= 1999 in Latin music =

This is a list of notable events in Latin music (i.e., music from the Spanish- and Portuguese-speaking areas Latin America, Latin Europe, and the United States) that took place in 1999.

== Events ==
- February 24 — The 41st Annual Grammy Awards are held at the Shrine Auditorium in Los Angeles.:
  - Ricky Martin's performance of "The Cup of Life" at the awards, was said to be a "game-changer for Latin music worldwide" according to Billboard's Leila Cobo and kick-started the Latin Pop Explosion. He also won Best Latin Pop Performance for Vuelve.
  - Contra la Corriente by Marc Anthony wins the award for Best Tropical Latin Performance.
  - Los Super Seven's self-titled album wins the award for Best Mexican-American Music Performance
  - Sueños Líquidos by Maná wins the award for Best Latin Rock/Alternative Performance.
  - Said and Done by Flaco Jiménez wins the award for Best Tejano Music Performance.
  - Hot House by Arturo Sandoval wins the award for Best Latin Jazz Performance.
- May 6 — The 11th Annual Lo Nuestro Awards are held at the James L. Knight Center in Miami, Florida. Puerto Rican American singer Elvis Crespo is the most awarded artist with five wins.
- April 20 to April 22 — Billboard holds its 10th Annual Latin Music Conference at the Fontainebleau Hotel in Miami, Florida.
  - In the same week, Billboard holds its 6th Annual Latin Music Awards on April 22. Puerto Rican American singer Elvis Crespo is the most awarded artist with four wins. Spanish singer Rocío Dúrcal is inducted into the Billboard Latin Music Hall of Fame.
- November 20 — The Latin Academy of Recording Arts & Sciences announces that the inaugural Latin Grammy Awards would held in 2001. The new music awards would encompass music Latin America, Spain, Portugal, and the United States. It would later be pushed forward to September 2000.
- December 26 — The Recording Industry Association of America (RIAA) reports a 12% growth on the Latin music market in the United States compared to 1998. This gives Latin music a 4.9% share of the total music market. The report does not include sales of albums done by English-speaking Latino artists as the RIAA only considers an album to be "Latin" if 51% or more of its content is recorded in Spanish.

== Number-ones albums and singles by country ==
- List of number-one albums of 1999 (Spain)
- List of number-one singles of 1999 (Spain)
- List of number-one Billboard Top Latin Albums of 1999
- List of number-one Billboard Hot Latin Tracks of 1999

== Awards ==
- 1999 Premio Lo Nuestro
- 1999 Billboard Latin Music Awards
- 1999 Tejano Music Awards

== Albums released ==
=== First quarter ===
==== January ====
Day	Title	Artist	Genre(s)	Singles	Label
4	Nuestro Amor	Los Tri-O			BMG U.S. Latin, Ariola
12	Vengo Naciendo	Pablo Milanés	Nueva Trova		Universal Music
12	Só no Forevis	Raimundos	Alternative Rock, Harcore, Punk		WEA Music
16	Tr3s. Jeans	Jeans			
26	Trozos de Mi Alma	Marco Antonio Solís	Ballad, Bolero		FonoVisa
26	Fundamental	Puya	Jazz-Rock, Progressive Metal, Salsa, Latin Jazz, Fusion, Nu Metal		MCA Records, Surco
26	Imagínate	Charlie Cruz	Salsa		Sir George Records

==== February ====
Day	Title	Artist	Genre(s)	Singles	Label
2	Con ustedes	Eddie Gonzalez	Tejano		Sony
9	Por el Amor de Siempre	Pepe Aguilar	Ranchera, Mariachi		Musart
9	Amar Es Un Juego	Millie			EMI Latin
9	Dónde Estás Corazón	Pablo Montero	Mariachi, Ballad		BMG U.S. Latin, RCA
9	Sinceridad	Rabito	Ballad, Religious		FonoVisa
16	Noelia	Noelia			Fonovisa
16	Alegrías y Penas	Tito Rojas	Salsa	"Te Quiero Para Mi" "Por Mujeres Como Tu"	Musical Productions
16	Arráncame a Puños	Yesenia Flores	Mariachi		FonoVisa
16	El Rey del Jaripeo	Joan Sebastian			
16	Lullabies of Latin America: canciones de cuna de Latinoamérica	Maria del Rey			Music For Little People
16	Muchacho Solitario	Servando & Florentino	Soundtrack, Salsa, Ballad	"Muchacho Solitario" "Mal de Amor" "Te Regalo la Luna"	Wea Latina, Inc.
23	A Todas las Que Amé	Ezequiel Peña	Ranchera		FonoVisa
23	Un Poco Más	Menudo	Europop, Ballad		Sony Latin
23	Volando en una Nave Triste	Los Acosta	Conjunto	"En Algún Lugar" "Amor Imposible"	EMI Latin
23	Para Toda La Vida	Rocío Dúrcal	Bolero, Ballad		Ariola
23	Gran Homenaje: Recuerdos Del Amor...	Industria del Amor	Cumbia		FonoVisa

==== March ====
Day	Title	Artist	Genre(s)	Singles	Label
9	Tumbao Para los Congueros de Mi Vida	Al McKibbon			
9	10 Aniversario	Emilio Navaira	Tejano		EMI Latin
9	Contrabando en los Huevos	Grupo Exterminador	Corrido, Norteno		Fonovisa
16	Desamor	Luis Vargas	Bachata		J&N Records
23	Amor, Familia y Respeto	A.B. Quintanilla y Los Kumbia Kings	Cumbia	"Reggae Kumbia" "Azúcar" "Se Fue Mi Amor" "Fuiste Mata" "U Don't Love Me"	EMI Latin
23	Corazón	Ednita Nazario	Vocal		EMI Latin
23	El Cazador	Bobby Pulido	Tejano	"Cantarle a Ella" "Mi Corazon y Mi Mente"	EMI Latin
23	En Vivo Desde el Carnegie Hall	Danny Rivera			BMG U.S. Latin
30	Romanticos y... Con Sombrero	Javier Torres Y Su Grupo			
30	¡Y No Hay Problema!	Los Toros Band	Merengue, Salsa		Universal Music Latino

=== Second quarter ===
==== April ====
Day	Title	Artist	Genre(s)	Singles	Label
6	Naci Con Suerte De Rey	Los Originales De San Juan		"Nací con Suerte de Rey" "El Gato de Oaxaco"	
8	Os amores libres	Carlos Núñez Muñoz	Celtic, Flamenco, Sephardic	"Jigs & Bulls" "Muiñeiras da Sorte" "A Orillas del Rio Sil"	RCA Victor, BMG Classics
13	Inolvidable, Vol. 2: Enamorado de Ti	José Luis Rodríguez			
13	Para el Bailador	La Makina	Merengue		J&N Records, Sony Discos
13	Suena Flamenco	Miguel Poveda	Flamenco		Harmonia Mundi France
20	Clase Aparte	Tito Nieves	Salsa	"Le Gusta Que la Vean" "Permiteme Darte un Beso"	RMM Records
20	Gotcha!	Dark Latin Groove	Latin, Bachata, Salsa	"Volveré" "Prisionero"	Sony Discos, Swing Factory, Sony Discos, Swing Factory
27	Mi Vida Sin Tu Amor	Cristian Castro	Ballad		BMG U.S. Latin
27	Caminando	Tony Tun Tun			
27	Soy como soy	Ana Gabriel	Vocal		Sony Discos
27	Nadie Como Yo	David Lee Garza & Los Musicales	Tejano		Sony Discos
27	A Forca Que Nunca Seca	Maria Bethânia	MPB, Samba		Ariola
27	Siento	Yolandita Monge	Latin, Ballad		BMG U.S. Latin
27	En Vivo Para Ti	Conjunto Primavera			

==== May ====
Day	Title	Artist	Genre(s)	Singles	Label
4	Píntame	Elvis Crespo	Salsa, Merengue		Sony Latin
11	Mi Verdad	Alejandro Fernández	Tejano, Mariachi		Sony Discos
18	Innamorarae: Summer Flamenco	Ottmar Liebert			
18	De Vida o Muerte	Los Invasores de Nuevo León			EMI
18	Songs From a Little Blue House	Juan Carlos Formell	Cubano		Wicklow
18	Resurrection	Chris Pérez Band			Hollywood Records
18	Ellas cantan a cri cri	Various artists			
25	Siempre Contigo	Jay Perez	Tejano		Sony Discos
31	Tempo	Leonardo	Country		RCA

==== June ====
Day	Title	Artist	Genre(s)	Singles	Label
8	Buena Vista Social Club Presents Ibrahim Ferrer	Ibrahim Ferrer	Son, Afro-Cuban, Bolero, Guaguanco, Cubano, Son Montuno, Guajira	"Mami Me Gustó" "Aquellos Ojos Verdes"	World Circuit, Nonesuch
8	Briyumba Palo Congo – Religion of the Congo	Chucho Valdés	Afro-Cuban Jazz, Latin Jazz		Blue Note
8	Herido	José Alberto "El Canario"	Salsa		Ryko Latino
15	Néctar	Enanitos Verdes	Pop rock		Universal Music Latino
15	Entrega	George Lamond	Salsa	"Que Te Vas" "Solo Palabras"	Sony Discos
22	MTV Unplugged	Maná	Pop rock		Wea Latina, Inc.
28	Bocanada	Gustavo Cerati	Alternative Rock, Downtempo	"Engaña" "Bocanada" "Puente" "Río Babel" "Paseo Inmoral"	Ariola, BMG U.S. Latin
29	Herencia de Familia	Los Tigres del Norte	Corrido, Norteño		Fonovisa
29	Te Quiero, Te Amo, Te Extraño	Banda Los Largos			
29	Sublime Ilusión	Eliades Ochoa	Bolero, Tango, Son		Higher Octave World
29	Lleno de Vida	Manny Manuel	Salsa, Pachanga, Merengue		Merengazo Records
29	Mil Gracias	Banda Maguey	Cumbia, Ranchera		RCA, BMG Entertainment Mexico, S.A. De C.V.
29	Un Pedazo de Luna	Guardianes del Amor	Ballad		BMG U.S. Latin
30	Amor Platónico	Los Tucanes de Tijuana	Cumbia, Merengue, Ranchera, Ballad, Bolero	"Espejeando" "La Traigo Muerta"	EMI Latin

=== Third quarter ===
==== July ====
Day	Title	Artist	Genre(s)	Singles	Label
6	Nada Es Igual	Franco De Vita	Ballad, Bachata, Reggae		Sony Discos
8	Expresión	Gilberto Santa Rosa	Salsa, Ballad		Sony Discos
13	Tiempos	Rubén Blades	Salsa		Sony Discos, Sony Discos
13	Tierra de Nadie	Hevia	Folk Rock		EMI
19	La Magia del Amor	Los Ángeles de Charly	Ballad		FonoVisa
20	Revés/Yo Soy	Café Tacuba	Alternative Rock		Warner Bros. Records
20	Zezé di Camargo & Luciano (1999)	Zezé di Camargo & Luciano	Sertanejo		Columbia
27	Juegos de Amor	Só Pra Contrariar	Ballad, Samba		BMG U.S. Latin, RCA
27	Que Lo Que Ta Pasando	9-11			

==== August ====
Day	Title	Artist	Genre(s)	Singles	Label
3	Rancheros de oro	Banda Machos			
3	Por Eso Te Amo	Los Palominos	Tejano		Sony Discos
10	Si Estuvieras Conmigo	Liberación	Ballad, Cumbia, Ranchera		Disa, Disa
10	Back to the Future	Willie Rosario	Salsa		HMS Records, Sony Discos
17	The Heart of a Legend	Chico O'Farrill	Afro-Cuban Jazz	"Momentumi" "Sing Your Blues Away (For Neca)" "Te Quiero Dijiste" "Manteca"	Milestone
23	Al Por Mayor	Los Tucanes de Tijuana	Ballad, Bolero, Charanga, Corrido, Cumbia, Norteno, Ranchera		EMI Latin, Cadena Musical
23	Séptima Harmonía	Limi-T 21			
24	La Marcha del Golazo Solitario	Los Fabulosos Cadillacs	Ska		BMG U.S. Latin, Ariola
24	La Formula Original	Oscar D'León	Salsa		RMM Records
24	Inner Voyage	Gonzalo Rubalcaba	Contemporary Jazz, Latin Jazz	"Here's That Rainy Day" "Caravan"	Blue Note
24	Leche	Illya Kuryaki and the Valderramas	Alternative Rock, Salsa, Electro, Pop Rap	"Latin Geisha" "Coolo" "Jennifer del Estero"	Universal, Interdisc
24	La Reina del Pueblo con Banda	Graciela Beltrán	Banda		EMI Latin
27	Contigo	Intocable	Tejano	"El Amigo Que Se Fue" "Fuerte No Say" "Sonador Eterno" "Ya Estoy Cansado"	EMI Latin
30	Llegar A Ti	Jaci Velasquez	Vocal, Ballad		Sony Discos, Sony Discos
31	Con la London Metropolitan Orchestra	Ricardo Montaner	Ranchera		WEA
31	Llegó...Los Van Van	Los Van Van			
31	Corazón de Cristal	Priscila y sus Balas de Plata	Tejano, Cumbia		FonoVisa
31	Ivete Sangalo	Ivete Sangalo	Axe, MPB	"Canibal" "100 O Seu Amor" "Eternamente" "Sá Marina"	Universal Music, Mercury

==== September ====
Day	Title	Artist	Genre(s)	Singles	Label
7	Momentos	La Mafia	Tejano, Conjunto	"Momentos" "Mi Amor Sin" "Soy Tan Felíz"	Sony Discos
7	Si Me Conocieras	Nydia Rojas	Mariachi		Hollywood Records
7	Quinteto Real Nuevo	Quinteto Real Nuevo	Tango		Forever Music, Forever Music
7	Tangos de terciopelo	Quinteto Argentino de Cuerdas			
13	Amarte Es un Placer	Luis Miguel	Bachata, Ballad		WEA
14	Apocalypshit	Molotov	Alternative Rock, Funk Metal, Hardcore		Universal, Surco
14	Latin Jazz Suite	Lalo Schifrin	Big Band, Latin Jazz	"Montuño" "Fiesta"	Aleph Records
14	Rompiendo el Milenio	Los Sabrosos del Merengue	Merengue		Caiman Records
14	Algo Natural	Alejandra Guzmán	Pop rock		BMG U.S. Latin
21	Todo lo Que Soy	Carlos Ponce		"Escuchame"	EMI Latin
21	El Amor de Mi Tierra	Carlos Vives	Cumbia, Rumba		EMI Latin
21	Mambo Birdland	Tito Puente	Salsa, Mambo, Cha-Cha, Guaguanco		RMM Records & Videos Corp., RMM Records
21	Sola	La India	Salsa	"Hielo" "Sola"	RMM Records
21	Quien Mato A Hector Lavoe?	Domingo Quiñones	Salsa		RMM Records
27	Na Pressão	Lenine	MPB		BMG Brasil
28	Inconfundible	Víctor Manuelle	Salsa, Vocal, Bolero	"Si la Ves" "Pero Dile" "Como Quisiera Decirte" "Como Duele"	Sony Discos, Sony Discos
28	Los Más Grandes Exitos de Los Dandy's	Vicente Fernández	Ranchera		Sony Discos, Sony Discos
28	En Vivo-En Concierto	Grupo Límite			Universal, Rodven
28	Consentida	Antonio Aguilar	Ranchera, Bolero		Musart Especial
28	La Leyenda Continua...	Cornelio Reyna Jr. featuring Ramón Ayala y Sus Bravos Del Norte			
28	Tropicana Nights	Paquito D'Rivera	Latin Jazz, Mambo, Danzon, Bolero	"Tropicana Nights" "A Mi Que / El Manisero (The Peanut Vendor)"	Chesky Records
28	Vo Imbola	Zeca Baleiro	MPB	"Semba" "Tem Que Ancontecer" "Samba Do Approach"	MZA Music, Universal
29	Bien de arriba	Nestor Marconi	Tango		WEA
29	Claridade	Alcione	Samba		Globo Universal

=== Fourth quarter ===
==== October ====
Day	Title	Artist	Genre(s)	Singles	Label
5	100 Años de Mariachi	Plácido Domingo	Mariachi		EMI Latin
5	Lado B Lado A	O Rappa			WEA Music
12	Asomate a Mi Alma	Los Tiranos del Norte			
13	Todo Está Bien	Juan Gabriel	Ballad, Latin Pop		Ariola
13	Sérgio Reis e Convidados	Sérgio Reis			
14	Decimo Aniversario	Los Terribles del Norte			
14	Otra Vez a la Cantina	Michael Salgado	Tejano		Discos Joey
19	Por Una Mujer Bonita	Pepe Aguilar			Musart
26	Vivo	Ricardo Arjona	Ballad		Sony Discos
26	Mi Gloria Eres Tu	Los Tri-O			BMG
26	La Magia de Cuco	Toño Rosario	Merengue		Wea Latina, Inc.
26	Profundamente	El Coyote y Su Banda Tierra Santa	Ranchera, Norteno		EMI Latin
26	Latin Soul	Poncho Sanchez	Latin Jazz		Concord Picante
26	Distinto Diferente	Afro-Cuban All Stars	Afro-Cuban, Bolero, Danzon, Norteno	"Tumba Palo Cocuyé" "Huellas del Pasado"	World Circuit, Nonesuch
26	Regalo de Amor y Paz	Danny Rivera			
26	Lo Que Llevo Por Dentro	Frankie Negrón	Salsa		WeaCaribe
27	Acústico MTV	Legião Urbana	Pop rock, Alternative Rock, Post-Punk, Folk Rock, Acoustic		EMI
29	Ana Carolina	Ana Carolina	MPB		Ariola, BMG Brasil Ltda.

==== November ====
Day	Title	Artist	Genre(s)	Singles	Label
2	Mexicano Hasta la Madre	Los Originales de San Juan			
2	Bomba 2000	Los Hermanos Rosario	Merengue		Karen Records
2	Calle Salud	Compay Segundo	Afro-Cuban, Bolero, Cha-Cha, Merengue, Son	"Saludo a Changó" "Viejos Sones de Santiago Potpourri"	Nonesuch
9	Esperando un Angel	Banda Arkángel R-15			
9	Los Hermanos	Los Hermanos	Alternative Rock, Hardcore, Pop rock		Abril Music
9	Generation Next	Aventura	Bachata		Premium Latin Music
9	Christmas	Raúl di Blasio	Easy Listening, Christmas		BMG U.S. Latin
15	La Dolores	Plácido Domingo	Zarzuela, Opera		Decca
16	Olga Viva, Viva Olga	Olga Tañón	Bachata, Merengue, Boogaloo	"Es Mentiroso" "Me Subes, Me Bajas, Me Subes"	WEA Latina
16	Acústico MTV	Os Paralamas do Sucesso	Acoustic, Pop rock		EMI, EMI, MTV Music Television, MTV Music Television
16	Un Sonido Bestial	Richie Ray & Bobby Cruz	Salsa, Bolero	"Agúzate" "Sonido Bestial" "A Mi Manera" "Richie's Jala Jala"	Universal Music Latino
22	Pacantó	Totó la Momposina	Cumbia, Porro, Champeta	"Acompáñala" "Chambacú" "La Paloma"	Nuevos Medios
23	Masters of the Stage	Grupo Manía	Merengue		Sony Discos
23	El Padrino	Fulanito	Cumbia, Merengue		Cutting Records
23	Crooner	Milton Nascimento	MPB	"Mas Que Nada"	Warner Bros. Records
30	Cumbias Sin Control	Grupo Control			
30	Tres	Fiel a la Vega			EMI Latin
30	Una Lluvia de Flores	Los Ángeles Azules			
Unknown	Titãs & Paralamas Juntos Ao Vivo	Titãs, Os Paralamas do Sucesso			Not On Label

==== December ====
Day	Title	Artist	Genre(s)	Singles	Label
2	Nocheros	Los Nocheros	Ballad, Folk, Vocal		EMI, EMI
7	Los grandes éxitos en español	Cypress Hill	Gangsta		Ruffhouse Records
7	Navidad con Tito Rojas	Tito Rojas	Salsa		Musical Productions, Sony Discos
14	Celebracion: Epic Duets	Eddie Santiago	Salsa, Sonero		Sony Discos
28	De la zambra al duende... un homenaje	Juan Habichuela	Flamenco		Mercury

=== Unknown ===
Title	Artist	Genre(s)	Singles	Label
Alma	Conjunto Alma Norteña			
Jaime y los Chamascos	Jaime y los Chamascos			
Latin Jazz Explosion	Bobby Rodríguez			
Norteño 2000	Los Huracanes del Norte			
Tu Decisión	Ana Bárbara		"Engañada"	FonoVisa
Misa Criolla	Mercedes Sosa	Religious, Folk, Christmas		Mercury
Postales del Alma	Lito Vitale and Juan Carlos Baglietto			
Eterno Buenos Aires	Rodolfo Mederos	Tango		WEA
Paris 1987	Camarón de la Isla and Tomatito	Flamenco		Mercury
Com Vocé... Meu Mundo Ficaria Completo	Cássia Eller	Pop rock, MPB	"O Segundo Sol" "Um Branco, Um Xis, Um Zero" "Pedra Gigante"	Universal Music, Mercury
Zeca Pagodinho ao Vivo	Zeca Pagodinho	Samba		Mercury, Universal Music
Tudo Azul	Velha Guarda da Portela	Samba		Lusafrica
Voce Vai Ver o Que é Bom	Dominguinhos	Forró		Velas
Carlos Malta e Pife Muderno	Carlos Malta e Pife Muderno	Forró, Batucada		Rob Digital
Primavera	Eliana			BMG Brasil, RCA
João Gilberto Voz e Violão	João Gilberto	Bossa Nova	"Desde Que O Samba Samba" "Coração Vagabundo"	Verve Records
EYA 1998	Elida Y Avante	Tejano		Tejas Records
Hoja en Blanco	Monchy & Alexandra	Bachata		JVN Musical Inc.
In Your Face	Dream Team			
Reflexiones	Grupo Mojado			
As Dez Mais	Titãs	Pop rock		WEA Music
A Lo Cubano	Orishas	Contemporary R&B, Pop Rap, Conscious	"A lo Cubano" "537 C.U.B.A."	Chrysalis
Wild Teen-Punk From Peru 1965	Los Saicos	Garage Rock		Electro Harmonix
2000 Cuarteto Caracteristico	Rodrigo			Magenta, Magenta
Aerolineas Makiza	Makiza	Conscious		Columbia
Hombre Sintetizador	Zurdok	Alternative Rock	"Hombre Sintetizador I" "Si Quieres Llegar Muy Lejos"	Mercury, Universal, Discos Manicomio
Sal y Mileto	Sal y Mileto			Not On Label

== Best-selling records ==
=== Best-selling albums ===
The following is a list of the top 10 best-selling Latin albums in the United States in 1999, according to Billboard.

Rank	Album	Artist
1	Vuelve	Ricky Martin
2	Suavemente	Elvis Crespo
3	All My Hits/Todos Mis Exitos Vol. 1	Selena
4	Bailamos	Enrique Iglesias
5	Dónde Están los Ladrones?	Shakira
6	Buena Vista Social Club	Buena Vista Social Club
7	Cosas del Amor	Enrique Iglesias
8	Píntame	Elvis Crespo
9	MTV Unplugged	Maná
10	Buena Vista Social Club Presents Ibrahim Ferrer	Ibrahim Ferrer

=== Best-performing songs ===
The following is a list of the top 10 best-performing Latin songs in the United States in 1999, according to Billboard.

Rank	Single	Artist
1	"Necesito Decirte"	Conjunto Primavera
2	"Loco"	Alejandro Fernández
3	"No Me Ames"	Jennifer Lopez and Marc Anthony
4	"Me Voy a Quitar de En Medio"	Vicente Fernández
5	"Livin' la Vida Loca"	Ricky Martin
6	"Si Te Pudiera Mentir"	Marco Antonio Solís
7	"Bailamos"	Enrique Iglesias
8	"Dejaría Todo"	Chayanne
9	"Me Estoy Acostumbrando a Tí"	Pepe Aguilar
10	"Creí"	Los Tiranos del Norte

== Births ==
- January 5 – Miguelito, Puerto Rican reggaeton singer
- January 11 – Christian Nodal, Mexican ranchera singer
- June 27 – Aitana, Spanish pop singer
- August 7 – Mariah Angeliq, American reggaeton singer
- August 13 – Giulia Be, Brazilian pop singer

== Deaths ==
- January 14 – Sabina Olmos, 85, Argentine tango singer and actress
- February 17 – Tania, 105, Spanish-Argentine tango singer and actress
- March 19 – Juanita Reina, 73, Spanish actress and singer of copla music
- September 14 – Eddy Gaytán, 70, Argentine-Cuban musician
- October 6 – Amália Rodrigues, 79, Portuguese singer known worldwide as the "Queen of Fado".
