= Premio Lo Nuestro 2000 =

Latin Music awards show

12th Lo Nuestro Awards
- Date: Friday, May 5, 2000
- Site: James L. Knight Center; Miami, Florida, USA
- Hosted by: Julio Sabala

Highlights
- Most awards: Pepe Aguilar, Elvis Crespo and Ricky Martin (3)
- Most nominations: Marc Anthony (5)

The 12th Lo Nuestro Awards ceremony, presented by Univision to honor the best Latin music of 1999 and 2000, took place on May 5, 2000, at a live presentation held at the James L. Knight Center in Miami, Florida. The ceremony was broadcast in the United States and Latin America by Univision.

During the ceremony, nineteen categories were presented. Winners were announced at the live event and included Mexican singer-songwriter Pepe Aguilar and Puerto-Rican American singers Elvis Crespo and Ricky Martin receiving three competitive awards each. Aguilar earned the award for Regional Mexican Album of the Year, Crespo won for Tropical/Salsa Album of the Year, and the Pop Album of the Year was presented to American band Santana. A special tribute was given to Mexican singer Cristian Castro and the Excellence Award was received by Mexican performer Antonio Aguilar.

== Background ==
In 1989, the Lo Nuestro Awards were established by Univision, to recognize the most talented performers of Latin music. The nominees and winners were selected by a voting poll conducted among program directors of Spanish-language radio stations in the United States and the results were tabulated and certified by the accounting firm Arthur Andersen. The categories included are for the Pop, Tropical/Salsa, Regional Mexican and Music Video. The trophy awarded is shaped like a treble clef. The 12th Lo Nuestro Awards ceremony was held on May 5, 2000, in a live presentation held at the James L. Knight Center in Miami, Florida. The ceremony was broadcast in the United States and Latin America by Univision.

== Winners and nominees ==
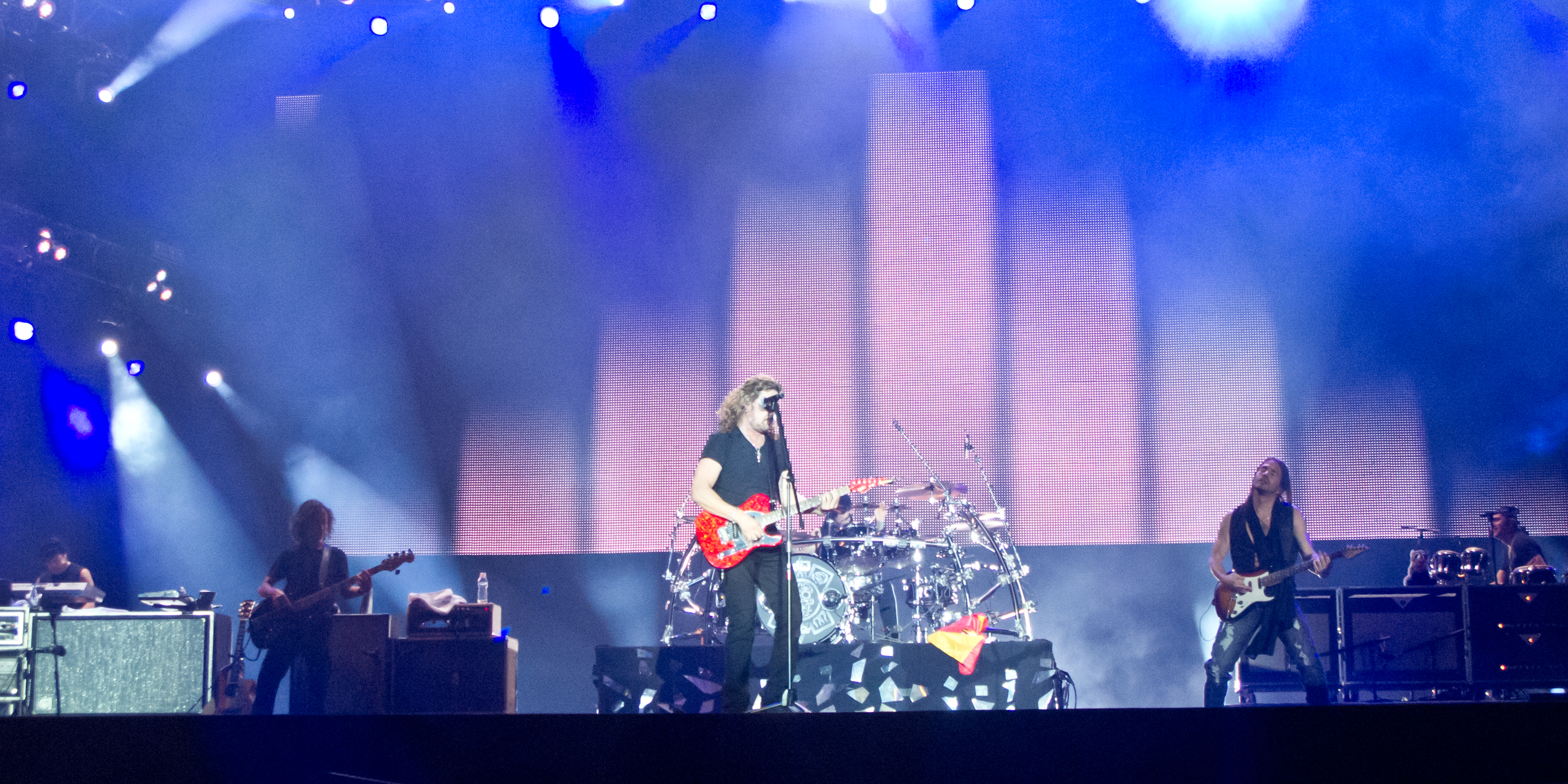
Maná (pictured in 2012) won the Lo Nuestro Award for Pop Group of the Year.

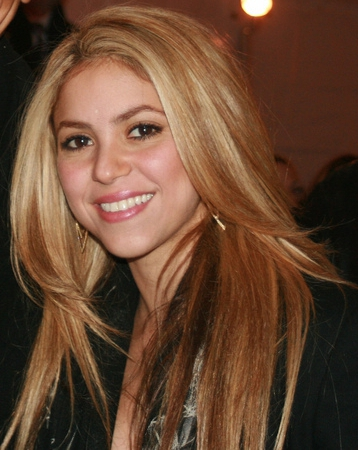
Colombian singer Shakira (pictured in 2009) was named Female Pop Singer of the Year for the third time.

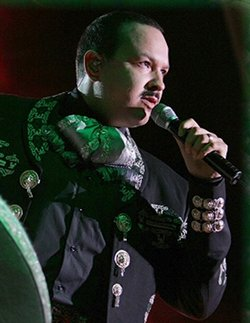
Singer-songwriter Pepe Aguilar received the Regional/Mexican Album of the Year Award.

Winners were announced before the live audience during the ceremony. American singer Marc Anthony was the most nominated performer, but ended the ceremony winning none. Anthony's nominations at the Tropical/Salsa Field (Male Singer and Song of the Year) were awarded to Puerto-Rican American Elvis Crespo, who also received the Album of the Year accolade for his second album Píntame; while his Pop Field nominations were handed to "Livin' la Vida Loca" by Ricky Martin for Song of the Year and Male Artist was also given to Martin. The English-language version of "Livin' la Vida Loca" was also nominated for a Grammy Award for Song of the Year at the 42nd Grammy Awards.

American band Santana received the Pop Album of the Year Award, three months after winning the Grammy Award for Album of the Year. Colombian singer Shakira was named Pop Female Artist for the third time. The Regional/Mexican field was dominated for second year in a row by Mexican singer Pepe Aguilar who won Male Artist and Album of the Year; his father, performer Antonio Aguilar, received the Excellence Award at the ceremony.

Winners and nominees of the 12th Annual Lo Nuestro Awards (winners listed first)^{[I]}
Pop Album of the Year	Pop Song of the Year
Santana – Supernatural; Cristian Castro – Mi Vida Sin Tu Amor; Enrique Iglesias – Bailamos; Luis Miguel – Amarte Es Un Placer; Ricky Martin – Ricky Martin	Ricky Martin – "Livin' la Vida Loca"; Marc Anthony – "Dímelo"; Ricardo Arjona – "Desnuda"; Enrique Iglesias – "Bailamos"; Noelia – "Tú"
Pop Male Artist	Pop Female Artist
Ricky Martin; Chayanne; Cristian Castro; Marc Anthony	Shakira; Jennifer Lopez; Noelia; Jaci Velasquez
Pop Duo or Group of the Year	New Pop Artist of the Year
Maná; Jennifer Lopez and Marc Anthony; Los Trí-O; El Símbolo	Jaci Velasquez; El Símbolo; Jennifer Lopez; Noelia
Regional Mexican Album of the Year	Regional Mexican Song of the Year
Pepe Aguilar – Por Una Mujer Bonita; Intocable – Contigo; Ezequiel Peña – A Todas Las Que Amé; Priscila y sus Balas de Plata – 12 Balazos de Plata; Marco Antonio Solís – Trozos de Mi Alma; Los Tigres del Norte – Herencia de Familia; Los Tucanes de Tijuana – Al Por Mayor	Conjunto Primavera – "Necesito Decirte"; Los Angeles Azules – "El Listón de Tu Pelo"; Pepe Aguilar – "Perdóname"; Pepe Aguilar – "Me Estoy Acostumbrando a Ti"; Los Tucanes de Tijuana – "Amor Platónico"
Male Artist of the Year, Regional Mexican	Female Artist of the Year, Regional Mexican
Pepe Aguilar; Alejandro Fernández; Vicente Fernández; Juan Gabriel	Ana Gabriel; Ana Bárbara; Graciela Beltrán; Yesenia Flores; Paquita la del Barrio
Regional Mexican Group of the Year	Regional Mexican New Artist of the Year
Conjunto Primavera; A.B. Quintanilla and Kumbia Kings; Banda el Recodo; Los Angeles Azules	A.B. Quintanilla and Kumbia Kings; Corvo; Grupo Tentación; Los Askis; Paco Barrón y su Norteños Clan; Los Sementales de Nuevo León.
Tropical/Salsa Album of the Year	Tropical/Salsa Song of the Year
Elvis Crespo – Píntame; Grupo Manía – Masters of the Stage; George Lamond – Entrega; Gilberto Santa Rosa – Expresión; Víctor Manuelle – Inconfundible; Carlos Vives – El Amor de Mi Tierra	Elvis Crespo – "Píntame"; Marc Anthony – "No Sabes Como Duele"; Grupo Manía – "Bajo la Lluvia"; Juan Luis Guerra – "El Niágara en Bicicleta"; Tito Rojas – "Por Mujeres Como Tú"
Male Artist of the Year, Tropical/Salsa	Female Artist of the Year, Tropical/Salsa
Elvis Crespo; Marc Anthony; Víctor Manuelle; Gilberto Santa Rosa	Olga Tañón; Gisselle; La India; Milly Quezada
Tropical/Salsa Duo or Group of the Year	New Tropical/Salsa Artist of the Year
Grupo Manía; DLG; Fulanito; Los Hermanos Rosario	Son by Four; Grupo Mateo's; Lazz; Limi-T 21
Video of the Year
Ricky Martin – "Bella"

=== Notes ===
^{^[I]} This list is incomplete since there are not enough references to fill the nominees for all categories, only the winners are available and some nominees on a few categories.

== Special awards ==
- Lo Nuestro Excellence Award: Antonio Aguilar
- Special Tribute: Cristian Castro

== See also ==
- 1999 in Latin music
- 2000 in Latin music
- Latin Grammy Awards of 2000
- Grammy Award for Best Latin Pop Album
- Grammy Award for Best Merengue Album
- Grammy Award for Best Traditional Tropical Latin Album
