= List of Billboard Tropical Airplay number ones of 1999 =

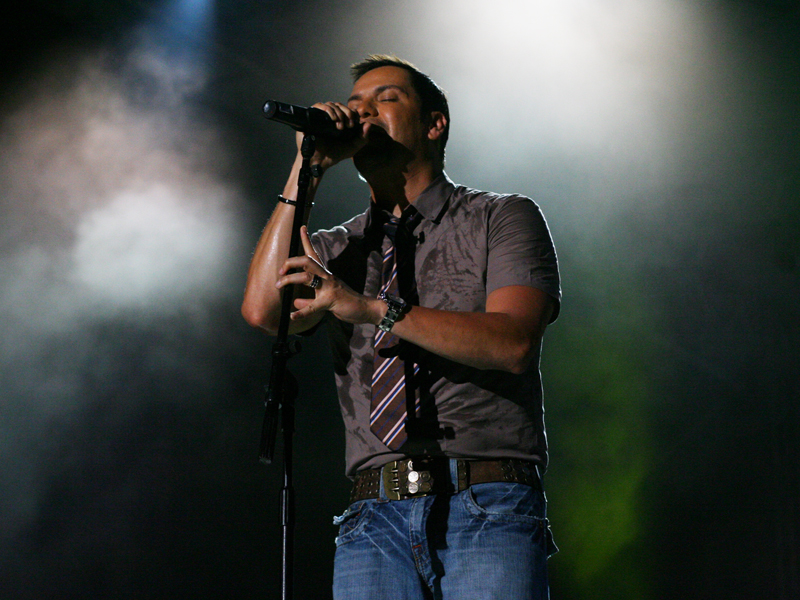
Víctor Manuelle had the longest-running number one song of 1999 with "Pero Dile". He also had the final number one of 1999.

Tropical Airplay is a chart published by Billboard magazine that ranks the top-performing songs (regardless of genre or language) on tropical radio stations in the United States, based on weekly airplay data compiled by Nielsen's Broadcast Data Systems. It is a subchart of Hot Latin Songs, which lists the best-performing Spanish-language songs in the country. In 1999, 11 songs topped the chart, in 52 issues of the magazine.

The first number one of the year was "El Cuerpo Me Pide" by Víctor Manuelle and Elvis Crespo from the Christmas compilation album Tarjeta de Navidad, Vol. 2 (1998). The song moved into the top spot in the issue dated January 9. It remained in the top spot for a week before being replaced by "Mi PC" by Juan Luis Guerra. Before its two-week stint at number one, "Mi PC" had previously topped the chart in the week ending December 12, 1998, spending a total of five weeks at number one. Víctor Manuelle also had the final number one of 1999 with "Pero Dile", which was the longest-running number one of the year with nine weeks. Guerra achieved his second number one of the year with "Palomita Blanca". Jerry Rivera's "Ese" superseded "Mi PC", dominating the top spot for eight consecutive weeks and earning the distinction of being his fifth overall number one on the chart. "Ese" and "Déjate Querer" by Gilberto Santa Rosa had the longest continuous run at number one in 1999.

Tito Rojas obtained his second and final chart-topper with his cover version of Pepe Aguilar's song "Por Mujeres Como Tú". Jennifer Lopez achieved her first number one on the Tropical Airplay chart with "No Me Ames", performed in collaboration with Marc Anthony, and was the sole female artist to attain the summit during the year. The salsa version of "No Me Ames", titled as the "tropical remix", was commercially released to tropical radio stations by Sony Discos. Marc Anthony achieved his 12th number one later in the year with "Dímelo", the Spanish-language version of "I Need to Know".

== Chart history ==
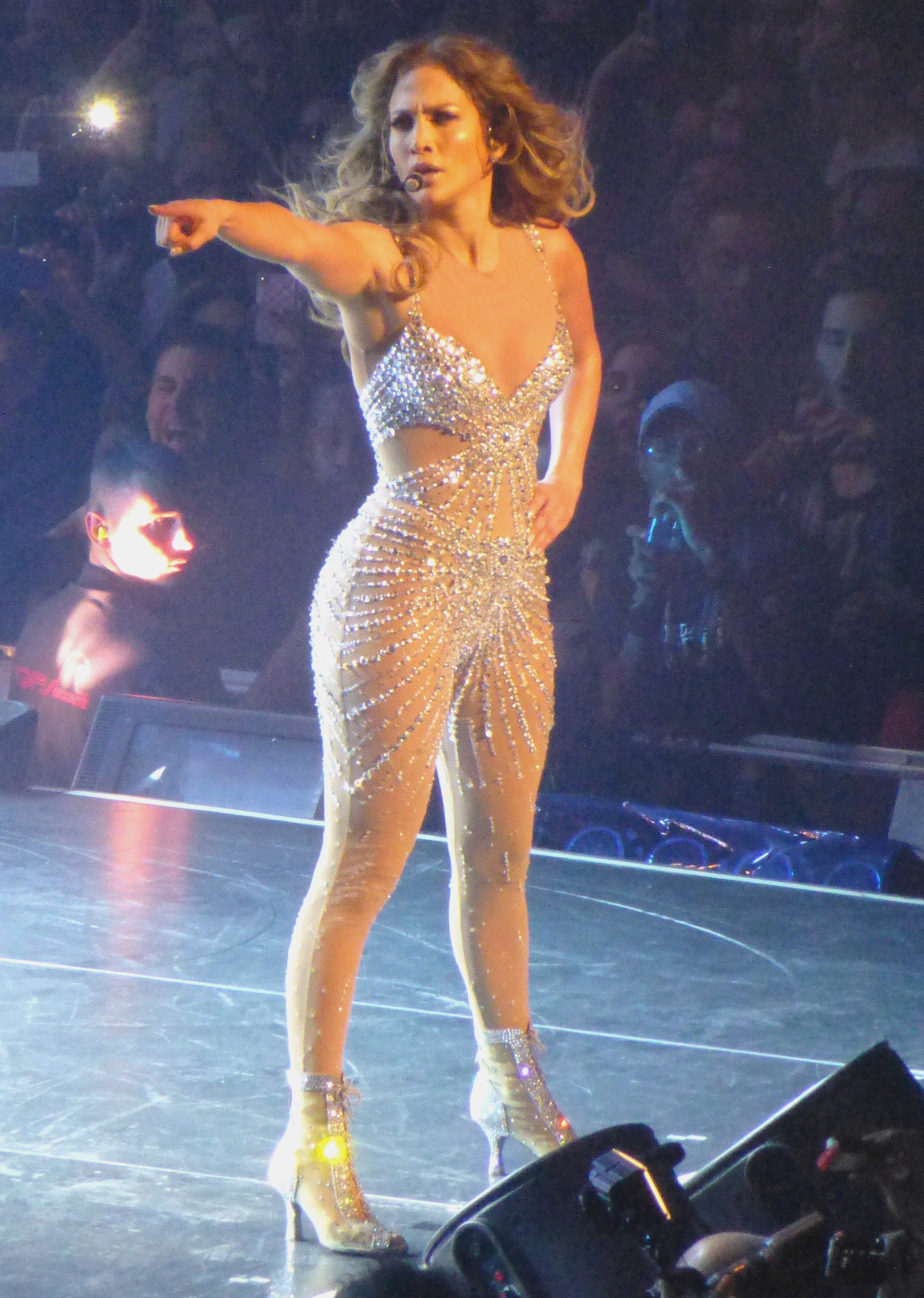
Jennifer Lopez achieved her first chart-topper with "No Me Ames" and was the only female artist to top the chart in 1999

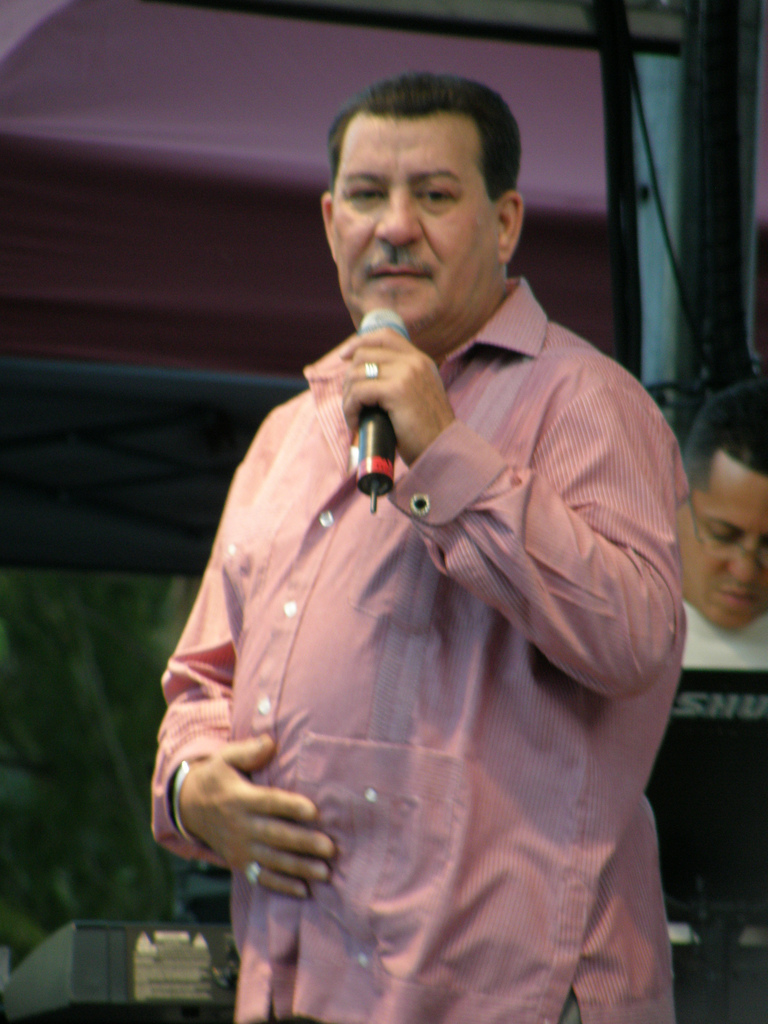
Tito Rojas had his final number one with his cover of "Por Mujeres Como Tú".

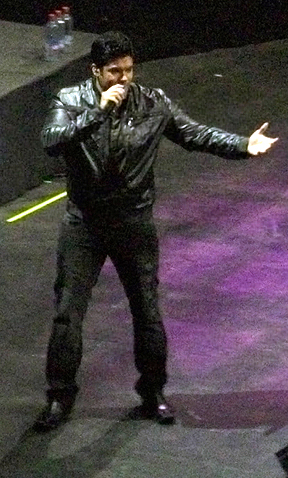
"Ese" by Jerry Rivera (pictured) tied with "Déjate Querer" by Gilberto Santa Rosa as the longest uninterrupted run, eight weeks, at the top of the Tropical Airplay chart

Chart history
Issue date	Title	Artist(s)	Ref.
January 2	"Mi PC"	Juan Luis Guerra	
January 9	"El Cuerpo Me Pide"	Víctor Manuelle and Elvis Crespo	
January 16	"Mi PC"	Juan Luis Guerra	
January 23	"Mi PC"	Juan Luis Guerra	
January 30	"Ese"	Jerry Rivera	
February 6	"Ese"	Jerry Rivera	
February 13	"Ese"	Jerry Rivera	
February 20	"Ese"	Jerry Rivera	
February 27	"Ese"	Jerry Rivera	
March 6	"Ese"	Jerry Rivera	
March 13	"Ese"	Jerry Rivera	
March 20	"Ese"	Jerry Rivera	
March 27	"Palomita Blanca"	Juan Luis Guerra	
April 3	"Palomita Blanca"	Juan Luis Guerra	
April 10	"Niña Bonita"	Grupo Manía	
April 17	"Por Mujeres Como Tú"	Tito Rojas	
April 24	"Por Mujeres Como Tú"	Tito Rojas	
May 1	"Por Mujeres Como Tú"	Tito Rojas	
May 8	"Píntame"	Elvis Crespo	
May 15	"Píntame"	Elvis Crespo	
May 22	"Píntame"	Elvis Crespo	
May 29	"Píntame"	Elvis Crespo	
June 5	"Píntame"	Elvis Crespo	
June 12	"Píntame"	Elvis Crespo	
June 19	"Píntame"	Elvis Crespo	
June 26	"No Me Ames" (Tropical remix)	Jennifer Lopez with Marc Anthony	
July 3	"No Me Ames" (Tropical remix)	Jennifer Lopez with Marc Anthony	
July 10	"No Me Ames" (Tropical remix)	Jennifer Lopez with Marc Anthony	
July 17	"No Me Ames" (Tropical remix)	Jennifer Lopez with Marc Anthony	
July 24	"No Me Ames" (Tropical remix)	Jennifer Lopez with Marc Anthony	
July 31	"No Me Ames" (Tropical remix)	Jennifer Lopez with Marc Anthony	
August 7	"No Me Ames" (Tropical remix)	Jennifer Lopez with Marc Anthony	
August 14	"Déjate Querer"	Gilberto Santa Rosa	
August 21	"Déjate Querer"	Gilberto Santa Rosa	
August 28	"Déjate Querer"	Gilberto Santa Rosa	
September 4	"Déjate Querer"	Gilberto Santa Rosa	
September 11	"Déjate Querer"	Gilberto Santa Rosa	
September 18	"Déjate Querer"	Gilberto Santa Rosa	
September 25	"Déjate Querer"	Gilberto Santa Rosa	
October 2	"Déjate Querer"	Gilberto Santa Rosa	
October 9	"Dímelo"	Marc Anthony	
October 16	"Pero Dile"	Víctor Manuelle	
October 23	"Pero Dile"	Víctor Manuelle	
October 30	"Dímelo"	Marc Anthony	
November 6	"Dímelo"	Marc Anthony	
November 13	"Pero Dile"	Víctor Manuelle	
November 20	"Pero Dile"	Víctor Manuelle	
November 27	"Pero Dile"	Víctor Manuelle	
December 4	"Pero Dile"	Víctor Manuelle	
December 11	"Pero Dile"	Víctor Manuelle	
December 18	"Pero Dile"	Víctor Manuelle	
December 25	"Pero Dile"	Víctor Manuelle	

== Note ==
The best-performing tropical song of 1999 was "El Niágara en Bicicleta" by Juan Luis Guerra, which peaked at number two on the Tropical Airplay chart.
