= Pero Dile =

Single by Víctor Manuelle

from the album Inconfundible
- Released: 1999
- Genre: Salsa
- Length: 4:55
- Label: Sony Discos
- Songwriter(s): Víctor Manuelle
- Producer(s): Sergio George

Víctor Manuelle singles chronology
"La Persona Equivocada (Bolero version)" (1999)	"Pero Dile" (1999)	"Si la Ves" (2000)

"Pero Dile" (transl. "But Tell Them") is a song written and performed by American singer Víctor Manuelle on his sixth studio album, Inconfundible (1999). The song's production was handled by Sergio George, while the arrangement was done by Ramón Sanchez. It was released as the album's lead single in 1999 by Sony Discos. One of the album's salsa songs, it narrate the singer telling his ex to tell other people that he was a bad lover and admits to being at fault.

The song received with positive reactions by music critics for its catchy lyrics. "Pero Dile" was nominated in the category of Tropical/Salsa Hot Latin Track of the Year at the 2000 Billboard Latin Music Awards and was a recipient of the American Society of Composers, Authors and Publishers (ASCAP) Latin Award in 2000. In the United States, the song reached number three on the Billboard Hot Latin Songs. It also topped the US Tropical Airplay chart, spending 11 weeks at number one.

== Background and composition ==
In 1999, Víctor Manuelle released his sixth studio album, Inconfundible. Like his previous albums, it is a record of salsa tunes. Ramón Sanchez handled the album's arrangements, while American musician Sergio George produced two of the album's tracks, including "Pero Dile". "Pero Dile" is the only song in the album that Manuelle wrote by himself. The song tells of a "love hangover", in which Manuelle tells his former lover to proceed to "tell everyone he" was a rotten lover and everything was his fault and admits that how much he loved her may have been a mistake.

== Reception ==
"Pero Dile" was released as the album's lead single in 1999 by Sony Discos. In spite of giving the album a mixed review, AllMusic's José A. Estévez Jr. cited it as one of the songs where Manuelle is a "forceful, "dynamic singer", despite asserting the salsa genre being "sound undistinguished and devoid of novelty" during the late 1990s. Parry Gettelman of the Orlando Sentinel praised the song, noticing it is as "graceful as it is catchy", and that "the lyrics are humorously bitter." On his book, Hispanic New York: A Sourcebook (2010), Claudio Iván Remeseira wrote that the song's "manic momentum makes the heart race".

At the 7th Annual Billboard Latin Music Awards, "Pero Dile" was nominated in the category of Tropical/Salsa Hot Track of the Year, but ultimately lost to "El Niágara en Bicicleta" by Juan Luis Guerra. In 2000, it was recognized as one of the best-performing songs of the year at the American Society of Composers, Authors and Publishers Awards under the salsa field and did so again the following year. Commercially, "Pero Dile" reached number three on the Billboard Hot Latin Songs and topped the Tropical Airplay chart in the United States, becoming Manuelle's eighth number-one on the latter chart. It spent 11 weeks on top of the chart and was the fourth best-performing tropical song of 2000 in the country.

== Charts ==
=== Weekly charts ===
Weekly chart positions for "Pero Dile"
Chart (1999)	Peak position
US Hot Latin Songs (Billboard)	3
US Tropical Airplay (Billboard)	1

=== Year-end charts ===
1999 year-end chart performance for "Pero Dile"
Chart (2000)	Position
US Hot Latin Songs (Billboard)	31
US Tropical Airplay (Billboard)	4

== See also ==
- List of Billboard Tropical Airplay number ones of 1999
- List of Billboard Tropical Airplay number ones of 2000
