= Por Mujeres Como Tú =

- Album cover.

Single by Pepe Aguilar

from the album Por Mujeres Como Tú
- Released: 1998
- Genre: Mariachi bolero
- Length: 4:08
- Label: Musart
- Songwriter: Fato

Music video
- "Por Mujeres Como Tú" on YouTube

"Por Mujeres Como Tú" (Eng. "Because of Women Like You") is a song by Mexican singer Pepe Aguilar, released on his 1998 studio album of the same name. It is of Aguilar's most popular and recognized songs. The song won Billboard Latin Music Award for Hot Latin Song of the Year and was nominated in the category of Regional Mexican Hot Latin Track of the Year. It also won the Lo Nuestro Award for Regional Mexican Song of the Year in 1999.

In addition, the track was recognized as song of the year on the Regional Mexican field at the ASCAP Latin Awards. In 1999, Puerto Rican salsa singer Tito Rojas covered "Por Mujeres Como Tú" on his studio album, Alegrías y Penas. Rojas' version peaked at #1 on the Tropical Airplay, his second and final #1 before his death. Rojas' cover was nominated in the category Tropical Song of the Year at the 2000 Lo Nuestro Awards, but lost to "Píntame" by Elvis Crespo. It was recognized as one of the best-performing songs of the year at the ASCAP Latin Awards under the salsa category in 2000.

== Charts ==
=== Weekly charts ===
Weekly chart positions for "Por Mujeres Como Tú"
| Chart (1998) | Peak position |
|---|---|
| US Hot Latin Songs (Billboard) | 2 |
| US Regional Mexican Airplay (Billboard) | 2 |

=== Year-end charts ===
1998 year-end chart performance for "Por Mujeres Como Tú"
| Chart (1998) | Position |
|---|---|
| US Hot Latin Songs (Billboard) | 5 |
| US Regional Mexican Airplay (Billboard) | 4 |

== See also ==
- Billboard Hot Latin Songs Year-End Chart
- List of Billboard Tropical Airplay number ones of 1999
