= 1st Annual Latin Grammy Awards =

Music awards presented Sept 2000

1st Latin Grammy Awards
- Official poster
- Date: September 13, 2000
- Venue: Staples Center, Los Angeles, California
- Hosted by: Gloria Estefan, Jennifer Lopez, Andy García, Jimmy Smits and Antonio Banderas

Highlights
- Person of the Year: Emilio Estefan Jr.

Television/radio coverage
- Network: CBS

The 1st Annual Latin Grammy Awards were held in Los Angeles at the Staples Center on Wednesday, September 13, 2000. The big winners were Luis Miguel, Santana and Maná with 3 awards; Juan Luis Guerra, Shakira, Fito Páez and Emilio Estefan Jr. received 2 awards each.

Winners were chosen by voting members of the Latin Academy from a list of finalists. The inaugural ceremony was broadcast live on CBS that year and was seen in more than 100 countries across the world. The two-hour show was the first bilingual broadcast ever to air on network television during prime time.

== History ==
On January 20, 2000, the Latin Academy of Recording Arts & Sciences announced that the inaugural Latin Grammy Awards were going to take place on September 15, 2000, in Los Angeles and the awards ceremony would be broadcast in the United States by CBS, which will also distribute it to other countries. Nominations in 40 categories were to be released in August 2000.

The list of nominees for the 1st Annual Latin Grammy Awards, slated for September 13, 2000 in Los Angeles, was unveiled on Friday, July 7, 2000, in a Miami ceremony hosted by Michael Greene, President of the National Academy of Recording Arts & Sciences.

Leading the chase for statuettes were Marc Anthony, Shakira and Fito Páez with five nominations each. Juan Luis Guerra, Carlos Vives, and Maná, garnered four nominations. Earning three nominations were Luis Miguel, along with La Ley. Ricky Martin earned for two nominations. Christina Aguilera, received a nod on the Latin side of the musical divide for the Spanish-language remake of "Genie in a Bottle" titled "Genio Atrapado". In addition to the awards, Emilio Estefan Jr. was honored as the Latin Academy's First Latin Recording Academy Person of the Year. That award was presented during a dinner on September 11, 2000, at the Beverly Hilton Hotel in Beverly Hills, California.

The awards were organized by the Latin Academy of Recording Arts & Sciences (LARAS), incorporated by NARAS in 1997. LARAS is a membership-based association of musicians, producers, engineers and other recording professionals. The list of final nominees revealed was a result of balloting by LARAS members.

=== Live telecast ===
The list of hosts for the first-ever Latin Grammy Awards, included Gloria Estefan, Antonio Banderas, Jimmy Smits, Andy García and Jennifer Lopez, who also was announced to perform her hit single "No Me Ames" with Marc Anthony, but Anthony (with six nominations that night) did not attend the show citing complications with his (then) wife's pregnancy.

Son By Four also were announced performing a duet with boy band 'N Sync, with some singing in Spanish by the American band.

The telecast kicked off with a tribute to the late Tito Puente featuring Ricky Martin, Celia Cruz, and Gloria Estefan. Performances throughout the show included Santana & Maná, 'N Sync & Son By Four, Christina Aguilera, Shakira, Miami Sound Machine and Alejandro Fernández.

The two-hour show was the first bilingual broadcast ever to air on network television during prime time. It was broadcast around the world, either simultaneously or live on tape.

=== Compilation album ===
On September 12, 2000, Sony Discos released the first "Latin Grammy Nominees CD" to coincide with the inaugural awards with nominees from three categories, Record of the Year, Best Female Pop Vocal Performance and Best Tropical Song, with a portion of the proceeds to support the Latin Academy Of Recording Arts and Sciences for community-outreach efforts. It was expected that various labels took turns releasing Latin Grammy sets each year.

=== Nominations and winners ===
The nominations were announced on July 7, 2000 and the winners were revealed on September 13, 2000, including Maná, Luis Miguel and Santana each grabbing three trophies at the event. Santana and Maná won Record of the Year for the track "Corazón Espinado" from Santana's album, Supernatural and the same track was honored for Rock Duo or Group with Vocal. Maná also won Best Pop Performance and Santana won Best Pop Instrumental. Amarte Es Un Placer, by Mexican pop singer Luis Miguel won Album of the Year, Best Pop Album and Best Male Pop Performance. Marc Anthony's "Dímelo" picked up Song of the Year, and at age 73, Ibrahim Ferrer won Best New Artist. Emilio Estefan Jr., who was up for six honors, won only two awards: Producer of the Year and the Music Video award for directing his wife Gloria's "No Me Dejes de Querer". Meanwhile, Carlos Vives, also with six nominees, went home with no trophies. Tito Puente won posthumously for Traditional Tropical Performance for the title track from his final album, Mambo Birdland. His son and daughter accepted the award on his behalf. Winners were chosen by voting members of the Latin Academy from a list of finalists. The ceremony was broadcast live on CBS and was seen in more than 100 countries across the world.

== Awards ==
Winners are in bold text.

=== General ===
Record of the Year

Santana featuring Maná – "Corazón Espinado"

- Marc Anthony – "Dímelo"
- Rubén Blades – "Tiempos"
- Ricky Martin – "Livin' la Vida Loca"
- Carlos Vives – "Fruta Fresca"

Album of the Year

Luis Miguel – Amarte Es Un Placer

- Juan Luis Guerra 440 – Ni Es Lo Mismo Ni Es Igual
- Shakira – MTV Unplugged
- Caetano Veloso – Livro
- Carlos Vives – El Amor de Mi Tierra

Song of the Year

Marc Anthony, Robert Blades, Angie Chirino and Cory Rooney – "Dímelo" (Marc Anthony)

- Juan Carlos Calderón – "O Tú o Ninguna" (Luis Miguel)
- Fito Páez – "Al Lado del Camino"
- Juan Luis Guerra – "El Niágara en Bicicleta"
- Martin Madera – "Fruta Fresca" (Carlos Vives)

Best New Artist

Ibrahim Ferrer

- Café Quijano
- Amaury Gutiérrez
- Fernando Osorio
- Ivete Sangalo

=== Pop ===
Best Female Pop Vocal Performance

Shakira – "Ojos Así"

- Christina Aguilera – "Genio Atrapado"
- Zizi Possi – "Meu Erro"
- Mercedes Sosa – "Al Despertar"
- Jaci Velasquez – "Llegar a Ti"

Best Male Pop Vocal Performance

Luis Miguel – "Tu Mirada"

- Marc Anthony – "Dímelo"
- Alejandro Fernández – "Quiéreme"
- Ricky Martin – "Bella"
- Carlos Vives – "Fruta Fresca"

Best Pop Performance by a Duo or Group with Vocals

Maná – "Se Me Olvidó Otra Vez"

- Ketama – "Miénteme"
- Jennifer Lopez and Marc Anthony – "No Me Ames"
- Só Pra Contrariar featuring Gloria Estefan – "Santo Santo"
- Andreas Vollenweider and Milton Nascimento – "Cor Do Amor"

Best Pop Instrumental Performance

Santana – "El Farol"

- Raúl di Blasio – "El Despertar Escandalo"
- Ivan Lins – "Dois Córregos"
- Frankie Marcos featuring Arturo Sandoval – "Oh Havana, When I Think Of You"
- Nestor Torres – "Luna Latina"

Best Pop Vocal Album

Luis Miguel – Amarte Es Un Placer

- Ketama – Toma Ketama!
- Maná – MTV Unplugged
- Pablo Milanés – Vengo Naciendo
- Shakira – MTV Unplugged

=== Rock ===
Best Female Rock Vocal Performance

Shakira – "Octavo Día"

- Erica Garcia – "Vete Destino"
- Alejandra Guzmán – "Algo Natural"
- Rosario – "Jugar A La Locura"
- Cecilia Toussaint – "Como La Nada"

Best Male Rock Vocal Performance

Fito Páez – "Al Lado del Camino"

- Enrique Bunbury – "El Extranjero"
- Andrés Calamaro – "Te Quiero Igual"
- Gustavo Cerati – "Bocanada"
- Charly García – "Sweet Home Buenos Aires"

Best Rock Performance by a Duo/Group with Vocals

Santana featuring Maná – "Corazón Espinado"

- Jarabe de Palo – "Depende"
- Los Fabulosos Cadillacs – "La Vida"
- Jaguares – "Fín"
- La Ley – "Aquí"

Best Rock Song

Fito Páez – "Al Lado del Camino"

- Beto Cuevas and Aldo Nova – "Aquí" (La Ley)
- Saúl Hernández – "Fín" (Jaguares)
- Gustavo Cerati – "Puente"
- Fermin Caballero, Raul Chapa and Jason Roberts – "Si Señor" (Control Machete)

Best Rock Album

Café Tacuba – Revés/Yo Soy

- Jaguares – Bajo el Azul de Tu Misterio
- Illya Kuryaki and the Valderramas – Leche
- La Ley – Uno
- Fito Páez – Abre

=== Tropical ===
Best Salsa Album

Celia Cruz – Celia Cruz and Friends: A Night of Salsa

- Oscar D'León – La Formula Original
- Los Van Van – Llegó . . . Van Van: Van Van Is Here
- Gilberto Santa Rosa – Expresión
- Son By Four – Son By Four

Best Merengue Album

Juan Luis Guerra 440 – Ni Es Lo Mismo Ni Es Igual

- Elvis Crespo – Píntame
- Grupo Manía – Masters Of The Stage
- Hermanos Rosario – Bomba 2000
- Olga Tañón – Olga Viva, Viva Olga

Best Traditional Tropical Album

Tito Puente – Mambo Birdland

- Joe Arroyo – En Sol Mayor
- Cachao – Cuba Linda
- Ibrahim Ferrer – Buena Vista Social Club Presents Ibrahim Ferrer
- Carlos Vives – El Amor De Mi Tierra

Best Tropical Song

Juan Luis Guerra – "El Niágara en Bicicleta"

- Omar Alfanno – "A Puro Dolor" (Son By Four)
- Emilio Estefan Jr. and Kike Santander – "Da La Vuelta" (Marc Anthony)
- Martin Madera – "Fruta Fresca" (Carlos Vives)
- Robert Blades, Emilio Estefan Jr. and Gloria Estefan – "No Me Dejes de Querer" (Gloria Estefan)

=== Regional ===
Best Ranchero Album

Alejandro Fernández – Mi Verdad

- Antonio Aguilar – Consentida
- Pepe Aguilar – Por mujeres como tú
- Vicente Fernández – Vicente Fernández y los más grandes éxitos de los Dandy's
- Nydia Rojas – Si me conocieras

Best Banda Album

Banda el Recodo – Lo Mejor De Mi Vida

- Banda Arkángel R-15 – Esperando un ángel
- Banda Machos – Rancheras de oro
- Banda Maguey – Mil Gracias
- Graciela Beltrán – La reina del pueblo con banda
- Joan Sebastian – El rey del jaripeo

Best Grupero Album

Los Temerarios – En La Madrugada se Fue

- Ana Bárbara – Tu Decisión
- Conjunto Primavera – Morir de Amor
- Guardianes del amor – Un pedazo de luna
- La Mafia – Momentos

Best Tejano Album

Los Palominos – Por Eso Te Amo

- David Lee Garza & Los Musicales – Nadie como yo
- Stefani Montiel – Dulce sensación
- Bobby Pulido – El Cazador
- A.B. Quintanilla & Los Kumbia Kings – Amor, Familia Y Respeto

Best Norteño Album

Los Tigres del Norte – Herencia de Familia

- Grupo Atrapado – ¡Oh! que gusto
- Intocable – Contigo
- Los Tucanes de Tijuana – Al por mayor
- Cornelio Reyna Jr. featuring Ramón Ayala y Sus Bravos Del Norte – La leyenda continúa...

Best Regional Song

Kike Santander – "Mi Verdad" (Alejandro Fernández)

- Ricardo Ceratto – "Me Estoy Acostumbrando a Tí" (Pepe Aguilar)
- Massias – "Loco" (Alejandro Fernández)
- Juan Carlos Medrano – "El Carretonero"' (Los Rieleros del Norte)
- Edel Ramírez – "No Debes Llorar" (Los Cosmos)

=== Traditional ===
Best Folk Album

Mercedes Sosa – Misa Criolla

- Hevia – Tierra de nadie
- Los Nocheros – Nocheros
- Carlos Núñez – Os amores libres
- Totó la Momposina – Pacantó

Best Tango Album

Lito Vitale and Juan Carlos Baglietto – Postales del Alma

- Nestor Marconi – Trío Bien de arriba
- Rodolfo Mederos – Eterno Buenos Aires
- Nuevo Quinteto Real – Nuevo Quinteto Real
- Quinteto Argentino de Cuerdas – Tangos de terciopelo

Best Flamenco Album

Camarón and Tomatito – Paris 87

- Remedios Amaya – Gitana Soy
- Juan Habichuela – De la zambra al duende... un homenaje
- El Lebrijano – Lágrimas de cera
- Miguel Poveda – Suena Flamenco

=== Jazz ===
Best Jazz Album

Michel Camilo and Tomatito – Spain / Paquito D'Rivera – Tropicana Nights (tie)

- Adrian Iaies Trio – Las Tardecitas de Minton's
- Chico O'Farrill – Heart of a Legend
- Lalo Schifrin – Latin Jazz Suite

=== Brazilian ===
Best Brazilian Contemporary Pop Album

Milton Nascimento – Crooner

- Zeca Baleiro – Vo Imbola
- Ana Carolina – Ana Carolina
- Zizi Possi – Puro Prazer
- Ivete Sangalo – Ivete Sangalo

Best Brazilian Rock Album

Os Paralamas do Sucesso – Acústico MTV

- Cássia Eller – Com Vocé... Meu Mundo Ficaria Completo
- Legião Urbana – Acústico MTV
- Los Hermanos – Los Hermanos
- Raimundos – Só no Forevis

Best Samba/Pagode Album

Zeca Pagodinho – Zeca Pagodinho ao Vivo

- Alcione – Claridade
- Martinho da Vila – Lusofonia
- Velha Guarda da Portela – Tudo Azul
- Velha Guarda da Mangueira – Velha Guarda da Mangueira e Convidados

Best MPB Album

Caetano Veloso – Livro

- Maria Bethânia – A Forca Que Nunca Seca
- Gilberto Gil – O Sol de Oslo
- Joyce – Astronauta - Cancões de Elis
- Lenine – Na Pressão

Best Sertaneja Music Album

Sérgio Reis – Sérgio Reis e Convidados

- Zezé di Camargo & Luciano – Zezé di Camargo y Luciano
- Leonardo – Tempo
- Roberta Miranda – Ao Vivo - A Majestade o Sabiá
- Wilson & Soraya – Nada Foi em Vão

Best Brazilian Roots/Regional Album

Paulo Moura & Os Batutas – Pixinguinha

- Nilson Chaves – Tempo Destino: 25 Anos ao Vivo
- Dominguinhos – Voce Vai Ver o Que é Bom
- Toninho Ferragutti – Sanfonemas
- Carlos Malta and Pife Muderno – Carlos Malta e Pife Muderno

Best Brazilian Song

Djavan – "Acelerou"

- Chico César and Vanessa da Mata – "A Forca Que Nunca Seca" (Maria Bethânia)
- Marcelo Camelo – "Anna Julia" (Los Hermanos)
- Nando Reis – "O Segundo Sol" (Cássia Eller)
- Cristovão Bastos and Aldir Blanc – "Suave Veneno" (Nana Caymmi)

=== Children's ===
Best Children's Album

Miliki – A Mis Niños de 30 Años

- Maria Elizabeth del Rey – Lullabies of Latin America: Canciones de Cuna de Latinoamérica
- Daniela Luján – El diario de Daniela
- Various Artists – Ellas cantan a cri cri
- Eliana – -

=== Classical ===
Best Classical Album

Plácido Domingo – La Dolores

- Aldo Antognazzi, Paquito D'Rivera and Brenda Feliciano – Música de dos Mundos
- José María Vitier – Salmo de las Américas
- Esa-Pekka Salonen – Sensamayá: The Music of Silvestre Revueltas
- Eduardo Diazmuñoz and La Filarmonica de la Ciudad de Mexico – Twentieth Century Mexican Symphonic Music, Vol. 1

=== Production ===
Best Engineered Album

Carlos Álvarez, Mike Couzzi, Bolívar Gómez, Miguel Hernández, Luis Mansilla, Carlos Ordehl, Eric Ramos, July Ruiz, and Eric Schilling – Ni Es Lo Mismo Ni Es Igual (Juan Luis Guerra)

- Frank Filipetti – Abre (Fito Páez)
- Jerry Boys – Buena Vista Social Club Presents Ibrahim Ferrer (Ibrahim Ferrer)
- Moogie Canazio – João Gilberto Voz e Violão (João Gilberto)
- Joe Chiccarelli – Revés/Yo Soy (Café Tacuba)

Producer of the Year

Emilio Estefan Jr.

- Ry Cooder
- Rudy Pérez
- KC Porter
- Caetano Veloso

=== Music video ===
Best Music Video

Gloria Estefan – "No Me Dejes de Querer"

- Los Fabulosos Cadillacs – "La Vida"
- La Ley – "Aquí"
- Jennifer Lopez and Marc Anthony – "No Me Ames"
- Shakira – "Ojos Así"
