= Déjate Querer =

Déjate Querer may refer to:

- "Déjate Querer", 1999 song by Gilberto Santa Rosa from the album Expresión
- "Déjate Querer", 2002 song by Los Tucanes de Tijuana
- Déjate Querer, 2010 album by Pee Wee
- "Déjate Querer", 2013 song by Los Huracanes del Norte
