= Palomita Blanca (song) =

Single by Juan Luis Guerra and 4–40

from the album Ni Es lo Mismo Ni Es Igual
- Released: March 1999
- Genre: Bachata
- Length: 3:44
- Label: Karen
- Songwriter: Juan Luis Guerra
- Producer: Juan Luis Guerra

Juan Luis Guerra and 4–40 singles chronology
"Mi PC" (1998)	"Palomita Blanca" (1999)	"El Niágara en Bicicleta" (1999)

Music video
- "Palomita Blanca" on YouTube

"Palomita Blanca" (transl. "Little White Dove") is a song by Dominican Republic singer-songwriter Juan Luis Guerra and his band 4-40 from his eighth studio album, Ni Es lo Mismo Ni Es Igual (1998). As with the rest of the album, the song was written and produced by Guerra. The song was released as the second single from the album in March 1999 by Karen Records. It is a bachata acoustic ballad about a man who is immensely in love with a woman and refuses to let her go.

"Palomita Blanca" received positive reactions from music critics, with one reviewer praising the usage of the mandolin. The song was a recipient of a Broadcast Music, Inc. (BMI) Latin Award in 2000. Commercially, it topped both the Billboard Hot Latin Songs and Tropical Airplay charts in the United States. The accompanying music video was filmed in the Dominican Republic and directed by Pey Guzmán. In the video, Guerra sings with his guitar while a couple reunites with each other.

== Background and composition ==
In 1994, Guerra released his seventh studio album Fogaraté, a record consisting of soukous-influenced merengue and merengue típico. Following its release, he took a three year hiatus from recording, citing the need to take a break. "If artists lack something, it is peace. I needed to rest to find it and I found it in the figure of Jesus Christ. I called him through prayer and received his answer", Guerra stated. During the singer's hiatus, Guerra launched his own business as a director in the Dominican Republic for Mango TV and Viva FM station. On 29 October 1997, an editor for La Opinión reported that the artist had started working on a new album in Miami and he said: "I'm making "I'm making a decent album, that people like. I know the wait has been a bit long, but I'm almost sure that when the public has my new production in their hands, they will better understand why I've lasted that long without recording." In February the following year, Guerra gave an update on the progress, stating the disc would have 10 to 12 tracks including merengues, bachata, ballads, and a salsa, revealing it would be released later in 1998.

However in June 1998, Guerra was not satisfied with the material he recorded and decided to further record. Five months later, Bienvenido Rodríguez, president of Guerra's label Karen Records, revealed that the singer had wrapped up the album's production and that it would still contain the genres he announced. The record's name, Ni Es Lo Mismo, Ni Es Igual, was announced on 14 November 1998, and released on 15 December of the same year. Guerra wrote and produced all the tracks in the album including "Palomita Blanca". "Palomita Blanca" is a "mellow, acoustic-leaning" bachata ballad that utilizes a mandolin and addresses the "vicissitudes of a man who refuses to lose the woman to whom he professes intense love".

== Promotion and reception ==
"Palomita Blanca" was released as the second single from Ni Es lo Ni Es Igual in March 1999 by Karen Records. The song was later included on Guerra's compilation album Colección Romantica (2000). The music video for the track was filmed in the Dominican Republic and directed by Pey Guzmán. As with the lyrics, its synopsis is about a man who refuses to let a woman he loves profoundly to leave. The video alternates between Guerra playing with his guitar and a couple who "ultimately reunites to fulfill their love for each other".

An editor for La Prensa San Diego called the song a "beautiful bachata" that the singer "performs excellently and brings a musical innovation to that genre" and lauded the usage of the mandolin. Cary Darling of the Orange County Register "referred to it as one of the "charmer" ballads from the album alongside "Testimonio". Similarly, El Norte critic Deborah Davis cited both songs along with "Amor de Conuco" as one of the record's "moving, delicate and finely composed romantic pieces". The Hispanic magazine contributor Mark Holston felt that the track "recalls Guerra's hits of the midnineties".

"Palomita Blanca" was acknowledged as an award-winning song at the 2000 BMI Latin Awards. Commercially, "Palomita Blanca" topped the Billboard Hot Latin Songs and Tropical Airplay charts in the United States; it became Guerra's third and second number one on the charts, respectively. The song ranked number 32 on the Hot Latin Songs year-end chart.

== Charts ==
=== Weekly charts ===
Weekly chart positions for "Palomita Blanca"
Chart (1999)	Peak position
US Hot Latin Songs (Billboard)	1
US Tropical Airplay (Billboard)	1

=== Year-end charts ===
1999 year-end chart performance for "Palomita Blanca"
Chart (1999)	Position
US Hot Latin Songs (Billboard)	32

== See also ==
- List of number-one Billboard Hot Latin Tracks of 1999
- List of Billboard Tropical Airplay number ones of 1999
