= El Niagara en Bicicleta Tour =

El Niagara En Bicicleta Tour
- Tour by Juan Luis Guerra
- Associated album: Ni es lo mismo, Ni es igual
- No. of shows: 5

Juan Luis Guerra concert chronology
- Areito World Tour (1993); El Niagara En Bicicleta Tour; Tour 20 años (2004-05)

Niagara en Bicicleta Tour was a series of benefit concerts by Dominican singer-songwriter Juan Luis Guerra, between 1999 and 2000. The tour marked Guerra's return to live performances after a period away from extensive touring, following the conclusion of the Areíto Tour in 1993. The tour was organized to reconnect with audiences after the release of his 1998 album Ni es lo mismo ni es igual and preceded his next major world tour in 2004, which celebrated 20 years of his career.

== Background ==
Following the conclusion of the Areíto World Tour in 1993, Juan Luis Guerra significantly reduced his touring activity and stepped away from large-scale concert tours. During the mid-1990s, his live appearances were limited, including two promotional concerts in 1995 at Santo Domingo and San Juan to support of his album Fogaraté (1994).

In 1998, Guerra released the album Ni Es lo Mismo Ni Es Igual, which included the hit single “El Niágara en Bicicleta.” The song became one of his most recognizable works and marked a renewed moment of visibility in his career. The Niagara en Bicicleta Tour, held in 1999, was conceived as a brief return to the stage rather than a full international tour. Consisting of a limited number of performances, it allowed Guerra to reconnect with live audiences without committing to an extended touring schedule. Guerra intended to started the tour at Estadio Olimpico Felix Sanchez in Santo Domingo, however, it was moved to La Romana due the renovations for 2003 Pan American Games. One day before of the last show, Guerra stated his intention to bring the concert series to additional cities in the United States and Latin America. However, these plans did not materialize, and no official explanation was provided regarding the cancellation or expansion of the proposed dates.

The tour served as a transitional period between his early-1990s touring cycle and his next major world tour, which would not take place until 2004, when he launched the Tour 20 Años to celebrate two decades of his career.

== Tour Dates ==
Date	City	Country	Venue
December 19, 1999	La Romana	Dominican Republic	Altos de Chavon Amphiteather
February 16, 2000	Viña del Mar	Chile	Quinta Vergara Amphiteather
May 26, 2000	Acapulco	Mexico	Salon Teotihuacan
August 5, 2000	Santiago de los Caballeros	Dominican Republic	Estadio Cibao
August 21, 2000	San Juan	Puerto Rico	Hiram Bithorn Stadium

== Cancelled concerts ==
List of cancelled concerts, showing date, city, country, venue, and reason for cancellation
Date	City	Country	Venue	Reason
August 27, 2000	Miami	United States	Miami Arena	Technical Issues
