= Lo Nuestro Award for Tropical Song of the Year =

Latin music award

- Awarded for: Best Tropical Song
- Country: United States
- Presented by: Univision
- First award: 1989
- Currently held by: Marc Anthony (2014)

Highlights
- Most awards: Marc Anthony (4)
- Most nominations: Marc Anthony (16)
- Website: univision.com/premiolonuestro

The Lo Nuestro Award for Tropical Song of the Year (or Lo Nuestro Award for Tropical/Salsa Song of the Year) is an honor presented annually by American network Univision. The Lo Nuestro Awards were first awarded in 1989 and has been given annually since to recognize the most talented performers of Latin music. The nominees and winners were originally selected by a voting poll conducted among program directors of Spanish-language radio stations in the United States and also based on chart performance on Billboard Latin music charts, with the results being tabulated and certified by the accounting firm Deloitte. As of 2004, the winners are selected through an online survey. The trophy awarded is shaped in the form of a treble clef.

The award was first presented to "Ven, Devórame Otra Vez" by Puerto-Rican artist Lalo Rodríguez. American singer Marc Anthony is the most awarded performer with four awards and is also the most nominated performer with sixteen nominations. In 2001, "A Puro Dolor" by Puerto-Rican band Son by Four won Lo Nuestro Awards for both Tropical Song of the Year and Pop Song of the Year. "El Costo de la Vida" by Dominican artist Juan Luis Guerra, "Abriendo Puertas" by Cuban-American singer Gloria Estefan, "Y Hubo Alguien" and "Ahora Quién" by American performer Marc Anthony, "Suavemente" by Puerto-Rican songwriter Elvis Crespo, "Cómo Olvidar" by Puerto-Rican artist Olga Tañón, "Por Un Segundo" by Aventura, and "A Puro Dolor", earned the award and also reached number-one at the Billboard Hot Latin Songs chart. American performer Víctor Manuelle and Puerto-Rican American singers Jerry Rivera and Gilberto Santa Rosa are the most nominated performers without a win, with five unsuccessful nominations each.

== Winners and nominees ==
Listed below are the winners of the award for each year, as well as the other nominees for the majority of the years awarded.

Key	Meaning
‡	Indicates the winning song

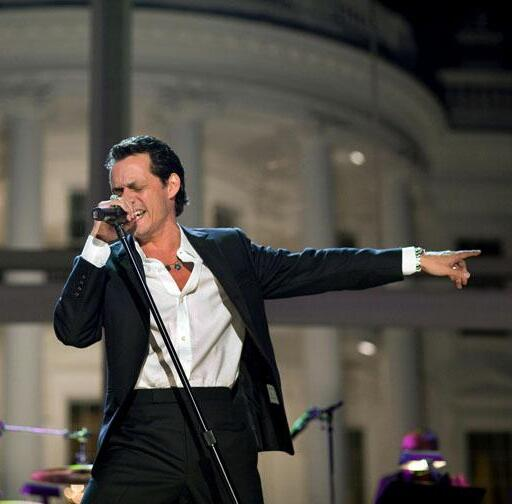
American singer Marc Anthony (pictured in 2009), the most nominated performer with sixteen nominations resulting in four wins

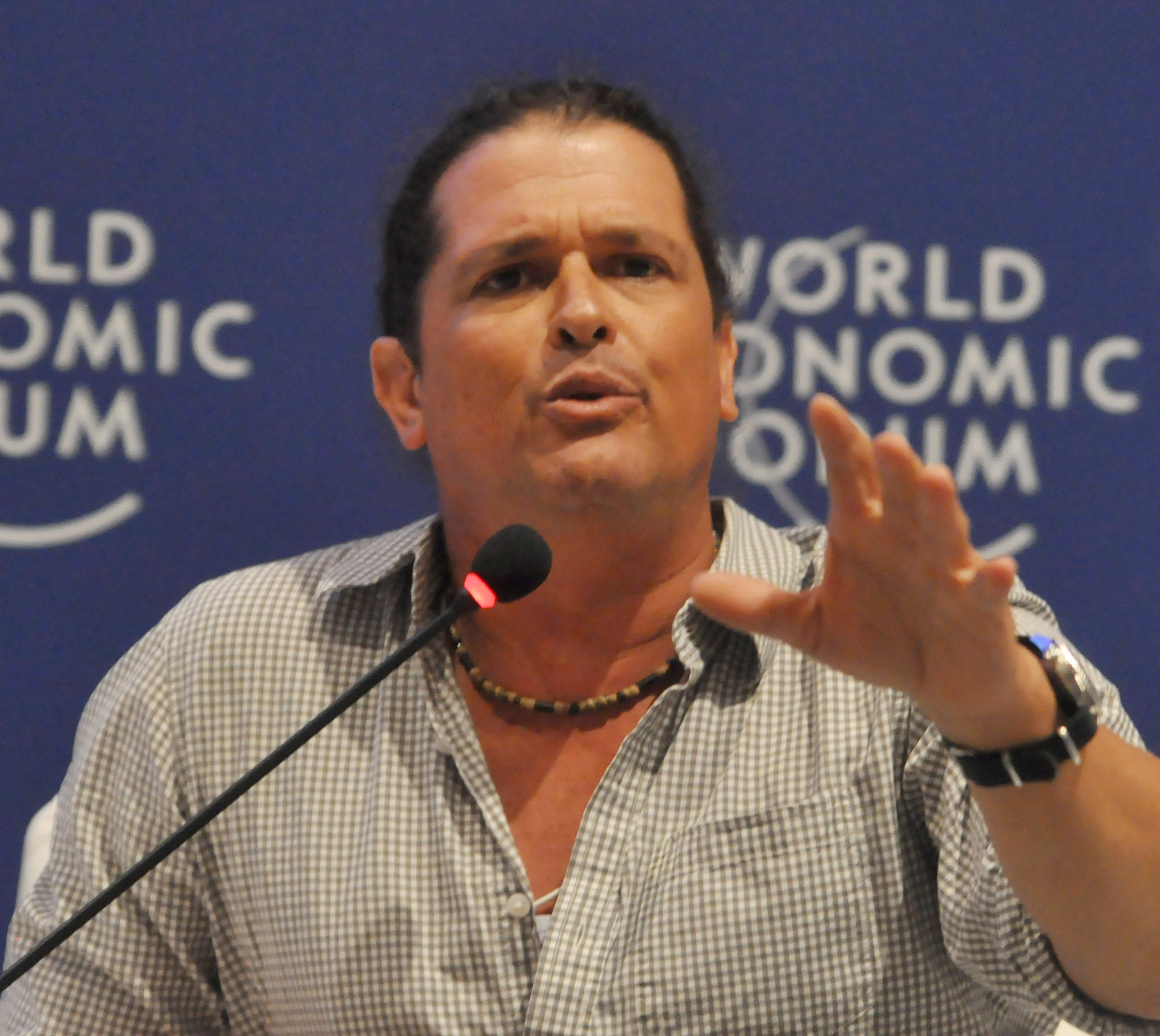
Colombian performer Carlos Vives (pictured in 2010), three-time nominee and winner in 1995

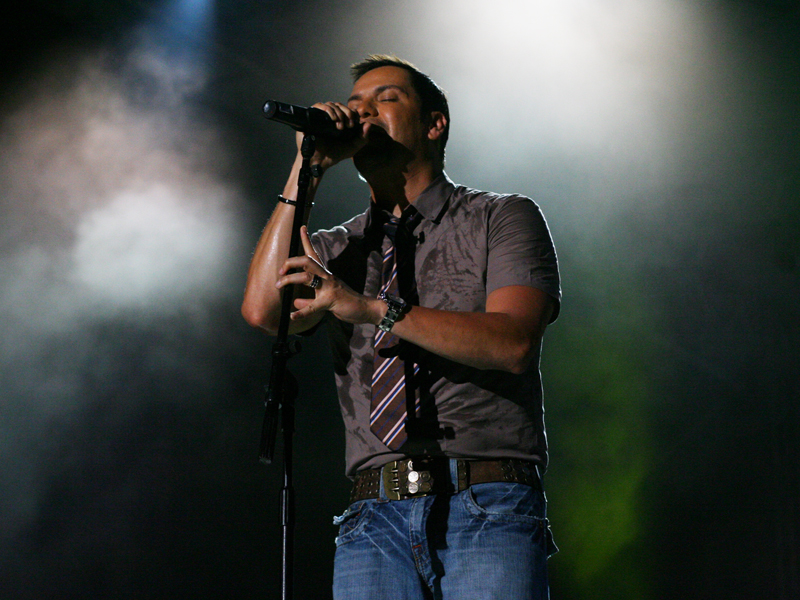
American singer Víctor Manuelle (pictured in 2007), five-time nominee

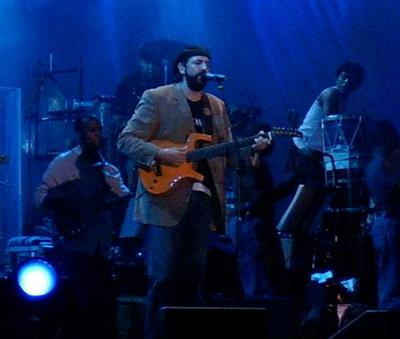
Dominican singer Juan Luis Guerra (pictured in 2005), nine-time nominee and two-time winner

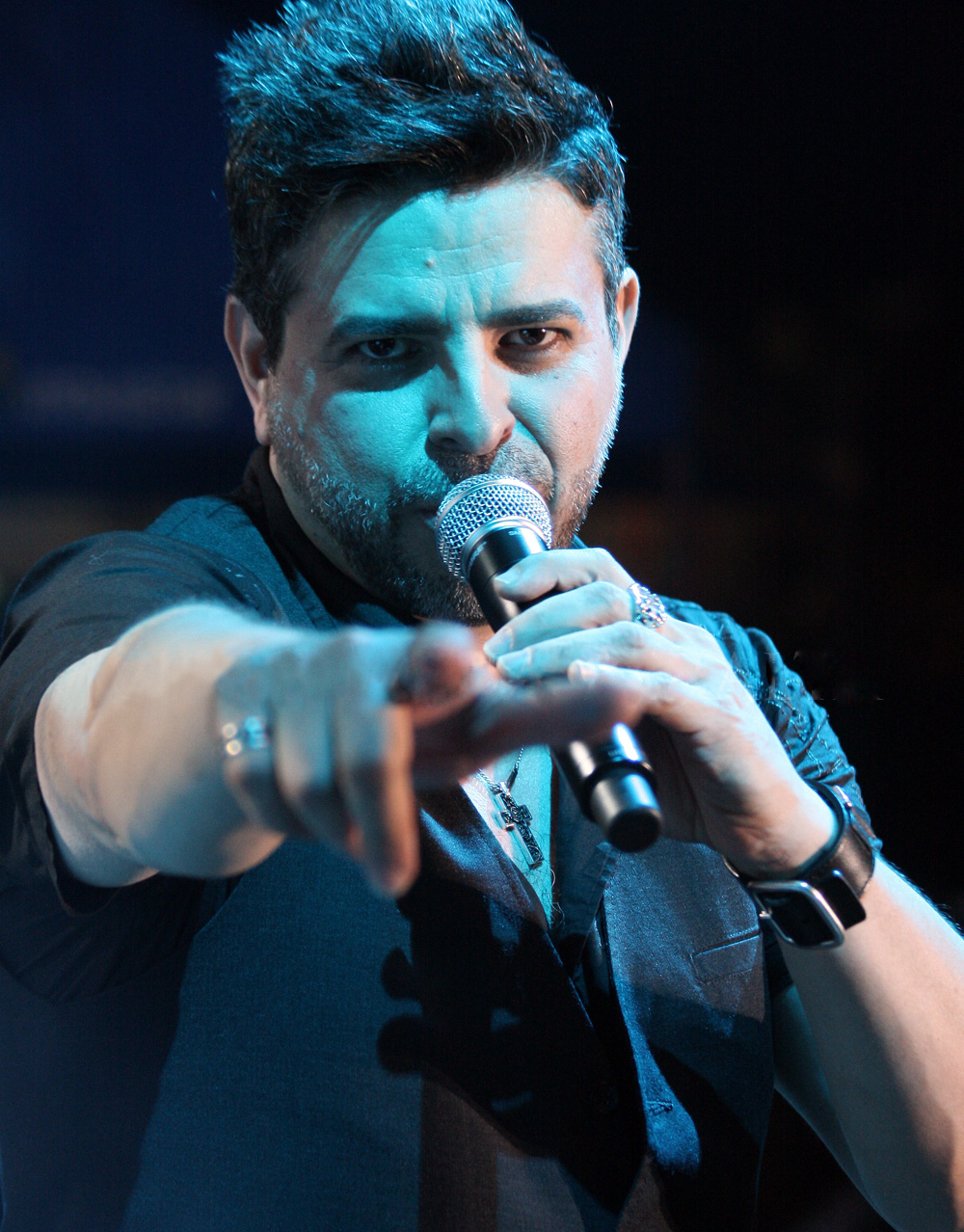
Nicaraguan performer Luis Enrique (pictured in 2010), five-time nominee and 1990 winner

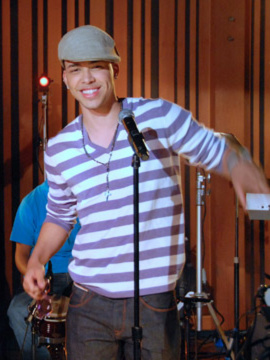
American singer Prince Royce (pictured in 2012), three-time winner, and nominee in 2014

Year	Song	Performer(s)	Ref
1989 (1st)	"Ven, Devórame Otra Vez"‡	Lalo Rodríguez	
1989 (1st)	"Cara Dura"	Max Torres	
1989 (1st)	"Cupido"	El Gran Combo de Puerto Rico	
1989 (1st)	"Lluvia"	Eddie Santiago	
1989 (1st)	"Tu No Le Amas, Le Temes"	Luis Enrique	
1990 (2nd)	"Lo Que Pasó Entre Tu y Yo... Pasó"‡	Luis Enrique	
1990 (2nd)	"Aguacero"	El Gran Combo de Puerto Rico	
1990 (2nd)	"Amame"	El Gran Combo de Puerto Rico	
1990 (2nd)	"Doce Rosas"	Tommy Olivencia	
1990 (2nd)	"Tengo Una Muñeca"	Gilberto Santa Rosa	
1991 (3rd)	"Burbujas de Amor"‡	Juan Luis Guerra y 440	
1991 (3rd)	"Sopa de Caracol"	Banda Blanca	
1991 (3rd)	"La Bilirrubina"	Juan Luis Guerra y 440	
1991 (3rd)	"Estrellitas y Duendes"	Juan Luis Guerra y 440	
1991 (3rd)	"Mi Mundo"	Luis Enrique	
1992 (4th)	"Ella Me Vacila"‡	La Banda Show	
1992 (4th)	"Ando Buscando Un Amor"	Víctor Víctor	
1992 (4th)	"Fiesta"	Banda Blanca	
1992 (4th)	"Frío, Frío"	Juan Luis Guerra y 440	
1992 (4th)	"Mesita de Noche"	Víctor Víctor	
1993 (5th)	"El Costo de la Vida"‡	Juan Luis Guerra y 440	
1993 (5th)	"Tu Amor Es Una Rueda"	Angela Carrasco	
1993 (5th)	"Lo Que Es Vivir"	Luis Enrique	
1993 (5th)	"Perfidia"	Linda Ronstadt	
1993 (5th)	"Bailando"	Frankie Ruiz	
1994 (6th)	"El Baile del Perrito"‡	Wilfrido Vargas y su Orquesta	
1994 (6th)	"Coronita de Flores"	Juan Luis Guerra	
1994 (6th)	"Hasta el Sol de Hoy"	Edgar Joel	
1994 (6th)	"Hasta Que Te Conoci"	Marc Anthony	
1994 (6th)	"Pitaste?"	Johnny Ventura	
1995 (7th)	"La Gota Fría"‡	Carlos Vives	
1995 (7th)	"Día y Noche Pienso en Ella"	Jerry Rivera	
1995 (7th)	"Mi Media Mitad"	Rey Ruiz	
1995 (7th)	"Presencié Tu Amor"	Olga Tañón	
1995 (7th)	"Vivir Lo Nuestro"	Marc Anthony and La India	
1996 (8th)	"Abriendo Puertas"‡	Gloria Estefan	
1996 (8th)	"Amor de Playa"	El Gran Combo de Puerto Rico	
1996 (8th)	"Te Conozco Bien"	Marc Anthony	
1996 (8th)	"Suave"	Jerry Rivera	
1996 (8th)	"Esperándote"	Tito Rojas	
1997 (9th)	"La Morena"‡	Ilegales	
1997 (9th)	"Mi Reina"	La Makina	
1997 (9th)	"Llegaste a Mi"	Marc Anthony	
1997 (9th)	"Hasta Ayer"	Marc Anthony	
1997 (9th)	"Loco de Amor"	Jerry Rivera	
1998 (10th)	"Y Hubo Alguien"‡	Marc Anthony	
1998 (10th)	"Rompecintura"	Los Hermanos Rosario	
1998 (10th)	"Me Cansé de Ser La Otra"	La India	
1998 (10th)	"Amor Narcótico"	Chichí Peralta	
1998 (10th)	"Serpiente Mala"	Olga Tañón	
1999 (11th)	"Suavemente"‡	Elvis Crespo	
1999 (11th)	"Para Darte Mi Vida"	Elvis Crespo and Milly Quezada	
1999 (11th)	"Contra la Corriente"	Marc Anthony	
1999 (11th)	"Agua Pasada"	Frankie Negrón	
1999 (11th)	"Una Fan Enamorada"	Servando & Florentino	
2000 (12th)	"Píntame"‡	Elvis Crespo	
2000 (12th)	"No Sabes Como Duele"	Marc Anthony	
2000 (12th)	"Bajo la Lluvia"	Grupo Manía	
2000 (12th)	"El Niágara en Bicicleta"	Juan Luis Guerra	
2000 (12th)	"Por Mujeres Como Tú"	Tito Rojas	
2001 (13th)	"A Puro Dolor"‡	Son By Four	
2001 (13th)	"Por el Caminito"	Elvis Crespo	
2001 (13th)	"Júrame"	Gisselle	
2001 (13th)	"Da la Vuelta"	Marc Anthony	
2001 (13th)	"Fruta Fresca"	Carlos Vives	
2002 (14th)	"Cómo Olvidar"‡	Olga Tañón	
2002 (14th)	"Tu Recuerdo"	Ilegales	
2002 (14th)	"Comerte a Besos"	Frankie Negrón	
2002 (14th)	"Quiero"	Jerry Rivera	
2002 (14th)	"Mi Historia Entre Tus Dedos"	Mickey Taveras	
2003 (15th)	"La Vida Es Un Carnaval"‡	Celia Cruz	
2003 (15th)	"Bandida"	Elvis Crespo	
2003 (15th)	"Cumbia Sobre el Río"	Celso Piña y su Ronda Bogotá	
2003 (15th)	"La Negra Tiene Tumbao"	Celia Cruz	
2003 (15th)	"Viviendo"	Marc Anthony	
2004 (16th)	"Barco a la Deriva"‡	Marc Anthony	
2004 (16th)	"El Tonto Que No Te Olvidó"	Víctor Manuelle	
2004 (16th)	"Herida Mortal"	Jerry Rivera	
2004 (16th)	"Sedúceme"	La India	
2004 (16th)	"Si Te Dijeron"	Gilberto Santa Rosa	
2005 (17th)	"Ahora Quién"‡	Marc Anthony	
2005 (17th)	"Creo En El Amor"	Rey Ruiz	
2005 (17th)	"Lloré Lloré"	Víctor Manuelle	
2005 (17th)	"Loca Conmigo"	Los Toros Band	
2005 (17th)	"Tengo Ganas"	Víctor Manuelle	
2006 (18th)	"Bandolero"‡	Olga Tañón	
2006 (18th)	"Hasta el Fin"	Monchy & Alexandra	
2006 (18th)	"Perdidos"	Monchy & Alexandra	
2006 (18th)	"Que Ironía"	Andy Andy	
2006 (18th)	"Se Esfuma Tu Amor"	Marc Anthony	
2007 (19th)	"No Es Una Novela"‡	Monchy & Alexandra	
2007 (19th)	"Amor de Una Noche"	N'Klabe and Julio Voltio	
2007 (19th)	"Nuestro Amor Se Ha Vuelto Ayer"	Víctor Manuelle	
2007 (19th)	"Te Mando Flores"	Fonseca	
2007 (19th)	"Tu Amor Me Hace Bien"	Marc Anthony	
2008 (20th)	"Mi Corazoncito"‡	Aventura	
2008 (20th)	"La Otra"	Ilegales & Alexandra	
2008 (20th)	"Los Infieles"	Aventura	
2008 (20th)	"Que Me Des Tu Cariño"	Juan Luis Guerra	
2008 (20th)	"Shorty Shorty"	Xtreme	
2009 (21st)	"El Perdedor"‡	Aventura	
2009 (21st)	"Como Yo"	Juan Luis Guerra	
2009 (21st)	"Conteo Regresivo"	Gilberto Santa Rosa	
2009 (21st)	"Ella Menea"	NG2	
2009 (21st)	"No Te Vayas"	Gilberto Santa Rosa	
2010 (22nd)	"Por un Segundo"‡	Aventura	
2010 (22nd)	"Eres Así"	Domenic Marte	
2010 (22nd)	"Llegó el Amor"	Gilberto Santa Rosa	
2010 (22nd)	"Marialola"	Grupo Manía	
2010 (22nd)	"Yo No Sé Mañana"	Luis Enrique	
2011 (23rd)	"Stand by Me"‡	Prince Royce	
2011 (23rd)	"Te Amaré"	Huey Dunbar	
2011 (23rd)	"Bachata en Fukuoka"	Juan Luis Guerra	
2011 (23rd)	"Estúpida"	La India	
2011 (23rd)	"Te Comencé a Querer"	Tito El Bambino	
2012 (24th)	"El Amor Que Perdimos"‡	Prince Royce	
2012 (24th)	"La Melodía"	Joey Montana	
2012 (24th)	"Llama el Sol"	Tito El Bambino	
2012 (24th)	"Llueve el Amor"	Tito El Bambino	
2012 (24th)	"You"	Romeo Santos	
2013 (25th)	"Incondicional"‡	Prince Royce	
2013 (25th)	"La Diabla"	Romeo Santos	
2013 (25th)	"Las Cosas Pequeñas"	Prince Royce	
2013 (25th)	"Mi Santa"	Romeo Santos featuring Tomatito	
2013 (25th)	"Si Tú Me Besas"	Víctor Manuelle	
2014 (26th)	"Vivir Mi Vida"	Marc Anthony	
2014 (26th)	"Llévame Contigo"	Romeo Santos	
2014 (26th)	"¿Por Qué Les Mientes?"	Tito El Bambino featuring Marc Anthony	
2014 (26th)	"Te Me Vas"	Prince Royce	
2014 (26th)	"Volví a Nacer"	Carlos Vives	
2015 (27th)	"Propuesta Indecente"	Romeo Santos	
2015 (27th)	"Darte un Beso"	Prince Royce	
2015 (27th)	"Loco"	Enrique Iglesias featuring Romeo Santos	
2015 (27th)	"Odio"	Romeo Santos featuring Drake	
2015 (27th)	"Te Robaré"	Prince Royce	

== Multiple wins/nominations ==
Number	Performer(s)
Wins
4	Marc Anthony
4	Aventura
4	Prince Royce
2	Elvis Crespo
2	Juan Luis Guerra
2	Olga Tañón
Nominations
16	Marc Anthony
10	Juan Luis Guerra
5	Elvis Crespo
5	Luis Enrique
5	Jerry Rivera
5	Prince Royce
5	Gilberto Santa Rosa
5	Víctor Manuelle
4	Aventura
4	El Gran Combo de Puerto Rico
4	La India
4	Romeo Santos
4	Tito El Bambino
4	Olga Tañón
3	Ilegales
3	Monchy & Alexandra
3	Carlos Vives
2	Banda Blanca
2	Celia Cruz
2	Grupo Manía
2	Frankie Negrón
2	Tito Rojas
2	Rey Ruiz
2	Víctor Víctor

== See also ==
- Latin Grammy Award for Best Tropical Song
