= News director =

Profession

A news director is an individual at a broadcast station or network who is in charge of the news department. In local news, the news director is typically in charge of the entire news staff, including journalists, news presenters, photographers, copy writers, television producers, and other technical staff. The director also keeps track of how the show is going on, as well as communicating with the producer on matters pertaining to the broadcast.

Typically, the only individual at a station/network or publication who wields more power than the news director is a general manager or company president.

The Radio Television Digital News Association (RTDNA), in partnership with the Newhouse School at Syracuse University, conducts an annual survey of broadcast news salaries and newsroom conditions. According to its 2024 survey, news directors account for approximately 6% of unfilled positions in local television newsrooms, reflecting persistent recruitment challenges in the role. More than 85% of TV news directors have reported difficulty recruiting staff in recent years. Salary levels for news directors vary significantly by market size, with major market positions commanding substantially higher compensation than smaller market counterparts. The RTDNA also publishes ethical guidelines and professional standards for news directors through its Code of Ethics, which addresses editorial independence, conflicts of interest, and the relationship between news directors and station ownership.

== See also ==
- Director of network programming
