= Ni Es lo Mismo Ni Es Igual =

Ni Es Lo Mismo Ni Es Igual

Studio album by Juan Luis Guerra
- Released: 15 December 1998
- Recorded: 1997–1998
- Studios: 440 Studio; New River Studios (New York City); Crescent Moon Studios; Critiera Moon Studios (Miami, Florida); Kíu & Midilab (Santo Domingo, Dominican Republic)
- Genre: Merengue · bachata · salsa · acoustic
- Length: 37:24
- Label: Karen
- Producer: Juan Luis Guerra

Juan Luis Guerra chronology
Fogaraté (1994)	Ni Es Lo Mismo Ni Es Igual (1998)	Colección Romantica (2000)

Singles from Ni Es Lo Mismo Ni Es Igual
- 1. "Mi PC" Released: 5 October 1998; 2. "Palomita Blanca" Released: 16 November 1998; 3. "El Niágara en Bicicleta" Released: 1 March 1999; 4. "La Hormiguita" Released: 9 August 1999

Ni Es lo Mismo, Ni Es Igual (transl. Neither Is It The Same Nor Is It Equal) is the eighth studio album recorded by Dominican singer-songwriter Juan Luis Guerra and his band 4.40. It was released by Karen Records on 15 December 1998 (see 1998 in music) and distributed by PolyGram Latino. It was Guerra's comeback album after four years of silence, out of the public eye and since his conversion to Christianity. It was his first studio album since Fogarate (1994). The album production and songwriting were done by Guerra. The album was supported by the release of four official singles: "Mi PC", "Palomita Blanca", "El Niagara en Bicicleta" and "La Hormiguita". Two singles were released as promotional singles: "Vale La Pena" and "Quisiera".

Ni Es lo Mismo Ni Es Igual production returned to his jazz roots of his previous works, such as El Original 440 (1984), Mudanza y Acarreo (1985) and Mientras Más Lo Pienso...Tú (1987). It explores tropical rhythms such as bachata, merengue and salsa but also solfter tunes such as ballad and classical. Also, it encompasses music genres such as funk and reggae. It explores lyrics and themes ranging from christianity, romance and protest against political corruption.

The album received acclaim from critics; it received four nominations at the 1st Annual Latin Grammy Awards including Album of the Year. It won Best Merengue Album. The album peaked at No. 4 on the Top Latin Albums and No. 2 on the Tropical Albums chart and received a double-platinum certification (Latin Field) by the RIAA for selling over 400,000 copies. Also, it was certified platinum in Spain for selling 100,000 copies. Two singles from the album reached No. 1 on the Hot Latin Tracks chart. The album sold over one million of copies in the first four months after its release. To promote the album, Guerra embarked on a series of performances and concerts including the group's official comeback at Altos de Chavon in 1998 and Viña del Mar International Festival in 2000 titled El Niagara en Bicicleta Tour.

== Background ==
Juan Luis Guerra stated that his style of music was influenced by The Beatles, American rock, folk, R&B, jazz, and traditional Dominican music. His style of songwriting has been known to take on a poetic feel and address romantic and social issues. Guerra started his career with the release of Soplando. His fifth studio album, Bachata Rosa (1990), received a Grammy Award for Best Tropical Album. KAREN, a Dominican-independent record label, was involved with Guerra's previous albums and helped produced Ni Es Lo Mismo Ni Es Igual. According to Guerra, he remained with KAREN because they gave him the opportunity to set up his own recording schedule.

Following the end of the Areito World Tour in December 1993, Guerra announced his retirement from doing concerts and live presentations, stating that he would instead be producing other artists' albums.

Ni Es Lo Mismo Ni Es Igual was the first studio album by Guerra since 1994's Fogaraté. The recording sessions were set to start in February 1996, but Guerra declined due to personal issues including conversion to Christianity and taking a break from the music industry.

In late 1996, it was announced that Guerra had come back to the studio to record a new acoustic album. In a press note in November 1996, the artist stated that following the consolidation of his business (radio station Viva FM and TV station Mango TV), he would return to the studio in 1997 and record two albums. The first would be acoustic music, according to Guerra in press statements, and would include meringues, but "treated in a different way." The other would have romantic themes. He explained: "I really want to make an acoustic production, in which I can play some songs that I have saved. Even work on some meringues treated in a different way. I have always thought about that and I think it is time to do it."

== Writing and composition ==
For Ni Es Lo Mismo Ni Es Igual, Guerra continues his aforementioned take on songs about love and social issues. "El Niágara en Bicicleta" takes on the impossibility of obtaining medical treatment in a third world hospital, and compares it to crossing Niagara Falls on a bicycle. He based the song on a trip to a hospital in which the equipment was either unavailable or broken down. The song "Mi PC" combines lyrics and the sound of merengue to compare a woman to a personal computer. "Quisiera" is a salsa theme song that was co-written by Guerra and Colombian songwriter Kike Santander. Guerra also produced ballad songs for the album such as "Testimonio" and "Amapola". In addition, Guerra remade "Amor de Conuco" from his album, Mientras Más Lo Pienso...Tú (1987), into a ballad version.

== Singles ==
Four singles were released from the album. The first single, "Mi PC", reached No. 1 on Hot Latin Tracks and became his second song to reach No. 1 on the chart. The second single, "Palomita Blanca" (Little White Dove), also reached No. 1 on the Hot Latin Tracks chart. The third single, "El Niágara en Bicicleta", peaked at No. 2 on the Hot Latin Tracks chart and 4 in Dominican Airplay The fourth and final single, "La Hormiguita" (The Little Ant), only made the Latin Pop Airplay chart, peaking at No. 33.

== Critical reception ==
Professional ratings
Review scores
Source	Rating
Allmusic	5/5 stars

Ni Es Lo Mismo Ni Es Igual was met with positive reaction from critics. Evan Gutierrez of Allmusic gave the album a five-star rating, commenting that "Guerra offers delightful surprise in song after song." Guerra expressed his surprise at the success of the album and compared it to one of his earlier albums, Bachata Rosa. John Lannert from Billboard, choice Ni es lo mismo ni es igual as the best Latin album of 1999.

On the 42nd Grammy Awards, the album received a Grammy Award nomination for Best Latin Pop Performance, which it lost to Tiempos by Ruben Blades. At the first Latin Grammy Awards in 2000, the album received two Latin Grammy Awards for "Best Merengue Performance" and "Best Engineered Album". The album was also nominated for Album of the Year, which it lost to Luis Miguel's Amarte Es Un Placer.

== Commercial performance ==
Ni Es Lo Mismo Es Igual was released on 15 December 1998, four years after his previous album, Fogaraté, in 1994. The album debuted and peaked at No. 4 on Top Latin Albums, where it remained for two non-consecutive weeks. On the Tropical Albums chart, the album also debuted and peaked at No. 2 for four consecutive weeks, in which the No. 1 spot was being held off by Elvis Crespo's Suavemente. As of July 2004, the album has sold over 400,000 copies in the United States. The album sold over one million copies worldwide, including 100,000 copies in Spain and 450,000 in the United States.

== Track listing ==
All tracks are written by Juan Luis Guerra.

No.	Title	Length
1.	"Mi PC"	3:16
2.	"Vale la Pena"	3:27
3.	"La Hormiguita"	3:04
4.	"Quisiera"	3:50
5.	"El Niágara en Bicicleta"	4:25
6.	"Palomita Blanca"	3:44
7.	"Testimonio"	4:18
8.	"Amapola"	3:05
9.	"El Primo"	3:47
10.	"Sobremesa"	1:19
11.	"Amor de Conuco (Bonus Track)"	3:09
Total length:		37:24

== Personnel ==
The following credits are from Allmusic.

=== Performers ===
- Edwin Bonilla – Percussion
- Ed Calle – Baritone
- Audrey Campos – Vocals, coro
- Frank Ceara – Vocals, coro
- Luis Enrique – Percussion
- Juan Luis Guerra – Guitar, arranger, director, producer, Vocal Arrangement
- Lee Levin – Drums, Programming
- Mariela Mercado – Vocals, coro
- Jimmy Morales – Conga
- Juan Rizek – Vocals, coro
- Janina Rosado – Writer
- Arturo Sandoval – Trumpet, Flugelhorn
- Kike Santander – Composer
- Charlie Sierra – Bongos, Timbales
- Juan Valdez – Piano
- Eugenio Vanderhorst – Writer

=== Technical ===
- Carlos Álvarez – Engineer
- Scott Kirkland – Assistant Engineer
- Luis Mansilla – Engineer
- Carlos Ordehi – Engineer
- Eric Ramos – Engineer
- Eric Schilling – Engineer, Mixing
- July Ruiz – Engineer

== Charts ==
Chart (1999)	Peak position
Spanish Albums (PROMUSICAE)	17
U.S. Billboard Top Heatseekers	24
U.S. Billboard Top Latin Albums	4
U.S. Billboard Tropical Albums	2

== Certifications and Sales ==
Region	Certification	Certified units/sales
Spain (Promusicae)	Platinum	100,000
United States (RIAA)	2× Platinum (Latin)	450,000

== See also ==
- 1998 in Latin music
