= 2000 Billboard Latin Music Awards =

7th annual Billboard Latin Music Awards

- Date: April, 2000
- Venue: Jackie Gleason Theater, Miami Beach, Florida

The 7th annual Billboard Latin Music Awards, which honor the most popular albums, songs, and performers in Latin music, took place in Miami.

== Pop Album of the Year, Male ==
- Luis Miguel — Amarte Es Un Placer
- Marco Antonio Solís — Trozos de Mi Alma
- Cristian Castro — Mi Vida Sin Tu Amor
- Carlos Ponce — Todo lo que soy

== Pop album of the year, group ==
- MTV Unplugged — Maná
- Amor, Familia y Respeto — A.B. Quintanilla y Los Kumbia Kings
- Mi Gloria Eres Tu — Los Tri-O
- Un Poco Mas — MDO

== Pop album of the year, female ==
- Noelia — Noelia
- Llegar A Ti — Jaci Velasquez
- Corazón — Ednita Nazario
- Te Acordarás de Mí — Olga Tañón

== Pop album of the year, new artist ==
- Amor, Familia y Respeto — A.B. Quintanilla y Los Kumbia Kings
- Llegar A Ti — Jaci Velasquez
- Comenzaré — Luis Fonsi
- Noelia — Noelia

== Latin Pop Track of the Year ==
- Ricky Martin — Livin' la Vida Loca
- Ricky Martin — Bella
- Enrique Iglesias — Bailamos
- Alejandro Fernandez — Loco

== Tropical/salsa album of the year, male ==
- Píntame — Elvis Crespo
- Buena Vista Social Club Presents Ibrahim Ferrer — Ibrahim Ferrer
- Inconfundible — Víctor Manuelle
- El Amor de Mi Tierra — Carlos Vives

== Tropical/salsa album of the year, female ==
- Sola — La India
- Olga Viva, Viva Olga — Olga Tañón
- Atada — Gisselle
- Con los Pies Sobre la Tierra — Melina León

== Tropical/salsa album of the year, group ==
- Gotcha! — DLG
- Masters of the Stage: 2000 Veces Manía — Grupomania (Universal Latino)
- Para El Bailador — La Makina
- Séptima Harmonía — Limi-T 21

== Tropical/salsa album of the year, new artist ==
- Buena Vista Social Club Presents Ibrahim Ferrer — Ibrahim Ferrer
- Caminando — Tony Tun Tun
- Sublime Ilusión — Eliades Ochoa
- Entrega — George Lamond

== Tropical/salsa track of the year ==
- El Niágara en Bicicleta — Juan Luis Guerra
- No Me Ames — Jennifer Lopez and Marc Anthony
- Píntame — Elvis Crespo
- Pero Dile — Víctor Manuelle

== Regional Mexican album of the year, male ==
- Mi Verdad — Alejandro Fernandez
- Por Una Mujer Bonita — Pepe Aguilar
- Por El Amor De Siempre — Pepe Aguilar
- Los Mas Grandes Exitos de los Dandy's — Victor Fernández

== Regional Mexican album of the year, male group ==
- Nuestro Amor — Los Tri-O
- Alma — Conjunto Alma Norteña
- Contigo — Intocable
- Herencia De Familia — Los Tigres del Norte

== Regional Mexican album of the year, female group or female solo artist ==
- Corazón de Cristal — Priscila y Sus Balas de Plata
- En Vivo--En Concierto — Grupo Límite
- Arrancame A Puños — Yesenia Flores
- Todo Por Tí — Priscila y Sus Balas de Plata

== Regional Mexican album of the year, new artist ==
- Nuestro Amor — Los Tri-O
- Alma — Conjunto Alma Norteña
- La Magia Del Amor — Los Ángeles de Charly
- Donde Estás Corazón — Pablo Montero

== Regional Mexican track of the year ==
- Lágrimas — Los Tigres del Norte
- El Peor de Mis Fracasos — Marco Antonio Solís
- Si Te Pudiera Mentir — Marco Antonio Solís
- Te Quiero Mucho — Los Rieleros del Norte

== Latin rock/fusion album of the year ==
- Fundamental — Puya
- Bajo el Azul de Tu Misterio — Jaguares
- Resurrection — Chris Pérez Band
- Tres — Fiel a la Vega

== Hot Latin Track of the Year ==
- Loco — Alejandro Fernandez
- No Me Ames — Jennifer Lopez and Marc Anthony
- Livin' la Vida Loca — Ricky Martin
- Si Te Pudiera Mentir — Marco Antonio Solís

== Latin rap album of the year ==
- Los grandes éxitos en español — Cypress Hill
- Apocalypshit — Molotov
- El Padrino — Fulanito

== Hot Latin Tracks of the Year, Vocal Duo ==
- No Me Ames — Jennifer Lopez and Marc Anthony
- Santo Santo — Só Pra Contrariar and Gloria Estefan
- Escondidos — Olga Tañón and Cristian Castro
- La persona equivocada — Melina León and Víctor Manuelle

== Latin Dance Maxi-Single of the Year ==
- Santo Santo — Só Pra Contrariar and Gloria Estefan
- Ritmo Total — Enrique Iglesias
- Bailando — Angelina
- Que Te Vas — George Lamond

== Contemporary Latin jazz album of the year ==
- Los Hombres Calientes — Los Hombres Calientes
- Inner Voyage — Gonzalo Rubalcaba
- Latin Soul — Poncho Sanchez
- Briyumba Palo Congo — Chucho Valdés

== The Billboard Latin 50 Artist of the year ==
- Elvis Crespo
- Enrique Iglesias
- Ricky Martin
- Selena

== Hot Latin Tracks Artist of the Year ==
- Enrique Iglesias
- Ricky Martin
- Marco Antonio Solis
- Christian Castro

== Songwriter of the Year ==
- Marco Antonio Solis
- Kike Santander
- Juan Gabriel
- Rudy Pérez

== Producer of the Year ==
- Pedro Ramírez
- Rudy Pérez
- Bebu Silvetti
- Kike Santander

== Publisher of the year ==
- Warner-Tamerlane
- BMG Songs
- Ventura

== Publishing corporation of the year ==
- Warner/Chappell Music
- Universal Music
- EMI Music

== Billboard Lifetime achievement award ==
- Jorge Pinos

== Billboard Latin Music Hall of Fame ==
- Marco Antonio Solís
