= Al Despertar (Mercedes Sosa song) =

Al Despertar is a 1998 song by Mercedes Sosa with lyrics by Peteco Carabajal from her album Al Despertar (1998). Sosa's recording was nominated for Best Female Performance at the first ever Latin Grammy Awards of 2000. The lyrics commence "Al despertar a un nuevo sol, vuelvo a nacer."
