= Mi PC =

Single by Juan Luis Guerra & 4-40

from the album Ni Es lo Mismo Ni Es Igual
- Released: November 1998
- Genre: Pop; merengue
- Length: 3:16
- Label: Karen
- Songwriter: Juan Luis Guerra
- Producer: Juan Luis Guerra

Juan Luis Guerra & 4-40 singles chronology
"El Beso de la Ciguatera" (1995)	"Mi PC" (1998)	"Palomita Blanca" (1998)

"Mi PC" (transl. "My PC") is a song by Dominican Republic singer-songwriter Juan Luis Guerra and his band 4-40 from his eighth studio album, Ni Es lo Mismo Ni Es Igual (1998). The song was released as the lead single from the album in November 1998 by Karen Records. The song was written and produced by Guerra. It is a pop merengue track in which Guerra uses computer terminology to narrate a love story. "Mi PC" was met with positive reactions from music critics who found the lyrics to be clever and its music catchy.

Commercially, it topped both the Billboard Hot Latin Songs and Tropical Airplay charts in the United States. Guerra performed the track live at the Altos de Chavón amphitheater in the Dominican Republic in 1999 and the 2000 Viña del Mar Festival in Chile. The song was a recipient of a Broadcast Music, Inc. (BMI) Latin Award in 2001.

== Background and composition ==
In 1994, Juan Luis Guerra released his seventh studio album, Fogaraté, a record consisting of soukous-influenced merengue and merengue típico. Following its release, he took a three-year hiatus from recording, citing the need to take a break. "If artists lack something, it is peace. I needed to rest to find it and I found it in the figure of Jesus Christ. I called him through prayer and received his answer", Guerra states. During the singer's hiatus, Guerra launched his own business as a director in the Dominican Republic for Mango TV and Viva FM station. On 29 October 1997, an editor for La Opinión reported that the artist had started working on a new album in Miami. "I'm making a decent album, that people like. I know the wait has been a bit long, but I'm almost sure that when the public has my new production in their hands, they will better understand why I've lasted that long without recording." On February the following year, the singer gave an update on the progress, stating the disc would have 10 to 12 tracks including merengues, bachata, ballads, and a salsa, and that would be released in middle of the year.

However, in June 1998, Guerra was not satisfied with the material he recorded and decided to further record. Five months later, Bienvenido Rodríguez, president of Guerra's label, Karen Records, revealed that the singer had wrapped up the album's productions and that it would still contain the aforementioned musical genres. The record's name, Ni Es Lo Mismo, Ni Es Igual, was announced on 14 November 1998, and released on 15 December of the same year. Guerra wrote and produced all the tracks in the album including the opening song "Mi PC". "Mi PC" is a pop merengue song in which Guerra "harmonizes the modern language of computers with the language of feelings." Lyrically, the singer utilizes the "jargon of computers and cybernetics to narrate a beautiful love story." According to Guerra, he had to learn about computer terminologies from his nephews.

== Reception and promotion ==
"Mi PC" was released as the lead single from Ni Es lo Mismo Ni Es Igual by Karen Records in November 1998. AllMusic reviewer Evan C. Gutierrez found it to be one of the album's "humorous and rollicking merengues". Billboard's John Lannert described it as a "cute, chart-topping pop/merengue hit". Cary Darling of the Orange County Register regarded the track to be a "likable merengue fluff" with an "ode to the modern computer age". The Hispanic magazine contributor Mark Holston lauded "Mi PC" as a "merengue elevated above its dance track pretensions by coy lyrics based on computer-dominated contemporary life." Ramiro Burr of the San Antonio Express-News praised the track as a "feverish merengue about an Internet romance."

In a mixed review of Ni Es lo Mismo Ni Es, El Norte's Deborah Davis cited "Mi PC" as one of songs from the album that is "moving and intelligent". Jacob Edgar of The Beat magazine called the single a "Juan Luis Guerra classic" and felt it "rivals" "A Pedir Su Mano" from Bachata Rosa (1990). The Knight Ridder critic Fernando Gonzalez admired the track as a "catchy merengue that plays on the imagery and language of our computer-enhanced lives".

Commercially, "Mi PC" topped the Billboard Hot Latin Songs and Tropical Airplay charts in the United States; the single spent five weeks at this position on the latter chart. It was acknowledged as an award-winning song at the 2001 BMI Latin Awards. Guerra performed the song live at the Altos de Chavón amphitheater in La Romana, Dominican Republic on 18 December 1999, and at the 2000 Viña del Mar Festival.

== Charts ==
=== Weekly charts ===
Weekly chart positions for "Mi PC"
Chart (1998)	Peak position
US Hot Latin Songs (Billboard)	1
US Tropical Airplay (Billboard)	1

=== Year-end charts ===
1999 year-end chart performance for "Mi PC"
Chart (1999)	Position
US Hot Latin Songs (Billboard)	28
US Tropical Airplay (Billboard)	9

== See also ==
- List of number-one Billboard Hot Latin Tracks of 1998
- List of number-one Billboard Hot Latin Tracks of 1999
- List of Billboard Tropical Airplay number ones of 1998
- List of Billboard Tropical Airplay number ones of 1999
