= Ese (song) =

Single by Jerry Rivera

from the album De Otra Manera
- Released: 1998
- Studio: Extreme Music-Musica Futura (Miami, FL); Mixing Recording Studio; Telesound (San Juan, Puerto Rico)
- Genre: Latin pop · Salsa · bolero · latin ballad
- Length: 3:25 (Ballad version); 4:19 (Salsa version)
- Label: Sony Discos
- Songwriter: Alejandro Jaén · William Paz
- Producer: Alejandro Jaén · J. Salazar · Ramón B. Sánchez

Jerry Rivera singles chronology
"Vuela Libre" (1998)	"Ese" (1998)	"De Que Vale Ser un Rey" (1999)

"Ese" (English: He's The One) is a song performed by Puerto Rican-American singer Jerry Rivera from his ninth studio album De Otra Manera (1998). The song became his first #1 on the Hot Latin Tracks chart and fifth overall on the Tropical Airplay chart. It was acknowledged as an award-winning song at the 2000 BMI Latin Awards. Two versions of the song were recorded, one in salsa and the other a bolero. The success of releasing two versions of the song to Latin radio stations led to Sony Discos having their artists record multiple versions of the same song. José A. Estévez Jr. of AllMusic felt that Rivera "demonstrates with conviction" in the song. Eliseo Cardona of El Nuevo Herald stated that the song "can be taken as a signal of alert (and also of alarm) It shows in any case that it was already time to get out of the monotony accumulated by his discography After listening to the song (also recorded in salsa) it is force majeure to recognize that the latter was fulfilled." The song was later featured as the main theme for the Mexican telenovela Mirada de mujer (1998). The music video for the song featured the ballad version and was directed by Steve Bielo.

== Charts ==
=== Weekly charts ===
Chart performance for "Ese"
Chart (1999)	Peak position
US Hot Latin Songs (Billboard)	1
US Latin Pop Airplay (Billboard) Ballad version	2
US Tropical Airplay (Billboard) Salsa version	1

=== Year-end charts ===
1999 year-end chart performance for "Ese"
Chart (1999)	Position
US Hot Latin Songs (Billboard)	12
US Tropical Airplay (Billboard)	4

== See also ==
- List of number-one Billboard Hot Latin Tracks of 1999
- List of Billboard Tropical Airplay number ones of 1999
