= Píntame (song) =

Single by Elvis Crespo

from the album Píntame
- B-side: "Suavemente (Hot Head Mix)"
- Released: 1999
- Genre: Merengue
- Length: 4:20
- Label: Sony Discos
- Songwriter: Elvis Crespo
- Producer: Luis Angel Cruz • Robert Cora

Elvis Crespo singles chronology
"Nuestra Canción" (1999)	"Píntame" (1999)	"Tiembo" (1999)

Music video
- "Píntame" on YouTube

"Píntame" (transl. "Paint Me") is a song by Puerto Rican American singer Elvis Crespo from his 1999 second studio album of the same name. The song was written by Crespo with Luis Angel Cruz and Robert Cora handling its productions. It is a merengue song in which Crespo asks an artist to materialize his lover by painting her. The song was met with positive reactions from three music critics who found the song to be catchy. An accompanying music video for the single features Crespo dancing with other performers in a white background.

Commercially, "Píntame" peaked at number two and one on the Billboard Hot Latin Songs and Tropical Airplay charts in the United States. An English-language version of the song was released to dance radio stations in the US. The track garnered several accolades including the Lo Nuestro Award for Tropical Song of the Year in 2000. In 2019, Dominican Republic singer Gabriel Pagán covered the song with Crespo and their version topped the merengue charts in the Dominican Republic.

== Background and composition ==
In 1998, Elvis Crespo released his solo debut album, Suavemente, which became an immediate success by topping the Billboard Top Latin Albums chart in the United States. Its first two singles, the title track and "Tu Sonrisa" reached number one on the Billboard Hot Latin Songs in the US and was certified platinum by the Recording Industry Association of America. This led to Crespo to launch a follow-up record to Suavemente in 1999 titled Píntame. According to the singer: After recording a disc like Suavemente, which became a notable hit and inspired me, the most important thing of the time is to enter the studio a consistent disc that demonstrates my versatility as a vocalist". Like its predecessor, it is a merengue album with "danceable tropical music". One of the merengues in the album is the title track, in which Crespo "yearns for his ladylove to materialize at the tip of a painter's brush." The song was written by Crespo with productions being handled by Luis Angel Cruz and Robert Cora.

== Promotion and reception ==
"Píntame" was released as the album's lead single in 1999 by Sony Discos. An English-language remix of the song was released to dance radio stations in the US. The accompanying music video for the song features Crespo performing the track along with other dancers in a white background. Crespo performed the song live in Las Vegas in 2008 and was later included in his live album, Elvis Crespo Lives: Live from Las Vegas (2008). The original version was featured on Crespo's compilation album Suavemente...Los Exitos (2008). An editor for Allmusic praised the saxophones for carrying "the title track to a fever pitch". In spite of the availability of English-language remixes of the single, Leila Cobo of the Redding Record Searchlight suggested that "for a real experience", listeners should "move to the album’s frenetic tunes in Spanish like the title track". The Orlando Sentinel critic Parry Gettelman called it one of the album's "best cuts". A writer for Vibe found to be "übercatchy"

At the 12th Annual Lo Nuestro Awards in 2000", "Píntame" won Tropical Song of the Year. In the same year, the song was nominated in the category of "Tropical/Salsa Track of the Year" at the 7th Annual Billboard Latin Music Awards. The record was also nominated for "Best Merengue Song" the 1999 Premios Globos, but ultimately lost both awards to "El Niágara en Bicicleta" (1998) by Juan Luis Guerra. It was acknowledged as an award-winning song at the 2001 BMI Latin Awards. Commercially, "Píntame" peaked at number two on the Billboard Hot Latin Songs chart and became his third number one on the Tropical Airplay chart in the US. The track was the third best-performing tropical song of the year in the US. In 2019, Dominican Republic singer Gabriel Pagán covered "Píntame" on his studio album, Morisoñando, Vol. 1, with Crespo's participation. Their version peaked at number 15 on the Tropical Airplay chart and topped the merengue charts in the Dominican Republic according to Monitor Latino.

== Formats and track listings ==
Promotional single

1. Píntame – 4:20
2. Suavemente (Hot Head Mix) – 3:16

The Remixes

1. Pintame (Off The Hook Club) – 7:49
2. Pintame (Hothead Mix) – 6:42
3. Pintame (Cibola Mix) – 6:10
4. Pintame (Eddie's Painted Dance Mix) – 6:04

== Charts ==
=== Weekly charts ===
Weekly chart positions for "Píntame"
Chart (1999)	Peak position
US Hot Latin Songs (Billboard)	2
US Tropical Airplay (Billboard)	1
Spain (PROMUSICAE)	7

Weekly chart positions for "Píntame"
Chart (2010)	Peak position
Spain (PROMUSICAE)	42

Weekly chart positions for Gabriel Pagán and Elvis Crespo's version
Chart (2019)	Peak position
Dominican Republic Merengue (Monitor Latino)	1
US Tropical Airplay (Billboard)	15

=== Year-end charts ===
1999 year-end chart performance for "Píntame"
Chart (1999)	Position
US Hot Latin Songs (Billboard)	19
US Tropical Airplay (Billboard)	3

2019 year-end chart performance for Gabriel Pagán and Elvis Crespo's version
Chart (2019)	Position
Dominican Republic Merengue (Monitor Latino)	35
US Tropical Airplay (Billboard)	43

== See also ==
- List of Billboard Tropical Airplay number ones of 1999
