= El Niágara en Bicicleta =

Single by Juan Luis Guerra & 4–40

from the album Ni Es lo Mismo Ni Es Igual
- Released: 1999
- Genre: Merengue rap
- Length: 4:28
- Label: Karen
- Songwriter: Juan Luis Guerra
- Producer: Juan Luis Guerra

Juan Luis Guerra & 4–40 singles chronology
"Palomita Blanca" (1999)	"El Niágara en Bicicleta" (1999)	"La Hormiguita" (1999)

Music video
- "El Niágara en Bicicleta" on YouTube

"El Niágara en Bicicleta" (transl. "Niagara Falls on a Bicycle") is a song by Dominican Republic singer-songwriter Juan Luis Guerra and his band 4-40 from his eighth studio album, Ni Es lo Mismo Ni Es Igual (1998). The song was written and produced by Guerra. It was released as the third single from the album in 1999 by Karen Records. A merengue rap song, it sees the protagonist finding himself in a hospital that is in poor condition, based on Guerra's experience in one. The song received positive reactions from three music critics, who praised its music and socially conscious lyrics.

The song led to Guerra receiving several accolades including the Latin Grammy Award for Best Tropical Song and a nomination for Song of the Year in 2000. Commercially, "El Niágara en Bicicleta" peaked at number two on the Billboard Hot Latin Songs and Tropical Airplay charts in the United States. It was also the best-performing tropical song of 1999 in the country. The accompanying music video was directed by J.C. Barros and follows the same story as the lyrics. Orishas performed a live cover of the song as part of the Latin Recording Academy's tribute to Guerra in 2007.

== Background and composition ==
Juan Luis Guerra "El Niágara en Bicicleta" (1998)
24-second sample from Juan Luis Guerra's "El Niágara en Bicicleta". It features a portion of Guerra rapping in the opening and transitions to the chorus, where he sings, "Don't tell me that the physicians have left"/"Don't tell me you don't have anesthesia".

In 1994, Guerra released his seventh studio album Fogaraté, a record consisting of soukous-influenced merengue and merengue típico. Following its release, he took a three year hiatus from recording, citing the need to take a break. "If artists lack something, it is peace. I needed to rest to find it and I found it in the figure of Jesus Christ. I called him through prayer and received his answer", Guerra stated. During the singer's hiatus, Guerra launched his own business as a director in the Dominican Republic for Mango TV and Viva FM station. On 29 October 1997, an editor for La Opinión reported that the artist had started working on a new album in Miami and he said: "I'm making a decent album, that people like. I know the wait has been a bit long, but I'm almost sure that when the public has my new production in their hands, they will better understand why I've lasted that long without recording." In February the following year, Guerra gave an update on the progress, stating the disc would have 10 to 12 tracks including merengues, bachata, ballads and a salsa, revealing it would be released later in 1998.

However in June 1998, Guerra was not satisfied with the material he recorded and decided to further record. Five months later, Bienvenido Rodríguez, president of Guerra's label Karen Records, revealed that the singer had wrapped up the album's production and that it would still contain the genres he announced. The record's name, Ni Es Lo Mismo, Ni Es Igual, was announced on 14 November 1998, and released on 15 December of the same year. Guerra wrote and produced all the tracks in the album including "El Niágara en Bicicleta". The song's title refers to a Dominican Republic idiom meaning "one is suffering economic misery". In the lyrics, the protagonist finds himself in an emergency room after suffering from a stroke only to "confront the tragicomic miseries of health care in the island". In her book, Merengue and Dominican Identity: Music as National Unifier (2004), Julie A. Sellers explains that "the singer-protagonist describes a literal attempt to cross Niagara Falls on a bike and the pitiful public health conditions that await him in a Dominican hospital afterwards". The narrator is in disbelief about the lack of medical supplies and the nurse cannot perform an electrocardiogram due to common blackouts. In the song, Guerra sings, "Don't tell me that the physicians have left, don't tell me you don't have anesthesia". Musically, the track is a merengue rap song. Guerra was inspired to write the song after a visit to a hospital following a high bilirubin diagnosis, and recalled "I told the doctor when I was getting out of there that I was going to write a song about my experience. After that, I wrote 'Niagara en Bicicleta'."

== Promotion and reception ==
"El Niágara en Bicicleta" was released as the album's third single in 1999 by Karen Records. A live version of the track was included on his albums A Son de Guerra Tour (2013) and Entre Mar y Palmeras (2022), respectively. As part of The Latin Recording Academy tribute to Guerra, who was presented with the Person of the Year accolade in 2007, Cuban hip hop group Orishas performed a live cover version of "El Niágara en Bicicleta". The music video for the song was directed by J.C. Barros and filmed at a hospital in Santo Domingo, Dominican Republic. In the video, like the song, the protagonist is taken to a hospital after suffering from a stroke and deals with the poor conditions of the place. AllMusic critic Evan C. Gutierrez found "El Niágara en Bicicleta" to be "irresistibly singable". Jacob Edgar of The Beat magazine regarded the track, along with "Vale la Pena", as "pristine pop music that is radio-friendly without insulting the listener's intelligence". The Miami Herald's reviewer called the former the album's highlight and stated that the lyrics "shows Guerra at his best: as a devastating social critic with a painterly eye for detail and a gentle touch".

At the inaugural Latin Grammy Awards in 2000, "El Niágara en Bicicleta" won Best Tropical Song and was nominated in the category of the Song of the Year, which went to "Dímelo" by Marc Anthony. In the same year, the track won Tropical/Salsa Track of the Year at the 7th Annual Billboard Latin Music Awards. The record was also awarded "Best Merengue Song" at the 1999 Premios Globos. At the 12th Annual Lo Nuestro Awards in 2000, the single was nominated in the category of Tropical Song of the Year, but ultimately lost to "Píntame" (1999) by Elvis Crespo. It was acknowledged as an award-winning song at the 2001 BMI Latin Awards. Commercially, "El Niágara en Bicicleta" peaked at number two on the Billboard Hot Latin Songs and Tropical Airplay charts in the United States. Despite not reaching number one, it ended 1999 as the best-performing tropical song of the year in the country.

== Formats and track listings ==
Promotional single

1. El Niágara En Bicicleta – 4:28
2. El Niágara En Bicicleta – 4:25
3. El Niágara En Bicicleta – 3:59

Remixes

1. El Niágara En Bicicleta (Latin Mix) – 4:26
2. El Niágara En Bicicleta (House Mix) – 5:00
3. El Niágara En Bicicleta (Dance Mix) – 7:02
4. Mi PC (Dance Mix) – 3:36

== Charts ==
=== Weekly charts ===
Weekly chart positions for "El Niágara en Bicicleta"
Chart (1999)	Peak position
US Hot Latin Songs (Billboard)	2
US Tropical Airplay (Billboard)	2

=== Year-end charts ===
1999 year-end chart performance for "El Niágara en Bicicleta"
Chart (1999)	Position
US Hot Latin Songs (Billboard)	11
US Tropical Airplay (Billboard)	1
