= List of number-one Billboard Hot Latin Tracks of 1999 =

This is a list containing the Billboard Hot Latin Tracks number-ones of 1999.

Issue date	Song	Artist(s)	Ref.
January 2	"Dejaría Todo"	Chayanne	
January 9	"Dejaría Todo"	Chayanne	
January 16	"Mi PC"	Juan Luis Guerra	
January 23	"Dejaría Todo"	Chayanne	
January 30	"Ese"	Jerry Rivera	
February 6	"Ese"	Jerry Rivera	
February 13	"Ese"	Jerry Rivera	
February 20	"Tú"	Shakira	
February 27	"Ese"	Jerry Rivera	
March 6	"Nunca Te Olvidaré"	Enrique Iglesias	
March 13	"Si Te Pudiera Mentir"	Marco Antonio Solís	
March 20	"Palomita Blanca"	Juan Luis Guerra	
March 27	"No Puedo Olvidar"	MDO	
April 3	"Palomita Blanca"	Juan Luis Guerra	
April 10	"Si Te Pudiera Mentir"	Marco Antonio Solís	
April 17	"Si Te Pudiera Mentir"	Marco Antonio Solís	
April 24	"Livin' La Vida Loca"	Ricky Martin	
May 1	"Livin' La Vida Loca"	Ricky Martin	
May 8	"Livin' La Vida Loca"	Ricky Martin	
May 15	"Livin' La Vida Loca"	Ricky Martin	
May 22	"Livin' La Vida Loca"	Ricky Martin	
May 29	"Livin' La Vida Loca"	Ricky Martin	
June 5	"Livin' La Vida Loca"	Ricky Martin	
June 12	"Livin' La Vida Loca"	Ricky Martin	
June 19	"Livin' La Vida Loca"	Ricky Martin	
June 26	"No Me Ames"	Jennifer Lopez with Marc Anthony	
July 3	"No Me Ames"	Jennifer Lopez with Marc Anthony	
July 10	"Bailamos"	Enrique Iglesias	
July 17	"No Me Ames"	Jennifer Lopez with Marc Anthony	
July 24	"No Me Ames"	Jennifer Lopez with Marc Anthony	
July 31	"No Me Ames"	Jennifer Lopez with Marc Anthony	
August 7	"No Me Ames"	Jennifer Lopez with Marc Anthony	
August 14	"No Me Ames"	Jennifer Lopez with Marc Anthony	
August 21	"Loco"	Alejandro Fernández	
August 28	"De Hoy en Adelante"	Millie	
September 4	"Bella"	Ricky Martin	
September 11	"Bella"	Ricky Martin	
September 18	"Bella"	Ricky Martin	
September 25	"De Hoy En Adelante"	Millie	
October 2	"Dímelo"	Marc Anthony	
October 9	"Dímelo"	Marc Anthony	
October 16	"Dímelo"	Marc Anthony	
October 23	"Dímelo"	Marc Anthony	
October 30	"Dímelo"	Marc Anthony	
November 6	"O Tú o Ninguna"	Luis Miguel	
November 13	"Llegar a Ti"	Jaci Velásquez	
November 20	"Llegar a Ti"	Jaci Velásquez	
November 27	"Llegar a Ti"	Jaci Velásquez	
December 4	"Escúchame"	Carlos Ponce	
December 11	"Ritmo Total"	Enrique Iglesias	
December 19	"Ritmo Total"	Enrique Iglesias	
December 25	"Ritmo Total"	Enrique Iglesias	

== See also ==
- Billboard Hot Latin Tracks
