= Vengo Naciendo =

Greatest hits album by Pablo Milanés
- Released: 1998
- Genre: Nueva canción, latin pop, trova
- Label: Universal Music Latino

Pablo Milanés chronology
Con Lilia Vera (1998)	Vengo Naciendo (1998)	Los Días de Gloria (2000)

Singles from Vengo Naciendo
- 1. "Fuego en la Piel" Released: 1999

Vengo Naciendo (Being Born) is a greatest hits album released by Cuban singer-songwriter Pablo Milanés on 1998. The album earned Milanés a Latin Grammy Award nomination for Best Pop Vocal Album. The album features singles, three re-recorded songs and three new songs "El Amor de Mi Vida", "Vengo Naciendo" and "Fuego en la Piel".

== Track listing ==
This information adapted from Allmusic.

All lyrics are written by Pablo Milanés.

No.	Title	Originally released on	Length
1.	"El Amor de Mi Vida"	New song	4:37
2.	"Mírame Bien"	Yo Me Quedo (1982)	3:56
3.	"A Mi Lado"	Despertar (1997)	4:53
4.	"Vengo Naciendo"	New song	1:55
5.	"Amor"	Aniversario (1979)	2:39
6.	"La Felicidad"	Proposiciones (1988)	5:05
7.	"Cada Vuelta Que Se Logra"	Canto de la Abuela (1991)	4:18
8.	"Yolanda"	Yo Me Quedo, re-recorded	4:47
9.	"El Primer Amor"	Proposiciones	4:27
10.	"La Novia Que Nunca Tuve"	Identidad (1990), re-recorded	4:16
11.	"Yo No Te Pido"	No Me Pidas (1978)	2:50
12.	"Para Vivir"	La Vida No Vale Nada (1976), re-recorded	3:41
13.	"Fuego en la Piel"	New song	3:22
14.	"El Amor de Mi Vida (Television Version)"		3:01

== Personnel ==
- Composer, Primary Artist - Pablo Milanés
- Composer - Víctor Manuel

== Certification ==
Region	Certification	Certified units/sales
Mexico (AMPROFON)	Gold	75,000^{^}
^{^} Shipments figures based on certification alone.
