= Por Una Mujer Bonita =

Studio album by Pepe Aguilar
- Released: October 19, 1999
- Genre: Mariachi
- Label: Musart
- Producer: Pepe Aguilar, Carlos Ceballos

Pepe Aguilar chronology
Por el Amor de Siempre (2000)	Por Una Mujer Bonita (1999)	Con Tambora (2001)

Por Una Mujer Bonita (For a Pretty Woman) is title of the studio album released by Mexican-American performer Pepe Aguilar. It was released in October 19, 1999, by Musart Records. Aguilar was awarded the Best Mexican-American/Tejano Music Performance at the 43rd Grammy Awards.

== Track listing ==
No.	Title	Writer(s)	Length
1.	"Perdóname"	Fato	3:32
2.	"Tenías Razón"	Alazán	3:51
3.	"De Qué Te Quejas Mujer"	Manuel Durán	3:37
4.	"Corazón Estéril"	Fato	3:37
5.	"Ya Vete"	Manuel Eduardo Castro	3:23
6.	"Ya Para Qué"	Fato	4:38
7.	"Por Una Mujer Bonita"	Manuel Monterrosas	2:45
8.	"El Zacatecano"	Castro	2:29
9.	"Esa Mujer"	Jesús Monárrez	3:56
10.	"El Río Se Secó"	Fato	3:16

== Chart performance ==
Chart (1999–2000)	Peak position
US Billboard Top Latin Albums	17
US Billboard Regional Mexican Albums	2
US Billboard Independent Albums	45

== Sales and certifications ==
Region	Certification	Certified units/sales
United States (RIAA)	2× Platinum (Latin)	200,000^{^}
^{^} Shipments figures based on certification alone.
