= Director of network programming =

Position in television

In radio or television broadcasting, a director of network programming, program director, director of programming, president of TV entertainment, senior vice president for TV programming or vice president of program scheduling is an executive who typically plans the broadcast programming schedule, deciding what radio programs or TV shows will air and when.

A program director's selections are based upon expertise in the media as well as knowledge of the target demographic. In some countries, the program director in commercial broadcasting is of even greater importance, since he makes a decisive decision about the economic success of the broadcasters. In so-called "private television", the most important program directors were or are often the managing directors of the station, such as Les Moonves for CBS in the United States or Anke Schäferkordt for RTL in Germany.

In a broadcasting network, there might be a separation between the news department and the programming department, in which case there is a news director overseeing the news department, and the director of programming has no say.

== See also ==
- Dayparting
- Full-service radio
