= Píntame =

Studio album by Elvis Crespo
- Released: May 4, 1999
- Studios: AQ-30 Studio de Ricardo Marty, Bayamon, Puerto Rico
- Genre: Merengue
- Language: Spanish
- Label: Sony Discos

Elvis Crespo chronology
Suavemente (1998)	Píntame (1999)	The Remixes (1999)

Singles from Píntame
- 1. "Píntame" Released: April 5, 1999; 2. "Por el Caminito" Released: October 18, 1999; 3. "Tiemblo" Released: February 14, 2000

Professional ratings
Review scores
Source	Rating
Orlando Sentinel	4/5 stars

Píntame (Paint Me) is the second studio album by Elvis Crespo. This album received the Grammy Award for Best Merengue Album and a Premio Lo Nuestro award for "Tropical Album of the Year". This is also the theme for the 1999 Venezuelan telenovela Carita Pintada.

== Track listing ==
1. "Píntame" (Elvis Crespo)
2. "Besos de Coral" (Rodolfo Barreras)
3. "Ven" (Luis Ángel Cruz)
4. "Solo Me Miro" (Luis Ángel Cruz)
5. "Si Tú Te Alejas" (Juan Castro)
6. "Dame Carino" (Elvis Crespo)
7. "Enamorado de Ti" (Omar Alfanno)
8. "Por el Caminito" (Juan Castro)
9. "No Comprendo" (Juancho Roig)
10. "Vuelve Conmigo" (Elvis Crespo)
11. "Eres Tú" (Luis Ángel Cruz)
12. "Tiemblo" (Elvis Crespo)
13. "Más que una Caricia" (Alejandro Jaen)
14. "Pequeño Luis" (Elvis Crespo)

== Charts ==
Chart (1999)	Peak position
Spain (PROMUSICAE)	30
U.S. Billboard 200	22
U.S. Billboard Top Latin Albums	1
U.S. Billboard Tropical Albums	1

== Sales and certifications ==
Region	Certification	Certified units/sales
Argentina (CAPIF)	Platinum	60,000^{^}
Mexico (AMPROFON)	Gold	75,000^{^}
Spain (Promusicae)	Platinum	300,000
United States (RIAA)	Gold	500,000^{^}
Uruguay (CUD)	Gold	3,000^{^}
^{^} Shipments figures based on certification alone.

== See also ==
- List of number-one Billboard Top Latin Albums of 1999
- List of number-one Billboard Tropical Albums from the 1990s
