= Expresión =

Studio album by Gilberto Santa Rosa
- Released: July 6, 1999
- Genre: Salsa; baladas
- Length: 55:10
- Language: Spanish
- Label: Sony Discos
- Producer: Gilberto Santa Rosa; José Lugo

Gilberto Santa Rosa chronology
De Corazón (1997)	Expresión (1999)	Intenso (2001)

Singles from Expresión
- 1. "Dejate Querer" Released: July 1999; 2. "Que Alguien Me Diga" Released: November 1999; 3. "Si los Hombres Han Llegado a la Luna" Released: 2000; 4. "Almas Gemelas" Released: 2000

Professional ratings
Review scores
Source	Rating
Allmusic	4/5 stars

Expresión (Expression) is the twelfth studio album recorded by Puerto Rican salsa singer Gilberto Santa Rosa released on July 6, 1999. The album received a Latin Grammy nomination for Best Salsa Album.

== Track listing ==
This information adapted from Allmusic.

No.	Title	Writer(s)	Length
1.	"Déjate Querer"	Donato Póveda	4:41
2.	"Que Alguien Me Diga"	Omar Alfanno	4:50
3.	"Si los Hombres Han Llegado a la Luna"	Rafa Almarcha	4:55
4.	"Mis Ojos Lloran"	Miguel Diaz	4:12
5.	"Ni Te Llamo Ni Te Busco (Motivo de Ser)"	Gilberto Santa Rosa	4:22
6.	"No la He Vuelto a Ver"	Rafy Monclova	4:21
7.	"Fulana"	Miguel Diaz	4:16
8.	"A la Distancia de Un Te Quiero"	Yoel Henríquez	4:26
9.	"Almas Gemelas"	Jorge Luis Piloto	4:35
10.	"Si No Me Ven Llorando"	Ramon Rodriguez	4:00
11.	"Pa' Quererse No Hay Que Verse"	Marisela Verena	4:43
12.	"Fulana (Remix)"	Miguel Diaz	5:13

== Personnel ==
- Trombone - Antonio Vazquez
- Arranger, Bass - Bobby Valentín
- Engineer - Brenda Ferry
- Tres - Charlie Rodriguez
- Clothing/Wardrobe, Coordination, Wardrobe - Cynthia Rodríguez
- Composer - Donato Póveda
- Photography - Eduardo Pérez
- Arranger - Ernesto Sanchez
- Composer, Primary Artist, Producer, Repertoire, Vocals - Gilberto Santa Rosa
- Percussion, Background Vocals - Hecor Perez
- Arranger - Jeremy Lubbock
- Coros, Horn, Background Vocals - Jerry Rivas
- Congas - Jimmy Morales
- Engineer - John Kurlander
- Guitar - Jorge Laboy
- Composer - Jorge Luís Piloto
- Coros, Background Vocals - Josué Rosado
- Trumpet - José "Jochy" Rodríguez
- Electric Bass - José Gazmey
- Arranger, Keyboards, Piano, Producer - José Lugo
- Contractor - Jules Chaikin
- Arranger - Lenny Prieto
- Coros, Horn, Background Vocals - Lissette Gregory
- Timbales - Luis R. Lugo
- Mixing - Luis Ruiz
- Composer - Marisela Verena
- Adjustments - Martha Medina
- Trombone - Moisés Nogueras
- Composer - Omar Alfanno
- Assistant - Pedro Rivera
- Horn, Timbales - Pichie Perez
- Composer - Rafa Almarcha
- Bongos - Rafael "Tito" Echevarria
- Coros, Horn, Background Vocals - Rafael de Jesus
- Trombone - Raffi Torres
- Composer - Ramón Rodríguez
- Bongos - Raúl Rodríguez
- Bongos - Raúl Travieso Rodríguez
- Coros, Horn - Rei Pena
- Background Vocals - Rey Pena
- Transcription - Sammy Gonzalez
- Arranger, Trumpet - Tommy Villarini
- Trombone - Toñito Vázquez
- Congas - William Thompson
- Composer - Yoel Henríquez
- Trumpet - Ángel "Angie" Machado
- Alto Saxophone, Baritone Saxophone, Soprano Saxophone, Tenor Saxophone, Saxophone - Ángel Torres

== Chart performance ==
Chart (1999–2000)	Peak position
U.S. Billboard Top Latin Albums	2
U.S. Billboard Tropical Albums	2
U.S. Billboard Heatseekers Albums	11

== Certification ==
Region	Certification	Certified units/sales
United States (RIAA)	2× Platinum (Latin)	200,000^{^}
^{^} Shipments figures based on certification alone.
