= 2000 in Latin music =

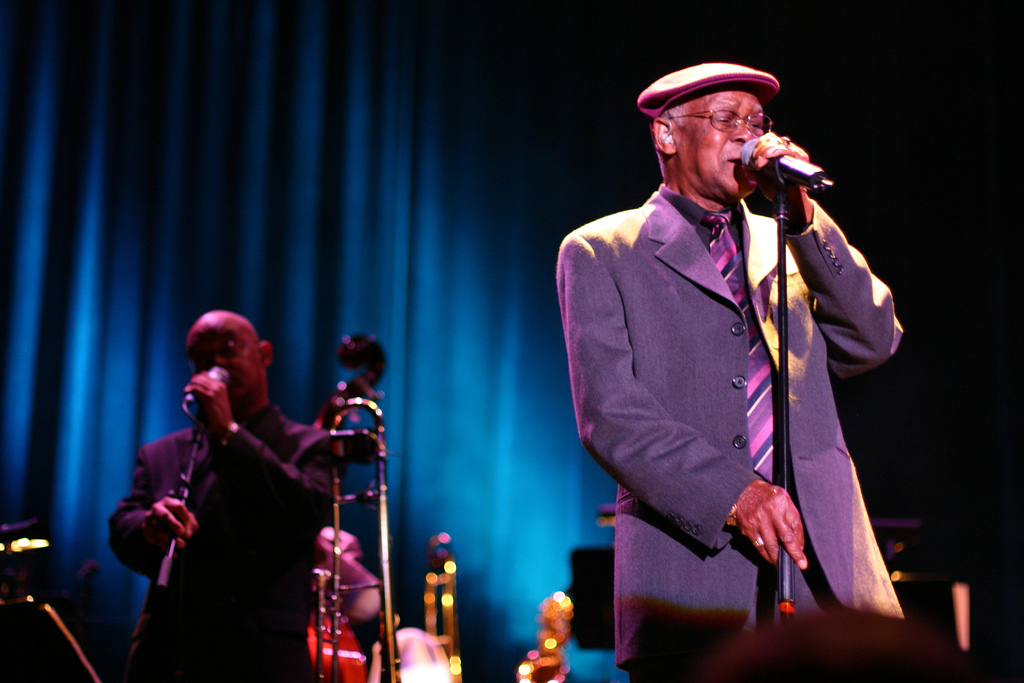
At the age of 72, Cuban singer Ibrahim Ferrer received a Latin Grammy for Best New Artist.

This is a list of notable events in Latin music (i.e., music from the Spanish- and Portuguese-speaking areas Latin America, Latin Europe, and the United States) that took place in 2000.

== Events ==
- January 25 – The Recording Industry Association of America (RIAA) announces the creation of the "Los Premios de Oro y Platino" ("The Gold and Platinum Awards" in Spanish) for Latin albums (defined by the RIAA as a release with 51% or more in Spanish). Initially the thresholds for awards are 100,000 units for Disco de Oro, 200,000 units for Disc de Platino, and 400,000 or more for Multi-platino.
- September 13 – The inaugural Latin Grammy Awards are held at the Staples Center in Los Angeles, California:
  - "Corazón Espinado" by Santana featuring Maná wins the Latin Grammy Award for Record of the Year
  - Amarte Es un Placer by Luis Miguel wins the Latin Grammy Award for Album of the Year
  - "Dímelo" by Marc Anthony wins the Latin Grammy Award for Song of the Year
  - Ibrahim Ferrer wins the Latin Grammy Award for Best New Artist.
  - Cuban-American songwriter and producer Emilio Estefan is honored as the Person of the Year

== Number-one albums and singles by country ==
- List of number-one albums of 2000 (Spain)
- List of number-one singles of 2000 (Spain)
- List of number-one Billboard Top Latin Albums of 2000
- List of number-one Billboard Hot Latin Tracks of 2000

== Awards ==
- 2000 Latin Grammy Awards
- 2000 Premio Lo Nuestro
- 2000 Billboard Latin Music Awards
- 2000 Tejano Music Awards

== Albums released ==
=== First quarter ===
==== January ====
Day	Title	Artist	Genre(s)	Singles	Label
24	Morir de Amor	Conjunto Primavera			Fonovisa Records
24	Querencia	Mayte Martín	Flamenco		Virgin
25	Por el Pasado	Grupo Bryndis	Cumbia, Ballad		Disa
25	Corazón Duro	Alex Bueno	Bachata		J&N Records

==== February ====
Day	Title	Artist	Genre(s)	Singles	Label
1	Son by Four	Son by Four	Salsa, Ballad, Merengue, Hip-House		Sony Discos
1	Ciego de Amor	Charlie Zaa	Ballad		Sonolux, Sony Discos
1	Abre	Fito Páez	Pop rock	"Abre"	Warner Music Colombia
8	Celia Cruz and Friends: A Night of Salsa	Celia Cruz	Salsa, Afro-Cuban	"Mi Vida Es Cantar" "Azucar Negra" "Guantanamera"	RMM Records
8	A Mis Niños de 30 Años	Miliki	Vocal		Ariola
8	Homenaje a Ramon Ayala: 25 Aniversario	Julio Preciado			RCA, BMG U.S. Latin
8	Que Voy a Hacer Sin Ti	Pablo Montero	Bolero, Ranchera		BMG U.S. Latin, Ariola
15	La Extraordinaria Paradoja del Sonido Quijano	Café Quijano			WEA
15	Los Caballeros de la Noche	Los Acosta		"Como un Pajarillo" "A Escondidas"	EMI Latin, Disa
15	Viva la Musica	Gipsyland	Batucada, Hip-House, Samba		Hollywood Records
21	Uno	La Ley	Pop rock		WEA Latina, Inc.
29	MTV Unplugged	Shakira	Pop rock	"Si Te Vas" "Ojos Asi"	Sony Discos
29	En la Madrugada Se Fue	Los Temerarios			FonoVisa
29	El Original	Los Originales de San Juan			

==== March ====
Day	Title	Artist	Genre(s)	Singles	Label
20	Siempre Habra una Mujer	Los Rehenes			Fonovisa, Disa
21	Lobo Herido	Vicente Fernández	Ranchera, Mariachi	"Borracho Te Recuerdo"	Sony Discos
24	Guerra de Estados Pesados	Various artists			
27	El Nuevo Charro de Mexico	Ezequiel Peña			
28	Cuba Linda	Cachao	Latin Jazz, Mambo, Afro-Cuban Jazz, Guajira		EMI Latin, CineSon
28	Sabe a Limi-T	Limi-T 21			EMI Latin
28	Zona de Peligro	Bobby Pulido	Tejano		EMI Latin

=== Second quarter ===
==== April ====
Day	Title	Artist	Genre(s)	Singles	Label
4	Eternamente	Ana Gabriel	Ballad, Vocal		Sony Discos
4	Caricias	Rocío Dúrcal	Vocal, Ballad		BMG U.S. Latin, Ariola
4	Libertango: The Music of Ástor Piazzolla	Gary Burton	Contemporary Jazz, Tango	"Escualo!" "Fuga y Misterio"	Concord Jazz
10	Alabanza	Montse Cortés	Flamenco		Columbia
11	Hablando del Amor	Tony Vega			RMM 2000
11	Live at the Village Vanguard	Chucho Valdés	Afro-Cuban Jazz		Blue Note
11	Con Su Loquera	Mala Fe	Merengue		JVN Musical Inc.
18	Voy a Enamorarte	Gisselle	Merengue, Rumba, Bolero, Ballad, Salsa	"Júrame" "Voy a Enamorarte"	BMG U.S. Latin, Ariola
18	...De Vuelta al Barrio	Chichí Peralta	Merengue, Bachata, Son		Caiman Records
18	Live at the Blue Note	Paquito D'Rivera Quintet	Latin Jazz		Half Note
18	Escorpion	Banda Maguey	Corrido, Cumbia, Bolero, Ranchera		BMG U.S. Latin, RCA
18	Yolandita En Vivo	Yolandita Monge			BMG U.S. Latin
22	Los Angeles Tambien Bailan	Grupo Mojado			Fonovisa
25	Entre Tus Brazos	Alejandro Fernández	Ballad, Vocal		Sony Discos, Sony Discos
25	Buena Vista Social Club Presents Omara Portuondo	Omara Portuondo	Afro-Cuban Jazz, Mambo, Bolero, Son	"La Sitiera" "Donde Estabas"	World Circuit, Nonesuch
25	Arrasando	Thalía	Latin, Synth-Pop, Euro House	"Entre el Mar y una Estrella" "Regresa a Mi" "Reencarnación" "Arrasando"	EMI Latin
25	Secreto de Amor	Joan Sebastian	Ranchera, Ballad	"Un Idiota"	Musart
25	Decimo Aniversario	Los Terribles del Norte			
25	¡Muy Divertido!	Marc Ribot	Afro-Cuban Jazz, Afro-Cuban		Atlantic
25	Fruta Prohibida	Sonora Tropicana			
25	Oh! Que Gusto	Grupo Atrapado			
25	Tanto Tempo	Bebel Gilberto	Bossa Nova, Samba	"Samba da Benção" "Tanto Tempo" "So Nice (Summer Samba)"	Six Degrees Records, Ziriguiboom, Crammed Discs
25	Poeta y Guerrero	Domingo Quiñones	Salsa, Bolero		RMM Records

==== May ====
Day	Title	Artist	Genre(s)	Singles	Label
1	Alma Caribeña	Gloria Estefan	Salsa, Latin Pop	"Por Un Beso" "Como Me Duele Perderte" "Tres Gotas De Agua Bendita" "No Me Dejes De Querer"	Epic
2	Baño de Luna	Melina León	Merengue	"Cuando Una Mujer"	Sony Discos
2	En Sol Mayor	Joe Arroyo	Salsa, Cumbia		Sony Discos
2	Carlos Malta e Pife Muderno	Carlos Malta and Pife Muderno	Forró, Batucada		Rob Digital
2	Fenomenal	Rey Ruiz	Salsa		Bohemia Records
9	Son	Albita Rodríguez			
13	Afro-Cuban Dream... Live & in Clave!	Bobby Sanabria Big Band	Latin Jazz		Arabesque Recordings
15	A Invasão do Sagaz Homem Fumaça	Planet Hemp	Hardcore		Chaos, Chaos
16	El Rey del Rodeo	Emilio Navaira			RCA
16	Suíte Leopoldina	Guinga	MPB		Velas
16	Así Soy	Charlie Cruz			WEA Latina, WeaCaribe
16	Toromania	Los Toros Band	Merengue, Bachata		Universal Music Latino
16	Dónde Está la Vida	Francisco Céspedes	Ballad		WEA Latina
17	Brujerizmo	Brujeria	Death Metal		Roadrunner Records
23	Por Encima de Todo	Grupo Límite	Norteno, Tejano		Universal, Rodven
23	Paulina	Paulina Rubio	Latin Pop	"Lo Hare por Ti" "El Ultimo Adios" "Y Yo Sigo Aqui" "Yo No Soy Esa Mujer"	Universal, Polydor
23	Quemame los Ojos	Ramón Ayala	Conjunto, Tejano		Freddie Records, Sony Music Latin
23	Bacilos	Bacilos		"Tabaco y Chanel"	Wea Latina
23	No Dejes de Bailar	Caballo Dorado			Metro Casa Musical, S.A. De C.V.
23	Que Se Mueran los Feos	Los Tigrillos	Norteno, Tejano		Metro Casa Musical, S.A de C.V.
25	Quien Iba a Pensar	Jimmy Gonzalez	Tejano, Ranchera, Cumbia, Bolero		Freddie Records
25	Nação Nordestina	Zé Ramalho	MPB		BMG Brasil, Ariola
26	Acústico MTV	Capital Inicial	Rock		Abril Music
29	Los Corridos Mas Torones	Grupo Exterminador	Norteno, Corrido		Fonovisa
30	El Toro del Corrido	Lupillo Rivera	Norteno		Cintas Acuario
30	Los Reyes del Nuevo Milenio	Wisin & Yandel			
30	Mi Estrella	Jay Perez	Tejano		Sony Discos

==== June ====
Day	Title	Artist	Genre(s)	Singles	Label	
6	El Sapo	Azul		"Loco" "Sapo" "La Bomba"	Sony Discos	
13	Consentida	Antonio Aguilar				
13	Las Tardecitas de Miton's	Adrián Iaies	Tango		Acqua Records	
20	Noche de Cuatro Lunas	Julio Iglesias	Ballad, Chanson, Vocal		Columbia, Sony Discos	
20	Eterno	Luis Fonsi	Salsa, Soft Rock, Ballad	"Imaginame Sin Ti" "Eterno" "No Te Cambio Por Ninguna" "Mi Sueño"	Universal Music Latino	
20	Acuarela de Tambores	Alex Acuña	Salsa, Afro-Cuban		DCC Compact Classics	
20	Masterpiece/Obra Maestra	Tito Puente and Eddie Palmieri				
20	De Mis Manos	Raúl di Blasio	Easy Listening, Ballad		BMG U.S. Latin	
20	Fatal Fantassy	DJ Joe	Reggaeton		Geniux Music	
27	Siempre Cuenta Conmigo	Leonardo Gonzales				
27	Abrázame y Bésame	Jennifer y los Jetz		"Si Tu Te Vas" "Abrázame y Bésame" "Contigo Otra Vez"		EMI Latin, Q Productions

=== Third quarter ===
==== July ====
Day	Title	Artist	Genre(s)	Singles	Label
3	Los Paraísos Desiertos	Ismael Serrano	Acoustic, Soft Rock		Universal
11	La Vida Es	Nek	Pop rock, Euro House		WEA
18	Estos Si Son Corridos	Banda Arkángel R-15	Corrido		Luna Music, Sony Discos
18	Hombre Sintetizador	Zurdok	Alternative Rock	"Hombre Sintetizador I" "Si Quieres Llegar Muy Lejos"	Mercury, Universal, Discos Manicomio
18	Los Reyes del Nuevo Milenio	Wisin & Yandel			
18	Cd00	OV7	Ballad		Sony Discos
18	No Podemos Volar	El Tri			WEA Latina
18	Con Arena Nueva	Rikarena	Merengue, Bachata	"Cuando el Amor Se Daña" "El Parar Pan Pan"	J&N Records, Sony Discos
18	Para Siempre	Jerry Rivera	Salsa		Sony Discos
18	Mas Intenso Que Nunca	Grupo Intenso			
18	Sueños de Juventud	DKDA	Soundtrack		EMI Latin, Televisa

==== August ====
Day	Title	Artist	Genre(s)	Singles	Label
1	Serás Parte de Mi Mundo	Anthony	Merengue		J&N Records, Sony Discos
8	Melaza	David Sánchez	Contemporary Jazz	"Puerto San Juan" "Against Our Will"	Columbia
8	Lusofonia	Martinho da Vila	Samba, African	"Ô Morena, Como É Bom Viagar" "Nutridinha (Nutridinha Do Sal)" "Salve a Mulatada Brasileira"	Sony Discos
15	Rompiendo Noches	Tito Rojas	Salsa		Musical Productions, Sony Discos
15	Mi Guitarra y Yo	Banda Machos	Cumbia, Corrido, Ballad, Ranchera		Metro Casa Musical, S.A. De C.V.
22	Evolución	Luis Enrique	Salsa		Wea Latina, Inc.
22	Bueninvento	Julieta Venegas	Alternative Rock, Ranchera, Pop rock	"Hoy No Quiero" "Enero y Abril" "Bueninvento" "Sería Feliz" "Instantánea"	BMG U.S. Latin, Ariola
22	Mardi Gras Mambo: Cubanismo! in New Orleans	Cubanismo!	Afro-Cuban Jazz		Hannibal Records
29	Lo Grande de los Grandes	Pepe Aguilar	Ranchera	"Que Sepan Todos"	Musart
29	Galería Caribe	Ricardo Arjona	Acoustic, Soft Rock, Pop rock	"Lo Poco Que Queda de Mi" "Cuando" "Sólo Quería un Café"	Sony Discos, Sony Discos
29	Ya Lo Ves	UFF	Synth-Pop		Lideres

==== September ====
Day	Title	Artist	Genre(s)	Singles	Label
12	Mi Reflejo	Christina Aguilera	Latin, Ballad	"Genio Atrapado" "Mi Reflejo"	RCA, BMG U.S. Latin
12	Te Sone	El Coyote y su Banda Tierra Santa		"Te Soñé"	EMI Latin
12	Toma Ketama!	Ketama	Flamenco, Fusion		Mercury, Universal
12	Entre Tu y Mil Mares	Laura Pausini	Soul, Ballad	"Entre Tu y Mil Mares"	CGD East West
12	Yo no fui	Pedro Fernández	Ranchera, Ballad, Mariachi		Universal, Mercury
12	Arepa 3000: A Venezuelan Journey Into Space	Los Amigos Invisibles	Latin, Funk, Dance-Pop, Downtempo, Pop rock, Disco, Cumbia, Lounge, Easy Listening, Breaks, Leftfield, House	"La Vecina" "Qué Rico" "Masturbation Session"	Luaka Bop
12	Soul of the Conga	Poncho Sanchez	Latin Jazz	"Joseito" "Oyelo"	Concord Picante
12	Así Fue	Tito Nieves	Salsa		RMM Records
12	Unforgettable Boleros	Chucho Valdés	Bolero		Velas
12	Rabanes	Los Rabanes	Pop rock		Sony Discos
12	Como Este Loco	Julio Preciado			RCA
19	Motherland	Danilo Pérez	Contemporary Jazz, Latin Jazz, Afro-Cuban Jazz	"Suite for the Americas, Pt. 1" "Elegant Dance"	Verve Records
19	Chanchullo	Rubén González	Afro-Cuban Jazz, Son	"Chanchullo" "El Bodeguero"	Nonesuch
26	El Alma al Aire	Alejandro Sanz		"Cuando Nadie Me Ve" "Quisiera Ser" "El Alma al Aire"	WEA
26	Entre Pericos y Gallos	Los Razos de Sacramento			
26	Siempre Viviré	Celia Cruz	Salsa	"Oye Como Va" "Por Si Acaso No Regreso"	Sony Discos, Sony Discos

=== Fourth quarter ===
==== October ====
Day	Title	Artist	Genre(s)	Singles	Label
2	De Antologia	Leopoldo Federico and Orquesta			
3	A Lo Cubano	Orishas	Contemporary R&B, Pop Rap, Conscious	"A lo Cubano" "537 C.U.B.A."	Chrysalis
3	Vivo	Luis Miguel	Vocal, Ballad, Bolero, Bachata	"Tu Solo Tu" "Como Es Posible Que a Mi Lado"	WEA Latina
3	Simplemente	Chayanne	Salsa, Vocal, Ballad	"Yo Te Amo"	Sony Discos, Sony Discos
10	Oscar De La Hoya	Oscar De La Hoya		"Mi Amor" "Te Amo"	EMI Latin
10	Mas Libre	Plena Libre		"La Plena Bien Sabrosa" "María Luisa" "A Mi Manera"	Ryko Latino
10	Carambola	Chico O'Farrill	Latin Jazz	"Carambola" "Crazy City (... But I Love It)" "Oye Mi Rumba"	Milestone
10	Albeniz: Merlin	Carlos Álvarez, Plácido Domingo, Jane Henschel and Ana Maria Martinez	Romantic, Opera		Decca
10	On Time	Ilegales	Latin, Merengue, Dance-Pop, Hip-House, Salsa	"Una Copa de Licor" "Que Te Vaya Bien" "Sonandote"	BMG U.S. Latin, Ariola
16	Harmonia Do Samba (2000)	Harmonia do Samba	Axe, Samba		Abril Music
16	Bacalov: Misa Tango	Plácido Domingo and Ana Maria Martinez	Neo-Classical		Deutsche Grammophon
17	Fíjate Bien	Juanes	Latin Pop		Surco, Universal
17	Girados en Concierto	Ana Torroja and Miguel Bosé	Pop rock		WEA
17	Contigo	La Mafia			FonoVisa
17	Mejores Tiempos	Michael Salgado	Tejano		Discos Joey International
20	Sangre Caliente	Los Terribles del Norte			
24	La Caspa del Diablo	Los Originales de San Juan			
24	World Jazz	Lara & Reyes	Flamenco		Higher Octave Music
24	The Return of El Santo	King Changó	Ska		Luaka Bop
25	Calle 54	Various artists			
30	Estilo Libre	Eros Ramazzotti			
30	The Other Side	Hevia	World, Folk, Ethereal		Higher Octave World
30	Un Sueño	Los Ángeles de Charly	Cumbia		FonoVisa
30	En Vivo	Marco Antonio Solís			FonoVisa
31	Yo Soy Toño	Toño Rosario	Merengue		Wea Latina, Inc.
31	Te Quisé Olvidar	MDO		"Te Quisé Olvidar"	Epic

==== November ====
Day	Title	Artist	Genre(s)	Singles	Label
1	Los Genios Musicales	Trebol Clan	Reggaeton		Geniux Productions
7	Brujerizmo	Brujeria	Death Metal		Roadrunner Records
7	Twentieth Century Mexican Symphonic Music, Vol. 1	Eduardo Diazmuñoz and La Filarmonica de la Ciudad de Mexico			
7	Líricas	Zeca Baleiro	MPB		Universal Music, MZA Music
7	O Som do Sim	Herbert Vianna	Acoustic		EMI, EMI
7	Bossa Nova	Emílio Santiago	MPB, Bossa Nova		Epic
13	En Vivo... El Hombre y Su Musica	Ramón Ayala	Ranchera, Cumbia, Bolero		Harmony, Freddie Records, Sony Music Latin
13	Obsesion	Los Palominos	Tejano, Conjunto		FonoVisa
14	Tributo al Cuarteto Patria	Eliades Ochoa	Cuatro, Son, Guaracha, Bolero, Cubano		Higher Octave World
14	14 Corridos de Primera Plana	Los Tucanes de Tijuana			
14	Me Gusta Vivir de Noche	Los Tucanes de Tijuana	Norteno		Universal, Mercury
14	Lagrimas de Cera	El Lebrijano	Flamenco		EMI
14	20/20	David Lee Garza & Los Musicales	Tejano		Sony Discos
14	Jay Lozada	Jay Lozada	Salsa	"Por Amarte Así"	Universal Music Latin America
17	Bate O Pé ao Vivo	Rionegro & Solimões	Country		Mercury, Universal Music
20	Prieta Orgullosa	Los Rieleros Del Norte			Fonovisa
21	El viaje de Copperpot	La Oreja de Van Gogh	Ballad, Vocal, Pop rock	"Cuidate" "Soledad" "Paris" "La Playa"	Sony Discos, Sony Discos
21	Wow! Flash	Elvis Crespo	Merengue	"Wow! Flash" "Mi Sol, Mi Luna" "La Noche"	Sony Discos
21	Es Para Ti	Intocable	Norteno		EMI Latin
21	Unplugged	Monchy & Alexandra	Bachata		J&N Records
21	Con la Musica por Dentro	Tony Tun Tun		"Tu Me Provocas"	
21	Noches de Fantasia	Joseph Fonseca	Merengue	"Noches de Fantasia"	Karen Records
21	Romanticos por Siempre	Los Tri-O			Prisma Records
21	Colección Romantica	Juan Luis Guerra	Merengue	"Tú"	Karen Records
27	Aire	José Mercé	Flamenco		Virgin
27	Nomadas	Los Acosta	Conjunto, Cumbia		FonoVisa
28	México Barroco/Puebla VIII – Maitines para Nuestra Señora de Guadalupe/Manuel Arenzana	Benjamin Echenique	Choral		Urtext Digital Classics

==== December ====
Day	Title	Artist	Genre(s)	Singles	Label
1	Ao Vivo – A Majestade o Sabiá	Roberta Miranda	MPB		Mercury, Universal Music
1	Acústico	Bruno & Marrone			Abril Music
5	Doble Play	Oscar D'León	Salsa		Universal, Rodven
5	Noites do Norte	Caetano Veloso	Bossanova, MPB		EmArcy
5	Las Flores de la Vida	Compay Segundo	Cubano, Son		Nonesuch
12	Abrázame Muy Fuerte	Juan Gabriel	Ballad	"Abrázame Muy Fuerte"	BMG U.S. Latin, Ariola
12	Me Enamore	Eddy Herrera	Merengue, Bachata	"Pegame Tu Vicio"	J&N Records
12	Beat Beleza	Ivete Sangalo	Axe, Samba, MPB		Universal Music, Mercury
12	Enquanto o Mundo Gira	Cidade Negra	Dub, Reggae		Sony Music
12	Agua da Minha Sede	Zeca Pagodinho	Samba		Universal Music
12	Casa de Samba, Vol. 4	Various artists			
19	La Formula	Issac Delgado	Timba, Salsa		Ahi-Nama Music

=== Unknown ===
Title	Artist	Genre(s)	Singles	Label
Ritmo sustancia	Mala Fama	Cumbia villera		DBN
Morir de Amor	Conjunto Primavera	Norteno		Fonovisa, Inc.
Siempre Habra una Mujer	Los Rehenes			Fonovisa, Disa
El Nuevo Charro de Mexico	Ezequiel Peña			
Los Angeles Tambien Bailan	Grupo Mojado			Fonovisa
A Invasão do Sagaz Homem Fumaça	Planet Hemp	Hardcore		Chaos, Chaos
Nação Nordestina	Zé Ramalho	MPB		BMG Brasil, Ariola
Los Corridos Mas Torones	Exterminador	Norteno, Corrido		Fonovisa
Voz no Ouvido	Pedro Mariano	MPB		Trama
Semente Caipira	Pena Branca & Xavantinho	Caipira, Sertanejo		Kuarup Discos
Puro Prazer	Zizi Possi	MPB		Universal Music, Mercury
3001	Rita Lee			Mercury, Universal Music
En Que Trabaja el Muchacho	Los Huracanes del Norte	Norteno, Corrido, Ranchera		FonoVisa
Mayo Longo	Carlos Núñez	Folk		Ariola, BMG Espana
Plaza De Toros Mexico	Banda el Recodo			FonoVisa
De Paisano a Paisano	Los Tigres del Norte	Ballad, Bolero, Conjunto, Corrido, Cumbia, Norteño, Ranchera		FonoVisa
The Latin Album	Keith Lockhart conducting The Boston Pops Orchestra			
En Vivo: Puero Party Live, Vol. 2	Jaime & Los Chamascos			
¿Qué Es Música Tejana?	The Legends			
El Amor Nos Mantendra Juntos	Priscila y sus Balas de Plata	Tejano, Cumbia		FonoVisa
Si Quieres Saber Quién Soy	Alejandro Lerner			Universal
Marta & Marilia	Ella Baila Sola	Folk Rock, Pop rock, Ballad		EMI Latin
Pianoforte	Andrés Alén			
Un Paso a la Eternidad	Sindicato Argentino del Hip Hop	Hip Hop		Universal Music Latino
Crazy Atorrante	DJ Kun	Pop Rap		Gasa
Como É Triste de Olhar	Faces do Subúrbio	Conscious, Favela Funk		MZA Music
La Mami Internacional Presenta: 7 Notas 7 Colores	7 Notas 7 Colores			
Homenaje a Fernando Z. Maldonado	Myrza			
Por una Mujer Bonita	Banda Limonense			
Un Millón de Lágrimas	Guardianes del Amor			FonoVisa
Memórias, Crônicas, e Declarações de Amor	Marisa Monte	MPB, Samba		Metro Blue
Nadando com os Tubarões	Charlie Brown Jr.	Pop rock		Virgin, Virgin
Pagode de Mesa 2 – Ao Vivo	Beth Carvalho	Samba		Indie Records
Ao Vivo	Dominguinhos	Forró, MPB		Polydisk
Niños Adorando	Niños Adorando			
Toussaint: Gauguin	Alberto Cruzprieto, Mercedes Gomez, Roberto Kolb and Jaime Marquez			
Desnudo	Marcos Llunas			AJ Records, Inc.
Golpeando Fuerte	Noelia			FonoVisa
Con Sabor a Mexico	Las Jilguerillas			
Para los pibes	Damas Gratis	Cumbia		DBN
Marimba Magia	Papá Roncón	Marimba		Banana Pirate Records
Hembra	Libido	Alternative Rock, Arena Rock, Pop rock		Columbia

== Best-selling records ==
=== Best-selling albums ===
The following is a list of the top 10 best-selling Latin albums in the United States in 2000, according to Billboard.

Rank	Album	Artist
1	Desde un Principio: From the Beginning	Marc Anthony
2	Son by Four	Son by Four
3	Alma Caribeña ~ Caribbean Soul	Gloria Estefan
4	El Amor de Mi Tierra	Carlos Vives
5	Mi Reflejo	Christina Aguilera
6	Amor, Familia y Respeto	A.B. Quintanilla and Los Kumbia Kings
7	MTV Unplugged	Shakira
8	The Best Hits	Enrique Iglesias
9	Buena Vista Social Club Presents Ibrahim Ferrer	Ibrahim Ferrer
10	Dónde Están los Ladrones?	Shakira

=== Best-performing songs ===
The following is a list of the top 10 best-performing Latin songs in the United States in 2000, according to Billboard.

Rank	Single	Artist
1	"A Puro Dolor"	Son by Four
2	"Que Alguien Me Diga"	Gilberto Santa Rosa
3	"Fruta Fresca"	Carlos Vives
4	"Secreto de Amor"	Joan Sebastian
5	"El Listón de Tu Pelo"	Los Ángeles Azules
6	"Muy Dentro de Mí"	Marc Anthony
7	"Te Hicé Mal"	Los Temerarios
8	"Dímelo"	Marc Anthony
9	"Yo Sé Que Te Acordarás"	Banda el Recodo
10	"Desnuda"	Ricardo Arjona

== Births ==
- January 27 – Blessd, Colombian reggaeton singer
- February 12 – María Becerra, Argentine reggaeton singer
- April 12 – Manuel Turizo, Colombian reggaeton singer
- April 13 – Khea, Argentine trap rapper
- August 25 – Nicki Nicole, Argentine rapper
- October 4 – Lunay, Puerto Rican reggaeton singer

== Deaths ==
- May 24 – Rodrigo, 27, Argentine singer of cuarteto music
- May 31 – Tito Puente, 77, American timbales musician, songwriter, record producer, and performer of mambo and Latin jazz music
- July 23 – Carmen Santonja, Spanish pop singer (Vainica Doble)
- October 6 – Cuco Sánchez, 79, Mexican singer and songwriter ("Fallaste Corazón", "Siempre Hace Frío")
- October 15 – Leo Marini, Argentine bolero singer
- November 19 – Mike Laure, Mexican singer of boleros and cumbia music
- December 12 – Libertad Lamarque, 92, Argentine actress and singer
