= 2001 Latin Billboard Music Awards =

8th annual Billboard Latin Music Awards

2001 Billboard Latin Music Awards
- Date: April 26, 2001
- Venue: Jackie Gleason Theater, Miami Beach, Florida

The 8th annual Billboard Latin Music Awards which honor the most popular albums, songs, and performers in Latin music took place in Miami.

== Pop Album of the Year, Male ==
- Luis Miguel — Vivo
- Chayanne — Simplemente
- Oscar De La Hoya — Oscar De La Hoya
- Alejandro Fernández — Entre tus brazos

== Pop album of the year, female ==
- Mi Reflejo — Christina Aguilera
- Paulina — Paulina Rubio
- MTV Unplugged — Shakira
- Arrasando — Thalía

== Pop album of the year, group ==
- Mi Gloria Eres Tu — Los Tri-O
- El Sapo Azul — Azul
- Subir Al Cielo — MDO
- CD 00 — OV7

== Pop album of the year, new artist ==
- Mi Reflejo — Christina Aguilera
- El Sapo Azul — Azul
- Oscar De La Hoya — Oscar De La Hoya
- CD 00 — OV7

== Latin Pop Track of the Year ==
- A Puro Dolor — Son by Four
- Muy Dentro de Mi — Marc Anthony
- Por Amarte Así — Cristian Castro
- Atado a Tu Amor — "Chayanne"

== Tropical/salsa album of the year, male ==
- El Amor de Mi Tierra — Carlos Vives
- Wow! Flash — Elvis Crespo
- Chanchullo — Rubén González
- Obra maestra — Tito Puente & Eddie Palmieri

== Tropical/salsa album of the year, female ==
- Alma Caribeña — Gloria Estefan
- Voy a Enamorarte — Gisselle
- Baño de Luna — Melina León
- Buena Vista Social Club Presents Omara Portuondo — Omara Portuondo

== Tropical/salsa album of the year, group ==
- Son by Four — Son by Four
- Distinto, Diferente — Afro-Cuban All Stars
- Masters of the Stage — Grupo Manía
- Sabe a Limi-T — Limi-T 21

== Tropical/salsa album of the year, new artist ==
- Son by Four — Son by Four
- Seras Parte De Mi Mundo — Anthony
- Con Su Loquera — Mala Fe
- Buena Vista Social Club Presents Omara Portuondo — Omara Portuondo

== Tropical/salsa track of the year ==
- A Puro Dolor — Son by Four
- Muy Dentro de Mi — Marc Anthony
- Jurame — Gisselle
- Que Alguien Me Diga — "Gilberto Santa Rosa"

== Regional Mexican album of the year, male ==
- Secreto De Amor — Joan Sebastian
- Lo Grande De Los Grandes — Pepe Aguilar
- Por Una Mujer Bonita — Pepe Aguilar
- Lobo Herido — Vicente Fernández

== Regional Mexican album of the year, male group ==
- En la Madrugada Se Fue — Los Temerarios
- Lo Mejor de Mi Vida — Banda el Recodo
- Morir de Amor — Conjunto Primavera
- De Paisano A Paisano — Los Tigres del Norte

== Regional Mexican album of the year, female group or female solo artist ==
- Por Encima De Todo — Grupo Límite
- Prenda Del Alma — Yesenia Flores
- Abrázame y Bésame — Jennifer
- El Amor Nos Mantendra Juntos — Priscila y Sus Balas de Plata

== Regional Mexican album of the year, new artist ==
- Abrázame y Bésame — Jennifer
- 100 Años de Mariachi — Placido Domingo

== Regional Mexican track of the year ==
- El Liston De Tu Pelo — Los Ángeles Azules
- Yo Se Que Te Acordaras — Banda el Recodo
- Morir de Amor — Conjunto Primavera
- Y Sigues Siendo tu — Rogelio Martínez

== Latin rock album of the year ==
- MTV Unplugged — Shakira
- Brujerizmo — Brujeria
- Uno — La Ley

== Hot Latin Track of the Year ==
- A Puro Dolor — Son by Four
- Muy Dentro de Mi — Marc Anthony
- Que Alguien Me Diga — Gilberto Santa Rosa
- Secreto De Amor — Joan Sebastian

== Hot Latin Tracks of the Year, Vocal Duo ==
- Que Locura Enamorarme de Ti — Eddie Santiago and Huey Dunbar
- Come Baby Come — Gizelle D'Cole and Elvis Crespo
- Pideme — Milly Quezada and Fernando Villalona

== Latin jazz album of the year ==
- Latin Soul — Poncho Sanchez
- ¡Muy Divertido! — Marc Ribot y Los Cubanos
- Soul of the Conga — Poncho Sanchez
- Live at the Village Vanguard — Chucho Valdés

== Latin greatest-hits album of the year ==
- Desde un Principio: From the Beginning — Marc Anthony
- The Remixes — Elvis Crespo
- The Best Hits — Enrique Iglesias
- All My Hits Vol. 2 — Selena

== Latin compilation album of the year ==
- 2000 Latin Grammy Nominees — Various Artist
- Billboard Latin Music Awards — Various Artist
- Guerra de Estados Pesados — Various Artist
- Merenhits 2000 — Various Artist

== Latin Dance Maxi-Single of the Year ==
- Sólo me importas tú — Enrique Iglesias
- Muy Dentro de Mi — Marc Anthony
- No Me Dejes de Querer — Gloria Estefan
- Shake Your Bon-Bon — Ricky Martin

== Latin Dance Club Play Track of the Year ==
- Sólo me importas tú — Enrique Iglesias
- No Me Dejes de Querer — Gloria Estefan
- Cada Vez — Negrocan
- Asi — Jon Secada

== The Billboard Latin 50 Artists of the year ==
- Son by Four
- Christina Aguilera
- Marc Anthony
- Shakira

== Hot Latin Tracks Artist of the Year ==
- Son by Four
- Marc Anthony
- Cristian Castro
- Conjunto Primavera

== Songwriter of the Year ==
- Omar Alfanno
- Estéfano
- Rudy Pérez
- Kike Santander

== Producer of the Year ==
- Rudy Pérez
- Emilio Estefan
- Alejandro Jaén
- Kike Santander

== Publisher of the year ==
- EMOA-ASCAP
- F.I.P.P, BMI
- Sony/ATV Latin, BMI
- WB, ASCAP

== Publishing corporation of the year ==
- Sony/ATV Music
- EMI Music
- F.I.P.P.
- Universal Music

== Spirit of Hope ==
- Los Tigres del Norte

== Billboard Latin Music Hall of Fame ==
- Mongo Santamaría

== Billboard Lifetime achievement award ==
- Los Lobos

== Star award ==
- Thalía
