= Premio Lo Nuestro 2001 =

Latin Music awards show

13th Lo Nuestro Awards
- Date: Thursday, February 8, 2001
- Site: James L. Knight Center; Miami, Florida, USA

Highlights
- Most awards: Son by Four (6)
- Most nominations: Son by Four (6)

The 13th Lo Nuestro Awards ceremony, presented by Univision to honor the best Latin music of 2000 and 2001, took place on February 8, 2001, at a live presentation held at the James L. Knight Center in Miami, Florida. The ceremony was broadcast in the United States and Latin America by Univision.

During the ceremony, twenty-nine categories were presented. Winners were announced at the live event and included Puerto-Rican American band Son by Four receiving six competitive awards. Mexican singer-songwriter Joan Sebastian earned three accolades and the Excellence Award; and Mexican singer Pepe Aguilar, American singer Christina Aguilera and Colombian performer Shakira earned two awards each. The 13th Lo Nuestro Awards were the first to be held since the inception of the Latin Grammy Awards.

== Background ==
In 1989, the Lo Nuestro Awards were established by Univision, to recognize the most talented performers of Latin music. The nominees and winners were selected by a voting poll conducted among program directors of Spanish-language radio stations in the United States and the results were tabulated and certified by the accounting firm Arthur Andersen. The trophy awarded is shaped like a treble clef. The 13th Lo Nuestro Awards ceremony was held on February 8, 2001, in a live presentation held at the James L. Knight Center in Miami, Florida. The ceremony was broadcast in the United States and Latin America by Univision. The categories included were for the Pop, Tropical/Salsa, Regional Mexican and Music Video fields before the 2000 awards, from 2001 onwards categories were expanded and included a Rock field; for the Regional Mexican genre a Ranchera, Grupero, Tejano and Norteño fields were added; and Traditional, Merengue and Salsa performances were also considered in the Tropical/Salsa field. Before the Latin Grammy Awards inception, the Lo Nuestro Awards were considered as the Grammy Award equivalent for Latin music. Therefore, the Lo Nuestro ceremony was advanced from May to February since the 1st Latin Grammy Awards were held in September, 2000.

== Nominees and winners ==
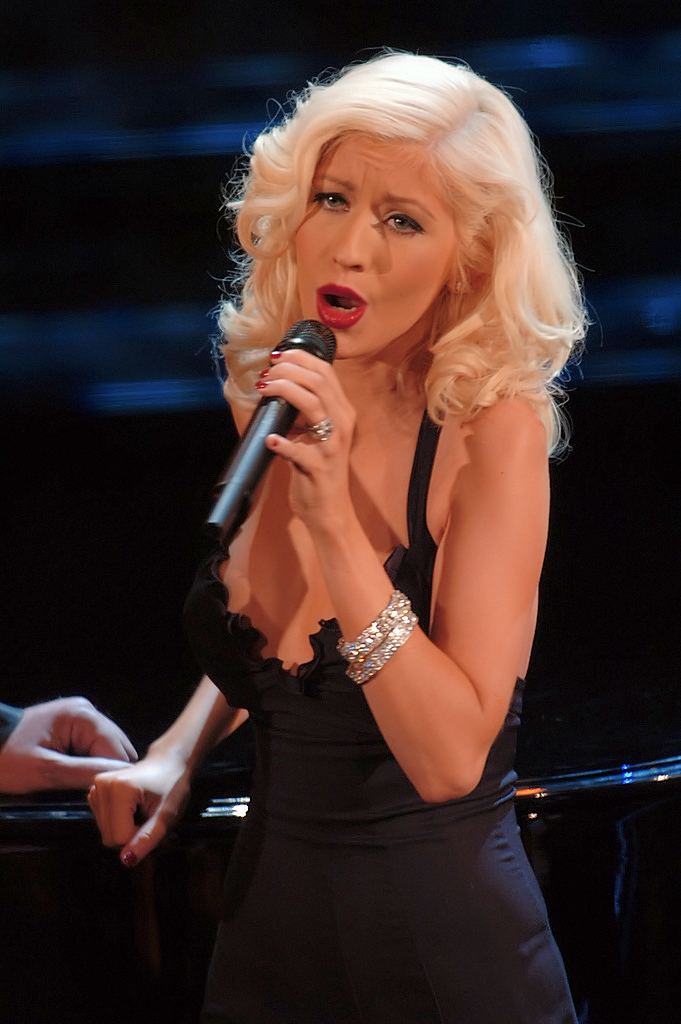
American singer Christina Aguilera (pictured in 2006) won the Lo Nuestro Award for Pop Female Artist of the Year.

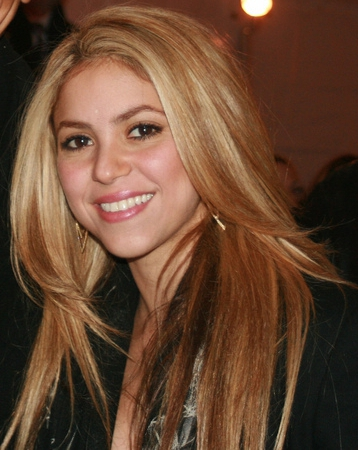
Colombian singer Shakira (pictured in 2009) was named Rock Artist of the Year.

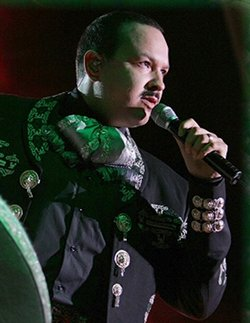
Singer-songwriter Pepe Aguilar (pictured in 2006) received the Male Regional/Mexican Artist of the Year Award.

Winners were announced before the live audience during the ceremony. Puerto Rican American band Son by Four were the most nominated performers and won their six nominations, including Pop and Tropical/Salsa Song of the Year for their single "A Puro Dolor". The song spent 20 weeks at number-one in the Billboard Top Latin Songs and is the longest-running single in the history of the chart with 61 weeks. Mexican singer Paulina Rubio was awarded for Pop Album of the Year with Paulina, the best-selling Latin album in the United States in 2001. At the newly introduced rock categories, Colombian singer-songwriter Shakira won her two nominations, Artist and Album of the Year for MTV Unplugged, which also won the Grammy Award for Best Latin Pop Album.

Mexican performer Joan Sebastian dominated the Regional/Mexican field winning Album (Secreto de Amor), Song ("Secreto de Amor"), and Grupero Performance. Sebastian also received the Excellence Award. Fellow Mexican singer Thalía was honored with the "Premio del Pueblo" (Viewers Choice) in the pop field, while Puerto-Rican American Elvis Crespo earned the same distinction for the Tropical field, and singer-songwriter Pepe Aguilar received the same accolade for the Regional/Mexican field. Aguilar also won for Ranchero Performance and Regional/Mexican Male Artist.

Nominees and winners of the 13th Annual Lo Nuestro Awards (winners listed first).

Pop Album	Pop Song
Paulina Rubio – Paulina; Christina Aguilera – Mi Reflejo; Rocío Dúrcal – Caricias; Gloria Estefan – Alma Caribeña; Luis Miguel – Vivo; Thalía – Arrasando	Son by Four – "A Puro Dolor"; Marc Anthony – "Muy Dentro de Mi"; Chayanne – "Atado a Tu Amor"; Luis Miguel – "Amarte Es Un Placer"; Jaci Velasquez – "Llegar a Ti"
Pop Male Artist	Pop Female Artist
Marc Anthony; Cristian Castro; Alejandro Fernández; Luis Miguel	Christina Aguilera; Paulina Rubio; Shakira; Jaci Velasquez
Pop Duo or Group	Pop New Artist
Son by Four; Azul Azul; MDO; OV7	Christina Aguilera; Azul Azul; Oscar De La Hoya; Tamara
Rock Album	Rock Artist
Shakira – MTV Unplugged; Café Quijano – La Extraordinaria Paradoja del Sonido Quijano; La Ley – Uno; Aleks Syntek – 89–99; El Tri – No Podemos Volar	Shakira; La Ley; Maldita Vecindad; El Tri
Regional Mexican Album	Regional Mexican Song
Joan Sebastian – Secreto de Amor; Conjunto Primavera – El Recado del Amor; Vicente Fernández – Lobo Herido; El Poder del Norte – A Ellas; Los Tigres del Norte – De Paisano a Paisano	Joan Sebastian – "Secreto de Amor"; Pepe Aguilar – "Por Una Mujer Bonita"; Banda el Recodo – "Yo Sé Que Te Acordarás"; El Poder del Norte – "A Ella"; Los Tigres del Norte – "De Paisano a Paisano"
Regional Mexican Male Artist	Regional Mexican Female Artist
Pepe Aguilar; Pedro Fernández; Vicente Fernández; Joan Sebastian	Paquita la del Barrio; Yolanda del Río; Carmen Jara; Patricia Navidad
Regional Mexican Group	New Regional Mexican Artist
Los Tigres del Norte; Los Ángeles de Charly; Banda el Recodo; Conjunto Primavera	Dinora y la Juventud; Lupillo Rivera; Los Traviesos del Norte; Voces del Rancho
Tejano Performance	Grupero Performance
Intocable; Emilio Navaira; Jennifer Peña; Bobby Pulido	Joan Sebastian; Los Ángeles de Charly; Grupo Bryndis; Límite
Ranchero Performance	Banda Performance
Pepe Aguilar; Yolanda del Río; Pedro Fernández; Vicente Fernández	Banda el Recodo; Banda Arkángel R-15; Banda Cuisillos; Banda Machos
Norteño Performance
Los Tigres del Norte; Conjunto Primavera; Los Huracanes del Norte; El Poder del Norte
Tropical Album	Tropical Song
Son by Four – Son by Four; Celia Cruz – Celia Cruz & Friends: A Night of Salsa; Tito Nieves – Así Mismo Fue; Gilberto Santa Rosa – Perdóname...Éxitos!; Sonora Tropicana – Fruta Prohibida	Son by Four – "A Puro Dolor"; Elvis Crespo – "Por el Caminito"; Gisselle – "Júrame"; Marc Anthony – "Da la Vuelta"; Carlos Vives – "Fruta Fresca"
Tropical Male Artist	Tropical Female Artist
Marc Anthony; Elvis Crespo; Gilberto Santa Rosa; Carlos Vives	Gisselle; Celia Cruz; Gloria Estefan; Milly Quezada
Merengue Artist	Salsa Artist
Elvis Crespo; Gisselle; Ilegales; Los Toros Band	Son by Four; Marc Anthony; La India; Gilberto Santa Rosa
Tropical Duo or Group	Tropical New Artist
Son by Four; DLG; Grupo Manía; Ilegales; Los Toros Band; Sonora Tropicana	Kevin Ceballo; Inocentes MC; Los Hidalgo; Vanessa
Traditional Performance	Video of the Year
Carlos Vives; Banda Blanca; Alex Bueno; Gloria Estefan; Sonora Tropicana	Ricky Martin – "She Bangs"

== Special awards ==
- Lo Nuestro Excellence Award: Joan Sebastian
- Jóvenes con Legado Award: Chayanne
- Internet Choice:
  - Pop Artist: Azul Azul
  - Tropical Artist: Carlos Vives
  - Regional/Mexican Artist: Banda el Recodo
- People's Choice:
  - Pop: Thalía
  - Tropical: Elvis Crespo
  - Regional/Mexican: Pepe Aguilar

== See also ==
- 2000 in Latin music
- 2001 in Latin music
- Latin Grammy Awards of 2000
- Grammy Award for Best Latin Pop Album
