= Júrame (Gisselle song) =

Single by Gisselle

from the album Voy a Enamorarte
- Released: 2000
- Studio: Hit Factory, Out Line, Puerto Rico; Moon, Miami, Florida
- Genre: Pop (Note: ballad version); merengue
- Length: 4:03 (ballad version); 4:01 (merengue version)
- Label: BMG US Latin
- Songwriter: Kike Santander
- Producer: Santander

Gisselle singles chronology
"Fuego en la Cintura" (1999)	"Júrame" (2000)	"Quien Te Hace el Amor" (2000)

Music video
- "Júrame" (Balada) on YouTube

"Júrame" (transl. "Swear to Me") is a song by American singer Gisselle from her seventh studio album, Voy a Enamorarte (2000). The song was written and produced by Colombian musician Kike Santander. It was recorded twice, as a pop ballad and a merengue track, respectively. In the lyrics, it deals with love's ambition. Both versions were released as a single from the album by BMG US Latin in 2000. A music video for the ballad version was filmed in Florida.

Upon its release, "Júrame" received positive reactions from music critics who found it to be one of the album's best tracks. The track received several accolades including the Latin Grammy Award for Best Tropical Song at the 2001 ceremony. Commercially, it topped the Billboard Hot Latin Songs, Latin Pop Airplay, and Tropical Airplay charts in the United States.

== Background and composition ==
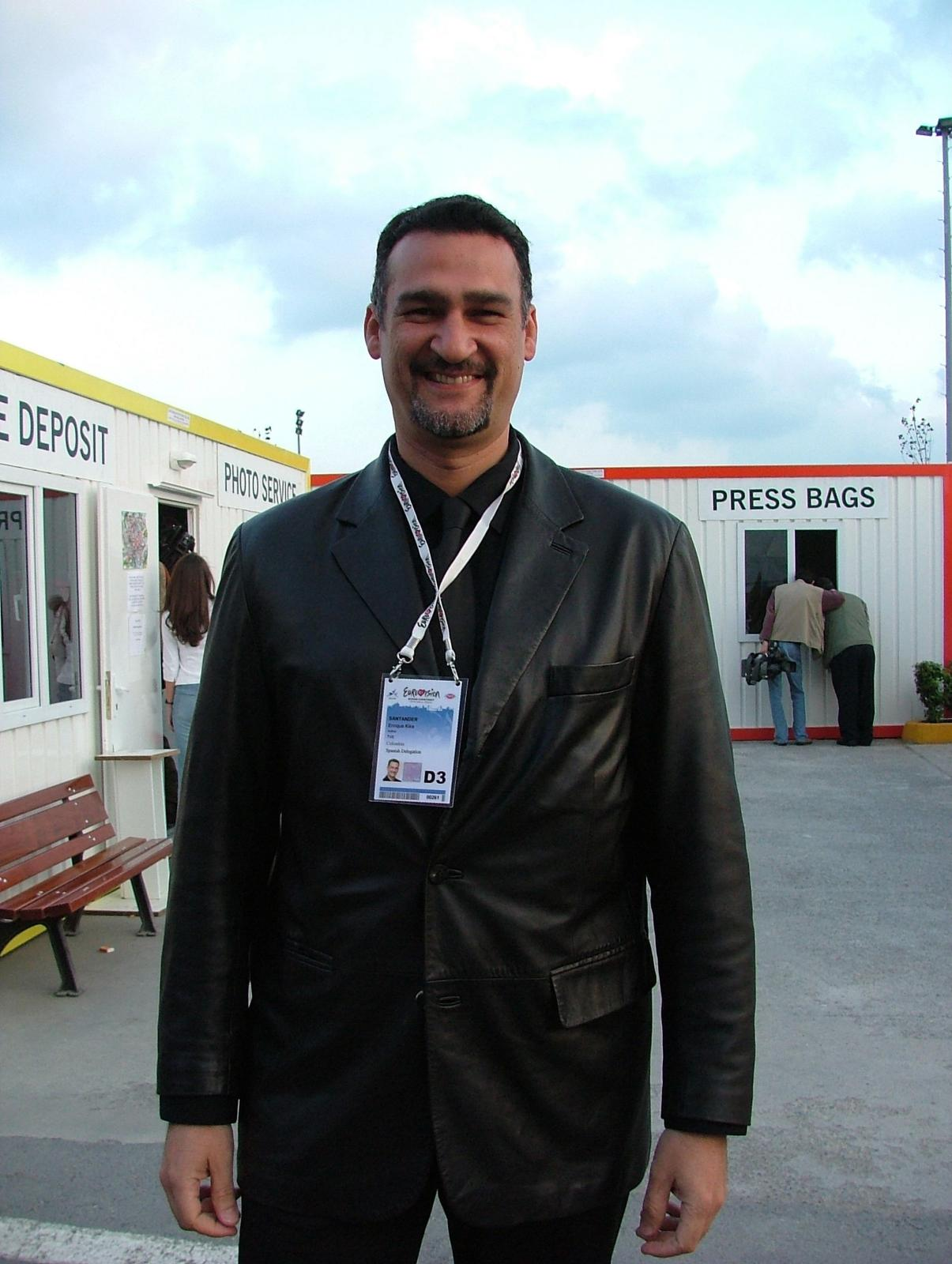
"Júrame" was composed and produced by Colombian musician Kike Santander. Santander later won the Latin Grammy Award for Best Tropical Song in 2001 for the track.

Since 1995, Gisselle had established herself as one of Puerto Rico's top female merengue singers having released six studio albums. Her previous studio album Atada (1998) received a Grammy nomination for Best Merengue Album in 2000. Gisselle had desired to record a pop ballad album for a long time. "Many people do not know that I started with pop ballads, so actually this like a return for me", the artist added. Her opportunity came after her record label BMG US Latin had a vote of confidence and brought Colombian musician Kike Santander to help with the project. It was a challenge for Santander due to the fact that Gisselle was not a balladeer.

To prepare for the album, Gisselle took lessons from a vocal coach to expand on her range and delivery. The artist also mentioned that whereas Atada had merengue songs with ballad influences, the inverse is true for Voy a Enamorarte (2000). Recording took place at the Hit Factory, Out Line Studios in Puerto Rico and Moon Red Studios in Miami, Florida. Santander handled the album's production and penned most of the album's tracks including "Júrame". The song was recorded twice, one as a pop ballad and the other a merengue track. Lyrically, the song deals with "love's ambition".

== Promotion and reception ==
Both versions of "Júrame" were released on their respective radio formats in 2000 by BMG US Latin. A music video for the ballad version was filmed in one of the beaches in Florida. Yolanda Rodriguez of the Associated Press called "Júrame" the "best in the set". The Baltimore Sun's J.D. Considine felt that both "Júrame" and "Estar Contigo" are "perfectly suited to her sound and sensibility". Writing for Newsday, Richard Torres cited the song, "Quien Te Hace el Amor", and "Voy a Enamorarte" as "such lovely love songs". MTV editor Mikel Toombs preferred the merengue version of the track. The San Antonio Express-News reviewer Ramiro Burr praised the "soulful" saxophone and commented that "Júrame" "showcases (Gisselle)'s vocal range and on-the-money phrasing". Billboard critic Michael Paoletta was not impressed with either version of the song, stating they both "come across as tepid instead of steamy".

At the 2001 2nd Annual Latin Grammy Awards, the merengue version of "Júrame" led to Santander winning the accolade for Best Tropical Song. Santander was also awarded for the track at the 2002 BMI Latin Awards. At the 8th Annual Latin Billboard Music Awards in 2001, "Júrame" was nominated in the category of Tropical/Salsa Track of the Year, but ultimately lost to "A Puro Dolor" by Son by Four. At the 13th Annual Lo Nuestro Awards in the same year, it received a nomination for Tropical Song of the Year again losing to "A Puro Dolor". It was also nominated Song of the Year at the 2001 El Premio de la Gente, which was awarded to "Abrázame Muy Fuerte" by Juan Gabriel. Commercially, "Júrame" topped the Billboard Hot Latin Songs in the United States, as well as its subcharts Latin Pop Airplay and Tropical Airplay.

== Charts ==
=== Weekly charts ===
Weekly chart positions for "Júrame"
Chart (2000)	Peak position
US Hot Latin Songs (Billboard)	1
US Latin Pop Airplay (Billboard)	1
US Tropical Airplay (Billboard)	1

=== Year-end charts ===
2000 year-end chart performance for "Júrame"
Chart (2000)	Position
US Hot Latin Songs (Billboard)	14
US Latin Pop Airplay (Billboard)	12
US Tropical Airplay (Billboard)	6

== See also ==
- List of number-one Billboard Hot Latin Tracks of 2000
- List of Billboard Latin Pop Airplay number ones of 2000
- List of Billboard Tropical Airplay number ones of 2000
