= List of Billboard Latin Pop Airplay number ones of 2000 =

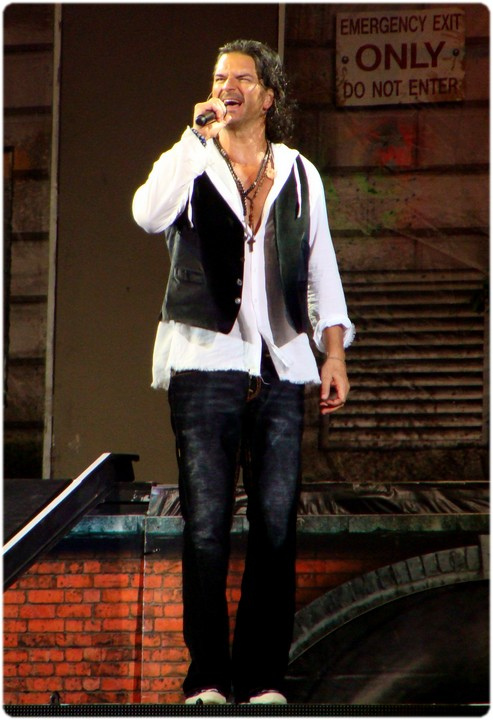
Ricardo Arjona spent a total of 19 weeks at number one with two songs.

Latin Pop Airplay (formerly designated as Hot Latin Pop Tracks) is a chart published by Billboard magazine that ranks the top-performing songs (regardless of genre or language) on Latin pop radio stations in the United States, based on weekly airplay data compiled by Nielsen's Broadcast Data Systems. It is a subchart of Hot Latin Songs (formerly known as Hot Latin Tracks), which lists the best-performing Spanish-language songs in the country. In 2000, eight songs topped the chart, in 52 issues of the magazine.

At the start of the year, singer-songwriter Ricardo Arjona's song "Desnuda" was at number one, where it spent 12 consecutive weeks before being replaced by "Dónde Está el Amor", performed by Charlie Zaa, in the issue dated March 25. Arjona returned to the top of the chart with his next single, "Cuando", which spent seven weeks at number one between September and November; he was the only artist with more than one chart-topper during the year.

"A Puro Dolor" by Son by Four was the best-performing song of 2000 on both the Latin pop and Hot Latin Songs charts. It spent a total of 19 non-consecutive weeks at number one on the airplay chart, breaking the record for the most weeks at number one set by Cristian Castro's song "Vuélveme a Querer" in 1995. Latin pop stations received the ballad rendition of the track, propelling its ascent to popularity subsequent to its inclusion in the Mexican soap opera La vida en el espejo (1999). Despite this level of success, it would be the band's only chart-topper.

Thalía achieved her first chart-topper with "Entre el Mar y una Estrella" as did Giselle with the ballad version of "Júrame". Chayanne had the final number-one song of the year with "Yo Te Amo" which spent eight weeks at this position.

== Chart history ==
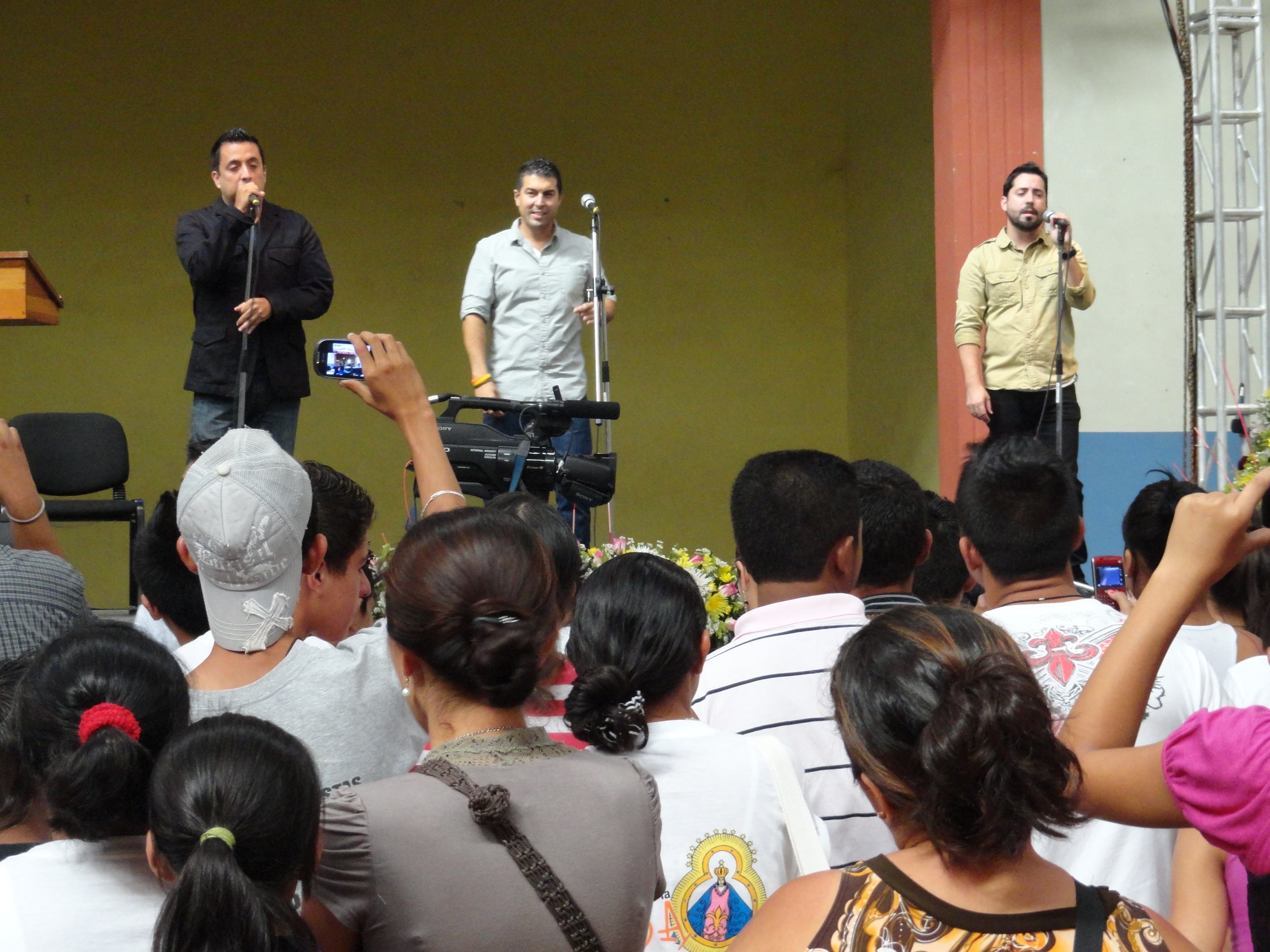
"A Puro Dolor" by Son by Four was the longest-running number one of the year with 19 nonconsecutive weeks at the top spot. It was also named the best-performing Latin pop song of the year.

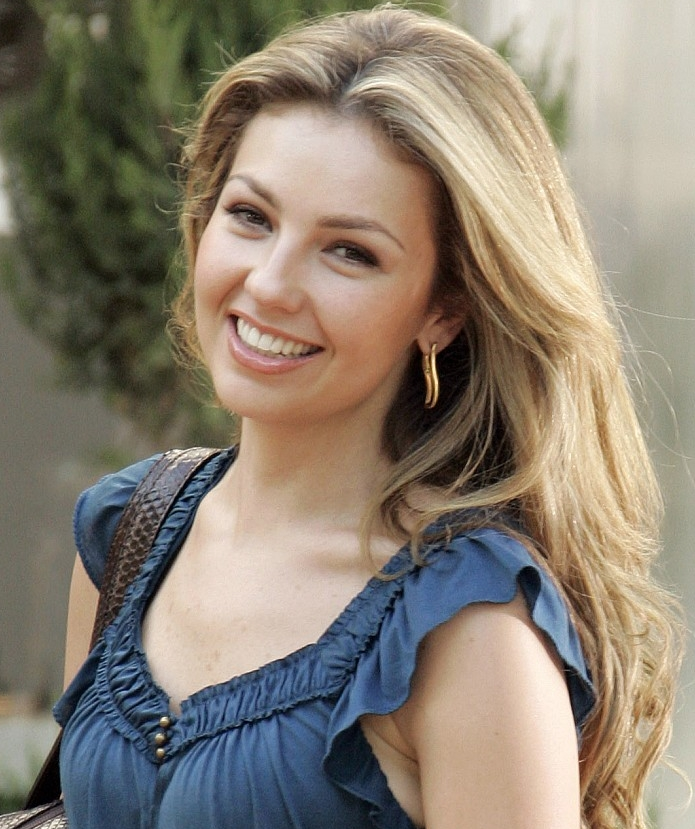
Singer Thalía obtained her first chart-topper with "Entre el Mar y una Estrella".

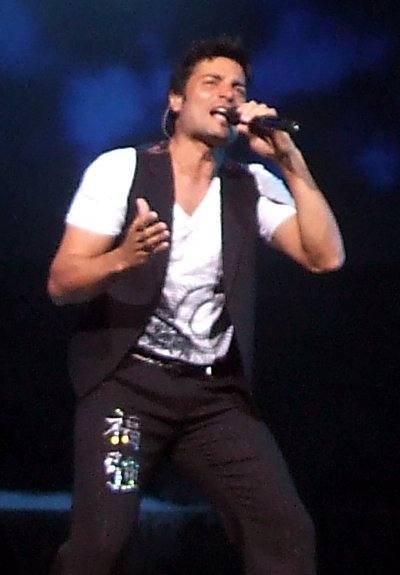
Singer Chayanne had the final number one of the year with "Yo Te Amo" which remained at the top of the chart for eight weeks.

Key
†	Indicates number 1 on Billboard's year-end Latin pop chart

Chart history
Issue date	Title	Artist(s)	Ref.
January 1	"Desnuda"	Ricardo Arjona	
January 8	"Desnuda"	Ricardo Arjona	
January 15	"Desnuda"	Ricardo Arjona	
January 22	"Desnuda"	Ricardo Arjona	
January 29	"Desnuda"	Ricardo Arjona	
February 5	"Desnuda"	Ricardo Arjona	
February 12	"Desnuda"	Ricardo Arjona	
February 19	"Desnuda"	Ricardo Arjona	
February 26	"Desnuda"	Ricardo Arjona	
March 4	"Desnuda"	Ricardo Arjona	
March 11	"Desnuda"	Ricardo Arjona	
March 18	"Desnuda"	Ricardo Arjona	
March 25	"Dónde Está el Amor"	Charlie Zaa	
April 1	"Dónde Está el Amor"	Charlie Zaa	
April 8	"A Puro Dolor" †	Son by Four	
April 15	"A Puro Dolor" †	Son by Four	
April 22	"A Puro Dolor" †	Son by Four	
April 29	"A Puro Dolor" †	Son by Four	
May 6	"A Puro Dolor" †	Son by Four	
May 13	"A Puro Dolor" †	Son by Four	
May 20	"A Puro Dolor" †	Son by Four	
May 27	"A Puro Dolor" †	Son by Four	
June 3	"A Puro Dolor" †	Son by Four	
June 10	"No Me Dejes de Querer"	Gloria Estefan	
June 17	"Entre el Mar y una Estrella"	Thalía	
June 24	"A Puro Dolor" †	Son by Four	
July 1	"A Puro Dolor" †	Son by Four	
July 8	"Entre el Mar y una Estrella"	Thalía	
July 15	"Entre el Mar y una Estrella"	Thalía	
July 22	"A Puro Dolor" †	Son by Four	
July 29	"A Puro Dolor" †	Son by Four	
August 5	"A Puro Dolor" †	Son by Four	
August 12	"Júrame"	Gisselle	
August 19	"A Puro Dolor" †	Son by Four	
August 26	"A Puro Dolor" †	Son by Four	
September 2	"A Puro Dolor" †	Son by Four	
September 9	"A Puro Dolor" †	Son by Four	
September 16	"A Puro Dolor" †	Son by Four	
September 23	"Cuando"	Ricardo Arjona	
September 30	"Cuando"	Ricardo Arjona	
October 7	"Cuando"	Ricardo Arjona	
October 14	"Cuando"	Ricardo Arjona	
October 21	"Cuando"	Ricardo Arjona	
October 28	"Cuando"	Ricardo Arjona	
November 4	"Cuando"	Ricardo Arjona	
November 11	"Yo Te Amo"	Chayanne	
November 18	"Yo Te Amo"	Chayanne	
November 25	"Yo Te Amo"	Chayanne	
December 2	"Yo Te Amo"	Chayanne	
December 9	"Yo Te Amo"	Chayanne	
December 16	"Yo Te Amo"	Chayanne	
December 23	"Yo Te Amo"	Chayanne	
December 30	"Yo Te Amo"	Chayanne	
