= List of number-one Billboard Hot Latin Tracks of 2000 =

This is a list containing the Billboard Hot Latin Tracks number-ones of 2000.

| Issue date | Song | Artist(s) | Ref. |
|---|---|---|---|
| January 1 | "Ritmo Total" | Enrique Iglesias | |
| January 8 | "Fruta Fresca" | Carlos Vives | |
| January 15 | "Te Quiero Mucho" | Los Rieleros del Norte | |
| January 22 | "Fruta Fresca" | Carlos Vives | |
| January 29 | "Fruta Fresca" | Carlos Vives | |
| February 5 | "Desnuda" | Ricardo Arjona | |
| February 12 | "Fruta Fresca" | Carlos Vives | |
| February 19 | "Desnuda" | Ricardo Arjona | |
| February 26 | "Fruta Fresca" | Carlos Vives | |
| March 4 | "Fruta Fresca" | Carlos Vives | |
| March 11 | "Que Alguien Me Diga" | Gilberto Santa Rosa | |
| March 18 | "Que Alguien Me Diga" | Gilberto Santa Rosa | |
| March 25 | "Que Alguien Me Diga" | Gilberto Santa Rosa | |
| April 1 | "A Puro Dolor" | Son by Four | |
| April 8 | "A Puro Dolor" | Son by Four | |
| April 15 | "A Puro Dolor" | Son by Four | |
| April 22 | "A Puro Dolor" | Son by Four | |
| April 29 | "A Puro Dolor" | Son by Four | |
| May 6 | "A Puro Dolor" | Son by Four | |
| May 13 | "A Puro Dolor" | Son by Four | |
| May 20 | "A Puro Dolor" | Son by Four | |
| May 27 | "A Puro Dolor" | Son by Four | |
| June 3 | "A Puro Dolor" | Son by Four | |
| June 10 | "No Me Dejes de Querer" | Gloria Estefan | |
| June 17 | "Entre El Mar Y Una Estrella" | Thalía | |
| June 24 | "A Puro Dolor" | Son by Four | |
| July 1 | "Muy Dentro de Mí" | Marc Anthony | |
| July 8 | "Muy Dentro de Mí" | Marc Anthony | |
| July 15 | "Muy Dentro de Mí" | Marc Anthony | |
| July 22 | "A Puro Dolor" | Son by Four | |
| July 29 | "A Puro Dolor" | Son by Four | |
| August 5 | "A Puro Dolor" | Son by Four | |
| August 12 | "Júrame" | Gisselle | |
| August 19 | "A Puro Dolor" | Son by Four | |
| August 26 | "A Puro Dolor" | Son by Four | |
| September 2 | "A Puro Dolor" | Son by Four | |
| September 9 | "Imaginame Sin Ti" | Luis Fonsi | |
| September 16 | "Imaginame Sin Ti" | Luis Fonsi | |
| September 23 | "Como Me Duele Perderte" | Gloria Estefan | |
| September 30 | "Como Me Duele Perderte" | Gloria Estefan | |
| October 7 | "Cuando" | Ricardo Arjona | |
| October 14 | "Ven Conmigo (Solamente Tú)" | Christina Aguilera | |
| October 21 | "Ven Conmigo (Solamente Tú)" | Christina Aguilera | |
| October 28 | "Ven a Mí" | Oscar De La Hoya | |
| November 4 | "She Bangs" | Ricky Martin | |
| November 11 | "A Puro Dolor" | Son by Four | |
| November 18 | "A Puro Dolor" | Son by Four | |
| November 25 | "A Puro Dolor" | Son by Four | |
| December 2 | "Yo Te Amo" | Chayanne | |
| December 9 | "Yo Te Amo" | Chayanne | |
| December 16 | "Yo Te Amo" | Chayanne | |
| December 23 | "Yo Te Amo" | Chayanne | |
| December 30 | "Cuando Seas Mía (Miss Me So Bad)" | Son By Four | |

== See also ==
- 2000 in Latin music
- Billboard Hot Latin Tracks
