= Que Alguien Me Diga =

Song by Gilberto Santa Rosa

from the album Expresión
- Released: 1999
- Genre: Salsa
- Length: 4:50 (salsa version); 4:09 (ballad version)
- Label: Sony Discos
- Songwriter: Omar Alfanno
- Producers: José Lugo; Gilberto Santa Rosa

Music video
- "Que Alguien Me Diga" on YouTube

"Que Alguien Me Diga" (Someone Tell Me) is a song by Puerto Rican singer Gilberto Santa Rosa from his 12th studio album, Expresión (1999). It was written by Omar Alfanno with José Lugo and the artist handling its production. It is a salsa track in which the singer is searching for unconditional love. Santa Rosa would later record a ballad version. An accompanying music video features the singer in a dark room surrounded by female musicians. Both versions of the song received airplay on Latin radio stations.

Commercially, it topped the Billboard Hot Latin Songs and Tropical Airplay charts in the United States. It was nominated Song of the Year at the 2000 El Premio de la Gente as well as Tropical/Salsa Track of the Year at the 8th Annual Latin Billboard Music Awards in 2001. It was recognized as Salsa Song of the Year at the American Society of Composers, Authors and Publishers (ASCAP) Latin Awards. "Que Alguien Me Diga" has been covered by Lucero and in English as "Can Someone Tell Me" by Son by Four.

== Background and composition ==
In 1999, Gilberto Santa Rosa released his 12th studio album, Expresión, an album which the artist described as a combination of "classic salsa with a mix of modern sounds". The album was produced by José Lugo and the artist himself. Several composers contributed to the album's songwriting, including Omar Alfanno, who penned the track "Que Alguien Me Diga". Lyrically, the song deals with a man "who's searching for unconditional love". Santa Rosa would later record a ballad version of the song which was included in the reissue of the album.

== Promotion and reception ==
An accompanying music video was filmed and features the artist sitting in a dark room with female violinists and celloists playing. An editor for Latin Style magazine wrote that both "Déjate Querer" and "Que Alguien Me Diga" are "certainly on their way to becoming the favorites from this CD". Jessica Roiz listed "Que Alguien Me Diga" as one of the artist's best salsa songs. At the 8th Annual Latin Billboard Music Awards in 2001, "Que Alguien Me Diga" was nominated in the categories of Hot Latin Song of the Year and Tropical/Salsa Track of the Year but ultimately lost both to "A Puro Dolor" by Son by Four. It also received a nomination at the 2000 El Premio de la Gente in the category of Song of the Year but again lost to "A Puro Dolor". At the 2001 ASCAP Latin Music Awards, it was recognized as Salsa Song of the Year. Commercially, it became Santa Rosa's first number one on the Billboard Hot Latin Songs chart and peaked at number seven on the Latin Pop Airplay chart in the US. It also became his fourth number one on the Tropical Airplay chart and was the second best-performing Latin song in the country. Billboard editor John Lannert noted the song benefited from being recorded in both versions on radio stations.

The song was covered by Mexican singer Lucero as a mariachi tune on her studio album, Un Nuevo Amor (2002), where it was released as its lead single. It was adapted in English as "Can Someone Tell Me" by Son by Four on their studio album Purest of Pain (2000). The group's former lead singer Ángel López would then cover "Que Alguien Me Diga" on his studio album Historias de Amor, a collection of songs Alfanno had previously composed. The song, along with the rest of the album, was arranged and produced by Alfanno.

== Charts ==
=== Weekly charts ===
Chart performance for "Que Alguien Me Diga"
Chart (2000)	Peak position
US Hot Latin Songs (Billboard)	1
US Latin Pop Airplay (Billboard)	7
US Tropical Airplay (Billboard)	1

=== Year-end charts ===
2000 year-end chart performance for "Que Alguien Me Diga"
Chart (2000)	Position
US Hot Latin Songs (Billboard)	2
US Tropical Airplay (Billboard)	2

=== Decade-end charts ===
Decade-end chart performance for "Que Alguien Me Diga"
Chart (2000–09)	Position
US Hot Latin Songs (Billboard)	45
US Tropical Airplay (Billboard)	9

== See also ==
- List of number-one Billboard Hot Latin Tracks of 2000
- List of Billboard Tropical Airplay number ones of 2000
