= Lo Nuestro Award for Salsa Artist of the Year =

Latin music award

- Awarded for: Best Salsa Performance
- Country: United States
- Presented by: Univision
- First award: 2001
- Currently held by: Marc Anthony (2014)

Highlights
- Most awards: Marc Anthony (5)
- Most nominations: Marc Anthony (10)
- Website: univision.com/premiolonuestro

The Lo Nuestro Award for Best Salsa Performance (or Lo Nuestro Award for Salsa Artist of the Year) is an honor presented annually by American network Univision. The Lo Nuestro Awards were first awarded in 1989 and has been given annually since to recognize the most talented performers of Latin music. The nominees and winners were originally selected by a voting poll conducted among program directors of Spanish-language radio stations in the United States and also based on chart performance on Billboard Latin music charts, with the results being tabulated and certified by the accounting firm Deloitte. At the present time, the winners are selected by the audience through an online survey. The trophy awarded is shaped in the form of a treble clef.

The award was first presented to Puerto-Rican American band Son by Four in 2001. American performer Marc Anthony holds the record for the most awards with five, and most nominations with nine. Multiple winners include Nicaraguan singer Luis Enrique and American performer Víctor Manuelle with three awards each. Puerto-Rican American singer Jerry Rivera is the most nominated performer without a win, with five unsuccessful nominations.

== Winners and nominees ==
Listed below are the winners and nominees of the award for each year.

Key	Meaning
‡	Indicates the winner

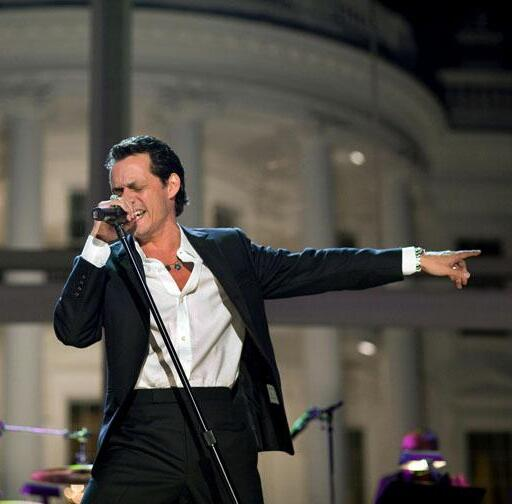
American singer Marc Anthony (pictured in 2009), the most awarded performer, winning four times

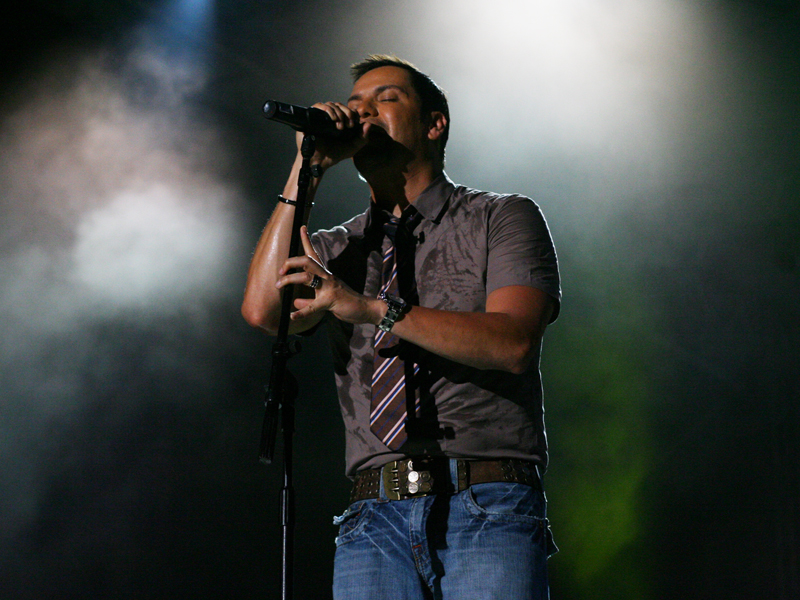
American singer Víctor Manuelle (pictured in 2007), three-time winner

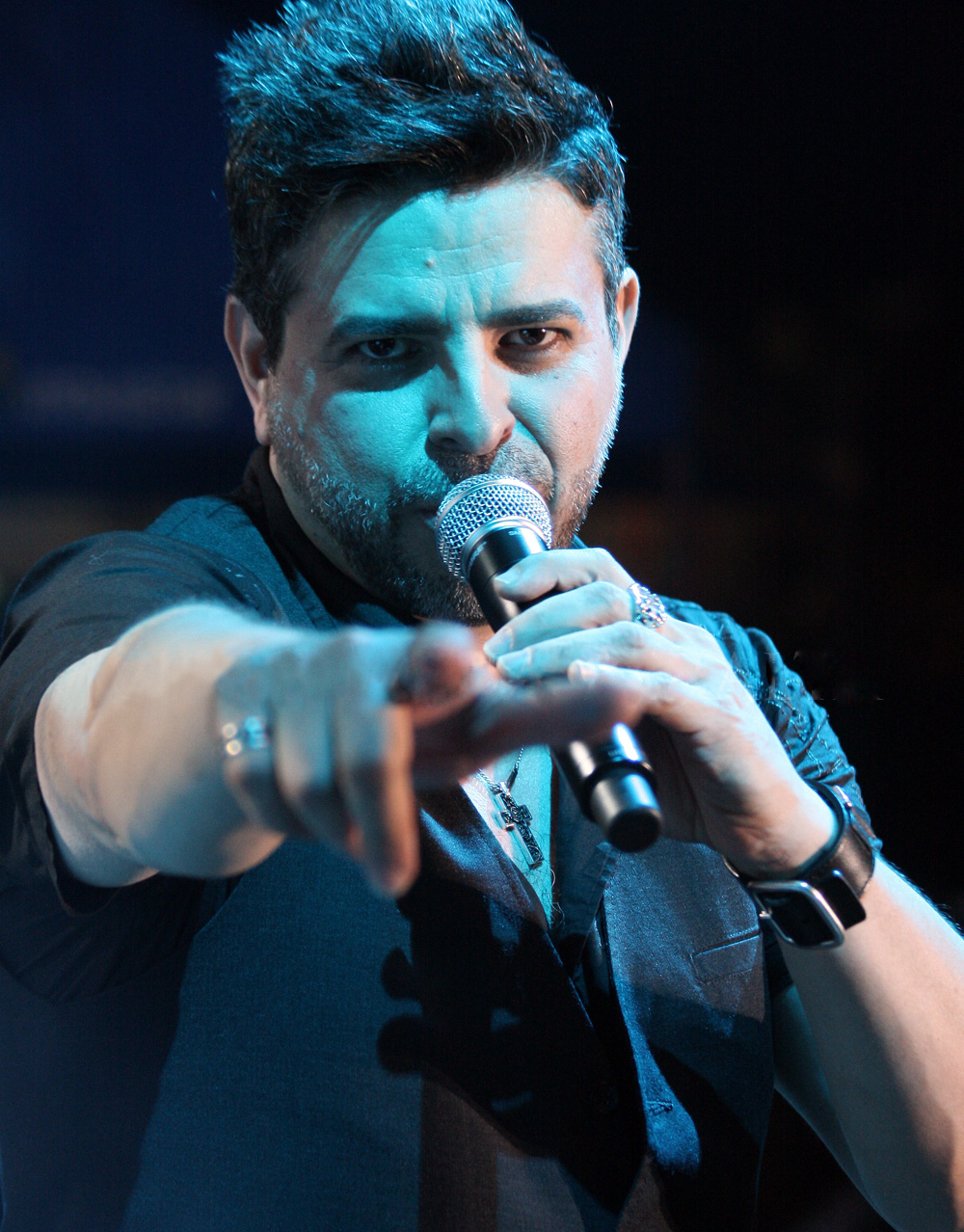
Nicaraguan performer Luis Enrique (pictured in 2010), three-time winner

Year	Performer	Ref
2001 (13th)	Son by Four‡	
2001 (13th)	Marc Anthony	
2001 (13th)	La India	
2001 (13th)	Gilberto Santa Rosa	
2002 (14th)	Gilberto Santa Rosa‡	
2002 (14th)	Frankie Negrón	
2002 (14th)	Jerry Rivera	
2002 (14th)	Víctor Manuelle	
2003 (15th)	Celia Cruz‡	
2003 (15th)	Marc Anthony	
2003 (15th)	El Gran Combo de Puerto Rico	
2003 (15th)	Gilberto Santa Rosa	
2004 (16th)	Marc Anthony‡	
2004 (16th)	La India	
2004 (16th)	Gilberto Santa Rosa	
2004 (16th)	Víctor Manuelle	
2005 (17th)	Marc Anthony‡	
2005 (17th)	Jerry Rivera	
2005 (17th)	Rey Ruiz	
2005 (17th)	Víctor Manuelle	
2006 (18th)	Marc Anthony‡	
2006 (18th)	El Gran Combo de Puerto Rico	
2006 (18th)	Tito Nieves	
2006 (18th)	Gilberto Santa Rosa	
2007 (19th)	Víctor Manuelle‡	
2007 (19th)	Marc Anthony	
2007 (19th)	Tito Nieves	
2007 (19th)	Michael Stuart	
2008 (20th)	Marc Anthony‡	
2008 (20th)	El Gran Combo de Puerto Rico	
2008 (20th)	Frankie Negrón	
2008 (20th)	Tito Nieves	
2009 (21st)	Víctor Manuelle‡	
2009 (21st)	Marc Anthony	
2009 (21st)	NG2	
2009 (21st)	N'Klabe	
2009 (21st)	Gilberto Santa Rosa	
2010 (22nd)	Luis Enrique‡	
2010 (22nd)	Adolescent's Orquesta	
2010 (22nd)	Charlie Cruz	
2010 (22nd)	Jerry Rivera	
2010 (22nd)	Gilberto Santa Rosa	
2011 (23rd)	Luis Enrique‡	
2011 (23rd)	El Gran Combo de Puerto Rico	
2011 (23rd)	Limi-T 21	
2011 (23rd)	Huey Dunbar	
2012 (24th)	Luis Enrique‡	
2012 (24th)	Charlie Cruz	
2012 (24th)	Jerry Rivera	
2012 (24th)	Gilberto Santa Rosa	
2013 (25th)	Víctor Manuelle‡	
2013 (25th)	Luis Enrique	
2013 (25th)	Tito Nieves	
2013 (25th)	Jerry Rivera	
2014 (26th)	Marc Anthony	
2014 (26th)	Juan Esteban	
2014 (26th)	N'Klabe	
2014 (26th)	Víctor Manuelle	
2015 (27th)	TBA	
2015 (27th)	Yanfourd	
2015 (27th)	Salsa Giants	
2015 (27th)	Marc Anthony	
2015 (27th)	Víctor Manuelle	

== Multiple wins/nominations ==
Number	Performer(s)
Wins
5	Marc Anthony
3	Luis Enrique
3	Víctor Manuelle
Nominations
10	Marc Anthony
8	Gilberto Santa Rosa
8	Víctor Manuelle
5	Jerry Rivera
4	El Gran Combo de Puerto Rico
4	Luis Enrique
4	Tito Nieves
2	Charlie Cruz
2	La India
2	N'Klabe
2	Frankie Negrón

== See also ==
- Grammy Award for Best Salsa Album
- Grammy Award for Best Salsa/Merengue Album
- Latin Grammy Award for Best Salsa Album
