= List of number-one Billboard Top Latin Albums of 2000 =

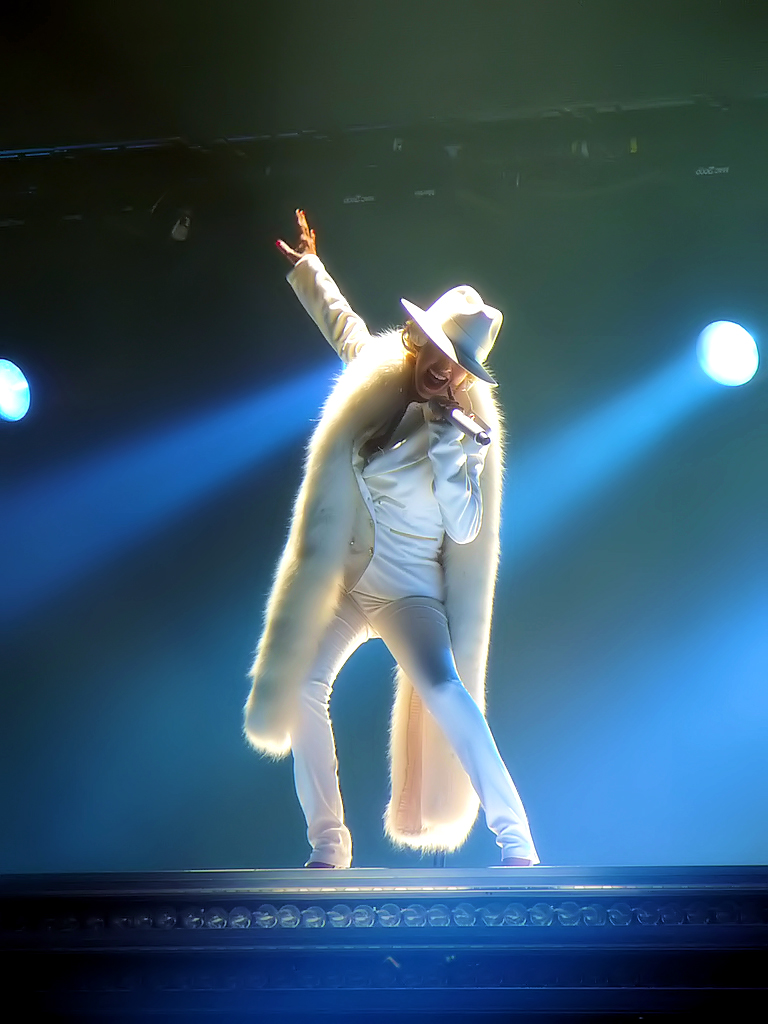
Christina Aguilera peaked at number one in 2000 with her first Spanish-language album.

The Billboard Top Latin albums chart, published in Billboard magazine, is a chart that features Latin music sales information. These data are compiled by Nielsen SoundScan from a sample that includes music stores, music departments at electronics and department stores, internet sales (both physical and via digital downloads) and verifiable sales from concert venues in United States.

There were eleven number-one albums on this chart in 2000, including the greatest hits collection Desde Un Principio: From the Beginning by Marc Anthony, which spent a non-consecutive run of 13 weeks at the top of the chart starting in early December 1999. Los Temerarios and Conjunto Primavera peaked at number one for the first time with Morir de Amor and En La Madrugada se Fue, respectively. Both albums received Latin Grammy nominations for Best Grupero Performance, which was awarded to the latter one. MTV Unplugged, by Colombian performer Shakira, also peaked at number one for two weeks and went on to win the Grammy Award for Best Latin Pop Album at the 43rd Grammy Awards. With All My Hits - Todos Mis Exitos Vol. 2, Tejano music performer Selena had her sixth album peak at number one (the fifth to do so posthumously). Son By Four spent 12 non-consecutive weeks at the summit with their eponymous album, which received a gold certification by the Recording Industry Association of America.

Mexican performer Alejandro Fernández and Cuban singer–songwriter Gloria Estefan both released the second number-one albums of their careers. Guerra de Estados Pesados, a compilation album with music by Chuy Vega, El Jilguero, El Original de la Sierra, El Marquez de Sinaloa, Los Gatilleros de Durango, Los Herederos del Norte, Los Traileros de Durango and Los Comandantes de Nuevo León, spent one week at the top but dropped to number 16 the following week. Christina Aguilera spent 14 weeks at number one with her first Spanish album Mi Reflejo, and Galería Caribe by Guatemalan singer-songwriter Ricardo Arjona also hit the top spot of the chart.

== Albums ==
| Issue Date | Album | Artist | Reference |
|---|---|---|---|
| January 1 | Desde Un Principio: From the Beginning | Marc Anthony | |
| January 8 | Desde Un Principio: From the Beginning | Marc Anthony | |
| January 15 | Desde Un Principio: From the Beginning | Marc Anthony | |
| January 22 | Desde Un Principio: From the Beginning | Marc Anthony | |
| January 30 | Desde Un Principio: From the Beginning | Marc Anthony | |
| February 5 | Desde Un Principio: From the Beginning | Marc Anthony | |
| February 12 | Morir de Amor (Dying of Love) | Conjunto Primavera | |
| February 19 | Morir de Amor (Dying of Love) | Conjunto Primavera | |
| February 26 | Desde Un Principio: From the Beginning | Marc Anthony | |
| March 4 | Desde Un Principio: From the Beginning | Marc Anthony | |
| March 11 | Desde Un Principio: From the Beginning | Marc Anthony | |
| March 18 | En La Madrugada se Fue (Left In the Morning) | Los Temerarios | |
| March 25 | En La Madrugada se Fue (Left In the Morning) | Los Temerarios | |
| April 1 | En La Madrugada se Fue (Left In the Morning) | Los Temerarios | |
| April 8 | MTV Unplugged | Shakira | |
| April 15 | All My Hits - Todos Mis Exitos Vol. 2 | Selena | |
| April 22 | MTV Unplugged | Shakira | |
| April 29 | Son By Four | Son By Four | |
| May 6 | Guerra de Estados Pesados (Heavy States War) | Various Artists | |
| May 13 | Entre tus Brazos (In Your Arms) | Alejandro Fernández | |
| May 20 | Son By Four | Son By Four | |
| May 27 | Son By Four | Son By Four | |
| June 3 | Son By Four | Son By Four | |
| June 10 | Alma Caribeña - Caribbean Soul | Gloria Estefan | |
| June 17 | Alma Caribeña - Caribbean Soul | Gloria Estefan | |
| June 24 | Alma Caribeña - Caribbean Soul | Gloria Estefan | |
| July 1 | Alma Caribeña - Caribbean Soul | Gloria Estefan | |
| July 8 | Alma Caribeña - Caribbean Soul | Gloria Estefan | |
| July 15 | Alma Caribeña - Caribbean Soul | Gloria Estefan | |
| July 22 | Alma Caribeña - Caribbean Soul | Gloria Estefan | |
| July 29 | Son By Four | Son By Four | |
| August 5 | Son By Four | Son By Four | |
| August 12 | Son By Four | Son By Four | |
| August 19 | Son By Four | Son By Four | |
| August 26 | Son By Four | Son By Four | |
| September 2 | Son By Four | Son By Four | |
| September 9 | Son By Four | Son By Four | |
| September 16 | Galería Caribe (Caribbean Gallery) | Ricardo Arjona | |
| September 23 | Son By Four | Son By Four | |
| September 30 | Mi Reflejo (My Reflection) | Christina Aguilera | |
| October 7 | Mi Reflejo (My Reflection) | Christina Aguilera | |
| October 14 | Mi Reflejo (My Reflection) | Christina Aguilera | |
| October 21 | Mi Reflejo (My Reflection) | Christina Aguilera | |
| October 28 | Mi Reflejo (My Reflection) | Christina Aguilera | |
| November 4 | Mi Reflejo (My Reflection) | Christina Aguilera | |
| November 11 | Mi Reflejo (My Reflection) | Christina Aguilera | |
| November 18 | Mi Reflejo (My Reflection) | Christina Aguilera | |
| November 25 | Mi Reflejo (My Reflection) | Christina Aguilera | |
| December 2 | Mi Reflejo (My Reflection) | Christina Aguilera | |
| December 9 | Mi Reflejo (My Reflection) | Christina Aguilera | |
| December 16 | Mi Reflejo (My Reflection) | Christina Aguilera | |
| December 23 | Mi Reflejo (My Reflection) | Christina Aguilera | |
| December 30 | Mi Reflejo (My Reflection) | Christina Aguilera | |
