= Júrame =

"Júrame" may refer to:

- "Júrame" (María Grever song), 1976
- "Júrame" (Gisselle song), 2000
