= Yo Te Amo =

Single by Chayanne

from the album Simplemente
- Released: 2000
- Genre: Latin pop
- Length: 4:43
- Label: Sony Discos
- Songwriter: Estéfano
- Producer: Estéfano

Chayanne singles chronology
"Boom Boom" (2000)	"Yo Te Amo" (2000)	"Candela" (2000)

Music video
- "Yo Te Amo" on YouTube

"Yo Te Amo" (transl. "I Love You") is a song by Puerto Rican singer Chayanne from his ninth studio album, Simplemente (2000). The song was written and produced by Estéfano and released as the lead single from the album in 2000 by Sony Discos in the United States. It was -recognized as one of the best-performing Latin songs of the year at the 2002 BMI Latin Awards. The Newsday Richard Torres stated that "Yo Te Amo", along with "Las Horas Pasan" and "Simplemente" have "no distinguishing sound or verve to them". Jordan Levin of the Miami Herald found it to be "syrupy". The music video for the song was directed by Simon Brand and was filmed in Los Angeles. It is also used for Meteor Garden II in the music video featuring clips.

== Charts ==
=== Weekly charts ===
Chart (2000)	Peak position
Chile (EFE)	1
Costa Rica (EFE)	4
El Salvador (EFE)	4
Guatemala (EFE)	4
Honduras (EFE)	1
Nicaragua (EFE)	1
Panama (EFE)	3
Uruguay (EFE)	2
US Hot Latin Songs (Billboard)	1
US Latin Pop Airplay (Billboard)	1

=== Year-end charts ===
Chart (2001)	Position
US Hot Latin Songs (Billboard)	7
US Latin Pop Airplay (Billboard)	3

=== Decade-end charts ===
2000s decade-end chart performance for "Yo Te Amo"
Chart (2000–2009)	Position
US Hot Latin Songs (Billboard)	84
US Latin Pop Airplay (Billboard)	15

== Certifications ==
Region	Certification	Certified units/sales
Mexico (AMPROFON)	3× Platinum	180,000^{‡}
^{‡} Sales+streaming figures based on certification alone.

== See also ==
- Billboard Hot Latin Songs Year-End Chart
- List of number-one Billboard Hot Latin Tracks of 2000
- List of Billboard Latin Pop Airplay number ones of 2000
- List of number-one Billboard Hot Latin Tracks of 2001
- List of Billboard Latin Pop Airplay number ones of 2001
