= Dónde está el Amor =

Dónde está el Amor may refer to:

- "Dónde Está el Amor" (Charlie Zaa song), 2000
- "Dónde está el Amor" (Pablo Alborán song), 2012
