= Oscar Llord =

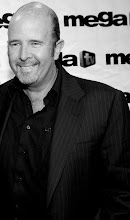
- Born: Oscar Joseph Llord; July 25, 1957 (age 69); Havana, Cuba
- Occupation: Music Executive/Record Producer/Business Owner
- Years active: 1978-present
- Partner: Rosana Mattioli
- Children: 6

Oscar Joseph Llord (born July 25, 1957) is a Latin music entertainment executive, producer and businessman. He is the owner of We R 1 Music Group. Llord headed Sony Music Entertainment's Latin division (the Sony Discos label and Sony/ATV Latin publishing) from 1996 through 2003.

During his tenure, the company rose to dominance in the US Latin music industry and produced, a large crossover campaign of Latin artists (Ricky Martin, Shakira, Marc Anthony, Son by Four, Jennifer Lopez, Elvis Crespo, and Frankie J.). It was heralded the “Latin Explosion”. Billboard Magazine recognized Son by Four's “A Puro Dolor”, which Llord executive produced the Latin track of the decade in 2009. He has also headed EMI US Latin, TH-Rodven Records, Sonotone Music, SBS Entertainment, and owned OLE Music, RTP Records, Extreme Studios, Cuberoot Music Publishing, and the boy band Menudo.

== Early life ==
Llord was born in Havana, Cuba, and at the age of four, moved with his parents to Long Island, New York. They relocated to Miami in 1968, where he learned to play guitar, write songs, and perform in local top 40 music bands.

The legendary disco label TK records took notice of Llord's songwriting and producing skills in 1978, when one of their stars Celi Bee recorded his song “Give It To Me”. That led to an exclusive songwriter-producer contract with TK and allowed him to participate in recording sessions with KC and the Sunshine Band, Timmy Thomas, and Peter Brown.

When the popularity of disco began to fade, Llord switched over to the field of Latin music where a burgeoning business was starting to emerge. Over the next three decades, he went on to become a driving force as a record executive and entrepreneur, expanding the Latin music industry in America to unprecedented heights of success.

Llord attended high school at Christopher Columbus and Southwest Senior High in Westchester, Florida and earned a degree in Business Administration at Miami Dade College.

== Sony Music Entertainment ==
In 1996, Llord's record label RTP Records (Right Touch Productions) was acquired by Sony Music Entertainment. As part of the deal, Sony Music chief Tommy Mottola hired him to head up and revamp their fledging Latin company Sony Discos. Under Llord's direction, the company became the #1 Latin music label in the business. Sony Discos ruled the Billboard Latin charts, was the first Spanish language music company to surpass $100 million in annual sales, and held the highest market share according to the Recording Industry Association of America.

Llord was promoted to president of crossover for the North American market in 2001. In that role, he was made responsible for supervising the development of crossover talent on Sony's worldwide roster, including their American labels Columbia and Epic Records. When Sony purchased the Telemundo TV Network, Llord created synergies between the network and Sony's Latin music divisions. He executive produced the popular talent search show “Protagonistas de la Musica”, numerous chart topping soap opera soundtracks, and played a key role in securing the rights to the Billboard Latin Music Awards for Telemundo.

Displeased with Sony for giving up too much management control to BMG during merger negotiations, Llord resigned from the company in May 2003.

== After Sony ==
Upon exiting Sony, Llord formed OLE Music (Oscar Llord Entertainment) under a joint venture with Universal Music & Video Distribution. There he signed and produced Grammy nominated recordings with Tommy Torres and Latin rock band Black Guayaba. OLE garnered BMI's most played urban song of the year award with Master Joe's “Mil Amores” featuring Pitbull's first Spanish language performance. Llord also managed the career comeback of international stars Elvis Crespo and Charlie Zaa. The company was sold to Universal Latin in 2008*.

Next he pursued his passion for live entertainment by entering into a partnership with Spanish Broadcasting System to run SBS Entertainment. At SBS, Llord expanded their annual Latin music festivals CaliBash, El Megaton, and El Dia de la Salsa into arena size events. He produced the company's 25th anniversary extravaganza at Miami's American Airlines Arena that included superstars Shakira, Carlos Vives, Luis Fonsi, Daddy Yankee, and Marco Antonio Solis. In December 2008, he co-produced with Larry Stein El Megaton's 5 consecutive sold-out concerts by bachata group Aventura, and established the all time tickets sales record of 75,600 at San Juan, Puerto Rico's El Coliseo.

In recent years, Llord has owned and operated We R 1 Music Group, focusing on sales and acquisitions of entertainment brands and catalogues. He joined forces with Paul Tarnopol, the owner of Brunswick Records, in 2016 to acquire the world-famous Menudo trademark from New York-based Big Bar Enterprises. They are developing plans for a national talent search to launch a new incarnation of the iconic boy band. A television series on the history of Menudo will air on Amazon Prime in 2019.

== Personal life ==
Llord met his partner Rosana Mattioli while working together at TH-Rodven Records. They have been together since 2001 and have parented a daughter named Nicole. He has 3 more daughters Anne Marie, Jenniver, and Jessica, and 2 stepchildren Vicky and Richard from previous marriages. Llord resides in High Pines, Florida.
