= Cuando (song) =

Single by Ricardo Arjona

from the album Galería Caribe
- Released: 2000
- Genre: Latin pop
- Length: 4:34
- Label: Sony Discos
- Songwriter: Ricardo Arjona
- Producers: Ricardo Arjona; Ángel Peña

Ricardo Arjona singles chronology
"Historias" (2000)	"Cuando" (2000)	"Te Enamoraste de Ti" (2000)

Music video
- "Cuando" on YouTube

"Cuando" (English: "When") is a song written and performed by Guatemalan singer-songwriter Ricardo Arjona for his eighth studio album, Galería Caribe (2000). It was released as the album's lead single in 2000. It became his second number-one song on both the Billboard Hot Latin Songs and Latin Pop Airplay charts in the United States. A pop version was also recorded for the album as well as a Portuguese-language version titled "Quando". The song was inspired by an Internet chat Arjona had with a woman. Michael Paloetta of Billboard magazine called it "dreamy". The music video for the song was filmed in Barcelona, Spain and directed by Pedro Aznar.

== Charts ==
=== Weekly charts ===
Chart (2000)	Peak position
US Hot Latin Songs (Billboard)	1
US Latin Pop Airplay (Billboard)	1

=== Yearly charts ===
Chart (2000)	Position
US Hot Latin Songs (Billboard)	29

== See also ==
- List of number-one Billboard Hot Latin Tracks of 2000
- List of Billboard Latin Pop Airplay number ones of 2000
