= Dónde Está el Amor (Charlie Zaa song) =

Single by Charlie Zaa

from the album Ciego de Amor
- Released: 17 January 2000
- Genre: Bolero
- Length: 3:17
- Label: Sony Discos / Sonolux
- Songwriter(s): Randall Barlow; Roberto Blades
- Producer(s): Roberto Blades; Emilio Estefan, Jr.; José Antonio Molina; Juan Vincente Zambrano

Charlie Zaa singles chronology
"Amores" (1999)	"Dónde Está el Amor" (2000)	"Por Tu Amor" (2000)

Music video
- "Donde Está el Amor" on YouTube

"'Dónde Está el Amor" ("Where is the Love") is a song written by Randall Barlow and Roberto Blades and performed by Colombian singer Charlie Zaa for his third studio album, Ciego de Amor (2000). It was released as the lead single from the album on 17 January 2000. It became his first number one song on the Billboard Latin Pop Airplay chart in the United States. The music video was directed by Oscar Azula and filmed in La Guajira, Colombia. It was recognized as one of the best-performing Latin songs of the year at the 2001 BMI Latin Awards. The Newsday Richard Torres stated that the artist "invests such top-notch love ballads" citing the song and "Me Engañaste" with "an impressive tenderness" Billboard critic Michael Paoletta was unimpressed, calling both the song and "Porque Te Vuelvo A Amar" "sleepy entries". Deborah Davis of Reforma referred to as one of the album's "slow neobolero" songs.

== Charts ==
=== Weekly charts ===
Chart (2000)	Peak position
US Hot Latin Songs (Billboard)	2
US Latin Pop Airplay (Billboard)	1
US Tropical Airplay (Billboard)	3

=== Yearly charts ===
Chart (2000)	Position
US Hot Latin Songs (Billboard)	37

== See also ==
- List of Billboard Latin Pop Airplay number ones of 2000
