= Roberto Kolb Neuhaus =

Mexican musicologist and oboist

Roberto Kolb Neuhaus (1951, Mexico) is a Mexican musicologist and oboist of Austrian origin. He is widely known for his researches of Mexican composer Silvestre Revueltas. He has written many books and essays about the composer published in Mexico, United States, Vienna, and Berlin. He has been invited to musical congresses worldwide. In 1998 he published the first complete catalogue of Revueltas's works. He is the leading authority on Revueltas music.

He studied at the Conservatory of The Hague where he obtained a degree in oboe and a special degree in English horn. He has also studied baroque oboe, composition and sociology of music. He received a Ph.D. in History of Art from National Autonomous University of Mexico UNAM. For 15 years he played the oboe and English horn in the Filarmonica de la Ciudad de Mexico and in Filarmonica de la UNAM. He is founder and artistic director of Camerata de las Americas. Since 1994 he has been a teacher and researcher at the Escuela Nacional de Musica (UNAM). Recently he collaborated with the Orquesta Sinfónica de Guanajuato in the first world recording of Revueltas's orchestral work Esquinas in its two versions.

== Works ==
- Kolb Neuhaus, Roberto. 1998. Manual para la construcción de cañas para oboes. ISBN 968-36-6358-3.
- Kolb Neuhaus, Roberto. 1998. Silvestre Revueltas. Catálogo de sus obras. Coyoacán, DF. Universidad Nacional Autonóma de México. Escuela Nacional del Música. ISBN 9683669093.
