= Los Genios Musicales =

Studio album by DJ Joe y Trebol Clan
- Released: November 1, 2000
- Recorded: 1999–2000
- Genre: Reggaeton
- Label: Geniux Productions
- Producer: DJ Joe

DJ Joe y Trebol Clan chronology
Los Genios Musicales (2000)	Los Bacatranes (2004)

Singles from Los Genios Musicales
- 1. "Acérquense Mujeres Al Baile" Released: 2000; 2. "Vengan Al Baile" Released: 2000

Los Genios Musicales is the collaborative album by DJ Joe y Trebol Clan. It was released on November 1, 2000.

== Track listing ==
1. Introducción
2. Acérquense Mujeres Al Baile
3. Ahora Es El Tiempo
4. Quítense
5. Entre Reyes
6. Sexo Quieren Tener (feat. Great Kilo, Speedy & The Panic)
7. Vengan Al Baile
8. Suenen Los Rifles
9. Trebol Clan Los Matará
10. No Se Asombren
11. Para
