= Grupo Exterminador =

Mexican norteño band

- Origin: Guanajuato, Mexico / Los Angeles, United States
- Genres: Pacific Norteño
- Years active: 1992–present
- Labels: EGO Records (only 1994); Fonovisa (1995-2009); Skalona Records (2010–)
- Members: Juan Corona; Gustavo Pardo; Bernardo Corona; José Corona; Jesús Corona; Gerardo Corona

Grupo Exterminador, (formerly known as Los Hermanos Corona in 1991–1992) is a Mexican norteño band. Though known for performing various song styles such as rancheras, cumbias, and ballads, they are especially famous for their brash narcocorridos.

== History ==
Grupo Exterminador started in 1992. The band's debut album, Dos Plebes II, was released by EGO Records in 1994. Their biggest chart hit was when their album Nuestras Romanticas reached no.9 on the Billboard charts in 2007, and as of December 2023 their song "El Padre De Todos" has over 32.2 million views on YouTube.

== Discography ==
- Corral de Piedra (Los Hermanos Corona 1991)
- El Tordillo (Los Hermanos Corona 1992)
- El Halcón Traficante (Los Hermanos Corona 1993)
- Dos Plebes II (1994; first Album and only on EGO Records)
- Me Gusta Ponerle al Polvo (1995; first album on Fonovisa)
- Dedicado a Mis Novias (1996)
- Corridos Perrones 1 (1996)
- Narco Corridos 2 (1997)
- El Chile Pelaiz (1997)
- Contrabando en los Huevos (1999)
- Los Corridos Más Torones (2000)
- La Pedrada (2000)
- Reunión de Perrones (2001)
- A Calzón Quitado (2002)
- Narco Corridos Vol.3 De parranda con el Diablo (2003)
- El Hijo de México (2005)
- Ahora con los Huevos en la Mano (2006)
- Adicto a Ti (2007)
- Duelo de Valientes:Corridos endiablados (2008; last album officially on Fonovisa)
- La Fiesta (2010; first album on Skalona Records)
- El Punto Exacto (2012; album with Banda music)
- Pachangón en el Infierno (2013)
- Es Tiempo de Exterminador (2014-2015)
- Las Más Perronas (2024)

== Sencillos ==
- Nos Tienen Envidia (1987)
- El Corrido de la Chonta (2001) Del álbum "primer amor a mil x hora" de banda Sonora
- Cruz de Marihuana (2012)
- Cantinas De Guanajuato (2015) Con Lázaro Ramírez
- Reparar Tú Corazón (2016)
- Orgullo Guanajuatense (2016) Con Mariachi
- Liberal (2017)
- Tumba en mi Pecho (2017)
- El Hueso (2018)
- La Caída de los Pinos (2018)
- La Venganza del Chapo (2018)
- Los Dos Cabrones (2019) Con Los Originales de San Juan
- Chiquita (2019)
- El Corrido del Canelo (2019)
- La Venganza del Viejito (2019)
- Pasará (2019)
- La Llamada (2020)
- Por las Calles de Chicago (2020)
- Mi Viejo de Rancho (2020)
- Nos Tienen Envidia "Extendida" (2020)
- Tu Eterno Enamorado (2021)
- El Chimuelo (2021)
- El Prieto de Dallas (2021)
- Aunque No Lo Mereces (2021)
- El Más Buscado (2022)
- Por Lastimar a Este C@bron (2022)
- Corrido a Jaime Serrano (2022)
- El Mudo Se la Sacó (2023)
- Medellín, Tierra de Grandes (2023)
- Locos (2023) Con Moly "La Patrona"
- Te Sigo Amando (2023)
- Me Gusta Ponerle al Polvo "Guaracha" (2023)
- Las Monjitas "Guaracha" (2023)
- Las Monjitas (1996)
- Deberia de Olvidarte (2024)
- Mi Viejo (2024)
- Que Anda Haciendo el Viejón (2024)
- Mi Amigo Jesús (2024)
- Un Grande en la Grande (2024)
- Los Chingones del Corrido (2024) Con El Compa Sacra "El Último Razo"
- Dos hijos de la Ching@d@ (2024) Con El Compa Sacra "El Último Razo"
- El Regreso de las Monjitas (2024)
- Jesús, Regalo de Dios (2024)
- Bukele (2025)
