= Son by Four (album) =

Studio album by Son by Four
- Released: February 1, 2000
- Recorded: 1999
- Studio: Pentagrama Sound; Arts Studios; Powerlight Studios, San Juan, Puerto Rico; Extreme Music, Miami; The War Room, Newark, New Jersey
- Genre: Latin pop; salsa; tropical; bolero; Latin
- Length: 61:44
- Label: Sony Discos
- Producer: Omar Alfanno; Alejandro Jaén; Sergio George; Byron

Son by Four chronology
Prepárense (1998)	Son by Four (2000)	Purest of Pain (2000)

Singles from Son by Four
- 1. "A Puro Dolor" Released: November 29, 2000; 2. "Dónde Está Tu Amor" Released: May 8, 2001

Professional ratings
Review scores
Source	Rating
AllMusic	4.5/5 stars

Son by Four is the second studio album recorded by Puerto Rican-American band Son by Four. It was released by Sony Music Latin on February 1, 2000. This album received a nomination for a Grammy Award for Best Salsa Album in the 43rd Annual Grammy Awards on February 21, 2001, and also became their first number-one album on the Billboard Top Latin Albums chart. The first single, "A Puro Dolor", was nominated for a Latin Grammy Award for Best Tropical Song in the 1st Annual Latin Grammy Awards on September 13, 2000.

== Track listing ==
The track listing from Billboard.

1. "A Puro Dolor" (Omar Alfanno) – 4:23
2. "Pero Eres Tú" (Pedro Quiles) – 4:15
3. "Sofia" (Omar Alfanno, Ángel López) – 4:20
4. "Poca Mujer" (Jorge Montes) – 4:31
5. "Qué Está Pasando" (Omar Alfanno) – 4:08
6. "Mi Corazón Te Recuerda" – 5:06
7. "Dónde Está Tu Amor" (Alejandro Jaén) – 4:38
8. "Lo Qué Yo Más Quiero" (Omar Alfanno) – 4:55
9. "Cómo Decírselo" (Jorge Montes) – 4:08
10. "Lo Que Yo No Tengo" (Mickey Perfecto) – 5:03
11. "Muévelo" (Ángel López) – 3:33
12. "Lunática" (Sonny Hernández) – 5:06
13. "A Puro Dolor" (Ballad version) (Omar Alfanno) – 3:33
14. "Sofía" (Remix) (Omar Alfanno, Ángel López) – 4:38
15. "Purest of Pain" (bonus track)

== Chart performance ==
Chart (2000)	Peak position
Colombian Albums (ASINCOL)	1
Mexican Albums (AMPROFON)	2
US Billboard 200	94
US Top Latin Albums (Billboard)	1
US Tropical Albums (Billboard)	1

== Sales and certifications ==
Region	Certification	Certified units/sales
Argentina (CAPIF)	Gold	30,000^{^}
Mexico (AMPROFON)	Gold	85,000
United States (RIAA)	Gold	500,000^{^}
^{^} Shipments figures based on certification alone.

== See also ==
- List of number-one Billboard Top Latin Albums of 2000
- List of number-one Billboard Tropical Albums from the 2000s

== Personnel ==
This information from Allmusic.

- Caferino Caban – arranger
- Roberto Calderón – sax (baritone)
- José David Carrión – piano
- Mario De Jesús – engineer, mixing
- DJ Lucho – mixing
- Danny Fuentes – trombone
- Jose Gazmey – bass
- Gustavo López – trumpet
- Héctor David Marcano – timbales
- J. Salazar – arranger
- Son by Four – vocals
- Ronnie Torres – engineer
- Eliud Velázquez – banjo, percussion, congas
- Alejandro López – art director
