= Omar Alfanno =

Panamanian singer-songwriter

Background information
- Born: Omar Enrique Alfanno Velásquez
- Occupations: Composer and producer
- Years active: 1987–present

Omar Enrique Alfanno Velásquez is a Panamanian singer-songwriter of Latin music who is most active in the salsa and merengue genres.

Reuters noted him as "one of Latin music's premiere songwriters and the man behind countless hits".

He has composed for musicians like Tony Vega, Luis Enrique, Melina Leon, Jerry Rivera, Victor Manuelle, Gilberto Santa Rosa, and Marc Anthony. His most successful song, "A Puro Dolor" performed by the Son by Four, reached the Billboard Hot 100. The song was awarded a Lo Nuestro Award, a Billboard Music Award, and a Latin Grammy Award nomination in 2000. His song "Amores Como el Nuestro" — written for Jerry Rivera — was sampled by Wyclef Jean in the 2004 song "Dance Like This" which was later used for the 2006 Shakira hit "Hips Don't Lie". "Amores Como el Nuestro" was also sampled by Lord Tariq and Peter Gunz in the 1998 song "Deja Vu (Uptown Baby)".

In April 2013, he performed with many of his collaborators at a concert in Panama.

== Life ==
Alfanno was born January 4, 1957, in Santiago de Veraguas, Panama, and lives in Panama City today. He studied to be a dental surgeon in Mexico but his true passion was music. Once he graduated, he pursued a career as a singer making his professional debut in 1987 with the prestigious company RCA Records. His first album in the salsa genre was titled Cosas de Barrio. The next year he moved to Puerto Rico where he made the productions Joe de Barrio and Cuerpos al Calor. In 1990, he signed a contract with CBS, where he recorded En Torno Al Amor, his fourth and last album in his short but blooming career as a singer. His career as a composer started right there in Puerto Rico where artists such as Willie Colon, Gilberto Santa Rosa, Tony Vega, Luis Enrique, and Jerry Rivera recorded songs by Alfanno which marked his career as a composer. He moved to Miami in 1993 where he decided to internationalize his music. A year later, he worked with Marc Anthony, where he recorded three songs for the album Todo A Su Tiempo. After that, his career took off and he composed many hit songs. He also worked with Víctor Manuelle. Alfanno's success is credited with 16 gold records, 39 platinum discs which includes 9 double platinum, 4 triple platinum, 1 quadruple platinum and 3 quintuple platinum. He continues to compose with many other artists and continues to win awards that recognize his huge talent and success as a composer. Today, he is married to Carmen Alfanno and they have three children: Giancarlo, Gianna and Giovanna.

At the 27th Annual Latin Grammy Awards, Alfanno received the Trustees Award for his contributions to Latin music.

== Discography ==
- Cosas de Barrio (1987)
- Cuerpos al Calor (1988)
- En Torno al Amor (1991)
- Joe de Barrio

== Awards and nominations ==
=== American Society of Composers, Authors and Publishers Awards ===
Alfanno has won the following ASCAP awards.

Year	Nominee / work	Award	Result
1994	Himself	Songwriters of the Year	Won
1994	"Que Hay de Malo"	Tropical Songs	Won
1994	"Sin Voluntad"	Tropical Songs	Won
1995	Himself	Songwriter of the Year - Tropical	Won
1995	"Que Hay de Malo"	Tropical Songs	Won
1995	"Ella Es"	Tropical Songs	Won
1996	"Te Conozco Bien"	Tropical Songs	Won
1996	"Si Tú Supieras"	Tropical Songs	Won
2000	"Qué Habría Sido de Mi"	Salsa Songs	Won
2000	"No Sabes Como Duele"	Salsa Songs	Won
2001	Himself	Composer of the Year	Won
2001	"A Puro Dolor"	Song of the Year	Won
2001	"A Puro Dolor"	Pop/Balada Song of the Year	Won
2001	"Que Alguien Me Diga"	Salsa Song of the Year	Won
2001	"Que Alguien Me Diga"	Pop/Balada Songs	Won
2001	"Si la Ves"	Salsa Songs	Won
2001	"Cuando Una Mujer"	Pop/Balada Songs	Won
2001	"Cuando Una Mujer"	Merengue Song of the Year	Won
2002	Himself	Composers of the Year	Won
2002	"Me Da lo Mismo"	Salsa Songs	Won
2002	"Pueden Decir"	Salsa Songs	Won
2002	"Pueden Decir"	Pop/Balada Songs	Won
2002	"Cuando Seas Mía (Miss Me So Bad)"	Pop/Balada Songs	Won
2003	"En Nombre de los Dos"	Tropical Songs	Won
2004	"En Nombre de los Dos"	Tropical Songs	Won
2007	"Hips Don't Lie"	Pop/Ballad Songs	Won
2009	"No Te Vayas"	Tropical Songs	Won

=== Billboard Latin Music Awards ===
Alfanno has received the following Billboard Latin Music Awards and nominations.

Year	Nominee / work	Award	Result
1999	Himself	Songwriter of the Year	Nominated
2002	Himself	Songwriter of the Year	Nominated

=== Latin Grammy Awards ===
Alfanno has received the following Latin Grammy awards and nominations.

Year	Nominee / work	Award	Result
2000	"A Puro Dolor"	Best Tropical Song	Nominated
2002	"Pueden Decir"	Best Tropical Song	Nominated
2016	"Vine A Buscarte"	Best Tropical Song	Won
2026	Himself	Trustees Award	Won
