= Morir de Amor (album) =

Studio album by Conjunto Primavera
- Released: 2000
- Recorded: 1999
- Genre: Norteño-sax
- Label: Fonovisa

Conjunto Primavera chronology
Recado (2000)	Morir de Amor (2000)	El Recado del Amor (2001)

Morir de Amor (Eng.: Dying of Love) is a studio album by Mexican norteño-sax band Conjunto Primavera released in 2000. This album received a nomination for a Latin Grammy Award for Best Grupero Performance, which was awarded to En La Madrugada se Fue by Los Temerarios, and became their first number-one album in the Billboard Top Latin Albums chart.

Technically, this album is of re-recordings, except for “Morir de Amor” and “Mexico Ra, Ra, Ra”. Also, the album consists entirely of ballads; all with keyboard with the exception of “Mexico Ra, Ra, Ra”, because the song has accordion instead of the keyboard.

The re-recordings are:

Enamorado de Ti of Vas a Conseguir from 1991,
Jugando al Amor of Me Nortie from 1993,
Dime, Dime, Dime of Me Voy, Me Voy from 1989,
Maldita Seas (previously only titled Maldita) of Cumbias y Rancheras from 1985,
Y Otra Vez of the album with the same name from 1992,
No Cómo Amigo of Lo Mejor, Lo Ultimo from 1991,
Cinco Lagrimas of Con las Manos Vacías from 1990,
and En Cada Gota de Mi Sangre of La Otra from 1986.

== Track listing ==
All songs were written by Oscar Ochoa, except where noted.

1. Morir de Amor (Ramón González) – 3:04
2. Enamorado de Tí – 3:20
3. Jugando al Amor – 3:06
4. Dime, Dime, Dime – 3:13
5. Maldita Seas (Luis Raúl Alcántara) – 5:29
6. Y Otra Vez – 3:42
7. No Como Amigo – 2:50
8. Cinco Lagrimas – 4:16
9. En Cada Gota de Mi Sangre (José De Jésus Pineda Ramos) – 3:23
10. México Ra, Ra, Ra (Jesse Armenta) – 4:02

== Chart performance ==
Chart (2000)	Peak position
US Billboard Top Latin Albums	1
US Billboard Regional Mexican Albums	1
US Billboard 200	153

== Sales and certifications ==
Region	Certification	Certified units/sales
Mexico (AMPROFON)	Gold	75,000^{^}
United States (RIAA)	Gold	500,000^{^}
^{^} Shipments figures based on certification alone.

== Personnel ==
This information from Allmusic.

- Mario Alanis: Mastering, Mixing engineer
- Tony Gonzalez: Engineer
- Jesús Guillén: Executive producer
- Víctor Manuel Mata: Art direction
