= En la Madrugada Se Fue =

En La Madrugada se Fue

Studio album by Los Temerarios
- Released: February 29, 2000
- Recorded: 1999
- Genre: Grupera
- Label: Fonovisa

Los Temerarios chronology
Como Te Recuerdo (1998)	En La Madrugada se Fue (2000)	Joyas (2001)

En La Madrugada se Fue (Eng.: Left in the Morning) is a studio album released in 2000 by the romantic music band Los Temerarios. This album was awarded with a Latin Grammy Award for Best Grupero Performance, and became their first number-one album in the Billboard Top Latin Albums chart. This album also is received a double-platinum certification in Mexico with sales of 300,000 units.

== Track listing ==
1. Te Hice Mal — 4:40 Adolfo Angel
2. Dicen Que la Distancia — 4:17 Adolfo Angel
3. Eras Todo Para Mi — 4:49 Adolfo Angel
4. Adios Te Extrañaré (Mariachi version) — 4:56 Adolfo Angel
5. En la Madrugada Se Fue — 3:47 Adolfo Angel
6. Adiós Te Extrañaré (Demo version) — 5:37 Adolfo Angel
7. He Intentado Tanto, Tanto — 3:48 Gustavo Angel
8. Quise Olvidarme de Ti — 3:54 Adolfo Angel
9. No Es Tan Fácil Olvidarme — 4:42 Adolfo Angel
10. Sufriendo Penas — 4:17 Adolfo Angel
11. Me Extrañarás — 4:40 Adolfo Angel
12. Adiós Te Extrañaré (Pop version) — 5:12 Adolfo Angel
13. Te Hice Mal (Demo version) — 6:50 Adolfo Angel

== Personnel ==
This information from Allmusic.

- Adolfo Ángel Alba: Bass, arranger, keyboards, vocals, concept, music coordinator
- Gustavo Ángel Alba: Guitar
- Mayra Angelica Alba: Production coordination
- Homero Patron: strings, arranger, concept, metal objects
- Carlos Abrego: percussion
- Sergio Aranda: Background vocals
- Eduardo Arias: Stylist
- Harry King: Bass
- Bernardino De Santiago: Bass
- Fernando de Santiago Bass
- Jorge Escobar: Arranger
- Bernie Grundman: Mastering
- Gabriel Martínez: Mixing
- Joel Numa: Engineer, mixing
- Luis Vega: Mixing
- Karlo Vidal: drums
- Santiago Yturria: Photography, vocal director
- Guillermo Anaya: Photography

== Chart performance ==
Chart (2000)	Peak position
US Billboard Top Latin Albums	1
US Billboard Regional/Mexican Albums	1
US Billboard 200	75

== Sales and certifications ==
Region	Certification	Certified units/sales
Mexico (AMPROFON)	2× Platinum	300,000^{^}
United States (RIAA)	Platinum	1,000,000^{^}
^{^} Shipments figures based on certification alone.

== See also ==
- List of number-one Billboard Top Latin Albums of 2000
