= A Puro Dolor =

2000 single by Son by Four

Single by Son by Four

from the album Son by Four
- Released: 2000
- Recorded: 1999
- Genre: Latin pop; salsa
- Length: 3:32 (ballad version); 4:23 (original version)
- Label: Sony Discos
- Songwriter: Omar Alfanno
- Producers: Oscar Llord; Alejandro Jaen; Omar Alfanno

Son by Four singles chronology
"No Hay Razón" (1998)	"A Puro Dolor" (2000)	"Miss Me So Bad" (2000)

"A Puro Dolor" is a song recorded by Puerto Rican band Son by Four. It was written by Omar Alfanno and released as the first single of the second studio album of the band in 2000. Two versions of the track were produced by Oscar Llord for the album; one as a salsa and the other as a ballad. The ballad version was arranged by Alejandro Jaén.

The song reached number-one on Billboard Top Latin Songs chart, and became the longest running chart topper of its history, spending 20 weeks at the top; this record was broken five years later by Colombian singer Shakira with "La Tortura" which spent 25 weeks at number-one. "A Puro Dolor" also reached the Billboard 100; this led to the recording of an English-language version of the track "Purest of Pain", which was also charted in the United States.

The composition also met with critical acclaim receiving the Lo Nuestro Award, the Billboard Music Award and a Latin Grammy Award nomination. In 2009, "A Puro Dolor" was named the best-performing Latin single of the 2000s decade in the United States. Two music videos were made for the ballad and the English versions. The record was covered by Mexican group Dinora y la Juventud and Brazilian boy band KLB both of which received radio airplay.

== Background and composition ==
I wrote it in ten minutes, under deadline, with a bottle of water by my side.

— Omar Alfanno, Billboard.

In 1998, Son by Four released their first album, Prepárense. The success of the singles "Nada" and "No Hay Razón", distributed in Puerto Rico by the independent label RJO, captured the attention of the Sony Music CEO Oscar Llord, who made an agreement with RJO to re-release the album and start the recording sessions of the next album. Llord was the brain child behind the ballad version, which was recorded at his own Extreme Studios in Miami, FL, which was the version that went on to #1. The first single taken from the following album was "A Puro Dolor", written and arranged by Panamanian record producer Omar Alfanno, with a ballad version arranged by Alejandro Jaén. Alfanno, well known for his work with salsa recording singers Marc Anthony, Víctor Manuelle, Jerry Rivera and Gilberto Santa Rosa was in charge of the album production. Alfanno declared that he wrote the song in ten minutes, and that after the success of the track, he analyzed the composition, since he did not understand how "A Puro Dolor" became that popular. He named it "the Cinderella of all his songs." After its success in the Latin market, Oscar Llord then engineered an English version of the song “Purest of Pain”, which went on to become a Billboard Top 40 hit, and performed alongside N’Sync at the 2001 Latin Grammy Awards.

== Critical reception ==
Son by Four "Purest of Pain"
A 21 second sample of the song, "Purest of Pain", the English version of "A Puro Dolor" by Son by Four. This version was recorded after the group's unexpected success with the original song.

The song was released in 2000. It became very successful with the ballad and tropical and salsa versions setting an airplay record for a Latin single with 23.4 million impressions in those countries. The reaction to the song was intense, and Son by Four was asked to record an English-language version of the track. This version, titled "Purest of Pain", was serviced to English-speaking radio stations in May 2001. The success of the song took by surprise the leader of the band, Ángel López, who told Billboard magazine: "When they told us we were going to be signed by Columbia for the single, we flipped." A ranchera version was also recorded for the Regional Mexican audience. About the song, López also declared that "has something everybody can relate to. We're adults, we've been all through that [rejection]. The way the song reaches out to people is outstanding." In his album review for AllMusic, Evan C. Gutierrez declared that "A Puro Dolor" set "an impossibly high standard for the rest of the playlist."

Son by Four received seven Billboard Latin Music Award nominations in 2001 for "Hot Latin Track of the Year", "Pop Track of the Year" and "Tropical/Salsa Track of the Year" ("A Puro Dolor"); "Tropical/Salsa Album of the Year, New Artist" and "Tropical/Salsa Album of the Year, Group" (Son by Four); and "Billboard Latin 50 Artist of the Year" and "Hot Latin Track Artist of the Year". With further nominations for Alfanno as "Songwriter of the Year" and Jaén for "Producer of the Year". Son by Four won all the awards, and Alfanno won the award for the writing of the song.

At the Lo Nuestro Awards of 2001, the group earned six awards; among them "Pop Song of the Year" and "Tropical Song of the Year". Alfanno also received a Latin Grammy Award nomination for the Best Tropical Song, which it lost to "El Niágara en Bicicleta" by Juan Luis Guerra. "A Puro Dolor" was given three Billboard Music Award in 2000 for Latin Track of the Year, Latin Pop Track of the Year, and Tropical/Salsa Track of the Year. At the 2001 ASCAP Latin Music Awards, Alfanno was awarded "Song of the Year" and "Pop/Balada Song of the Year" for his composition of the song and was named Songwriter of the Year. In 2015, "A Puro Dolor" ranked number 35 on Billboard's Best Latin Songs of All Time.

== Promotion ==
To promote the single, Son by Four opened a Ricky Martin live performance in the Madison Square Garden in New York City. They also did a concert with the R&B trio Destiny's Child, and were presented in the 1st Latin Grammy Awards along with the boy band NSYNC, performing the medley "A Puro Dolor"/"Purest of Pain" with "This I Promise You"/"Yo Te Voy a Amar". The song was featured in the Mexican telenovela Frente al Espejo, broadcast by Televisa. that year, it served as an opening theme for yet another telenovela "mis 3 hermanas from Venezuela. In 2000, due to the success of the track in the American market, they were asked to perform on The Tonight Show hosted by Jay Leno. The salsa version of the song was included on their greatest hits album Salsa Hits (2001) and Lo Esencial (2008) and on the compilation album Salsahits 2001 (2000).

Two music videos were made for the song; the first one for the ballad version, and the other for the English version. The ballad version was directed by Felipe Niño. In the video, the group is shown performing the song along with an orchestra behind them. It is filmed on a stage where shows López singing his verses, while the others members of the group, follow up with the chorus. At the end of the video the people of the orchestra starts to applaud when the group ends to sing. In the English version of the video, the plot is completely different. The video starts in a cloudy afternoon after a storm, where the group is situated in a white room. It shows López singing in a ladder when it later starts to fill with water. At the last part of the video, it shows Son by Four singing out of the house after the storm has ended.

== Chart performance ==
"A Puro Dolor" reached the top spot of the Billboard Top Latin Songs, Latin Pop Songs and Tropical/Salsa charts with the song spending 20 weeks at number-one on the former chart. This chart run led the song to be named the best-performing Latin single of the 2000s decade. At the time, in the aforementioned chart, only four songs have had similar week runs at the top: "Me Enamora" by Juanes, "Te Quiero" by Flex, and "Bailando" by Enrique Iglesias featuring Descemer Bueno and Gente De Zona with 20 weeks each, and "La Tortura" by Shakira featuring Alejandro Sanz with 25 non-consecutive weeks at the top. "Purest of Pain", the English version of the track, peaked at number twenty-six in the Billboard Hot 100 chart and ranked 61 at the Billboard Year-End Hot 100 singles of 2000. This exposure led to the parent album to receive a Gold certification in Argentina, Mexico, and the United States. "A Puro Dolor" ranked first at the Hot Latin Songs 25th Anniversary chart. "Purest of Pain" was also a modest success in Europe where it peaked at number seven and eighteen in the Flanders and Wallonia regions of Belgium and number three in the Netherlands.

== Formats and track listings ==
CD maxi single
No.	Title	Length
1.	"Purest of Pain (A Puro Dolor) [Spanglish]"	3:30
2.	"Purest of Pain (A Puro Dolor) [Bilingual]"	3:30
3.	"Purest of Pain (A Puro Dolor) [Living without you]"	3:30

== Charts ==
=== Weekly charts ===
Chart performance for "A Puro Dolor"
Chart (2000–2001)	Peak position
Chile (IFPI)	10
Colombia (ASINCOL)	7
Costa Rica (Notimex)	1
Dominican Republic (Notimex)	1
Ecuador (Notimex)	1
El Salvador (Notimex)	4
Guatemala (Notimex)	4
Honduras (Notimex)	7
Nicaragua (Notimex)	1
Panama (Notimex)	1
US Hot Latin Songs (Billboard)	1
US Latin Pop Airplay (Billboard)	1
US Tropical Airplay (Billboard)	1
Venezuela (IFPI)	3

Chart performance for "Purest of Pain"
Chart (2000–2001)	Peak position
Belgium (Ultratip Bubbling Under Flanders)	7
Belgium (Ultratip Bubbling Under Wallonia)	18
Netherlands (Dutch Top 40)	5
Netherlands (Single Top 100)	3
US Billboard Hot 100	26
US Rhythmic Airplay (Billboard)	21

=== Year-end charts ===
Chart (2000)	Position
US Billboard Hot 100 "Purest of Pain", English version	61
US Hot Latin Songs (Billboard)	1
US Latin Pop Songs (Billboard)	1
US Tropical Songs (Billboard)	1

Chart (2001)	Position
Netherlands (Dutch Top 40)	36
Netherlands (Single Top 100)	20
US Hot Latin Songs (Billboard)	17
US Latin Pop Songs (Billboard)	10

=== Decade-end charts ===
Decade-end chart performance for "A Puro Dolor"
Chart (2000–09)	Position
Netherlands (Single Top 100)	95
US Hot Latin Songs (Billboard)	1
US Latin Pop Airplay (Billboard)	3

=== All-time charts ===
Chart (2017)	Position
US Latin Pop Airplay (Billboard)	6
US Tropical Airplay (Billboard)	19
Chart (2021)	Position
US Hot Latin Songs (Billboard)	3

== Credits and personnel ==
The credits are adapted from the Son by Four liner notes.

- Oscar Llord – executive producer
- Omar Alfanno – songwriting, production
- Ángel López – lead vocals
- Son by Four – chorus
- Erika Ender – songwriting ("Purest of Pain")
- M. Llord – songwriting ("Purest of Pain")

Ballad version

- J. Salazar – arranging
- R. Bravo – drum kit, percussion
- L. Quintero – acoustic guitar, electric guitar
- Miami Symphonic Services – string arrangement
- A. Oliva – string coordinator
- Richie Perez – engineering

Richie Perez - Mixing

- Alejandro Jaén – co-production, direction
- Lewis Martineé – vocal production, mixing ("Purest of Pain")

Salsa version

- Ceferino Caban – arrangement
- Jose David Carrion – piano
- Jose Gazmey – bass guitar
- David Marcano – timbales
- Eluid Velazquez – conga, bongos
- Gustavo Lopez – trumpet
- Danny Fuentes – trombone

== Other recordings ==
In 2000, Mexican group Dinora y la Juventud performed a cover "A Puro Dolor" in cumbia music. Their version peaked at number forty-six on the Hot Latin Songs chart and number fifteen on the Billboard Regional Mexican Songs chart. The success of their cover led to the group receiving a Lo Nuestro Award for New Regional Mexican Artist of the Year. A music video for the song was filmed for the group.

In 2001, Chinese Pop singer Coco Lee recorded a Mandarin Chinese cover titled Baby,I'm Sorry (Baby 對不起) as the lead single of her album Promise CoCo released that year. Her version's lyrics were co-written by Lee along with Lou Nanwei while the music is still the same original composition by Alfanno. A music video was released on the same year by Sony Music Entertainment Her version placed at number 35 on the Taiwan Yearly Singles Top 100 chart in 2001.

In 2002, Malaysian pop group Phyne Ballerz recorded a Malay cover titled "VIDA" under KRU Records label; as their second single. The Malay version is co-written by Ajai and Norman Abdul Halim. It was compiled in their debut album "Monte Carlo" in 2002.

Piska, a Brazilian producer and composer, wrote the lyrics for a cover version of the song, which was recorded by the boy band KLB, and released in their eponymous debut album under the title "A Dor Desse Amor". It was later released as a single, and became the group's first single to play in radio stations in the country. The cover became a hit; it was the tenth most-played song in Brazilian radios in 2000. A music video, directed by Preta Gil, was filmed for KLB.

In 2009, Son by Four recorded a new version of the track for their studio album Abba Nuestro which did not have López's involvement as he left the band in 2003. López himself recorded a new version of the track on his studio album Historias de Amor (2010) which features a cover of Alfanno's other compositions which was produced by Alfanno. He also recorded it as a duet with fellow Puerto Rican singer Ana Isabelle on her studio album Mi Sueño (2010). Four lines from "A Puro Dolor" was sampled on the song "Vacío" by Luis Fonsi and Rauw Alejandro. Fonsi the song live at the 69th Miss Universe contest.

In 2024, Mexican singer Gabito Ballesteros recorded a regional Mexican version of the track from his debut album The GB (2024).

== See also ==
- Billboard Top Latin Songs Year-End Chart
- List of number-one Billboard Hot Latin Tracks of 2000
- List of Billboard Latin Pop Airplay number ones of 2000
- List of number-one Billboard Latin Tropical Airplay of 2000
