= Gisselle =

Puerto Rican merengue singer (born 1969)

- Born: Gisselle Ortiz Cáceres; March 28, 1969 (age 56)
- Origin: New York, New York, U.S.
- Genres: Merengue
- Occupation: Musician
- Years active: 1987–present

Gisselle Ortiz Cáceres (born March 28, 1969 in New York City, U.S.), known mononymously as Gisselle, is an American merengue singer of Puerto Rican descent.

== Biography ==
=== Musical career ===
Gisselle was born in New York City to Puerto Rican parents. She showed interest in the arts from an early age and started dancing at the Ita Medina Academy when she was 15 years old. She participated as a dancer in several shows in venues like the Luis A. Ferré Performing Arts Center. After that she became a regular dancer and performer in variety shows like Super Sábados and El Show de las 12.

It was then that she started to incline towards a career in music. She joined Kaviar, a merengue group composed of females, with whom she performed for almost two years. From 1991 to 1993, she performed with the group Punto G. After that, she decided to pursue a solo career and was signed by the BMG label.

In 1995, Bonny Cepeda produced her first album that produced several hit singles like "Perfume de mujer en tu camisa" and "Pesadilla". It was also awarded gold and platinum albums, and several awards.

In 1996, her second album - A Que Vuelve - was released to much praise. The album reached 200,000 units sold. Her third album, Quiero Estar Contigo, was equally successful reaching the top places on the Billboard charts. The album featured a version of Juan Gabriel's song Perdóname, olvídalo in a duet with Dominican Sergio Vargas which was very successful. After, they released an album together titled Juntos.

In the late 90s, Gisselle released the album Atada which garnered her a Grammy nomination. Her follow-up, Voy a Enamorarte, released in 2000, featured Gisselle singing ballads and bachatas. In 2002, she received another Grammy nomination for her album titled simply 8.

Gisselle's next album, En alma, cuerpo y corazón, featured the singer venturing into pop music. However, in 2004 she returned to merengue with her new album Contra la Marea.

=== Acting career ===
Early in her career, Gisselle was featured in several comedy sketches in programs like Esto no es un show, Mira que TVO, El Show de las 12 and No te Duermas.

In 2001, she starred in the play El bombón de Elena.

Recently, she appeared in the play La Verdadera Historia de Pedro Navaja, with Gilberto Santa Rosa and Yolandita Monge.

=== Radio host ===
In 2007, Gisselle was invited to host the morning radio show El Bayú de la Mañana at SalSoul. After a couple of months, she changed shifts hosting La Perrera at the same station. Now she has a has radio show called "El Show de Giselle y Jesse" with Jesse Calderon.

== Personal life ==
Gisselle was married in the early 1990s and has a son, Viadel, from that relationship. Viadel was born in 1994. Gisselle also has a brother named Miguel A Ortiz Caceres and lives in Hartford, CT. After her divorce she has had relationships with model and actor Julian Gil, and baseball player Roberto Alomar.

In 2009, she married minor league baseball player Miguel "Mickey" Negron. They divorced in 2021. No children were conceived from their union.
