= Son by Four =

Puerto Rican salsa band

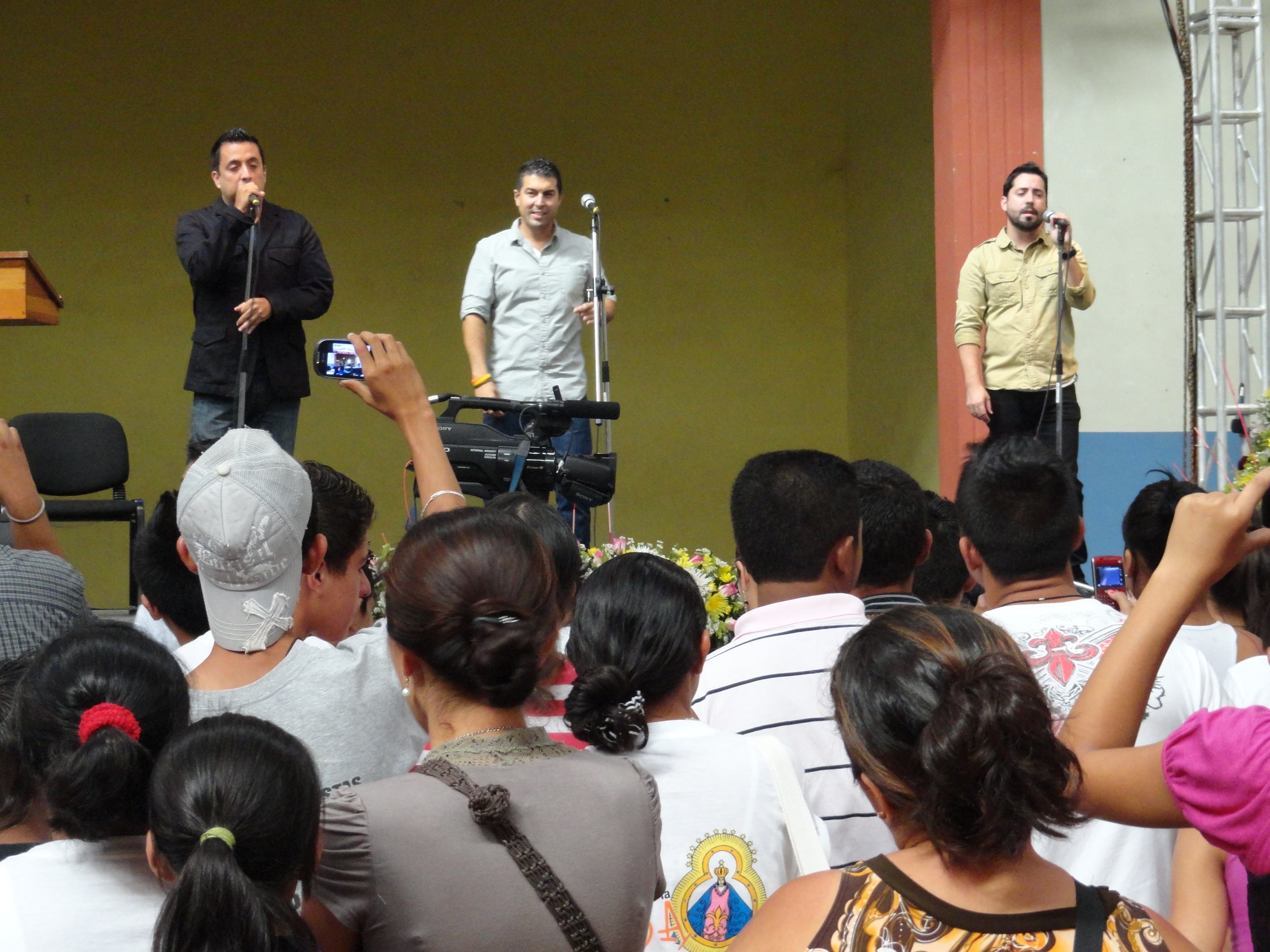
- Son by Four performing in Honduras in 2012

Background information
- Also known as: Son By 4
- Origin: Puerto Rico
- Genres: Latin pop; salsa; CCM; Catholic music
- Years active: 1997–2001; 2003–present
- Labels: Sony Discos; SB4 Music Group
- Members: Carlos Javier Montes; Jorge Montes
- Past members: Ángel López; Luis Damón; Pedro Quiles
- Website: instagram.com/sonbyfour

Son by Four is a Puerto Rican Latin music group best known for the song "A Puro Dolor" and its English-language version, "Purest of Pain". The group was formed in Puerto Rico in the late 1990s and was created by Panamanian producer and songwriter Omar Alfanno with members Ángel López, Pedro Quiles, Carlos Javier Montes and Jorge Montes.

The group first recorded Latin pop and salsa music and achieved its commercial breakthrough in 2000 with "A Puro Dolor", which spent 20 weeks at number one on the Billboard Hot Latin Songs chart. The song ranked first on Billboard's decade-end Latin Songs chart for the 2000s. After returning as an independent act, Son by Four founded SB4 Music Group in 2003 and later shifted toward Catholic music.

== History ==
=== Formation and early recordings ===
Son by Four was created by Alfanno, who wrote and produced early material for the group. In 1998, the group released the songs "No Hay Razón" and "Nada", both produced by Alfanno. The songs became minor hits on the Billboard Latin Tracks chart and helped the group sign a recording contract with Sony Music.

The group released its debut album, Prepárense, in 1998. It later released the album Son by Four, which included "A Puro Dolor".

=== Commercial breakthrough ===
"A Puro Dolor" was written by Alfanno and recorded in Spanish. The song was released in ballad and tropical versions, and the ballad version was used in the Mexican telenovela La calle de las novias and the Venezuelan telenovela Mis Tres Hermanas. The single spent a year on the Billboard Latin singles chart and set a then-record by spending 20 weeks at number one on Hot Latin Songs. It also led the tropical music chart for 21 weeks.

The English-language version, "Purest of Pain", reached number 26 on the Billboard Hot 100. The group's self-titled album sold 315,000 copies in the United States and more than 1 million copies worldwide. The album also received a Grammy Award nomination for Best Salsa Album at the 43rd Annual Grammy Awards.

"A Puro Dolor" and the group's self-titled album led to several awards and nominations. Son by Four won seven awards at the 2001 Billboard Latin Music Awards, including Hot Latin Tracks Artist of the Year and Billboard Latin 50 Artist of the Year. The song won Hot Latin Song of the Year at the Billboard Latin Music Awards and later appeared on Billboard's list of the best Latin songs of all time.

Following the success of Son by Four, the group released Salsa Hits in 2001 and Renace in 2003.

=== Independent work and Catholic music ===
The group became independent and founded SB4 Music Group in 2003. By 2007, Son by Four had changed its musical direction from Latin pop, salsa and ballads to Catholic music. The lineup during the transition included Pedro Quiles and brothers Carlos Javier Montes and Jorge Montes.

Son by Four released Aquí Está el Cordero in 2007, followed by Catholic and Christian-themed albums including Música y Palabra Vol. 1, Abbanuestro, Madre Mía and Católico Soy. In 2015, the group's album Mujer Frente a la Cruz was nominated for the Latin Grammy Award for Best Christian Album (Spanish Language).

In 2022, Son by Four marked 15 years of Catholic music with XV, a compilation album of songs from that period. The group released "A Quién Iremos" as a single on May 26, 2023. It released "Al Que Tenga Oídos" in 2024 and "S O P L A" in 2025.

== Musical style ==
Son by Four began as a Latin pop and salsa group. Its best-known song, "A Puro Dolor", was recorded in Spanish as both a ballad and a tropical version, and the group later recorded an English-language version for the U.S. pop market. After 2007, the group moved toward Catholic music, releasing albums and singles with Christian and devotional themes.

== Discography ==
=== Albums ===
- Prepárense (1998)
- Son by Four (2000)
- Purest of Pain (2000)
- Salsa Hits (2001)
- Renace (2003)
- Aquí Está el Cordero (2007)
- Música y Palabra Vol. 1 (2008)
- Abbanuestro (2009)
- Madre Mía (2010)
- Católico Soy (2011)
- Mujer Frente a la Cruz (2015)
- XV (2022)

=== Singles ===
- "No Hay Razón" (1998)
- "Nada" (1998)
- "A Puro Dolor" (2000)
- "Purest of Pain" (2000)
- "Tu Voluntad" (2020)
- "Reina Inmaculada" (2021)
- "Dios Con Nosotros" (2021)
- "No Dejaste De Amarme" (2022)
- "Lo Que Has Comenzado" (2022)
- "A Quién Iremos" (2023)
- "Al Que Tenga Oídos" (2024)
- "S O P L A" (2025)
- "Seremos Santos" (2025)

== Awards and nominations ==
| Year | Award | Category | Nominee/work | Result | Ref. |
|---|---|---|---|---|---|
| 2001 | Grammy Awards | Best Salsa Album | Son by Four | Nominated | |
| 2001 | Billboard Latin Music Awards | Hot Latin Tracks Artist of the Year | Son by Four | Won | |
| 2001 | Billboard Latin Music Awards | Billboard Latin 50 Artist of the Year | Son by Four | Won | |
| 2001 | Billboard Latin Music Awards | Hot Latin Song of the Year | "A Puro Dolor" | Won | |
| 2015 | Latin Grammy Awards | Best Christian Album (Spanish Language) | Mujer Frente a la Cruz | Nominated | |
