= Oye Mi Canto!: Los Grandes Exitos =

Oye Mi Canto: Los Éxitos / Oye Mi Canto: Los Grandes Éxitos

Greatest hits album by Gloria Estefan
- Released: October 3, 2006
- Recorded: 1987–2003
- Genre: Latin pop
- Length: 73:25
- Labels: Sony BMG Norte (U.S. & Latin America); Epic / Legacy (Europe); Sony BMG Music Entertainment (Spain)
- Producer: Emilio Estefan Jr.

Gloria Estefan chronology
Amor y Suerte: Éxitos Romanticos / The Spanish Love Songs (2004)	Oye Mi Canto: Los Éxitos / Oye Mi Canto: Los Grandes Éxitos (2006)	The Very Best Of Gloria Estefan (2006)

Oye Mi Canto!: Los Éxitos (U.S. & Latin American title) / Oye Mi Canto!: Los Grandes Éxitos (European title) is the fifth compilation album released by American singer Gloria Estefan, but is the twenty-sixth album overall, released in 2006. As of July 2007 it sold 29,000 in USA.

== Track listing ==
U.S. & Latin American CD Release
No.	Title	Writer(s)	Album	Length
1.	"Mi Tierra"	Estéfano	Mi Tierra	4:38
2.	"Abriendo Puertas"	Kike Santander	Abriendo Puertas	3:52
3.	"Con Los Años Que Me Quedan"	Gloria Estefan & Emilio Estefan, Jr.	Mi Tierra	4:36
4.	"Oye Mi Canto" (Spanish Version)	Gloria Estefan, Jorge Casas & Clay Ostwald	Cuts Both Ways	4:55
5.	"Santo Santo (Duet with Só Pra Contrariar)" (Spanish Version)	Robert Blades, Angie Chirino, Emilio Estefan Jr.	Juegos De Amor	4:09
6.	"Si Voy A Perderte" (Don't Wanna Lose You)	Gloria Estefan	Cuts Both Ways	4:06
7.	"No Te Olvidaré" (Anything For You)	Gloria Estefan	Let It Loose/Anything For You	4:01
8.	"Cuba Libre" (Spanish Version)	Gloria Estefan, Emilio Estefan Jr., Kike Santander	gloria!	4:38
9.	"¡Sí Señor!..."	Juan R. Márquez	Mi Tierra	4:40
10.	"Como Me Duele Perderte"	Marco Flores	Alma Caribeña	4:28
11.	"Ayer"	Juan R. Márquez	Mi Tierra	5:17
12.	"No Me Dejes De Querer"	Emilio Estefan, Jr., Gloria Estefan, Robert Blades	Alma Caribeña	3:28
13.	"Hoy" (Salsa Mix)	Gian Marco Zigzag	Unwrapped	4:24
14.	"Oye" (Pablo Flores Spanish Remix Radio Edit)	Gloria Estefan, Emilio Estefan Jr., Randall Barlow, Angie Chirino	gloria!	4:17
15.	"Tres Deseos"	Kike Santander	Abriendo Puertas	3:32
16.	"Desde La Oscuridad" (Coming Out Of The Dark)	Gloria Estefan, Emilio Estefan, Jr. & Jon Secada	Into The Light	4:09
17.	"Tu Fotografía"	Emilio Estefan, Jr. & Gian Marco Zigzag	Unwrapped	3:48
18.	"No Pretendo"	Kike Santander	Destiny	3:47

Europe & Spain CD & CD+DVD Release
No.	Title	Writer(s)	Album	Length
1.	"Mi Tierra"	Estéfano	Mi Tierra	4:38
2.	"Abriendo Puertas"	Kike Santander	Abriendo Puertas	3:52
3.	"Con Los Años Que Me Quedan"	Gloria Estefan & Emilio Estefan, Jr.	Mi Tierra	4:36
4.	"Oye Mi Canto" (Spanish Version)	Gloria Estefan, Jorge Casas & Clay Ostwald	Cuts Both Ways	4:55
5.	"Santo Santo" (Duet with Só Pra Contrariar)" (Spanish Version)	Robert Blades, Angie Chirino, Emilio Estefan Jr.	Juegos De Amor	4:09
6.	"Si Voy A Perderte" (Don't Wanna Lose You)	Gloria Estefan	Cuts Both Ways	4:06
7.	"Corazón Prohibido" (Pablo Flores Remix)	Gloria Estefan & Kike Santander	gloria!	5:08
8.	"Cuba Libre" (Spanish Version)	Gloria Estefan, Emilio Estefan Jr., Kike Santander	gloria!	4:38
9.	"¡Sí Señor!..."	Juan R. Márquez	Mi Tierra	4:40
10.	"Como Me Duele Perderte"	Marco Flores	Alma Caribeña	4:28
11.	"Ayer"	Juan R. Márquez	Mi Tierra	5:17
12.	"No Me Dejes De Querer"	Emilio Estefan, Jr., Gloria Estefan, Robert Blades	Alma Caribeña	3:28
13.	"Hoy" (Salsa Mix)	Gian Marco Zigzag	Unwrapped	4:24
14.	"Oye" (Pablo Flores Spanish Remix Radio Edit)	Gloria Estefan, Emilio Estefan Jr., Randall Barlow, Angie Chorine	gloria!	4:17
15.	"Toda Prá Você" (Here We Are - Portuguese Version)	Gloria Estefan & Alyosio Reis	Cuts Both Ways	4:08
16.	"Montuno"	Juan R. Márquez	Mi Tierra	4:57
17.	"Tu Fotografía"	Emilio Estefan, Jr. & Gian Marco Zigzag	Unwrapped	3:48
18.	"No Pretendo"	Kike Santander	Destiny	3:47

Spanish Limited Edition Bonus DVD
No.	Title	Writer(s)	Album	Length
1.	"Mi Tierra" (Music Video)	Estéfano	Mi Tierra
2.	"Abriendo Puertas" (Music Video)	Kike Santander	Abriendo Puertas
3.	"Corazón Prohibido" (Music Video)	Gloria Estefan & Kike Santander	gloria!
4.	"Oye" (Music Video)	Gloria Estefan, Emilio Estefan Jr., Randall Barlow, Angie Chorine	gloria!
5.	"Santo Santo (Duet with Só Pra Contrariar)" (Music Video)	Robert Blades, Angie Chirino, Emilio Estefan Jr.	Juegos De Amor
6.	"Tres Deseos" (Music Video)	Kike Santander	Abriendo Puertas
7.	"No Pretendo" (Music Video - Live In Mexico City 1997)	Kike Santander	Destiny
8.	"Cuba Libre" (Live from the Especial Gloria 1998)	Gloria Estefan, Emilio Estefan Jr., Kike Santander	gloria!
9.	"No Me Dejes De Querer" (Live from Musica Si 2000)	Emilio Estefan, Jr., Gloria Estefan, Robert Blades	Alma Caribeña
10.	"Hoy" (Live from Operacion Triunfo 2003)	Gian Marco Zigzag	Unwrapped

iTunes Bonus Tracks (available in Europe)
No.	Title	Writer(s)	Album	Length
1.	"Tradición" (Pablo's Glorious Tribal Mix)	Gloria Estefan & Emilio Estefan, Jr.	Mi Tierra	6:23
2.	"Oye" (Rosabel's Cubarican Club Mix)	Gloria Estefan, Emilio Estefan, Jr., Randall Barlow, Angie Chorine	gloria!	9:58
3.	"Santo Santo (Duet with Só Pra Contrariar)" (Pablo Flores Spanish Club Mix)	Robert Blades, Angie Chirino, Emilio Estefan, Jr.	Juegos De Amor	10:21
4.	"Mi Tierra" (Pablo Flores Latin Club Mix)	Estéfano	Mi Tierra	6:44
5.	"Hoy" (Pablo Flores Remix Full Mix)	Gian Marco Zigzag	Unwrapped	8:16
6.	"Oye Mi Canto (Hear my Voice)" (12" Pablo Mix)	Gloria Estefan, Jorge Casas & Clay Ostwald	Cuts Both Ways	7:21

== Chart positions ==
Chart (2006)	Peak position
Argentina Albums (CAPIF)	20
Spain Albums (Promusicae)	19
US Top Latin Albums (Billboard)	37
US Latin Pop Albums (Billboard)	12
