= Amor y Suerte: Exitos Romanticos =

Amor y Suerte: Éxitos Romanticos / Amor y Suerte: The Spanish Love Songs

Compilation album by Gloria Estefan
- Released: October 5, 2004
- Recorded: 1993–2004
- Genre: Latin pop
- Length: 53:20
- Label: Sony Discos; Epic (Japan Only)
- Producer: Emilio Estefan Jr.

Gloria Estefan chronology
Unwrapped (2003)	Amor y Suerte: Éxitos Romanticos / Amor y Suerte: The Spanish Love Songs (2004)	Oye Mi Canto!: Los Éxitos / Los Grandes Éxitos (2006)

Amor y Suerte: Éxitos Romanticos is the fourth compilation album released by American singer Gloria Estefan, but is the twenty-fifth album by the artist, overall. Released in 2004, the album was released in some European countries with the alternate title Amor y Suerte: The Spanish Love Songs. It Released internationally by Sony Discos except in Japan where the album was released by Epic Records/Sony Music Japan International. The album was also released with a Limited Edition Bonus DVD in the U.S., Europe, and Mexico that contained music videos.

== Content ==
Professional ratings
Review scores
Source	Rating
Allmusic	4/5 stars

Although many consider this album a greatest hits compilation of Estefan's Spanish language songs, it is actually a compilation of Gloria's love songs in Spanish but not necessarily all of her greatest hits. Most of the songs are number-one singles appearing on Billboard's "Hot Latin Tracks" in the United States. In 2006, a true compilation of her Spanish greatest hits was released under the name of Oye Mi Canto!: Los Grandes Exitos.

== Track listing ==
Track Listing
No.	Title	Writer(s)	Album	Length
1.	"Con Los Años Que Me Quedan"	Gloria Estefan, Emilio Estefan Jr.	Mi Tierra	4:35
2.	"Como Me Duele Perderte"	Marco Flores	Alma Caribeña	4:28
3.	"Tu Fotografía"	Emilio Estefan Jr. & Gian Marco	Unwrapped	3:48
4.	"En El Jardín" (Duet with Alejandro Fernández)	Kike Santander	Me Estoy Enamorando	4:49
5.	"No Pretendo"	Kike Santander	Destiny	3:47
6.	"Hablas De Mí"	Jorge Luis Piloto	Mi Tierra	3:40
7.	"Mi Buen Amor"	Estefano	Mi Tierra	3:48
8.	"Por Amor" (Duet with Jon Secada)	Rafael Solano		5:26
9.	"Mientras Tanto"	Gian Marco	Unwrapped	3:36
10.	"Por Un Beso"	Robert Blades	Alma Caribeña	5:01
11.	"Hoy"	Gian Marco	Unwrapped	3:26
12.	"Tengo Que Decirte Algo" (Duet with José Feliciano)	Robert Blades	Alma Caribeña	3:18
13.	"Ay, Ay, Ay Amor" (Previously Unreleased)	Gloria M. Estefan, Emilio Estefan Jr., Archie Peña		3:34

Bonus DVD
No.	Title	Album	Length
1.	"Hoy" (Salsa Version - Live from Sessions @ AOL)	Unwrapped
2.	"Tu Fotografía" (Music Video)	Unwrapped
3.	"Por Un Beso" (Live from the Atlantis Concert)	Alma Caribeña
4.	"Con Los Años Que Me Quedan" (Live from Live & Unwrapped Concert in Las Vegas)	Mi Tierra

== Chart positions ==
=== Weekly charts ===
Chart (2004)	Peak position
German Albums (Offizielle Top 100)	39
Italian Albums (FIMI)	54
Spanish Albums (Promusicae)	7
Swiss Albums (Schweizer Hitparade)	13
US Top Latin Albums (Billboard)	23
US Latin Pop Albums (Billboard)	4

== Certifications ==
Region	Certification	Certified units/sales
Argentina (CAPIF)	Gold	20,000^{^}
Spain (Promusicae)	Gold	50,000^{^}
United States	—	28,000
^{^} Shipments figures based on certification alone.

== Release history ==
Region	Date
Canada	October 5, 2004
World	October 25, 2004
United States	October 26, 2004
Japan	November 3, 2004
