= 1993 in Latin music =

This is a list of notable events in Latin music (i.e. Spanish- and Portuguese-speaking music from Latin America, Europe, and the United States) that took place in 1993.

== Events ==
- February 24 – The 35th Annual Grammy Awards are held at the Shrine Auditorium in Los Angeles, California.
  - Jon Secada wins the Grammy Award for Best Latin Pop Album for his album Otro Día Más Sin Verte.
  - Linda Ronstadt wins the Grammy Award for Best Tropical Latin Album for her album Frenesí
  - Linda Ronstadt wins the Grammy Award for Best Mexican-American Album for her album Mas Canciones.
- May 19 – The American Society of Composers, Authors and Publishers inaugurates its El Premio ASCAP, an annual award ceremony dedicated to Latin songwriters and composers.
- May 20 – The 5th Annual Lo Nuestro Awards are held at the James L. Knight Center in Miami, Florida. Jon Secada and Selena are the biggest winners on the award ceremony with both receiving three awards.
- July 10 – Billboard establishes the Top Latin Albums chart, which ranks the bestselling Latin albums in the United States. Rather than rely on retailers for sales report as previously done on its subcharts, Billboard compiles the chart by obtaining sales data from Nielsen SoundScan. Mi Tierra by Gloria Estefan becomes the first number-one album on the chart.
- October 1 – MTV Latin America is launched in the United States.

== Bands formed ==
- Ivy Queen (Reggaeton)
- Los Fantasmas del Caribe
- Marc Anthony (Salsa)
- Víctor Manuelle (Salsa)
- Jay Perez

== Bands reformed ==
Selena Y Los Dinos

== Number-one albums and singles by country ==
- List of number-one albums of 1993 (Spain)
- List of number-one singles of 1993 (Spain)
- List of number-one Billboard Top Latin Albums of 1993
- List of number-one Billboard Hot Latin Tracks of 1993

== Awards ==
- 1993 Premio Lo Nuestro
- 1993 Tejano Music Awards

== Albums released ==
=== First-quarter ===
==== January ====
Day	Title	Artist	Genre(s)	Singles	Label
18	La era de la boludez	Divididos	Alternative Rock, Funk Metal, Hard Rock		Polydor
26	Dynamo	Soda Stereo	Pop rock, Shoegaze, Alternative Rock, Dream Pop		Sony Latin, Sony Latin
26	Otra Nota	Marc Anthony	Salsa, Ballad	"Si Tú No Te Fueras" "Hasta Que Te Conocí" "El Último Beso"	RMM Records
Unknown Day	En Tiempo De Amor	Di Blasio	Easy Listening		BMG International U.S. Latin

==== March ====
Day	Title	Artist	Genre(s)	Singles	Label
9	Azúcar Negra	Celia Cruz	Salsa, Cubano	"Azucar Negra" "Bolero, Bolero"	RMM Records, Sony Discos
23	O Canto da Cidade	Daniela Mercury	MPB		CBS
31	Un Toque de Misterio	Ricardo Montaner	Ballad		Sono-Rodven

==== May ====
Day	Title	Artist	Genre(s)	Singles	Label
4	Selena Live!	Selena	Tejano, Ranchera, Cumbia, Norteno, Mariachi, Latin Pop		Capitol/EMI Latin
18	Hecho En Puerto Rico	Willie Colón	Salsa	"Idilio" "Atrapado"	Sony Tropical

==== June ====
Day	Title	Artist	Genre(s)	Singles	Label
1	First Class International	El Gran Combo de Puerto Rico	Salsa		Combo Records
1	Dilema	Luis Enrique	Salsa		Sony Tropical
1	Justo A Tiempo...	Víctor Manuelle	Salsa	"Me Dará el Consentimiento" "Estás Tocando Fuego"	Sony Tropical
8	Diego Torres	Diego Torres	Vocal		BMG Argentina
8	Solo Salsa	Galy Galiano	Salsa		Musart
15	Lastima Que Seas Ajena	Vicente Fernández	Ranchera		Sony Discos
15	Johnny Siempre Johnny	Johnny Ventura	Merengue		SDI
19	Con La Banda Santa Cruz	Graciela Beltrán	Banda		Capitol/EMI Latin
22	Aries	Luis Miguel	Ballad, Dance-Pop		WEA Latina
22	Mi Tierra	Gloria Estefan	Afro-Cuban Jazz, Latin Jazz	"Con Los Años Que Me Quedan" "¡Sí Señor!..."	Epic
29	Los Mundialmente Sabrosos	Los Hermanos Rosario			Karen Records
29	Canonazos De Ramiro "Ram" Herrera	Ramiro "Ram" Herrera	Cumbia, Tejano		Capitol Records

=== Third-quarter ===
==== July ====
Day	Title	Artist	Genre(s)	Singles	Label
27	Silver Edition	David Lee Garza Y Los Musicales			
29	La Garra Del Tigre	Los Tigres Del Norte			

==== August ====
Day	Title	Artist	Genre(s)	Singles	Label
10	Todos Historias	Eros Ramazzotti	Soft Rock, Pop rock, AOR		DDD, RCA, BMG International U.S. Latin
10	Mujer De Fuego	Olga Tañón	Merengue	"Contigo O Sin Ti" "Muchacho Malo" "Presencie Tu Amor"	WEA Latina
11	Algo Diferente	Mario Ortíz	Salsa		Rico Records
17	Nace Aquí	Gilberto Santa Rosa	Salsa		Sony Discos
24	Mis Mejores Canciones - 17 Super Éxitos	Selena	Vocal, Ballad, Tejano	"Como la Flor" "¿Qué Creías?" "La Carcacha"	EMI Latin
24	Amor Jollao	Toño Rosario	Merengue		Prime Records
31	Libre	Alejandra Guzmán	Pop rock	"Mala Hierba"	RCA

==== September ====
Day	Title	Artist	Genre(s)	Singles	Label
10	La Candela Viva	Totó La Momposina	Cumbia		Caroline Records
14	Xplosión	Vico C	Pop Rap, Reggaeton		Prime Records
21	Algo Más Que Amor	La Triplets	Country Rock, Latin		EMI Latin

=== Fourth-quarter ===
==== October ====
Day	Title	Artist	Genre(s)	Singles	Label
5	Sino	Mercedes Sosa			Philips
18	Los Machos Tambien Lloran	Banda Machos	Ranchera		MCM
19	Nueva Era	Yuri	Latin, Downtempo, Ballad		Sony Latin

==== November ====
Day	Title	Artist	Genre(s)	Singles	Label
1	Amor Amarillo	Gustavo Cerati	Pop rock	"Amor Amarillo" "Pulsar" "Av. Alcorta"	Ariola, BMG U.S. Latin
9	Luna	Ana Gabriel	Ballad		Sony Latin, Sony Latin
16	24 Kilates	Paulina Rubio	Power Pop, Ballad		EMI Latin
18	Mujer	Marta Sánchez	Synth-Pop, Europop, Ballad		Mercury

==== December ====
Day	Title	Artist	Genre(s)	Singles	Label
7	Un Alto En El Camino	Grupo Niche	Salsa		SDI
10	In Da House	Proyecto Uno	Hip-House, Merengue, Synth-Pop		J&N Records
13	La Pura Sabrosa	Fito Olivares			

=== Unknown ===
Title	Artist	Genre(s)	Singles	Label
El amor después del amor	Fito Páez	Pop rock	"El Amor Después del Amor" "Sasha, Sissí y el Círculo de Baba"	WEA Latina
The Father of Tex-Mex Conjunto	Narciso Martínez	Conjunto, Norteno	"Muchachos Alegres" "Luzita"	Arhoolie Records
Animal Nocturno	Ricardo Arjona			Sony Latin
Intensamente	Eddie Santiago	Salsa		Capitol/EMI Latin
Me Amarás	Ricky Martin	Europop		Sony Latin, Sony Latin
Piel De Niña	Alejandro Fernández	Ballad, Mariachi		Sony Discos
Te Llevo En Mi	Jay Perez	Conjunto, Tejano		Sony Music
Rompecabeza: The Puzzle	Tito Nieves	Salsa	"Amores Como Tu" "Mi Vida de Ayer"	RMM Records
Cuando Parara La Lluvia	Johnny Rivera	Salsa	"Cuando Parara La Lluvia"	Sony, Sonero Records
Inalcanzable	Marco Antonio Solís And Los Bukis			
Titanomaquia	Titãs	Hard Rock, Grunge		Warner Music Brasil
Un Segundo En El Tiempo	Cristian Castro			FonoVisa
Si Tú Me Miras	Alejandro Sanz	Acoustic, Soft Rock, Latin, Pop rock	"Si Tu Me Miras" "El Escaparate" "Mi Primera Cancion"	WEA
The Hours Between Night + Day	Ottmar Liebert	Flamenco, Downtempo		Epic
A Bombazo...Sí!	Grupo Manía	Bomba		Top Ten Hits
Tu Ultima Cancion	Los Temerarios	Ranchera, Bolero		AFG Sigma Records
Cara De Nino	Jerry Rivera	Salsa		Sony Tropical
Tesorito...Baila Conmigo	Laura León	Cumbia		WEA Latina
Mi Media Mitad	Rey Ruiz	Salsa		Epic
Danzón (Dance On)	Arturo Sandoval	Latin Jazz	"Africa" "Conjunto"	GRP
944 Columbus	Mario Bauza and the Afro-Cuban Jazz Orchestra	Latin Jazz		Messidor
As Canções Que Você Fez Pra Mim	Maria Bethânia	Música popular brasileira		PolyGram
Las Canciones Que Hiciste pra Mí	Maria Bethânia	Música popular brasileira		PolyGram

== Best-selling records ==
=== Best-selling albums ===
The following is a list of the top 5 best-selling Latin albums of 1993 in the United States in the categories of Latin pop, Regional Mexican, and Tropical/salsa, according to Billboard.

Category	Rank	Album	Artist
Latin pop	1	Romance	Luis Miguel
Latin pop	2	Aries	Luis Miguel
Latin pop	3	The Best	Ana Gabriel
Latin pop	4	Live	Gipsy Kings
Latin pop	5	Jon Secada	Jon Secada
Regional Mexican	1	Entre a Mi Mundo	Selena
Regional Mexican	2	Ahora y Siempre	La Mafia
Regional Mexican	3	Selena Live!	Selena
Regional Mexican	4	Con Sangre de Indio	Banda Machos
Regional Mexican	5	Lo Haré Por Ti	Mazz
Tropical/Salsa	1	Cuenta Conmigo	Jerry Rivera
Tropical/Salsa	2	Areíto	Juan Luis Guerra y 4.40
Tropical/Salsa	3	Mi Tierra	Gloria Estefan
Tropical/Salsa	4	Rey Ruiz	Rey Ruiz
Tropical/Salsa	5	Frenesí	Linda Ronstadt

=== Best-performing songs ===
The following is a list of the top 10 best-performing Latin songs in the United States in 1995, according to Billboard.

Rank	Single	Artist
1	"Me Estoy Enamorando"	La Mafia
2	"Mi Tierra"	Gloria Estefan
3	"Castillo Azul"	Ricardo Montaner
4	"Nunca Voy a Olvidarte"	Cristian Castro
5	"Muchacha Triste"	Los Fantasmas del Caribe
6	"Ayer"	Luis Miguel
7	"Sentir"	Jon Secada
8	"Piel Adentro"	Ricardo Montaner
9	"Un Corazón Hecho Pedazos"	Ednita Nazario
10	"Lástima Que Seas Ajena"	Vicente Fernández

== Births ==
- January 10 – Rauw Alejandro, Puerto Rican rapper
- February 3 – Lalo Ebratt, Colombian reggaeton singer
- March 30 – Anitta, Brazilian singer, songwriter, actress, dancer and record producer
- April 9 – Jhayco, Puerto Rican rapper
- December 3 – Sech, Panamanian trap singer
- December 16 – Cazzu, Argentine rapper

== Deaths ==
- June 29 – Héctor Lavoe, Puerto Rican salsa singer
- August 14 – José Basso, Argentine tango composer
