= No Me Dejes de Querer =

2000 single by Gloria Estefan

Single by Gloria Estefan

from the album Alma Caribeña
- Released: March 27, 2000
- Studio: Crescent Moon Studios, Miami, Florida
- Genre: Son cubano; murga
- Length: 3:28
- Label: Epic
- Songwriters: Gloria Estefan; Emilio Estefan Jr.; Robert Dee Blades
- Producers: Estefan, Jr.; Blades

Gloria Estefan singles chronology
"Music of My Heart" (1999)	"No Me Dejes de Querer" (2000)	"Cómo Me Duele Perderte" (2000)

Music video
- "No Me Dejes de Querer" on YouTube

"No Me Dejes de Querer" (transl. "Don't Stop Loving Me") is a song by Cuban-American singer Gloria Estefan from her ninth studio album, Alma Caribeña (2000). The song was written by the artist along with Roberto Blades and her husband Emilio Estefan. The latter two also handled the song's production. It was released as the album's lead single on March 27, 2000, by Epic Records. "No Me Dejes de Querer" is a son cubano and murga song in which the narrator pleads her lover to never stop loving her. The song was met with mostly positive reviews, which found it to be an upbeat number.

Commercially, the song reached number one in Spain and topped the Billboard Hot Latin Songs, Latin Pop Airplay, and Tropical Airplay charts in the United States. An accompanying music video directed by Emilio was filmed in Miami, Florida, and features Gloria dancing with extras at the Tropicana Club. The visual won the Latin Grammy Award for Best Short Form Music Video in 2000. The song itself received several accolades including a Latin Grammy nomination for Best Tropical Song.

== Background and composition ==
In 1998, Gloria Estefan released Gloria!, a disco-influenced pop album. Although met with favorable reviews by music critics, it was commercially unsuccessful. A year later, she starred in the 1999 American biographical musical drama film Music of the Heart and recorded its title track "Music of My Heart" with NSYNC. That year, she played a New Year's Eve concert at the American Airlines Arena in Miami, Florida, where during a rehearsal, her husband Emilio Estefan hinted that her next studio album would be "great". Further details about the project were not revealed until February 2000, when the title was announced, Alma Caribeña.

Recording for the album took place at Crescent Moon Studios in Miami, Florida, with Emilio and Roberto Blades handling its production. Alma Caribeña is Gloria's third Spanish-language album after Mi Tierra (1993) and Abriendo Puertras (1995). In the album, she draws from a variety of Caribbean music genres. Emilio and Blades co-wrote most of the album's tracks including "No Me Dejes de Querer", which features additional writing from Gloria. Musically, "No Me Dejes de Querer" is a son cubano and Panamanian murga track with a salsa section. Gloria described the song as a "happy record" and further elaborated: "It talks about a kind of love that is wonderful and happy and feels great, and you're saying to that person, 'Don't ever stop loving me'". A remix of the track by Pablo Flores was also included in the album and features Los Rabanes lead singer Emilio Regueira.

== Promotion ==
"No Me Dejes de Querer" was released as the album's lead single on March 27, 2000, by Epic Records. The accompanying music video was directed by Emilio Estefan, filmed at the Tropicana Club in Miami, Florida, recorded in 24 hours, and released on March 28, 2000. In the video, Gloria is seen wearing a Dolce & Gabbana dress and dancing with 200 extras who are dressed to the fashion of 1950s Cuba. At the inaugural Latin Grammy Awards in 2000, "No Me Dejes de Querer" won Best Short Form Music Video. At the 2001 Billboard Music Video Awards, the visual was nominated "Best Clip of the Year" under the Latin field but ultimately lost to "She Bangs" by Ricky Martin.

== Critical reception and accolades ==
A writer for Palabra described "No Me Dejes de Querer" as a song with a "catchy melody and flavor of Cuban son". Dan Aquilante of the New York Post called it a "sexy love song". The Sunday Herald editor Graeme Virtue found the track to be the album's highlight, lauding it as an "irresistible limbo lurch". Virtue, however, regarded the remix to be pointless, stating it "reflects badly on the entire enterprise". The Sun-Sentinel critic Sean Piccoli listed "No Me Dejes de Querer" alongside "Punto de Referencia" as tracks where Gloria "sounds much more at ease". Writing for The Boston Globe, Cindy Rodriguez stated that the artist "really cuts loose" on the "brassy" track and sings "with fiery brilliance". An editor for the Windsor Star described it as "uplifting" and claimed that Gloria leads a "spirited romp ".

In an otherwise negative review of Alma Caribeña, Deborah Davis of El Norte highlighted the song alongside "Tres Gotas de Agua Bendita" as songs where the artist "shines". The Newsday reviewer Richard Torres noted that Gloria "gets into a fine call-and-response with the background vocalists" in the track. The San Diego Union-Tribune contributor Ernesto Portillo Jr. complimented "No Me Dejes de Querer" as a "solid salsa dance number". Elysa Gardner wrote for USA Today: "Those seeking zestier fare can check out the sexy, horns-fueled 'No Me Dejes de Querer'". Mark Marymont of the Springfield News-Leader felt that "No Me Dejes de Querer" is "carried on a happy, propulsive beat" and further marked that the original and remix versions "recall Estefan's early days with the Miami Sound Machine. The Sunday Mail's Kris Teo commented that the song "smacks with a happy party feel with a breathtaking salsa mid- section". The Chicago Tribune reviewer Achy Obejas called the remix a "cardiac- provoking dance beat".

AllMusic reviewer William Ruhlmann regarded the remix to be a "requisite dancefloor entry". The Observer's Neil Spencer, who was not impressed with Alma Caribeña, opined that "things only catch fire on the finale, 'No Me Dejes de Querer', where Estefan does battle with some snorting brass". In an unfavorable review of the album, The Morning Call contributor Len Righi cited "No Me Dejes de Querer" as showing "how little consequence she is" and wrote that Reguiera outperformed her on the remix, which she described as the "most exciting track on the disc". Maddy Costa of The Guardian was more critical of the song, stating that the remix was the artist's "smartest decision" when making the album. Costa lambasted the track as an "abysmal song, the kind of spangly, flashing-lights-and-thrusting-rhythm tackiness you hear blaring from the speakers of every crap tourist disco from Benidorm to Barbados; something that parents of teenagers dance to in their exclusive resort hotels. It's so awful, it sends you scuttling back to track one to get the bad taste out of your mouth".

At the inaugural Latin Grammy Awards in 2000, "No Me Dejes de Querer" was nominated in the Best Tropical Song category, which was awarded to "El Niágara en Bicicleta" by Juan Luis Guerra. It was recognized as an award-winning song at the 2001 BMI Latin Awards. At the 8th Annual Billboard Latin Music Awards in the same year, it was nominated for Latin Dance Maxi-Single of the Year and Latin Dance Club Play Track of the Year, but ultimately lost both awards to "Solo Me Importas Tú" by Enrique Iglesias.

Commercially, it reached number one in Spain and topped the Billboard Hot Latin Songs, Latin Pop Airplay, and Tropical Airplay charts in the United States. It became her first Spanish-language song to rank on the Billboard Hot 100, where it peaked at number 77. Furthermore, it reached 100 in the Netherlands, 76 in Switzerland, and numbers 8 and 31 on the Billboard Dance Club Songs and Regional Mexican Airplay charts in the United States, respectively. Due to it ranking on the latter chart, however, Epic Records was suspected of performing payola by the magazine.

== Formats and track listings ==
Remixes

1. No Me Dejes De Querer (Album Version) – 3:28
2. No Me Dejes De Querer (Pablo Flores Miami Mix) – 8:37
3. No Me Dejes De Querer ("Flores" Del Caribe Mix Radio Edit) – 4:27
4. No Me Dejes De Querer (Unplugged) – 3:27

== Charts ==
=== Weekly charts ===
Chart performance for "No Me Dejes de Querer"
Chart (2000)	Peak position
Europe (European Hot 100 Singles)	99
Italy Airplay (Music & Media)	2
Netherlands (Single Top 100)	100
Spain (Promusicae)	1
Switzerland (Schweizer Hitparade)	76
US Billboard Hot 100	77
US Dance Club Songs (Billboard)	8
US Hot Latin Songs (Billboard)	1

=== Year-end charts ===
2000 year-end chart performance for "No Me Dejes de Querer"
Chart (2000)	Position
US Hot Latin Songs (Billboard)	23

== See also ==
- List of number-one singles of 2000 (Spain)
- List of number-one Billboard Hot Latin Tracks of 2000
- List of Billboard Latin Pop Airplay number ones of 2000
- List of Billboard Tropical Airplay number ones of 2000
