= Bailando! =

EP by Gloria Estefan
- Released: 1998
- Genre: Latin pop; dance; pop
- Length: 22:18
- Label: Epic

Bailando! is a special promotional release by pop singer Gloria Estefan.

Released in 1998, Bailando! was sold only in Target department stores as a promotion for the gloria! album. A complementary English-language release, Party Time!, was released at the same time, again sold only at Target.

There is only one track on the CD and Cassette: "The Bailando Megamix", a 22-minute megamix of seven of Gloria's biggest Latin hits up to that point, including one song in English-Language (Higher). Several of the included songs were remixed in a house or techno style. The medley was also included in the Cuba Libre single released in Europe and Spain.

== Megamix song sequence ==
- "Mi Tierra"
- "Abriendo Puertas"
- "Oye Mi Canto"
- "Montuno"
- "Tradición"
- "Higher"
- "Tres Deseos"

== Production credits ==
- Producer: Pablo Flores for Estefan Enterprises Inc.
- Remix and additional production by Pablo Flores.
- Keyboards and programming by Lester Mendez.
- Mixed by Javier Garza.
