= List of Billboard Tropical Airplay number ones of 2000 =

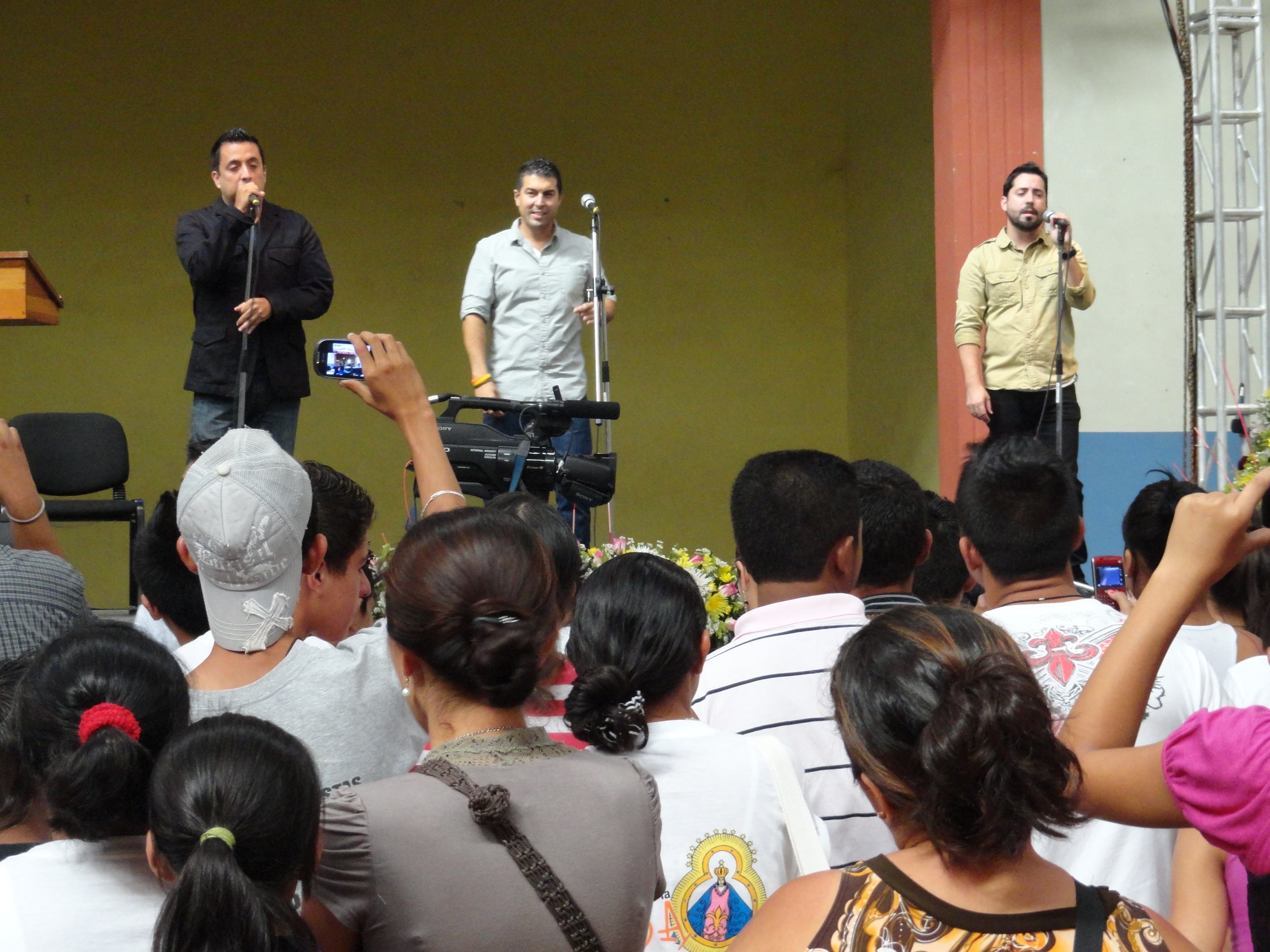
"A Puro Dolor" by Son by Four was the longest-running number one of the year with 10 consecutive weeks at the top spot and was named the best-performing tropical song of the year. They also had the final number one of the year with "Cuando Seas Mía".

Tropical Airplay (formerly designated as Hot Tropical/Salsa Tracks) is a chart published by Billboard magazine that ranks the top-performing songs (regardless of genre or language) on tropical radio stations in the United States, based on weekly airplay data compiled by Nielsen's Broadcast Data Systems. It is a subchart of Hot Latin Songs (formerly known as Hot Latin Tracks), which lists the best-performing Spanish-language songs in the country. In 2000, 15 songs topped the chart, across 52 issues of the magazine.

The first number one of the year was "Pero Dile" by Víctor Manuelle, which had been in the top spot since the issue dated November 13, 1999. It was succeeded by Carlos Vives's first number one on the chart with "Fruta Fresca". The two songs alternated on the top stop until the week of January 29, 2000, when Grupo Manía reached number-one with "Bajo la Lluvía". "A Puro Dolor" had the longest-running number of the year with ten weeks and was the best-performing tropical song of the year as well. Son by Four also had the final one of the year with "Cuando Seas Mía", the Spanish version of "Miss Me So Bad".

Four songs that reached number one in 2000 are Spanish-language adaptations of English-language songs, including "Cuando Seas Mía" ("Miss Me So Bad") by Son by Four, "Muy Dentro de Mi" ("You Sang to Me") by Marc Anthony, "Ven Conmigo (Solamente Tú)" ("Come On Over Baby (All I Want Is You)") by Christina Aguilera, and the Spanish version of "She Bangs" by Ricky Martin. Thalía and Luis Fonsi achieved their first number ones with "Entre el Mar y una Estrella" and "Imagíname Sin Ti", respectively. Due to the fact that tropical radio stations do not generally play pop ballads, Thalía's record label, EMI Latin, was suspected of performing payola and was removed from the chart the following week. Former La Makina lead vocalist Anthony achieved his only chart-topper with "Yo Te Confieso".

== Chart history ==
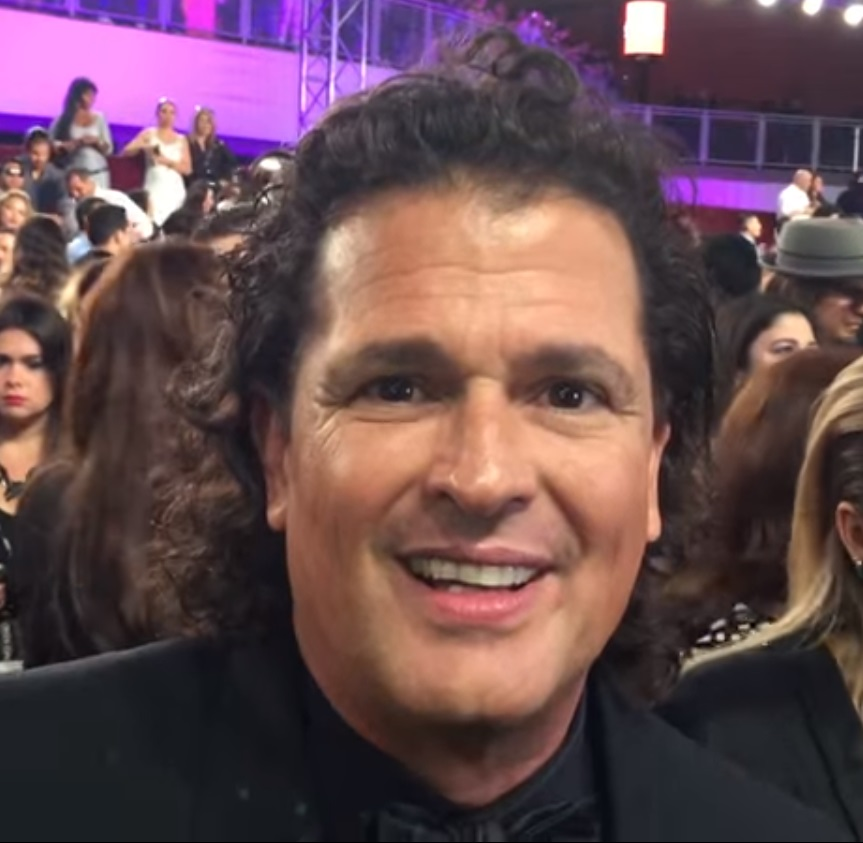
"Fruta Fresca" became Carlos Vives' first chart-topper.

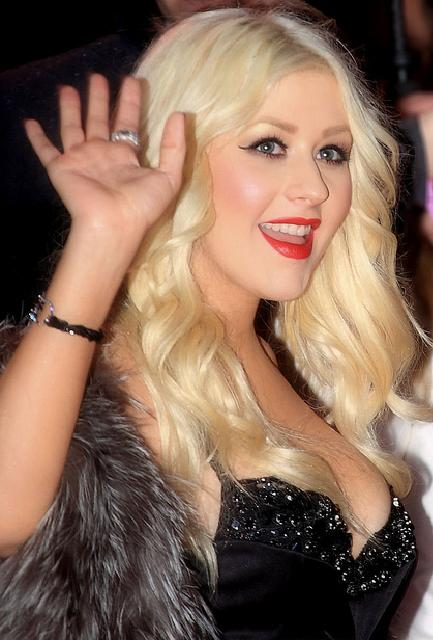
The Spanish version of "Come On Over Baby (All I Want Is You)" helped Christina Aguilera achieve her first number one on the chart.

Key
†	Indicates number 1 on Billboard's year-end tropical chart

Chart history
Issue date	Title	Artist(s)	Ref.
January 1	"Pero Dile"	Víctor Manuelle	
January 8	"Fruta Fresca"	Carlos Vives	
January 15	"Pero Dile"	Víctor Manuelle	
January 22	"Fruta Fresca"	Carlos Vives	
January 29	"Bajo la Lluvía"	Grupo Manía	
February 5	"Bajo la Lluvía"	Grupo Manía	
February 12	"Fruta Fresca"	Carlos Vives	
February 19	"Que Alguien Me Diga"	Gilberto Santa Rosa	
February 26	"Que Alguien Me Diga"	Gilberto Santa Rosa	
March 4	"Que Alguien Me Diga"	Gilberto Santa Rosa	
March 11	"Que Alguien Me Diga"	Gilberto Santa Rosa	
March 18	"Que Alguien Me Diga"	Gilberto Santa Rosa	
March 25	"Que Alguien Me Diga"	Gilberto Santa Rosa	
April 1	"A Puro Dolor" †	Son by Four	
April 8	"A Puro Dolor" †	Son by Four	
April 15	"A Puro Dolor" †	Son by Four	
April 22	"A Puro Dolor" †	Son by Four	
April 29	"A Puro Dolor" †	Son by Four	
May 6	"A Puro Dolor" †	Son by Four	
May 13	"A Puro Dolor" †	Son by Four	
May 20	"A Puro Dolor" †	Son by Four	
May 27	"A Puro Dolor" †	Son by Four	
June 3	"A Puro Dolor" †	Son by Four	
June 10	"No Me Dejes de Querer"	Gloria Estefan	
June 17	"Entre el Mar y una Estrella"	Thalía	
June 24	"Muy Dentro de Mi"	Marc Anthony	
July 1	"Muy Dentro de Mi"	Marc Anthony	
July 8	"Muy Dentro de Mi"	Marc Anthony	
July 15	"Muy Dentro de Mi"	Marc Anthony	
July 22	"Muy Dentro de Mi"	Marc Anthony	
July 29	"Júrame"	Gisselle	
August 5	"Júrame"	Gisselle	
August 12	"Júrame"	Gisselle	
August 19	"Júrame"	Gisselle	
August 26	"Júrame"	Gisselle	
September 2	"Imagíname Sin Ti"	Luis Fonsi	
September 9	"Imagíname Sin Ti"	Luis Fonsi	
September 16	"Imagíname Sin Ti"	Luis Fonsi	
September 23	"Cómo Me Duele Perderte"	Gloria Estefan	
September 30	"Cómo Me Duele Perderte"	Gloria Estefan	
October 7	"Ven Conmigo (Solamente Tú)"	Christina Aguilera	
October 14	"Ven Conmigo (Solamente Tú)"	Christina Aguilera	
October 21	"Ven Conmigo (Solamente Tú)"	Christina Aguilera	
October 28	"Yo Te Confieso"	Anthony	
November 4	"She Bangs"	Ricky Martin	
November 11	"Yo Te Confieso"	Anthony	
November 18	"Yo Te Confieso"	Anthony	
November 25	"Yo Te Confieso"	Anthony	
December 2	"She Bangs"	Ricky Martin	
December 9	"She Bangs"	Ricky Martin	
December 16	"She Bangs"	Ricky Martin	
December 23	"She Bangs"	Ricky Martin	
December 30	"Cuando Seas Mía"	Son by Four	
