= Cómo Me Duele Perderte =

2000 single by Gloria Estefan

Single by Gloria Estefan

from the album Alma Caribeña
- Released: July 10, 2000
- Recorded: 2000
- Genre: Bachata; salsa
- Length: 4:28
- Label: Epic
- Songwriter: Marco Flores
- Producers: Emilio Estefan, Jr.; Robert Blades; George Noriega

Gloria Estefan singles chronology
"No Me Dejes de Querer" (2000)	"Cómo Me Duele Perderte" (2000)	"Tres Gotas De Agua Bendita" (2000)

"Cómo Me Duele Perderte" (transl. "How It Hurts to Lose You") is a song by Cuban American singer Gloria Estefan from her ninth studio album, Alma Caribeña (2000). The song was written by Marco Flores with her husband Emilio Estefan and Roberto Blades handling its production. It was released as the album's second single by Epic Records on July 10, 2000. "Cómo Me Duele Perderte" is a salsa and bachata track that narrates the singer in pain of losing someone. The song was met with unfavorable reactions from music critics who criticized its arrangements and the singer's efforts. Commercially, the song topped the Billboard Hot Latin Songs and Tropical Airplay charts in the United States, while also peaking at number 12 on the Dance Club Songs chart in the same country and number eight in Spain. The accompanying music video was directed by Emilio, filmed in Miami, Florida, and features dramatic scenes of Estefan in front of a mirror remembering her former lover.

== Background and composition ==
At the New Year's Eve concert in 1999, Gloria Estefan's husband Emilio hinted that her upcoming studio album would be "great" during a rehearsal. Further details about the project were not revealed until February 2000 when the name of album was announced, Alma Caribeña. Recording for the album took place at the Crescent Moon Studios in Miami, Florida with Emilio and Roberto Blades handling its production. Alma Caribeña is Estefan's third Spanish-language album after Mi Tierra (1993) and Abriendo Puertras 1995. In the album, she draws from a variety of music from the Spanish-speaking Caribbean including boleros, salsa, and bachata. Mexican composer Marco Flores penned two tracks for the album, one of which is "Cómo Me Duele Perderte". Musically, "Cómo Me Duele Perderte" is a mid-tempo fusion genre of salsa and bachata that features a Dominican melody and Cuban percussions. It also includes a charanga violin section. In the lyrics, the singer narrates the pain of losing someone; Estefan dedicated the song to Tito Puente who died a month prior to the single's release.

== Promotion and reception ==
"Cómo Me Duele Perderte" was released by Epic Records as the album's second single on July 10, 2000. The accompanying music video was directed by Emilio, filmed in Miami, Florida and is according Lorena Corpus of El Norte "characterized by the transformation achieved by the Cuban singer, as well as scenes loaded with drama". In the video, the artist is seen reminiscing her former lover in front of a mirror and features flashbacks of the couple. Maddy Costa of The Guardian, who stated that the ballads are "oozing lachrymose strings and laughable sentiment" and found Estefan's chants of "Ay, ay, ay" to be "hilarious" in a negative review of the album. Deborah Davis of El Norte opined that the artist "seriously puts her soul" on both of Flores' compositions "but the effort is not enough". Billboard critic Michael Paoletta wrote in a favorable review of the remixes that the artist is "ultra-fine form as she gets rhythmically worked over by some of club-lands's finest". Commercially, it reached number eight in Spain and topped the Billboard Hot Latin Songs and Tropical Airplay charts in the United States. The track spent two weeks on the top spot of the latter two charts. It also reached number 12 on the Billboard Dance Club Songs.

== Formats and track listings ==
Remixes

1. Cómo Me Duele Perderte (album version) – 4:28
2. Cómo Me Duele Perderte (tropical version) – 4:31
3. Cómo Me Duele Perderte (Davidson Ospina Club Mix) – 7:08
4. Cómo Me Duele Perderte (Davidson Ospina Radio Edit) – 3:49
5. Cómo Me Duele Perderte (Davidson Ospina Radio Instrumental) – 3:45
6. Cómo Me Duele Perderte (Davidson Ospina Dub Mix) – 5:18
7. Cómo Me Duele Perderte (Pablo Flores Club Mix) – 9:47
8. Cómo Me Duele Perderte (Pablo Flores Club Mix Radio Edit) – 4:43
9. Cómo Me Duele Perderte (Pablo Flores Dub Mix) – 8:15

== Charts ==
=== Weekly charts ===
Chart performance for "Cómo Me Duele Perderte"
Chart (2000)	Peak position
Spain (Promusicae)	8
US Dance Club Songs (Billboard)	12
US Hot Latin Songs (Billboard)	1

=== Year-end charts ===
2000 year-end chart performance for "Cómo Me Duele Perderte"
Chart (2000)	Position
US Hot Latin Songs (Billboard)	35

== See also ==
- List of number-one Billboard Hot Latin Tracks of 2000
- List of Billboard Tropical Airplay number ones of 2000
