= Mi Buen Amor =

Mi Buen Amor may refer to:

- "Mi Buen Amor" (Gloria Estefan song), 1993
- "Mi Buen Amor" (Mon Laferte song), 2017
