= Party Time =

Party Time or Partytime may refer to:

- Party Time (The Heptones album), 1977
- Party Time (Arnett Cobb album), 1959
- "Party Time" (song), a 1981 song by T.G. Sheppard
- Party Time?, a 1983 EP by Kurtis Blow
- Partytime!, a 1998 special promotional CD release by Gloria Estefan
- PartyTime (album), the Cheeky Girls' debut album
- "Partytime" (song), a 1984 single by 45 Grave
- Party Time (ClariS album), 2014
- Party Time (TV series), an Australian television series
- "Party Time", an episode of the TV series Pocoyo
