= Anthony Maldonado =

Anthony Maldonado may refer to:

- Anthony Maldonado (baseball) (born 1998), American baseball player
- Anthony Maldonado (cyclist) (born 1991), French racing cyclist
- Anthony Maldonado (singer) (born 1976), Puerto Rican singer
