= Miss Me So Bad =

2000 single by Son by Four

Single by Son by Four

from the album Purest of Pain
- Released: 2000
- Recorded: 2000
- Genre: Latin pop; salsa; latin ballad
- Length: 3:36
- Label: Sony Discos
- Songwriters: Diane Warren; Omar Alfanno (Spanish lyrics)
- Producer: Ric Wake

Son by Four singles chronology
"Dónde Está Tu Amor" (2000)	"Miss Me So Bad" (2000)

"Miss Me So Bad" is a song performed by the Puerto Rican-American band Son by Four. It was released as the lead single for his third studio album and debut English-language album Purest of Pain (2000). It was written by Diane Warren and produced by Ric Wake with the Spanish version being composed by Omar Alfanno. Richard Torres of Newsday unfavorably called it a "Backstreet Boys reject". RS Murthi writing a negative review album stated: "Such things as You Are Beautiful, Miss Me So Bad and Purest Of Pain will probably make you realise how harshly you had judged someone like Barry Manilow - compared to his dribble, this really sounds quite soulless". The Spanish version, "Cuando Seas Mia", served as the main theme for the telenovela of the same title.

== Charts ==
=== Weekly charts ===
Chart performance for "Cuando Seas Mia"
Chart (2000–2001)	Peak position
US Hot Latin Songs (Billboard)	1
US Latin Pop Airplay (Billboard)	4
US Tropical Airplay (Billboard)	1

=== Year-end charts ===
Chart (2001)	Position
US Hot Latin Songs (Billboard)	23
US Latin Pop Songs (Billboard)	18
US Tropical Songs (Billboard)	10

== See also ==
- List of number-one Billboard Hot Latin Tracks of 2000
- List of number-one Billboard Latin Tropical Airplay of 2000
- List of number-one Billboard Latin Tropical Airplay of 2001
