= Por Un Beso =

2001 single by Gloria Estefan

Single by Gloria Estefan

from the album Alma Caribeña
- Released: 2000 (Mexico)
- Recorded: 2000
- Genre: Bolero
- Length: 5:01
- Label: Epic
- Songwriter: Robert Blades

Gloria Estefan singles chronology
"Me Voy" (2000)	"Por Un Beso" (2000)	"You Can't Walk Away from Love" (2001)

"Por Un Beso" (For a Kiss) is a song by Gloria Estefan, released as the fourth promotional single and seventh single overall from her third Spanish album Alma Caribeña. In 2004 it was included on her compilation album Amor y Suerte: Exitos Romanticos.

== Song history ==
This song is a theatrical ballad which talks about the betrayal of a lover through a simple kiss, the main idea of the song is the infidelity. After the betrayal made by her lover, she still does not hate him, though she does not want to be with him anymore.

The song bwas performed live at a special concert by Estefan at the Atlantis Paradise Island in the Bahamas, in which the choreography was theatrically arranged to match the song. In Mexico, a Mexican telenovela was created under the same name of the song.

== Official versions ==
1. Album version (5:01)
2. Tropical version (4:09)

== Charts ==
Chart (2001)	Peak position
U.S. Billboard Hot Latin Tracks	32
U.S. Billboard Latin Pop Airplay	18
U.S. Billboard Latin Tropical/Salsa Airplay	36
