= List of number-one singles of 2000 (Spain) =

This is a list of the Spanish PROMUSICAE Top 20 Singles number-ones of 2000.

== Chart history ==
Issue date	Song	Artist
1 January	Rhythm Divine	Enrique Iglesias
8 January	Rhythm Divine	Enrique Iglesias
15 January	Rhythm Divine	Enrique Iglesias
22 January	Rhythm Divine	Enrique Iglesias
29 January	Infinito	Bunbury
5 February	C'est la Vie (Always 21)	Ace of Base
12 February	What a Girl Wants	Christina Aguilera
19 February	Cartoon Heroes	Aqua
26 February	Go Let It Out	Oasis
4 March	The Bad Touch	Bloodhound Gang
11 March	The Bad Touch	Bloodhound Gang
18 March	American Pie	Madonna
25 March	American Pie	Madonna
1 April	Sobreviviré	Mónica Naranjo
8 April	Sobreviviré	Mónica Naranjo
15 April	Sobreviviré	Mónica Naranjo
22 April	Agustito (Ketama Goes to Miami Remix)	Ketama
29 April	Sobreviviré	Mónica Naranjo
6 May	No Me Dejes de Querer	Gloria Estefan
13 May	No Me Dejes de Querer	Gloria Estefan
20 May	It's My Life	Bon Jovi
27 May	Oops!... I Did It Again	Britney Spears
3 June	Sex Machine (Get Up I Feel Like Being Like A Sex Machine)	Tony Sweat
10 June	Sex Machine (Get Up I Feel Like Being Like A Sex Machine)	Tony Sweat
17 June	Sex Machine (Get Up I Feel Like Being Like A Sex Machine)	Tony Sweat
24 June	Sex Machine (Get Up I Feel Like Being Like A Sex Machine)	Tony Sweat
1 July	Sex Machine (Get Up I Feel Like Being Like A Sex Machine)	Tony Sweat
8 July	It's My Life	Bon Jovi
15 July	Ya no quiero tu querer	José el Francés
22 July	If You Leave Me Now	Mónica Naranjo
29 July	If You Leave Me Now	Mónica Naranjo
5 August	Boom Boom	Chayanne
12 August	Boom Boom	Chayanne
19 August	Boom Boom	Chayanne
26 August	Ya no quiero tu querer	José el Francés
2 September	Ya no quiero tu querer	José el Francés
9 September	Music	Madonna
16 September	Music	Madonna
23 September	Music	Madonna
30 September	Music	Madonna
7 October	Music	Madonna
14 October	Lady (Hear Me Tonight)	Modjo
21 October	Lady (Hear Me Tonight)	Modjo
28 October	Beautiful Day	U2
4 November	Beautiful Day	U2
11 November	Beautiful Day	U2
18 November	Beautiful Day	U2
25 November	No cambié	Tamara
2 December	No cambié	Tamara
9 December	No cambié	Tamara
16 December	No cambié	Tamara
23 December	No cambié	Tamara
30 December	No cambié	Tamara

== See also ==
- 2000 in music
- List of number-one hits (Spain)
