= List of number-one albums of 1994 (Spain) =

The List of number-one albums of 1994 in Spain is derived from the Top 100 España record chart published weekly by PROMUSICAE (Productores de Música de España), a non-profit organization composed by Spain and multinational record companies. This association tracks record sales (physical and digital) in Spain.

== Albums ==
Week	Chart Date	Album	Artist	Reference
1	January 3	Canto Gregoriano	Coro de Monjes del Monasterio de Santo Domingo de Silos	
2	January 10	Mi Tierra	Gloria Estefan	
3	January 17	Mi Tierra	Gloria Estefan	
4	January 24	Mi Tierra	Gloria Estefan	
5	January 31	Mi Tierra	Gloria Estefan	
6	February 7	The Piano	Michael Nyman	
7	February 14	Mi Tierra	Gloria Estefan	
8	February 21	Canto Gregoriano	Coro de Monjes del Monasterio de Santo Domingo de Silos	
9	February 28	Canto Gregoriano	Coro de Monjes del Monasterio de Santo Domingo de Silos	
10	March 7	Canto Gregoriano	Coro de Monjes del Monasterio de Santo Domingo de Silos	
11	March 14	Canto Gregoriano	Coro de Monjes del Monasterio de Santo Domingo de Silos	
12	March 21	The Piano	Michael Nyman	
13	March 28	Canto Gregoriano	Coro de Monjes del Monasterio de Santo Domingo de Silos	
14	April 4	The Division Bell	Pink Floyd	
15	April 11	Canto Gregoriano	Coro de Monjes del Monasterio de Santo Domingo de Silos	
16	April 18	Canto Gregoriano	Coro de Monjes del Monasterio de Santo Domingo de Silos	
17	April 25	Canto Gregoriano	Coro de Monjes del Monasterio de Santo Domingo de Silos	
18	May 2	El Pan y la Sal	Presuntos Implicados	
19	May 9	Mucho más que dos	Ana Belén y Víctor Manuel	
20	May 16	Crazy	Julio Iglesias	
21	May 23	Crazy	Julio Iglesias	
22	May 30	Crazy	Julio Iglesias	
23	June 6	Mucho más que dos	Ana Belén y Víctor Manuel	
24	June 13	Esta Boca es Mía	Joaquín Sabina	
25	June 20	Mucho más que dos	Ana Belén y Víctor Manuel	
26	June 27	Mucho más que dos	Ana Belén y Víctor Manuel	
27	July 4	Mucho más que dos	Ana Belén y Víctor Manuel	
28	July 11	Mucho más que dos	Ana Belén y Víctor Manuel	
29	July 18	Fogaraté	Juan Luis Guerra & 4.40	
30	July 25	Fogaraté	Juan Luis Guerra & 4.40	
31	August 1	Fogaraté	Juan Luis Guerra & 4.40	
32	August 8	Fogaraté	Juan Luis Guerra & 4.40	
33	August 15	Fogaraté	Juan Luis Guerra & 4.40	
34	August 22	Laura Pausini	Laura Pausini	
35	August 29	The Three Tenors in Concert	The Three Tenors	
36	September 5	The Three Tenors in Concert	The Three Tenors	
37	September 12	The Three Tenors in Concert	The Three Tenors	
38	September 19	Laura Pausini	Laura Pausini	
39	September 26	Laura Pausini	Laura Pausini	
40	October 3	Mis 30 Mejores Canciones	José Luis Perales	
41	October 10	Mis 30 Mejores Canciones	José Luis Perales	
42	October 17	Mis 30 Mejores Canciones	José Luis Perales	
43	October 24	Mis 30 Mejores Canciones	José Luis Perales	
44	October 31	MTV Unplugged in New York	Nirvana	
45	November 7	Laura Pausini	Laura Pausini	
46	November 14	The Songs of Distant Earth	Mike Oldfield	
47	November 21	The Songs of Distant Earth	Mike Oldfield	
48	November 28	Laura Pausini	Laura Pausini	
49	December 5	Laura Pausini	Laura Pausini	
50	December 12	Laura Pausini	Laura Pausini	
51	December 19	Laura Pausini	Laura Pausini	
52	December 26	Laura Pausini	Laura Pausini	

== See also ==
- List of number-one singles of 1994 (Spain)
