= Dulce Amor (song) =

Single by Gloria Estefan

from the album Abriendo Puertas
- Released: March 1996 (United States)
- Recorded: 1994–1995
- Genre: Vallenato
- Length: 3:44
- Label: Epic
- Songwriter: Kike Santander

Gloria Estefan singles chronology
"Tres Deseos" (1996)	"Dulce Amor" (1996)	"La Parranda" (1996)

"Dulce Amor" ("Sweet Love") is a 1995 song by Cuban American singer-songwriter Gloria Estefan, released as the second promotional single and fourth single overall from her second Spanish-language album, Abriendo Puertas. It was a promotional single only sent to Mexico and Spain to promote the album, and has strong vallenato influences.

== Charts ==
Chart (1996)	Peak position
US Billboard Hot Latin Pop Airplay	17
