= Tres Gotas de Agua Bendita =

Single by Gloria Estefan and Celia Cruz

from the album Alma Caribeña
- Released: August 5, 2000
- Recorded: 2000
- Genre: Salsa
- Length: 4:17
- Label: Epic
- Songwriter: Rene Toledo

Gloria Estefan singles chronology
"Como Me Duele Perderte" (2000)	"Tres Gotas de Agua Bendita" (2000)	"Dame Otra Oportunidad" (2000)

Celia Cruz singles chronology
"Oye Como Va" (2000)	"Tres Gotas de Agua Bendita" (2000)	"Yo Vivire" (2000)

"Tres Gotas de Agua Bendita" (Three Drops of Holy Water) is a song by Gloria Estefan, released as the third single from her third Spanish album Alma Caribeña.

== Song history ==
This single, released exclusively in Europe and Japan, has a very strong Afro-Cuban influence, arguably the strongest on Alma Caribeña. As well, it is sung with "The Queen of Salsa", Celia Cruz.

The song is dedicated to Gloria's grandmother Luciana. The main figure in the song, she is referred to as an old-fashioned woman because every time she faced a seemingly impossible problem, she fixed it with "agua bendita" (holy water).

There is also a phrase in which Celia Cruz says: "...Mi abuela con agua bendita pero yo...con Azúcar..." (My grandmother with the holy water but I...with sugar), referring to "Azucar!" (sugar), her famous celebratory cry.

A promotional copy of the remixes of the song made by Rosabel was sent to the United States, but did not have much impact on the charts.

This song is one of the collaborations that Gloria Estefan did with Celia Cruz before Cruz died in 2003.

== Charts ==
Chart performance for "Tres Gotas de Agua Bendita"
Chart (2000)	Peak position
Spain (Promusicae)	5
