= La Parranda =

Single by Gloria Estefan

from the album Abriendo Puertas
- Released: April 23, 1996
- Recorded: 1994–1995
- Genre: Latin pop
- Length: 4:20
- Label: Epic; Sony Tropical
- Songwriter: Kike Santander

Gloria Estefan singles chronology
"Dulce Amor" (1996)	"La Parranda" (1996)	"Reach" (1996)

To be distinguished from the operetta La Parranda by Francisco Alonso from 1928.

"La Parranda" ("The Big Party") is a 1996 song by Cuban American singer-songwriter Gloria Estefan, released as the third promotional single and the fifth overall from her second Spanish-language album, Abriendo Puertas. It was a promotional single only sent to US Latin radio stations to promote the album. Although the song received full remix treatment, it did not make it onto the Billboard Hot Dance Club Play chart.

== Track listing ==
Promo single
No.	Title	Writer(s)	Length
1.	"La Parranda"	Kike Santander	4:20

Remixes
No.	Title	Writer(s)	Length
1.	"La Parranda" (Latin Moon Mix)	Kike Santander	6:39
2.	"La Parranda" (Till the Dub Comes Up Mix)	Kike Santander	5:44
3.	"La Parranda" (Drum-A-Pella Mix)	Kike Santander	4:19
4.	"La Parranda" (Remix Radio Mix)	Kike Santander	4:37

== Charts ==
Chart (1996)	Peak position
US Hot Latin Tracks (Billboard)	31
US Hot Latin Pop Airplay (Billboard)	12
US Hot Latin Tropical/Salsa Airplay (Billboard)	11
