= Christmas Through Your Eyes =

Studio album by Gloria Estefan
- Released: September 27, 1993
- Studios: Crescent Moon Studios (Miami, Florida); Capitol Studios (Hollywood, California); The Village Recorder (Los Angeles, California); The Hit Factory and Flying Monkey Studios (New York City, New York)
- Genre: Christmas
- Length: 46:01
- Label: Epic
- Producer: Phil Ramone

Gloria Estefan chronology
Mi Tierra (1993)	Christmas Through Your Eyes (1993)	Hold Me, Thrill Me, Kiss Me (1994)

Christmas Through Your Eyes is the fourth solo studio album, and 16th overall, by Cuban-American singer Gloria Estefan. It was released on September 27, 1993 through Epic Records. A follow-up to 1993's Mi Tierra, it marked Estefan's first Christmas album. Produced by Phil Ramone, Christmas Through Your Eyes consists of eleven tracks, including ten cover versions of Christmas standards and carols and the original song "Christmas Through Your Eyes," co-penned with Diane Warren.

Critics generally found the album pleasant but bland, noting that despite some Latin touches and warm vocals, Estefan's energy and arrangements felt subdued and unremarkable, appealing mainly to dedicated fans. On the charts, Christmas Through Your Eyes peaked at number 43 on the US Billboard 200 and number nine on the Top Holiday Albums chart. It earned a Gold cerfiction in early 1994 and Platinum later that year. By 2009, it had sold 874,000 copies in the United States, according to Nielsen Soundscan.

== Background ==
Following the success of her multi-awarded Latin album Mi Tierra, Estefan decided on recording a collection of Christmas songs, including traditional songs along with the title track, an original song written by Estefan and Diane Warren. The title track was previously released with a different instrumental arrangement on Estefan's 1992 Greatest Hits album and released as a double A-side single with "Miami Hitmix" in Europe. The Spanish-language song called "Arbolito de Navidad" was also included. Estefan was accompanied by a big band on the song "Let It Snow! Let It Snow! Let It Snow!" and sings a jazz-inspired rendition of "This Christmas".

Technologically, the album production was used as a testing ground for what would be the digital long-distance audio technology used in the production of the Frank Sinatra album Duets, using the Dolby Digital system provided by Skywalker Ranch-based Entertainment Digital Network, so that Estefan could remotely listen to the production sessions in Los Angeles from her home studio in Miami. Both the Estefan and Sinatra album were produced by Phil Ramone and principally recorded and mixed by Eric Schilling. Music videos were filmed and released for the songs "This Christmas" and "Silent Night", which are included on the video collection Everlasting Gloria!.

== Critical reception ==
Professional ratings
Review scores
Source	Rating
AllMusic	2.5/5 stars
Entertainment Weekly	B−
Los Angeles Times	1.5/4 stars
Music Week	3/5 stars

Entertainment Weekly critic David Browne wrote about the album: "Give Gloria Estefan credit for using Christmas Through Your Eyes as a way to spice up over-recorded holiday standards with Latin-pop flavoring. Unfortunately, Estefan's usual energy flags; she sings nearly every song as if inhabited by the ghost of Karen Carpenter. And someone should have told producer Phil Ramone that making a Christmas album sound cold should refer to the time of year, not to colorless synthesizers and drum machines." AllMusic editor Stephen Thomas Erlewine rated the album two and a half out of five stars. He wrote that Christmas Through Your Eyes "has a few concessions to her Cuban heritage, particularly with "Arbolito de Navidad," but much of the album is devoted to adult contemporary arrangements of familiar songs [...] In other words, it's nothing remarkable, even if it has a nice new song in the form of the title track, and it will wind up only being of interest to dedicated Estefan fans."

Chris Willman, writing for The Los Angeles Times noted that "though not ostensibly a kids' album, this is more lullaby music. The occasional hint of a Latin beat and a bilingual "Silent Night" are among the few distinguishing features Mama Estefan offers." In his review for Music Week, Alan Jones, remarked that "Gloria will again disappoint fans of her more regular output with this selection of seasonal favourites. Her vocals are warm and intimate on the mainly traditional titles here but arrangements, both vocal and instrumental, are extremely low key here and where lush orchestrations might have helped, she is often supported by synth recreations." New York Times critic Stephen Holden found that Estefan was "too bland a stylist to put an indelible personal stamp on any of the 11 songs on her Christmas album. The record begins pretentiously with an overture followed by pleasant, straightforward readings of mostly familiar songs arranged in twinkly pop settings lightly seasoned with Latin and pop-funk rhythms."

== Commercial performance ==
Christmas Through Your Eyes peaked at number 43 on the US Billboard 200 chart. It also reached the top ten of Billboard's Top Holiday Albums chart, peaking at number nine. The album was certified Gold by the Recording Industry Association of America on January 7, 1994. In December 1994, it reached Platinum status in the United States for shipments figures in excess of over a million copies. By July 2009, Christmas Through Your Eyes had sold 874,000 copies domestically, according to Nielsen Soundscan.

== Track listing ==
No.	Title	Writer(s)	Length
1.	"Overture: Silver Bells"	Jay Livingston; Ray Evans	4:18
2.	"The Christmas Song (Chestnuts Roasting on an Open Fire)"	Mel Torme; Robert Wells	4:13
3.	"Have Yourself a Merry Little Christmas"	Hugh Martin; Ralph Blane	5:30
4.	"Let It Snow! Let It Snow! Let It Snow!"	Jule Styne; Sammy Cahn	3:56
5.	"This Christmas"	Donny Hathaway; Nadine McKinnor	4:11
6.	"I'll Be Home for Christmas"	Kim Gannon; Walter Kent; Buck Ram	3:30
7.	"White Christmas"	Irving Berlin	4:13
8.	"Silent Night"	Joseph Mohr; Franz Gruber	4:38
9.	"Christmas Through Your Eyes"	Gloria Estefan; Diane Warren	5:01
10.	"Árbolito de Navidad"	Jose Barros	3:56
11.	"Christmas Auld Lang Syne"	Mann Curtis; Frank Military	2:35
Total length:			46:01

2021 Deluxe Edition bonus tracks
No.	Title	Writer(s)	Length
12.	"Love on Layaway"	Emilio Estefan Jr.; Angie Chirino	4:06
13.	"Mary's Boy Child"	Jester Hairston	3:09
14.	"Christmas Auld Lang Syne" (with Tiempo Libre)	Curtis; Military	3:28
Total length:			57:10

== Personnel ==
Adapted from AllMusic.

=== Musicians ===
- Gloria Estefan – vocals
- Charley Pollard – synthesizer programming (1, 3, 4, 8)
- Eddie Karam – synthesizer editing (1, 4)
- Rob Mounsey – programming (2, 5, 9), arrangements (2, 5, 9)
- Doug Katsaros – programming (6), arrangements (6)
- Peter Schwartz – programming (7), arrangements (7)
- Lawrence Dermer – keyboards (10)
- Juanito Márquez – programming (10), acoustic guitar (10), arrangements (10)
- Clay Ostwald – programming (11), arrangements (11)
- Rene Toledo – guitars (1, 4, 5, 7), electric guitar (9)
- Dennis Budimir – acoustic guitar (8)
- Jorge Casas – bass (7)

Singers

- Singers Unlimited: Len Dresslar, Bonnie Herman, Gene Puerling and Don Shelton – backing vocals (1, 3)
- Gene Puerling – vocal arrangements (1, 3)
- Rob Mounsey – backing vocals (2)
- Jill Dell'Abate, Brian Jones, Caryn Jones, Kristen Jones, Karen Kamon, Doug Katsaros, Daniel Lavsky, Lukas Previn, BJ Ramone, Joey Rigal and Annette Sanders – backing vocals (5, 9)
- The American Boychoir – choir (6)

Orchestra (Tracks 1, 3, 4, 8)

- Patrick Williams – arrangements and conductor

Percussion

- Alan Estes
- Jerry Williams

Horns and Woodwinds

- Gene Cipriano – woodwinds
- Louise DiTullio – woodwinds
- Susan Greenberg – woodwinds
- Brice Martin – woodwinds
- Geraldine Rotella – woodwinds
- Charles Loper – trombone
- Bill Reichenbach Jr. – trombone
- Bill Watrous – trombone
- Charles Davis – trumpet
- George Graham – trumpet
- Larry Hall – trumpet
- Warren Luening – trumpet
- Donald Wadrop – tuba
- Marilyn Johnson – French horn
- Calvin Smith – French horn
- Kurt Snyder – French horn
- James Thatcher – French horn

String section (Tracks 1, 3 & 8)

- Drew Dembowski – bass
- Susan Ranney – bass
- Kenneth Wild – bass
- Anna Karam – cello
- Danny Little – cello
- Gloria Strassner – cello
- Nancy Stein-Ross – cello
- Dorothy Remsen – harp
- Rick Gerding – viola
- Carrie Holzman-Little – viola
- Margot MacLaine – viola
- James Ross – viola
- Patricia Aiken – violin
- Dixie Blackstone – violin
- Bette Bryers – violin
- Assa Drori – violin
- Jennifer Johnson – violin
- Patricia Johnson – violin
- Miran Kojan – violin
- Norma Leonard – violin
- Don Palmer – violin
- Jay Rosen – violin
- Robert Sanov – violin
- Kwihee Shamban – violin
- Gerald Vinci – violin
- Kenneth Yerke – violin

=== Production ===
- Phil Ramone – producer
- Richard Alderson – engineer
- Humberto Gatica – engineer
- Lolly Grodner – engineer
- Robert Hart – engineer
- Patrice Levinsohn – engineer
- Charley Pollard – engineer
- Eric Schilling – engineer, mixing
- Nora Castillo – assistant engineer
- Sebastián Krys – assistant engineer, mix assistant
- Leslie Ann Jones – assistant engineer
- Charlie Paakkari – assistant engineer
- Neil Perry – assistant engineer
- Bob Ludwig – mastering at Gateway Mastering (Portland, Maine)
- Jill Dell'Abate – project coordinator
- David Coleman – art direction
- Alberto Tolot – photography
- Emilio Estefan Jr. – management

== Charts ==
Chart performance for Christmas Through Your Eyes
Chart (1994)	Peak position
Australian Albums (ARIA)	140
US Billboard 200	43
US Top Holiday Albums (Billboard)	9
US Top Pop Catalog Albums (Billboard)	12
US Top 100 Albums (Cashbox)	41

== Certifications ==
Certifications for Christmas Through Your Eyes
Region	Certification	Certified units/sales
United States (RIAA)	Platinum	874,000

== Release history ==
Christmas Through Your Eyes release history
Region	Date
Europe	September 27, 1993
United States	September 28, 1993
Canada	October 12, 1993
Japan	November 3, 1993
