= Partytime! =

EP by Gloria Estefan
- Released: 1998
- Genre: Dance / Pop
- Length: 22:16
- Label: Epic
- Producer: Pablo Flores

"Partytime!" is a special promotional release by pop singer Gloria Estefan.

Released in 1998, "Partytime!" was sold only in Target Corporation department stores as a form of promotion for the Gloria! album. A complementary Spanish-language remix single, Bailando!, was released at the same time, again sold only at Target.

There is only one track on the release: "The Party Time Megamix", a 22-minute megamix of nine of Gloria's biggest hits up to that point, including a few with Miami Sound Machine. The megamix is an amalgamation of Megamix (1992) and Gloria's Hitmix (1998). Several of the included songs were remixed in a House or Techno style.

== Megamix song sequence ==
- "Dr. Beat"
- "Conga"
- "I'm Not Giving You Up (Tony Moran Remix)"
- "You'll Be Mine (Party Time) (Rosabel's Fiesta Mix)"
- "Rhythm Is Gonna Get You"
- "1-2-3"
- "Get On Your Feet"
- "Everlasting Love (Classic Paradise Mix)"
- "Turn The Beat Around"

== Production credits ==
- Producer: Pablo Flores for Estefan Enterprises Inc.
- Remix and additional production on "Turn The Beat Around" by Pablo Flores.
- Keyboards and programming by Lester Mendez.
- Mixed by Javier Garza.
