= Ayer (Gloria Estefan song) =

Single by Gloria Estefan

from the album Mi Tierra
- Released: May 1994 (Argentina and US)
- Recorded: 1992–1993
- Genre: Bolero; Son cubano
- Length: 5:15
- Label: Epic
- Songwriter: Juanito R. Marquez

Gloria Estefan singles chronology
"Mi Buen Amor" (1993)	"Ayer" (1994)	"Turn the Beat Around" (1994)

Music video
- "Ayer" on YouTube

"Ayer" ("Yesterday") is a 1993 song by American singer and songwriter Gloria Estefan. It was released as the final promotional single from her first Spanish album, Mi Tierra. The song reached number 5 on the Billboard Hot Latin Songs chart.

== Official versions ==
Original versions

1. Album version – 5:15
2. 2020 version (on Brazil305) – 4:47

== Charts ==
Chart (1994)	Peak position
US Hot Latin Songs (Billboard)	5
