= Santo Santo =

Single by Só Pra Contrariar featuring Gloria Estefan

from the album Juegos de Amor
- Released: 1999
- Recorded: 1999
- Genre: Latin-Pop
- Length: 4:10
- Label: Epic
- Songwriters: Robert Blades; Angie Chirino; Emilio Estefan Jr.

Gloria Estefan singles chronology
| "Don't Let This Moment End" (1998) | "Santo Santo" (1999) | "Music Of My Heart" (1999) |

"Santo Santo" (English: "Saint Saint") is the first single song by Só Pra Contrariar from the album Juegos de Amor, recorded as a duet with international pop star Gloria Estefan. The tune has its origins in Raffaella Carrà's popular hit "Tanti auguri" from 1978.

== Song history ==
The song is sung in the form of a prayer asking to a love saint to help both (Estefan and Pires), to find their true love. The song has been recorded in two languages, Spanish and Portuguese.

At the Latin Grammy Awards of 2000 this single received a nomination for Best Pop Vocal Performance by a Duo or Group, which was awarded to "Se Me Olvidó Otra Vez" by Maná.

== Charts ==
| Chart (1999) | Peak position |
|---|---|
| Brazil (Hot 100 Brasil) | 31 |
| Spain (Los 40 Principales) | 1 |
| US Billboard Hot Latin Tracks | 2 |
| US Billboard Hot Latin Pop Airplay | 2 |
| US Billboard Hot Latin Tropical/Salsa Airplay | 4 |
| US Billboard Hot Dance Music/Maxi-Singles Sales | 35 |
