= Gloria! =

- U.S. & Australian cover

Studio album by Gloria Estefan
- Released: June 2, 1998
- Recorded: 1997–1998
- Studios: Crescent Moon Studios, Miami
- Genres: Pop; dance; Latin pop; house
- Length: 73:28
- Label: Epic
- Producer: Emilio Estefan Jr.

Gloria Estefan chronology
Best of Gloria Estefan (1997)	Gloria! (1998)	Alma Caribeña - Caribbean Soul (2000)

Alternative cover
- International album cover

Singles from Gloria!
- 1. "Heaven's What I Feel / Corazón Prohibido" Released: May 5, 1998; 2. "Oye" Released: July 27, 1998; 3. "Don't Let This Moment End" Released: November 3, 1998; 4. "Cuba Libre" Released: November 9, 1998

Gloria! is the eighth studio album by Cuban-American singer-songwriter Gloria Estefan, released on June 2, 1998, by Epic Records. Conceived initially as a remix project, Gloria! evolved into a full studio album composed entirely of upbeat tracks, making it Estefan's first release to dispense completely with ballads.

The album spawned several singles, most notably "Heaven's What I Feel" and the chart-topping dance and Latin hit "Oye". Upon release, Gloria! received mixed to generally favorable reviews from critics, who frequently highlighted its energetic cohesion and dance-floor focus, and it earned multiple award nominations and honors related to its singles and accompanying visual projects.

== Background ==
Gloria! is a dance and house album which was a departure from Estefan's previous works. Though dance elements had been featured in previous recordings, this was her first album to consist entirely of upbeat club music. The project initially began as a remix album before being expanded to an entirely new record.

== Singles ==
The album spawned four singles and one promotional single. "Heaven's What I Feel" was released as the first single from the album and peaked at number 27 on the Billboard Hot 100. "Oye" was released as the second single from the album, however, its release as a physical single was canceled in the United States. The song peaked at number 1 on the Hot Dance Music/Club Play, Hot Latin Tracks, and the Latin Tropical/Salsa Airplay charts. "Don't Let This Moment End" was released as the third single from the album and peaked at number 76 on the Billboard Hot 100. In Spain, "Cuba Libre" was released as a fourth single and "Don't Stop" was released promotionally. Though they did not feature any tracks from Gloria!, the extended plays Bailando! and Partytime! were released exclusively at Target stores as a form of promotion for the album.

== Critical reception ==
Professional ratings
Review scores
Source	Rating
AllMusic	4/5 stars
The Atlanta Journal-Constitution	B
Robert Christgau	(dud)
Entertainment Weekly	B
Los Angeles Times	(favorable)

A reviewer from The Atlanta Journal-Constitution wrote, "Gloria! successfully merges Estefan's high-energy urges with today's top dance mix masters. The result is a nonstop dance workout as all the Latin-flavored tracks segue into one another." In a review for Entertainment Weekly, Chuck Eddy wrote that Gloria! was Estefan's most "unrelenting" fusion of "disco with salsa" since 1987, highlighting its "laudable lack of ballads". He noted that the album "never quite matches the Copacabana catchiness of Miami Sound Machine's bubbliest old hits", but praised tracks such as "Lucky Girl" and the "ominously undulating" "Cuba Libre", which he described as reaching "for the skies like a missile-crisis fiesta thrown by Donna Summer".

In a review for AllMusic, Stephen Thomas Erlewine wrote that the album is "infectious" and marked by "percolating disco beats" and "sunny melodies". He noted that the record recalls her "glory days of the late '80s", but with "a stronger Latin rhythmic underpinning", which "gives the music depth". While observing that "some of the songs themselves are slight", Erlewine emphasized that most "rank among her best uptempo songs and ballads", adding that Gloria! "proves that some dance-pop divas can get better—and more adventurous—with age". In a review for the Los Angeles Times, Elysa Gardner described the album as "virtually a nonstop dance party", driven by "percolating Latin rhythms" that recall Estefan's earliest hits, and "spiced with crisp, elegant production" influenced by house music and hip-hop. She highlighted upbeat tracks such as "Don't Stop" and "I Just Wanna Be Happy", concluding that Estefan "finds exhilarating, accessible ways to turn the beat around".

=== Accolades ===
Several nominations were received for the album's singles. "Heaven's What I Feel" received a Grammy Music Award nomination for "Best Dance Recording", as did "Don't Let This Moment End" the following year. Estefan received a Grammy nomination for "Best Video, Long Form" for the album's supplementary DVD Don't Stop!. Estefan received the Billboard Latin Music Award for "Best Latin Dance Club Play Track of the Year" for "Oye" and received an Alma Award for the music video for "Heaven's What I Feel".

Year	Award Show	Award
1999	Alma Awards	Outstanding Music Video, "Heaven's What I Feel"
1999	Alma Awards	Outstanding Host in a Variety/Music/Comedy Special or Series, "The World Music Awards"
1999	Alma Awards	Ricardo Montalban Achievement Award
1999	Amigo Music Award (Spain)	Best Latin Female Artist
2000	Billboard Latin Music Awards	Best Latin Dance Club Play Track of the Year, "Oye"
2000	American Music Award	Award Of Merit

== Commercial performance ==
Commercially, Gloria! achieved moderate success across major international markets, charting within the top 25 in several territories. The album peaked at number 23 on the US Billboard 200 and reached the top 20 on the European Albums chart, where it climbed to number 15. It also performed strongly in Europe, entering the top 20 in the United Kingdom, Switzerland, and Hungary, while reaching the top 40 in countries such as Germany, Belgium, France, and the Netherlands.

The album enjoyed its greatest commercial impact in Spanish-speaking markets, topping the Spanish Albums chart and earning a five-times Platinum certification for shipments of 500,000 units. Gloria! was also certified Gold in the United States, Canada, and Japan, and Platinum in Argentina and Uruguay, while selling approximately 50,000 copies in Brazil.

== Track listing ==
US and UK limited edition blue vinyl
No.	Title	Writer(s)	Length
1.	"Heaven's What I Feel"	Kike Santander	5:02
2.	"Don't Stop"	Emilio Estefan Jr.; Tony Moran; Angie Chirino	4:27
3.	"Oye"	Gloria Estefan; E. Estefan; Randall Barlow; Chirino	4:40
4.	"Real Woman"	G. Estefan; E. Estefan; Lawrence P. Dermer	4:22
5.	"Feelin'"	Dermer	4:10
6.	"Don't Release Me" (featuring Wyclef Jean)	Dermer; N. Jean	4:16
7.	"Don't Let This Moment End"	G. Estefan; E. Estefan; Dermer; Roberto Blades	4:42
8.	"Touched by an Angel"	G. Estefan; E. Estefan; Santander	4:11
9.	"Lucky Girl"	E. Estefan; Dermer	4:31
10.	"I Just Wanna Be Happy"	Dermer	3:54
11.	"Cuba Libre"	G. Estefan; E. Estefan; Santander	4:38

CD, cassette, and MiniDisc bonus tracks
No.	Title	Writer(s)	Length
12.	"Feelin'" (Love to Infinity remix)	Dermer	4:43
13.	"Don't Release Me" (Wyclef Jean remix)	G. Estefan; Dermer; Jean	4:05
14.	"Corazón Prohibido" ("Heaven's What I Feel" - Spanish version) (Pablo Flores remix)	G. Estefan; Santander	5:08
15.	"Cuba Libre" (Spanish version) (Pablo Flores remix)	G. Estefan; E. Estefan; Santander	4:38
16.	"Oye" (Pablo Flores Spanish remix radio edit)	G. Estefan; E. Estefan; Barlow; Chirino	4:17
Total length:			71:51

Europe limited edition 2-CD bonus disc (EPC 489850 5)
No.	Title	Writer(s)	Length
1.	"Que Ça Ne Finisse Jamais" ("Don't Let This Moment End" - French version)	G. Estefan; E. Estefan; Dermer; Blades; Christian Vie	4:44
2.	"Amour Infini" ("Heaven's What I Feel" - French version)	Santander; Vie	5:02

Canada and France CD, cassette, and MiniDisc bonus tracks
No.	Title	Writer(s)	Length
12.	"Feelin'" (Love to Infinity remix)	Dermer	4:43
13.	"Don't Release Me" (Wyclef Jean remix)	G. Estefan; Dermer; Jean	4:05
14.	"Oye" (Pablo Flores Spanish remix radio edit)	G. Estefan; E. Estefan; Barlow; Chirino	4:17
15.	"Que Ça Ne Finisse Jamais"	G. Estefan; E. Estefan; Dermer; Blades; Christian Vie	4:44
16.	"Amour Infini"	Santander; Vie	5:02
Total length:			71:55

== Charts ==
=== Weekly charts ===
Chart (1998)	Peak position
Australian Albums (ARIA)	65
Belgian Albums (Ultratop Flanders)	24
Belgian Albums (Ultratop Wallonia)	38
Canadian Albums (RPM)	65
Dutch Albums (Album Top 100)	47
European Albums (Music & Media)	15
French Albums (SNEP)	56
German Albums (Offizielle Top 100)	34
Hungarian Albums (MAHASZ)	20
Spanish Albums (Promusicae)	1
Swiss Albums (Schweizer Hitparade)	12
UK Albums (Official Charts)	16
US Billboard 200	23

=== Year-end charts ===
Chart (1998)	Position
US Billboard 200	196

== Certifications and sales ==
Region	Certification	Certified units/sales
Argentina (CAPIF)	Platinum	60,000^{^}
Brazil	—	50,000
Canada (Music Canada)	Gold	50,000^{^}
Japan (RIAJ)	Gold	100,000^{^}
Spain (Promusicae)	5× Platinum	500,000^{^}
United States (RIAA)	Gold	571,000
Uruguay (CUD)	Platinum	6,000^{^}
^{^} Shipments figures based on certification alone.

== Release history ==
Region	Date
Japan	May 30, 1998
International	June 1, 1998
United States	June 2, 1998
Australia	June 19, 1998
