= La Mákina =

Puerto Rican Merengue band

La Mákina was a Puerto Rican merengue band formed in the 1990s. It was organized by Fernando Colon (a former bassist for Los Sabrosos del Merengue) and Orlando Santana (who worked with Wilfrido Vargas and Toño Rosario). Several of the group's songs have ranked on the Hot Latin Songs chart in the United States. The agrupation received a nomination for Tropical New Artist of the Year at the 1997 Lo Nuestro Awards. It was led by its lead singer Anthony Maldonado who left the group in 2000 to pursue his own solo career.
