= ¡Sí Señor!... =

"¡Si Señor!..."

Single by Gloria Estefan

from the album Mi Tierra
- Released: October 1993 (Europe)
- Recorded: 1992–1993
- Genre: Son cubano
- Length: 4:40
- Label: Epic
- Songwriter: Juanito R. Marquez

Gloria Estefan singles chronology
"Montuno" (1993)	"¡Si Señor!..." (1993)	"Mi Buen Amor" (1993)

"¡Si Señor!..." ("Yes, Sir!...") is a 1993 song by American singer and songwriter Gloria Estefan. It was released as the fourth single from her first Spanish album, Mi Tierra. The song was released in Canada, Australia and in three different formats in continental Europe, whereas Tradicion and Montuno are known as the fourth release from this album in the U.S. and the U.K. respectively.

American actress Susan Lucci, known from the soap opera All My Children, used the song on the sixth night of season 7 of Dancing with the Stars with a mambo choreography.

== Critical reception ==
Anne Hurley from Entertainment Weekly described the song as a "delightful abandon" in her review of Mi Tierra. AllMusic editor Jose F. Promis noted it as a "happy upbeat" song. John Lannert of the Sun Sentinel also called ¡Sí Señor! a "steamy dancefloor entr(y)".

== Official versions ==
Original versions

1. Album Version - 4:40

== Charts ==
Chart (1993)	Peak position
Netherlands (Single Top 100)	44

== Formats and track listings ==
Formats and track listings of major single releases of "Si Señor!...":

Europe CD Promo Single (SAMP 1989)

1. "Si Señor!..." (Album Version)

Europe CD Single (Epic 659868 2)

1. "Si Señor!..." (Album Version)/ Dr. Beat (Remix) / Tradicion (Album Version)

A cardboard 2 Track Version (Epic 659868 1) and a 3 track vinyl 12" Maxi Single (Epic 659868 6) have also been released in continental Europe.
