= List of number-one albums of 1993 (Spain) =

Spanish musical ranking

The List of number-one albums of 1993 in Spain is derived from the Top 100 España record chart published weekly by PROMUSICAE (Productores de Música de España), a non-profit organization composed by Spain and multinational record companies. This association tracks record sales (physical and digital) in Spain.

== Albums ==
Week	Chart Date	Album	Artist	Reference
1	January 4	Tubular Bells II	Mike Oldfield	
2	January 11	The Bodyguard: Original Soundtrack Album	Whitney Houston y Otros Interpretes	
3	January 18	The Bodyguard: Original Soundtrack Album	Whitney Houston y Otros Interpretes	
4	January 25	The Bodyguard: Original Soundtrack Album	Whitney Houston y Otros Interpretes	
5	February 1	The Bodyguard: Original Soundtrack Album	Whitney Houston y Otros Interpretes	
6	February 8	The Bodyguard: Original Soundtrack Album	Whitney Houston y Otros Interpretes	
7	February 15	The Bodyguard: Original Soundtrack Album	Whitney Houston y Otros Interpretes	
8	February 22	Astronomía Razonable	El Último de la Fila	
9	March 1	Astronomía Razonable	El Último de la Fila	
10	March 8	Astronomía Razonable	El Último de la Fila	
11	March 15	Astronomía Razonable	El Último de la Fila	
12	March 22	Astronomía Razonable	El Último de la Fila	
13	March 29	Astronomía Razonable	El Último de la Fila	
14	April 5	Astronomía Razonable	El Último de la Fila	
15	April 12	Astronomía Razonable	El Último de la Fila	
16	April 19	Astronomía Razonable	El Último de la Fila	
17	April 26	Astronomía Razonable	El Último de la Fila	
18	May 3	Bajo el Signo de Caín	Miguel Bosé	
19	May 10	On the Night	Dire Straits	
20	May 17	On the Night	Dire Straits	
21	May 24	On the Night	Dire Straits	
22	May 31	On the Night	Dire Straits	
23	June 7	Lo Mejor del Soul	Varios Artistas	
24	June 14	El Espiritu del Vino	Héroes del Silencio	
25	June 21	El Espiritu del Vino	Héroes del Silencio	
26	June 28	Lo Mejor del Soul	Varios Artistas	
27	July 5	Lo Mejor del Soul	Varios Artistas	
28	July 12	Lo Mejor del Soul	Varios Artistas	
29	July 19	Mi Tierra	Gloria Estefan	
30	July 26	Mi Tierra	Gloria Estefan	
31	August 2	Mi Tierra	Gloria Estefan	
32	August 9	Mi Tierra	Gloria Estefan	
33	August 16	Mi Tierra	Gloria Estefan	
34	August 23	Mi Tierra	Gloria Estefan	
35	August 30	Mi Tierra	Gloria Estefan	
36	September 6	Mi Tierra	Gloria Estefan	
37	September 13	Mi Tierra	Gloria Estefan	
38	September 20	The Beatles 1962-1966	The Beatles	
39	September 27	The Beatles 1962-1966	The Beatles	
40	October 4	The Beatles 1962-1966	The Beatles	
41	October 11	The Beatles 1962-1966	The Beatles	
42	October 18	Mi Tierra	Gloria Estefan	
43	October 25	Duets	Frank Sinatra	
44	November 1	Máquina Total 6	Varios Artistas	
45	November 8	Duets	Frank Sinatra	
46	November 15	Duets	Frank Sinatra	
47	November 22	Mi Tierra	Gloria Estefan	
48	November 29	Canto Gregoriano	Coro de Monjes del Monasterio de Santo Domingo de Silos	
49	December 6	Canto Gregoriano	Coro de Monjes del Monasterio de Santo Domingo de Silos	
50	December 13	Canto Gregoriano	Coro de Monjes del Monasterio de Santo Domingo de Silos	
51	December 20	Canto Gregoriano	Coro de Monjes del Monasterio de Santo Domingo de Silos	
52	December 27	Canto Gregoriano	Coro de Monjes del Monasterio de Santo Domingo de Silos	

== See also ==
- List of number-one singles of 1993 (Spain)
