= Anthony Maldonado (singer) =

Puerto Rican merengue musician (born 1976)

- Born: October 13, 1976 (age 50); Bayamon, Puerto Rico
- Genre: Merengue
- Years active: 1990s–present
- Labels: J&N Records

José Anthony Maldonado Vargas (born October 13, 1976) better known as Anthony Maldonado, Anthony MKA or simply Anthony is a Puerto Rican merengue singer. He was the former lead singer of Puerto Rican merengue group La Makina. After a successful stint with the group in the 1990s, he left band to pursue a solo career. He release his debut solo album, Tú Serás Parte de Mi Mundo (2000). The album led to Anthony receiving a nomination for Tropical/salsa album of the year by a new artist at the 2001 Latin Billboard Music Awards. The album's lead single, "Yo Te Confieso" (co-written by Elvis Crespo and a recipient of the BMI Latin Award in 2002), topped the Billboard Tropical Airplay chart.
