= Montuno (song) =

Single by Gloria Estefan

from the album Mi Tierra
- Released: December 18, 1993 (UK and Europe)
- Recorded: 1992–1993
- Genre: Son montuno
- Length: 4:54
- Label: Epic
- Songwriter: Juanito R. Marquez

Gloria Estefan singles chronology
| "Tradición" (1993) | "Montuno" (1993) | "¡Sí Señor!..." (1993) |

"Montuno" ("Montuno") is a 1993 song by American singer and songwriter Gloria Estefan. It was released as the fourth single released from her first Spanish album, Mi Tierra. The song saw a UK release only as "Mi Buen Amor" and "¡Sí Señor!..." were released simultaneously as the album's fourth single in Latin America and Europe respectively. In the UK, it was released in December 1993 as a Limited Edition CD maxi and 7" vinyl. A 2 track CD single was released in some European countries. This single contained a special remix of Estefan's classic hit "Dr. Beat", the Hustlers Up-Town Full Length Disco Remix.

== Critical reception ==
Alan Jones from Music Week wrote, "Less than five minute long, but pressed at 33 rpm on seven-inch, Glo's latest is another take straight out of the Mambo Kings school of Latin American music. As such, its appeal is strictly limited, and it won't be one of her biggest hits."

== Charts ==
| Chart (1993) | Peak position |
|---|---|
| UK Singles (Official Charts) | 55 |
