= Mi Buen Amor (Gloria Estefan song) =

Single by Gloria Estefan

from the album Mi Tierra
- Released: 1993
- Studio: Crescent Moon Studios in Miami, Florida
- Genre: Danzonete
- Length: 3:48
- Label: Epic
- Songwriters: Gloria Estefan; Estéfano

Gloria Estefan singles chronology
| "¡Sí Señor!..." (1993) | "Mi Buen Amor" (1993) | "Ayer" (1993) |

Music video
- "Mi Buen Amor" on YouTube

"Mi Buen Amor" (transl. "My True Love") is a song by Cuban American singer Gloria Estefan from her third studio album Mi Tierra (1993). It was written by Estefano and the artist with her husband Emilio Estefan, Jorge Casas, and Clay Ostwald handling its production. It was released as the fourth single from the album in 1993 by Epic Records. It is a danzonete ballad, that according to a music journalist, speaks of a "romantic ode". Music critics gave it a positive reaction who found it delicate. Commercially, it topped the Billboard Hot Latin Songs chart in the United States. The accompanying music video features the artist in an empty ballroom. "Mi Buen Amor" was acknowledged as an award-winning song at the 1995 BMI Latin Awards.

== Background and composition ==
In January 1993, Gloria Estefan announced that she was working on a Spanish-language album titled Mi Tierra. The artist had wanted to record a Spanish-language album reflecting her Cuban heritage since the beginning of her musical career. Before recording in English, Estefan and her band performed at Latin nightclubs; she also remembered her grandmother teaching her old Cuban songs. Music had an important role in Estefan's family, her paternal grandmother was a poet, and an uncle played the flute in a salsa band. The singer's desire to record an album in Spanish was also influenced by her son, Nayib; she wanted him to recognize his Cuban heritage.

Mi Tierra was produced by Estefan's husband, Emilio Estefan, and fellow Miami Sound Machine members Clay Ostwald and Jorge Casas. Recording took place at the Crescent Moon Studios in Miami, Florida. Colombian musician Estefano composed four of the album's songs including "Mi Buen Amor", which he co-wrote with Estefan. It is a danzonete ballad which tells of a "romantic ode".

== Promotion and reception ==
"Mi Buen Amor" was released as the album's fourth single in 1993 by Epic Records. The accompanying music video was co-directed by Emilio, which marked his debut as music video director, and Mo Fitzgibbon. It features Estefan in an empty ballroom. AllMusic editor Jose F. Promis selected the song as one of the ballad highlights of the album Mi Tierra. John Lannert of the Sun-Sentinel states that it sets to a "delicate, lilting danzonete cadence". The Courier-Journal critic Howie Allen listed it as one of the four ballads in the album that "glide along on flowing melodies, delicate percussion, deft guitars and elegant string arrangements". The Knoxville News Sentinel's Chuck Campbell was unimpressed with the track, calling it and "Hablas de Mi" "the most saccharine of the lot". It was acknowledged as an award-winning song at the 1995 BMI Latin Awards. Commercially, the single topped the Billboard Hot Latin Songs chart in the US, making it her fourth number one on the chart. Lannert described "Mi Buen Amor" as one of the songs that made Estéfano a prominent figure in Latin music.

== Charts ==
=== Weekly charts ===
Chart performance for "Mi Buen Amor"
| Chart (1994) | Peak position |
|---|---|
| US Hot Latin Songs (Billboard) | 1 |

=== Year-end charts ===
1994 year-end chart performance for "Mi Buen Amor"
| Chart (1994) | Position |
|---|---|
| US Hot Latin Songs (Billboard) | 11 |

== Personnel ==
Adapted from the Mi Tierra liner notes:

Performance credits

- Cachao – double bass
- Jorge Casas – double bass
- Chamín Correa –guitar, requinto
- Luis Enriquez – percussion
- London Symphony Orchestra – strings
- Juanito R. Marquez – music arranger, guitar
- Los Tres Caballeros (Chamín Correa, Alejandro Correa, Alfredo Correa) – backing vocalist
- Clay Ostwald – piano
- Rafael Padilla – percussion
- Néstor Torres – flute

== See also ==
- List of number-one Billboard Hot Latin Tracks of 1994
