= Abriendo Puertas (Gloria Estefan album) =

Studio album by Gloria Estefan
- Released: September 25, 1995
- Studios: Crescent Moon Studios, Miami
- Genres: Latin; tropical
- Length: 42:01
- Label: Epic
- Producers: Emilio Estefan Jr.; Kike Santander

Gloria Estefan chronology
Hold Me, Thrill Me, Kiss Me (1994)	Abriendo Puertas (1995)	Destiny (1996)

Singles from Abriendo Puertas
- 1. "Abriendo Puertas" Released: September/October 1995; 2. "Más Allá" Released: December 1995; 3. "Tres Deseos" Released: January 1995; 4. "Dulce Amor" Released: March 1996 (promotional only); 5. "La Parranda" Released: December 1996 (promotional only); 6. "Felicidad" Released: 1996 (promotional only in Spain); 7. "Lejos de Tí" Released: 1996 (promotional only in Spain)

Professional ratings
Review scores
Source	Rating
AllMusic	3/5 stars
Entertainment Weekly	B
The Guardian	3/5 stars
Knoxville News Sentinel	4/5 stars

Abriendo Puertas (Spanish: Opening Doors) is a 1995 album released by Gloria Estefan. It is her sixth studio album as a soloist and second Spanish language album released.

== Content ==
Abriendo Puertas was the second Spanish language studio album released by Estefan after her successful Spanish debut album, Mi Tierra.

In contrast to Mi Tierra, an album primarily influenced by Cuban music, Abriendo Puertas draws on a wider variety of Latin American musical styles. For instance, the title track is an example of vallenato, a Colombian music genre. Several of the songs refer to Christmas and the New Year. The album has sold 2.3 million copies outside the US.

Estefan's second Spanish album won Best Tropical/Salsa Album at the 1996 Grammy Awards, her second Grammy Award.

== Track listing ==
All tracks are written by Kike Santander.

No.	Title	Length
1.	"Abriendo Puertas" (Opening Doors)	3:52
2.	"Tres Deseos" (Three Wishes)	3:32
3.	"Más Allá" (Beyond)	5:22
4.	"Dulce Amor" (Sweet Love)	3:44
5.	"Farolito" (Little Star)	4:40
6.	"Nuevo Día" (New Day)	3:36
7.	"La Parranda" (The Big Party)	4:20
8.	"Milagro" (Miracle)	3:38
9.	"Lejos de Tí" (Far From You)	3:50
10.	"Felicidad" (Happiness)	5:20
Total length:		42:01

Japanese release bonus track
No.	Title	Length
11.	"Abriendo Puertas" (Teri's Gettin' Hard Dub)	5:13
Total length:		47:07

== Personnel ==
Adapted from AllMusic.

- Photography - Alberto Tolot
- Violin - Alfredo Oliva
- Hand Lettering - Ann Field
- Clapping, Snare Drums, Hi Hat, Percussion, Redoblante - Archie Pena
- Violin - Barry Finclair
- Mastering - Bob Ludwig
- Violin - Bruce Wethey
- Violin - Charles Libove
- Background Vocals - Cheito Quinonez
- Assistant - Chris Wiggins
- Trombone - Dana Teboe
- Violin - David Nadien
- Background Vocals - Diana Serna
- Guest Artist, Electric Piano - Don Grolnick
- Violin - Donna Tecco
- Flute, Alto Saxophone, Baritone Saxophone, Tenor Saxophone - Ed Calle
- Bongos, Chimes, Claves, Congas, Cowbell, Drums, Floor Tom, Guiro, Hi Hat, Maracas, Redoblante, Shaker, Shekere, Timbales, Wind Chimes, Wood Box - Edwin Bonilla
- Violin - Elena Barere
- Cello - Ellen Westerman
- Producer - Emilio Estefan, Jr.
- Engineer, Mixing - Eric Schilling
- Assistant - Freddy Piñero, Jr.
- Violin - Gene Orloff
- Primary Artist, Vocals - Gloria Estefan
- Caja - Heberth Cuadrado
- Viola - Ira Weller
- Congas, Guiro, Tamboura - Jackson Fondeur
- Violin - Jan Mullen
- Violin - Jean Ingraham
- Cello - Jeanne LeBlanc
- Contractor, Coordination, String Contractor, String Coordinator - Jill Dell'Abate
- Violin - John Pintavalle
- Bass - Jorge Casas
- Violin - Joyce Hammann
- Conductor, 12 String Guitar - Juanito Márquez
- Viola - Julien Barber
- Arranger, Bass, Bells, Clapping, Composer, Cuatro, Guacharaca, Acoustic Guitar, Jug, Keyboards, Percussion, Producer, Background Vocals - Kike Santander
- Violin - Laura Seaton
- Bata Drums, Bongos, Cascabeles, Claves, Congas, Guest Artist, Guiro, Percussion, Shekere, Timbales - Luis Enrique
- Assistant - Marcelo Añez
- Congas, Guache, Tamboura, Tumbadora - Mario Ochoa
- Violin - Marti Sweet
- Viola - Mary Helen Ewing
- Art Direction - Nancy Donald
- Violin - Paul Peabody
- Guest Artist, 12 String Guitar - Rene Toledo
- Cello - Richard Locker
- Violin - Richard Sortomme
- Engineer - Ron Taylor
- Bass - Sal Cuevas
- Violin - Sandra Park
- Assistant, Clapping, Engineer, Mixing Assistant - Scott Canto
- Assistant - Sean Chambers
- Viola - Sue Pray
- Assistant - Ted Stein
- Soloist, Trumpet - Teddy Mulet
- Flugelhorn, Trumpet - Tony Concepcion

== Charts ==
=== Weekly charts ===
Chart (1995)	Peak position
Australian Albums (ARIA)	161
Belgian Albums (Ultratop Flanders)	24
Dutch Albums (Album Top 100)	17
European Albums (Music & Media)	23
Portuguese Albums (AFP)	18
Swiss Albums (Schweizer Hitparade)	16
Spanish Albums (Promusicae)	1
UK Albums (Official Charts)	70
US Billboard 200	67
US Top Latin Albums (Billboard)	2
U.S. Billboard Top Tropical/Salsa Albums	1
US Cashbox Top 100 Albums	66

== Certifications and sales ==
Region	Certification	Certified units/sales
Argentina (CAPIF)	Platinum	60,000^{^}
Colombia	4× Platinum	250,000
Netherlands (NVPI)	Gold	50,000^{^}
Spain (Promusicae)	6× Platinum	600,000^{^}
United States (RIAA)	6× Platinum (Latin)	600,000^{^}
Summaries
Europe (IFPI)	Platinum	1,000,000^{*}
Worldwide	—	2,900,000 (Note: According to Billboard magazine, Abriendo Puertas sold over 2,3 million copies outside the US. According to RIAA it sold 600,000 in US.)
^{*} Sales figures based on certification alone.^{^} Shipments figures based on certification alone.

== Awards ==
Year	Award Show	Award
1996	Grammy Award	Best Tropical/Salsa Album

== Release history ==
Region	Date
United States	September 26, 1995
Canada	October 3, 1995
Europe	September 25, 1995
France	November 13, 1995
Japan	October 19, 1995

== See also ==
- 1995 in Latin music
- List of number-one Billboard Tropical Albums from the 1990s
- List of best-selling Latin albums
