= Alma Caribeña =

Alma Caribeña – Caribbean Soul

Studio album by Gloria Estefan
- Released: May 9, 2000
- Recorded: 1999–2000
- Studio: Calima Music Studios; Capitol Studios (Los Angeles, California); Crescent Moon Studios; Outline Studios; Criteria Studios (Miami, Florida); Pianissimo Productions (San Juan, Puerto Rico)
- Genre: Latin; Cuban; tropical
- Length: 54:44
- Label: Epic
- Producer: Emilio Estefan Jr.; Robert Bladés; George Noriega; Randall M. Barlow; René L. Toledo

Gloria Estefan chronology
Gloria! (1998)	Alma Caribeña – Caribbean Soul (2000)	Greatest Hits Vol. II (2001)

Singles from Alma Caribeña – Caribbean Soul
- 1. "No Me Dejes de Querer" Released: April 10, 2000; 2. "Tres Gotas de Agua Bendita" Released: July 10, 2000; 3. "Como Me Duele Perderte" Released: July 31, 2000; 4. "Por Un Beso" Released: October 30, 2000

Alma Caribeña – Caribbean Soul is the ninth studio solo album and third Spanish album recorded by Cuban-American singer-songwriter Gloria Estefan. It was first released by Epic Records in France on May 9, 2000, and in North America on May 23, 2000.

== Reception ==
Professional ratings
Review scores
Source	Rating
AllMusic	3/5 stars
Entertainment Weekly	A−

At the 43rd Annual Grammy Awards, in February 2001, the album won the award for Best Tropical Latin Album, giving Estefan her third win in this category. At the 1st Annual Latin Grammy Awards, in September 2000, the video for the first single "No Me Dejes de Querer", directed by Emilio Estefan Jr. and Gloria Estefan, won Best Music Video. At the Billboard Latin Music Awards, the album won the award for Best Tropical Salsa Album.

== Track listing ==
Standard edition
No.	Title	Writer(s)	Length
1.	"Por Un Beso"	Robert Bladés	5:01
2.	"Punto de Referencia"	Robert Bladés; Angie Chirino; Emilio Estefan Jr.	4:51
3.	"Dame Otra Oportunidad"	Hernan "Teddy" Mulet; Robert Bladés; George Noriega; Emilio Estefan Jr.	4:04
4.	"Como Me Duele Perderte"	Marco Flores	4:28
5.	"Te Tengo a Tí"	George Noriega; Robert Bladés; Emilio Estefan Jr.	3:56
6.	"Tres Gotas de Agua Bendita" (duet with Celia Cruz)	René L. Toledo	4:18
7.	"Nuestra Felicidad"	Robert Bladés; Sal Cuevas	3:00
8.	"La Flor y Tu Amor"	René L. Toledo	4:23
9.	"Me Voy"	Marco Flores	5:01
10.	"Sólo Por Tu Amor"	Randall M. Barlow	4:03
11.	"Tengo Que Decirte Algo" (duet with José Feliciano)	Robert Bladés	3:18
12.	"No Me Dejes de Querer"	Gloria Estefan; Emilio Estefan Jr.; Robert Bladés	3:37
13.	"No Me Dejes de Querer" ("Flores" Del Caribe Mix – Radio Edit)	Gloria Estefan; Emilio Estefan Jr.; Robert Bladés	4:43

Japanese CD bonus track
No.	Title	Writer(s)	Length
14.	"No Me Dejes de Querer" (acoustic version / aka Unplugged)	Gloria Estefan; Emilio Estefan Jr.; Robert Bladés	3:27

US limited edition bonus disc (exclusive Warehouse Music release)
No.	Title	Writer(s)	Length
1.	"No Me Dejes de Querer" (Unplugged)	Gloria Estefan; Emilio Estefan Jr.; Robert Bladés	3:27

== Personnel ==
- Coros: Alberto Gaitán, Angie Chirino, Cheito Quinonez, George Noriega, Herman "Teddy" Mulet, Jessica Chirino, Lena Pérez, Olga Chirino, Ricardo Gaitán, Robert Blades, Roberto Blades, Sal Cuevas, Wendy Pederson
- Assistant Engineer: Alex Caballero, Chris Wiggins, Gustavo Bonnet, Ken Theis, Mike Rivera, Ricky Blanco, Roger Gonzalez, Tony Mardini
- Engineer: Carlos Alvarez, Freddy Piñero, Jr., Gustavo Celis, Javier Garza, Marcelo Añez, Mauricio Guerrero, Scott Canto, Ted Stein
- Engineer, Mixing: Sebastián Krys
- Violin: Barbera Porter, Brian Leonard, Darius Campo, David Ewart, Debra Price, Gil Romero, Gina Kronstadt, Jennifer Bellusci, Katia Popov, Mari Tsumura, Pedro Alfonso, Rachel Purkin, Robert Gerry
- Viola: Andrew Picken, Brian Dembow, Carole Castillo, Harry Shirinian, John Scanlon, Jorge Moraga, Keith Greene, Matthew Funes, Ron Strauss
- Cello: Jodi Burnett, Larry Corbett, Miguel Martinez, Paula Hochhalter, Stephen Erdody, Suzie Katayama
- Trumpet: Jason Carder, Jorge Torres, José Sibaja
- Bass: Edward Meares, Oscar Hidalgo
- Guest Artist: Celia Cruz
- Guest Artist, Guitar: José Feliciano
- Guest Artist, Flute: Nestor Torres
- Guest Artist, Piano: Papo Lucca
- Accordion: Egidio Cuadrado
- Concertina: Bruce Dukov
- Tres: Nelson Gonzalez
- Cuatro: Manny López, Yomo Toro
- Guitar: Justo Rivera
- Piano: Paquito Hechavarria
- Keyboards, Programming: Joel Someillan
- Rap: Emilio Regueira Pérez
- Remix Producer: Pablo Flores
- Technician: Kurt Berge
- Coordination: Kevin Dillon, Steve Menezes
- Contratista: Debbie Datz-Pyle, Patty Zimmitti
- Composer: Marco Flores
- Composer, Producer: Emilio Estefan, Jr.
- Composer, Primary Artist: Gloria Estefan
- Arranger, Producer: Juan Vincente Zambrano
- Arranger, Programming: Reyneiro Perez
- Arranger, Composer, Producer: Robert Blades
- Arranger, Composer, Keyboards, Producer, Programming, String Arrangements, Trumpet: Randall Barlow
- Arranger, Arreglos, Composer, Producer: George Noriega
- Arranger, Arreglos, Direction, Orchestration, String Arrangements: Jorge Calandrelli
- Arranger, Arreglos, Direction, Orchestration, String Arrangements, String Director: José Antonio Molina
- Arranger, Arreglos, Guest Artist, Piano: Papo Lucca
- Arranger, Arreglos, Cuatro, Guest Artist, Guitar, 12 String Guitar, Acoustic Guitar, Producer, Spanish Guitar: Rene Toledo

== Charts ==
=== Weekly charts ===
Weekly chart performance for Alma Caribeña
Chart (2000)	Peak position
Austrian Albums (Ö3 Austria)	50
Colombian Albums (ASINCOL)	10
Dutch Albums (Album Top 100)	24
European Albums (Music & Media)	12
French Albums (SNEP)	41
German Albums (Offizielle Top 100)	18
Hungarian Albums (MAHASZ)	31
Italian Albums (FIMI)	11
Portuguese Albums (AFP)	10
Spanish Albums (PROMUSICAE)	1
Swiss Albums (Schweizer Hitparade)	9
UK Albums (OCC)	44
US Billboard 200	50
US Top Latin Albums (Billboard)	1
US Tropical Albums (Billboard)	1

=== Year-end charts ===
Year-end chart performance for Alma Caribeña
Chart (2000)	Position
European Albums (Music & Media)	92
German Albums (Offizielle Top 100)	100
Spanish Albums (AFYVE)	28

=== Decade-end charts ===
2000s decade-end chart performance for "Alma Caribeña"
Chart (2000–2009)	Position
US Latin Albums (Billboard)	55

== Certifications ==
Certifications for Alma Caribeña
Region	Certification	Certified units/sales
Argentina (CAPIF)	Platinum	60,000^{^}
Mexico (AMPROFON)	Gold	75,000^{^}
Spain (Promusicae)	2× Platinum	200,000^{^}
United States (RIAA)	Gold	500,000^{^}
^{^} Shipments figures based on certification alone.

== Awards ==
Awards for Alma Caribeña
Year	Award show	Award
2000	Latin Grammy Award	Best Music Video, “No Me Dejes de Querer”
2001	Grammy Award	Best Traditional Tropical Latin Album
2001	Billboard Latin Music Award	Best Tropical/Salsa Album

== Release history ==
Release history for Alma Caribeña
Region	Date
France	May 9, 2000
Europe	May 15, 2000
United Kingdom	May 15, 2000
United States	May 23, 2000
Canada	May 23, 2000
Japan	May 24, 2000
Australia	June 9, 2000

== See also ==
- List of number-one Billboard Top Latin Albums of 2000
- List of number-one Billboard Tropical Albums from the 2000s
