= Cuba Libre (Gloria Estefan song) =

Single by Gloria Estefan

from the album Gloria!
- Released: November 9, 1998 (Europe)
- Recorded: 1997–1998
- Genre: Dance; pop
- Length: 4:38
- Label: Epic
- Songwriters: Gloria Estefan; Emilio Estefan Jr.; Kike Santander

Gloria Estefan singles chronology
"Oye" (1998)	"Cuba Libre" (1998)	"Don't Let This Moment End" (1998)

Music video
- "Cuba Libre" on YouTube

"Cuba Libre" ("Free Cuba") is a 1998 song by American singer and songwriter Gloria Estefan. It was released as the third single from her eighth studio album, Gloria!. It is a dance-pop song which was included on the album in two versions: English and Spanish. The song is one of the three only Spanish-language tracks, alongside "Oye" and "Corazón Prohibido". It represents a homage to Estefan's homeland, Cuba. "Cuba Libre" was written and composed by Gloria Estefan, along with Emilio Estefan Jr. and Kike Santander.

== Critical reception ==
Ben Wener from Beaver County Times noted the "bouncing Afro-Cuban flourishes" of the track in his review of gloria!. The Daily Vault's Alfredo Narvaez wrote that "Cuba Libre" is about "the feelings many of the expatriates of that island feel – hoping for a day that they'll be able to return home." Chuck Eddy from Entertainment Weekly named the song as "ominously undulating", adding that it "reach[es] for the skies like a missile-crisis fiesta thrown by Donna Summer." Joey Guerra from Houston Chronicle called it "an ode to Estefan's birthplace". Victoria Segal from NME stated that the singer "sparkles with diva potential", "tenderly singing of her homeland". Larry Flick from Vibe applauded the song, as well as "Oye", by stating that they "have a ferocious new energy and a vocal spark that Estefan hasn't previously displayed."

== Track listings ==
These are the formats and track listings of major single releases of "Cuba Libre".

Europe CD Maxi single (666691 2)

1. "Cuba Libre" (Spanish version)
2. "Cuba Libre" (English version)
3. "Bailando Megamix"

== Charts ==
Chart (1998)	Peak position
Spain (AFYVE)	3
