= Con Los Años Que Me Quedan =

1993 single by Gloria Estefan

Single by Gloria Estefan

from the album Mi Tierra
- Released: 1993
- Studio: Crescent Moon, Miami, Florida
- Genre: Pop; bolero
- Length: 4:18
- Label: Epic
- Songwriters: Emilio Estefan Jr.; Gloria Estefan

Gloria Estefan singles chronology
"Mi Tierra" (1993)	"Con Los Años Que Me Quedan" (1993)	"Tradición" (1993)

Music video
- "Con Los Años Que Me Quedan" on YouTube

"Con Los Años Que Me Quedan" (transl. "With the Years That I Have Left") is a song by Cuban American singer Gloria Estefan from her third studio album, Mi Tierra (1993). The song was written by the artist and her husband Emilio Estefan, with Emilio, Jorge Casas, and Clay Ostwald handling its production. An English-language version titled "If We Were Lovers" was also recorded. It was released as the second single from the album in 1993 by Epic Records. A pop bolero ballad, it speaks of an melancholy lament. The song received positive reactions from music critics, who saw it as one of the best tracks from the album.

Commercially, the song topped the Billboard Hot Latin Songs chart in the United States. The accompanying music video was directed by Alberto Tolot and features the artist reminiscing an old love. "Con Los Años Que Me Quedan" was nominated in the category of Pop Song of the Year at the 1994 Lo Nuestro Awards and was acknowledged as an award-winning song at the 1995 BMI Latin Awards. The song has been covered live by Puerto Rican singer José Feliciano as part of The Latin Recording Academy tribute to Estefan in 2008 and by Mexican artist Thalía for her album Habítame Siempre (2012).

== Background and composition ==
In January 1993, Gloria Estefan announced that she was working on a Spanish-language album titled Mi Tierra. The artist had wanted to record a Spanish-language album reflecting her Cuban heritage since the beginning of her musical career. Before recording in English Estefan and her band performed at Latin nightclubs; she also remembered her grandmother teaching her old Cuban songs. Music had an important role in Estefan's family; her paternal grandmother was a poet, and an uncle played the flute in a salsa band. The singer's desire to record an album in Spanish was also influenced by her son Nayib; she wanted him to recognize his Cuban heritage.

Mi Tierra was produced by Gloria's husband Emilio Estefan, and fellow Miami Sound Machine members Clay Ostwald and Jorge Casas. Recording took place at the Crescent Moon Studios in Miami, Florida. Gloria penned six tracks in the album, including "Con Los Años Que Me Quedan", which she co-wrote with her husband. A pop bolero ballad, it speaks of a "melancholy lament". The tune features Los Tres Caballeros on the background vocals with one of its members Chamín Correa performing the requinto, Cachao on the double bass, Luis Enrique playing percussion, and London Symphony Orchestra on the strings. In the lyrics, Estefan chants: "Con los años que me quedan yo viviré para darte amor borrando cada dolor con besos llenos de pasión como te amé por vez primera." The album booklet translates it as "With the years that I have left, I will live to give you love, I'll erase every hurt, with kisses filled with passion I'll love you like it was the first time." An English-language version, "If We Were Lovers", was also recorded.

== Critical reception and accolades ==
In a retrospective review, Quentin Harrison from Albumism described the song as a "lush, filmic number" and the "most memorable single" of the album. AllMusic editor Jose F. Promis felt it is "among her most compelling" songs, with "beautiful lyrics and guitars augmenting the lovely melodies". He also declared it as one of Estefan's "loveliest and classiest ballads". Upon the release, Larry Flick from Billboard magazine called the song "another sweet moment" from the album. He noted, "Soft but percussive tune gains its depth from acoustic instrumentation and a delicate string arrangement. Estefan is at her loveliest and her most relaxed here". Josef Woodard from Entertainment Weekly remarked that "heartfelt emotionality tinges" "If We Were Lovers". Ron Fell from the Gavin Report commented, "Gloria finds new words to express fresh thoughts, not just a translation from Spanish to English. With her successes as a kinetic musician, it's always nice to have Gloria in such an unplugged and mellow state once in a while."

In his weekly UK chart commentary, James Masterton said that "If We Were Lovers" "tries to be slightly more commercial, its an English re-recording of the album track, paced at a ballroom waltz and is not what you would describe as a pop hit". Alan Jones from Music Week gave the song three out of five, calling it "a lushly orchestrated, atmospheric, guitar-picked Latin delight in strictly ballroom tempo. No dance mixes this time around, but the beauty of the song should win thorugh." Parry Gettelman from Orlando Sentinel felt that "such lovely ballads", as "Con Los Años Que Me Quedan", "find Estefan abandoning melodrama for real color and emotional shading".

"Con Los Años Que Me Quedan" was nominated in the category of Pop Song of the Year at the 6th Annual Lo Nuestro Awards in 1994, but ultimately lost to "Nunca Voy a Olvidarte" by Cristian Castro. It was acknowledged as an award-winning song at the 1995 BMI Latin Awards.

== Promotion and commercial performance ==
"Con los Años Que Me Quedan" was released as the album's second single in 1993 by Epic Records. An accompanying music video was directed by Alberto Tolot and features the artist reminiscing with her old lover. The video won Latin Clip of the Year at the 1994 Billboard Music Video Awards. A re-recording of the song was included on Estefan's 14th studio album Brazil305 (2020), and incorporates Brazilian music. As part of The Latin Recording Academy tribute to Estefan, who was presented with the Person of the Year accolade in 2008, Puerto Rican singer José Feliciano sung a live cover version of "Con los Años Que Me Quedan". In 2012, Mexican singer Thalía recorded a cover version of the track for the album Habítame Siempre. Commercially, it topped the Billboard Hot Latin Songs chart in the United States, becoming her third number one single on the chart. In the UK, the English version peaked at number 40.

== Formats and track listing ==
Promotional single

1. Con Los Años Que Me Quedan – 4:38
2. If We Were Lovers – 4:38

== Personnel ==
Adapted from the Mi Tierra liner notes:

Performance credits

- Cachao – double bass
- Jorge Casas – double bass
- Chamín Correa – guitar, requinto
- Luis Enriquez – percussion
- London Symphony Orchestraz – strings
- Juanito R. Marquez – music arranger, guitar
- Los Tres Caballeros (Chamín Correa, Alejandro Correa, Alfredo Correa) – backing vocalist

== Charts ==
=== Weekly charts ===
Chart performance for "Con Los Años Que Me Quedan"
Chart (1993–1994)	Peak position
Dominican Republic (UPI)	3
El Salvador (UPI)	5
Panama (UPI)	2
Peru (UPI)	5
UK Singles (Official Charts) "If We Were Lovers/Con Los Años Que Me Quedan"	40
US Hot Latin Songs (Billboard)	1

=== Year-end charts ===
1993 year-end chart performance for "Con Los Años Que Me Quedan"
Chart (1993)	Position
US Hot Latin Songs (Billboard)	21

== See also ==
- List of number-one Billboard Hot Latin Tracks of 1993
