= Roberto Blades =

Panamanian Salsa singer

- Born: Roberto Bellido de Luna; 2 July 1962 (age 63) Panama City, Panama
- Genres: Salsa music
- Occupation: singer
- Years active: 1981–present
- Labels: Fania Records

Roberto Blades (born Roberto Bellido de Luna) is a Panamanian Salsa singer. His most popular songs are "Ya No Regreso Contigo", "Lagrimas", "Poquita Fe", "Casco", "Detalles", "El Artista Famoso", "Victima de Afecto", "Flor Dormida" and "Si Estuvieras Conmigo" among many more. He is the younger brother of singer Rubén Blades, the grandson of poet Ricardo Miró, the nephew of sociologist Carmen A. Miró, and the great-nephew of poet Amelia Denis de Icaza.

In 2002, Roberto Blades won the Grammy Award for Best Salsa Album. He has not released a new album since, preferring to work as a songwriter and producer.

In June 2010, Blades appeared on Dateline NBC to discuss Joran van der Sloot. According to Blades, he witnessed van der Sloot's behavior on the night of the death of Stephany Tatiana Flores Ramírez.
