= Tradición =

Single by Gloria Estefan

from the album Mi Tierra
- Released: October 1993 (United States)
- Recorded: 1992–1993
- Genre: Guaguancó
- Length: 5:20
- Label: Epic
- Songwriters: Emilio Estefan; Gloria Estefan

Gloria Estefan singles chronology
"Con Los Años Que Me Quedan" (1993)	"Tradición" (1993)	"Montuno" (1993)

"Tradición" ("Tradition") is a song by Cuban American singer and songwriter Gloria Estefan. It was released in 1993, by Epic Records, as the third single from her first all Spanish-language album, Mi Tierra (1993). The song is heavily influenced by African and Cuban rhythms, and became the first song by Estefan to top the US Billboard Hot Dance Club Play chart, even though it was a Spanish language song. The single was released as a CD single and CD maxi, but some promotional singles were sent to clubs, the main reason why the song went to number-one on that chart for two weeks (the last week of December 1993 and the first week of January 1994).

== Critical reception ==
Larry Flick from Billboard magazine wrote, "A moment from her lovely Mi Tierra set has been goosed into a rousing tribal/house anthem (thanks to Tommy Musto's inspired remixes), complete with brassy horns and rumbling backing chants. An irresistible call to the floor that will leave most breathless." The Daily Vault's Mark Millan picked "Tradicion" as his favourite from the album and added "which is exactly that: a traditional acoustic-style song that Estefan revels in; she would use this formula as a template for her stunning 1996 album Destiny."

== Official versions ==
=== Original versions ===
1. Album Version — 5:20

=== Remixes ===
1. Glorious Tribal Mix - 6:22
2. Musto Traditional Mix - 5:20
3. Glorious Chants Dub Mix - 4:18
4. Musto Suburban Dub - 7:35

== Formats and track listings ==
Formats and track listings of major single releases of "Tradición":

- US CD maxi single (49K 77192)
1. "Tradición" (Album Version)
2. "Tradición" (Glorious Tribal Mix)
3. "Tradición" (Musto Traditional Mix)
4. "If We Were Lovers/Con Los Años Que Me Quedan" (Spanglish Version)
5. "Mi Tierra" (Hustlers Convention Remix)
6. "Dr. Beat" (Up-Town Full Length Disco Remix)

== Charts ==
Chart (1993)	Peak position
UK Club Chart (Music Week)	24
US Dance Club Songs (Billboard)	1
US Maxi-Singles Sales (Billboard)	33

== See also ==
- Number-one dance hits of 1993 (USA)
