= Mi Tierra =

Studio album by Gloria Estefan
- Released: June 22, 1993
- Studios: Crescent Moon Studios in Miami, Florida
- Genres: son montuno; guaguancó; danzón; bolero
- Length: 55:18
- Language: Spanish
- Label: Epic
- Producers: Emilio Estefan Jr.; Jorge Casas; Clay Ostwald

Gloria Estefan chronology
Greatest Hits (1992)	Mi Tierra (1993)	Christmas Through Your Eyes (1993EN)

Singles from Mi Tierra
- 1. "Mi Tierra" Released: 1993; 2. "Con Los Años Que Me Quedan/If We Were Lovers" Released: September 1993; 3. "Tradición" Released: 1993; 4. "Mi Buen Amor" Released: 1993; 5. "Montuno" Released: 1993; 6. "¡Sí Señor!..." Released: 1994; 7. "Ayer" Released: 1994

Mi Tierra (My Homeland) is the third studio album by Cuban-American recording artist Gloria Estefan, released on June 22, 1993, by Epic Records. Produced by husband Emilio Estefan, it is a Spanish-language album and pays homage to her Cuban roots. The album features Cuban musical genres, including boleros, danzón and son music. Recorded at Crescent Moon Studios in Miami, Florida, Mi Tierra features notable Latin musicians such as Tito Puente, Arturo Sandoval, Cachao López, Chamin Correa and Paquito D'Rivera.

In the United States it was the first record to reach number one on the Billboard Top Latin Albums chart where it spent 58 weeks on top of the chart. The record also peaked at number twenty-seven on the Billboard 200 chart. Mi Tierra has sold over one million copies in the US and Spain. By 2003, it sold over 4 million copies outside of the US. The album received favorable reviews from critics, who praised the album's production, songs and Estefan's vocals. Mi Tierra received several accolades including the Grammy Award for Best Tropical Latin Album in 1994. Seven singles were released from the album, three of which topped the Billboard Hot Latin Songs chart in the US.

== Background and recording ==
Since the beginning of her career, Gloria Estefan desired to record a Spanish-language album reflecting her Cuban heritage. Music had an important role in Estefan's family; her paternal grandmother was a poet, and an uncle played the flute in a salsa band. The singer's desire to record an album in Spanish was also influenced by her son, Nayib; she wanted him to recognize his Cuban heritage. In an interview with Waterloo Region Record on January 1993, Estefan announced that she was working on a Spanish-language album with the musical style borrowing from Afro-Cuban during the 1930s.

Recording for the album primarily took place at the Crescent Moon Studios in Miami, Florida while some of it was recorded in Madrid, Spain, and London, England, and was produced by Estefan's husband, Emilio Estefan, and fellow Miami Sound Machine members Clay Ostwald and Jorge Casas. The title of the album, Mi Tierra, was announced on May of the same year. The album's cover features Estefan in a black-and-white photo at a Havana-style nightclub before the Cuban Revolution.

== Musical styles and compositions ==
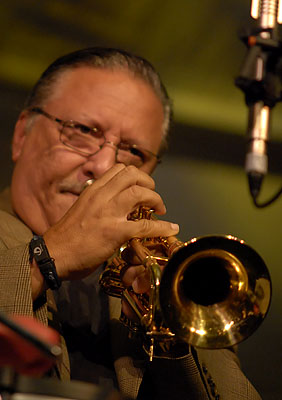
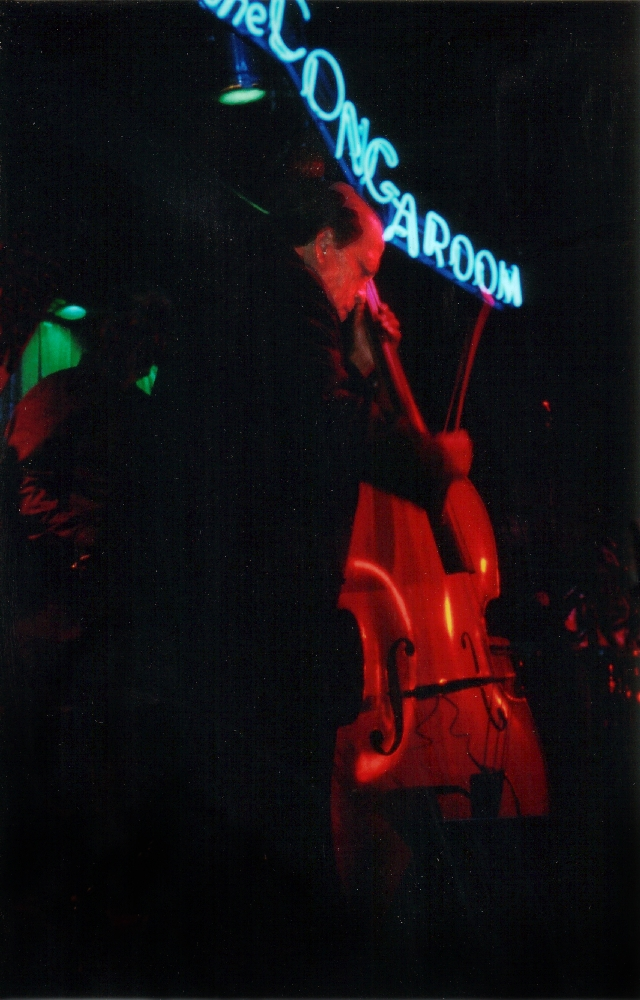
Cuban musicians Arturo Sandoval (left) and Cachao (right) were among the notable Latin musicians who contributed to the album's musical style.

Mi Tierra consists of twelve original tracks and draws inspiration from the 1930s and 1940s-era of Cuban music such as son montuno, guaguancó, danzón, and bolero. The record features notable Latin musicians, including Nestor Torres, Cachao López, Paquito Hechavarría, Chamín Correa, Paquito D'Rivera, Arturo Sandoval, Luis Enrique and Tito Puente. Additional performers include Sheila E. and the London Symphony Orchestra. Fellow Cuban songstress Celia Cruz was invited to perform, but was unable to do so because of her touring schedule.

The opening track on the album, "Con Los Años Que Me Quedan" ("With the Years I Have Left"), is a bolero song that speaks of a "melancholy lament". On the title track, the artist yearns for "love and longing for the old country" and features a montuno arrangement. Both tracks were originally written in English. On "Ayer" ("Yesterday"), is bolero-son music track about a "hoped- for reconciliation between two lovers". The danzonete ballad, "Mi Buen Amor" tells of a "romantic ode". "No Hay Mal Que Por Bien No Venga" ("Out of All Bad, Some Good Things Come") is another danzón that recalls a brief love affair.

"¡Sí Señor" ("Yes Sir... It's My S-O-N") is performed as a traditional son. The track, "Montuno", takes its name from the son montuno genre. Two other bolero tracks on the album include "Volverás" ("You'll Be Back"), and "Hablas de Mí" ("You're Talking About Me"), with the themes of both songs about "melancholy love affairs". "Hablemos El Mismo Idioma" ("Let's Speak The Same Language") is a Latino pride anthem, that speaks of a "spirited call for unity of all Latins". The album closes with "Tradición" ("Traditional"), which is performed as a guaguancó.

== Promotion ==
Mi Tierra was released worldwide on June 22, 1993. To promote Mi Tierra, Estefan made appearances on several talk shows including Entertainment Tonight, The Joan Rivers Show, The Arsenio Hall Show. A documentary about the album was aired on Univision. She performed the title track at the 36th Annual Grammy Awards in 1994, which David Howell of the Edmonton Journal praised as one of the best performances at the award ceremony. However, Estefan did not embark on a promotional tour for the album as she was focusing on being pregnant for the second time following her recovery from a bus accident three years ago.

=== Singles ===
"Mi Tierra" was released as the lead single released from the album. In the US, it reached number one on the Billboard Hot Latin Songs chart and number five on the Billboard Hot Dance Club Songs chart. In Europe, the song peaked at number seventy-seven on the Media Control charts in Germany, twenty-seventh on the Mega Single Top 100 chart in Netherlands and thirty-sixth on the UK Singles Chart. The accompanying music video was directed by Alberto Tolot and features Estefan performing the song in a nightclub along with several musicians in the background. The second single, "Con Los Años Que Me Quedan", was released on September 1993 and also reached number one on the Hot Latin Songs chart in the US. An English version, "If We Were Lovers", was released as a single and peaked at number forty on the UK Singles Chart.It music video, also directed by Tolot, features the artist reminiscing with her old lover.

The third single, "Tradición", reached number one the Hot Dance Clubs chart in the US. "Mi Buen Amor", became the third single to reach number one single on the Hot Latin Songs chart in the US. The music video for "Mi Buen Amor" was co-directed by Emilio, which marked his debut as music video director, and Mo Fitzgibbon. It features Estefan in an empty ballroom. "Montuno" was released in Europe, peaking at number fifty-five on the UK Singles chart. Also released in Europe, "¡Sí Señor!..." peaked at number forty-four on the Mega Single Top 100 chart in the Netherlands. "Ayer" was released as the album's seventh single and peaked at number five on the Hot Latin Songs chart in the US. "Volverás" was released as a promotional single in Mexico in 1994.

== Critical reception ==
Professional ratings
Review scores
Source	Rating
AllMusic	4/5 stars
Chicago Tribune	4/4 stars
Knoxville News Sentinel	4/5 stars
Music Week	4/5 stars
Orlando Sentinel	4/5 stars
The Scranton Times-Tribune	3.5/4 stars

Jose F. Promis of AllMusic calling Mi Tierra "one of [Estefan's] most satisfying", complimenting it as a "breezy, sunny album with moments of melancholy," and "one of her most consistent albums to date." An editor for Billboard surmised that the album will have the artist's "legion of knowing fans will eagerly scoop up her urgent confessionals of bittersweet romantic situations, aswell as her dramatic tales of Cuba's rich musical heritage". Chicago Tribune reviewer Achy Obejas praised it as "dispensing with the brash sound of more contemporary salsa" and lauded Emilio Estefan for the album's production. The Baltimore Sun critic JD Considine wrote positive a positive review of the album stating "[n]ot only is the music wonderfully authentic in its blend of richly rhythmic dance tunes and gently percolating ballads" and stated the artist "never sounded better".

Anne Hurley of Entertainment Weekly proclaimed that the album "will whirl you through an intoxicating landscape of traditional Cuban rhythms and aromatic flavors," and lauded the guest musicians on the album. In a positive review of the album, Parry Gettelman of the Orlando Sentinel gave Mi Tierra commended it as "uncompromising, offering up songs and arrangements firmly rooted in Cuban traditions." She compared it to Estefan's earlier recordings with the Miami Sound Machine, including her musical style and songwriting: "She ditches the synths and employs the London Symphony Orchestra's strings to graceful effect...abandoning melodrama for real color and emotional shading." John Lannert described Mi Tierra for the Sun-Sentinel as "Estefan's Latin 'unplugged' album" and her "most satisfying effort to date".

The Music Week reviewer Alan Jones remarked that Estefan made "no concessions" to the pop-oriented audience as the artist "gloriously revisits her roots". Chuck Campbell wrote for the Knoxville News Sentinel describing Mi Tierra as a "lush all-Spanish album that beautifully exposes the Cuban-American singer's roots". However, Campbell criticized the "forgettable schmaltzy" tracks such as "Mi Buen Amor" and "Hablas de Mi". Despite this, he found the album "thoroughly enjoyable". The Newsday freelance writer Ed Morales complimented the uptempo numbers as the album's best tracks, notably the son montunos, guaguancos, and danzons. Morales stated that the album's only flaw are the "occasional droopy" boleros.

Tom Moon of the Scranton Times-Tribune opened the review of the album by stating: "At first glance, Mi Tierra looks like another Linda Ronstadt-style exercise in cultural leapfrog, in which pop singer Gloria Estefan forgos her usual Karen Carpenter-style ballads for a whirl in the Miami ballrooms of a bygone era", but remarked that the singer's "keen compositional sense ensures that each has a hook, and that arrangements have enough ensemble juice and solo inspiration to remain exciting from start to finish". Although Moon noted that the album is not a "salsa dance party" due to the number of ballads, it "displays energy that's been missing from South Florida's Latin music community since mid '80s and the heyday of the Miami Sound". In a favorable review of Mi Tierra, Allen Howie wrote for the Courier Journal that the record is not "just a collection of pop songs sung in Spanish. Rather, it is an authentic tribute to the singer's Cuban roots, putting a '90s sheen on musical styles that were prevalent in Cuba during the 1920s and '30s". He praised the musical style in the record as "irresistible as it is diverse" and Estefan's vocals as "silky".

Mario Tarradell of the Miami Herald commended the tracks for being original compositions and for capturing "the sound of yesterday" and warping "it in the recording technologies of today". Tarradell concluded "[t]here isn't a bad song in the set" and highlighted "Hablemos El Mismo Idioma" and "Tradicion". In contrast to the other reviews, The Morning Call editor Clarence Elie-Rivera was not impressed with the record; he was critical of the "syrupy collection" of ballads. Elie-Rivera also opined of a "contradiction" on the album cover, noting that despite the yearning for nostalgia, the musical contributions from Afro-Cubans at that time would not have been successful due to their skin color. The reviewer felt the only song on the record he enjoyed was the title track.

=== Accolades ===
At the 36th Annual Grammy Awards in 1994, Mi Tierra won the Grammy Award for Best Tropical Latin Album. At the 6th Annual Lo Nuestro Awards in the same year, it won Tropical Album of the Year. At the inaugural Billboard Latin Music Awards in 1994, Mi Tierra was awarded Tropical/Salsa Album of the Year. At the 1994 Uno Año De Rock awards ceremony in Spain, the record won Best Album. It was recognized as the best-selling Latin album of the year with a 1993–94 NARM Best Seller Award. In 2015, Billboard listed Mi Tierra as one of the Essential Latin Albums of Past 50 Year stating that "[t]hrough son, she transports us to a magical place in the '50s where time stood still on her beloved island".

== Commercial performance ==
In the US, Mi Tierra peaked at number twenty-seven on the Billboard 200 chart. It was the first number-one album on the Billboard Top Latin Albums chart, established on the week of July 10, 1993. The album spent a total of fifty-eight weeks atop the chart, until it was displaced by Selena's album Amor Prohibido (1994) on the week of June 11, 1994. Mi Tierra was the longest-running number one album on the chart until the record was broken by Bad Bunny's album YHLQMDLG (2020) in 2022. On the Latin Pop Albums subchart, Mi Tierra debuted at number one on the Billboard Latin Pop Albums chart the week of July 10, 1993. However, it was later switched to the Tropical Albums subchart a week later due to a categorization error by the publisher. Mi Tierra spent a total of 94 weeks at number one on the latter chart.

Mi Tierra ended 1994 as the best-selling Latin album of the year in the US. The album was certified 16× platinum by the Recording Industry Association of America in the Latin field, for shipments of 1.6 million copies in the U.S. As of October 2017, it sold 1,232,000 copies in the U.S., making it the sixth bestselling Latin album in the country. According to Billboard, most purchasers did not speak Spanish. In Latin America, the album was certified double platinum in Argentina and triple platinum in Mexico. It sold over 30,000 copies in Chile.

In Europe, Mi Tierra peaked at number fifty-nine in Germany, number nine in the Netherlands, number one in Spain, number twenty-five in Switzerland and number eleven in the United Kingdom. The album was certified 10× platinum in Spain (for shipping one million copies) and certified gold in Switzerland. It also sold 200,000 in England. Mi Tierra was the 60th-best-selling album of the 1990s, and sold over five million copies worldwide (four million outside the US).

== Track listing ==
Official translations provided by Gloria Estefan on the Mi Tierra liner notes.
No.	Title	Writer(s)	Length
1.	"Con Los Años Que Me Quedan" (With the Years That I Have Left)	Emilio Estefan Jr.; Gloria Estefan	4:36
2.	"Mi Tierra" (My Homeland)	E. Estefan; Estéfano	4:38
3.	"Ayer" (Yesterday)	Juanito R. Marquez	5:17
4.	"Mi Buen Amor" (My True Love)	E. Estefan; Estéfano	3:50
5.	"Tus Ojos" (Your Eyes)	E. Estefan; Estéfano	4:11
6.	"No Hay Mal Que por Bien No Venga" (Out of All Bad, Some Good Things Come)	E. Estefan; G. Estefan; Israel "Cachao" López; Jon Secada	5:28
7.	"¡Sí Señor!..." (Yes Sir, It's "My S-O-N")	Marquez	4:40
8.	"Volverás" (You'll Be Back)	G. Estefan; Rafael Ferro	3:55
9.	"Montuno"	Marquez	4:57
10.	"Hablemos el Mismo Idioma" (Let's Speak the Same Language)	E. Estefan; G. Estefan	4:45
11.	"Hablas de Mí" (You're Talking About Me)	Jorge Luis Piloto	3:40
12.	"Tradición" (Tradition)	E. Estefan; G. Estefan	5:21
Total length:			55:18

== Personnel ==
Credits adapted from Allmusic and the Mi Tierra liner notes.

=== Performers ===
- Randy Barlow – arranger, trumpet, background vocals
- Rafael "Felo" Barrio – timbales
- Cachao – arranger, bajo sexto, bass guitar
- Jorge Casas – arranger, bajo sexto, bass guitar, background vocals, twelve-string guitar, producer, très
- Alejandro Correa, Alfredo Correa – background vocals
- Chamin Correa – guitar, requinto, background vocals
- Paquito D'Rivera – saxophone
- Luis Enrique – bass guitar, percussion, timbales
- Emilio Estefan Jr. – arranger, producer
- Gloria Estefan – arranger, background vocals, lead vocals
- Estéfano – arranger
- Nelson González – bass guitar, percussion, très
- Paquito Hechavarría – piano
- Sebastian Krys
- London Symphony Orchestra – strings
- Juanito Márquez – guitar
- Teddy Mulet – arranger, trombone, trumpet, background vocals
- Alfredo Oliva – viola
- Jorge Orbon, Robert Basso, Max Teppich, Alexander Prilutchi – violin
- Clay Ostwald – arranger, piano, producer, timbales
- Rafael Padilla – bass, percussion
- Tito Puente – congas, timbales
- Cheíto Quinonez – trumpet, background vocals
- Serena Radaelli – estilista
- Roberto Luis Rodriguez, Arturo Sandoval – trumpet
- Jon Secada – background vocals
- Sheila E. – congas, timbales
- Jorge Sicre – cello
- Debbie Spring – charango, cuerda, viola, violin
- Néstor Torres – flute

=== Technical ===
- Mike Couzzi – mixing
- Nancy Donald – art direction
- Charles Dye – engineer
- Pablo Flores – mixing
- Geoff Foster – assistant
- Noel Harris – assistant
- Mark Krieg – assistant
- Patrice Wilkinson Levinsohn – engineer
- Bob Ludwig – mastering
- Frank Miret – engineer
- Lance Phillips – assistant
- Phil Ramone – mixing
- Andrew Roshberg – assistant
- Eric Schilling – engineer, mixing
- Ron Taylor – engineer
- Alberto Tolot – photography
- Francesca Tolot – make-Up
- Christine Wilson – design
- Javier Vacas – assistant

== Charts ==
=== Weekly charts ===
Weekly chart performance for Mi Tierra
Chart (1993–96)	Peak position
Australian Albums (ARIA)	81
Dutch Albums (Album Top 100)	9
European Albums (Music & Media)	20
German Albums (Media Control)	59
Spanish Albums (PROMUSICAE)	1
Swiss Albums (Schweizer Hitparade)	25
UK Albums (Official Charts)	11
US Billboard 200	27
US Top Latin Albums (Billboard)	1
US Tropical Albums (Billboard)	1
US Cashbox Top Pop Albums	26

=== All-time charts ===
All-time chart performance for Mi Tierra
Chart (1985–1994)	Position
US Tropical Albums (Billboard)	2
Chart (2018)	Position
US Top Latin Albums (Billboard)	1

=== Year-end charts ===
1993 year-end chart performance for Mi Tierra
Chart (1993)	Position
Dutch Albums (Album Top 100)	48
Spanish Albums (AFYVE)	1
US Tropical Albums (Billboard)	3

1994 year-end chart performance for Mi Tierra
Chart (1994)	Position
US Top Latin Albums (Billboard)	1
US Tropical Albums (Billboard)	1

1995 year-end chart performance for Mi Tierra
Chart (1995)	Position
US Top Latin Albums (Billboard)	6
US Tropical Albums (Billboard)	1

1996 year-end chart performance for Mi Tierra
Chart (1996)	Position
US Top Latin Albums (Billboard)	10
US Tropical Albums (Billboard)	2

== Certifications and sales ==
Region	Certification	Certified units/sales
Argentina (CAPIF)	2× Platinum	120,000^{^}
Chile	—	30,000
Japan	—	11,650
Mexico (AMPROFON)	3× Platinum	1,000,000
Netherlands (NVPI)	Platinum	100,000^{^}
Spain (Promusicae)	10× Platinum	1,000,000
Switzerland (IFPI Switzerland)	Gold	25,000^{^}
United Kingdom	—	200,000
United States (RIAA)	16× Platinum (Latin)	1,232,000
Summaries
Worldwide	—	5,200,000 (Note: According to Billboard magazine, Mi Tierra sold over 1.2 million copies in the US and another 4 million in the rest of the world.)
^{^} Shipments figures based on certification alone.

== See also ==
- 1993 in Latin music
- List of best-selling albums in Mexico
- List of best-selling albums in Spain
- List of best-selling Latin albums
- List of best-selling Latin albums in the United States
- List of Billboard Latin Pop Albums number ones from the 1990s
- List of number-one Billboard Top Latin Albums from the 1990s
- List of Billboard Tropical Albums number ones from the 1990s
- List of number-one albums of 1993 (Spain)
- List of number-one albums of 1994 (Spain)
- Music of Cuba
