= Monchy & Alexandra discography =

- Studio albums: 3
- Live albums: 2
- Compilation albums: 3
- Singles: 11
- Music videos: 7
- Remix albums: 1

Monchy & Alexandra were a bachata musical group from the Dominican Republic. They sang together as a duo in the period 1998 to 2008. Their discography consists of three studio albums, three compilation albums, two live albums and ten singles.

The duo released their debut studio single Hoja En Blanco in 1999. The debut album was released in 1999 and was named after the debut single. Upon the success of the lead single, it made its way to number thirteen on the Billboard Tropical/Salsa Airplay chart. Confesiones, the duo's follow-up effort was released in 2002 and produced two top-ten singles on the Tropical/Salsa Airplay chart: "Te Quiero Igual Que Ayer" and "Dos Locos," with the former reaching the number two position. The album peaked at number eight and number two on the Billboard Top Latin Albums and Billboard Tropical/Salsa Albums charts, respectively.

2003 saw the release of their first remix album, The Mix. It reached number fifty on the Top Latin Albums chart and number five on the Tropical Albums chart. It featured one single, "Polos Opuesto" which reached the top ten of the Tropical/Salsa Airplay chart, peaking at number seven.

Monchy & Alexandra's final studio album, Hasta El Fin (2004) became their first album to enter the Billboard 200 when it entered at number 193. It peaked at number seven on the Top Latin Albums chart, giving the duo their first number-one album on the Tropical/Salsa Albums chart. It produced two singles, "Perdidos" and "Hasta El Fin," both of which made it to the top five of the Tropical/Salsa Airplay chart. "Perdidos" lead the chart for seven weeks in 2004, while leading for another eight weeks in 2005. It became their first single to enter the Billboard Hot 100, peaking at number ninety-two. It also reached the number three position on the Billboard Hot Latin Songs chart.

In 2006, the duo released a greatest hits compilation, Éxitos y Más. The album entered the Billboard 200 at number 181, peaking within the top ten of both the Top Latin Albums and Tropical Albums charts. "No Es Una Novela" was released as single for the album, giving the duo their second number-one on the Tropical Songs chart.

In 2019, Monchy & Alexandra appeared as featured artists on American singer Romeo Santos' fourth studio album Utopia.

== Albums ==
=== Studio albums ===
List of studio albums, with selected chart positions, sales figures, and certifications
Title	Album details	Peak chart positions				Sales
Title	Album details	US	US Heat	US Latin	US Trop.	Sales
Hoja En Blanco	Released: 1999; Label: JVM Musical; Format: CD, cassette, digital download	—	—	—	—	
Confesiones	Released: March 12, 2002; Label: J&N Records; Format: CD, cassette, digital download	—	47	8	2	US: 200,000+
Hasta El Fin	Released: October 19, 2004; Label: J&N Records; Format: CD, digital download	193	12	7	1	US: 184,000+
"—" denotes a title that did not chart, or was not released in that territory.

=== Compilation albums ===
List of compilation albums, with selected chart positions and certifications
Title	Album details	Peak chart positions				Sales
Title	Album details	US	US Heat	US Latin	US Trop.	Sales
Éxitos & Más	Released: March 28, 2006; Label: J&N Records; Format: CD, digital download	181	6	9	1	
1	Released: March 17, 2015; Label: J&N Records; Format: Digital download	—	—	—	—	
Dos Locos	Released: June 14, 2019; Label: J&N Records; Format: Digital download	—	—	—	—	
"—" denotes a title that did not chart, or was not released in that territory.

=== Remix albums ===
List of compilation albums, with selected chart positions and certifications
Title	Album details	Peak chart positions		Sales
Title	Album details	US Latin	US Trop.	Sales
The Mix	Released: June 10, 2003; Label: J&N Records; Format: CD, digital download	50	5	

=== Live albums ===
List of live albums, with selected chart positions and certifications
Title	Album details	Peak chart positions		Sales
Title	Album details	US Latin	US Trop.	Sales
Unplugged	Released: November 21, 2000; Label: J&N Records; Format: CD, cassette, digital download	—	—	
En Vivo Desde Bellas Artes	Released: May 20, 2008; Label: Sony BMG; Format: CD, digital download	22	2	
"—" denotes a title that did not chart, or was not released in that territory.

== Singles ==
=== As lead artists ===
List of singles as lead artists, with selected chart positions, showing year released and album name
Title	Year	Peak chart positions					Album
Title	Year	US	US Latin	US Trop.	US Latin Pop	US Latin Rhythm	Album
"Hoja En Blanco"	1999	—	—	13	—	—	Hoja En Blanco
"Pasión"	2000	—	—	—	—	—	Hoja En Blanco
"Te Quiero Igual Que Ayer"	2002	—	21	2	—	—	Confesiones
"Dos Locos"	2003	—	43	7	—	—	Confesiones
"Polo Opuesto"	2003	—	—	7	—	—	The Mix
"Perdidos"	2004	92	3	1	10	—	Hasta El Fin
"Hasta El Fin"	2004	—	25	5	22	—	Hasta El Fin
"Tu Sin Mi y Yo Sin Ti"	2005	—	—	19	—	—	Hasta El Fin
"No Es Una Novela"	2006	—	29	1	—	32	Èxitos y Más
"Cuando Zarpa El Amor"	2008	—	—	36	—	—	Non-album single
"Años Luz" (with Romeo Santos)	2019	–	–	– (Note: "Años Luz" did not enter the Billboard Tropical Songs chart, but peaked at number 13 on the Billboard Tropical Digital Songs Sales chart.)	–	–	Utopia
"—" denotes a title that did not chart, or was not released in that territory.

=== As featured artists ===
List of singles as featured artists, with selected chart positions, showing year released and album name
Title	Year	Peak chart positions			Album
Title	Year	US Latin	US Trop.	US Latin Rhythm	Album
"La Otra" (with Ilegales)	2007	17	2	6	La Republica

== Album appearances ==
Year	Title	Artist	Album
2000	"Palomita Blanca"	Various Artists	Bachatazos Del 2001
2003	"Con un nudo en la Garganta"	Memin	Y Sus Invitados
2004	"Comentarios"	La Hill	Boricua de Cora
2005	"He Venido a Pedirte Perdon"	Alvaro Torres	Interpreta a Juan Gabriel
2006	"Dame una Noche"	Don Miguelo	Contra El Tiempo
2006	"La Otra"	Ilegales	La Republica
2019	"Años Luz"	Romeo Santos	Utopia
