= Elvis Crespo discography =

- Studio albums: 10
- Live albums: 1
- Compilation albums: 4
- Singles: 19

This is a comprehensive listing of official releases by Elvis Crespo, a Puerto Rican merengue singer. Elvis Crespo has released 10 studio albums, 19 singles, and many music videos in the record label Sony BMG.

== Albums ==
=== Studio albums ===
Title	Album details	Peak chart positions			Sales	Certifications
Title	Album details	US	US Latin	US Trop.	Sales	Certifications
Suavemente	Released: April 14, 1998; Label: Sony Music Latin	106	1	1	WW: 2,000,000	AMPROFON: Platinum+Gold; CAPIF: 2× Platinum; RIAA: 26× Platinum (Latin)
Píntame	Released: May 4, 1999; Label: Sony Discos	49	1	1	WW: 300,000	AMPROFON: Gold; CAPIF: Platinum; RIAA: Gold
Wow Flash!	Released: November 21, 2000; Label: Sony Discos	—	5	1	WW: 300,000	RIAA: Platinum (Latin)
Urbano	Released: May 21, 2002; Label: Sony Discos	—	4	1	WW: 400,000	RIAA: Platinum (Latin)
Saboréalo	Released: September 28, 2004; Label: Ole Music	171	3	1	US: 75,000; WW: 200,000	
Regresó el Jefe	Released: June 5, 2007; Label: Machete Music	—	17	2	US: 80,000; WW: 150,000	
Indestructible	Released: December 14, 2010; Label: NuLife Entertainment	—	8	3		
Los Monsters	Released: May 1, 2012; Label: Flash Music	—	24	3		
One Flag	Released: January 1, 2013; Label: Flash Music	—	43	7		
Tatuaje	Released: January 1, 2015; Label: Flash Music	—	7	2		

=== Compilation albums ===
Title	Album details	Peak chart positions			Sales	Certifications
Title	Album details	US	US Latin	US Trop.	Sales	Certifications
The Remixes	Released: December 14, 1999; Label: Sony Discos	155	2	12	WW: 400,000	RIAA: Platinum (Latin)
Greatest Hits	Released: November 12, 2002	—	45	3		
Suavemente... Los Éxitos	Released: October 14, 2008; Label: Sony Music Latin	—	—	9		
Mis Favoritas	Released: August 2, 2010; Label: Sony Music Latin	—	—	10		

=== Live albums ===
Title	Album details	Peak chart positions	
Title	Album details	US Latin	US Trop.
Elvis Crespo Lives: Live From Las Vegas	Released: December 16, 2008	65	5

== Singles ==
Title	Year	Peak chart positions			Album
Title	Year	US Latin	US Trop.	SPA	Album
Suavemente	1998	1	1	—	Suavemente
Tu Sonrisa	1998	1	1	—	Suavemente
Luna Llena	1998	26	11	—	Suavemente
Nuestra Canción	1998	—	17	—	Suavemente
Píntame	1999	2	1	7	Píntame
Por El Caminito	1999	23	7	—	Píntame
Tiemblo	1999	10	2	12	Píntame
Wow! Flash	2000	10	1	—	Wow! Flash
Mi Sol, Mi Luna	2000	38	7	—	Wow! Flash
"La Noche"	2000	34	8	—	Wow! Flash
Bandida	2002	12	2	—	Urbano
Bésame en la Boca	2002	49	10	—	Urbano
La Cerveza	2002	—	8	—	Urbano
7 Días	2004	—	8	—	Saboréalo
Hora Enamorada	2005	13	1	—	Hora Enamorada
Pan Comio	2005	—	14	—	Hora Enamorada
Échate Pa' Ca (ft. Grupo Mania)	2006	—	24	—	Regresó el Jefe
La Foto se me Borró	2007	31	1	—	Regresó el Jefe
Lloré y Lloré	2007	—	14	—	Regresó el Jefe
Me Gusta, Me Gusta	2009	47	7	—	Elvis Crespo Lives: Live from Las Vegas
15 Inviernos	2010	35	9	—	Indestructible
La Novia Bella	2011	40	8	—	Indestructible
Vallenato en karaoke	2011	37	5	—	
Yo no soy un monstruo (featuring Ilegales)	2012	1	1	—	Los Monsters
Pegaito suavecito (featuring Fito Blanko)	2012	6	1	—	One Flag
Sopa de Caracol (featuring Pitbull)	2013	—	1	—	One Flag
Napoleona (with Deorro and IAmChino)	2021	—	—	—	Non-album single
"—" denotes a recording that did not chart.

=== Guest singles ===
Title	Year	Peak chart positions				Album
Title	Year	US Latin	US Trop.	ITA	SPA	Album
"Para Darte Mi Vida" (Milly Quezada ft. Elvis Crespo)	1998	4	2	—	—	Vive
"El Cuerpo Me Pide" (Víctor Manuelle ft. Elvis Crespo)	1998	4	1	—	—	Tarjeta de Navidad, Vol. 2
"Come Baby Come" (Gizelle D'Cole ft. Elvis Crespo)	1999	21	7	—	—	Gizelle D'Cole
"Bailar" (Deorro ft. Elvis Crespo)	2016	8	1	40	29	Good Evening
"Azukita" (Steve Aoki and Play-N-Skillz ft. Daddy Yankee and Elvis Crespo)	2018	29	4	58	24	Neon Future III
"La Graciosa" (Quevedo and Elvis Crespo)	2026	—	—	—	1	El Baifo
"—" denotes a recording that did not chart.

== Awards ==
This is a list of awards and nominations of Puerto Rican Merengue artist Elvis Crespo. Here are some of the awards he has won during his musical career.

=== Premio Lo Nuestro ===
1999

- Tropical: Album of the Year (Suavemente)
- Tropical: Male Artist of the Year
- Tropical: Best New Artist
- Tropical: Song of the Year (Suavemente)

2000

- Tropical: Album of the Year (Pintame)
- Tropical: Male Artist of the Year
- Tropical: Song of the Year (Pintame)

2001

- Merengue: Artist of the Year
- People Choice Awards: Tropical Artist of the Year

2003

- Merengue: Artist of the Year

2005

- Merengue: Artist of the Year

=== Grammy Awards ===
1999

- Best Merengue Performance (Pintame)

=== Latin Grammys ===
2005

- Best Merengue Album (Saborealo)
