= En Vivo Desde Bellas Artes =

Live album by Monchy & Alexandra
- Released: May 20, 2008
- Recorded: San Juan, Puerto Rico
- Venue: Luis A. Ferré Performing Arts Center
- Genre: Bachata
- Length: 1:30:54
- Language: Spanish
- Label: J&N Records; JVN Music; Sony BMG Music Entertainment

Monchy & Alexandra chronology
Éxitos & Más (2008)	En Vivo Desde Bellas Artes (2008)

En Vivo Desde Bellas Artes (English: Live From Bellas Artes) is the second live album by Dominican bachata Duo Monchy & Alexandra. It was released on May 20, 2008, by J&N Records, JVN Music, and Sony BMG Music Entertainment. It is based on a concert in a venue called Bellas Artes (Fine Arts) in Puerto Rico. A concert film was also released on DVD.

== Track listing ==
=== CD ===
Disc 1
No.	Title	Length
1.	"Monchy & Alexandra" (Introducción)	3:07
2.	"En Un Dos Por Tres"	5:44
3.	"Eras Diferente"	5:54
4.	"Llorando Penas"	4:39
5.	"Monchy & Alexandra" (Intro #1)	1:18
6.	"Te Quiero Igual Que Ayer"	4:51
7.	"Este Castigo"	5:56
8.	"Polo Opuesto"	4:56
9.	"No Ha Sido Fácil"	5:52
Total length:		42:17

Disc 2
No.	Title	Length
1.	"Interlude"	3:29
2.	"Monchy & Alexandra" (Intro #2)	0:46
3.	"Hoja En Blanco"	6:57
4.	"Monchy & Alexandra" (Hasta El Fin Intro)	0:38
5.	"Hasta El Fin"	4:21
6.	"No Es Una Novela"	5:00
7.	"Monchy & Alexandra" (Perdidos Intro)	1:05
8.	"Perdidos"	4:59
9.	"Monchy & Alexandra" (Pasión Intro)	0:30
10.	"Pasión"	6:34
11.	"Monchy & Alexandra" (Dos Locos Intro)	0:38
12.	"Dos Locos"	6:43
13.	"Monchy & Alexandra" (Encore)	0:42
14.	"Hoja En Blanco"	6:15
Total length:		48:37

=== DVD ===
No.	Title	Length
1.	"Monchy & Alexandra" (Introducción)	3:07
2.	"En Un Dos Por Tres"	5:44
3.	"Eras Diferente"	5:54
4.	"Llorando Penas"	4:39
5.	"Monchy & Alexandra" (Intro #1)	1:18
6.	"Te Quiero Igual Que Ayer"	4:51
7.	"Este Castigo"	5:56
8.	"Polo Opuesto"	4:56
9.	"No Ha Sido Fácil"	5:52
10.	"Interlude"	3:29
11.	"Monchy & Alexandra" (Intro #2)	0:46
12.	"Hoja En Blanco"	6:57
13.	"Monchy & Alexandra" (Hasta El Fin Intro)	0:38
14.	"Hasta El Fin"	4:21
15.	"No Es Una Novela"	5:00
16.	"Monchy & Alexandra" (Perdidos Intro)	1:05
17.	"Perdidos"	4:59
18.	"Monchy & Alexandra" (Pasión Intro)	0:30
19.	"Pasión"	6:34
20.	"Monchy & Alexandra" (Dos Locos Intro)	0:38
21.	"Dos Locos"	6:43
22.	"Monchy & Alexandra" (Encore)	0:42
23.	"Hoja En Blanco"	6:15
Total length:		1:30:54

== Charts ==
Chart (2008)	Peak Position
US Top Latin Albums (Billboard)	22
US Tropical Albums (Billboard)	2
