= Éxitos y Más =

Greatest hits album by Monchy y Alexandra
- Released: March 28, 2006
- Genre: Bachata
- Length: 1:03:21
- Language: Spanish
- Label: J&N Records; JVN Music; Sony Norte

Monchy y Alexandra chronology
Hasta El Fin (2004)	Éxitos y Más (2006)	En Vivo Desde Bellas Artes (2008)

Singles from Éxitos y Más
- 1. "No Es Una Novela" Released: 2006

Professional ratings
Review scores
Source	Rating
Allmusic	3.5/5 stars

Éxitos y Más (English: Hits and More) is a greatest hits album by Monchy y Alexandra. The album consists of songs from all of their albums including three new songs: "No Es Una Novela", "Corazón Prendido", and "Te Regalo". The album was released on DualDisc.

== Track listing ==
CD Side
No.	Title	Length
1.	"No Es Una Novela"	3:41
2.	"Perdidos"	4:27
3.	"Corazón Prendido"	3:41
4.	"Dos Locos"	4:06
5.	"Te Regalo"	4:38
6.	"Hasta El Fin"	4:13
7.	"Hoja En Blanco"	5:07
8.	"Te Quiero Igual Que Ayer"	4:19
9.	"Pasión"	5:11
10.	"Tu Sin Mi y Yo Sin Ti"	3:42
11.	"No Ha Sido Fácil"	4:43
12.	"Cuando No Se Puede Olvidar"	4:17
13.	"En Un Dos Por Tres"	3:51
14.	"Ven, Dime Como Hago"	4:00
15.	"De Olvidarla Me Olvidé"	3:21
Total length:		1:03:21

== Charts ==
=== Weekly charts ===
Chart (2006)	Peak Position
US Billboard 200	181
US Top Latin Albums (Billboard)	9
US Tropical Albums (Billboard)	1

=== Year-end charts ===
Chart (2006)	Position
US Top Latin Albums (Billboard)	29
US Tropical Albums (Billboard)	3

== See also ==
- List of number-one Billboard Tropical Albums from the 2000s
