= List of Billboard Tropical Albums number ones from the 2000s =

The Billboard Tropical Albums chart, published in Billboard magazine, is a record chart that features Latin music sales information in regard to tropical music. The data is compiled by Nielsen SoundScan from a sample that includes music stores, music departments at electronics and department stores, Internet sales (both physical and digital) and verifiable sales from concert venues in the United States.

== Number one albums ==
Key

† – Best-selling Latin album of the year

Artist	Album	Reached number one	Weeks at number one
Marc Anthony	Desde un principio: From the Beginning	1 January 2000	16
Son by Four	Son by Four	15 April 2000	8
Gloria Estefan	Alma Caribeña	10 June 2000	7
Son by Four	Son by Four	29 July 2000	22
Artist	Album	Reached number one	Weeks at number one
Son By Four	Son by Four	6 January 2001	2
Elvis Crespo	Wow! Flash	20 January 2001	1
Son By Four	Son By Four	27 January 2001	2
Various Artists	Bachatahits 2001	10 February 2001	1
Víctor Manuelle	Instinto y Deseo	17 February 2001	1
Son By Four	Son By Four	24 February 2001	2
Juan Luis Guerra	Coleccion Romantica	10 March 2001	4
Jerry Rivera	Rivera	7 April 2001	2
Various Artists	Bachatahits 2001	21 April 2001	1
Huey Dunbar	Yo Si Me Enamoré	28 April 2001	1
Grupo Manía	Mania 2050	5 May 2001	2
Gilberto Santa Rosa	Intenso	19 May 2001	2
Various Artists	Bachatahits 2001	2 June 2001	7
El General	El General Is Back	21 June 2001	2
Olga Tañón	Yo Por Ti	4 August 2001	7
Melina León	Corazon de Mujer	22 September 2001	1
Olga Tañón	Yo Por Ti	29 September 2001	3
DJ Blass	Sandungero	20 October 2001	1
Olga Tañón	Yo Por Ti	27 October 2001	1
Gisselle	8	3 November 2001	3
Carlos Vives	Déjame Entrar	24 November 2001	2
Marc Anthony	Libre	8 December 2001	4
Artist	Album	Reached number one	Weeks at number one
Marc Anthony	Libre	5 January 2002	22
Elvis Crespo	Urbano	8 June 2002	5
El Gran Combo de Puerto Rico	40 Aniversario En Vivo	13 July 2002	2
Elvis Crespo	Urbano	27 July 2002	1
Marc Anthony	Libre	3 August 2002	3
Jerry Rivera	Vuela Muy Alto	24 August 2002	4
Gilberto Santa Rosa	Viceversa	21 September 2002	8
Víctor Manuelle	Le Preguntaba a la Luna	16 November 2002	4
La India	Latin Songbird: Mi Alma Y Corazón	14 December 2002	3
Artist	Album	Reached number one	Weeks at number one
La India	Latin Songbird: Mi Alma Y Corazon	4 January 2003	13
Ibrahim Ferrer	Buenos Hermanos	5 April 2003	15
Celia Cruz	Hits Mix	19 July 2003	4
Celia Cruz	Regalo del Alma	16 August 2003	5
Celia Cruz	Exitos Eternos	20 September 2003	3
Celia Cruz	Regalo del Alma	11 October 2003	1
Celia Cruz	Exitos Eternos	18 October 2003	1
Celia Cruz	Regalo del Alma	25 October 2003	1
Celia Cruz	Exitos Eternos	1 November 2003	9
Artist	Album	Reached number one	Weeks at number one
Celia Cruz	Exitos Eternos	3 January 2004	4
Celia Cruz	Hits Mix	31 January 2004	1
Eddie Dee	12 Discípulos	7 February 2004	2
Ivy Queen	Diva Platinum Edition	21 February 2004	2
Eddie Dee	12 Discípulos	28 February 2004	1
Ivy Queen	Diva Platinum Edition	6 March 2004	2
Víctor Manuelle	Travesía	20 March 2004	9
Elvis Crespo	Saboréalo	22 May 2004	1
Baby Rasta & Gringo	Sentenciados	29 May 2004	1
Elvis Crespo	Saboréalo	5 June 2004	2
Don Omar	The Last Don Live	19 June 2004	5
Luny Tunes	La Trayectoria	24 July 2004	1
Don Omar	The Last Don Live	31 July 2004	2
Marc Anthony	Valió la Pena	14 August 2004	4
Gilberto Santa Rosa	Autentico	11 September 2004	1
Juan Luis Guerra	Para Ti	18 September 2004	7
Monchy & Alexandra	Hasta El Fin	6 November 2004	1
Daddy Yankee	Barrio Fino	13 November 2004	2
Various Artists	Luny Tunes Presents La Mision 4: The Take Over	27 November 2004	1
Daddy Yankee	Barrio Fino	4 December 2004	4
Artist	Album	Reached number one	Weeks at number one
Daddy Yankee	Barrio Fino	1 January 2005	20
Aventura	God's Project	21 May 2005	7
Andy Andy	Ironía	9 June 2005	31
Gilberto Santa Rosa & El Gran Combo de Puerto Rico	Así es Nuestra Navidad	17 December 2005	2
Gilberto Santa Rosa & Víctor Manuelle	Dos Soneros, Una Historia	31 December 2005	1
Artist	Album	Reached number one	Weeks at number one
Gilberto Santa Rosa & Víctor Manuelle	Dos Soneros, Una Historia	7 January 2006	2
Andy Andy	Ironía	21 January 2006	4
La India	Soy Diferente	18 February 2006	3
Andy Andy	Ironía	11 March 2006	3
Gilberto Santa Rosa	Directo al Corazón	1 April 2006	2
Monchy & Alexandra	Éxitos y Más	15 April 2006	6
Víctor Manuelle	Decisión Unánime	27 May 2006	7
Monchy & Alexandra	Éxitos y Más	15 July 2006	2
Marc Anthony	Sigo Siendo Yo (Grandes Exitos)	29 July 2006	10
Aventura	God's Project	7 October 2006	2
Olga Tañón	Soy Como Tu	28 October 2006	3
Aventura	God's Project	18 November 2006	3
Various Artists	Los Cocorocos	9 December 2006	3
El Gran Combo de Puerto Rico	Arroz con Habichuela	23 December 2006	2
Artist	Album	Reached number one	Weeks at number one
Aventura	K.O.B. Live	6 January 2007	12
Juan Luis Guerra	La Llave de Mi Corazon	7 April 2007	5
Aventura	K.O.B. Live	12 May 2007	2
Juan Luis Guerra	La Llave de Mi Corazon	26 May 2007	1
Aventura	K.O.B. Live	2 June 2007	10
Marc Anthony	El Cantante	11 August 2007	8
Gloria Estefan	90 Millas	6 October 2007	7
Various Artists	Bachata #1's	24 November 2007	1
Aventura	Kings of Bachata: Sold Out at Madison Square Garden	1 December 2007	5
Artist	Album	Reached number one	Weeks at number one
Aventura	Kings of Bachata: Sold Out at Madison Square Garden	5 January 2008	28
Víctor Manuelle	Soy	28 June 2008	2
Aventura	Kings of Bachata: Sold Out at Madison Square Garden	12 July 2008	7
Various Artists	Bachata #1's: Vol. 2	30 August 2008	4
Aventura	Kings of Bachata: Sold Out at Madison Square Garden	27 September 2008	4
Víctor Manuelle	La Historia de un Sonero	25 October 2008	1
Buena Vista Social Club	Buena Vista Social Club at Carnegie Hall	1 January 2008	2
Aventura	Kings of Bachata: Sold Out at Madison Square Garden	15 November 2008	4
Xtreme	Chapter Dos	13 December 2008	1
Gilberto Santa Rosa	Una Navidad Con Gilberto	20 December 2008	2
Artist	Album	Reached number one	Weeks at number one
Gilberto Santa Rosa	Una Navidad Con Gilberto	3 January 2009	1
Aventura	Kings of Bachata: Sold Out at Madison Square Garden	10 January 2009	5
Tite Curet Alonso	A Man and His Songs: Alma de Poerta	14 February 2009	1
Aventura	Kings of Bachata: Sold Out at Madison Square Garden	21 February 2009	14
Gilberto Santa Rosa	El Caballero de la Salsa	30 May 2009	1
Luis Enrique	Ciclos	6 June 2009	3
Aventura	The Last	27 June 2009	22
Víctor Manuelle	Yo Mismo	28 November 2009	1
Aventura	The Last	5 December 2009	4
