= The Mix (Monchy & Alexandra album) =

Remix album by Monchy y Alexandra
- Released: June 10, 2003
- Genre: Latin Pop
- Length: 55:30
- Label: J&N Records; JVN Music; Sony Discos

Monchy y Alexandra chronology
Confesiones (2002)	The Mix (2003)	Hasta El Fin (2004)

Singles from The Mix
- 1. "Hoja En Blanco (Reggaeton Version)" Released: 2003; 2. "Polo Opuesto" Released: 2003

The Mix is Monchy & Alexandra's first remix album. It was released on June 10, 2003 under the Sony International label. The album contains music previously released by the artistic duo. The songs however have been mixed to fit other Latino musical genres, such as reggaeton, as well as European musical genres as techno. It also included the song "Polo Opuesto" which was used as the single to promote the album as it was the only song at the time to not be featured in previous albums. The song peaked at number 7 Billboard Tropical Airplay chart.

== Track listing ==
No.	Title	Length
1.	"Polo Opuesto" (Bachata) (Original)	4:00
2.	"Dos Locos" (Pop Mix)	4:12
3.	"En Un Dos Por Tres" (Club Mix)	5:20
4.	"Cuando No Se Puede Olvidar" (Tecno-House)	4:59
5.	"Penas" (Reggaeton)	2:43
6.	"Te Quiero Igual Que Ayer" (Club-Mix)	6:58
7.	"Te Amaría" (Trance)	3:38
8.	"No Puedo Vivir Así" (Dance)	3:31
9.	"Polo Opuesto" (Balada)	4:12
10.	"Hoja En Blanco" (Reggaeton)	6:14
11.	"Este Castigo" (Balada)	4:34
12.	"Pasión" (Reggaeton)	5:13
Total length:		55:30

== Charts ==
Chart (2002)	Peak position
US Top Latin Albums (Billboard)	50
US Tropical Albums (Billboard)	5
