= Viceversa (Gilberto Santa Rosa album) =

Studio album by Gilberto Santa Rosa
- Released: September 3, 2002
- Recorded: 2001–2002
- Studio: EMCA (Santo Domingo, Dominican Republic); O-Zone Studios; Prt Recording Studio; Rolo Studio; Soundtrack (New York City, New York); The Gallery Recording Studios; The Warehouse (Miami, Florida)
- Genre: Salsa
- Length: 60:01
- Label: Sony Discos
- Producer: Gilberto Santa Rosa · José M. Lugo · Kike Santander · Bernardo Ossa

Gilberto Santa Rosa chronology
Intenso (2001)	Viceversa (2002)	Sólo Bolero (2003)

Singles from Viceversa
- 1. "Por Más Qué Intento" Released: 2002; 2. "Un Montón de Estrellas" Released: 2002; 3. "Si Te Dijeron" Released: 2003; 4. "El refrán se te olvidó" Released: 2003

Professional ratings
Review scores
Source	Rating
Allmusic	5/5 stars

Viceversa (English: Viceversa) is the 14th studio album recorded by Puerto Rican salsa singer Gilberto Santa Rosa, It was released by Sony Music Latin on September 3, 2002. The album became his fourth number-one set on the Billboard Tropical Albums chart. The album received a nomination a Latin Grammy Award for Best Salsa Album and the single "Por Más Qué Intento" received a Latin Grammy Award for Best Tropical Song in the 4th Annual Latin Grammy Awards on September 3, 2003.

== Track listing ==
This information adapted from Allmusic.

No.	Title	Writer(s)	Length
1.	"Un Montón de Estrellas"	Linares · Lusafrica	4:33
2.	"Tanto Que Te Quiero"	Jose Luis "Caplis" Chacin	4:28
3.	"Si Te Dijeron (Balada)"	Víctor Manuelle	4:07
4.	"Como el Que No Quiere la Cosa"	Domingo Quiñones	3:38
5.	"Nunca Te He Dicho"	Rafy Monclova	4:29
6.	"No Pensé Enamorarme Otra Vez"	Jorge Luis Piloto	5:19
7.	"Viceversa"	Juan Carlos De La Vega	4:09
8.	"Si Te Dijeron (Salsa)"	Víctor Manuelle	5:19
9.	"Por Más Que Intento (Balada)"	Kike Santander	4:03
10.	"Es Fatal"	Javier Montes	4:33
11.	"Sacúdeme"	Armondo Machores	5:16
12.	"Por Más Que Intento (Salsa)"	Kike Santander	4:44
13.	"El Refrán Se Te Olvidó"	José A. Pinares	5:23

== Personnel ==
- Concert Comedienne - Alfredo Oliva
- Coros, Guest Artist - Andy Montañez
- Trombone - Antonio Vazquez
- Arranger, Engineer, Keyboards, Producer, Programming - Bernardo Ossa
- Arranger - Bobby Valentín
- Engineer - Brian Kinkead
- Violin - Carlos Rodríguez
- Arranger - Cuto Soto
- Violin - David Betancourt
- Guest Artist - Domingo Quiñones
- Mezcla - Dominick Barbera
- Arranger, Direccion De Cuerdas - Ed Calle
- Violin - Enrique Collazo
- Arranger - Ernesto Sanchez
- Cello - Félix Guadalupe
- Assistant - George Rexach
- Contratista - George Rivera
- Trombone - George Torrez
- Coros, Primary Artist - Gilberto Santa Rosa
- Bajo Sexto, Electric Guitar - Gustavo Erazo
- Cello - Harry Almodovar
- Violin - Inoel Jirau
- Coros, Guest Artist - Ismael Miranda
- Assistant - Jaime García
- Trumpet - Jan Duclerc
- Viola - Javier Matos
- Composer - Javier Montes
- Coros - Jerry Rivas
- Congas - Jimmy Morales
- Bajo Sexto - Johnny Torres
- Mezcla - Jon Fausty
- Trombone - Jorge Diaz
- Composer - Jorge Luís Piloto
- Cello - Jose D. De Jesus
- Coros - Josué Rosado
- Trumpet - José "Jochy" Rodríguez
- Arranger, Keyboards, Mezcla, Piano, Producer - José Lugo
- Composer - José Luis "Caplís" Chacín
- Violin - José Vanga
- Engineer - Juan Cristobal Losada
- Engineer - Juan Jose Virviescas
- Bajo Sexto - Junior Irrizary
- Arranger, Composer, Producer - Kike Santander
- Bateria - Lee Levin
- Make-Up - Lucy Ortiz
- Nylon String Guitar - Manny López
- Violin - Marcos Goméz
- Viola - Maria Jose Santiago
- Make-Up - Martha Medina
- Cuerda - Miami Symphonic Strings
- Engineer - Mike Couzzi
- Assistant - Mike Scielzi
- Arranger - Milton Sesenton
- Violin - Omar Velázquez
- Assistant - Oscar Monsalve
- Copista - Osvaldo De La Rosa
- Coros - Osvaldo Roman
- Percussion, Production Assistant, Timbales - Pablo Padín
- Arranger, Engineer - Pedro Rivera Toledo
- Bongos - Rafael "Tito" Echevarria
- Vibraphone - Raúl Rodríguez
- Engineer - Rei Pena
- Violin - Ricardo Mendoza Davila
- Percussion - Richard Bravo
- Bongos - Richie Bastar
- Engineer, Scat - Rolando Alejandro
- Engineer - Ronnie Torres
- Bajo Sexto - Sal Cuevas
- Congas, Guiro - Sammy García
- Production Coordination - Sergio Minski
- Arranger, Trumpet - Tommy Villarini
- Composer, Coros, Guest Artist - Víctor Manuelle
- Viola - Yamil Otero
- Baritone Saxophone, Tenor Saxophone - Ángel Torres

== Chart performance ==
Chart (2002)	Peak position
U.S. Billboard 200	181
U.S. Billboard Top Latin Albums	2
U.S. Billboard Tropical Albums	1
U.S. Billboard Heatseekers Albums	7

== Certification ==
Region	Certification	Certified units/sales
United States (RIAA)	Platinum (Latin)	100,000^{^}
^{^} Shipments figures based on certification alone.

== See also ==
- List of number-one Billboard Tropical Albums from the 2000s
