= Intenso =

Studio album by Gilberto Santa Rosa
- Released: March 6, 2001
- Genre: Salsa
- Label: Sony Discos

Gilberto Santa Rosa chronology
Expresión (1999)	Intenso (2001)	Viceversa (2002)

Singles from Intenso
- 1. "Pero no me ama" Released: May 2001; 2. "Pueden decir" Released: October 2001; 3. "La agarro bajando" Released: February 2002

Professional ratings
Review scores
Source	Rating
Allmusic	3/5 stars

Intenso (Intense) is the thirteenth studio album recorded by Puerto Rican salsa singer Gilberto Santa Rosa released on March 6, 2001. The album became his third number-one set on the Billboard Tropical Albums chart. The album received a Latin Grammy nomination for Best Salsa Album and the single "Pueden decir" received a Latin Grammy nomination for Best Tropical Song.

== Track listing ==
This information adapted from Allmusic.

No.	Title	Writer(s)	Length
1.	"Advertencia"	Víctor Manuel Ruiz	4:35
2.	"Alguna Parte de Ti"	Juan Carlos de la Vega	4:58
3.	"La Agarro Bajando"	Javier Montes Quiles	4:15
4.	"Mentira"	Gustavo Marquez	4:40
5.	"Acechando"	Miguel A. Díaz, José M. Lugo, Gilberto Santa Rosa	3:53
6.	"Pueden Decir (Balada)"	Omar Alfanno	3:32
7.	"Pero No Me Ama"	Rafy Monclova	3:53
8.	"De Colores"	Emilio Regueira	4:12
9.	"Se Puede"	Ramón Rivera	2:51
10.	"Si No lo Digo Ahora"	Jorge Luis Piloto	4:34
11.	"Bailalo"	Puppy Santiago	4:14
12.	"Pueden Decir"	Omar Alfanno	4:12

== Personnel ==
- Trombone- Antonio Vasquez
- Violin - Armen Garabedian
- Guitar - Billy Colon Zayas
- Saxophone - Bob Franceschini
- Violin - Bob Sanov
- Arranger - Bobby Valentin
- Violin - Brian Leonard
- Tres - Charlie Rodriguez
- Cello - Daniel Smith
- Cuatro - Edwin Colon Zayas
- Composer - Emilio Regueira Perez
- Arranger - Ernesto Sanchez
- Background Vocals - Genaro Ramirez
- Music Coordinator - George Rivera
- Composer, Primary Artist, Background Vocals - Gilberto Santa Rosa
- Composer - Gustavo Marquez
- Viola - Harry Shirinian
- Trumpet - Jan Duclerc
- Arranger, String Director - Jeremy Lubbock
- Background Vocals - Jerry Rivas
- Viola - Jimbo Ross
- Congas - Jimmy Morales
- Violin - Joel Derouin
- Engineer - John Kurlander
- Vocals - Johnny Torres
- Engineer - Jon Fausty
- Trombone - Jorge Diaz
- Guitar - Jorge Laboy
- Flugelhorn, Trumpet - Jose Rodriguez
- Background Vocals - Josue Rosado
- Contractor - Jules Chaikin
- Background Vocals - Justo Betancourt
- Arranger - Lenny Prieto
- Arranger - Louis Garcia
- Arranger - Luis Ortiz
- Background Vocals - Luisito Carrion
- Bongos, Congas, Percussion, Timbales - Marc Quiñones
- Violin - Mari Tsumura
- Viola - Marilyn Baker
- Assistant Engineer - Mike Scielzi
- Bass Trombone - Moises Nogueras
- Background Vocals - Nestor Sanchez
- Composer - Omar Alfanno
- Music Copyist, Production Assistant - Osvaldo De La Rosa
- Trombone - Ozzie Melendez
- Violin - Pat Johnson
- Violin - Pat Johnson
- Arranger - Pedro Rivera Toledo
- Violin - Peter Kent
- Guiro, Maracas, Background Vocals - Pichie Perez
- Violin - Pip Clarke-Ling
- Bongos - Rafael "Tito" Echevarria
- Background Vocals - Rafael De Jesus
- Trombone - Raffi Torres
- Engineer - Rei Pena
- Bongos - Richie Bastar
- Alto Flute - Rie Akagi
- Engineer - Rolando Alejandro
- Engineer - Ronnie Torres
- Bass - Ruben Rodriguez
- Bass - Sal Cuevas
- Congas - Sammy Garcia
- Violin - Shari Zippert
- Music Copyist - Steve Juliani
- Cello - Suzie Katayama
- Arranger, Trumpet - Tommy Villarini
- Photography - Tony Vera
- Trumpet - Vicente Cusi Castillo
- Tenor Saxophone - Angel Torres

== Chart performance ==
Chart (2001)	Peak position
U.S. Billboard Top Latin Albums	13
U.S. Billboard Tropical Albums	1
U.S. Billboard Heatseekers Albums	47

== Certification ==
Region	Certification	Certified units/sales
United States (RIAA)	Platinum (Latin)	100,000^{^}
^{^} Shipments figures based on certification alone.

== See also ==
- List of number-one Billboard Tropical Albums from the 2000s
