= Nace Aquí =

Studio album by Gilberto Santa Rosa
- Released: August 6, 1993
- Genre: Salsa
- Length: 55:07
- Label: Sony Discos
- Producer: Gilberto Santa Rosa, Ramon Sanchez

Gilberto Santa Rosa chronology
A Dos Tiempos de un Tiempo (1992)	Nace Aquí (1993)	De Cara al Viento (1994)

Singles from Nace Aquí
- 1. "Sin Voluntad" Released: September 1993; 2. "Buscame" Released: December 1993; 3. "Me Volvieron a Hablar de Ella" Released: February 1994; 4. "Que Manera de Quererte" Released: July 1994

Professional ratings
Review scores
Source	Rating
Allmusic	4/5 stars

Nace Aquí (Spanish for "Born Here") is the eighth studio album recorded by Puerto Rican salsa singer Gilberto Santa Rosa released on August 6, 1993.

== Track listing ==
This information adapted from Allmusic.

No.	Title	Writer(s)	Length
1.	"Sin Voluntad"	Omar Alfanno	5:05
2.	"Incognita"	Enrique Feliz	5:10
3.	"Buscame"	Rigel Tores	4:50
4.	"No Hay Nada Más Importante"	Omar Alfanno	5:00
5.	"Amor de Umbral"	Marisela Verena	4:50
6.	"Mal de Amores"	Pedro Azael	4:53
7.	"Tiene Un Amigo"	Charlie Donato	5:05
8.	"Que Manera de Quererte"	Emilio Rios	5:30
9.	"Bendito Tiempo"	Pedro Azael	5:10
10.	"Me Volvieron a Hablar de Ella"	Omar Alfanno	4:54
11.	"Iman "Ritmo Jala-Jala""	Carlos Olivia	4:40

== Chart performance ==
Chart (1993)	Peak position
U.S. Billboard Top Latin Albums	31
U.S. Billboard Tropical Albums	7

== Certification ==
Region	Certification	Certified units/sales
United States (RIAA)	2× Platinum (Latin)	200,000^{^}
^{^} Shipments figures based on certification alone.
