= Five Hours =

2014 single by Deorro

Single by Deorro
- Released: February 18, 2014
- Genre: EDM *Progressive house * Electro house
- Length: 5:26
- Label: LE7ELS
- Songwriter: Erick Orrosquieta
- Producer: Deorro

Deorro singles chronology
"Flashlight" (2014)	"Five Hours" (2014)	"Rambo" (2014)

Music video
- "Five Hours" on YouTube

"Five Hours" is a 2014 single by Mexican-American DJ Deorro. The song charted in a number of countries and notably reached number 8 on SNEP official French Singles Chart. In the United States, the single reached number one on Billboard's Dance/Mix Show Airplay chart in its 6 September 2014 issue, giving Deorro his first number-one single and his debuted single in his home country. The American version that was first released featured vocals by DyCy and charted as "Five Hours (Don't Hold Me Back)". Later, a third vocal version entitled "Five More Hours" was released and was successful in the charts.

== Track listing ==
Digital download
No.	Title	Length
1.	"Five Hours"	5:26

== Notable Uses ==
Deorro made a guest appearance as a DJ on the MTV series, Teen Wolf which led to an elevated presence at the network where his works were featured.

The song is also played in the fourth quarter during an extended timeout at Los Angeles Rams home games at SoFi Stadium. When the song is played in the stadium, a large rave and disco setting takes over the venue with electric video features taking place on the Infinity Screen.

== Charts and certifications ==
=== Weekly charts ===
Chart (2014)	Peak position
Austria (Ö3 Austria Top 40)	37
Belgium (Ultratop 50 Flanders)	36
Belgium (Ultratop 50 Wallonia)	7
Czech Republic Singles Digital (ČNS IFPI)	70
France (SNEP)	8
Mexico Anglo (Monitor Latino)	5
Netherlands (Single Top 100)	68
Norway (VG-lista)	17
Poland Airplay (ZPAV)	17
Poland Dance (ZPAV)	1
Slovakia Singles Digital (ČNS IFPI)	74
Sweden (Sverigetopplistan)	45
Switzerland (Schweizer Hitparade)	60
US Hot Dance/Electronic Songs (Billboard)	14

=== Year-end charts ===
Chart (2014)	Position
Belgium (Ultratop Wallonia)	45
France (SNEP)	50
US Hot Dance/Electronic Songs (Billboard)	41

=== Certifications ===
Region	Certification	Certified units/sales
Canada (Music Canada)	3× Platinum	240,000^{‡}
Denmark (IFPI Danmark)	Gold	45,000^{‡}
Italy (FIMI)	Gold	15,000^{‡}
Norway (IFPI Norway)	Gold	5,000^{‡}
United States (RIAA)	Gold	500,000^{‡}
^{*} Sales figures based on certification alone.^{‡} Sales+streaming figures based on certification alone.

== Five More Hours ==
"Five More Hours"

Single by Deorro and Chris Brown

from the album Good Evening
- Released: March 3, 2015
- Genre: Dance-pop; EDM; progressive house; electro house
- Length: 3:31
- Label: Ultra; PRMD
- Songwriters: Erick Orrosquieta; John Ryan; Julian Bunetta; Christopher Brown
- Producer: Deorro

Deorro singles chronology
"Perdóname" (2014)	"Five More Hours" (2015)	"Bailar" (2016)

Chris Brown singles chronology
"Private Show" (2015)	"Five More Hours" (2015)	"You Changed Me" (2015)

Music video
- "Five More Hours" on YouTube

Deorro released a third version of "Five Hours", featuring vocals from American singer Chris Brown titled "Five More Hours". It was released as a digital download in the United States on March 3, 2015.

=== Music video ===
On April 30, 2015, an official music video for the third version was released. It was directed by Andrew Sandler and was filmed in California. The video also features rapper Travis Scott. The video shows Brown and Scott on their way to Coachella to premiere Brown's vocal mix of Deorro's Five Hours. Brown's car breaks down in the desert and he holds a party in a school bus, driven by Deorro, on his way to the concert.

=== Track listing ===
Digital download
No.	Title	Length
1.	"Five More Hours" (with Chris Brown)	3:31

=== Charts and certifications ===
==== Weekly charts ====
Chart (2015)	Peak position
Australia (ARIA)	7
Austria (Ö3 Austria Top 40)	15
Belgium (Ultratop 50 Flanders)	13
Belgium (Ultratop 50 Wallonia)	24
Canada Hot 100 (Billboard)	57
Czech Republic Airplay (ČNS IFPI)	17
Denmark (Tracklisten)	10
Finland (Suomen virallinen lista)	2
France (SNEP)	31
France Airplay (SNEP)	8
Germany (GfK)	23
Hungary (Rádiós Top 40)	4
Hungary (Single Top 40)	18
Hungary (Stream Top 40)	10
Ireland (IRMA)	15
Italy (FIMI)	28
Netherlands (Single Top 100)	34
New Zealand (Recorded Music NZ)	11
Norway (VG-lista)	10
Scottish Singles Sales (Official Charts)	1
South Africa Airplay (EMA)	6
Spain (Promusicae)	1
Sweden (Sverigetopplistan)	7
Switzerland (Schweizer Hitparade)	22
UK Singles (Official Charts)	4
UK Singles Downloads (Official Charts)	1
US Bubbling Under Hot 100 (Billboard)	1
US Hot Dance/Electronic Songs (Billboard)	6
US Rhythmic Airplay (Billboard)	39

2026 weekly chart performance for "Five More Hours"
Chart (2026)	Peak position
Venezuela Airplay (Record Report)	61

==== Year-end charts ====
Chart (2015)	Position
Australia (ARIA)	57
Austria (Ö3 Austria Top 40)	60
Belgium (Ultratop Flanders)	82
France (SNEP)	119
Germany (Official German Charts)	59
Hungary (Rádiós Top 40)	36
Italy (FIMI)	53
Netherlands (Single Top 100)	77
New Zealand (Recorded Music NZ)	39
Spain (PROMUSICAE)	49
Sweden (Sverigetopplistan)	34
Switzerland (Schweizer Hitparade)	74
UK Singles (Official Charts Company)	76
US Hot Dance/Electronic Songs (Billboard)	17

Chart (2016)	Position
Hungary (Rádiós Top 40)	90

==== Certifications ====
Certifications for "Five More Hours"
Region	Certification	Certified units/sales
Australia (ARIA)	4× Platinum	280,000^{‡}
Belgium (BRMA)	Gold	10,000^{‡}
Canada (Music Canada)	3× Platinum	240,000^{‡}
Denmark (IFPI Danmark)	2× Platinum	180,000^{‡}
Germany (BVMI)	Platinum	400,000^{‡}
Italy (FIMI)	2× Platinum	100,000^{‡}
Mexico (AMPROFON)	4× Platinum+Gold	270,000^{‡}
New Zealand (RMNZ)	3× Platinum	90,000^{‡}
Norway (IFPI Norway)	2× Platinum	80,000^{‡}
Poland (ZPAV)	Platinum	20,000^{*}
Spain (Promusicae)	Platinum	40,000^{‡}
Sweden (GLF)	3× Platinum	120,000^{‡}
United Kingdom (BPI)	Platinum	600,000^{‡}
United States (RIAA)	Platinum	1,000,000^{‡}
^{*} Sales figures based on certification alone.^{‡} Sales+streaming figures based on certification alone.

=== Release history ===
Region	Date	Format	Label
United States	March 3, 2015	Digital download	Ultra
Ireland	June 12, 2015	Digital download	Ultra
United Kingdom	June 15, 2015	Digital download	Ultra
