= Perspectiva (album) =

Studio album by Gilberto Santa Rosa
- Released: October 18, 1991
- Genre: Salsa
- Length: 50:50
- Label: Sony Discos
- Producer: Gilberto Santa Rosa

Gilberto Santa Rosa chronology
Punto de Vista (1990)	Perspectiva (1991)	A Dos Tiempos de un Tiempo (1992)

Singles from Perspectiva
- 1. "Conciencia" Released: September 16, 1991; 2. "Amor Mío No Te Vayas" Released: December 9, 1991; 3. "Vino Tinto" Released: February 3, 1992

Professional ratings
Review scores
Source	Rating
Allmusic	4/5 stars

Perspectiva (Perspective) is the sixth studio album recorded by Puerto Rican salsa singer Gilberto Santa Rosa released in October 18, 1991. It was nominated for Tropical/Salsa Album of the Year at the Lo Nuestro Awards of 1993.

== Track listing ==
This information adapted from Allmusic.

No.	Title	Writer(s)	Length
1.	"Conciencia"	Omar Alfanno	5:30
2.	"Algo Especial"	Charlie Donato	4:59
3.	"Cosas Nuevas"	Jose Luis Piloto	5:00
4.	"Se Supone"	Guadalupe García, Angel "Cucco" Pena	5:14
5.	"Bomba de Tiempo"	Angel "Cucco" Pena, Rossy	5:00
6.	"Vino Tinto"	Marisela Verena	4:52
7.	"¿A Quién? ¿A Mi?"	Omar Alfanno	4:48
8.	"Amor Mío No Te Vayas"	Sarah Gonzalez	5:37
9.	"Hasta Que Vuelvas"	Jorge Luis Piloto	5:08
10.	"Sembrando Para Tí"	Tosca Tango Orchestra	4:42

== Chart performance ==
Chart (1991)	Peak position
U.S. Billboard Tropical Albums	1

== Certification ==
Region	Certification	Certified units/sales
United States (RIAA)	2× Platinum (Latin)	200,000^{^}
^{^} Shipments figures based on certification alone.

== See also ==
- List of Billboard Tropical Albums number ones from the 1990s
