= Yee (song) =

Single by Deorro
- Released: 14 October 2013
- Recorded: 2013
- Genre: Melbourne bounce; electro house
- Length: 3:30
- Label: Panda Funk Records; Revealed Recordings
- Songwriter(s): Erick Orrosquiesta
- Producer(s): Deorro

Deorro singles chronology
"Yee" (2013)	"Freak" (2014)

Music video
- "Yee" on YouTube

"Yee" is the debut single by American DJ and producer Deorro. It charted in a number of countries particularly in Europe. The song appeared on several dance compilations in 2013.

== Charts ==
Peak (2013)	Highest position
Austria (Ö3 Austria Top 40)	33
Belgium (Ultratip Bubbling Under Flanders)	68
Belgium (Ultratip Bubbling Under Wallonia)	8
France (SNEP)	74
Germany (GfK)	62
Netherlands (Single Top 100)	37
Switzerland (Schweizer Hitparade)	65
