= A Dos Tiempos de un Tiempo =

Studio album by Gilberto Santa Rosa
- Released: October 16, 1992
- Genre: Salsa
- Label: Sony Discos
- Producer: Angel "Cucco" Peña, Louie Ramirez

Gilberto Santa Rosa chronology
Perspectiva (1991)	A Dos Tiempos de un Tiempo (1992)	Nace Aquí (1993)

Singles from A Dos Tiempos de un Timepo
- 1. "En La Soledad" Released: November 1992

Professional ratings
Review scores
Source	Rating
Allmusic	4.5/5 stars

A Dos Tiempos de un Tiempo (Two Beats of a Single Beat) is the seventh studio album recorded by Puerto Rican salsa singer Gilberto Santa Rosa released on October 16, 1992. It is a tribute album to Tito Rodríguez.

== Track listing ==
This information adapted from Allmusic.

No.	Title	Writer(s)	Length
1.	"Mama Güela"	Tito Rodríguez	3:20
2.	"En la Oscuridad"	Rafael Solano	3:54
3.	"El Que Se Fue"	Tito Rodríguez	4:54
4.	"Mío"	Mandy Rivas, Mike Rivas	4:02
5.	"Baranga"	Justi Barreto	4:15
6.	"Nuestro Balance"	Chico Novarro	4:14
7.	"Qué Será"	Pepe Delgado	4:17
8.	"Buscando la Melodía"	Manny R. Guerra, Julio Blanco Leonard	5:45
9.	"Monólogo"	Chico Novarro	3:40
10.	"Hoy Te Canto"	Angel "Cucco" Peña, Héctor Rossi	4:22
11.	"Tiemblas"	Tite Curet Alonso	4:17
12.	"Cuando, Cuando"	Boone, Tony Reni, Rodríguez, Rodríquez	3:51
13.	"En la Soledad"	Puchi Balseiro	3:40
14.	"Abarriba Cumbiaremos"	Osvaldo Buffartique	4:23

== Chart performance ==
Chart (1992)	Peak position
U.S. Billboard Tropical Albums	2

== Certification ==
Region	Certification	Certified units/sales
United States (RIAA)	Platinum (Latin)	100,000^{^}
^{^} Shipments figures based on certification alone.
