= Los Monsters =

Studio album by Elvis Crespo
- Released: May 1, 2012
- Recorded: 2011–2012
- Genre: Merengue; Latin pop
- Label: Flash Music

Elvis Crespo chronology
Indestructible (2010)	Los Monsters (2012)

Los Monsters is the eighth studio album by Elvis Crespo. It was released on May 1, 2012 and was nominated for Tropical Album of the Year at the Premio Lo Nuestro 2013.

== Track listing ==
1. "Rico Miedo"
2. "Vallenato En Karaoke" (feat. Maffio)
3. "Conmigo y Contigo" (feat. El Cata)
4. "Yo No Soy Un Monstruo" (feat. Ilegales)
5. "Por Un Minuto de Tu Amor" (feat. Joseph Fonseca)
6. "Bajo El Arbol" (feat. Angel & Khriz)
7. "Zombie" (feat. El Cata)
8. "Te Invito Un Café"
9. "La Novia Bella" (feat. Gocho)
10. "Vallenato En Karaoke" (feat. Los del Puente)
11. "Vallenato En Karaoke" (merengue version)
12. "Nuestra Canción" (feat. Jorge Celedón)

== Personnel ==
- Composer - Alejandro Vezzani
- Featured Artist - Angel y Khriz
- Composer - Antonio Gonzalez
- Arreglos - Edward "El Cata" Bello
- Composer - Edward Bello
- Featured Artist - El Cata
- Arreglos, Composer, Coros, Primary Artist - Elvis Crespo
- Guira - Felix Algarin
- Guira, Timbales - Franklin Guerrero
- Mezcla - Gary Bannister
- Mezcla - Gilberto Pena
- Featured Artist - Gocho
- Composer - Homero Rodriguez
- Featured Artist - Ilegales
- Coros - Jerry Medina
- Congas - Jimmy Morales
- Featured Artist - Jorge Celedon
- Featured Artist - Joseph Fonseca
- Mezcla - Juan Tavares
- Piano - Lenny Prieto
- Coros - Lila Flores
- Featured Artist - Los Del Puente
- Arreglos, Piano - Luis Cruz
- Featured Artist - Maffio
- Arreglos - Maffio Alkatraks
- Booking - Maribel Vega
- Coros - Melvin Algarin
- Arreglos, Mezcla, Piano - Norberto Dominguez
- Coros - Osvaldo Roman
- Tambora - Pedro Angulo
- Guira, Requinto, Seguidor - Radames Travieso
- Tambora - Rafael Brito
- Congas - Rafael Concepcion
- Arreglos - Ramon Sanchez
- Arreglos, Mezcla, Piano - Richard Marcell
- Arreglos - Roberto Cora
- Mezcla - Rolando Alejando
- Composer - Rudolfo Barrera
- Featured Artist - Tono Rosario
- Composer - Virginia Pou
- Composer - Vladimir Dotel

== Charts ==
Chart (2012)	Peak position
US Latin Albums (Billboard)	24
US Tropical Albums (Billboard)	3
