= De Cara al Viento =

Studio album by Gilberto Santa Rosa
- Released: November 22, 1994
- Genre: Salsa
- Length: 64:31
- Label: Sony Discos
- Producer: Gilberto Santa Rosa, Ramon Sanchez

Gilberto Santa Rosa chronology
Nace Aquí (1993)	De Cara al Viento (1994)	En Vivo Desde El Carnegie Hall (1995)

Singles from De Cara al Viento
- 1. "Te Propongo" Released: July 1994; 2. "Mal Herido" Released: October 1994; 3. "La Sigo Amando Tanto" Released: February 1995; 4. "Te Amaré" Released: May 1995

Professional ratings
Review scores
Source	Rating
Allmusic	4.5/5 stars

De Cara al Viento (Facing the Wind) is the ninth studio album recorded by Puerto Rican salsa singer Gilberto Santa Rosa released on November 22, 1994.

== Track listing ==
This information adapted from Allmusic.

No.	Title	Writer(s)	Length
1.	"Te Propongo"	Juan Luis Guerra	4:50
2.	"Hasta las Cuantas"	Juan Formell	4:59
3.	"Mal Herido"	Omar Alfanno	4:38
4.	"Maña y Teoría"	Pedro Azael	4:56
5.	"Encuentro"	Lenny Prieto	3:45
6.	"A Propósito"	Mario Diaz	5:39
7.	"Me Quiere Enamorar"	Charlie Donato	4:48
8.	"La Sigo Amando Tanto"	Pedro Azael	4:32
9.	"En la Palma de Mi Mano"	Roberto Anglero	4:42
10.	"Ella"	Ella Fitzgerald, Gerardo Garcia	5:00
11.	"Sueños Son"	Marisela Verena	5:15
12.	"Me Duele Quererte"	Luis Enrique Mejia	6:20
13.	"Te Amaré"	Omar Alfanno, Pierre Cour, Andre Popp	5:07

== Chart performance ==
Chart (1994)	Peak position
U.S. Billboard Top Latin Albums	22
U.S. Billboard Tropical Albums	5

== Certification ==
Region	Certification	Certified units/sales
United States (RIAA)	Platinum (Latin)	100,000^{^}
^{^} Shipments figures based on certification alone.
