= En Vivo Desde El Carnegie Hall =

Live from Carnegie Hall

Live album by Gilberto Santa Rosa
- Released: October 3, 1995
- Recorded: Recorded Live at the Carnegie Hall
- Genre: Salsa
- Length: 80:37
- Label: Sony International

Gilberto Santa Rosa chronology
De Cara al Viento (1994)	Live from Carnegie Hall (1995)	Esencia (1996)

Professional ratings
Review scores
Source	Rating
Allmusic	4/5 stars

En Vivo Desde El Carnegie Hall (english: Live from Carnegie Hall) is a live album by the Puerto Rican Salsa singer Gilberto Santa Rosa, released on October 3, 1995. The Album was recorded live at New York City's Carnegie Hall. This performance marks the first time that a Puerto Rican singer of tropical music to perform at Carnegie Hall. The orchestra was directed by Angel Peña and there was a special appearance by cuatro virtuoso Edwin Colón Zayas.

== Track listing ==
=== Disc One ===
1. "Obertura" – 4:07
2. "Represento" – 3:23
3. "Amor Mio No Te Vayas" – 7:31
4. "Vivir Sin Ella" – 8:32
5. "Quién lo Diría" – 7:38
6. "Sin Voluntad" – 6:20
7. "Cantante de Cartel" – 12:48

=== Disc Two ===
1. "Dime Por Qué" – 5:06
2. "Conciencia" – 6:50
3. "Perdóname" – 8:20
4. "Amanecer Borincano" – 7:16
5. "Plenas (Medley)" – 4:42

== Chart position ==
Year	Chart	Album	Peak
1995	Billboard Tropical/Salsa	En Vivo Desde El Carnegie Hall	2
1995	Billboard Top Latin Albums	En Vivo Desde El Carnegie Hall	8

== Sales and certifications ==
Region	Certification	Certified units/sales
United States (RIAA)	2× Platinum (Latin)	200,000^{^}
^{^} Shipments figures based on certification alone.
