= Punto de Vista (album) =

Studio album by Gilberto Santa Rosa
- Released: August 10, 1990
- Genre: Salsa
- Length: 41:46
- Label: Sony Discos
- Producer: Gilberto Santa Rosa

Gilberto Santa Rosa chronology
Salsa en Movimiento (1989)	Punto de Vista (1990)	Perspectiva (1991)

Singles from Punto de Vista
- 1. "Vivir Sin Ella" Released: September 1990; 2. "Perdoname" Released: December 1990; 3. "De Cualquier Manera" Released: February 1991; 4. "Impaciencia" Released: April 1991

Professional ratings
Review scores
Source	Rating
Allmusic	4/5 stars

Punto de Vista (Point of View) is the fifth studio album recorded by Puerto Rican salsa singer Gilberto Santa Rosa released on August 10, 1990. It was nominated for Tropical/Salsa Album of the Year at the 1991 Lo Nuestro Awards.

== Track listing ==
This information adapted from Allmusic.

No.	Title	Writer(s)	Length
1.	"Vivir Sin Ella"	Omar Alfanno	5:00
2.	"No Hay Nada Mejor"	Charlie Donato	5:09
3.	"Perdóname"	Jose Luis Piloto	5:11
4.	"Me Liberé"	Johnny Ortiz	4:26
5.	"De Cualquier Manera"	Frank Quintero	4:28
6.	"Impaciencia (We're Not Alone)"	Luis Gómez-Escolar, Boz Scaggs	4:32
7.	"Aunque Tú No Quieras"	Johnny Ortiz	4:14
8.	"Me Acuerdo de Ti"	Mario Diaz	3:46
9.	"No Me Dejes Solo"	Jorge Luis Piloto	5:00

== Chart performance ==
Chart (1990)	Peak position
U.S. Billboard Tropical Albums	2

== Certification ==
Region	Certification	Certified units/sales
United States (RIAA)	Platinum (Latin)	100,000^{^}
^{^} Shipments figures based on certification alone.
