= The Remixes (Elvis Crespo album) =

Remix album by Elvis Crespo
- Released: December 14, 1999
- Genre: Merengue
- Label: Sony Discos

Elvis Crespo chronology
Píntame (1999)	The Remixes (1999)	Wow Flash! (2000)

The Remixes is a remix album by Elvis Crespo, released in 1999 through Sony Discos.

== Track listing ==
1. "Suavemente" (Hot Head Mix)
2. "Tu Sonrisa" (Eddie 'Love' Arroyo-Remix)
3. "Tiemblo" (A.T. Molina Remix)
4. "Come Baby Come" (with Gisselle D'Cole)
5. "Suavemente" (Cibola Extended)
6. "Tu Sonrisa" (Club Off The Wall Mix)
7. "Tiemblo" (A Que No Te Atreves-Mix)
8. "Come Baby Come" (Club Remix)
9. "Suave" (Megamix)

== Charts ==
Chart (2000)	Peak position
US Billboard 200	155
US Latin Albums (Billboard)	2
US Tropical Albums (Billboard)	12

== Sales and certifications ==
Region	Certification	Certified units/sales
United States (RIAA)	Platinum (Latin)	100,000^{^}
^{^} Shipments figures based on certification alone.
