= La Noche (Joe Arroyo song) =

Song by Joe Arroyo

from the album Fuego en Mi Mente
- Released: 1988
- Genre: Salsa
- Label: Discos Fuentes; Sono Latin Records
- Songwriter: Joe Arroyo

"La Noche" (translation "the night") is a salsa song written and performed by the Colombian singer Joe Arroyo. Billboard called it a "groundbreaking song" that made Arroyo "a groundbreaking force in Colombian salsa."

It was selected by Hip Latina in 2017 as one of the "13 Old School Songs Every Colombian Grew Up Listening To"; the publication wrote that the song was "most likely part of any Colombian's perpetual playlist." Viva Music Colombia rated the song No. 50 on its list of the 100 most important Colombian songs of all time. Arroyo's original version peaked at number eight in Panama.

The song was covered in merengue by Puerto Rican singer Elvis Crespo on his third studio Wow Flash! (2000). Crespo's version peaked at number 34 on the Billboard Hot Latin Songs and number 8 on the Tropical Airplay chart in the United States. Crespo's version was awarded on the tropical/salsa field at the 2002 ASCAP Latin Awards.

Colombian rock singer Juanes also covered it on his second studio album Un Día Normal which features Arroyo's vocals from the original recording. Puerto Rican reggaeton artist Don Omar sampled "La Noche" on his 2003 song "Dile".

== Charts ==
=== Weekly charts ===
==== Joe Arroyo version ====
Chart (1989)	Peak position
Panama (UPI)	8

==== Elvis Crespo version ====
Chart (2001)	Peak position
US Hot Latin Songs (Billboard)	34
