= Deorro =

American DJ (born 1991)

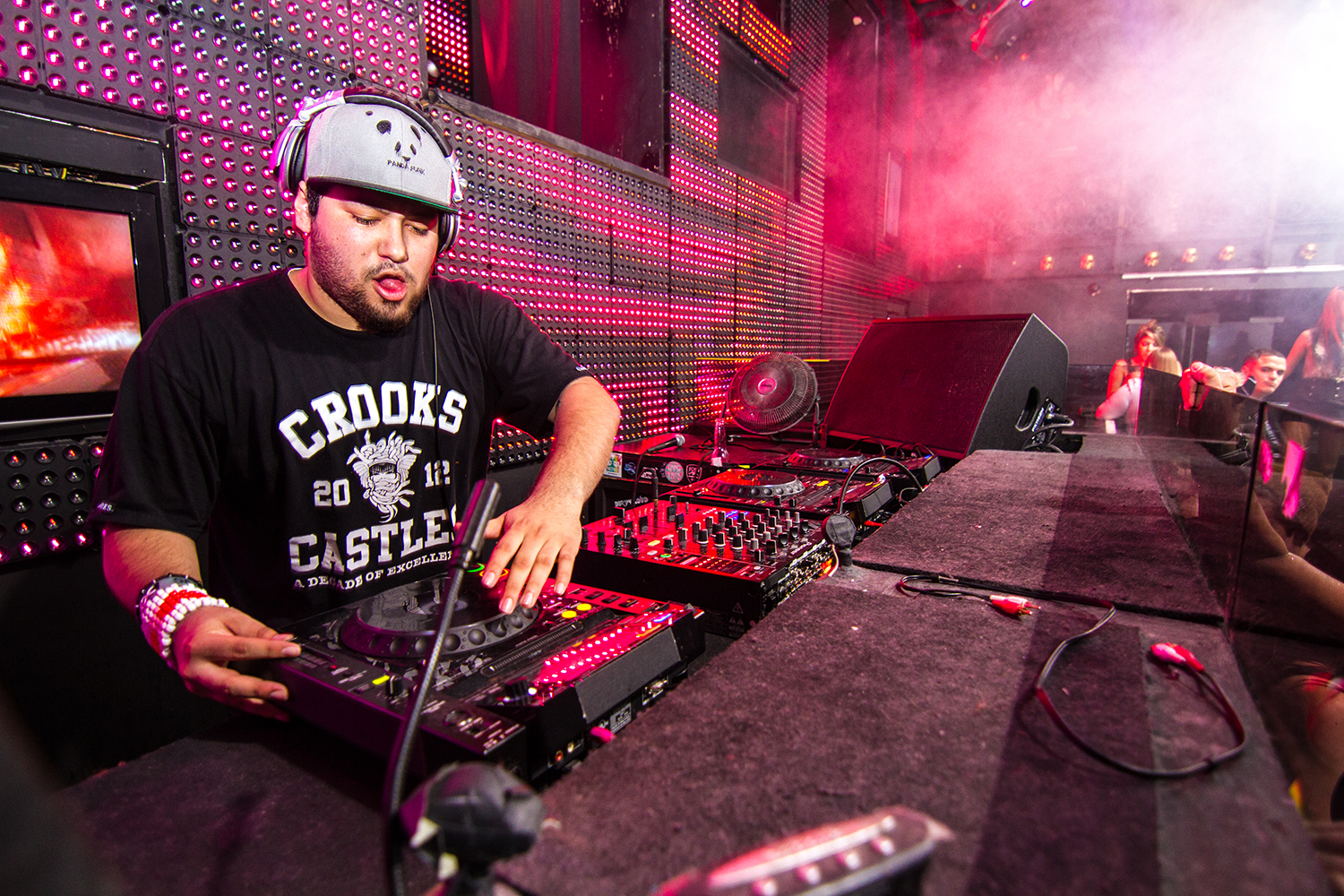
- Deorro in 2013

Background information
- Also known as: TON!C
- Born: Erick Orrosquieta; August 30, 1991 (age 35); Los Angeles, California, U.S.
- Origin: West Covina, California, U.S.
- Genres: Dutch house; progressive house; electro house; Melbourne bounce; EDM; trap; jumpstyle; moombahton
- Occupations: DJ; Record producer
- Instruments: Keyboards; Turntables; Ableton Live
- Years active: 2005–present
- Labels: Dim Mak; Revealed; Ultra; PandaFunk; Monstercat; Spinnin'
- Website: deorro.com

Erick Orrosquieta (born August 30, 1991), commonly known by his stage name Deorro, is a Mexican and American DJ and record producer signed to Ultra Records. He formerly used the name TON!C.

== Career ==
=== 2005–2012: Early beginnings ===
Deorro was born in Los Angeles to Mexican parents. He began his DJ career by playing at local gigs when he was 14. By the time Deorro turned 17, he was already producing his own tracks. In 2012, he was asked by DJ Chuckie to remix his track "Make Some Noise". Deorro's remix landed in the top 50 on Beatport. He has since remixed tracks from multiple international famed DJs such as Steve Aoki, Laidback Luke, and Gareth Emery, among others.

=== 2013–present: Breakthrough ===
In 2013, he released the track "Yee" on Hardwell's label, Revealed Recordings, which charted in Austria, Belgium, France, Germany, Netherlands, and Switzerland. On 18 March 2014 he released the single "Freak" with Steve Aoki and Diplo. On 24 March 2014 he released the single "Flashlight" with R3hab. He released the single "Five Hours" in February 2014. The track charted in Austria, Belgium, France, the Netherlands, Norway, Sweden, and Switzerland. On 17 May 2014, Deorro announced on his Twitter page he was going to take a break from DJing in order to have more focus on making music and expanding his record label, Panda Funk. He guest-starred on the MTV series Teen Wolf as the DJ. In August 2014 he released the single "Rambo" with J-Trick. On 18 October 2014, Deorro received the award for highest new entry on the 'DJmag top 100 DJs 2014' contest, he hit spot 19. He also played a half-hour set at the 'DJmag top 100 DJs' event, which took place during ADE in Amsterdam, the Netherlands. In December 2014, he released the single "Perdoname", which achieved success in Poland after its appearance in Microsoft Windows TV commercial. In March 2015, he released a third version of "Five Hours" with Chris Brown, titled "Five More Hours". The song has charted in Ireland, the Netherlands, and Sweden. On 31 March 2017, Deorro released his debut album, Good Evening, which features 26 tracks, including his new single "Rise and Shine". On February 24, 2022, Deorro performed with Pitbull and IAMCHINO on the live-debut of their late-2021 single, "Discoteca", at the 2022 Premio Lo Nuestro awards.

== Discography ==
=== Studio albums ===
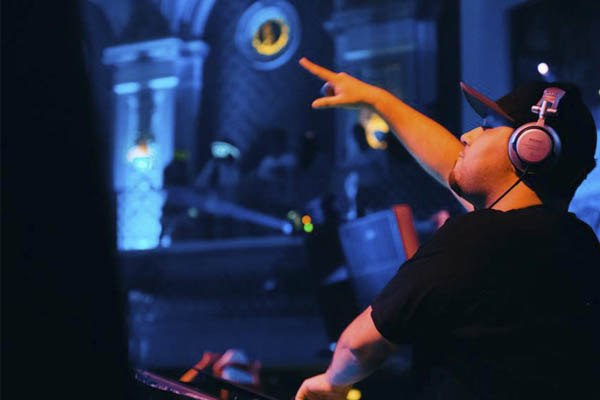
Deorro performing in June 2013

List of EPs, with selected details
Title	Details
Good Evening	Released: March 31, 2017; Label: Ultra; Format: Digital download
ORRO	Released: July 1, 2022; Label: Ultra; Format: Digital download

=== Singles ===
==== As lead artist ====
List of singles as lead artist, with selected chart positions and certifications, showing year released and album name
Title	Year	Peak chart positions										Certifications	Album
Title	Year	US Top 40	BEL	FRA	GER	NLD	NOR	POL	SWE	SWI	UK	Certifications	Album
"Yee"	2013	—	58	74	62	37	—	—	—	65	—		Non-album singles
"Freak" (with Steve Aoki and Diplo featuring Steve Bays)	2014	—	118	—	—	—	—	—	—	—	—		Non-album singles
"Flashlight" (with R3hab)	2014	—	104	—	—	—	—	—	—	—	—		Non-album singles
"Five Hours"	2014	—	7	8	—	68	17	17	45	60	—	RIAA: Gold; IFPI NOR: Gold; MC: 3× Platinum	Non-album singles
"Rambo" (with J-Trick)	2014	—	—	199	—	—	—	—	—	—	—		Non-album singles
"Perdóname" (with DyCy and Adrian Delgado)	2014	—	—	—	—	—	—	1	—	—	—	RIAA: 2× Platinum (Latin)	Non-album singles
"Five More Hours" (with Chris Brown)	2015	—	13	31	23	34	10	—	7	22	4	RIAA: Platinum; BEA: Gold; BPI: Platinum; BVMI: Platinum; GLF: 3× Platinum; IFPI NOR: 2× Platinum; MC: 3× Platinum; ZPAV: Platinum	Good Evening
"Bailar" (featuring Elvis Crespo)	2016	37	14	7	43	3	—	53	75	48	—	RIAA: Gold; BEA: Gold; BVMI: Gold; IFPI SWI: Gold; MC: Gold; NVPI: 3× Platinum; SNEP: Diamond; ZPAV: Gold	Good Evening
"Goin Up" (with DyCy)	2016	—	3	—	—	—	—	—	—	—	—		Good Evening
"Tell Me Lies" (featuring Lesley Roy)	2017	—	—	—	—	—	—	—	—	—	—		Good Evening
"Rise and Shine"	2017	—	—	—	—	—	—	—	—	—	—		Good Evening
"Feeling Pretty Good"	2017	—	—	—	—	—	—	—	—	—	—		Good Evening
"Burn Out"	2017	—	—	—	—	—	—	—	—	—	—		Non-album singles
"Andele"	2017	—	—	—	—	—	—	—	—	—	—		Non-album singles
"Existence"	2018	—	—	—	—	—	—	—	—	—	—		Non-album singles
"Offspring"	2018	—	—	—	—	—	—	—	—	—	—		Non-album singles
"Shakalaka" (with Steve Aoki, Makj and Max Styler)	2018	—	—	—	—	—	—	—	—	—	—		Non-album singles
"Dracarys" (with Dirty Audio)	2018	—	—	—	—	—	—	—	—	—	—		Non-album singles
"Knockout" (with Makj and Quintino)	2018	—	—	—	—	—	—	—	—	—	—		Non-album singles
"Titan" (with D3FAI)	2018	—	—	—	—	—	—	—	—	—	—		Non-album singles
"Dftf" (with Vikström)	2018	—	—	—	—	—	—	—	—	—	—		Non-album singles
"Focus" (featuring Lena Leon)	2018	—	—	—	—	—	—	—	—	—	—		Non-album singles
"Muñequita Linda" (with Juan Magán and MAKJ, featuring YFN Lucci)	2018	—	—	—	—	—	—	—	—	—	—	RIAA: Gold (Latin)	Non-album singles
"Wild Like the Wind"	2019	—	—	—	—	—	—	—	—	—	—		Non-album singles
"Pica" (with Elvis Crespo and Henry Fong)	2019	—	—	—	—	—	—	—	—	—	—		Non-album singles
"Keep It Goin'" (with Danny Ávila)	2019	—	—	—	—	—	—	—	—	—	—		Non-album singles
"Obvious"	2019	—	—	—	—	—	—	—	—	—	—		Non-album singles
"All This Time"	2019	—	—	—	—	—	—	—	—	—	—		Non-album singles
"Shake That Bottle" (with Hektor Mass)	2019	—	—	—	—	—	—	—	—	—	—		Non-album singles
"Retumba" (with Makj)	2019	—	—	—	—	—	—	—	—	—	—		Non-album singles
"Left Right" (with Hardwell and Makj featuring Fatman Scoop)	2019	—	—	—	—	—	—	—	—	—	—		Non-album singles
"I Like This F'n Song" (with Krunk!)	2020	—	—	—	—	—	—	—	—	—	—		Non-album singles
"Amanecer"	2020	—	—	—	—	—	—	—	—	—	—		Non-album singles
"Cuando" (with Los Dutis)	2020	—	—	—	—	—	—	—	—	—	—		Non-album singles
"Beso"	2020	—	—	—	—	—	—	—	—	—	—		Non-album singles
"Me Siento Bien" (with Kura featuring Alex Rose)	2021	—	—	—	—	—	—	—	—	—	—		ORRO
"Si Tú No Estás Aquí" (featuring LUA)	2021	—	—	—	—	—	—	—	—	—	—		ORRO
"Ponte Pa' Mi" (featuring Jon Z)	2021	—	—	—	—	—	—	—	—	—	—		ORRO
"Napoleona" (with Elvis Crespo and IAmChino)	2021	—	—	—	—	—	—	—	—	—	—		ORRO
"Rumba" (featuring Jeon)	2021	—	—	—	—	—	—	—	—	—	—		ORRO
"Adios" (with Andrez Babii)	2021	—	—	—	—	—	—	—	—	—	—		Non-album single
"Se Vuelve Loca" (with Gente De Zona)	2021	—	—	—	—	—	—	—	—	—	—		ORRO
"Savage" (with Tiësto)	2022	—	—	—	—	—	—	—	—	—	—		Together Again
"Yo Las Pongo" (with Los Tucanes de Tijuana and Maffio)	2022	—	—	—	—	—	—	—	—	—	—		ORRO
"—" denotes a recording that did not chart or was not released in that territory.

=== Remixes ===
- 2013: Laidback Luke — Pogo (feat. Majestic) [Deorro Remix]
- 2019: Timmy Trumpet — "World at our Feet" (Deorro Remix)
- 2020: Armin van Buuren featuring Sam Martin — "Wild Wild Son" (Deorro and Reece Low Remix)
- 2020: Steve Aoki featuring Agnez Mo and Desiigner — "Girl" (Deorro and Dave Mak Remix)
- 2022: IAmChino x Pitbull — "Discoteca" (Deorro Remix)
- 2023: Marshmello & Farruko - "Esta Vida" (Deorro Remix)

== Awards and nominations ==
Year	Award	Category	Recipient(s)	Result	Ref.
2016	NRJ Music Awards	Best International DJ	Deorro	Nominated	
2016	NRJ Music Awards	Best Single Dance/Electro	"Bailar"	Nominated	
2017	WDM Radio Awards	Best Dancefloor Track	"Bailar"	Nominated	

=== DJ Magazine top 100 DJs ===
Year	Position	Notes	Ref.
2014	19	New Entry	
2015	28	Down 9	
2016	53	Down 25	
2018	89	Re-Entry	
2019	65	Up 24	
2023	76	Re-Entry	
