= Gilberto Santa Rosa =

Puerto Rican musician (born 1962)

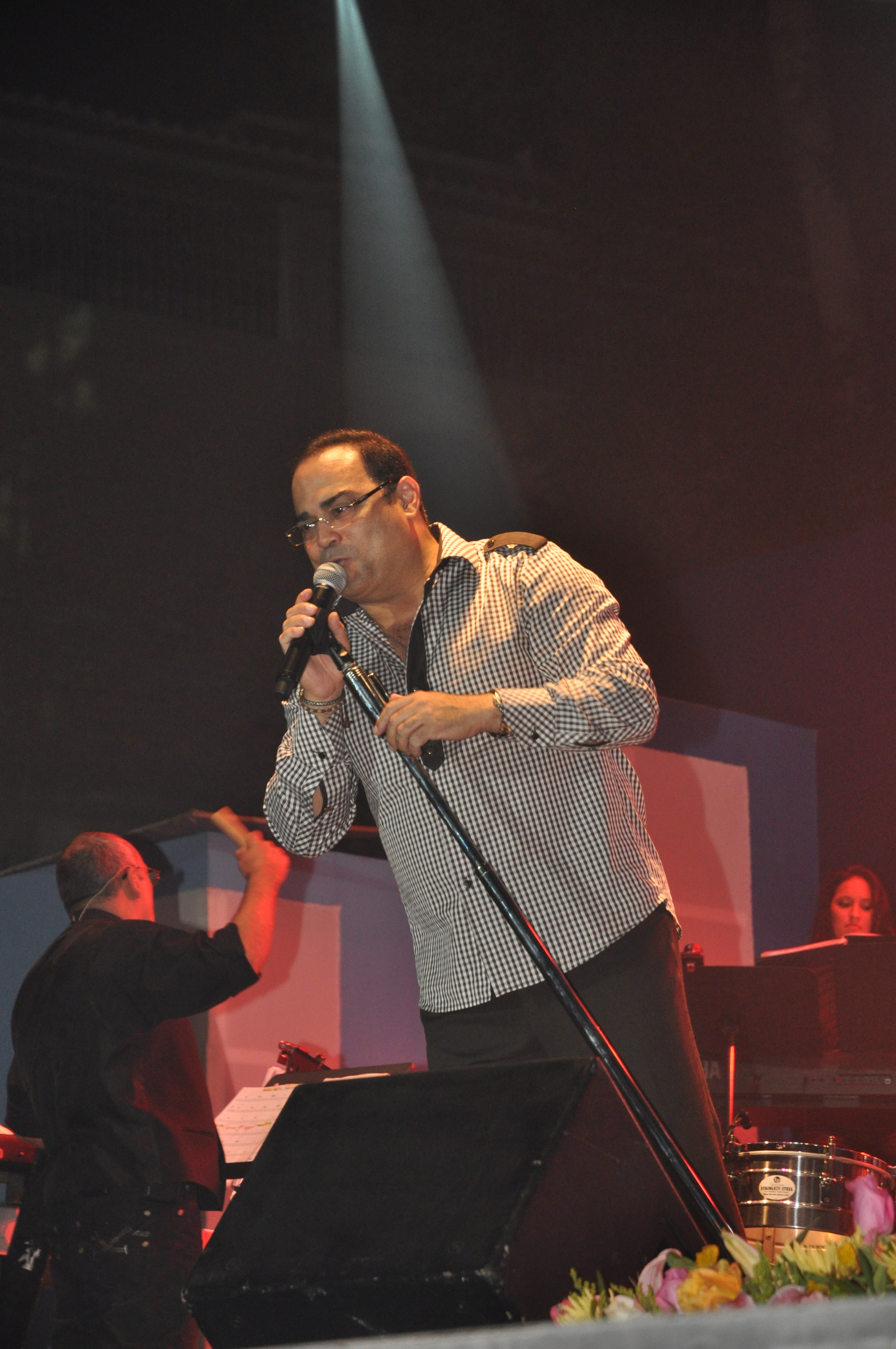
- Santa Rosa in 2011

Background information
- Also known as: El Caballero de la Salsa ("The Gentleman of Salsa")
- Born: August 21, 1962 (age 64); Santurce, San Juan, Puerto Rico
- Genres: Salsa; bolero
- Occupations: Bandleader; singer; actor
- Years active: 1976–present
- Label: Independent

Gilberto Santa Rosa Cortés (pronounced [xilˈβeɾto santa ɾosa]), nicknamed "El Caballero de la Salsa" (The Gentleman of Salsa) (born August 21, 1962), is a Puerto Rican bandleader and singer of salsa and bolero. He is a six-time Grammy Award winner and has sold over three million records in the United States and Puerto Rico. Santa Rosa also starred in a comedy.

== Early years ==
Santa Rosa was born in Santurce, Puerto Rico. Here he received his primary and secondary education and became interested in music. He took part in his first concert while a teenager and in 1976, he made his recording debut as a backup singer with the Mario Ortiz Orchestra; soon afterwards he was recruited by La Grande Orchestra, where he became the lead singer. He remained with the orchestra for two years, during which time he met Elias Lopez who helped to mold and polish him as a singer.

== Singing career ==
During the 1980s, he recorded Homenaje a Eddie Palmieri (Tribute to Eddie Palmieri)) with the Puerto Rican All Stars. He also recorded with various orchestras, amongst them the Tommy Olivencia Orchestra, and the Willie Rosario orchestra. Santa Rosa developed a unique style of "soneo" (improvisation) in salsa that permitted him to be successful in both the "tropical" and "romantic" styles of the music.

In 1986, Santa Rosa formed his own band and signed with Combo Records; a string of hits followed, such as "Good Vibrations", "De amor y salsa" (Of Love and Salsa), "Punto de vista" (Point of View), "Vivir sin ella" (Living without Her) and "Perspectiva".

Santa Rosa was also the first singer of tropical salsa to carry out a concert at the Carnegie Hall Theater, in New York City, where he performed as the opening number, his unique version of the salsa tune, "Represento" (I Represent), composed by Lou Briel. This event was recorded live at the hall, and later released as an album. A highlight of the night was the four-minute unscripted addition he made to his song "Perdoname" (Forgive Me), which solidified his improvisational talent. This live version became such a sensation thereafter that Santa Rosa had to memorize his own improvised lines for future concerts, and Perdoname became the closing song to his shows.

In 1990, Santa Rosa joined the all-star "La Puertorriqueña" project which included Andy Montañez; in the same year he was awarded the Billboard Lo Nuestro Award for Best Male Singer. He also participated in the play La pareja dispareja (The Odd Couple) alongside Luis Vigoreaux and Rafo Muñiz. In 1995, Santa Rosa traveled to Japan as Puerto Rico's Good Will Ambassador, where he sang "De cara al viento" (Facing the Wind) in Spanish for Japanese audience and the record label company translated all the songs in Japanese. In 1996, the greatest hits album Caballero de la Salsa, Vol 2 was released and he also participated in the First "Festival Presidente" in the Dominican Republic (a Latin music festival sponsored by local Presidente beer). In 1997, he sang with Andy Montañez in New York Citys Lincoln Center and later that year, with Olga Tañón at the Universal Studios Amphitheater in Hollywood, California.

== 2000s-present ==
Santa Rosa's hits continued with the album Expresión, which included the single "Fulana" (What's her name) and in 2001 with the album Romántico. He released Viceversa in 2002, which became a "hit" in the Latin community in the United States and in all of Latin-America.

Santa Rosa has taken on himself the task of keeping Tito Rodríguez's musical legacy alive and has acquired much of Tito's memorabilia, including articles of clothing, music and furniture from his home in Puerto Rico. Santa Rosa has staged several concerts and dances honoring the late singer, and recorded an album of his where with the use of modern technology, he sings "En la soledad" (In Solitude), composed by Puchi Balseiro in a duet with him. During the week of February 24, 2003, Santa Rosa organized a two-night concert at the Center of the Performing Arts in Caguas, Puerto Rico. As an introduction to the event, he arranged for his private collection of Tito Rodríguez memorabilia to be exhibited in the lobby of the center. In 2004, he released "Auténtico".

In addition, he has long played an important role in the career of his friend and protégé, Víctor Manuelle, who Santa Rosa discovered. The two released a joint live album late in 2005, Dos soneros, una historia. In 2006, he released Directo al corazón, and in 2007 he carried out a concert acknowledged by the critics, in Plaza Colón at Santo Domingo and released Contraste with Conteo regresivo being a major album hit. Furthermore, he performs alongside Chucho Avellanet, a musical comedy club-act called, Cantando y Contando, (Singing & Telling Stories), throughout the island.

On February 9, 2008, Santa Rosa participated in an event named "Concierto del amor" which was organized in the Madison Square Garden. In June 2008, "Contraste" received Gold and Platinum certification from the Recording Industry Association of America. According to the organization, the production has sold over 1,500,000 copies. At the moment of certification, the album's first single "Conteo regresivo" had been sixteen weeks in the first place among Billboard's tropical list. Meanwhile, "No te vayas" began gaining positions in the same list. After participating in New York City's Puerto Rican Day Parade, Santa Rosa prepared to begin an international tour beginning on June 13, 2008, in New Orleans before proceeding to Tampa, Florida, Ecuador, Chile, Spain, Colombia and Mexico.

The concert in Chile, on June 28, 2008, was Santa Rosa's first ever in said country. the event took place in the Caupolicán Theatre and was attended by approximately 8,000 fans. On July 5, 2008, Santa Rosa became the first salsa singer to perform at the Palau de la Música in Barcelona. The event was a Sold Out, filling the venue with an attendance of 2,000. Santa Rosa was selected to perform at the "Balón de Oro" award ceremony, the most important honor in Mexican football. Santa Rosa was selected to take part in "La Nueva Salsa", where he would perform along several young salsa artists. Santa Rosa has also contributed to improving Puerto Rico's public education system. He participated in Sapientis Week, an initiative sponsored by the non-profit Sapientis which brings distinguished public figures into classrooms in order to raise the public's awareness of the education crisis in Puerto Rico. On July 17, 2010, he participated in the opening ceremony of the 2010 Central American and Caribbean Games.

In 2017, Santa Rosa had the opportunity to contribute to Lin-Manuel Miranda's single "Almost Like Praying". The song featured various Latin artists and all proceeds benefit the Hispanic Federation's Hurricane Relief Fund, helping those affected by the hurricane that hit Puerto Rico.

In November 8, 2019, Gilberto Santa Rosa was the featured singer on Norberto Vélez's YouTube channel titled "Sesiones Desde La Loma Ep. 2".

In July 25, 2025, Gilberto Santa Rosa performed alongside Bad Bunny for his No Me Quiero Ir de Aquí concert residency, performing "Baile Inolvidable" and "La Agarro Bajando".

== Film ==
In 2012, Santa Rosa plays the father in a comedy, La nena se casa... en Navidad (My little girl is getting married... on Christmas), about a father (and family's) mishaps in the midst of his daughters wedding event.

== Awards and recognition ==
In 2002, Gilberto Santa Rosa was presented with the ASCAP Latin Heritage Award. In the same year, he was presented with a special award at the 2002 Lo Nuestro Awards. On September 28, 2008, Santa Rosa was honored by Union City, New Jersey with the key to the city and a star on the Walk of Fame at Union City's Celia Cruz Park. Santa Rosa presented with the Latin Grammy Lifetime Achievement Award in 2021. As of 2010, he holds the record for the most number-one albums on the Billboard Tropical Albums chart.

== Personal life ==
Gilberto Santa Rosa is married to Alexandra Malagón. On June 6, 2013, Santa Rosa was granted citizenship of the Dominican Republic.

== Discography ==
External audio
- You may listen to Gilberto Santa Rosa's "La Agarro Bajando" here.

- 1986 - Good Vibrations
- 1987 - Keeping Cool!
- 1988 - De amor y salsa
- 1989 - Salsa en... movimiento
- 1990 - Punto de vista
- 1991 - Perspectiva
- 1992 - A dos tiempos de un tiempo
- 1993 - Nace aquí
- 1994 - De cara al viento
- 1995 - En vivo desde el Carnegie Hall
- 1996 - Esencia
- 1997 - De corazón
- 1998 - Salsa Sinfónica en Venezuela
- 1999 - Expresión
- 2000 - Romántico
- 2001 - Intenso
- 2002 - Viceversa
- 2003 - Sólo bolero
- 2004 - Auténtico
- 2006 - Directo al corazón
- 2007 - Contraste
- 2008 - Una Navidad con Gilberto
- 2010 - Irrepetible
- 2012 - Gilberto Santa Rosa
- 2014 - Necesito un bolero
- 2018 - En buena compañía
- 2019 - 40... Y Contando (En Vivo desde Puerto Rico)
- 2020 - Colegas
- 2022 - Debut y Segunda Tanda

== Billboard Hot Latin Songs ==
https://www.billboard.com/artist/gilberto-santa-rosa/chart-history/htl/

- Qué Alguien Me Diga (#1)
- Pueden Decir (#3)
- Déjate Querer (#4)
- La Agarro Bajando (#4)
- Por Más Que Intento (#5)
- Si Te Dijeron (#5)
- Pero No Me Ama (#7)
- Conteo Regresivo (#7)
- Esa Parte de Mí (Perdona) (#8)
- No Quiero Na' Regala'o (#10)
- Perdóname (#11)
- Tú (#13)
- Vivir Sin Ella (#13)
- Conciencia (#14)
- Yo No Te Pido (#14)
- Que Se Lo Lleve el Río (#14)
- Tengo Una Muñeca (#15)
- Sin Voluntad (#15)
- Impaciencia (#18)
- Un Monton de Estrellas (#18)
- Para Decir Te Amo (#19)
- En la Soledad (#19)
- Búscame (#19)
- Sombra Loca (#19)
- Sin Un Amor (#22)
- Un Amor Para la Historia (#24)
- De Cualquier Manera (#25)
- Déjame Sentirle (#27)
- Me Volvieron a Hablar de Ella (#27)
- Peligro (#27)
- ¿Estás Ahí? (#27)
- No Te Vayas (#28)
- Toda la Noche Oliendo a Ti (#31)
- Esas Lágrimas (#32)
- Vino Tinto (#33)
- Te Propongo (#36)
- Enseñame a Vivir Sin Ti (#37)
- Un Poco Más (#38)
- Me Gustan las Navidades (#39)
- Cantante de Cartel (#40)
- Sueños Son (#40)
- No Me la Llame Más (#41)
- Llego el Amor (#41)
- La Fiesta No Es Para Feos (#42)
- Mañana al Mediodía (#43)
- Vivir Sin Ti (#50)

== See also ==
- List of Puerto Ricans
