= Indestructible (Elvis Crespo album) =

Studio album by Elvis Crespo
- Released: December 14, 2010
- Recorded: 2010
- Genre: Merengue; Latin pop
- Label: NuLife Entertainment

Elvis Crespo chronology
Regresó el Jefe (2007)	Indestructible (2010)	Los Monsters (2012)

Indestructible is the seventh studio album by Elvis Crespo. It was released on December 14, 2010.

== Track listing ==
1. "Indestructible" (introduction)
2. "Romántico"
3. "15 Inviernos" (featuring Zone D'Tambora)
4. "Dulce, Salada"
5. "Tu Paño"
6. "Hey Dude!"
7. "Un Día Fuiste Una Flor" (featuring Bachata Heightz)
8. "Solita"
9. "Algo Heavy"
10. "La Novia Bella"
11. "Mi Problema" (featuring Omega & Julio Voltio)

== Charts ==
Chart (2011)	Peak position
US Latin Albums (Billboard)	8
US Tropical Albums (Billboard)	3
