= Saboréalo =

Studio album by Elvis Crespo
- Released: September 28, 2004
- Genre: Merengue
- Label: Ole Music

Elvis Crespo chronology
Urbano (2002)	Saboréalo (2004)	Regresó el Jefe (2007)

Singles from Saboréalo
- 1. "7 Días" Released: 2004; 2. "Hora Enamorada" Released: 2005; 3. "Pan Comio" Released: 2006

Professional ratings
Review scores
Source	Rating
Allmusic	3/5 stars

Saboréalo (Taste It) is the fifth album by Elvis Crespo. It was re-released the following year as Hora Enamorada. This album won Best Merengue Album at the 6th Annual Latin Grammy Awards.

== Track listing ==
1. "Hora Enamorada"
2. "7 Días"
3. "Dónde Estarás"
4. "Veranéame"
5. "Gózame"
6. "Pégate"
7. "Toca"
8. "No Sé Qué Pasó"
9. "Soleo"
10. "Como Yo"
11. "Regálame"
12. "Pan Comio'"
13. "Outro"

=== Special Edition / Hora Enamorada ===
1. "Hora Enamorada"
2. "7 Días"
3. "Dónde Estarás"
4. "Veranéame"
5. "Gózame"
6. "Pégate"
7. "Toca"
8. "No Sé Qué Pasó"
9. "Soleo"
10. "Como Yo"
11. "Regálame"
12. "Pan Comio"
13. "Viva la Navidad"
14. "Una Copa"
15. "El Lamento del Libertario"
16. "Hora Enamorada [Club Mix]"
17. "Hora Enamorada [Reggaeton Mix]"
18. "Outro"

=== 2017 Version ===
1. "Hora Enamorada"
2. "7 Días"
3. "Dónde Estarás"
4. "Veranéame"
5. "Pégate"
6. "Toca"
7. "No Sé Qué Pasó"
8. "Soleo"
9. "Como Yo"
10. "Regálame"
11. "Pan Comio'"
12. "Mambo Guayaquil"

== Charts ==
Chart (2004)	Peak position
US Billboard 200	171
US Latin Albums (Billboard)	3
US Tropical Albums (Billboard)	1

== See also ==
- List of number-one Billboard Tropical Albums from the 2000s
