= Urbano (album) =

Studio album by Elvis Crespo
- Released: May 21, 2002
- Genre: Merengue
- Label: Sony Discos

Elvis Crespo chronology
Wow Flash! (2000)	Urbano (2002)	Saboréalo (2004)

Singles from Urbano
- 1. "Bandida" Released: April 15, 2002; 2. "Besame en la Boca" Released: September 16, 2002; 3. "La Cerveza" Released: January 20, 2003

Professional ratings
Review scores
Source	Rating
Allmusic	4/5 stars

Urbano (Urban) is the fourth studio album by Elvis Crespo.

== Track listing ==
1. "La Cerveza"
2. "A Medias"
3. "Bandida"
4. "Báilalo"
5. "Bésame En La Boca"
6. "Ojos Negros"
7. "Que Se Repita"
8. "Para Mí"
9. "Oh La La"
10. "Amarte Así"
11. "Poco A Poco"
12. "Como Fingir" (Unplugged)
13. "Te Lo Digo Yo"
14. "Señora Tambora" (A Dúo Con Sergio Vargas)

== Personnel ==
- Guitar - Albert King
- Mixing, Recording - Chris Domingo
- Saxophone - Crispin Fernández
- Clothing/Wardrobe - Ed Coriano
- Piano - Eddie Almodovar
- Bajo Sexto - Elias Soriano
- Bajo Sexto - Eliezer González
- Composer, Executive Producer, Primary Artist - Elvis Crespo
- Composer - Erika Ender
- Photography - Eugenio Luis
- Keyboard Programming - Fernando Muscolo
- Arranger, Piano, Programming, Recording, Recording Technician - Freddy Méndez
- Assistant - Gabriel Peña
- Coros - Henry Garcia
- Congas, Percussion - Héctor (Calie) Herrera
- Engineer, Mexcla - Héctor Iván Rosa
- Guitar - Ito Serrano
- Composer - Jacob Barbosa
- Trumpet - Jesús Alonso
- Arranger, Bajo Sexto, Producer - Joel Sanchez
- Guitar - Jorge Laboy
- Tamboura - Jose Dario
- Trumpet - Jose Diaz
- Assistant Producer, Mixing, Producer - José Gazmey
- Trumpet - José Luis Mateo
- Arranger, Composer - Luis A. Cruz
- Composer, Trumpet - Luis Aquino
- Photo Assistance - Malu Seda
- Bajo Sexto - Miguel Gonzalez
- Tamboura - Pedro Angulo
- Coros - Rafael Estrella
- Guira - Rafael Yapo
- Arranger, Coros, Piano - Ramón Orlando
- Coros - Reynold Sosa
- Guira - Richard Mercado
- Engineer - Ricky Marty
- Arranger, Engineer, Musical Director, Producer - Roberto Cora
- Guest Artist, Performer, Primary Artist - Sergio Vargas
- Trombone - Toñito Vázquez
- Engineer - Vic Anesini
- Coros - Wilfred Ortiz
- Coros - Yanira Torres

== Charts ==
Chart (2002)	Peak position
US Latin Albums (Billboard)	4
US Tropical Albums (Billboard)	1

== Sales and certifications ==
Region	Certification	Certified units/sales
United States (RIAA)	Platinum (Latin)	100,000^{^}
^{^} Shipments figures based on certification alone.

== See also ==
- List of number-one Billboard Tropical Albums from the 2000s
