= Hoja en Blanco =

Hoja En Blanco

Studio album by Monchy y Alexandra
- Released: 1999
- Genre: Bachata
- Length: 55:17
- Label: J&N Records; JVN Music; Sony Discos

Monchy y Alexandra chronology
Hoja En Blanco (1999)	Unplugged (2000)

Singles from Hoja En Blanco
- 1. "Hoja En Blanco" Released: 1998; 2. "Pasión" Released: 2000

Hoja En Blanco (English: Blank Sheet) is the debut studio album by Dominican bachata duo Monchy & Alexandra. The album contains the hit single, "Hoja En Blanco" which peaked at number 13 on the Billboard Tropical Airplay chart. It was originally written and performed by the Colombian vallenato band, Los Diablitos.

== Track listing ==
No.	Title	Length
1.	"Hoja En Blanco"	5:07
2.	"Pasión"	5:11
3.	"En El Muelle De San Blas"	4:07
4.	"Llorando Penas"	4:33
5.	"No Soy Culpable"	4:46
6.	"De Olvidarla Me Olvidé"	3:21
7.	"No Puedo Vivir Así"	5:31
8.	"El Teléfono"	4:38
9.	"Este Castigo (Me Acabo Tu Traición)"	5:11
10.	"Sé Que Volverá"	4:09
11.	"No Ha Sido Fácil"	4:43
12.	"Volveré"	4:01
Total length:		55:17
