= Bailar (song) =

Single by Deorro featuring Elvis Crespo

from the album Good Evening
- Released: April 22, 2016 (Original); September 2, 2016 (Version featuring Pitbull)
- Studio: Sony Latin
- Genre: Latin house; electro swing
- Length: 2:17 (radio edit); 2:41 (video edit); 2:40 (with Pitbull); 5:12 (original mix)
- Songwriters: Elvis Crespo; Erick Orrosquieta; Robert Fernández
- Producer: Deorro

Deorro singles chronology
"Five More Hours" (2015)	"Bailar" (2016)	"Goin Up" (2016)

"Bailar" (Dance) is a song by Mexican-American DJ Deorro, featuring the vocals of Elvis Crespo. It was released as a single in 2016 and was a hit mainly in Europe. A remix of the song features rapper Pitbull.

== Track listing ==
- Digital download
1. "Bailar" (feat. Pitbull & Elvis Crespo) — 2:40

== Chart performance ==
"Bailar" performed well in Europe, charting in the top 40 of at least five countries there, while also charting in the top 40 of several U.S. Billboard charts, including the Hot Latin Songs chart at No. 8. The song was most successful in both the Netherlands and Spain, peaking at No. 3, while also reaching the number one spot in Israel.

== Charts ==
=== Weekly charts ===
Chart (2016)	Peak position
Austria (Ö3 Austria Top 40)	11
Belgium (Ultratop 50 Flanders)	14
Belgium (Ultratop 50 Wallonia)	21
France (SNEP)	7
Germany (GfK)	43
Israel International Airplay (Media Forest)	1
Netherlands (Dutch Top 40)	3
Netherlands (Single Top 100)	3
Poland (Polish Airplay Top 100)	53
Slovenia (SloTop50)	47
Spain (PROMUSICAE)	3
Sweden (Sverigetopplistan)	75
Switzerland (Schweizer Hitparade)	48
US Hot Dance/Electronic Songs (Billboard)	14
US Hot Latin Songs (Billboard)	8
US Pop Airplay (Billboard)	37
US Rhythmic Airplay (Billboard)	37
Italy (FIMI)	40

=== Year-end charts ===
Chart (2016)	Position
Belgium (Ultratop Flanders)	63
Belgium (Ultratop Wallonia)	93
France (SNEP)	27
Netherlands (Dutch Top 40)	23
Netherlands (Single Top 100)	44
Israel Airplay	26
Spain (PROMUSICAE)	85
US Hot Dance/Electronic Songs (Billboard)	40
US Hot Latin Songs (Billboard)	41

== Certifications ==
Region	Certification	Certified units/sales
Austria (IFPI Austria)	Gold	15,000^{‡}
Belgium (BRMA)	Gold	10,000^{‡}
Canada (Music Canada)	Gold	40,000^{‡}
France (SNEP)	Diamond	233,333^{‡}
Germany (BVMI)	Gold	200,000^{‡}
Italy (FIMI)	2× Platinum	100,000^{‡}
Mexico (AMPROFON)	Platinum+Gold	90,000^{‡}
Netherlands (NVPI)	3× Platinum	120,000^{‡}
Poland (ZPAV)	Gold	25,000^{‡}
Spain (PROMUSICAE)	Platinum	40,000^{‡}
Switzerland (IFPI Switzerland)	Gold	15,000^{‡}
United States (RIAA)	Gold	500,000^{‡}
^{‡} Sales+streaming figures based on certification alone.
