= Hasta El Fin =

Hasta el Fin

Studio album by Monchy y Alexandra
- Released: October 19, 2004
- Genre: Bachata
- Length: 1:00:10
- Label: J&N Records; JVN Music; Sony Discos

Monchy y Alexandra chronology
The Mix (2003)	Hasta el Fin (2004)	Éxitos y Más (2006)

Singles from Hasta el Fin
- 1. "Perdidos" Released: 2004; 2. "Hasta El Fin" Released: 2004; 3. "Tu Sin Mi y Yo Sin Ti" Released: 2005

Professional ratings
Review scores
Source	Rating
Allmusic	link

Hasta el Fin (Until the End) is Monchy & Alexandra's third studio released album under the Sony International Label, which was released on October 19, 2004.

== Track listing ==
No.	Title	Length
1.	"Perdidos" (Versión Bachata)	4:27
2.	"No Me Pidas Más"	4:32
3.	"Hasta El Fin"	4:13
4.	"Esperando Estar Juntos"	3:40
5.	"No Te Prometo Que Sí"	4:45
6.	"Quisiera Olvidarte"	5:00
7.	"Dividido En Dos"	4:06
8.	"Fantasías"	3:43
9.	"Hazme Tu Esposa"	4:07
10.	"Tu Sin Mi y Yo Sin Ti"	3:42
11.	"Arrancarte De Mi Piel (Me Olvidaste)"	4:38
12.	"Los Recuerdos No Abrazan"	4:39
13.	"Baby, Olvídame"	4:43
14.	"Perdidos" (Versión Balada)	4:05
Total length:		01:00:10

== Charts ==
=== Weekly charts ===
Chart (2004)	Peak Position
US Billboard 200	193
US Heatseekers Albums (Billboard)	12
US Top Latin Albums (Billboard)	7
US Tropical Albums (Billboard)	1

=== Year-end charts ===
Chart (2005)	Position
US Tropical Albums (Billboard)	4

Chart (2006)	Position
US Tropical Albums (Billboard)	7

== See also ==
- List of number-one Billboard Tropical Albums from the 2000s
