= Wow Flash! =

Studio album by Elvis Crespo
- Released: November 21, 2000
- Studio: A030 Recording
- Genre: Merengue, pop
- Label: Epic, Sony Discos
- Producer: Jan Duclerc, Alejandro Jaen, Omar Alfano, Jose Lugo, Elvis Crespo

Elvis Crespo chronology
| The Remixes (2000) | Wow Flash! (2000) | Urbano (2002) |

Singles from Wow Flash!
- 1. "Wow Flash!" Released: October 9, 2000; 2. "Mi Sol, Mi Luna" Released: January 22, 2001; 3. "La Noche" Released: April 23, 2001

Professional ratings
Review scores
| Source | Rating |
|---|---|
| Allmusic | 2.5/5 stars |

Wow Flash! is the third studio album by Elvis Crespo.

The song "Wow Flash!" is featured in the film Training Day (2001). It is the first known merengue album that also contains pop songs.

== Track listing ==
1. "Wow Flash!" (Merengue) 3:15
2. "Bella Flor" 4:04
3. "No Me Olvidaras" (Merengue) 4:52
4. "Mi Sol, Mi Luna" 4:02
5. "Me Mata 3:42
6. "Cuando Me Entrego Al Amor" 4:39
7. "La Bolita" 3:42
8. "La Noche" 4:39
9. "Mares De Emocion" 3:58
10. "Solos Tu Y Yo" 4:37
11. "El Regalito" 4:11
12. "No Me Olvidaras" (Balada) 4:27
13. "Wow Flash!" (Pop Version) 3:48

== Personnel ==
- Concertina - A. Oliva
- Composer, Production Director, Background Vocals - Alejandro Jaén
- Background Vocals - Corinne Oviedo
- Tamboura - Darío del Rosario
- Bass - Eliezer González
- Composer, Primary Artist, Producer, Vocals - Elvis Crespo
- Baritone Saxophone - Ernesto Sanchez
- Violin - Fernando Medina
- Piano - Freddy Méndez
- Mixing - Gerardo "Papo" Ríos
- Background Vocals - Henry Garcia
- Guitar - Ito Serrano
- Background Vocals - J. Aguirre
- Piano - Jaime Ramírez
- Arranger, Composer, Director, Producer, Trumpet - Jan Duclerc
- Composer - Joe Arroyo
- Trombone - Jorge Diaz
- Guitar - Jorge Laboy
- Associate Producer, Mixing - José Gazmey
- Arranger, Keyboard, Programming, Keyboards, Producer - José Lugo
- Tamboura - Junny Brito
- Arranger, Keyboards, Piano - Luiggy Santiago
- Background Vocals - Luis Colon
- Alto Saxophone - Luisín del Rosario
- Violin - Mariano Morales
- Composer - Meg Evans
- Bass - Miguel Gonzalez
- Composer - Omar Alfanno
- Photography - Omar Cruz
- Executive Producer - Oscar Llord
- Bombo, Congas - Pablo Padín
- Drums, Percussion - Pepe Jimenez
- Art Direction - Peter Hannert
- Background Vocals - Rafael Estrella
- Composer - Raldy Vázquez
- Drums, Percussion - Richard Bravo
- Composer - Richard Mercado
- Composer, Guira - Richard Mercado
- Engineer, Mixing Assistant - Richie Perez
- Engineer - Ricky Marti
- Background Vocals - Rita Quintero
- Composer - Rodolfo Barreras
- Recorder - Rolando Alejandro
- Engineer - Sonny Hernandez
- Background Vocals - Tito Allen
- Background Vocals - Tommy Torres
- Trumpet - Tommy Villarini
- Mastering - Vic Anesini
- Trumpet - Vicente Cusi Castillo
- Composer - William Paz
- Alto Saxophone - Ángel Torres

== Charts ==
| Chart (2000–2001) | Peak position |
|---|---|
| US Latin Albums (Billboard) | 5 |
| US Tropical Albums (Billboard) | 1 |

== Sales and certifications ==
| Region | Certification | Certified units/sales |
|---|---|---|
| United States (RIAA) | Platinum (Latin) | 100,000^{^} |
^{^} Shipments figures based on certification alone.

== See also ==
- List of number-one Billboard Tropical Albums from the 2000s
