= Regresó el Jefe =

Studio album by Elvis Crespo
- Released: June 5, 2007
- Genre: Merengue
- Label: Machete Music

Elvis Crespo chronology
| Saboréalo (2004) | Regresó el Jefe (2007) | Indestructible (2010) |

Singles from Regresó el Jefe
- 1. "Échate Pa'ca" Released: 2007; 2. "La Foto Se Me Borro" Released: 2007; 3. "Lloré y Lloré" Released: 2008

Regresó el Jefe (in English, The Boss Has Returned) is the sixth studio album by Elvis Crespo that was released to the public on June 5, 2007. It is Crespo's first album in three years.

The album features special appearances by fellow Puerto Rican merengue singer Giselle, and Dominican singers Los Hermanos Rosario. Also, the first single - "La Foto se me Borró" - features the vocals of a new merengue group produced by Crespo called Zone D'Tambora.

The song "Échate Pa'Cá" was the song that Puerto Rican group Grupo Manía (Crespo's previous group) popularized after Crespo briefly rejoined the group for a tour entitled The Originals.

== Track listing ==
All songs written by E. Crespo, except where noted.

1. "20 Aky"
2. "La Foto Se Me Borró"(E. Crespo, Zone D' Tambora)
3. "Con el Tiempo y un Ganchito"
4. "Bambaribiri"(E. Crespo, ñejo)
5. "Llore y Llore"
6. "Tala Tala"
7. "Mi Fracaso"
8. "Los Caminos de la Vida" (E. Crespo, Los Hermanos Rosario)
9. "Ito Ito Bonito"
10. "Te Veo Triste" (E. Crespo, Gisselle)
11. "Así Es La Vida"
12. "Échate Pa'Cá" (E. Crespo, Grupo Manía)
13. "La Foto Se Me Borró" (Bachata Mix)(E. Crespo, Zone D' Tambora)

== Personnel ==
- Tamboura - Alexis Frias
- Vestuario - Ed Coriano
- Arranger, Composer, Coro, Executive Producer, Primary Artist, Producer - Elvis Crespo
- Arranger - Freddie Méndez
- Primary Artist - Gisselle
- Primary Artist - Grupo Manía
- Coro - Henry Garcia
- Bajo Sexto - Isaias Leclerc
- Trumpet - Jesús Alonso
- Guira - Joe Villegas
- Guitar - Jorge Laboy
- Saxophone - José Luis Díaz
- Composer - Juan Gabriel
- Design, Digital Art - Judy Figueroa
- Primary Artist - Los Hermanos Rosario
- Trumpet - Luis Aquino
- Bajo Sexto - Luis Rosario
- Piano - Michael Sanabria
- Primary Artist - Nejo
- Photography - Omar Cruz
- Composer, Coro - Oscar Serrano
- Guira - Papi Rosario
- Tamboura - Pedro Angulo
- Engineer - Polo Parra
- Recording - Rafa Rosario
- Congas - Rafael Concepción
- Tamboura - Rafael Rivera
- Guira - Rafael Torres
- Composer - Reyli Barba
- Coro - Reynold Sosa
- Arranger, Direction, Piano - Richard Marcell
- Arranger, EWI, Keyboards, Producer, Programming, Saxophone - Roberto Cora
- Guitar - Robinson Hernandez
- Coro, Engineer, Mezcla, Trumpet - Rolando Alejandro
- Coros, Vocals - Socky Torres
- Bajo Sexto - Victor Cruz
- Cabelo, Make-Up - Wanda Montes
- Primary Artist - Zone D'Tambora

== Charts ==
| Chart (2007) | Peak position |
|---|---|
| US Latin Albums (Billboard) | 17 |
| US Tropical Albums (Billboard) | 2 |
