= No Es Una Novela =

2006 single by Monchy y Alexandra

Single by Monchy & Alexandra

from the album Éxitos y Más
- Released: 2006
- Recorded: 2006
- Genre: Bachata
- Length: 3:41
- Label: J&N Records; JVN Music

Monchy & Alexandra singles chronology
"Tu Sin Mi y Yo Sin Ti" (2005)	"No Es Una Novela" (2006)	"Cuando Zarpa El Amor" (2008)

Music video
- "No Es Una Novela" on YouTube

"No Es Una Novela" ("It Is Not A Soap Opera") is a song by Dominican bachata duo Monchy & Alexandra. It was released as the lead single for their greatest hits album Éxitos y Más (2006). The song was awarded Tropical Song of the Year at the 19th Lo Nuestro Awards in 2007.

== Track listings ==
CD single

1. "No Es Una Novel"

== Charts ==
Chart (2006)	Peak position
US Hot Latin Tracks (Billboard)	29
US Latin Rhythm Airplay (Billboard)	32
US Tropical Songs (Billboard)	1
