= Confesiones (Monchy & Alexandra album) =

Studio album by Monchy y Alexandra
- Released: March 12, 2002
- Length: 57:46
- Labels: J&N Records; JVN Music; Sony Discos

Monchy y Alexandra chronology
Unplugged (2000)	Confesiones (2002)	The Mix (2003)

Singles from Confesiones
- 1. "Te Quiero Igual Que Ayer" Released: 2002; 2. "Dos Locos" Released: 2003

Professional ratings
Review scores
Source	Rating
Allmusic	3/5 stars

Confesiones (English: Confessions) is Monchy & Alexandra's second studio album. It was released on March 12, 2002.

== Track listing ==
No.	Title	Length
1.	"Te Quiero Igual Que Ayer" (Bachata Version)	4:19
2.	"Dos Locos"	4:06
3.	"Eras Diferente"	5:02
4.	"No Regresaré"	4:55
5.	"Ven, Dime Como Hago"	4:00
6.	"Polo Opuesto"	4:02
7.	"Cuando No Se Puede Olvidar"	4:17
8.	"Te Amaría"	5:05
9.	"El Precio De Tu Engaño"	4:47
10.	"Aquí Estaré"	5:12
11.	"En Un Dos Por Tres"	3:51
12.	"El Soñador"	4:00
13.	"Te Quiero Igual Que Ayer" (Merengue Version)	4:32
14.	"Te Quiero Igual Que Ayer" (Balada Version)	3:42
Total length:		57:46

== Charts ==
=== Weekly charts ===
Chart (2002)	Peak Position
US Heatseekers Albums (Billboard)	47
US Top Latin Albums (Billboard)	8
US Tropical/Salsa Albums (Billboard)	2

=== Year-end charts ===
Chart (2002)	Position
US Tropical/Salsa Albums (Billboard)	3

Chart (2003)	Position
US Tropical/Salsa Albums (Billboard)	11
