= Polo Opuesto =

2003 single by Monchy y Alexandra

Single by Monchy & Alexandra

from the album Confesiones and The Mix
- Released: 2003
- Recorded: 2002
- Genre: Bachata
- Length: 4:00
- Label: J&N Records; JVN Music

Monchy & Alexandra singles chronology
"Dos Locos" / "Te Quiero Igual Que Ayer" (2003)	"Polo Opuesto" (2003)	"Perdidos" (2004)

Music video
- "Polo Opuesto" on YouTube

"Polo Opuesto" ("Polar Opposite"), also known as "Polos Opuestos" ("Polar Opposites"), is a song by Dominican Bachata duo Monchy & Alexandra. It is the sixth track of their second studio album, Confesiones (2002). It was later released as the lead single from their remix album The Mix (2003).

== Track listings ==
CD single

1. "Polo Opuesto"

== Charts ==
Chart (2004)	Peak position
US Tropical Songs (Billboard)	7
