= Monchy & Alexandra =

Dominican bachata duo

- Origin: Dominican Republic
- Genre: Bachata
- Instrument: Vocals
- Years active: 1998–2008; 2019
- Label: JVN Music
- Members: Ramón Rijo (Monchy); Alexandra Cabrera de la Cruz

Monchy & Alexandra were a bachata musical group from the Dominican Republic. They sang together as a duo beginning in 1998. Their first big hit was "Hoja En Blanco", which they released in 1999. Since then, they had many other hits, such as "Hasta El Fin" and "Perdidos", both from their 2004 album Hasta el Fin, as well as "No Es Una Novela" from their 2006 Éxitos y Más album. They have been often credited with being instrumental in popularizing bachata music outside of the Dominican Republic.

== History ==
=== Formation, Hoja En Blanco, Confesiones, and international success (1998-2003) ===
Monchy (real name Ramón Rijo, born 19 September 1977 in La Romana) first performed in a group in the Dominican Republic, which earned him a place in the recording of the Bachatazos series of releases. Alexandra (full name Alexandra Cabrera de la Cruz, born 19 October 1978 in Santo Domingo) was attending a university in 1998, but her studies were put on hold when the opportunity arose to audition for arranger/producer Martires De Leon and executive producer Victor Reyes, who were looking for someone to pair with Monchy. Alexandra won and began the duo that would become Monchy & Alexandra. The pair's first hit, in fact, was recorded without the two having ever met in person; Rijo recorded his vocal while the search for a female duet partner was still in progress.

Monchy & Alexandra released their debut album Hoja En Blanco in 1999. Promotion of the album was slowed by visa problems and unauthorized cover versions. Even so, slowly, requests for the song began to flood into Miami, leading tropical radio stations WXDJ and WRTO to launch Sunday-afternoon bachata programs and to incorporate the music style into their regular programming. Miami station WXDJ even added the word "bachata" to its slogan. They were the first bachata act to perform on the show Sabado Gigante in April 2001, after their single "Hoja En Blanco" began to finally climb the Billboard charts in the US. Cabrera credited their success in part to their early singles' roots in the vallenato genre, noting that vallenato lyrics traditionally are "sweeter [and] more romantic" in contrast to the traditionally bitter lyrics favored in the male-dominated bachata scene. The following year, they released their first live album Unplugged. Around this time Sony Discos (now Sony Music Latin) would start distributing their albums. Their debut album was re-released in 2001. In the same year, they were featured in the compilation album Bachatazos Del 2001 with the song "Palomita Blanca".

The duo released their second studio album Confesiones on March 5, 2002. According to Monchy, the duo waited two years before releasing their next album in order to "put out something superior to their debut album". Label executives from J&N worked hard to improve the odds for commercial success for the second album. Their marketing efforts included a $300,000 national TV advertising campaign for the U.S., including Puerto Rico, (consisting of 30 and 60 second spots) and a $17,000 video filmed in Miami. This marketing campaign was the first time for such in a bachata group; prior to that all marketing had concentrated on compilation albums. The album's lead single "Te Quiero Igual Que Ayer" was written by the same composer, Wilfran Castillo, that penned "Hoja En Blanco". On the Billboard charts, the song peaked at number 21 on Hot Latin Tracks, and peaked at number 2 on Tropical Airplay chart. It won "Tropical Airplay Song of the Year, Duo or Group" at the 2003 Latin Billboard Music Awards, which was the same show in which the duo also won "Tropical Album of the Year, Duo or Group" for their second studio album. It was the first two major awards they won in their careers. It also featured the single Dos Locos, which was added as a sound track for GTA Online: The Contract (2021), in the fictional radio station Motomami Los Santos.

Another song that is featured on some editions of the second studio album is the song "Polo Opuesto", which would be released as the lead single in 2003 to promote their first remix album titled The Mix. The remix album was released on June 10, 2003. The album contains remixes of some of their best songs. They were remixed in different genres. It peaked at number 5 on the Billboard Tropical Albums chart. In the same year, they were featured in the song "Con Un Nudo En La Garganta", which was part of a collaboration album titled Memin Y Sus Invitados from Dominican musician Memin.

=== Hasta El Fin and Éxitos y Más (2004-2008) ===
On October 19, 2004, they released their third and final studio album Hasta El Fin. It became their first album the reach the Billboard 200 as it peaked at 193. It also became their first number 1 album on the Billboard Tropical Albums chart. It features the singles "Tu Sin Mi y Yo Sin Ti", "Hasta El Fin", and "Perdidos", which became their first song to reach the Billboard 100 as it peaked at number 92. It also became their first number 1 hit on the Billboard Tropical Songs chart. In the same year, they were featured in the song "Comentarios" by La Hill. In 2005, the duo performed with Salvadoran singer Álvaro Torres, He Venido A Pedirte Perdón, on an album contributing to Mexican singer, Juan Gabriel.

On March 28, 2006, the duo released their first greatest hits album Éxitos y Más. The album featured their greatest hit songs. In addition, it also included 3 new songs which were "Te Regalo", "Corazón Prendido", and "No Es Una Novela", which was released as the main single for the album. The single became the second number 1 hit on the Billboard Tropical Songs chart. It won Tropical Song of the Year at the 19th Lo Nuestro Awards. The album itself was awarded Tropical Album of the Year on the same show. Also in 2006 were included in the songs "Dame una Noche" with Dominican rapper Don Miguelo for his album Contra El Tiempo, and "La Otra" with merengue rap group Ilegales for the group's album La Republica. On May 20, 2008, they released their second live album and concert film En Vivo Desde Bellas Artes. It was recorded live at a concert that took place at the Luis A. Ferré Performing Arts Center (also known as Bellas Artes) in San Juan, Puerto Rico. It peaked at number 2 on the Billboard Tropical Albums chart.

=== Break up and embarking in separate careers (2008-2018) ===
In 2008, they released the single "Cuando Zarpa El Amor". This would be the last single they released together before officially splitting in the same year. On September 15, 2008, Monchy announced that the group would be breaking up. He attributed the decision to split solely to Alexandra. In said that, "The decision was Alexandra's. I still don't know the reasons why, only that when I was informed about this, the reasons were not explained to me and this occurred while we were on a European tour, in Milan, Italy." Monchy disputed rumors that the split was over money.

After the split, Monchy left J&N Records and decided to start a new duo with another women Nathalia (born Carmen Luisa Reyes) to form the duo Monchy & Nathalia. They released their eponymous debut album in 2011. It was distributed by Terra Music Inc. and Universal Music Latin Entertainment. The two singles for this album were the songs "No Saber De Tí" and "Hasta El Alma". The duo ended a few years later and Monchy went on to pursue a solo career.

As for Alexandra, she continued with J&N Records as a solo act and released her first solo single "Que Te Creiste Tú". In the same year, she started her first collaborations as a solo singer with artists like Jandy Feliz and Daniel Monción. Then in 2012, she released her second single "No Es Tarde" featuring a singer named Nikolaz. In 2013, she released the song "Lo Que Tu Me Das", which served as the first single for her first solo studio album titled Estar Sin Ti, which was released on February 9, 2016. Its second single, which album is named after, was released as an ep with for versions of the song. She then went on to release more singles like "A Dormir Juntitos" featuring Eddy Herrera, "Y Aquí Estoy" which is a cover of an Ana Gabriel song, "Ángeles Desnudos", "El Teléfono", among others. Around this time, she had dubbed herself La Reina De La Bachata (The Queen of Bachata), thus going under the name Alexandra La Reina (Alexandra The Queen).

=== Reunion and Monchy going solo (2019-present) ===
In 2019, the duo reunited to collaborate on a track titled "Años Luz" with Romeo Santos for his fourth studio album, Utopía. Prior to the making of the song, Santos had to get permission from J&N Records to have both Monchy and Alexandra to work together again. This is due to the fact that Monchy had signed a contract that terminated his contractual relationship with J&N and prohibit him from ever working with Alexandra as per J&N demands. This contract was made when Monchy had departed from the record label. On September 21, 2019, the duo performed the song with Santos as part of his Utopía concert at MetLife Stadium. The performance is featured in the concert film and live album, Utopía Live from MetLife Stadium. The duo only reunited for the song as they would continue with their separate paths. In the same year, J&N release their third compilation and greatest hits album Dos Locos, named after their single from 2002.

On June 19, 2020, Monchy released his first solo album titled Primogénito. In the same year, Alexandra continued her solo career releasing more singles and albums. She has collaborated with more artists like Chiko Swagg, Gustavo Enrique, Daniel Santacruz, Henry Santos, among others. She released her greatest hits album Grandes Éxitos on September 21, which featured hits from her solo career and hits from her time with Monchy. On November 12, she released her first live album titled Concierto Virtual. It is based on a virtual concert she performed during the COVID-19 pandemic. In 2021, she released the EP, Bachata Queen. In 2022 she released the collaborative album Dúos Entre Amigos, which included artists on every song.

== Legacy ==
Monchy & Alexandra are considered the greatest duo in the history of bachata, a genre which is mostly dominated by solo artists. Also, Alexandra became one of the greatest female musicians in the genre, thus being dubbed the Queen of Bachata. Hits like "Hoja En Blanco", "Te Quiero Igual Que Ayer", "Perdidos", "No Es Una Novela", among others, helped with the expansion of bachata by giving it a different vibe to the genre. They were one of the first bachata acts to obtain mainstream fame in the Latin community in the United States. They are considered pioneers of the genre and are a hybrid between tradition and pop style bachata. They have been recognized by some of the most prestigious organizations of the Hispanic music business. They have been nominated for the Billboard Latin Music Awards, Premios Cassandra, Premios Lo Nuestro and a Latin Grammy. The duo has achieved a large amount of success in a relatively short amount of time. They have open doors for more duos to be formed in the genre, especially male-female duos like Carlos & Alejandra, JFab & Poala Fabre, among others.

== Discography ==
=== Studio ===
- Hoja En Blanco (1999)
- Confesiones (2002)
- Hasta El Fin (2004)

=== Live ===
- Unplugged (2000)
- En Vivo Desde Bellas Artes (Live from Bellas Artes) (2008)

=== Compilations ===
- Éxitos & Más (2006)
- 1 (2015)

=== Remix ===
- The Mix (2003)

=== Post-duo albums ===
Monchy

- Monchy & Nathalia (2011) - with Nathalia
- Primogénito (2020) - Solo

Alexandra

- Estar Sin Ti (2016) - Studio
- Grandes Éxitos (2020) - Greatest Hits
- Concierto Virtual (2020) - Live
- Bachata Queen (2021) - EP
- Dúos Entre Amigos (2022) - Collaborative

== Notes ==
a: The press release actually said in Spanish, "La decisión fue de Alexandra, los motivos no los conozco todavía, ya que al momento de informarme sobre esto no me explicó las razones y sucedió mientras realizábamos la gira europea específicamente en Milán, Italia".
