= Tu Sin Mi y Yo Sin Ti =

2005 single by Monchy y Alexandra

Single by Monchy & Alexandra

from the album Hasta El Fin
- Released: 2005
- Recorded: 2004
- Genre: Bachata
- Length: 3:42
- Label: J&N Records; JVN Music

Monchy & Alexandra singles chronology
"Hasta El Fin" (2004)	"Tu Sin Mi y Yo Sin Ti" (2005)	"No Es Una Novela" (2005)

Music video
- "Hasta El Fin" on YouTube

"Tu Sin Mi y Yo Sin Ti" ("You Without Me and Me Without You") is a song by Dominican bachata duo Monchy & Alexandra. It was released as the third single from their third studio album Hasta El Fin (2004).

== Track listings ==
CD single

1. "Tu Sin Mi Y Yo Sin Ti" - 3:42
2. "Tu Sin Mi Y Yo Sin Ti" (TV Track) - 3:41
3. "Tu Sin Mi Y Yo Sin Ti" (Guitar Mix) - 3:40
4. "Tu Sin Mi Y Yo Sin Ti" (Vocal) - 3:26

== Charts ==
Chart (2005)	Peak position
US Tropical Songs (Billboard)	19
