= Perdidos =

2004 single by Monchy y Alexandra

Single by Monchy & Alexandra

from the album Hasta El Fin
- Released: November 4, 2004
- Recorded: 2004
- Genre: Bachata
- Length: 4:28
- Label: J&N Records; JVN Music

Monchy & Alexandra singles chronology
"Polo Opuesto" (2003)	"Perdidos" (2004)	"Hasta El Fin" (2004)

Music video
- "Perdidos" on YouTube

"Perdidos" ("Lost") is a song by Dominican bachata duo Monchy & Alexandra. It was released as the lead single from their third studio album Hasta El Fin (2004).

== Track listings ==
CD single

1. "Perdidos" (Bachata)
2. "Perdidos" (Balada)
3. "Perdidos" (Instrumental)

== Charts ==
Chart (2004)	Peak position
US Billboard Hot 100	92
US Hot Latin Tracks (Billboard)	3
US Latin Pop Airplay (Billboard)	10
US Tropical Songs (Billboard)	1
