= Ilegales =

Dominican merengue band

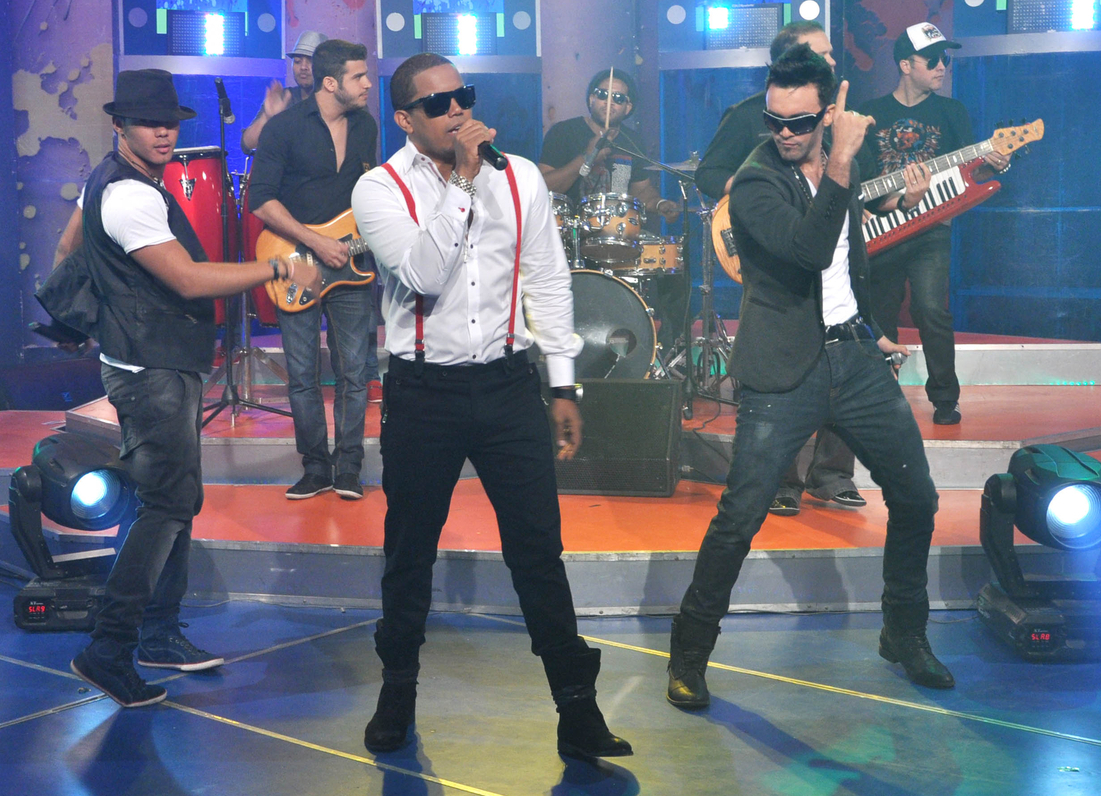

Background information
- Also known as: Los Ilegales
- Origin: Dominican Republic
- Genres: Merengue house
- Years active: 1993 – present
- Labels: BMG, EMI Music, Universal Music, Antena Music, Sony Music, La Oreja Media Group, Inc., Dotel Productions
- Members: Vladimir Dotel; Junior Pimentel; David Diaz
- Past members: Álvaro Guzmán; Jason González + Lenny Medina; Rafael Rivera; Freddy De La Cruz (Anthony); Juan Carlos Campos; Carlos Montaner "Monty"; Leny Pimentel; Danyllo Silveira
- Website: losilegales.com

Ilegales (also called Los Ilegales, "The Illegals") is a Grammy-nominated Dominican merenhouse group, which is one of the main exponents that helped to introduce and establish the merenhouse to the mainstream and get an international audience. The band is well known by hits such as "La Morena", "El Taqui Taqui", "Tu Recuerdo", "La Otra" and "Chucucha". They were one of the first merenhouse acts to perform at Viña del Mar International Song Festival in 1998 and 2003.

Ilegales is one of the best selling Dominican acts, receiving gold and platinum certifications across Latin America, and winning Latin Billboard Music awards, Soberano Awards, and receiving nominations to the Grammy Awards and Latin Grammy Awards on several occasions.

The group is led by singer-songwriter Vladimir Dotel and also includes David Diaz and Junior Pimentel.

== Band history ==
The group was founded in 1993.

In 1995, Ilegales released their debut album and was certified hit. In 1996, the single "La Morena" was a massive hit and Peaked at 6 on RPM Dance Charts in Canada. It was certified Gold in Mexico selling over 100,000 unites, Gold in Venezuela and Platinum in the United States.

In 1998, they won "Best Rap Artist" and "Best Rap Album" for Rebotando at the 1998 Latin Billboard Music Awards. En la Mira, was nominated for "Best Rap Album of The Year" at the 1999 Latin Billboard Music Awards. Also, in that year they performed at Viña del Mar Festival. By the end of 1999, "Ilegales" and "Rebotando" had sold over 1.5 millions of copies worldwide. and where certified four times platinum in Chile.

In 1998 came a terrible loss for the group as one of their members, Jason Gonzalez, died in an automobile accident. Their performances at the 1998 Viña del Mar International Song Festival in Chile were in remembrance of him.

In 1999, "Live" was nominated for Best Merengue Album at the 43rd Grammy Awards.

In 2002, the band was nominated for the Lo Nuestro Award. In addition to reaching the Billboard Tropical charts on their own, the group also had a hit with Alexandra Cabrera De La Cruz of Monchy y Alexandra. They were nominated for the Latin Grammy in 2003 for Best Pop Album.

In 2013, Ilegales received the nomination of "Tropical Songs Artist of the Year, Duo or Group" at the 2013 Billboard Music Awards.

In 2015, Ilegales was nominated as "Best Group or Band" to the Lo Nuestro Award. In that same year, they performed at the Nuryn Sanlley amphitheater to celebrate 20th Anniversary of the band. The Single "Pasarla Bien" with El Potro Alvarez, become their 8th Top 10 on Billboard Tropical Airplay and peaked at number one on Venezuela airplay.

In 2019, Ilegales’ 12th studio album Tropicalia was nominated for Best Contemporary/Tropical Fusion Album at the 20th Annual Latin Grammy Awards.

In 2026, the group launched the 2026 Central American and Caribbean Games official song, Corazón de fiesta, written by Vladimir Dotel.

== Discography ==
=== Studio albums ===
| Title | Year | Charts | | Sales |
| Title | Year | US Latin | US Latin Pop | Sales |
|---|---|---|---|---|
| Ilegales | 1995 | 22 | 12 | |
| Rebotando | 1997 | 15 | 8 | |
| En la Mira | 1998 | — | — | USA: 100,000 |
| On Time | 2000 | — | — | |
| Marca Registrada | 2002 | — | — | |
| In the Room | 2004 | — | — | |
| La República | 2006 | — | — | |
| Hecho en el Patio | 2009 | — | — | |
| Celebration | 2011 | — | — | |
| El Sonido | 2014 | — | — | |
| Inagotable | 2016 | — | — | |
| Tropicalia | 2019 | — | — | |
| 24/7 | 2020 | — | — | |
| Otra Atmósfera | 2022 | — | — | |
| Otro Color | 2023 | — | — | |
| La Fiesta | 2024 | — | — | |
| Caribeño | 2025 | — | — | |
Albums that did not chart are denoted with an "—".

=== Live albums ===
- Live (1999)
- El Sonido en Vivo (2014)

=== Compilation albums ===
- Remixes (1998)
- Serie 2000 (2000)
- Ilegales: Hits (2002)
- La Historia (2003)
- 10 de Coleccion (2004)
- The Best of - Ultimate Collection: Ilegales (2004)
- Mis Favoritas: Ilegales (2010)

=== Charted singles ===
| Year | Single | Peak chart positions | | | Album |
| Year | Single | US Latin | US Tropical | US Latin Pop | Album |
|---|---|---|---|---|---|
| 1995 | La Morena | — | 8 | — | Ilegales |
| 2000 | La Ladrona | 36 | 11 | — | Live |
| 2001 | "Tu Recuerdo" | 4 | 4 | 3 | On Time |
| 2002 | Te Siento | 20 | 29 | — | Marca Registrada |
| 2002 | "La Cosita" | 41 | 11 | — | Marca Registrada |
| 2002 | "Mi Novia" | — | 17 | — | Marca Registrada |
| 2007 | "La Otra" (featuring Monchy & Alexandra) | 17 | 2 | — | La Republica |
| 2012 | "Ayantame" (featuring El Potro Álvarez) | 49 | 1 | — | Celebration |
| 2013 | "Chucucha" | 25 | 7 | — | El Sonido |
| 2013 | "No me diga que no" (featuring Shelow Shaq) | — | 10 | — | Inagotable |
| 2014 | "La Pastilla" | — | 9 | — | Inagotable |
| 2014 | "Pasarla Bien" | — | 1 | — | Inagotable |
