= Hasta El Fin (song) =

2004 single by Monchy y Alexandra

Single by Monchy & Alexandra

from the album Hasta El Fin
- Released: 2004
- Recorded: 2004
- Genre: Bachata
- Length: 4:13
- Label: J&N Records; JVN Music

Monchy & Alexandra singles chronology
"Perdidos" (2004)	"Hasta El Fin" (2004)	"Tu Sin Mi y Yo Sin Ti" (2005)

Music video
- "Hasta El Fin" on YouTube

"Hasta El Fin" ("Until The End") is a song by Dominican bachata duo Monchy & Alexandra. It was released as the second single from their third studio album Hasta El Fin (2004).

== Track listing ==
CD single

1. "Hasta El Fin"
2. "Hasta El Fin" (Instrumental)

== Charts ==
Chart (2004)	Peak position
US Hot Latin Tracks (Billboard)	25
US Latin Pop Airplay (Billboard)	22
US Tropical Songs (Billboard)	5
