= Hoja En Blanco (song) =

1999 single by Monchy y Alexandra

"Hoja en Blanco"

Single by Monchy & Alexandra

from the album Hoja en Blanco
- Released: 1999
- Recorded: 1998
- Genre: Bachata
- Length: 5:07
- Label: J&N Records; JVN Music

Monchy & Alexandra singles chronology
"Hoja en Blanco" (1999)	"Pasión" (2000)

Music video
- "Hoja En Blanco" on YouTube

"Hoja En Blanco" (Blank Page) Song originally recorded by Los Diablitos del Vallenato in 1997, it belongs to the album called "Nace del Alma". It was written by the Colombian composer Wilfran Castillo and sung by the accordion player Omar Geles and Esmeralda Orozco. The composer was inspired by the story of his friend who went to work for a couple of years and when he returned he found the girl married.

The bachata cover of the song is Monchy & Alexandra's debut single for their debut album Hoja en Blanco (1999). It is a bachata cover of a song that was originally written and performed by the Colombian vallenato band, Los Diablitos. It was successful in the Dominican Republic, Central America, and the United States (mostly in New York, Miami, California, and Puerto Rico).

In 2016 argentinian reggae artist Dread Mar I released a cover in his live album 10 años (en vivo) being by far the most successful song in the LP.

== Charts ==
Chart (2001)	Peak position
US Tropical Songs (Billboard)	13
