= Dos Locos =

2003 single by Monchy y Alexandra

- Side A of a Singles CD

Single by Monchy & Alexandra

from the album Confesiones
- B-side: "Te Quiero Igual Que Ayer"
- Released: 2002
- Recorded: 2002
- Genre: Bachata
- Length: 4:06
- Label: J&N Records; JVN Music

Monchy & Alexandra singles chronology
"Pasión" (2000)	"Dos Locos" / "Te Quiero Igual Que Ayer" (2002)	"Polo Opuesto" (2003)

Music video
- "Dos Locos" on YouTube

"Dos Locos" ("Two Crazies") is a song by Dominican Bachata duo Monchy & Alexandra. It was released as a single from their second studio album Confesiones (2002). The song was featured in GTA Online: The Contract (2021), in the fictional radio station Motomami Los Santos.

== Charts ==
Chart (2003)	Peak Position
US Hot Latin Tracks (Billboard)	43
US Tropical Songs (Billboard)	7
