= Elvis Crespo =

Puerto Rican-American singer (born 1971)

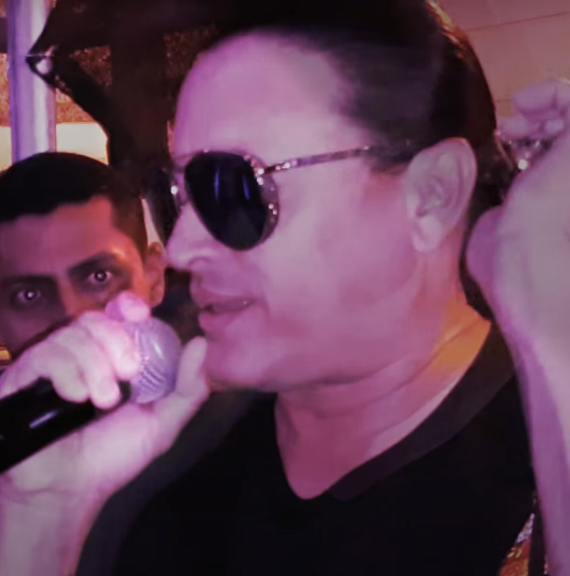
- Crespo in 2018

Background information
- Born: Elvis Crespo Díaz; July 30, 1971 (age 55); New York City, New York, U.S.
- Origin: Guaynabo, Puerto Rico
- Genre: Merengue
- Occupation: Singer
- Years active: 1988–present
- Formerly of: Grupo Manía
- Website: elviscrespo.com (in Spanish and English)

Elvis Crespo Díaz (born July 30, 1971) is an American merengue singer. He has won multiple awards, including a Grammy and a Latin Grammy Award in merengue music.

== Early life ==
Crespo was born in New York City to Puerto Rican parents. He was named "Elvis" after Elvis Presley. He was raised in the city of Guaynabo, Puerto Rico, where he spent his childhood and adolescent years.

== Career ==
Crespo first gained fame in the mid-90s when he joined Grupo Mania, in Puerto Rico. Eventually he decided to go solo in 1998. His debut album, Suavemente, was a hit both in Latin America and in the US. The single "Suavemente" was a huge hit and eventually helped him earn the Best Male Tropical/Salsa Album of the Year from Billboard magazine. His album went platinum in the Venezuelan and Central American markets and gold in Chile. Released in 1998, Crespo's debut also earned a gold album for sales of over 500,000 copies in the first year after its release in the United States. "Suavemente" set a record for holding the top position on Billboard's Hot Latin Tracks chart for six weeks. His album was mostly merengue influenced, but his follow-up albums would venture from these roots eventually. Wow Flash! is Elvis Crespo's third solo recording for Sony Music. Elvis Crespo's latest album, Regresó el Jefe, went on sale on 5 June 2007, with its first single being "La Foto Se Me Borró." He dedicated this album to his niece, Wilmarie Agosto Crespo, who died in a car accident on March 28, 2007. In 2016 Elvis was featured on Deorro's number one hit song "Bailar" which was featured on a Target Corporation Commercial.

== Personal life ==
On March 16, 2009, Crespo married his manager, Maribel Vega, in Puerto Rico. In December 2024, after 15 years of marriage, Elvis Crespo announced his divorce from Maribel Vega. The singer expressed that this chapter of his life was full of learning and highlighted his daughter Génesis as a special blessing. Crespo claimed to be focused on his music and creating new experiences for his followers.

Crespo was investigated by the Miami-Dade Police Department and the Federal Bureau of Investigation (FBI) after he allegedly performed a sex act and exposed himself in view of other passengers aboard an airplane flight from Houston, Texas to Miami, Florida on March 26, 2009. He was interviewed upon his arrival but was not arrested and no charges were filed. When asked by police at the airport about the accusation, Crespo reportedly said "I don’t recall doing that". On July 10, 2013, an intoxicated Crespo was allegedly expelled from a casino in Isla Verde, Puerto Rico for harassing a female employee, before he later became involved in a physical confrontation with local restaurant owner Alexander de Jesús after he attempted to steal a bottle of alcohol from his restaurant. De Jesús subsequently filed a complaint against Crespo, opening a police investigation. In a December 2013 interview with Al Rojo Vivo, Crespo addressed both incidents, saying that he was ashamed, and that his behavior stemmed from his struggles with alcohol and drug addiction.

== Discography ==
Studio albums

- Suavemente (1998)
- Píntame (1999)
- Wow Flash! (2000)
- Urbano (2002)
- Saboréalo (2004)
- Regresó el Jefe (2007)
- Indestructible (2010)
- Los Monsters (2012)
- One Flag (2013)
- Tatuaje (2015)
- Diomedizao (2018)
- Regresó el Jefe 2.0 (2021)
- Multitudes (2021)
- Poeta Herio (2025)

== Awards ==
=== Premio Lo Nuestro ===
1999

- Tropical: Album of the Year (Suavemente)
- Tropical: Male Artist of the Year
- Tropical: Best New Artist
- Tropical: Song of the Year (Suavemente)

2000

- Tropical: Album of the Year (Pintame)
- Tropical: Male Artist of the Year
- Tropical: Song of the Year (Pintame)

2001

- Merengue: Artist of the Year
- People Choice Awards: Tropical Artist of the Year

2003

- Merengue: Artist of the Year

2005

- Merengue: Artist of the Year

2012

- Merengue: Artist of the Year

=== Grammy Awards ===
2000

- Best Merengue Performance (Pintame)

=== Latin Grammys ===
2005

- Best Merengue Album (Saborealo)

== See also ==
- List of Puerto Rican songwriters
- List of Puerto Ricans
- Merengue
