= Te Quiero Igual Que Ayer =

2002 single by Monchy y Alexandra

- Side B of a Singles CD

Single by Monchy & Alexandra

from the album Confesiones
- A-side: "Dos Locos"
- Released: 2002
- Recorded: 2002
- Genre: Bachata
- Length: 4:19
- Label: J&N Records; JVN Music

Monchy & Alexandra singles chronology
"Pasión" (2000)	"Dos Locos" / "Te Quiero Igual Que Ayer" (2002)	"Polo Opuesto" (2003)

Music video
- "Te Quiero Igual Que Ayer" on YouTube

"Te Quiero Igual Que Ayer" ("I Love You Just Like Yesterday") is a song by Dominican Bachata duo Monchy & Alexandra. It was released as a single from their second studio album Confesiones (2002). The song was awarded Tropical Song of the Year at the 2003 Latin Billboard Music Awards.

== Charts ==
Chart (2002)	Peak position
US Hot Latin Tracks (Billboard)	21
US Tropical Songs (Billboard)	2
