= Gloria Estefan singles discography =

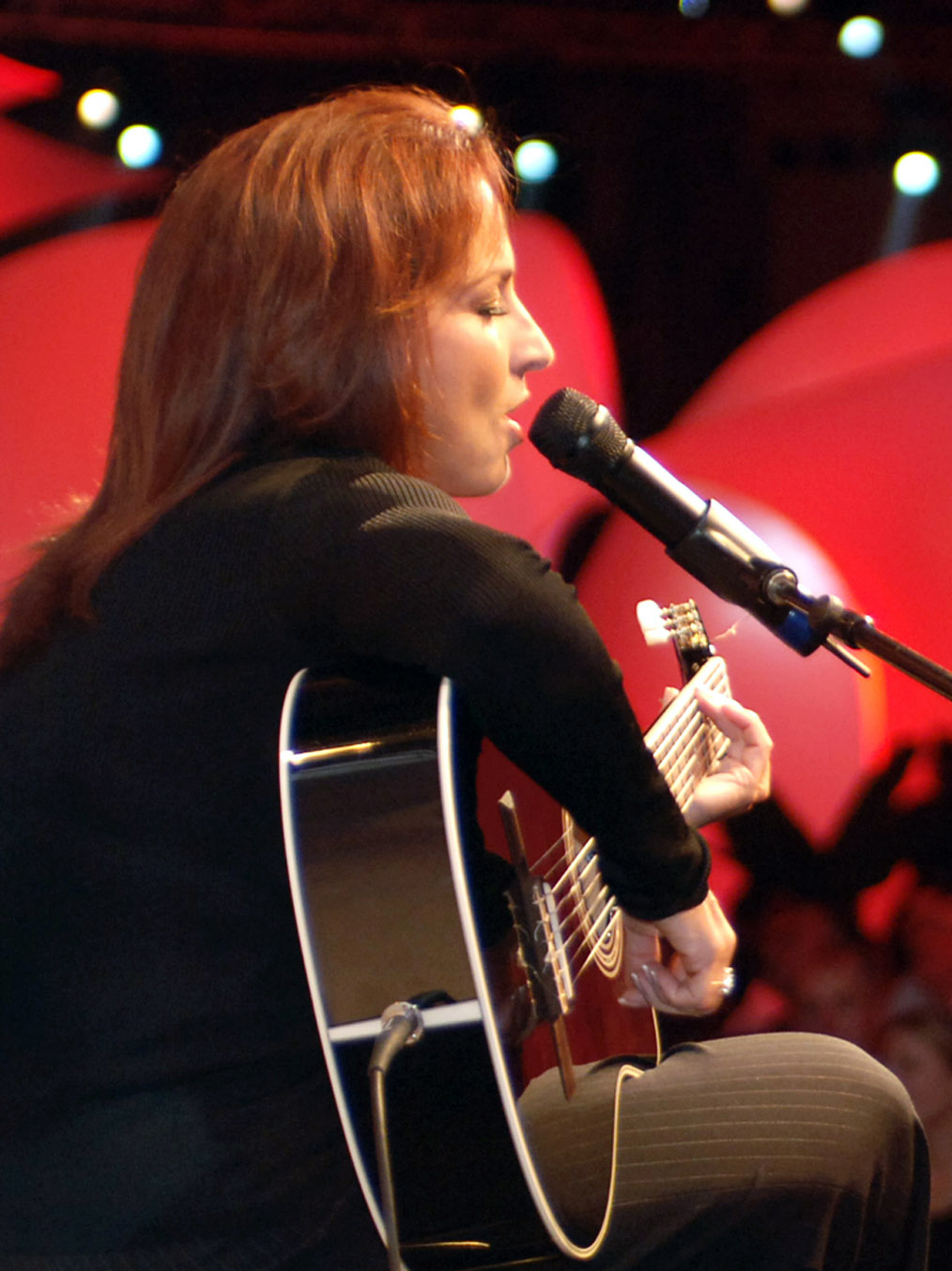
- Gloria Estefan performs for the crew and their families during a special event to celebrate the United Through Reading program.
- Singles: 51
- Promotional singles: 24

The discography of singles, promo singles, remixes and Latin tracks for Cuban-American singer Gloria Estefan and Miami Sound Machine consists of 51 singles and 24 promotional singles. Miami Sound Machine began releasing singles in 1977 and continued until 1989, when Estefan began being credited solely as a solo artist. Miami Sound Machine released a number of commercially successful singles through the late 1980s, including "Conga", "Dr. Beat", "Anything for You", and "Bad Boy". Although Miami Sound Machine was no longer featured in the credits of releases from 1989 onwards, they remain Estefan's backing group until this day, though none of the original members remain.

As a solo artist, Estefan has released a number of commercially successful singles. Among her most successful solo singles in English are "Don't Wanna Lose You", "Get on Your Feet", "Here We Are", "Coming Out of the Dark", and "Turn the Beat Around".

Estefan is the female artist with most number-one hits on the Billboard Hot Latin Songs chart, having a total of fifteen hits spending a combined forty weeks at number 1. Among her most successful Latin singles are "Mi Tierra", "Con Los Años Que Me Quedan", "Abriendo Puertas", "Tres Deseos", "No Me Dejes de Querer" and "Tradición", the latter of which became Gloria's first number-one hit on the Hot Dance Club Songs chart.

== Miami Sound Machine ==
Miami Sound Machine singles discography
- Singles: 27
- Promotional singles: 6
- Other appearances: 2

Miami Sound Machine was fronted by Gloria Estefan from 1977 through 1988.

The band's first chart hit was "Dr. Beat", a top 10 hit in the UK in 1984. The group's breakthrough single in the US came in 1985 with the release of the lead single from their second studio-album Primitive Love. "Conga" made the Top Ten on the Billboard Hot 100 and was also a dance hit globally.

Other big singles came with the release of the group's third studio album, Let It Loose. In the US, the band's fourth single, "Anything for You", became their first-number one song on the Billboard Hot 100. "Can't Stay Away From You" became a number-one hit in the Netherlands.

The band enjoyed continued success with their singles through their final release, "1-2-3", which was a top ten in the United States. Following that release, Gloria Estefan was credited on releases as a solo artist. Her backup group is still referred to as the Miami Sound Machine, however, none of the original members of the group currently perform with Estefan.

=== 1977–1984 ===
Year	Single	Album
1977	"Live Again"	Live Again
1977	"Renacer"	Live Again
1978	"I Want You to Love Me"	Miami Sound Machine
1978	"You've Broken My Heart"	Miami Sound Machine
1978	"Usted Abusó"	Miami Sound Machine
1980	"Regresa a Mí"	Miami Sound Machine
1980	"You're All I Have"	Miami Sound Machine
1980	"No Me Olvidarás (One Day)"	Miami Sound Machine
1981	"Baila Conmigo"	Otra Vez
1981	"Sola"	Otra Vez
1981	"Me Enamoré"	Otra Vez
1982	"No Será Fácil"	Rio
1982	"No Miraré"	Rio
1982	"Yo También Quiero Bailar"	Rio
1982	"Dingui-Li-Bangui"	Rio
1983	"A Toda Máquina"	A Toda Máquina
1983	"Lucharé"	A Toda Máquina
1983	"Comunicación"	A Toda Máquina

=== 1984–1988 ===
Year	Single	Peak chart positions											Certifications (sales thresholds)	Album
Year	Single	US	US Latin	US AC	AUS	CAN	GER	IRE	NLD	SWE	SWI	UK	Certifications (sales thresholds)	Album
1984	"Dr. Beat"	—	—	—	11	5	7	6	3	1	5	6	BPI: Silver	Eyes of Innocence
1984	"Prisoner of Love"	—	—	—	—	—	—	—	—	—	—	98		Eyes of Innocence
1984	"I Need a Man"	—	—	—	—	—	—	—	—	—	—	—		Eyes of Innocence
1984	"I Need Your Love"	—	—	—	—	—	—	—	—	—	—	—		Eyes of Innocence
1985	"Conga"	10	1	—	37	1	1	3	3	8	1	79	RIAA: Gold; BPI: Silver; MC: Gold	Primitive Love
1986	"Bad Boy"	8	—	8	55	10	6	23	2	—	9	16	RIAA: Gold; MC: Gold	Primitive Love
1986	"Words Get in the Way"	5	17	1	44	8	—	—	17	—	—	—		Primitive Love
1986	"Falling in Love (Uh-Oh)"	25	—	3	—	28	—	—	27	—	—	89		Primitive Love
1986	"Hot Summer Nights"	—	—	—	—	—	—	—	—	—	—	—		Top Gun: Original Motion Picture Soundtrack
1987	"Rhythm Is Gonna Get You"	5	—	31	54	11	—	23	31	—	—	16		Let It Loose / Anything for You
1987	"Betcha Say That"	36	—	19	—	37	—	—	—	—	—	—		Let It Loose / Anything for You
1988	"Can't Stay Away from You"	6	—	1	60	18	—	7	1	—	—	7		Let It Loose / Anything for You
1988	"Anything for You"	1	3	1	11	1	8	9	2	2	32	10	RIAA: Gold	Let It Loose / Anything for You
1988	"1-2-3" (Remix)	3	—	1	99	10	—	11	13	7	—	9		Let It Loose / Anything for You
"—" denotes releases that did not chart, were not released, or for which the chart position is unknown.

== Gloria Estefan ==
=== 1989–1995 ===
Year	Single	Peak chart positions											Certifications (sales thresholds)	Album
Year	Single	US	US Latin	US AC	US Dance	AUS	CAN	GER	IRE	NLD	SPA	UK	Certifications (sales thresholds)	Album
1989	"Don't Wanna Lose You"	1	1	2	—	40	3	41	5	12	1	6	RIAA: Gold	Cuts Both Ways
1989	"Get on Your Feet"	11	—	5	20	98	16	46	13	2	—	23		Cuts Both Ways
1990	"Here We Are"	6	—	1	—	20	7	64	7	14	—	23		Cuts Both Ways
1990	"Oye Mi Canto (Hear My Voice)"	48	10	31	—	—	51	28	7	8	—	16		Cuts Both Ways
1990	"Cuts Both Ways"	44	—	1	—	38	38	—	22	—	—	49		Cuts Both Ways
1991	"Coming Out of the Dark"	1	4	1	—	56	1	45	16	15	—	25		Into the Light
1991	"Seal Our Fate"	53	—	44	—	112	63	54	—	—	—	24		Into the Light
1991	"Remember Me with Love"	—	—	—	—	—	—	—	15	—	—	22		Into the Light
1991	"Nayib's Song (I Am Here for You)"	—	—	—	—	—	—	—	—	70	—	—		Into the Light
1991	"Can't Forget You"	43	—	2	—	99	61	—	—	—	—	—		Into the Light
1991	"Live for Loving You"	22	—	2	—	68	32	—	—	54	—	33		Into the Light
1992	"Always Tomorrow"	81	—	5	—	107	36	—	—	17	—	24		Greatest Hits
1992	"Megamix / Miami Hit Mix"	—	—	—	—	119	—	92	12	—	—	8		Greatest Hits
1993	"I See Your Smile"	48	—	3	3	—	31	—	—	—	—	48		Greatest Hits
1993	"Go Away"	— (Note: "Go Away" did not enter the Billboard Hot 100, but peaked at number 3 on the Bubbling Under Hot 100 chart.)	—	—	4	—	—	—	22	—	—	13		Greatest Hits
1993	"Mi Tierra"	—	1	—	5	183	—	77	—	30	1	36		Mi Tierra
1993	"Con Los Años Que Me Quedan"	—	1	—	—	—	—	—	—	—	—	40		Mi Tierra
1993	"Tradición"	—	—	—	1	—	—	—	—	—	—	—		Mi Tierra
1993	"Montuno"	—	—	—	—	—	—	—	—	—	—	55		Mi Tierra
1994	"Mi Buen Amor"	—	1	—	—	—	—	—	—	—	—	—		Mi Tierra
1994	"Turn the Beat Around"	13	—	4	1	8	26	55	—	—	—	21	RIAA: Gold; ARIA: Gold	Hold Me, Thrill Me, Kiss Me
1994	"Hold Me, Thrill Me, Kiss Me"	—	—	—	—	48	—	—	22	—	—	11	BPI: Silver	Hold Me, Thrill Me, Kiss Me
1994	"Everlasting Love"	27	—	5	1	29	19	—	—	—	—	19		Hold Me, Thrill Me, Kiss Me
1994	"It's Too Late"	—	—	31	—	—	72	—	—	—	—	— (Note: "It's Too Late" was not released as a commercial single in the UK, but peaked at number 45 on the UK airplay chart.)		Hold Me, Thrill Me, Kiss Me
1995	"Abriendo Puertas"	—	1	—	3	124	—	—	—	—	1	—		Abriendo Puertas
1995	"Más Allá"	—	1	—	—	—	—	—	—	—	—	—		Abriendo Puertas
1995	"Tres Deseos"	—	12	—	1	—	—	—	—	—	—	—		Abriendo Puertas
"—" denotes releases that did not chart, were not released, or for which the chart position is unknown.

=== 1996–2010 ===
Year	Single	Peak chart positions											Certifications (sales thresholds)	Album
Year	Single	US	US Latin	US AC	AUS	CAN	GER	IRE	SPA	SWE	SWI	UK	Certifications (sales thresholds)	Album
1996	"Reach"	42	2	5	23	28	58	—	2	19	—	15		Destiny
1996	"You'll Be Mine (Party Time)"	70	—	—	118	—	84	—	18	36	—	18		Destiny
1996	"I'm Not Giving You Up"	40	—	9	114	—	—	—	11	—	—	28		Destiny
1996	"Higher"	—	—	—	—	—	—	—	32	—	—	—		Destiny
1997	"No Pretendo"	—	1	—	—	—	—	—	28	—	—	—		Destiny
1998	"Heaven's What I Feel" / "Corazón Prohibido"	27	2	10	105	—	85	27	1	19	38	17		Gloria!
1998	"Oye"	—	1	—	107	—	—	—	1	—	—	33		Gloria!
1998	"Cuba Libre"	—	—	—	—	—	—	—	3	—	—	—		Gloria!
1998	"Don't Let This Moment End"	76	—	30	—	64	—	—	9	—	—	28		Gloria!
1999	"Santo Santo" (with Só Pra Contrariar)	—	2	—	—	—	—	—	2	—	—	—		Juegos De Amor
1999	"Music of My Heart" (with *NSYNC)	2	—	2	112	7	—	—	11	—	—	34	RIAA: Gold	Music of the Heart: The Album
2000	"No Me Dejes De Querer"	77	1	—	—	—	—	—	1	—	76	—		Alma Caribeña
2000	"Como Me Duele Perderte"	—	1	—	—	—	—	—	8	—	—	—		Alma Caribeña
2000	"Tres Gotas De Agua Bendita" (with Celia Cruz)	—	—	—	—	—	—	—	5	—	—	—		Alma Caribeña
2001	"You Can't Walk Away from Love"	—	—	21	—	—	—	—	—	—	—	—		Greatest Hits Vol. II
2001	"Out of Nowhere"	—	—	—	—	—	—	—	22	—	—	94		Greatest Hits Vol. II
2003	"Wrapped" / "Hoy"	— (Note: "Wrapped" did not enter the Billboard Hot 100, but peaked at number 10 on the Bubbling Under Hot 100 chart.)	1	23	—	—	65	—	3	—	3	—	IFPI SWI: Gold	Unwrapped
2003	"I Wish You"	—	—	18	—	—	—	—	—	—	64	—		Unwrapped
2003	"Te Amaré"	—	—	—	—	—	—	—	7	—	—	—		Unwrapped
2004	"Tu Fotografía" / "Your Picture"	— (Note: "Your Picture" did not enter the Billboard Hot 100, but peaked at number 25 on the Bubbling Under Hot 100 chart.)	1	—	—	—	—	—	—	—	—	—		Unwrapped
2007	"No Llores"	— (Note: "No Llores" did not enter the Billboard Hot 100, but peaked at number 17 on the Bubbling Under Hot 100 chart.)	1	—	—	—	—	—	—	—	—	—		90 Millas
2007	"Me Odio"	—	37	—	—	—	—	—	—	—	—	—		90 Millas
"—" denotes releases that did not chart, were not released, or for which the chart position is unknown.

=== 2011–present ===
Year	Single	Peak chart positions		Album
Year	Single	US Latin	US Dance	Album
2011	"Wepa"	28	1	Miss Little Havana
2011	"Miss Little Havana"	—	—	Miss Little Havana
2011	"Hotel Nacional"	1	1	Miss Little Havana
2013	"How Long Has This Been Going On?"	—	—	The Standards
2020	"We Needed Time"	—	—	—N/a
2020	"Cuando Hay Amor"	—	—	Brazil305
2021	"Puedes Llegar" (with Carlos Rivera)	—	—	—N/a
2023	"Gonna Be You" (with Dolly Parton, Belinda Carlisle, Cyndi Lauper and Debbie Harry)	—	—	80 for Brady
2025	"Raíces"	37	—	Raíces
"—" denotes releases that did not chart, were not released, or for which the chart position is unknown.

=== As a featured artist ===
Year	Single	Peak chart positions								Certifications (sales thresholds)	Album
Year	Single	US	AUS	GER	IRE	SPA	SWE	SWI	UK	Certifications (sales thresholds)	Album
1997	"En El Jardín" (Alejandro Fernández featuring Gloria Estefan)	—	—	—	—	—	—	—	—		Me Estoy Enamorando
2003	"What More Can I Give" (with Michael Jackson and various artists)	—	—	—	—	—	—	—	—		non-album single
2005	"Doctor Pressure" (as Mylo vs Miami Sound Machine)	—	12	31	5	—	52	66	3		Destroy Rock & Roll
2010	"Somos El Mundo" ("We Are the World" Spanish Version) (with various artists)	—	—	—	—	31	—	—	—		non-album single
2017	"Almost Like Praying" (Lin-Manuel Miranda with various artists)	20	—	—	—	—	—	—	—		non-album single
2024	"Bemba Colorá" (Sheila E. featuring Gloria Estefan and Mimy Succar)	—	—	—	—	—	—	—	—		Bailar
"—" denotes releases that did not chart, were not released, or for which the chart position is unknown

=== Promotional singles ===
==== 1989–2000 ====
Year	Single	Peak chart positions		Album
Year	Single	US Latin	US Dance	Album
1989	"Hasta Amarte" (with Plácido Domingo)	8	—	Goya: A Life in Song
1990	"Renacer"	7	—	Exitos De Gloria Estefan
1991	"Nayib's Song (I Am Here for You)"	—	—	Into the Light
1993	"¡Si Señor!..."	—	—	Mi Tierra
1993	"Ayer"	5	—	Mi Tierra
1993	"Volverás"	—	—	Mi Tierra
1993	"Mi Tierra De Tradición"	—	—	Mi Tierra
1995	"Cherchez La Femme"	—	19	Hold Me, Thrill Me, Kiss Me
1995	"Dulce Amor"	—	—	Abriendo Puertas
1995	"La Parranda"	31	—	Abriendo Puertas
1995	"Lejos De Ti"	—	—	Abriendo Puertas
1995	"Felicidad"	—	—	Abriendo Puertas
1996	"Abriendo Puertas A La Navidad"	—	—	Abriendo Puertas
1997	"Show Me the Way Back to Your Heart"	—	—	Destiny
1998	"Don't Stop"	—	—	Gloria!
"—"denotes releases that did not chart, were not released, or for which the chart position is unknown

==== 2000–2011 ====
Year	Single	Peak chart positions			Album
Year	Single	US Latin	US AC	SPA	Album
2000	"Dame Otra Oportunidad"	—	—	—	Alma Caribeña
2000	"Tengo Que Decirte Algo"	—	—	—	Alma Caribeña
2000	"Me Voy"	—	—	—	Alma Caribeña
2000	"Por Un Beso"	32	—	—	Alma Caribeña
2001	"Y-Tu-Conga"	—	—	39	Greatest Hits. Vol. II
2007	"Píntame De Colores"	—	—	—	90 Millas
2011	"Right Away"	—	26	—	Miss Little Havana
"—" denotes releases that did not chart, were not released, or for which the chart position is unknown

== See also ==
- List of best-selling music artists
