= 90 Millas World Tour =

2008–09 concert tour by Gloria Estefan

- Tour by Gloria Estefan
- Promotional Poster for Gloria Estefan Tour
- Associated album: 90 Millas
- Start date: August 23, 2008
- End date: November 1, 2009
- Legs: 3
- No. of shows: 16 in Europe; 19 in The Americas; 35 total

Gloria Estefan concert chronology
- Live & Re-Wrapped Tour (2004); 90 Millas World Tour (2008-2009)

The 90 Millas World Tour was the seventh concert tour by singer and songwriter Gloria Estefan, launched in support of her 2007 Spanish-language album 90 Millas. The tour began in Valencia, Spain, on August 22, 2008, and concluded in Monterrey, Mexico, on November 1, 2009. It included 35 shows across Europe and the Americas.

The tour was promoted by concert touring company Live Nation, which also promotes shows for other international acts such as Madonna, U2 and Jay-Z.

== Tour history ==
The tour promoted the album 90 Millas. In May 2008, Estefan told a Spanish newspaper that the tour take place in the summer. This marked the first time in twelve years since Estefan made a tour to the European continent.

The tour started with only two legs, but both were for Europe. The first leg was for the concerts in Valencia and Marbella, Spain. The second leg started with the sold-out concert at Rotterdam, Netherlands and initially the tour would start at The Netherlands, and then will pass to Spain, but at last-time the concert started in Valencia for unknown reasons. Later, in 2009 the second leg was expanded to Latin American countries.

The tour was very simple and was partially made by all the Estefan's greatest hits, adding to some dates different songs at the encore section. At least one song of every album released by Estefan was added to set list:

- From Eyes of Innocence: "Dr. Beat."
- From Primitive Love: "Conga."
- From Let It Loose: "Rhythm Is Gonna Get You," "Can't Stay Away from You," 1-2-3" and "Anything for You" or its Spanish version "No Te Olvidare."
- From Cuts Both Ways: "Don't Wanna Lose You" or its Spanish version "Si Voy a Perderte," "Here We Are," Oye Mi Canto (Hear My Voice)," "Cuts Both Ways" and "Get on Your Feet."
- From Into the Light: "Remember Me with Love," "Live for Loving You" and "Coming Out of the Dark" or its Spanish version "Desde la Oscuridad."
- From Gloria Estefan Greatest Hits: "Always Tomorrow" and "I See Your Smile".
- From Mi Tierra: "Mi Tierra," "Con Los Años Que Me Quedan," "Si Señor!..." and Ayer."
- From Hold Me Thrill Me Kiss Me: "Turn the Beat Around," "Everlasting Love" and "Hold Me, Thrill Me, Kiss Me."
- From Abriendo Puertas: "Tres Deseos," "Abriendo Puertas," and "Más Allá."
- From Destiny: "Reach," "Higher," "Show Me the Way Back to Your Heart," You'll Be Mine (Party Time)," and "No Pretendo."
- From Gloria!: "Heaven's What I Feel" or its Spanish version "Corazon Prohibido," "Oye!," Cuba Libre" and "I Just Wanna Be Happy."
- From Alma Caribeña: "No Me Dejes de Querer."
- From Unwrapped: "Hoy" or its English version "Wrapped," "I Wish You" and "Tu Fotografía" or its English version, "Your Picture."
- From 90 Millas: "No Llores," "Morenita," "Caridad," and "Bésame."

Estefan sang the collaboration with Só Pra Contrariar "Santo Santo" as part of the encore of the Tenerife concert; this time the song was sung a cappella and with the public. The song was later added to the running order in her concerts of 2009 as a virtual duet with Só Pra Contrair on the video screen.

Estefan also made some covers, the first was Connie Francis hit "Where the Boys Are;" this song was sung at the concerts in London, Belfast, Rotterdam, and Hollywood. Another cover made by Estefan was her collaboration with Jennifer Lopez "Let's Get Loud" which was written by Estefan herself for Lopez's debut album. For the Madrid and Tenerife concerts Estefan made a cover of Joselito with his song "El Ruiseñor". In Liverpool, she sang a cover of "One Day in Your Life" as a tribute to Michael Jackson.

For the British concert on September 10, 2008, Estefan added a special song for the show, her rendition of Mel Carter's "Hold Me, Thrill Me, Kiss Me," which is until today one of Estefan's biggest selling singles at the UK.

Estefan also made some other encores at other concerts, at Madrid, Estefan made again the same rendition as she did at the Wembley Stadium of Mel Carter, and she also sang an acoustic version of her song "Always Tomorrow" and the cover of Joselito.

Though not included at first at the places to visit of the tour, Estefan was named along with REO Speedwagon the headliners for the 2008 Aruba Music Festival, leading to a free performance at October 11.

One of the highlights of the tour was when Estefan surprised the audience and brought out her 13-year-old daughter Emily. The audience received Emily with an ovation and she performed to the audience playing the electric guitar and the drums in all the tour. Emily Estefan made a cover of Alice Cooper's "School's Out". In 2009 the song was replaced by Wild Cherry's "Play That Funky Music."

== Latin American leg ==
The tour was rescheduled for performances at some Latin American countries such as Uruguay, Chile, Argentina, Peru and Ecuador. For some countries such as Uruguay, it was the first time Estefan came to visit during her music career, while for Argentina it was the first time in almost ten years to come around again. Although is the same leg of the above-mentioned, the show was renamed "90 Millas - The Latin American Tour 2009".

The show at Uruguay is one of the most successful concerts given by Estefan and due to the high and fast sales of the tickets, another date was added. The two concerts at Uruguay were sold-out.

=== Jalisco en Vivo 2009 ===
Though not included at first, due to the main problem of the Swine influenza illness around the world, Estefan, along with other Latin American artists, would perform at a free concert, called "Jalisco en Vivo 2009," at Guadalajara, Mexico as part of a free-concert series in which Alejandro Fernández, who worked before with Estefan for the song "En El Jardín" was the official organizer of a campaign to promote tourism in Mexico after the epidemic. Estefan performed "Con Los Años Que Me Quedan" as well as the duets, "En El Jardín" and "Si Nos Dejan" with Alejandro Ferenández at the Glorieta de la Minerva. The date officially given for the performance was on June 27, 2009.

=== Continuing 90 Millas ===
Estefan extended her 90 Millas Latin American Tour starting in Puerto Rico on October 10, along with a show in Panama, and the closing of the tour in Mexico.

== Set list ==
1. "Oye!"
2. "Rhythm Is Gonna Get You"
3. "Tres Deseos"
4. "Con Los Años Que Me Quedan"
5. "Bésame^{3}
6. "No Pretendo" ^{3} ^{7}
7. "Don't Wanna Lose You"/"Si Voy a Perderte"^{4} ^{7}
8. "Here We Are"^{4}
9. "Can't Stay Away From You" ^{4} ^{6}
10. "Where the Boys Are" (Cover of song made popular by Connie Francis)^{5}
11. "Morenita"^{3} ^{4}
12. "Ayer" ^{3} ^{7}
13. "No Me Dejes de Querer" ^{3} ^{7}
14. "Let's Get Loud" (Cover of song made popular by Jennifer Lopez)
15. "1-2-3" ^{4} ^{6} ^{7}
16. Medley: "Renacer" / "Regresa A Mi" / "No Sera Facil"^{7}
17. "School's Out" (Cover of Alice Cooper)^{2}
18. "Hoy" / "Wrapped" ^{1}
19. "Abriendo Puertas"^{1}
20. "Santo Santo"^{7}
21. "Heaven's What I Feel" / "Corazón Prohibido" ^{3} ^{4} ^{7}
22. "Everlasting Love"
23. "Your Picture"/"Tu Fotografía"
24. "Anything for You"/"No Te Olvidare"
25. "Reach" / "Puedes Llegar" ^{3} ^{4} ^{7}
26. "I Wish You"^{7}
27. "No Llores"
28. "Cuba Libre" ^{8}
29. Medley: Mi Tierra" / "Oye Mi Canto (Hear My Voice)"
30. "Turn the Beat Around"
31. "Conga"
32. "Dr. Beat"
33. "Get on Your Feet"
34. "I Just Wanna Be Happy"
35. "Live for Loving You" ^{4} ^{6} ^{7}
36. "Higher" ^{5} ^{6} ^{7}
37. "Always Tomorrow"^{5} ^{6}
38. "Caridad" ^{5} ^{6} ^{7}
39. "You'll Be Mine (Party Time)" ^{7}
40. "Coming Out of the Dark" / "Desde la Oscuridad" ^{7}

^{1}Added to the running order in 2009.
^{2}Song performed by Gloria's daughter, Emily Estefan. In 2009 replaced by Wild Cherry's "Play That Funky Music."
^{3}Performed in all Spain dates in 2008.
^{4}Performed in all the 2008 dates outside Spain.
^{5}Performed in select 2008 dates outside Spain.
^{6}Performed in select Spain dates.
^{7}Performed in select 2009 dates.
^{8}Added to the running order in Zaragoza.

== Additional notes ==
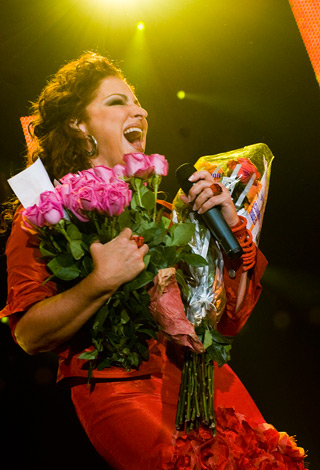
Estefan at one of the shows in Rotterdam, Netherlands

- In Valencia only 15 songs were performed, (Oye, Rhythm is Gonna Get You, 1-2-3, Morenita, Caridad, Con Los Años Que Me Quedan, Bésame, No Pretendo, School's Out, No Me Dejes de Querer, No Llores, Mi Tierra/Oye Mi Canto, Turn the Beat Around, Conga, I Just Wanna Be Happy) while every other concert had a set list of over 20 songs.
- In Marbella "Cuts Both Ways" was performed instead of "1-2-3."
- The same set list was made for the concerts at Rotterdam and Belfast, however a variation of songs was notable between the two concerts at the encore section. For the Rotterdam date the encore songs were "Live for Loving You," an a cappella version of the song "Remember Me with Love," "I See Your Smile," and "Caridad." For Belfast the encore consisted of "Live for Loving You," "Higher," "Always Tomorrow," and "Caridad."
- The same set list was made for all the concerts in Spain after the British date. However the encore sections were very different: In Madrid the encore consisted of "Live for Loving You," "Higher," an a cappella version of Mel Carter's "Hold Me, Thrill Me, Kiss Me," a cover of the Joselito song "El Ruiseñor," "Always Tomorrow," and "Caridad."
- In Barcelona the encore included "Live for Loving You," "Higher", "Can't Stay Away from You" and "Caridad." Before the encore section an a cappella version of "Show Me the Way Back to Your Heart" was performed.
- For the Tenerife concert the encore section was made of: "Live for Loving You," a cover of Joselito song "El Ruiseñor," her song "Higher," an a cappella version of "Remember Me With Love," "Caridad," and her duet "Santo Santo" was included in a cappella version sung with the public along with the song "Malvina."
- The Peru concert lasted for more than 3 hours. The encore consisted of "Live for Loving You," "Higher," "Corazón Prohibido," "You'll Be Mine (Party Time)", "1-2-3," "Si Señor!...," and Desde la Oscuridad." That night, "Hoy" was performed with Gian Marco, who wrote the song.
- The concert in Argentina ended with Carlos Gardel's Tango "El Día Que Me Quieras." The encore was "Live for Loving You," "Higher," "Si Señor!...," "Corazón Prohibido," "Más Allá," and "Desde La Oscuridad" with Gloria and the MSM playing for almost 3 hours.
- During the concert in Puerto Rico, Gloria was joined by Kany García for "Desde la Oscuridad."

== Ticket sales ==
The sales for the first date announced were sold via Live Nation at Thursday May 29, 2008, starting 5 pm until Friday May 30, 2008, ending at the same hour. The tickets for the concert at Marbella, Spain were exclusively sold, tickets for this concert were on sale on June 13, 2008, at www.ticktackticket.com, Tick Tack Ticket outlets, and the FNAC, Urende, Carrefour and Tipo stores and only 2,600 tickets were available.

The tickets for the concert at Santa Ponsa, Mallorca were also exclusive in the way of sales, tickets for residents of the city were cheaper than the tickets for tourists or travelers in the city.

The tickets for the first Uruguay concert at the Hotel Conrad were only issued to VIP Casino guests leading to the first show being completely sold out. The second date was an open sale and had the same success selling out everything. Tickets for the Lima concert reportedly sold out two weeks in advance.

== Tour dates ==
Date	City	Country	Venue
Europe
August 22, 2008	Valencia	Spain	El Antiguo Cauce Del Rio Tur
August 24, 2008	Marbella	Spain	Puente Romano Tennis Center
September 5, 2008	Rotterdam	Netherlands	Rotterdam Ahoy
September 8, 2008	Belfast	United Kingdom	Odyssey Arena
September 10, 2008	London	United Kingdom	Wembley Arena
September 12, 2008	Zaragoza	Spain	Expo 2008
September 13, 2008	Madrid	Spain	Madrid Arena
September 15, 2008	Santa Ponsa	Spain	El Molino Grounds
September 17, 2008	Barcelona	Spain	Palau Sant Jordi
September 19, 2008	Tenerife	Spain	CIAT
Americas
October 11, 2008	Oranjestad	Aruba	Aruba Entertainment Center
October 24, 2008	Hollywood	United States	Seminole Hard Rock Hotel and Casino Hollywood
January 17, 2009	Honolulu	United States	Neal S. Blaisdell Center
April 9, 2009	Punta del Este	Uruguay	Hotel Conrad
April 10, 2009	Punta del Este	Uruguay	Hotel Conrad
April 15, 2009	Santiago	Chile	Movistar Arena
April 18, 2009	Buenos Aires	Argentina	Estadio G.E.B.A.
April 21, 2009	Lima	Peru	Estadio Monumental
April 23, 2009	Guayaquil	Ecuador	Estadio Modelo Alberto Spencer Herrera
Europe 2009
July 16, 2009	Milan	Italy	Forum di Assago
July 17, 2009	Locarno	Switzerland	Piazza Grande
July 25, 2009	Gran Canaria	Spain	Estadio Gran Canaria
July 27, 2009	Liverpool	United Kingdom	Echo Arena Liverpool
August 3, 2009	Istanbul	Turkey	Kurucesme Arena
Americas
October 10, 2009	San Juan	Puerto Rico	Coliseo de Puerto Rico
October 15, 2009	Panama City	Panama	Figali Convention Center
October 25, 2009	Guadalajara	Mexico	Telmex Auditorium
October 30, 2009	Mexico City	Mexico	National Auditorium
November 1, 2009	Monterrey	Mexico	Monterrey Arena

== She's Got a Friend ==
As part of her tour schedule, Estefan gave a three-days special performance at the Foxwoods Resort Casino. But the difference this time, was that this performance was a concert with singer/songwriter Carole King.

Set

- Gloria:
1. "Oye!"
2. "Rhythm Is Gonna Get You"
3. "Tres Deseos"
4. "Wrapped"
5. "Coming Out of the Dark"
6. "Mi Tierra"/"Oye Mi Canto"
- Gloria & Carole:
1. "It's Too Late" (Featuring Emily Estefan on guitar)
2. "Lo Que Tu Eres Para Mí"
- Carole:
1. "Way Over Yonder"
2. "So Far Away"
3. "Jazzman"
- Gloria & Carole:
1. "(You Make Me Feel Like) A Natural Woman"
- Gloria:
1. "Everlasting Love"
2. "Cuba Libre"
3. "Get On Your Feet"
4. "Turn The Beat Around"
5. "Conga"
- Gloria & Carole:
1. "Anything For You"
2. "You've Got A Friend"
3. "I Feel The Earth Move"
- Encore: Gloria & Carole:
1. "Will You Love Me Tomorrow"

Date	City	Country	Venue
May 22, 2009	Ledyard	United States	Foxwoods Resort Casino
May 23, 2009	Ledyard	United States	Foxwoods Resort Casino
May 24, 2009	Ledyard	United States	Foxwoods Resort Casino

== Miscellaneous concerts ==
Date	City	Country	Venue
June 27, 2009	Guadalajara	Mexico	Jalisco en Vivo 2009
July 31, 2009	Monte Carlo	Monaco	Private Red Cross benefit
October 22, 2009	Las Vegas	United States	Vegas@50+AARP
