= Heaven's What I Feel =

"Heaven's What I Feel / Corazón Prohibido"
- Standard cover art; UK CD2 uses the same cover but a close up

Single by Gloria Estefan

from the album Gloria!
- B-side: "Gloria's Hitmix"
- Released: May 5, 1998
- Recorded: 1997–1998
- Genre: Dance-pop; house; dance
- Length: 5:05
- Label: Epic
- Songwriter: Kike Santander
- Producers: Emilio Estefan, Jr.; Kike Santander

Gloria Estefan singles chronology
"En El Jardín" (1997)	"Heaven's What I Feel / Corazón Prohibido" (1998)	"Oye" (1998)

Music video
- "Heaven's What I Feel" on YouTube

"Heaven's What I Feel" is a song recorded by the Cuban-American singer-songwriter Gloria Estefan for her eighth studio album Gloria! (1998). The track's lyrics were written by famed Colombian songwriter Kike Santander, who also produced the track with Gloria's husband and longtime collaborator Emilio Estefan. The up-tempo dance-pop, house, and dance number was originally meant for Canadian singer Celine Dion. Estefan's label, Epic Records, released it on April 14, 1998, to US contemporary hit radio stations as the lead single for Gloria!. A Spanish version of the song, "Corazón Prohibido", was also recorded and released.

Marked as a comeback single for the singer, "Heaven's What I Feel" became a success across many different record charts. The track cracked the top ten in Hungary and Japan's Tokio Hot 100 chart, top twenty in the United Kingdom, and top forty in Belgium, Switzerland, and the United States, where in the lattermost country became her highest-charting single since 1991's "Live for Loving You". The track's Spanish version also topped the Spanish and US Billboard Latin Pop Airplay charts. Estefan performed the track at many different shows and TV concerts such as the 1998 VH1 Divas Live, Top of the Pops, and the 1998 World Music Awards. "Heaven's What I Feel" was nominated for a Grammy Award for Best Dance Recording in 1999, with its Bille Woodruff-directed music video receiving an ALMA Award for Best Outstanding Video.

== Background and promotion ==
The song was written by Colombian-American composer Kike Santander. It was first recorded by Canadian singer Celine Dion, but she did not feel it was right for her fifth English album Let's Talk About Love (1997), so the song was given to Estefan. Santander co-produced it with Estefan's husband, Emilio Estefan Jr. It was recorded in three languages: English, Spanish and French and was made available on May 5, 1998, by Epic Records. The Spanish version titled "Corazón Prohibido" ("Forbidden Heart") was released as a single in Spain, where it topped the charts. The French version titled "Amour Infini" ("Endless Love") was only available on the Canadian and the French album releases, and on the European Limited Edition 2-Disc release of the gloria! album.

The single received massive promotion. Estefan first performed the song at the 1998 VH1 Divas Live; she also performed at Studio 54 in New York City. Then she sang it again at the 1998 World Music Awards in Monaco where she was the hostess of the event. It was performed on many television programs around the world, such as the British music chart television program Top of the Pops. The B-side of the single is the "Gloria Hitmix", a megamix which includes the songs: "I'm Not Giving You Up", "Reach", "You'll Be Mine (Party Time)", "Mi Tierra", "Live for Loving You", "Tres Deseos", "Everlasting Love" and "Turn the Beat Around." On June 3, 2022, Estefan released the "Heaven's What I Feel" EP and its Spanish version "Corazón Prohibido" EP to all digital and streaming outlets.

== Critical reception ==
Ben Wener from Beaver County Times noted "the lush orchestration" of the song in his review of gloria!. Larry Flick from Billboard described it as a "deliciously sweet confection that takes the listener back to the days of disco with its wonderfully vibrant strings and rumbling percussion." He added, "La G is in exceptional voice here, hitting high notes she's never touched before—and doing so with a delightfully romantic flair. The fingerprints of top clubland producer Tony Moran are all over the track, starting with its muscular bassline and unabashedly gleeful keyboards." He also noted that the song has "cute lyrics and instantly sing-along chorus." Another editor, Chuck Taylor deemed it as a "tasty" track. The Daily Vault's Alfredo Narvaez called it a "flamboyant" song, and stated that it is "pretty enough to be liked by teenage girls and danceable enough that older ladies will instantly recognize and like its vibe."

Dave Sholin from the Gavin Report viewed it as "upbeat with a great hook" and a "winner". He added that "while some of her strongest hits have been ballads, it's wonderful to hear her pick up the pace on this latest endeavor." Joey Guerra from Houston Chronicle wrote that it is a "daring, delightful track" that "takes flight on the wings of its rousing chorus and themes of unexpected love." Jeremy Griffin from The Ithacan described it as "sensational". A reviewer from Music & Media commented that with this track, Estefan "yet again comes up with a near-perfect pop/dance crossover hit. The song has the hook to make it a radio favourite, and a couple of snappy remixes should help broaden its appeal." Gerald Martinez from New Sunday Times wrote that it "grooves to a latin disco beat of the 70s and 80s". Victoria Segal from NME said songs like "Heaven's What I Feel" "speak the international language of tedium". Larry Flick for Vibe noted its "twinkly synths, romantic live strings, and vibrant house bass line".

== Music video ==
The music video was directed by American film director Bille Woodruff. It was filmed in a "space" style and shows Gloria flying in some scenes. The video begins with Gloria standing alone singing in front of a magical green portal. As the chorus begins, she goes through it and ends up flying along a rotating tunnel with flashing lights. As the second verse begins, Gloria ends up in a club, amidst dancing people in several floors. Along the walls are screens with Estefan singing. She also performs choreography with some of the dancers. Towards the end, she is lifted up as she continues to sing. After she sings the last note of the song, everyone in the club claps for her. The video received the ALMA Award for "Best Outstanding Video". Two similar videos were created, one for the English version and one for the Spanish version.

== Usage in media ==
The song was included in the movie Dance with Me (starring Vanessa L. Williams and Chayanne) soundtrack.

== Charts ==
=== Weekly charts ===
Weekly chart performance for "Heaven's What I Feel"
Chart (1998)	Peak position
Australia (ARIA)	105
Belgium (Ultratop 50 Flanders)	30
Europe (Eurochart Hot 100)	34
European Radio (Music & Media) '"Heaven's What I Feel/Corazón Prohibito"'	13
Germany (GfK)	85
Hungary (Mahasz)	3
Hungary Airplay (Music & Media)	8
Italy Airplay (Music & Media)	3
Japan (Oricon)	16
Japan (Tokio Hot 100)	3
Netherlands (Dutch Top 40 Tipparade)	11
Netherlands (Single Top 100)	69
Poland Airplay (Music & Media)	1
Scottish Singles Sales (Official Charts)	16
Switzerland (Schweizer Hitparade)	38
Spain (AFYVE) "Corazón Prohibito"	1
Spain Airplay (Music & Media) "Corazón Prohibito"	1
UK Singles (Official Charts)	17
UK Airplay (Music Control)	58
US Billboard Hot 100	27
US Adult Contemporary (Billboard)	4
US Dance Club Songs (Billboard)	7
US Dance Singles Sales (Billboard)	6
US Hot Latin Songs (Billboard) '"Corazón Prohibito"'	2
US Latin Pop Airplay (Billboard) '"Corazón Prohibito"'	1
US Tropical Airplay (Billboard) '"Corazón Prohibito"'	8
US Adult Contemporary (Gavin Report)	8
US Adult Contemporary (Radio & Records)	9
US CHR/Pop (Radio & Records)	45

=== Year-end charts ===
Year-end chart performance for "Heaven's What I Feel"
Chart (1998)	Position
Japan (Tokio Hot 100)	21
US Hot Adult Contemporary Singles & Tracks (Billboard)	23
US Hot Dance Maxi-Singles Sales (Billboard)	27
US Adult Contemporary (Gavin Report)	31
US Adult Contemporary (Radio & Records)	27

== Formats and track listings ==
=== "Heaven's What I Feel" ===
US CD Single (34K 78875) [May 5, 1998]
No.	Title	Writer(s)	Length
1.	"Heaven's What I Feel" (Radio Edit)	Kike Santander	4:37
2.	"Heaven's What I Feel" (Love To Infinity's Classic Radio Mix)	Kike Santander	5:01
3.	"Heaven's What I Feel" (Victor Calderone Radio Mix)	Kike Santander	4:00
4.	"Gloria's Hitmix (Edit)" (I'm Not Giving You Up / You'll Be Mine (Party Time) / Mi Tierra / Live For Loving You / Tres Deseos / Everlasting Love / Turn the Beat Around)	Gloria Estefan, Kike Santander, Emilio Estefan Jr., Lawrence Dermer, Clay Ostwald, Estefano, Diane Warren, Buzz Cason, Mac Gayden, Peter Jackson, Gerald Jackson	5:01

US CD-Maxi Single (49K 78908) [May 5, 1998]
No.	Title	Writer(s)	Length
1.	"Heaven's What I Feel" (Radio Edit)	Kike Santander	4:37
2.	"Heaven's What I Feel" (Love To Infinity's Classic Radio Mix)	Kike Santander	5:01
3.	"Heaven's What I Feel" (Victor Calderone Radio Mix)	Kike Santander	4:00
4.	"Heaven's What I Feel" (Soul Solution Radio Mix)	Kike Santander	4:00
5.	"Heaven's What I Feel" (Victor Calderone Mix)	Kike Santander	8:32
6.	"Heaven's What I Feel" (Soul Solution Vox Mix)	Kike Santander	9:30
7.	"Heaven's What I Feel" (Trouser Enthusiasts Neanderthal Thrust Mix)	Kike Santander	10:54
8.	"Gloria's Hitmix" (I'm Not Giving You Up / Reach / You'll Be Mine (Party Time) / Mi Tierra / Live For Loving You / Tres Deseos / Everlasting Love / Turn the Beat Around)	Gloria Estefan, Kike Santander, Emilio Estefan Jr., Lawrence Dermer, Clay Ostwald, Estefano, Diane Warren, Buzz Cason, Mac Gayden, Peter Jackson, Gerald Jackson	10:31

US Cassette Single (34T 78875) [May 5, 1998]
No.	Title	Writer(s)	Length
1.	"Heaven's What I Feel" (Radio Edit)	Kike Santander	4:37
2.	"Corazón Prohibido (Radio Edit)" (Heaven's What I Feel - Spanish Version)	Gloria Estefan, Kike Santander	5:01
3.	"Gloria's Hitmix (Edit)" (I'm Not Giving You Up / You'll Be Mine (Party Time) / Mi Tierra / Live For Loving You / Tres Deseos / Everlasting Love / Turn the Beat Around)	Gloria Estefan, Kike Santander, Emilio Estefan Jr., Lawrence Dermer, Clay Ostwald, Estefano, Diane Warren, Buzz Cason, Mac Gayden, Peter Jackson, Gerald Jackson	5:01

US 7" Vinyl Single (34 78875) [May 5, 1998]
No.	Title	Writer(s)	Length
1.	"Heaven's What I Feel" (Radio Edit)	Kike Santander	4:37
2.	"Gloria's Hitmix (Edit)" (I'm Not Giving You Up / You'll Be Mine (Party Time) / Mi Tierra / Live For Loving You / Tres Deseos / Everlasting Love / Turn the Beat Around)	Gloria Estefan, Kike Santander, Emilio Estefan Jr., Lawrence Dermer, Clay Ostwald, Estefano, Diane Warren, Buzz Cason, Mac Gayden, Peter Jackson, Gerald Jackson	5:01

US 12" Vinyl Single #1 (49 78908) [May 5, 1998]
No.	Title	Writer(s)	Length
1.	"Heaven's What I Feel" (Victor Calderone Mix)	Kike Santander	8:32
2.	"Heaven's What I Feel" (Love To Infinity's Classic Paradise Mix)	Kike Santander	6:10
3.	"Heaven's What I Feel" (Trouser Enthusiasts Neanderthal Thrust Mix)	Kike Santander	10:54
4.	"Heaven's What I Feel" (Prince Quick Mix's Amped Up Pass)	Kike Santander	6:00

US 12" Vinyl Single #2 (49 78926) [May 26, 1998]
No.	Title	Writer(s)	Length
1.	"Heaven's What I Feel" (Soul Solution Vox Mix)	Kike Santander	9:30
2.	"Corazón Prohibido" (Pablo Flores Spanish 12" Remix)	Gloria Estefan, Kike Santander	7:10
3.	"Heaven's What I Feel" (Prince Quick Mix's Subaquatic Dub)	Kike Santander	6:20
4.	"Gloria's Hitmix" (I'm Not Giving You Up / Reach / You'll Be Mine (Party Time) / Mi Tierra / Live For Loving You / Tres Deseos / Everlasting Love / Turn the Beat Around)	Gloria Estefan, Kike Santander, Emilio Estefan Jr., Lawrence Dermer, Clay Ostwald, Estefano, Diane Warren, Buzz Cason, Mac Gayden, Peter Jackson, Gerald Jackson	10:06

US Promo CD Single (ESK 41059) [April 1998]
No.	Title	Writer(s)	Length
1.	"Heaven's What I Feel" (Radio Edit)	Kike Santander	4:37

US Promo 12" Vinyl Single #1 (EAS 41059) [May 1998]
No.	Title	Writer(s)	Length
1.	"Heaven's What I Feel" (Victor Calderone Mix)	Kike Santander	8:32
2.	"Heaven's What I Feel" (Love To Infinity's Classic Paradise Mix)	Kike Santander	6:10
3.	"Heaven's What I Feel" (Trouser Enthusiasts Neanderthal Thrust Mix)	Kike Santander	10:54
4.	"Heaven's What I Feel" (Soul Solution NRG Dub)	Kike Santander	5:00

US Promo 12" Vinyl Single #2 (EAS 41179) [May 1998]
No.	Title	Writer(s)	Length
1.	"Heaven's What I Feel" (Soul Solution Vox Mix)	Kike Santander	10:06
2.	"Heaven's What I Feel" (Victor Calderone Dub)	Kike Santander	7:00
3.	"Heaven's What I Feel" (Love To Infinity Rhino Mix)	Kike Santander	7:11
4.	"Corazón Prohibido" (Pablo Flores Spanish 12" Remix)	Gloria Estefan, Kike Santander	7:10

US Promo 12" Vinyl Single #3 (No Cat #) [May 1998]
No.	Title	Writer(s)	Length
1.	"Heaven's What I Feel" (Prince Quick Mix's Amped Up Pass)	Kike Santander	6:00
2.	"Heaven's What I Feel" (Prince Quick Mix's Subaquatic Dub)	Kike Santander	6:20

Europe CD Single (EPC 665750 1) [May 18, 1998]
No.	Title	Writer(s)	Length
1.	"Heaven's What I Feel" (Radio Edit)	Kike Santander	4:37
2.	"Gloria's Hitmix (Edit)" (I'm Not Giving You Up / You'll Be Mine (Party Time) / Mi Tierra / Live For Loving You / Tres Deseos / Everlasting Love / Turn the Beat Around)	Gloria Estefan, Kike Santander, Emilio Estefan Jr., Lawrence Dermer, Clay Ostwald, Estefano, Diane Warren, Buzz Cason, Mac Gayden, Peter Jackson, Gerald Jackson	5:01

Europe CD-Maxi Single #1 (EPC 665750 2) [May 18, 1998]
No.	Title	Writer(s)	Length
1.	"Heaven's What I Feel" (Radio Edit)	Kike Santander	4:37
2.	"Heaven's What I Feel" (Love To Infinity's Classic Radio Mix (Short Version))	Kike Santander	4:22
3.	"Heaven's What I Feel" (Victor Calderone Radio Mix)	Kike Santander	4:00
4.	"Gloria's Hitmix" (I'm Not Giving You Up / Reach / You'll Be Mine (Party Time) / Mi Tierra / Live For Loving You / Tres Deseos / Everlasting Love / Turn the Beat Around)	Gloria Estefan, Kike Santander, Emilio Estefan Jr., Lawrence Dermer, Clay Ostwald, Estefano, Diane Warren, Buzz Cason, Mac Gayden, Peter Jackson, Gerald Jackson	10:31

Europe CD-Maxi Single #2 ("The Remixes") [EPC 665750 5] {May 18, 1998}
No.	Title	Writer(s)	Length
1.	"Heaven's What I Feel" (Love To Infinity's Classic Paradise Mix)	Kike Santander	6:10
2.	"Heaven's What I Feel" (Victor Calderone Mix)	Kike Santander	8:32
3.	"Corazón Prohibido" (Pablo Flores Spanish 12" Remix)	Gloria Estefan, Kike Santander	7:10
4.	"Heaven's What I Feel" (Trouser Enthusiasts Neanderthal Thrust Mix)	Kike Santander	10:54
5.	"Heaven's What I Feel" (Soul Solution Vox Mix)	Kike Santander	10:06

Europe 12" Vinyl Single (EPC 665750 6) [May 18, 1998]
No.	Title	Writer(s)	Length
1.	"Heaven's What I Feel" (Love To Infinity's Classic Paradise Mix)	Kike Santander	6:10
2.	"Heaven's What I Feel" (Soul Solution Vox Mix)	Kike Santander	10:06
3.	"Corazón Prohibido" (Pablo Flores Spanish 12" Remix)	Gloria Estefan, Kike Santander	7:10
4.	"Heaven's What I Feel" (Trouser Enthusiasts Neanderthal Thrust Mix)	Kike Santander	10:54
5.	"Gloria's Hitmix" (I'm Not Giving You Up / Reach / You'll Be Mine (Party Time) / Mi Tierra / Live For Loving You / Tres Deseos / Everlasting Love / Turn the Beat Around)	Gloria Estefan, Kike Santander, Emilio Estefan Jr., Lawrence Dermer, Clay Ostwald, Estefano, Diane Warren, Buzz Cason, Mac Gayden, Peter Jackson, Gerald Jackson	10:31

Europe Promo CD Single (SAMPCS 5103) [May 1998]
No.	Title	Writer(s)	Length
1.	"Heaven's What I Feel" (Radio Edit)	Kike Santander	4:37

UK CD-Maxi Single #1 (666004 2) [May 25, 1998]
No.	Title	Writer(s)	Length
1.	"Heaven's What I Feel" (Radio Edit)	Kike Santander	4:37
2.	"Heaven's What I Feel" (Love To Infinity's Classic Radio Mix)	Kike Santander	5:01
3.	"Heaven's What I Feel" (Victor Calderone Radio Mix)	Kike Santander	4:00
4.	"Gloria's Hitmix (Edit)" (I'm Not Giving You Up / You'll Be Mine (Party Time) / Mi Tierra / Live For Loving You / Tres Deseos / Everlasting Love / Turn the Beat Around)	Gloria Estefan, Kike Santander, Emilio Estefan Jr., Lawrence Dermer, Clay Ostwald, Estefano, Diane Warren, Buzz Cason, Mac Gayden, Peter Jackson, Gerald Jackson	5:01

UK CD-Maxi Single #2 (666004 5) [May 25, 1998]
No.	Title	Writer(s)	Length
1.	"Heaven's What I Feel" (Trouser Enthusiasts Neanderthal Thrust Mix)	Kike Santander	10:54
2.	"Heaven's What I Feel" (Love To Infinity's Classic Paradise Mix)	Kike Santander	6:10
3.	"Heaven's What I Feel" (Victor Calderone Mix)	Kike Santander	8:32
4.	"Heaven's What I Feel" (Soul Solution Vox Mix)	Kike Santander	10:06

UK Cassette Single (666004 4) [May 25, 1998]
No.	Title	Writer(s)	Length
1.	"Heaven's What I Feel" (Radio Edit)	Kike Santander	4:37
2.	"Gloria's Hitmix (Edit)" (I'm Not Giving You Up / You'll Be Mine (Party Time) / Mi Tierra / Live For Loving You / Tres Deseos / Everlasting Love / Turn the Beat Around)	Gloria Estefan, Kike Santander, Emilio Estefan Jr., Lawrence Dermer, Clay Ostwald, Estefano, Diane Warren, Buzz Cason, Mac Gayden, Peter Jackson, Gerald Jackson	5:01

UK Promo CD Single #1 (XPCD 2254) [May 1998]
No.	Title	Writer(s)	Length
1.	"Heaven's What I Feel" (Radio Edit)	Kike Santander	4:37

UK Promo CD Single #2 (The Remixes) [XPCD 2261] {May 1998}
No.	Title	Writer(s)	Length
1.	"Heaven's What I Feel" (Love To Infinity's Classic Radio Mix)	Kike Santander	5:01
2.	"Heaven's What I Feel" (Victor Calderone Radio Mix)	Kike Santander	4:12
3.	"Heaven's What I Feel" (Soul Solution Radio Mix)	Kike Santander	4:00
4.	"Gloria's Hitmix (Edit)" (I'm Not Giving You Up / You'll Be Mine (Party Time) / Mi Tierra / Live For Loving You / Tres Deseos / Everlasting Love / Turn the Beat Around)	Gloria Estefan, Kike Santander, Emilio Estefan Jr., Lawrence Dermer, Clay Ostwald, Estefano, Diane Warren, Buzz Cason, Mac Gayden, Peter Jackson, Gerald Jackson	5:01

UK Promo 12" Vinyl Single #1 (XPR 3221) [May 1998]
No.	Title	Writer(s)	Length
1.	"Heaven's What I Feel" (Love To Infinity's Classic Paradise Mix)	Kike Santander	6:10
2.	"Heaven's What I Feel" (Soul Solution Vox Mix)	Kike Santander	10:06

UK Promo 12" Vinyl Single #2 (XPR 3234) [May 1998]
No.	Title	Writer(s)	Length
1.	"Heaven's What I Feel" (Trouser Enthusiasts Neanderthal Thrust Mix)	Kike Santander	10:54
2.	"Heaven's What I Feel" (Victor Calderone Mix)	Kike Santander	8:32

Mexico CD-Maxi Single (CDMIX 658684) [May 1998]
No.	Title	Writer(s)	Length
1.	"Heaven's What I Feel" (Radio Edit)	Kike Santander	4:37
2.	"Heaven's What I Feel" (Love To Infinity's Classic Radio Mix (Short Version))	Kike Santander	4:22
3.	"Heaven's What I Feel" (Victor Calderone Radio Mix)	Kike Santander	4:00
4.	"Gloria's Hitmix" (I'm Not Giving You Up / Reach / You'll Be Mine (Party Time) / Mi Tierra / Live For Loving You / Tres Deseos / Everlasting Love / Turn the Beat Around)	Gloria Estefan, Kike Santander, Emilio Estefan Jr., Lawrence Dermer, Clay Ostwald, Estefano, Diane Warren, Buzz Cason, Mac Gayden, Peter Jackson, Gerald Jackson	10:31

Mexico Promo CD Single (PRCD 97288) [May 1998]
No.	Title	Writer(s)	Length
1.	"Heaven's What I Feel" (Radio Edit)	Kike Santander	4:37

South Africa CD-Maxi Single (CDSIN 264 I) [May 1998]
No.	Title	Writer(s)	Length
1.	"Heaven's What I Feel" (Radio Edit)	Kike Santander	4:37
2.	"Heaven's What I Feel" (Love To Infinity's Classic Radio Mix (Short Version))	Kike Santander	4:22
3.	"Heaven's What I Feel" (Victor Calderone Radio Mix)	Kike Santander	4:00
4.	"Gloria's Hitmix" (I'm Not Giving You Up / Reach / You'll Be Mine (Party Time) / Mi Tierra / Live For Loving You / Tres Deseos / Everlasting Love / Turn the Beat Around)	Gloria Estefan, Kike Santander, Emilio Estefan Jr., Lawrence Dermer, Clay Ostwald, Estefano, Diane Warren, Buzz Cason, Mac Gayden, Peter Jackson, Gerald Jackson	10:31

Australia CD-Maxi Single (665741 2) [May 1998]
No.	Title	Writer(s)	Length
1.	"Heaven's What I Feel" (Radio Edit / a.k.a. Radio Edit #2)	Kike Santander	4:07
2.	"Heaven's What I Feel" (Classic Radio Short / a.k.a. Love To Infinity's Classic Radio Mix (Short Version))	Kike Santander	3:26
3.	"Heaven's What I Feel" (Classic Radio Long / a.k.a. Love To Infinity's Classic Radio Mix)	Kike Santander	5:05
4.	"Heaven's What I Feel" (Love To Infinity Rhino Mix)	Kike Santander	7:11
5.	"Heaven's What I Feel" (Soul Solution Vox Mix)	Kike Santander	10:09
6.	"Corazón Prohibido" (Pablo Flores Spanish 12" Remix)	Gloria Estefan, Kike Santander	7:04

Australia Promo CD Single (SAMP 1071) [May 1998]
No.	Title	Writer(s)	Length
1.	"Heaven's What I Feel" (Radio Edit / a.k.a. Radio Edit #2)	Kike Santander	4:07
2.	"Heaven's What I Feel" (Classic Radio Short / a.k.a. Love To Infinity's Classic Radio Mix (Short Version))	Kike Santander	3:26
3.	"Heaven's What I Feel" (Classic Radio Long / a.k.a. Love To Infinity's Classic Radio Mix)	Kike Santander	5:05
4.	"Heaven's What I Feel" (Love To Infinity Rhino Mix)	Kike Santander	7:11
5.	"Heaven's What I Feel" (Soul Solution Vox Mix)	Kike Santander	10:09
6.	"Corazón Prohibido" (Pablo Flores Spanish 12" Remix)	Gloria Estefan, Kike Santander	7:04

Japan CD-Maxi Single (ESCA 6942) [May 27, 1998]
No.	Title	Writer(s)	Length
1.	"Heaven's What I Feel" (Radio Edit)	Kike Santander	4:37
2.	"Heaven's What I Feel" (Love To Infinity's Classic Radio Mix)	Kike Santander	5:01
3.	"Heaven's What I Feel" (Victor Calderone Radio Mix)	Kike Santander	4:00
4.	"Heaven's What I Feel" (Soul Solution Radio Mix)	Kike Santander	4:00
5.	"Heaven's What I Feel" (Victor Calderone Mix)	Kike Santander	8:32
6.	"Heaven's What I Feel" (Soul Solution Vox Mix)	Kike Santander	9:30
7.	"Heaven's What I Feel" (Trouser Enthusiasts Neanderthal Thrust Mix)	Kike Santander	10:54
8.	"Gloria's Hitmix" (I'm Not Giving You Up / Reach / You'll Be Mine (Party Time) / Mi Tierra / Live For Loving You / Tres Deseos / Everlasting Love / Turn the Beat Around)	Gloria Estefan, Kike Santander, Emilio Estefan Jr., Lawrence Dermer, Clay Ostwald, Estefano, Diane Warren, Buzz Cason, Mac Gayden, Peter Jackson, Gerald Jackson	10:31

=== "Corazón Prohibido" ===
US Promo CD Single (ESK 41091) [April 1998]
No.	Title	Writer(s)	Length
1.	"Corazón Prohibido" (Radio Edit)	Gloria Estefan, Kike Santander	4:35
2.	"Corazón Prohibido" (Pablo Flores Remix)	Gloria Estefan, Kike Santander	4:41

Spain CD-Maxi Single (EPC 665896 2) [May 1998]
No.	Title	Writer(s)	Length
1.	"Corazón Prohibido" (Pablo Flores Spanish 12" Remix)	Gloria Estefan, Kike Santander	7:10
2.	"Heaven's What I Feel" (Victor Calderone Mix)	Kike Santander	8:32
3.	"Heaven's What I Feel" (Love To Infinity's Classic Paradise Mix)	Kike Santander	6:10
4.	"Gloria's Hitmix" (I'm Not Giving You Up / Reach / You'll Be Mine (Party Time) / Mi Tierra / Live For Loving You / Tres Deseos / Everlasting Love / Turn the Beat Around)	Gloria Estefan, Kike Santander, Emilio Estefan Jr., Lawrence Dermer, Clay Ostwald, Estefano, Diane Warren, Buzz Cason, Mac Gayden, Peter Jackson, Gerald Jackson	10:31

Spain 12" Vinyl Single (Heaven's What I Feel / Corazón Prohibido) [EPC 665896 6] {May 1998}
No.	Title	Writer(s)	Length
1.	"Heaven's What I Feel" (Radio Edit)	Gloria Estefan, Kike Santander	4:37
2.	"Heaven's What I Feel" (Victor Calderone Mix)	Kike Santander	8:32
3.	"Heaven's What I Feel" (Love To Infinity's Classic Paradise Mix)	Kike Santander	6:10
4.	"Corazón Prohibido" (Radio Edit)	Gloria Estefan, Kike Santander	4:35
5.	"Corazón Prohibido" (Pablo Flores Spanish 12" Remix)	Gloria Estefan, Kike Santander	7:10
6.	"Gloria's Hitmix" (I'm Not Giving You Up / Reach / You'll Be Mine (Party Time) / Mi Tierra / Live For Loving You / Tres Deseos / Everlasting Love / Turn the Beat Around)	Gloria Estefan, Kike Santander, Emilio Estefan Jr., Lawrence Dermer, Clay Ostwald, Estefano, Diane Warren, Buzz Cason, Mac Gayden, Peter Jackson, Gerald Jackson	10:38

Spain Promo CD Single (SAMPCS 5170) [May 1998]
No.	Title	Writer(s)	Length
1.	"Corazón Prohibido" (Radio Edit)	Gloria Estefan, Kike Santander	4:35
2.	"Corazón Prohibido" (Pablo Flores Remix)	Gloria Estefan, Kike Santander	4:41
3.	"Heaven's What I Feel" (Radio Edit)	Kike Santander	4:35

Mexico Promo CD Single (PRCD 97279) [May 1998]
No.	Title	Writer(s)	Length
1.	"Corazón Prohibido" (Radio Edit)	Gloria Estefan, Kike Santander	4:35
2.	"Corazón Prohibido" (Pablo Flores Remix)	Gloria Estefan, Kike Santander	4:41

Argentina Promo CD Single (2-000391) [May 1998]
No.	Title	Writer(s)	Length
1.	"Corazón Prohibido" (Radio Edit)	Gloria Estefan, Kike Santander	4:35

== Release history ==
Release dates and format(s) for "Heaven's What I Feel"
Region	Date	Format(s)	Label(s)	Ref.
United States	April 14, 1998	Contemporary hit radio	Epic	
United States	April 15, 1998	Adult contemporary; rhythm-crossover radio	Epic	
United States	May 5, 1998	CD; cassette; 12-inch single	Epic	
United Kingdom	May 25, 1998	CD; cassette single	Epic	

== Official versions and remixes ==
Original versions

1. Album Version — (5:05)
2. Radio Edit #1 — (4:37)
3. Radio Edit #2 — (4:07)
4. Ballad Version — (4:28)
5. Acappella — (4:26)
6. Spanish Version ("Corazón Prohibido") — (5:05)
7. Spanish Radio Edit ("Corazón Prohibido") — (4:34)
8. Spanish Ballad Version ("Corazón Prohibido") — (5:05)
9. Spanish Acappella ("Corazón Prohibido") — (4:31)
10. French Version ("Amour Infini") — (5:05)

"Heaven's What I Feel" remixes

1. Pablo Flores Remix — (5:03)
2. Love To Infinity Classic Paradise Mix — (6:10)
3. Love To Infinity Classic Radio Mix #1 (a.k.a. Classic Radio Long) — (5:05)
4. Love To Infinity Classic Radio Edit #2 (a.k.a. Classic Radio Short) — (3:32)
5. Love To Infinity Rhino Mix — (7:11)
6. Victor Calderone Mix — (8:32)
7. Victor Calderone Radio Mix — (4:12)
8. Victor Calderone Dub — (7:30)
9. Soul Solution Vox Mix — (10:11)
10. Soul Solution Radio Mix — (4:40)
11. Soul Solution NRG Dub — (5:12)
12. Trouser Enthusiasts' Neanderthal Thrust Mix — (10:54)
13. Prince Quick Mix's Amped Up Pass — (5:40)
14. Prince Quick Mix's Subaquatic Dub — (6:15)

"Corazón Prohibido" remixes

1. Pablo Flores Remix — (4:42)
2. Pablo Flores Spanish 12" Remix — (7:10)
