= Oye (Gloria Estefan song) =

Single by Gloria Estefan

from the album Gloria!
- Released: July 27, 1998
- Genre: Latin; salsa; dance-pop
- Length: 4:40
- Label: Epic
- Songwriters: Gloria Estefan; Emilio Estefan, Jr.; Randall Barlow; Angie Chirino
- Producers: Emilio Estefan, Jr.; Tony Moran; Randall Barlow

Gloria Estefan singles chronology
"Heaven's What I Feel / Corazón Prohibido" (1998)	"Oye" (1998)	"Cuba Libre" (1998)

Music video
- "Oye" on YouTube

"Oye" (lit. Listen or Hey) is a song by Cuban American singer and songwriter Gloria Estefan. It was released by Epic on July 27, 1998 as the second single from her eighth studio album, Gloria! (1998). The song was written by Estefan, her husband Emilio Estefan, Jr., Randall Barlow and Angie Chirino and produced by Estefan, Jr., Barlow and Tony Moran. The single reached number one on the US Billboard Hot Dance Music/Club Play chart and in Spain. It earned the Billboard Latin Music Award for Best Latin Club-Dance Track of the Year.

On June 3, 2022, Estefan released the "Oye" English EP and its Spanish EP to all digital and streaming outlets.

== Critical reception ==
J.D. Considine from The Baltimore Sun felt that "Oye" is "where latin meets disco most effectively." He added, "Basically a sort of techno-salsa fusion, it combines the thumping regularity of electronics with the soulful release of Afro-Cuban rhythm, a combination so potent it makes dancing an almost involuntary response." Also Ben Wener from Beaver County Times noted the "bouncing Afro-Cuban flourishes" of the song.

Larry Flick from Billboard remarked that the second single from "La Glo's slammin' dance opus", gloria!, "sidesteps the disco demeanor of the previous "Heaven's What I Feel" in favor of a percussive salsa flavor." He added, "Once again, the veteran singer manages to surprise and delight, delivering a bilingual performance that is fraught with smoldering sensuality. She is bolstered by an arrangement that teeters between current club sounds and the shoulder-shakin' tone of her Miami Sound Machine breakthrough, "Conga". In fact, if you've been pining away for a jam that captures the party vibe of that classic recording, look no further."

Joey Guerra from Houston Chronicle stated that it has one of the album's "strongest punches", describing it as a "sweltering bilingual cut that recalls" Puerto Rican singer Ricky Martin's international smash "Maria". Victoria Segal from NME said that songs like "Oye" "speak the international language of tedium". Flick for Vibe noted that the song has a "ferocious new energy and a vocal spark that Estefan hasn't previously displayed."

== Music video ==
The accompanying music video for "Oye" was directed by Argentinian director Gustavo Garzón and features Estefan performing the song in a nightclub.

== Formats and track listings ==
US 12" vinyl single (49 79030) [July 14, 1998] {Cancelled/Unreleased}
No.	Title	Writer(s)	Length
1.	"Oye" (Rosabel's Cubarican Club Mix)	Gloria Estefan, Emilio Estefan, Jr., Randall Barlow, Angie Chirino	9:55
2.	"Oye" (Chris the Greek's Caliente Mix)	Gloria Estefan, Emilio Estefan, Jr., Randall Barlow, Angie Chirino	5:11
3.	"Oye" (Rosabel's Data-Flash Dub)	Gloria Estefan, Emilio Estefan, Jr., Randall Barlow, Angie Chirino	8:11
4.	"Oye" (Hex Hector Dub)	Gloria Estefan, Emilio Estefan, Jr., Randall Barlow, Angie Chirino	7:26

US promo CD single #1 (ESK 41373) [August 1998]
No.	Title	Writer(s)	Length
1.	"Oye" (Radio Edit)	Gloria Estefan, Emilio Estefan, Jr., Randall Barlow, Angie Chirino	4:18
2.	"Oye" (Album Version)	Gloria Estefan, Emilio Estefan, Jr., Randall Barlow, Angie Chirino	4:40
3.	"Oye" (TM's Radio Edit)	Gloria Estefan, Emilio Estefan, Jr., Randall Barlow, Angie Chirino	4:17
4.	"Oye" (Rosabel's Cubarican Radio Edit)	Gloria Estefan, Emilio Estefan, Jr., Randall Barlow, Angie Chirino	3:51
5.	"Oye" (Mijangos Radio Edit)	Gloria Estefan, Emilio Estefan, Jr., Randall Barlow, Angie Chirino	4:00

US promo CD single #2 (ESK 41428) [August 1998]
No.	Title	Writer(s)	Length
1.	"Oye" (Rosabel's Cubarican Club Mix)	Gloria Estefan, Emilio Estefan, Jr., Randall Barlow, Angie Chirino	9:55
2.	"Oye" (Hex Hector 12" Mix)	Gloria Estefan, Emilio Estefan, Jr., Randall Barlow, Angie Chirino	8:00
3.	"Oye" (Rosabel's Data-Flash Dub)	Gloria Estefan, Emilio Estefan, Jr., Randall Barlow, Angie Chirino	8:11
4.	"Oye" (DJ Greek Caliente Mix)	Gloria Estefan, Emilio Estefan, Jr., Randall Barlow, Angie Chirino	5:10
5.	"Oye" (Pablo Flores 12" Mix)	Gloria Estefan, Emilio Estefan, Jr., Randall Barlow, Angie Chirino	8:24
6.	"Oye" (Mijangos Latin Mix)	Gloria Estefan, Emilio Estefan, Jr., Randall Barlow, Angie Chirino	9:41
7.	"Oye" (Hex Hector Dub)	Gloria Estefan, Emilio Estefan, Jr., Randall Barlow, Angie Chirino	7:30

US promo 12" vinyl single #1 (EAS 41373) [August 1998]
No.	Title	Writer(s)	Length
1.	"Oye" (Hex Hector 12" Mix)	Gloria Estefan, Emilio Estefan, Jr., Randall Barlow, Angie Chirino	8:00
2.	"Oye" (DJ Greek's Dark Club Mix)	Gloria Estefan, Emilio Estefan, Jr., Randall Barlow, Angie Chirino	6:26
3.	"Oye" (Hex Hector Dub)	Gloria Estefan, Emilio Estefan, Jr., Randall Barlow, Angie Chirino	7:30
4.	"Oye" (DJ Greek Caliente Mix)	Gloria Estefan, Emilio Estefan, Jr., Randall Barlow, Angie Chirino	5:10

US promo 12" vinyl single #2 (EAS 41403) [August 1998]
No.	Title	Writer(s)	Length
1.	"Oye" (Rosabel's Cubarican Club Edit)	Gloria Estefan, Emilio Estefan, Jr., Randall Barlow, Angie Chirino	7:35
2.	"Oye" (Mijangos House Dub)	Gloria Estefan, Emilio Estefan, Jr., Randall Barlow, Angie Chirino	8:09
3.	"Oye" (Rosabel's Havana Dub)	Gloria Estefan, Emilio Estefan, Jr., Randall Barlow, Angie Chirino	8:05
4.	"Oye" (Hex Hector Bonus Beats)	Gloria Estefan, Emilio Estefan, Jr., Randall Barlow, Angie Chirino	4:00

US promo 12" vinyl single #3 (AED 79030) [August 1998]
No.	Title	Writer(s)	Length
1.	"Oye" (Rosabel's Cubarican Club Mix)	Gloria Estefan, Emilio Estefan, Jr., Randall Barlow, Angie Chirino	9:55
2.	"Oye" (Chris the Greek's Caliente Mix)	Gloria Estefan, Emilio Estefan, Jr., Randall Barlow, Angie Chirino	5:11
3.	"Oye" (Rosabel's Data-Flash Dub)	Gloria Estefan, Emilio Estefan, Jr., Randall Barlow, Angie Chirino	8:11
4.	"Oye" (Hex Hector Dub)	Gloria Estefan, Emilio Estefan, Jr., Randall Barlow, Angie Chirino	7:26

Europe CD single (EPC 665953 1) [July 1998]
No.	Title	Writer(s)	Length
1.	"Oye" (TM's Radio Edit)	Gloria Estefan, Emilio Estefan, Jr., Randall Barlow, Angie Chirino	3:56
2.	"Oye" (Pablo Flores English Remix Radio Edit)	Gloria Estefan, Emilio Estefan, Jr., Randall Barlow, Angie Chirino	4:18
3.	"Gloria's Hitmix (Edit)" (I'm Not Giving You Up / You'll Be Mine (Party Time) / Mi Tierra / Live For Loving You / Tres Deseos / Everlasting Love / Turn the Beat Around)	Gloria Estefan, Kike Santander, Emilio Estefan Jr., Lawrence Dermer, Clay Ostwald, Estefano, Diane Warren, Buzz Cason, Mac Gayden, Peter Jackson, Gerald Jackson	5:01

Europe CD single (EPC 666116 1) [July 27, 1998]
No.	Title	Writer(s)	Length
1.	"Oye" (TM's Radio Edit)	Gloria Estefan, Emilio Estefan, Jr., Randall Barlow, Angie Chirino	3:56
2.	"Oye" (Pablo Flores English Remix Radio Edit)	Gloria Estefan, Emilio Estefan, Jr., Randall Barlow, Angie Chirino	4:18

Europe CD maxi-single #1 (EPC 666116 2) [July 27, 1998]
No.	Title	Writer(s)	Length
1.	"Oye" (TM's Radio Edit)	Gloria Estefan, Emilio Estefan, Jr., Randall Barlow, Angie Chirino	3:56
2.	"Oye" (Pablo Flores English Remix Radio Edit)	Gloria Estefan, Emilio Estefan, Jr., Randall Barlow, Angie Chirino	4:18
3.	"Oye" (Mijangos Latin Radio Edit)	Gloria Estefan, Emilio Estefan, Jr., Randall Barlow, Angie Chirino	4:00
4.	"Oye" (Rosabel's Cubarican Radio Edit)	Gloria Estefan, Emilio Estefan, Jr., Randall Barlow, Angie Chirino	3:51
5.	"Oye" (Pablo Flores 12" Mix)	Gloria Estefan, Emilio Estefan, Jr., Randall Barlow, Angie Chirino	8:24

Europe CD maxi-single #2 (The Remixes) [EPC 666116 5] {July 27, 1998}
No.	Title	Writer(s)	Length
1.	"Oye" (Mijangos Latin Mix)	Gloria Estefan, Emilio Estefan, Jr., Randall Barlow, Angie Chirino	9:41
2.	"Oye" (Mijangos Club Mix)	Gloria Estefan, Emilio Estefan, Jr., Randall Barlow, Angie Chirino	8:25
3.	"Oye" (Rosabel's Cubarican Club Mix)	Gloria Estefan, Emilio Estefan, Jr., Randall Barlow, Angie Chirino	9:55

Europe 12" vinyl single #1 (EPC 666116 6) [July 27, 1998]
No.	Title	Writer(s)	Length
1.	"Oye" (Pablo Flores 12" Mix)	Gloria Estefan, Emilio Estefan, Jr., Randall Barlow, Angie Chirino	8:24
2.	"Oye" (Pablo Flores Dub Mix)	Gloria Estefan, Emilio Estefan, Jr., Randall Barlow, Angie Chirino	6:10
3.	"Oye" (Pablo Flores English Remix Radio Edit)	Gloria Estefan, Emilio Estefan, Jr., Randall Barlow, Angie Chirino	4:18
4.	"Oye" (Mijangos Latin Mix w/ English Vocals)	Gloria Estefan, Emilio Estefan, Jr., Randall Barlow, Angie Chirino	9:41
5.	"Oye" (Mijangos Club Mix w/ English Vocals)	Gloria Estefan, Emilio Estefan, Jr., Randall Barlow, Angie Chirino	8:25

Europe 12" vinyl single #2 (The Remixes) [EPC 666116 8] {July 27, 1998}
No.	Title	Writer(s)	Length
1.	"Oye" (Rosabel's Cubarican Club Mix)	Gloria Estefan, Emilio Estefan, Jr., Randall Barlow, Angie Chirino	9:55
2.	"Oye" (Rosabel's Data-Flash Dub)	Gloria Estefan, Emilio Estefan, Jr., Randall Barlow, Angie Chirino	8:11
3.	"Oye" (Mijangos Latin Mix)	Gloria Estefan, Emilio Estefan, Jr., Randall Barlow, Angie Chirino	9:41
4.	"Oye" (Mijangos Club Mix)	Gloria Estefan, Emilio Estefan, Jr., Randall Barlow, Angie Chirino	8:25

Europe promo CD single (SAMPCS 5603) [July 1998]
No.	Title	Writer(s)	Length
1.	"Oye" (TM's Radio Edit)	Gloria Estefan, Emilio Estefan, Jr., Randall Barlow, Angie Chirino	3:56
2.	"Oye" (Pablo Flores English Remix Radio Edit)	Gloria Estefan, Emilio Estefan, Jr., Randall Barlow, Angie Chirino	4:18

Europe promo 12" vinyl single (SAMPMS 5604) [July 1998]
No.	Title	Writer(s)	Length
1.	"Oye" (Pablo Flores 12" Mix)	Gloria Estefan, Emilio Estefan, Jr., Randall Barlow, Angie Chirino	8:24
2.	"Oye" (Pablo Flores Dub Mix)	Gloria Estefan, Emilio Estefan, Jr., Randall Barlow, Angie Chirino	6:10
3.	"Oye" (Pablo Flores English Remix Radio Edit)	Gloria Estefan, Emilio Estefan, Jr., Randall Barlow, Angie Chirino	4:18
4.	"Oye" (Mijangos Latin Mix w/ English Vocals)	Gloria Estefan, Emilio Estefan, Jr., Randall Barlow, Angie Chirino	9:41
5.	"Oye" (Mijangos Club Mix w/ English Vocals)	Gloria Estefan, Emilio Estefan, Jr., Randall Barlow, Angie Chirino	8:25

UK CD maxi-single #1 (666464 2) [September 28, 1998]
No.	Title	Writer(s)	Length
1.	"Oye" (Pablo Flores English Remix Radio Edit)	Gloria Estefan, Emilio Estefan, Jr., Randall Barlow, Angie Chirino	4:19
2.	"Oye" (Hex Hector 12" Mix)	Gloria Estefan, Emilio Estefan, Jr., Randall Barlow, Angie Chirino	7:51
3.	"Oye" (DJ Greek's Caliente Mix)	Gloria Estefan, Emilio Estefan, Jr., Randall Barlow, Angie Chirino	5:11

UK CD maxi-single #2 (666464 5) [September 28, 1998]
No.	Title	Writer(s)	Length
1.	"Oye" (TM's Radio Edit)	Gloria Estefan, Emilio Estefan, Jr., Randall Barlow, Angie Chirino	4:18
2.	"Oye" (Rosabel's Cubarican Club Edit)	Gloria Estefan, Emilio Estefan, Jr., Randall Barlow, Angie Chirino	7:34
3.	"Heaven's What I Feel" (Ballad Version)	Kike Santander	4:24

UK cassette single (666464 4) [September 28, 1998]
No.	Title	Writer(s)	Length
1.	"Oye" (TM's Radio Edit)	Gloria Estefan, Emilio Estefan, Jr., Randall Barlow, Angie Chirino	4:18
2.	"Heaven's What I Feel" (Ballad Version)	Kike Santander	4:24

UK promo CD single (XPCD 2287) [September 1998]
No.	Title	Writer(s)	Length
1.	"Oye" (Pablo Flores English Remix Radio Edit)	Gloria Estefan, Emilio Estefan, Jr., Randall Barlow, Angie Chirino	4:18
2.	"Oye" (TM's Radio Edit)	Gloria Estefan, Emilio Estefan, Jr., Randall Barlow, Angie Chirino	4:17

UK promo 12" vinyl #1 (XPR 3265) [September 1998]
No.	Title	Writer(s)	Length
1.	"Oye" (Hex Hector 12" Mix)	Gloria Estefan, Emilio Estefan, Jr., Randall Barlow, Angie Chirino	8:00
2.	"Oye" (Hex Hector Dub)	Gloria Estefan, Emilio Estefan, Jr., Randall Barlow, Angie Chirino	7:30
3.	"Oye" (Hex Hector Radio Mix)	Gloria Estefan, Emilio Estefan, Jr., Randall Barlow, Angie Chirino	4:00

UK promo 12" vinyl #2 (XPR 3269) [September 1998]
No.	Title	Writer(s)	Length
1.	"Oye" (DJ Greek's Dark Club Mix)	Gloria Estefan, Emilio Estefan, Jr., Randall Barlow, Angie Chirino	6:26
2.	"Oye" (DJ Greek's Caliente Mix)	Gloria Estefan, Emilio Estefan, Jr., Randall Barlow, Angie Chirino	5:11

== Official versions and remixes ==
Original versions

1. Album version – 4:40
2. Extra-large album version – 5:05
3. Tony Moran Radio Edit #1 – 3:52
4. Tony Moran Radio Edit #2 – 4:17

Remixes

1. Pablo Flores English Remix Radio Edit (aka Pablo Flores Remix) – (4:17)
2. Pablo Flores Spanish Remix Radio Edit (aka Pablo Flores Spanish Remix) – (4:17)
3. Pablo Flores 12" Mix – (8:24
4. Pablo Flores Dub Mix – (5:10
5. Rosabel's Cubarican Club Mix – (9:55)
6. Rosabel's Cubarican Club Edit – (7:35
7. Rosabel's Cubarican English Radio Edit (aka Rosabel's Cubarican Radio Edit #1) – (3:51)
8. Rosabel's Cubarican Spanish Radio Edit (aka Rosabel's Cubarican Radio Edit #2) – (3:51)
9. Rosabel's Data-Flash Dub – (8:13)
10. Rosabel's Havana Dub – (8:05)
11. Mijangos Latin Mix w/ English Vocals – (9:41)
12. Mijangos Latin Mix w/ Spanish Vocals – (9:41)
13. Mijangos Latin Radio Edit – (4:00)
14. Mijangos English Radio Edit – (4:00)
15. Mijangos House Dub – (8:09
16. Mijangos Club Mix w/ English Vocals – (8:25
17. Mijangos Club Mix w/ Spanish Vocals – (8:25
18. Hex Hector 12" Mix – (7:50
19. Hex Hector Radio Mix – (4:00
20. Hex Hector Dub – (7:30
21. Hex Hector Bonus Beats – (4:00
22. DJ Greek's Dark Club Mix – (6:24)
23. DJ Greek's Caliente Mix – (5:10
24. Clamaran & Pautrat's Club Mix – (7:28)
25. Clamaran & Pautrat's Radio Edit – (3:46
26. Clamaran & Pautrat's Ultra Dub + Voices – (7:15
27. Clamaran & Pautrat's Ultra Dub – 6:42

== Charts ==
Chart (1998)	Peak position
Australia (ARIA)	107
Belgium (Ultratop Flanders)	15
Europe (Eurochart Hot 100)	54
France (SNEP)	39
Japan (Japanese Singles Chart)	7
Netherlands (Single Top 100)	81
Scotland (OCC)	39
Spain (AFYVE)	1
UK Singles (OCC)	33
US Hot Dance Music/Club Play (Billboard)	1
US Hot Latin Tracks (Billboard)	1
US Latin Pop Airplay (Billboard)	3
US Latin Tropical/Salsa Airplay (Billboard)	1

== See also ==
- List of number-one Billboard Hot Latin Tracks of 1998
- List of number-one Billboard Hot Tropical Songs from the 1990s
- Number-one dance hits of 1998 (USA)
