= Best of Gloria Estefan =

Compilation album by Gloria Estefan
- Released: February 15, 1997 (France); February 13, 1998 (France Re-release)
- Recorded: Crescent Moon Studios, Miami
- Genre: Pop
- Length: 69:38
- Label: Epic
- Producer: Emilio Estefan Jr.

Gloria Estefan chronology
Destiny (1996)	Best of Gloria Estefan (1997)	gloria! (1998)

Best of Gloria Estefan is the third solo compilation album released by American singer Gloria Estefan after "Exitos" and "Gloria Estefan Greatest Hits", but is the twentieth overall, released in 1997. The compilation was released only in France and Switzerland.

== Release ==
This compilation was initially an exclusive release in France. The compilation was re-released in France, Switzerland, and the Benelux countries following the success of the single "You'll Be Mine (Party Time)"

This album peaked number three on the French album chart and is Estefan's highest peaking album in the country.

No singles were released to promote the compilation.

== Track listing ==
1998 Reissue [CD: EPC 487195 9 / Cassette: EPC 487195 3] (February 16, 1998)
No.	Title	Writer(s)	Length
1.	"You'll Be Mine (Party Time) [Single Mix]"	Emilio Estefan, Jr., Lawrence Dermer, Clay Ostwald	4:01
2.	"Conga"	Enrique E. Garcia	4:22
3.	"Dr. Beat"	Enrique E. Garcia	4:15
4.	"Anything For You"	Gloria Estefan	3:59
5.	"1-2-3 (Remix)"	Gloria Estefan, Enrique E. Garcia	3:34
6.	"Rhythm Is Gonna Get You"	Gloria Estefan, Enrique E. Garcia	3:55
7.	"Here We Are"	Gloria Estefan	4:50
8.	"Don't Wanna Lose You"	Gloria Estefan	4:09
9.	"Get On Your Feet"	John DeFaria, Jorge Casas, Clay Ostwald	3:58
10.	"Oye Mi Canto (Spanish Version)"	Gloria Estefan, Jorge Casas, Clay Ostwald	4:55
11.	"Coming Out Of The Dark"	Gloria Estefan, Emilio Estefan, Jr., Jon Secada	4:44
12.	"Con Los Años Que Me Quedan"	Gloria Estefan, Emilio Estefan, Jr.	4:36
13.	"Mi Tierra"	Estéfano	4:38
14.	"Montuno"	Juanito R. Marquez	4:56
15.	"Ayer"	Juanito R. Marquez	5:14
16.	"Abriendo Puertas"	Kike Santander	3:52
17.	"Everlasting Love"	Buzz Cason, Mac Gayden	4:01

=== Notes ===
- The original edition of the album released on February 15, 1997 excludes "You'll Be Mine (Party Time)".

== Charts ==
Chart (1998)	Peak position
French Albums (SNEP)	3
Swiss Albums (Schweizer Hitparade)	40

== Certifications and sales ==
Region	Certification	Certified units/sales
France (SNEP)	2× Gold	200,000^{*}
^{*} Sales figures based on certification alone.
