= Show Me the Way Back to Your Heart =

Single by Gloria Estefan

from the album Destiny
- Released: 1997 (Brazil)
- Recorded: 1995–1996
- Genre: Pop
- Length: 3:57
- Label: Epic
- Songwriter(s): Diane Warren
- Producer(s): Emilio Estefan, Jr.; Lawrence Dermer

Gloria Estefan singles chronology
"I'm Not Giving You Up" / "Higher" (1997)	"Show Me the Way Back to Your Heart" (1997)	"No Pretendo" (1997)

"Show Me the Way Back to Your Heart" is a 1997 song by American singer and songwriter Gloria Estefan. It was released as a promotional and fifth overall single from her seventh studio album, Destiny. The song is written by American songwriter Diane Warren as an English rendition of the song "S'aimer encore une fois" ("Still Love Once Again") by Canadian singer Katee Julien (which had lyrics in French by Eddy Marnay). It was released exclusively to Brazil as a promotional single. The single included another version of the song with a simultaneous Portuguese translation by Robson Castro.

The song was performed during select dates during the 1997 Evolution World Tour, as well as Diane Warren's "Love Song" Special, performed for PBS in 2010. The song was performed once on the 2008 90 Millas World Tour in Barcelona.

== Critical reception ==
The Daily Vault's Mark Millan wrote that "Show Me the Way Back to Your Heart" is "almost perfect, and while [it] could have been another signature mushy Warren ballad, in the hands of the reenergized Miami Sound Machine, it's transformed into an acoustic masterpiece." Ian Fortnam from NME said the song has "potential" to become an "enormo-hit".

== Other versions ==
Luis Fonsi recorded a Spanish version of this song titled "Dime Como Vuelvo a Tener tu Corazón," and was included on his album Eterno.

Brian McKnight also sang a version on his Anytime album in 1997.

Cosima De Vito covered the song on her 2004 self-titled debut album.

== Track listing ==
Brazil Promo CD Single (899.242)
No.	Title	Writer(s)	Length
1.	"Show Me The Way Back To Your Heart" (Versão Album Com Tradução [Portuguese Spoken Translation)	Diane Warren	3:54
2.	"Show Me The Way Back To Your Heart" (Album Version)	Diane Warren	3:57
