= Reach (Gloria Estefan song) =

1996 song by Gloria Estefan

Single by Gloria Estefan

from the album Destiny
- Released: April 1996
- Recorded: 1995–1996
- Genre: Pop; ballad
- Length: 3:50
- Label: Epic
- Songwriters: Gloria Estefan; Diane Warren
- Producers: Emilio Estefan Jr.; Lawrence Dermer

Gloria Estefan singles chronology
"La Parranda" (1996)	"Reach" (1996)	"You'll Be Mine (Party Time)" (1996)

Music video
- "Reach" on YouTube

"Reach" is a song by Cuban-American singer and songwriter Gloria Estefan, released in April 1996 by Epic Records. It was co-written by Estefan with Diane Warren and served as the official theme song of the 1996 Summer Olympics held in Atlanta, Georgia in the United States. The single was included on the official Atlanta 1996 album, Rhythm of the Games, and later on Estefan's seventh studio album, Destiny (1996). It became a European hit, peaking within the top 10 in the Czech Republic, Hungary, Norway, and Spain, where it reached number two. In the UK, it peaked at number 15, while on the Eurochart Hot 100, the song reached number 47 in June 1996. Outside Europe, it peaked at number 23 in Australia as well as number 42 on the US Billboard Hot 100. "Reach" was nominated for a Grammy Award for Best Female Pop Vocal Performance at the ceremony in 1997, but lost out to Toni Braxton's "Un-Break My Heart", which was also written by Diane Warren. The accompanying music video for the song was directed by Marcus Nispel and made in two different edits.

Estefan recorded a Spanish version of the song, "Puedes Llegar" (in English: "You Can Arrive"), with Julio Iglesias, Plácido Domingo, Jon Secada, Alejandro Fernández, Roberto Carlos, Ricky Martin, José Luis Rodríguez, Patricia Sosa and Carlos Vives on vocals. This version can be found on the Spanish version of the Olympics compilation album, Voces Unidas.

== Background and release ==
"It's about starting over and getting up and moving, so yeah, I can identify very strongly with it. We really wanted the song to be something that everyone could identify with. It was done as a folk song and then, because of the grandness of the Olympics, we threw on the big drums. But it is a song for every culture."

— Gloria Estefan talking about the song.

"Reach" was seen by many as the most progressive project of her career until then. The single became available for radio and club airplay on March 26, 1996. It can be described as an anthemic and inspirational ballad with an Olympic tie-in featuring both drums and a gospel choir. It was the official theme song of the 1996 Summer Olympics which began in Atlanta, Georgia in the United States on July 19. Estefan performed the song at the closing ceremony on August 4.

It was written by Estefan and famed tunesmith Diane Warren, and co-produced by Estefan's husband, Emilio Estefan Jr. and Lawrence Dermer. After Warren came up with its title, she and Estefan wrote the lyrics of the song in 20 minutes. The lyrics are about overcoming troubled times and coming back stronger than ever. Radio reactions to the song were strong and the videoclip got active play on various music TV channels, like VH1. It also received remixes from David Morales, Pablo Flores and Love To Infinity.

The song appears on Estefan's compilation albums Greatest Hits Vol. II (2001), The Very Best of Gloria Estefan (2006) and The Essential Gloria Estefan (2006).

== Critical reception ==
The song received favorable reviews from most music critics. Scottish Aberdeen Press and Journal complimented Estefan, who "still has an admirable voice". Editor Stephen Thomas Erlewine for AllMusic stated in his review of Destiny, that "Reach" "rank with her finest work", with the other album tracks "I'm Not Giving You Up" and "Higher". Another AllMusic editor, Jon O'Brien, felt the song perhaps is "her finest moment, a motivational power ballad complete with gospel choir and tribal drums." Larry Flick from Billboard magazine described it as a "stately power ballad" and an "outstanding recording". He remarked that Estefan "has rarely sounded so vocally flexible and confident, broadening her range to wonderfully appealing heights within a softly building pool of percussion and gospel-spiked choir chants." He also felt that "by the dramatic close, the song has risen to inspirational anthemic proportions." Billboard editor Paul Verna declared it as "uplifting". The Daily Vault's Mark Millan named it the best track on the album and added that 'musically it's very "international" and lyrically it's very uplifting.' Chris Hicks from The Deseret News praised it as "gorgeous." Josef Woodard from Entertainment Weekly called it a "feel-goody" song.

Dave Sholin from the Gavin Report felt that "the remarkable performer really shines when she has new material that showcases her signature style", adding that the collaboration with pop songwriting genius Diane Warren "results in a production which is quintessential Gloria Estefan." Roger Catlin from Hartford Courant said that the singer 'is savvy enough to save her trump card for last—her Olympic anthem 'Reach'.' Jeremy Griffin from The Ithacan deemed the song as a "triumphant anthem." Richard Smith from Melody Maker felt if featured the singer in "a wistful, adult-orientated kinda way". Pan-European magazine Music & Media called it a "sweeping ballad dominated by slow, impressive drums which swell to a climax towards the end." Estefan's voice was complimented as "warm and strong, amplified by a gospel choir, but she wisely eschews any vocal acrobatics." A reviewer from Music Week gave it a top score of five out of five and named it Single of the Week, adding, "It's a top-notch curtain-raiser to her first English-language album in five years, and it's a smash." Ian Fortnam from NME stated in his review of the album, that "it is 'Reach' that is truly destined to break the global bank this summer as the official anthem of the Olympic Games." David W. Bothner from Pittsburgh Post-Gazette declared it as a "surprisingly folksy tune." Bob Waliszewski of Plugged In remarked that it expresses a "willingness to 'go the distance' to fulfill a promise."

== Music video ==
"To have a song forever tied to a ceremony like that, especially to play it at the closing ceremony, when everyone has won their medals, is a really great experience."

— Gloria Estefan talking to Music Week about the song.

A black-and-white music video was produced to promote the single. It was directed by German film director and producer Marcus Nispel and premiered in April 1996. The video was shot at Key Biscayne Beach in Florida and features Estefan standing on a high colossus by the sea, like a monumental goddess. She holds a long black transparent veil that blows in the wind. Birds fly in the air and the sun shining on the sea reflects back on Estefan as she sings.

There are at least two different edits of the video. The most common version shows Estefan performing mixed with different TV images of the olympic flag and various Olympic athletes performing in their genres. The other version is called the Vogue version.

== Track listing ==
- Original Versions
1. Album Version — (3:50)
2. Single Version (w/o Chorus Ending) — (3:50)
3. Spanish Version ("Puedes Llegar") — (3:50)
- Pablo Flores & Javier Garza Remixes
1. Gold Medal Mix — (6:46)
2. Gold Medal Single Edit — (4:43)
- Love To Infinity Remixes
1. Love To Infinity's Master Mix — (5:00)
2. Love To Infinity's Pure & Free Mix — (6:27)
3. Love To Infinity's Radio Master Mix — (4:18)
4. Love To Infinity's Walk In The Park Radio Mix — (4:12)
5. Love To Infinity's Walk In The Park Mix — (6:27)
6. Love To Infinity's Aphrodisiac Mix — (6:58)
- David Morales Remixes
1. Higher Radio Mix — (3:50)
2. Higher Club Mix (Vox Up) — (10:42)
3. Higher Club Mix — (10:42)
4. Reachin' Dub — (8:10)
5. Dubstrumental — (7:30)

== Charts ==
Chart (1996)	Peak position
Australia (ARIA)	23
Canada Top Singles (RPM)	26
Canada Adult Contemporary (RPM)	6
Czech Republic (IFPI CR)	3
Estonia (Eesti Top 20)	15
Europe (Eurochart Hot 100)	47
Germany (GfK)	58
Hungary (Mahasz)	8
Israel (Israeli Singles Chart)	6
Italy (Musica e dischi)	21
Italy Airplay (Music & Media)	4
Netherlands (Dutch Top 40 Tipparade)	2
Netherlands (Single Top 100)	46
Norway (VG-lista)	10
Scotland (OCC)	18
Spain (Promusicae)	2
Sweden (Sverigetopplistan)	19
UK Singles (Official Charts)	15
UK Airplay (Music Week)	14
US Billboard Hot 100	42
US Adult Contemporary (Billboard)	5
US Adult Pop Airplay (Billboard)	29
US Dance Club Songs (Billboard)	2
US Cash Box Top 100	50
US CHR/Pop (Radio & Records)	36

== Puedes Llegar ==
"Puedes Llegar"

Single by Various artists

from the album Voces Unidas
- Released: 1996
- Recorded: 1996
- Genre: Folk rock
- Length: 4:13
- Label: EMI Latin
- Songwriters: Gloria Estefan; Diane Warren
- Producer: Emilio Estefan

Music video
- "Puedes Llegar" on YouTube

A Spanish version called "Puedes Llegar" was recorded in 1996 which featured vocals from Gloria Estefan, Jon Secada, Julio Iglesias, Plácido Domingo, Roberto Carlos, Jose Luis Rodríguez, Patricia Sosa, Alejandro Fernández, Ricky Martin and Carlos Vives. "Puedes Llegar" was included as the opening track for EMI Latin's Voces Unidas, the official Spanish-speaking album for 1996 Olympic Games.

"Puedes Llegar" was released as a promotional single and reached the position 2 on Billboard Hot Latin Tracks and Latin Airplay charts in June 1996.

== Charts ==
Chart (1996)	Peak position
US Hot Latin Tracks (Billboard)	2
US Latin Pop Airplay (Billboard)	3
US Regional Mexican Airplay (Billboard)	18
US Tropical Airplay (Billboard)	10
