= No Pretendo =

Single by Gloria Estefan

from the album Destiny
- Released: 1997
- Recorded: 1995–1996
- Genre: Latin pop
- Length: 3:47
- Label: Epic
- Songwriter: Kike Santander

Gloria Estefan singles chronology
"Show Me the Way Back to Your Heart" (1997)	"No Pretendo" (1997)	"En El Jardín" (1997)

"No Pretendo" ("I Don't Pretend To") is a 1997 song by American singer and songwriter Gloria Estefan. It was released as the sixth and final single from her seventh studio album, Destiny. This song is the Spanish-language version of the song "Steal Your Heart", from Destiny. It was released on international editions of the album, as well as a single in the United States and Spain, where the single peaked at number 28. The music video was recorded live from the Evolution World Tour in Mexico City at the Estadio Azteca. In 2004, "No Pretendo" was made available on the compilations, Amor y Suerte: Éxitos Románticos, and Oye Mi Canto!: Los Grandes Exitos in 2006.

== Charts ==
Chart (1997)	Peak position
Spain (AFYVE)	28
US Billboard Hot Latin Tracks	1
US Billboard Latin Pop Airplay	1
US Billboard Latin Tropical/Salsa Airplay	4

== See also ==
- Number-one hits of 1997 (U.S. Hot Latin Tracks)
- List of Billboard Latin Pop Airplay number ones of 1997
