= Higher (Gloria Estefan song) =

Single by Gloria Estefan

from the album Destiny
- Released: November 19, 1996
- Genre: Dance
- Length: 3:50
- Label: Epic
- Songwriter: Lawrence Dermer
- Producers: Emilio Estefan, Jr.; Lawrence Dermer

Gloria Estefan singles chronology
"You'll Be Mine (Party Time)" (1996)	"I'm Not Giving You Up" / "Higher" (1996)	"Show Me the Way Back to Your Heart" (1997)

Music video
- "Higher" on YouTube

"Higher" is a song by Cuban-American singer and songwriter Gloria Estefan, released in November 1996 by Epic Records. It served as the fourth single from her seventh studio album, Destiny (1996). It was written by Lawrence Dermer and co-produced by him with Emilio Estefan, Jr. In the United States and Canada, it was released as a double-sided single along with "I'm Not Giving You Up". However, in other countries, it was released solely as a single. It peaked at numbers five and 11 on the US Billboard Hot Dance Music/Maxi-Singles Sales and Hot Dance Club Play charts. The music video for the song is not available in its original version on the album but can be found in the "Big Red Video Remix" as part of the video compilation Don't Stop!. During live performances at some concerts, the song is often blended with Estefan's Latin hit "Tres Deseos".

== Critical reception ==
AllMusic editor Stephen Thomas Erlewine praised "Higher", stating that it ranks among Estefan's finest work, along with other album tracks such as "Reach" and "I'm Not Giving You Up". Larry Flick from Billboard magazine described it as a "festive street-party anthem". Another Billboard editor, Paul Verna, named it an "anti-drug anthem". Daina Darzin from Cash Box complimented it as a "standout" of the album, noting its "ferocious salsa beat".

The Daily Vault's Mark Millan called it a "chill-out groove", "which is just as much fun but not as noisy" like "You'll Be Mine (Party Time)". He stated that it "add much needed light into what is a very mood-driven and introspective collection of songs." People Magazine stated that "her sensual vocal style works best when it rides a firecracker groove." The reviewer added, "When she gets wild and frisky in the congo stomp of 'Higher', Estefan can even get a grandma leaping from her rocking chair and dancing into the streets." Fernando Gonzales from Star-News named it a "good-time romp".

== Charts ==
Chart (1996)	Peak position
Spain (AFYVE)	32
US Hot Dance Club Play (Billboard)	11
US Hot Dance Music/Maxi-Singles Sales (Billboard)	5
