= I'm Not Giving You Up =

Single by Gloria Estefan

from the album Destiny
- Released: November 19, 1996
- Recorded: 1995–1996
- Genre: Pop; ballad
- Length: 4:20
- Label: Epic
- Songwriters: Gloria Estefan; Kike Santander

Gloria Estefan singles chronology
"You'll Be Mine (Party Time)" (1996)	"I'm Not Giving You Up" / "Higher" (1996)	"Show Me the Way Back to Your Heart" (1996)

Music video
- "I'm Not Giving You Up" on YouTube

"I'm Not Giving You Up" is a song by Cuban American singer and songwriter Gloria Estefan, released in November 1996, by Epic Records, as the third single from her seventh studio album, Destiny (1996). It is written by Estefan with Kike Santander and was popular more by its single remix by Tony Moran, which later was included on Estefan's 2001 Greatest Hits Vol. II compilation instead of its original version. In the US, the song was released as a double single along with "Higher". In Europe, it was released to coincide with the European leg of Estefan's Evolution World Tour. "I'm Not Giving You Up" peaked at number 11 in Spain, number 28 in the UK and number 33 in Scotland. In the US, the song reached number 40 on the Billboard Hot 100.

== Critical reception ==
The song received favorable reviews from several music critics. AllMusic editor Stephen Thomas Erlewine said that it "rank with her finest work", with the other album tracks "Reach" and "Higher". Larry Flick from Billboard magazine noted that "the pace drops to a seductive and percussive shuffle, allowing her to stretch her lovely voice and perform with affecting emotion. Swathed in fragile acoustic guitars and caressing strings, the chorus is impossible to shake from the mind after one listen." He also stated that the popular Tony Moran remix "provides a swirling, flamenco-flavored disco remix that has a pleasant charm", similar to the No Mercy hit "Where Do You Go". On the album release, the magazine also described it as a "lushly textured romantic ballad". Daina Darzin from Cash Box named it a standout of the album, and "gorgeously romantic". The Daily Vault's Mark Millan said it "reveals the emotional journey of the Estefan's enduring marriage." Jeremy Griffin from The Ithacan deemed it a "torrid ballad". British Music Week gave it a score of four out of five and named it "a smoochie ballad which should do well for Christmas". They added, "Expect a hit." Ian Fortnam from NME felt it has potential "to become a enormo-hit".

== Formats and track listings ==
These are the formats and track listings of major single releases of "I'm Not Giving You Up".

- UK CD maxi single (664022 5)
1. "I'm Not Giving You Up" (Album Version)
2. "I'm Not Giving You Up" (Tony Moran 12" Club Mix)
3. "Anything For You" (Album Version)
4. "Let It Snow, Let It Snow, Let It Snow" (Album Version)
- US CD maxi single (49K 78465)
1. "I'm Not Giving You Up" (Album Version)
2. "I'm Not Giving You Up" (Tony Moran Single Radio Edit)
3. "I'm Not Giving You Up" (Tony Moran 12" Club Mix)
4. "Higher" (Junior Vasquez's Single Edit)
5. "Higher" (Pablo Flores & Javier Garza's Single Remix)
6. "Higher" (Cibola's Radio Edit)
7. "Higher" (Junior Vasquez's 12" Club Mix)
8. "Higher/Tres Deseos Medley" (Tony Moran Live Remix)

== Charts ==
Chart (1996)	Peak position
Australia (ARIA)	114
Netherlands (Dutch Top 40 Tipparade)	19
Spain (Promusicae)	11
Scotland (OCC)	33
UK Singles (Official Charts)	28
UK Airplay (Music Control)	64
US Billboard Hot 100	40
US Adult Contemporary (Billboard)	9
US Rhythmic Airplay (Billboard)	38
