= List of Gloria Estefan concert tours =

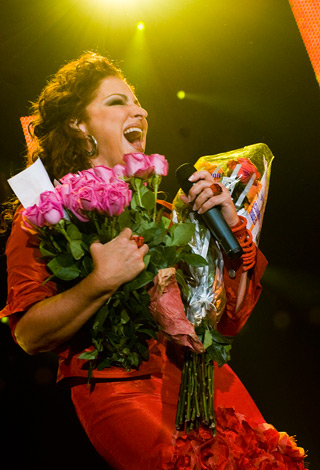
Gloria on her 90 Millas World Tour in Rotterdam, Netherlands

This is a list of concert tours by Gloria Estefan, a Cuban-American pop singer.

== Tour information ==
Since 1985, Estefan has embarked on six worldwide concert tours performing in several locations worldwide including the five continents. Estefan's first tour was with the Miami Sound Machine and was the tour for support of the album Primitive Love named "Primitive Love Tour" in 1985. Her last tour in 2008, the "90 Millas World Tour," was made to promote the album 90 Millas.

Among all the tours made and listed here the first two are with the Miami Sound Machine, in which Estefan was the lead vocalist, since their separation in 1989, Estefan credited alone and embarked in four tours, two of them, the "Into The Light" and "Evolution" are cataloged as world tours, and are the most successful on Estefan's career

Gloria Estefan first tour with the Miami Sound Machine "Primitive Love Tour" was a tour only to the United States with a low budget and just performances of their album, since that tour all the other tours by Estefan had been praised and critically acclaimed, especially her 1996/1997 "Evolution World Tour" which was created with a very different concept and making it more a show than just a concert, it eventually became one of the fans favorites and was one of the most successful tour ever for Estefan.

With the release of the 2007 Spanish-language album 90 Millas, Gloria Estefan did a tour of the European continent to promote the album. Gloria started the tour in August 2008 in Valencia, Spain, and then went to London and also her first concert to a British audience since a decade. She also visited Belfast, Rotterdam and Tenerife. Estefan also performed at the Aruba Music Festival on October 11

In April 2009, Gloria Estefan she started her first tour of Latin America. She performed in Argentina, Chile, Uruguay and others Latin-American countries. This was the second leg to her last tour promoting 90 Millas. Due to the success of the last performances of Estefan to Europe, she will return to a series of music festivals included as part of this tour in the summer season in 2009, including three more cities: Milan, Locarno and Liverpool. She also added another three dates to the US, as part of a special concert with Carole King for a performance at the Foxwoods Resort Casino, the show being part of this tour is called "She Got's A Friend".

== Tours ==
Year	Title	Duration	Number of performances	Release format(s)
1985–1986	Primitive Love Tour	1985–1986 (U.S., Latin America, Japan)	?	Unreleased
This tour, also known as the "Conga Tour", was the first tour ever made by the Miami Sound Machine at the United States and Japan. It was a tour with a low-budget made only to promote the album sales of Primitive Love at these countries.
1987–1988	Let It Loose World Tour	1987–1988 (U.S., Canada, Southeast Asia, Japan)	?	VHS, Laserdisc&DVD
Miami Sound Machine's first world tour with a high profile and also with a higher budget than the past one, was made to promote the album Let It Loose, going to more cities at the United States and visiting more countries such those of the southeast of the Asian continent; it also visited for the very first time the country of Canada. The October 1, 1988 concert at the Miami Arena was released on VHS. The setlist for the tour was: 1. Conga (Intro) 2. Hot Summer Nights 3. Bad Boy 4. Primitive Love 5. Surrender 6. Let It Loose 7. Baila Conmigo/A Toda Maquina/Dingui-Li-Bangui (Medley) 8. Falling in Love (Uh-Oh) 9. Words Get in the Way 10. No Sera Facil/Me Enamore/Renacer (Medley) 11. 1-2-3 12. Rhythm Is Gonna Get You 13. Conga 14. Betcha Say That 15. Anything For You
1989–1990	Get On Your Feet World Tour	1989–1990 (U.S., Canada, UK, Europe, Japan)	?	Unreleased
Gloria Estefan first solo tour, made to promote the album Cuts Both Ways, was set to be one of the biggest tours of the star, first planning 50 tour stops around the world, but after the tragic accident that happened to Estefan which took her to the edge of death, the tour was canceled and only twenty-three stops happened, letting Australia and the rest of the United States with no shows given. The setlist for the tour was: 1. Intro/ Conga 2. 1-2-3 3. Ay, Ay, I 4. Here We Are 5. Can't Stay Away From You 6. Words Get In The Way 7. Surrender 8. Bad Boy 9. Nothin' New 10. Anything For You 11. Cuts Both Ways 12. Let It Loose 13. Dr. Beat 14. Don't Wanna Lose You 15. Say 16. Oye Mi Canto 17. Rhythm Is Gonna Get You 18. Get On Your Feet 19. Conga (Encore/reprise)
1991–1992	Into The Light World Tour	March 1, 1991–March 15, 1992 (Worldwide)	101	VHS, LaserDisc & DVD
Gloria's first colossal world tour, with more than 100 stops, with most of the stops getting sold out, it became Estefan's most successful tour to then and it also been the most successful tour ever for a Latin artist in the moment. It was Estefan's first world tour since the discontinued "Get On Your Feet World Tour" was canceled due to the near fatal accident. The VHS contains mostly footage from the concert in Rotterdam Ahoy, along with footage taken throughout the course of the tour. The setlist for the tour was: 1. Get On Your Feet 2. Oye Mi Canto (Hear My Voice)2 3. What Goes Around 4. Remember Me With Love 5. Here We Are 6. Live For Loving You 7. A Song For Gloria (By the background singers) 8. Sex in The 90's1 9. MSM Medley (Played at the Latin American shows)1 - Dingui-Li Bangui - A Toda Maquina - Baila Conmigo 10. Ballad Medley: - Anything For You2 - Words Get in the Way2 - Can't Stay Away From You - Renacer - No Sera Facil - Regresa a Mí - Cuts Both Ways - Can't Forget You 1 - Don't Wanna Lose You 2 11. Alma Llanera (Played at Select shows) 1 12. Dr. Beat 1 13. 1-2-3 14. Nayib's Song (I Am Here For You) 15. Close My Eyes 16. Mama Yo Can't Go 1 17. Seal Our Fate 18. Conga 19. Rhythm Is Gonna Get You 20. Coming Out of The Dark 2; 1 Only performed in select shows 2Songs were performed in their Spanish versions in select shows The tour was made to promote the album Into The Light.
1996–1997	Evolution World Tour	July 13, 1996–May 3, 1997 (Worldwide)	108	VHS, LaserDisc
This tour became the most successful and most ambitious tour of Estefan, making stops in every continent of the world including the most important cities of each one. With it, Estefan visited South Africa and Hawaii for the first time. The tour was made to promote the album Destiny. With 108 stops with sold-out stages, it was the most successful tour ever for a Latin artist, and it is also the most successful tour of Estefan to date. One of the concerts in the Miami Arena was filmed for an HBO broadcast and a subsequent VHS/DVD release. The setlist for the tour was: 1. Conga 2. Live For Loving You 3. Get On Your Feet 4. Anything For You 5. Don't Wanna Lose You 6. Destiny 7. Here We Are 8. Rhythm Is Gonna Get You 9. Oye Mi Canto 10. Steal Your Heart/No Pretendo 11. Along Came You (A Song For Emily) 12. Mi Tierra 13. Con Los Años Que Me Quedan 14. Montuno 15. Tradición 16. Everlasting Love 17. Ballad Medley - Cuts Both Ways - I See Your Smile - Words Get in the Way - Can't Stay Away From You 18. Always Tomorrow 19. Coming Out of The Dark 20. Abriendo Puertas 21. You'll Be Mine (Party Time) 22. Turn The Beat Around 23. Megamix 24. Higher 25. Tres Deseos 26. Reach / Puedas Llegar; In some shows, Gloria performed some of her hits in Spanish. The following songs were also performed in selected shows: I'm Not Giving You Up - Show Me The Way Back To Your Heart - Ayer - Volver
2004	Live & Re-Wrapped Tour	2004 (U.S.)	26	Unreleased
A tour made to promote the album Unwrapped, was Estefan's first tour since 1996, which followed special concert shows at Las Vegas "Caesars Palace" called "Live & Unwrapped," which was released on DVD. Not to be confused with the Las Vegas shows, the "Live & Re-Wrapped" Tour was never officially released on home video and the show and track listing were very different.
2008–2009	90 Millas World Tour	2008 – 2009 (Europe, Latin America, U.S.)	35	Unreleased
A tour created to promote Estefan's album 90 Millas, is the first tour made for a Spanish language album and is Estefan's first tour in Europe in twelve years. The tour began in Valencia on August 22, with other European performances taking place in Rotterdam, London, Belfast Madrid, Zaragoza, and Barcelona. Estefan finished the tour with one single show in Latin America where she performed at the Aruba Music Festival on October 11, 2008. A second leg was added to this tour in which Gloria went for the first time to some Latin-American countries, the tour went to Punta Del Este, Uruguay, Santiago, Chile, Buenos Aires, Lima and Guayaquil, Ecuador. Then, the tour added more dates to the schedule, and now three-dates are scheduled for the Memorial Day Weekend at the Foxwoods Resort Casino, as part of a special concert with Carole King named "She's Got A Friend". Another three dates were added to some performances at Europe for some music festivals at: Milan, Locarno, Liverpool, Monte Carlo and Istanbul. And a free-performance at Guadalajara, Mexico for a music festival to promote tourism in Mexico after the Swine influenza.

== Notable concerts ==
- Vh1 Divas Live
- The Millennium Concert (December 31, 1999, American Airlines Arena, Miami, Florida)
- The Atlantis Concert (April 19, 2000, Atlantis Paradise Island Hotel Resort, Nassau, Bahamas)
- One Night Only (November 4, 2001, Mandalay Bay, Las Vegas, Nevada, USA)
- One Night Only (November 11, 2001, Mohegan Sun, Uncasville, Connecticut, USA)
- Live & Unwrapped (October 2003, The Colosseum at Caesars Palace, Las Vegas, Nevada, USA)
- She's Got a Friend (With Carole King)
