= Destiny (Gloria Estefan album) =

Studio album by Gloria Estefan
- Released: June 4, 1996
- Studios: Crescent Moon Studios (Miami); Criteria Studios (Miami); Gettings Studio (Ocoee); The Power Station (New York City); Right Track Recording (New York City)
- Genres: Pop; tropical
- Length: 49:17
- Label: Epic
- Producer: Emilio Estefan Jr.

Gloria Estefan chronology
Abriendo Puertas (1995)	Destiny (1996)	Best of Gloria Estefan (1997)

Singles from Destiny
- 1. "Reach" Released: April 1996; 2. "You'll Be Mine (Party Time)" Released: August 1996; 3. "I'm Not Giving You Up" / "Higher" Released: November 1996; 4. "No Pretendo" Released: July 1997

Professional ratings
Review scores
Source	Rating
AllMusic	3/5 stars
Billboard	(favorable)
Cash Box	(favorable)
Entertainment Weekly	B−
The Guardian	3/5 stars
Los Angeles Times	2.5/4 stars
Smash Hits	2/5 stars

Destiny is the seventh studio solo album released by Cuban-American singer Gloria Estefan, but is the nineteenth of her career overall. It shipped 1.6 million copies worldwide in its first month of release.

== Production and release ==
The album features a more ambient sound than previous Estefan albums, with only two songs, "You'll Be Mine (Party Time)" and "Higher", being upbeat. The album includes a bonus enhanced selection, in which Estefan talks about the album and the song "Reach" in particular. It also features an animated discography of Estefan.

The first single from the album, "Reach", became a hit around the world and was the official theme of the 1996 Summer Olympics in Atlanta.

On July 26, 2024, the album was reissued on 'crystal clear' 180-gram vinyl in a limited edition of 1000 individually numbered copies.

== Commercial performance ==
The album placed at #116 on the Billboard Year-End chart and as of 2005 it has sold 877,000 copies in United States according to Nielsen Soundscan. According to Billboard, It was one of Sony Music's best selling records in the first quarter revenue of 1996, selling over 1.6 million copies worldwide.

== Track listing ==
Standard release track listing
No.	Title	Writer(s)	Producer(s)	Length
1.	"Destiny"	Gloria Estefan; Emilio Estefan Jr.; Lawrence Dermer; Diane Warren	E. Estefan; Dermer	5:13
2.	"I'm Not Giving You Up"	G. Estefan; Kike Santander	E. Estefan; Santander	4:20
3.	"Steal Your Heart"	G. Estefan; Santander	E. Estefan; Santander	3:47
4.	"The Heart Never Learns"	Jorge Casas; Dermer	E. Estefan; Casas; Dermer	4:32
5.	"You'll Be Mine (Party Time)"	E. Estefan; Dermer; Clay Ostwald	E. Estefan; Dermer; Ostwald	4:50
6.	"Path of the Right Love"	G. Estefan	E. Estefan; Casas; Ostwald	5:20
7.	"Show Me the Way Back to Your Heart"	Warren	E. Estefan; Dermer	3:57
8.	"Along Came You (A Song for Emily)"	G. Estefan	E. Estefan; Casas; Dermer	6:18
9.	"Higher"	Dermer	E. Estefan; Dermer	3:49
10.	"I Know You Too Well"	G. Estefan; Warren	E. Estefan; Santander	4:55
11.	"Reach"	G. Estefan; Warren	E. Estefan; Dermer	3:49
Total length:				49:17

North American Enhanced CD includes various interviews and video clips.

Brazilian, Colombian, and Mexican release bonus track
No.	Title	Writer(s)	Producer(s)	Length
12.	"No Pretendo" (Steal Your Heart – Spanish version)	Santander	E. Estefan; Santander	3:47
Total length:				54:38

Japanese release bonus track
No.	Title	Writer(s)	Producer(s)	Length
12.	"Reach" (Gold Medal Single Edit)	G. Estefan; Warren	E. Estefan; Dermer; Pablo Flores; Javier Garza	4:43

Australian Limited Tour Edition bonus disc [483932 9]
No.	Title	Writer(s)	Producer(s)	Length
1.	"Reach" (Gold Medal Mix)	G. Estefan; Warren	E. Estefan; Dermer; Flores; Garza	6:46
2.	"Destiny" (Live from the 1996 "Evolution" World Tour)	G. Estefan; E. Estefan; Dermer; Warren		5:22
3.	"Ballad Medley (Live from the 1996 "Evolution" World Tour)" (Cuts Both Ways / I See Your Smile / Words Get In The Way / Can't Stay Away From You)	G. Estefan; Jon Secada; Miguel A. Morejon		7:12
4.	"I'm Not Giving You Up" (Single Remix)	G. Estefan; Santander	E. Estefan; Santander; Tony Moran	4:08
5.	"Turn The Beat Around" (Live from the 1996 "Evolution" World Tour)	Peter Jackson; Gerald Jackson		4:52

1997 European CD reissue [EPC 483932 5] and 2000 Spain CD reissue [EPC 483932 0]
No.	Title	Writer(s)	Producer(s)	Length
1.	"No Pretendo"	Santander	E. Estefan; Santander	3:47
2.	"Destiny"	G. Estefan; E. Estefan; Dermer; Warren	E. Estefan; Dermer	5:13
3.	"I'm Not Giving You Up"	G. Estefan; Santander	E. Estefan; Santander	4:20
4.	"Steal Your Heart"	G. Estefan; Santander	E. Estefan; Santander	3:47
5.	"The Heart Never Learns"	Casas; Dermer	E. Estefan; Casas; Dermer	4:32
6.	"You'll Be Mine (Party Time)"	E. Estefan; Dermer; Clay Ostwald	E. Estefan; Dermer; Ostwald	4:50
7.	"Path of the Right Love"	G. Estefan	E. Estefan; Casas; Ostwald	5:20
8.	"Show Me the Way Back to Your Heart"	Warren	E. Estefan; Dermer	3:57
9.	"Along Came You (A Song for Emily)"	G. Estefan	E. Estefan; Casas; Dermer	6:18
10.	"Higher"	Dermer	E. Estefan; Dermer	3:49
11.	"I Know You Too Well"	G. Estefan; Warren	E. Estefan; Santander	4:55
12.	"Reach"	G. Estefan; Warren	E. Estefan; Dermer	3:49
Total length:				54:44

== Personnel ==
- Davnda Afaolbi – vocals
- Davonda Afolabi – choir
- Gloria Agostini – harp
- Donna Allen – vocals (background)
- Marcelo Anez – engineer
- Julien Barber – viola
- Diane Barere – cello
- Elena Barere – violin
- Randy Barlow – trumpet
- Mike Bassie – rap
- John Beale – violin
- Carol Becker – vocals
- Joseph Bongiorno – bass
- Edwin Bonilla – percussion
- Francisco Anthony Del – drum programming
- April Brown – violin
- Avril Brown – violin
- Ed Calle – saxophone
- Jorge Casas – bass, guitar, arranger, producer, chant, mandocello, tres, orchestration, production coordination, muted banjo
- Sean Chambers – engineer
- David Chappell – strings
- Huifang Chen – strings
- Charles Christopher – vocals (background)
- Tony Concepcion – trumpet
- Mike Couzzi – engineer
- Sal Cuevas – bass
- Matt Curry – assistant
- Jill Dell'Abate – contractor
- Lawrence Dermer – guitar, percussion, piano, arranger, keyboards, organ (hammond), vocals (background), producer, bata, fender rhodes, horn arrangements, string arrangements
- Sharon Diacheysn – vocals
- John DiPuccio – strings
- Nancy Donald – art direction
- Charles Dye – engineer
- Emilio Estefan, Jr. – arranger, producer, executive producer
- Gloria Estefan – arranger, vocals (background)
- Mary Helen Ewing – viola
- Joan Faigen – strings
- Chembo Febles – percussion, percussion (African), chant
- John Feeney – violin
- Guillermo Figueroa – violin
- Narcisco Figueroa – violin
- Guillermo Figueron – violin
- Barry Finclair – bass, violin
- Shaun Fisher – vocals
- Pablo Flores – mixing
- Cecelia Hobbs Gardner – violin
- Crystal Garner – viola
- Hector Garrido – conductor, director, organ (hammond), orchestration
- Javier Garza – engineer
- Andy Goldman – guitar
- Paolo Gualano – percussion, drums, surdo, drums (snare)
- Joyce Hammann – violin
- Kate Harrington – hair stylist
- Kris Kello – arranger, keyboards, vocals (background)
- Bakithi Khumalo – bass, chant
- Sebastián Krys – engineer
- Phil Lakofsky – strings, cello
- Carol Landon – viola
- Jeanne LeBlanc – cello
- Charles Libove – violin
- Mei Mei Lin – strings
- Richard Locker – cello
- Daniel Lopez – percussion, handclapping
- Dante Luciani – trombone
- Bob Ludwig – mastering
- Juan R. Marquez – classic guitar
- Nancy McAlhany – violin
- Andrew Melick – photography
- Rick Melverne – vocals
- Homer Mensch – bass
- Heidi Modr – violin
- Sarah Moore – vocals
- Richard Morris – vocals
- Rick Morris – choir
- Doug Mountain – digital mixing
- Eugene J. Moye – cello
- Jan Mullen – violin
- Craig Mumm – viola
- David Nadien – violin
- Jorge Noriega – vocals (background)
- Mario Ochoa – percussion
- Alfredo Oliva – strings
- Gene Orloff – violin
- Clay Ostwald – arranger, keyboards, producer, chant
- Caryl Paisner – cello
- Sandra Park – violin
- Paul Peabody – violin
- Scott Perry – engineer
- Freddy Piñero, Jr. – programming, engineer, assistant
- John Pintavalle – violin
- Cheito Quinonez – vocals (background), guiro
- Serena Radaelli – hair stylist
- Dave Reitzas – engineer, mixing
- Herb Ritts – photography
- Robert Rozek – strings
- Kike Santander – bass, guitar, percussion, arranger, keyboards, handclapping, producer, horn arrangements, vocal effect
- Mike Scaglione – saxophone
- Eric Schilling – engineer
- Mark Orrin Schuman – cello
- Laura Seaton – violin
- Richard Sortomme – violin
- Debbie Spring – viola
- Steve Svensson – strings
- Marti Sweet – bass
- Ron Taylor – engineer
- Ron Taylor – engineer
- Dana Teboe – trombone
- Donna Tecco – violin
- Rene Toledo – guitar
- Alberto Tolot – photography
- Francesca Tolot – make-up
- Michelle Vandenbos – choir
- Deborah Waknin – hair stylist
- Ellen Westerman – cello
- Eric Wyric – violin
- Joe Zeytoonian – saz, oud

== Charts ==
=== Weekly charts ===
Chart (1996)	Peak position
Australian Albums (ARIA)	13
Austrian Albums (Ö3 Austria)	24
Belgian Albums (Ultratop Flanders)	47
Belgian Albums (Ultratop Wallonia)	20
Canada Albums (RPM)	29
Dutch Albums (Album Top 100)	17
European Albums (Music & Media)	14
Finnish Albums (Suomen virallinen lista)	34
French Albums (SNEP)	56
German Albums (Offizielle Top 100)	35
Hungarian Albums (MAHASZ)	17
Norwegian Albums (VG-lista)	10
Portuguese Albums (AFP)	10
Spanish Albums (Promusicae)	5
Swedish Albums (Sverigetopplistan)	57
Swiss Albums (Schweizer Hitparade)	15
UK Albums (Official Charts)	12
US Billboard 200	23

=== Year-end charts ===
Chart (1996)	Position
US Billboard 200	116

== Certifications and sales ==
Region	Certification	Certified units/sales
Argentina (CAPIF)	Gold	30,000^{^}
Australia (ARIA)	Gold	35,000^{^}
Canada (Music Canada)	Gold	50,000^{^}
Japan (RIAJ)	Gold	100,000^{^}
Spain (Promusicae)	2× Platinum	200,000^{^}
United Kingdom (BPI)	Silver	60,000^{^}
United States (RIAA)	Platinum	1,000,000^{^}
^{^} Shipments figures based on certification alone.

== Release history ==
Region	Date
U.S.	June 4, 1996
Canada	June 4, 1996
Europe, Latin America & Asia	June 3, 1996
Japan	May 30, 1996
Europe (Reissue EPC 483932 5)	June 23, 1997
