= Tres Deseos =

Single by Gloria Estefan

from the album Abriendo Puertas
- Released: January 1996
- Recorded: 1994–1995
- Genre: Merengue; salsa
- Length: 3:32
- Label: Epic
- Songwriters: Kike Santander; Enrique Flavio

Gloria Estefan singles chronology
"Más Allá" (1995/1996)	"Tres Deseos" (1996)	"Dulce Amor" (1996)

"Tres Deseos" (in English: Three Wishes) is a merengue and salsa song by Cuban American singer-songwriter Gloria Estefan, released in January 1996 by Epic Records as a promotional single from her second Spanish-language album, Abriendo Puertas (1995). It was written by Kike Santander and Enrique Flavio. An upbeat Latin dance song, it was also the first promotional single released worldwide from the album. In Japan, it was released as a CD maxi single. Remixes were produced by Rosabel, and with their help the song successfully made it to number one on the US Billboard Hot Dance Music/Club Play chart. It become popular at Estefan's concerts as a medley with her song "Higher" from the album Destiny.

== Critical reception ==
Larry Flick from Billboard magazine wrote, "Latest offering from La Gloria's oh-so-fab Abriendo Puertas opus features the singer gingerly vamping and chanting over a percolating Latin-house groove. Club DJs are given a wealth of fine remixes to choose from, ranging from Ralphi Rosario and Abel Aguilera's stompin' tribal-house versions to Pablo Flores and Javier Garza's more traditional tropical mixes. Regardless of your choice, you get an ample dose of Estefan's loose, fun performance and a tune built on a tightly constructed melody. Simply put, ya can't lose with this one!"

Chuck Campbell from Knoxville News Sentinel remarked the "hyper-complex melody lines" of "Tres Deseos". Pan-European magazine Music & Media named it "one of the more 'latin' tracks" of the Abriendo Puertas album, "which has Estefan exploring her origins, while not forgetting her international pop status." They added further that "Tres Deseos" "is 100 percent pure undiluted salsa, just like the extra track, a traditional son called 'Farolito'. It's sheer pleasure to hear Estefan indulge herself in her Cuban roots." Gerald Martinez from New Sunday Times described it as "lively merengue", noting that the song features "wonderfully complex horn parts, driving percussion and engaging vocals."

== Usage in media ==
In 1998, the song was featured on the soundtrack for the film Dance with Me, which also featured Estefan's single Heaven's What I Feel.

In the seventh season of the American television program Dancing with the Stars; actress Cloris Leachman used the song on the fifth night of the competition.

== Formats and track listings ==
These are the formats and track listings of major single releases of Tres Deseos.

- US CD 12" Vinyl Single (EAS 7798)
1. "Tres Deseos" (Album Version) (03:32)
2. "Tres Deseos" (Pablo Flores 12" Mix) (06:35)
3. "Tres Deseos" (Rosabel's Fiesta Mix) (07:29)
4. "Tres Deseos" (Rosabel's Percapella Beats) (05:45)
5. "Tres Deseos" (Rosabel's The Three Wish Dub) (07:15)
6. "Tres Deseos" (Rosabel's Tribe Dub) (07:57)
7. "Tres Deseos" (Rosabel's The Under Dub) (05:30)
8. "Tres Deseos" (Rosabel's Bonus Wish Mix) (04:06)
9. "Tres Deseos" (Rosabel's Tragic Dub) (08:08)
10. "Tres Deseos" (Rosabel's The More Tragic Dub) (08:15)

== Official versions ==
Original versions

1. Album version — 3:32

Pablo Flores & Javier Garza Remixes

1. 12" Remix - 6:41
2. 12" Remix Edit — 5:00

Rosabel (Ralphi Rosario & Abel Aguilera) Remixes

1. Rosabel's Fiesta Mix — 7:29
2. Rosabel's Tragic Dub — 8:08
3. Rosabel's The Three Wish Dub — 7:15
4. Rosabel's Tribe Dub — 7:57
5. Rosabel's The More Tragic Dub — 8:15
6. Rosabel's The Under Dub — 5:30
7. Rosabel's Bonus Wish Mix — 4:06
8. Rosabel's Percapella Beats — 5:45

== Release history ==
Region	Date
United States	January 1996
Japan	January 25, 1996

== Charts ==
Chart (1996)	Peak position
US Hot Dance Club Songs (Billboard)	1
US Top Latin Songs (Billboard)	12
US Hot Latin Pop Airplay (Billboard)	14
US Hot Latin Tropical/Salsa Airplay (Billboard)	14
