= Love to Infinity =

British remix, production, and songwriting team

- Origin: Manchester, England
- Genres: Hip hop; house; dance
- Years active: 1992–present
- Labels: All Around the World, Mushroom Records UK, JPS Productions

Love to Infinity are Grammy nominated, multi platinum , UK-based remix, production and songwriting team of brothers Andy Lee, Pete Lee and Dave Lee.

As the duo of Andy and Pete Lee, they also later operated under the pseudonyms Caramel (a cover of Pebbles' "Girlfriend" was a No. 9 UK Dance hit), M*A*S*H, Soda Club (featuring singer Ashley Jade) and Urban North. They remixed Aretha Franklin's "A Rose Is Still a Rose", and the track went on to sell more than 500,000 copies in the US and top the Hot Dance Club Play chart.

Formed in 1992, they have produced and remixed for a wealth of dance and pop artists including Madonna, Michael Jackson, Cher, Diana Ross, Aretha Franklin, Gloria Estefan, Ace of Base, Whitney Houston, Myra, Loleatta Holloway, Celine Dion, Shania Twain, Grace Jones, Will Smith, Pet Shop Boys, Erasure, the Who, Pulp, All Saints, Simply Red, Take That, Aqua, Robbie Williams, Melanie Williams, Barbra Streisand, Milk Inc, N-Trance, Kristine W, Rozalla and Faith Hill.

Also an act in their own right, Love to Infinity joined forces with the vocalist Kelly Llorenna, to release a version of one of their mid-1990s US Billboard Hot Dance Club Play chart-toppers, "Keep Love Together" on the All Around the World Productions label.

== Career ==
In the mid-1990s, Love to Infinity regularly performed at Manchester's Hacienda night club notching up twelve appearances in one year around the time of their first top 40 hit, "Keep Love Together" (1995) as well as numerous tours with Ministry of Sound. As an act, they were fronted by singer Louise Bailey, and in 1998, a double album, Classic Paradise, was released in Japan, which included all of their singles and remixes. Starting with Melanie Williams, who had a hit with Sub Sub, "Ain't No Love (Ain't No Use)", LTI took her first solo track "All Cried Out" and turned it into a disco/salsoul revival. This early success led to another collaboration, "Not Enough", which became a firm favorite of Junior Vasquez at the Sound Factory, New York City, and also topped the DMC Club Chart. The first production released however, was the single "Saviour" on Big Life Records in 1993, featuring singer Louise Bailey. This was followed by "Somethin' Outta Nothin'" on the underground imprint Pigeon Pie.

Love to Infinity's productions for other artists include Myra, Jennifer Holliday, Judy Cheeks, Rozalla, Atomic Kitten, Speedway, Dannii Minogue, Matthew Marsden and Destiny's Child.

== Chart singles ==
- "Keep Love Together" (1995) – UK No. 38
- "Someday" (1995) – UK No. 75
- "Pray for Love" (1996) – UK No. 69
