= You'll Be Mine (Party Time) =

Single by Gloria Estefan

from the album Destiny
- Released: August 5, 1996
- Recorded: 1995–1996
- Genre: Latin pop; dance-pop
- Length: 4:50
- Label: Epic
- Songwriters: Emilio Estefan, Jr.; Lawrence Dermer; Clay Ostwald
- Producers: Emilio Estefan, Jr.; Lawrence Dermer; Clay Ostwald

Gloria Estefan singles chronology
"Reach" (1996)	"You'll Be Mine (Party Time)" (1996)	"I'm Not Giving You Up" / "Higher" (1996)

Music video
- "You'll Be Mine (Party Time)" on YouTube

Audio sample
- Gloria Estefan - "You'll Be Mine (Party Time)": file; help

"You'll Be Mine (Party Time)" is a song by Cuban American singer and songwriter Gloria Estefan. It was released in August 1996, by Epic Records, as the follow-up to "Reach" and the second single from her seventh studio album, Destiny (1996). The song, written and produced by Estefan's husband Emilio Estefan, Jr. with Lawrence Dermer and Clay Ostwald, became one of Estefan's most popular songs. Since its appearance, the song has been present on all the tours of Gloria Estefan as it remains a favorite among fans. In the UK the Classic Paradise radio mix by Love To Infinity was the preferred version played by radio stations including Radio 1. The single was a top-20 hit in Finland, France, Scotland, Spain and the United Kingdom. In France it was released twice; at its first release, it peaked at number 15, but at the second release the song peaked at number 17.

Estefan and Stevie Wonder collaborated for a special performance of this song at the Super Bowl XXXIII Halftime Show in 1999, the performance received a strong ovation and gave the two singers a boost on sales in the albums the two singers were promoting at that time.

== Critical reception ==
AllMusic editor Jon O'Brien wrote, "The Caribbean-flavored 'You'll Be Mine', later sampled in Will Smith's 'Miami', is an effortlessly uplifting party track." Larry Flick from Billboard magazine described it as a "lively, latin-spiked ditty" and a "jiggly revisitation of La Glo's 'Conga' era". He added that "this cut is actually better described as a savvy progression of the sound she and the Miami Sound Machine mined", complimenting Estefan who "has rarely sounded more playful, as evident in the gingerly way she surfs atop the track's rushing waves of percussion and horns." Later on the album release, the magazine also named it a "festive street-party anthem". The Daily Vault's Mark Millan called it "one of Gloria's best dance numbers", with "latin beats and sexy horns". He also noted that it "add much needed light into what is a very mood-driven and introspective collection of songs."

Damien Mendis from Music Week's RM Dance Update gave the song a full score of five out of five, stating that the "LTI's Classic Paradise mix is a faultless typically expert, jumpily striding affair that screams HIT ALERT." People Magazine wrote that "her sensual vocal style works best when it rides a firecracker groove." The reviewer added that "when she gets wild and frisky in the calypso swing of 'You'll Be Mine (Party Time)' then Estefan "can even get a grandma leaping from her rocking chair and dancing into the streets." Bob Waliszewski of Plugged In found that it "rejoices in life and love". Fernando Gonzales from Star-News named it a "good-time romp".

== Charts ==
Chart (1996)	Peak position
Australia (ARIA)	118
Estonia (Eesti Top 20)	10
Europe (Eurochart Hot 100)	64
Finland (Suomen virallinen lista)	20
France (SNEP)	15
France (SNEP) (re-release)	17
Germany (GfK)	84
Iceland (Íslenski Listinn Topp 40)	24
Italy Airplay (Music & Media)	8
Netherlands (Dutch Top 40 Tipparade)	6
Netherlands (Dutch Single Tip)	8
Scotland (OCC)	18
Spain (AFYVE)	18
Sweden (Sverigetopplistan)	36
UK Singles (OCC)	18
UK Airplay (Music Week)	30
US Billboard Hot 100	70
US Hot Singles Sales (Billboard)	64
US Hot Dance Club Play (Billboard)	2
US Hot Dance Music/Maxi-Singles Sales (Billboard)	14
US Cash Box Top 100	70
