= Mi Tierra (song) =

Single by Gloria Estefan

from the album Mi Tierra
- Released: 1993
- Studio: Crescent Moon Studios, Miami, Florida
- Genre: Son montuno
- Length: 4:38
- Label: Epic
- Songwriters: Estéfano; Gloria Estefan
- Producers: Emilio Estefan Jr.; Jorge Casas; Clay Ostwald

Gloria Estefan singles chronology
| "Go Away" (1993) | "Mi Tierra" (1993) | "Con Los Años Que Me Quedan" (1993) |

Music video
- "Mi Tierra" on YouTube

"Mi Tierra" (transl. "My Homeland") is a song by Cuban American singer and songwriter Gloria Estefan, from her third studio album of the same name (1993). It was written by Estefano and the artist, with her husband Emilio Estefan, Jorge Casas, and Clay Ostwald handling the production. The song was released as the lead single from the album in 1993 by Epic Records. It is a son montuno track in which the singer narrates longing for her homeland. The song received positive reactions from music critics, who praised its arrangement.

"Mi Tierra" received the Lo Nuestro Award for Tropical Song of the Year in 1994, Tropical/Salsa Song of the Year at the 1994 Billboard Latin Music Awards, and was acknowledged as an award-winning song at the 1995 BMI Latin Awards. Commercially, the song topped the Billboard Hot Latin Songs chart in the United States and ranked on several European countries' listings. The accompanying music video was directed by Alberto Tolot and features Gloria Estefan performing the song along with several musicians in the background. The song has been covered live by Ednita Nazario, Víctor Manuelle, and Emily Estefan, respectively.

== Background and composition ==
In January 1993, Gloria Estefan announced that she was working on a Spanish-language album titled Mi Tierra. The artist had wanted to record a Spanish-language album reflecting her Cuban heritage since the beginning of her musical career. Before recording in English, Estefan and her band performed at Latin nightclubs; she also remembered her grandmother teaching her old Cuban songs. Music had an important role in Estefan's family; her paternal grandmother was a poet, and an uncle played the flute in a salsa band. The singer's desire to record an album in Spanish was also influenced by her son Nayib; she wanted him to recognize his Cuban heritage.

Mi Tierra was produced by Gloria's husband, Emilio Estefan, and fellow Miami Sound Machine members Clay Ostwald and Jorge Casas. Recording took place at the Crescent Moon Studios in Miami, Florida. Colombian musician Estefano composed four of the album's songs, including the title track, which he co-wrote with Estefan. Musically, "Mi Tierra" is a "straightforward hard-montuno strut celebrating love and longing for the old country". Estefan noted that the song could apply to any immigrant, "the song wasn't just for a Cuban", citing Estefano's Colombian origin. "[S]o for him it meant something else. We wanted something that could catch the feeling of nostalgia felt by every Hispanic immigrant, no matter where he comes from", she added.

== Critical reception and accolades ==
AllMusic editor Jose F. Promis called the song as "anthemic" and referred to it as one of the album's "happy upbeat songs". Larry Flick from Billboard magazine called the song "genius". Of the club remix, he said it is "effectively reconstructed for her newly rediscovered club following. Track tempers the original song's kinetic percussion and Glo's fierce singing with a wriggling deep-house groove and ambient keyboards." The Daily Vault's Mark Millan called the song "intoxicating". Anne Hurley from Entertainment Weekly stated that "moods flow from intense yearning" and it is a "meditation on longing for one's homeland". The Miami Herald reviewer Mario Tarradell felt that Estefan "rips through the fierce beat of the title track". In an otherwise negative review of the album, "Mi Tierra" was the only track that The Morning Call critic Clarence Elie-Rivera enjoyed, calling it an "upbeat dance tune".

Chuck Campbell of the Knoxville News Sentinel called "Mi Tierra" a "poignant" song that gives a "provocative look at the Cuban motherland from an expatriate standpoint". In his weekly UK chart commentary, James Masterton noted, "It is the first time she has ever charted a single sung in Spanish, which may restrict its appeal somewhat." Alan Jones from Music Week gave the song three out of five stars, adding that "the older occasional singles buyer will be lured to this by its traditional Latin-drenched original mix, while dance fans will skip it for Tommy Musto and Pablo Flores' muscular house mixes. Regular Estefan fans are more likely to give it a miss altogether." The Pittsburgh Post-Gazette critic Betsy Kline referred it as one of the album's three best tracks. Tim Jeffery from the Record Mirror Dance Update described the song as "a nice summery Latin number".

At the 6th Annual Lo Nuestro Awards in 1994, "Mi Tierra" won Tropical Song of the Year. In the same year, it was the Tropical/Salsa Song of the Year at the inaugural Billboard Latin Music Awards. The song was acknowledged as an award-winning song at the 1995 BMI Latin Awards.

== Promotion and commercial performance ==
"Mi Tierra" was as released as the album's lead single in 1993 by Epic Records. The accompanying music video was directed by Alberto Tolot and features Estefan performing the song in a nightclub along with several musicians in the background. A re-recording of the song was included on her 14th studio album Brazil305 (2020) and incorporates Brazilian music. Estefan performed the track live at the 36th Annual Grammy Awards in 1994, where she also won the Grammy Award for Best Tropical Latin Album for Mi Tierra.

As part of the Latin Recording Academy tribute to Estefan, who was presented with the Person of the Year accolade in 2008, Puerto Rican singer Ednita Nazario sung a live cover version of "Mi Tierra". On the following day, Estefan performed it on the 9th Annual Latin Grammy Awards ceremony along with "No Llores" and "Oye Mi Canto". Ten years later, she was honored with the Lo Nuestro Excellence Award by Univision along with her husband and the track was performed by Puerto Rican singer Víctor Manuelle during the 2018 Lo Nuestro Awards.

In the United States, the song reached numbers one and five on the Billboard Hot Latin Songs and the Hot Dance Club Songs charts, respectively. "Mi Tierra" was the second best-performing Latin song in the country after "Me Estoy Enamorando" by La Mafia. In Europe, the song peaked at number 77 on the Media Control charts in Germany, 27th on the Mega Single Top 100 chart in the Netherlands, and 36th on the UK Singles Chart.

== Track listing ==
- CD-Maxi single
1. Mi Tierra (album version) – 4:36
2. Mi Tierra (Flores Latin House Dub) – 4:08
3. Mi Tierra (Latin Mix) – 6:15
4. Mi Tierra (Underground Vocal) – 5:40
5. Mi Tierra (Flores Latin House Mix) – 6:39

== Personnel ==
Adapted from the Mi Tierra liner notes:

- Randy Barlow – music arranger, trumpet, backing vocalist
- Cachao – double bass
- Jorge Casas – tres, twelve-string guitar
- Sheila E. – congas, timbales
- Luis Enrique – percussion
- Estefano – arranger
- Emilio Estefan Jr – arranger
- Nelson González – tres, percussion
- Paquito Hechavarría – piano
- Teddy Mulet – trumpet, trombone, backing vocalist
- Clay Ostwald – arranger, piano
- Rafael Padilla – percussion
- Debbie Spring – violin, viola
- Steven Sigurdson – cello
- Néstor Torres – flute
- Cheíto Quiñonez – backing vocalist

== Charts ==
=== Weekly charts ===
Chart performance for "Mi Tierra"
| Chart (1993) | Peak position |
|---|---|
| Australia (ARIA) | 183 |
| Germany (GfK) | 77 |
| Mexico (UPI) | 9 |
| Netherlands (Dutch Top 40) | 30 |
| Netherlands (Single Top 100) | 27 |
| Peru (UPI) | 1 |
| UK Singles (Official Charts) | 36 |
| UK Airplay (ERA) | 89 |
| UK Club Chart (Music Week) | 71 |
| US Dance Club Songs (Billboard) | 5 |
| US Hot Latin Songs (Billboard) | 1 |
| US Maxi-Singles Sales (Billboard) | 11 |

=== Year-end charts ===
1993 year-end chart performance for "Mi Tierra"
| Chart (1993) | Position |
|---|---|
| US Hot Latin Songs (Billboard) | 2 |

== See also ==
- List of number-one Billboard Hot Latin Tracks of 1993
