= Lawrence Dermer =

American songwriter (born 1962)

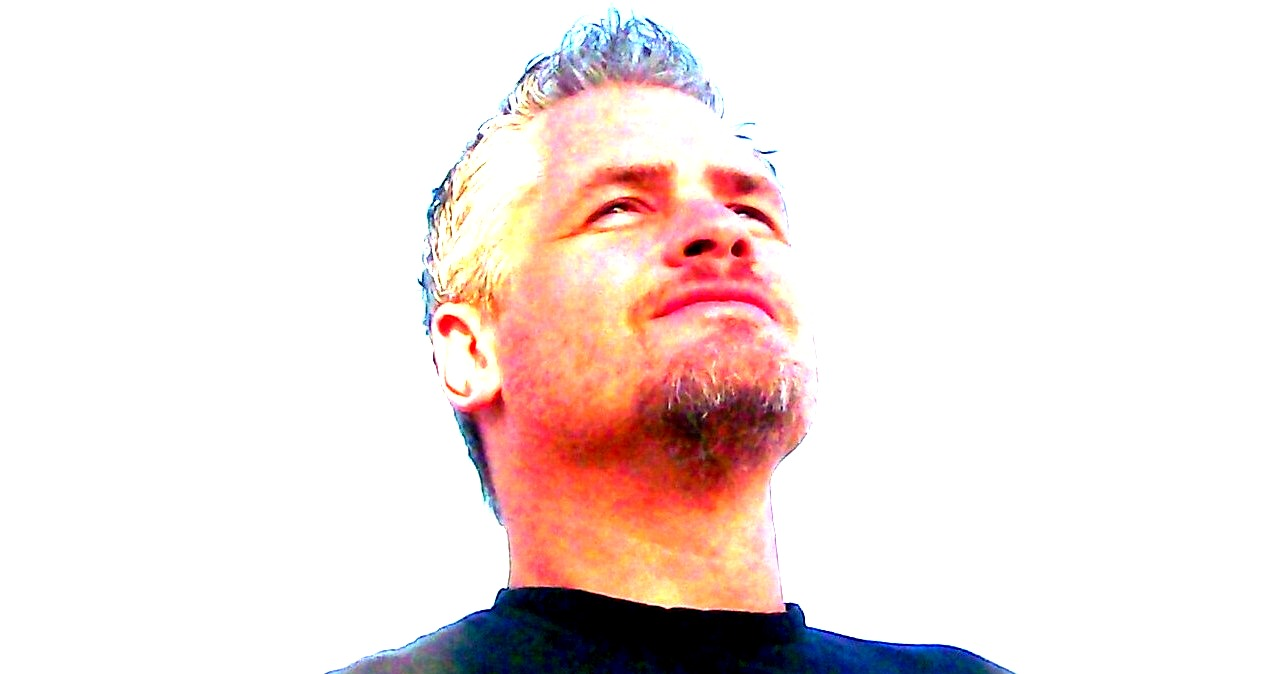

Background information
- Born: Lawrence Darmer; 1962 (age 63–64)
- Origin: Miami, Florida
- Genres: Dance-pop, Electronic, Dancehall
- Occupations: Composer, producer, arranger, musician, performer
- Instrument: Vocals

Lawrence Dermer is a Grammy-nominated and BMI award-winning record producer and songwriter. Dermer is best known for his work with Gloria Estefan and Miami Sound Machine.

== Discography ==
Other artists Dermer has worked include:

- Jennifer Lopez
- Madonna
- Cher
- Diddy
- Mase
- Busta Rhymes
- BB King
- Stephen Stills
- Jimmy Page
- Ted Nugent
- Thalía
- Ricky Martin
- Jon Secada

=== Soundtracks ===
Soundtracks Dermer has contributed to include:

- Evita
- The Specialist

=== Remixes ===
Dermer has created remixes for Will Smith and Lenny Kravitz.

== Live shows ==
Dermer has also produced live shows for Super Bowl XXIX (featuring Tony Bennett and Patti LaBelle) and Super Bowl XXXIII (with Stevie Wonder, Gloria Estefan, and Big Bad Voodoo Daddy), as well as a few Disney productions.
