= The Essential Gloria Estefan =

Greatest hits album by Gloria Estefan
- Released: October 3, 2006
- Genre: Pop
- Length: 152:46; 190:43 (2010 Limited Edition 3.0)
- Label: Epic; Legacy
- Producer: Emilio Estefan Jr.

Gloria Estefan chronology
The Very Best of Gloria Estefan (2006)	The Essential Gloria Estefan (2006)	90 Millas (2007)

Professional ratings
Review scores
Source	Rating
AllMusic	4.5/5 stars

The Essential Gloria Estefan is the seventh compilation album released by American singer Gloria Estefan, but is the twenty-eighth album overall, released in 2006. It is part of Sony BMG's The Essential series.

The album included a special bonus interview by Internet, in which Estefan talks about every song of the album.

On August 31, 2010, the album was reissued with a bonus disc and retitled "Essential 3.0". The third (bonus) disc contains eight songs including a rare edited version of "Betcha Say That".

== Track listing ==
Disc 1
No.	Title	Writer(s)	Length
1.	"Dr. Beat" (from Eyes of Innocence, 1984)	Enrique Garcia	4:24
2.	"Rhythm Is Gonna Get You" (from Let It Loose, 1987)	Gloria Estefan & Enrique Garcia	3:57
3.	"Heaven's What I Feel" (radio edit) (from Gloria!, 1998)	Kike Santander	4:33
4.	"Everlasting Love" (Robert Knight cover) (from Hold Me, Thrill Me, Kiss Me, 1994)	Buzz Cason & Mac Gayden	4:01
5.	"You'll Be Mine (Party Time)" (Rosabel's Fiesta Edit) (from Destiny, 1996)	Emilio Estefan Jr., Lawrence Dermer & Clay Ostwald	3:34
6.	"Get On Your Feet" (from Cuts Both Ways, 1989)	John DeFaria, Jorge Casas & Clay Ostwald	3:39
7.	"Go Away" (remix) (from Greatest Hits, 1992)	Gloria Estefan & Lawrence Dermer	3:51
8.	"Don't Let This Moment End" (radio edit) from Gloria!)	Gloria Estefan, Emilio Estefan Jr., Lawrence Dermer & Robert Blades	4:10
9.	"No Me Dejes de Querer" (from Alma Caribeña, 2000)	Gloria Estefan, Emilio Estefan Jr. & Robert Blades	3:29
10.	"Bad Boy" (remix) (from Primitive Love, 1985)	Lawrence Dermer, Joe Galdo & Rafael Vigil	3:46
11.	"1-2-3" (remix) (from Let It Loose)	Gloria Estefan & Enrique Garcia	3:36
12.	"Oye Mi Canto (Hear My Voice)" (from Cuts Both Ways)	Gloria Estefan, Jorge Casas & Clay Ostwald	4:53
13.	"Live for Loving You" (remix) (from Into the Light, 1991)	Gloria Estefan, Emilio Estefan Jr. & Diane Warren	4:21
14.	"Sí Señor!..." (from Mi Tierra, 1993)	Juanito Marquez	4:40
15.	"Oye" (Pablo Flores English Remix Radio Edit) (from Gloria!)	Gloria Estefan, Emilio Estefan Jr., Randall Barlow & Angie Chirino	4:19
16.	"Turn the Beat Around" (Vicki Sue Robinson cover) (from Hold Me, Thrill Me, Kiss Me)	Pete Jackson & Gerald Jackson	3:53
17.	"Mi Tierra" (from Mi Tierra)	Estéfano, Estefan	4:39
18.	"Conga" (from Primitive Love)	Enrique Garcia	4:13
19.	"Doctor Pressure" (Mylo and Miami Sound Machine) (clean radio edit)	M. Macinnes & Enrique Garcia	3:24

Disc 2
No.	Title	Writer(s)	Length
1.	"Can't Stay Away from You" (from Let It Loose)	Gloria Estefan	3:59
2.	"Don't Wanna Lose You" (from Cuts Both Ways)	Gloria Estefan	4:09
3.	"Anything for You" (from Let It Loose)	Gloria Estefan	3:49
4.	"Falling in Love (Uh-Oh)" (from Primitive Love)	Lawrence Dermer, Joe Galdo & Rafael Vigil	3:57
5.	"Words Get in the Way" (from Primitive Love)	Gloria Estefan	3:28
6.	"Cuts Both Ways" (from Cuts Both Ways)	Gloria Estefan	3:16
7.	"Here We Are" (from Cuts Both Ways)	Gloria Estefan	4:51
8.	"If We Were Lovers" (from Mi Tierra)	Gloria Estefan & Emilio Estefan Jr.	4:38
9.	"Nayib's Song (I Am Here for You)" (from Into the Light)	Gloria Estefan	4:40
10.	"Reach" (from Destiny)	Gloria Estefan & Diane Warren	3:51
11.	"Music of My Heart" (with *NSYNC) (from Music of the Heart: The Album, 1999)	Gloria Estefan & Diane Warren	4:31
12.	"I See Your Smile" (from Greatest Hits)	Miguel A. Morejon & Jon Secada	4:36
13.	"I'm Not Giving You Up" (single edit) (from Destiny)	Gloria Estefan & Kike Santander	3:51
14.	"Wrapped" (from Unwrapped, 2003)	Gloria Estefan & Gian Marco	3:28
15.	"Hold Me, Thrill Me, Kiss Me" (Karen Chandler cover) (from Hold Me, Thrill Me, Kiss Me))	Harry Noble Jr.	3:23
16.	"Along Came You (A Song for Emily)" (from Destiny)	Gloria Estefan	6:21
17.	"Coming Out of the Dark" (from Into the Light)	Gloria Estefan, Emilio Estefan Jr. & Jon Secada	4:05
18.	"Always Tomorrow" (from Greatest Hits)	Gloria Estefan	4:54

Disc 3 (3.0 edition)
No.	Title	Writer(s)	Length
1.	"Betcha Say That" (single remix)	Lawrence Dermer, Joe Galdo & Rafael Vigil	3:42
2.	"Seal Our Fate"	Gloria Estefan	4:25
3.	"Can't Forget You"	Clay Ostwald, Jon Secada, & Jorge Casas	4:16
4.	"It's Too Late" (radio mix)	Carole King, Toni Stern	3:20
5.	"You Can't Walk Away from Love"	Gloria Estefan, & Emilio Estefan Jr	4:44
6.	"Out of Nowhere" (Thunderpuss club mix)	Emilio Estefan Jr, Randy Barlow, & Liza Quintana	8:56
7.	"Hoy" (salsa version)	Gian Marco Zignago	4:25
8.	"I Could Fall in Love"	Keith Thomas	4:26

== Chart positions ==
In Switzerland, the compilation entered at number ninety-nine, charting for a week. Later, the compilation charted within the Top 100 on the Dutch, Belgian and Italian charts.

Chart (2001)	Peak position
Belgian Albums (Ultratop Flanders)	81
Dutch Albums (Album Top 100)	63
Italian Albums (FIMI)	91
Swiss Albums (Schweizer Hitparade)	99
