= The Very Best of Gloria Estefan =

Compilation album by Gloria Estefan
- Released: September 26, 2006
- Genre: Pop
- Length: 73:11
- Label: Epic
- Producer: Emilio Estefan Jr.

Gloria Estefan chronology
Oye Mi Canto!: Los Grandes Exitos (2006)	The Very Best of Gloria Estefan (2006)	The Essential Gloria Estefan (2006)

The Very Best of Gloria Estefan is the sixth compilation album released by American singer Gloria Estefan, but is the twenty-seventh album overall, released in 2006.

== Track listing ==
The Very Best of Gloria Estefan track listing
No.	Title	Writer(s)	Length
1.	"Dr. Beat"	Enrique Garcia	4:24
2.	"Rhythm Is Gonna Get You"	Gloria Estefan & Enrique Garcia	3:57
3.	"Can't Stay Away from You"	Gloria Estefan	3:59
4.	"Hold Me, Thrill Me, Kiss Me"	Harry Noble Jr.	3:23
5.	"Heaven's What I Feel" (radio edit)	Kike Santander	4:33
6.	"Everlasting Love"	Buzz Cason & Mac Gayden	4:01
7.	"Don't Wanna Lose You"	Gloria Estefan	4:09
8.	"You'll Be Mine (Party Time)" (single mix)	Emilio Estefan Jr., Lawrence Dermer & Clay Ostwald	4:02
9.	"Get On Your Feet"	John DeFaria, Jorge Casas & Clay Ostwald	3:39
10.	"Reach"	Gloria Estefan & Diane Warren	3:51
11.	"Don't Let This Moment End" (radio edit)	Gloria Estefan, Emilio Estefan Jr., Lawrence Dermer & Robert Blades	4:10
12.	"Anything for You" (radio edit)	Gloria Estefan	3:49
13.	"Bad Boy" (remix)	Lawrence Dermer, Joe Galdo & Rafael Vigil	3:46
14.	"1-2-3" (remix)	Gloria Estefan & Enrique Garcia	3:36
15.	"Oye Mi Canto (Hear My Voice)" (edit)	Gloria Estefan, Jorge Casas & Clay Ostwald	4:07
16.	"Coming Out of the Dark"	Gloria Estefan, Emilio Estefan Jr. & Jon Secada	4:05
17.	"Wrapped"	Gloria Estefan & Gian Marco	3:28
18.	"Turn the Beat Around"	Pete Jackson & Gerald Jackson	3:53
19.	"Conga"	Enrique Garcia	4:13
20.	"Doctor Pressure" (Clean Radio Edit; Mylo vs. Miami Sound Machine; bonus track)	M. Macinnes & Enrique Garcia	3:24

== Chart positions ==
This compilation received a limited release, and made a performance at charts, only in the UK, Switzerland and Ireland.

Chart (2006)	Peak position
Danish Albums (Hitlisten)	40
Irish Albums (IRMA)	36
Scottish Albums (OCC)	39
Swiss Albums (Schweizer Hitparade)	99
UK Albums (OCC)	40

== Certifications ==
Region	Certification	Certified units/sales
Ireland (IRMA)	Gold	7,500^{^}
United Kingdom (BPI)	Gold	100,000^{^}
^{^} Shipments figures based on certification alone.
