= 1-2-3 (Gloria Estefan and Miami Sound Machine song) =

- Worldwide Single Cover

Single by Gloria Estefan and Miami Sound Machine

from the album Let It Loose / Anything for You
- Released: June 14, 1988
- Recorded: 1987
- Genre: Dance-pop
- Length: 3:28 (album version); 3:36 (7" remix)
- Label: Epic
- Songwriters: Gloria Estefan; Enrique Garcia
- Producers: Emilio & The Jerks

Gloria Estefan and Miami Sound Machine singles chronology
"Anything for You" (1988)	"1-2-3" (1988)	"Don't Wanna Lose You" (1989)

Music video
- "1-2-3" on YouTube

"1-2-3" (sometimes listed as "1, 2, 3") is a 1988 song by American singer and songwriter Gloria Estefan and the Miami Sound Machine. The song was written by the band's drummer and lead songwriter Enrique "Kiki" Garcia along with Estefan and appears on the multi-platinum album Let It Loose. The music video was directed by Jim Yukich and produced by Paul Flattery.

Released as the fifth and final single from that album in early summer of 1988, "1-2-3" peaked at #3 on the Billboard Hot 100 chart in July 1988, and was the band's 7th and last Top 10 hit. In addition, the song became their fourth #1 hit on the Billboard adult contemporary chart. On the Billboard R&B chart, "1-2-3" peaked at 54, and on the UK Singles Chart it peaked at #9. After the success of the re-releases of "Can't Stay Away From You" and "Anything For You", "1-2-3" also saw a re-release outside the US in January 1989. The single release was remixed to add more horns, a stronger rhythm track, and a different intro to the song; this version was issued on Greatest Hits and The Essential Gloria Estefan.

The lyrics of "1-2-3" detail the singer's desire to have a shy suitor approach her.

In 1991, Estefan sang a children's rendition of the song with Big Bird and the Birdketeers on Sesame Street.

== Official versions ==
Original versions

1. Album Version — (3:28)

Eric Schilling & John Haag remixes

1. Remix — (3:36)
2. Remix Instrumental (aka Instrumental Version) — (3:36)
3. Extended Version — (4:42)
4. Dub Mix — (4:44)

Pete Hammond remixes

1. The Dancing By Numbers Mix — (6:27)

== Chart performance ==
=== Weekly charts ===
Chart (1988)	Peak position
Belgium (Ultratop 50 Flanders)	28
Belgium (Ultratop 50 Wallonia)	17
Brazil	63
Europe (European Hot 100 Singles)	33
Ireland (IRMA)	11
Japan (Tokyo)	40
Netherlands (Single Top 100)	13
New Zealand (Recorded Music NZ)	33
Sweden (Sverigetopplistan)	4
UK Singles (OCC)	9
US Billboard Hot 100	3
US Adult Contemporary (Billboard)	1
US Hot Latin Songs (Billboard)	32
US Hot R&B/Hip-Hop Songs (Billboard)	54

=== Year-end charts ===
Chart (1988)	Position
Tokyo (Tokio Hot 100)	100
US Billboard Hot 100	62

== Formats and track listings ==
U.S. & Canada Cassette Single (34T 07921) [June 14, 1988]
No.	Title	Writer(s)	Length
1.	"1-2-3" (Remix)	Gloria M. Estefan, Enrique Garcia	3:36
2.	"1-2-3" (Remix Instrumental)	Gloria M. Estefan, Enrique Garcia	3:36

U.S. & Canada 7" Vinyl Single (34 07921) [June 14, 1988]
No.	Title	Writer(s)	Length
1.	"1-2-3" (Remix)	Gloria M. Estefan, Enrique Garcia	3:36
2.	"1-2-3" (Remix Instrumental)	Gloria M. Estefan, Enrique Garcia	3:36

U.S. Promo 7" Vinyl Single (34 07921) [June 14, 1988]
No.	Title	Writer(s)	Length
1.	"1-2-3" (Remix)	Gloria M. Estefan, Enrique Garcia	3:36
2.	"1-2-3" (Remix)	Gloria M. Estefan, Enrique Garcia	3:36

U.S. Promo 12" Vinyl Single (EAS 1152) [June 14, 1988]
No.	Title	Writer(s)	Length
1.	"1-2-3" (Extended Version)	Gloria M. Estefan, Enrique Garcia	4:42
2.	"1-2-3" (Dub Mix)	Gloria M. Estefan, Enrique Garcia	4:44

Europe 3" CD-Maxi Single (EPC 652958 3)
No.	Title	Writer(s)	Length
1.	"1-2-3" (Extended Version)	Gloria M. Estefan, Enrique Garcia	4:32
2.	"1-2-3" (Remix Instrumental)	Gloria M. Estefan, Enrique Garcia	3:36
3.	"Surrender" (Humberto Gatica Remix)	Lawrence Dermer, Joe Galdo, Rafael Vigil	4:05

Europe 7" Vinyl Single (EPC 652958 7)
No.	Title	Writer(s)	Length
1.	"1-2-3" (Remix)	Gloria M. Estefan, Enrique Garcia	3:36
2.	"1-2-3" (Remix Instrumental)	Gloria M. Estefan, Enrique Garcia	3:36

Europe 12" Vinyl Single #1 (EPC 652958 6)
No.	Title	Writer(s)	Length
1.	"1-2-3" (Extended Version)	Gloria M. Estefan, Enrique Garcia	4:32
2.	"1-2-3" (Remix Instrumental)	Gloria M. Estefan, Enrique Garcia	3:36
3.	"Surrender" (Humberto Gatica Remix)	Lawrence Dermer, Joe Galdo, Rafael Vigil	4:05

Europe 12" Vinyl Single #2 (EPC 652958 1)
No.	Title	Writer(s)	Length
1.	"1-2-3" (The Dancing By Numbers Mix)	Gloria M. Estefan, Enrique Garcia	6:27
2.	"Anything for You" (English / Spanish Version)	Gloria M. Estefan	4:03
3.	"Surrender" (Humberto Gatica Remix)	Lawrence Dermer, Joe Galdo, Rafael Vigil	4:05

U.K. CD-Maxi Single (652958 2) [October 1988]
No.	Title	Writer(s)	Length
1.	"1-2-3" (Extended Version)	Gloria M. Estefan, Enrique Garcia	4:42
2.	"1-2-3" (Dub Mix)	Gloria M. Estefan, Enrique Garcia	4:44
3.	"Surrender" (Humberto Gatica Remix)	Lawrence Dermer, Joe Galdo, Rafael Vigil	4:05
4.	"Primitive Love"	Lawrence Dermer, Joe Galdo, Rafael Vigil	4:41

U.K. 7" Vinyl Single (652958 7) [October 1988]
No.	Title	Writer(s)	Length
1.	"1-2-3" (Remix)	Gloria M. Estefan, Enrique Garcia	3:36
2.	"Surrender" (Humberto Gatica Remix)	Lawrence Dermer, Joe Galdo, Rafael Vigil	4:05

U.K. 7" Vinyl Single (Limited edition poster package) [652958 0] {October 1988}
No.	Title	Writer(s)	Length
1.	"1-2-3" (Remix)	Gloria M. Estefan, Enrique Garcia	3:36
2.	"Surrender" (Humberto Gatica Remix)	Lawrence Dermer, Joe Galdo, Rafael Vigil	4:05

U.K. 12" Vinyl Single #1 (652958 8) [October 1988]
No.	Title	Writer(s)	Length
1.	"1-2-3" (Extended Version)	Gloria M. Estefan, Enrique Garcia	4:32
2.	"1-2-3" (Dub Mix)	Gloria M. Estefan, Enrique Garcia	4:44
3.	"Surrender" (Humberto Gatica Remix)	Lawrence Dermer, Joe Galdo, Rafael Vigil	4:05

U.K. 12" Vinyl Single #2 (652958 1) [October 1988]
No.	Title	Writer(s)	Length
1.	"1-2-3" (The Dancing By Numbers Mix)	Gloria M. Estefan, Enrique Garcia	6:27
2.	"Anything for You" (English / Spanish Version)	Gloria M. Estefan	4:03
3.	"Surrender" (Humberto Gatica Remix)	Lawrence Dermer, Joe Galdo, Rafael Vigil	4:05

Spain Promo 7" Vinyl Single (ARIE 2145)
No.	Title	Writer(s)	Length
1.	"1-2-3" (Remix)	Gloria M. Estefan, Enrique Garcia	3:36

Spain Promo 7" Vinyl Single (ARSP 0001)
No.	Title	Writer(s)	Length
1.	"1-2-3" (The One, Two, Three Mix (aka Remix))	Gloria M. Estefan, Enrique Garcia	3:36
2.	"The Pasadenas - The Pasadenas Medley"	The Pasadenas, Pete Wingfield	4:06

Mexico 7" Vinyl Single (SC-652958)
No.	Title	Writer(s)	Length
1.	"1-2-3" (Remix)	Gloria M. Estefan, Enrique Garcia	3:36
2.	"1-2-3" (Remix Instrumental)	Gloria M. Estefan, Enrique Garcia	3:36

Mexico Promo 7" Vinyl Single (PRSC-652958)
No.	Title	Writer(s)	Length
1.	"1-2-3" (Remix)	Gloria M. Estefan, Enrique Garcia	3:36
2.	"1-2-3" (Remix Instrumental)	Gloria M. Estefan, Enrique Garcia	3:36

Brazil Promo 12" Vinyl Single (52.127)
No.	Title	Writer(s)	Length
1.	"1-2-3" (Remix)	Gloria M. Estefan, Enrique Garcia	3:36

Australia & New Zealand 7" Vinyl Single (652958 7) [November 1988]
No.	Title	Writer(s)	Length
1.	"1-2-3" (Remix)	Gloria M. Estefan, Enrique Garcia	3:36
2.	"Surrender" (Humberto Gatica Remix)	Lawrence Dermer, Joe Galdo, Rafael Vigil	4:05

Australia & New Zealand 12" Vinyl Single #1 (652958 6) [November 1988]
No.	Title	Writer(s)	Length
1.	"1-2-3" (Extended Version)	Gloria M. Estefan, Enrique Garcia	4:32
2.	"1-2-3" (Remix Instrumental)	Gloria M. Estefan, Enrique Garcia	3:36
3.	"Surrender" (Humberto Gatica Remix)	Lawrence Dermer, Joe Galdo, Rafael Vigil	4:05

Philippines 7" Vinyl Single (ES-20122)
No.	Title	Writer(s)	Length
1.	"1-2-3" (Remix)	Gloria M. Estefan, Enrique Garcia	3:36
2.	"Love Toy"	Lawrence Dermer, Joe Galdo, Rafael Vigil	4:31

Japan 7" Vinyl Single (07•5P-481) [July 1, 1987]
No.	Title	Writer(s)	Length
1.	"1-2-3" (Album Version)	Gloria M. Estefan, Enrique Garcia	3:29
2.	"Body To Body"	Suzi Carr, Lawrence Dermer, Joe Galdo	3:56

Japan Promo 12" Vinyl Single (QY•3P-90123)
No.	Title	Writer(s)	Length
1.	"1-2-3" (Album Version)	Gloria M. Estefan, Enrique Garcia	3:29
2.	"The Megamix" (Rhythm Is Gonna Get You, Conga, Dr. Beat, Betcha Say That, Bad Boy)	Gloria M. Estefan, Enrique E. Garcia, Lawrence Dermer, Joe Galdo, Rafael Vigil	9:59

Japan 3" CD Single (10•8P-3032) [July 21, 1988]
No.	Title	Writer(s)	Length
1.	"1-2-3" (Remix)	Gloria M. Estefan, Enrique Garcia	3:36
2.	"1-2-3" (Remix Instrumental)	Gloria M. Estefan, Enrique Garcia	3:36

== Release history ==
Region	Date
U.S.	June 14, 1988
Japan (7" Vinyl)	July 1, 1987
Japan (3" CD)	July 21, 1988
U.K.	October 1988
Australia	November 1988
