= Let It Loose (album) =

- Standard artwork

Studio album by Gloria Estefan and Miami Sound Machine
- Released: June 2, 1987
- Recorded: 1986–1987
- Studio: Criteria (Miami)
- Genres: Pop; dance-pop
- Length: 38:28
- Label: Epic
- Producers: Emilio & The Jerks (Emilio Estefan, Jr. Lawrence Dermer; Joe Galdo; Rafael Vigil)

Gloria Estefan and Miami Sound Machine chronology
Primitive Love (1985)	Let It Loose (1987)	Cuts Both Ways (1989)

Singles from Let It Loose
- 1. "Rhythm Is Gonna Get You" Released: May 1987; 2. "Betcha Say That" Released: September 1, 1987; 3. "Can't Stay Away from You" Released: November 10, 1987; 4. "Anything for You" Released: March 1988; 5. "1-2-3" Released: June 14, 1988

Professional ratings
Review scores
Source	Rating
AllMusic	4/5 stars
Robert Christgau	B+
The Rolling Stone Album Guide	3.5/5 stars

Let It Loose (also released as Anything For You) is a studio album by Gloria Estefan and Miami Sound Machine, released in 1987. Following the success of "Conga", it was billed as "Gloria Estefan and Miami Sound Machine", marking Estefan as the group's main act. The album peaked at number six on the Billboard 200 and was certified triple-platinum by the RIAA.

The album includes the top 5 Billboard Hot 100 singles "Rhythm Is Gonna Get You", "Anything for You", and "1-2-3", in addition to "Betcha Say That" and "Can't Stay Away from You". Following the success of the single "Anything for You", the album was released in Europe under the title Anything For You.

== Track listing ==
All tracks are written by Lawrence Dermer, Joe Galdo, and Rafael Vigil, except where noted.

Side one
No.	Title	Writer(s)	Length
1.	"Betcha Say That"		4:36
2.	"Let It Loose"		2:49
3.	"Can't Stay Away from You"	Gloria M. Estefan	3:56
4.	"Give It Up"	Estefan; Enrique Garcia; Randall Barlow	2:58
5.	"Surrender"		3:59

Side two
No.	Title	Writer(s)	Length
6.	"Rhythm Is Gonna Get You"	Estefan; Garcia	3:55
7.	"Love Toy"		4:30
8.	"I Want You So Bad"		4:17
9.	"1-2-3"	Estefan; Garcia	3:28
10.	"Anything for You"	Estefan	3:41
Total length:			38:28

European, South African and Japanese CD bonus tracks
No.	Title	Writer(s)	Length
11.	"Rhythm Is Gonna Get You" (12" version)	Estefan; Garcia	7:08
12.	"Betcha Say That" (12" version)		7:13
Total length:			53:13

Australia/New Zealand Anything for You CD release
No.	Title	Writer(s)	Length
6.	"Words Get in the Way"	Estefan	3:25
7.	"Rhythm Is Gonna Get You"	Estefan; Garcia	3:57
8.	"Love Toy"		4:33
9.	"I Want You So Bad"		4:22
10.	"1-2-3"	Estefan; Garcia	3:33
11.	"Anything for You"	Estefan	3:41
12.	"Falling in Love (Uh-Oh)"		3:48
13.	"Bad Boy"		3:55
Total length:			49:45

Japan Mini-LP CD Series Limited Edition bonus track (2009)
No.	Title	Writer(s)	Length
13.	"1-2-3" (extended version)	Estefan; Garcia	4:35
14.	"No Te Olvidaré" (Anything for You) (Spanish version)	Estefan	4:03

== Personnel ==
- Gloria Estefan – lead and backing vocals
- John De Faria – all guitars
- Clay Ostwald, Jim Trompeter – keyboards
- Jorge Casas, Will Lee – bass
- Emilio Estefan, Rafael Padilla – percussion
- Enrique Berro "Kiki" Garcia – drums
- Randy Barlow, Teddy Mulett – trumpet
- Clarence Clemons – sax solos on track 2
- Ed Calle – saxophone
- Paquito Hechavarría – piano solos on tracks 5 & 7

=== Production ===
- Emilio Estefan – producer
- Lawrence Dermer – producer
- Rafael Vigil – producer
- Jorge Casa – producer (track 6)
- Clay Ostwald – producer (track 6)
- John Haag – engineer
- Teresa Verplanck – engineer
- Eric Schilling – mixing

== Chart positions ==
Chart (1987–1989)	Peak position
Australian Albums (ARIA)	88
Canadian Albums (RPM)	29
Dutch Albums (Album Top 100)	1
European Albums (Music & Media)	7
German Albums (Offizielle Top 100)	57
New Zealand Albums (RMNZ)	18
Norwegian Albums (VG-lista)	10
Swedish Albums (Sverigetopplistan)	29
UK Albums (Official Charts)	1
US Billboard 200	6
US Latin Pop Albums (Billboard)	16
US Top R&B/Hip-Hop Albums (Billboard)	55

=== Year-end charts ===
Chart	Peak position
U.S. The Billboard 200 (Year-End 1987)	88
U.S. The Billboard 200 (Year-End 1988)	13

== Certifications ==
Region	Certification	Certified units/sales
Canada (Music Canada)	Platinum	100,000^{^}
Japan	—	51,320
Mexico (AMPROFON)	Gold	100,000^{^}
Netherlands (NVPI)	Platinum	100,000^{^}
Sweden (GLF)	Gold	50,000^{^}
United Kingdom (BPI)	4× Platinum	1,200,000^{^}
United States (RIAA)	3× Platinum	3,000,000^{^}
^{^} Shipments figures based on certification alone.

== Release history ==
=== Let It Loose ===
Region	Date
U.S.	June 2, 1987
Canada	June 1, 1987
Europe	June 1, 1987
France	June 12, 1987
Japan	May 21, 1987
Japan (Mini LP CD Series)	July 8, 2009
music on vinyl	July 23, 2023

=== Anything For You ===
Region	Date
U.K.	October 1988
Germany	February 13, 1989
Spain	May 15, 1989
Switzerland	June 9, 1988
Australia	February 13, 1989
