= Miami Sound Machine =

American Latin pop band

- Also known as: Miami Latin Boys (1975–1976)
- Origin: Miami, Florida, U.S.
- Genres: Latin; pop; dance-pop
- Years active: 1975–1992; 2002
- Labels: Audiofon; Epic; RCA Victor; MSM (Miami Sound Machine) Records; Discos CBS International
- Past members: Gloria Estefan; Emilio Estefan Jr.; Enrique "Kiki" García; Rafael Vigil; Juan Ávila; Wesley B. Wright; Merci (Navarro) Murciano; Raúl Murciano; Luis Serrano; Frank Mercado; Fernando García; Louis Pérez; Víctor López; Roger Fisher; Gustavo Lézcano; Betty (Cortés) Wright; Elena Stracuzzi; Leo Villar; Jim "Sport" Trompeter; Rafael Pedilla; Ed Callé; Dana Teboe; Marcella; Randy Barlow; Hernan “Teddy” Mulet; G. Mitchell; Jorgé "George" Casas; Clay Ostwald; John Defaria; Lorena Pinot; Sohanny Gross; Carla Ramírez; Jon Secada

Miami Sound Machine (MSM) was an American Latin pop band of Latin-influenced music that featured the vocals of Cuban-born recording artist Gloria Estefan (née Fajardo). Established in 1975 by Emilio Estefan, the band was originally known as the Miami Latin Boys before becoming the Miami Sound Machine in 1977.

The band released 13 albums and a string of hit singles until 1989. The band's 1985 album Primitive Love credited the band whereas their follow-up album Let It Loose in 1987 placed Gloria Estefan at the forefront. From 1988 to 1989, the latter album was also repackaged as Anything for You with new cover art with the international release in Europe, South Africa, Australia, and New Zealand. In 1989, the group's name ceased being included on the CD or album products—as Gloria Estefan continued as a solo artist.

== History ==
=== 1970s ===
In 1975, Gloria Fajardo and her cousin Mercedes "Merci" Navarro (1957–2007) met Emilio Estefan Jr. while performing at a church ensemble rehearsal. Estefan, who had formed the band The Miami Latin Boys earlier that year, learned about Fajardo through a mutual acquaintance.

While The Miami Latin Boys were performing at a Cuban wedding at Hotel Dupont, Fajardo and Navarro (who were wedding guests) performed two Cuban standards impromptu. They impressed The Miami Latin Boys so much that they were invited to join the band permanently; thereby, the band's name was changed to The Miami Sound Machine. Fajardo, who was attending the University of Miami at the time, only agreed to perform during the weekends so that her studies would not be interrupted.

In 1977, Miami Sound Machine began recording and releasing various albums and 45s on Audiofon Records in Miami, Florida. The group's primary lineup consisted of six Cuban-born Americans:

- Emilio Estefan Jr. (percussion and accordion)
- Gloria Fajardo (lead vocals and hand percussion)
- Merci Navarro (lead vocals) and her husband Raul Murciano (keyboards)
- Enrique "Kiki" Garcia (drums)
- Juan Marcos Avila (bass)

==== Live Again/Renacer ====
In 1977, Miami Sound Machine's first album, Live Again/Renacer, was released with two different covers. The group had several more releases on the Audiofon label, the RCA Victor label, and subsequently Miami Sound Machine's own label Miami Sound Machine Records. In 1978, Gloria Fajardo married Emilio Estefan Jr. after two years of dating. In 1979, Miami Sound Machine added American guitarist and native Miamian Wesley B. Wright and Cuban-born Fernando Garcia on trumpet (unrelated to "Kiki" Garcia).

==== Miami Sound Machine ====
By the end of 1979, the band was signed to Discos CBS International. Miami Sound Machine then released several albums, 45s, and twelve-inch singles beginning with the 1980 Miami Sound Machine album. The combination of traditional Latin rhythms and American R&B grooves combined with the songwriting of Gloria Estefan, "Kiki" Garcia, and Wesley B. Wright set a crossover musical standard for the next two decades.

==== Otra Vez ====
In 1980, Miami Sound Machine added a more complete horn section primarily consisting of trumpeters Fernando Garcia and Victor "Papito" Lopez and trombonist Louis Perez. The permanent addition of a full horn section added a new dimension and would become a future Miami Sound Machine musical trademark. MSM using this lineup flew to San Juan, Puerto Rico in 1981 to record their second LP on the C.B.S. International label. The album was entitled Otra Vez and was recorded at Ochoa Studios in San Juan, Puerto Rico. This would be the last LP to feature the early signature sound of two female vocalists (Gloria and her cousin Merci) singing both in harmony and unison.

==== Rio ====
By early 1982, Roger Fisher was added as a second keyboardist, as well as the virtuoso harmonica player Gustavo Lezcano. Merci and Raul left the band in late 1982, just prior to the recording of the third CBS International LP, Rio. The painfully shy Gloria was now the sole lead vocalist on stage and in the studio. As a result, she began to evolve both systematically and stylistically in her performances. Fisher filled Raul's piano duties. At the same time, Betty Cortés was brought in as replacement for Fisher's second keyboardist role and to sing background vocals live and occasionally in the studio. During the same time period, Elena Stracuzzi was brought in to sing background vocals for live performances. In 1983, Leo Villar was added as second trumpeter to replace Fernando Garcia, who had left the prior year.

==== Eyes of Innocence ====
Miami Sound Machine was now a large ensemble. Despite an eclectic lineup, Miami Sound Machine was focused primarily on the founding members:

- Gloria and Emilio Estefan
- Enrique "Kiki" Garcia
- Juan Marcos Avila
- Wesley B. Wright

By the early 1980s, Miami Sound Machine had established themselves as major musical artists in Latin America with a strong presence in both the media and on the radio. The next major hurdle was conquered in early 1984 when a Dutch DJ began playing "Dr. Beat" in Amsterdam. Garcia's catchy lyrics, Gloria's sassy vocals, Wright's funky guitar, and Emilio's infectious conga drums took Europe by storm with the tune eventually reaching the top 10 in the UK and most of continental Europe, finally causing record labels in the US market to take notice of the group's strong musical prowess.

In late 1984, the group released their first Epic/Columbia album, Eyes of Innocence, which contained the Garcia-penned classic, previously released, single and dance hit "Dr. Beat" as well as the ballad "I Need Your Love".

==== Primitive Love ====
Miami Sound Machine's follow-up album Primitive Love was released in 1985. While the horn section were featured on prominent cuts, guitarist Wesley B. Wright was the only member of the core rhythm section to actually record on the LP. On all of the previous LPs, the band members almost exclusively recorded the original studio tracks. In 1985, there were personnel changes:

- Session percussionist Rafael Padílla, who performed on some of the LP's tracks, was now a permanent member.
- Chicago native Jim "Sport" Trompeter replaced Betty Wright (née Cortés) on second keyboards.
- Venezuelan jazz saxophonist Ed Callé performed on the LP and was added to the horn section.

The successful LP launched three top 10 hits on the Billboard Hot 100: the Garcia-penned "Conga" reached No. 10 on the Billboard Hot 100; "Bad Boy" reached No. 8 and "Words Get in the Way" (written by Gloria Estefan) reaching No. 5 on the Hot 100 and No. 1 on the US Hot Adult Contemporary Tracks chart, establishing that the group could perform pop ballads as successfully as dance tunes. At the end of 1985, the stalwart horn section was in flux, with session player Dana Teboe filling the trombone position in place of the original trombonist, Louis Perez. By early 1986, Victor "Papito" Lopez (known for his iconic jet-black Cuban mustache) was replaced by Randy Barlow. By the end of 1986, Teddy Mulet became the band's official trombonist.

=== Appearances and soundtracks ===
In 1985, Miami Sound Machine appeared on The Tonight Show with Johnny Carson, Solid Gold, American Bandstand, CBS Morning News, Walt Disney specials, and frequent spots on MTV. The band twice performed on the television presentation of the Miss Universe Pageant (1984, 1986). The song "Hot Summer Nights" was released that year and was part of the soundtrack for the film Top Gun. The song "Suavé" was recorded as part of the soundtrack for the Sylvester Stallone film Cobra. Miami Sound Machine also made a cameo appearance in the ABC Sunday Night Movie Club Med.

After a massive world tour that ran from 1985 to 1986, the following members left the group: guitarist Wesley B. Wright, founding bassist Juan Marcos Avila, and keyboardist Roger Fisher. Emilio assumed the role of producer and no longer performed live.

=== Let It Loose / Anything for You ===
Miami Sound Machine returned to the studio in early 1987, and bassist Jorgé "George" Casas, keyboardist Clay Ostwald, and guitarist John DeFaria joined the remaining members. With "Kiki" Garcia being the remaining core member, Gloria Estefan was given top billing and the band's name was changed to Gloria Estefan and Miami Sound Machine to capitalize on the lead singer's mass appeal.

In late 1987, Miami Sound Machine released Let It Loose, and it went multi-platinum, with three million copies sold in the US alone. It featured the hits "Anything for You" reaching number 1 on the Billboard Hot 100, "1-2-3" making it to No. 3, "Betcha Say That" to number 36, "Rhythm Is Gonna Get You" to No. 5, and "Can't Stay Away from You" to No. 6. "Can't Stay Away from You", "Anything for You" and "1-2-3" were also hit singles on the Adult Contemporary chart.

Another world tour began and the group traveled for the first time to Europe, South America, and an even more extensive tour in the United States, culminating with a sold-out concert in their hometown of Miami, Florida, which was recorded and later sold on VHS. By 1988, founding member "Kiki" Garcia quit. With no core members remaining other than Gloria herself, the "Miami Sound Machine" moniker was used from that point on for concerts and live performances only.

In 1988, after the worldwide chart success of single "Anything for You", her Let it Loose album was repackaged overseas as Anything for You. It became the band's first UK number 1 album, selling over a million copies. It was the biggest-selling album of the year in The Netherlands, staying at number 1 for 16 weeks. The album also took top honors in Australia and Canada, launching Gloria Estefan to superstar status.

By the end of 1988, none of the originating members of Miami Sound Machine were performing with Estefan. A new rhythm section was put in place, and the horn section was expanded.

Although there have been changes in personnel, three members (Jorge Casas, Clay Ostwald and Teddy Mulet) have performed with Estefan since 1986. The current rhythm section has been in place since 1992 (with the subsequent addition of drummer Olbin Burgos and percussionist Edwin Bonilla). Seven members of the Miami Sound Machine lineage appeared in New York City's staging of the Broadway show On Your Feet!: Jorge Casas, Clay Ostwald, Teddy Mulet, Olbin Burgos, Edwin Bonilla, Tom Timko and David Fernandez.

=== Revamping attempt ===
In 2002, an attempt was made to create an offshoot Miami Sound Machine with a new eponymous album (produced by Emilio Estefan) and a completely different lineup consisting of Lorena Pinot, Sohanny Gross and Carla Ramirez.

Without Gloria Estefan's signature vocals or any real connection to the preexisting Miami Sound Machine musicians, however, the new project was only met with moderate success in a few select European countries and failed to chart significantly in the United States.

== Members ==
Miami Sound Machine (1977–1986)

- Gloria Estefan (1977–1988) – vocals, hand percussion, and songwriter
- Emilio Estefan (1975–1986) – percussion and accordion
- Enrique "Kiki" Garcia (1975–1988) – drums and songwriter
- Juan Marcos Avíla (1977–1986) – bass
- Frank Mercado (1986–1991) - bass and background vocals
- Wesley B. Wright (1979–1986) – guitar and songwriter
- Mercí (Navarro) Murcíano (1977–1982) – piano and keyboards
- Raul Murcíano (1976–1982) – piano and keyboards
- Luis Serrano (1975–1977) – bass
- Fernando Garcia (1979–1981)
- Mike Scaglione (1988–present) - saxophone
- Louis Pérez (1980–1985) – trombone
- Marcella (1980-1988) - Acoustics
- Victor Lopez (1980–1986) – trumpet
- Roger Fisher (1982–1986) – piano and keyboards
- Gustavo Lézcano (1982–1984) – harmonica
- Betty (Cortés) Wright (1982–1985) – synthesizer and background vocals
- Elena Stracuzzi (1982–1983) – background vocals
- Leo Víllar (1983) – trumpet
- Jim "Sport" Trompeter (1985–1988)
- Rafael Pedílla (1985–1988) – percussion
- Ed Callé (1985–1987) – saxophone
- Dana Teboe (1985–1986) – trombone
- Randy Barlow (1985–2010) – trumpet
- Teddy Mulet (1986–present) – trombone & trumpet
- Jon Secada (1986–1992) – backup vocals

Gloria Estefan and Miami Sound Machine (1987–1988)

- Jorgé "George" Casas (1987–2019) – bass
- Clay Ostwald (1987–present) – keyboards
- John Defaria (1987–1988) – guitar

Miami Sound Machine II (2002)

- Lorena Pinot – vocals
- Sohanny Gross – vocals
- Carla Ramirez – vocals

== Discography ==
=== Albums ===
- 1977: Live Again/Renacer
- 1978: Miami Sound Machine (Spanish Version)
- 1978: Miami Sound Machine (English Version)
- 1979: Imported
- 1980: Miami Sound Machine
- 1981: Otra Vez
- 1982: Río
- 1983: A Toda Máquina
- 1984: Eyes of Innocence
- 1985: Primitive Love
- 1987: Let It Loose (Gloria Estefan and Miami Sound Machine)
- 1989: Cuts Both Ways (Estefan's debut solo album)
- 2002: MSM: Miami Sound Machine (without Estefan or any original members)

=== Selected singles ===
- 1984: "Dr. Beat"
- 1984: "Prisoner of Love"
- 1984: "I Need a Man"
- 1985: "Conga"
- 1986: "Bad Boy"
- 1986: "Words Get in the Way"
- 1986: "Falling in Love (Uh-Oh)"
- 1987: "Rhythm Is Gonna Get You"
- 1987: "Betcha Say That"
- 1988: "Can't Stay Away from You"
- 1988: "1-2-3"
- 1988: "Anything for You"
- 1989: "Don't Wanna Lose You"
- 1989: "Get on Your Feet"
- 1989: "Here We Are"
- 1989: "Oye Mi Canto"
