= Gloria Estefan =

Cuban-American singer and songwriter (born 1957)

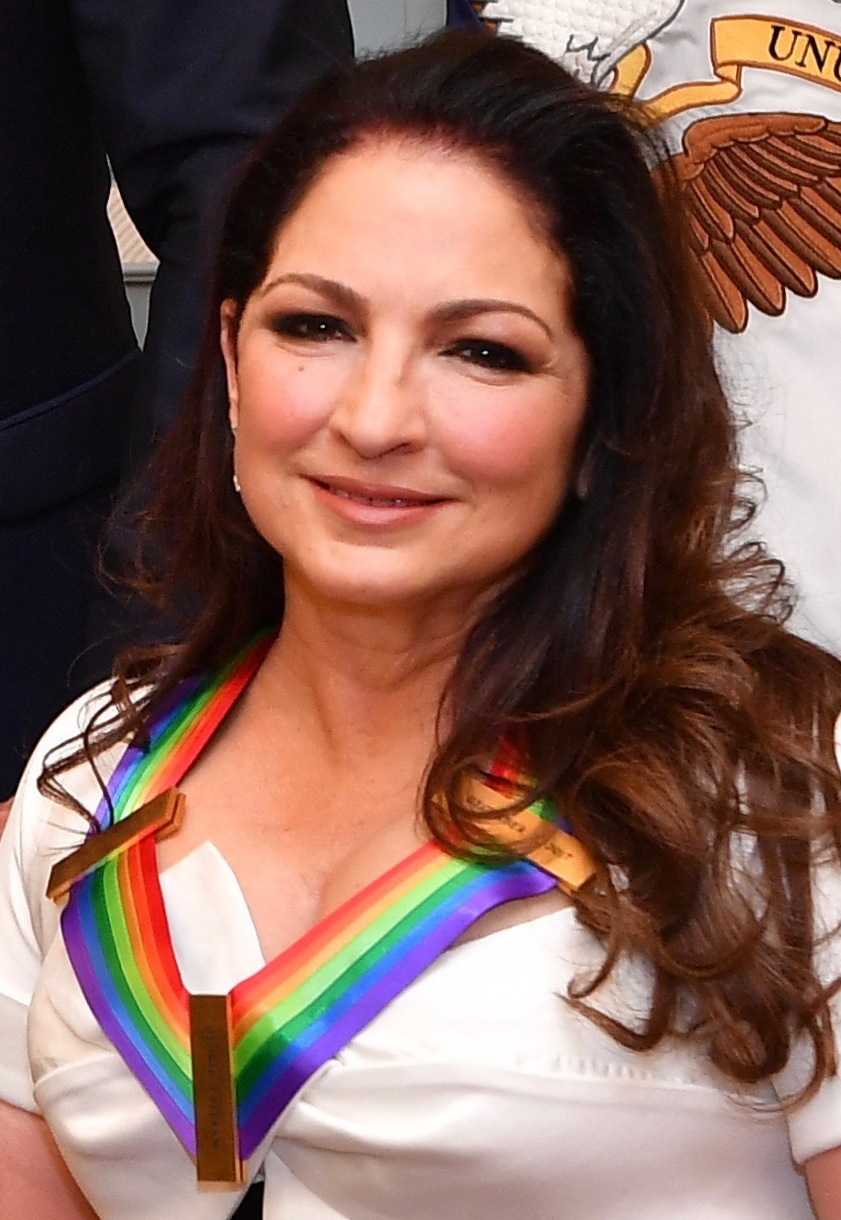
- Estefan in 2017
- Born: Gloria María Milagrosa Fajardo García; September 1, 1957 (age 69); Havana, Cuba
- Occupations: Singer; songwriter; actress; author; businesswoman
- Years active: 1975–present
- Spouse: Emilio Estefan Gómez (m. 1978)
- Children: 2, including Emily
- Relatives: Lili Estefan (niece)
- Musical career
- Origin: Miami, Florida, U.S.
- Genres: Latin pop; dance-pop; tropical
- Labels: Epic; Burgundy; Crescent Moon; Sony Latin; Verve Forecast; Sony Masterworks
- Formerly of: Miami Sound Machine

Gloria María Milagrosa Estefan (Latin American Spanish pronunciation: [ˈɡloɾja esˈtefan]; née Fajardo García; born September 1, 1957) is a Cuban-American singer, songwriter, actress, and businesswoman. Estefan is a five-time Grammy Award winner and a Presidential Medal of Freedom recipient, and has been named one of the Top 100 greatest artists of all time by both VH1 and Billboard. Estefan's record sales exceed 100 million worldwide, making her one of the best-selling music artists of all time.

A contralto, Estefan started her career as lead singer of Miami Latin Boys, which was later renamed Miami Sound Machine. She and Miami Sound Machine earned worldwide success with their 1985 single "Conga", which became Estefan's signature song. The group followed this with a number of hit singles throughout the decade, including "Anything for You", "1-2-3", "Bad Boy", and "Rhythm Is Gonna Get You". The group was redubbed as Gloria Estefan and Miami Sound Machine with the release of their 1987 album Let It Loose, and in 1989, Estefan rose to solo stardom with her debut solo album, Cuts Both Ways.

In March 1990, Estefan sustained a life-threatening cervical fracture of her spine when her tour bus was involved in a crash near Scranton, Pennsylvania. She underwent an emergency surgery and made a full recovery. The following year, Estefan launched her comeback with a worldwide tour and album, Into the Light. Estefan's 1993 Spanish-language album, Mi Tierra, won the first of her three Grammy Awards for Best Tropical Latin Album. The album was also the first Diamond album in Spain. Estefan's catalog of international solo hits includes "Don't Wanna Lose You", "Get On Your Feet", "Coming Out of the Dark", "Turn the Beat Around", "You'll Be Mine (Party Time)", and "Heaven's What I Feel".

Estefan has been awarded a star on the Hollywood Walk of Fame and Las Vegas Walk of Fame and was a Kennedy Center Honors recipient in 2017 for her contributions to American cultural life. Estefan won an MTV Video Music Award, was honored with the American Music Award for Lifetime Achievement and has been named BMI Songwriter of the Year. She was inducted into the Songwriters Hall of Fame and has received multiple Billboard Music Awards. She is also a recipient of the 2015 Presidential Medal of Freedom, which was conferred by the then-President of the United States, Barack Obama.

Billboard has listed Estefan as the second-most successful Latina and 23rd-greatest Latin artist of all time in the U.S., based on both Latin albums and Latin songs chart. Hailed as the "Queen of Latin Pop" and "Mother of Latin Pop" by the media, she has amassed 38 number-one hits across Billboard charts, including 15 chart-topping songs on the Hot Latin Songs chart.

== Early life ==
Gloria Estefan was born Gloria María Milagrosa Fajardo García in Havana, La Habana Province, Cuba on September 1, 1957 to parents José Manuel Fajardo Montano (1933–1980) and Gloria García Pérez de Fajardo (1930–2017). Estefan's maternal grandparents were Spanish immigrants. Her maternal grandfather, Leonardo García, emigrated to Cuba from Pola de Siero, Asturias, Spain, where he married Gloria's grandmother, Consuelo Pérez, who was originally from Logroño, Spain. Consuelo's father Pantaleón Pérez served as the head chef to two Cuban presidents. Estefan's paternal side had musical sensibilities, as the lineage had famous bandleader and flautist José Fajardo and a classical pianist.

Estefan's mother Gloria Fajardo, nicknamed "Big Gloria", won an international contest during her childhood and received a Hollywood offer to dub Shirley Temple's films in Spanish. However, Leonardo García did not permit his daughter to pursue the offer. Gloria Fajardo earned a Ph.D. in education in Cuba, but her diploma and other papers were destroyed by Cuban officials when she left for the United States.

Estefan's paternal grandparents were José Manuel Fajardo González and Amelia Montano. José Manuel was a Cuban soldier and a motor escort for the wife of Cuban president Fulgencio Batista, and Amelia Montano was a poet. As a result of the Cuban Revolution, the Fajardo family fled and settled in Miami, in 1959, and ran one of the first Cuban restaurants in the city. In 1961, Estefan's father José participated in the failed Bay of Pigs Invasion. He was captured by his cousin, who was a member of the Cuban army, and imprisoned in Cuba for nearly two years. On his return, he joined the United States military and fought in the Vietnam War.

After returning from the Vietnam War in 1968, Estefan's father became ill with multiple sclerosis, attributed to Agent Orange exposure that he suffered in Vietnam. Estefan helped her mother care for him and her younger sister Rebecca, nicknamed "Becky" (b. 1963), while her mother worked to support them. Gloria Fajardo first had to regain her teaching credentials, then worked as a schoolteacher for the Dade County Public School system. When Estefan was nine, she alleged that a music teacher hired to teach her guitar lessons sexually abused her. She alleged that the man told her that he would kill her mother if she told anyone about the abuse. Estefan told her mother, who alerted the police of the allegation; charges were not pressed because of the additional trauma she felt Estefan would undergo as a result of testifying against the perpetrator. When Estefan was 16, her father's illness led him to be hospitalized at a Veterans Administration medical facility.

Estefan became a naturalized citizen of the United States in 1974 under the name Gloria Garcia Fajardo.

=== Education ===
Estefan was raised Roman Catholic and attended Our Lady of Lourdes Academy in Miami, where she was a member of the National Honor Society.

Estefan attended the University of Miami in Coral Gables, Florida, where she graduated in 1979 with a B.A. in psychology and a minor in French. While attending the University of Miami, Estefan also worked as an English, Spanish, and French translator at Miami International Airport's Customs Department and, because of her language abilities, says she was once approached by the CIA as a possible employee. In 1984, she was inducted into the Iron Arrow Honor Society, the highest honor bestowed by the University of Miami.

== Career ==
=== 1975–1988: Miami Sound Machine ===
In 1975, Estefan and her cousin Mercedes "Merci" Navarro (1957–2007) met Emilio Estefan, Jr. while performing at a church ensemble rehearsal. Emilio, who had formed the band the Miami Latin Boys earlier in that year, learned about Estefan through a mutual acquaintance. While the Miami Latin Boys were performing at a Cuban wedding at the Dupont Plaza Hotel, Estefan and Navarro, who were wedding guests, performed two Cuban standards impromptu. They impressed the Miami Latin Boys so much that they were invited to join the band permanently with the band's name changing to Miami Sound Machine. Estefan, who was attending the University of Miami at the time, agreed to perform only on weekends so that her studies would not be interrupted.

In 1977, Miami Sound Machine began recording and releasing various albums and 45s on the Audiofon Records label in Miami. Their first album was titled Live Again/Renacer (1977). After several more releases on the Audiofon, RCA Victor, and MSM Records labels, the band was signed to Discos CBS International and released several albums beginning with the 1978 self-titled album Miami Sound Machine. In 1978, Gloria married Emilio Estefan Jr. after two years of dating. Growing in popularity in both the U.S. and around the world, the group continued recording and issuing various works for Discos CBS International through 1985.

In 1984, Miami Sound Machine released their first Epic/Columbia album, Eyes of Innocence, which included the dance hit "Dr. Beat" and the ballad "I Need Your Love". Their more successful follow-up album Primitive Love was released in 1985, and contained three Top 10 hits on the Billboard Hot 100: "Conga" (U.S. No. 10), "Words Get in the Way" (U.S. No. 5), and "Bad Boy" (U.S. No. 8), as well as "Falling in Love (Uh-Oh)" (U.S. No. 25). "Words Get in the Way" reached No. 1 on the US Hot Adult Contemporary Tracks chart, establishing that the group could perform pop ballads as successfully as dance tunes. The song "Hot Summer Nights" was also released that year and was part of the film Top Gun.

Their next album, Let It Loose (1987), went multi-platinum, with three million copies sold in the US alone. It featured the hits "Anything for You" (No. 1 Hot 100), "1-2-3" (No. 3 Hot 100), "Betcha Say That" (No. 36 Hot 100), "Rhythm Is Gonna Get You" (No. 5 Hot 100), and "Can't Stay Away from You" (No. 6 Hot 100). "Can't Stay Away From You", "Anything for You", and "1-2-3" were all No. 1 Adult Contemporary hits as well. In that same year, Estefan took top billing and the band's name changed to Gloria Estefan and Miami Sound Machine. In 1988, after the worldwide chart success of single "Anything for You", the Let It Loose album was repackaged as Anything for You.

=== 1989–1992: Cuts Both Ways and Into the Light ===
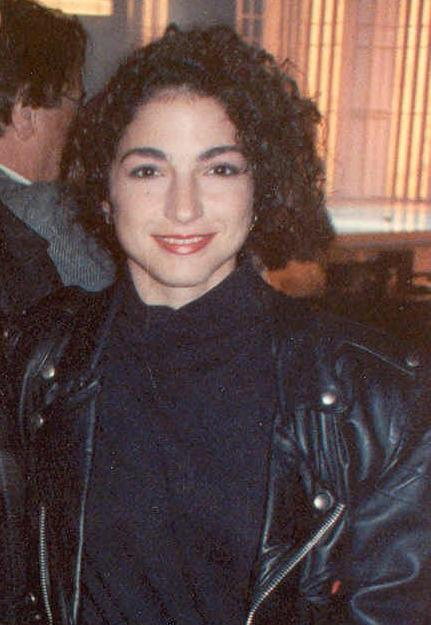
Estefan in February 1990

In 1989, the group's name was dropped, and Estefan has been credited as a solo artist ever since. In late 1989, Estefan released her best-selling album to date, Cuts Both Ways. The album included the hit singles "Don't Wanna Lose You" (Hot 100 No. 1 hit), "Oye Mi Canto", "Here We Are", "Cuts Both Ways" (No. 1 on the U.S. Hot Adult Contemporary Tracks chart), and "Get on Your Feet".

On March 20, 1990, while touring in support of Cuts Both Ways, Estefan was critically injured, suffering a fractured spine when a semi-truck crashed into her tour bus during a snowstorm near Scranton, Pennsylvania. Estefan was returning from a meeting with President George Bush to discuss participation in an anti-drug campaign. She was taken to Community Medical Center's Intensive Care Unit in Scranton and flown by helicopter the following day to the Hospital for Joint Diseases at NYU Langone Health in New York City, where she underwent surgery that included implanting two titanium rods to stabilize her vertebral column. Her rehabilitation included almost a year of intensive physical therapy, and she said, "there were times when the pain was so bad I prayed I'd pass out." However, she ultimately recovered completely.

In January 1991, Estefan released the concept album Into the Light. That same month, she performed "Coming Out of the Dark" for the first time at the American Music Awards to a standing ovation, the performance coming ten months after the crash. "Coming Out of the Dark" reached No. 1 on the U.S. Billboard Hot 100. Other notable singles from Into the Light were "Seal Our Fate" and "Live for Loving You". The album peaked at No. 5 on the Billboard albums chart and at No. 2 on the British albums chart. The album eventually went double platinum in the US and platinum in the UK.

On January 26, 1992, Estefan performed in the Super Bowl XXVI halftime show. Estefan released Greatest Hits in 1992, and the album included the U.S. hit ballads "Always Tomorrow" and "I See Your Smile" along with the international hit dance track "Go Away". That same year, Estefan sang backup vocals on fellow Cuban-American singer-songwriter Jon Secada's breakthrough single "Just Another Day" and received songwriting credit for the Spanish-language version Otro Día Más Sin Verte.

=== 1993–1995: Mi Tierra, Christmas Through Your Eyes, cover album, and Abriendo Puertas ===
In June 1993, Estefan released her first Spanish-language album, Mi Tierra. Mi Tierra peaked at No. 27 on the Billboard album chart and No. 1 on the Top Latin Albums chart. In the US, the singles "Mi Tierra", the romantic-tropical ballad "Con Los Años Que Me Quedan", and "Mi Buen Amor" all reached No. 1 on the "Hot Latin Tracks" chart. The album sold over eight million copies worldwide, going on to become multi-platinum in Spain (10 times) and in the US (16 times; Platinum – Latin field), and earning the Grammy Award for Best Tropical Latin Album.

In September 1993, Estefan released her first Christmas album, Christmas Through Your Eyes. It was also notable as being the first album from Estefan that was not produced by her husband. The album included the singles "This Christmas" and "Silent Night" and went Platinum in the US.

Estefan released Hold Me, Thrill Me, Kiss Me in October 1994, a cover album featuring some of her favorite songs from the 1960s and 1970s. The album includes the hit singles "Turn the Beat Around", which peaked at number 13 on the Billboard Hot 100, and "Everlasting Love", which peaked at number 27. Both songs also topped the Billboard Hot Dance Club Play chart. Further single releases were "Hold Me, Thrill Me, Kiss Me", which peaked at number 11 in the UK, and "It's Too Late". Hold Me, Thrill Me, Kiss Me peaked at number nine on the US Billboard 200 and has sold over 2 million copies in the United States.

In 1995, Estefan released her second Spanish-language album, Abriendo Puertas. The album earned Estefan her second Grammy Award for Best Tropical Latin Album. It spawned two No. 1 dance hits ("Abriendo Puertas" and "Tres Deseos") and two No. 1 Latin singles ("Abriendo Puertas" and "Más Allá").

=== 1996–2002: Destiny, Gloria!, and Alma Caribeña ===
Estefan (center) celebrates with Emilio Estefan (right) and Miami-Dade Mayor Alex Penelas (left) at the May 1999 announcement of her plans to perform her "Millennium Concert" in Miami

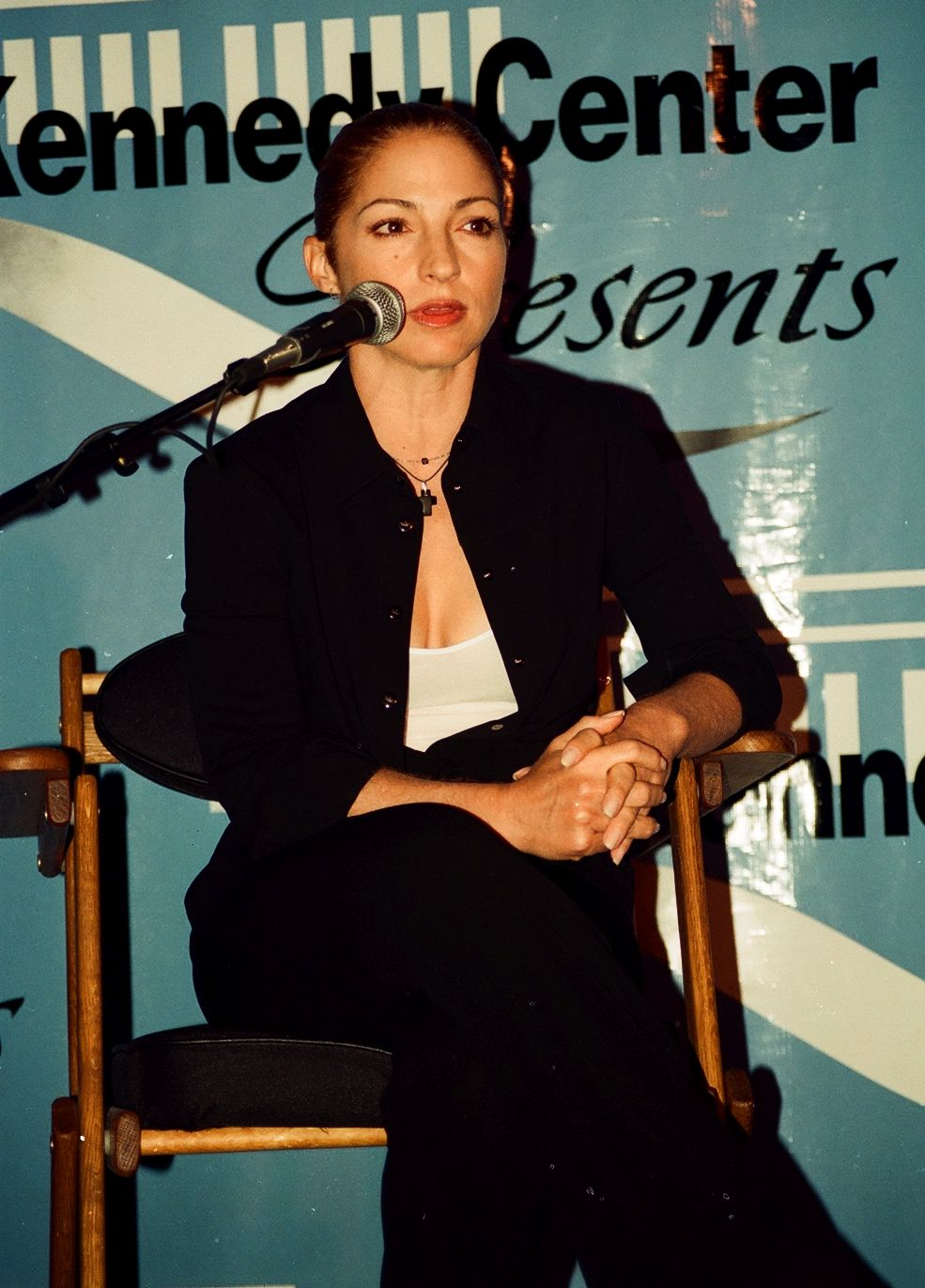
Estefan in 2000

In 1996, Estefan released her platinum-selling album Destiny, which featured "Reach". The song served as the official theme of the 1996 Atlanta Summer Olympics. Estefan performed "Reach" and "You'll Be Mine" at the Summer Olympics closing ceremony. On 18 July 1996, she embarked on her first tour in five years—the Evolution World Tour—which covered the U.S., Canada, Europe, Latin America, Australia and Asia.

On June 2, 1998, she released her eighth solo album, Gloria!. The album blended disco with salsa music percussion and Latin flavor. The album peaked at No. 23 on the Billboard 200 and was certified Gold. The single "Oye!" peaked at No. 1 on the Hot Dance Music/Club Play and the Hot Latin Tracks charts. The other major single releases were "Don't Let This Moment End" (which peaked at No. 76 on the Billboard Hot 100) and "Heaven's What I Feel" (which peaked at No. 27 on the Hot 100).

In early 1999, Estefan performed in the Super Bowl XXXIII halftime show, her second appearance in a Super Bowl halftime show. In 1999, Estefan performed with 'N Sync on the single "Music of My Heart"—a song featured in the film Music of the Heart, in which she also appeared. The song peaked at No. 2 on the Billboard chart and was nominated for an Academy Award. She also released a Latin hit with the Brazilian group So Pra Contrariar called "Santo Santo", which she sang with Luciano Pavarotti in Pavarotti and Friends for Guatemala and Kosovo.

Alma Caribeña (Caribbean Soul) was released in May 2000. It was her third Spanish-language album, with a focus on Caribbean rhythms. The album featured several Latin hits such as "No Me Dejes De Querer", "Como Me Duele Perderte", and "Por Un Beso". The album earned Estefan her third Grammy Award for Best Traditional Tropical Latin Album in February 2001.

=== 2003–2009: Unwrapped and 90 Millas ===
In 2003, Estefan released Unwrapped. To promote the CD, she toured Europe, Mexico, Puerto Rico and the U.S. "Hoy" and "Tu Fotografía" both reached No. 1 on Billboard's Latin chart and "I Wish You" reached the Adult Contemporary Charts top 20. Estefan embarked on the Live & Re-Wrapped Tour in support of the album; the tour was produced by Clear Channel Entertainment and played 26 cities upon launching in Hidalgo, Texas on July 30, 2004.

On April 7. 2005, Estefan participated in Selena ¡VIVE!, a tribute concert for the "Queen of Tejano" Selena Quintanilla-Pérez. She performed Selena's hit song "I Could Fall in Love". Also that year, Estefan sang "Young Hearts Run Free" on the soundtrack for the television series Desperate Housewives. In late 2005, the club mash-up "Dr. Pressure" was released; the song combined Mylo's No. 19 hit "Drop The Pressure" with the Miami Sound Machine's "Dr. Beat". It reached No. 3 on the UK singles chart and No. 1 on the Australian dance chart.

In October 2006, Sony released the compilation The Essential Gloria Estefan, featuring her hits from 1984 to 2003, Estefan made several radio and television appearances to promote The Essential Gloria Estefan. She released two additional similar compilation albums that year for other markets. The Very Best of Gloria Estefan was released in Europe and Mexico; this compilation was certified Gold in Ireland. Oye Mi Canto!: Los Grandes Exitos featured a collection of her Spanish-language hits and was released in Spain.

Estefan released the Spanish album 90 Millas on 18 September 2007. The album was produced by Emilio Estefan and Gaitan Bros (Gaitanes), and composed by Emilio Estefan, Gloria Estefan, Ricardo Gaitán and Alberto Gaitán. The title alludes to the distance between Miami and Cuba. The album peaked at No. 1 on the Billboard Top Latin Albums chart and at No. 25 on the Billboard 200 list, selling 25,000 units in its first week. In Spain, it debuted at No. 3 and was certified gold. The album won a Latin Grammy Award for Best Traditional Tropical Album and "Pintame de Colores" won the award for Best Tropical Song.

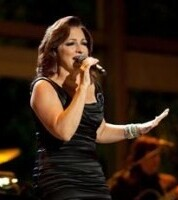
Estefan performing at the White House in October 2009

In 2008, Estefan appeared during the seventh season of American Idol for the special charity episode "Idol Gives Back". She performed "Get on Your Feet" along with Sheila E. Estefan became the headliner of the MGM Grand at Foxwoods Resort Casino's new venue. She then headed to Canada to perform at the Casino Rama. In August, she started her 90 Millas World Tour. Estefan played concerts in London, Rotterdam, Belfast and Aruba. Estefan performed several concerts in Spain, specifically Madrid, Barcelona, Zaragoza and Tenerife. Two of these concerts, in Las Ventas, Spain, and in Rotterdam, The Netherlands, were free to the public. Back in the States, Estefan performed a special concert at the Seminole Hard Rock Hotel and Casino to raise funds for the Education of South Florida. Estefan was a headliner for Bette Midler's "Annual Hulaween Gala". The event benefited the New York Restoration Project. During the Thanksgiving season, Estefan appeared on Rosie O'Donnell's television special Rosie Live singing a duet with O'Donnell titled "Gonna Eat for Thanksgiving", an alternate version of "Gonna Eat for Christmas" from O'Donnell's album A Rosie Christmas.

In 2009, Estefan announced plans for her "farewell tour" of Latin America and South America. The tour continued with a concert at Guadalajara in Mexico, as part of a program designed to improve tourism in Mexico, and a series of appearances at music festivals throughout Europe, including headlining at the Summer Pops Music Festival in Liverpool on 27 July 2009. The same year, Estefan opened the "In Performance at the White House: Fiesta Latina 2009" with "No Llores". At the end, Estefan together with Jennifer Lopez, Thalía, Marc Anthony, and José Feliciano performed a rendition of her Spanish-language hit "Mi Tierra".

=== 2010–2019: Miss Little Havana and The Standards ===
Estefan began 2010 with a charity single: she and her husband, producer Emilio Estefan Jr., invited artists to record "Somos El Mundo", a Spanish-language version of Michael Jackson's song "We Are the World". The song, written by Estefan and approved by Quincy Jones, was recorded and premiered during El Show de Cristina on 1 March 2010. All of the proceeds went to Haitian relief. On 24 March 2010, Estefan led a march down Miami's Calle Ocho in support of Cuba's Las Damas de Blanco (Ladies in White). Later that year, Estefan took part in Broadway's "24 Hour Plays", performing alongside actors Elijah Wood, Diane Neal, and Alicia Witt in the play I Think You'll Love This One, written by Elizabeth Cruz Cortes.

On 7 April 2011, Estefan made an unannounced appearance at the auditions for The X Factor in Miami, and gave encouragement to the 7,500 participants gathered outside the Bank United Center. That year, Estefan was inducted into the Hollywood Bowl Hall of Fame. She performed at a special concert on 17 June 2011; proceeds from the event went to benefit the Los Angeles Philharmonic Institute's education programs.

Estefan's dance-oriented album Miss Little Havana was released in the U.S. on 27 September 2011, with the physical CD available exclusively at Target. Estefan described the album as resembling her 1998 hit album Gloria!; for the album, she collaborated with producers Pharrell Williams, Motiff, Emilio Estefan, and Drop Dead Beats. The first single from the album, "Wepa", premiered on 31 May 2011, at American Airlines Arena in a special music video of the song for the Miami Heat. The Heat video was released on YouTube on 1 June. The song went on sale for digital download on 24 July. Both "Wepa" and the album's second single, "Hotel Nacional", peaked at No. 1 on the Billboard Latin Songs and Dance/Club charts. In the fall of 2011, Estefan expressed her views on gay rights and gay marriage and said that she was a strong supporter of both. She said: "I think everyone should be able to marry who they love, and it should just be." Estefan also recorded a video for the It Gets Better campaign. In November 2011, Estefan began hosting Gloria Estefan's Latin Beat, a seven-part series for BBC Radio 2 in the United Kingdom that explores the history of Latin music.

In August 2012, Estefan starred in the CW Network reality show The Next: Fame Is at Your Doorstep opposite Joe Jonas, Nelly and John Rich. The same year, Estefan appeared as a musical guest in Tony Bennett's compilation of duets with Latin-American musicians, Viva Duets, with "Who Can I Turn To". Weeks later, she released the charity single "Por Un Mundo Mejor" with Mexican singer Lucero, Dominican rapper El Cata, and Mexican pop band Reik. The song was marked as the official hymn for the American division of Teletón.

In May 2013, she appeared on Paul Anka's Duets album with the song "Think I'm in Love Again". In September 2013, Estefan released The Standards. The album features collaborations with Laura Pausini, Dave Koz and Joshua Bell, and a selection of songs from the Great American Songbook. The album reached No. 20 on the US Billboard 200 chart, marking her first top 20 album on the chart since 1994's Hold Me, Thrill Me, Kiss Me. The first single from the album was "How Long Has This Been Going On?".

In April 2014, Estefan and her husband were honored at the 2014 "Power of Love Event for Keep Memory Alive" in Las Vegas, where other musicians, including Ricky Martin and Rita Moreno, offered the couple a tribute to their music. Estefan joined Carlos Santana on his new album Corazon in a song called "Besos de lejos". Estefan released the compilation Soy Mujer on 23 June 2015, which consists of Estefan's Spanish-language hits.

=== 2020–present: Brazil305 and Raíces ===
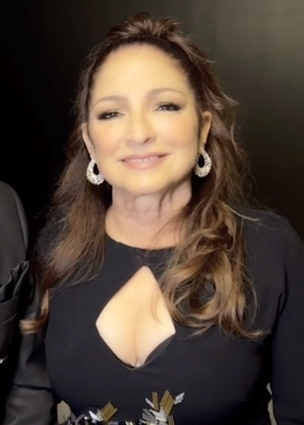
Estefan in 2022 at the Florida Golfshore Ballet

Estefan announced she was working on re-recording her music catalog with Brazilian rhythms and four new songs on an album titled Brazil305. She released the first single for the album, "Cuando Hay Amor", on 12 June 2020.

In April 2020, Estefan released "Put on Your Mask", a parody of her 1989 song "Get on Your Feet", with the lyrics changed to reflect the importance of wearing face masks during the COVID-19 pandemic. In May 2020, Estefan wrote and released "We Needed Time" to reflect her feelings around the COVID-19 global pandemic. The video for the song was shot in Star Island, Miami by socially distanced cinematographers using drone cameras.

In 2022, the Estefans released a Christmas album tilted Estefan Family Christmas. The album includes Gloria Estefan, her daughter Emily, and her grandson.

The soundtrack single "Gonna Be You" from the film 80 for Brady was released on January 20, 2023. The song was written by Diane Warren, and performed by Dolly Parton, Belinda Carlisle, Cyndi Lauper, Debbie Harry and Gloria Estefan. The official music video shows Parton, Carlisle, Lauper, and Estefan performing while wearing football jerseys similar to the ones worn by the women in the film, interspersed with clips from the film.

Estefan released her next album, Raíces, on May 28, 2025. It debuted at No. 9 in the U.S. Billboard tropical charts. The album won the Grammy Award for Best Tropical Latin Album at the 68th Annual Grammy Awards.

== Other work ==
=== Stage musical ===
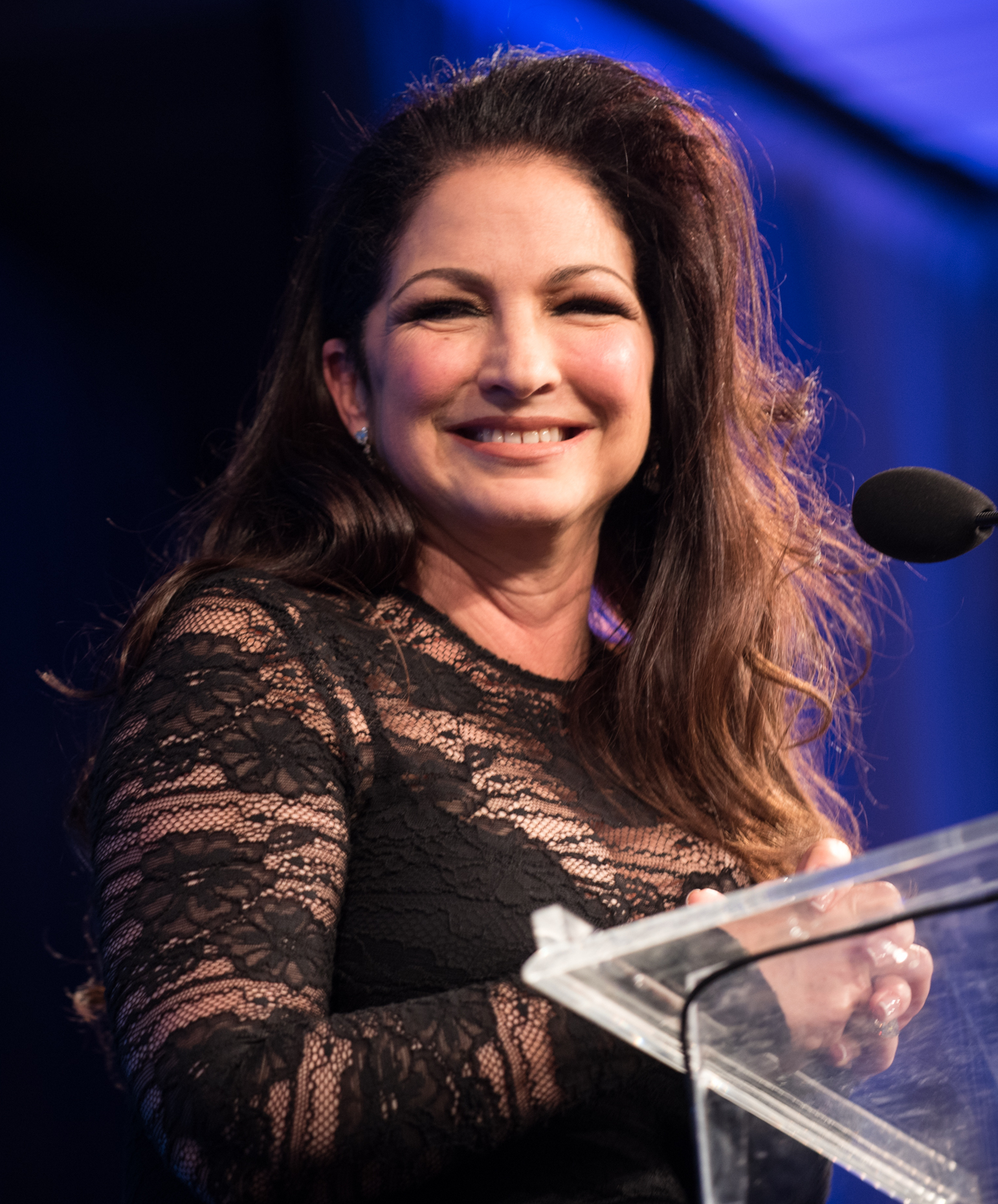
Estefan in 2018

A jukebox musical, On Your Feet!, about the life of Gloria and Emilio Estefan, premiered on Broadway on November 5, 2015. The musical premiered at the Oriental Theater in Chicago running from June 17 to July 5. Directed by Jerry Mitchell, the choreography is by Sergio Trujillo and the book by Alexander Dinelaris. The Chicago cast featured Ana Villafañe as Gloria and Josh Segarra as Emilio.

The musical ran on Broadway at the Marquis Theatre starting on October 5 for previews and November 5 for opening night. The production closed on Broadway on August 20, 2017, after 34 previews and 746 regular performances.

In June 2019, the show played at The Curve in Leicester, UK, before moving to the West End's London Coliseum In London from June to August 2019.

=== Film and television appearances ===
Estefan has appeared in two live-action films, Music of the Heart (1999) and For Love or Country: The Arturo Sandoval Story (2000). Estefan made a cameo appearance with her husband in Marley & Me (2008). Estefan starred in a made-for-TV movie on HBO in the remake of "Father of the Bride" with Andy Garcia. The film had a Latin/Cuban America twist, which premiered on 16 June 2022 on HBO Max.

Estefan was cast to star as Connie Francis, a U.S. pop singer of the 1950s and early 1960s, in the biographical film Who's Sorry Now? According to Parade magazine (23 March 2008), filming supposedly began in late 2008. In an interview with www.allheadlinenews.com, Estefan stated that the film would be released in 2009. However, as of December 2009, the film was dropped as Connie Francis had irreconcilable differences with Estefan over the film's writer. Francis wanted to hire writer Robert L. Freedman, who had written the Emmy Award winning mini-series Life with Judy Garland: Me and My Shadows. Estefan, according to Francis, refused to consider him and the project collaboration thus ended.

Estefan appeared in the ABC television special Elmopalooza (which aired on 20 February 1998), in which she sang the song "Mambo, I, I, I". In April 2004, Estefan appeared on the Fox Broadcasting Company's program American Idol as a guest mentor for the contestants during Latin Week.

After campaigning heavily for the part on her social media accounts, Estefan was invited to guest star on the Fox television series Glee as the mother of cheerleader Santana Lopez (Naya Rivera). She also appeared as a mentor for the CW Network reality series The Next: Fame Is at Your Doorstep.

Estefan played Mirtha, the baby sister and nemesis of Lydia Margarita del Carmen Inclán Maribona Leyte-Vidal de Riera, in the first episode of season 3 of the Netflix series One Day at a Time.

In 2020, Estefan began co-hosting Red Table Talk: The Estefans, a spin-off of the Facebook Watch talk show Red Table Talk alongside her daughter Emily Estefan and niece Lili Estefan.

Estefan appeared in the film Father of The Bride (2022) alongside Andy Garcia and went on to voice the character of Marta Sandoval, a legendary singer on the verge of retirement, in the animated film Vivo. The film, which features songs by Lin-Manuel Miranda, was released in theaters and on Netflix in 2021. She then appeared in Gabby's Dollhouse: The Movie (2025).

=== Books ===
Estefan has written two children's books, The Magically Mysterious Adventures of Noelle the Bulldog (2005) and Noelle's Treasure Tale (2006). The latter book spent a week at No. 3 on the New York Times Bestseller list for children's books.

She also collaborated on a cookbook with her husband, entitled Estefan Kitchen, which was published in 2008. It contains 60 traditional Cuban recipes.

=== Other business ventures and appearances ===
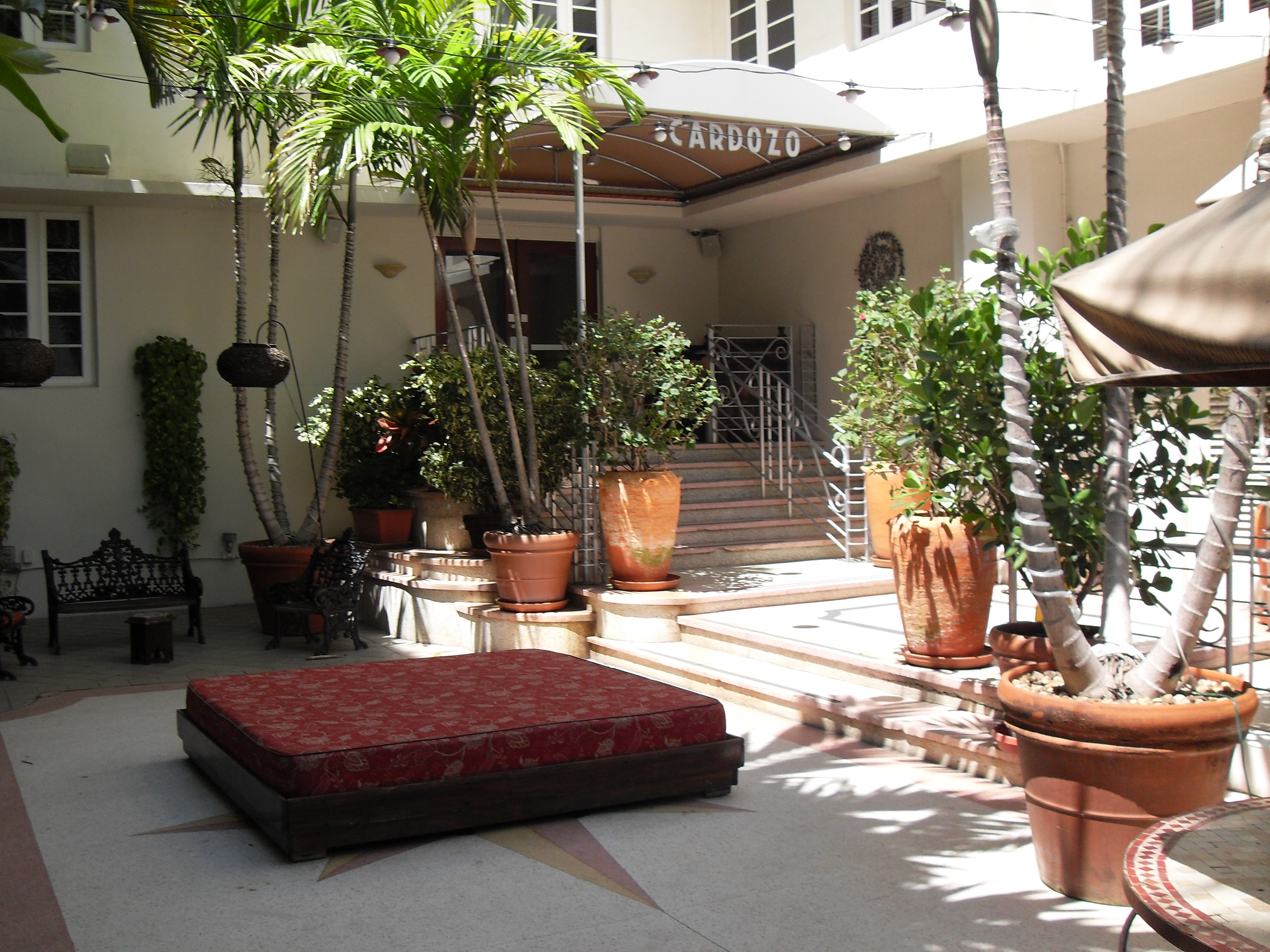
The Cardozo hotel on Ocean Drive, in Miami Beach, Florida

Gloria and Emilio Estefan have owned several business establishments, including several Cuban-themed restaurants (Bongos Cuban Café; Larios on the Beach). The restaurants are located in Miami Beach, downtown Miami (part of the American Airlines Arena), at the Seminole Hard Rock Hotel and Casino in Hollywood, Florida, Walt Disney World's Disney Springs in Orlando, Florida, and in Miami International Airport. They also own two hotels, Costa d'Este in Vero Beach, which opened in 2008, and The Cardozo in Miami Beach.

In August 2019, the Estefans closed their restaurant Bongos Cuban Cafe that had been located at Disney Springs at Walt Disney World for 22 years. The business was re-imagined as Estefan's Kitchen, which opened at the Sunset Walk at Margaritaville Resort Orlando in February 2020.

Estefan was appointed to the board of directors for Univision Communications Inc. in 2007. The Estefans' estimated net worth has been reported variously as between $500 and $700 million.

In June 2009, Estefan and her husband became the first Hispanics to buy a minor ownership stake in an NFL team, the Miami Dolphins.

She spoke at TEDx Via della Conciliazione on 19 April 2013, on the theme "Religious freedom today".

In December 2022, Estefan was a guest narrator at Disney's Candlelight Processional at Epcot, Walt Disney World.

Estefan and her husband Emilio Estefan voiced the characters Gloria and Emilio, radio hosts of Radio La Ola, in the 2026 video game Grand Theft Auto VI.

== Personal life ==
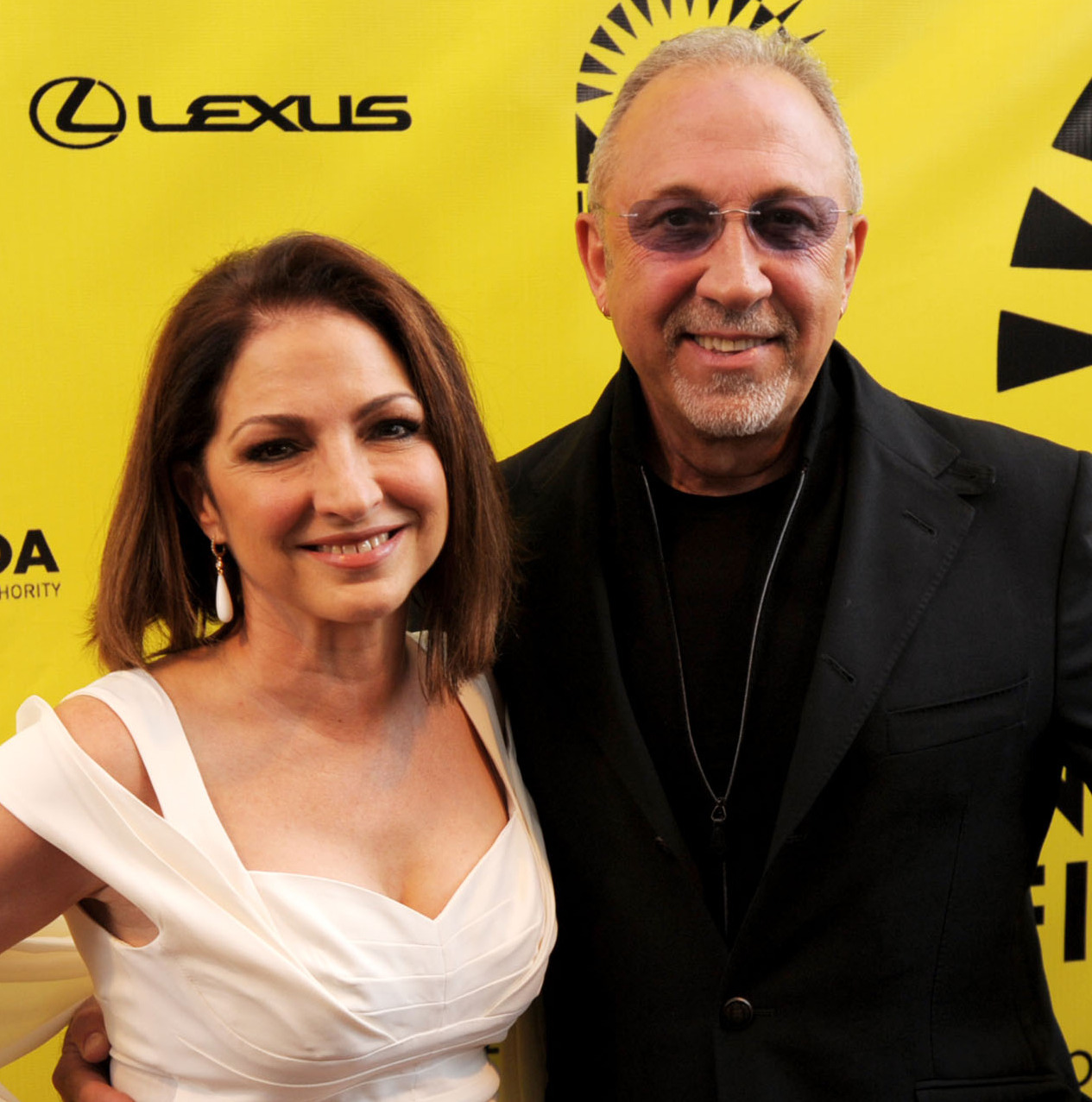
Gloria and Emilio Estefan at the 2014 Miami International Film Festival

Estefan became romantically involved with the Miami Sound Machine's band leader, Emilio Estefan, in 1976. She later revealed, "he was my first and only boyfriend". They married on 2 September 1978, and have a son, Nayib (born 2 September 1980), and a daughter, Emily (born 5 December 1994). Emily was conceived after Gloria's tour bus crash in 1990; doctors had told her she would not be able to have any more children. The family lives on Star Island in the city of Miami Beach.

Estefan's daughter, Emily, is a recording artist and her son, Nayib, is a filmmaker and owner of the Nite Owl Theater in Miami. In June 2012, Nayib's wife gave birth to a son, making Estefan a grandmother.

== Awards ==
In addition to her five Grammy Awards, Estefan has received many other awards. In May 1993, she received the Ellis Island Medal of Honor, which is the highest award that can be given to a naturalized U.S. citizen. She has won the Hispanic Heritage Award, an MTV Video Music Award, and the 1993 National Music Foundation's Humanitarian of the Year award. She is the recipient of the American Music Award for Lifetime Achievement.

She also has a star on the Hollywood Walk of Fame. Her husband, Emilio, a world-renowned music impresario, received a star which is adjacent to his wife's on the Hollywood Walk of Fame in 2005.

Estefan was awarded an honorary doctoral degree in music from the University of Miami in 1993. She was a member of the Board of Trustees of the University of Miami. In April 2014, Estefan was tapped into the Iron Arrow Honor Society, the University of Miami's highest honor society. In 2002, Barry University in Miami bestowed upon her an honorary law degree. She and her husband received honorary doctoral degrees in music from the Berklee College of Music in Boston in 2007. She delivered the commencement address to the 2007 graduating class.

In 2002, she received the Congressional Hispanic Caucus Institute Medallion of Excellence for Community Service. The singer was Musicares Person of the Year in 1994. She founded the Gloria Estefan Foundation, which promotes education, health and cultural development. In 1997, she received the Golden Plate Award of the American Academy of Achievement.

She has been honored twice by the Songwriters Hall of Fame. In 1992, she served as a public member of the U.S. Delegation to the 47th Session of the United Nations' General Assembly Opening Plenary.

Estefan received the Latin Recording Academy Person of the Year award at the Latin Grammy Awards in November 2008 in recognition of her twenty-five-year singing career. She is the first female singer to receive this award. She also received the Latin Grammy Award for Best Traditional Tropical Album for 90 Millas, and the Latin Grammy Award for Best Tropical Song for her single "Píntame De Colores". This established the first occasion for Estefan to ever win the Grammy Award for a song (either Latin or non-Latin). On 12 March 2009, Estefan was honored as a BMI Icon at the 16th annual BMI Latin Awards. Her catalog includes 22 BMI Latin and Pop Awards, along with 11 BMI Million-Air Awards.

In April 2010, Estefan and her husband received a star in the "Walk of Stars" in Las Vegas for their contribution to the music industry. On 28 April 2011, at the Latin Billboard Awards, Estefan was honored with the Billboard Spirit of Hope Award for her philanthropic work for the second time, the first being in 1996.

In 2014, Estefan and her husband received a Caribbean American Mover and Shakers Lifetime Achievement Award, for their contributions to the Hispanic and multicultural community. In November 2015, it was announced Estefan, along with her husband, would be awarded the Presidential Medal of Freedom by President Barack Obama for her contributions to American music.

In 2017, Estefan was made an honorary member of Sigma Alpha Iota International Music Fraternity, a music Greek organization for women with over 115 years of supporting music in their universities, organization and the world. She was initiated at the Sigma Chi Chapter at University of Miami.

In 2017, Estefan became the first Cuban American to be named as one of the Kennedy Center Honors. On 14 March 2019, Estefan and her husband were awarded the 2019 Library of Congress Gershwin Prize for Popular Song. They are the first married couple and first of Hispanic descent to receive the Gershwin Prize.

In 2022, Estefan was inducted into the Women Songwriters Hall of Fame.

In June 2023, Estefan was inducted into the Songwriters Hall of Fame, becoming the first Hispanic to do so.

In 2023 for her philanthropic commitment, the 44th annual Commonwealth Awards of Distinguished Service honored Estefan for her public service.

== Discography ==
- Cuts Both Ways (1989)
- Into the Light (1991)
- Mi Tierra (1993)
- Christmas Through Your Eyes (1993)
- Hold Me, Thrill Me, Kiss Me (1994)
- Abriendo Puertas (1995)
- Destiny (1996)
- Gloria! (1998)
- Alma Caribeña (2000)
- Unwrapped (2003)
- 90 Millas (2007)
- Miss Little Havana (2011)
- The Standards (2013)
- Brazil305 (2020)
- Estefan Family Christmas (2022)
- Raíces (2025)

== Filmography ==
Film
Year	Title	Role	Notes
1999	Music of the Heart	Isabel Vazquez	Debut acting performance
2000	Little Angelita	Voice Narrator	Animated short film
2003	Famous: The Making of Unwrapped	Herself	Album documentary
2007	90 Millas Documentary	Herself	Album documentary
2007	Your Mommy Kills Animals	Herself	Documentary
2008	Marley & Me	Herself	Cameo appearance
2009	G-Force	Juárez	Voice in the Latin-American version of the film
2010	Recording: The History Of Recorded Music	Herself	Documentary
2017	A Change of Heart	Dr. Farjado	
2021	Rita Moreno: Just a Girl Who Decided to Go for It	Herself	Documentary
2021	Vivo	Marta Sandoval (voice)	
2022	Father of the Bride	Ingrid Herrera	
2025	Gabby's Dollhouse: The Movie	Grandma Gigi	also voice
Television
Year	Title	Role	Notes
1986	Club Med		TV movie
1989	Postcard From... with Clive James	Herself	Episode: "Miami"
1993	The Hypnotic World of Paul McKenna	Herself	
1998	Blue's Clues	Herself	Episode: "Blue's Birthday"
2000	For Love or Country: The Arturo Sandoval Story	Emilia	Movie
2000	Frasier	Maria	Episode: "Something About Dr. Mary"
2005	A Capitol Fourth	Herself	
2006	The Chris Isaak Show	Herself	Episode: "A Little Help from My Friends"
2009	Kathy Griffin: My Life on the D-List	Herself	Episode: "Rosie and Gloria and Griffin... Oh My!"
2010	The Marriage Ref	Herself	One episode
2011	The X Factor	Herself	2 episodes
2012, 2015	Glee	Mrs. Maribel Lopez	Episodes: "Goodbye", "A Wedding"
2012	The Next: Fame Is at Your Doorstep	Herself	
2016	Jane the Virgin	Herself	
2018	Q85: A Musical Celebration for Quincy Jones	Herself	Singing a tribute to Quincy Jones
2018	Kennedy Center Honors	Herself	Host for the event
2019	One Day at a Time	Mirtha	
Video games
Year	Title	Role	Notes
2026	Grand Theft Auto VI	Gloria	

== Videography ==
- 1986: Video Éxitos (Unofficial release) L.D.L Enterprises
- 1989: Homecoming Concert CMV (US: Platinum)
- 1990: Evolution CMV (US: Platinum)
- 1991: Coming Out of the Dark SMV
- 1992: Into The Light World Tour SMV (US: Gold)
- 1995: Everlasting Gloria! EMV (US: Gold)
- 1996: The Evolution Tour Live in Miami EMV
- 1998: Don't Stop EMV
- 2001: Que siga la tradición EMV
- 2002: Live in Atlantis EMV
- 2003: Famous (Video journal about making the Unwrapped LP; included in CD package)
- 2004: Live & Unwrapped EMV
- 2007: 90 Millas: The Documentary (Video journal about making the 90 Millas LP; included in CD package)

== Bibliography ==
- 2005: The Magically Mysterious Adventures of Noelle the Bulldog ISBN 0-06-082623-1
- 2006: Noelle's Treasure Tale: A New Magically Mysterious Adventure ISBN 0060826231
- 2008: Estefan's Kitchen ISBN 045122518X

== See also ==
- List of best-selling Latin music artists
- List of best-selling music artists
- List of artists who reached number one on the Hot 100 (U.S.)
- List of artists who reached number one on the U.S. Dance chart
- List of refugees
- Pop Latino
- Women in Latin music
