= Betcha Say That =

Single by Gloria Estefan and Miami Sound Machine

from the album Let It Loose
- B-side: "Love Toy"
- Released: September 1, 1987
- Recorded: 1987
- Genre: Pop
- Length: 4:36 (Album Version); 3:40 (Single Remix); 7:20 (12" Version); 6:16 (Dub Version)
- Label: Epic
- Songwriters: Lawrence Dermer; Joe Galdo; Rafael Vigil
- Producers: Emilio & The Jerks (Emilio Estefan, Jr.) (Lawrence Dermer) (Joe Galdo) (Rafael Vigil)

Gloria Estefan and Miami Sound Machine singles chronology
"Rhythm Is Gonna Get You" (1987)	"Betcha Say That" (1987)	"Can't Stay Away from You" (1987)

"Betcha Say That" is a song from 1987 performed by Gloria Estefan and Miami Sound Machine from their 1987 album, Let It Loose. It was written by Larry Dermer, Joe Galdo and Rafael Vigil.

Released as the second single from Let It Loose, "Betcha Say That" was not among Estefan's bigger hits of the 1980s, peaking at #36 on the Billboard Hot 100 chart in October 1987. It was more successful on the Billboard adult contemporary chart, where the song reached #19. In the UK, the single was released in September 1987 and reached #192.

In the US, a single remix was released on 7", and an extended remix was released on a 12" single.

The song was not selected for inclusion on the singer's 1992 greatest hits album, but did appear on the limited "3.0" edition of The Essential Gloria Estefan.

== Formats and track listings ==
U.S. & Canada 7" Vinyl Single (34 07371) [September 1, 1987]
No.	Title	Writer(s)	Length
1.	"Betcha Say That" (Single Remix)	Lawrence Dermer, Joe Galdo, Rafael Vigil	3:40
2.	"Love Toy"	Lawrence Dermer, Joe Galdo, Rafael Vigil	4:29

U.S. 12" Vinyl Single (49 06962) [September 1, 1987]
No.	Title	Writer(s)	Length
1.	"Betcha Say That" (12" Version)	Lawrence Dermer, Joe Galdo, Rafael Vigil	7:20
2.	"Betcha Say That" (Dub Version)	Lawrence Dermer, Joe Galdo, Rafael Vigil	6:16

U.S. Promo CD Single (ESK 2789) [September 1987]
No.	Title	Writer(s)	Length
1.	"Betcha Say That" (Single Remix)	Lawrence Dermer, Joe Galdo, Rafael Vigil	3:40

U.S. Promo 7" Vinyl Single (34 07371) [September 1987]
No.	Title	Writer(s)	Length
1.	"Betcha Say That" (Single Remix)	Lawrence Dermer, Joe Galdo, Rafael Vigil	3:40
2.	"Betcha Say That" (Single Remix)	Lawrence Dermer, Joe Galdo, Rafael Vigil	3:40

Canada 12" Vinyl Single (12EXP-06962) [September 1987]
No.	Title	Writer(s)	Length
1.	"Betcha Say That" (12" Version)	Lawrence Dermer, Joe Galdo, Rafael Vigil	7:20
2.	"Betcha Say That" (Dub Version)	Lawrence Dermer, Joe Galdo, Rafael Vigil	6:16

Europe 7" Vinyl Single (EPC 651125 7) [October 1987]
No.	Title	Writer(s)	Length
1.	"Betcha Say That" (Single Remix)	Lawrence Dermer, Joe Galdo, Rafael Vigil	3:40
2.	"Love Toy"	Lawrence Dermer, Joe Galdo, Rafael Vigil	4:29

Europe 12" Vinyl Single (EPC 651125 6) [October 1987]
No.	Title	Writer(s)	Length
1.	"Betcha Say That" (12" Version)	Lawrence Dermer, Joe Galdo, Rafael Vigil	7:20
2.	"Betcha Say That" (Dub Version)	Lawrence Dermer, Joe Galdo, Rafael Vigil	6:16

Spain Promo 7" Vinyl Single (EPC 651125 7) [October 1987]
No.	Title	Writer(s)	Length
1.	"Betcha Say That" (Single Remix)	Lawrence Dermer, Joe Galdo, Rafael Vigil	3:40

U.K. 7" Vinyl Single (651125 7) [October 1987]
No.	Title	Writer(s)	Length
1.	"Betcha Say That" (Single Remix)	Lawrence Dermer, Joe Galdo, Rafael Vigil	3:40
2.	"Love Toy"	Lawrence Dermer, Joe Galdo, Rafael Vigil	4:29

U.K. 12" Vinyl Single #1 (651125 8) [October 1987]
No.	Title	Writer(s)	Length
1.	"Betcha Say That" (12" Version)	Lawrence Dermer, Joe Galdo, Rafael Vigil	7:20
2.	"Betcha Say That" (Dub Version)	Lawrence Dermer, Joe Galdo, Rafael Vigil	6:16
3.	"Love Toy"	Lawrence Dermer, Joe Galdo, Rafael Vigil	4:29

U.K. 12" Vinyl Single #2 (651125 9) [October 1987]
No.	Title	Writer(s)	Length
1.	"Betcha Say That" (Single Remix)	Lawrence Dermer, Joe Galdo, Rafael Vigil	3:40
2.	"Love Toy"	Lawrence Dermer, Joe Galdo, Rafael Vigil	4:29
3.	"The Megamix" (Rhythm Is Gonna Get You, Conga, Dr. Beat, Betcha Say That, Bad Boy)	Gloria M. Estefan, Enrique E. Garcia	9:59

Australia & New Zealand 7" Vinyl Single (651125 7)
No.	Title	Writer(s)	Length
1.	"Betcha Say That" (Single Remix)	Lawrence Dermer, Joe Galdo, Rafael Vigil	3:40
2.	"Love Toy"	Lawrence Dermer, Joe Galdo, Rafael Vigil	4:29

Australia & New Zealand 12" Vinyl Single (651125 6)
No.	Title	Writer(s)	Length
1.	"Betcha Say That" (12" Version)	Lawrence Dermer, Joe Galdo, Rafael Vigil	7:20
2.	"Betcha Say That" (Dub Version)	Lawrence Dermer, Joe Galdo, Rafael Vigil	6:16

Malaysia Promo 7" Vinyl Single (E 495)
No.	Title	Writer(s)	Length
1.	"Betcha Say That" (Single Remix)	Lawrence Dermer, Joe Galdo, Rafael Vigil	3:40
2.	"Rhythm Is Gonna Get You"	Gloria M. Estefan, Enrique E. Garcia	3:54

Philippines 7" Vinyl Single (ES-20132)
No.	Title	Writer(s)	Length
1.	"Betcha Say That" (Single Remix)	Lawrence Dermer, Joe Galdo, Rafael Vigil	3:40
2.	"You Made A Fool Of Me"	Wesley B. Wright	2:54

Philippines 12" Vinyl Single (CE-EP-18113 / 49-06962)
No.	Title	Writer(s)	Length
1.	"Betcha Say That" (12" Version)	Lawrence Dermer, Joe Galdo, Rafael Vigil	7:20
2.	"Betcha Say That" (Dub Version)	Lawrence Dermer, Joe Galdo, Rafael Vigil	6:16

Japan 7" Vinyl Single (07•5P-484) [October 1, 1987]
No.	Title	Writer(s)	Length
1.	"Betcha Say That" (Single Remix)	Lawrence Dermer, Joe Galdo, Rafael Vigil	3:40
2.	"Love Toy"	Lawrence Dermer, Joe Galdo, Rafael Vigil	4:29

Japan 12" Vinyl Single (12•3P-841) [October 1, 1987]
No.	Title	Writer(s)	Length
1.	"Betcha Say That" (12" Version)	Lawrence Dermer, Joe Galdo, Rafael Vigil	7:20
2.	"Betcha Say That" (Dub Version)	Lawrence Dermer, Joe Galdo, Rafael Vigil	6:16

== Official versions and remixes ==
Original versions

1. Album Version — (4:36)

Pablo Flores remixes

1. Single Remix — (3:40)
2. 12" Version (aka Extended Version) — (7:20)
3. Dub Version — (6:16)

== Release history ==
Region	Date
US	September 1, 1987
Europe	October 1987
UK	October 1987
Japan	October 1, 1987

== Charts ==
Chart (1987)	Peak position
Canada Top Singles (RPM)	37
Canada Adult Contemporary (RPM)	16
New Zealand (Recorded Music NZ)	50
US Billboard Hot 100	36
US Adult Contemporary (Billboard)	19
US R&R AC Top 30	25
