= Can't Stay Away from You =

Single by Gloria Estefan and Miami Sound Machine

from the album Let It Loose
- B-side: "Let It Loose"
- Released: November 10, 1987
- Recorded: 1987
- Genre: Pop
- Length: 4:00
- Label: Epic
- Songwriter: Gloria Estefan
- Producers: Emilio & The Jerks; (Emilio Estefan, Jr.; Lawrence Dermer; Joe Galdo; Rafael Vigil)

Gloria Estefan and Miami Sound Machine singles chronology
"Betcha Say That" (1987)	"Can't Stay Away from You" (1987)	"Anything for You" (1988)

Music video
- "Can't Stay Away from You" on YouTube

"Can't Stay Away from You" is a song by Gloria Estefan and Miami Sound Machine. The song was released in November 1987 by Epic as the third single from their multi-platinum album, Let It Loose (1987). It became the group's fifth top 10 hit in the United States, peaking at #6 on the US Billboard Hot 100 chart; it was their second #1 hit on the adult contemporary chart, following 1986's "Words Get in the Way". The song originally peaked at #88 on the UK Singles Chart in May 1988, however the song was re-released after the success of its follow-up, "Anything for You", peaking at #7 in March 1989.

The song is a pensive ballad sung from the perspective of a woman who is in love with someone who doesn't feel the same, but she is unwilling to walk away from their relationship because she does not want it to end. The European single contains as a bonus cut a remixed version of "Surrender", an album cut from "Let It Loose", which Estefan performed on "Solid Gold".

Popular Latin singer Jaci Velasquez recorded a Spanish version of the song called "Mi Vida No Es Nada Sin Ti" for her album Milagro.

The song appeared in 1988 episodes of the soap operas Another World and The Young and the Restless.

== Critical reception ==
AllMusic editor Jon O'Brien described the song as "haunting". Kris Kirk from British magazine Melody Maker wrote that Estefan perhaps will "finally go UK gold" with this "beautifully-performed" ballad. In an ironic review of 4 February 1989 the Phil Cheeseman, reviewer of Record Mirror, chided the song for lack of class to match the previous own work and described it as a "wearisome ballad". Stuart Maconie of New Musical Express echoed by saying "Have you noticed how the billing of the Sound Machine gets progressively tinier whilst Gloria becomes correspondingly more prominent?" and made a forecast that MSM will "vanish entirely from this earth" soon.

== Charts and certifications ==
=== Weekly charts ===
Chart (1988)	Peak position
Australia (Kent Music Report)	98
UK Singles (OCC)	88
US Billboard Hot 100	6
US Adult Contemporary (Billboard)	1

Chart (1989)	Peak position
Australia (ARIA)	60
Belgium (Ultratop 50 Flanders)	1
Europe (European Hot 100 Singles)	21
Finland (Suomen virallinen lista)	15
Ireland (IRMA)	7
Netherlands (Dutch Top 40)	1
Netherlands (Single Top 100)	1
UK Singles (OCC)	7

=== Year-end charts ===
Chart (1988)	Position
US Billboard Hot 100	90

Chart (1989)	Position
Belgium (Ultratop Flanders)	20
Netherlands (Dutch Top 40)	19
Netherlands (Single Top 100)	14

=== Certifications ===
Country	Certification
Netherlands	Gold

== Formats and track listings ==
US & Canada 7" Vinyl Single (34 07641) [November 10, 1987]
No.	Title	Writer(s)	Length
1.	"Can't Stay Away From You"	Gloria M. Estefan	3:56
2.	"Let It Loose"	Lawrence Dermer, Joe Galdo, Rafael Vigil	2:51

US Promo 7" Vinyl Single (34 07641) [November 1987]
No.	Title	Writer(s)	Length
1.	"Can't Stay Away From You"	Gloria M. Estefan	3:56
2.	"Can't Stay Away From You"	Gloria M. Estefan	3:56

US 7" Vinyl Single (Epic Collectables) [15 73938] {1991 Reissue}
No.	Title	Writer(s)	Length
1.	"Can't Stay Away From You"	Gloria M. Estefan	3:56
2.	"Let It Loose"	Lawrence Dermer, Joe Galdo, Rafael Vigil	2:51

Europe 3" CD-Maxi Single (EPC 651444 2) [May 1988]
No.	Title	Writer(s)	Length
1.	"Can't Stay Away From You"	Gloria M. Estefan	3:56
2.	"Rhythm Is Gonna Get You"	Gloria M. Estefan, Enrique E. Garcia	3:54
3.	"Surrender" (Remixed Version)	Lawrence Dermer, Joe Galdo, Rafael Vigil	6:28

Europe 7" Vinyl Single (EPC 651444 7) [May 1988]
No.	Title	Writer(s)	Length
1.	"Can't Stay Away From You"	Gloria M. Estefan	3:56
2.	"Let It Loose"	Lawrence Dermer, Joe Galdo, Rafael Vigil	2:51

Europe 12" Vinyl Single (EPC 651444 6) [May 1988]
No.	Title	Writer(s)	Length
1.	"Can't Stay Away From You"	Gloria M. Estefan	3:56
2.	"Let It Loose"	Lawrence Dermer, Joe Galdo, Rafael Vigil	2:51
3.	"Surrender" (Remixed Version)	Lawrence Dermer, Joe Galdo, Rafael Vigil	6:28

UK 7" Vinyl Single (651444 7) [May 1988]
No.	Title	Writer(s)	Length
1.	"Can't Stay Away From You"	Gloria M. Estefan	3:56
2.	"Let It Loose"	Lawrence Dermer, Joe Galdo, Rafael Vigil	2:51

UK 7" Vinyl Single (Limited edition with colour poster) [651444 0] {May 1988}
No.	Title	Writer(s)	Length
1.	"Can't Stay Away From You"	Gloria M. Estefan	3:56
2.	"Let It Loose"	Lawrence Dermer, Joe Galdo, Rafael Vigil	2:51

UK 12" Vinyl Single #1 (651444 8) [May 1988]
No.	Title	Writer(s)	Length
1.	"Can't Stay Away From You"	Gloria M. Estefan	3:56
2.	"Let It Loose"	Lawrence Dermer, Joe Galdo, Rafael Vigil	2:51
3.	"Primitive Love"	Lawrence Dermer, Joe Galdo, Rafael Vigil	4:41

UK 12" Vinyl Single #2 (651444 9) [May 1988]
No.	Title	Writer(s)	Length
1.	"Can't Stay Away From You"	Gloria M. Estefan	3:56
2.	"Let It Loose"	Lawrence Dermer, Joe Galdo, Rafael Vigil	2:51
3.	"Bad Boy" (Club Mix)	Lawrence Dermer, Joe Galdo, Rafael Vigil	4:42

UK CD-Maxi Single (653195 2) [February 1989]
No.	Title	Writer(s)	Length
1.	"Can't Stay Away From You"	Gloria M. Estefan	3:56
2.	"Let It Loose"	Lawrence Dermer, Joe Galdo, Rafael Vigil	2:51
3.	"Primitive Love"	Lawrence Dermer, Joe Galdo, Rafael Vigil	4:41

UK 7" Vinyl Single (651444 7) [February 1989]
No.	Title	Writer(s)	Length
1.	"Can't Stay Away From You"	Gloria M. Estefan	3:56
2.	"Let It Loose"	Lawrence Dermer, Joe Galdo, Rafael Vigil	2:51

UK 7" Vinyl Single (Limited edition shaped picture disc) [653195 7] {February 1989}
No.	Title	Writer(s)	Length
1.	"Can't Stay Away From You"	Gloria M. Estefan	3:56
2.	"Let It Loose"	Lawrence Dermer, Joe Galdo, Rafael Vigil	2:51

UK 7" Vinyl Single (Limited edition posterbag) [653195 0] {February 1989}
No.	Title	Writer(s)	Length
1.	"Can't Stay Away From You"	Gloria M. Estefan	3:56
2.	"Let It Loose"	Lawrence Dermer, Joe Galdo, Rafael Vigil	2:51

UK 12" Vinyl Single (Limited edition uncut picture disc) [653195 7] {February 1989}
No.	Title	Writer(s)	Length
1.	"Can't Stay Away From You"	Gloria M. Estefan	3:56
2.	"Let It Loose"	Lawrence Dermer, Joe Galdo, Rafael Vigil	2:51

UK 12" Vinyl Single (653195 8) [February 1989]
No.	Title	Writer(s)	Length
1.	"Can't Stay Away From You"	Gloria M. Estefan	3:56
2.	"Let It Loose"	Lawrence Dermer, Joe Galdo, Rafael Vigil	2:51
3.	"Primitive Love"	Lawrence Dermer, Joe Galdo, Rafael Vigil	4:41

Australia & New Zealand 7" Vinyl Single (651444 7) [1989]
No.	Title	Writer(s)	Length
1.	"Can't Stay Away From You"	Gloria M. Estefan	3:56
2.	"Let It Loose"	Lawrence Dermer, Joe Galdo, Rafael Vigil	2:51

Australia 7" Vinyl Single (Limited edition posterbag) [651444 0] {1989}
No.	Title	Writer(s)	Length
1.	"Can't Stay Away From You"	Gloria M. Estefan	3:56
2.	"Let It Loose"	Lawrence Dermer, Joe Galdo, Rafael Vigil	2:51

Philippines 7" Vinyl Single (ES-20135 / 34 07641)
No.	Title	Writer(s)	Length
1.	"Can't Stay Away From You"	Gloria M. Estefan	3:56
2.	"Let It Loose"	Lawrence Dermer, Joe Galdo, Rafael Vigil	2:51

Japan 7" Vinyl Single (07•5P-496) [January 21, 1988]
No.	Title	Writer(s)	Length
1.	"Can't Stay Away From You"	Gloria M. Estefan	3:56
2.	"Let It Loose"	Lawrence Dermer, Joe Galdo, Rafael Vigil	2:51

Europe 3" CD-Maxi Single (Solid Gold) [EPC 654854 3] {1989}
No.	Title	Writer(s)	Length
1.	"Can't Stay Away From You"	Gloria M. Estefan	3:56
2.	"Dr. Beat"	Enrique E. Garcia	4:23
3.	"Conga" (Remixed Version)	Enrique E. Garcia	4:14

Australia CD-Maxi Single (Solid Gold) [654854 2] {1989}
No.	Title	Writer(s)	Length
1.	"Can't Stay Away From You"	Gloria M. Estefan	3:56
2.	"Dr. Beat"	Enrique E. Garcia	4:23
3.	"Conga" (Remixed Version)	Enrique E. Garcia	4:14

Australia Cassette-Maxi Single (Solid Gold) [654854 4] {1989}
No.	Title	Writer(s)	Length
1.	"Can't Stay Away From You"	Gloria M. Estefan	3:56
2.	"Dr. Beat"	Enrique E. Garcia	4:23
3.	"Conga" (Remixed Version)	Enrique E. Garcia	4:14

== Official versions ==
Original versions

1. Album Version — (3:56)

== Release history ==
Region	Date
US	November 10, 1987
Japan	January 21, 1988
Europe	May 1988
UK	May 1988
UK (Rerelease)	February 1989

== See also ==
- List of number-one adult contemporary singles of 1988 (U.S.)
