= Don't Let This Moment End =

Single by Gloria Estefan

from the album Gloria!
- Released: November 3, 1998
- Recorded: 1997–1998
- Genre: Dance-pop; disco; house
- Length: 4:42
- Label: Epic Records
- Songwriters: Gloria Estefan; Emilio Estefan; Lawrence Dermer; Roberto Blades
- Producers: Estefan Jr.; Dermer

Gloria Estefan singles chronology
"Cuba Libre" (1998)	"Don't Let This Moment End" (1998)	"Santo Santo" (1999)

Music video
- "Don't Let This Moment End" on YouTube

"Don't Let This Moment End" is a song by Cuban-American singer and songwriter Gloria Estefan. It was released on November 3, 1998 by Epic Records, as the third single in the United States, the third in the United Kingdom, and her fourth globally, from her eighth album, Gloria! (1998). The song was written by Estefan, her husband Emilio Estefan, Lawrence Dermer and Roberto Blades and produced by Estefan Jr. and Dermer. It became a smash hit on the US Billboard Hot Dance Club Play chart, almost peaking at the top of charts for that field. The song also peaked at number nine in Spain and was a top-30 hit in the UK. It was first intended as a ballad and then remixed into a dance-ballad. According to Estefan, it celebrates the perfect moment in time. Its music video was directed by Gustavo Garzon, depicting Estefan performing in a nightclub. The track was nominated for a Grammy Music Award, but lost to "Believe" by Cher.

"Don't Let This Moment End" also appears on two of Estefan's compilation albums; The Very Best of Gloria Estefan in 2006 and The Essential Gloria Estefan in 2006.

== Background and release ==
A passion that's so special you want it to keep going on forever. It's like the euphoria of being in a club, of sex, love, being outdoors, and asking for those feelings to go on forever.

— Gloria Estefan talking about the song.

"Don't Let This Moment End" was written by Emilio and Gloria Estefan with Lawrence Dermer and Rubén Blades, and produced by Estefan Jr., Dermer and Tony Moran. It was released on November 3, 1998 in two languages; English and French. The title of the song in French is "Que Ça Ne Finisse Jamais" ("May it Never End") and is only available on the European edition of the album as a bonus track. The song was actually first recorded as a ballad, but then it was remixed into a dance-ballad by Pablo Flores. The ballad version can be found on the CD maxi releases.

Thematically, the track celebrates the perfect moment in time. The moment you want to last forever. It has been remixed for clubs by the likes of Paul Andrews, Hex Hector, Messy Boys, Mousse T. and Steven Nikolas. Estefan was nominated for the second consecutive time for a Grammy Music Award for "Best Dance Recording" with the single, but lost to Cher's smash hit "Believe". Estefan performed "Don't Let This Moment End" on the American daytime variety television talk show The Rosie O'Donnell Show in 1999.

The B-side to the single was the "70's Moment Medley" recorded especially for this single release, on which Estefan sang covers of disco songs. On that medley Estefan included: "I Thought It Took a Little Time", "If I Can't Have You", "This Time Baby", "Don't Leave Me This Way", "Never Can Say Goodbye", "Don't Let This Moment End".

On June 3, 2022, Estefan released the "Don't Let This Moment End" EP to all digital and streaming outlets.

== Critical reception ==
Upon the release, J.D. Considine from The Baltimore Sun concluded that 15 years ago, Donna Summer "would have killed for a single as strong" as "Don't Let This Moment End". Gregg Shapiro from Bay Area Reporter remarked its "retro-disco feel". Ben Wener from Beaver County Times stated that the thumping 180 bpm are "yielding perfectly to the [song's] hyperactive melodrama". Larry Flick from Billboard magazine wrote, "In its original form, the song is a sweeping, string-laden anthem that sounds like it was plucked from a DJ playlist circa 1977. Not surprisingly, La Glo delivers a performance that gives wannabes a reason to pause and take notes. [...] Prepare to gag with utter glee." Another Billboard editor, Chuck Taylor, complimented the song as "wildly joyous with a series of immediate musical hooks", viewing it as an "inspirational ode to the beauty of that perfect moment in time". Steve Morse from Boston Globe remarked the song's "positive messages amid vintage dance beats". The Daily Vault's Alfredo Narvaez named it a "very pretty" song. Ealing Leader stated that here, Estefan "could have another hit on her hands". Joey Guerra from Houston Chronicle found that it "rides an urgent wave of unabashed glitter-ball drama." Kerry Gold from The Vancouver Sun said Estefan "lets loose on her hyper-rhythmic brand of disco salsa". In a 2018 retrospective review, Quentin Harrison from Albumism described the song as "modern disco".

== Music video ==
The accompanying music video of "Don't Let This Moment End" premiered on November 3, 1998 and was directed by Argentinian director Gustavo Garzon. It features Estefan as a disco diva at a nightclub, reminiscent of the famed Studio 54. In the video she appears in three different styles and looks.

In the beginning Estefan is seen arriving at the club in a limousine. Photographers outside the club are waiting for her and she poses for them in a diva manner. At the same time a mysterious man with black sunglasses is entering. Inside the club Estefan starts singing, with a '70s disco look including big teased hair. People are dancing everywhere around her. There are disco balls and soap bubbles. In the middle of the video she wears a golden dress and her hair is shortened a bit. The man with sunglasses is seen in the crowd of dancing people and apparently Estefan is looking for him. But they never appear together in the video. Towards the end of the video, Estefan again changes her look, appearing in a sleeveless dress. Sparkling rays of laser are lighting up the club. The man leaves and Estefan is seen leaving the club shortly after. Again she poses for the photographers waiting outside.

== Track listing ==
12" single, US (1998)
No.	Title	Length
1.	"Don't Let This Moment End" (Nikolas & Sibley's "Having A Moment" Mix)	10:55
2.	"Don't Let This Moment End" (Messy Boys Remix)	7:00
3.	"Don't Let This Moment End" (Hex Hector Dub)	9:31
4.	"Oye" (Data-Flash Dub)	8:11

CD single, US (1998)
No.	Title	Length
1.	"Don't Let This Moment End" (Radio Edit)	4:05
2.	"Don't Let This Moment End" (Ballad Version)	4:20
3.	"Don't Let This Moment End" (7" Remix Edit)	4:31
4.	"Don't Let This Moment End" (N&S Miami Remix Edit)	4:45
5.	"The 70's "Moment" Medley"	5:30

CD maxi, US (1998)
No.	Title	Length
1.	"Don't Let This Moment End" (Radio Edit)	4:05
2.	"Don't Let This Moment End" (Ballad Version)	4:20
3.	"Don't Let This Moment End" (7" Remix Edit)	4:31
4.	"Don't Let This Moment End" (N&S Miami Remix Edit)	4:45
5.	"Don't Let This Moment End" (NY:PD Radio Mix)	4:46
6.	"Don't Let This Moment End" (Hex Hector 12" Vocal Mix)	11:01
7.	"Don't Let This Moment End" (Nikolas & Sibley "Having A Moment" Mix)	10:55
8.	"Oye" (Rosabel's Cubarican Club Mix)	9:55
9.	"The 70's "Moment" Medley"	15:30

12" single, Europe (1999)
No.	Title	Length
1.	"Don't Let This Moment End" (Hex Hector 12" Vocal Mix)	11:01
2.	"Don't Let This Moment End" (NY:PD Radio Mix)	4:46
3.	"Don't Let This Moment End" (Sharp "Master Blaster" Remix)	8:11
4.	"The 70's "Moment" Medley"	16:13

CD maxi, Europe (1999)
No.	Title	Length
1.	"Don't Let This Moment End" (Radio Edit)	4:05
2.	"Don't Let This Moment End" (Ballad Version)	4:20
3.	"The 70's "Moment" Medley" (Edit)	5:39

== Charts ==
Chart (1998)	Peak position
Canada (Canadian Hot 100)	64
Scotland (OCC)	34
Spain (AFYVE)	9
UK Singles (OCC)	27
US Billboard Hot 100	76
US Hot Adult Contemporary (Billboard)	30
US Hot Dance Club Play (Billboard)	2
US Hot Dance Music/Maxi-Singles Sales (Billboard)	4

== Official versions and remixes ==
Original Versions

1. Album Version — (4:42)
2. Radio Edit — (4:09)
3. Ballad Version — (4:15)
4. French Version ("Que Ça Ne Finisse Jamais") — (4:42)

Remixes

1. Hex Hector 12" Vocal Mix — (11:01)
2. Hex Hector 7" Remix Edit — (4:31)
3. Hex Hector Dub — (9:31)
4. Hex Hector Acapella — (4:15)
5. Mousse T. Club Mix — (7:53)
6. Mousse T. Radio Edit — (4:19)
7. NY:PD Moving Violation Mix — (8:48)
8. NY:PD Radio Mix — (4:48)
9. NY:PD Off Duty Dub — (9:50)
10. Nikolas & Sibley "Having A Moment" Mix — (10:46)
11. Nikolas & Sibley Miami Remix Edit — (4:45)
12. Nikolas & Sibley Bonus Beats — (4:29)
13. Nikolas & Sibley "Never Leave Hooker" Dub — (7:38)
14. Messy Boys Remix — (6:52)
15. Messy Boys Dub — (5:28)
16. John "00" Flemming & Chris Daniels Mix — (7:58)
17. Sharp "Master Blaster" Remix — (8:07)

== Covers ==
- The song was covered by Dj Carlos Gallardo with vocals of Rebeka Brow in 2009, their version went to the Spanish chart to the Top Ten, surpassing Estefan's original version.
