= Falling in Love (Uh-Oh) =

Single by Miami Sound Machine

from the album Primitive Love
- B-side: "Primitive Love"
- Released: October 1986
- Recorded: 1985
- Genre: Pop
- Length: 3:58 (album version); 3:07 (single remix); 6:07 (extended remix); 5:18 (dub version)
- Label: Epic
- Songwriters: Lawrence Dermer; Joe Galdo; Rafael Vigil
- Producer: Emilio Estefan, Jr.

Miami Sound Machine singles chronology
"Words Get in the Way" (1986)	"Falling in Love (Uh-Oh)" (1986)	"Rhythm Is Gonna Get You" (1987)

"Falling in Love (Uh-Oh)" is the fourth single released by the American band Miami Sound Machine led by Gloria Estefan from their second English language album, and ninth studio album overall, Primitive Love.

== Formats and track listings ==
U.S. and Canada 7" vinyl single (34 06352)
No.	Title	Writer(s)	Length
1.	"Falling in Love (Uh-Oh)" (single remix)	Lawrence Dermer; Joe Galdo; Rafael Vigil	3:07
2.	"Primitive Love"	Lawrence Dermer; Joe Galdo; Rafael Vigil	4:42

U.S. promo 7" vinyl single (34 06352)
No.	Title	Writer(s)	Length
1.	"Falling in Love (Uh-Oh)" (single remix)	Lawrence Dermer; Joe Galdo; Rafael Vigil	3:07
2.	"Falling in Love (Uh-Oh)" (single remix)	Lawrence Dermer; Joe Galdo; Rafael Vigil	3:07

U.S. 12" vinyl single (49 05966)
No.	Title	Writer(s)	Length
1.	"Falling in Love (Uh-Oh)" (extended remix)	Lawrence Dermer; Joe Galdo; Rafael Vigil	6:07
2.	"Falling in Love (Uh-Oh)" (dub version)	Lawrence Dermer; Joe Galdo; Rafael Vigil	5:18

Canada 12" vinyl single (12EXP-05966)
No.	Title	Writer(s)	Length
1.	"Falling in Love (Uh-Oh)" (extended remix)	Lawrence Dermer; Joe Galdo; Rafael Vigil	6:07
2.	"Falling in Love (Uh-Oh)" (dub version)	Lawrence Dermer; Joe Galdo; Rafael Vigil	5:18

Europe 7" vinyl single (EPC A 7257)
No.	Title	Writer(s)	Length
1.	"Falling in Love (Uh-Oh)" (single remix)	Lawrence Dermer; Joe Galdo; Rafael Vigil	3:07
2.	"Surrender Paradise"	Suzi Carr; Lawrence Dermer; Joe Galdo	4:48

Europe 12" vinyl single (EPC A 12.7257)
No.	Title	Writer(s)	Length
1.	"Falling in Love (Uh-Oh)" (extended remix)	Lawrence Dermer; Joe Galdo; Rafael Vigil	6:07
2.	"Surrender Paradise"	Suzi Carr; Lawrence Dermer; Joe Galdo	4:48

U.K. 7" vinyl single No. 1 (A 6956)
No.	Title	Writer(s)	Length
1.	"Falling in Love (Uh-Oh)" (album version)	Lawrence Dermer; Joe Galdo; Rafael Vigil	3:58
2.	"Surrender Paradise"	Suzi Carr; Lawrence Dermer; Joe Galdo	4:50

U.K. 7" vinyl single No. 2 (650251 7)
No.	Title	Writer(s)	Length
1.	"Falling in Love (Uh-Oh)" (single remix)	Lawrence Dermer; Joe Galdo; Rafael Vigil	3:07
2.	"Surrender Paradise"	Suzi Carr; Lawrence Dermer; Joe Galdo	4:50

U.K. 12" vinyl single No. 1 (TA 6956)
No.	Title	Writer(s)	Length
1.	"Falling in Love (Uh-Oh)" (album version)	Lawrence Dermer; Joe Galdo; Rafael Vigil	3:58
2.	"Conga" (The Stronga-Conga remix)	Enrique E. Garcia	4:24
3.	"Surrender Paradise"	Suzi Carr; Lawrence Dermer; Joe Galdo	4:50

U.K. 12" vinyl single No. 2 (QTA 6956)
No.	Title	Writer(s)	Length
1.	"Falling in Love (Uh-Oh)" (extended remix)	Lawrence Dermer; Joe Galdo; Rafael Vigil	6:07
2.	"Falling in Love (Uh-Oh)" (single remix)	Lawrence Dermer; Joe Galdo; Rafael Vigil	3:07
3.	"Surrender Paradise"	Suzi Carr; Lawrence Dermer; Joe Galdo	4:50

U.K. 12" vinyl single No. 2 (Limited edition double pak) [DTA 6956]
No.	Title	Writer(s)	Length
1.	"Falling in Love (Uh-Oh)" (extended remix)	Lawrence Dermer; Joe Galdo; Rafael Vigil	6:07
2.	"Falling in Love (Uh-Oh)" (single remix)	Lawrence Dermer; Joe Galdo; Rafael Vigil	3:07
3.	"Surrender Paradise"	Suzi Carr; Lawrence Dermer; Joe Galdo	4:50

U.K. 12" vinyl single No. 3 (650251 6)
No.	Title	Writer(s)	Length
1.	"Falling in Love (Uh-Oh)" (extended remix)	Lawrence Dermer; Joe Galdo; Rafael Vigil	6:07
2.	"Falling in Love (Uh-Oh)" (dub version)	Lawrence Dermer; Joe Galdo; Rafael Vigil	5:18
3.	"Surrender Paradise"	Suzi Carr; Lawrence Dermer; Joe Galdo	4:50

Australia 7" vinyl single (650251 7)
No.	Title	Writer(s)	Length
1.	"Falling in Love (Uh-Oh)" (single remix)	Lawrence Dermer; Joe Galdo; Rafael Vigil	3:07
2.	"Surrender Paradise"	Suzi Carr; Lawrence Dermer; Joe Galdo	4:50

Australia 12" vinyl single (650251 6)
No.	Title	Writer(s)	Length
1.	"Falling in Love (Uh-Oh)" (extended remix)	Lawrence Dermer; Joe Galdo; Rafael Vigil	6:07
2.	"Falling in Love (Uh-Oh)" (dub version)	Lawrence Dermer; Joe Galdo; Rafael Vigil	5:18
3.	"Surrender Paradise"	Suzi Carr; Lawrence Dermer; Joe Galdo	4:50

New Zealand 7" vinyl single (ES 1193)
No.	Title	Writer(s)	Length
1.	"Falling in Love (Uh-Oh)" (single remix)	Lawrence Dermer; Joe Galdo; Rafael Vigil	3:07
2.	"Primitive Love"	Lawrence Dermer; Joe Galdo; Rafael Vigil	4:42

South Africa 7" vinyl single (EN 5996)
No.	Title	Writer(s)	Length
1.	"Falling in Love (Uh-Oh)" (single remix)	Lawrence Dermer; Joe Galdo; Rafael Vigil	3:07
2.	"Primitive Love"	Lawrence Dermer; Joe Galdo; Rafael Vigil	4:42

Philippines 12" vinyl single (CE-EP-18070/49 05966)
No.	Title	Writer(s)	Length
1.	"Falling in Love (Uh-Oh)" (extended remix)	Lawrence Dermer; Joe Galdo; Rafael Vigil	6:07
2.	"Falling in Love (Uh-Oh)" (dub version)	Lawrence Dermer; Joe Galdo; Rafael Vigil	5:18

Japan 7" vinyl single (07•5P-443)
No.	Title	Writer(s)	Length
1.	"Falling in Love (Uh-Oh)" (single remix)	Lawrence Dermer; Joe Galdo; Rafael Vigil	3:07
2.	"Primitive Love"	Lawrence Dermer; Joe Galdo; Rafael Vigil	4:42

Japan 12" vinyl single (12•3P-791)
No.	Title	Writer(s)	Length
1.	"Falling in Love (Uh-Oh)" (extended remix)	Lawrence Dermer; Joe Galdo; Rafael Vigil	6:07
2.	"Falling in Love (Uh-Oh)" (dub version)	Lawrence Dermer; Joe Galdo; Rafael Vigil	5:18

== Official versions and remixes ==
Original versions

1. Album version — (3:56)

Pablo Flores remixes

1. Single remix — (3:07)
2. Extended remix — (6:07)
3. Dub version — (5:18)

== Release history ==
Region	Date
U.S.	October 1986
Europe	July 1986
U.K.	July 1986
Japan	November 21, 1986

== Chart performance ==
Chart (1986–1987)	Peak position
U.S. Billboard Hot 100 Singles	25
U.S. Billboard Adult Contemporary Tracks	3
US Cashbox Top 100	23
U.S. R&R AC Top 30	3
Belgium (Flanders)	22
Belgium (Wallonie)	14
Netherlands	26
U.K.	89
