= Anything for You (Gloria Estefan and Miami Sound Machine song) =

1988 single by Gloria Estefan

- Standard artwork variant

Single by Gloria Estefan and Miami Sound Machine

from the album Let It Loose
- B-side: "No Te Olvidaré" (Anything for You – Spanish version)
- Released: March 1988
- Recorded: 1987
- Genre: Pop
- Length: 4:02 (single/video version); 3:41 (album version); 4:02 (Spanish version); 4:03 (English/Spanish version)
- Label: Epic; CBS Discos International
- Songwriter: Gloria M. Estefan
- Producer: Emilio Estefan Jr.

Gloria Estefan and Miami Sound Machine singles chronology
"Can't Stay Away from You" (1987)	"Anything for You" (1988)	"1-2-3" (1988)

Music video
- "Anything For You" on YouTube

"Anything for You" is a ballad song written by Cuban-American singer and songwriter Gloria Estefan. The song was released in March 1988, as the fourth single from their tenth studio album, Let It Loose (1987). After years of fluctuating success in the United States, "Anything for You" marked a breakthrough for the group when it topped the Billboard magazine Hot 100 chart on May 14, 1988, and remained there for two weeks. It was the first of three number-ones for Estefan. Due to the success of the single, the album was re-released outside North America, under the title, Anything For You. The song also spent three weeks at #1 on the Adult Contemporary chart and peaked at #3 on the Hot Latin Tracks on June 25, 1988.

In the UK, "Anything for You" was released in July 1988 and entered at #87, beginning a steady twelve-week climb which peaked at #10 by September 1988.

== Background ==
The A-side of the single contained a longer fade than the version on the album. The B-side of the single was a Spanglish version of the song, with Estefan alternating the verses and chorus between English and Spanish. The song also appeared on the compilation album Exitos de Gloria Estefan, sung completely in Spanish and retitled "No Te Olvidaré (I Won't Forget You)." The song was re-released in its original form in The Essential Gloria Estefan and in a slightly extended version in Gloria Estefan Greatest Hits (the 7" single version).

== Critical reception ==
Pan-European magazine Music & Media described the song as "a glowing and highly atmospheric ballad in a glamorous production."

== Music video ==
The music video for "Anything for You" was directed by Maurice Phillips.

== Charts and certifications ==
=== Weekly charts ===
Chart (1988–1989)	Peak position
Australia (ARIA)	11
Belgium (Ultratop 50 Flanders)	5
Europe (European Hot 100 Singles)	40
Ireland (IRMA)	19
Italy Airplay (Music & Media)	20
Netherlands (Dutch Top 40)	2
Netherlands (Single Top 100)	2
UK Singles (Official Charts)	10
US Billboard Hot 100	1
US Adult Contemporary (Billboard)	1
US Hot Latin Songs (Billboard) "No Te Olvidaré"	3

=== Year-end charts ===
Chart (1988)	Position
US Billboard Hot 100	13

Chart (1989)	Position
Belgium (Ultratop Flanders)	51
Netherlands (Dutch Top 40)	49
Netherlands (Single Top 100)	26

=== Certifications ===
Region	Certification	Certified units/sales
United States (RIAA)	Gold	500,000^{^}
^{^} Shipments figures based on certification alone.

== Official versions ==
Original versions

1. Album Version — (3:42)
2. Single/Video Version — (4:02)
3. Spanish Version ("No Te Olvidaré") — (4:02)
4. English/Spanish Version — (4:03)

== Release history ==
Region	Date
US	March 1988
Japan	May 21, 1988
UK	June 1988
Europe	June 1988
Europe (Reissue)	February 1989

== Cover versions ==
- Lea Salonga for her second studio album, Lea (1988).
- Nina
- Aiza Seguerra
- Charice from her Chapter 10 album.
- Sharon Cuneta, Taglish version from the Buy One Take One soundtrack album
- El Poder Del Norte
