= Rhythm Is Gonna Get You =

1987 single by Gloria Estefan and Miami Sound Machine

Single by Gloria Estefan and Miami Sound Machine

from the album Let It Loose
- B-side: "Give It Up"
- Released: May 30, 1987
- Recorded: 1987
- Studio: Criteria Studios, Miami
- Genre: Dance-pop; post-disco; freestyle
- Length: 3:56
- Label: Epic
- Songwriters: Enrique Garcia; Gloria Estefan

Gloria Estefan and Miami Sound Machine singles chronology
"Falling in Love (Uh-Oh)" (1986)	"Rhythm Is Gonna Get You" (1987)	"Betcha Say That" (1987)

Professional ratings
Review scores
Source	Rating
Number One	2/5 stars

"Rhythm Is Gonna Get You" is a song written by Enrique "Kiki" Garcia and Gloria Estefan, and released by Gloria Estefan and Miami Sound Machine in 1987 as the lead single from their tenth studio album, Let It Loose (1987) (reissued internationally as Anything for You). The song was their fourth top 10 (and second top five) single on the US Billboard Hot 100, peaking at number five.

In the UK, it took a year and a half for the single to become a chart hit. First released in May 1987 as the first single from Let It Loose, the song failed to chart; a reissue came in February 1988 after the song was featured in the film Stakeout, which reached number 107. However, after the success of the follow-up singles "Anything for You" and "1-2-3", the song was re-released in December 1988 just before Christmas and became a UK top 20 hit, peaking at number 16 in January 1989. From 1990-1991, the song was also featured in promos for Wheel of Fortune, with lyrics changed to "The Wheel is Gonna Get You".

An extended remix was released on a 12" single in the US.

It was sampled in a 1989 Bollywood film, Tridev, in the song "Oye Oye-Tirchi Topiwale" (which was further used thrice in films Double Dhamaal, Azhar and Dhurandhar: The Revenge) and "Gajar Ne Kiya Ishara". It was later sampled by Estefan's own 1998 single "Oye".

In 2018, it was selected for preservation in the National Recording Registry by the Library of Congress as being "culturally, historically, or aesthetically significant".

== Critical reception ==
Tim Simenon for Number One wrote, "This sounds a lot like 'Just Be Good to Me' by the SOS Band. The rhythm doesn't get me at all on here I'm afraid. It sounds like very dated 70's disco."

== Charts ==
=== Weekly charts ===
Chart (1987–1989)	Peak position
Belgium (Ultratop 50 Flanders)	18
Canada Top Singles (RPM)	11
Europe (European Hot 100 Singles)	54
Ireland (IRMA)	23
Italy Airplay (Music & Media)	14
Netherlands (Single Top 100)	39
New Zealand (Recorded Music NZ)	15
UK Singles (Official Charts)	16
US Billboard Hot 100	5
US Adult Contemporary (Billboard)	31

=== Year-end charts ===
Chart (1987)	Peak position
Canada Top Singles (RPM)	85
US Top Pop Singles (Billboard)	72

== Official versions and remixes ==
Original versions

1. Album version (aka 7" version / radio version / single version) — (3:54)

Pablo Flores remixes

1. 12" version (aka extended version / O-eh O-eh edit) — (7:09)
2. Dub mix — (5:58)

2006 remixes

1. Radio mix — (3:34)
2. Extended mix — (6:16)
3. Instrumental dub — (3:34)

2020 version

1. Album version (available on Brazil305) — (3:45)

== Release dates ==
Region	Date
Japan	May 2, 1987
Worldwide	May 30, 1987
Australia	December 1988
United Kingdom (re-issue)	February 1988
United States (release)	December 12, 1987
