= Conga (song) =

1985 single by Miami Sound Machine

Single by Miami Sound Machine

from the album Primitive Love
- B-side: "Mucho Money"
- Released: September 9, 1985
- Genre: Latin pop; dance-pop
- Length: 4:14
- Label: Epic
- Songwriter: Enrique E. Garcia
- Producers: Rafael Vigil; Emilio Estefan Jr.

Miami Sound Machine singles chronology
"I Need a Man" (1984)	"Conga" (1985)	"Bad Boy" (1986)

Audio sample
- file; help

Music video
- "Gloria Estefan, Miami Sound Machine - Conga" on YouTube

"Conga" is a song by American band Miami Sound Machine, led by Gloria Estefan, released as the first single from their second English-language album, Primitive Love (1985). The song was written by the band's drummer Enrique Garcia. The song first appeared on August 31, 1985, as part of the album. The single was released in Australia on September 9, 1985.

"Conga" became a worldwide success and is recognized as the Miami Sound Machine and Gloria Estefan's signature song. The single reached the top 10 in various countries, including the United States, where it was the band's first charting single on the Billboard Hot 100, and the Netherlands.

== Background ==
According to Gloria Estefan in an interview in the Netherlands television show RTL Late Night, Conga was written after the band had performed "Dr. Beat" in a club called Cartouche in Utrecht, the Netherlands. "Conga" is written in the key of E minor.

In 2001, "Conga" was re-recorded as a new remix titled "Y-Tu-Conga". It includes additional lyrics taken from "Dr. Beat" and "Rhythm Is Gonna Get You". It was released on Estefan's fourth compilation album and released as a promo single in Spain.

A version of "Conga" arranged with Brazilian rhythms and instrumentation and renamed "Samba" is included in Estefan's 2020 album Brazil305. A remix of "Conga" featuring Leslie Grace and Meek Mill was released in 2021 as a Bacardi sponsored and Boi-1da produced single.

== Commercial performance ==
The single was released in 1985 and became a worldwide hit, reaching number 10 on the U.S. Billboard Hot 100 and winning the Grand Prize at the 15th annual "Tokyo Music Festival" in Japan. The single was certified Gold by the RIAA in the U.S. for shipments of 500,000 copies. However, it wasn't a hit in the United Kingdom, failing to chart on the top 75, though it was Silver by the BPI on February 7, 2025. Furthermore, early airplay at radio stations WPLJ and Z100 in New York and hometown Top 40 radio station Y-100 helped spark interest in the song in early 1986. The television show Miami Vice and its subsequent success on NBC in the U.S. also helped spark interest in the song.

In Billboard magazine's year-end chart in 1986, "Conga" finished at number 40.

== Music video ==
The video is set in the fictional Miami night club "Copacabana", hosting a reception for an unspecified ambassador. The classical pianist serenading the crowd proves to be a complete bore, and the MC hastily asks Gloria and the Miami Sound Machine to perform "Conga" in a last-ditch attempt to salvage the reception. Even though Gloria protests that this is not an appropriate setting for the sexually charged song, she performs it anyway. Despite the initial shock of his wife, "Conga" becomes a hit with the ambassador and the club as the other attendees break out into a frenzied dance. Clips of the original video feature in the video of Estefan's 2020 reworking of the song, "Samba".

== Formats and track listings ==
U.S. and Canada 7-inch single (Epic: 34 05457) [August 1985]
No.	Title	Writer(s)	Length
1.	"Conga"	Enrique E. Garcia	4:14
2.	"Mucho Money"	Lawrence Dermer; Joe Galdo; Rafael Vigil	4:44

U.S. 12-inch single (Epic: 49 05253) [August 1985]
No.	Title	Writer(s)	Length
1.	"Conga" (dance mix)	Enrique E. Garcia	6:00
2.	"Conga" (instrumental version)	Enrique E. Garcia	4:52

U.S. 3" CD single (Epic: 34K 05457) [Reissue] {1988}
No.	Title	Writer(s)	Length
1.	"Conga"	Enrique E. Garcia	4:14
2.	"Mucho Money"	Lawrence Dermer; Joe Galdo; Rafael Vigil	4:44

U.S. promo 7-inch single (Epic: 34 05457) [August 1985]
No.	Title	Writer(s)	Length
1.	"Conga"	Enrique E. Garcia	4:14
2.	"Conga"	Enrique E. Garcia	4:14

U.S. promo 7-inch single (Discos CBS International: DBS 10074) [August 1985]
No.	Title	Writer(s)	Length
1.	"Conga"	Enrique E. Garcia	4:14
2.	"Conga"	Enrique E. Garcia	4:14

Canada 12-inch single (Epic: 12EXP-05253) [August 1985]
No.	Title	Writer(s)	Length
1.	"Conga" (dance mix)	Enrique E. Garcia	6:00
2.	"Conga" (instrumental version)	Enrique E. Garcia	4:52

Europe 7-inch single No. 1 (Epic: EPCA 6361) [1985]
No.	Title	Writer(s)	Length
1.	"Conga"	Enrique E. Garcia	4:14
2.	"Mucho Money"	Lawrence Dermer; Joe Galdo; Rafael Vigil	4:44

Europe 7-inch single No. 2 (MSM Group Photo Pic Sleeve) [Epic: EPCA 6361] {1985}
No.	Title	Writer(s)	Length
1.	"Conga"	Enrique E. Garcia	4:14
2.	"Mucho Money"	Lawrence Dermer; Joe Galdo; Rafael Vigil	4:44

Europe 7-inch single No. 3 (Limited Edition Posterbag) [MSM Group Photo Pic Sleeve] {Epic: EPCA 6361} (1985)
No.	Title	Writer(s)	Length
1.	"Conga"	Enrique E. Garcia	4:14
2.	"Mucho Money"	Lawrence Dermer; Joe Galdo; Rafael Vigil	4:44

Europe 12-inch single No. 1 (Epic: EPCA 12.6361) [1985]
No.	Title	Writer(s)	Length
1.	"Conga" (dance mix)	Enrique E. Garcia	6:00
2.	"Conga" (instrumental version)	Enrique E. Garcia	4:52

Europe 12-inch single No. 2 (MSM Group Photo Pic Sleeve) [Epic: EPCA 12.6361] {1985}
No.	Title	Writer(s)	Length
1.	"Conga" (dance mix)	Enrique E. Garcia	6:00
2.	"Conga" (instrumental version)	Enrique E. Garcia	4:52

Europe 7-inch single (European remix) [Epic: EPC 650060 7] {1986}
No.	Title	Writer(s)	Length
1.	"Conga" (European remix)	Enrique E. Garcia	4:25
2.	"Mucho Money"	Lawrence Dermer; Joe Galdo; Rafael Vigil	4:44

Europe 12-inch single (European remix) [Epic: EPC 650060 6] {1986}
No.	Title	Writer(s)	Length
1.	"Conga" (European remix)	Enrique E. Garcia	4:25
2.	"Conga" (instrumental version)	Enrique E. Garcia	4:52
3.	"Mucho Money"	Lawrence Dermer; Joe Galdo; Rafael Vigil	4:44

Germany 3" CD single (European remix) [Epic: EPC 654866 3] {Reissue} (1989)
No.	Title	Writer(s)	Length
1.	"Conga" (European remix)	Enrique E. Garcia	4:25
2.	"Conga" (dance mix)	Enrique E. Garcia	6:00

Germany 12-inch vinyl single (European remix) [EPC 654866 6] {Reissue} (1989)
No.	Title	Writer(s)	Length
1.	"Conga" (European remix)	Enrique E. Garcia	4:25
2.	"Conga" (dance mix)	Enrique E. Garcia	6:00

== Charts ==
=== Weekly charts ===
Chart (1985–1986)	Peak position
Australia (Kent Music Report)	37
Belgium (Ultratop 50 Flanders)	5
Canada Retail Singles (The Record)	1
Canada Top Singles (RPM)	1
Chile (UPI)	4
Colombia (UPI)	6
Ecuador (UPI)	1
Guatemala (UPI)	4
Netherlands (Single Top 100)	2
New Zealand (Recorded Music NZ)	2
Panama (UPI)	1
Puerto Rico (UPI)	1
South Africa (Springbok)	5
Sweden (Sverigetopplistan)	18
Switzerland (Schweizer Hitparade)	16
Spain (AFYVE)	1
UK Singles (Official Charts)	79
US Billboard Hot 100	10
US Dance Club Songs (Billboard)	7
US Dance Singles Sales (Billboard)	1
US Hot R&B/Hip-Hop Songs (Billboard)	60
US Cash Box Top 100	17

Chart (2016)	Peak position
Poland Airplay (ZPAV)	63

=== Year-end charts ===
Chart (1986)	Position
New Zealand (RIANZ)	15
US Billboard Hot 100	40

== Certifications ==
Region	Certification	Certified units/sales
Canada (Music Canada)	Gold	50,000^{^}
New Zealand (RMNZ)	Gold	15,000^{‡}
United Kingdom (BPI)	Silver	200,000^{‡}
United States (RIAA) Digital	21× Platinum (Latin)	1,260,000^{‡}
United States (RIAA) Physical	Gold	500,000^{^}
^{^} Shipments figures based on certification alone.^{‡} Sales+streaming figures based on certification alone.

== Release history ==
Region	Date
Australia	September 9, 1985
United States	October 31, 1985
United Kingdom	December 6, 1985

== See also ==
- Conga Line
- List of best-selling Latin singles
