= Greatest Hits (Gloria Estefan album) =

- Standard cover. European and certain other international editions depict a tilted full-body picture of Estefan against a dark background.

Greatest hits album by Gloria Estefan
- Released: October 30, 1992
- Genres: Pop; dance; Latin pop
- Length: 58:28 (North American edition); 69:36 (International edition)
- Label: Epic
- Producers: Emilio Estefan Jr.; Jorge Casas; Clay Ostwald

Gloria Estefan chronology
Into the Light (1991)	Greatest Hits (1992)	Mi Tierra (1993)

Singles from Greatest Hits
- 1. "Always Tomorrow" Released: October 12, 1992; 2. "I See Your Smile" Released: February 8, 1993; 3. "Go Away" Released: March 1993

Professional ratings
Review scores
Source	Rating
AllMusic	4/5 stars
Robert Christgau	(choice cut)
Entertainment Weekly	B

Greatest Hits is a compilation album by Cuban-American singer-songwriter Gloria Estefan, released on October 30, 1992, by Epic Records. The North American release of the album contains ten of her hit singles recorded throughout the 1980s and early 1990s, as well as four brand new tracks. It contains material recorded with Estefan's band Miami Sound Machine in addition to her releases as a solo artist.

== Composition ==
Although credited solely to Estefan on the front cover, the album serves as a collection of her greatest hits both as a solo artist and as lead singer of Miami Sound Machine, which later became her backing group. The album also contains four previously unreleased songs. The track listing for the US and Canadian album release differs from alternate releases in various regions. Many international releases of the album include the songs "Dr. Beat" and "Bad Boy", though the Australian and New Zealand release replaced "Bad Boy" with "Cuts Both Ways". A limited edition Australian double CD set was later released featuring a special "Megamix", a medley of Estefan's early dance hits. In 2013, the album was re-released in Brazil under the name Seleção Essencial with a new cover, though the track listing remained the same.

== Singles ==
The first single released from the album was "Always Tomorrow". It reached No. 81 on the US Billboard Hot 100 but reached No. 5 on the Adult Contemporary Chart and the top 30 in the UK Singles Chart. The second single, "I See Your Smile" charted higher and reached No. 48 on the Billboard Hot 100 Chart and No. 3 on the Billboard Adult Contemporary Chart. It also reached No. 49 in the UK. "Go Away" failed to chart on the Billboard Hot 100 Chart but reached No. 15 on the Billboard Dance Chart and was a UK top 20 hit (No. 13).

The "Megamix" or "Miami Hit Mix" as a double A-side with "Christmas Through Your Eyes" was released internationally and reached No. 8 in Colombia and the UK. Music videos were made for all these singles.

== Track listing ==
All tracks are produced by Emilio Estefan Jr., Jorge Casas, and Clay Ostwald, except where noted.

International track listing
No.	Title	Writer(s)	Producer (s)	Length
1.	"Dr. Beat" (from Eyes of Innocence, 1984)	Enrique E. García	E. Estefan	4:23
2.	"Conga" (from Primitive Love, 1985)	García	E. Estefan	4:15
3.	"Words Get in the Way" (from Primitive Love)	Gloria Estefan	E. Estefan	3:28
4.	"Can't Stay Away from You" (from Let It Loose, 1987)	G. Estefan	Emilio & The Jerks	3:56
5.	"Bad Boy" (remix) (from Primitive Love)	Lawrence Dermer; Joe Galdo; Rafael Vigil	Emilio & The Jerks	3:45
6.	"1-2-3" (remix) (from Let It Loose)	G. Estefan; García	E. Estefan	3:34
7.	"Anything for You" (from Let It Loose)	G. Estefan	E. Estefan	4:02
8.	"Here We Are" (from Cuts Both Ways, 1989)	G. Estefan		4:49
9.	"Rhythm Is Gonna Get You" (from Let It Loose)	G. Estefan; García	Emilio & The Jerks	3:56
10.	"Get on Your Feet" (from Cuts Both Ways)	John DeFaria; Casas; Ostwald		3:38
11.	"Don't Wanna Lose You" (from Cuts Both Ways)	G. Estefan		4:09
12.	"Coming Out of the Dark" (from Into the Light, 1991)	G. Estefan; E. Estefan; Jon Secada		4:03
13.	"Christmas Through Your Eyes" (previously unreleased)	G. Estefan; Diane Warren		4:52
14.	"I See Your Smile" (previously unreleased)	Secada; Miguel Morejon		4:38
15.	"Go Away" (previously unreleased)	Dermer; G. Estefan		4:17
16.	"Always Tomorrow" (previously unreleased)	G. Estefan		4:51
Total length:				69:36

=== Notes ===
- "Dr. Beat" and "Bad Boy" were excluded from US, Canadian and certain Latin American editions.
- The Australasian edition replaced "Bad Boy" with "Cuts Both Ways".
- The limited Australian edition included "Megamix" on a separate CD/cassette.

== Personnel ==
Design

- Nancy Donald – art direction
- Daphna Shalev – logo design
- Alberto Tolot – front cover photography (at the Biltmore Hotel, Coral Gables)
- Antoine Verglas – inside booklet photography (at the Raleigh Hotel, Miami Beach)
- Roberto Trovati – stylist
- Serena Radaelli – hair
- Paco – hair (for Gessner & Camp)
- Francesca Tolot – makeup
- Eric Barnard – makeup

== Charts ==
=== Weekly charts ===
Chart (1992–1993)	Peak position
Australian Albums (ARIA)	21
Austrian Albums (Ö3 Austria)	39
Canada Top Albums/CDs (RPM)	53
Dutch Albums (Album Top 100)	10
European Albums (Music & Media)	10
German Albums (Offizielle Top 100)	28
New Zealand Albums (RMNZ)	9
Swiss Albums (Schweizer Hitparade)	24
UK Albums (Official Charts)	2
US Billboard 200	15
US Top Catalog Albums (Billboard)	8

=== Year-end charts ===
1993 year-end chart performance for Greatest Hits
Chart (1993)	Position
Dutch Albums (Album Top 100)	14
UK Albums (OCC)	74
US Billboard 200	42

== Certifications and sales ==
Certifications and sales for Greatest Hits
Region	Certification	Certified units/sales
Canada (Music Canada)	Gold	50,000^{^}
France	—	300,000
Japan (RIAJ)	Gold	100,000^{^}
Netherlands (NVPI)	Platinum	100,000^{^}
New Zealand (RMNZ)	Platinum	15,000^{^}
United Kingdom (BPI)	3× Platinum	900,000^{^}
United States (RIAA)	4× Platinum	4,000,000^{^}
^{^} Shipments figures based on certification alone.
