= I See Your Smile =

- Worldwide single cover art

Single by Gloria Estefan

from the album Greatest Hits
- Released: February 8, 1993
- Recorded: September 1992
- Genre: Pop
- Length: 4:36
- Label: Epic
- Songwriters: Jon Secada; Miguel A. Morejon
- Producers: Emilio Estefan, Jr.; Jorge Casas; Clay Ostwald

Gloria Estefan singles chronology
"Miami Hit Mix / Megamix / Christmas Through Your Eyes" (1992)	"I See Your Smile" (1993)	"Go Away" (1993)

Music video
- "I See Your Smile" on YouTube

"I See Your Smile" is a single by Cuban American singer and songwriter Gloria Estefan. It was released on February 8, 1993 by Epic Records in Europe, the UK and the US as the third single worldwide, and second in America, from her first compilation album, Greatest Hits (1992). The song was written by Jon Secada and Miguel A. Morejon and produced by Emilio Estefan, Jr., Jorge Casas and Clay Ostwald. It is a Latin-pop ballad about someone who cannot get over their lost love. In the US, the song was released instead of the "Miami Hit Mix / Megamix" medley, which was the second single released in most of the world outside America. The song performed well on the US Billboard Hot Adult Contemporary Tracks chart, peaking at number three.

== Critical reception ==
AllMusic editor Jason Birchmeier described "I See Your Smile" as a "beautiful" song. Maryann Scheufele from AXS wrote, "A love song favorite like a great car is remembered. From this 1992 song comes the idea that love and taking chances combine to bring success. Gloria closes her eyes to see the smile of the one she loves and sings about that light in her life. When Gloria sings "I love you" you know she had the support of love when she took a chance." Larry Flick from Billboard magazine stated that "her recognizable alto adds color to a soft and romantic tune, co-penned by protégé Jon Secada. Far more top-40-friendly than the previous 'Always Tomorrow'."

Randy Clark from Cash Box said that "this light, tenderized love ballad should garner decent Adult Contemporary rotation even without the big ballad payoff associated with other slower Estefan hits". Dave Sholin from the Gavin Report commented, "Much more than just an instantly identifiable voice, Gloria's delivery cuts to the soul and meaning of the lyric, in this case written by Jon Secada and his pal Miguel Morejon. Sweetness and sincerity expressed in song." Alan Jones from Music Week rated it three out of five, writing that the song is "immaculately done, but almost wholly lacking in spark".

== Music video ==
A music video was produced to promote the single, featuring American actor Andy García as a waiter at a restaurant. The video was later made available on Estefan's official YouTube channel in 2010 and had generated almost three million views as of early 2024.

== Official versions ==
Original versions

1. Album Version – 4:36
2. Video Version – 4:13
3. Single Version – 4:34
4. iTunes Originals Version 2007 – 3:42

== Track listings ==
US & Canada Cassette Single (34T 74847) [February 1993]
No.	Title	Writer(s)	Length
1.	"I See Your Smile" (Single Version)	Jon Secada, Miguel A. Morejon	4:34
2.	"Megamix" (Dr. Beat, Conga, Rhythm Is Gonna Get You, 1-2-3, Get On Your Feet)	Enrique Garcia, Gloria Estefan, John DeFaria, Jorge Casas, Clay Ostwald	5:21

US & Canada 7" Vinyl Single (34 74847) [February 1993]
No.	Title	Writer(s)	Length
1.	"I See Your Smile" (Single Version)	Jon Secada, Miguel A. Morejon	4:34
2.	"Megamix" (Dr. Beat, Conga, Rhythm Is Gonna Get You, 1-2-3, Get On Your Feet)	Enrique Garcia, Gloria Estefan, John DeFaria, Jorge Casas, Clay Ostwald	5:21

US Promo CD Single (ESK 74847) [February 1993]
No.	Title	Writer(s)	Length
1.	"I See Your Smile" (Single Version)	Jon Secada, Miguel A. Morejon	4:34
2.	"Megamix" (Dr. Beat, Conga, Rhythm Is Gonna Get You, 1-2-3, Get On Your Feet)	Enrique Garcia, Gloria Estefan, John DeFaria, Jorge Casas, Clay Ostwald	5:21

Europe CD Single (EPC 658945 1) [February 1993]
No.	Title	Writer(s)	Length
1.	"I See Your Smile" (Video Version)	Jon Secada, Miguel A. Morejon	4:33
2.	"Si Voy A Perderte" (Don't Wanna Lose You – Spanish Version)	Gloria Estefan	4:06

Europe CD Maxi-Single (EPC 658945 2) [February 1993]
No.	Title	Writer(s)	Length
1.	"I See Your Smile" (Video Version)	Jon Secada, Miguel A. Morejon	4:33
2.	"Si Voy A Perderte" (Don't Wanna Lose You – Spanish Version)	Gloria Estefan	4:06
3.	"Nayib's Song (I Am Here For You)"	Gloria Estefan	4:39

Europe 7" Vinyl Single (EPC 658945 7) [February 1993]
No.	Title	Writer(s)	Length
1.	"I See Your Smile" (Video Version)	Jon Secada, Miguel A. Morejon	4:33
2.	"Si Voy A Perderte" (Don't Wanna Lose You – Spanish Version)	Gloria Estefan	4:06

Spain Promo 7" Vinyl Single (ARIE 3168) [February 1993]
No.	Title	Writer(s)	Length
1.	"I See Your Smile"	Jon Secada, Miguel A. Morejon	4:58

UK CD Maxi-Single (658961 2) [February 1993]
No.	Title	Writer(s)	Length
1.	"I See Your Smile" (Video Version)	Jon Secada, Miguel A. Morejon	4:33
2.	"Nayib's Song (I Am Here For You)"	Gloria Estefan	4:39
3.	"Si Voy A Perderte" (Don't Wanna Lose You – Spanish Version)	Gloria Estefan	4:06

UK Cassette Single (658961 4) [February 1993]
No.	Title	Writer(s)	Length
1.	"I See Your Smile" (Video Version)	Jon Secada, Miguel A. Morejon	4:33
2.	"Si Voy A Perderte" (Don't Wanna Lose You – Spanish Version)	Gloria Estefan	4:06

UK 7" Vinyl Single (658961 7) [February 1993]
No.	Title	Writer(s)	Length
1.	"I See Your Smile" (Video Version)	Jon Secada, Miguel A. Morejon	4:33
2.	"Si Voy A Perderte" (Don't Wanna Lose You – Spanish Version)	Gloria Estefan	4:06

== Charts ==
=== Weekly charts ===
Chart (1993)	Peak position
Panama (UPI)	6
UK Singles (Official Charts)	49
US Billboard Hot 100	48
US Adult Contemporary (Billboard)	3
US Cash Box Top 100	34

=== Year-end charts ===
Chart (1993)	Position
US Adult Contemporary (Billboard)	4

== Release history ==
Region	Date
United States	February 1993
Europe	February 1993
United Kingdom	February 13, 1993
