= Éxitos de Gloria Estefan =

Greatest hits album by Gloria Estefan
- Released: October 1, 1990
- Recorded: 1975–1990
- Genre: Latin pop
- Label: Epic; CBS Discos
- Producer: Emilio Estefan Jr.; Jorge Casas; Clay Ostwald; Pepe Luis Soto

Gloria Estefan chronology
Cuts Both Ways (1989)	Éxitos de Gloria Estefan (1990)	Into the Light (1991)

Singles from Éxitos de Gloria Estefan
- 1. "Renacer" Released: October 1990

Professional ratings
Review scores
Source	Rating
Allmusic	4/5 stars
The Rolling Stone Album Guide	3/5 stars

Éxitos de Gloria Estefan is the first compilation album released by American recording artist Gloria Estefan, but is the second solo release and the 13th overall, released in 1990 (see 1990 in music). In 1999, the CD was re-released in the US as 20th Anniversary.

== Content ==
In 1990, following the release of her debut solo album Cuts Both Ways, Estefan released her first compilation album Éxitos de Gloria Estefan. The album consists of previous Spanish hits recorded with Miami Sound Machine. "Conga" and "Dr. Beat" are the only English songs on the album. The compilation also includes "Toda pra você", the Portuguese version of the song "Here We Are."

== Track listing ==
- Some LP Releases did include the Bonus Track

Worldwide LP, CD, Cassette & MiniDisc Release
No.	Title	Writer(s)	Length
1.	"Renacer" (1990 Solo Version)	Oliva, Giordano, Serrano, Murciano	3:21
2.	"Conga"	Enrique Garcia	4:15
3.	"No Será Fácil"	Gloria Estefan	4:37
4.	"Dr. Beat"	Enrique Garcia	4:21
5.	"Regresa A Mí"	Enrique Garcia	4:36
6.	"No Te Olvidaré" (Anything for You - Spanish Version)	Gloria Estefan	4:01
7.	"Dingui-Li-Bangui"	Gloria Estefan, J. D. San, MacDonys	3:57
8.	"No Me Vuelvo A Enamorar" (Words Get In The Way - Spanish Version)	Gloria Estefan	3:30
9.	"Si Voy A Perderte" (Don't Wanna Lose You - Spanish Version)	Gloria Estefan	4:06
10.	"Oye Mi Canto" (Spanish Version)	Gloria Estefan, Jorge Casas, Clay Ostwald	4:55

Worldwide CD, Cassette & MiniDisc Bonus Track
No.	Title	Writer(s)	Length
11.	"Toda Prá Você (Bonus Track)" (Here We Are - Portuguese Version)	Gloria Estefan, Aloysio Reis	4:48

== Chart positions ==
The compilation reached No. 1 on the Top Latin Pop Albums chart in 1990. It later reached No. 32 on the comprehensive Top Latin Albums chart introduced three years after its release.

Chart (1990)	Peak position
Australian Albums (ARIA)	116
Dutch Albums Chart	54
US Latin Pop Albums (Billboard)	1

Chart (1993)	Peak position
US Top Latin Albums (Billboard)	32

== Certification ==
Region	Certification	Certified units/sales
Argentina (CAPIF)	Gold	30,000^{^}
^{^} Shipments figures based on certification alone.

== Release history ==
Country	Release date
Europe	October 1, 1990
US/Latin America	October 1990
Japan	December 21, 1990

== See also ==
- List of number-one Billboard Latin Pop Albums from the 1990s
