= Megamix (Gloria Estefan song) =

"Miami Hit Mix / Megamix"

Single by Gloria Estefan
- Released: November 3, 1992
- Recorded: 1992
- Genre: Dance
- Length: 5:20
- Label: Epic
- Songwriters: Pablo Flores; Javier Garza

Gloria Estefan singles chronology
"Always Tomorrow" (1992)	"Miami Hit Mix / Megamix" (1992)	"I See Your Smile" (1993)

Music video
- "Megamix" on YouTube

Megamix

"Megamix" (also known as "Miami Hit Mix") is a song by Cuban American singer and songwriter Gloria Estefan. It was released by Epic Records in late 1992 in Europe, the UK and Colombia under the title "Miami Hit Mix", and under the title "Megamix" in Australia, Mexico and the B-Side of "Christmas Through Your Eyes", a holiday song, in the Netherlands. It was released as a standalone single in these territories to promote Estefan's 1992 greatest hits album, only appearing on a limited Australian edition of this album. The song was released as a B-Side on Gloria's 1993 "I See Your Smile" in the US and on the 1993 US Maxi Single "Go Away". It peaked at number eight in the UK.

== Music video ==
The "Megamix", as it was called internationally, also known as the "Miami Hitmix" in the UK, was a medley of the greatest hits by the Miami Sound Machine and Gloria Estefan. In order of appearance in the "Megamix", the medley includes the following songs:

- "Dr. Beat"
- "Conga"
- "Rhythm Is Gonna Get You"
- "1-2-3"
- "Get on Your Feet"

The remix was produced by Estefan's remix creators, Pablo Flores and Javier Garza. The video of the song is included on her Everlasting Gloria! video collection and the music video features clips from Estefan's previous videos from 1984 to 1992, as well as scenes of Estefan on her touring, as well as live performances.

== Charts ==
Chart (1992–1993)	Peak position
Australia (ARIA)	119
Colombia (Colombian Singles Chart)	7
Europe (European Hot 100 Singles)	30
Germany (Official German Charts)	92
Ireland (IRMA)	12
Netherlands (Dutch Top 40 Tipparade)	7
Netherlands (Single Top 100)	50
UK Singles (OCC)	8
UK Airplay (Music Week)	32
UK Dance (Music Week)	17

== Track listings and formats ==
=== "Miami Hit Mix" ===
UK/Europe CD Maxi-Single (658837 2) [November 1992]
No.	Title	Writer(s)	Length
1.	"Miami Hit Mix" (Dr. Beat, Conga, Rhythm Is Gonna Get You, 1-2-3, Get On Your Feet)	Enrique Garcia, Gloria Estefan, John DeFaria, Jorge Casas, Clay Ostwald	5:17
2.	"Christmas Through Your Eyes"	Gloria Estefan, Diane Warren	4:51
3.	"Cuts Both Ways"	Gloria Estefan	3:13

UK 7" Vinyl Single (658837 7) / UK Cassette Single (658837 4) [November 1992]
No.	Title	Writer(s)	Length
1.	"Miami Hit Mix" (Dr. Beat, Conga, Rhythm Is Gonna Get You, 1-2-3, Get On Your Feet)	Enrique Garcia, Gloria Estefan, John DeFaria, Jorge Casas, Clay Ostwald	5:17
2.	"Christmas Through Your Eyes"	Gloria Estefan, Diane Warren	4:51

UK 12" Vinyl Single (658837 6) [Includes Free Poster] / Colombia 12" Vinyl Single (92 654079) [November 1992]
No.	Title	Writer(s)	Length
1.	"Miami Hit Mix" (Dr. Beat, Conga, Rhythm Is Gonna Get You, 1-2-3, Get On Your Feet)	Enrique Garcia, Gloria Estefan, John DeFaria, Jorge Casas, Clay Ostwald	5:17
2.	"Live For Loving You" (Underground Club Mix)	Gloria Estefan, Emilio Estefan, Jr., Diane Warren	7:21
3.	"Christmas Through Your Eyes"	Gloria Estefan, Diane Warren	4:51

UK Promo CD Single (XPCD 237) [November 1992]
No.	Title	Writer(s)	Length
1.	"Miami Hit Mix (Without Rap)" (Dr. Beat, Conga, Rhythm Is Gonna Get You, 1-2-3, Get On Your Feet)	Enrique Garcia, Gloria Estefan, John DeFaria, Jorge Casas, Clay Ostwald	4:46
2.	"Miami Hit Mix (With Rap)" (Dr. Beat, Conga, Rhythm Is Gonna Get You, 1-2-3, Get On Your Feet)	Enrique Garcia, Gloria Estefan, John DeFaria, Jorge Casas, Clay Ostwald	5:17
3.	"Cuts Both Ways"	Gloria Estefan	3:13

Mexico CD Single (34K 470728) [1993]
No.	Title	Writer(s)	Length
1.	"Miami Hit Mix" (Dr. Beat, Conga, Rhythm Is Gonna Get You, 1-2-3, Get On Your Feet)	Enrique Garcia, Gloria Estefan, John DeFaria, Jorge Casas, Clay Ostwald	5:17
2.	"Miami Hit Mix" (Dr. Beat, Conga, Rhythm Is Gonna Get You, 1-2-3, Get On Your Feet)	Enrique Garcia, Gloria Estefan, John DeFaria, Jorge Casas, Clay Ostwald	5:17

=== "Megamix" ===
Spain Promo 7" Vinyl Single (ARIE 3153) [November 1992]
No.	Title	Writer(s)	Length
1.	"Megamix" (Dr. Beat, Conga, Rhythm Is Gonna Get You, 1-2-3, Get On Your Feet)	Enrique Garcia, Gloria Estefan, John DeFaria, Jorge Casas, Clay Ostwald	5:17
2.	"Christmas Through Your Eyes"	Gloria Estefan, Diane Warren	4:51

Spain Promo 12" Vinyl Single (ARIE 3163)
No.	Title	Writer(s)	Length
1.	"Megamix" (Dr. Beat, Conga, Rhythm Is Gonna Get You, 1-2-3, Get On Your Feet)	Enrique Garcia, Gloria Estefan, John DeFaria, Jorge Casas, Clay Ostwald	5:17
2.	"Always Tomorrow"	Gloria Estefan	4:51

Australia CD Single (659124 1) / Australia Cassette Single (659124 4)
No.	Title	Writer(s)	Length
1.	"Megamix" (Dr. Beat, Conga, Rhythm Is Gonna Get You, 1-2-3, Get On Your Feet)	Enrique Garcia, Gloria Estefan, John DeFaria, Jorge Casas, Clay Ostwald	5:21
2.	"I See Your Smile"	Jon Secada, Miguel A. Morejon	4:58

=== "Christmas Through Your Eyes" ===
US Promo CD Single (ESK 74768) / UK Promo CD Single (XPCD 238) [November 1992]
No.	Title	Writer(s)	Length
1.	"Christmas Through Your Eyes"	Gloria Estefan, Diane Warren	4:51

Europe CD Maxi-Single (EPC 658871 2) [November 1992]
No.	Title	Writer(s)	Length
1.	"Christmas Through Your Eyes"	Gloria Estefan, Diane Warren	4:51
2.	"Megamix" (Dr. Beat, Conga, Rhythm Is Gonna Get You, 1-2-3, Get On Your Feet)	Enrique Garcia, Gloria Estefan, John DeFaria, Jorge Casas, Clay Ostwald	5:17
3.	"Cuts Both Ways"	Gloria Estefan	3:13

Europe Cassette Single (EPC 658871 4) / Europe 7" Vinyl Single (EPC 658871 7) [November 1992]
No.	Title	Writer(s)	Length
1.	"Christmas Through Your Eyes"	Gloria Estefan, Diane Warren	4:51
2.	"Megamix" (Dr. Beat, Conga, Rhythm Is Gonna Get You, 1-2-3, Get On Your Feet)	Enrique Garcia, Gloria Estefan, John DeFaria, Jorge Casas, Clay Ostwald	5:17
