= Abriendo Puertas (song) =

Single by Gloria Estefan

from the album Abriendo Puertas
- Released: September 19, 1995
- Genre: Son cubano; vallenato
- Length: 3:52 (Album Version)
- Label: Epic
- Songwriter: Kike Santander
- Producers: Santander; Emilio Estefan

Gloria Estefan singles chronology
"Cherchez La Femme" (1994)	"Abriendo Puertas" (1995)	"Más Allá" (1995)

Music video
- "Abriendo Puertas" on YouTube

"Abriendo Puertas" (English: "Opening Doors") is a song from Cuban American singer-songwriter Gloria Estefan's sixth studio album, of the same name (1995). The song was written by Kike Santander, who handled production alongside Gloria's husband Emilio Estefan. It was released as the lead single from the album on September 19, 1995. The song is a vallenato and son cubano tune that metaphorically deals with opening doors and closing wounds. Its music video features Estefan performing the song while also showing scenes of farmers planting crops. The song received positive reactions from music critics, who mostly praised the instruments. Commercially, it topped both Billboard's Hot Latin Songs and Tropical Airplay charts in the United States and peaked at number three on the Dance Club Songs chart as well.

Gloria Estefan performed the song live as part of the opening ceremony for the 22nd Annual Latin Grammy Awards in 2021. Estefan re-recorded the song in 2020 for her fourteenth studio album Brazil305 and incorporated Brazilian music. The song received three accolades including the Lo Nuestro Award for Tropical Song of the Year and Billboard Latin Music Award for Latin Dance Single of the Year" in 1996. American singer Leslie Grace covered the song live as part the Lo Nuestro Awards tribute to Estefan by Univision in 2018.

== Background and composition ==
In 1995, Gloria released her second Spanish-language studio album, Abriendo Puertas, which was produced in its entirety by Colombian composer Kike Santander and her husband Emilio Estefan. Abriendo Puertas is a holiday album with the tracks making references to Christmas and New Year's. Santander penned all the songs on the album, including the opening title track. The song is a vallenato track with a mix of Son cubano and according to Juan Fermin Cabrera of the New York Daily News conveys "positive message of freedom, encouragement and hope". In the song, Estefan chants "Abriendo puertas, cerrando heridas" ("opening doors and closing wounds") which The Boston Globe editor Alisa Valdes noted it reflects a "growing desire among Cuban-American exiles to build bridges to the people of Cuba".

== Promotion and reception ==
"Abriendo Puertas" was released as the album's lead single on September 30, 1995, by Epic Records. A re-recording of the song was included on her fourteenth studio album Brazil305 (2020) and this version incorporates Brazilian music. The accompanying music video for the original version intersperses Estefan performing while farmers are growing their crops. Estefan performed "Abriendo Puertas" live as part of a medley along with "Cuando Hay Amor" and "Magalenha" during the opening ceremony of the 22nd Annual Latin Grammy Awards in 2021. Parry Gettelman called it a "charming title track". Achy Obejas of the Chicago Tribune highlighted "Abriendo Puertas" for its "simple words about unity and its sweet vallenato rhythms". An editor for El Tiempo felt that the blending of the two genres mixes well Mario Tarradell of the Dallas Morning News noted that while Estefan's phrasings and instruments "evoke the sound of vallenato", its arrangements "also pays tribute to the light swing and brassy Cali salsa sound".

At the 1996 Billboard Latin Music Awards, "Abriendo Puertas" won "Latin Dance Single of the Year". In the same year, the track won the Lo Nuestro Award for Tropical Song of the Year. It was also recognized as one of the best-performing songs of the year at the 1997 BMI Awards. In the United States, "Abriendo Puetas" reached the top of the Billboard Hot Latin Songs and Tropical Airplay charts while it peaked at number three on the Dance Club Songs chart and ranked number 76 in Switzerland. As honoree of the Lo Nuestro Excellence Award by Univision along with her husband, the track was performed by American singer Leslie Grace during the 2018 Lo Nuestro Awards along with "Conga".

== Formats and track listings ==
United States single

1. Abriendo Puertas (Opening Doors) (album version) – 3:52
2. Abriendo Puertas (Opening Doors) (Teri's Twirlin Vocal Mix) – 8:13
3. Abriendo Puertas (Opening Doors) (D's Classic Club Mix) – 7:29
4. Abriendo Puertas (Opening Doors) (Spanish Fly Club Mix) – 6:13
5. Cherchez La Femme (Ballroom Vocal Mix) – 7:29

Europe single

1. Abriendo Puertas (album version) – 3:52
2. Abriendo Puertas (Teri's Twirlin Vocal Mix) – 8:14
3. Abriendo Puertas (D's Classic Club Mix) – 7:32
4. Abriendo Puertas (Teri's Gettin Hard Club) – 5:13
5. Abriendo Puertas (D's Underground Dub) – 6:13

== Personnel ==
Adapted from the Abriendo Puertas liner notes:

- Edwin Bonilla – maracas, claves, kick drum
- Ed Calle – alto saxophone, baritone saxophone, tenor saxophone
- Tony Concepcion – trumpet
- Heberth Cuadrado – caja vallenata
- Luis Enrique – congas, timbales, bongos, chorus
- Gonzalo A. "Cocha" Molina – vallenato accordion
- Teddy Mulet – trumpet solo
- Cheito Quinonez – backing vocalist
- Kike Santander – bass guitar, guacharaca, backing vocalist
- Diana Serna – backing vocalist
- Dana Teboe – trombone
- René Toledo – twelve-string guitar

== Charts ==
=== Weekly charts ===
Chart performance for "Abriendo Puertas"
Chart (1995)	Peak position
Peru (UPI)	4
Puerto Rico (UPI)	1
Switzerland (Schweizer Hitparade)	76
US Dance Club Songs (Billboard)	3
US Hot Latin Songs (Billboard)	1
Venezuela (UPI)	8

=== Year-end charts ===
1995 year-end chart performance for "Abriendo Puertas"
Chart (1995)	Position
US Hot Latin Songs (Billboard)	21

== See also ==
- List of number-one Billboard Hot Latin Tracks of 1995
- List of Billboard Tropical Airplay number ones of 1994 and 1995
