= Always Tomorrow =

Single by Gloria Estefan

from the album Greatest Hits
- Released: October 12, 1992
- Recorded: 1992
- Genre: Pop
- Length: 4:51
- Label: Epic
- Songwriter: Gloria Estefan
- Producers: Emilio Estefan, Jr.; Jorge Casas; Clay Ostwald

Gloria Estefan singles chronology
"Live for Loving You" (1991)	"Always Tomorrow" (1992)	"Megamix / Miami Hit Mix / Christmas Through Your Eyes" (1992)

Music video
- "Always Tomorrow" on YouTube

"Always Tomorrow" is a song by Cuban American singer and songwriter Gloria Estefan, released worldwide on October 12, 1992 by Epic Records as the first single from her compilation album, Greatest Hits (1992). The song is written by Estefan and produced by her husband Emilio Estefan, Jr., Jorge Casas and Clay Ostwald. It is a guitar-driven acoustic ballad about starting over in the wake of tragedy or disaster. While on tour, Estefan has played the guitar while singing the song. She donated royalties from single sales to the victims of Hurricane Andrew. In 2005, the song was featured in a medley with her No. 1 smash "Coming Out of the Dark" in the compilation "Hurricane Relief: Come Together now", created for Hurricane Katrina disaster relief.

== Critical reception ==
Larry Flick from Billboard magazine described the song as an "earnest, thoughtful ballad", and noted further that Estefan's "warm and distinctive alto floats lightly over an arrangement of acoustic guitar strumming and soft, swirling strings." Randy Clark from Cash Box stated, "The message on this inspirational, richly orchestrated track should at least offer an uplifting musical glimmer of hope in the now familiar Estefan ballad fashion". Dave Sholin from the Gavin Report said it is "combining an uplifting message and melody". Another GR editor called it "hopeful and worthy five minutes of class."

== Music video ==
A music video was produced to promote the single. It is one of Estefan's simplest clips, focusing on how the victims of Hurricane Andrew rebuilt Miami. In between, Estefan performs while standing by a brick wall or plays on her guitar in front of skies. It was later made available on Estefan's official YouTube channel in 2009 and had generated more than 2.3 million views as of November 2025.

== Charts ==
=== Weekly charts ===
Chart (1992)	Peak position
Australia (ARIA)	107
Colombia (Colombian Singles Chart)	5
Europe (Eurochart Hot 100)	63
Ireland (IRMA)	27
Japan (Tokyo)	21
Netherlands (Dutch Top 40)	17
Netherlands (Single Top 100)	15
UK Singles (OCC)	24
UK Airplay (Music Week)	29
US Billboard Hot 100	81
US Adult Contemporary (Billboard)	5
US Cash Box Top 100	73

=== Year-end charts ===
Chart (1993)	Position
US Adult Contemporary (Billboard)	47

== Track listings ==
US & Canada Cassette Single (34T 74472) [October 1992]
No.	Title	Writer(s)	Length
1.	"Always Tomorrow"	Gloria Estefan	4:50
2.	"Words Get In The Way" (Live in Miami from the Homecoming Concert, 1988)	Gloria Estefan	5:02

US & Canada 7" Vinyl Single (34 74472) [October 1992]
No.	Title	Writer(s)	Length
1.	"Always Tomorrow"	Gloria Estefan	4:50
2.	"Words Get In The Way" (Live in Miami from the Homecoming Concert, 1988)	Gloria Estefan	5:02

US Promo CD Single #1 (ESK 74472) [October 1992]
No.	Title	Writer(s)	Length
1.	"Always Tomorrow"	Gloria Estefan	4:50

US Promo CD Single #2 (ESK 4902) [October 1992]
No.	Title	Writer(s)	Length
1.	"Always Tomorrow" (The New Mix)	Gloria Estefan	4:50

Europe CD Single (EPC 658397 1) [October 1992]
No.	Title	Writer(s)	Length
1.	"Always Tomorrow"	Gloria Estefan	4:50
2.	"Words Get In The Way" (Live in Miami from the Homecoming Concert, 1988)	Gloria Estefan	5:02

Europe CD Maxi-Single (EPC 658397 2) [October 1992]
No.	Title	Writer(s)	Length
1.	"Always Tomorrow"	Gloria Estefan	4:50
2.	"Words Get In The Way" (Live in Miami from the Homecoming Concert, 1988)	Gloria Estefan	5:02
3.	"The Miami Hitmix" (Dr. Beat, Conga, Rhythm Is Gonna Get You, 1-2-3, Get On Your Feet, Live For Loving You)	Gloria Estefan	9:10

Europe 7" Vinyl Single (EPC 658397 7) [October 1992]
No.	Title	Writer(s)	Length
1.	"Always Tomorrow"	Gloria Estefan	4:50
2.	"Words Get In The Way" (Live in Miami from the Homecoming Concert, 1988)	Gloria Estefan	5:02

Europe 12" Vinyl Single (EPC 658397 6) [October 1992]
No.	Title	Writer(s)	Length
1.	"Always Tomorrow"	Gloria Estefan	4:50
2.	"Words Get In The Way" (Live in Miami from the Homecoming Concert, 1988)	Gloria Estefan	5:02
3.	"The Miami Hitmix" (Dr. Beat, Conga, Rhythm Is Gonna Get You, 1-2-3, Get On Your Feet, Live For Loving You)	Gloria Estefan	9:10

Dutch Promo CD Single (PRO 713) [October 1992]
No.	Title	Writer(s)	Length
1.	"Always Tomorrow"	Gloria Estefan	4:50

Italy Promo 7" Vinyl Single (JC 15321) [October 1992]
No.	Title	Writer(s)	Length
1.	"Always Tomorrow"	Gloria Estefan	4:50

Spain Promo 7" Vinyl Single (ARIE 3125) [October 1992]
No.	Title	Writer(s)	Length
1.	"Always Tomorrow"	Gloria Estefan	4:50

UK CD-Maxi Single (EPC 658397 2) [October 1992]
No.	Title	Writer(s)	Length
1.	"Always Tomorrow"	Gloria Estefan	4:50
2.	"Words Get In The Way" (Live in Miami from the Homecoming Concert, 1988)	Gloria Estefan	5:02
3.	"The Miami Hitmix" (Dr. Beat, Conga, Rhythm Is Gonna Get You, 1-2-3, Get On Your Feet, Live For Loving You)	Gloria Estefan	9:10

UK Cassette Single (658397 4) [October 1992]
No.	Title	Writer(s)	Length
1.	"Always Tomorrow"	Gloria Estefan	4:50
2.	"Words Get In The Way" (Live in Miami from the Homecoming Concert, 1988)	Gloria Estefan	5:02

UK 7" Vinyl Single (EPC 658397 7) [October 1992]
No.	Title	Writer(s)	Length
1.	"Always Tomorrow"	Gloria Estefan	4:50
2.	"Words Get In The Way" (Live in Miami from the Homecoming Concert, 1988)	Gloria Estefan	5:02

UK 12" Vinyl Single (EPC 658397 6) [October 1992]
No.	Title	Writer(s)	Length
1.	"Always Tomorrow"	Gloria Estefan	4:50
2.	"Words Get In The Way" (Live in Miami from the Homecoming Concert, 1988)	Gloria Estefan	5:02
3.	"The Miami Hitmix" (Dr. Beat, Conga, Rhythm Is Gonna Get You, 1-2-3, Get On Your Feet, Live For Loving You)	Gloria Estefan	9:10

Mexico Promo 12" Vinyl Single (PRLP 95844) [October 1992]
No.	Title	Writer(s)	Length
1.	"Always Tomorrow"	Gloria Estefan	4:50

Costa Rica Promo 12" Vinyl Single (71017692) [October 1992]
No.	Title	Writer(s)	Length
1.	"Always Tomorrow"	Gloria Estefan	4:50

Australia CD Single (658397 1) [October 1992]
No.	Title	Writer(s)	Length
1.	"Always Tomorrow"	Gloria Estefan	4:50
2.	"Words Get In The Way" (Live in Miami from the Homecoming Concert, 1988)	Gloria Estefan	5:02

Australia Cassette Single (658397 4) [October 1992]
No.	Title	Writer(s)	Length
1.	"Always Tomorrow"	Gloria Estefan	4:50
2.	"Words Get In The Way" (Live in Miami from the Homecoming Concert, 1988)	Gloria Estefan	5:02

Philippines 7" Vinyl Single (QEL45-20259) [October 1992]
No.	Title	Writer(s)	Length
1.	"Always Tomorrow"	Gloria Estefan	4:50
2.	"No Te Olvidaré" (Anything For You - Spanish Version)	Gloria Estefan	4:04

Japan 3" CD Single (ESDA 7114) [October 13, 1992]
No.	Title	Writer(s)	Length
1.	"Always Tomorrow"	Gloria Estefan	4:50
2.	"Words Get In The Way" (Live in Miami from the Homecoming Concert, 1988)	Gloria Estefan	5:02

== Official versions ==
Original Versions

1. Album Version — 4:37
2. The New Mix — 4:31

== Release history ==
Region	Date
US	October 1992
Europe	October 1992
UK	October 1992
Japan	October 25, 1992
