= I Need a Man =

I Need a Man may refer to:

- "I Need a Man" (Eurythmics song)
- "I Need a Man" (Miami Sound Machine song)
- "I Need a Man" (Foxy Brown song)
- "I Need a Man" (Grace Jones song)
- "I Need a Man" (Manhattan Transfer song)
