= Renacer (song) =

Single by Gloria Estefan

from the album Exitos de Gloria Estefan
- Released: 1990
- Recorded: 1989
- Genre: Latin pop
- Label: CBS Records
- Songwriters: Carlos Oliva; J. Giordano; Luis Serrano; Raúl Murciano, Jr.

Gloria Estefan singles chronology
"Cuts Both Ways" (1990)	"Renacer" (1990)	"Coming Out of the Dark" (1991)

Music video
- "Renacer" on YouTube

"Renacer" (Reborn) is a song by Cuban-American singer and songwriter Gloria Estefan. It was released in 1990 worldwide as the only single of her first compilation album, Exitos de Gloria Estefan (1990). The song was first recorded by Egberto and Maria De Lourdes Garcia (siblings from Ecuador) then later Miami Sound Machine made it their first single, but did not have any success with it. An English version, "Live Again", was also recorded. Later Estefan re-recorded and eventually released the song, reaching the top ten on the Billboard Hot Latin Tracks chart. The Spanish Version of "Oye mi Canto (Hear my Voice)" was used as b-side on the single release. "Renacer" was also covered by Mexican singer Luis Miguel in 1990, but never included on his albums.

== Track listing ==
US 7" Vinyl Single (CBS Discos Label) [DBS 81285]
No.	Title	Writer(s)	Length
1.	"Renacer"	Carlos Oliva, J. Giordano "Giodano", Luis Serrano & Raúl Murciano, Jr.	3:21
2.	"Oye Mi Canto" (Spanish Version)	Gloria Estefan, Jorge Casas, Clay Ostwald	4:55

== Charts ==
Country	Peak position
US Hot Latin Songs (Billboard)	7
