= Más Allá =

1995 song by Gloria Estefan

Single by Gloria Estefan

from the album Abriendo Puertas
- Released: December 1995
- Studio: Crescent Moon, Miami, FL; Right Track Recording, New York, NY
- Genre: Bolero; flamenco
- Length: 5:22
- Label: Epic
- Songwriter: Kike Santander
- Producers: Emilio Estefan; Kike Santander

Gloria Estefan singles chronology
"Abriendo Puertas" (1995)	"Más Allá" (1995)	"Tres Deseos" (1996)

"Más Allá" (English: "Beyond") is a song from Cuban-American singer-songwriter Gloria Estefan's sixth studio album, Abriendo Puertas (1995). The song was written by Kike Santander, who handled production alongside Gloria's husband Emilio Estefan. It was released as the second single from the album in December 1995. A Christmas bolero ballad, the song utilizes church bells and lyrically deals with selfless love. The song received positive reactions from music critics, who mostly praised the instruments. Commercially, it topped both the Billboard Hot Latin Songs and Latin Pop Airplay charts in the United States. Gloria Estefan performed the song live for Pope John Paul II at the Vatican and for then-US President Bill Clinton during a televised holiday special. Estefan re-recorded the song in 2020 for her fourteenth studio album Brazil305 and incorporated Brazilian music.

== Background and composition ==
In 1995, Gloria released her second Spanish-language studio album, Abriendo Puertas, which was produced in its entirety by Kike Santander and Emilio Estefan. Abriendo Puertas is a holiday album with the tracks making references to Christmas and New Year's. Santander penned all the songs on the album, including "Más Allá", which was released as the second single in December 1995. An editor for El Tiempo described the track as a bolero ballad, noting that the lyrics speak, "of love that asks for nothing in return and forgives and fights for its ideals". Writing for the Grammy website, Jon O'Brien called the track a flamenco-ballad that utilizes church bells.

== Promotion and reception ==
Estefan performed "Más Allá" live at the Vatican for Pope John Paul II in October 1995, where she was backed by a 62-piece orchestra. She also sang the track live two months later for the White House, presented by then-President Bill Clinton for a Christmas television special for the White House. A re-recording of the song was included on her fourteenth studio album Brazil305 (2020) and incorporates Brazilian music. "Más Allá" has been covered by American Tejano musician Elsa García on the Christmas compilation album Navidad en Mi Pueblo (2002), and by Spanish singer Raphael on his holiday album Ven a Mi Casa Esta Navidad (2015).

Billboard critic Larry Flick wrote a positive review for the single, complimenting it as a "sweet acoustic ballad", and praised Estefan's vocals as "in excellent form". He also praised the instruments in the background. An editor for El Tiempo called it an "endearing ballad". J.D. Considine of The Baltimore Sun regarded the song as "one of the best ballads" Estefan has recorded. Chuck Campbell of the South Bend Tribune felt that the track is a "too-flowerysong about selfless love". A reviewer for Music & Media complimented it as a "seductively warm track", and noted the usage of "Latin percussions and a Spanish guitar" in the background. Cashbox critic Steve Baltin remarked that the song "has the feel, at times, of a slickly produced Mexican folk song" and it "makes for a lovely, and different, listening experience for pop fans." In the United States, "Más Allá" reached the top of the Billboard Hot Latin Songs and Latin Pop Airplay charts.

== Charts ==
Chart performance for "Más Allá"
Chart (1995–1996)	Peak position
US Hot Latin Songs (Billboard)	1
US Latin Pop Airplay (Billboard)	1
US Tropical Airplay (Billboard)	10

== See also ==
- List of Billboard Latin Pop Airplay number ones of 1994 and 1995
- List of Billboard Latin Pop Airplay number ones of 1996
- List of number-one Billboard Hot Latin Tracks of 1996
