= I Need a Man (Miami Sound Machine song) =

- Side label for U.S. 12-inch single

Single by Miami Sound Machine

from the album Eyes of Innocence and A Toda Maquina
- B-side: "Orange Express"
- Released: November 1984 (U.S.)
- Recorded: 1983–1984
- Genre: Pop; dance-pop
- Length: 3:40
- Label: Epic
- Songwriter(s): Enrique Garcia

Miami Sound Machine singles chronology
"Prisoner of Love" (1984)	"I Need a Man" (1984)	"Conga" (1985)

"I Need a Man" was the third single released by the American band Miami Sound Machine on their first English language album, and eighth studio album overall, Eyes of Innocence. The song was written by the band's drummer Enrique Garcia.

== Song history ==
This song was released in the United States at the same time that "Prisoner of Love" was released in Europe, which was an exclusive single for the European countries. "I Need a Man" was released as a single in the United States, making it their second single from the album stateside, but third overall.

The single was released as a follow-up to the dance club hit, "Dr. Beat"; however, it did not appear on any Billboard chart.

== Track listing ==
7" single

1. "I Need a Man" (E. E. Garcia) – 3:42
2. "Orange Express" (S. Watanabe, L.B. Wright) – 3:30

12" single

1. "I Need a Man (Special Version)" (E. E. Garcia) – 5:54
2. "I Need a Man (Instrumental)" (E. E. Garcia) – 4:25
