= Brazil305 =

Studio album by Gloria Estefan
- Released: August 13, 2020
- Genres: Latin pop; samba; dance
- Length: 73:05
- Labels: Crescent Moon; Sony Music Latin
- Producer: Emilio Estefan

Gloria Estefan chronology
The Standards (2013)	Brazil305 (2020)	Estefan Family Christmas (2022)

Singles from Brazil305
- 1. "Cuando Hay Amor" Released: June 12, 2020

Brazil305 is the fourteenth studio album by Cuban-American singer Gloria Estefan, released by Sony Masterworks on August 13, 2020. It is her twenty-ninth album overall, and consists of re-recorded versions of her greatest hits with Brazilian rhythms especially samba, and lyrics in three languages. It also includes four new songs, featuring the lead single "Cuando Hay Amor". The album won Best Contemporary Tropical Album at the 22nd Annual Latin Grammy Awards.

== Critical reception ==
Professional ratings
Review scores
Source	Rating
Albumism	4/5 stars
AllMusic	4/5 stars

AllMusic gave the album a positive review, saying "Estefan has outdone herself on Brazil305: By re-recording her hits, she illustrates the Brazil/Cuba/Africa argument, while welcoming fans along for the ride. She bridges these cultures in an inspiring, polished program that explores new sounds and contexts, while reasserting the eminently translatable appeal and transcendent power of her own music."

Quentin Harrison from Albumism rated the album four out of five stars, saying "Although there have been many exceptions to this well-worn rule, often covers projects are not associated with progress—Estefan is an exception. She used this practice to evince her interpretive strengths and challenge herself previously with Hold Me, Thrill Me, Kiss Me and The Standards. This time, rather than turn her gaze toward the works of others, Estefan looked to her own staples and partners them with her investigative inclinations on Brazil305."

== Track listing ==
No.	Title	Writer(s)	Producer(s)	Length
1.	"Samba (Conga)"	Enrique García	E. Estefan Jr.	3:40
2.	"Un Nuevo Mundo" (Spanish adaptation of "O Homem Falou")	G. Estefan, Gonzaguinha	E. Estefan Jr.	3:50
3.	"Cuts Both Ways"	G. Estefan	E. Estefan Jr.	3:36
4.	"Cuando Hay Amor"	E. Estefan Jr., N. Tovar, A. Lopez	E. Estefan Jr.	4:01
5.	"Con Los Años Que Me Quedan"	G. Estefan, E. Estefan Jr.	E. Estefan Jr.	4:14
6.	"Tú Y Yo"	G. Estefan	E. Estefan Jr.	4:39
7.	"Hoy"	G. Zignago	E. Estefan Jr.	3:34
8.	"Ayer"	J. Marquez	E. Estefan Jr.	4:47
9.	"Rhythm Is Gonna Get You"	G. Estefan, E. García	E. Estefan Jr.	3:45
10.	"Mi Tierra"	G. Estefan, Estéfano	E. Estefan Jr.	4:36
11.	"Don't Wanna Lose You"	G. Estefan	E. Estefan Jr.	4:16
12.	"Hasta Siempre"	G. Estefan, E. Estefan Jr.	E. Estefan Jr.	3:55
13.	"Más Allá"	K. Santander	E. Estefan Jr.	5:07
14.	"Abriendo Puertas"	K. Santander	E. Estefan Jr.	3:30
15.	"Get on Your Feet"	J. De Faria, C. Ostwald, J. Casas	E. Estefan Jr.	3:25
16.	"Here We Are"	G. Estefan	E. Estefan Jr.	4:40
17.	"Only Together" (English adaptation of "O Homem Falou")	G. Estefan, Gonzaguinha	E. Estefan Jr.	3:49
18.	"Magalenha" (featuring Carlinhos Brown)	Carlinhos Brown	E. Estefan Jr.	3:41

== Charts ==
Chart performance for Brazil305
Chart (2020)	Peak position
Scottish Albums (Official Charts)	86
Spanish Albums (PROMUSICAE)	24
Swiss Albums (Schweizer Hitparade)	47
US Top Current Album Sales (Billboard)	100
US Tropical Albums (Billboard)	8

== Commercial performance ==
In the United States, Brazil305 debuted at number 8 on the Billboard Tropical Albums with a little over 1,000 album-equivalent units.

== Release history ==
Region	Date	Format
Various	August 13, 2020	CD; digital download; streaming
