= Cuts Both Ways (song) =

Single by Gloria Estefan

from the album Cuts Both Ways
- Released: May 7, 1990 (UK); June 19, 1990 (US)
- Recorded: 1988
- Genre: Pop
- Label: Epic
- Songwriter: Gloria Estefan

Gloria Estefan singles chronology
| "Oye Mi Canto (Hear My Voice)" (1989) | "Cuts Both Ways" (1990) | "Renacer" (1990) |

Music video
- "Cuts Both Ways" on YouTube

"Cuts Both Ways" is a song by Cuban-American singer Gloria Estefan, released in 1990 worldwide as the fifth and final single from her debut solo album, Cuts Both Ways (1989). It had moderate success in the US, becoming a number one hit on the Billboard Adult Contemporary chart, while reaching #44 on the US Billboard Hot 100 and #48 on the US Cash Box Top 100. The song was included exclusively on the Australasian edition of Estefan's first greatest hits album, as well as all editions of The Essential Gloria Estefan and iTunes Originals: Gloria Estefan. A rerecorded version was also included on Estefan's 2020 album, Brazil305.

== Critical reception ==
Matthew Hocter from Albumism described "Cuts Both Ways" as a "heartbreakingly beautiful song of love lost", and picked it as one of the "highlights" of the album of same name. Bill Coleman from Billboard viewed it as a "trademark-styled ballad, highlighted by lovely acoustic guitars and affecting vocals." David Giles from Music Week deemed it a "big ballad". He added, "Cliched lyrics aside; its acoustic guitar is undeniably pleasant and her voice is left attractively uncluttered, Carpenters style." A reviewer from The Network Forty noted that "shifting gears from power ballad to folk to Latin, this single has a deeper message, both musically and lyrically, than you might expect." Pop Rescue wrote that "this is really quite a nice track as it twists and turns", and "a nice plodder". Mike Soutar from Smash Hits called it a "latin-tinged sappy smoocher".

== Music video ==
A music video was produced to promote the single, featuring Estefan performing alone in a beach house. Sometimes she is seen standing by a large window, glancing out at the sea. Other times she sits by a table. In between there are also small clips of billowing water or a guitar that is being strummed. The video was later published on Estefan's official YouTube channel in March 2011. It has amassed more than 2,7 million views as of October 2021.

== Charts ==
=== Weekly charts ===
| Chart (1990) | Peak position |
|---|---|
| Australia (ARIA) | 38 |
| Canada (RPM) | 38 |
| Ireland (IRMA) | 22 |
| Italy Airplay (Music & Media) | 9 |
| Netherlands (Dutch Top 40 Tipparade) | 9 |
| Netherlands (Single Top 100) | 52 |
| New Zealand (Recorded Music NZ) | 10 |
| Poland (Polish Singles Chart) | 46 |
| UK Singles (OCC) | 49 |
| US Billboard Hot 100 | 44 |
| US Cash Box Top 100 | 48 |
| US Hot Adult Contemporary Tracks (Billboard) | 1 |

=== Year-end charts ===
| Chart (1990) | Position |
|---|---|
| New Zealand (Recorded Music NZ) | 37 |

== Release history ==
| Region | Date |
|---|---|
| UK | May 7, 1990 |
| US | June 19, 1990 |
| Europe | July 17, 1990 |

== Track listings ==
US & Canada Cassette Single (34T 73395) [May 1990]
| No. | Title | Writer(s) | Length |
|---|---|---|---|
| 1. | "Cuts Both Ways" | Gloria Estefan | 3:14 |
| 2. | "Nothin' New" | Gloria Estefan | 3:49 |

US & Canada 7" Vinyl Single (34 73395) [May 1990]
| No. | Title | Writer(s) | Length |
|---|---|---|---|
| 1. | "Cuts Both Ways" | Gloria Estefan | 3:14 |
| 2. | "Nothin' New" | Gloria Estefan | 3:49 |

US Promo CD Single (ESK 73395) [May 1990]
| No. | Title | Writer(s) | Length |
|---|---|---|---|
| 1. | "Cuts Both Ways" | Gloria Estefan | 3:14 |

Europe 3" CD Single (655982 1) [July 1990]
| No. | Title | Writer(s) | Length |
|---|---|---|---|
| 1. | "Cuts Both Ways" | Gloria Estefan | 3:14 |
| 2. | "You Made A Fool Of Me" | Wesley B. Wright | 2:55 |

Europe 3" CD-Maxi Single (655982 3) [July 1990]
| No. | Title | Writer(s) | Length |
|---|---|---|---|
| 1. | "Cuts Both Ways" | Gloria Estefan | 3:14 |
| 2. | "Here We Are" | Gloria Estefan | 4:50 |
| 3. | "You Made A Fool Of Me" | Wesley B. Wright | 2:55 |
| 4. | "I Want You So Bad" | Lawrence Dermer, Joe Galdo & Rafael Vigil | 4:18 |

Europe 7" Vinyl Single (655982 7) [July 1990]
| No. | Title | Writer(s) | Length |
|---|---|---|---|
| 1. | "Cuts Both Ways" | Gloria Estefan | 3:14 |
| 2. | "You Made A Fool Of Me" | Wesley B. Wright | 2:55 |

Europe 12" Vinyl Single (655982 6) [July 1990]
| No. | Title | Writer(s) | Length |
|---|---|---|---|
| 1. | "Cuts Both Ways" | Gloria Estefan | 3:14 |
| 2. | "Here We Are" | Gloria Estefan | 4:50 |
| 3. | "You Made A Fool Of Me" | Wesley B. Wright | 2:55 |
| 4. | "I Want You So Bad" | Lawrence Dermer, Joe Galdo & Rafael Vigil | 4:18 |

UK CD-Maxi Single (The Ballads - Vol. II) [655982 2] {May 1990}
| No. | Title | Writer(s) | Length |
|---|---|---|---|
| 1. | "Cuts Both Ways" | Gloria Estefan | 3:14 |
| 2. | "Here We Are" | Gloria Estefan | 4:50 |
| 3. | "You Made A Fool Of Me" | Wesley B. Wright | 2:55 |
| 4. | "I Want You So Bad" | Lawrence Dermer, Joe Galdo & Rafael Vigil | 4:18 |

UK Cassette Single (655982 4) [May 1990]
| No. | Title | Writer(s) | Length |
|---|---|---|---|
| 1. | "Cuts Both Ways" | Gloria Estefan | 3:14 |
| 2. | "You Made A Fool Of Me" | Wesley B. Wright | 2:55 |

UK 7" Vinyl Single #1 (655982 7) [May 1990]
| No. | Title | Writer(s) | Length |
|---|---|---|---|
| 1. | "Cuts Both Ways" | Gloria Estefan | 3:14 |
| 2. | "You Made A Fool Of Me" | Wesley B. Wright | 2:55 |

UK 7" Vinyl Single #2 (Limited Edition Posterbag) [655982 0] {May 1990}
| No. | Title | Writer(s) | Length |
|---|---|---|---|
| 1. | "Cuts Both Ways" | Gloria Estefan | 3:14 |
| 2. | "You Made A Fool Of Me" | Wesley B. Wright | 2:55 |

UK 12" Vinyl Single (The Ballads - Vol. II) [655982 6] {May 1990}
| No. | Title | Writer(s) | Length |
|---|---|---|---|
| 1. | "Cuts Both Ways" | Gloria Estefan | 3:14 |
| 2. | "Here We Are" | Gloria Estefan | 4:50 |
| 3. | "You Made A Fool Of Me" | Wesley B. Wright | 2:55 |
| 4. | "I Want You So Bad" | Lawrence Dermer, Joe Galdo & Rafael Vigil | 4:18 |

Spain Promo 7" Vinyl Single (ARIE 2505) [July 1990]
| No. | Title | Writer(s) | Length |
|---|---|---|---|
| 1. | "Cuts Both Ways" | Gloria Estefan | 3:14 |

Australia Cassette Single (655982 4) [July 1990]
| No. | Title | Writer(s) | Length |
|---|---|---|---|
| 1. | "Cuts Both Ways" | Gloria Estefan | 3:14 |
| 2. | "You Made A Fool Of Me" | Wesley B. Wright | 2:55 |

Australia 7" Vinyl Single (655982 7) [July 1990]
| No. | Title | Writer(s) | Length |
|---|---|---|---|
| 1. | "Cuts Both Ways" | Gloria Estefan | 3:14 |
| 2. | "You Made A Fool Of Me" | Wesley B. Wright | 2:55 |

Australia 12" Vinyl Single (655982 6) [July 1990]
| No. | Title | Writer(s) | Length |
|---|---|---|---|
| 1. | "Cuts Both Ways" | Gloria Estefan | 3:14 |
| 2. | "Here We Are" | Gloria Estefan | 4:50 |
| 3. | "You Made A Fool Of Me" | Wesley B. Wright | 2:55 |
| 4. | "I Want You So Bad" | Lawrence Dermer, Joe Galdo & Rafael Vigil | 4:18 |

Japan 3" CD Single (ESDA 7038) [July 21, 1990]
| No. | Title | Writer(s) | Length |
|---|---|---|---|
| 1. | "Cuts Both Ways" | Gloria Estefan | 3:14 |
| 2. | "Nothin' New" | Gloria Estefan | 3:49 |
