= Here We Are (Gloria Estefan song) =

1989 single by Gloria Estefan

- US retail cassette single cover

Single by Gloria Estefan

from the album Cuts Both Ways
- B-side: “1-2-3” (Live); ”Don't Let The Sun Go Down On Me” (U.K.)
- Released: December 5, 1989
- Genre: Pop
- Length: 4:49
- Label: Epic
- Songwriter: Gloria Estefan
- Producers: Emilio Estefan, Jr.; Jorge Casas; Clay Ostwald

Gloria Estefan singles chronology
"Get on Your Feet" (1989)	"Here We Are" (1989)	"Oye Mi Canto (Hear My Voice)" (1990)

Music video
- "Here We Are" on YouTube

"Here We Are" is a song by Cuban-American singer-songwriter Gloria Estefan. It was released on December 5, 1989, as the third single taken from her debut solo studio album Cuts Both Ways (1989) by Epic Records. It was solely written by Estefan while production was provided by husband Emilio Estefan, Jr., Jorge Casas, and Clay Ostwald.

Receiving a positive reception among critics, "Here We Are" became another success for the singer. It reached the top ten in Canada, Ireland, and the United States, while becoming her biggest hit on the Adult Contemporary chart. Estefan recorded a Portuguese version of the track, "Toda Pra Você," which is included in her compilation Exitos De Gloria Estefan (1990).

As a duet for her special television concert All The Way Concert, Canadian singer Celine Dion performed this song, while Estefan sang Dion's song, "Because You Loved Me". A new Spanish version called "Tu y yo" was released in July 2019 on Estefan's official YouTube channel, celebrating the 30th anniversary of the song. This version was also included on her 2020 album Brazil305.

== Chart performance ==
"Here We Are" continued Estefan's success, peaking at number five on the Billboard Hot 100 and number nine on the Cash Box Top 100 charts. It also topped the Hot Adult Contemporary chart for five weeks. Overseas, the song reached number 23 on the UK Singles Chart, number seven in Ireland and number 13 in the Netherlands.

== Critical reception ==
Upon the release, Bill Coleman from Billboard remarked that the song's "beautifully etched acoustic guitar strumming frames Estefan's warm and inviting vocals". A reviewer from Entertainment Weekly felt it "croon along smoothly". British Lennox Herald described it as a "ballad of heartbreaking lament", where Estefan demonstrates her "glorious feel for a ballad." The reviewer concluded that the Carpenters "would have been proud of you". Ian McCann from NME felt that Estefan "does her best Carpenters impression."

== Retrospective response ==
In a 2019 retrospective review, Matthew Hocter from Albumism said "Here We Are" is the "epitome of what ‘80s ballads executed with pure perfection were all about". He named it a "highlight" of the Cuts Both Ways album. AllMusic editor Jason Birchmeier declared it as a "super" song. Maryann Scheufele from AXS featured it in her ranking of 10 Best Gloria Estefan Songs in 2014, calling it a "beautiful love song". She added that it "suggests how quickly time passes and love happens. Gloria Estefan has a powerful voice in this love song as she sings that there is "nothing I can do to keep from loving you" believably. Be reassured by love as you listen." In a 2016 review, Pop Rescue noted that acoustic guitars "gently strum in the background, and a scattering of piano help this song step back and let Gloria’s vocals shine."

== Usage in media ==
"Here We Are" was used for the Cruz and Eden characters on the American soap opera Santa Barbara. The song also appeared in an episode of the NBC daytime soap opera Another World in early 1990 as well as a 1990 episode of One Life to Live on ABC.

== Track listings and formats ==
=== Original release ===
7-inch, cassette, and CD single

1. "Here We Are" – 4:49
2. "1-2-3" (Live from the Homecoming Concert) – 3:52

12-inch single

1. "Here We Are" – 4:49
2. "1-2-3" (Live) – 3:53
3. "Surrender" (from Anything for You) – 4:02

=== UK and European release ===
7-inch and UK cassette single

1. "Here We Are" – 4:19
2. "Don't Let the Sun Go Down on Me" – 5:24

12-inch and CD single

1. "Here We Are" – 4:50
2. "Don't Let the Sun Go Down on Me" – 6:11
3. "Dr. Beat" (Live) – 5:20

== Charts ==
=== Weekly charts ===
Weekly chart performance for "Here We Are"
Chart (1989–90)	Peak position
Australia (ARIA)	20
Belgium (Ultratop 50 Flanders)	19
Canada Top Singles (RPM)	7
Canada Adult Contemporary (RPM)	1
Canada (The Record)	18
Europe (Eurochart Hot 100)	55
Ireland (IRMA)	7
Japan (Tokio Hot 100)	13
Luxembourg (Radio Luxembourg)	19
Netherlands (Dutch Top 40)	14
Netherlands (Single Top 100)	13
Sweden (Sverigetopplistan)	20
UK Singles (Official Charts)	23
US Billboard Hot 100	6
US Adult Contemporary (Billboard)	1
US Adult Contemporary (Radio & Records)	1
US Contemporary Hit Radio (Radio & Records)	7
West Germany (GfK)	64

=== Year-end charts ===
Year-end chart performance for "Here We Are"
Chart (1990)	Position
Brazil (Brazilian Singles Chart)	88
Canada Top Singles (RPM)	90
US Billboard Hot 100	74
US Adult Contemporary (Radio & Records)	10
US CHR (Radio & Records)	63

== Official versions ==
1. Album Version — (4:49)
2. Portuguese Version ("Toda Prá Você") — (4:49)
3. English Version on Brazil305 — (4:40)
4. Spanish Version on Brazil305 ("Tú Y Yo") — (4:40)

== Release history ==
Region	Date
US	November 1989
Europe	November 1989
Japan	January 1990
UK	February 1990
