= Prisoner of Love (Miami Sound Machine song) =

Single by Miami Sound Machine

from the album Eyes of Innocence
- B-side: "Toda Tuya (Toda Dia Eva Dia De Indio)"
- Released: September 1984 (Europe)
- Recorded: 1983–1984
- Genre: Pop; dance-pop
- Length: 3:55
- Label: Epic
- Songwriter(s): Enrique Garcia
- Producer(s): Emilio Estefan, Jr.

Miami Sound Machine singles chronology
"Dr. Beat" (1984)	"Prisoner of Love" (1984)	"I Need a Man" (1984)

"Prisoner of Love" was the second single released by the American band Miami Sound Machine on their first English language album, and eighth overall, Eyes of Innocence. The song was written by the band's drummer Enrique "Kiki" Garcia.

== Song history ==
The single was released worldwide following the release of the album with great expectations. The lead single, "Dr. Beat", also written by Enrique Garcia, had moderate success, and performed especially well on the dance charts. "Prisoner of Love" was unable to follow the success, debuting on the UK Singles Chart at only number 98 and failing to chart elsewhere. The single was only released in Europe, Australia and Japan. In the United States, "I Need a Man" was released as the second single.

== Track listing ==
7" single

1. "Prisoner of Love" (Enrique E. Garcia) – 3:55
2. "I Need Your Love" (Enrique E. Garcia) – 4:33

12" single

1. "Prisoner of Love (Remix)" (Enrique E. Garcia) – 6:36 (remixed by Pablo Flores)
2. "Prisoner of Love (Instrumental)" (Enrique E. Garcia) – 4:45
3. "Toda Tuya (Todo Dia Eva Dia De Indio)" (Gloria M. Estefan, Jorge Ben) – 4:39

== Charts ==
Chart (1984)	Peak position
UK Singles (OCC)	98
