= Cuando Hay Amor =

2020 song by Gloria Estefan

Single by Gloria Estefan

from the album Brazil305
- Released: June 12, 2020
- Recorded: Crescent Moon Studios
- Genre: Latin pop; Samba
- Length: 4:01
- Label: Crescent Moon; Sony Music Latin
- Songwriters: Nicolás Tovar; Emilio Estefan; Andrea López
- Producer: Emilio Estefan

Gloria Estefan singles chronology
"Almost Like Praying" (2017)	"Cuando Hay Amor" (2020)	"Puedes Llegar" (2021)

"Cuando Hay Amor" ("When There Is Love") is a song by Cuban-American singer Gloria Estefan. It was officially released on June 12, 2020, as the lead single from Estefan's fourteenth studio album, Brazil305 (2020). It was written by Emilio Estefan, Nicolás Tovar and newcomer, Andrea López. It is a Latin pop song considered a celebration of love set to the beat of Brazilian and Colombian drums.

== Release ==
Originally slated for release in Fall 2019, the single was pushed back to Summer 2020. It was Estefan's first song in seven years and serves as the lead single of her album, Brazil305 which was released in August 2020.

== Music video ==
The same date it was released, a music video was made available and features Estefan dancing Samba de Roda along with a group of Brazilian women of all ages. Filmed in Salvador, Bahia, was shot in front of Lagoa do Abaeté, the lake where the original Bahianas, at the end of the 19th century, would do their washing while singing and improvising songs. Some scenes were also shot in Rio de Janeiro.

== Charts ==
=== Weekly charts ===
Chart (2020)	Peak position
Cuba (Popnable)	3
Puerto Rico Pop (Monitor Latino)	6
US Tropical Airplay (Billboard)	8
US Latin Pop Airplay (Billboard)	16

=== Year-end charts ===
Chart (2020)	Peak position
Puerto Rico Pop (Monitor Latino)	37
US Tropical Airplay Songs (Billboard)	29
