= Cuts Both Ways =

Studio album by Gloria Estefan
- Released: July 10, 1989
- Recorded: 1988–1989
- Studios: Criteria Studios (Miami, Florida)
- Genre: Pop
- Length: 49:29 (CD) / 40:23 (LP)
- Label: Epic
- Producers: Emilio Estefan, Jr.; Jorge Casas; Clay Ostwald

Gloria Estefan chronology
Let It Loose / Anything for You (1987)	Cuts Both Ways (1989)	Éxitos de Gloria Estefan (1990)

Singles from Cuts Both Ways
- 1. "Don't Wanna Lose You" Released: June 1989; 2. "Oye Mi Canto (Hear My Voice)" Released: September 1989 (UK); 3. "Get On Your Feet" Released: September 1989 (US); 4. "Here We Are" Released: November 1989; 5. "Cuts Both Ways" Released: May 1990

Professional ratings
Review scores
Source	Rating
AllMusic	4/5 stars
Robert Christgau	C
Number One	3/5 stars
The Rolling Stone Album Guide	2.5/5 stars

Cuts Both Ways (also released as Doblemente Herida) is the debut solo album by American recording artist Gloria Estefan. Though the release marked the first time Estefan was billed as a solo artist, Miami Sound Machine still performed instrumentation for the album. It has sold over 4 million copies worldwide.

The album includes the Billboard Hot 100 number one single "Don't Wanna Lose You" and the Billboard Adult Contemporary number one single "Cuts Both Ways". It also includes the hit singles "Get on Your Feet " and "Here We Are".

== History ==
In 1987, after a decade of being the lead singer of Miami Sound Machine, she was credited above the group name (Gloria Estefan and Miami Sound Machine) on their album Let It Loose. By 1989, Gloria Estefan was one of the most successful female Latin artists in the world. With the release of Cuts Both Ways, Estefan was marketed as a solo artist, but Miami Sound Machine continued to perform as her backing band in the studio and on tour (however, the only original member of MSM to play on the album besides Estefan was her husband/producer, Emilio).

The album reached the top ten on the US Billboard 200 chart and peaked at number 1 in the UK, Australia and New Zealand.

The first single from the album was "Don't Wanna Lose You", which became one of Estefan's biggest hits, reaching number 1 on the US Billboard Hot 100 (her second US number one) and was certified Gold by the RIAA. It also reached the top ten in the Netherlands, Ireland and the UK. Later releases from Cuts Both Ways were the commercially successful singles "Here We Are", "Oye mi Canto", and "Get on Your Feet". The title track was released as the final single from the album and was a number one hit on the Billboard Adult Contemporary chart.

Jon Secada provided background vocals for the album. Emilio Estefan, Jorge Casas and Clay Ostwald received a Grammy Award nomination for Producer of the Year, Non-Classical for their work in Cuts Both Ways.

== Track listing ==
All tracks are written by Gloria Estefan, except where noted.

Side one
No.	Title	Writer(s)	Length
1.	"Ay, Ay, I"		3:49
2.	"Here We Are"		4:51
3.	"Say"	Jon Secada; Bill Duncan	3:41
4.	"Think About You Now"	Jorge Casas	4:20
5.	"Nothin' New"		3:50

Side two
No.	Title	Writer(s)	Length
6.	"Oye Mi Canto (Hear My Voice)"	Estefan; Casas; Clay Ostwald	4:52
7.	"Don't Wanna Lose You"		4:12
8.	"Get on Your Feet"	John DeFaria; Casas; Ostwald	3:38
9.	"Your Love Is Bad For Me"		3:50
10.	"Cuts Both Ways"		3:16
Total length:			40:23

CD/cassette/MiniDisc bonus tracks
No.	Title	Writer(s)	Length
11.	"Oye Mi Canto" (Spanish version)	Estefan; Casas; Ostwald	4:58
12.	"Si Voy A Perderte" (Don't Wanna Lose You) (Spanish version)		4:07
Total length:			49:29

Japan CD bonus track
No.	Title	Length
13.	"Ay, Ay, I" (extended mix)	6:05
Total length:		55:40

=== Notes ===
- The Mexican LP edition only contains the Spanish versions of "Oye Mi Canto" and "Don't Wanna Lose You" ("Si Voy A Perderte").
- Brazilian editions include the Portuguese versions of "Here We Are" ("Toda Prá Você"), "Your Love Is Bad for Me" ("Amor Fatal") and "Don't Wanna Lose You" ("Se Tenho Que Te Perder").
- Brazilian LP and cassette editions exclude Spanish songs and the English versions of "Here We Are" and "Your Love Is Bad for Me", while Brazilian CD editions include all English, Spanish and Portuguese tracks.
- Several Hispanic American LP editions other than the Mexican edition contain all Spanish and English tracks. On most Latin American editions, the track listing of the album is rearranged.

== Singles ==
#	Title	Date
1.	"Don't Wanna Lose You / Si Voy A Perderte"	June 21, 1989
2.	"Get on Your Feet"	September 30, 1989 (US)
3.	"Here We Are"	December 1989 (US)
4.	"Oye Mi Canto (Hear My Voice)"	April 1990 (US)
5.	"Cuts Both Ways"	June 1990 (US)

== Release history ==
Region	Date
United States	July 10, 1989
Europe	July 10, 1989
Japan	July 12, 1989
United Kingdom	July 24, 1989

== Charts ==
=== Weekly charts ===
Chart (1989–1990)	Peak position
Australian Albums (ARIA)	1
Canadian Albums (RPM)	42
Dutch Albums (Album Top 100)	1
European Albums (Music & Media)	7
German Albums (Offizielle Top 100)	27
New Zealand Albums (RMNZ)	1
Norwegian Albums (VG-lista)	4
Spanish Albums (Promusicae)	13
Swedish Albums (Sverigetopplistan)	18
Swiss Albums (Schweizer Hitparade)	13
UK Albums (Official Charts)	1
US Billboard 200	8
US Latin Pop Albums (Billboard)	11
US Top R&B/Hip-Hop Albums (Billboard)	80

=== Year-end charts ===
Chart (1989)	Position
Dutch Albums (Album Top 100)	4
US Billboard 200	69

Chart (1990)	Position
Australian Albums (ARIA)	11
Dutch Albums (Album Top 100)	65
German Albums (Offizielle Top 100)	60
New Zealand Albums (RMNZ)	9
US Billboard 200	27

== Certifications and sales ==
Region	Certification	Certified units/sales
Australia (ARIA)	3× Platinum	210,000^{^}
Canada (Music Canada)	Platinum	100,000^{^}
Finland (Musiikkituottajat)	Gold	35,476
Germany (BVMI)	Gold	250,000^{^}
Japan (RIAJ)	Gold	100,000^{^}
New Zealand (RMNZ)	Platinum	15,000^{^}
Netherlands (NVPI)	Platinum	100,000^{^}
Spain (Promusicae)	Platinum	150,000
Sweden (GLF)	Gold	50,000^{^}
Switzerland (IFPI Switzerland)	Gold	25,000^{^}
United Kingdom (BPI)	3× Platinum	900,000^{^}
United States (RIAA)	3× Platinum	3,000,000^{^}
^{^} Shipments figures based on certification alone.

== Personnel ==
Miami Sound Machine

- Gloria Estefan – vocals, backing vocals (1, 3, 5, 6, 8, 9, 11), arrangements (1, 2, 5–7, 11, 12), horn arrangements (6, 11)
- Clay Ostwald – programming, performer, acoustic piano, synthesizers, arrangements, horn arrangements (6, 11), backing vocals (8)
- John De Faria – electric guitar, acoustic guitar, guitar solo (4), arrangements (8)
- Jorge Casas – programming, performer, electric bass, fretless bass, arrangements, acoustic guitar (3, 6, 7, 12), backing vocals (6, 8, 9, 11), horn arrangements (6, 11)
- Robert Rodriguez – drums
- Rafael Padilla – percussion
- Mike Scaglione – saxophones, sax solo (8)
- Teddy Mulet – trombone, trumpet, trumpet solo (6, 11), backing vocals (6, 11), horn arrangements (6, 11)
- Randy Barlow – trumpet, backing vocals (6, 8, 11)

Additional musicians

- Paquito Hechavarría – acoustic piano (6, 11)
- Paco Fonta – acoustic guitar (6, 11)
- Michael Thompson – electric guitar (6, 11)
- Emilio Estefan Jr. – congas (1)
- John Haag – arrangements (5)
- Tom McWilliams – arrangements (5)
- Scott Shapiro – arrangements (5)
- Efrain Enriquez – arrangements (9)
- Jon Secada – backing vocals (4, 6, 7, 11, 12)
- Betty Wright – backing vocals (9)

=== Production ===
- Emilio Estefan – producer
- Jorge Casas – producer
- Clay Ostwald – producer
- Eric Schilling – engineer, mixing (1, 3–6, 8–12)
- Phil Ramone – mixing (2, 10)
- Humberto Gatica – mixing (7)
- John Haag – recording assistant, additional mixing (6, 11)
- Ted Stein – recording assistant
- Dana Horowitz – additional recording assistant
- Roger Hughes – additional recording assistant
- Steve Whaley – additional recording assistant
- Carlos Nieto – additional mixing (2, 10)
- Mauricio Guerrero – additional mixing (7)
- Greg Laney – additional mixing (7)
- Bob Ludwig – mastering at Masterdisk (New York City, New York)
- David Coleman – art direction
- Nancy Donald – art direction
- Randee St. Nicholas – photography
- Eric Bernard – hair and make-up for Gloria Estefan
- Samy – hair and make-up for the band
- Vivian Turner – wardrobe
