= Go Away (Gloria Estefan song) =

Single by Gloria Estefan

from the album Greatest Hits and Made in America soundtrack
- Released: March 1993
- Recorded: 1991–1992
- Genre: Hi-NRG; house; salsa
- Length: 4:17
- Label: Epic
- Songwriters: Gloria Estefan; Lawrence Dermer

Gloria Estefan singles chronology
"I See Your Smile" (1992)	"Go Away" (1993)	"Mi Tierra" (1993)

Music video
- "Go Away" on YouTube

"Go Away" is a song by Cuban American singer and songwriter Gloria Estefan. It was one of four new songs to be included on her 1992 Greatest Hits album, and was remixed and released as a single in March 1993 by Epic Records. An uptempo latin-style dance track, the song was written by Estefan with Lawrence Dermer and is much in the style of Estefan's earlier songs with the Miami Sound Machine. It was a club hit throughout Europe and America, and was featured on the soundtrack to the 1993 film Made in America, starring Whoopi Goldberg and Ted Danson. "Go Away" reached the UK Top 20 and US Dance Chart Top 5.

== Critical reception ==
AllMusic editor Jose F. Promis described "Go Away" as a "irresistible Latin-flavored dance track". Larry Flick from Billboard magazine remarked that "the traditional salsa flavor that has dominated her previous uptempo tunes is evident, but it is tempered with savvy house elements. Also, Estefan's vocal is easily her most relaxed and playful to date." He also wrote, "Tropical spice and a hi-NRG tempo are a happy marriage here, while cute vocals and sound effects are icing on the cake." Dave Sholin from the Gavin Report felt the song is a "fun, upbeat production." In his weekly UK chart commentary, James Masterton stated, "Gloria Estefan makes a strong comeback with another track from her Greatest Hits album, and in a similar vein to the Miami Hitmix".

Pan-European magazine Music & Media wrote that "the Cuban exile Estefan addresses her anger against dictator Fidel Castro. People have a right to party, our little rebel sings, musically going back to her Latin roots." Alan Jones from Music Week gave it three out of five and named it Pick of the Week, saying that the song finds the singer "camping it up". He added, "A hit, but not a big one." A reviewer from The Network Forty felt "it's been too long since Gloria Estefan has given us an uptempo hit record", and noted that "Go Away" is reminiscent of the early Miami Sound Machine hits; "it has the energy of 'Rhythm Is Gonna Get You' and '1-2-3'." James Hamilton from the Record Mirror Dance Update described it as "catchy [and] conga kicking".

== Music video ==
The accompanying music video was directed by American television and film director and producer Kevin Layne. It was later made available on YouTube in October 2013. The video has amassed over 595,000 views as of February 2025.

== Official versions ==
1. Album Version – 4:37
2. Radio Edit (aka Single Remix) – John Haag & Pablo Flores – 3:49
3. 12" Mix (aka 12" Remix) – John Haag & Pablo Flores – 6:14
4. Dub Mix – John Haag & Pablo Flores – 6:25

1. Underground Vocal Mix – Tommy Musto – 6:30
2. Underground Dub – Tommy Musto – 6:30
3. Underground Instrumental Mix – Tommy Musto – 6:14
4. Bonus Beats – Tommy Musto – 2:05

== Track listings ==
US & Canada CD Maxi-Single (49K 74843) [April 6, 1993]
No.	Title	Writer(s)	Length
1.	"Go Away" (Album Version)	Gloria Estefan, Lawrence Dermer	4:17
2.	"Go Away" (12" Mix)	Gloria Estefan, Lawrence Dermer	6:14
3.	"Go Away" (Underground Vocal Mix)	Gloria Estefan, Lawrence Dermer	6:30
4.	"Words Get In The Way" (Live in Miami from the Homecoming Concert, 1988)	Gloria Estefan	5:02
5.	"Megamix" (Dr. Beat, Conga, Rhythm Is Gonna Get You, 1-2-3, Get On Your Feet)	Enrique Garcia, Gloria Estefan, John DeFaria, Jorge Casas, Clay Ostwald	5:20

US & Canada Cassette Single (34T 74920) [April 6, 1993]
No.	Title	Writer(s)	Length
1.	"Go Away" (Radio Edit)	Gloria Estefan, Lawrence Dermer	3:49
2.	"Go Away" (Album Version)	Gloria Estefan, Lawrence Dermer	4:17

US & Canada 7" Vinyl Single (34 74920) [April 6, 1993]
No.	Title	Writer(s)	Length
1.	"Go Away" (Radio Edit)	Gloria Estefan, Lawrence Dermer	3:49
2.	"Go Away" (Album Version)	Gloria Estefan, Lawrence Dermer	4:17

US & Canada 12" Vinyl Single (49 74843) [April 6, 1993]
No.	Title	Writer(s)	Length
1.	"Go Away" (Underground Vocal Mix)	Gloria Estefan, Lawrence Dermer	6:30
2.	"Go Away" (Underground Instrumental Mix)	Gloria Estefan, Lawrence Dermer	6:14
3.	"Go Away" (Bonus Beats)	Gloria Estefan, Lawrence Dermer	2:05
4.	"Go Away" (12" Mix)	Gloria Estefan, Lawrence Dermer	6:14
5.	"Go Away" (Dub Mix)	Gloria Estefan, Lawrence Dermer	6:25
6.	"Megamix" (Dr. Beat, Conga, Rhythm Is Gonna Get You, 1-2-3, Get On Your Feet)	Enrique Garcia, Gloria Estefan, John DeFaria, Jorge Casas, Clay Ostwald	5:20

US Promo CD Single (ESK 74920) [April 1993]
No.	Title	Writer(s)	Length
1.	"Go Away" (Radio Edit)	Gloria Estefan, Lawrence Dermer	3:49

US Promo 12" Vinyl Single (EAS 5027) [April 1993]
No.	Title	Writer(s)	Length
1.	"Go Away" (Underground Dub)	Gloria Estefan, Lawrence Dermer	6:30
2.	"Go Away" (Underground Instrumental Mix)	Gloria Estefan, Lawrence Dermer	6:14
3.	"Go Away" (Bonus Beats)	Gloria Estefan, Lawrence Dermer	2:05
4.	"Go Away" (12" Mix)	Gloria Estefan, Lawrence Dermer	6:14
5.	"Go Away" (Dub Mix)	Gloria Estefan, Lawrence Dermer	6:25
6.	"Megamix" (Dr. Beat, Conga, Rhythm Is Gonna Get You, 1-2-3, Get On Your Feet)	Enrique Garcia, Gloria Estefan, John DeFaria, Jorge Casas, Clay Ostwald	5:20

Europe CD Single (EPC 659095 1) [April 1993]
No.	Title	Writer(s)	Length
1.	"Go Away" (Single Remix)	Gloria Estefan, Lawrence Dermer	3:49
2.	"Can't Forget You"	Jorge Casas, Jon Secada, Clay Ostwald	4:10

Europe CD Maxi-Single (EPC 659095 2) [April 1993]
No.	Title	Writer(s)	Length
1.	"Go Away" (Single Remix)	Gloria Estefan, Lawrence Dermer	3:49
2.	"Go Away" (12" Remix)	Gloria Estefan, Lawrence Dermer	6:14
3.	"Go Away" (Tommy Musto's Underground Vocal Mix)	Gloria Estefan, Lawrence Dermer	6:30
4.	"Can't Forget You"	Jorge Casas, Jon Secada, Clay Ostwald	4:10

Europe 12" Vinyl Single (659095 6) [April 1993]
No.	Title	Writer(s)	Length
1.	"Go Away" (12" Remix)	Gloria Estefan, Lawrence Dermer	6:14
2.	"Go Away" (Album Version)	Gloria Estefan, Lawrence Dermer	4:17
3.	"Go Away" (Tommy Musto's Underground Vocal Mix)	Gloria Estefan, Lawrence Dermer	6:30
4.	"Go Away" (Tommy Musto's Underground Instrumental Mix)	Gloria Estefan, Lawrence Dermer	6:14

Dutch Cassette Maxi-Single (659095 4) [April 1993]
No.	Title	Writer(s)	Length
1.	"Go Away" (12" Mix)	Gloria Estefan, Lawrence Dermer	6:14
2.	"Go Away" (Underground Vocal Mix)	Gloria Estefan, Lawrence Dermer	6:30
3.	"Words Get In The Way" (Live in Miami from the Homecoming Concert, 1988)	Gloria Estefan	5:02
4.	"Megamix" (Dr. Beat, Conga, Rhythm Is Gonna Get You, 1-2-3, Get On Your Feet)	Enrique Garcia, Gloria Estefan, John DeFaria, Jorge Casas, Clay Ostwald	5:20
5.	"Go Away" (Album Version)	Gloria Estefan, Lawrence Dermer	4:17

Spain 12" Vinyl Single (EPC 659095 6) [April 1993]
No.	Title	Writer(s)	Length
1.	"Go Away" (12" Remix)	Gloria Estefan, Lawrence Dermer	6:14
2.	"Go Away" (Album Version)	Gloria Estefan, Lawrence Dermer	4:17
3.	"Go Away" (Tommy Musto's Underground Vocal Mix)	Gloria Estefan, Lawrence Dermer	6:30
4.	"Go Away" (Tommy Musto's Underground Instrumental Mix)	Gloria Estefan, Lawrence Dermer	6:14

Spain Promo 7" Vinyl Single (ARIE 3174) [April 1993]
No.	Title	Writer(s)	Length
1.	"Go Away"	Gloria Estefan, Lawrence Dermer	4:17

UK CD Maxi-Single (659095 2) [April 1993]
No.	Title	Writer(s)	Length
1.	"Go Away" (Single Remix)	Gloria Estefan, Lawrence Dermer	3:49
2.	"Go Away" (12" Remix)	Gloria Estefan, Lawrence Dermer	6:14
3.	"Go Away" (Tommy Musto's Underground Vocal Mix)	Gloria Estefan, Lawrence Dermer	6:30
4.	"Can't Forget You"	Jorge Casas, Jon Secada, Clay Ostwald	4:10

UK Cassette Single (659095 4) [April 1993]
No.	Title	Writer(s)	Length
1.	"Go Away" (Single Remix)	Gloria Estefan, Lawrence Dermer	3:49
2.	"Can't Forget You"	Jorge Casas, Jon Secada, Clay Ostwald	4:10

UK 12" Vinyl Single (659095 6) [April 1993]
No.	Title	Writer(s)	Length
1.	"Go Away" (12" Remix)	Gloria Estefan, Lawrence Dermer	6:14
2.	"Go Away" (Album Version)	Gloria Estefan, Lawrence Dermer	4:17
3.	"Go Away" (Tommy Musto's Underground Vocal Mix)	Gloria Estefan, Lawrence Dermer	6:30
4.	"Go Away" (Tommy Musto's Underground Instrumental Mix)	Gloria Estefan, Lawrence Dermer	6:14

UK Promo 12" Vinyl Single (XPR 1895) [April 1993]
No.	Title	Writer(s)	Length
1.	"Go Away" (Tommy Musto's Underground Vocal Mix)	Gloria Estefan, Lawrence Dermer	6:30
2.	"Go Away" (Tommy Musto's Underground Instrumental Mix)	Gloria Estefan, Lawrence Dermer	6:14
3.	"Go Away" (Bonus Beats)	Gloria Estefan, Lawrence Dermer	2:05

Thailand Cassette Maxi-Single (659095 4) [April 1993]
No.	Title	Writer(s)	Length
1.	"Go Away" (12" Mix)	Gloria Estefan, Lawrence Dermer	6:14
2.	"Go Away" (Underground Vocal Mix)	Gloria Estefan, Lawrence Dermer	6:30
3.	"Words Get In The Way" (Live in Miami from the Homecoming Concert, 1988)	Gloria Estefan	5:02
4.	"Megamix" (Dr. Beat, Conga, Rhythm Is Gonna Get You, 1-2-3, Get On Your Feet)	Enrique Garcia, Gloria Estefan, John DeFaria, Jorge Casas, Clay Ostwald	5:20
5.	"Go Away" (Album Version)	Gloria Estefan, Lawrence Dermer	4:17

== Charts ==
Chart (1993)	Peak position
Colombia (Colombian Singles Chart)	10
Europe (Eurochart Hot 100)	38
Ireland (IRMA)	22
Israel (Israeli Singles Chart)	23
Japan (Tokyo)	26
Poland (Polish Singles Chart)	41
UK Singles (Official Charts)	13
UK Airplay (Music Week)	13
UK Dance (Music Week)	6
US Bubbling Under Hot 100 (Billboard)	3
US Dance Club Songs (Billboard)	15
US Hot Dance Music/Maxi-Singles Sales (Billboard)	4
