= Primitive Love =

- Standard cover art. The original UK cover used the image of Gloria Estefan shown on the "Bad Boy" single.

Studio album by Miami Sound Machine
- Released: August 13, 1985
- Recorded: 1984−1985
- Studios: New River (Fort Lauderdale); International Sound (Miami)
- Genre: Dance-pop
- Length: 39:24
- Labels: Epic; CBS Discos International
- Producer: Emilio Estefan Jr.

Miami Sound Machine chronology
Eyes of Innocence (1984)	Primitive Love (1985)	Let It Loose / Anything For You (1987)

Singles from Primitive Love
- 1. "Conga" Released: September 1985; 2. "Bad Boy" Released: February 1986; 3. "Words Get in the Way" Released: June 1986; 4. "Falling in Love (Uh-Oh)" Released: October 1986

Professional ratings
Review scores
Source	Rating
AllMusic	3.5/5 stars
Robert Christgau	B

Primitive Love is the ninth studio album and second English-language record by the Miami Sound Machine, released in August 1985, by Epic Records. The album has sold over 6 million copies worldwide. The album includes the top 10 Billboard Hot 100 singles "Conga", "Bad Boy", and "Words Get in the Way".

== Background ==
Previous releases by Miami Sound Machine had failed to achieve much in the way of crossover success. However, with the release of Primitive Love in 1985, they achieved success both in the United States and abroad. The album was the band's first appearance on the American albums chart, reaching #21 on the Billboard 200. The album ended the year on the 1986 Billboard Year End Charts at number ten.

Three singles released from this album reached the Top 10 of the Billboard Hot 100 chart: "Conga" peaked at number ten; "Bad Boy" reached number eight; "Words Get in the Way" was the highest-charting single from this album (#5); and "Falling in Love (Uh-Oh)" climbed to number 25.

A 2CD remastered version of the album was scheduled for release on March 31, 2017 by Vibe on Records, but it was postponed because Estefan was working on a new album at that time. To date, there is still no new date set for the re-release. It was to include five songs that were previously unreleased on CD, sixteen remixes, two soundtrack songs, one demo and the Spanish version of "Words Get in the Way".

== Track listing ==
All tracks are written by Lawrence Dermer, Joe Galdo, and Rafael Vigil, except where noted.

Side one
No.	Title	Writer(s)	Length
1.	"Body to Body"	Suzi Carr; Dermer; Galdo	3:56
2.	"Primitive Love"		4:42
3.	"Words Get in the Way"	Gloria M. Estefan	3:23
4.	"Bad Boy"		3:53
5.	"Falling in Love (Uh-Oh)"		3:58

Side two
No.	Title	Writer(s)	Length
6.	"Conga"	Enrique E. Garcia	4:11
7.	"Mucho Money"		4:44
8.	"You Made a Fool of Me"	Wesley B. Wright	2:54
9.	"Movies"		2:57
10.	"Surrender Paradise"	Carr; Dermer; Galdo	4:50
Total length:			39:24

Europe, U.K., South Africa and Japan CD bonus tracks
No.	Title	Writer(s)	Length
11.	"Conga" (dance mix)	Garcia	5:59
12.	"Bad Boy" (club mix)		6:24
13.	"Body to Body" (dance mix)	Carr; Dermer; Galdo	6:49
14.	"Primitive Love" (dance mix)		6:25

Japan Mini-LP CD Series Limited Edition bonus track (2009)
No.	Title	Length
15.	"Bad Boy" (Shep Pettibone Dub)	6:25

U.S. (Discos CBS International release) and Latin American track listing
No.	Title	Writer(s)	Length
1.	"Body to Body"	Carr; Dermer; Galdo	3:56
2.	"Primitive Love"		4:42
3.	"No Me Vuelvo a Enamorar" (Words Get in the Way) (Spanish version)	G. Estefan	3:23
4.	"Bad Boy"		3:53
5.	"Falling in Love (Uh-Oh)"		3:58
6.	"Conga"	Garcia	4:11
7.	"Mucho Money" (Spanish version)		4:44
8.	"You Made a Fool of Me"	Wright	2:54
9.	"Movies"		2:57
10.	"Hablas de Mí" (exclusive track)	Jorge Luis Piloto	3:40

=== 2017 Remastered Deluxe Version (unreleased) ===
Disc one bonus tracks
No.	Title	Writer(s)	Length
11.	"Hablas de Mi"	Piloto	3:05
12.	"Hot Summer Nights" (From Top Gun)	Michael Jay; Alan Roy Scott; Roy Freeland	3:34
13.	"Suave" (From Cobra)	Emilio Estefan	3:03
14.	"Body to Body" (extended dance edit)	Carr; Dermer; Galdo	4:48
15.	"Primitive Love" (extended dance edit)		5:09
16.	"No me Vuelvo a Enamorar"	G. Estefan	3:29
17.	"Bad Boy" (Shep Pettibone 7" remix)		3:42
18.	"Falling in Love (Uh-Oh)" (demo)		3:58
19.	"Mucho Money" (Spanish version)		4:44
20.	"Conga" (The Stronga Conga remix)	Garcia	4:24

Disc two
No.	Title	Writer(s)	Length
1.	"Conga" (Pablo Flores dance mix)	Garcia	6:00
2.	"Bad Boy" (Pablo Flores club mix)		6:26
3.	"Falling in Love (Uh-Oh)" (Pablo Flores extended mix)		6:07
4.	"Body to Body" (Extended dance mix)	Carr; Dermer; Galdo	6:47
5.	"Primitive Love" (Extended dance mix)		6:23
6.	"Bad Boy" (Rubber-Club dub mix)		6:18
7.	"Falling in Love (Uh-Oh)" (Pablo Flores 7" remix)		3:07
8.	"Bad Boy" (Shep Pettibone remix)		6:11
9.	"Conga" (instrumental)	Garcia	4:52
10.	"Bad Boy" (Shep Pettibone dub version)		6:43
11.	"Falling in Love (Uh-Oh)" (Pablo Flores dub version)		5:18
12.	"Bad Boy" (Extended dance mix)		6:22
13.	"Bad Boy" (Extended dub mix)		6:15

== Personnel ==
- Gloria Estefan – lead vocal, background vocals
- Emilio Estefan – percussions
- Enrique "Kiki" García – drums
- Juan Marcos Ávila – bass guitar
- Wesley B. Wright – guitar
- Roger Fisher – keyboards
- Gustavo Lezcano – harmonica
- Víctor López – trumpet
- Ed Calle – saxophone
- Tony Concepcion – trumpet
- Rafael Padilla – percussion, timbales
- Betty Cortez – keyboards, background vocals
- Rafael Vigil – background vocals
- Paquito Hechavarría – piano ("Conga")
- Juanito Márquez – guitar ("Conga")
- Suzi Carr – background vocal ("Body to Body")
- Emilio Estefan Jr. – producer
- Lawrence Dermer – arranger
- Joe Galdo – arranger
- Eric Schilliing – engineer, mixing
- Ted Stein – engineer
- John Haag – engineer
- Mark Richman – engineer
- Teresa Verplanck – assistant engineer
- Patrice Caroll Levinsohn – assistant engineer
- Carlos Santos – assistant engineer
- Juanito Márquez – horn arrangement ("Mucho Money", "Movies")
- Víctor López – horn arrangement ("Conga")
- Ricardo Eddy Martínez – horn arrangement ("Conga")
- Pablo Flores – remixes ("Bad Boy" Dub Version, 2009 Japan Mini-LP CD Edition, "Conga", "Primitive Love")
- Bob Rauchman – design and art direction
- Al Freedy – front cover photography
- Michael Wray – back cover photography
- Samy – hair and makeup
- Fini Lignarolo – front cover clothes

== Chart positions ==
=== Weekly charts ===
Chart (1985)	Peak position
Canada Top Albums/CDs (RPM)	19
Dutch Albums (Album Top 100)	30
German Albums (Offizielle Top 100)	41
New Zealand Albums (RMNZ)	13
US Billboard 200	21
US Latin Pop Albums (Billboard)	1

=== Year-end charts ===
Chart (1986)	Peak position
Canada Top Albums/CDs (RPM)	78
US Billboard 200	10

== Certifications ==
Region	Certification	Certified units/sales
Canada (Music Canada)	Platinum	100,000^{^}
Colombia	Gold	
Japan	—	42,640
United States (RIAA)	3× Platinum	3,000,000^{^}
^{^} Shipments figures based on certification alone.

== Release history ==
Region	Date
U.S.	August 13, 1985
Europe	August 12, 1985
Japan	August 23, 1985
Japan (Mini-LP CD Series)	July 8, 2009
Music on vinyl re-release	March 29, 2024

== See also ==
- List of Billboard Latin Pop Albums number ones from the 1980s
