= Magalenha =

Single by Carlinhos Brown

from the album Brasileiro
- Released: 1992
- Genre: Batucada
- Length: 3:37
- Label: Elektra Records
- Songwriter: Carlinhos Brown
- Producer: Carlinhos Brown/Sergio Mendes

"Magalenha" is a batucada style song by Brazilian musician Carlinhos Brown. It was written, sung and produced by Brown with Sergio Mendes serving as executive producer. It is the second track on his studio album, Brasileiro (1992). The single was later featured in the 1998 film Dance with Me and its soundtrack. Magalenha was later included on Brown's 2012 studio album Mixturada Brasileira. In 2020, Cuban-American singer Gloria Estefan covered Magalenha on her album, Brazil305, singing a duet with Brown as the featured vocalist. It was featured in the 2024 Volkswagen Atlas TV Spot.

== Track listing ==
7" - Spain

- A1. "Magalenha" - 3:37
- B1. "Magalenha" - 3:37

12" - Japan

- A1. "Magalenha" (Moto Blanco Main Remix) - 7:43
- A2. "Magalenha" (Moto Blanco Dub Remix) - 7:44
- A3. "Magalenha" (Album Version) - 3:56
- B1. "Emorio" (Paul Oakenfold Club Mix) - 4:58
- B2. "Maracatu Atômico" (Paul Oakenfold Club Mix) - 5:09

12" - United Kingdom

- A1. "Magalenha" (Moto Blanco Main Remix) - 7:43
- A2. "Magalenha" (Moto Blanco Dub Remix) - 7:44
- B1. "Magalenha" (Moto Blanco Radio Edit)

CD single - Bellini & Mendonça Do Rio remixes

1. "Magalenha" (Radio Mix) - 3:16
2. "Magalenha" (Extended Mix) - 6:04
3. "Magalenha" (Bongoloverz Mix) - 7:53
4. "Magalenha" (Original Edit) - 3:35

EP download digital - Mendonça Do Rio remixes

1. "Magalenha 2012" (Tiko's Groove Radio Edit) - 3:16
2. "Magalenha 2012" (Tiko's Groove Extended Mix) - 5:38
3. "Magalenha 2012" (Joe K Radio Edit) - 3:34
4. "Magalenha 2012" (Joe K Extended Mix) - 6:25

== Charts ==
=== Weekly charts ===
Chart (2004)	Peak position
Hungary (Dance Top 40) Bellini & Mendonça Do Rio remix	18
