= Eyes of Innocence (Miami Sound Machine album) =

Studio album by Miami Sound Machine
- Released: October 25, 1984
- Recorded: 1983–1984
- Genre: Dance-pop
- Length: 40:37
- Label: Epic; CBS Records International
- Producer: Emilio Estefan Jr.

Miami Sound Machine chronology
A Toda Máquina (1984)	Eyes of Innocence (1984)	Primitive Love (1985)

Singles from Eyes Of Innocence
- 1. "Dr. Beat" Released: June 1984; 2. "Prisoner of Love" Released: September 1984; 3. "I Need a Man" Released: November 1984; 4. "I Need Your Love (Philippines only)" Released: 1984

Professional ratings
Review scores
Source	Rating
AllMusic	2/5 stars

Eyes of Innocence is the eighth studio album and first fully English-language album released by the Miami Sound Machine in 1984.

== Background ==
Eyes of Innocence was the first release by the Miami Sound Machine outside of the Americas. It established breakthrough single success for the band with the lead single, "Dr. Beat", a top 20 hit in Australia, the United Kingdom and other places in Europe. It was the most successful cut from the album; the song utilizes synthesizers and dance rhythms of the time, but distinguished itself from other pop music of the era through the inclusion of Latin sounds.

The second single, "Prisoner of Love", was released exclusively to the European market. However, the song, which had a similar sound to the previous single, was a commercial failure, only reaching number #98 on the UK Singles Chart. Due to the failure of "Prisoner of Love", a different single was released to the American market, "I Need a Man", but it failed to enter any major charts. "I Need Your Love" was issued as a final promo single in the Philippines, again failing to impact any chart.

Many of the songs from the album were originally written in Spanish and translated into English, including "Orange Express", which was the title track of the band's previous album A Toda Máquina, and "I Need Your Love", a translation of the song "Regresa a Mí".

Although Eyes of Innocence did not chart in any country, it has sold more than one million copies worldwide.

== Track listing ==
All tracks are written by Enrique E. Garcia, except where noted.

Side one
No.	Title	Writer(s)	Length
1.	"Dr. Beat"		4:26
2.	"Prisoner of Love"		4:00
3.	"Ok"	Wesley B. Wright	4:12
4.	"Love Me"	Gloria M. Estefan	4:15
5.	"Orange Express"	S. Watanabe; Wesley B. Wright	3:45

Side two
No.	Title	Writer(s)	Length
6.	"I Need a Man"		3:40
7.	"Eyes of Innocence"	Gustavo Lezcano	3:04
8.	"When Someone Comes Into Your Life"	Estefan	4:59
9.	"I Need Your Love"		4:38
10.	"Do You Want to Dance?"		3:40
Total length:			40:37

2009 Japan Mini-LP CD Series bonus tracks
No.	Title	Length
11.	"I Need a Man" (instrumental version)	5:58
12.	"Dr. Beat" (long version)	6:26

== Personnel ==
=== Musicians ===
- Gloria Estefan – lead vocal, background vocals
- Emilio Estefan Jr. – percussion
- Enrique "Kiki" Garcia – drums
- Juan Marcos Avila – bass guitar
- Wesley B. Wright – guitar
- Roger Fisher – keyboards
- Gustavo Lezcano – harmonica
- Luis Perez – trombone
- Victor Lopez, Leo Villar – trumpet
- Betty Cortez – synthesizer
- Rubens Basini – guest musician
- Joe Galdo – guest musician
- Eddie Calle – guest musician
- Lawrence Dermer – guest musician
- Pablo Flores – guest musician
- John Morales – guest musician
- Sammy Vargas – guest musician

=== Production ===
- Emilio Estefan Jr. – producer
- Miami Sound Machine – arranger
- Hector Garrido – arranger
- Lou Pace – arranger
- William Sanchez – arranger
- Eric Schilling – engineer, mixing
- Joe Arlotta – engineer, mixing
- Ted Stein – assistant
- Sean Chambers – assistant
- Sebastian Krys – assistant
- Mark Krieg – assistant
- Andrew Roshberg – assistant
- Noel Harris – assistant
- Geoff Foster – assistant
- Lance Phillips – assistant
- Javier Vacas – assistant

=== Design ===
- Alex Sanchez – cover design
- Al Freddy – photography
- Samy – hair and makeup

== Certifications ==
Region	Certification	Certified units/sales
United States (RIAA)	Gold	500,000^{^}
^{^} Shipments figures based on certification alone.

== Release history ==
Country	Release date
U.S.	October 25, 1984
Europe & U.K.	October 1984
Japan	March 21, 1985
