= Bad Boy (Miami Sound Machine song) =

Single by Miami Sound Machine

from the album Primitive Love
- B-side: "Surrender Paradise" (North America); "Movies" (EU)
- Released: February 1986
- Recorded: 1985
- Genre: Dance-pop
- Length: 3:58
- Label: Epic
- Songwriters: Larry Dermer; Joe Galdo; Rafael Vigil
- Producer: Emilio Estefan Jr.

Miami Sound Machine singles chronology
"Conga" (1985)	"Bad Boy" (1986)	"Words Get in the Way" (1986)

Music videos
- "Bad Boy" on YouTube

"Bad Boy" is a song by the American band Miami Sound Machine, led by Cuban-American singer Gloria Estefan, and released as the second single from their second English language album, and ninth overall, Primitive Love (1985). The song enjoyed much success following up on the band's mainstream breakthrough single, "Conga". It also was featured in and opened the film Three Men and a Baby.

== Song history ==
The radio release and single was an edited and remixed version of the original album cut. It was remixed by Shep Pettibone. "Bad Boy" became the band's second top 10 single in the United States, peaking at number eight on the Billboard Hot 100, and reached the top 20 in many other countries around the world. The single was certified Gold by the RIAA in the US for sales of 500,000 units and by the ARIA in Australia for sales of 35,000 copies. The song landed at number 79 on Billboard magazine's year-end chart of 1986.

== Music videos ==
Two music videos were made for the song. One was made at the Fontainebleau Hotel in Miami Beach, in which Estefan plays a version of herself, trying to attract the attention of a Speedo-clad Hollywood star at the resort, whilst herself being pursued by a nerdy-looking fan. The other, directed by D.J. Webster, featured Estefan dancing with anthropomorphized alley cats, led by choreographer Russell Clark, in the style of the musical Cats.

== Formats and track listings ==
- US vinyl 12" single (49 05338)
1. "Bad Boy" (remix)
2. "Bad Boy" (dub version)
- US vinyl 12" promo single (PRO1)
1. "Bad Boy" (single remix)
2. "Bad Boy" (album version)
- US vinyl 7" single (34 05805)
1. "Bad Boy" (single remix)
2. "Surrender Paradise" (album version)
- UK vinyl 7" single (A 6537)
1. "Bad Boy" (single remix)
2. "Movies" (album version)
- UK vinyl 12" single (TA 6537)
1. "Bad Boy" (single remix)
2. "Bad Boy" (dub version)
3. "Movies" (album version)

== Release history ==
Region	Date
Europe	August 30, 1985
United States	February 15, 1986
Japan	April 2, 1986

== Charts and certifications ==
=== Weekly charts ===
Chart (1986)	Peak position
Australia (Kent Music Report)	55
Austria (Ö3 Austria Top 40)	8
Belgium (Ultratop 50 Flanders)	5
Canada Top Singles (RPM)	10
Europe (European Hot 100 Singles)	5
Finland (Suomen virallinen lista)	19
France (SNEP)	33
Ireland (IRMA)	23
Netherlands (Dutch Top 40)	2
Netherlands (Single Top 100)	5
New Zealand (Recorded Music NZ)	7
South Africa (Springbok Radio)	13
Switzerland (Schweizer Hitparade)	9
UK Singles (Official Charts)	16
US Billboard Hot 100	8
US Adult Contemporary (Billboard)	8
US Dance Club Songs (Billboard)	10
US Hot Dance Singles Sales (Billboard)	3
US Hot R&B/Hip-Hop Songs (Billboard)	74
West Germany (GfK)	6
Zimbabwe (ZIMA)	2

=== Year-end charts ===
Chart (1986)	Rank
Brazil	19
Canada Top Singles (RPM)	72
US	79

=== Sales and certifications ===
Region	Certification	Certified units/sales
Canada (Music Canada)	Gold	50,000^{^}
United States (RIAA)	Gold	500,000^{^}
^{^} Shipments figures based on certification alone.

== Official versions ==
Original versions

1. Album version — 3:58

Remixes

1. (Shep Pettibone) single remix — 3:42
2. (Shep Pettibone) remix — 6:11
3. (Shep Pettibone) dub version — 6:43
4. (Pablo Flores) club mix — 6:26
5. (Pablo Flores) rubber club-dub-mix — 6:18
6. (Eric Schilling) 1992 remix — 3:46
7. (Unreleased) extended dance mix — 6:22
8. (Unreleased) extended dub mix — 6:15
