= Oye Mi Canto (Hear My Voice) =

Single by Gloria Estefan

from the album Cuts Both Ways
- B-side: "Oye Mi Canto (Spanish version)"
- Released: September 4, 1989 (UK); March 1990 (US)
- Genre: Dance-pop; Latin; Salsa
- Length: 4:52 (album version); 4:55 (Spanish version)
- Label: Epic
- Songwriters: Gloria Estefan; Jorge Casas; Clay Ostwald
- Producers: Emilio Estefan Jr.; Jorge Casas; Clay Ostwald

Gloria Estefan singles chronology
"Here We Are" (1989)	"Oye Mi Canto (Hear My Voice)" (1989)	"Cuts Both Ways" (1990)

Music video
- "Oye Mi Canto (Hear My Voice)" on YouTube

"Oye Mi Canto (Hear My Voice)" is a song by Cuban-American singer-songwriter Gloria Estefan, released by Epic Records as a single from her debut solo album, Cuts Both Ways (1989). The song is co-written by Estefan with Jorge Casas and Clay Ostwald, who also produced the song with Estefan's husband Emilio Estefan Jr. It was the second single in the UK, released on September 4, 1989, and throughout Europe in September and October 1989. In the US, it was the fourth single from the album and was released in March 1990. "Oye Mi Canto (Hear My Voice)" became a top-10 hit in Ireland and the Netherlands and a top-20 hit in Belgium, Finland, Luxembourg and the UK. The accompanying music video was directed by Paula Walker.

== Composition and release ==
A Latin dance track, the song exemplified some of Estefan's musical roots, much like in the style of her earlier music with Miami Sound Machine, and is much in the style of "Conga" and "Rhythm Is Gonna Get You". Though the song was only a minor chart hit in the US, it was more successful internationally. Furthermore, Estefan obtained her first MTV Video Music Award for this song for the "International Viewer's Choice Awards" in 1990. The remixes of the song and short editions were created by Pablo Flores, who would go on to remix many other Gloria Estefan recordings, as well as Keith Cohen and David Morales.

== Critical reception ==
Bill Coleman from Billboard magazine wrote, "Pop diva appears primed for club acceptance once again with this undeniably catchy tune, which comes with not only the requisite house mixes, but also English and Spanish versions. Ernest Hardy from Cashbox commented, "Wherein little Gloria gets back in touch with her roots, then has them retouched so they’re palatable to the club crowd. There’s a Def 12", a House Mix, the 12” Pablo Mix and a Spanish version. Because Estefan has such a large following, this will do well regardless, but it has a forced feel to it, with all these mixes, none of which quite ring true."

Pan-European magazine Music & Media found that "a bouncy salsa feel and a tough dance beat combine to support Estefan's voice. Latin music has never been a big commercial proposition in Western Europe but songs like this could change all that." Pat Thomas from Number One named it the "most exciting cut" of the album, complimenting it as "stunning". A reviewer from People felt that the song "seems much looser and much closer to the group’s Latin origins". Mike Soutar from Smash Hits wrote that it's "choc-full of demented drum rhythms, carnival whistles and shrill trumpet parpings. It'll have people going "Arriba!" all over the shop and doing the rumba till they keel over, most probably."

== Retrospective response ==
AllMusic editor Jason Birchmeier remarked that the song is "club-ready" with its "big late-'80s synth-drum patterns", complimenting it as a "super" song. In 2012, Pip Ellwood-Hughes from Entertainment Focus featured "Oye Mi Canto" in their list of "Our Top 10 Gloria Estefan Singles", declaring it as an "uptempo party track". In a 2016 retrospective review, Pop Rescue described it as "a fantastic foot-tapping latin music song".

== Music video ==
The music video for "Oye Mi Canto (Hear My Voice)" was directed by Paula Walker. It was later made available on Estefan's official YouTube channel in 2009, and had generated more than 16 million views as of August 2025.

== Track listings ==
US 7" Vinyl Single (34 73269) [April 1990]
No.	Title	Writer(s)	Length
1.	"Oye Mi Canto (Hear My Voice)" (Radio Mix)	Gloria Estefan, Jorge Casas & Clay Ostwald	3:50
2.	"Oye Mi Canto" (Spanish Version - Edit)	Gloria Estefan, Jorge Casas & Clay Ostwald	4:08

== Charts ==
=== Weekly charts ===
Chart (1989–90)	Peak position
Belgium (Ultratop 50 Flanders)	13
Canada Top Singles (RPM)	50
Europe (Eurochart Hot 100)	40
Finland (Suomen virallinen lista)	17
Ireland (IRMA)	7
Italy Airplay (Music & Media)	3
Luxembourg (Radio Luxembourg)	13
Netherlands (Dutch Top 40)	8
Netherlands (Single Top 100)	9
Poland (Polish Singles Chart)	4
UK Singles (Official Charts)	16
US Billboard Hot 100	48
US Cash Box Top 100	45
US Adult Contemporary (Billboard)	31
US Hot Latin Songs (Billboard)	10
West Germany (GfK)	28
