= Words Get in the Way =

Single by Miami Sound Machine

from the album Primitive Love
- B-side: "Movies"
- Released: June 1986
- Recorded: 1985
- Genre: Pop
- Length: 3:30
- Label: Epic
- Songwriter: Gloria Estefan
- Producer: Emilio Estefan Jr.

Miami Sound Machine singles chronology
| "Bad Boy" (1986) | "Words Get in the Way" (1986) | "Falling in Love (Uh-Oh)" (1986) |

"Words Get in the Way" is a song written by Gloria Estefan and released as the third single from her band, Miami Sound Machine, on their second English language album, and ninth overall, Primitive Love. The song is a ballad and became the highest-charting song from the album in the United States.

== Song history ==
As a ballad, "Words Get in the Way" marked a change in sound from the band's earlier singles and foreshadowed Estefan's later success.

The song was their first to crack the Top 5 on the U.S. Billboard Hot 100, peaking at #5, and became their first number-one hit on Billboard's Adult Contemporary chart in 1986. They didn't achieve the same success internationally, but still managed to reach the Top 20 in other countries. The single was certified Gold by the ARIA for its sales of 35,000 copies.

The band re-recorded the song in Spanish under the title "No Me Vuelvo a Enamorar" ("I Won't Fall in Love Again"), although not a direct translation. The Spanish version entered the "Hot Latin Songs" in the Top 20, becoming the band's first entrance on the chart. This version was available on international pressings of the album and on its inclusion on Estefan's Spanish compilation Exitos de Gloria Estefan.

A live version with a different arrangement was included as a B-side to the single, "Always Tomorrow," and as a bonus track on international editions of Into the Light. It was taken from Estefan's Homecoming Concert in Miami from her 1988 Let it Loose Tour, released on VHS.

The song was featured in 1986 episodes of the daytime soap operas All My Children and Another World.

== Formats and track listings ==
U.S. and Canada 7" vinyl single (34 06120) [June 1986]
| No. | Title | Writer(s) | Length |
|---|---|---|---|
| 1. | "Words Get in the Way" | Gloria M. Estefan | 3:23 |
| 2. | "Movies" | Lawrence Dermer; Joe Galdo; Rafael Vigil | 2:57 |

U.S. promo 7" vinyl single (34 06120) [June 1986]
| No. | Title | Writer(s) | Length |
|---|---|---|---|
| 1. | "Words Get in the Way" | Gloria M. Estefan | 3:23 |
| 2. | "Words Get in the Way" | Gloria M. Estefan | 3:23 |

U.S. 7" vinyl single (Discos CBS International) [DBS 10120]
| No. | Title | Writer(s) | Length |
|---|---|---|---|
| 1. | "Words Get in the Way" | Gloria M. Estefan | 3:23 |
| 2. | "No Me Vuelvo a Enamorar" (Words Get in the Way – Spanish version) | Gloria M. Estefan | 3:23 |

Europe 7" vinyl single (EPC 650079 7) [October 1986]
| No. | Title | Writer(s) | Length |
|---|---|---|---|
| 1. | "Words Get in the Way" | Gloria M. Estefan | 3:23 |
| 2. | "Movies" | Lawrence Dermer; Joe Galdo; Rafael Vigil | 2:57 |

Europe 12" vinyl single (EPC 650079 6) [October 1986]
| No. | Title | Writer(s) | Length |
|---|---|---|---|
| 1. | "Words Get in the Way" | Gloria M. Estefan | 3:23 |
| 2. | "Movies" | Lawrence Dermer; Joe Galdo; Rafael Vigil | 2:57 |
| 3. | "Body to Body" | Suzi Carr; Lawrence Dermer; Joe Galdo | 3:56 |

Australia 7" vinyl single (ES 1169)
| No. | Title | Writer(s) | Length |
|---|---|---|---|
| 1. | "Words Get in the Way" | Gloria M. Estefan | 3:23 |
| 2. | "Movies" | Lawrence Dermer; Joe Galdo; Rafael Vigil | 2:57 |

New Zealand 7" vinyl single (ES 1158)
| No. | Title | Writer(s) | Length |
|---|---|---|---|
| 1. | "Words Get in the Way" | Gloria M. Estefan | 3:23 |
| 2. | "Movies" | Lawrence Dermer; Joe Galdo; Rafael Vigil | 2:57 |

South Africa 7" vinyl single (EN 5958)
| No. | Title | Writer(s) | Length |
|---|---|---|---|
| 1. | "Words Get in the Way" | Gloria M. Estefan | 3:23 |
| 2. | "Movies" | Lawrence Dermer; Joe Galdo; Rafael Vigil | 2:57 |

Zimbabwe 7" vinyl single (EN 5958)
| No. | Title | Writer(s) | Length |
|---|---|---|---|
| 1. | "Words Get in the Way" | Gloria M. Estefan | 3:23 |
| 2. | "Movies" | Lawrence Dermer; Joe Galdo; Rafael Vigil | 2:57 |

Philippines 7" vinyl single (ES-20089)
| No. | Title | Writer(s) | Length |
|---|---|---|---|
| 1. | "Words Get in the Way" | Gloria M. Estefan | 3:23 |
| 2. | "Orange Express" | S. Watanabe; Wesley B. Wright | 3:42 |

Japan 7" vinyl single (07•5P-421) [July 21, 1986]
| No. | Title | Writer(s) | Length |
|---|---|---|---|
| 1. | "Words Get in the Way" | Gloria M. Estefan | 3:23 |
| 2. | "Movies" | Lawrence Dermer; Joe Galdo; Rafael Vigil | 2:57 |

U.S. cassette single (Hall of Fame Series) [15T 69122] {1989}
| No. | Title | Writer(s) | Length |
|---|---|---|---|
| 1. | "Words Get in the Way" | Gloria M. Estefan | 3:23 |
| 2. | "Betcha Say That" (single remix) | Lawrence Dermer; Joe Galdo; Rafael Vigil | 3:40 |

U.S. 7" vinyl single (Hall of Fame Series) [15 69122] {1989}
| No. | Title | Writer(s) | Length |
|---|---|---|---|
| 1. | "Words Get in the Way" | Gloria M. Estefan | 3:23 |
| 2. | "Betcha Say That" (single remix) | Lawrence Dermer; Joe Galdo; Rafael Vigil | 3:40 |

U.S. 7" vinyl single (Epic Collectables) [15 69122] {1991}
| No. | Title | Writer(s) | Length |
|---|---|---|---|
| 1. | "Words Get in the Way" | Gloria M. Estefan | 3:23 |
| 2. | "Betcha Say That" (single remix) | Lawrence Dermer; Joe Galdo; Rafael Vigil | 3:40 |

Ecuador 7" vinyl single (133-0115)
| No. | Title | Writer(s) | Length |
|---|---|---|---|
| 1. | "No Me Vuelvo a Enamorar" (Words Get in the Way – Spanish version) | Gloria M. Estefan | 3:23 |
| 2. | "Conga" | Enrique E. Garcia | 4:11 |

== Official versions ==
Original versions

1. Album version — (3:23)
2. Spanish version ("No Me Vuelvo a Enamorar") — (3:23)
3. Live version (from the Homecoming Concert in Miami 1988) — (5:02)

== Release history ==
| Region | Date |
|---|---|
| U.S. | June 1986 |
| Europe | October 1986 |
| Japan | July 21, 1986 |

== Chart performance ==
=== Weekly charts ===
| Chart (1986) | Peak position |
|---|---|
| Australia (Kent Music Report) | 22 |
| Belgium (Ultratop 50 Flanders) | 30 |
| Canada Top Singles (RPM) | 8 |
| Netherlands (Single Top 100) | 26 |
| New Zealand (Recorded Music NZ) | 4 |
| US Billboard Hot 100 | 5 |
| US Adult Contemporary (Billboard) | 1 |
| US Hot Latin Songs (Billboard) | 17 |
| US Radio & Records CHR/Pop Airplay Chart | 9 |
| US Radio & Records Adult Contemporary Top 30 | 1 |

=== Year-end charts ===
| Chart (1986) | Peak position |
|---|---|
| Canada Top Singles (RPM) | 70 |
| US Top Pop Singles (Billboard) | 47 |
| US Radio & Records CHR/Pop Airplay Chart | 66 |
| Brazil | 14 |
| New Zealand | 40 |
