= Get on Your Feet =

- US CD promotional single cover

Single by Gloria Estefan

from the album Cuts Both Ways
- B-side: "Words Get in the Way" (Live from the Homecoming Concert)
- Released: September 19, 1989
- Genre: Pop; synth-funk; dance-pop
- Length: 3:39
- Label: Epic
- Songwriters: John DeFaria; Jorge Casas; Clay Ostwald
- Producers: Emilio Estefan, Jr.; Jorge Casas; Clay Ostwald

Gloria Estefan singles chronology
"Don't Wanna Lose You" (1989)	"Get on Your Feet" (1989)	"Here We Are" (1989)

Music video
- "Get on Your Feet" on YouTube

"Get on Your Feet" is a song by the Cuban-American singer-songwriter Gloria Estefan, taken from her solo debut studio album, Cuts Both Ways (1989). Written by John DeFaria, Jorge Casas, and Clay Ostwald, and produced by the later two along with Emilio Estefan, Jr., it was released on September 19, 1989, as the second single taken from the record by Epic Records. A song of encouragement, the dance-pop and synthfunk tune shows Estefan helping someone that has fallen on hard times and letting them know they'll make it through once they get on their feet.

Critics reviewed the song positively, praising its upbeat nature and Estefan's vocals. In the United States, "Get on Your Feet" just missed out on the top ten, peaking at number 11 on the Billboard Hot 100. It was a better success on the Adult Contemporary chart, where it hit number five, and also reached the top ten of the Cash Box Top 100. Internationally, it proved less successful, hitting the top ten only in Ireland. Estefan rerecorded the song for her 2020 album Brazil305. Despite its subpar success, the track has gained longevity over the years, being named Estefan's signature song and is also the name of her Broadway musical about her life.

== Background ==
When asked about the making of the song in a Songfacts interview, co-writer John DeFaria, part of Estefan's touring band at the time, said that it was written on the tour bus between concerts with Estefan and her band. DeFaria stated he really wanted something positive and a great song to perform live. Estefan herself also spoke of the song in regards to the Cuts Both Ways album saying, "We felt freer on this record. The Latin music is interwoven into our songs a lot more. One song, 'Get on Your Feet', is not Latin at all but has a Latin break in the middle."

== Composition ==
"Get on Your Feet" is written in the key of D major, according to the sheet music published by Universal Music Publishing Group on Musicnotes.com. It runs at a tempo of 116 beats per minute.

== Critical reception ==
"Get on Your Feet" received positive reception from music critics. AllMusic editor Jason Birchmeier said the song is "club-ready" with its "big late-'80s synth-drum patterns", declaring it as a "super" song. Maryann Scheufele from AXS wrote, "The words, "get up and make it happen...stand up and take some action ..." is a song for the ages, ...and the song inspires the spirit that lives on when you do something about your life. Gloria Estefan convinces you that the weight of inaction is lifted off your shoulders when you "get on your feet". Gloria Estefan sings and Miami Sound Machine plays we all can dance our way through life to this one." Bill Coleman from Billboard magazine named it "an unassuming up-tempo pop/dance track harking back to the singer's 'Conga' days." A reviewer from Entertainment Weekly noted that the song has "surge and hustle". Pan-European magazine Music & Media called it "another lightweight up-tempo tune. As Latin as ever and a guaranteed hit." Pop Rescue opined that the track "ups the tempo somewhat, as the title suggests, with a plodding bass and beat, with acoustic guitars strumming. Gloria bursts in with her confident pop vocals. The song is up-lifting, telling you to 'Get on your feet. get up and make it happen' and 'Stand up and take some action'." Dave Sholin from Gavin Report wrote favorably for the single saying Gloria and husband Emilio "have demonstrated perfection in the art of turning out the very best in pop/dance music infused with Latin rhythms."

== Official versions ==
Original versions

1. Album Version – 3:38
2. 2020 version (on Brazil305) – 3:25

John Haag Remixes

1. Special Mix – 5:38

Justin Strauss & Daniel Abraham Remixes

1. Pop Vocal – 6:07
2. House Vocal – 6:50
3. House Techno Dub – 5:30
4. Deep Bass Vocal – 5:29

== Track listings and formats ==
- US and Australian 7-inch and cassette single
1. "Get on Your Feet" – 3:37
2. "Words Get in the Way" (Live from the Homecoming Concert) – 5:03
- Australian 12-inch single
1. "Get on Your Feet" (Pop Vocal) – 6:07
2. "Get on Your Feet" (Special Mix) – 5:33
3. "Get on Your Feet" (House Vocal) – 6:50
4. "Get on Your Feet" (House Techno Dub) – 5:30
- Japanese mini-CD single
1. "Get on Your Feet" – 3:39
2. "Get on Your Feet" (Special Mix) – 5:39
- European mini-CD single
1. "Get on Your Feet" (7" Version) – 3:36
2. "Get on Your Feet" (Pop Vocal) – 6:11
3. "1-2-3" (Live) – 3:53
4. "Don't Wanna Lose You" (Portuguese) – 4:18
- European mini-CD single (1990)
1. "Get on Your Feet" – 3:37
2. "Get on Your Feet" (Pop Vocal) – 6:07
3. "Don't Let the Sun Go Down on Me" – 6:11
4. "Your Love Is Bad for Me" – 3:47
- European 12-inch single
1. "Get on Your Feet" (Pop Vocal) – 6:07
2. "Get on Your Feet" (Special Mix) – 5:38
3. "1-2-3" (Live) – 3:53
- UK 12-inch single
1. "Get on Your Feet" (House Vocal) – 6:50
2. "Get on Your Feet" (House Techno Dub) – 5:30
3. "Get on Your Feet" (Deep Bass Vocal) – 5:29

== Charts ==
=== Weekly charts ===
Weekly chart performance for "Get on Your Feet"
Chart (1989–1990)	Peak position
Australia (ARIA)	98
Belgium (Ultratop 50 Flanders)	35
Belgium (Ultratop 50 Wallonia)	21
Canada Top Singles (RPM)	16
Canada Adult Contemporary (RPM)	4
Canada Dance/Urban (RPM)	14
Europe (Eurochart Hot 100)	49
European Airplay (Music & Media)	22
Ireland (IRMA)	5
Luxembourg (Radio Luxembourg)	18
Netherlands (Dutch Top 40)	12
Netherlands (Single Top 100)	15
New Zealand (Recorded Music NZ)	47
UK Singles (Official Charts)	23
US Billboard Hot 100	11
US Adult Contemporary (Billboard)	5
US Dance Club Songs (Billboard)	20
US Dance Singles Sales (Billboard)	9
US Cash Box Top 100	9
US Adult Contemporary (Radio & Records)	3
US Contemporary Hit Radio (Radio & Records)	8
US Adult Contemporary (Gavin Report)	3
US Top 40 (Gavin Report)	8
West Germany (GfK)	46

=== Year-end charts ===
Year-end chart performance for "Get on Your Feet"
Chart (1989)	Position
US Adult Contemporary (Radio & Records)	54
US Adult Contemporary (Gavin Report)	39
US Top 40 (Gavin Report)	97

== Usage in media ==
The song was covered in Dora the Explorer Live!: Search for the City of Lost Toys and Dora the Explorer Live!: Dora's Pirate Adventure. This cover would be reused in the Dance Fiesta album.

In a widely circulated viral video "Steve Ballmer Going Crazy", former Microsoft CEO Steve Ballmer danced and screamed wildly to this song at the company's 25th anniversary event in 2000.

The song was covered by Fantasia Barrino on the third season of American Idol, during a Gloria Estefan-themed episode.

The song was included in several episodes in the fourth season of the NBC comedy Parks and Recreation.

The song was referenced in the sixth book of the Dungeon Crawler Carl series, The Eye of the Bedlam Bride, as the System AI's favorite song on the album.

== Release history ==
Region	Date
United States	September 19, 1989
Japan	October 19, 1989
United Kingdom	November 13, 1989
Netherlands	May 1990
Belgium	June 1990
