= Don't Wanna Lose You =

1989 single by Gloria Estefan

Single by Gloria Estefan

from the album Cuts Both Ways
- B-side: "Si Voy a Perderte"
- Released: June 21, 1989
- Genre: Pop
- Length: 4:12
- Label: Epic
- Songwriter: Gloria Estefan
- Producers: Emilio Estefan, Jr.; Jorge Casas; Clay Ostwald

Gloria Estefan singles chronology
"1-2-3" (1988)	"Don't Wanna Lose You" (1989)	"Get on Your Feet" (1989)

Music video
- "Don't Wanna Lose You" on YouTube

"Don't Wanna Lose You" is a song written and recorded by Cuban-American singer-songwriter Gloria Estefan. It was released on June 21, 1989, via Epic Records, as the lead single to her solo debut studio album, Cuts Both Ways (1989). It was her first single released without the Miami Sound Machine. It was produced by Estefan's husband Emilio Estefan, Jorge Casas, and Clay Ostwald.

The pop ballad became a major success for the singer, becoming her second number one hit on both the US Billboard Hot 100 and Cash Box Top 100, and reached top ten status in Belgium, Canada, Finland, Ireland, Luxembourg, the Netherlands, and the United Kingdom. "Don't Wanna Lose You" received a nomination for a Grammy Award in the category for Best Female Pop Vocal Performance.

== International versions ==
Estefan also recorded "Si Voy a Perderte", which is the Spanish version of this song (translated as "If I Am Going to Lose You"). "Si Voy a Perderte", also included on Cuts Both Ways, hit number one on the US Billboard Hot Latin Tracks chart.

"Se tenho que te perder" (also translated as "If I've Got to Lose You") is the Portuguese version of this song, and was released as a single in Brazil, and as a bonus track on international editions of Estefan's Into the Light album. The Portuguese version was less successful than the English original, which ended being the fourth most played song in Brazilian radio in 1989.

A rerecorded version of "Don't Wanna Lose You" was included in Estefan's 2020 album Brazil305.

== Critical reception ==
Bill Coleman from Billboard magazine wrote that the "emotive slow number" "I Don't Wanna Lose You" showcases the singer's "sensitive vocal." A reviewer from Entertainment Weekly felt it "croon along smoothly". Pan-European magazine Music & Media complimented the song as "a strong, melodic and well put together ballad that will undoubtedly do well." Jerry Smith from Music Week declared it as "another epic ballad, superbly sung and sure to see the Miami sound gain prominence this side of the Atlantic." Pat Thomas from Number One named it a "big ballad". William Shaw from Smash Hits viewed it as a "scarf-swaying ballad of gargantuan soppiness." He added, "It's rather simple, not over the top, and Gloria — who wrote the song — doesn't wreck it by going too excessively mad on the vocal front. Poignant, I think the word is."

== Retrospective response ==
In a 2019 retrospective review, Matthew Hocter from Albumism wrote, "If ever a solo debut was to make its mark, this one well and truly did and this was never more evident than on the album’s lead single 'Don’t Wanna Lose You'". AllMusic editor Jason Birchmeier praised the song as "super". Another editor, Jon O'Brien, complimented it as "beautiful". In 2014, Maryann Scheufele from AXS ranked it among Gloria Estefan's 10 Best Songs, adding that Estefan "inspires women to stand their ground and keep their love." In 2013, Pip Ellwood-Hughes from Entertainment Focus featured the song in their list of "Our Top 10 Gloria Estefan Singles", describing it as a "power ballad". In a 2016 review of the album, Pop Rescue found that "I Don't Wanna Lose You" sees Estefan "pitched against a wonderful synthscape and simple pop-rock beat. Occasional electric guitar chips in, but this is a song about giving Gloria enough space to sing her heartfelt lyrics over a somewhat minimal track."

== Song nominations ==
The song earned a Grammy Award nomination for Best Female Pop Vocal Performance but lost against Bonnie Raitt's "Nick of Time". Her live performance of the song at the 1990 Grammy Awards was released on the 1994 album Grammy's Greatest Moments Volume I. It also received an American Music Award for Favorite Pop/Rock Single but lost to Milli Vanilli's "Girl I'm Gonna Miss You".

== Charts ==
=== Weekly charts ===
Chart (1989–1990)	Peak position
Australia (ARIA)	40
Belgium (Ultratop 50 Flanders)	5
Canada Top Singles (RPM)	3
Canada Adult Contemporary (RPM)	1
Europe (Eurochart Hot 100)	16
European Airplay (Music & Media)	6
Finland (Suomen virallinen lista)	8
France (SNEP)	40
Ireland (IRMA)	2
Luxembourg (Radio Luxembourg)	4
Netherlands (Dutch Top 40)	3
Netherlands (Single Top 100)	5
New Zealand (Recorded Music NZ)	18
Sweden (Sverigetopplistan)	13
UK Singles (Official Charts)	6
UK (MRIB)	4
US Billboard Hot 100	1
US Adult Contemporary (Billboard)	2
US Hot Latin Songs (Billboard) "Si Voy a Perderte"	1
US Cash Box Top 100	1
US Adult Contemporary (Radio & Records)	1
US Contemporary Hit Radio (Radio & Records)	1
West Germany (GfK)	41

=== Year-end charts ===
Chart (1989)	Position
Belgium (Ultratop)	44
Canada Top Singles (RPM)	23
Europe (Eurochart Hot 100)	94
Netherlands (Dutch Top 40)	38
Netherlands (Single Top 100)	46
US Billboard Hot 100	14
US Adult Contemporary (Billboard)	7
US Cash Box Top 100	5
US Adult Contemporary (Radio & Records)	12
US Contemporary Hit Radio (Radio & Records)	7

== Certifications ==
Region	Certification	Certified units/sales
United States (RIAA)	Gold	500,000^{^}
^{^} Shipments figures based on certification alone.

== Formats and track listings ==
US and Canada Cassette single (34T 68959) [June 1989]
No.	Title	Writer(s)	Length
1.	"Don't Wanna Lose You"	Gloria Estefan	4:10
2.	"Si Voy A Perderte" (Don't Wanna Lose You - Spanish version)	Gloria Estefan	4:10

US and Canada 7" vinyl single (34 68959) [June 1989]
No.	Title	Writer(s)	Length
1.	"Don't Wanna Lose You"	Gloria Estefan	4:10
2.	"Si Voy A Perderte" (Don't Wanna Lose You - Spanish version)	Gloria Estefan	4:10

US promo CD single (ESK 1666) [June 1989]
No.	Title	Writer(s)	Length
1.	"Don't Wanna Lose You"	Gloria Estefan	4:10
2.	"Si Voy A Perderte" (Don't Wanna Lose You - Spanish version)	Gloria Estefan	4:10

Europe 7" vinyl single (655054 7) [July 1989]
No.	Title	Writer(s)	Length
1.	"Don't Wanna Lose You"	Gloria Estefan	4:10
2.	"Si Voy A Perderte" (Don't Wanna Lose You - Spanish version)	Gloria Estefan	4:10

Europe 12" vinyl single (655054 6) [July 1989]
No.	Title	Writer(s)	Length
1.	"Don't Wanna Lose You"	Gloria Estefan	4:10
2.	"Si Voy A Perderte" (Don't Wanna Lose You - Spanish version)	Gloria Estefan	4:10
3.	"Words Get in the Way" (Live from the Homecoming Concert)	Gloria Estefan	4:59

Europe 3" CD single (655128 1) [July 1989]
No.	Title	Writer(s)	Length
1.	"Don't Wanna Lose You"	Gloria Estefan	4:10
2.	"Si Voy A Perderte" (Don't Wanna Lose You - Spanish version)	Gloria Estefan	4:10

Europe 3" CD-Maxi single (655054 3) [July 1989]
No.	Title	Writer(s)	Length
1.	"Don't Wanna Lose You"	Gloria Estefan	4:10
2.	"Si Voy A Perderte" (Don't Wanna Lose You - Spanish version)	Gloria Estefan	4:10
3.	"Words Get in the Way" (Live from the Homecoming Concert)	Gloria Estefan	4:59

UK CD-Maxi single ("The Ballads Compact Disc") [655054 2] {July 1989}
No.	Title	Writer(s)	Length
1.	"Don't Wanna Lose You"	Gloria Estefan	4:10
2.	"Anything for You"	Gloria Estefan	3:44
3.	"Can't Stay Away from You"	Gloria Estefan	3:56
4.	"Words Get in the Way"	Gloria Estefan	3:28

UK Cassette single (655054 4) [July 1989]
No.	Title	Writer(s)	Length
1.	"Don't Wanna Lose You"	Gloria Estefan	4:10
2.	"Words Get in the Way" (Live from the Homecoming Concert)	Gloria Estefan	4:59

UK 7" vinyl single #1 (655054 0) [July 1989]
No.	Title	Writer(s)	Length
1.	"Don't Wanna Lose You"	Gloria Estefan	4:10
2.	"Words Get in the Way" (Live from the Homecoming Concert)	Gloria Estefan	4:59

UK 7" vinyl single #2 (Limited edition poster package) [655054 9] {July 1989}
No.	Title	Writer(s)	Length
1.	"Don't Wanna Lose You"	Gloria Estefan	4:10
2.	"Words Get in the Way" (Live from the Homecoming Concert)	Gloria Estefan	4:59

UK 12" vinyl single #1 ("The Ballads Twelve Inch") [655054 1] {July 1989}
No.	Title	Writer(s)	Length
1.	"Don't Wanna Lose You"	Gloria Estefan	4:10
2.	"Anything for You"	Gloria Estefan	3:44
3.	"Can't Stay Away from You"	Gloria Estefan	3:56
4.	"Words Get in the Way"	Gloria Estefan	3:28

UK 12" vinyl single #2 (655054 8) [July 1989]
No.	Title	Writer(s)	Length
1.	"Don't Wanna Lose You"	Gloria Estefan	4:10
2.	"Words Get in the Way" (Live from the Homecoming Concert)	Gloria Estefan	4:59
3.	"Say" (Remix)	Jon Secada, Bill Duncan	3:41
4.	"Si Voy A Perderte" (Don't Wanna Lose You – Spanish version)	Gloria Estefan	4:10

Spain promo 7" vinyl single (ARIE 2208)
No.	Title	Writer(s)	Length
1.	"Don't Wanna Lose You"	Gloria Estefan	4:10

Australia Cassette single (655054 4)
No.	Title	Writer(s)	Length
1.	"Don't Wanna Lose You"	Gloria Estefan	4:10
2.	"Si Voy A Perderte" (Don't Wanna Lose You – Spanish version)	Gloria Estefan	4:10

Australia 7" vinyl single (655054 7)
No.	Title	Writer(s)	Length
1.	"Don't Wanna Lose You"	Gloria Estefan	4:10
2.	"Si Voy A Perderte" (Don't Wanna Lose You – Spanish version)	Gloria Estefan	4:10

Australia 12" vinyl single (655054 6)
No.	Title	Writer(s)	Length
1.	"Don't Wanna Lose You"	Gloria Estefan	4:10
2.	"Si Voy A Perderte" (Don't Wanna Lose You – Spanish version)	Gloria Estefan	4:10
3.	"Words Get in the Way" (Live from the Homecoming Concert)	Gloria Estefan	4:59

Philippines 7" vinyl single (QEL45-20169)
No.	Title	Writer(s)	Length
1.	"Don't Wanna Lose You"	Gloria Estefan	4:10
2.	"Si Voy A Perderte" (Don't Wanna Lose You – Spanish version)	Gloria Estefan	4:10

Japan 3" CD single (10•8P-3068) [July 12, 1989]
No.	Title	Writer(s)	Length
1.	"Don't Wanna Lose You"	Gloria Estefan	4:10
2.	"Si Voy A Perderte" (Don't Wanna Lose You – Spanish version)	Gloria Estefan	4:10

Japan promo 7" vinyl single (QY•5P-90053) [June 12, 1989]
No.	Title	Writer(s)	Length
1.	"Don't Wanna Lose You"	Gloria Estefan	4:10
2.	"Si Voy A Perderte" (Don't Wanna Lose You – Spanish version)	Gloria Estefan	4:10

Brazil promo 12" vinyl single (52.161)
No.	Title	Writer(s)	Length
1.	"Don't Wanna Lose You"	Gloria Estefan	4:10
2.	"Don't Wanna Lose You"	Gloria Estefan	4:10

Si Voy A Perderte – Mexico promo 12" vinyl single (PRLP 95092)
No.	Title	Writer(s)	Length
1.	"Si Voy A Perderte" (Don't Wanna Lose You – Spanish version)	Gloria Estefan	4:10
2.	"Don't Wanna Lose You"	Gloria Estefan	4:10

Si Voy A Perderte – Ecuador promo 7" vinyl single (133-1158)
No.	Title	Writer(s)	Length
1.	"Si Voy A Perderte" (Don't Wanna Lose You – Spanish version)	Gloria Estefan	4:10
2.	"Oye mi Canto" (Spanish version)	Gloria Estefan	4:10

Si Voy A Perderte – Costa Rica promo 12" vinyl single (8655054)
No.	Title	Writer(s)	Length
1.	"Si Voy A Perderte" (Don't Wanna Lose You – Spanish version)	Gloria Estefan	4:10
2.	"Don't Wanna Lose You"	Gloria Estefan	4:10

Se Tenho Que Te Perder – Brazilian promo 12" vinyl single (52.168)
No.	Title	Writer(s)	Length
1.	"Se Tenho Que Te Perder" (Don't Wanna Lose You – Portuguese version)	Gloria Estefan & Aloysio Reis	4:10
2.	"Don't Wanna Lose You"	Gloria Estefan	4:10
3.	"Si Voy A Perderte" (Don't Wanna Lose You - Spanish version)	Gloria Estefan	4:10
4.	"Se Tenho Que Te Perder / Don't Wanna Lose You"	Gloria Estefan & Aloysio Reis	4:10
5.	"Se Tenho Que Te Perder / Si Voy A Perderte"	Gloria Estefan & Aloysio Reis	4:10
6.	"Don't Wanna Lose You / Si Voy A Perderte"	Gloria Estefan	4:10

== Release history ==
Region	Date
United States	June 21, 1989
Europe	July 3, 1989
United Kingdom	July 3, 1989
Japan	July 12, 1989

== Cover versions ==
It was covered by Glee's Amber Riley in "The Spanish Teacher" episode using some of the lyrics from the Spanish version of the song.

Il Divo, the vocal quartet of male singers; Swiss tenor Urs Buhler, Spanish baritone Carlos Marin, American tenor David Miller and French pop singer Sébastien Izambard, along with Colombian producer winner of multiple Grammy Latino Julio Reyes Copello, recorded the song for the album Amor & Pasión from Il Divo (2015).

== See also ==
- Hot 100 number-one hits of 1989 (United States)
- Number-one hits of 1989 (U.S. Hot Latin Tracks)
