= Dr. Beat =

1984 single by Miami Sound Machine

- Standard artwork

Single by Miami Sound Machine

from the album A Toda Máquina and Eyes of Innocence
- Released: June 1984
- Genre: Dance-pop
- Length: 4:26
- Label: Epic
- Songwriter: Enrique E. García
- Producer: Emilio Estefan

Miami Sound Machine singles chronology
"Comunicación" (1984)	"Dr. Beat" (1984)	"Prisoner of Love" (1984)

Music videos
- "Dr. Beat" on YouTube

"Dr. Beat" is the first international single released by the American band Miami Sound Machine, led by Cuban-American singer Gloria Estefan, on their first English language, but eighth overall, studio album, Eyes of Innocence. The song was written by the band's drummer Enrique "Kiki" García and was released worldwide in 1984, becoming a hit in several European countries and propelled the album to success.

== Song history ==
"Dr. Beat" was not quite as popular in the US as some of Miami Sound Machine's later singles, only peaking at number 17 on the Billboard Hot Dance Club Play chart and failing to enter the Hot 100. However, it became one of the group's biggest international hits, reaching the top 10 in Spain and peaking at number six in the United Kingdom.

The song has maintained popularity through inclusion on a number of 1980s retrospective albums. It also became popular again in 2005 when Scottish DJ and producer Mylo mashed the song up with his hit "Drop the Pressure" to create "Doctor Pressure", which became a hit single in its own right despite borrowing heavily from both the song and music video.

In 2024, the song's 2000 remix "Emergency 911" by Prezioso & Marvin went viral on social media, becoming popular on video-sharing platforms like TikTok and Instagram. It was remixed again in budots style by Dj Johnrey as "Emergency Budots" in 2024 which would spawn a viral TikTok dance trend that same year.

== Chart performance ==
Although "Dr. Beat" did not chart on the main US Hot 100, it saw success in various countries in Europe. The song entered the chart in the UK in the top 10, helped in large part by an appearance on Top of the Pops by the band, and then started to make debut on other European charts. The song was less popular in the United States in comparison to the other countries, but became a dance hit, peaking in the top 20 on the US Dance Club Play charts.

The song was certified Silver by the BPI in the United Kingdom for its sales of 200,000 copies and Gold by the ARIA in Australia for its sales of 35,000 units.

== Music video ==
At the beginning of the music video for the song, which was shot on location on the rooftop of the Bacardi Imports Tower where Enrique García and Emilio Estefan worked for a short time, Gloria Estefan is singing and dancing on the roof of a tall building, in front of frantic crowd. Estefan is calling for Dr. Beat, which is played by songwriter and drummer Enrique García, to help cure her from her desire to dance continuously. Dr. Beat takes her from the scene to the hospital, as Estefan performs a choreography on the way. In the hospital, Dr. Beat conducts some investigations and performs surgery on Estefan. In the end a boom box is removed from inside of Estefan where it was attached to a cord similar to an umbilical cord on a child and cut by Dr. Beat.

== Formats and track listings ==
These are the formats and track listings of major single releases of "Dr. Beat".

- US 12" vinyl maxi-single (49-05023)
1. "Dr. Beat" (long version)
2. "Dr. Beat" (instrumental version)
- US 7" vinyl single (34-04574)
1. "Dr. Beat" (album version)
2. "When Someone Comes Into Your Life" (album version)

== Official versions ==
Original versions

1. Album version – 4:26
2. Long version – 6:26
3. Instrumental version – 5:26
4. Hustlers Up-Town full length disco remix – 6:51

== Charts ==
=== Weekly charts ===
Chart (1984–1985)	Peak position
Australia (Kent Music Report)	11
Belgium (Ultratop 50 Flanders)	3
Europe (European Hot 100 Singles)	8
Finland (Suomen virallinen lista)	18
France (SNEP)	23
Ireland (IRMA)	16
Netherlands (Dutch Top 40)	3
Netherlands (Single Top 100)	6
New Zealand (Recorded Music NZ)	15
Peru (UPI)	9
South Africa (Springbok Radio)	9
Switzerland (Schweizer Hitparade)	5
UK Singles (OCC)	6
US Hot Dance Club Play (Billboard)	17
West Germany (GfK)	7

=== Year-end charts ===
Chart (1984)	Rank
Australia (Kent Music Report)	83
Belgium (Ultratop 50 Flanders)	28
Netherlands (Dutch Top 40)	42
Netherlands (Single Top 100)	58

== Certifications ==
Region	Certification	Certified units/sales
United Kingdom (BPI)	Gold	500,000^{^}
^{^} Shipments figures based on certification alone.
