= Desde Adentro =

Studio album by Gian Marco
- Released: July 22, 2008
- Recorded: 2008
- Genre: Latin pop, rock, ballad
- Length: 47:28
- Language: Spanish
- Label: Caracola Records
- Producer: Áureo Baqueiro

Gian Marco chronology
8 (2006)	Desde Adentro (2008)	En Vivo Desde El Lunario (2009)

Singles from Desde Adentro
- 1. "Todavía" Released: 2008; 2. "Hasta que vuelvas conmigo" Released: 2008; 3. "Hoy" Released: 2008; 4. "Canta Corazón" Released: 2009; 5. "Tu Fotografía" Released: 2009; 6. "Parte de este juego" Released: 2009

Desde Adentro (English: "From Inside") is the ninth studio album by Peruvian singer-songwriter Gian Marco released by Caracola Records on July 22, 2008. It was his first album released as an independent artist in over a decade. The album was recorded in an unplugged (acoustic) way in three different formats with Gian Marco releasing his own versions of songs that he composed for different artists.

== Commercial performance ==
The album peaked at number 14 on the album charts in Mexico where it sold 10,000 copies and was also certified triple platinum in Perú for selling over 30,000 copies. The album received two nominations at the 2008 Latin Grammy Awards. It is one of the best-selling album in Perú

== Track listing ==
All credits adapted from AllMusic.

No.	Title	Writer(s)	Length
1.	"Canta Corazón"	Gian Marco Zignago	3:55
2.	"Hasta que vuelvas conmigo"	Zignago	3:26
3.	"Hasta que la vida pase"	Zignago	3:11
4.	"Tu Fotografía"	Zignago	4:31
5.	"Mientras tanto"	Zignago	3:30
6.	"Tengo ganas"	Zignago	3:19
7.	"Me canse de ti"	Zignago	4:30
8.	"Parte de este juego"	Zignago	4:52
9.	"Sentirme vivo"	Zignago	3:24
10.	"Todavía"	Zignago	3:49
11.	"Hoy"	Zignago	4:37
12.	"Lamento"	Zignago	4:24

== Charts ==
Chart (2008)	Peak Position
Mexican Albums (AMPROFON)	14

== Certifications and sales ==
Region	Certification	Certified units/sales
Mexico (AMPROFON)	—	10,000
Perú (UNIMPRO)	3× Platinum	30,000

== Accolades ==
9th Latin Grammy Awards

Year	Nominee / work	Award	Result
2008	Desde Adentro	Best Male Pop Vocal Album	Nominated
2008	Todavía	Song of the Year	Nominated
