= En Vivo Desde El Lunario =

Live album by Gian Marco
- Released: 2009
- Recorded: January 29, 2009
- Genre: Latin pop, rock, ballad
- Length: 72:51
- Language: Spanish
- Label: Caracola Records

Gian Marco chronology
| Desde Adentro (2008) | En Vivo Desde El Lunario (2009) | En Tiempo Real (2010) |

Singles from En Vivo Desde El Lunario
- 1. "Lamento" Released: 2009; 2. "Se Me Olvidó" Released: 2009; 3. "Resucitar" Released: 2009

En Vivo Desde El Lunario is a live album by Peruvian singer-songwriter Gian Marco released by Caracola Records in 2009. It was the first live album of his career.

== Release and reception ==
The album was a recorded at the Lunario National Auditorium during Gian Marco's concert on January 29, 2009. The album was nominated for Best Long Form Music Video at the Latin Grammy Awards 2009.

== Promotion ==
The album was simultaneously released in Perú and Mexico. In Perú he set out week long promotional tours in Barranco, Trujillo, and Chiclayo.

== Track listing ==
All credits adapted from AllMusic.

| No. | Title | Length |
|---|---|---|
| 1. | "Vientos del sur" | 4:23 |
| 2. | "Hoy" | 4:31 |
| 3. | "Canta Corazón" | 3:56 |
| 4. | "Hasta Que La Vida Pase" | 3:19 |
| 5. | "Mientras tanto" | 3:30 |
| 6. | "Me canse de ti" | 4:35 |
| 7. | "Lamento" | 4:08 |
| 8. | "Se Me Olvidó" | 4:21 |
| 9. | "Gota de lluvia" | 4:45 |
| 10. | "Tu fotografía" | 4:35 |
| 11. | "Todavía" | 3:56 |
| 12. | "Hasta Que Vuelvas Conmigo" | 3:32 |
| 13. | "Quiero saber" | 5:18 |
| 14. | "Lejos de Ti" | 3:27 |
| 15. | "Retrato" | 3:51 |
| 16. | "Sin querer" | 4:39 |
| 17. | "Sentirme vivo" | 5:10 |

== Charts ==
| Chart (2008) | Peak Position |
|---|---|
| Mexican Albums (AMPROFON) | 51 |

== Accolades ==
10th Latin Grammy Awards

| Year | Nominee / work | Award | Result |
|---|---|---|---|
| 2009 | En Vivo Desde El Lunario | Best Long Form Music Video | Nominated |
