= Live & Unwrapped =

2003 concert tour by Gloria Estefan

- Concert by Gloria Estefan
- Promo poster for Estefan concert
- Associated album: Unwrapped
- Start date: October 10, 2003
- End date: October 19, 2003
- Legs: 1
- No. of shows: 7 in United States

Gloria Estefan concert chronology
- One Night Only At The Mandalay Bay (2001); Live & Unwrapped (2003); Live & Re-Wrapped Tour (2004)

The Live & Unwrapped is the fifth special concert by singer and songwriter Gloria Estefan, the tour was a special show made only to launch the album Unwrapped, the show was made at The Colosseum in Caesars Palace, Las Vegas.

The tour had seven non-consecutives days, including October 10, 11, 12, 16, 17, 18 and 19 in 2003.

The filming of the show was released on DVD in February 2004.

== Show history ==
This show became in the first public appearance by Estefan to promote herself for an album or to any other artistic work since her show in 2001 One Night Only At The Mandalay Bay, this show became on her fifth special concert-ever given.

The show has dancers, choreography, special effects and everything to make it into what is called a Vegas show.

The set list featured mostly new songs from the album, but a lot of Gloria's greatest hits were also included on the show, almost at least one song of every albums were included, however were four albums that weren't included on the show, those were Eyes Of Innocence, Abriendo Puertas, Gloria! and Alma Caribeña.

- From Primitive Love: "Conga" and "Words Get in the Way".
- From Let It Loose: "Rhythm Is Gonna Get You", "Can't Stay Away from You", 1-2-3" and "Anything for You".
- From Cuts Both Ways: "Get on Your Feet", "Here We Are", "Oye Mi Canto (Hear My Voice)" and "Don't Wanna Lose You".
- From Into the Light: "Live for Loving You".
- From Mi Tierra: "Mi Tierra" and "Con Los Años Que Me Quedan".
- From Hold Me, Thrill Me, Kiss Me: "Turn the Beat Around".
- From Destiny: "Reach" and "You'll Be Mine (Party Time)".
- From Unwrapped: "Wrapped", Hoy", "In the Meantime", "Te Amare", "I Wish You" and "Your Picture".

This same list would be used for Estefan's 2004 tour Live & Re-Wrapped Tour, but with some new songs including principally from the album gloria!.

== Set list ==
1. "Get on Your Feet"
2. "Turn the Beat Around"
3. "1-2-3"
4. "Here We Are"
5. "In the Meantime"
6. "Your Picture"
7. Medley:
  1. "Mi Tierra"
  2. "Oye Mi Canto (Hear My Voice)"
8. "Hoy" (Salsa Mix)
9. "Con Los Años Que Me Quedan"
10. "Wrapped"
11. "Te Amaré"
12. Ballad Medley:
  1. "Words Get in the Way"
  2. "Anything for You"
  3. "Can't Stay Away from You"
  4. "Don't Wanna Lose You"
  5. "Reach"
13. "Rhythm Is Gonna Get You"
14. "Conga"
15. "Live for Loving You"
16. "You'll Be Mine (Party Time)"
17. "I Wish You"
18. "Te Amaré" (Reprise)

== Tour dates ==
Date	City	Country	Venue
North America
October 10, 2003	Las Vegas	United States	The Colosseum at Caesars Palace
October 11, 2003	Las Vegas	United States	The Colosseum at Caesars Palace
October 12, 2003	Las Vegas	United States	The Colosseum at Caesars Palace
October 16, 2003	Las Vegas	United States	The Colosseum at Caesars Palace
October 17, 2003	Las Vegas	United States	The Colosseum at Caesars Palace
October 18, 2003	Las Vegas	United States	The Colosseum at Caesars Palace
October 19, 2003	Las Vegas	United States	The Colosseum at Caesars Palace

== Tour credits ==
=== Miami Sound Machine ===
- Randy Barlow - Musical Director / Trumpet / Keyboards
- Tommy Maestsu - Guitar / Vocals
- Peter Parente - Guitar
- Edwin Bonilla - Percussion
- Eduardo Rodriguez - Percussion
- Archie Pena - Percussion
- Olbin Burgos - Drums
- Jorge Casas - Bass
- Clay Ostwald - Assistant Musical Director / Keyboards
- Herman "Teddy" Mulet - Trumpet / Keyboards / Trombone
- Mike Scaglione - Sax / Flute / Clarinet / Accordion
- Tom Timko - Saxes / Clarinet
- Doug Michaels - Trumpet
- Donna Allen - Vocals
- Juan "Cheito" Quinonez - Vocals
- Rita Quintero - Vocals
- Yisel Duque - Vocals

=== Dancers ===
- Paul Benshoof
- Alex Estornel
- Reina Hidalgo
- Tyrone Jackson
- Desin Jevon
- Kira Morris
- Mike Morris
- Elizaneth Ramos
- Stephanie Spanski
- Christian Vinvent

=== Choreography ===
- Kenny Ortega - Live & Unwrapped Stage Show Director & Choreographer
