= Resucitar (song) =

Single by Gian Marco

from the album Resucitar
- Released: 2004
- Genre: Latin pop
- Length: 3:21
- Label: Sony Music Latin, Crescent Moon Records
- Songwriter: Gian Marco Zignago
- Producer: Emilio Estefan

Gian Marco singles chronology
" Más Allá De Los Sueños" (2004)	"Resucitar" (2004)	"Sin Querer" (2004)

Music video
- "Resucitar" on YouTube

"Resucitar" (English: "Resurrect") is a song by Peruvian singer-songwriter Gian Marco. It was released by Sony Music Latin and Crescent Moon Records in mid-2004 as the lead single from his seventh studio album of the same name.

== Release ==
After he released the theme song for the 2004 Copa América, Gian Marco released his seventh album with this song as the lead single. Gian Marco wrote the song for his wife of 10 years, Claudia Moro.

== Promotion ==
The song was released on radio stations throughout Latin America and the U.S. in 2004. Gian Marco then embarked on his Resucitar Tour 2004 in order to promote the song along with the follow-up single Lejos De Ti. Gian Marco has since then performed the song on every single one of his tours even performing the song in Asian countries like Japan.

== Reception ==
The song peaked at #25 on the Billboard Latin Pop Songs chart, becoming his highest performing song on that chart to date. This success earned Gian Marco his first Latin Grammy Award in 2005. The song also peaked at number nine Colombia and number three in Perú. The song stayed at that peak there for 3 weeks. The song became a good first single for the album following up his hits "Se Me Olvidó" and "Lamento" from his previous album A Tiempo.

== Music video ==
The music video starts with Gian Marco in an old warehouse singing the song while playing the piano. Then he is seen in a different part of the warehouse playing the guitar while surrounded by lights.

== Charts ==
Chart (2004)	Peak position
Colombia (ASINCOL)	9
Perú (UNIMPRO)	3
US Latin Pop Airplay (Billboard)	25
