= Mandarina (album) =

Studio album by Gian Marco
- Released: May 28, 2021
- Genre: Latin pop, rock, ballad, folklore, salsa
- Length: 35:48
- Language: Spanish
- Label: Enjoymusic
- Producer: Sebastian Krys

Gian Marco chronology
Intuición (2018)	Mandarina (2021)

Singles from Mandarina
- 1. "Empezar De Nuevo" Released: January 24, 2020; 2. "Prefiero Vivir Sin Ti" Released: October 2, 2020; 3. "No Va A Ser Fácil" Released: December 4, 2020; 4. "En Tu Maleta" Released: March 25, 2021; 5. "Mandarina" Released: May 27, 2021; 6. "Pasa" Released: July 28, 2021

Mandarina is the fourteenth studio album by Peruvian singer-songwriter Gian Marco released by Enjoymusic Plubishing on May 28, 2021, as his first release in 3 years. The album includes 11 tracks including collaborations with Argentinian artists Coti and Diego Torres as well as with Spanish singer Rozalén.

== Background and release ==
In an interview with Radio Ritmo Romantica, Gian Marco stated: "This album is the result of a lot of patience, serenity and learning. Each song has its reason, its history and its own color. I don't like to label the style of my music on the records, my songs are just that… songs. Grateful to be working with Sebastian Krys again as a producer. Thanks to him and all the musicians who participated in the recording, each song took on a life of its own. 'Mandarina' is the result of a work embraced by an incredible team to which I will always be grateful. I hope you enjoy". The album was created almost entirely during the days of confinement and contains ten songs that have been produced together with Sebastian Krys with whom Gian Marco forms a luxurious duo creating number ones such as "Te Mentiría", "Lamento", "Se Me Olvidó", and "Sentirme Vivo". When asked about the name of the album, Gian Marco stated: "It is something almost fortuitous. The album has a song titled 'Mandarina'. This song has a lot of joy, it even has an air of the folklore of my land and something very, very, very fun, entertaining, a quite happy song, but after looking for the title of the album, I find that there are certain similarities between the song and the album. There are songs of heartbreak, of love; there are sensations, and I think that when you open a mandarin you find different segments. It's kind of a mystery, you know, and I found that metaphor interesting." Gian Marco also stated that he did not plan on releasing a new album and instead was going to just release singles during 2020 but due to the COVID-19 pandemic his plans changed so he began working on the album properly while recording remotely with musicians in the United States and Perú.

== Promotion ==
A total of 5 songs were released as singles in order to promote the album including Empezar De Nuevo with also has a remix featuring Argentinian singer Diego Torres and Mandarina which has a music video starting Miss World 2004 winner Maju Mantilla. Gian Marco was a guest Radio Ritmo Romantica on May 31, 2021, where he spoke about the album, a few of the songs from the album played on the radio, and the first three fans to share and tag two friends on the Facebook live video would be the winners of a pack which included a CD copy of the album, a block of the album, and a 20-second personal greeting from Gian Marco. Gian Marco also appeared on the Peruvian television show Wantan Night where he did an episode long interview talking about the album.

== Track listing ==
All credits adapted from Tidal.

No.	Title	Writer(s)	Length
1.	"No Va A Ser Fácil"	Gian Marco Zignago	4:01
2.	"Mandarina"	Zignago	3:03
3.	"Pasa"	Zignago	3:00
4.	"Empezar De Nuevo"	Zignago	3:38
5.	"Prefiero Vivir Sin Ti"	Zignago	3:52
6.	"Asi Soy Yo" (featuring Coti)	Zignago	3:14
7.	"Espejismo"	Zignago	3:40
8.	"Quédate Hasta Que Amanezca" (featuring Rozalén)	Zignago	3:15
9.	"En Tu Maleta"	Zignago	2:35
10.	"Calma En Mi"	Zignago	2:36
11.	"Empezar De Nuevo (Remix)" (with Diego Torres)	Zignago	2:51

== Awards and nominations ==
The album received nomination for Hit of the Year at the Premios Luces 2020 for the song Prefiero Vivir Sin Ti and received 2 nominations at the Premios Luces in 2021.

Year	Awards Ceremony	Work	Category	Result
2020	Premios Luces	Prefiero Vivir Sin Ti	Hit of the Year	Nominated

Year	Awards Ceremony	Work	Category	Result
2021	Premios Luces	Mandarina	Album of the Year	Nominated
2021	Premios Luces	No Va A Ser Fácil	Hit of the Year	Nominated
