= Gloria Estefan albums discography =

Gloria Estefan discography
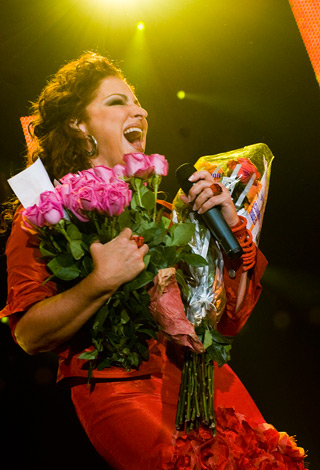
- Gloria Estefan receiving flowers for her 51st birthday at her show in the Ahoy Rotterdam, September 1, 2008
- Studio albums: 16
- Extended plays: 2
- Compilation albums: 11

The album discography of the Cuban-American singer Gloria Estefan consists of sixteen studio albums, fourteen compilations, and four EPs (not including Estefan's releases with her band, the Miami Sound Machine). Estefan' has sold more than 100 million albums sold worldwide which made her one of the most successful female Latin crossover artists. According to RIAA, Estefan has sold 28.5 million certified albums in the United States. Hailed as the reigning "Queen of Latin Pop", she has achieved 38 number one hits across all Billboard charts. Billboard listed her as the 23rd Greatest of all-time Latin artist.

Although they had been recording since the mid-1970s, Estefan's breakthrough came when Miami Sound Machine released the single "Dr. Beat" in Europe in 1984. Though a major hit there, the band did not make a commercial impact in the United States until the following year with the release of the single "Conga", which became a signature song for Estefan. Both of the corresponding albums (Eyes of Innocence and Primitive Love) were credited to Miami Sound Machine. Their next album, 1987's Let It Loose (titled as Anything for You in Europe) was credited to Gloria Estefan and Miami Sound Machine. All further albums from 1989's Cuts Both Ways onwards were credited solely to Estefan herself, though Miami Sound Machine continues to be her backing band and perform with her live to the present day.

Estefan has also recorded many albums in Spanish, and her 1993 album, Mi Tierra, is one of the most successful Spanish-language albums released in the United States. The album was also an international hit and became the first album in Spain to gain a Diamond certification (for sales in excess of 1 million copies).

== Gloria Estefan ==
=== Studio albums ===
Title	Album details	Peak chart positions										Certifications	Sales
Title	Album details	US	US Latin	AUS	CAN	FRA	GER	NLD	SPA	SWI	UK	Certifications	Sales
Cuts Both Ways	Released: July 1989; Label: Epic; Format: Vinyl, CD, cassette, MiniDisc	8	11	1	42	—	27	1	13	13	1	RIAA: 3× Platinum; ARIA: 3× Platinum; BPI: 3× Platinum; BVMI: Gold; GLF: Gold	
Into the Light	Released: January 1991; Label: Epic; Format: Vinyl, CD, cassette, MiniDisc	5	—	9	18	—	16	2	20	6	2	RIAA: 2× Platinum; ARIA: 2× Platinum; BPI: Platinum; MC: Platinum	US: 1,818,000
Mi Tierra	1st Spanish-language album; Released: June 1993; Label: Epic; Format: Vinyl, CD, cassette, MiniDisc	27	1	81	—	—	59	9	1	25	11	RIAA: 16× Platinum (Latin); RIAA: Platinum; PROMUSICAE: 10× Platinum (Diamond)	US: 1,209,000; SPA: 1,000,000
Christmas Through Your Eyes	First Christmas album; Released: September 1993; Label: Epic; Format: Vinyl, CD, cassette	43	—	140	—	—	—	—	—	—	—	RIAA: Platinum	US: 874,000
Hold Me, Thrill Me, Kiss Me	Released: October 1994; Label: Epic; Format: Vinyl, CD, cassette, MiniDisc	9	—	11	36	—	90	16	6	40	5	RIAA: 2× Platinum; ARIA: 2× Platinum; BPI: Platinum; MC: Platinum	US: 1,724,000
Abriendo Puertas	Released: September 1995; Label: Epic; Format: Vinyl, CD, cassette, MiniDisc	67	2	161	—	—	—	17	1	16	70	RIAA: 6× Platinum (Latin); RIAA: Gold	US: 437,000
Destiny	Released: June 1996; Label: Epic; Format: Vinyl, CD, cassette, MiniDisc	23	—	13	29	56	35	17	5	15	12	RIAA: Platinum; ARIA: Gold; BPI: Silver; MC: Gold	US: 879,000
Gloria!	Released: June 1998; Label: Epic; Format: Vinyl, CD, cassette, MiniDisc	23	—	65	65	56	34	47	1	12	16	RIAA: Gold; MC: Gold	US: 573,000
Alma Caribeña	Released: May 2000; Label: Epic; Format: CD, SACD, cassette, MiniDisc	50	1	—	—	41	18	24	1	9	44	RIAA: 4× Platinum (Latin); RIAA: Gold	US: 261,000
Unwrapped	Released: September 2003; Label: Epic; Format: CD, cassette, CD/DVD	39	—	—	—	126	26	27	4	2	76		US: 162,000
90 Millas	Released: September 2007; Label: Burgundy; Format: CD, CD/DVD, digital	25	1	—	—	106	46	1	3	4	—	PROMUSICAE: Gold	US: 150,000
Miss Little Havana	Released: September 2011; Label: Crescent Moon / Verve Forecast / Universal Music; Format: CD, digital	28	—	—	—	—	—	—	93	—	—		
The Standards	Released: September 2013; Label: Sony Music Latin, Sony Masterworks, Crescent Moon; Format: Vinyl, CD, digital	20	—	—	—	—	—	72	13	—	66		
Brazil305	Released: August 2020; Label: Sony Music Latin, Sony Masterworks, Crescent Moon; Format: Vinyl, CD, digital	—	—	—	—	—	—	—	24	47	—		
Estefan Family Christmas	Released: October 2022; Label: Crescent Moon, Sony Music Latin; Format: CD, digital	—	—	—	—	—	—	—	—	—	—		
Raíces	Released: May 29, 2025; Label: Crescent Moon, Sony Music Latin; Format: CD, digital	—	—	—	—	—	—	—	87	—	—		
"—" denotes releases that did not chart or were not released.

=== Compilations ===
Title	Album details	Peak chart positions										Certifications	Sales
Title	Album details	US	US Latin	AUS	CAN	FRA	GER	NLD	SPA	SWI	UK	Certifications	Sales
Éxitos de Gloria Estefan	First Spanish-language collection; Released: September 1990 (US) / October 1990 (International); Label: CBS Discos, Epic (Europe and Japan only); Format: Vinyl, CD, Cassette, MiniDisc	—	1	116	—	—	—	54	—	—	—		
Greatest Hits	1st English-language compilation album; Released: October/November 1992; Label: Epic; Format: Vinyl, CD, SACD, Cassette, MiniDisc	15	—	21	53	—	28	10	—	24	2	RIAA: 4× Platinum; ARIA: Gold; BPI: 3× Platinum; MC: Gold; NVPI: Platinum	US: 2,976,000
Best of Gloria Estefan	Released: February 1997 (France and Switzerland only); Reissued: February 1998; Label: Epic; Format: CD, Cassette	—	—	—	—	3	—	—	—	40	—		
Gloria Estefan: Greatest Hits Vol. II	Released: February 2001; Label: Epic; Format: CD, Cassette, MiniDisc	92	—	—	—	—	48	72	15	17	60		US: 154,000
Amor y Suerte: Exitos Romanticos	Released: October 2004; Label: Sony Discos, Epic (Japan only); Format: CD, CD/DVD (Spain only)	—	4	—	—	—	39	—	7	13	—	PROMUSICAE: Gold	
Oye Mi Canto!: Los Grandes Exitos	Released: October 2006; Label: Sony BMG Norte (US & Latin America), Epic, Legacy Recordings (Europe), Sony BMG Music Entertainment (Spain); Format: CD, CD/DVD (Spain only), digital	—	12	—	—	—	—	—	19	—	—		
The Very Best of Gloria Estefan	Released: October/November 2006; Label: Epic Records; Format: CD, CD/DVD (Japan only), digital	—	—	—	—	—	—	—	—	99	40	BPI: Gold	
The Essential Gloria Estefan	Released: October 2006; Label: Epic Records, Legacy Recordings; Format: 2-CD, digital	—	—	—	—	—	—	63	—	99	—		
iTunes Originals: Gloria Estefan	Released: May 29, 2007; Label: Sony Music; Format: Digital	—	—	—	—	—	—	—	—	—	—		
Playlist: The Very Best of Gloria Estefan	Released: March 31, 2009 (US), August 8, 2012 (Japan); Label: Epic Records, Legacy Recordings; Format: CD, digital (Europe only)	—	—	—	—	—	—	—	—	—	—		
Mis Favoritas: Gloria Estefan	Released: June 8, 2010 (US only); Label: Sony Music Latin; Format: CD	—	—	—	—	—	—	—	—	—	—		
Essential Gloria Estefan (Reader's Digest Edition)	Released: 2010 (UK only); Label: Sony Music; Format: 3-CD	—	—	—	—	—	—	—	—	—	—		
The Dutch Collection	Released: May 2013; Label: Sony Music; Format: 2-CD	—	—	—	—	—	—	86	—	—	—		
Soy Mujer	Released: June 23, 2015; Label: Sony Music Latin; Format: CD, digital download	—	—	—	—	—	—	—	—	—	—		
"—" denotes releases that did not chart or were not released.

=== Extended plays ===
Title	EP details	Notes
Twelve Inch Mixes	1st remix album (solo); Released: February 4, 1993 (UK only); Label: Epic; Format: CD	EP released only in Japan.
Bailando!	Released: 1998 (United States only); Label: Epic; Format: CD	A special EP sold only at Target stores across the United States for a limited time to promote the Gloria! album.
Partytime!	Released: 1998 (US only); Label: Epic; Format: CD	A special EP sold only at Target stores across the United States for a limited time to promote the Gloria! album.
Unwrapped: Remixes	Released: 2004 (US only); Label: Epic; Format: CD	This EP was not sold at stores; it was a bonus disc of the DVD of the tour Live & Unwrapped sold at the same tour.

== Miami Sound Machine (1977–1989) ==
Miami Sound Machine discography
- Studio albums: 11
- Extended plays: 2
- Live albums: 0
- Compilation albums: 1

This section includes the discography for the band Miami Sound Machine, led by Estefan and Emilio Estefan Jr.

The band formed in 1977 and released a total of eleven studio albums, one compilation and two remix EPs. The first seven studio albums released by the group were entirely in Spanish. Their first English-language release was their 1984 album, Eyes of Innocence, which featured the European hit "Dr. Beat". Success in the United States came the following year with the release of the single "Conga", taken from the album Primitive Love, which has since been certified Triple Platinum in the US.

By 1987, the group were credited as Gloria Estefan & Miami Sound Machine for the album Let It Loose (released in Europe as Anything for You). The album became the band's biggest seller, though no further releases were credited to Miami Sound Machine from 1991 onwards when Estefan effectively became a solo artist (though the band were credited on the inner cover of her 1989 album Cuts Both Ways before dropping their name in that same year). Since the 1990s, the members of Miami Sound Machine continue to be credited individually as session musicians on Estefan's albums, and they continue to be her backing band during live performances.

=== Studio albums ===
Title	Album details	Peak chart positions								Certifications (sales thresholds)
Title	Album details	US	US Latin	CAN	GER	NLD	NZ	SWE	UK	Certifications (sales thresholds)
Renacer / Live Again	First album of Miami Sound Machine (Spanish language); Released: 1977; Label: Audiofon; Format: Vinyl, cassette	—	— (Note: A national Latin albums chart was not published by Billboard until 1985; Renacer / Live Again reached number one on its intermittently published Miami Latin Pop albums chart.)	—	—	—	—	—	—	
Miami Sound Machine (Spanish Version)	Released: 1978; Label: Audiofon; Format: Vinyl, Cassette	—	—	—	—	—	—	—	—	
Miami Sound Machine (English Version)	Released: 1978; Label: Electric Cat; Format: Vinyl, Cassette	—	—	—	—	—	—	—	—	
Imported	Released: 1979; Label: CBS International; Format: Vinyl, Cassette	—	—	—	—	—	—	—	—	
MSM	Released: 1980; Label: CBS International; Format: Vinyl, Cassette	—	—	—	—	—	—	—	—	
Otra Vez	Released: November 9, 1981; Label: CBS International; Format: Vinyl, Cassette, Digital Download	—	—	—	—	—	—	—	—	
Rio	Released: October 1, 1982; Label: CBS International; Format: Vinyl, Cassette, Digital Download	—	—	—	—	—	—	—	—	
A Toda Maquina	Released: 1984; Label: CBS International; Format: Vinyl, Cassette	—	—	—	—	—	—	—	—	
Eyes of Innocence	First English-language studio album; Released: September 1984; Label: Epic; Format: Vinyl, CD, Cassette	—	—	—	—	—	—	—	—	RIAA: Gold
Primitive Love	Released: August 1985; Label: Epic; Format: Vinyl, CD, Cassette	21	1	19	—	30	13	41	—	RIAA: 3× Platinum; MC: Platinum
Let It Loose	Released: May 1987; Re-released in Europe in 1988/1989 as Anything for You; Label: Epic; Format: Vinyl, CD, Cassette, MiniDisc	6	—	29	57	1	18	29	1	RIAA: 4× Platinum; BPI: 4× Platinum; MC: Platinum
"—" denotes releases that did not chart or were not released.

=== Compilations ===
Title	Album details
Lo Mejor de Miami Sound Machine	First & only compilation credited to Miami Sound Machine; Released: 1983; Label: Epic; Format: LP, CD, Cassette
The Best Remixes	Released: April 21, 1989 (Japan only); Label: Epic/Sony, Epic International; Format: CD
Twelve Inch Mixes	Released: 1993; Label: Epic; Format: CD

== See also ==
- List of best-selling music artists
- List of best-selling Latin music artists
