= No Te Avisa =

Single by Gian Marco

from the album 8
- Released: May 3, 2006
- Genre: Latin pop; Latin rock
- Length: 4:06
- Songwriter: Gian Marco Zignago
- Producer: Kiko Cibrián

Gian Marco singles chronology
| "Gota De Lluvia" (2005) | "No Te Avisa" (2006) | "¿Qué Pasa?" (2006) |

Music video
- "No Te Avisa" on YouTube

"No Te Avisa" (English: "It Doesn't Warn You") is a song by Peruvian singer-songwriter Gian Marco. It was released by EMI and Caracola Records in 2006 as the lead single from his eighth studio album 8.

== Release ==
The song was only released as a single in Perú while ¿Qué Pasa? was released as the album's lead single in the rest of the world. Even though it was a difficult time for local artists to have their songs played on the radio, the song still had national success and was well received at the time of its release. The song was later released in radio stations in Colombia on October 3, 2006.

== Commercial performance ==
The song was a hit in Peru earning Gian Marco the Premios APDAYC award for Best Pop/Rock Song in 2007 and in the same category at the Premios Luces in 2008. Since he couldn't make it to the Premios APDAYC ceremony his mother, actress Regina Alcóver, received the award on his behalf.

== Live performances ==
Gian Marco performed the song several times during his concert tour as well as on tv shows like Magaly TeVe". Gian Marco also performed the song on the album's promotional first concert at the Jockey Club on June 2, 2006 alongside fellow Peruvian singer Juan Diego Flórez. In 2012 he performed the song alongside Mexican rock singer Álex Lora during a concert event which featured several guest artist to celebrate his 20 year career and promote his album 20 Años.

== Music video ==
The music video show Gian Marco in a big factory singing the song while his band is playing. Then the image changes to showing cupid shooting flaming arrows at people. The video was directed by the Peruvian director Percy Céspedez and was filmed on April 23 in an abandoned factory in Lima. The space was practically remodeled and reconditioned for the filming of the video, which took 20 hours of hard work. New faces were sought for the clip, as the singer is intended to reach a younger audience. The video of the song became available on all Peruvian channels and on the most important channels in Central and South America on May 4, 2006, one day after the song was released on the radio.

== Awards and nominations ==
| Year | Awards Ceremony | Category | Result |
|---|---|---|---|
| 2007 | Premios APDAYC | Best Pop/Rock Song | Won |
| 2008 | Premios Luces | Best Pop/Rock Song | Won |
