= 8 (Gian Marco album) =

Studio album by Gian Marco
- Released: November 17, 2006
- Recorded: 2006
- Genre: Latin pop, rock, ballad
- Length: 49:23
- Language: Spanish
- Label: EMI
- Producer: Kiko Cibrián

Gian Marco chronology
Resucitar (2004)	8 (2006)	Desde Adentro (2008)

Singles from 8
- 1. "No Te Avisa" Released: May 3, 2006; 2. "¿Qué Pasa?" Released: May 3, 2006; 3. "Quiero Saber" Released: 2007

8 is the eighth studio album by Peruvian singer-songwriter Gian Marco released by EMI on November 17, 2006. It was his first album released under his new label. Three singles were released in order to promote the album with the song No Te Avisa leading the album to a great start by earning Gian Marco multiple awards.

== Commercial performance ==
The album had success in some parts of Latin America but mainly in Perú where it was quickly certified Platinum for 10,000 copies sold. The album got Gian Marco two nominations at the Premios APDAYC in 2007 for Best Pop/Rock Artist of the Year and Best Pop/Rock Song for "No Te Avisa" winning the latter which since he couldn't make it to the ceremony his mother, actress Regina Alcóver, received on his behalf. "No Te Avisa" also won the Premios Luces award for Best Pop/Rock Song in 2008.

== Track listing ==
All credits adapted from AllMusic.

No.	Title	Writer(s)	Length
1.	"El Amor Es Un Juego"	Gian Marco Zignago	3:15
2.	"Dibújame El Camino"	Zignago	3:45
3.	"Cuando Tú No Estas"	Zignago	3:32
4.	"Quiero Saber"	Zignago	3:23
5.	"Sin Permiso"	Zignago	3:41
6.	"¿Qué Pasa?"	Zignago	3:29
7.	"No Te Avisa"	Zignago	4:06
8.	"Loco"	Zignago	3:19
9.	"Nunca Màs Te Vi"	Zignago	3:12
10.	"Vientos Del Sur"	Zignago	4:08

== Certifications and Sales ==
Region	Certification	Certified units/sales
Perú (UNIMPRO)	2× Platinum	20,000^

== Awards and nominations ==
Premios APDAYC

Year	Nominee/Work	Category	Result
2007	Himself	Best Pop/Rock Artist of the Year	Nominated
2007	No Te Avisa	Best Pop/Rock Song	Won

Premios Luces

Year	Nominee/Work	Category	Result
2008	No Te Avisa	Best Pop/Rock Song	Won
