= En Tiempo Real =

Live album by Gian Marco
- Released: December 10, 2010
- Recorded: October 22, 2010
- Genre: Latin pop, rock, ballad
- Language: Spanish, Quechua
- Label: 11 y 6 Discos

Gian Marco chronology
| En Vivo Desde El Lunario (2009) | En Tiempo Real (2010) | Días Nuevos (2011) |

En Tiempo Real is a live album by Peruvian singer-songwriter Gian Marco released by 11 y 6 Discos in 2010. It was the second live album of his career and first one to be released in DVD format.

== Background and Release ==
The album was a recorded during a special concert Gian Marco gave to his fans on October 22, 2010. The album was well received by the public and critics praising it for its acoustic live music with no breaks or sound effects as well as for the way that Gian Marco was demonstrating his abilities with a Peruvian instrument such as a charango. The concert was recorded in high definition. The album was quickly certified gold in Perú.

== Commercial performance ==
The album was a success in Perú where it was certified gold after just 2 weeks of its release and eventually certifying platinum. It was released on December 10, 2010 and by the beginning of 2011 it had already sold 5,680 copies earning its gold certification and just 2 weeks later it earned a platinum certification once the album sales reached 10,000 copies.

== Tour ==
Gian Marco embarked on the En Tiempo Real Tour in order to promote the album which started in Latin America and continued onto the United States. The U.S. leg began in Miami and continued onto New Jersey, Houston, and Seattle.

== Track listing ==
| No. | Title | Writer(s) | Length |
|---|---|---|---|
| 1. | "Dime donde" | Gian Marco Zignago |
| 2. | "Ando por la vida" | Zignago |
| 3. | "Amores imperfectos" | Zignago |
| 4. | "De Paseo" | Zignago |
| 5. | "Desde hace un mes" | Zignago |
| 6. | "En venta" | Zignago |
| 7. | "Expresso 2222" | Zignago |
| 8. | "Ojos azules/ adiós pueblo de Ayacucho/ valicha" | Zignago |
| 9. | "Roxanne" | Zignago |
| 10. | "Imagina" | Zignago |
| 11. | "Sentirme Vivo" | Zignago |

== Certifications and sales ==
| Region | Certification | Certified units/sales |
|---|---|---|
| Perú (UNIMPRO) | Platinum | 10,000 |
