= Intuición =

Studio album by Gian Marco
- Released: October 5, 2018
- Genre: Latin pop, rock, ballad, bachata, salsa
- Length: 39:25
- Language: Spanish
- Label: Enjoymusic

Gian Marco chronology
| #Libre (2015) | Intuición (2018) | Mandarina (2021) |

Singles from Intuición
- 1. "Bésame" Released: June 18, 2018; 2. "Tú No Te Imaginas" Released: September 15, 2018; 3. "Sácala a Bailar" Released: January 18, 2019; 4. "Nadie Mas Que Tú" Released: March 15, 2019; 5. "Me Gusta Mi Soledad" Released: March 29, 2019; 6. "Empecemos a Vivir" Released: July 11, 2019; 7. "Lo Que Nunca Fui Con Nadie" Released: September 27, 2019; 8. "Más De Lo Que Yo Te Quiero" Released: October 24, 2019

Intuición is the thirteenth studio album by Peruvian singer-songwriter Gian Marco released by Enjoymusic Plubishing on October 5, 2018. It was his first album release in 3 years and the last one he released in the 2010s decade.

== Promotion ==
A total of 8 songs were released as singles in order to promote the album including a new version of the song Empecemos A Vivir featuring Mexican singer Carlos Rivera. 7 out of 8 singles also had music videos uploaded to Gian Marco's YouTube channel with the video for "Me Gusta Mi Soledad" being shot in a single take for an acoustic version of the song. Gian Marco also appeared on several television shows throughout Latin America to promote the album starting with a performance of the first single on the show Un Nuevo Día. In 2019 he embarked on his "Intuición Tour" throughout the American continent to promote the album.

== Commercial performance ==
The album had great success throughout Latin America and was certified triple platinum in Perú. The album received a nomination for Best Singer-Songwriter Album at the 2019 Latin Grammy Awards. It is the best-selling album in Perú

== Track listing ==
| No. | Title | Writer(s) | Length |
|---|---|---|---|
| 1. | "Más De Lo Que Yo Te Quiero" | Gian Marco Zignago | 4:08 |
| 2. | "Tú No Te Imaginas" | Zignago | 3:27 |
| 3. | "Me Gusta Mi Soledad" | Zignago | 3:26 |
| 4. | "Bésame" | Zignago | 3:43 |
| 5. | "Lo Que Nunca Fui Con Nadie" | Zignago | 3:43 |
| 6. | "Nadie Mas Que Tú" | Zignago | 3:43 |
| 7. | "Sácala a Bailar" | Zignago | 3:46 |
| 8. | "Empecemos a Vivir" | Zignago | 3:24 |
| 9. | "Nada Cambia" | Zignago | 4:14 |
| 10. | "Cómo Decirte Que No" | Zignago | 2:24 |
| 11. | "Tú No Te Imaginas (Bachata Version)" | Zignago | 3:27 |

== Certifications and sales ==
| Region | Certification | Certified units/sales |
|---|---|---|
| Perú (UNIMPRO) | 3× Platinum | 100,000 |

== Accolades ==
20th Latin Grammy Awards

| Year | Nominee / work | Award | Result |
|---|---|---|---|
| 2019 | Intuición | Best Singer-Songwriter Album | Nominated |
