= Te Mentiría =

2003 song by Gian Marco

Single by Gian Marco

from the album A Tiempo
- Released: 2003
- Genre: Latin Pop
- Length: 3:49
- Label: Sony Music Latin, Crescent Moon Records
- Songwriter: Gian Marco Zignago
- Producer: Emilio Estefan

Gian Marco singles chronology
"Se Me Olvidó" (2002)	"Te Mentiría" (2003)	"Lamento" (2003)

Music video
- "Te Mentiría" on YouTube

"Te Mentiría" (English: "I'd Lie to You") is a song by Peruvian singer-songwriter Gian Marco, released by Sony Music Latin and Crescent Moon Records in 2003 as the second single of his sixth studio album A Tiempo.

== Background ==
The song is a Latin pop song with touches of traditional Peruvian music and it's defined as a song to help you forget about your ex and get over a heartbreak. Since its release it has become a major hit in Gian Marco's career and it's considered one of his signature songs.

== Release and Reception ==
The song was released on radio stations throughout Latin America and the U.S. in 2003, becoming one of Gian Marco's biggest hits. The song entered the top 10 in Colombia on the week of July 4, 2003. The song stayed in the top 10 for three non-consecutive weeks and peaked at number five. The song also reached number 27 on the Los Principales radio airplay chart in Spain on the week of February 15, 2003. It has become one of Gian Marco's most acclaimed songs and he performs it in every one of his concerts since then, sometimes even to close the show. The song is also a big hit in Perú up to this day still being on the official digital charts published by UNIMPRO.

== Music video ==
The music video starts with Gian Marco walking out of his house into an alley in a small village in Peru. He then starts playing the song on his guitar while singing in front of a small orange background. The scene changes back between him singing in an old restaurant and also in another part of the alley while playing the cajon. As he sings a big crowd eventually gathers around him to hear him singing.

== Charts ==
Chart (2003)	Peak position
Colombia (ASINCOL)	5

Chart (2021)	Peak position
Perú Digital Top 1000 (UNIMPRO)	423
