= I Wish You =

Single by Gloria Estefan

from the album Unwrapped
- Released: 2003
- Genre: Pop
- Length: 3:52
- Label: Epic
- Songwriter(s): Gloria M. Estefan, John Falcone, Sebastian Krys

Gloria Estefan singles chronology
"Wrapped/Hoy" (2003)	"I Wish You" (2003)	"Te Amaré" (2004)

"I Wish You" is the third single released by Gloria Estefan from her tenth studio album Unwrapped. In 2003, promotional CD singles were sent to radio stations in the U.S. In 2004, the song was released as a CD single in Europe.

== Meaning ==
Estefan said, "'I Wish You' is a power-ballad that shoots directly for the heart, pulling no punches. Telling someone that you love them, and wish them the best, even when they have wronged you, is often harder than when they have not. The concept, underscored beautifully, with sublime production, is a wistful goodbye that manages to empower the person who is being hurt the most."

== Chart performance ==
Country	Peak position	Weeks on chart
U.S. Billboard Hot Adult Contemporary Tracks	18	12 (April 24 - July 17, 2004)
Hungary (Rádiós Top 40)	28	
Switzerland	64	3 (February 22 - March 7, 2004)

== Official versions ==
Original versions

1. Album Version — 3:52

Remixes

1. DJ Joey Se' Revelation Anthem Radio Mix — 4:18
2. DJ Joey Se' Revelation Anthem Mix — 10:26
3. DJ Joey Se' Love Dub — 9:00

+The remixes for "I Wish You" were all commissioned to DJ Joey Se' but only the "Anthem Radio Mix" was released; it was issued on the EP Unwrapped: Remixes, aka "Sell Thru PPV (Bonus CD)" catalog #ESK-58488.
