= Resucitar =

Studio album by Gian Marco
- Released: July 20, 2004
- Recorded: 2003–2004
- Genre: Latin pop, ballad
- Length: 45:03
- Language: Spanish
- Label: Sony Music Latin, Crescent Moon Records
- Producer: Emilio Estefan

Gian Marco chronology
A Tiempo (2002)	Resucitar (2004)	8 (2006)

Singles from Resucitar
- 1. "Resucitar" Released: 2004; 2. "Sin Querer" Released: 2004; 3. "Después De Mí" Released: 2004; 4. "Lejos De Ti" Released: 2004; 5. "Gota De Lluvia" Released: 2005

Resucitar (English: "Resurrect") is the seventh studio album by Peruvian singer-songwriter Gian Marco released by Sony Music Latin and Crescent Moon Records on July 20, 2004. It was his second album to be released internationally. It was his last album under a major music label and since then he's been successful as an independent artist.

== Commercial performance ==
Like Gian Marco's previous album, this album was a success throughout Latin America and parts of Europe. Its lead single of the same name entered the U.S. billboard charts and the album earned Gian Marco his first Latin Grammy Award in 2005. This was Gian Marco's fifth nomination at the Latin Grammys.

== Critical reception ==
Professional ratings
Review scores
Source	Rating
AllMusic	3.5/5 stars

Besides getting good acceptance from the public and the recording academy, the album also received a 3.5 rating on AllMusic

== Tour ==
In order to promote the album, Gian Marco embarked on his Resucitar Tour 2004 throughout the American continent where the album's singles were having airplay success.

== Track listing ==
All credits adapted from AllMusic.

No.	Title	Writer(s)	Length
1.	"Gota De Lluvia"	Gian Marco Zignago	4:10
2.	"Después De Mí"	Zignago	3:35
3.	"Resucitar"	Zignago	3:21
4.	"Sortearme En Tu Suerte"	Zignago	4:45
5.	"Sin Querer"	Zignago	3:45
6.	"Flor De Arena"	Zignago	3:37
7.	"Si Me Vuelvo A Enamorar"	Zignago	3:54
8.	"Lejos De Ti"	Zignago	3:04
9.	"En Cada Recuerdo"	Zignago	3:34
10.	"Soy"	Zignago	3:42
11.	"Ayer"	Zignago	3:52
12.	"Tú y Yo"	Zignago	3:44

== Accolades ==
6th Latin Grammy Awards

Year	Nominee / work	Award	Result
2005	Resucitar	Best Singer-Songwriter Album	Won

Premios Luces El Comercio

Year	Nominee / work	Award	Result
2005	Resucitar	Best Pop Album	Nominated
2005	Himself	Best Pop Artist	Nominated
