= A Tiempo (Gian Marco album) =

Studio album by Gian Marco
- Released: December 2001 (Perú) April 9, 2002 (Internationally)
- Recorded: 2000
- Genres: Latin pop, ballad
- Length: 50:41
- Language: Spanish
- Labels: Sony Music Latin, Crescent Moon Records
- Producer: Emilio Estefan

Gian Marco chronology
Al Quinto Día (1997)	A Tiempo (2001)	Resucitar (2004)

Singles from A Tiempo
- 1. "Se Me Olvidó" Released: March 23, 2002; 2. "Te Mentiría" Released: 2003; 3. "Lamento" Released: 2003; 4. "Sentirme Vivo" Released: 2003; 5. "Al Otro Lado De La Luna" Released: 2003

A Tiempo (English: "On Time") is the sixth studio album by Peruvian singer-songwriter Gian Marco released by Sony Music Latin and Crescent Moon Records in December 2001 in Perú and April 9, 2002, for the rest of the world. It was his first album to be released internationally.

Gian Marco earned his first 3 Latin Grammy nominations with this album.

== Commercial performance ==
The album was a success throughout Latin America and parts of Europe. In Spain the songs "Se Me Olvidó", "Te Mentiría", and "Lamento" entered the Los Principales radio airplay chart peaking at number 6, 27, and 38 respectively. Se Me Olvidó was the most successful in Spain peaking at number 4 in the official Spanish charts. It launched Gian Marco's career Internationally and in that same year he was nominated for three Latin Grammy Awards including Record of the Year and Best New Artist.

== Reception ==
The album was praised by critics, receiving three Latin Grammy Nominations, as well by other big names in the music industry such as Marc Anthony, Emilio Estefan, Jaci Velasquez, and Emmanuel.

== Track listing ==
All credits adapted from AllMusic.

No.	Title	Writer(s)	Length
1.	"Se Me Olvidó"	Gian Marco Zignago	4:13
2.	"Al Otro Lado De La Luna"	Zignago	4:12
3.	"Su Encanto En Mi"	Zignago	4:03
4.	"Te Mentiría"	Zignago	3:49
5.	"Por Ti"	Zignago	4:20
6.	"Lamento"	Zignago	3:58
7.	"Simplemente Espiritual"	Zignago	4:04
8.	"No Logro Emtender"	Zignago	3:45
9.	"Retrato"	Zignago	3:37
10.	"Mujer"	Zignago	3:58
11.	"Ave María"	Zignago	3:58
12.	"Volveré"	Zignago	4:07
13.	"Sentirme Vivo"	Zignago	2:37

== Certifications and Sales ==
Region	Certification	Certified units/sales
Perú (UNIMPRO)	Platinum	15,000

== Accolades ==
3rd Latin Grammy Awards

Year	Nominee / work	Award	Result
2002	Himself	Best New Artist	Nominated
2002	A Tiempo	Best Male Pop Vocal Album	Nominated
2002	"Se Me Olvidó"	Record of the Year	Nominated
