= Bésame (Gian Marco song) =

Single by Gian Marco

from the album Intuición
- Released: June 18, 2018
- Genre: Latin Pop
- Length: 3:43
- Label: Enjoymusic
- Songwriter: Gian Marco Zignago

Gian Marco singles chronology
"Siete Semillas" (2016)	"Bésame" (2018)	"Tú No Te Imaginas" (2018)

Music video
- "Bésame" on YouTube

"Bésame" (English: "Kiss Me") is a song by Peruvian singer-songwriter Gian Marco released by Enjoymusic as the lead single of his thirteenth studio album Intuición.

== Background and release ==
Gian Marco stated that the song was born when he was alone playing his charango which he states he always has with him because he feels the need to include something from his homeland. The song was released on June 18, 2018 on all digital platforms. A lyric video for the song was released on the same day on Gian Marco's official YouTube channel. The song topped the iTunes charts in Perú on the day of its release and became one of the most streamed songs on Spotify in Perú. It is considered as one of the best songs from the album.

== Commercial performance and reception ==
The song had airplay success in Perú entering the charts from 2018-2019. It was well received by his fan base and it also helped Gian Marco get a bunch of new listeners on streaming platforms.

== Live performance ==
Gian Marco first performed the song two days before its original release on Un Nuevo Día. He was invited as a special guest due to the first game of Perú vs Denmark on June 16, 2018 for the 2018 FIFA World Cup.

== Music video ==
The video for "Bésame" was released on July 17, 2018 on Gian Marco's official channel. The video shows Gian Marco singing the song in a gas station diner playing his charango.

== Charts ==
=== Weekly charts ===
Chart (2018)	Peak position
Perú (Monitor Latino)	13

=== Year-end charts ===
Chart (2019)	Position
Perú Pop (Monitor Latino)	41
