= You Can't Walk Away from Love =

Single by Gloria Estefan

from the album Greatest Hits Vol. II
- Released: February 10, 2001 (US)
- Recorded: 2001
- Genre: Adult contemporary
- Length: 4:41 (album version); 4:14 (movie version)
- Label: Epic
- Songwriter(s): Gloria Estefan; Emilio Estefan, Jr
- Producer(s): Estefan, Jr.; Randall Barlow

Gloria Estefan singles chronology
"Por Un Beso" (2000)	"You Can't Walk Away from Love" (2001)	"Out of Nowhere" (2001)

"You Can't Walk Away from Love" is a 2001 song by American-Cuban singer Gloria Estefan. It was released as the first single from her third compilation album, Greatest Hits Vol. II on February 10, 2001 by Epic Records. The song was written by Estefan, her husband, Emilio and produced by Estefan, Jr. and Randall Barlow. It was featured in the 2001 film Original Sin starring Angelina Jolie and Antonio Banderas. The music video for the song features Estefan singing alongside scenes of the movie. The song peaked at number twenty-two on the Billboard Adult Contemporary chart.

== Critical reception ==
AllMusic editor Jose F. Promis described the song as a "dramatic, sweeping, Middle Eastern-tinged ballad" and wrote that it ranks among Estefan's best songs. Jeremy Griffin from The Ithacan noted it as "haunting", adding that it "showcases her flare for the dramatic ballad".

== Charts ==
Chart (2001)	Peak position
US Adult Contemporary (Billboard)	21

== Official versions ==
Original versions

1. Album version — 4:41
2. Original Movie Version Edit — 4:14
3. AC Version — 4:09
