= Al Quinto Día =

Studio album by Gian Marco
- Released: 1997
- Recorded: 1997
- Studio: El Techo Studio (Lima, Peru)
- Genre: Latin pop, ballad
- Length: 40:04
- Language: Spanish
- Label: BMG, Ariola Records
- Producer: Gian Marco

Gian Marco chronology
| Señora, Cuénteme (1996) | Al Quinto Día (1997) | A Tiempo (2002) |

Singles from Al Quinto Día
- 1. "Si Estuvieras Aquí" Released: 1997; 2. "Corazón en la Ciudad" Released: 1997; 3. "Verano o Primavera en Abril" Released: 1997; 4. "Fragilidad" Released: 1997

Al Quinto Día (English: "On the Fifth Day") is the fifth studio album by the Peruvian singer-songwriter Gian Marco, released by BMG and Ariola Records in 1997. It was released just one year after his previous album, Señora, Cuénteme, and was his last album to be released only in Peru as an independent artist before he moved to the United States in order to further his career.

== Background and release ==
Marco said that every song in the album is a way of him narrating his story over the previous 10 years that he had been a musician. The album had success in Peru, where it was certified gold, and also in Colombia where it was praised for its ballad pop songs. moved to the United States in order to further his career.

== Track listing ==
All credits adapted from Discogs.

| No. | Title | Writer(s) | Length |
|---|---|---|---|
| 1. | "Si Estuvieras Aquí" | Gian Marco Zignago | 5:37 |
| 2. | "Verano o Primavera en Abril" | Zignago | 4:25 |
| 3. | "Mírame" (re-recorded, originally on the first album Gian Marco) | Zignago | 4:10 |
| 4. | "Sé Que Piensas en Mí" | Zignago | 5:09 |
| 5. | "Muero por Ti" | Zignago | 4:26 |
| 6. | "Fragilidad" | Zignago | 4:23 |
| 7. | "Corazón en la Ciudad" | Zignago | 3:48 |
| 8. | "Déjame Amarte" | Zignago | 3:51 |
| 9. | "Funky Aha" | Zignago | 4:11 |
| Total length: | | | 40:04 |

== Certifications and Sales ==
| Region | Certification | Certified units/sales |
|---|---|---|
| Peru (IFPI Peru) | Gold | 5,000^ |
