= Out of Nowhere (Gloria Estefan song) =

Single by Gloria Estefan

from the album Greatest Hits Vol. II
- Released: April 24, 2001
- Recorded: 2001
- Genre: Dance
- Length: 3:43
- Label: Epic
- Songwriters: Emilio Estefan, Jr.; Randall Barlow; Liza Quintana
- Producers: Emilio Estefan, Jr.; Randall Barlow

Gloria Estefan singles chronology
"You Can't Walk Away from Love" (2001)	"Out of Nowhere" (2001)	"Y-Tu-Conga" (2001)

"Out of Nowhere" is a song by Gloria Estefan. The single was the only commercial release of the compilation Greatest Hits Vol. II. The song is written by Emilio Estefan, Jr., Randall Barlow and Liza Quintana, and produced by Estefan Jr. and Barlow. It was released as the album's second single on April 24, 2001, by Epic Records.

== Song history ==
This song was the first single released commercially for the compilation and was hit on the dance charts, becoming another top ten hit for Estefan at the Hot Dance Club Play chart, peaked at number 6. It also peaked at number 11 on the Hot Dance Music/Maxi-Singles Sales chart. The song was nominated for several dance awards including the Grammy Award for Best Dance Recording but lost to Janet Jackson's hit, "All for You". "Out of Nowhere" was also nominated for two International Latin Billboard Music Awards for Latin Dance Club Play Track of the Year and Latin Dance Maxi-Single of the Year.

== Formats and track listings ==
- US CD single
1. "Out of Nowhere" (Radio Edit) – 3:05
2. "Por Un Beso" – 5:01
- US CD promo-single
1. "Out of Nowhere" (Radio Edit) – 3:05
2. "Out of Nowhere" (Thunderpuss Radio Edit) – 3:59
3. "Out of Nowhere" (Metro Radio Edit) – 3:41
4. "Out of Nowhere" (Boris & Beck Radio Edit) – 2:47
5. "Out of Nowhere" (Album Version) – 3:43
- US CD maxi-single
1. "Out of Nowhere" (Thunderpuss Radio Edit) – 3:59
2. "Out of Nowhere" (Metro Radio Edit) – 3:41
3. "Out of Nowhere" (Boris & Beck Radio Edit) – 2:47
4. "Out of Nowhere" (Thunderpuss Club Mix) – 8:48
5. "Out of Nowhere" (Odaham's Afro-Samba Mix) – 7:42
6. "Out of Nowhere" (Boris & Beck Uplifting Club Mix) – 7:36
7. "Out of Nowhere" (Metro Extended Remix) – 6:29
8. "Out of Nowhere" (Vito Andolini's High Desert Mix) – 8:45
9. "Y-Tu Conga" (Unreleased Mix) – 7:52
- US 12" vinyl-single
1. "Out of Nowhere" (Thunderpuss Club Mix) – 8:48
2. "Out of Nowhere" (Metro Extended Remix) – 6:29
3. "Out of Nowhere" (Boris & Beck Uplifting Club Mix) – 7:36
4. "Out of Nowhere" (Vito Andolini's High Desert Mix) – 8:45
- Europe CD Maxi-single
1. "Out of Nowhere" (Metro Radio Edit) – 3:41
2. "Out of Nowhere" (Album Version) – 3:43
3. "Out of Nowhere" (Thunderpuss Club Mix) – 8:48
4. "Y-Tu Conga" (Cubarico Mix) – 7:38
- UK 12" vinyl-single
1. "Out of Nowhere" (Metro Extended Remix) – 6:29
2. "Out of Nowhere" (Thunderpuss Club Mix) – 8:48

== Chart performance ==
Chart (2001)	Peak position
Spain (AFYVE)	22
UK Singles (Official Charts)	94
US Dance Club Songs (Billboard)	6
US Dance Singles Sales (Billboard)	11
