= Yisel =

American singer-songwriter

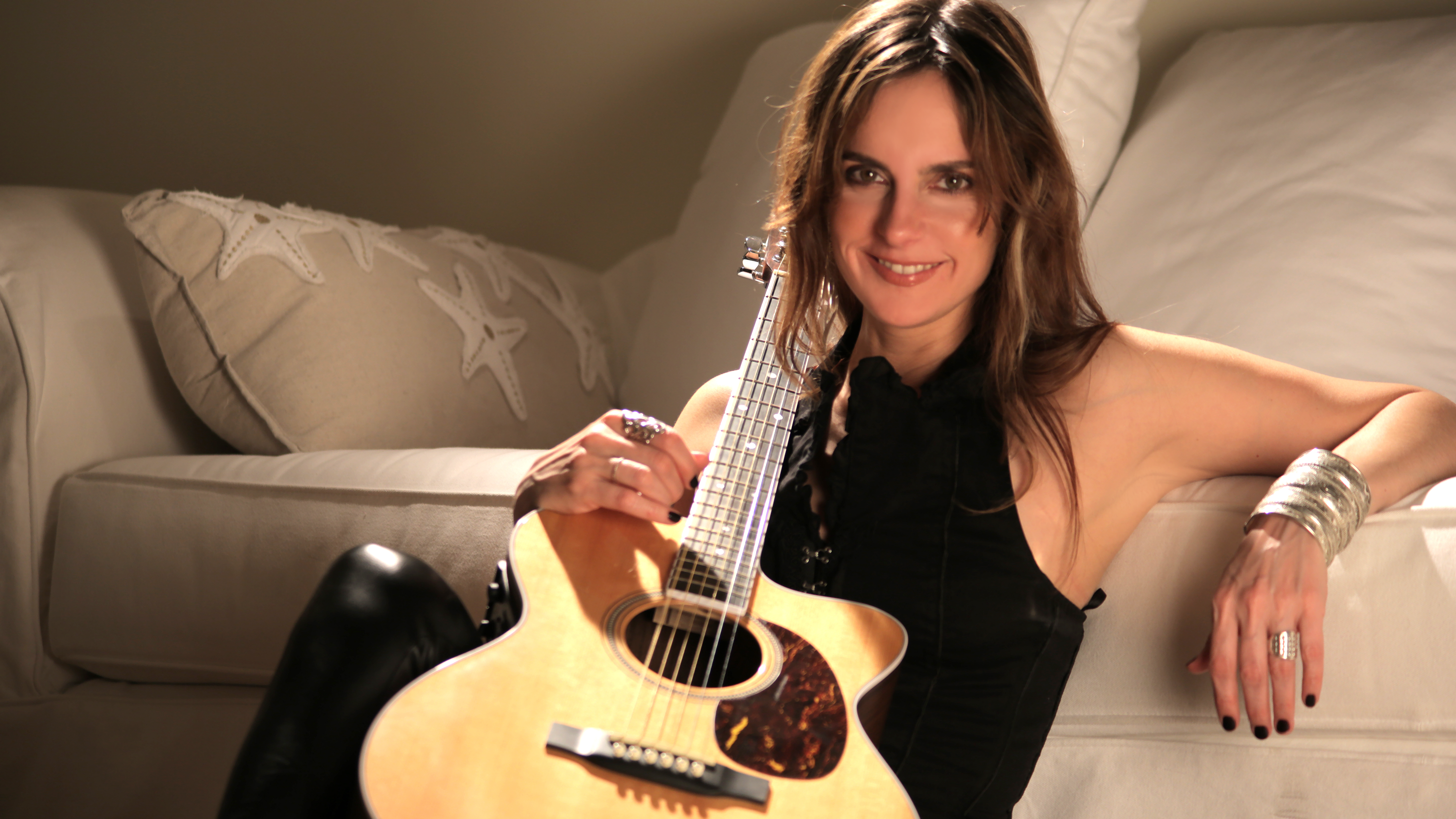

Background information
- Born: Yisel Denís Duque; November 3, 1971 (age 54); Havana, Cuba
- Genres: Singer-songwriter, world beat, alternative pop, lounge, electronic, world music, indie pop, J-synth, cool, fusion, electro-pop
- Occupations: Artist, singer, songwriter
- Instrument: Voice
- Label: Duque Productions
- Website: yisel.com

Yisel Denís Duque (better known under the stage name Yisel) is a Cuban-American singer-songwriter and producer. She was born in Havana, Cuba and has lived in Miami since 1988.

== Early life ==
Duque was born in Havana, Cuba on November 3, 1971, the younger of two siblings. In her native Havana and at her own home, she witnessed many local artists gathered for impromptu jam sessions. Yisel began singing at the young age of four. At twelve, she began to study classical guitar in the Escuela Nacional de Arte (National School of Arts, ENA), but had to quit because her family migrated to live in Panama. In 1988, her family moved to Miami, where she still lives.

== Career ==
Upon her arrival in Miami, she became the youngest singer at "La Peña de la Trova", a private-owned residence in which artists would meet to sing, act, paint, and read poetry. Later on, she started college, but she quit and enrolled in the music department of Miami Dade Community College.

In 1993, an audition got her a scholarship to enter the University of Miami School of Music to study Jazz Vocal Performance, thanks to an audition, she was chosen by record producers to sing on various projects for major labels. She graduated from the UM and joined ASCAP (American Society of Composers and Publishers).

In 2002, Yisel started a jazz group named "Common Time", with a mix of influences and different styles. The group was dissolved in 2003.

That year, she began performing as a leader and background vocalist in world tours with different artists and projects, including Gloria Estefan's Live & Unwrapped, and Chayanne's No hay imposibles and En todo estaré. She also participated in many record productions and collaborated with musicians like Shakira, Alejandro Sanz, Ricky Martin, Carole King, Kevin Spacey, Lila Downs, Marc Anthony, Natalie Cole, and Prince Royce, among others.

In September 2014, she pre-released her debut album Life Is , with a sold-out concert in the Jackie Gleason Theater of Miami Beach. The album is described as a "fusion of fusions" and has been regarded as "electromagnetic". It had its worldwide release on October 6 of the same year on iTunes, Amazon, CD Baby and most online stores.

She is still composing and is affiliated with various publishing companies such as Sony Music Publishing, Universal Music Publishing, Musical Productions and Sonolux, and others.

Her musical style combines elements of pop, R&B, electronic music, jazz, chill-out, and Brazilian music.
