= Tú No Te Imaginas =

2018 single by Gian Marco

Single by Gian Marco

from the album Intuición
- Released: September 15, 2018
- Genre: Latin pop
- Length: 3:27
- Label: Enjoymusic
- Songwriter: Gian Marco Zignago

Gian Marco singles chronology
"Bésame" (2018)	"Tú No Te Imaginas" (2018)	"Sácala a Bailar" (2019)

Music video
- "Tú No Te Imaginas" on YouTube

"Tú No Te Imaginas (Bachata Remix)"

Single by Gian Marco featuring Debi Nova

from the album Intuición
- Released: December 3, 2018
- Genre: Bachata
- Length: 3:27
- Label: Enjoymusic
- Songwriter: Gian Marco Zignago

Debi Nova singles chronology
"Paradise" (2018)	"Tú No Te Imaginas (Bachata Remix)" (2018)	"Quedate" (2019)

Music video
- "Tú No Te Imaginas" on YouTube

Tú No Te Imaginas (English: "You Don't Imagine") is a song by Peruvian singer-songwriter Gian Marco released by Enjoymusic as the second single of his thirteenth studio album Intuición. A Bachata version of the song is included on the album and a Bachata remix version featuring Costa Rican singer Debi Nova was released on December 3, 2018.

== Release and reception ==
The song was released on September 15, 2018 on all digital platforms and a video was released on Gian Marco's official YouTube channel as the second single from his album Intuición and the last on to be released before the album. The song became known as one of Gian Marco's biggest hits. It is considered as one of the best songs from the album.

== Music video ==
The video for the song was released on the same day as the song. The video starts with Gian Marco performing the song in a bar where a couple meet and start a relationship. The video then follows the couple as their relationship starts to struggle. A music video for the Bachata remix featuring Devi Nova was released on December 3, 2018. The video features Gian Marco and Debi Nova in a studio singing the song acoustically while Gian Marco plays the guitar.

== Charts ==
=== Weekly charts ===
Chart (2018–2019)	Peak position
Perú (Monitor Latino)	14
Perú Pop (Monitor Latino)	9

=== Year-end charts ===
Chart (2019)	Position
Perú (Monitor Latino)	90
Perú Pop (Monitor Latino)	12

Chart (2020)	Position
Perú Pop (Monitor Latino)	84
