= Unwrapped (album) =

Studio album by Gloria Estefan
- Released: September 22, 2003
- Studios: Crescent Moon Studios, Miami
- Genre: Pop
- Length: 60:32
- Label: Epic
- Producers: Gloria Estefan; Emilio Estefan; Sebastian Krys

Gloria Estefan chronology
Greatest Hits Vol. II (2001)	Unwrapped (2003)	Amor y Suerte: Exitos Romanticos (2004)

Singles from Unwrapped
- 1. "Wrapped/Hoy" Released: August 2003; 2. "I Wish You" Released: February 2004 (Europe) March 2004 (U.S.); 3. "Te Amaré" Released: February 2004 (Spain); 4. "Tu Fotografía" Released: February 2004 (U.S., Argentina)

Unwrapped is the tenth studio solo album and twenty-fourth album overall by Cuban-American singer Gloria Estefan, released in 2003. It was also her first English language studio album since 1998's gloria!.

== Content ==
The album is a departure in sound from Estefan's previous works. The album was recorded live, unlike any of her other studio albums. There is less reverb on Estefan's vocals, to create an intimate feeling. The album is acoustic and is designed to feel like an unplugged album. This is the first Estefan album to not feature a brass section.

Estefan worked with notable artists on the album; Stevie Wonder played harmonica and sang on "Into You," while Chrissie Hynde appeared on "One Name". "Hoy," which became one of Estefan's most successful singles, was written by Peruvian singer-composer Gian Marco and contains several Peruvian folk music elements.

The album uses the theme of unwrapping herself to the world in the lyrics, recording, and artwork. The picture on the back cover is actually Estefan's back. Next to the title, "Into You," there is a pink line that runs down to the bottom, which is the scar from her back surgery when she broke her back in 1990. The picture above the "I Will Always Need Your Love" lyrics is Gloria holding hands with her husband Emilio, for whom the song was written, likewise, the picture of the hand pointing to the lyrics to "You" is Gloria's daughter, Emily.

== Promotion ==
To promote the album, Estefan launched the American tour Live & Re-Wrapped Tour which was made after her Live & Unwrapped performances at Caesars Palace in Las Vegas.

In addition, Estefan released a remix EP under the name of Unwrapped: Remixes; the EP was a Bonus Promo CD that was available with purchase of the Live & Unwrapped DVD during pay-per-view broadcasts and purchases of the DVD at shows during the Live & Re-Wrapped Tour.

== Critical reception ==
Professional ratings
Review scores
Source	Rating
AllMusic	2/5 stars
Blender	2/5 stars
Celebrity Cafe	8.5/10 stars
MSN Music	1.5/5 stars
USA Today	3/4 stars
Vibe	3/5 stars

Writing for USA Today, Elysa Gardner found that Unwrapped "reaffirms [Estefan's] status as one of pop's most resourceful survivors. Though she lacks the vocal color, range and attitude required of a true diva, Estefan retains an affinity for mixing Latin, folk, adult-contemporary and world music textures into a robust but digestible stew." AllMusic editor David Jeffries felt that Unwrapped "stumbles over itself trying to put Estefan's emotional lyrics up front [...] Without even a hint of levity, sitting through the whole album feels like an exhausting open-mic night at the coffee shop [...] Covering up the underdeveloped writing with sonic overkill, it is as least interesting and a good setup for the expected "return-to-form" album."

== Awards ==
Year	Award Show	Award
2004	Billboard Latin Music Awards	Top Latin Pop Airplay Track-Female of the Year, "Hoy"
2005	Billboard Latin Music Awards	Top Latin Tropical Track of the Year, "Tu Fotografía"

== Track listing ==
Worldwide CD, Limited Edition CD+DVD & Cassette Release
No.	Title	Writer(s)	Length
1.	"A Little Push"	Gloria Estefan; John Falcone; Sebastian Krys; Jon Secada	3:56
2.	"Te Amaré"	G. Estefan; Emilio Estefan; Krys; Tony Mardini; Tom McWilliams	3:02
3.	"Your Picture"	G. Estefan; Gian Marco	3:50
4.	"Wrapped"	G. Estefan; Gian Marco	3:27
5.	"Time Waits"	G. Estefan; Falcone; Krys	4:25
6.	"In the Meantime"	G. Estefan; Gian Marco	3:36
7.	"Dangerous Game"	G. Estefan; Falcone; Krys; Secada	3:17
8.	"Into You" (Duet with Stevie Wonder)	G. Estefan; C. De Yarza; Maceo Morris	3:20
9.	"One Name" (Duet with Chrissie Hynde)	G. Estefan; Archie Peña	3:04
10.	"I Will Always Need Your Love"	G. Estefan; E. Estefan; Alberto Gaitán; Ricardo Gaitán; Mardini	3:05
11.	"Say Goodbye"	G. Estefan; Falcone; Krys; Secada	3:53
12.	"I Wish You"	G. Estefan; Falcone; Krys	3:52
13.	"You"	G. Estefan; E. Estefan; A. Gaitán; R. Gaitán; Mardini; McWilliams	3:09
14.	"Famous"	G. Estefan	3:20
15.	"Te Amaré" (Spanish Version)	G. Estefan; E. Estefan; Krys; Mardini; McWilliams	3:03
16.	"Tu Fotografía" ("Your Picture" – Spanish Version)	E. Estefan; Gian Marco	3:48
17.	"Hoy" ("Wrapped" – Spanish Version)	Gian Marco	3:27
18.	"Mientras Tanto" ("In the Meantime" – Spanish Version)	Gian Marco	3:38

Bonus DVD
No.	Title	Producer(s)	Length
1.	"Famous: The Documentary"	Nayib Estefan

Spain & Latin American CD, Limited Edition CD+DVD & Cassette Release
No.	Title	Writer(s)	Length
1.	"Tu Fotografía" ("Your Picture" – Spanish Version)	E. Estefan; Gian Marco	3:48
2.	"Te Amaré" (Spanish Version)	G. Estefan; E. Estefan; Krys; Mardini; McWilliams	3:03
3.	"Mientras Tanto" ("In the Meantime" – Spanish Version)	Gian Marco	3:38
4.	"Hoy" ("Wrapped" – Spanish Version)	Gian Marco	3:27
5.	"Time Waits"	G. Estefan; Falcone; Krys	4:25
6.	"A Little Push"	G. Estefan; Falcone; Krys; Secada	3:56
7.	"Dangerous Game"	G. Estefan; Falcone; Krys; Secada	3:17
8.	"Into You" (Duet with Stevie Wonder)	G. Estefan; C. De Yarza; Maceo Morris	3:20
9.	"One Name" (Duet with Chrissie Hynde)	G. Estefan; Peña	3:04
10.	"I Will Always Need Your Love"	G. Estefan; E. Estefan; A. Gaitan; R. Gaitan; Mardini	3:05
11.	"Say Goodbye"	G. Estefan; Falcone; Krys; Secada	3:53
12.	"I Wish You"	G. Estefan; Falcone; Krys	3:52
13.	"You"	G. Estefan; E. Estefan; A. Gaitán; R. Gaitán; Mardini; McWilliams	3:09
14.	"Famous"	G. Estefan	3:20
15.	"Te Amaré"	G. Estefan; E. Estefan; Krys; Mardini; McWilliams	3:02
16.	"Your Picture"	G. Estefan; Gian Marco	3:50
17.	"Wrapped"	G. Estefan; Gian Marco	3:27
18.	"In the Meantime"	G. Estefan; Gian Marco	3:36

Bonus DVD
No.	Title	Producer(s)	Length
1.	"Famous: The Documentary"	N. Estefan

== Personnel ==
Adapted from AllMusic.

- Pedro Alfonso - violin
- Meredith Mora Arriaga - accordion
- Christopher Austopchuk - design direction
- Eric Barnard - hair stylist
- Tim Barnes - viola
- Kurt Berge - technical support
- Carlos "El Bola" Betancourt - cover art
- Edwin Bonilla - drums, percussion
- Susanne Cerha - art direction, design
- Vadim Chislov - assistant engineer
- Michael C. Collins - assistant engineer
- Mike Couzzi - engineer
- Kevin Dillon - project coordinator
- Luis Enrique - drums, guest artist, percussion
- Emilio Estefan Jr. - producer
- Gloria Estefan - primary artist, producer
- John Falcone - arranger, bass, string arrangements
- Jorge Felix - assistant engineer
- Trevor Fletcher - studio manager
- Richard Flieschman - viola
- Orlando J. Forte - violin
- Julie Gardner - engineer
- Chris Glansdorp - cello
- Arthur Hanlon - piano
- Ross Harbaugh - cello
- Kent Hertz - assistant engineer
- Chrissie Hynde - guest artist, vocals
- Claudio Jaffe - cello
- Sidney Jamila - make-up
- Femi Jiya - engineer
- Steve Jones - digital editing
- Manu Katché - drums
- Sebastián Krys - arranger, cavaquinho, charango, cuatro, engineer, lakota flute, mixing, producer, programming, quena, string arrangements, zampona
- Leyla Leeming - project coordinator
- Bob Ludwig - mastering
- Mei Mei Luo - violin
- Patrick Magee - assistant engineer
- José Juan Maldonado - project coordinator
- Tony Mardini - arranger
- Tom McWilliams - arranger, drums
- Steve Menezes - studio manager
- Susan Moyer - cello
- Scott ODonnell - viola
- Alfredo Oliva - concert master, violin
- Laszio Pap - violin
- Ruben Parra - studio manager
- Luis Pastor - bass
- Andy Pechenik - technical support
- Billie Pechenik - project coordinator
- Archie Pena - arranger, drums, percussion
- Marco Peña - hair stylist
- Daniel Ponce - assistant engineer
- Juan Rosario - assistant engineer
- Juan Antonio Salazar - conductor, orchestration, string arrangements
- Eric Schilling - engineer
- Jon Secada - guest artist, background vocals
- Rafael Solano - drums, percussion
- Simon Soong - technical support
- Debra Spring - viola
- Ron Taylor - engineer, fender rhodes, mellotron, organ (hammond), piano, wurlitzer
- Ken Theis - assistant engineer, mixing assistant
- Alberto Tolot - cover portrait
- Peter Vargo - assistant
- Jose "Pepe" Velazquez - drums, drum technician
- Mario Vergel - stylist, typography
- Dan Warner - guitar, mandolin, tres
- Ryan Wolff - assistant engineer
- Stevie Wonder - guest artist, harmonica, vocal ad-libs

== Singles ==
#	Title	Date
1.	"Wrapped/Hoy"	August 2003
2.	"I Wish You"	February 2004 (Europe) March 2004 (U.S.)
3.	"Te Amaré"	February 2004 (Spain)
4.	"Tu Fotografía"	April 2004 (U.S., Argentina)

== Chart positions ==
=== Weekly charts ===
Chart (2003)	Peak position
Belgian Albums (Ultratop Flanders)	44
Belgian Albums (Ultratop Wallonia)	45
Dutch Albums (Album Top 100)	27
French Albums (SNEP)	126
German Albums (Offizielle Top 100)	26
Italian Albums (FIMI)	11
Spanish Albums (Promusicae)	4
Swiss Albums (Schweizer Hitparade)	2
UK Albums (Official Charts)	76
US Billboard 200	39

=== Year-end Charts ===
Chart (2003)	Position
Swiss Albums (Schweizer Hitparade)	6
Chart (2004)	Position
Swiss Albums (Schweizer Hitparade)	67

== Certifications and sales ==
Region	Certification	Certified units/sales
Spain (Promusicae)	Gold	80,000
Switzerland (IFPI Switzerland)	Platinum	40,000^{^}
United States	—	162,000
^{^} Shipments figures based on certification alone.

== Release history ==
Unwrapped release history
Region	Date
Worldwide	September 22, 2003
Canada	September 23, 2003
United States	September 23, 2003
Australia	October 6, 2003
Japan	October 8, 2003
