= Días Nuevos =

Studio album by Gian Marco
- Released: 2011
- Recorded: 2010–2011
- Genre: Latin pop, rock, ballad
- Length: 42:31
- Language: Spanish
- Label: 11 y 6 Discos
- Producer: Memo Gil

Gian Marco chronology
En Tiempo Real (2010)	Días Nuevos (2011)	20 Años (2012)

Singles from Días Nuevos
- 1. "Cuéntame" Released: 2011; 2. "Dime Dónde" Released: 2011; 3. "Desde Hace Un Mes" Released: 2011

Días Nuevos is the tenth studio album by Peruvian singer-songwriter Gian Marco released by 11 y 6 Discos in 2011. It was his first album released with his new label.

== Commercial performance ==
The album had great success throughout Latin America and was certified triple platinum in Perú in July 2011. In December 2011 the album was certified quintuple platinum in Perú, breaking a record and becoming the best selling album in Perú of 2011. The album won Best Singer-Songwriter Album at the 2011 Latin Grammy Awards. He tied for the award with Amaury Gutiérrez making it his second time winning in this category and also marked the first time two artists tied for the award. That same year the album's success also won him the Premios Luces awards for Artist of the Year and Song of the Year for Dime Dónde. It is one of the best-selling album in Perú

== Track listing ==
All credits adapted from AllMusic.

No.	Title	Writer(s)	Length
1.	"Cuentame"	Gian Marco Zignago	3:49
2.	"Más Allá"	Zignago	3:13
3.	"Respirar" (featuring Alejandro Sanz)	Zignago	4:21
4.	"Desde Hace Un Mes"	Zignago	4:09
5.	"De Paseo"	Zignago	3:29
6.	"Dime Dónde" (featuring Juan Luis Guerra)	Zignago	4:15
7.	"Amores Imperfectos"	Zignago	3:33
8.	"Sabes Que Cuentas Conmigo" (featuring Diego Torres)	Zignago	3:13
9.	"En Venta"	Zignago	4:20
10.	"Si Me Tenias"	Zignago	4:01
11.	"Dias Nuevos"	Zignago	4:08

== Certifications and sales ==
Region	Certification	Certified units/sales
Perú (UNIMPRO)	5× Platinum	50,000^

== Awards ==
12th Latin Grammy Awards

Year	Nominee / work	Award	Result
2011	Días Nuevos	Best Singer-Songwriter Album	Won

Premios Luces de El Comercio

Year	Nominee / work	Award	Result
2011	Dime Dónde	Song of the Year	Won
2011	Himself	Artist of the Year	Won
