= Sácala a Bailar =

Single by Gian Marco

from the album Intuición
- Released: January 18, 2019
- Genre: Latin Pop, Salsa
- Length: 3:46
- Label: Enjoymusic
- Songwriter: Gian Marco Zignago

Gian Marco singles chronology
"Tú No Te Imaginas" (2018)	"Sácala a Bailar" (2019)	"Nadie Mas Que Tú" (2019)

Music video
- "Sácala a Bailar" on YouTube

"Sácala a Bailar" (English: "Ask Her To Dance") is a song by Peruvian singer-songwriter Gian Marco released by Enjoymusic as the third single of his thirteenth studio album Intuición.

== Release and reception ==
The song was released on January 18, 2019 on all digital platforms. The song was well received and was considered as one of the best songs of the summer in Perú. The video for the song was released on the same day, filmed in Callao, and was produced by Tondero. The video went viral and was trending in Perú. It is considered as one of the best songs from the album.

Gian Marco stated that he was not going to try urban music like most artists and decided to go for a tropical sound instead when he released this song. While some people applauded Gian Marco for releasing a catchy song, others accused him of caving into the reggaeton genre which he quickly denied stating that that's a genre that he will never do in his life and that the song it's actually a tropical song.

== Music video ==
The video was released the same day as the song on Gian Marco's official channel. The video shows Gian Marco playing his guitar and singing the song at different parties while a couple of guys see a pretty girl and follow her to try to ask her to dance but something always prevents them from asking her. The video was filmed in Unidad Modelo, La Punta, and Callao Monumental. The video stars former Miss Peru winner, Natalie Vértiz.

== Charts ==
=== Weekly charts ===
Chart (2019)	Peak position
Perú Pop (Monitor Latino)	17

=== Year-end charts ===
Chart (2019)	Position
Perú Pop (Monitor Latino)	34

== Awards and nominations ==
The song was nominated in for Song of the Year and Best Pop/Urban Song at the Premios Fama in 2019.

Year	Awards Ceremony	Category	Result
2019	Premios Fama	Song of the Year	Nominated
2019	Premios Fama	Best Pop/Urban Song	Nominated
