= 20 Años (Gian Marco album) =

Greatest hits album by Gian Marco
- Released: 2012
- Genre: Latin pop
- Producer: Guillermo Gil

Gian Marco chronology
Días Nuevos (2011)	20 Años (2012)	Versiones (2013)

20 Años is a 2012 original album by Peruvian singer Gian Marco. The disc won a Latin Grammy Award in the best singer songwriter category in 2012.

This CD was made to celebrate 20 years of artistic life. There are 20 songs, 18 of which are old but they were remastered with a change and two unreleased songs "Invisible" and "En Otra Vida". The song "Invisible" was composed by Gian Marco and Amaury Gutierrez.

For this album, Gian Marco received three nominations at the 13th Annual Latin Grammy Awards: Best Singer-Songwriter Album and Song of the Year (for "Invisible"). Gian Marco won the first category.

In 2013, he was nominated for the Premios Oye! in the categories Spanish Album of the Year, Song of the Year in Spanish (for "Invisible") and Male Solo Artist.

== Singles ==
The video of the song 'Invisible' 'premiered in August starring the actress Mónica Sánchez.

== Song list ==
20 Years
No.	Title	Length
1.	"Canción de amor"
2.	"No puedo amarte"
3.	"Parte de este juego"
4.	"Invisible"
5.	"Sé Que Piensas en Mí"
6.	"Fragilidad"
7.	"Sentirme vivo"
8.	"Se me olvidó"
9.	"Te mentiría"
10.	"Retrato"
11.	"Lamento"
12.	"Resucitar"
13.	"Lejos de ti"
14.	"Al otro lado de la luna"
15.	"Hoy"
16.	"En otra vida"
17.	"Hasta que vuelvas conmigo"
18.	"Canta corazón"
19.	"Dime donde"
20.	"Días nuevos"

== Awards and nominations ==
=== Latin Grammy Award ===
Year	Nominated song	Category	Outcome
2012	20 Años	Best Singer-Songwriter Album	Winner
2012	"Invisible" (with Amaury Gutiérrez)	Song of the year	Nominated

=== Premios Oye! ===
Year	Nominated song	Category	Output
2013	20 Años	Spanish Album of the Year	Nominated
2013	"Invisible"	Spanish Song of the Year	Nominated
2013	Él mismo	Male Soloist of the Year	Nominated
