= Greatest Hits Vol. II (Gloria Estefan album) =

Greatest hits album by Gloria Estefan
- Released: February 6, 2001
- Studio: Crescent Moon Studios, Miami
- Genre: Pop, dance
- Length: 57:23 (U.S. version); 60:46 (European version)
- Label: Epic
- Producer: Emilio Estefan Jr.

Gloria Estefan chronology
| Alma Caribeña (2000) | Greatest Hits Vol. II (2001) | Unwrapped (2003) |

Singles from Greatest Hits Vol. II
- 1. "You Can't Walk Away from Love" Released: February 10, 2001; 2. "Out of Nowhere" Released: April 24, 2001; 3. "Y-Tu-Conga" Released: August 2001 (Promotional)

Greatest Hits Vol. II is the third English greatest hits album released by American singer Gloria Estefan, but is the fourth compilation and twenty-third album overall, released on February 6, 2001, by Epic Records.

== Content ==
Professional ratings
Review scores
| Source | Rating |
|---|---|
| Allmusic | 4/5 stars |

Greatest Hits Vol. II is the follow-up to Estefan's first English hits album (Best of Gloria Estefan was released only in Europe). The album includes most of her English single releases, spanning her albums Mi Terra (1993) up to Gloria! (1998). It also includes the 1999 single "Music of My Heart" with *NSYNC.

The compilation includes three new songs and one new remix. "You Can't Walk Away from Love" was released as the first single from the album and was featured on the 2001 film Original Sin starring Antonio Banderas and Angelina Jolie. "Out of Nowhere" was released as the album's second single. "Y-Tu-Conga", a remix of Estefan's single "Conga, was released as the album's third single. The final new song included is "I Got No Love". The album also includes "If We Were Lovers", which is the English version of Estefan's 1993 hit Spanish single, "Con Los Años Que Me Quedan". While the Spanish version was included on Mi Tierra, the English version of the song was only promotionally released and had not been made commercially available prior to the release of Greatest Hits Vol. II.

Estefan's English singles "It's Too Late", "Cherchez La Femme", "Higher", "Cuba Libre", and "Don't Let This Moment End" were not included on the album. "Don't Let This Moment End" was initially included, but was removed on the final track listing.

The album peaked at number 92 on the Billboard Top 200.

== Track listing ==
International CD, Cassette & MiniDisc Releases
| No. | Title | Writer(s) | Album | Length |
|---|---|---|---|---|
| 1. | "Turn the Beat Around" | Peter Jackson, Gerald Jackson | Hold Me, Thrill Me, Kiss Me | 3:53 |
| 2. | "Everlasting Love" | Buzz Cason, Mac Gayden | Hold Me, Thrill Me, Kiss Me | 4:01 |
| 3. | "Reach" | Gloria Estefan, Diane Warren | Destiny | 3:50 |
| 4. | "If We Were Lovers" | G. Estefan, Emilio Estefan, Jr | Mi Tierra | 4:38 |
| 5. | "You'll Be Mine (Party Time)" (Single Mix) | E. Estefan, Lawrence Dermer, Clay Ostwald | Destiny | 4:02 |
| 6. | "Heaven's What I Feel" | Kike Santander | gloria! | 5:02 |
| 7. | "Hold Me, Thrill Me, Kiss Me" | Harry Noble, Jr. | Hold Me, Thrill Me, Kiss Me | 3:23 |
| 8. | "I'm Not Giving You Up" (Single Remix) | G. Estefan, Kike Santander | Destiny | 4:32 |
| 9. | "Music of My Heart" (with *NSYNC) | G. Estefan, Warren | The Music of the Heart (Original Motion Picture Soundtrack) | 4:32 |
| 10. | "Oye!" | G. Estefan, E. Estefan, Randall Barlow, Angie Chorine | gloria! | 4:40 |
| 11. | "You Can't Walk Away From Love" | G. Estefan, E. Estefan | Previously unreleased | 4:41 |
| 12. | "Out of Nowhere" | E. Estefan, Barlow, Liza Quintana | Previously unreleased | 3:43 |
| 13. | "I Got No Love" | E. Estefan, Jon Secada, Sebastian Krys | Previously unreleased | 4:07 |
| 14. | "Y-Tu-Conga" | Enrique E. Garcia | Previously unreleased | 6:04 |

Japan CD Release Bonus Track
| No. | Title | Writer(s) | Album | Length |
|---|---|---|---|---|
| 15. | "Y-Tu-Conga" (Unreleased Mix) | Garcia | Previously unreleased | 7:52 |

Notes:

- "Hold Me, Thrill Me, Kiss Me" is excluded from US and Canadian editions.
- "Turn The Beat Around" is labeled as the "Classic Mix" and "Everlasting Love" is labeled as the "Video Version", but these are both the original album versions.

== Charts ==
=== Weekly charts ===
| Chart (2001) | Peak position |
|---|---|
| European Albums (European Top 100 Albums) | 69 |
| German Albums (Offizielle Top 100) | 48 |
| Italian Albums (FIMI) | 44 |
| Spanish Albums (Promusicae) | 15 |
| Swiss Albums (Schweizer Hitparade) | 17 |
| UK Albums (OCC) | 60 |
| US Billboard 200 | 92 |

== Certifications ==
| Region | Certification | Certified units/sales |
|---|---|---|
| Spain (Promusicae) | Gold | 50,000^{^} |
^{^} Shipments figures based on certification alone.

== Release history ==
| Country | Release date |
|---|---|
| Canada | February 6, 2001 |
| U.S. | February 6, 2001 |
| International | February 12, 2001 |
| Australia | March 5, 2001 |
| Japan | March 7, 2001 |
| Hong Kong (K2HD Mastering Reissue) | March 3, 2014 |
