= Te Amaré (Gloria Estefan song) =

Single by Gloria Estefan

from the album Unwrapped
- Released: February 2004 (Spain)
- Genre: Latin pop
- Length: 3:02
- Label: Epic
- Songwriters: Gloria M. Estefan, Emilio Estefan Jr., Sebastian Krys, Tony Mardini, Tom McWilliams

Gloria Estefan singles chronology
"I Wish You" (2003/2004)	"Te Amaré" (2004)	"Tu Fotografía" (2004)

"Te Amaré" (I Will Love You) was the fourth single released by Gloria Estefan on her tenth studio album Unwrapped. The single was exclusively released in Spain, where it became a hit.

== Charts ==
"Te Amaré" was released only at Spain, and reached the top ten of the singles chart.

Chart (2004)	Peak position
Spain (Promusicae)	7
Eurochart Hot 100 Singles	43
World Latin Top 30 Singles	27
