= Gian Marco =

Peruvian musician (born 1970)

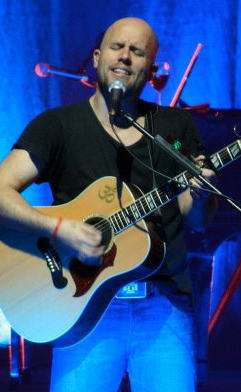
- Gian Marco in 2011
- Born: Gian Marco Javier Zignago Alcóver; 17 August 1970 (age 56); Lima, Peru
- Other names: Giani; Gianmarco
- Occupations: Musician; singer; composer; actor
- Parents: Joe Danova (father); Regina Alcóver (mother)
- Musical career
- Genres: Pop; Rock; Vals
- Instruments: Guitar; piano; charango
- Years active: 1987–present
- Label: Sony Music

Gian Marco Javier Zignago Alcóver (born 17 August 1970), known mononymously as Gian Marco (Spanish pronunciation: [ɟʝam ˈmaɾko]), is a Peruvian musician and actor. He has won the Latin Grammy Award for the Best Singer-Songwriter Album three times. First in 2005 for his album Resucitar, in 2011 for his album Días Nuevos, and in 2012 for his album 20 Años. Gian Marco was named UNICEF Goodwill Ambassador in Peru.

His mother is the Peruvian actress and singer Regina Alcóver, and his father was the late Peruvian composer and singer Joe Danova.

== Biography ==
=== Childhood beginnings ===
Gian Marco was born in Lima, Peru, on 17 August 1970. His mother is actress and singer María Regina Alcóver Ureta, while his father is composer and singer Javier Óscar Florencio Zignago Viñas, also known as Joe Danova. As the son of artists, Gian Marco was introduced to music at very early age. The art surrounded him during his childhood. Gian Marco grew up listening to the songs of his father, and watching his mother perform in theater.

As a child he traveled with his parents and learned to love the life style of an artist. At age 12, Gian Marco sang for the first time on television in the Argentine TV show Domingos Gigantes (Giant Sundays), broadcast by Channel 9 in Buenos Aires under the direction of Orlando Marconi. A year later, Gian Marco sang in Caracas on the TV show La Revista de los Sábados (The Saturday Magazine) impressing viewers that enjoyed a thirteen-year-old child singing a popular song titled "Eva Maria". At the age of six he recorded a 45 rpm together with his father entitled "Navidad Es" ("Christmas Is").

Gian Marco attended elementary school, middle school, and high school at the Colegio Santa Margarita located in Monterrico, a middle-class neighborhood in the district of Santiago de Surco, in Lima. He played the guitar and sang in all school activities. In 1981, at age 11, Gian Marco recorded a song for the musical Papito Piernas Largas (Daddy Long Legs). His mother also participated in the play. During his youth, Gian Marco participated in a series of artistic events, singing and acting, developing his talents and preparing for what would become a successful career.

After finishing school, at the age of 18, Gian Marco traveled to Santiago de Chile to pursue a graphic design career. Although things were going well for him in the graphic design field, Gian Marco continued to feel the pull of a music career. To prove himself as an artist, he began playing in the most popular venues in Santiago and Viña del Mar where he began to make a name for himself.

=== First album ===
A year and a half later he returned to Lima and one of his songs classified for the national selection of the OTI Festival 1989 and his first contract with a record label which proyected him to Chile and Bolivia as well as doing theater and alternating in the telenovela "Velo negro, velo blanco with Braulio Castillo Jr. and Gustavo Rojo. He managed to capture the attention of the press, being the most publicized artist at the event. It was there that Discos Independientes proposed recording his first album. At the beginning of 1990 his first production hit the national record market with the title Gian Marco: Historias that achieved hits as "Domitila" and "Mírame" ("Look at me"), under the musical direction of Pepe Ortega.

In 1992 he recorded his second album, production with the title Personal, produced in Santiago, Chile, by Pepe Ortega. From this recording the songs "Te Extrañaré" ("I Will Miss You") and "Dame un Beso" ("Give Me a Kiss") made the charts that year. In September 1993 he won first place in the national selection for the OTI Festival, and gained the right to represent Peru in the OTI Festival 1993 with his song "Volvamos a empezar" ("Let's Start Over").

=== Television and national recognition ===
In the mid to late 1990s he came back with other successful productions. He began to dedicate himself to composing songs, and he was called to conduct one of the most popular game shows, Campaneando, with Bruno Pinasco. Conducting this program was crucial in gaining the recognition of the wider Peruvian public. His television appearance combined with a prolific period of musical activity. He composed and recorded the albums Entre la arena y la luna, (Between the Sand and the Moon) (1994), Señora, Cuénteme (Lady, Tell Me) (1994), and Al Quinto Día (On the Fifth Day) (1997). His fourth album, Señora, Cuénteme, is a tribute to canción criolla in which he affirms with his music the appreciation that he has for the feeling of native peoples like those in Perú.

=== International success ===
Inspired by his own dreams and a blind faith in his talent, Gian Marco decided to travel to the United States, convinced that he needed to introduce his artistic talent to the international market. He got the attention of Emilio Estefan who hired him as a composer and performer. He worked with Estefan on a couple tracks for Mandy Moore's self-titled album. This did not stop him from working on his own material, and he published A Tiempo (On Time) (2002) under the label Crescent Moon/Sony; this album was heard on the most significant radio stations in the world, and sold more than 50,000 copies in Spain. The album earned him with three Latin Grammy nominations and confirmed him as the most significant Peruvian sing-songwriter of recent times.

In that same year, Gian Marco recorded the theme song for the Americas Cup (Soccer) that would be played in Perú in 2004. The song entitled "Más allá de los sueños" ("Beyond Dreams"), became a resounding success. In 2003, he received the "Artista Revelación Latino" (Emerging Latin Artist) prize in the Musical Arts Awards of the Sociedad General de Autores y Editores de España (SGAE) (Spanish General Society of Authors and Editors).

Later came the album Resucitar (Resurrection) (2004), a much more organic album that, as he says "doesn't sing as much about lost love as the previous one, it's a more positive album". This disc had unbelievable success, which brought him a Latin Grammy in 2005. Several singles were released from this album: "Resucitar" ("Resurrection"), "Sin querer" ("By Accident"), "Gota de lluvia" ("A Drop of Rain"), "Después de mi" ("After Me"), "Lejos de ti", ("Far from You"), and "Soy" ("I Am").

=== 15 years of career ===
In 2005 Gian Marco held a show at the Estadio Monumental de Perú to celebrate his career of 15 years, and had more than 40,000 spectators. Several guests including Regina Alcover (his mother), Mauricio y Palo de Agua, Pelo Madueño and Antonio Cartagena, among others, clothed in this emotional Gianmarco concert. The concert ended with a rendition of "Hoy" ("Today"), which ended with a mix of "huaynos". Grandes Éxitos (Greatest Hits), was released in 2006, by Phantom Records only in Peruvian territory. This album focuses at Gian Marco's fifth album Al Quinto Día (The Fifth Day), and also highlight the best songs of his other works. Also that year, he recorded the song for the animated film Dragones: Destino de fuego (Dragons: Destiny of Fire), where is the performer of the soundtrack, also titled "Destino de fuego".

On 17 November 2006, Gian Marco releases 8, which includes ten unreleased tracks and features the first single in Peruvian territory, a song titled "No Te Avisa" ("It Doesn't Warn You"), for the rest of the world, the first single was "¿Qué Pasa?" ("What's Up?"), a song in which Gian Marco foray into the rap and gives its followers a somewhat different sound than they normally are used to hear. The album 20 Years, was made to celebrate 20 years of artistic life. There are 20 songs, 18 of which are re-recorded, and two unreleased songs "Invisible" and "In another Life". The song "Invisible" was composed by Gian Marco and Amaury Gutierrez. In 2012 he was awarded in Mexico a Quadruple Platinum Certification by his label for selling over 400,000 copies of his albums in Latin America since the beginning of his career as an independent artist in 2006. Later that year he won his third Latin Grammy.

=== Artistry ===
The singer has been making public the Latin American market as a composer, and also has written songs for Marc Anthony ("Este Loco Que Te Mira", "Hasta Que Vuelvas Conmigo", "Caminaré"), Pandora ("Mientras Tanto"), Jon Secada ("Amanecer", "Si No Fuera Por Ti"), Jaci Velasquez ("Bendito Amor"), Obie Bermúdez ("Me Cansé de Ti", "El Recuerdo"), Emmanuel ("En Otra Vida"), Alejandro Fernández ("Canta Corazón", "Tengo Ganas", "Dame Un Minuto", "No Se Me Hace Fácil"), and Gloria Estefan ("Hoy", "Tu Fotografía", "Mientras Tanto"), Luis Enrique ("Parte de este Juego"), among others. Gian Marco has been important brand image as Pepsi, Inca Kola, currently one of the leading companies in mobile telephony in Peru Claro. He is recognized as one of the best songwriters in Peruvian history as well as one of the artists that puts Peruvian music on the international map by several media including Billboard Magazine.

== Awards and nominations ==
Year	Work	Award	Category	Outcome
2002	A Tiempo	Latin Grammy Award	Best Male Pop Vocal Album	Nominated
2002	Gian Marco	Latin Grammy Award	Best New Artist	Nominated
2002	"Se Me Olvidó"	Latin Grammy Award	Record of the Year	Nominated
2004	"Hoy"	Latin Grammy Award	Best Tropical Song	Nominated
2005	Resucitar	Latin Grammy Award	Best Singer-Songwriter Album	Won
2008	Desde Adentro	Latin Grammy Award	Best Male Pop Vocal Album	Nominated
2008	Desde Adentro	Latin Grammy Award	Song of the Year	Nominated
2008	Gian Marco	Premios APDAYC	Best Pop Rock Artist of the Year	Nominated
2009	Gian Marco en Vivo desde el Lunario	Latin Grammy Award	Best Long Form Music Video	Nominated
2011	Días Nuevos	Latin Grammy Award	Best Singer-Songwriter Album	Won
2012	20 Años	Latin Grammy Award	Best Singer-Songwriter Album	Won
2012	"Invisible"	Latin Grammy Award	Song of the Year	Nominated
2013	Versiones	Latin Grammy Award	Album of the Year	Nominated
2013	Lo Mejor Que Hay En Mi Vida	Latin Grammy Award	Album of the Year (as recording engineer)	Nominated
2015	#Libre	Latin Grammy Award	Best Singer-Songwriter Album	Nominated
2015	Vida de mi Vida	Latin Grammy Award	Song of the Year	Nominated
2019	Intuición	Latin Grammy Award	Best Singer-Songwriter Album	Nominated
2024	Aun me sigo Encontrando	Latin Grammy Award	Best Traditional Pop Vocal Album	Nominated
2024	Aun me sigo Encontrando	Latin Grammy Award	Song of the Year	Nominated

== Discography ==
=== Historias (1990) ===
1. Canción de Amor
2. Domitila
3. Te Extrañaré
4. Ojalá No Sea Tarde
5. Dame un Beso
6. Mírame
7. Dos Historias
8. Avísame
9. Somos Dos
10. ¿Cuántas Horas Más?
11. Dejame Soñar Contigo
12. Libres
13. Corazón Solitario
14. Shubi Duwa
15. No Hieras Mi Corazón

=== Personal (1992) ===
1. Dame un Beso
2. Te Extrañaré
3. Libres
4. Shubi Duwa
5. ¿Cuántas Horas Más?
6. Negrita
7. No Hieras Mi Corazón
8. Canción de Amor
9. Dos Historias
10. Te Estoy Buscando
11. Somos Dos

=== Entre la Arena y la Luna (1994) ===
1. No Puedo Amarte
2. Gorrión
3. Quédate
4. ¿Dónde Estarás?
5. Parte de Este Juego
6. Cuando Quiero Amarte
7. Corazón de Cartón
8. Tómate el Tiempo Que Quieras
9. Ya Tienes Dueño

=== Señora, Cuénteme (1996) ===
1. La Flor de la Canela
2. Caricia
3. Camarón (El Gallo de Oro)
4. Extravío
5. Jamás Impedirás
6. Jarana
7. Gracia
8. Señora, Cuénteme
9. Secreto
10. Cuando Llora Mi Guitarra
11. El Plebeyo
12. Ojos Azules (feat. Mercedes Sosa)
13. Viva el Perú y Sereno
14. Corazón
15. Shadia

=== Al Quinto Día (1997) ===
1. Si Estuvieras Aquí
2. Verano o Primavera en Abril
3. Mírame
4. Sé Que Piensas en Mi
5. Muero Por Ti
6. Fragilidad
7. Corazón en la Ciudad
8. Déjame Amarte
9. Funky Aha

=== A Tiempo (Edicion Colombia) (2002) ===
1. Se Me Olvidó
2. Al Otro Lado de la Luna
3. Su Encanto en Mi
4. Te Mentiría
5. Por Ti
6. Lamento
7. Simplemente Espiritual
8. No Logro Entender
9. Retrato
10. Mujer
11. Ave María
12. Volveré
13. Sentirme Vivo
14. Se Me Olvidó (Versión Salsa)
15. Se Me Olvidó (Versión Dance)

=== Resucitar (2004) ===
1. Gota de Lluvia
2. Después de Mi
3. Resucitar
4. Sortearme en Tu Suerte
5. Sin Querer
6. Flor de Arena
7. Si Me Vuelvo a Enamorar
8. Lejos de Ti
9. En Cada Recuerdo
10. Soy
11. Ayer
12. Tú y Yo

=== Grandes Éxitos (2006) ===
1. Sé Que Piensas en Mi
2. Fragilidad
3. Mírame
4. Sin Querer
5. Se Me Olvidó
6. Resucitar
7. Lamento
8. Lejos de Ti
9. Si Estuvieras Aquí
10. Gota de Lluvia
11. Al Otro Lado de la luna
12. Corazón en la Ciudad
13. Después de Mi
14. Te Mentiría

=== 8 (2006) ===
1. El Amor Es Un Juego
2. Dibújame el Camino
3. Cuando Tú No Estás
4. Quiero Saber
5. Sin Permiso
6. ¿Qué Pasa?
7. No Te Avisa
8. Loco
9. Nunca Más Te Ví
10. Vientos del Sur

=== Desde Adentro (2008) ===
1. Canta Corazón
2. Hasta Que Vuelvas Conmigo
3. Hasta Que la Vida Pase
4. Tu Fotografía
5. Mientras Tanto
6. Tengo Ganas
7. Me Cansé de Ti
8. Parte de Este Juego
9. Sentirme Vivo
10. Todavía
11. Hoy
12. Lamento

=== En Vivo Desde El Lunario (2009) ===
1. Vientos del Sur
2. Hoy
3. Canta Corazón
4. Hasta Que la Vida Pase
5. Mientras Tanto
6. Me Cansé de Ti
7. Lamento
8. Se Me Olvidó
9. Gota de Lluvia
10. Tu Fotografía
11. Todavía
12. Hasta Que Vuelvas Conmigo
13. Quiero Saber
14. Lejos de Ti
15. Retrato
16. Sin Querer
17. Sentirme Vivo

=== En Tiempo Real DVD (2010) ===
1. Dime donde
2. Ando por la visavida
3. Amores imperfectos
4. De paseo
5. Desde hace un mes
6. En venta
7. Expreso 2222
8. Ojos azule/Adiós pueblo de Ayacucho/Valicha
9. Roxanne
10. Imagina
11. Sentirme vivo

=== Días Nuevos (2011) ===
1. Cuéntame
2. Más Allá
3. Respirar (ft. Alejandro Sanz)
4. Desde Hace Un Mes
5. De Paseo
6. Dime Dónde (ft. Juan Luis Guerra)
7. Amores Imperfectos
8. Sabes Que Cuentas Conmigo (ft. Diego Torres)
9. En Venta
10. Si Me Tenías
11. Días Nuevos

=== 20 Años (2012) ===
1. Canción de Amor
2. No Puedo Amarte
3. Parte de Este Juego
4. Invisible
5. Sé Que Piensas en Mí
6. Fragilidad
7. Sentirme Vivo
8. Se Me Olvidó
9. Te Mentiría
10. Retrato
11. Lamento
12. Resucitar
13. Lejos de Ti
14. Al Otro Lado de la Luna
15. Hoy
16. En Otra Vida
17. Hasta Que Vuelvas Conmigo
18. Canta Corazón
19. Dime Donde
20. Días Nuevos

=== Versiones (2013) ===
1. Cartas Amarillas
2. Almohada
3. Capullito de Aleli
4. Amor de Mis Amores
5. Come Fly with Me
6. Perfidia
7. La Flor de la Canela
8. Domitila
9. Ella
10. Corcovado
11. Tal para Cual
12. La Vida Nos Espera
13. Si No Fuera por Ti
14. Rabo de Nube

=== #Libre(2015) ===
1. Aunque ya no vuelva a verte
2. Mis Cicatrices
3. Vida de mi Vida
4. La Vida Entera
5. Tengo el Alma Perdida
6. Tan Fuerte
7. Siempre Tú
8. El Amor Que Te Tuve
9. Quiéreme
10. Tu Mejor Amigo

=== Intuición (2018) ===
1. Más de Lo Que Yo Te Quiero
2. Tú No Te Imaginas
3. Me Gusta mi Soledad
4. Bésame
5. Lo Que Nunca Fui con Nadie
6. Nadie Más que Tú
7. Sácala a Bailar
8. Empecemos a Vivir
9. Nada Cambia
10. Cómo Decirte Que No
11. Tú No Te Imaginas – Bachata Version

=== Mandarina (2021) ===
1. "No Va a Ser Fácil"
2. "Mandarina"
3. "Pasa"
4. "Empezar de Nuevo"
5. "Prefiero Vivir Sin Ti"
6. "Asi Soy Yo"
7. "Espejismo"
8. "Quédate Hasta Que Amanezca"
9. "En Tu Maleta"
10. "Calma En Mi"
11. "Empezar De Nuevo" (Remix)

=== Aún Me Sigo Encontrando (2024) ===
1. "Aún Me Sigo Encontrando" (with Ruben Blades)
2. "Contigo Hasta el Final" (with Mike Bahía)
3. "Ojos Que No Ven" (with Leonel García)
4. "Solitos" (with Andrés Cepeda)
5. "Todo Va a Estar Bien"
6. "María"
7. "Tú" (with Catalina García)
8. "Dicen en Mi Barrio" (with Luis Enrique and Gusi)
9. "No Es Amor" (with Daniela Darcourt)
10. "Los Sueños de Tu Vida" (with Silvio Rodríguez)
11. "No Es Amor" (Acoustic Version)

=== Bajo la Manga (2026) ===
1. Contigo Puedo Ser
2. Me Fui con Ella
3. Nunca Más
4. Deja Que Te Rompa el Corazón
5. Me Quedo
6. Dime Qué Más
7. Si Me Tenías

== Charts ==
=== Weekly charts ===
Song	Chart	Peak position
"Lamento" - En Vivo Desde el Lunario	US Hot Latin Songs (Billboard)	38
"Se me olvidó" - En Vivo Desde el Lunario	US Hot Latin Songs (Billboard)	39
"Lamento" - En Vivo Desde el Lunario	US Latin Pop Airplay (Billboard)	38
"Se me olvidó" - En Vivo Desde el Lunario	US Latin Pop Airplay (Billboard)	39
"Resucitar" - Resucitar	US Latin Pop Songs (Billboard)	25
"Lamento" - En Vivo Desde el Lunario	US Latin Pop Songs (Billboard)	27
"Se me olvidó" - En Vivo Desde el Lunario	US Latin Pop Songs (Billboard)	26
