= Regina Alcóver =

Peruvian singer and actress (born 1948)

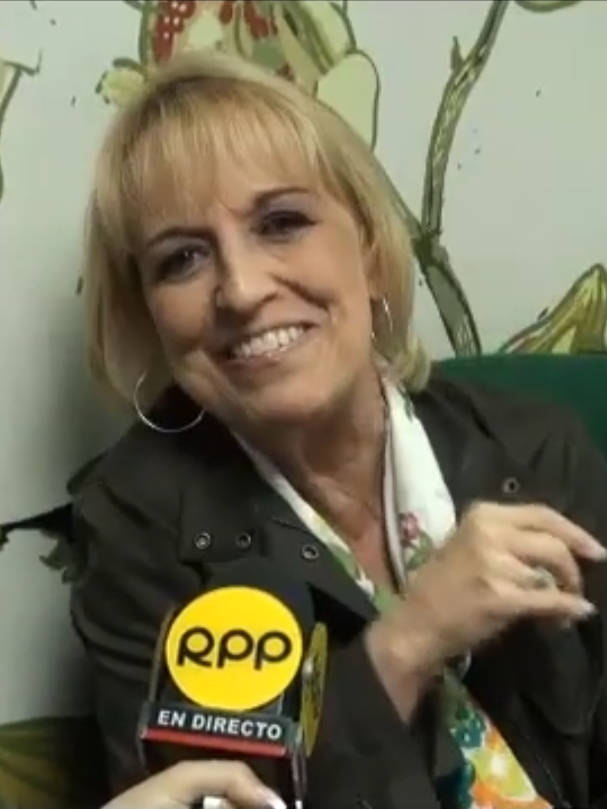
- Alcóver in 2012
- Born: María Regina Alcóver Ureta; 29 September 1948 (age 77); Lima, Peru
- Occupations: Singer; actress; radio presenter
- Years active: 1960s–present
- Spouse: Joe Danova (m. 1967; div. 1975)
- Children: Gian Marco
- Musical career
- Instrument: Vocals
- Years active: 1960s–1970s
- Labels: Lider; Karibe; Iempsa; Ibersound; Pentagrama Producciones Musicales S.A.; Odeon; Odeon del Perú

María Regina Alcóver Ureta (Spanish pronunciation: [reˈxina alˈkoβeɾ]; born 29 September 1948) is Peruvian singer and actress who had hits in the Latin charts during the 1960s. In recent years, she has worked as a radio host.

== Background ==
María Alcóver was born in 1948 in Lima, Peru. She is married to singer Joe Danova and is the mother of Gian Marco, also a musician.

== Career ==
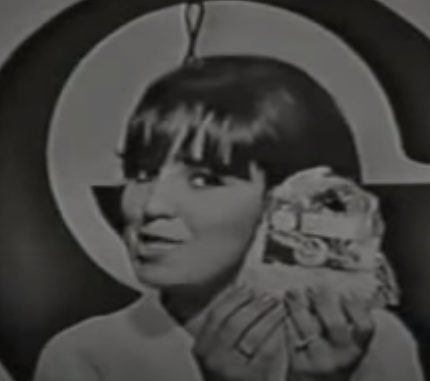
Alcóver in 1967

For the week of 16 July 1966, Regina Alcóver's single, "En un flor" was at no. 3 in the Peru Top Ten of the Billboard Hits of the World chart. The following week, it was at no. 2. Her single, "Nadie me puede esperar" was at no. 6 in the same chart. In 1966–67, Regina Alcóver's Regina album was released on Lider LD 1514.

It was reported by Record World in the 5 October 1968 issue that Regina Alcóver would be representing Peru in the Festival of Latin Song that was to be held in Mexico. It was reported in the 9 November 1968 issue of Record World that record label, Ibersound would release her album that week and it had sales potential.

In 1974, Alcóver and her husband Joe Danova recorded the song "Me haces sentir como nuevo" ("You Make Me Feel Brand New") in Spanish language. It was a winner in the 1974 Ancon Festival of Song. The song was released on the Iempsa label.

In the 1970s, Alcóver was also one of Latin America's top soap opera and telenovela actresses.

In 1980, she represented Peru in the OTI Festival with the song "Un buen motivo para amar".
