= Wrapped (Gloria Estefan song) =

Single by Gloria Estefan

from the album Unwrapped
- Released: August 15, 2003
- Genre: Tropipop
- Length: 3:27
- Label: Epic
- Songwriter: Gian Marco

Gloria Estefan singles chronology
"Y-Tu-Conga" (2002)	"Wrapped" (2003)	"I Wish You" (2003)

"Wrapped" is a song written by the Peruvian singer and songwriter Gian Marco and sung by Gloria Estefan, released as the first single from her tenth studio album Unwrapped. The single returned commercial success to Gloria, having charted in various countries.

== Song history ==
"Wrapped" ("Hoy" in Spanish) became a major hit for Gloria and signified her return to prominence in the charts, as the song was successful in both its English and Spanish versions. This single is Gloria's highest-charting song in Switzerland, reaching the Top 3 and it was certified Gold for its strong sales. Gloria also debuted in Belgium within the Ultratip Top 10.

The video, which is the same as the Spanish version of the song, "Hoy", was filmed in Peru in the legendary city Machu Picchu.

This single became the first single Gloria released as a Digital Download, and the Spanish version topped the Downloads charts in Spain. The single was not released commercially in the United States, but the single was available as a single to download at the iTunes music store.

This single become in one of the most successful Spanish singles ever released on her entire career, being a complete success on the charts, especially in Latin America. The song was a chart-topper on the United States Hot Latin Tracks for four non-consecutive weeks; it also topped the charts on another five countries all of them from Latin America. It remains as one of the most successful singles ever for Gloria in Argentina in which it was at the number one spot for five weeks..

"Hoy" and the lyrics for this song were written by Gian Marco Zignago, a Peruvian songwriter and singer.

Due to the success of the song in the Spanish version, the song was added to the setlist in a Salsa remix for the Estefan's 2004 Live & Re-Wrapped Tour, aside the original version in English. Both songs were included on the setlist. "Hoy" was a winner of an International Latin Billboard Music Awards for "Top Pop Airplay Track-Female of the Year" and was also nominated for a "Top Tropical Airplay Track of the Year".

The song is also featured in "On Your Feet," a Broadway musical about the life of Emilio and Gloria Estefan.

A rerecorded version of "Hoy" was included in Estefan's 2020 album Brazil305.

== "Wrapped" formats and track listings ==
U.S. Promo CD Single (ESK 41356) [September 2003]
No.	Title	Writer(s)	Length
1.	"Wrapped"	Gloria M. Estefan & Gian Marco	3:27

U.S. Advanced Promo CD-R (AEK-A01316) [July 23, 2003]
No.	Title	Writer(s)	Length
1.	"Wrapped" (Pablo Flores Remix Radio Edit)	Gloria M. Estefan & Gian Marco	3:59
2.	"Hoy" (Pablo Flores Remix Radio Edit)	Gian Marco	3:59
3.	"Wrapped" (Pablo Flores Remix)	Gloria M. Estefan & Gian Marco	8:21
4.	"Hoy" (Pablo Flores Remix)	Gian Marco	8:20
5.	"Hoy" (Salsa Mix)	Gian Marco	3:27

Europe CD Single #1 (EPC 674283 1) [September 15, 2003]
No.	Title	Writer(s)	Length
1.	"Wrapped"	Gloria M. Estefan & Gian Marco	3:27
2.	"Wrapped" (Tracy Young Remix)	Gloria M. Estefan & Gian Marco	3:47

Europe CD Single #2 (EPC 674283 9) [September 15, 2003]
No.	Title	Writer(s)	Length
1.	"Wrapped"	Gloria M. Estefan & Gian Marco	3:27
2.	"Hoy"	Gian Marco	3:27

Europe CD-Maxi Single #1 (EPC 674283 2) [September 15, 2003]
No.	Title	Writer(s)	Length
1.	"Wrapped"	Gloria M. Estefan & Gian Marco	3:27
2.	"Wrapped" (Pablo Flores Remix)	Gloria M. Estefan & Gian Marco	3:56
3.	"Hoy" (Salsa Mix)	Gian Marco	4:24
4.	"Wrapped" (Tracy Young Remix)	Gloria M. Estefan & Gian Marco	3:47
5.	"Wrapped" (Music Video (CD-ROM))	Gloria M. Estefan & Gian Marco	3:27

Europe CD-Maxi Single #2 (EPC 674283 5) [September 15, 2003]
No.	Title	Writer(s)	Length
1.	"Wrapped"	Gloria M. Estefan & Gian Marco	3:27
2.	"Wrapped" (Pablo Flores Remix)	Gloria M. Estefan & Gian Marco	3:56
3.	"Hoy" (Spanish Album Version)	Gian Marco	3:27
4.	"Wrapped" (Tracy Young Remix)	Gloria M. Estefan & Gian Marco	3:47
5.	"Wrapped" (Music Video (CD-ROM))	Gloria M. Estefan & Gian Marco	3:27

Europe Promo CD Single (SAMPCS 13327 1) [September 2003]
No.	Title	Writer(s)	Length
1.	"Wrapped"	Gloria M. Estefan & Gian Marco	3:27
2.	"Hoy"	Gian Marco	3:27

U.K. CD-Maxi Single #1 (674347 2) [September 15, 2003] {Cancelled/Unreleased}
No.	Title	Writer(s)	Length
1.	"Wrapped"	Gloria M. Estefan & Gian Marco	3:27
2.	"Wrapped" (Pablo Flores Remix)	Gloria M. Estefan & Gian Marco	3:56
3.	"Wrapped" (Tracy Young Remix)	Gloria M. Estefan & Gian Marco	3:47
4.	"Hoy" (Salsa Mix)	Gian Marco	4:24
5.	"Wrapped" (Music Video (CD-ROM))	Gloria M. Estefan & Gian Marco	3:27

U.K. CD-Maxi Single #1 (674347 2) [September 15, 2003] {Cancelled/Unreleased}
No.	Title	Writer(s)	Length
1.	"Wrapped"	Gloria M. Estefan & Gian Marco	3:27
2.	"Don't Wanna Lose You"	Gloria Estefan
3.	"Can't Stay Away From You"	Gloria Estefan

U.K. Promo CD Single (XPCD 2867) [September 2003]
No.	Title	Writer(s)	Length
1.	"Wrapped"	Gloria M. Estefan & Gian Marco	3:27

U.K. Promo CDR Single (No Catalog Number)
No.	Title	Writer(s)	Length
1.	"Wrapped" (Tracy Young Club Version)	Gloria M. Estefan & Gian Marco
2.	"Hoy" (Tracy Young Club Version)	Gian Marco
3.	"Wrapped" (("In Your Arms") (Dub))	Gloria M. Estefan & Gian Marco
4.	"Wrapped" (Tracy Young Remix)	Gloria M. Estefan & Gian Marco
5.	"Hoy" (Tracy Young Remix)	Gian Marco
6.	"Wrapped" (Tracy Young Acapella Version)	Gloria M. Estefan & Gian Marco
7.	"Hoy" (Tracy Young Acapella Version)	Gian Marco
8.	"Wrapped" (Pablo Flores Mix)	Gloria M. Estefan & Gian Marco
9.	"Hoy" (Pablo Flores Mix)	Gian Marco
10.	"Wrapped" (Pablo Flores Remix)	Gloria M. Estefan & Gian Marco
11.	"Hoy" (Pablo Flores Remix)	Gian Marco
13.	"Wrapped"	Gloria M. Estefan & Gian Marco
14.	"Hoy"	Gian Marco

Brazil Promo CD Single (2 900261) [September 2003]
No.	Title	Writer(s)	Length
1.	"Wrapped"	Gloria M. Estefan & Gian Marco	3:27

Australia Promo CD Single (SAMP 2588) [September 2003]
No.	Title	Writer(s)	Length
1.	"Wrapped"	Gloria M. Estefan & Gian Marco	3:27
2.	"Wrapped" (Pablo Flores Remix)	Gloria M. Estefan & Gian Marco	3:56

== "Hoy" formats and track listings ==
U.S. Promo CD Single #1 (ESK 56448) [September 2003]
No.	Title	Writer(s)	Length
1.	"Hoy"	Gian Marco	3:27
2.	"Hoy" (Salsa Mix)	Gian Marco	4:24
3.	"Hoy" (Pablo Flores Remix Radio Edit)	Gian Marco	3:56
4.	"Hoy" (Pablo Flores Remix)	Gian Marco	8:17

U.S. Promo CD Single #2 (ESK 57056) [September 2003]
No.	Title	Writer(s)	Length
1.	"Hoy"	Gian Marco	3:27
2.	"Wrapped"	Gloria M. Estefan & Gian Marco	3:27

Europe CD Single (EPC 674284 1) [September 8, 2003]
No.	Title	Writer(s)	Length
1.	"Hoy" (Spanish Album Version)	Gian Marco	3:27
2.	"Wrapped" (Album Version)	Gloria M. Estefan & Gian Marco	3:27

Europe CD-Maxi Single #1 (EPC 674284 2) [September 8, 2003]
No.	Title	Writer(s)	Length
1.	"Hoy" (Spanish Album Version)	Gian Marco	3:27
2.	"Hoy" (Pablo Flores Remix Full Mix)	Gian Marco	8:17
3.	"Hoy" (Salsa Mix)	Gian Marco	4:24
4.	"Hoy" (Tracy Young Club Version)	Gian Marco	9:23
5.	"Hoy" (Music Video (CD-ROM))	Gian Marco	3:27

Europe CD-Maxi Single #1 (EPC 674284 2) [September 8, 2003]
No.	Title	Writer(s)	Length
1.	"Hoy" (Spanish Album Version)	Gian Marco	3:27
2.	"Hoy" (Pablo Flores Remix Full Mix)	Gian Marco	8:17
3.	"Hoy" (Salsa Mix)	Gian Marco	4:24
4.	"Hoy" (Tracy Young Club Version)	Gian Marco	9:23
5.	"Wrapped" (Album Version)	Gloria M. Estefan & Gian Marco	3:27
6.	"Hoy" (Music Video (CD-ROM))	Gian Marco	3:27

Europe Promo CD Single (SAMPCS 13210 1) [September 2003]
No.	Title	Writer(s)	Length
1.	"Hoy" (Spanish Album Version)	Gian Marco	3:27
2.	"Wrapped" (Album Version)	Gloria M. Estefan & Gian Marco	3:27

Europe Promo CD Single (SAMPCS 13197 1) [September 2003]
No.	Title	Writer(s)	Length
1.	"Hoy" (Spanish Album Version)	Gian Marco	3:27

Mexico Promo CD Single (PRCD 98943) [September 2003]
No.	Title	Writer(s)	Length
1.	"Hoy"	Gian Marco	3:27
2.	"Wrapped"	Gloria M. Estefan & Gian Marco	3:27

Argentina Promo CD Single (DEP 780) [September 2003]
No.	Title	Writer(s)	Length
1.	"Hoy"	Gian Marco	3:27
2.	"Wrapped"	Gloria M. Estefan & Gian Marco	3:27

== Release history ==
Region	Date
United States (Wrapped)	August 15, 2003
Europe (Hoy)	September 8, 2003
Europe (Wrapped)	September 15, 2003

== Charts ==
=== Weekly charts ===
"Wrapped"

Chart (2003)	Peak position
US Bubbling Under Hot 100 (Billboard)	10
US Adult Contemporary (Billboard)	23
Belgium (Ultratip Bubbling Under Flanders)	4
Belgium (Ultratop 50 Wallonia)	26
Brazil	58
Portugal	8
Germany (GfK)	65
Japan (Tokyo)	41
Switzerland (Schweizer Hitparade)	3

"Hoy"

Chart (2003–2004)	Peak position
US Hot Latin Songs (Billboard)	1
US Latin Airplay (Billboard)	2
US Tropical Airplay (Billboard)	1
Colombia	7
Costa Rica	1
Europe Top 100	29
Guatemala	1
Honduras	1
Italy (FIMI)	21
Mexico	1
Nicaragua	1
Panama	1
Peru	1
Romanian Top 100	11
Spain (PROMUSICAE)	3
Spain (Top Downloaded Singles)	3

=== Year-end charts ===
"Wrapped"

Chart (2003)	Position
Switzerland (Schweizer Hitparade)	14
Chart (2004)	Position
Switzerland (Schweizer Hitparade)	80

== Certifications ==
Country	Certification	Sales
Argentina	4× Platinum	80,000
Mexico	Platinum	140,000
Spain	Platinum	60,000
Paraguay	Gold	5,000
Peru	6× Platinum	320,000
Switzerland	Platinum	30,000

== Official Versions ==
WRAPPED

Original Versions

1. Album Version — 3:27

Pablo Flores Remixes

1. Pablo Flores Full Remix — 8:17
2. Pablo Flores Remix — 3:56
3. Pablo Flores Rewrapped Mix — 4:14

Tracy Young Remixes

1. Tracy Young Club Version — 9:23
2. Tracy Young Remix — 3:47
3. Tracy Young "In Yours Arms" Mix — 7:03
4. Tracy Young "In Yours Arms" Dub — 9:26
5. Tracy Young Acapella Version

HOY

Original Versions

1. Spanish Album Version — 3:27
2. Salsa Mix — 4:25
3. Brazil305 Version — 3:34

Pablo Flores Remixes

1. Pablo Flores Full Remix — 8:17
2. Pablo Flores Remix — 3:56

Tracy Young Remixes

1. Tracy Young Club Version — 9:23
2. Tracy Young Remix — 3:47
3. Tracy Young Acapella Version

== Cover versions ==
- Israeli Singer Roni Dalumi released a cover of this song as her first single under the title "Ten" ('Give'). Her version was released in March 2010 and became her first hit single.
- Singer Gian Marco Zignago Peruvian musician covered the song in his album Desde dentro. Gian Marco is the co-writer of the English version with Gloria Estefan.
- Singer Raquel Olmedo also a Cuban / Mexican actress covered the song in her album Con el alma en cueros, released in 2009.
- Spanish singer India Martínez covered the song in her album Otras verdades, released in 2012.
- Argentine singer Valentino Merlo and Uruguayan musician the La Planta covered "Hoy" which reached #1 in Argentina in 2024.
