= Tu Fotografía =

Single by Gloria Estefan

from the album Unwrapped
- Released: April 2004 (Argentina, United States)
- Recorded: 2002
- Genre: Latin pop
- Length: 3:50
- Label: Epic
- Songwriters: Emilio Estefan, Jr.; Gian Marco

Gloria Estefan singles chronology
"Te Amaré" (2004)	"Tu Fotografía" (2004)	"Dr. Pressure" (2005)

"Tu Fotografía" (Your Picture) is the fifth and final single released by Gloria Estefan from her tenth studio album Unwrapped. The single was released as promotional CD singles to radio stations at U.S. and Argentina. The song was written by Peruvian singer-composer Gian Marco.

== "Your Picture" and "Tu Fotografía" ==
Though Gloria always used to change the meaning of the songs in her translations, this one was of the few exceptions, as noted in the song's name. The song talks about memories and the feelings made by only seeing a simple everyday picture.

The song was especially dedicated to the parents of Gloria's husband Emilio Estefan Jr. The people featured in the photograph in the single cover are Emilio Estefan Jr's parents.

The song was performed live at the Billboard Latin Music Awards, where she received a standing ovation for her performance.

== Charts ==
Tu Fotografía

"Tu Fotografía" became Gloria's twelfth number one song on the Billboard Hot Latin Tracks chart.

Chart (2004)	Peak position	Ref
U.S. Billboard Hot Latin Tracks	1	
U.S. Billboard Latin Pop Airplay	7	
U.S. Billboard Latin Tropical/Salsa Airplay	3	
World Latin Top 30 Singles	1	

Your Picture

Chart (2004)	Peak position	Ref
U.S. Billboard Bubbling Under Hot 100 Singles	25	

== Song Awards ==
Latin Billboard Music Awards

Year	Winner	Category	Ref
2005	Tu Fotografía	Tropical Airplay Track of the Year	
