= Lamento =

2003 song by Gian Marco

Single by Gian Marco

from the album A Tiempo
- Released: 2003
- Genre: Latin pop
- Length: 3:58
- Label: Sony Music Latin, Crescent Moon Records
- Songwriter: Gian Marco Zignago
- Producer: Sebastián Krys

Gian Marco singles chronology
"Te Mentiría" (2003)	"Lamento" (2003)	"Sentirme Vivo" (2003)

Music video
- "Lamento" on YouTube

"Lamento" (English: "Lament") is a song by the Peruvian singer-songwriter Gian Marco, released by Sony Music Latin and Crescent Moon Records in 2003 as the third single of his sixth studio album A Tiempo.

== Background and release ==
The song is a slow pop ballad which to help one forget about one's ex-lover and recover from a heartbreak. Billboard magazine described the song as "intensely intimate". It has become a major hit in Gian Marco's career and is considered to be one of his signature songs.

== Commercial performance ==
The song had airplay success throughout Latin America, Spain, and the U.S. Latin radio stations. It peaked at #38 on the Billboard Hot Latin Tracks chart and is his highest performing song. It was a good follow-up success to the album's first two singles, "Se Me Olvidó" and "Te Mentiría". It also reached number 38 on the Los Principales radio airplay chart in Spain on May 3, 2003. It is Gian Marco's highest performing of two songs on the U.S. Latin Airplay chart.

== Live performances ==
Marco performed the song on every one of his tours. During his 2012 concert to celebrate his 20-year music career, he performed it with his special guest, Manuel Mijares.

== Music video ==
The music video for the song shows Marco walking through the streets singing it while carrying and occasionally playing his guitar.

== Charts ==
Chart (2003)	Peak position
US Hot Latin Songs (Billboard)	38
US Latin Pop Airplay (Billboard)	27
