= Se Me Olvidó =

Single by Gian Marco

from the album A Tiempo
- Released: March 23, 2002
- Genre: Latin Pop
- Length: 4:13
- Label: Sony Music Latin, Crescent Moon Records
- Songwriter: Gian Marco Zignago
- Producer: Emilio Estefan

Gian Marco singles chronology
"El Ultimo Adios (The Last Goodbye)" (2001)	"Se Me Olvidó" (2002)	"Te Mentiría" (2003)

Music video
- "Se Me Olvidó" on YouTube

Se Me Olvidó (English: "I Forgot") is a song by Peruvian singer-songwriter Gian Marco released by Sony Music Latin and Crescent Moon Records in early 2002 as the lead single of his sixth studio album A Tiempo. It was his first single to be released Internationally.

== Release and reception ==
The song was released in early 2002 on mainstream radio and CD single. The song is a pop ballad that starts off slow and then the beat goes up in the chorus. It is defined as a song to help you forget about your ex and get over a heartbreak. Since its release it has become a major hit in Gian Marco's career and it's considered one of his signature songs. A dance version and a salsa version of the song were also included in the album. Due to the success of the song and the album, Billboard named Gian Marco one of the Hot Newcomers To Watch.

== Commercial performance ==
The song was a success throughout Latin America, the U.S., and parts of Europe reaching the top spots on the charts. The success of the song helped spread his fame making him the most famous Peruvian artist at the moment. It launched Gian Marco's career internationally becoming his first song to enter the U.S. Billboard charts making him the first, and currently only, Peruvian artist to reach the U.S. Billboard Hot Latin Songs chart. It was Gian Marco's first song to enter the U.S. Latin Airplay chart. The song also reached number six on the Los Principales radio airplay chart in Spain on October 26, 2002, and the fourth spot on the country's general airplay chart. The song was nominated for Record of the Year at the Latin Grammy Awards in 2002. The song was also included in the Latin Grammy's CD that same year.

== Music video ==
The music video for the song shows Gian Marco sitting on a window ledge in his apartment playing his guitar while writing the song. He then goes walking around town singing the song.

== Charts ==
=== Weekly charts ===
Chart (2002)	Peak position
Spain (AFYVE)	4
US Hot Latin Songs (Billboard)	39
US Latin Pop Airplay (Billboard)	26
US Tropical Airplay (Billboard)	31

=== Year-end charts ===
Chart (2002)	Position
Spain (AFYVE)	46

== Accolades ==
Latin Grammy Awards

Year	Nominee / work	Award	Result
2002	3rd Latin Grammy Awards	Record of the Year	Nominated
