= Unión Peruana de Productores Fonográficos =

Peruvian music industry trade association

- Abbreviation: UNIMPRO
- Formation: July 19, 2001
- Type: Technical standards, licensing and royalties
- Legal status: Association
- Purpose: Trade organization protecting music production companies' interests
- Headquarters: San Isidro District, Lima
- Location: Peru
- Leader: Director Francisco Samillán
- Affiliations: IFPI
- Website: www.unimpro.org

The Unión Peruana de Productores Fonográficos (UNIMPRO) (English: Peruvian Union of Phonograph Producers) is a non-profit organization and industry trade group integrated by multinational and national record companies in Peru composed of various Peruvian corporations involved in the music industry. It was founded in 2001 and it serves as the affiliate member of the International Federation of the Phonographic Industry (IFPI) in the country since 2012 and also serves as the national ISRC agency. It is one of the three collective societies in Perú along with Asociación Peruana de Autores y Compositores (APDAYC) and Sociedad Nacional de Intérpretes y Ejecutantes de la Música (SONIEM).

== History ==
UNIMPRO is a collective management society that represents the cultural music industry in Perú and for this it has a technical, professional and highly specialized organization. It is constituted as a non-profit association, its members are natural or legal people and represent the intellectual property rights of the most important labels of national and international record companies and independent phonographic producers. It was founded on July 19, 2001, and its existence was published in the official gazette, El Peruano, on August 1, 2001. They are the second Peruvian music organization certified with SGS after Asociación Peruana de Autores y Compositores (APDAYC) which has been around since 1952.

In 2010, UNIMPRO Francisco Samillán reported that in Perú there are more than 300 independent music producers and each one charges up to 20,000 nuevos soles per month for the reproduction of their recordings. That was a big difference from 2005 when the number of national independent producers didn't even pass ten.

In May 2021, they worked with INDECOPI in blocking 17 illegal websites that allowed downloading of works under the form of stream-ripping and the transmission of sporting events via streaming after being notified by La Comisión de Derecho de Autor del Indecopi (CDA).

== Music charts ==
=== Airplay charts ===
UNIMPRO has calculated monthly a Top 20 Airplay charts for both radio and TV independently since their founding and in alliance with BMAT Music Innovation since 2014.

The monthly charts are private and not open to the public without subscription, but some archives from as early as 2009 are found on their official website. Other archives of the monthly charts can be found within their monthly newsletters and on wayback machine.

They also have published yearly airplay charts but only the ones from 2016 and 2017 is available to the public online.

=== Digital charts ===
UNIMPRO also calculates the Digital Top 1000 chart but only five archives from 2021 are available online.

== Music recording certification ==
UNIMPRO is the organization awarding music recording certifications in Perú. Originally, only albums were certified, with certification levels of 5,000 for Gold album and 10,000 for Platinum. By 2007 the levels were lowered to 3,000 and 6,000 respectively which lasted at least until June 2013.

Format	Thresholds		
Format	Gold	Platinum	Notes
Album	3,000	6,000	Since January 2007
Album	5,000	10,000	Until December 2006

In the 2010 annual report by IFPI, it was reported that around 200,000 albums were sold in Peru, which was a 35.3% increase in unit sales from the previous year. That was a big surprise mostly because earlier that same year it was reported that Perú was the second country in South America to lose the most money due to piracy only behind Brazil. Still, overall this represents a decline of over 96% in sales volume from the year 2000, when over 5,000,000 CD's were sold in Peru through legitimate channels.

One year later, the album Días Nuevos by Gian Marco was the first to be awarded a record 5× Platinum certification and became the best-selling album of 2011 in Peru with 50,000 copies sold.

== See also ==
- Monitor Latino
