= KC and the Sunshine Band discography =

- Studio albums: 15
- Live albums: 2
- Compilation albums: 12
- Singles: 58
- Music videos: 9

The following is the discography of American disco and funk band KC and the Sunshine Band.

== Albums ==
=== Studio albums ===
Year	Album	Peak chart positions						Certifications	Record label
Year	Album	US	US R&B	AUS	CAN	NLD	UK	Certifications	Record label
1974	Do It Good	—	—	—	—	—	—		TK
1975	KC and the Sunshine Band	4	1	7	5	5	26	ARIA: Gold; MC: Platinum	TK
1975	The Sound of Sunshine	131	24	—	—	—	—		TK
1976	Part 3	13	5	15	13	—	—	MC: Platinum	TK
1978	Who Do Ya (Love)	36	25	64	36	—	—		TK
1979	Do You Wanna Go Party	50	19	83	60	—	—		TK
1981	Space Cadet Solo Flight	—	—	—	—	—	—		TK
1981	The Painter	—	—	—	—	—	—		Epic
1982	All in a Night's Work	—	—	38	—	44	46		Epic
1983	KC Ten	93	—	—	—	—	—		Meca
1993	Oh Yeah!	—	—	—	—	—	—		ZYX
2001	I'll Be There for You	—	—	—	—	—	—		Sunshine Sound
2007	Yummy	—	—	—	—	—	—		Sunshine Sound
2015	Feeling You! The 60's	—	—	—	—	—	—		BFD
2015	A Sunshine Christmas	—	—	—	—	—	—		BFD
"—" denotes a recording that did not chart or was not released in that territory.

=== Live albums ===
- Get Down Live! (1995, Intersound)
- Live: Get Down Tonight (1998, EMI-Capitol) Rehashed and shortened to 10 Tracks rerelease of the 1995 Get Down Live! release.

=== Compilation albums ===
Year	Album	Peak chart positions					Certifications	Record label
Year	Album	US	US R&B	AUS	NZ	UK	Certifications	Record label
1980	Greatest Hits	132	62	3	3	10	ARIA: Platinum; BPI: Silver; RMNZ: Gold	TK
1983	That's the Way I Like It	—	—	54	—	—		K-tel
1990	The Best of KC and the Sunshine Band	—	—	—	—	—	RIAA: Gold; BPI: Silver	Rhino
1990	Greatest Hits	—	—	—	—	—		Hollywood
1990	Greatest Hits, Vol. 2	—	—	—	—	—		Hollywood
1994	The Best of KC and the Sunshine Band: Special Edition	—	—	—	—	—		Rhino
1997	I'm Your Boogie Man and Other Hits	—	—	—	—	—		Rhino
1997	Shake, Shake, Shake and Other Hits	—	—	—	—	—		Rhino
1998	The Very Best Of	—	—	—	—	82	BPI: Gold	EMI
1999	25th Anniversary Collection	—	—	—	—	—		Rhino
2001	VH1 Behind the Music: The KC and the Sunshine Band Collection	—	—	—	—	—		Rhino
2002	The Essentials	—	—	—	—	—		Warner Music
2005	In a Mellow Mood	—	—	—	—	—		Sunshine Sound
2009	The TK Years	—	—	—	—	—		EMI
2011	Flashback with KC & The Sunshine Band	—	33	—	—	—		Rhino
2019	An Introduction to: KC & the Sunshine Band	—	—	—	—	—		Rhino
"—" denotes a recording that did not chart or was not released in that territory.

== Singles ==
Year	Single	Peak chart positions										Certifications	Album
Year	Single	US	US R&B	US Dan	US A/C	AUS	CAN	IRE	NLD	NZ	UK	Certifications	Album
1973	"Blow Your Whistle"	—	27	—	—	—	—	—	—	—	—		Do It Good
1974	"Queen of Clubs"	66	25	—	—	—	65	—	9	—	7		Do It Good
1974	"Sound Your Funky Horn"	—	21	—	—	—	—	—	—	—	17		Do It Good
1975	"I'm a Pushover"	—	57	—	—	—	—	—	—	—	—		Do It Good
1975	"Get Down Tonight"	1	1	11	—	44	1	—	5	—	21	RIAA: Platinum; ARIA: Gold; MC: Gold; RMNZ: Gold	KC and the Sunshine Band
1975	"Shotgun Shuffle"	88	25	—	—	—	85	—	—	—	—		The Sound of Sunshine
1975	"That's the Way (I Like It)"	1	1	18	—	5	1	17	1	12	4	RIAA: Gold; ARIA: Gold; MC: Platinum; RMNZ: Gold	KC and the Sunshine Band
1975	"I'm So Crazy ('Bout You)"	—	—	—	—	—	—	—	—	—	34		KC and the Sunshine Band
1976	"Rock Your Baby"	—	70	—	—	—	—	—	—	—	—		The Sound of Sunshine
1976	"(Shake, Shake, Shake) Shake Your Booty"	1	1	9	—	16	1	—	6	7	22	RIAA: Gold; MC: Gold	Part 3
1976	"I Like to Do It"	37	4	9	—	—	60	—	—	31	—		Part 3
1977	"I'm Your Boogie Man"	1	3	9	—	38	1	—	6	12	41	RIAA: Gold; MC: Gold	Part 3
1977	"Keep It Comin' Love"	2	1	9	36	28	1	—	8	19	31	MC: Gold	Part 3
1977	"Wrap Your Arms Around Me"	48	24	9	—	—	—	—	—	—	—		Part 3
1978	"Boogie Shoes"	35	29	—	—	33	30	—	—	31	34	RIAA: Platinum; ARIA: Gold; RMNZ: Platinum	KC and the Sunshine Band
1978	"Black Water Gold"	—	75	28	—	—	—	—	—	—	—		—N/a
1978	"It's the Same Old Song"	35	30	—	—	38	36	—	—	—	47		Who Do Ya (Love)
1978	"Do You Feel All Right"	63	62	—	—	—	—	—	—	—	—		Who Do Ya (Love)
1978	"Who Do Ya Love"	68	88	—	—	—	—	—	—	—	—		Who Do Ya (Love)
1979	"I Will Love You Tomorrow"	—	—	—	—	—	—	—	33	—	—		Who Do Ya (Love)
1979	"Do You Wanna Go Party"	50	8	—	—	—	87	—	—	—	—		Do You Wanna Go Party
1979	"Come to My Island"	—	—	—	—	—	—	—	11	—	—		Who Do Ya (Love)
1979	"Please Don't Go"	1	—	—	27	1	1	5	7	3	3	BPI: Silver	Do You Wanna Go Party
1979	"I Betcha Didn't Know That"	—	25	—	—	—	—	—	—	—	—		Do You Wanna Go Party
1979	"Yes, I'm Ready" (with Teri DeSario)	2	20	—	1	30	10	—	21	8	—		Moonlight Madness
1980	"Dancin' in the Streets" (with Teri DeSario)	66	—	—	—	—	—	—	—	—	—		Moonlight Madness
1980	"Let's Go Rock and Roll"	—	—	—	—	—	—	—	28	—	—		Greatest Hits
1980	"Por Favor No Te Vayas"	—	—	—	—	—	—	—	—	—	—		—N/a
1980	"Make Me a Star"	—	—	—	—	—	—	—	—	—	—		Space Cadet: Solo Flight
1980	"Space Cadet"	—	—	—	—	—	—	—	—	—	—		Space Cadet: Solo Flight
1981	"I Don't Wanna Make Love"	—	—	—	—	—	—	—	—	—	—		Space Cadet: Solo Flight
1981	"Love Me"/"Sway"	—	—	—	—	—	—	—	—	—	—		The Painter
1981	"It Happens Every Night"	—	—	—	—	—	—	—	—	—	—		The Painter
1982	"(You Said) You'd Gimme Some More"	—	—	9	—	45	—	24	—	—	41		All in a Night's Work
1982	"Don't Run (Come Back to Me)" (with Teri DeSario)	—	—	—	12	—	—	—	—	—	—		All in a Night's Work
1983	"Give It Up"	18	—	24	—	3	43	1	8	4	1	ARIA: Gold; BPI: Platinum; RMNZ: 2× Platinum	All in a Night's Work / KC Ten
1983	"Something's Happening"	—	—	—	—	—	—	—	39	—	—		The Painter
1983	"It's the Same Old Song" (re-release)	—	—	—	—	—	—	—	—	—	99		Who Do Ya (Love)
1984	"Are You Ready"	102	—	—	—	—	—	—	—	—	—		KC Ten
1984	"On the Top"	—	—	—	—	—	—	—	—	—	—		KC Ten
1991	"Game of Love"	—	—	—	—	—	—	—	—	—	—		Nobody's Perfect
1991	"That's the Way (I Like It)" (The Re Mastermix)	—	—	—	—	—	—	—	—	—	59		—N/a
1992	"Please Don't Go" ('92 House Remix Version)	—	—	—	—	—	—	—	—	—	—	ARIA: Gold	—N/a
1993	"Megamix (The Official Bootleg)"	—	—	—	—	—	—	—	—	—	—		Oh Yeah!
1993	"Will You Love Me in the Morning"	—	—	—	—	—	—	—	—	—	—		Oh Yeah!
1994	"Get Down and Boogie (Megamix)"	—	—	—	—	98	—	—	—	—	—		—N/a
1998	"2 Live Party" (with 2 Live Crew and Freak Nasty)	—	52	—	—	—	—	—	—	—	—		—N/a
2001	"I'll Be There for You"	—	—	—	—	—	—	—	—	—	—		I'll Be There for You
2001	"All That Good Stuff"	—	—	—	—	—	—	—	—	—	—		I'll Be There for You
2001	"Higher Love"	—	—	—	—	—	—	—	—	—	—		I'll Be There for You
2015	"I Love You More"	—	—	30	—	—	—	—	—	—	—		—N/a
2016	"I'm Feeling You" (featuring Bimbo Jones)	—	—	11	—	—	—	—	—	—	—		—N/a
2016	"We Belong Together"	—	—	29	—	—	—	—	—	—	—		—N/a
2017	"Movin' Your Body"	—	—	38	—	—	—	—	—	—	—		—N/a
2019	"Give Me Some More (Aye Yai Yai)" (with Tony Moran featuring Nile Rodgers)	—	—	12	—	—	—	—	—	—	—		—N/a
2020	"Put a Little Love in Your Heart"	—	—	—	—	—	—	—	—	—	—		—N/a
2021	"Romantica"	—	—	—	—	—	—	—	—	—	—		—N/a
2022	"Unconditional Love" (featuring Bimbo Jones)	—	—	—	—	—	—	—	—	—	—		—N/a
"—" denotes a recording that did not chart or was not released in that territory.

== Music videos ==
Year	Title	Album
1975	"That's the Way (I Like It)"	KC and the Sunshine Band
1976	"(Shake, Shake, Shake) Shake Your Booty"	Part 3
1977	"I'm Your Boogie Man"	Part 3
1977	"Keep It Comin' Love"	Part 3
1979	"Please Don't Go"	Do You Wanna Go Party
1983	"Give It Up"	All in a Night's Work / KC Ten
1993	"20th Anniversary Megamix"	Oh Yeah!
2020	"Put a Little Love in Your Heart"	non-album
2021	"Romantica"	non-album
