= The Best of KC and the Sunshine Band =

Compilation album by KC and the Sunshine Band
- Released: June 12, 1990
- Genres: R&B, soul, disco
- Length: 55:11
- Label: Rhino

KC and the Sunshine Band chronology
KC Ten (1983)	The Best of KC and the Sunshine Band (1990)	Oh Yeah! (1993)

Professional ratings
Review scores
Source	Rating
AllMusic	4.5/5 stars
Robert Christgau	A−
Select	4/5 medals

The Best of KC and the Sunshine Band is a compilation album by KC and the Sunshine Band, released in 1990. The album contained hits from 1974 to 1979, including every track included in their 1980 Greatest Hits compilation (which had gone out of print), along with their top 20 1983 hit "Give It Up" and other moderately successful singles.

== Track listing ==
1. "Sound Your Funky Horn" – 3:05
2. "Get Down Tonight" – 3:12
3. "I'm Your Boogie Man" – 4:03
4. "(Shake, Shake, Shake) Shake Your Booty" – 3:06
5. "Queen of Clubs" – 3:17
6. "That's the Way (I Like It)" – 3:06
7. "Keep It Comin' Love" – 3:52
8. "Please Don't Go" – 3:48
9. "Boogie Shoes" – 2:12
10. "Let's Go Rock and Roll" – 3:34
11. "Give It Up" - 4:05
12. "Do You Wanna Go Party" – 3:47
13. "I Like to Do It" – 2:55
14. "Shotgun Shuffle" – 2:48
15. "Wrap Your Arms Around Me" – 3:42
16. "All I Want" – 4:28

== Personnel ==
- Harry Wayne Casey – keyboards, vocal
- Jerome Smith – guitar
- Richard Finch – bass guitar, drums, percussion
- Robert Johnson – drums
- Oliver Brown – percussion
- Fermin Goytisolo – percussion
- Ken Faulk – trumpet
- Vinnie Tanno – trumpet
- Mike Lewis – tenor saxophone
- Whit Sidener – baritone saxophone
- Beverly Champion – background vocals
- Margaret Reynolds – background vocals
- Jeanette Williams – background vocals

== Charts ==
Chart performance for The Best of KC and the Sunshine Band
Chart (2023)	Peak position
Hungarian Physical Albums (MAHASZ)	25

== Certifications ==
Certifications for The Best of KC and the Sunshine Band
Region	Certification	Certified units/sales
United Kingdom (BPI)	Silver	60,000^{‡}
^{‡} Sales+streaming figures based on certification alone.
