= 25th Anniversary Collection (KC and the Sunshine Band album) =

Compilation album by KC and the Sunshine Band
- Released: 1999
- Genre: Disco
- Length: 113:54
- Label: Rhino

KC and the Sunshine Band chronology
Get Down Live! (1995)	25th Anniversary Collection (1999)	I'll Be There for You (2001)

25th Anniversary Collection is a compilation album by KC and the Sunshine Band, released in 1999. It is the most comprehensive KC and the Sunshine Band collection to date, containing nearly every single released during the band 1970s heyday, along with a small sampling of later tracks.

== Track listing ==
=== Disc one ===
No.	Title	Length
1.	"Get Down Tonight" (Original Single Version)	3:12
2.	"That's the Way (I Like It)" (Original Single Version)	3:05
3.	"Blow Your Whistle"	2:32
4.	"Sound Your Funky Horn"	3:04
5.	"Queen of Clubs"	3:17
6.	"I'm a Pushover"	3:05
7.	"Shotgun Shuffle"	2:45
8.	"I'm So Crazy" ('Bout You)	3:07
9.	"Rock Your Baby" (Single Mix)	3:52
10.	"(Shake, Shake, Shake) Shake Your Booty"	3:06
11.	"Boogie Shoes"	2:11
12.	"I Like to Do It"	2:56
13.	"I'm Your Boogie Man"	4:03
14.	"Wrap Your Arms Around Me"	3:44
15.	"Black Water Gold"	3:11
16.	"I Get Lifted"	3:04

=== Disc two ===
No.	Title	Length
1.	"Keep It Comin' Love"	3:52
2.	"It's the Same Old Song"	3:25
3.	"Do You Feel Alright" (Single Edit)	2:42
4.	"Who Do Ya Love"	3:46
5.	"Do You Wanna Go Party"	7:33
6.	"Please Don't Go"	3:51
7.	"I Betcha Didn't Know That"	4:09
8.	"Yes, I'm Ready"	3:17
9.	"Let's Go Rock and Roll"	3:34
10.	"All I Want"	4:26
11.	"Dancin' in the Streets"	3:07
12.	"Give It Up"	4:05
13.	"Por Favor No Te Vayas (Please Don't Go)"	3:09
14.	"Please Don't Go '92" (USA Radio Edit)	3:50
15.	"Get Down Tonight" (A Tom Moulton Mix)	9:08

== Personnel ==
- Harry Wayne Casey – keyboards, vocals
- Jerome Smith – guitar
- Richard Finch – bass guitar, drums, percussion
- Robert Johnson – drums
- Oliver Brown – percussion
- Fermin Goytisolo – percussion
- Ken Faulk – trumpet
- Vinnie Tanno – trumpet
- Mike Lewis – tenor saxophone
- Whit Sidener – baritone saxophone
- Beverly Champion – background vocals
- Margaret Reynolds – background vocals
- Jeanette Williams – background vocals
