= Greatest Hits (KC and the Sunshine Band album) =

Compilation album by KC and the Sunshine Band
- Released: February 1980
- Genres: Disco, pop
- Length: 42:03
- Label: TK
- Producers: H. W. Casey, Richard Finch

KC and the Sunshine Band chronology
Do You Wanna Go Party (1979)	Greatest Hits (1980)	Space Cadet Solo Flight (1981)

Professional ratings
Review scores
Source	Rating
AllMusic	4.5/5 stars
Robert Christgau	A−

Greatest Hits is the first official compilation album by KC and the Sunshine Band. The album was released in February 1980 on the TK label.

== History ==
The album contained two newly recorded tracks, "All I Want" and "Let's Go Rock and Roll". The latter was released as a moderately successful single to promote the compilation.

== Track listing ==
All tracks are written by Harry Wayne Casey and Richard Finch.

Side one
No.	Title	Length
1.	"Sound Your Funky Horn"	2:59
2.	"Queen of Clubs"	3:17
3.	"Get Down Tonight"	5:15
4.	"Boogie Shoes"	2:16
5.	"That's the Way (I Like It)"	5:06
6.	"Shake Your Booty"	3:04

Side two
No.	Title	Length
7.	"I'm Your Boogie Man"	4:01
8.	"Keep It Comin' Love"	4:26
9.	"Please Don't Go"	3:43
10.	"Let's Go Rock and Roll"	3:36
11.	"All I Want"	4:20

== Personnel ==
- Harry Wayne Casey – keyboards, vocal
- Jerome Smith – guitar
- Richard Finch – bass guitar, drum, percussion
- Robert Johnson – drums
- Fermin Goytisolo – percussion

== Charts ==
Chart performance for Greatest Hits
Chart (1980)	Peak position
Australian Albums (Kent Music Report)	3
New Zealand Albums (RMNZ)	3
UK Albums (Official Charts)	10
US Billboard 200	132
US Top R&B/Hip-Hop Albums (Billboard)	62

== Certifications ==
Certifications for Greatest Hits
Region	Certification	Certified units/sales
Australia (ARIA)	Platinum	50,000^{^}
New Zealand (RMNZ)	Gold	7,500^{^}
United Kingdom (BPI)	Silver	60,000^{^}
^{^} Shipments figures based on certification alone.
