= Get Down Live! =

Live album by KC and the Sunshine Band
- Released: 1995
- Recorded: 1993–94
- Length: 73:15
- Label: Intersound
- Producer: H. W. Casey, Amaury López, Bobby Martinez

KC and the Sunshine Band chronology
Oh Yeah! (1993)	Get Down Live! (1995)	25th Anniversary Collection (1999)

Professional ratings
Review scores
Source	Rating
AllMusic	2/5 stars

Get Down Live! is the first live album by KC and the Sunshine Band, released in 1995.

It is a compilation of several shows that were recorded at/in Fountain Blue, Miami Beach, New Year's Eve '93/'94, Houston, Texas '94, Australia '94, Peru, South America '94, New York '94, Madison Square Garden, Atlanta, GA, '94.

The CD was rereleased in 2003 as Greatest Hits Live on the Varese Fontana label with ASIN B00009VTYU with an identical track listing, but different packing.

== Track listing ==
1. "Opening ("KC, KC, KC")" (A. Lopez, B. Martinez) – 0:20
2. "Give It Up" (H. W. Casey, D. Carter) – 3:53
3. "Shake Your Booty" (Casey, R. Finch) – 3:08
4. "James Brown Medley: Sex Machine/I Feel Good" (James Brown, Bobby Byrd, Ron Lenhoff) – 3:16
5. "Boogie Man Medley: I'm Your Boogie Man/Keep It Comin' Love/It's The Same Old Song" (Casey, Finch, Eddie Holland, Lamont Dozier, Brian Holland) – 4:57
6. "I Want to Take You Higher" (Sylvester Stewart) – 6:02
7. "Amazing Grace" (traditional) – 3:34
8. "Party" (Casey) – 3:59
9. "I Betcha Didn't Know That" (S. Dees, F. Knight) – 4:24
10. "Latin Funk" (Lopez, Martinez) – 1:57
11. "New Attitude" (B. Hull, S. Robinson, J. Gilutin) – 2:44
12. "Boogie Shoes" (Casey, Finch) – 3:28
13. "Please Don't Go" (Casey, Finch) – 10:35
14. "That's The Way (I Like It)" (Casey, Finch) – 5:38
15. "Get Down Tonight" (Casey, Finch) – 4:45
16. "Yes, I'm Ready" (B. Mason) – 3:07
17. "KC In The House" (Casey) – 7:45

== Personnel ==
- Harry Wayne Casey – vocals
- Amaury López – keyboards
- Ernest "Snuffy" Stewart – keyboards
- Manny López – guitar
- Rusty Taylor – bass
- Orlando Hernandez – drums
- Fofi Lancha – drums
- Efrin – drums
- Johnny Byrne – drums
- Fermin Goytisolo – percussion
- Eguie Castrillo – percussion
- Bobby Martinez – saxophone
- Tony Conception – trumpet
- Dana Teboe – trombone
- Beverly Champion Foster – background vocals
- Maria DeCrescenzo – background vocals
- Hialeah High School Chorus – choir
