= Part 3 (KC and the Sunshine Band album) =

Studio album by KC and the Sunshine Band
- Released: October 1, 1976
- Recorded: 1975−1976
- Genre: Disco
- Length: 28:44
- Label: TK
- Producers: H. W. Casey, Richard Finch

KC and the Sunshine Band chronology
| The Sound of Sunshine (1975) | Part 3 (1976) | Who Do Ya (Love) (1978) |

Singles from Part 3
- 1. "(Shake, Shake, Shake) Shake Your Booty" Released: 1976; 2. "I Like to Do It" Released: November 2, 1976; 3. "I'm Your Boogie Man" Released: 1977; 4. "Keep It Comin' Love" Released: 1977; 5. "Wrap Your Arms Around Me" Released: 1977

Professional ratings
Review scores
| Source | Rating |
|---|---|
| AllMusic | 4.5/5 stars |
| Christgau's Record Guide | B+ |

Part 3 is the fourth studio album by the funk and disco group KC and the Sunshine Band. The album was produced by Harry Wayne Casey and Richard Finch and was released in October 1976 on the TK label.

== History ==
Part 3 contains some of the band's biggest hits, "(Shake, Shake, Shake) Shake Your Booty", "I'm Your Boogie Man", and "Keep It Comin' Love". The first two reached number 1 on the Billboard Hot 100 while the third peaked at number two. Two other singles, "I Like to Do It" and "Wrap Your Arms Around Me" found moderate success on the charts.

The album reached number 5 on the Billboard Soul LPs chart and number 13 on the Billboard Top LPs & Tape chart.

Record World said of "I Like to Do It" that "What this group likes to do is race up the charts and as long as they continue to produce material such as this, they should remain on top."

The album was remastered in 1994 as “Part 3…And More” with additional bonus tracks by Rhino.

The album was remastered and reissued with bonus tracks in 2012 by Big Break Records.

== Track listing ==
All tracks are written by Harry Wayne Casey and Richard Finch.

Side one
| No. | Title | Length |
|---|---|---|
| 1. | "Baby I Love You (Yes, I Do)" | 4:43 |
| 2. | "Wrap Your Arms Around Me" | 3:47 |
| 3. | "I Like to Do It" | 2:57 |
| 4. | "(Shake, Shake, Shake) Shake Your Booty" | 3:06 |

Side two
| No. | Title | Length |
|---|---|---|
| 5. | "Let's Go Party" | 2:57 |
| 6. | "Come on In" | 3:25 |
| 7. | "I'm Your Boogie Man" | 4:05 |
| 8. | "Keep It Comin' Love" | 4:23 |

Part 3…And More 1994 remastered CD bonus tracks
| No. | Title | Length |
|---|---|---|
| 9. | "Por Favor No Te Veyas (Please Don’t Go)" | 3:09 |
| 10. | "Make Me A Star - KC" | 3:37 |
| 11. | "Do Me - KC" | 3:38 |
| 12. | "Space Cadet - KC" | 4:09 |
| 13. | "Red Light - KC" | 4:20 |
| 14. | "I Don’t Wanna Make Love - KC" | 3:54 |
| 15. | "Fire In Your Eyes" | 3:52 |
| 16. | "Get Down Tonight (Tom Moulton Mix)" | 9:08 |

2012 remastered reissue bonus tracks
| No. | Title | Length |
|---|---|---|
| 17. | "I'm Your Boogie Man" (Single Version) | 4:00 |
| 18. | "Keep It Comin' Love" (Single Version) | 3:51 |

== Personnel ==
- Harry Wayne Casey – keyboards, vocal
- Jerome Smith – guitar
- Richard Finch – bass guitar, drums, percussion
- Robert Johnson – drums
- Fermin Goytisolo – percussion
- Oliver C. Brown – percussion
- Ken Faulk – trumpet
- Vinnie Tanno – trumpet
- Mike Lewis – tenor saxophone
- Whit Sidener – baritone saxophone
- Beverly Champion – background vocals
- Margaret Reynolds – background vocals
- Jeanette Williams – background vocals
