= The Sound of Sunshine =

Studio album by The Sunshine Band
- Released: September 1975
- Genre: Disco
- Length: 26:27
- Label: TK
- Producer: H. W. Casey, Richard Finch

The Sunshine Band chronology
KC and the Sunshine Band (1975)	The Sound of Sunshine (1975)	Part 3 (1976)

Professional ratings
Review scores
Source	Rating
AllMusic	3/5 stars
Christgau's Record Guide	D+

The Sound of Sunshine is the third studio album by the American funk and disco group the Sunshine Band. The album was produced by its vocalist Harry Wayne Casey, who did not perform vocals for the album, and Richard Finch. It was released in September 1975 on the TK label.

== History ==
The Sound of Sunshine, an instrumental album, was credited only to the Sunshine Band. Singer Harry Wayne Casey ("KC") did not perform on it as a vocalist, though he co-produced it with partner Richard Finch. The album features an instrumental version of "Rock Your Baby", which had been a hit for George McCrae in 1974.

== Track listing ==
All tracks are written by Harry Wayne Casey and Richard Finch, except where noted.

Side one
No.	Title	Writer(s)	Length
1.	"Shotgun Shuffle"		2:45
2.	"Rock Your Baby"		3:58
3.	"Funky '75"	Harry Wayne Casey, Richard Finch, Clarence Reid	2:55
4.	"S.O.S."		3:00
5.	"Miss B. (Theme)"		3:07

Side two
No.	Title	Length
6.	"Hey J"	2:39
7.	"Just a Groove"	3:06
8.	"Sunshine City"	2:16
9.	"I Love You"	2:36

== Personnel ==
- Harry Wayne Casey – keyboards, vocal
- Jerome Smith – guitar
- Richard Finch – bass guitar, drum, percussion
- Robert Johnson – drum
- Fermin Goytisolo – percussion
- Ken Faulk – trumpet
- Vinnie Tanno – trumpet
- Mike Lewis – tenor saxophone
- Whit Sidener – baritone saxophone
- Beverly Champion – background vocals
- Margaret Reynolds – background vocals
- Jeanette Williams – background vocals

Additional personnel

- Larry Warmoth – album photography
