= List of RPM number-one dance singles of 1976 =

These are the RPM magazine Dance number one hits of 1976.

== Chart history ==
Issue date	Song	Artist	Reference(s)
November 13, 1976	"Keep It Comin' Love / I'm Your Boogie Man"	KC and the Sunshine Band	
November 20, 1976	"Keep It Comin' Love / I'm Your Boogie Man"	KC and the Sunshine Band	
November 27, 1976	Four Seasons of Love (all cuts)	Donna Summer	
December 4, 1976	Four Seasons of Love (all cuts)	Donna Summer	
December 11, 1976	Four Seasons of Love (all cuts)	Donna Summer	
December 18, 1976	"Keep It Comin' Love / I'm Your Boogie Man"	KC and the Sunshine Band	
December 25, 1976	No Chart Published		

== See also ==
- List of RPM number-one dance singles chart (Canada)
