= Jerome Smith (musician) =

American musician

- Born: June 18, 1953; New York City, USA
- Died: July 28, 2000 (aged 47) Miami, Florida, USA
- Genres: Disco, pop, funk
- Occupation: Musician
- Instrument: Guitar
- Years active: 1973–2000
- Labels: TK Records, Sunshine Sound Records, Rhino
- Formerly of: KC and the Sunshine Band, Blowfly
- Website: kcsbonline.com

Jerome Smith (June 18, 1953 – July 28, 2000) was a guitarist at TK Records in Miami, Florida, who was a member of KC and the Sunshine Band from their inception in 1973 until his death in 2000.

His rhythm guitar playing was a key part of the band's propulsive disco sound, first gaining international attention on George McCrae's hit recording of "Rock Your Baby" (for T.K.) in 1974.

Smith's high-pitched, restless guitar solo on "Get Down Tonight", KC and the Sunshine Band's first US #1 single, resembled the sound of a synthesizer. It was achieved by speeding up the solo guitar track against a normal-speed rhythm guitar track in the studio.

With the group he recorded five No. 1 songs, including "That's the Way (I Like It)", "(Shake, Shake, Shake) Shake Your Booty" and "I'm Your Boogie Man".

He was also sought after as a session guitarist, playing on 10 albums by the disco burlesque artist Blowfly.

In the 1990s, he contributed to the soundtrack of the television series Melrose Place.

He died on July 28, 2000, aged 47, when he was crushed by a bulldozer in Miami where he worked as a construction worker.
