= In a Mellow Mood =

Compilation album by KC and the Sunshine Band
- Released: 2005
- Genres: Soul, R&B
- Length: 67:08
- Label: Sunshine Sound

KC and the Sunshine Band chronology
I'll Be There For You (2001)	In a Mellow Mood (2005)	Yummy (2007)

In a Mellow Mood is a collection of ballads by KC and the Sunshine Band, released in 2005. All but three of the tracks had been issued on prior albums. Two of the exceptions—"Remember" and "Love Disappears"—were said in the liner notes to come from the album Yummy, which had not yet been released in 2005. When Yummy was finally released in 2007, only "Love Disappears" was on the track list, making "Remember" unique to this collection. The liner notes further state that "I Can See Clearly Now" is from the 1995 collection Get Down Live!, but in fact it appears here for the first time.

== Track listing ==
1. "Are You Feeling Like Me" – 3:12
2. "Don't Let Go" – 4:38
3. "In My World" – 3:37
4. "I Betcha Didn't Know That" – 4:08
5. "All I Want" – 4:28
6. "I Can See Clearly Now" – 4:29
7. "When I Close My Eyes" – 4:14
8. "All I Really Want to Do" – 3:49
9. "I'll Be There for You" – 3:36
10. "I Can't Forget" – 3:43
11. "Please Don't Go (Live at Versilia)" – 3:13
12. "How About a Little Love" – 2:31
13. "So Glad" – 4:41
14. "Remember" – 5:26
15. "Love Disappears" – 3:43
16. "Please Don't Go" – 3:50
17. "Don't Run" – 3:20

== Performers ==
- Harry Wayne Casey – keyboard, vocals
