= Do It Good =

- original issue cover

Studio album by KC and the Sunshine Band
- Released: April 12, 1974
- Recorded: 1973
- Genre: Funk
- Length: 27:39
- Label: TK
- Producer: Richard Finch

KC and the Sunshine Band chronology
Do It Good (1974)	KC and the Sunshine Band (1975)

Professional ratings
Review scores
Source	Rating
AllMusic	3/5 stars
Christgau's Record Guide	B+

Do It Good is the debut album by the American funk and disco group KC and the Sunshine Band. Produced by Richard Finch, it was released in 1974 on the TK label.

== History ==
Do It Good had little mainstream impact in the United States, despite catchy tracks like "Sound Your Funky Horn". The album was focused towards upbeat funk, which would later turn into disco. The original working title for the album was Funkulous Homunculus.

After the song "Queen of Clubs" became a hit, the album was re-issued in 1978 with the title Queen of Clubs. The record had a new cover that featured a playing card with the Queen of Clubs on the front (the record label still gave the album title as Do It Good).

Record World said of "Queen of Clubs" that "the sound is fuller than on recent K.C. hits with an uptempo Motown feel."

The album was remastered and reissued with bonus tracks in 2012 by Big Break Records.

== Track listing ==
All tracks written by Harry Wayne Casey, except where indicated.

Side one
No.	Title	Writer(s)	Length
1.	"Do It Good"	Harry Wayne Casey, Betty Wright	2:25
2.	"Sound Your Funky Horn"	Casey, Clarence Reid	2:59
3.	"Baby I Want Your Lovin'"	Casey, Willie Clarke	3:30
4.	"Queen of Clubs"	Casey, Clarke	3:15
5.	"Blow Your Whistle"		2:35

Side two
No.	Title	Length
6.	"I'm a Pushover"	3:45
7.	"You Don't Know"	2:30
8.	"I Need a Little Lovin'"	2:25
9.	"All My Love"	4:25

2012 remastered reissue bonus tracks
No.	Title	Length
10.	"I'm Gonna Do Something Good to You"	2:34
11.	"Why Don't We Get Together"	4:28
12.	"Queen of Clubs" (Single Version)	3:00
13.	"I'm a Pushover" (Single Version)	3:03

== Personnel ==
- Harry Wayne Casey – keyboards, vocals
- Richard Finch – bass guitar, drums, percussion
- Jerome Smith – guitar
- Oliver Brown – percussion
- Fermin Goytisolo – percussion
- Ken Faulk – trumpet
- Vinnie Tanno – trumpet
- Mike Lewis – tenor saxophone
- Whit Sidener – baritone saxophone
- Beverly Champion – background vocals
- Margaret Reynolds – background vocals
- Jeanette Williams – background vocals

Guest musicians

- Jimmy "Bo" Horne – background vocals
- George McCrae – background vocals
- Gwen McCrae – background vocals
- Betty Wright – background vocals
