= 25th Anniversary Collection =

25th Anniversary Collection may refer to:

- 25th Anniversary Collection (KC and the Sunshine Band album), 1999
- The ★ Collection: 25th Anniversary Edition, by The Monkees, 1992
