= So Glad =

So Glad may refer to:

- "So Glad", a song by KC and the Sunshine Band from the album Who Do Ya (Love), 1978
- "So Glad", a song by Michelle Williams from the album Heart to Yours, 2002
