= KC Ten =

Studio album by KC
- Released: December 28, 1983
- Recorded: 1982–1983
- Genres: Funk, disco, R&B
- Length: 40:28
- Label: Meca
- Producers: H. W. Casey, Richard Finch, Robert Walker, Ron Taylor

KC chronology
All in a Night's Work (1982)	KC Ten (1983)	The Best of KC and the Sunshine Band (1990)

KC Ten is the second solo studio album by KC from the funk and disco group KC and the Sunshine Band. The album was produced by Harry Wayne Casey, Robert Walker, and Ron Taylor and was released in December 1983 on the Meca label.

== History ==
KC Ten was credited only to the group’s lead vocalist, KC. The album includes the hit song "Give It Up", which was also included in the previous album. The single reached the top twenty on the Billboard Hot 100, becoming their first and only number 1 single on the UK Singles Chart. The band disbanded after this album was released; and eight years would pass before the band regrouped.

== Track listing ==
Side one
No.	Title	Writer(s)	Length
1.	"Give It Up"	Harry Wayne Casey, Deborah Carter	4:03
2.	"Are You Ready?"	Casey, Richard Finch	3:03
3.	"On the Top"	Casey, Joseph Simmel, Robert Walker	3:42
4.	"Don't Break My Heart"	Casey, Hazel King	2:45
5.	"Nobody Knows"	Casey	3:39

Side two
No.	Title	Writer(s)	Length
6.	"Too High"	Casey, Walker	2:58
7.	"Don't Let Go"	Casey	4:36
8.	"In My World"	Casey	3:37
9.	"Let's Get Together" (Duet with Margaret Reynolds)	Casey, Phil Rodriguez, Carter	3:26
10.	"Thank You (Falettinme Be Mice Elf Agin)"	Sylvester Stewart	4:34

== Personnel ==
- Harry Wayne Casey – vocals, keyboards
- Emridge Jones – keyboards, saxophones
- Ellis Parker Jr. – keyboards
- Ron Taylor – keyboards
- James Magnole – guitars
- Jerome Smith – guitars
- George Terry – guitars
- Steve Argy – bass guitar
- Gary King – bass guitar
- Joe Galdo – drums
- Fermin Goytisolo – percussion
- Phil Rodriguez – percussion
- Ricky Webb – percussion
- Eugene Timmons – saxophones
- Ken Faulk – trumpets
- Deborah Carter – backing vocals
- Denise King – backing vocals
- Margaret Reynolds – backing vocals, vocals (9)
- Jeanette Williams – backing vocals
- Betty Wright – backing vocals

=== Production ===
- Harry Wayne Casey – producer, mixing
- Richard Finch – producer (1)
- Ron Taylor – producer (2-10), mixing
- Robert Walker – producer (2-10)
- Steve Kimball – engineer, mixing
- John Luongo – remixing (1)
- Mike McCarty – album cover design
- David Vance – photography
