= Little Beaver =

Little Beaver may refer to:

- Little Beaver, the Jicarilla Apache pal of Red Ryder
- Willie Hale, musician also known as "Little Beaver"
- Little Beaver (wrestler), Canadian professional wrestler
- Little Beaver Creek State Wild and Scenic River and National Scenic River, in Ohio
- Marcel Dionne, with the nickname of Little Beaver
- Theodore Cleaver's nickname in the TV series Leave It to Beaver
