= Boogie Shoes =

- 1978 Dutch single picture sleeve (also used for 1978 US vinyl single)

Single by KC and the Sunshine Band

from the album KC and the Sunshine Band / Saturday Night Fever
- B-side: "I Get Lifted"
- Released: January 1978
- Recorded: 1975
- Genre: Disco; funk
- Length: 2:17
- Label: TK
- Songwriters: Harry Wayne Casey; Richard Finch
- Producers: Harry Wayne Casey; Richard Finch

KC and the Sunshine Band singles chronology
"Keep It Comin' Love" (1977)	"Boogie Shoes" (1978)	"Black Water Gold" (1978)

Official audio
- "Boogie Shoes" (2004 remix) on YouTube

"Boogie Shoes" is a funk/disco song by KC and the Sunshine Band, which first appeared on their 1975 self-titled album. The song became a hit after it appeared on the Saturday Night Fever soundtrack in 1977. It was subsequently released as a single and peaked at number 35 on the Billboard Hot 100 and number 29 on the soul chart in 1978. Before its 1978 release as an A-side, the song was the B-side to the 1976 single "Shake Your Booty".

Structurally, it uses the sixteen-bar blues chord progression. As with several of KC's disco songs, some of the lyrics are playfully suggestive: "I want to do it till the sun comes up / I want to do it till I can't get enough."

In addition to Saturday Night Fever, the song is featured in numerous other films, including No Escape (1994), Mallrats (1995), Boogie Nights (1997), Detroit Rock City (1999), The Wedding Date (2005), Hop (2011),The Intern (2015), Knock at the Cabin (2023) as well as the television series Sports Night, Desperate Housewives (both, coincidentally, with star Felicity Huffman dancing to it), Flash Forward, and Pose.

The song peaked at number 34 on the UK Singles Chart in the week of 6 May 1978 and was on the chart for a total of five weeks.

== Covers and sampling ==
The song has been sampled by the Bloodhound Gang in the song "One Way", Trick Daddy in the song "Take It to da House", and Icandy in the song "Keep Dat". Alex Chilton covered "Boogie Shoes" on his 1979 album Like Flies on Sherbert. In 2012, the song was sung by Alex Newell (playing a transgender teen) in the Glee episode "Saturday Night Glee-ver".

== Personnel ==
- Harry Wayne Casey – keyboards, vocals
- Jerome Smith – guitar
- Richard Finch – bass guitar
- Robert Johnson – drums
- Oliver C. Brown – percussion
- Ken Faulk – trumpet
- Vinnie Tanno – trumpet
- Mike Lewis – tenor saxophone
- Whit Sidener – baritone saxophone
- Beverly Champion – background vocals
- Margaret Reynolds – background vocals
- Jeanette Williams – background vocals

== Certifications ==
Region	Certification	Certified units/sales
Australia (ARIA)	Gold	35,000^{‡}
New Zealand (RMNZ)	Platinum	30,000^{‡}
United States (RIAA)	2× Platinum	2,000,000^{‡}
^{‡} Sales+streaming figures based on certification alone.
