= Brendon (singer) =

British pop/folk rock singer

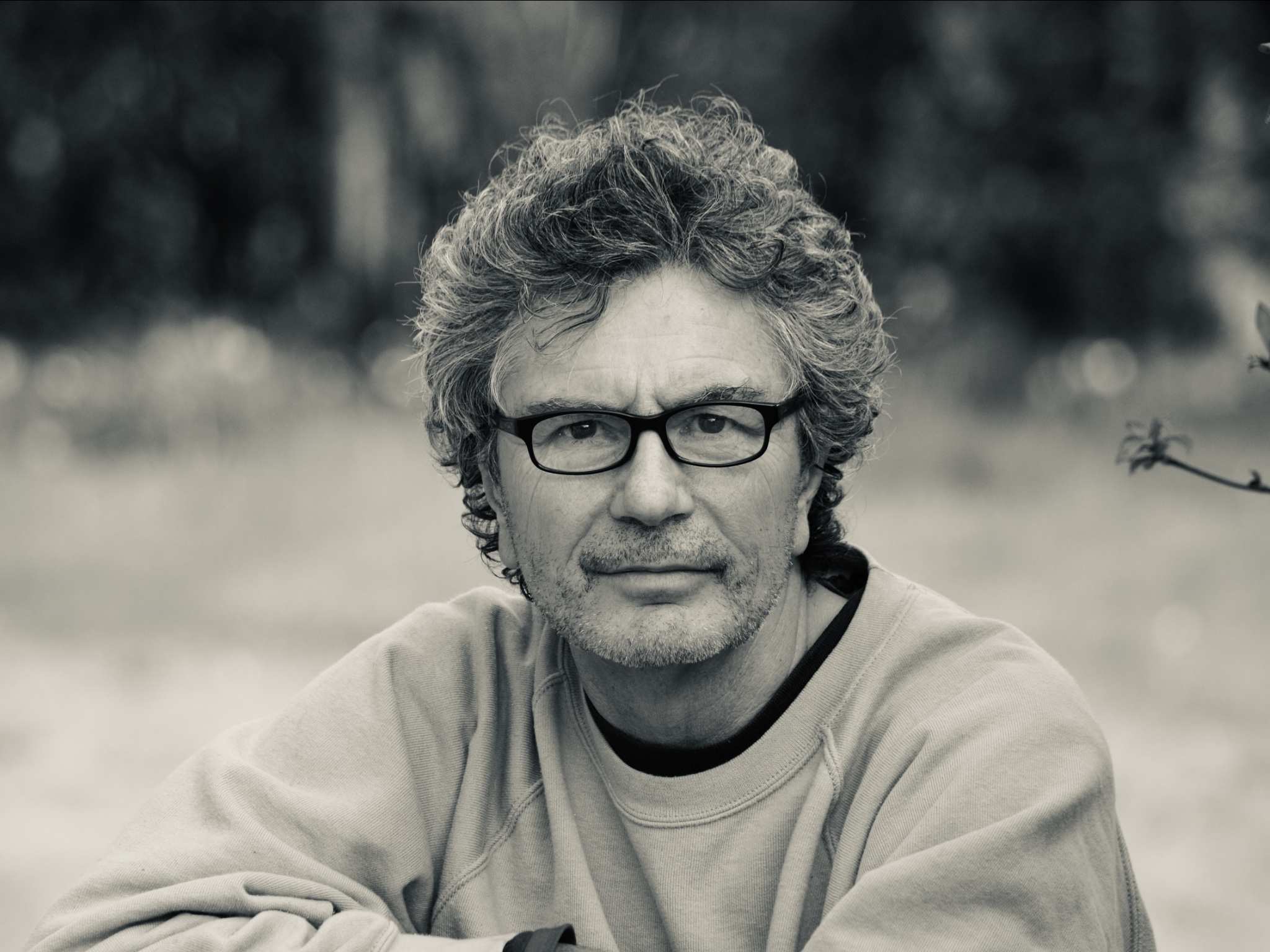

Brendon Dunning is a British pop/folk rock singer. He had releases on Ariola Records and Magnet Records in the mid 1970s. One of his singles, "Gimme Some", a cover version of a disco song recorded the previous year by Jimmy "Bo" Horne, hit the UK Singles Chart in 1977, peaking at number 14 in March of that year. The follow-up, a cover of ABBA's "Rock Me", failed to chart.

He recorded his first album titled Brendon in 1974 with U.K. Records. In 2009 Brendon and Dave Levy (former band member) released new material under the name of Simple Country Folk. Their album is titled Long Time Coming.

In 2020 Brendon announced his return to music and his folk rock roots with his latest album, Hold My Hand.

== See also ==
- List of one-hit wonders on the UK Singles Chart
- List of performances on Top of the Pops
