= Space Cadet Solo Flight =

Studio album by KC and the Sunshine Band
- Released: January 1981
- Genre: Pop
- Length: 43:30
- Label: TK
- Producers: H. W. Casey, Richard Finch

KC and the Sunshine Band chronology
Greatest Hits (1980)	Space Cadet Solo Flight (1981)	The Painter (1981)

Professional ratings
Review scores
Source	Rating
AllMusic	2/5 stars

Space Cadet Solo Flight is the first solo album by KC from the funk and disco group KC and the Sunshine Band. The album was produced by Harry Wayne Casey and Richard Finch and was released in 1981 on the TK label.

== History ==
Space Cadet Solo Flight was credited only to group lead vocalist KC. Featuring more of a pop sound than the previous group albums, it was not successful as the album and none of the singles released charted in the US. The album is notable for including a cover of the Supremes' 1966 hit song "You Keep Me Hangin' On".

== Track listing ==
Side one
No.	Title	Writer(s)	Length
1.	"Space Cadet"	Harry Wayne Casey, Richard Finch	4:10
2.	"Red Light"	Casey, Finch	4:07
3.	"I Ask Myself"	Casey, Finch	3:30
4.	"You Keep Me Hangin' On"	Holland–Dozier–Holland	4:30
5.	"Make Me a Star"	Casey, Bruce Roberts	3:35

Side two
No.	Title	Writer(s)	Length
6.	"I Don't Wanna Make Love"	Marc Gabriele, Madeline Stone, Norman Dolph	3:55
7.	"Nothing Sadder Than a Heartache"	Gabriele, Stone	3:24
8.	"What's Wrong?"	Gabriele, Stone, Dolph	2:54
9.	"Only Love"	Gabriele, Stone, Dolph	3:25
10.	"Holdin' on So Long"	Eddie Sierra, Jim Morgan, Dolph	2:58

== Personnel ==
- Harry Wayne Casey – vocals, keyboards, horn arrangements
- Lawrence Dermer – keyboards
- Paul Harris – keyboards
- Ernest Stewart – keyboards
- Timmy Thomas – keyboards
- Slick Aguilar – guitars
- Tony Battaglia – guitars
- Mark Gabriele – guitars
- Tommy Johnson – guitars
- Ishmael Ledesma – guitars
- Richard Finch – bass guitar, drums, percussion, string arrangements
- Emmanuel Taylor – bass guitar
- Joe Galdo – drums
- Robert Johnson – drums
- Omar Martinez – drums
- Mark Novotak – drums
- Fermin Goytisolo – percussion
- Whit Sidener – baritone saxophone
- Mike Lewis – tenor saxophone, horn arrangements, string arrangements
- Ken Faulk – trumpet
- Brett Murphy – trumpet
- Jerry Peel – French horn solo (5)
- Deborah Carter – backing vocals
- Beverly Champion – backing vocals
- Denise King – backing vocals

=== Production ===
- Harry Wayne Casey – producer
- Richard Finch – producer, engineer
- Milan Bogdan – engineer, mixing
- Rob Vaughn – art direction
- David Vance – photography
