= Do You Wanna Go Party =

Studio album by KC and the Sunshine Band
- Released: June 22, 1979
- Recorded: 1978
- Genre: Disco; funk
- Length: 33:03
- Label: TK
- Producer: H. W. Casey, Richard Finch

KC and the Sunshine Band chronology
Who Do Ya (Love) (1978)	Do You Wanna Go Party (1979)	Greatest Hits (1980)

Singles from Do You Wanna Go Party
- 1. "Do You Wanna Go Party"" Released: 1979; 2. "Please Don't Go"" Released: July 12, 1979

Professional ratings
Review scores
Source	Rating
AllMusic	3/5 stars
Christgau's Record Guide	B+
The Virgin Encyclopedia of R&B and Soul	2/5 stars

Do You Wanna Go Party is the sixth studio album by the funk and disco group KC and the Sunshine Band. The album was produced by Harry Wayne Casey and Richard Finch and was released in June 1979 on the TK label.

== History ==
Do You Wanna Go Party contains the group's last number one hit in the US, "Please Don't Go". The title track was a moderate hit, with more success on the R&B chart, reaching the top ten. The B-side to "Please Don't Go", "I Betcha Didn't Know That", was also a Top 20 R&B chart hit.

== Track listing ==
All tracks are written by Harry Wayne Casey and Richard Finch, except where noted.

No.	Title	Writer(s)	Length
1.	"Hooked On Your Love"		3:55
2.	"I've Got The Feeling"		3:05
3.	"Ooh, I Like It"		6:06
4.	"Please Don't Go"		3:50
5.	"I Betcha Didn't Know That"	Frederick Knight, Sam Dees	4:08
6.	"Que Pasa?"		5:10
7.	"Do You Wanna Go Party"		7:29

== Personnel ==
- Harry Wayne Casey – keyboards, vocal
- Jerome Smith – guitar
- Richard Finch – bass guitar, drum, percussion
- Robert Johnson – drum
- Fermin Goytisolo – percussion
- Ken Faulk – trumpet
- Vinnie Tanno – trumpet
- Jerry Peel – french horn
- Joe Singer – french horn
- Mike Lewis – tenor saxophone
- Whit Sidener – baritone saxophone
- Beverly Champion – background vocals
- Donna Rhodes – background vocals
- Althea Tate – background vocals

Guest musicians

- Manuel Capote – strings
- David Chappell – strings
- Bogdan Chruszcz – strings
- David Everhart – strings
- Marguerit Haldeman – strings
- Roslind Lang – strings
- Marjorie Lash – strings
- Stuart McDonald – strings
- Susan Oltman – strings
- Robert Phillips – strings
- Debra Spring – strings
- Guy Weddle – strings
- Valerie Vonpechy – harp
- Charles Chalmers – background vocals
- Sandra Chalmers – background vocals
- Teri DeSario – background vocals
