= The Painter (KC and the Sunshine Band album) =

Studio album by KC and the Sunshine Band
- Released: September 1981
- Studio: Sunshine Sound Enterprises (Miami, Florida)
- Genre: Pop, disco, funk, R&B
- Length: 37:51
- Label: Epic
- Producer: H. W. Casey, Richard Finch

KC and the Sunshine Band chronology
Space Cadet Solo Flight (1981)	The Painter (1981)	All in a Night's Work (1982)

Professional ratings
Review scores
Source	Rating
AllMusic	2/5 stars

The Painter is the eighth studio album by the funk and disco group KC and the Sunshine Band. Produced by Harry Wayne Casey and Richard Finch, it was released in September 1981 on the Epic label.

== History ==
The Painter, like its predecessor, was not successful, as the band turned to a more pop-focused music.

A notable track on this album is the ballad "All Through the Night". The song was co-written by Bruce Roberts and Donna Summer, and was first recorded by Summer for her 1979 album Bad Girls.

== Track listing ==
Side one
No.	Title	Writer(s)	Length
1.	"Stand Up"	Harry Wayne Casey	2:56
2.	"Don't Say No"	Casey, Felipe Rodriquez	4:12
3.	"It Happens Every Night"	Ronald Kalstein	4:21
4.	"Go Now (Before There's Trouble)"	John Keller, Geoff Lieb	3:02
5.	"The Painter"	Casey	3:10
6.	"Sway"	Dominic Bugatti, Frank Musker	2:56

Side two
No.	Title	Writer(s)	Length
7.	"Summer Nights"	Dan Walsh, Michael Price	3:18
8.	"Baby, I'm Yours"	Van McCoy	3:18
9.	"Love Me"	Casey, Richard Finch	3:24
10.	"All Through the Night"	Bruce Roberts, Donna Summer	4:35
11.	"Something's Happening"	Bugatti, Musker	3:36

== Personnel ==
- Harry Wayne Casey – lead vocals, backing vocals, keyboards, arrangements, horn arrangements
- Anthony Battaglia – keyboards, guitars, guitar solo (3), backing vocals, arrangements, horn arrangements, string arrangements
- Victor Paliuca – keyboards, synthesizers
- Ernest Stewart – keyboards
- Blue Weaver – keyboards, synthesizers
- Tommy Johnson – guitars
- Richard Finch – bass guitar, percussion, backing vocals, arrangements, horn arrangements
- Emmanuel Taylor – bass guitar
- Harold Seay – drums
- Fermin Goytisolo – percussion
- Jimmy "Bo" Horne – percussion
- Dan Bonsanti – saxophones
- Neil Bonsanti – saxophones
- Charles Chalmers – saxophones, sax solo (3, 5), backing vocals
- Mike Lewis – saxophones, horn arrangements
- Whit Sidener – saxophones
- Eugene Timmons – saxophones, sax solo (4)
- Michael Katz – trombone
- Stewart Brenner – trumpet
- Ken Faulk – trumpet
- Brett Murphy – trumpet
- Frederick Hughes Jr. – French horn
- Paul Harris – string arrangements, string conductor (3, 9, 10)
- Bob Basso – strings
- David Chappell – strings
- Bogdan Chruszcz – strings
- David Everhart – strings
- Marjorie Lash – strings
- Jose Montoto – strings
- Ignus Naruns – strings
- Alfredo Oliva – strings
- Jorge Orbon – strings
- Alexander Prilutchi – strings
- Debra Spring – strings
- Guy Weddle – strings
- Deborah Carter – backing vocals
- Beverly Champion – backing vocals
- Denise King – backing vocals
- Sandra Rhodes – backing vocals

=== Production ===
- Harry Wayne Casey – producer, mixing
- Richard Finch – producer, mixing
- Milan Bogdan – engineer, mixing
- Masterfonics (Nashville, Tennessee) – mastering location
- Guy Webster – photography
