= Oliver C. Brown =

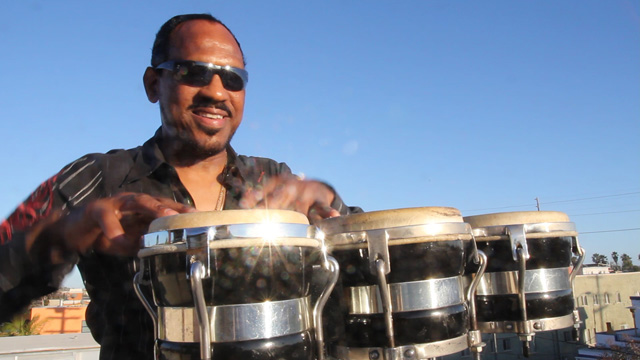
- Brown in Gravity 180 documentary

Background information
- Born: Oliver Charles Brown; December 1, 1946 (age 79); Berkeley, California, U.S.
- Genres: Disco, pop, jazz, funk, R&B, folk rock
- Occupation: Musician
- Instrument: Percussion
- Years active: 1969-present
- Labels: TK Records, Warner Brothers, Motown
- Member of: Gravity 180
- Formerly of: KC and the Sunshine Band
- Website: OliverCBrown.com

Oliver C. Brown (sometimes credited as Oliver Brown) is an American percussionist. Brown was one of the original members of KC & The Sunshine Band. For over four decades, Brown has played with well-known performers from Natalie Cole to Jermaine Jackson.

== Early years and KC and the Sunshine Band ==
Brown's first big break came in Florida with TK Records as their in house percussionist. He recorded and/or toured with most of their artists, including Benny Latimore, Little Beaver, Clarence Reid, Betty Wright, Gwen McCrae, and George McCrae. Following this, he became one of the original members of KC and the Sunshine Band as they recorded their 1974 debut album Do It Good, followed by the album KC and the Sunshine Band which featured "Get Down Tonight" and "That's the Way (I Like It)", their first number one hits on the Billboard charts.

== Late 1970s and early 1980s ==
After moving to Los Angeles, California, Brown expanded his musical horizons with the aid of his brother, Eddie Brown of Joe and Eddie. Eddie Brown arranged his first recording session in L.A. with Gene McDaniels who recorded the 1960s hit, "A Hundred Pounds of Clay". McDaniels was producing Nancy Wilson at the time, so Eddie told McDaniels of Oliver Brown’s credits with KC and The Sunshine Band, who were then featured on the cover of Cashbox magazine. Brown completed the recording session and earned his credits on Nancy Wilson's album, This Mother's Daughter. This opened the door for more recording and touring with such artists as Jermaine Jackson, The Whispers, Larry Vann, Billy Preston, Leo Sayer, Al Jarreau, Natalie Cole, Thelma Houston, saxophonist Cal Bennett, John Stewart, Doug MacLeod, The Beach Boys, Ron Thompson, Chris Bennett, Nils, Fleetwood Mac, Mick Fleetwood's Blue Whale Blues Band and many other Warner Brothers, Capitol Records and Motown Recording artists.

== Gravity 180 ==
Eventually, Brown became the third member of the trio Gravity 180, which he considered to be his greatest artistic achievement to date. The other members of the trio are: Clydene Jackson on keyboards with phenomenal vocals, and Harold Payne on acoustic guitar and vocals. Payne and Jackson are the main songwriters for the group. Gravity 180 was conceived without the aid of trap drums or a bass player; Jackson plays left hand keyboard bass. This gave Brown the opportunity to cover all the territory of trap drums and percussion in the arrangements of their music (driven by percussion).

== Nils ==
Nils is a Billboard #1 smooth jazz artist. Brown performed on all of Nils' albums from his hit LP, Pacific Coast Highway, to his latest issue City Groove. Brown continues to perform with Nils and Gravity 180. He also performs with Alvin Taylor and former Earth, Wind & Fire member, David Lautrec with his group Desert Redux, as well as other prominent artists around the globe.

== Film ==
Brown was featured in Gravity 180, the 2012 documentary film about the group, written, directed, co-produced and edited by Len Rosen. The film was a featured documentary at the Monaco Film Festival in May 2012, and was granted an Honorary award.

== Collaborations ==
With Natalie Cole

- Thankful (Capitol Records, 1977)

With Cher

- Prisoner (Casablanca Records, 1979)

With Syreeta Wright

- Rich Love, Poor Love (Motown, 1977)

With Brian Cadd

- Yesterdaydreams (Capitol Records, 1978)
