= Cat Records (TK label) =

Late 20th-century record label

Cat Records was a subsidiary of TK Productions whose flagship label was TK Records. It had no connections with the Cat Records label of the 1950s which was a division of Atlantic Records. It was founded in 1969 and lasted until 1980. Its most successful artist was Gwen McCrae.
