= KC and the Sunshine Band (album) =

Studio album by KC and the Sunshine Band
- Released: July 6, 1975
- Recorded: 1974–1975
- Genres: Disco; funk
- Length: 27:48
- Label: TK
- Producers: Harry Wayne Casey; Richard Finch

KC and the Sunshine Band chronology
Do It Good (1974)	KC and the Sunshine Band (1975)	The Sound of Sunshine (1975)

Singles from KC and the Sunshine Band
- 1. "Get Down Tonight" Released: February 11, 1975; 2. "That's the Way (I Like It)" Released: June 10, 1975; 3. "I'm So Crazy ('Bout You)" Released: 1975

Professional ratings
Review scores
Source	Rating
AllMusic	4.5/5 stars
Christgau's Record Guide	A−

KC and the Sunshine Band is the second studio album by KC and the Sunshine Band. The record was produced by Harry Wayne Casey and Richard Finch and was released in July 1975 on the TK label.

== History ==
KC and the Sunshine Band contains two of the group's biggest hits, "That's the Way (I Like It)" and "Get Down Tonight", both of which reached No. 1 on the Billboard Hot 100 and the R&B Singles Chart. "Boogie Shoes" also subsequently became a hit in early 1978 after a slightly pitched-down version of the song was included on the Saturday Night Fever soundtrack.

The album was remastered and reissued with bonus tracks in 2012 by Big Break Records.

== Track listing ==
All tracks are written by Harry Wayne Casey and Richard Finch; track 6 additional writing by Willie Clarke.

Side one
No.	Title	Length
1.	"Let It Go (Part One)"	2:56
2.	"That's the Way (I Like It)"	5:07
3.	"Get Down Tonight"	5:14
4.	"Boogie Shoes"	2:15

Side two
No.	Title	Length
5.	"Ain't Nothin' Wrong"	3:07
6.	"I'm So Crazy ('Bout You)"	3:04
7.	"What Makes You Happy"	2:49
8.	"I Get Lifted"	3:04
9.	"Let It Go (Part Two)"	2:01

2012 remastered reissue bonus tracks
No.	Title	Length
10.	"Get Down Tonight" (Single Version)	3:12
11.	"That's The Way (I Like It)" (Single Version)	3:05
12.	"Get Down Tonight" (Tom Moulton Mix)	9:06

== Personnel ==
- Harry Wayne Casey – keyboards, vocals
- Jerome Smith – guitar
- Richard Finch – bass guitar, drum, percussion
- Robert Johnson – drums
- Oliver C. Brown – percussion
- Fermin Goytisolo – percussion
- Ken Faulk – trumpet
- Vinnie Tanno – trumpet
- Mike Lewis – tenor saxophone
- Whit Sidener – baritone saxophone
- Beverly Champion – background vocals
- Margaret Reynolds – background vocals
- Jeanette Williams – background vocals

== Charts ==
=== Weekly charts ===
Chart (1975–1976)	Peak position
Australian (Kent Music Report)	7
Canada Top Albums/CDs (RPM)	5
Dutch Albums (Album Top 100)	5
Swedish Albums (Sverigetopplistan)	27
UK Albums (Official Charts)	26
US Billboard 200	4
US Top R&B/Hip-Hop Albums (Billboard)	1

=== Year-end charts ===
Chart (1975)	Position
Canada Top Albums/CDs (RPM)	33
Dutch Albums (Album Top 100)	42
Chart (1976)	Position
Canada Top Albums/CDs (RPM)	44
US Billboard 200	74

== Certifications ==
Region	Certification	Certified units/sales
Australia (ARIA)	Gold	50,000

== See also ==
- List of Billboard number-one R&B albums of 1975
