= All in a Night's Work =

Studio album by KC and the Sunshine Band
- Released: August 2, 1982
- Recorded: October 1981 – March 1982
- Studio: Sunshine Sound Enterprises (Miami, Florida); George Massenburg Studios (Los Angeles, California)
- Genre: Pop, disco, funk, R&B, synth-pop
- Length: 40:46
- Label: Epic
- Producer: H. W. Casey, Richard Finch

KC and the Sunshine Band chronology
| The Painter (1981) | All in a Night's Work (1982) | KC Ten (1983) |

Singles from All in a Night's Work
- 1. "Give It Up" Released: August 1982 (US)

All in a Night's Work is the ninth studio album by the funk and disco group KC and the Sunshine Band. The album was produced by Harry Wayne Casey and Richard Finch and was released in August 1982 on the Epic label.

== History ==
All in a Night's Work sparked a brief return to success for the band, including the hit track "Give It Up", which became a number 1 hit in the UK and Ireland, and reached number 18 on the pop charts in the United States, after Epic would not release it as a single and when it was eventually released on the next album "KC Ten" on Mega Records in 1983.

== Track listing ==
Side one
| No. | Title | Writer(s) | Length |
|---|---|---|---|
| 1. | "(You Said) You'd Gimme Some More" | Harry Wayne Casey | 7:30 |
| 2. | "Party with Your Body" | Gregory Robinson, Deryl Lampkin | 4:00 |
| 3. | "Give It Up" | Casey, Deborah Carter | 4:13 |
| 4. | "Don't Run (Come Back to Me)" (Duet with Teri DeSario) | Casey, Joseph Simmel | 3:19 |

Side two
| No. | Title | Writer(s) | Length |
|---|---|---|---|
| 5. | "You're Going Out of Your Mind" | Casey | 3:21 |
| 6. | "On the One" | Casey, Beverly Champion, Jimmy "Bo" Horne | 3:54 |
| 7. | "It's Too Hard to Say Goodbye" | Casey, Hazel King | 3:08 |
| 8. | "Do It" | Casey, Gregory Robinson, Gary King | 3:37 |
| 9. | "When You Dance to the Music" | King, Robinson | 3:31 |
| 10. | "Are You Feeling Like Me" | Casey, Evan Steeple | 3:11 |

== Personnel ==
- Harry Wayne Casey – lead vocals, backing vocals, keyboards, arrangements
- Gary King – keyboards, guitars, bass, backing vocals, assisting arrangements
- Steven Gordon – guitars
- James Magnole – guitars
- Richard Finch – bass, drums, percussion, arrangements
- Fermin Goytisolo – percussion, assisting arrangements
- Jimmy "Bo" Horne – percussion, assisting arrangements
- Gary Herbig – saxophones
- Bill Reichenbach Jr. – trombone
- Larry Hall – trumpet, horn arrangements
- Jerry Hey – trumpet, horn arrangements
- Whit Sidener – bass clarinet (10)
- Christine Nield – flute (10)
- Neil Bonsanti – oboe (10)
- Ken Wadenpfuhl – French horn (10)
- Stacey Berkley – harp (10)
- Mike Lewis – horn and string arrangements (10)
- Deryl Lampkin – assisting arrangements
- Gregory Robinson – assisting arrangements
- Deborah Carter – backing vocals
- Beverly Champion – backing vocals, assisting arrangements
- Denise King – backing vocals
- Teri DeSario – lead and backing vocals (4)

=== Production ===
- Harry Wayne Casey – producer, mixing
- Richard Finch – producer, mixing
- Milan Bogdan – engineer, mixing
- David Leonard – horn engineer
- Barbara Rooney – assistant horn engineer
- Bill Darlington – mix assistant
- John Luongo – remixing (1-3)
- Nancy Donald – design
- Bret Lopez – photography
