= Yummy (KC and the Sunshine Band album) =

Studio album by KC and the Sunshine Band
- Released: 2007
- Genre: R&B
- Length: 51:29
- Label: Sunshine Sound
- Producer: H. W. Casey, J. T. Thomas

KC and the Sunshine Band chronology
In a Mellow Mood (2005)	Yummy (2007)	Feeling You! The 60's (2015)

Yummy is the thirteenth studio album by KC and the Sunshine Band, released in 2007. The album was released following a six-year gap after their last complete studio album.

== Track listing ==
1. "Git Off" (Harry Wayne Casey, John Tomas, Francisco Del) – 3:31
2. "Satisfy Me" (Tomas, Del) – 3:37
3. "Let Me See You Move" (Casey) – 2:47
4. "Dance Baby Dance" (Del) – 3:57
5. "When It Comes to Love" (Casey) – 3:37
6. "Hard" (Casey) – 3:13
7. "Do It" (Casey, Joseph King, Alvoid Robinson) – 4:26
8. "Yummy" (Casey) – 3:47
9. "Love Disappears" (Casey, Jeffrey Gaines, S. Quinn) – 3:35
10. "Don't Stop" (Michael Jackson) – 5:36
11. "You're My Friend" (Casey) – 5:25
12. "Secret World" (Peter Gabriel) – 8:14

== Personnel ==
- Harry Wayne Casey – keyboards, vocal
- Amaury López – keyboards
- J. T. Thomas – keyboards
- Amos Larkins – keyboards
- Adrian Garcia – synthesizer
- David Cabrera – guitar, rapping, background vocal
- Andy "Divine" Englund (aka Anders Englund, Kuzey Gustavsson) – guitar
- Manny López – guitar
- Herbert Heck – bass guitar
- Herbert Byrne – bass guitar
- Orlando Hernandez – bass guitar
- Harold Seay – bass guitar
- Francisco "STAR" Del – drum programming, French horn, rapping, background vocal, keyboards, songwriter, producer
- Lester Mendez – drum programming
- Steve Roitstein – drum programming
- Tony Conception – trumpet
- Dana Teboe – trombone
- Ed Calle – saxophone
- Bobby Martinez – saxophone, horn
- Alex Dean – saxophone
- Ed Dana – horn
- Tony Keyes – horn
- Jon Williams – background vocals
- Thomas Hatcher – background vocals
- Shanida Williams – background vocals
- Astrid Stienman – background vocals
- E. J. Waters – background vocals
- Maria DeCrescenzo – rapping, background vocals
- Beverly Champion Foster – rapping, background vocals
- Rita Quintero – background vocals
- Ezara Sanders – background vocals
- Shenita Hunt – background vocals
- Felicia Franklin – background vocals
- George Noriega – background vocals
- Astrid Pazmino – background vocals
- Wendy Pederson – background vocals
