= Who Do Ya (Love) =

Studio album by KC and the Sunshine Band
- Released: August 1978
- Genre: Disco
- Length: 32:58
- Label: TK
- Producer: H. W. Casey, Richard Finch

KC and the Sunshine Band chronology
Part 3 (1976)	Who Do Ya (Love) (1978)	Do You Wanna Go Party (1979)

Professional ratings
Review scores
Source	Rating
AllMusic	2.5/5 stars
Christgau's Record Guide	C+
The Virgin Encyclopedia of R&B and Soul	2/5 stars

Who Do Ya (Love) is the fifth studio album by the disco group KC and the Sunshine Band. The album was produced by Harry Wayne Casey and Richard Finch and was released in August 1978 on the TK label.

== History ==
Who Do Ya (Love) was not as successful as the band's previous albums. Of the three singles released from the album, only one, a cover of the Four Tops' "It's the Same Old Song", managed to place in the top forty of the Billboard Hot 100.

== Track listing ==
All tracks are written by Harry Wayne Casey and Richard Finch, except where noted.

Side one
No.	Title	Length
1.	"Do You Feel All Right"	5:25
2.	"Sho-Nuff'"	4:18
3.	"Come to My Island"	4:20
4.	"So Glad"	4:45

Side two
No.	Title	Writer(s)	Length
5.	"It's the Same Old Song"	Holland–Dozier–Holland	4:23
6.	"Who Do Ya Love"		3:45
7.	"How About a Little Love"		2:27
8.	"I Will Love You Tomorrow"		3:45

== Personnel ==
- Harry Wayne Casey – keyboards, lead vocals
- Jerome Smith – guitar
- Richard Finch – bass guitar; drums (tracks 5, 8)
- Robert Johnson – drums (tracks 1–4, 6, 7)
- Fermin Goytisolo – percussion
- Ken Faulk – trumpet
- Vinnie Tanno – trumpet
- Mike Lewis – tenor saxophone
- Whit Sidener – baritone saxophone
- Beverly Champion – background vocals
- Jeanette Williams – background vocals
