= Oh Yeah! (KC and the Sunshine Band album) =

Studio album by KC and the Sunshine Band
- Released: October 1993
- Recorded: March–July 1993
- Genre: Pop, R&B
- Length: 49:54
- Label: ZYX Music
- Producer: Robyx

KC and the Sunshine Band chronology
The Best of KC and the Sunshine Band (1990)	Oh Yeah! (1993)	Get Down Live! (1995)

Oh Yeah! is the eleventh studio album released in 1993 by KC and the Sunshine Band.

This was the first album by the band since 1984, when the band split. Despite this, the album was unsuccessful, and failed to chart.

== Track listing ==
1. "Megamix (The Official Bootleg)" (Casey, Finch, Carter) – 8:03
2. "Somebody Somewhere" (Casey, Weaver) – 3:07
3. "Will You Love Me in the Morning?" (Mollison) – 3:35
4. "Hold Me Tight" (Casey) – 3:10
5. "Give It Up" (Casey, Carter) – 3:30
6. "Please Don't Go (Live in Versilia)" (Casey, Finch) – 3:05
7. "Coast To Coast" (Casey, Shaffer) – 3:10
8. "I Can't Forget" (Casey) – 3:42
9. "Gonna Let It Go" (Casey) – 4:19
10. "Don't Stop" (McVie) – 3:25
11. "Turn the Music Up" (Casey, Weaver) – 3:18
12. "Desire" (Piccirillo) – 2:58
13. "High Above the Clouds" (Walden, Cohen) – 4:10

== Personnel ==
- Harry Wayne Casey – keyboards, vocal
- Robyx – keyboards
- Maurizio Bertozzi – keyboards
- Marco Canepa – keyboards
- Maria De Crescenzo – vocal
- Beverly Champion Foster – background vocals
