= Give It Up (KC and the Sunshine Band song) =

1983 single by KC and the Sunshine Band

Single by KC and the Sunshine Band

from the album All in a Night's Work and KC Ten
- B-side: "Uptight"
- Released: 1983
- Genre: Dance-pop; post-disco
- Length: 4:14 (album version); 4:05 (7" version); 5:16 (12" version)
- Label: Epic; Meca Records
- Songwriters: Harry Wayne Casey; Deborah Carter
- Producers: H. W. Casey; Richard Finch

KC and the Sunshine Band singles chronology
"Don't Run (Come Back to Me)" (1982)	"Give It Up" (1983)	"Are You Ready?" (1984)

Music video
- "Give It Up" on YouTube

"Give It Up" is a song by American disco and funk band KC and the Sunshine Band, although it was simply credited as KC in several markets, including the United States. Following the backlash against many disco artists on the charts at the beginning of the 1980s, "Give It Up" was a comeback hit for the band in the US. Epic Records refused to re-release it when it was included on the band's 1982 album All in a Night's Work and it failed to chart upon initial release; however, the independent Meca Records label showed its support and included it on the band's 1983 album KC Ten.

Following its re-release, "Give It Up" peaked at number 18 on the US Billboard Hot 100 in March 1984. It had been a hit in the United Kingdom several months earlier, when it topped the UK singles chart for three weeks in August 1983. It went on to become the 18th-best-selling single of the year in the UK. "Give It Up" was the last of the band's hit singles in the US and UK and is their most successful UK hit. Elsewhere, "Give It Up" peaked at number two in Belgium, number three in Australia, and reached the top 10 in several other markets.

In 1993, Danish musical group Cut 'N' Move scored a big hit with their version of "Give It Up", which reached number one in Australia and their native Denmark.

== Charts ==
=== Weekly charts ===
Chart (1983–1984)	Peak position
Australia (Kent Music Report)	3
Belgium (VRT Top 30 Flanders)	2
Ireland (IRMA)	1
Netherlands (Dutch Top 40)	6
Netherlands (Single Top 100)	8
New Zealand (Recorded Music NZ)	4
South Africa (Springbok)	6
Sweden (Sverigetopplistan)	12
UK Singles (Official Charts)	1
Uruguay (UPI)	6
US Billboard Hot 100	18
US Dance/Disco Top 80 (Billboard)	24
US Cash Box Top 100	17
West Germany (GfK)	23

=== Year-end charts ===
Chart (1983)	Position
Australia (Kent Music Report)	17
UK Singles (OCC)	19

Chart (1984)	Position
US (Joel Whitburn's Pop Annual)	127
US Billboard Hot 100	75

== Certifications ==
Region	Certification	Certified units/sales
Australia (ARIA)	Gold	35,000^{‡}
Denmark (IFPI Danmark)	Gold	45,000^{‡}
New Zealand (RMNZ)	2× Platinum	60,000^{‡}
United Kingdom (BPI)	Platinum	600,000^{‡}
^{‡} Sales+streaming figures based on certification alone.

== Cut 'N' Move version ==
"Give It Up"

Single by Cut 'N' Move

from the album Peace, Love & Harmony
- Released: February 3, 1993
- Genre: Eurodance
- Length: 4:22
- Label: SoulPower Productions
- Songwriters: Casey & Finch
- Producers: Jørn K; Per Holm

Cut 'N' Move singles chronology
"Spread Love" (1991)	"Give It Up" (1993)	"Peace, Love & Harmony" (1993)

Music video
- "Give It Up" on YouTube

"Give It Up" was covered by Danish Eurodance group Cut 'N' Move and released in February 1993 as the first single from their second album, Peace, Love & Harmony (1993). The vocals were performed by Zindy Laursen and Thera Hoeymans while the rap segment was performed by MC Zipp (a.k.a. Jens Kjær Larsen).

Cut 'N' Move's version reached number one in Denmark for five weeks and in Australia for four weeks. It also peaked at number two in Norway, number five in New Zealand, and number six in Austria, Germany, and Sweden. On the Eurochart Hot 100, it reached number 31 in August 1993. A colorful music video was produced to promote the single. Cut 'N' Move covered the song again in 1997 for Dancemania Covers.

=== Track listing ===
Denmark, CD maxi (1993)
No.	Title	Length
1.	"Give It Up" (album version)	4:22
2.	"Give It Up" (extended version)	5:54
3.	"Cut 'N' Move Theme Part II"	2:51
4.	"Give It Up" (instrumental version)	4:21

=== Charts ===
==== Weekly charts ====
Chart (1993–1994)	Peak position
Australia (ARIA)	1
Austria (Ö3 Austria Top 40)	6
Belgium (Ultratop 50 Flanders)	43
Denmark (IFPI)	1
Europe (Eurochart Hot 100)	31
Germany (GfK)	6
Netherlands (Dutch Top 40)	27
Netherlands (Single Top 100)	30
New Zealand (Recorded Music NZ)	5
Norway (VG-lista)	2
Spain (AFYVE)	7
Sweden (Sverigetopplistan)	6
Switzerland (Schweizer Hitparade)	34
UK Singles (Official Charts)	61
UK Dance (Music Week)	23
UK Club Chart (Music Week)	72

==== Year-end charts ====
Chart (1993)	Position
Europe (Eurochart Hot 100)	58
Germany (Media Control)	33
Netherlands (Dutch Top 40)	174
Sweden (Topplistan)	62

Chart (1994)	Position
Australia (ARIA)	13
New Zealand (RIANZ)	32

=== Certifications ===
Region	Certification	Certified units/sales
Australia (ARIA)	Platinum	70,000^{^}
Germany (BVMI)	Gold	250,000^{^}
^{^} Shipments figures based on certification alone.

=== Release history ===
Region	Date	Format(s)	Label(s)	Ref.
Europe	February 3, 1993	12-inch vinyl; CD	SoulPower Productions	
United Kingdom	September 20, 1993	7-inch vinyl; 12-inch vinyl; CD	EMI United Kingdom	
Australia	November 29, 1993	CD; cassette	EMI United Kingdom; SoulPower Productions	
Japan	June 29, 1994	Mini-CD	EMI	

== Cover versions ==
The song was covered by Annie Lennox and Chrissie Hynde during a live performance at the Royal Albert Hall in London on February 9, 1986.

"Love You Long Time" by The Black Eyed Peas, from their 2010 album, The Beginning, contains a sample of "Give It Up".

The song was also covered by the Quebecer singer Jacynthe on her 1999 album Entends-tu mon cœur. This version adds French lines to the verses, while keeping the original chorus.

A Swedish version ("Ge mig allt") was recorded by Cotton Club in 1984.

In 2019, the melody of the song was used in "Atje voor de sfeer" by Dutch singer René Karst, a song about alcohol consumption.

== In popular culture ==
- The song has been turned into a sporting chant in Ireland, and the United Kingdom, especially at football games in England and Scotland:
  - After Liverpool defeated Manchester United 5-0 on October 25, 2021, Liverpool's travelling fans mocked under pressure Manchester United manager Ole Gunnar Solskjær by singing "Ole's at the Wheel" to the tune of "Give It Up".
  - At a UEFA Europa Conference League match on September 8, 2022, following the death of Queen Elizabeth II, a crowd of Shamrock Rovers supporters at Tallaght Stadium were heard singing the chant as "Lizzie's in a Box" to mock the death (owing to historic anti-British sentiment in Ireland).
  - The song is commonly used in support of UFC mixed martial artist Tom Aspinall during his fights.
  - The song is the walk-on music for darts player Vincent van der Voort. The crowd is singing his name during the chorus, replacing the words "Baby, give it up". They usually do the same when supporting other darters if their names have the same amount of syllables as this sentence.
- The song is heard in Richmond Valentine (Samuel L. Jackson)'s lair when Valentine activates the V-Day program in the 2014 film Kingsman: The Secret Service.
- The song is played at the beginning of concerts by Scottish singer Gerry Cinnamon.
- The song is featured in the opening scene of the Black Mirror episode “Loch Henry”.
