= Richard Finch (producer) =

American songwriter and record producer

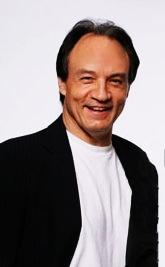

Background information
- Also known as: Rick Finch
- Born: Richard Raymond Finch; January 23, 1954 (age 72); Indianapolis, Indiana, U.S.
- Occupations: Record producer; songwriter; audio engineer; song arranger
- Instruments: Bass, drums, percussion
- Years active: 1960s–present
- Formerly of: KC and the Sunshine Band
- Website: www.rickfinch.com

Richard Raymond Finch (born January 23, 1954) is an American songwriter, producer, and arranger. He is best known as the co-founder, producer and former bass guitar player of KC and the Sunshine Band. Along with Harry Wayne Casey, he co-wrote the majority of the KC and the Sunshine Band music catalog, to include five No. 1 Billboard Hot 100 hits.

== Biography ==
Born in Indianapolis, Indiana, the second youngest of five children, Finch moved with his family to Hialeah, Florida, when he was an infant. When Finch was five, his father died unexpectedly, leaving his mother to raise Finch and his four siblings alone. His favorite group growing up was The Beatles. His musical tastes grew to include soul and country music. In his early teens, Finch got his first electric bass guitar and began to learn country music bass lines. He joined several country bands before joining the band Ball & Chain.

Finch became interested in audio recording techniques while working at an Opa Locka, Florida electronics and record store. A schoolmate introduced him to the singer-songwriter Clarence Reid from TK Records. His high school attendance suffered as he spent every free moment at TK Records and unbeknownst to his mother, he dropped out of high school his sophomore year and shortly thereafter was hired as a part-time recording engineer for the label. Henry Stone, Clarence Reid and Willie Clark (in a comment to SongFacts on an interview conducted with Finch in 2010) introduced Finch to Harry Wayne Casey, three years his senior. Casey was hired to work in the shipping department and act as TK's occasional receptionist.

Prior to his introduction to Casey, Finch had already established himself at TK as a skilled engineer, with numerous singles produced before the age of 17, including various tracks for the Allman Brothers and Mother's Finest. and in 1972, for recording artist Jack Vino for Steve Alaimo and TK Records on the Bell Records Label.

Within weeks of meeting, the Finch-Casey songwriting collaboration began, with their first hit songs recorded by Betty Wright ("Where Is the Love") and George McCrae ("Rock Your Baby"). Finch then assembled the future Sunshine Band members, utilizing his already-established friendships with TK session musicians, guitarist Jerome Smith and drummer Robert Johnson.

The Finch–Casey collaboration produced numerous hits, including "(Shake, Shake, Shake) Shake Your Booty", "Get Down Tonight", "Please Don't Go" and "Boogie Shoes".

== Criminal convictions ==
On March 23, 2010, Finch was arrested in Newark, Ohio, accused of having inappropriate contact with a 17-year-old male.

At his bond hearing on April 6, 2010, Finch entered a plea of not guilty to all charges. In December 2010, Finch pleaded "no contest" and was sentenced to seven years' imprisonment. He served his sentence in Chillicothe Correctional Institution, a medium-security state prison in Ohio, and was released on March 13, 2017.

== Legacy ==
Finch is a multi-Grammy Award winner with three wins and nine nominations. He is the recipient of an American Music Award and a star on the Hollywood Walk of Fame having been a part of the KC and the Sunshine Band legacy. In October 2010, Finch became a nominee to the Songwriters Hall of Fame.

== Discography ==
With KC and the Sunshine Band

- Do It Good (1974)
- KC and the Sunshine Band (1975)
- The Sound of Sunshine (1975)
- Part 3 (1976)
- Who Do Ya Love (1978)
- Do You Wanna Go Party (1979)
- Space Cadet Solo Flight (1981)
- The Painter (1981)
- All in a Night's Work (1982)
- KC Ten (1983)

As songwriter

Writer: H.W. Casey & R. Finch

- "Move Me Baby" (1974) – Gwen McCrae<
- "You Get Me Hot" (1979) – Jimmy "Bo" Horne
- "Goin' Home for Love" (1979) – Jimmy "Bo" Horne
- "I Get Lifted" (1979) – Jimmy "Bo" Horne
- "Without You" (1979) – Jimmy "Bo" Horne

== See also ==
- Henry Stone
- George McCrae
