= I'm Your Boogie Man =

1977 single by KC & the Sunshine Band

Single by KC and the Sunshine Band

from the album Part 3
- B-side: "Wrap Your Arms Around Me"
- Released: February 3, 1977
- Genre: Disco
- Length: 4:04
- Label: TK
- Songwriters: Harry Wayne Casey; Richard Finch
- Producers: Harry Wayne Casey; Richard Finch

KC and the Sunshine Band singles chronology
"I Like to Do It" (1976)	"I'm Your Boogie Man" (1977)	"Keep It Comin' Love" (1977)

"I'm Your Boogie Man" is a song by American disco and funk band KC and the Sunshine Band from their fourth album Part 3. It was written and produced by Harry Wayne Casey and Richard Finch.

== Background ==
Richard Finch said that the song was written about DJ Robert W. Walker of a Miami, Florida, radio station, who was the first to give airplay to the group's hit single "Get Down Tonight".

== Reception ==
New York Times critic John Rockwell called the song "another alluring, catchy, sleepily kinetic dance [disc]" and a "perfect summer (or spring, fall or winter) party record."

Record World said that "re-defining their hit formula with a sharp, syncopated beat and sassy vocals, it's poised to go all the way."

== Chart performance ==
In 1977, the song reached the number one position on the Billboard Hot 100 and No. 3 on the soul chart. Billboard ranked it as the #11 song of 1977. The song was also an international hit, reaching number one in Canada and charting in Australia (No. 38), Belgium (No. 16), the Netherlands (No. 6), New Zealand (No. 12), and the United Kingdom (No. 41).

== Charts ==
=== Weekly charts ===
Chart (1976–1977)	Peak position
Australia (Kent Music Report)	38
Belgium (Ultratop 50 Flanders)	16
Canada Dance/Urban (RPM)	1
Canada Top Singles (RPM)	1
France (IFOP)	34
Netherlands (Dutch Top 40)	6
Netherlands (Single Top 100)	6
New Zealand (Recorded Music NZ)	12
UK Singles (Official Charts)	41
US Billboard Hot 100	1
US Billboard Hot Disco Singles	9
US Billboard Hot Soul Singles	3
US Cash Box Top 100	1
US Record World	1

=== Year-end charts ===
Chart (1977)	Position
Canada Top Singles (RPM)	22
Netherlands (Dutch Top 40)	63
Netherlands (Single Top 100)	73
US Billboard Hot 100	11
US Cash Box Top 100	15

== Certifications ==
Region	Certification	Certified units/sales
Canada (Music Canada)	Gold	75,000^{^}
United States (RIAA)	Gold	500,000^{‡}
^{^} Shipments figures based on certification alone.^{‡} Sales+streaming figures based on certification alone.

== White Zombie version ==
"I'm Your Boogieman"

Promotional single by White Zombie

from the album The Crow: City of Angels Soundtrack
- Released: 1996
- Length: 4:27
- Label: Hollywood
- Songwriters: Harry Wayne Casey; Richard Finch
- Producers: Terry Date; Ulrich Wild; White Zombie

White Zombie singles chronology
"The One" (1996)	"I'm Your Boogieman" (1996)	"Ratfinks, Suicide Tanks and Cannibal Girls" (1996)

American band White Zombie originally recorded a cover of "I'm Your Boogie Man" for The Crow: City of Angels Soundtrack. However, since the song's release date, it has also appeared on Rob Zombie's greatest hits album Past, Present & Future and as a remixed version on the EP Supersexy Swingin' Sounds.

The audio samples in the song where children are heard saying "He's gonna get you! The Boogeyman is coming!" are taken from the 1978 film Halloween, which would later be remade in 2007 by Rob Zombie. The remixed version was also heard on a Halloween episode of the ABC television series 666 Park Avenue.

=== Reception ===
The song earned White Zombie their third and final Grammy nomination for Best Metal Performance in 1997. Stephen Thomas Erlewine of AllMusic called the cover "embarrassingly predictable, humorless, and clueless."

=== Track listing ===
American promo single
No.	Title	Length
1.	"I'm Your Boogieman"	4:27

European promo single
No.	Title	Length
1.	"I'm Your Boogieman" (Sex on the Rocks mix)	4:50

== See also ==
- List of Billboard Hot 100 number-one singles of 1977
- List of Cash Box Top 100 number-one singles of 1977
- List of number-one singles of 1977 (Canada)
- List of RPM number-one dance singles of 1976
