= George McCrae =

American soul and disco singer

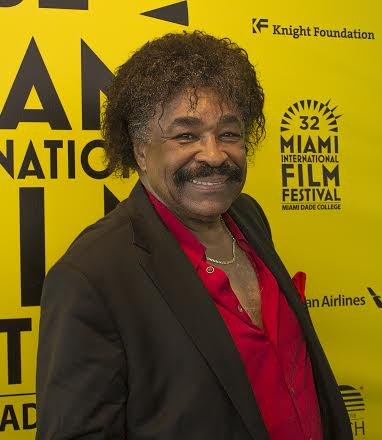
- McCrae at the 2015 Miami International Film Festival

Background information
- Born: George Warren McCrae Jr. October 19, 1944 (age 81); West Palm Beach, Florida, U.S.
- Genres: Soul; disco; funk
- Occupation: Singer
- Years active: 1963–present
- Labels: Alston; TK; RCA; Jayboy; President
- Website: georgemccrae.com

George Warren McCrae Jr. (McCray, born October 19, 1944) is an American soul and disco singer who is most famous for his 1974 hit "Rock Your Baby".

== Biography and career ==
McCrae was the second of nine children, born in West Palm Beach, Florida. He formed his own singing group, the Jivin' Jets, before joining the United States Navy in 1963. He married Gwen McCrae (née Mosley) in 1963. Four years later, he re-formed the group, with his wife Gwen joining the lineup, but soon afterwards they decided to work as a duo, recording for Henry Stone's Alston record label. Gwen then won a solo contract, with George acting as her manager as well as doing some singing on sessions and in clubs in Palm Beach.

He was about to return to college to study law enforcement, when Richard Finch and Harry Wayne Casey of KC and the Sunshine Band invited him to sing the lyrics for a song that they had recorded for the band, but could not reach the high notes that were required for the song. The original intention was that Gwen, his wife, should record it, but she was late for the session and George recorded alone. It suited his high-pitched voice to the extent that the song, "Rock Your Baby", became one of the first hits of the disco era in 1974, selling an estimated eleven million copies worldwide, topping the charts in the U.S. and the UK. The song was so successful that Rolling Stone magazine voted it the No. 1 song of the year in 1974. McCrae received a Grammy Award nomination for Best Male R&B Vocalist the following year.

Two further single releases, "I Can't Leave You Alone", backed by "I Get Lifted", and "It's Been So Long", also reached the UK Singles Chart Top 10. He recorded several further albums for TK, including George McCrae (1975) and Diamond Touch (1976), and also continued to record with, and manage, his wife until their divorce in 1976. They had two daughters together, Sophia and Leah.

While he continued to record albums including We Did It! and his second self-titled album George McCrae (both 1978), his commercial popularity slipped as the decade progressed. He married a second time, moved to Canada, and entered a period of semi-retirement, leaving TK at the end of the 1970s. With his second wife, he had another daughter, Jennifer McCray.

He returned with the album One Step Closer to Love in 1984, the title track from which entered the charts in the United Kingdom and Belgium. In 1988, he had a daughter, Marcella, with his then-girlfriend, Rosanna Molignini. He moved to the village Munstergeleen in the Netherlands and remarried again, to Dutch model Yvonne Bergsma, in 1989. They have a son, Shaka.

His later albums found some success in Europe, and he continued to perform regularly there. By the 2000s, he shared his time between homes in Florida, Aruba, and the Netherlands. In 2016 McCrae released a new concept album, Love, that was produced by the Dutch producer / composer Roger Heijster and released on the label PopMi Music. The album was recorded without sequencing using only vintage instruments. Leah and Sophia McCrae, George's two daughters from his first marriage to Gwen McCrae, provide the backing vocals for this album. The album was album of the week in Germany and the single "Sexy Woman" was number one in Mallorca. In December 2017, McCrae performed on the BBC's Hootenanny show hosted by Jools Holland.

== Discography ==
=== Albums ===
Year	Album	Peak chart positions				Certifications
Year	Album	US	US R&B	AUS	UK	Certifications
1974	Rock Your Baby	38	7	26	13	BPI: Silver; CRIA: Gold
1975	George McCrae	152	24	—	21	
1975	Together (with Gwen McCrae)	—	33	—	—	
1976	Diamond Touch	—	—	—	—	
1978	George McCrae	—	—	—	—	
1978	We Did It	—	—	—	—	
1984	One Step Closer to Love	—	—	—	—	
1984	Own the Night (Note: Re-released as Love's Been Good to Me)	—	—	—	—	
1987	I Feel Love for You	—	—	—	—	
1991	With All My Heart	—	—	—	—	
1995	Do Something	—	—	—	—	
1996	Romance	—	—	—	—	
2009	Time for a Change	—	—	—	—	
2016	Love	—	—	—	—	
Recorded 1989/Released 2026	Perfect Combination	—	—	—	—	
"—" denotes releases that did not chart.

=== Singles ===
Year	Single	Peak chart positions												Certifications	Album
Year	Single	US	US R&B	AUS	GER	AUT	SWI	NED	BEL (FLA)	SWE	NOR	IRE	UK	Certifications	Album
1974	"Rock Your Baby"	1	1	2	1	1	1	1	1	—	1	3	1	BPI: Gold	Rock Your Baby
1974	"I Can't Leave You Alone"	50	10	92	3	11	—	4	3	—	—	—	9		Rock Your Baby
1974	"You Can Have It All"	—	—	—	—	—	—	—	—	—	—	—	23		Rock Your Baby
1975	"I Get Lifted"	37	8	—	—	—	—	—	—	—	—	—	—		Rock Your Baby
1975	"Look at You"	95	31	—	—	—	—	—	—	—	—	—	—		Rock Your Baby
1975	"Sing a Happy Song"	—	—	—	13	—	—	—	27	—	—	—	38		George McCrae
1975	"It's Been So Long"	—	—	—	27	—	—	—	—	—	—	4	4	BPI: Silver	George McCrae
1975	"I Ain't Lyin'"	—	31	—	35	—	—	—	—	—	—	—	12		George McCrae
1976	"Honey I"	65	18	—	—	—	—	—	—	20	—	—	33		George McCrae
1976	"Love in Motion"	—	—	—	—	—	—	—	—	—	—	—	—		Diamond Touch
1977	"I'm Gonna Stay with My Baby Tonight"	—	—	—	—	—	—	—	—	—	—	—	—		Diamond Touch
1977	"Kiss Me the Way I Like It"	110	57	—	—	—	—	—	—	—	—	—	—		George McCrae (II)
1978	"Let's Dance"	—	93	—	—	—	—	—	—	—	—	—	—		George McCrae (II)
1978	"(You've Got) My Love, My Life, My Soul"	—	—	—	—	—	—	—	—	—	—	—	—		We Did It!
1978	"I Want You Around Me"	—	91	—	—	—	—	—	—	—	—	—	—		We Did It!
1979	"Don't You Feel My Love"	—	—	—	—	—	—	—	—	—	—	—	—		We Did It!
1984	"One Step Closer (To Love)"	—	—	—	—	—	—	—	19	—	—	—	57		One Step Closer To Love
1984	"Listen to Your Heart"	—	—	—	—	—	—	—	—	—	—	—	—		One Step Closer To Love
1984	"Never Too Late" (NED only)	—	—	—	—	—	—	—	—	—	—	—	—		One Step Closer To Love
1984	"Own the Night"	—	—	—	—	—	—	—	—	—	—	—	—		Own the Night
1985	"Let's Dance / Never Forgot Your Eyes" (UK only)	—	—	—	—	—	—	—	—	—	—	—	—		Singles only
1986	"Rock Your Baby (Frankfurt Mix)"	—	—	—	—	—	—	—	—	—	—	—	92		Singles only
1987	"That's Love"	—	—	—	—	—	—	—	—	—	—	—	—		I Feel Love for You
1987	"Girls Don't Lie" (UK only)	—	—	—	—	—	—	—	—	—	—	—	—		I Feel Love for You
1988	"Nice and Slow"	—	—	—	—	—	—	1	1	—	—	—	17		Singles only
1989	"Rock Me All the Way" (NED only)	—	—	—	—	—	—	—	—	—	—	—	—		Singles only
1990	"Breathless" (GER only)	—	—	—	—	—	—	—	—	—	—	—	—		With All My Heart
1991	"Calling Love" (GER only)	—	—	—	—	—	—	—	—	—	—	—	—		With All My Heart
1991	"Take This Love of Mine" (GER only)	—	—	—	—	—	—	—	—	—	—	—	—		With All My Heart
1994	"All Around the World (The Fresh Taste of Happiness)"	—	—	—	—	—	—	—	—	—	—	—	—		Single only
1995	"Do Something" (GER only)	—	—	—	82	—	—	—	—	—	—	—	—		Do Something
1995	"Wanna Be Your Lover" (GER only)	—	—	—	—	—	—	—	—	—	—	—	—		Do Something
1996	"Little Things Softly" (GER only)	—	—	—	—	—	—	—	—	—	—	—	—		Do Something
2009	"It's Been So Long 2009" (GER only)	—	—	—	—	—	—	—	—	—	—	—	—		Time for a Change
"—" denotes releases that did not chart or were not released.

== See also ==
- List of soul musicians
- List of disco artists (F-K)
- List of artists who reached number one in the United States
- List of artists who reached number one on the UK Singles Chart
- List of performers on Top of the Pops
- List of artists who reached number one on the Billboard R&B chart
- List of Epic Records artists
