= Jimmy "Bo" Horne =

American musician (born 1949)

- Birth name: Jimmie Horace Horne Jr.
- Born: September 28, 1949 (age 75); West Palm Beach, Florida, United States
- Genres: R&B, disco, soul, funk
- Occupation(s): Musician, singer
- Instruments: Vocals
- Years active: 1967–present

Jimmie Horace Horne Jr. (born September 28, 1949), known as Jimmy "Bo" Horne, is an American singer and musician, whose most successful singles include "Gimme Some" (1975) and "Dance Across the Floor" (1978). Many of Horne's songs have been used on film and video game soundtracks or used as samples by other artists.

== Biography ==
Horne was born on September 28, 1949, in West Palm Beach, Florida. He was an only child and both his parents were school teachers. In 1971, he completed a sociology degree at Bethune-Cookman University in Daytona Beach. He later relocated to Miami to begin his career as a recording artist.

The peak of Horne's career came in the 1970s, recording disco and pop tracks for labels including Alston and Sunshine Sound Records, a subsidiary of TK Records. Horne's biggest hit was "Dance Across the Floor", released in 1978, which was his sole R&B top 10 hit single, written and produced by Harry Wayne Casey of KC and the Sunshine Band. "Dance Across the Floor" was certified double gold.

Horne's other top 20 R&B single was "You Get Me Hot", released in 1979 on Sunshine Sound Records. Several other of Horne's releases during this period were popular club hits, including "Spank", "Gimme Some", "Get Happy", and "Let Me (Let Me Be Your Lover)". His tracks also featured on Soul Train, American Bandstand, and some television sitcoms. Horne's last single to enter the R&B charts was "Is It In" in 1980.

Horne also appeared as a guest on the Marilu Henner Show, alongside Harry Wayne Casey.

Since the end of his music career, Horne has worked in event management as the president of Joy Productions, a company he founded in 1976.

== Cover versions and samples ==
Horne's 1975 song "Gimme Some" was a UK top 20 hit for Brendon in 1977. Horne's 1978 song "Let Me (Let Me Be Your Lover)", was sampled by the Stereo MCs in their 1992 song, "Connected". Horne's song "Spank" was heavily sampled by DJ Falcon in Falcon's song "First." For a year between 1997 and 1998, Horne's 1977 song "Get Happy" was played in the background of The Chris Rock Show on HBO. It is also sampled in The Council's "Prepare for the Shining". His 1978 song "Dance Across the Floor" was sampled by Cee Lo Green and Christina Aguilera in their "Nasty" duet, which was released in May 2011.

"Dance Across the Floor" appeared in the hit Brazilian gangster movie City of God. It was sampled by Da Lench Mob for their 1993 song "Freedom Got an AK", as well as by DJ Cash Money & Marvelous in their 1988 song "The Mighty Hard Rocker". "Spank" was sampled in 1998 for D'Menace's "Deep Menace", as well as Ultra Naté's "Release The Pressure", and also featured in the 1998 film 54. "Is It In" was later featured on the fictional radio station, Paradise FM, on Rockstar Games' Grand Theft Auto: Vice City Stories. It was also sampled by Jungle Brothers for the 1989 song "Beyond this World" as well as Kasino for their 1998 song "Nasty Girl".

== Discography ==
=== Albums ===
Year	Album	Chart positions	
Year	Album	US 200	US R&B
1978	Dance Across the Floor	122	23
1979	Goin' Home for Love	—	42
1991	"Bo" Horne '91 (credited as "Bo" Horne)	—	—
"—" denotes releases that did not chart.

=== Singles ===
Single	Year	Peak chart positions			
Single	Year	US Hot 100	US R&B	US Dance	AUS
"Down the Road of Love"	1967	―	―	―	―
"Clean Up Man"	1972	―	―	―	―
"Don't Worry About It"	1975	―	―	―	―
"Gimme Some (Part One)"	1975	―	47	8	―
"Get Happy"	1977	―	46	19	―
"Dance Across the Floor"	1978	38	8	―	―
"Let Me (Let Me Be Your Lover)"	1978	―	60	―	―
"Spank"	1979	―	55	48	88
"You Get Me Hot"	1979	101	18	―	―
"If We Were Still"	1979	―	―	―	―
"Without You"	1980	―	78	―	―
"Is It In"	1980	―	77	32	—
"You're So Good to Me"	1983	―	―	―	―
"Rocket in the Pocket"	1984	―	―	―	―
"Let's Do It"	1985	―	―	―	―
"Show Me How Much"	1987	―	―	―	―
"Spank '87"	1987	―	―	―	―
"Rhythm in My Heart"	1989	―	―	―	―
"—" denotes releases that did not chart or were not released in that territory.
