= (Shake, Shake, Shake) Shake Your Booty =

Single by KC and the Sunshine Band

from the album Part 3
- B-side: "Boogie Shoes"
- Released: May 28, 1976
- Genre: Disco
- Length: 3:07
- Label: TK
- Songwriters: Harry Wayne Casey; Richard Finch
- Producers: Harry Wayne Casey; Richard Finch

KC and the Sunshine Band singles chronology
"I Get Lifted" (1976)	"(Shake, Shake, Shake) Shake Your Booty" (1976)	"I Like to Do It" (1976)

Official audio
- "(Shake, Shake, Shake) Shake Your Booty" on YouTube

"(Shake, Shake, Shake) Shake Your Booty" (also titled simply "Shake Your Booty") is a song recorded and released in 1976 by KC and the Sunshine Band for the album Part 3. The song became their third number-one hit on the Billboard Hot 100, as well as their third number-one on the Hot Soul Singles chart. According to KC, the song had a lot of meaning and depth. During his performance he would witness much of the crowd having a good time. The song inspired people to "get off their can and get out there and do it". The B-side of "Shake Your Booty" is "Boogie Shoes", which later became a hit on its own after it appeared on the Saturday Night Fever soundtrack in 1977 and then having its own release as a single in early 1978, becoming a top 40 hit in several countries including the UK and US.

The chorus consists of the title expression with shake appearing eight times.

Record World said that "A hypnotic invitation to get on the dance floor and shake, shake, shake your booty is one that you just can't pass up!"

== Charts ==
=== Weekly charts ===
Chart (1976)	Peak position
Australia (Kent Music Report)	16
Belgium (Ultratop 50 Flanders)	13
Canada Top Singles (RPM)	1
Netherlands (Dutch Top 40)	11
Netherlands (Single Top 100)	6
New Zealand (Recorded Music NZ)	7
Norway (VG-lista)	9
South Africa (Springbok Radio)	8
Sweden (Sverigetopplistan)	12
UK Singles (Official Charts)	22
US Billboard Hot 100	1
US Hot Disco Singles (Billboard)	6
US Hot Soul Singles (Billboard)	1
US Cash Box Top 100	1
US Record World Singles	1
West Germany (GfK)	23

=== Year-end charts ===
Chart (1976)	Rank
Canada Top Singles (RPM)	19
US Billboard Hot 100	26
US Hot Soul Singles (Billboard)	4
US Cash Box Top 100	10

== Certifications ==
Certifications for "Shake Your Booty"
Region	Certification	Certified units/sales
Canada (Music Canada)	Gold	75,000^{^}
United States (RIAA)	Gold	500,000^{‡}
^{^} Shipments figures based on certification alone.^{‡} Sales+streaming figures based on certification alone.

== See also ==
- List of Billboard Hot 100 number-one singles of 1976
- List of Cash Box Top 100 number-one singles of 1976
- List of number-one R&B singles of 1976 (U.S.)
- List of number-one singles of 1976 (Canada)
