= Keep It Comin' Love =

Single by KC and the Sunshine Band

from the album Part 3
- B-side: "Baby I Love You"
- Released: May 16, 1977
- Recorded: 1976
- Genre: Disco
- Length: 4:32 (album version); 3:53 (single version)
- Label: TK
- Songwriters: Harry Wayne Casey; Richard Finch
- Producers: Harry Wayne Casey; Richard Finch

KC and the Sunshine Band singles chronology
"I'm Your Boogie Man" (1977)	"Keep It Comin' Love" (1977)	"Wrap Your Arms Around Me" (1977)

"Keep It Comin' Love" is a song by KC and the Sunshine Band, released as a single in 1977. It appeared on their 1976 album, Part 3. The song, like its predecessor "That's the Way (I Like It)", became widely successful due to its sexual double entendres.

== Chart performance ==
"Keep It Comin' Love", peaking at No. 2 on the Billboard Hot 100, was kept out of the No.1 spot by both "Star Wars Theme/Cantina Band" by Meco and "You Light Up My Life" by Debby Boone. The song made it to number one on the Hot Soul Singles chart. It was also a minor crossover to the Adult Contemporary chart, peaking at No. 36. The song was also an international chart hit, reaching No. 1 in Canada and charting in Australia (No. 28), Belgium (No. 5), the Netherlands (No. 8), New Zealand (No. 19) and the United Kingdom (No. 31).

=== Weekly charts ===
Chart (1977)	Peak position
Australia (Kent Music Report)	28
Belgium (Ultratop 50 Flanders)	10
Canada Adult Contemporary (RPM)	4
Canada Dance/Urban (RPM)	1
Canada Top Singles (RPM)	1
Netherlands (Dutch Top 40)	8
Netherlands (Single Top 100)	8
New Zealand (Recorded Music NZ)	19
UK Singles (Official Charts)	31
US Billboard Easy Listening	36
US Billboard Hot 100	2
US Billboard Hot Soul Singles	1
US Cash Box	2
US Record World	2

=== Year-end charts ===
Chart (1977)	Rank
Canada Top Singles (RPM)	31
Netherlands (Dutch Top 40)	93
Netherlands (Single Top 100)	87
US Billboard Hot 100	75
US Cash Box	27

== See also ==
- List of number-one singles of 1977 (Canada)
- List of number-one R&B singles of 1977 (U.S.)
