= Get Down Tonight =

- French 7-Inch Single Cover

Single by KC and the Sunshine Band

from the album KC and the Sunshine Band
- B-side: "You Don't Know"
- Released: February 11, 1975
- Genre: Disco; funk; R&B
- Length: 3:21 (single version); 5:19 (album version)
- Label: TK
- Songwriters: Harry Wayne Casey; Richard Finch
- Producers: Harry Wayne Casey; Richard Finch

KC and the Sunshine Band singles chronology
"I'm a Pushover" (1974)	"Get Down Tonight" (1975)	"Shotgun Shuffle" (1975)

Official audio
- "Get Down Tonight" on YouTube

"Get Down Tonight" is a song by American disco and funk band KC and the Sunshine Band, released in February 1975 by TK Records as the first single from their second and self-titled album (1975). The song became widely successful, becoming the first of their five No. 1 hits on the US Billboard Hot 100. It also reached the top of the Billboard Hot Soul Singles chart and was an international chart hit, reaching No. 1 in Canada and charting in Australia (No. 44), Belgium (No. 11), the Netherlands (No. 5), and the UK (No. 21). In 2022, Rolling Stone ranked "Get Down Tonight" number 100 in their list of the "200 Greatest Dance Songs of All Time".

== Composition ==
The song displays some of the signature characteristics of the disco era such as a fast tempo and repeating lyrics. It also features a distinctive introduction, employing a guitar solo rendered at double-speed. The song was originally titled "What You Want Is What You Get" before KC changed the title to "Get Down Tonight".

== Personnel ==
Credits adapted from the liner notes of the 1975 album KC and the Sunshine Band, on which "Get Down Tonight" originally appeared.

- Harry Wayne Casey – keyboards, vocals
- Richard Finch – bass guitar, drums, percussion
- Robert "Shotgun" Johnson – drums
- Jerome Smith– guitar
- Fermin Goytisolo – percussion
- Oliver C. Brown – percussion
- Ken Faulk – trumpet
- Vinnie Tanno – trumpet
- Mike Lewis – tenor saxophone (Note: Some sources additionally credit Lewis, with Harry Wayne Casey, as horn arranger.)
- Whit Sidener – baritone saxophone
- Beverly Champion – background vocals
- Margaret Reynolds – background vocals
- Jeanette Williams – background vocals

== Sampling ==
In 1998, the song was sampled by the house production act Bamboo for the hit single "Bamboogie". It reached No. 2 in the UK Singles Chart in January 1998.

== Legacy ==
In October 2000, VH1 ranked "Get Down Tonight" number 12 in their list of "100 Greatest Dance Songs". In July 2022, Rolling Stone ranked it number 100 in their list of the "200 Greatest Dance Songs of All Time".

== Charts ==
=== Weekly charts ===
Chart (1975)	Peak position
Australia (Kent Music Report)	44
Belgium (Ultratop 50 Flanders)	13
Canada Top Singles (RPM)	1
Netherlands (Dutch Top 40)	5
Netherlands (Single Top 100)	5
UK Singles (Official Charts)	21
US Billboard Hot 100	1
US Hot Disco Singles (Billboard)	6
US Hot Soul Singles (Billboard)	1
US Cash Box Top 100	1
US Record World Singles	1

=== Year-end charts ===
Chart (1975)	Rank
Brazil (ABPD)	21
Canada Top Singles (RPM)	29
Netherlands (Dutch Top 40)	74
Netherlands (Single Top 100)	62
US Billboard Hot 100	65
US Hot Soul Singles (Billboard)	3
US Cash Box Top 100	33

== Certifications ==
Region	Certification	Certified units/sales
Australia (ARIA)	Gold	35,000^{‡}
Canada (Music Canada)	Gold	75,000^{^}
New Zealand (RMNZ)	Gold	15,000^{‡}
United States (RIAA)	Platinum	1,000,000^{‡}
^{^} Shipments figures based on certification alone.^{‡} Sales+streaming figures based on certification alone.

== See also ==
- List of Billboard Hot 100 number-one singles of 1975
- List of Cash Box Top 100 number-one singles of 1975
- List of number-one R&B singles of 1975 (U.S.)
- List of number-one singles of 1975 (Canada)
