= KC and the Sunshine Band =

American soul and funk band

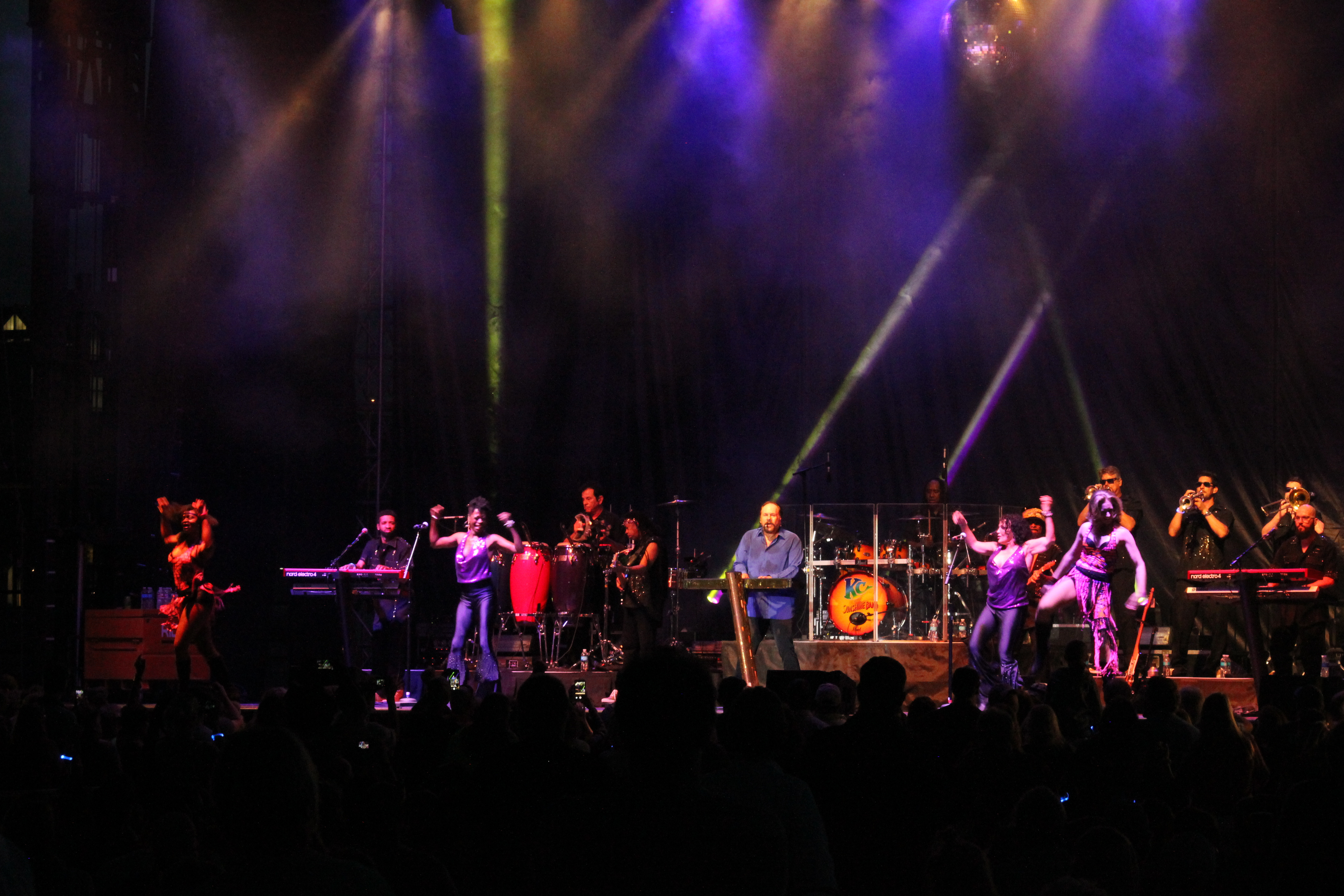
- KC and the Sunshine Band performing at Loessfest in Council Bluffs, Iowa, in 2017

Background information
- Origin: Miami, Florida, U.S.
- Genres: Funk; disco; R&B; blue-eyed soul
- Works: KC and the Sunshine Band discography
- Years active: 1973–1984; 1991–present
- Labels: TK; RCA Victor; Epic; Meca; ZYX; Sony BMG; Sony; Sunshine Sound Productions
- Members: Harry Wayne Casey; Maria De Crescenzo; Anika Ellis-Mungin; Fermin Goytisolo; David Simmons; Nyne; Stephen Lashley; John Reid; Cisco Dimas; Miles Fielder; Felipe Lamoglia; Michael Joy; Christopher Lane; Nadia Albulet; Tarian Green
- Past members: Richard Finch; Jerome Smith; Robert Johnson; Oliver C. Brown; Mike Lewis; Vinnie Tanno; Eugene Timmons; Ken Faulk; Jeannette Wright; Margaret Reynolds; Tim Pitchford; Noah Bellamy; Denvil Liptrot; Beverly Champion; Jeffrey Reeves; Slick Aguilar
- Website: heykcsb.com

KC and the Sunshine Band are an American disco and funk band that was founded in 1973 in Miami, Florida. Their best-known songs include the hits "Get Down Tonight", "That's the Way (I Like It)", "(Shake, Shake, Shake) Shake Your Booty", "I'm Your Boogie Man", "Keep It Comin' Love", "Boogie Shoes", "Please Don't Go", and "Give It Up". The band took their name from lead vocalist Harry Wayne Casey's last name ('KC') and the 'Sunshine Band' from KC's home state of Florida, the Sunshine State. The group had five number-one singles on the Billboard Hot 100 chart: four in the 1970s and the first number one song of the 1980s.

== History ==
=== 1970s ===
The band was formed in 1973 by Harry Wayne Casey (KC), who was a record store employee and part-timer at TK Records in Hialeah, Florida. The band was originally called KC & The Sunshine Junkanoo Band because KC used studio musicians from TK and a local Junkanoo band called the Miami Junkanoo Band. During this time, bassist Richard Finch had been engineering records for TK, which is how the Casey-Finch musical collaboration began. They were soon joined by guitarist Jerome Smith and drummer Robert Johnson, both TK studio musicians.

The first few songs, "Blow Your Whistle" (September 1973) and "Sound Your Funky Horn" (February 1974), were released as singles, and did well enough on the U.S. R&B chart and overseas that TK wanted a follow-up single and album. The first album Do It Good was released on April 12, 1974. In the meantime, while working on demos for KC & the Sunshine Band, the song "Rock Your Baby" (George McCrae) was created. Written by Casey, it featured Smith on guitar and became a number one hit in 51 countries in mid-1974. The band's "Queen of Clubs", which featured uncredited vocals by McCrae, was a hit in the UK, peaking at number 7, and they went on a tour there in 1975.

KC and other band members were frequent guests on WHYI-FM, branded as Y-100, one of southeast Florida's more powerful FM pop stations, that covered Dade and Broward Counties and beyond. This gave the band significant hometown exposure, during the rise of the disco genre in one of its epicenters.

The release of the self-titled second album KC and the Sunshine Band in 1975 spawned the group's first major U.S. hit with "Get Down Tonight". It topped the R&B chart in April and hit number one on the Billboard Hot 100 in August. The group received two nominations at the 18th Annual Grammy Awards held in February 1976. "That's the Way (I Like It)" also became a number one hit in November 1975. The 1976 album Part 3 yielded two number one singles: "I'm Your Boogie Man" and "(Shake, Shake, Shake) Shake Your Booty". For the latter, the group received a nomination at the 19th Annual Grammy Awards. Another hit, "Keep It Comin' Love" (1977), peaked at number two in the US.

Their success continued with their fifth album from 1979, containing their last chart topping single "Please Don't Go" which hit number one for one week in January 1980.

=== 1980s ===
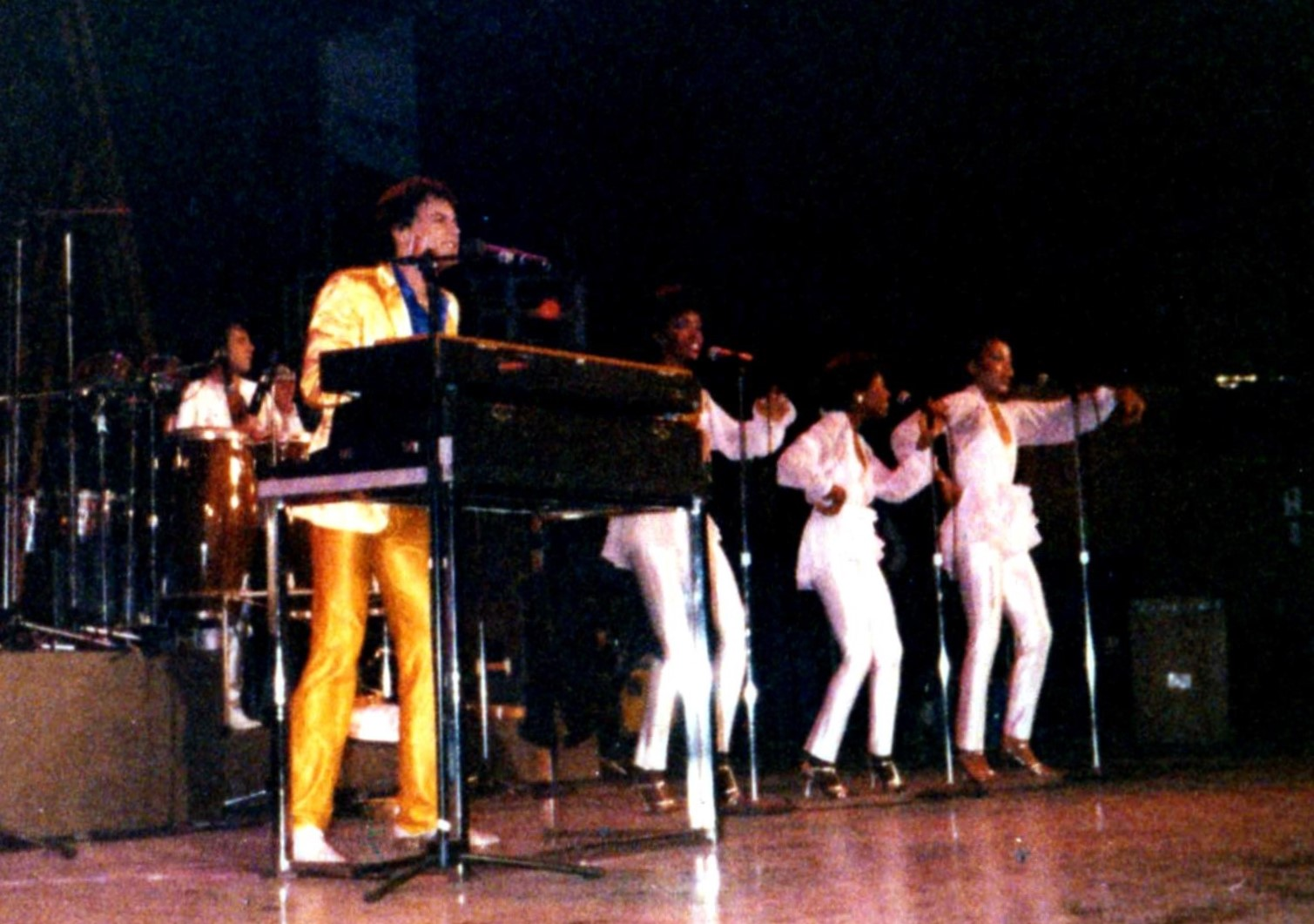
KC & The Sunshine Band live in Chile 1981

"Please Don't Go" was the first Billboard number one hit of the 1980s. With the explosion of new wave music and the declining popularity of disco, the group explored other styles and changed labels, joining Epic Records in 1980 after TK Records went bankrupt. With a change in styles, Casey enjoyed success, dueting with Teri DeSario with "Yes, I'm Ready", which hit number 2 in March 1980; the adult contemporary sound was much different from his disco hits of the 1970s, and his first major success away from the Sunshine Band.

In 1981, the partnership between Finch and Casey came to an acrimonious end. Two years after the release of the previous album, K C released a solo album: Space Cadet Solo Flight (1981). and again under the band's name the album The Painter . These albums did not chart, but in 1982, with All in a Night's Work a track called "Give It Up" brought a return to success, first in the UK. U.S. Epic Records, however, refused to issue the song as a single. Because of this, a frustrated Casey formed Meca Records, releasing the single himself on this label in a final attempt to garner the song some success in America. It worked, the song was a Top 40 hit (one year later, in 1983, in the U.S.), but the next album on Meca, late 1983's KC Ten still failed to meet expectations. This led to the group falling into stasis around 1984 with Casey's retirement.

=== 1990s ===
A revival of interest in disco music in 1991 brought Casey out of retirement. He reformed the band with some new members and two other original members, (percussionist Fermin Goytisolo and vocalist Beverly Champion-Foster) and began touring once again. The new band has released a large number of compilation albums through Rhino Records, along with some newly recorded material. The album Oh Yeah! was released in 1993 after a ten-year gap between new albums (excluding compilations).

=== 2000s and beyond ===
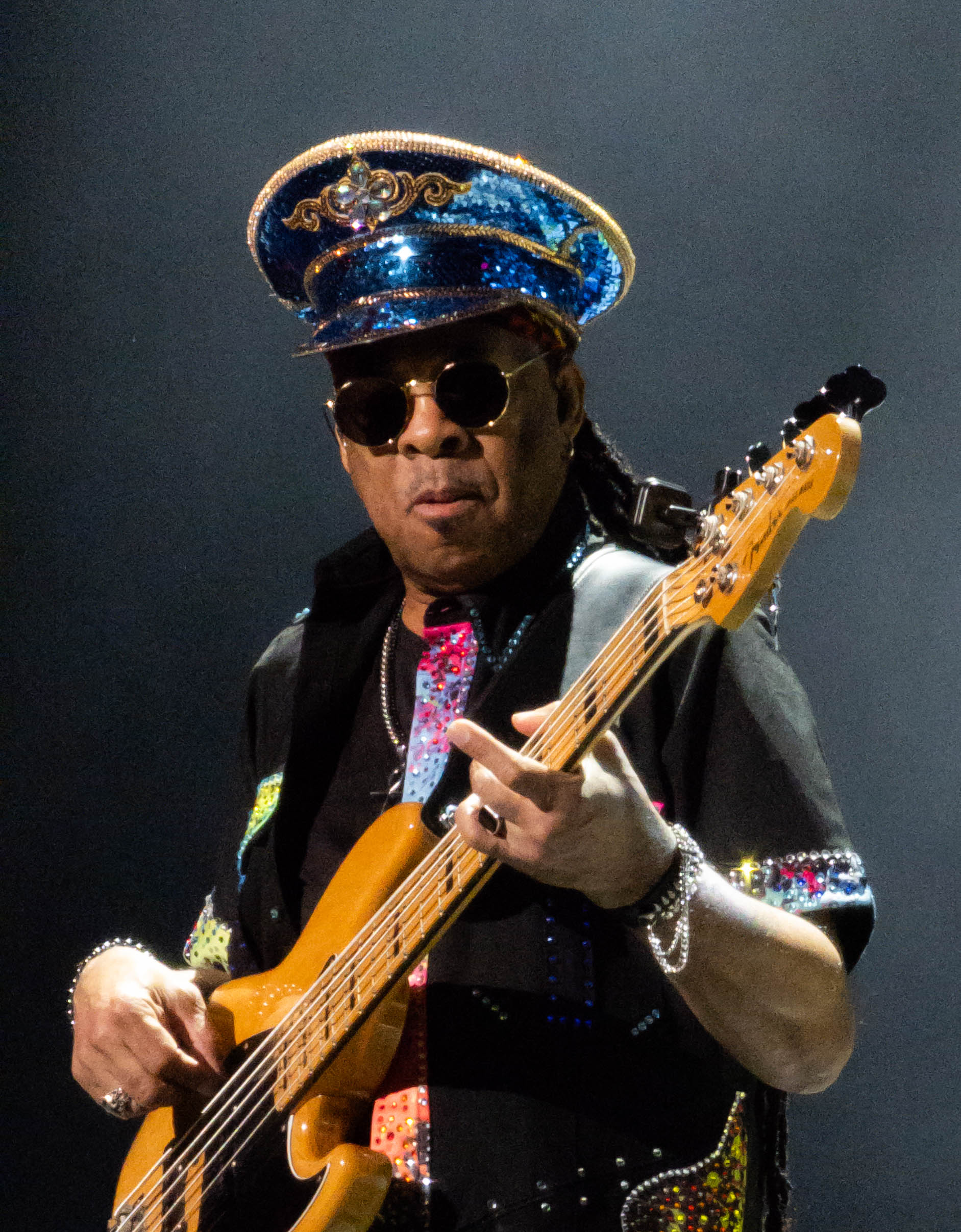
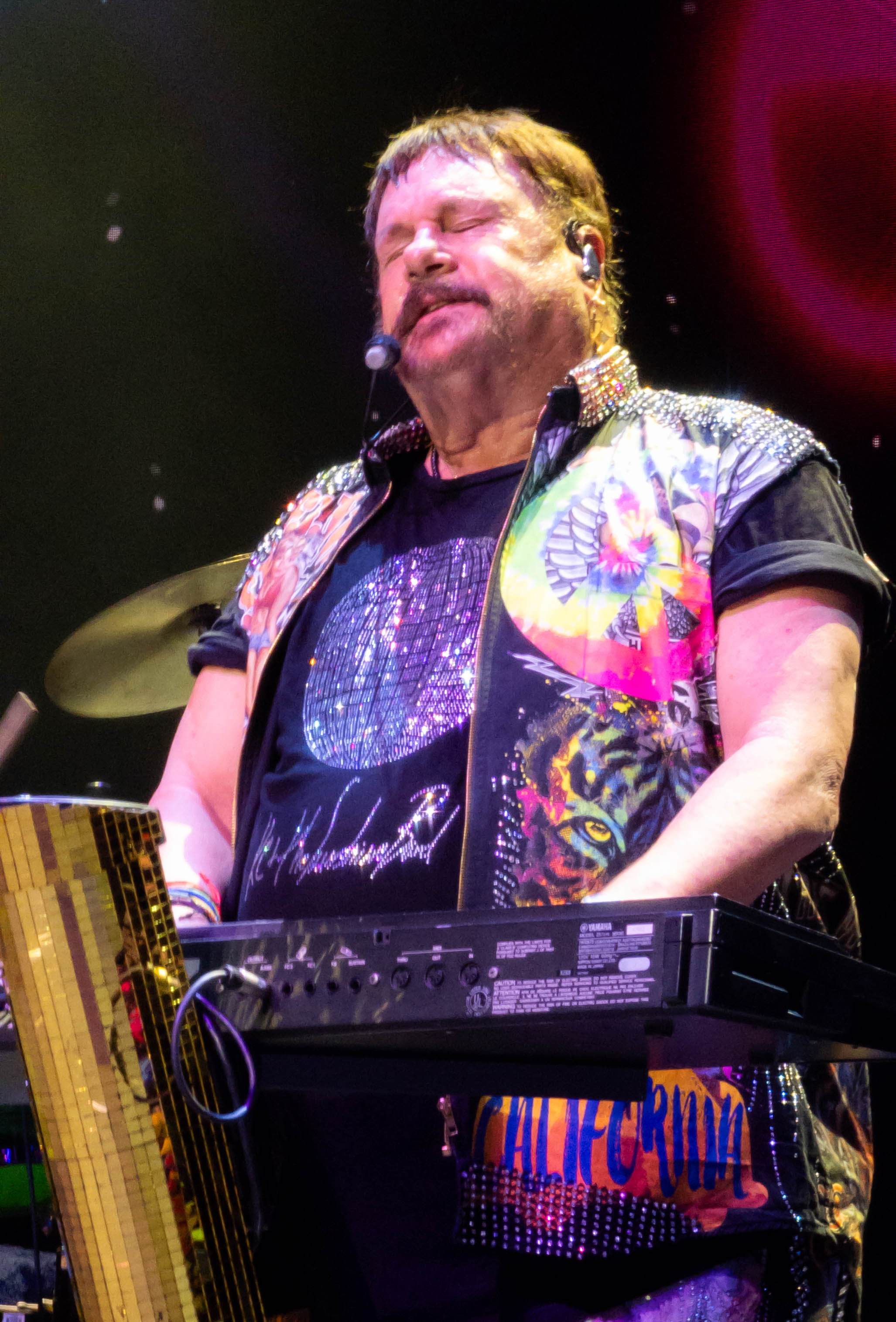
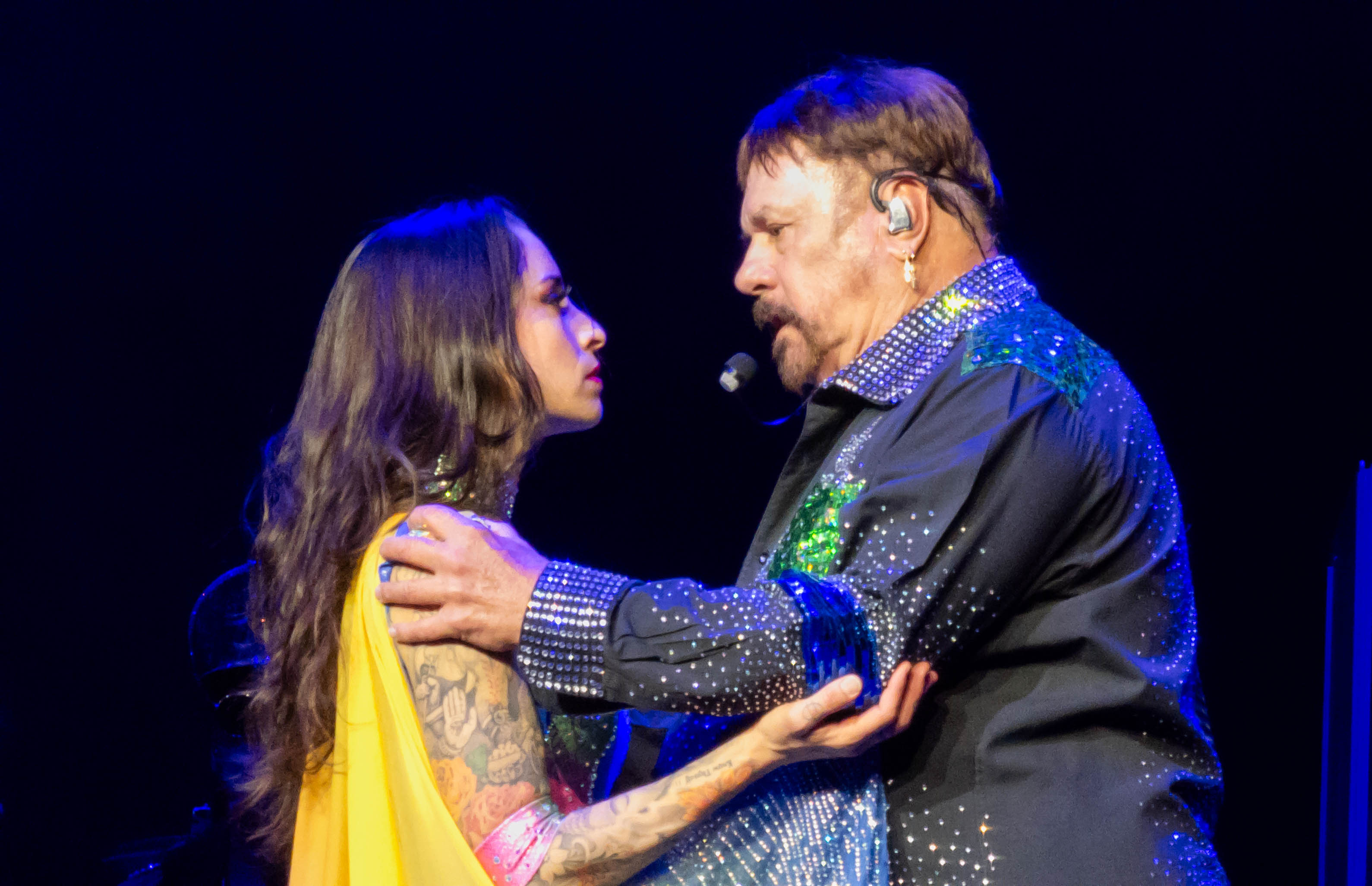
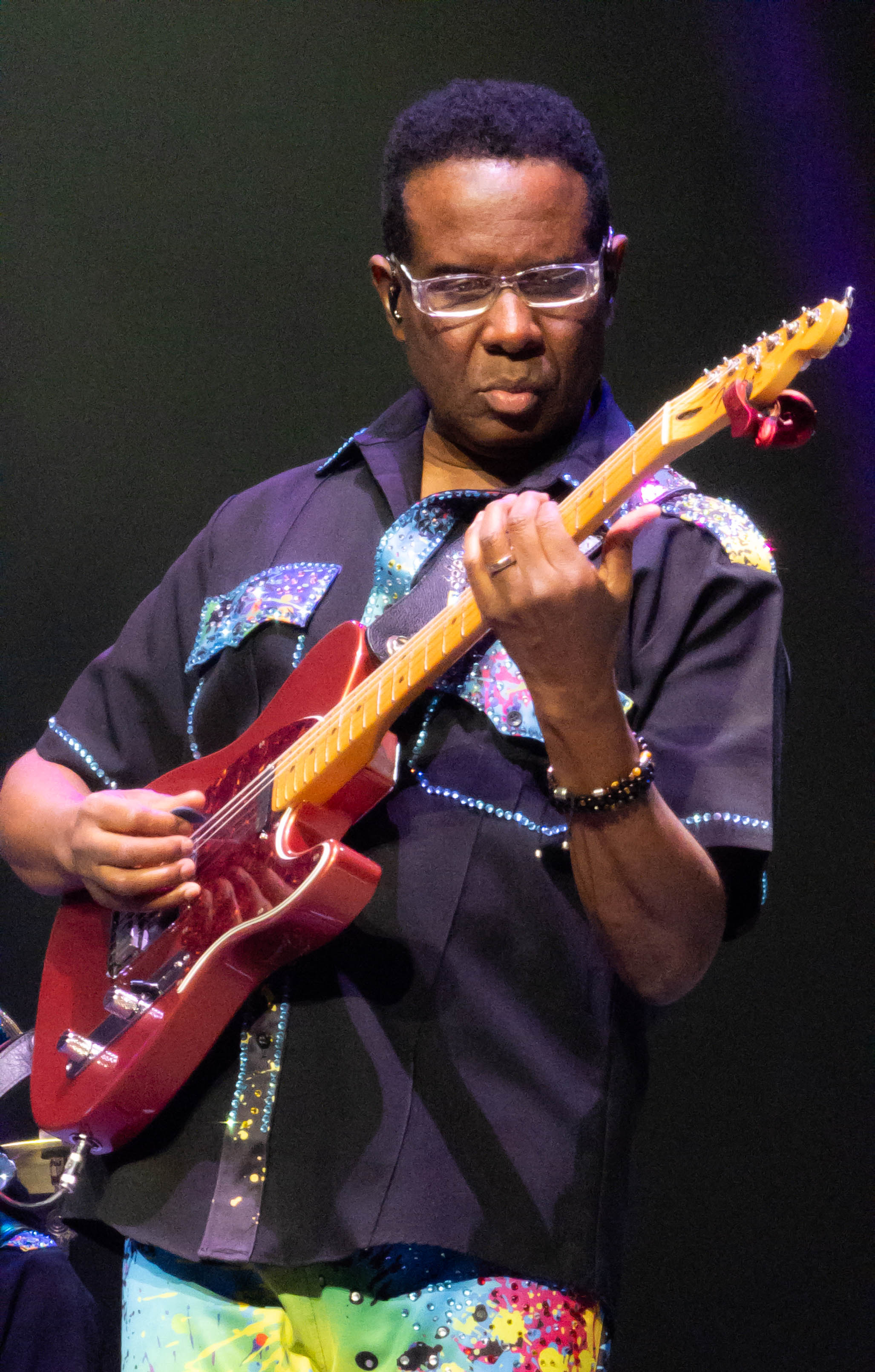
KC and the Sunshine Band performing in 2025

On July 28, 2000, guitarist Jerome Smith died while working as a bulldozer operator.

On August 2, 2002, KC and the Sunshine Band were given a Star on the Hollywood Walk of Fame.

In 2001 and 2007, the band released the albums I'll Be There For You and Yummy. Both were composed of archived material recorded before their hiatus.

They appeared in the 2003 remake of the movie The In-Laws.

On July 6, 2013, KC and the Sunshine Band were honored with a Golden Palm Star on the Palm Springs Walk of Stars.

On July 1, 2024, the KC and the Sunshine Band Musical Who Do Ya Love? premiered at the Edinburgh Festival Fringe. A reworked version of the musical was scheduled to transfer to the Charing Cross Theatre in London's West End in September 2025 under the name Get Down Tonight.

== Discography ==
- Do It Good (1974)
- KC and the Sunshine Band (1975)
- The Sound of Sunshine (1975)
- Part 3 (1976)
- Who Do Ya (Love) (1978)
- Do You Wanna Go Party (1979)
- Space Cadet Solo Flight (1981)
- The Painter (1981)
- All in a Night's Work (1982)
- KC Ten (1983)
- Oh Yeah! (1993)
- I'll Be There for You (2001)
- Yummy (2007)
- Feeling You! The 60's (2015)
- A Sunshine Christmas (2015)

== Personnel ==
- Harry Wayne Casey - lead vocals, keyboards
- Maria De Crescenzo - background vocals
- Anika Ellis-Mungin - background vocals
- Fermin Goytisolo - percussion
- David Simmons - drums
- Nyne - musical director, keyboards, background vocals
- Stephen Lashley - bass
- John Reid - trumpet
- Cisco Dimas - trumpet
- Miles Fielder - trombone
- Felipe Lamoglia - saxophone
- Michael Joy - keyboards, background vocals
- Christopher Lane - guitar, background vocals
- Nadia Albulet - dancer
- Tarian Green - dancer

== KC and Finch songs ==
These are some of the songs that H.W. Casey and Richard Finch wrote for other artists:

- "Rock Your Baby" (1974) - George McCrae, pop number one
- Dance Across the Floor (1978) - Jimmy "Bo" Horne
- "Get Happy" (1978) - Jimmy "Bo" Horne
- "Gimme Some" (1978) - Jimmy "Bo" Horne
- "I Wanna Go Home with You" (1978) - Jimmy "Bo" Horne
- "Don't Worry about It" (1978) - Jimmy "Bo" Horne
- "It's Your Sweet Love" (1978) - Jimmy "Bo" Horne
- "Let Me" (1978) - Jimmy "Bo" Horne
- "Ask the Birds and the Bees" (1978) - Jimmy "Bo" Horne
- "You Get Me Hot" (1979) - Jimmy "Bo" Horne
- "Goin' Home for Love"(Foster/Casey/Finch/Horne) (1979) - Jimmy "Bo" Horne
- "I Get Lifted" (1979) - Jimmy "Bo" Horne
- "Without You" (1979) - Jimmy "Bo" Horne
