= Harry Wayne Casey =

American musician and record producer (born 1951)

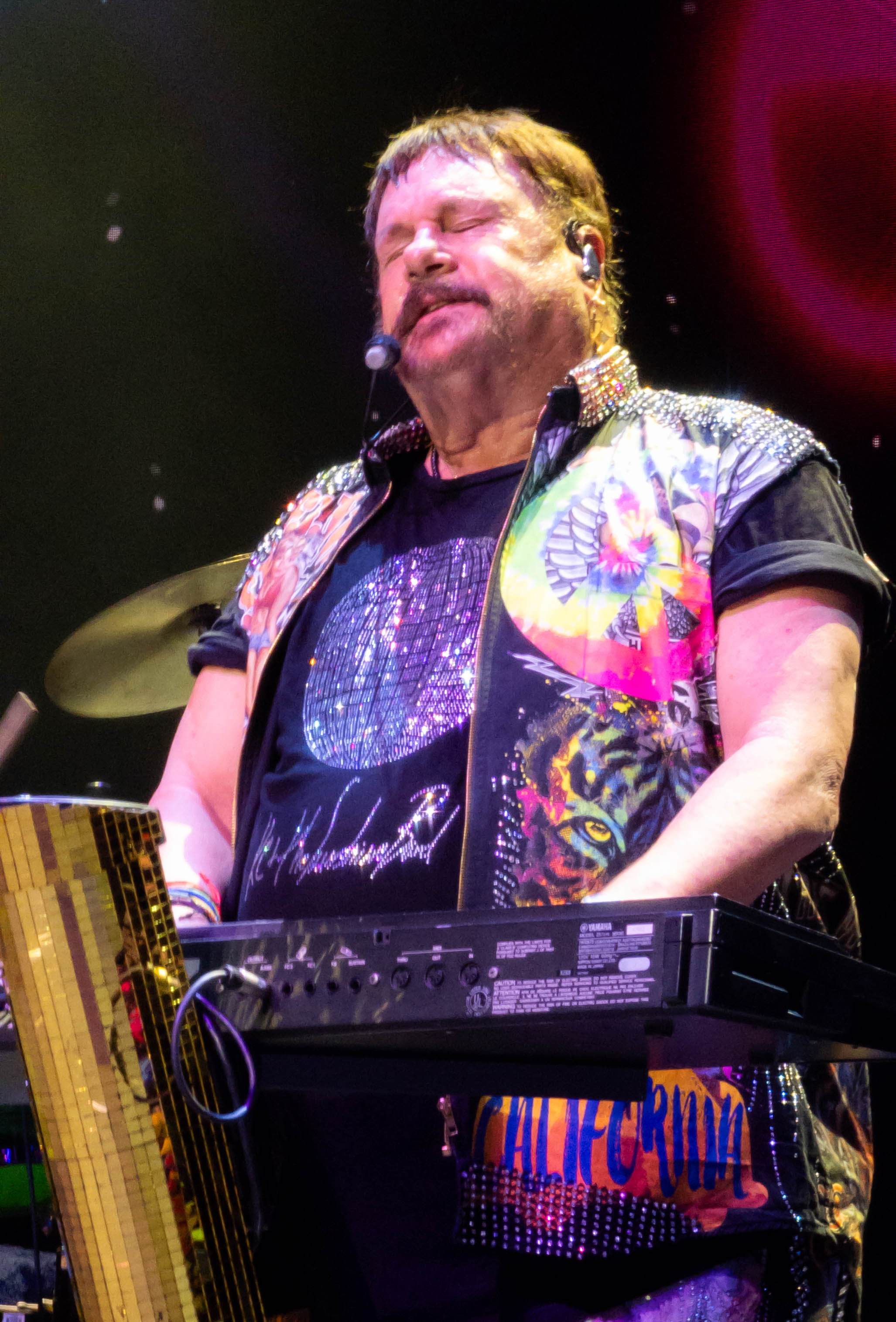
- Casey in 2025

Background information
- Also known as: KC
- Born: January 31, 1951 (age 75); Opa-locka, Florida, U.S.
- Origin: Hialeah, Florida, U.S.
- Genres: Disco; funk; blue-eyed soul; R&B
- Occupations: Record producer; musician; songwriter
- Instruments: Vocals; keyboards
- Years active: 1973–present
- Member of: KC and the Sunshine Band
- Website: heykcsb.com

Harry Wayne Casey (born January 31, 1951), better known by his stage name KC, is an American record producer, musician, and songwriter. He is best known for his band, KC and the Sunshine Band. Casey has enjoyed success and recognition as a producer of several hits for other artists, and as a pioneer of the disco genre of the 1970s.

== Biography ==
He grew up in Hialeah, Florida, and graduated from Hialeah High School in September 1969.

In January 1981, he survived a serious car crash when another car hit his vehicle head-on. He was left partially paralyzed for six months, and had to relearn how to walk, dance, and play the piano, but by the end of the year he was back in the recording studio.

In the 1990s and 2000s, he split his time between Miami Lakes, Florida, and Durham, North Carolina.

== Discography ==
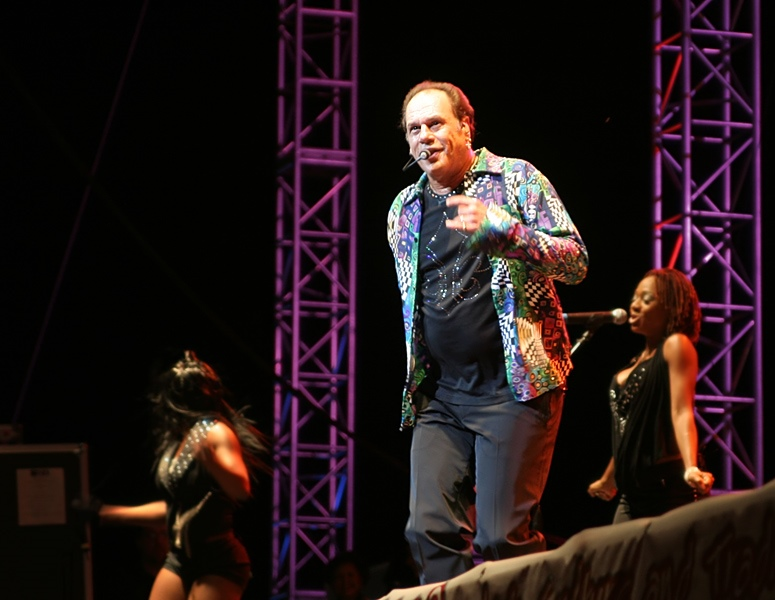
KC and the Sunshine Band performing in 2006

- Do It Good (1974)
- KC and the Sunshine Band (1975)
- The Sound of Sunshine (1975)
- Part 3 (1976)
- Who Do Ya Love (1978)
- Do You Wanna Go Party (1979)
- Space Cadet Solo Flight (1981) [Solo]
- The Painter (1981)
- All in a Night's Work (1982)
- KC Ten (1983) [Solo]
- Oh Yeah! (1993)
- I'll Be There for You (2001)
- Yummy (2007)

== Selected compilations ==
- Greatest Hits, Vol. 1 (1980) (compilation)
- The Best of KC and the Sunshine Band (1990) (compilation)
- Greatest Hits Vol. 2 (1990) (compilation)
- KC and the Sunshine Band...and More (1994)
- Part 3... and More (1995)
- Get Down Live! (1995) (live)
- Shake, Shake, Shake and Other Hits (1997)
- I'm Your Boogie Man and Other Hits (1997)
- Yummy in My belly (1998) (live)

== As songwriter ==
Songwriter: Harry Wayne Casey & Richard Finch

- "Rock Your Baby" (1974) - George McCrae
- "Gimme Some" (1975) - Jimmy "Bo" Horne
- "Dance Across the Floor" (1978) - Jimmy "Bo" Horne
- "Get Happy" (1978) - Jimmy "Bo" Horne
- "I Wanna Go Home with You" (1978) - Jimmy "Bo" Horne
- "Don't Worry About It" (1978) - Jimmy "Bo" Horne
- "It's Your Sweet Love" (1978) - Jimmy "Bo" Horne
- "Let Me" (1978) - Jimmy "Bo" Horne
- "Ask the Birds and the Bees" (1978) - Jimmy "Bo" Horne
- "You Get Me Hot" (1979) - Jimmy "Bo" Horne
- "Goin Home for Love" (Foster/Casey/Finch/Horne) (1979) - Jimmy "Bo" Horne
- "I Get Lifted" (1979) - Jimmy "Bo" Horne
- "Without You" (1979) - Jimmy "Bo" Horne

== See also ==
- TK Records
- Henry Stone
- Hamilton Bohannon
