= TK Records =

1972–1981 American record label

- Parent company: Henry Stone Music
- Founded: 1972
- Founder: Henry Stone & Steve Alaimo
- Defunct: 1981
- Distributors: Henry Stone Music; Rhino Entertainment/Parlophone (since 2013; Sunnyview catalog)
- Genre: Various
- Country of origin: United States
- Location: Hialeah, Florida

TK Records was an American independent record label founded by record distributor Henry Stone and Steve Alaimo in 1972. and based in Hialeah, Florida. The record label went bankrupt in 1981.

"TK" was inspired by the initials of sound engineer Terry Kane, who built a recording studio in the attic of Stone's office in Hialeah.

TK Records is closely associated with the early rise of disco music. In May 1974, the label released the US Billboard Hot 100 No. 1 hit "Rock Your Baby" by George McCrae, cited as one of the earliest examples of disco. A little more than a year after McCrae's hit, the record label struck gold with KC & The Sunshine Band, releasing five singles that reached No. 1 on the Billboard Hot 100: including "Get Down Tonight", "That's the Way (I Like It)", "(Shake, Shake, Shake) Shake Your Booty", "I'm Your Boogie Man", and "Please Don't Go". The KC & The Sunshine Band single "Keep It Comin' Love" reached No. 1 on Billboard's erstwhile Hot Soul Singles chart and No. 2 on the Billboard Hot 100.

TK had numerous subsidiary labels, which included Cat Records, Drive Records, Wolf Records, and Bold Records. At one point, they had established a gospel label named Gospel Roots. Artists signed to TK Records and its subsidiaries included Betty Wright, Clarence Reid a.k.a. Blowfly, The Beginning of the End (Alston); Timmy Thomas, Benny Latimore (Glades); Peter Brown (Drive); Foxy, Kracker, T-Connection (Dash); Jimmy "Bo" Horne (Sunshine Sound); Little Beaver, Gwen McCrae (Cat); Bobby Caldwell (Clouds); and Anita Ward (Juana).

In 1980, TK Records encountered financial problems and the label was acquired by Morris Levy's Roulette Records; a merger of the two labels created Sunnyview Records, which had success with the electro hip hop group Newcleus. The last single to be released on TK Records was "Weird Al" Yankovic's "Another One Rides the Bus" (1981), based on Queen's song "Another One Bites the Dust". In 1986, Henry Stone formed Hot Productions with Paul Klein and continued to re-release the TK Records catalog on CD until Sunnyview's acquisition by EMI-Rhino in 1989. Rhino owns the North American rights to the Sunnyview/TK catalog; internationally, the catalog was managed by EMI until 2013, when Rhino's newly acquired sister label Parlophone took over after Warner Music Group's purchase of the remaining EMI assets.

On October 12, 2013, Henry Stone received a proclamation from Hialeah's then-mayor, Carlos Hernandez, declaring it TK Records Day every year on October 12.

== Wolf Records (subsidiary) ==
Wolf Records was a jazz subsidiary that released only three albums, each produced by Joel Dorn:

- 1976: Encourage the People – Robin Kenyatta
- 1977: After the Dance – Harold Vick
- 1978: Innocence – Kenny Barron

There is a present-day Austrian record label of the same name that was founded in 1982 and specializes in releasing blues music.

== See also ==
- List of record labels
