= KWS =

KWS may stand for:

- KWS (band)
  - KWS (album), the band's eponymous 1992 album
- Kawasaki Station, JR East station code
- Kenny Wayne Shepherd, American blues guitarist
- Kenya Wildlife Service
- Keynesian Welfare State
- Kids Web Services, and online age-verification system
- KingsWay School, an Integrated Christian School in Orewa, New Zealand.
- Kuno Wildlife Sanctuary
- KWS Saat, a German plant breeding company
