= Neal Howard =

- Genres: Acid house
- Occupation(s): DJ, recording engineer
- Labels: FutureSound Records; Network Records

Neal Howard is a retired producer and DJ from Illinois. His 1990 single "Indulge" charted at number 97 on the UK Singles Chart.

== Biography ==
Howard was born in Rockford, Illinois, spending the late 1980s and early 1990s living in Chicago. He was raised on R&B and early hip-hop; further inspiration came from Ron Hardy, Lil' Louis, Mike "Hitman" Wilson, Herb Kent, Jazzy Jeff, and Kid Capri.

Howard's first EP, To Be or Not to Be, was released by FutureSound Records and contained mixes by Bad Boy Bill, Kevin Saunderson, and Derrick May. It was backed by "The Gathering (Club Mix)" and "The Gathering (Pain Mix)"; according to the liner notes of Terry Farley Presents Acid Rain, which contains both tracks, the B-side is frequently (and erroneously) misprinted as "To Be or Not to Be (The Gathering Club Mix)". The Gathering was featured on FabricLive.31 and appeared twice on Joey Negro's 2007 compilation album Back in the Box; once in its unmixed form, once re-edited by Negro.

Howard's second EP, Indulge, was picked up for release by UK label Network Records. Backed with "To Be or Not to Be", Indulge was Network's first release, and charted at #97 on the UK Singles Chart in 1990. Indulge would later be sampled by Altern-8 for "Re-Indulge" from their 1992 album Full On... Mask Hysteria and by X-Press 2 for "The Ending" on their 2002 album Muzikizum.

In the 1990s, Howard retired from being an artist and returned to Rockford, opening a studio in his basement. He became one of the city's top DJs and is involved in the Rockford music scene as a recording and mixing engineer. He has since worked in Los Angeles, Las Vegas, and South Korea.
