= Full On... Mask Hysteria =

Studio album by Altern 8
- Released: 13 July 1992
- Studio: Blue Chip Studios, LA Song Studios
- Length: 75:21
- Label: Network Records, Rough Trade
- Producer: Altern-8

Altern 8 chronology
| The Rhythm of Life (1989) | Full On... Mask Hysteria (1992) | Old Skool Euphoria (2001) |

Singles from Full On... Mask Hysteria
- 1. "Infiltrate 202" Released: 1991; 2. "Activ 8 (Come with Me)" Released: 1991; 3. "Frequency" Released: 1991; 4. "Evapor 8" Released: 1992; 5. "Hypnotic St-8" Released: 1992

Professional ratings
Review scores
| Source | Rating |
|---|---|
| AllMusic | 4/5 stars |

Full On... Mask Hysteria is the second studio album by British duo Altern 8. It was released on 13 July 1992 and featured six of the act's first seven singles released in 1991 and 1992. The vinyl release included "Free Limited Edition 12" Exclusive Megamix" of the album which featured "Shame '92" with Evelyn 'Champagne' King and remix of "Move My Body" by Joey Beltram. The 2008 CD reissue included remix of "Infiltrate 202" by Joey Beltram. In 2016 the "Remastered Edition" of the album was released as a set of three 12" vinyl records and for digital downloading and streaming on their official website. The Remastered Edition featured remixes by KiNK, Shadow Dancer, 2 Bad Mice and Luke Vibert.

== Track listing ==
All tracks are written by Mark Archer and Chris Peat, except for "Re-Indulge" (Mark Archer/Chris Peat/Neal Howard).

LP (TOP LP1)
| No. | Title | Length |
|---|---|---|
| 1. | "Move My Body" | 4:56 |
| 2. | "Infiltrate 202" | 4:06 |
| 3. | "E-Vapor-8" (vocals by P.P. Arnold) | 5:19 |
| 4. | "8's Revenge" | 4:29 |
| 5. | "Frequency" | 5:27 |
| 6. | "Hypnotic ST-8" | 5:23 |
| 7. | "Activ-8" | 5:32 |
| 8. | "Brutal-8-E" | 5:48 |
| 9. | "A D-8 With Plezure" | 5:54 |
| 10. | "Armageddon" | 5:49 |
| Total length: | | 54:13 |

Bonus 12" Megamix (ST-8)
| No. | Title | Length |
|---|---|---|
| 1. | "The Full On Megamix Of Full On .. Mask Hysteria" | 10:50 |
| 2. | "Shame '92 (Altern 8 Versus Evelyn 'Champagne' King)" | 5:30 |
| 3. | "Move My Body (Joey Beltram Remix)" | 4:32 |
| Total length: | | 20:52 |

Cassette (TOP MC1)
| No. | Title | Length |
|---|---|---|
| 1. | "Move My Body" | 4:56 |
| 2. | "Infiltrate 202" | 5:36 |
| 3. | "E-Vapor-8" | 5:19 |
| 4. | "8's Revenge" | 4:29 |
| 5. | "Frequency" | 5:27 |
| 6. | "Real Time Status" | 4:47 |
| 7. | "Hypnotic St-8" | 5:23 |
| 8. | "Activ-8" | 5:32 |
| 9. | "Brutal-8-E" | 5:48 |
| 10. | "A D-8 With Plezure" | 5:54 |
| 11. | "Armageddon" | 5:49 |
| 12. | "Give It To Baby" | 4:47 |
| Total length: | | 01:03:47 |

CD (TOP CD1)
| No. | Title | Length |
|---|---|---|
| 1. | "Move My Body" | 4:56 |
| 2. | "Infiltrate 202" | 5:36 |
| 3. | "E-Vapor-8" | 5:19 |
| 4. | "8's Revenge" | 4:29 |
| 5. | "Frequency" | 5:27 |
| 6. | "Real Time Status" | 4:47 |
| 7. | "First Of May" | 5:12 |
| 8. | "Hypnotic St-8" | 5:23 |
| 9. | "Activ-8" | 5:32 |
| 10. | "Brutal-8-E" | 5:48 |
| 11. | "A D-8 With Plezure" | 5:54 |
| 12. | "Armageddon" | 5:49 |
| 13. | "Give It To Baby" | 4:47 |
| 14. | "Re Indulge" (written by Neal Howard) | 6:12 |
| Total length: | | 1:15:21 |

2008 CD Reissue Bonus Track (TOP CD1X)
| No. | Title | Length |
|---|---|---|
| 15. | "Infiltrate 202 (Joey Beltram Remix)" | 3:51 |
| Total length: | | 1:19:12 |

2016 Reissue (ALTERN8)
| No. | Title | Length |
|---|---|---|
| 1. | "E-Vapor-8" | 5:27 |
| 2. | "Give It To Baby" | 4:47 |
| 3. | "Armageddon (KiNK Remix)" | 7:32 |
| 4. | "Infiltrate 202" | 5:31 |
| 5. | "Move My Body" | 4:55 |
| 6. | "Activ-8 (Shadow Dancer Remix)" | 5:23 |
| 7. | "Hypnotic St-8" | 5:24 |
| 8. | "Everybody (2 Bad Mice Remix)" | 5:50 |
| 9. | "First Of May" | 5:16 |
| 10. | "Activ-8" | 5:33 |
| 11. | "Frequency (Luke Vibert Remix)" | 5:49 |
| 12. | "Brutal-8-E" | 5:49 |
| 13. | "Frequency" (Rework of original Hallucin-8 Mix) | 5:41 |
| 14. | "Real Time Status" | 4:46 |
| 15. | "Re-Indulge" | 6:10 |
| 16. | "Armageddon" | 5:49 |
| 17. | "A D8 With Plezure" | 6:06 |
| 18. | "8’s Revenge" | 4:29 |
| Total length: | | 1:40:17 |

== Charts ==
Chart performance for Full On... Mask Hysteria
| Chart (1992) | Peak position |
|---|---|
| UK Albums (OCC) | 11 |
