= Ebn Ozn =

American musical duo

ĒBN-ŌZN
- Rosen and Liben of ĒBN-ŌZN

Background information
- Origin: New York City, New York, United States
- Genres: New wave, synthpop, dance, alternative, rock, hip hop, spoken word
- Years active: 1982–1985
- Labels: Elektra Records, Arista-Ariola, Wounded Bird Records, Rhino Entertainment/Warner Music Group
- Spinoffs: Dada Nada
- Members: Ned "ĒBN" Liben; Robert "ŌZN" Rosen

ĒBN-ŌZN (pronounced EEBEN-OHZEN) was an American 1980s New York-based experimental new wave synth-pop duo, composed of Ned "Ebn" Liben (Fairlight CMI programming) and Robert "Ozn" Rosen, (sung vocals, rhymes, character voices). The duo, which pioneered the sound recording technique of sampling, is best known for the 1983 hit single and award-winning music video "AEIOU Sometimes Y", the first commercially released and charted American single recorded on a computer, a Fairlight CMI, which was inducted in the Alternative Music Hall of Fame Class of 2024 as a "Masterpiece Single."

== Career ==
ĒBN-ŌZN formed in 1981 in New York City when ŌZN met ĒBN through record producer and recording artist Jay Aaron Podolnick (who later founded Villa Muse Studios in Austin, Texas). Soon they started spending time together in clubs listening to different types of dance music. Ozn was a Broadway actor/singer in the original casts of Shenandoah and Marlowe, had just come off the road from a tour of The Pirates of Penzance playing the lead opposite Karla DeVito, who was enjoying international acclaim for her work with Meat Loaf and Jim Steinman. Upon his return to NYC, he began recording hip hop demos in the Sugar Hill label style.

ĒBN was owner (along with Michael Ewing) and engineer of New York's Sundragon Recording Studios, which he created at the age of 16,. Talking Heads' debut album, Ramones' Leave Home, and David Johansen's Here Comes The Night were recorded at Sundragon. When he was 16 years old he engineered for Jimi Hendrix at the Bitter End in New York City for one night. ĒBN was also a founding member of the guitar band Riff Raff (Atco/Atlantic Records).

Mentored by legendary New York City promoter Ron Delsener, in 1983, ĒBN-ŌZN was signed to the London arm of Arista Records-Ariola by A&R wunderkind Simon Potts and to Elektra Records in New York by Bob Krasnow, which released its only LP, Feeling Cavalier, and singles plus 12-inch dance singles "AEIOU Sometimes Y" and "Bag Lady (I Wonder)" both remixed by John Luongo. The album featured a wide range of musical styles and a sense of humor throughout; it also featured Latin jazz percussion legend Tito Puente on the salsa cut "Video DJ."

The band’s self-produced single—along with Ed Steinberg (founder of RockAmerica)—"AEIOU" became an international MTV (heavy rotation) and dance club hit, reaching #20 on the Billboard Club Chart. In addition to play on alternative flagship stations such Los Angeles's KROQ and Long Island's WLIR, the single also received significant Black radio play, including Stevie Wonder's KJLH in Los Angeles and WBLS in New York City and remains an ’80s alt rock and New Music/New Wave radio music staple on dozens of streaming channels such as SiriusXM and radio programs. AllMusic wrote that the song "combines intelligence, melody, and weirdness in just the right doses. Accompanied by a video that featured the multi-braided Rosen delivering a stream-of-consciousness rap about 'this incredible Swedish girl,' and with a more serious subtext about communication, it became a bizarre club music hit."

Moby, in a July 15, 2021, appearance on Rick Rubin's podcast Broken Record, said "AEIOU Sometimes Y" is "the strangest record in the world pop music history . . . the lyrics are phenomenal, like a graduate dissertation on semiotics with a story about picking up a girl in café."

Recorded in 1981, "AEIOU" has the distinction of being the first commercial single ever recorded entirely on a computer (a Fairlight CMI) in the United States and the subsequent album, Feeling Cavalier, the first such album. It was also the first hip hop record by a white emcee to chart in the US.

The second single was the uncharacteristically earnest dance-rock track "Bag Lady", the video for which starred Emmy- and Tony Award-winning actress Imogene Coca. The single became a dance club hit, reaching the Top 40 on the Billboard Club Chart, and a minor radio hit in the US, while gaining hit status in Canada, Oceania, and Europe.

ĒBN-ŌZN toured in 1984 to support the release of Feeling Cavalier, playing predominantly on the East Coast, including sell-out shows at New York City's Beacon Theatre and the Ritz.

"AEIOU Sometimes Y" was the focus of a Beavis and Butt-head episode throughout the 1990s, and has been released on numerous "Best of the ’80s" compilation albums, as well as on Richard Blade's ’80s music channel on SiriusXM.

Feeling Cavalier was released on CD on October 17, 2006, by Wounded Bird Records.

Paramount TV rebooted Mike Judge's Beavis & Butt-Head animated series in 2022 and "AEIOU" once again was a featured music video to its 12–to-34-year-old demographics.

== Breakup and subsequent activities ==
The duo went their separate ways in 1985. ĒBN went on to work with Scritti Politti and producers Phil Ramone and Arif Mardin.

in 1988, ŌZN formed house-music act Dada Nada, working in recording studios in Los Angeles and Chicago, released on his own label, One Voice Records. Dada Nada was signed to Polydor/London and distributed independently in North America by ŌZN's One Voice Records, achieving two Top Five Billboard Magazine Dance Chart hits, "Haunted House" (1989) remixed by Mike "Hitman" Wilson and "Deep Love" (1990) remixed by Bad Boy Bill, Frankie Knuckles, and David Morales. Dada Nada, like ĒBN-ŌZN had widespread acclaim among music critics including an article entitled "The Wizard of OZN" appearing in the UK's Music Week.

ŌZN, as Dada Nada, toured large dance clubs with two backup dancers in the United States, which catered to both house-music and hip hop audiences in the early 1990s until his last performance in Chicago was marred by a gang shooting. Subsequently, he withdrew from live performing for three decades.

Ned "ĒBN'" Liben died in 1998 of a heart attack in Manhattan, New York, and is survived by his widow Sallie Moore Liben and son Max. Robert "Ozn" Rosen officially changed his name to Robert Ozn and went on to become a Hollywood script analyst, award-winning screenwriter, and producer.

ŌZN released his first Dada Nada single in many years after the Charlie Hebdo magazine terror assassinations and the Pulse Night Club terror attack "Je Suis Paris/I Am Orlando," which went to #13 on the Music Week Commercial Pop Dance Music Chart. The followup single, "We Can Feel It" hit #9 on the Music Week Dance Music Chart the following year and went Top 15 on the Billboard Magazine Dance Music Chart and Top 50 on the World Digital Chart.

In 2022 Jimmy Page, guitar history scholar Perry Margouleff (brother of Robert Margouleff), and Mitch Colby started the specialist guitar amp company "Sundragon" named in honor of the late ĒBN first recording studio Sundragon Recording.

ŌZN performed live for the first time in 32 years, making his West Coast debut, introduced by former KROQ DJ Richard Blade of SiriusXM at the Huntington Beach, California, Biergarten on July 21, 2023, as part of its ’80s Rock Star Nights series, which also included Gina Schock from The Go Gos, Josie Cotton, Romeo Void, and other notable ’80s acts.

== Discography ==
=== Albums ===
Year	Album details	Peak chart positions
Year	Album details	US
1984	Feeling Cavalier: Release date: 1984; Label: Elektra Records	185

=== Singles ===
Year	Single	Peak chart positions	Album
Year	Single	US Dance	Album
1983	"AEIOU Sometimes Y"	20	Feeling Cavalier
1984	"Bag Lady (I Wonder)"	36	Feeling Cavalier
1984	"Stop Stop Give It Up"	—	Feeling Cavalier
"—" denotes releases that did not chart
