= KWS (album) =

Studio album by KWS
- Released: 1992
- Recorded: 1991–1992
- Genre: Pop/rave
- Label: Network Records
- Producer: Chris King; Mark Gamble; Winnie Williams

Singles from KWS
- 1. "Please Don't Go" Released: April 27, 1992; 2. "Rock Your Baby" Released: 1992; 3. "Hold Back the Night" Released: 1992

Professional ratings
Review scores
Source	Rating
AllMusic	1.5/5 stars
Select	1/5 medals

KWS is the only album of British pop/rave band KWS. It was released under Network Records.

The album, released in 1992 is best known for the single "Please Don't Go" (a copy of Italian Eurodance group Double You's cover of the KC and the Sunshine Band song), which reached #1 on the UK Singles Chart and #6 on the Billboard Hot 100 on the year of its release.

Vocalists on the album include group member Delroy St. Joseph, Liz Leng, The Trammps and Vermetta Royster.

== Track listing ==
1. "Please Don't Go" - 6:12
2. "Where Will You Go When the Party's Over" - 5:09
3. "Rock Your Baby" - 5:14
4. "A Different Man" - 3:44
5. "Keep It Comin' Love" - 3:38
6. "Hold Back the Night Pt. 1" - 3:25
7. "Young Hearts Run Free" - 6:23
8. "Reach for the Sky" - 4:57
9. "Love Attack" - 5:19
10. "This Time" - 5:30
11. "Rock Your Baby" (Andrew Komis K.O. Mix) - 6:27
12. "Hold Back the Night Pt. 2" (Joey Negro K.O.K Mix) - 7:42
13. "Please Don't Go" (KWS Naples Via Nottingham Remix) - 4:58
14. "Young Hearts Run Free" (Mark Gamble Remix) - 5:39
15. "Burn Baby Burn" - 5:19
