= Rock Your Baby =

1974 song by George McCrae

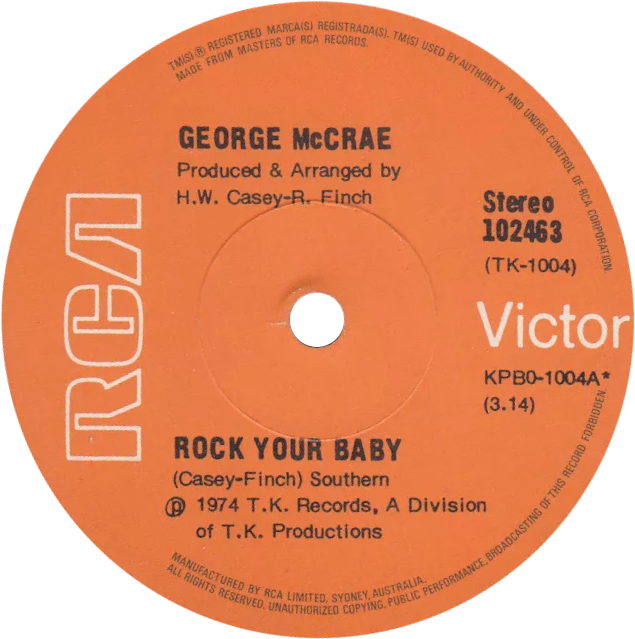
- Side A of the Australian single

Single by George McCrae

from the album Rock Your Baby
- B-side: "Rock Your Baby (Part 2)"
- Released: May 1974
- Recorded: 1973
- Genre: Disco; soul
- Length: 3:14 (7" version); 6:24 (album version)
- Label: TK; Jay Boy (UK)
- Songwriters: Harry Wayne Casey; Richard Finch
- Producers: Harry Wayne Casey; Richard Finch

George McCrae singles chronology
"Rock Your Baby" (1974)	"I Can't Leave You Alone" (1974)

Music video
- "Rock Your Baby" (TopPop) on YouTube

"Rock Your Baby" is the debut single by American singer George McCrae. Written and produced by Harry Wayne Casey and Richard Finch of KC and the Sunshine Band, "Rock Your Baby" became an early landmark recording of disco. It was the only international hit for McCrae. The song spent two weeks at number one on the US Billboard Hot 100 in July 1974, and three weeks at number one on the UK Singles Chart that same month. The song also topped the Billboard R&B chart. The single has sold over 11 million copies, making it one of fewer than forty singles to have sold 10 million physical copies worldwide.

== Composition ==
The backing track was recorded in 45 minutes as a demo, with Casey on keyboards, Finch on bass guitar and drums, and their fellow Sunshine Band member Jerome Smith on electric guitar. The song became one of the first pop hits to use a drum machine. The track was not originally intended for McCrae, but he happened to be in the studio at the time and added his distinct falsetto vocals. Music critic Robert Christgau has described the result as "irresistibly Memphis-cum-disco-with-a-hook."

== Legacy ==
"Rock Your Baby" influenced John Lennon's "Whatever Gets You thru the Night", released a few months later; in a 1975 interview, Lennon said of "Rock Your Baby" that "I'd give my eyetooth to have written that." Benny Andersson and Björn Ulvaeus have also cited the song as an inspiration for ABBA's 1976 song "Dancing Queen". In 2022, Rolling Stone ranked "Rock Your Baby" number 158 in their list of the "200 Greatest Dance Songs of All Time".

== Charts ==
=== Weekly charts ===
Chart (1974)	Peak position
Australian (Kent Music Report)	2
Austria (Austrian Singles Chart)	1
Belgium (Ultratop)	1
Canada Top Singles (RPM)	1
Canada Adult Contemporary (RPM)	1
Ireland (IRMA)	3
Italy (Musica e dischi)	1
Netherlands (Dutch Top 40)	1
New Zealand (Recorded Music NZ)	34
Norway (VG-lista)	1
South Africa (Springbok)	2
Sweden (Sverigetopplistan)	1
Switzerland (Schweizer Hitparade)	1
UK Singles (OCC)	1
US Billboard Hot 100	1
US Adult Contemporary (Billboard)	19
US Hot R&B/Hip-Hop Chart (Billboard)	1
US Cash Box Top 100	1
West Germany (GfK)	1

=== Year-end charts ===
Chart (1974)	Rank
Australia (Kent Music Report)	20
Canada (RPM)	12
Netherlands (Single Top 100)	1
Switzerland (Schweizer Hitparade)	7
UK Singles (OCC)	5
US Billboard Hot 100	38
US Cash Box Top 100	40

== Certifications ==
Certifications and sales for "Rock Your Baby"
Region	Certification	Certified units/sales
Germany (BVMI)	Gold	500,000^{^}
United Kingdom (BPI)	Gold	500,000^{^}
^{^} Shipments figures based on certification alone.

== Cover versions and remixes ==
=== The House of Love version ===
"Rock Your Baby" was covered by English indie rock band the House of Love for the 1992 compilation album Ruby Trax. British dance group KWS's cover of "Rock Your Baby" reached number eight in the UK the same year.

=== Frankfurt Mix ===
"Rock Your Baby (Frankfurt Mix)"

Single by George McCrae

from the album I Feel Love for You
- Released: January 1, 1987
- Recorded: 1986
- Genre: Disco; dance; synth-pop
- Length: 5:25
- Label: Ariola Records
- Songwriters: Harry Wayne Casey; Richard Finch
- Producers: Siegfried Ipach; Mane Bock

George McCrae singles chronology
"Let's Dance / Never Forgot Your Eyes" (1985)	"Rock Your Baby (Frankfurt Mix)" (1987)	"That's Love" (1987)

In 1986, a remix version was released, with mixing by Paul Hardcastle. It was adapted to suit the decade. This version is also included in the compilation Super Power Hit Sensation.

==== Track listing ====
- 12" Maxi
1. Rock Your Baby [Frankfurt Mix] – 5:25
2. Ooh Baby – 3:57

==== Charts ====
Chart (1987)	Peak position
UK Singles (OCC)	92
West Germany (GfK)	42

=== KWS version ===
"Rock Your Baby"

Single by KWS

from the album KWS
- Released: August 10, 1992
- Length: 5:14
- Label: Network
- Songwriters: Harry Wayne Casey; Richard Finch
- Producers: Chris King; Winnie Williams; Mark Gamble

KWS singles chronology
"Please Don't Go" (1992)	"Rock Your Baby" (1992)	"Hold Back the Night" (1992)

In August 1992, British dance music act KWS released their take on the song as a single by Network Records. It appeared on their only album, KWS (1992). Their version charted within the top 10 in Ireland and the United Kingdom, peaking at number six and eight, respectively. In Australia and New Zealand, the single entered the top 40.

==== Track listing ====
- CD maxi
1. "Rock Your Baby" (Boogaloo Investigator mix) – 3:29
2. "Rock Your Baby" (Thumb A Ride mix) – 5:19
3. "A Different Man" (Bubblegum Breakthrough mix) – 3:42
4. "Game Boy" (Rhythmatic remix) – 5:37

==== Charts ====
===== Weekly charts =====
Chart (1992)	Peak position
Australia (ARIA)	38
Europe (Eurochart Hot 100)	22
Ireland (IRMA)	6
New Zealand (Recorded Music NZ)	32
UK Singles (Official Charts)	8
UK Airplay (Music Week)	8
UK Dance (Music Week)	11
UK Club Chart (Music Week)	88
UK Indie (Music Week)	1

===== Year-end charts =====
Chart (1992)	Position
UK Singles (OCC)	100

==== Release history ====
Region	Date	Format(s)	Label(s)	Ref.
United Kingdom	August 10, 1992	7-inch vinyl; 12-inch vinyl; CD; cassette	Network	
Australia	September 28, 1992	12-inch vinyl; CD; cassette	Network	
