= Please Don't Go (KC and the Sunshine Band song) =

1979 single by KC and the Sunshine Band

- Side A of the US single

Single by KC and the Sunshine Band

from the album Do You Wanna Go Party
- B-side: "I Bet'cha Didn't Know That"
- Released: July 12, 1979
- Genre: Disco
- Length: 3:43
- Label: TK
- Songwriters: Harry Wayne Casey; Richard Finch
- Producers: Harry Wayne Casey; Richard Finch

KC and the Sunshine Band singles chronology
"Do You Wanna Go Party" (1979)	"Please Don't Go" (1979)	"Yes, I'm Ready" (1980)

Performance video
- "Please Don't Go" by KC and the Sunshine Band (at Top Pop) on YouTube

"Please Don't Go" is a song written by Harry Wayne Casey and Richard Finch, then members of American disco and funk band KC and the Sunshine Band, and released as the second single from the band's sixth album, Do You Wanna Go Party (1979). Cover versions of the song that reached the top songs charts were recorded by Double You, by KWS (both in 1992), and by Basshunter (in 2008).

== Original version ==
Originally written in the key of D flat, the song was the band's first sentimental ballad. In the song, the subject pleads for a second chance. Shortly after the song's one-week run at number one, the group broke up and Harry Wayne Casey began a solo career.

The song was part of a double-sided single; the flip slide "I Betcha Didn't Know That" was released to R&B stations and reached number 25 on the R&B chart.

=== Chart performance ===
The song was the first number-one hit of the 1980s on the US Billboard Hot 100. It was also an international chart hit—it was a number-one hit on the Australian ARIA Charts, the band's sixth and final number-one hit in Canada on the RPM national chart as well as their fifth and final number-one hit on the Billboard Hot 100 chart. The song also charted in Belgium, Ireland, the Netherlands, New Zealand, Norway, the United Kingdom, and West Germany.

=== Charts ===
==== Weekly charts ====
Chart (1979–1980)	Peak position
Australia (Kent Music Report)	1
Belgium (Ultratop 50 Flanders)	9
Canada Top Singles (RPM)	1
Ireland (IRMA)	5
Italy (Musica e dischi)	15
Netherlands (Dutch Top 40)	6
Netherlands (Single Top 100)	7
New Zealand (Recorded Music NZ)	3
Norway (VG-lista)	4
South Africa (Springbok Radio)	1
UK Singles (Official Charts)	3
US Billboard Hot 100	1
US Adult Contemporary (Billboard)	27
West Germany (GfK)	20

==== Year-end charts ====
Chart (1980)	Rank
Australia (Kent Music Report)	10
Belgium (Ultratop)	81
Canada Top Singles (RPM)	8
South Africa (Springbok Radio)	3
UK Singles (OCC)	71
US Billboard Hot 100	19

=== Certifications ===
Certifications for "Please Don't Go"
Region	Certification	Certified units/sales
Australia (ARIA)	Gold	35,000^{‡}
United Kingdom (BPI)	Silver	250,000^{^}
^{^} Shipments figures based on certification alone.^{‡} Sales+streaming figures based on certification alone.

== Double You version ==
"Please Don't Go"
- Artwork for French releases

Single by Double You

from the album We All Need Love
- B-side: "Please Don't Go" (remix)
- Released: January 26, 1992
- Genre: Eurodance
- Length: 3:18
- Label: ZYX
- Songwriters: Harry Wayne Casey; Richard Finch
- Producer: Robyx Zanetti

Double You singles chronology
"Please Don't Go" (1992)	"We All Need Love" (1992)

Music video
- "Please Don't Go" by Double You on YouTube

Italian Eurodance group Double You released a cover version of "Please Don't Go" in 1992 by ZYX Music. Produced by Roberto Zanetti, the song earned multiple gold and platinum status and became a hit in Europe. The record was also moderately successful in North America and in the UK. In 2005, Double You released "Please Don't Go 2005" on Triple B Records in collaboration with artist Don Cartel. The single hit the Dutch Mega Top 100 chart at number 40 and the Pepsi Chart at number 38. The accompanying music video was directed by Giacomo De Simone and filmed in Massa, Italy.

=== Track listings ===
- CD maxi
1. "Please Don't Go" (radio mix) – 3:18
2. "Please Don't Go" (club mix) – 6:14
3. "Please Don't Go" (Let's Go mix) – 3:31
4. "Please Don't Go" (a cappella) – 3:18
- 7-inch single
1. "Please Don't Go" (radio mix) – 3:18
2. "Please Don't Go" (a cappella) – 3:18
- 7-inch single – France
1. "Please Don't Go" (radio mix) – 3:18
2. "Please Don't Go" (Let's Go mix) – 3:31
- 12-inch maxi – Germany, Italy, Spain, US
1. "Please Don't Go" (club mix) – 6:14
2. "Please Don't Go" (radio mix) – 3:18
3. "Please Don't Go" (Let's Go mix) – 3:31
4. "Please Don't Go" (a cappella) – 3:18
- 12-inch maxi – France
1. "Please Don't Go" (club mix) – 6:14
2. "Please Don't Go" (Let's Go mix) – 3:31
- CD maxi and 12-inch maxi – Remixes
1. "Please Don't Go" (Herbie remix) – 5:20
2. "Organ Dream" – 2:15
3. "Please Don't Go" (Underground mix) – 4:55
4. "Please Don't Go" (Dub Go) – 1:45
- CD maxi and 12-inch maxi – Techno remixes
1. "Please Don't Go" (U.S.-Rave mix) – 6:00
2. "Please Don't Go" (UK-Break mix) – 5:00
3. "Please Don't Go" (Euro-house mix) – 4:55

=== Charts ===
==== Weekly charts ====
Chart (1992)	Peak position
Austria (Ö3 Austria Top 40)	2
Belgium (Ultratop 50 Flanders)	1
Canada Dance/Urban (RPM)	2
Finland (Suomen virallinen lista)	8
France (SNEP)	2
Germany (GfK)	3
Italy (Musica e dischi)	5
Netherlands (Dutch Top 40)	1
Netherlands (Single Top 100)	1
Spain (AFYVE)	1
Sweden (Sverigetopplistan)	9
Switzerland (Schweizer Hitparade)	2
UK Singles (OCC)	41
UK Dance (Music Week)	10
UK Club Chart (Music Week)	8
US Dance Club Play (Billboard)	25
US Maxi-Singles Sales (Billboard)	23

==== Year-end charts ====
Chart (1992)	Position
Austria (Ö3 Austria Top 40)	11
Belgium (Ultratop)	81
Brazil (Crowley)	59
Europe (Eurochart Hot 100)	7
Germany (Media Control)	7
Netherlands (Dutch Top 40)	10
Netherlands (Single Top 100)	3
Sweden (Topplistan)	63
Switzerland (Schweizer Hitparade)	6

=== Certifications ===
Certifications and sales for "Please Don't Go"
Region	Certification	Certified units/sales
France (SNEP)	Gold	125,000
Germany (BVMI)	Gold	250,000^{^}
^{^} Shipments figures based on certification alone.

== KWS version ==
"Please Don't Go"
- Artwork for UK and most overseas releases

Single by KWS

from the album KWS
- A-side: "Game Boy" (double A-side)
- Released: April 1992
- Genre: Dance; house
- Length: 3:39
- Label: Network
- Songwriters: Harry Wayne Casey; Richard Finch
- Producers: Chris King; Winston Williams

KWS singles chronology
"Please Don't Go" / "Game Boy" (1992)	"Rock Your Baby" (1992)

A sound-alike cover of Double You's arrangement was released in April 1992 as the debut single by the British group KWS and hit number one on the UK Singles Chart for five weeks in May 1992 and reached number six on both the US Billboard Hot 100 and Cash Box Top 100 charts in October that year. In Germany, the song reached No. 7 but disappeared out of the German Singles Chart the following week due to legal issues with Double You, who covered the song before. Due to this fall, "Please Don't Go" is the song with the highest position that dropped out of the country's singles chart the following week.

KWS's version was recorded and released after record company Network Records failed to secure UK distribution rights for the Double You version. KWS band member Chris King heard the Double You version in a club in early 1992, and, bringing together the other KWS members to form the band, decided to cover it "like the Love Affair covered Robert Knight's 'Everlasting Love' or David Parton covered Stevie Wonder's 'Isn't She Lovely'." The similarity between the versions resulted in Network paying compensation to Roberto Zanetti, Double You's producer, following three years of legal action.

The KWS version was dedicated in honour of Nottingham Forest defender Des Walker, who was on the verge of signing for Italian team Sampdoria. In the UK, it was issued as a double A-side with "Game Boy"; King recalled: "We wanted something new and Game Boy was my son's favourite games console at the time. There were various mixes on the 12-inch single with silly names like "Afternoon of the Rhino", which had been the title of a northern soul single by Mike Post."

=== Release ===
The single was featured in a news story by a local TV station in Nottingham, the UK. BBC Radio 1 soon made it "Record of the Week" and it climbed from number 30 in the UK Singles Chart to number nine and then in its third week to number one, which is when the group first performed it on Top of the Pops. They performed it five times on the show, one week upsetting Elton John by using Dressing Room 1, relegating John to Dressing Room 2.

During the weeks that the song was number one on the UK Singles Chart, SL2's "On a Ragga Tip", Guns N' Roses' "Knockin' on Heaven's Door", Shut Up & Dance's "Raving I'm Raving" and Kris Kross' "Jump" each occupied the number two slot.

The song was certified gold by the British Phonographic Industry.

After the song reached 500,000 sales in the UK, the Nottinghamshire County Council honoured KWS with a civic reception.

=== Critical reception ===
Joseph McCombs of AllMusic was mixed in his retrospective assessment of the KWS cover, writing that: "The bright vocals, synth bleeps, and predictable house groove that drove 'Please Don't Go' to the top of the charts wear thin quickly." Larry Flick from Billboard magazine described the song as a "house-induced cover" and noted further that the beats "are hard enough to fill dancefloors, but are brightened by radio-friendly vocals and slick synths." Amy Linden from Entertainment Weekly gave it a B−, adding that the song "is loaded with Hi-NRG beats, shake-your-groove-thing vibes, and a couple of originals straight out of Saturday Night Fever. All you need are the disco ball and a white suit."

In 2017, BuzzFeed ranked the song number 52 in their list of "The 101 Greatest Dance Songs of the '90s". In 2025, Classic Pop magazine ranked it number 18 in their list of "Top 20 No.1s that owed a debt to the 80s".

Tom Ewing of Freaky Trigger wrote in his 3/10 review of the cover: "It's hard to muster much love for 'Please Don’t Go' – a barely adequate trot through a good song" and "It's a good example, though, of one of the nineties least-regarded, most revival-immune style, the generic dance cover version. [...] 'Please Don’t Go' isn't quite as deathly as the king of the dance cover version, Undercover's formica take on 'Baker Street', but it’s never memorable. That this nullity got five weeks at the top [of the UK charts] says more about the immobile singles chart than any double-digit run." Ewing considers "Game Boy", the other song in the double A-side release, to be as close as the UK Singles Chart came to a hardcore number one, but nonetheless concedes that: "As 'ardkore goes, it's poor, a collection of five years of weary dance tropes in search of even one good hook – Beltram-style hoover noises, house piano, cut-up vocal samples, a dubby bassline, none of them sticking around long enough to make an impact."

=== Track listings ===
- CD maxi
1. "Please Don't Go" (Summer Mix) – 3:40
2. "Please Don't Go" (Instrumental Surf) – 6:09
3. "Game Boy" – 3:23
4. "Kollision" – 4:12

=== Charts ===
==== Weekly charts ====
Chart (1992)	Peak position
Australia (ARIA)	2
Canada Retail Singles (The Record)	1
Canada Top Singles (RPM)	27
Canada Dance/Urban (RPM)	5
European Dance Radio (Music & Media)	4
Finland (Suomen virallinen lista)	2
Germany (GfK)	7
Greece (Pop + Rock)	2
Ireland (IRMA)	3
Israel (Israeli Singles Chart)	1
New Zealand (Recorded Music NZ)	9
Spain (AFYVE)	15
Sweden (Sverigetopplistan)	8
Switzerland (Schweizer Hitparade)	11
UK Singles (Official Charts) with "Game Boy"	1
UK Airplay (Music Week)	1
UK Dance (Music Week)	4
UK Club Chart (Music Week)	10
UK Indie (Music Week)	1
US Billboard Hot 100	6
US Maxi-Singles Sales (Billboard)	25
US Cash Box Top 100	6

==== Year-end charts ====
Chart (1992)	Rank
Australia (ARIA)	7
Israel (Israeli Singles Chart)	26
Sweden (Topplistan)	52
UK Singles (OCC)	5
UK Airplay (Music Week)	10
US Billboard Hot 100	47

==== Decade-end charts ====
Chart (1990–1999)	Position
Canada (Nielsen SoundScan)	59

=== Certifications ===
Certifications and sales for "Please Don't Go"
Region	Certification	Certified units/sales
Australia (ARIA)	Platinum	70,000^{^}
Canada (Music Canada)	Gold	50,000^{^}
United Kingdom (BPI)	Gold	400,000^{^}
United States (RIAA)	Gold	500,000^{^}
^{^} Shipments figures based on certification alone.

== Basshunter version ==
"Please Don't Go"

Single by Basshunter

from the album Now You're Gone – The Album
- Released: May 19, 2008
- Genre: Dance
- Length: 2:58
- Label: Warner Music Sweden; Balloon Records
- Songwriters: Harry Wayne Casey; Richard Finch
- Producers: Basshunter; Robert Uhlmann; Scott Simons

Basshunter singles chronology
"Now You're Gone" (2007)	"Please Don't Go" (2008)	"All I Ever Wanted" (2008)

Audio video
- "Please Don't Go" on YouTube

In 2008 "Please Don't Go" was covered by Swedish musician Basshunter. The dance music song lasts two minutes and 58 seconds. It was produced by Basshunter, Robert Uhlmann and Scott Simons. "Please Don't Go" was released by Warner Music Sweden on May 19, 2008. On July 14 it was released as number three on Basshunter's third studio album Now You're Gone – The Album.

The song was originally planned to be released in the United Kingdom as the second single from Now You're Gone – The Album on June 23, 2008. However, the release was cancelled due to technical difficulties and "All I Ever Wanted" took its place on June 30. It had much more success than originally thought as the single reached number 2 in the UK charts. However, despite rumours that this would be the third single in the United Kingdom, "Angel in the Night" was released instead and was premiered on BBC Radio 1 on August 22, 2008, during Scott Mills's "Friday Floor Fillers".

Priya Elan from The Guardian described the single as europop. Editor of Popjustice compared "Please Don't Go" to "Now You're Gone" but with all the fun and spontaneity reduced to a joyless and attempt to quickly capitalise on its predecessor's success. In 2009 "Please Don't Go" was called number 43 of The 50 Worst Songs of the '00s by The Village Voice. Maura Johnston said that it stitches together the undeterred stomp of Gary Glitter's "Rock And Roll Part 2" and the keyboards of L.A. Style's "James Brown Is Dead". "Please Don't Go" debuted at number 39 on May 29, 2008, and after two weeks reached number six on Swedish singles chart. It also charted on Slovak airplay chart.

=== Track listing ===
Digital download (May 19, 2008)
No.	Title	Length
1.	"Please Don't Go (Radio Edit)"	2:58
2.	"Please Don't Go (DJ Alex Extended Mix)"	5:00
3.	"Please Don't Go (Wideboys Remix)"	5:37
4.	"Please Don't Go (Ultra DJ's Remix)"	4:39
5.	"Please Don't Go (Wideboys Edit)"	2:41

12" single (June 11, 2008)
No.	Title	Length
1.	"Please Don't Go (DJ Alex Extended Mix)"	4:58
2.	"Please Don't Go (Wideboys Remix)"	5:35
3.	"Please Don't Go (Discotronic Remix)"	5:13
4.	"Please Don't Go (Ultra DJ's Remix)"	4:37

=== Charts ===
Weekly chart performance for "Please Don't Go"
Chart (2008)	Peak position
Slovakia (Radio Top100 Oficiálna)	72
Sweden (Sverigetopplistan)	6

=== Release history ===
Date	Format	Label
May 19, 2008	Digital download	Warner Music Sweden
June 11, 2008	Twelve-inch single	Balloon Records

== See also ==
- List of Billboard Hot 100 number ones of 1980
