= Mike "Hitman" Wilson =

House musician

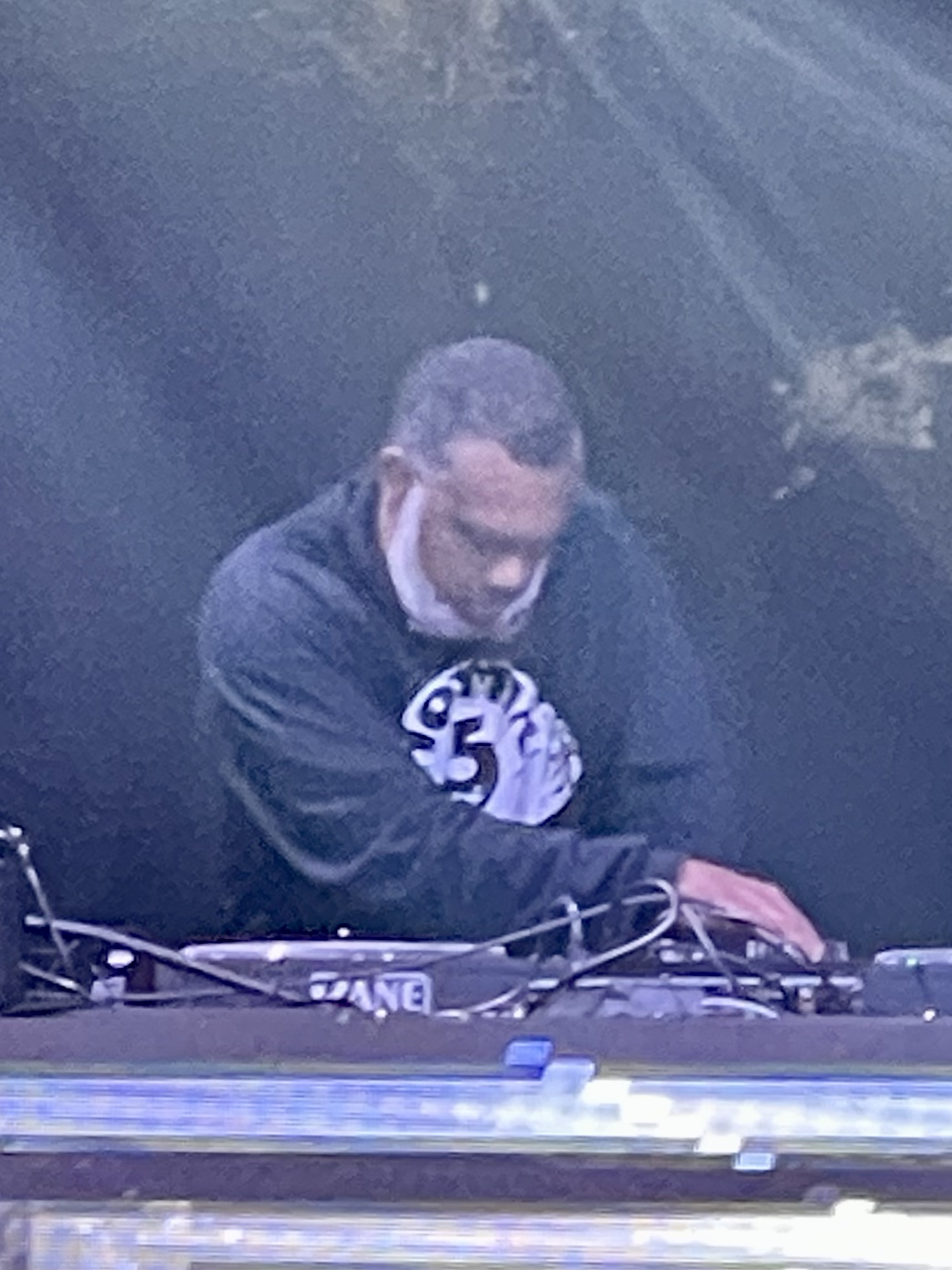
- Wilson on June 14, 2025 in Aurora, Illinois

Background information
- Born: Chicago, Illinois, U.S.
- Genres: House
- Occupations: DJ; record producer; remixer

Michael A. Wilson is an American DJ and producer from Chicago. Initially a later member of Hot Mix 5, he later diversified into production; his 1990 single, "Another Sleepless Night", charted on the UK Singles Chart at No. 74, and when re-released in 1991 credited to Shawn Christopher, charted at No. 50. He also produced works by Orchestral Manoeuvres in the Dark, New Order, Mr. Lee, 808 State, and Ghost Town DJ's, and has been named as an influence by Octave One and Neal Howard.

== Life and career ==
=== Hot Mix 5 ===
Michael A. Wilson is from Chicago. He started off as a promoter, but deputised after the club's DJ couldn't make it; enjoying the experience, he began DJing at all his parties. He became friends with Farley "Jackmaster" Funk of Hot Mix 5, a collective of DJs formed in 1981 for WBMX's Saturday Night Live Ain’t No Jive Chicago Dance Party, after inviting him to spin a set at one of them; one day Funk let Wilson deputise for him, and from that guest spot Wilson became a member of the Hot Mix 5, joining between the departure of Ralphi "Rockin" Rosario, Kenny "Jammin" Jason, and Mickey "Mixin" Oliver to WGCI-FM's copycat Jackmasters program in July 1986 and the latter's cancellation in February 1987.

While at WBMX, in order to differentiate himself as the new boy, he began reediting tracks, such as adding intros and breaks, to make them easier to mix in and out of; from this, he began remixing them. He stayed at WBMX until 1988, when Barry Mayo took over the station and fired all of its staff. He then entered the DMC World DJ Championships with his friend Bad Boy Bill; afraid of losing his reputation, he produced a number of house tracks as insurance, on the grounds that if he performed poorly, he had production to fall back on. While there, he met Tony Prince and showed him his records, which led to Prince offering him a job as a DMC producer.

=== Production ===
In 1988, Wilson and Steve "Silk" Hurley produced "Brides of Frankenstein", a Chicago house megamix of Orchestral Manoeuvres in the Dark songs, which charted at No. 7 on the American Dance Club Songs chart, and when released as the B-side to "Call My Name", charted at No. 50 on the UK Singles Chart. The following year he produced New Order's "MTO", which when released in 1989 as the B-side to "Run 2", charted at No. 49 on the UK Singles Chart, and a remix of Mr. Lee's "Get Busy", which charted at No. 41 on the UK Singles Chart.

After meeting Rick Rock at Milton Lee Olive Park's jazz festival and offering to produce him, he suggested that Wilson instead produce his mother, Shawn Christopher; Wilson met her after she played with Nick Tremulis at the Riviera Theatre. He produced "Another Sleepless Night", which was initially released in September 1990 as "Mike "Hitman" Wilson featuring Shawn Christopher", and appeared on an Arista Records compilation album; with this credit, the song charted at No. 74 on the UK Singles Chart. After the song topped the Dance Club Songs chart, Clive Davis summoned Christopher into his office, and convinced her to rerelease the song under the name "Shawn Christopher", on the grounds that she was the artist; with this credit, the song charted at No. 50 on the UK Singles Chart. Wilson also produced her subsequent work "Don't Lose the Magic", which charted at No. 30 on the UK Singles Chart.

In 1993, he remixed 808 State's "10 × 10", which charted at No. 67 on the UK Singles Chart. In 1996, he released a Club Mix of "My Boo" by Ghost Town DJ's, which popularised the song; writing in September 2022, Pitchfork's Samhita Mukhopadhyay complimented its "extended three minutes of atmospheric groove over Virgo Williams’ haunting vocals", and the publication declared his version the 74th best song of the 1990s, one of 53 R&B songs on that list. In the 2010s, Octave One and Neal Howard named him as an influence.
