= We All Need Love (song) =

Single by Double You

from the album We All Need Love
- B-side: "Remix"
- Released: 1992
- Studio: Casablanca Recordings, Italy
- Genre: Dance-pop; disco
- Length: 3:39
- Label: ZYX Music; Panic Records; Blanco Y Negro; DWA (Dance World Attack)
- Songwriter: Domenic Troiano
- Producer: Robyx Zanetti

Double You singles chronology
"Please Don't Go" (1992)	"We All Need Love" (1992)	"Part-Time Lover" (1993)

Music video
- "We All Need Love" on YouTube

"We All Need Love" is a song by Italian Eurodance group Double You, released as the second single from their debut album, We All Need Love (1992). As the follow-up to the group's cover version of "Please Don't Go", it confirmed the worldwide success of Double You. Produced by Robyx Zanetti, it peaked at number-one in Belgium and became a top-10 hit in Austria, France, Germany, Italy, Spain and Switzerland. There were various formats, including many remixes. The accompanying music video was directed by Italian director Giacomo De Simone, who has directed music videos for many other Eurodance acts, like Corona, Ice MC and Whigfield. "We All Need Love" was originally written and recorded by Canadian rock musician Domenic Troiano in 1979. It had also been covered by the Australian band Ebony in 1983, and by Karen J. Ann in 1988.

== Critical reception ==
Larry Flick from Billboard magazine commented, "After a mediocre showing in the 'Please Don't Go' battle against KWS, Italo-pop/house act lunges for crossover radio approval with a cute, retro-minded disco twirler. An anthemic chorus and old-fashioned string and piano fills give the song charm." Andy Beevers from Music Week complimented the song as "great", adding that "it has a very similar organ-driven poppy disco sound and should give them the success they deserve."

== Track listings ==
=== Original release ===
- CD maxi - Germany
1. "We All Need Love" (radio mix) — 3:39
2. "We All Need Love" (extended mix) — 6:00
3. "You Are My World" (sunshine mix) — 4:18
4. "We All Need Love" (a cappella) — 3:36
- CD maxi - France
1. "We All Need Love" (radio mix) — 3:35
2. "We All Need Love" (extended mix) — 5:55
3. "You Are My World" (sunshine mix) — 4:18
- 7" single
1. "We All Need Love" (radio mix) — 3:39
2. "We All Need Love" (a cappella) — 3:36
- 12" maxi
1. "We All Need Love" (extended mix) — 5:55
2. "We All Need Love" (radio mix) — 3:35
3. "You Are My World" (sunshine mix) — 4:18
4. "We All Need Love" (a cappella) — 3:35

=== Remixes ===
- CD maxi
1. "We All Need Love" (U.S. club mix) — 6:53
2. "We All Need Love" (U.S. radio edit mix) — 3:44
3. "We All Need Love" (extended mix) — 5:55
4. "We All Need Love" (a cappella) — 3:35
- 12" maxi - Spain, Italy
1. "We All Need Love" (euroremix) — 7:29
2. "We All Need Love" (a cappella) — 3:00
3. "We All Need Love" (U.S. remix) — 6:53
4. "We All Need Love" (U.S. radio remix) — 3:44
- 12" maxi - France
1. "We All Need Love" (euroremix) — 7:29
2. "We All Need Love" (instrumental) — 3:34
3. "Please Don't Go" (FBH remix) — 3:54
- 12" maxi - Germany
1. "We All Need Love" (U.S. club mix) — 6:53
2. "We All Need Love" (U.S. radio edit mix) — 3:44
3. "We All Need Love" (radio mix) — 3:35

=== Official versions ===
- Acapella
- Euroremix
- Extended mix
- FBH remix
- Instrumental
- Radio mix
- Sunshine mix
- US club mix / US remix
- US radio edit mix / US radio remix

=== Credits ===
- Produced by Robyx
- Written by Domenic Troiano
- Recorded and mixed at Casablanca Recordings, Italy
- Robyx Productions
- Arranged by AWF
- Artwork by Sunrise Studio
- US remixes :
  - Engineered by David "db" Benus
  - Remixed, produced and edited by Franco Iemmello
  - Recorded and mixed at Tatiana Studios, Newark, NJ
- FBH remix by Frankies Beathouse

== Charts ==
=== Weekly charts ===
Weekly chart performance for "We All Need Love"
Chart (1992–1993)	Peak position
Austria (Ö3 Austria Top 40)	8
Belgium (Ultratop)	1
Belgium (VRT Top 30 Flanders)	2
Canada Dance/Urban (RPM)	5
Ecuador (El Siglo de Torreón)	9
Europe (Eurochart Hot 100)	15
France (SNEP)	10
Germany (Official German Charts)	6
Israel (Israeli Singles Chart)	12
Italy (Musica e dischi)	5
Netherlands (Dutch Top 40)	14
Netherlands (Single Top 100)	12
Spain (AFYVE)	5
Sweden (Sverigetopplistan)	33
Switzerland (Schweizer Hitparade)	7
UK Dance (Music Week)	32
UK Club Chart (Music Week)	93

=== Year-end charts ===
1992 year-end chart performance for "We All Need Love"
Chart (1992)	Position
Europe (Eurochart Hot 100)	47
Switzerland (Schweizer Hitparade)	22

1993 year-end chart performance for "We All Need Love"
Chart (1993)	Position
Canada Dance/Urban (RPM)	39
