= Another Sleepless Night =

Another Sleepless Night may refer to:

- "Another Sleepless Night" (Anne Murray song), 1982
- "Another Sleepless Night" (Shawn Christopher song), 1990
- Another Sleepless Night, a 2001 live album by Northern Lights
- "Another Sleepless Night", a song by Before the Mourning from the album Etherial End
