= Robert Ozn =

American musician, screenwriter, producer, activist

Robert Ōzn
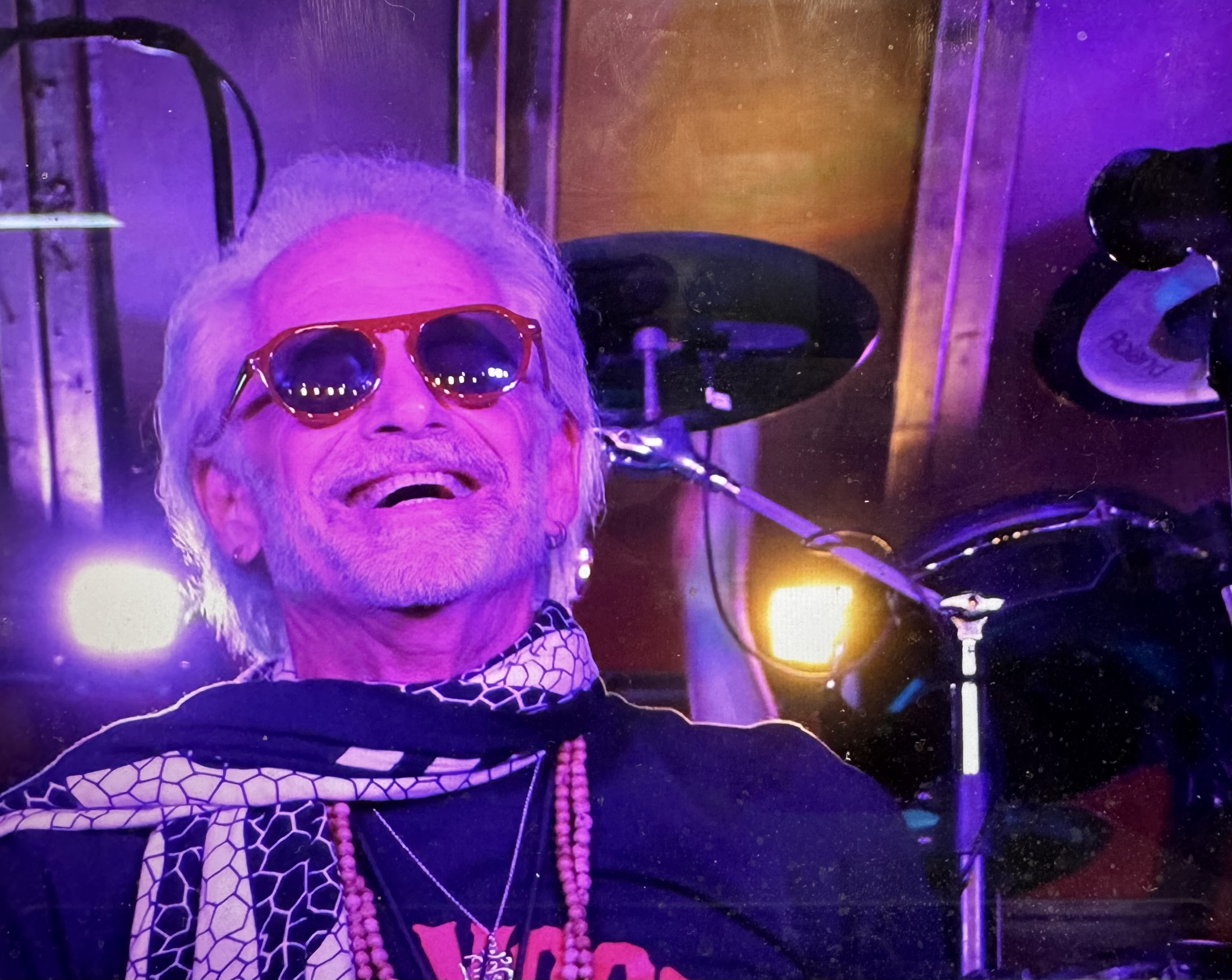
- ŌZN Live, Huntington Beach, California, 2023
- Born: Robert Mitchell Warfield Frank Rosen; New York, New York, U.S.
- Other names: ŌZN, DaDa NaDa
- Occupations: Recording Artist, Singer, Rapper, Songwriter, Record producer, Actor, Screenwriter, Film Producer
- Known for: Early pioneer of commercial computer music, sampling and the integration of sung and rapped vocals with electronica.

Robert Ōzn (born Robert Mitchell Warfield Frank Rosen, in New York City) is an American recording artist, screenwriter, producer and Broadway actor. After touring with The Tonight Show Band as a jazz singer, he created roles in the original casts of two Broadway musicals, and starred in two major musical tours (see below). After spending a year in Los Angeles where he was influenced by its vibrant punk scene, he returned to New York City finding inspiration in early 80s rap and Manhattan's downtown art and fashion scene. He gained fame as the vocal half of 1980s synth-pop duo ẼBN-ÕZN combining multiple musical genres with electronica and a unique visual presence. In the mid 80s he went on to a House Music career as a solo artist under the name Dada Nada with multiple Top Five Billboard Dance music tracks. ŌZN later co-produced and co-wrote the 2003 human rights themed feature film I Witness starring Jeff Daniels, James Spader, and Portia de Rossi.

In 2024 ĒBN-ŌZN's "AEIOU Sometimes Y" (Elektra Records, 1983), the first commercially released and charted record made with a computer in the United States, was inducted into the Alternative Music Hall of Fame as a “Masterpiece Single”

== Career ==
=== Theater and education ===
As a child soloist with the New York City Metropolitan Opera Children's Chorus, he sang in numerous productions for two seasons. At the "Old Met," he performed in its last opera performance - a production of "La Boheme" conducted by George Schick, starring Richard Tucker, Gabriella Tucci, Heidi Krall and Mario Sereni. He appeared in the opening performance of the "New Met" at Lincoln Center - "Antony & Cleopatra" - conducted by Thomas Schippers, directed by Franco Zefferelli, starring Leontyne Price and Justino Diaz.

At the age of 16, he was the youngest student to receive a Key Scholarship award from Herbert Berghof acting school (HB Studio) in Greenwich Village. At 17, he was accepted as a voice and theater major at the Indiana University Jacobs School of Music, where he studied with New York City Opera Bass/Baritone Roy Samuelson, and audited the Jazz Music Theory Class taught by composer David Baker, who later served as artistic director of the Smithsonian Jazz Masterworks Orchestra. As a member of The Jacobs School's Singing Hoosiers, he performed with songwriter Hoagy Carmichael.

As a teenager, Ōzn toured as jazz singer with Doc Severinsen and The Tonight Show Band, working with award-winning jazz instrumentalists Lew Tabackin, Ed Shaughnessy, Snookie Young, Tommy Newsom, Ross Tompkins, Buddy Rich and Mel Tormé performing a jazz fusion repertoire.

In his first professional musical theatre role, he starred as Hero in a tour of A Funny Thing Happened on the Way to the Forum with Zero Mostel.

Shortly after, he created the role of Henry Anderson in the original Broadway cast of the Tony Award winning musical Shenandoah starring John Cullum, which originally premiered at the Goodspeed Opera House. Other prominent cast members were Penelope Milford, later nominated for an Academy Award for the film Coming Home, Joel Higgins and Donna Theodore. During the show's original rehearsal and performance period at the Goodspeed, he played Laertes in a workshop of Hamlet directed by Cullum.

At the Berkshire Theater Festival he performed in "Vagabond Stars" a pre-Broadway piece with lyrics written by The Newsroom's Executive Producer/Director Alan Poul.

Moving to Los Angeles for a year (1979–1980) where he guest starred on two television programs: Eight is Enough and [[Quincy M.E.], and studied performance art, he became influenced by the punk and New Wave music scenes happening at clubs like Madame Wong's.

He then replaced Gary Sinise as Wesley in the LA company of Sam Shepard's Curse of the Starving Class.

In 1981, he returned to Broadway as one of the leads in the rock musical "Marlowe" opposite Patrick Jude and Lisa Mordente who was nominated for a Tony Award for her performance.

In 1982, he starred as Frederick in a tour of Gilbert and Sullivan's Pirates of Penzance with Karla DeVito as Mabel, who had replaced Linda Ronstadt in Joe Papp's Broadway production, and Don Stewart as the Pirate King.

His appearance as a charismatic punk rocker in the short film "No Regrets" directed by Ruth Charny, produced by the team of Ellen Sherman (Executive Producer Dateline NBC) & Gillian Gordon of Binge or Bomb?, caught the attention of New York City impresario Ron Delsner who became his mentor as a recording artist.

=== ĒBN-ŌZN and DaDa NaDa ===
In 1981, Rosen met Ned Liben, then the owner of New York's Sundragon Recording Studios. Liben had built his first professional studio at the age of 14 and by the time he met Rosen had worked with Jimi Hendrix, Talking Heads, and The Ramones.

Their initial collaboration, "AEIOU Sometimes Y" was recorded in 1981–1982 (released in 1983) and was the first American commercially released and charted record to be produced on a computer (a Fairlight CMI). "AEIOU" was a mix of rap, spoken word, digital sampling, rock and R&B dance music. Liben and Rosen cut their own 12-inch dance single, which was signed by Arista Records in London and in New York by Elektra Records' President Bob Kraznow before the band even had a name, which eventually became ĒBN-ŌZN. "AEIOU" went top 20 on the Billboard Club Chart, establishing ŌZN as one of the first white rappers in the industry. "AEIOU"'s video, a Los Angeles Times Top 10 Video of the Year, and an MTV Heavy Rotation favorite garnered wide domestic and international exposure and was featured on Beavis and Butt-head throughout the 1990s. "AEIOU" was listed in Rolling Stone Magazine's top 100 Songs of 1983.

ĒBN-ŌZN's first full-length album, Feeling Cavalier, released by Elektra in 1984, went Top 20 on the CMJ College Music Journal Radio Chart and their second single, "Bag Lady (I Wonder)" went Top 40 on the Billboard Club Chart. The video for "Bag Lady" starred Tony and Emmy Award winner Imogene Coca and like "AEIOU," received worldwide television and club play.

The duo toured the United States in 1984, appearing with Howard Jones and Missing Persons also performing in New York City at The Ritz and The Beacon Theatre.

ĒBN-ŌZN received rave reviews for their album, singles, videos and live shows. They were covered in Time magazine, People, US and The New York Post. ŌZN was declared the "greatest white rapper alive" by Playboy and called the "new American sex symbol" by the Boston Globe. ĒBN was also featured in Guitar Player magazine.

In a 2021 appearance on Rick Rubin's "Broken Record" podcast, Moby said about "AEIOU Sometimes Y":

"If you have never heard AEIOU or seen the video, I highly encourage you to do so. I would posit [AEIOU is] the strangest song in western pop music history. The lyrics are so phenomenal and they make absolutely no sense – like a grad student thesis on semiotics while a guy is talking about trying to pick up a girl at a café."

After the duo's split up in 1985, ĒBN went on to run his exclusive SOHO studio working with Scritti Politti and Arif Mardin, while ŌZN moved to Los Angeles and started his own label, One Voice Records and his own solo act, Dada Nada.

Dada Nada received a distribution deal with Polydor/UK and he distributed it himself in North America, landing two top five Billboard dance hits, "Haunted House" (the first House record by a white artist to chart in North America) and "Deep Love".

His 1991 UK release "The Good Thing/Give It All I Got", written & produced by ŌZN, Steve Wight and Bob Greenberg and mixed by Bad Boy Bill ŌZN & Steve Wight, was a two-song, 12-inch single, which as an import hit No. 3 on the Record Mirror Cool Cuts Chart and No. 25 on the Record Mirror Mainstream Dance Chart.

ŌZN'S collaborators on Dada Nada tracks included the legendary Godfather of House the late Frankie Knuckles and House Music pioneers Bad Boy Bill, David Morales, Mike "Hitman" Wilson, Steve Wight (now an associate professor of recording arts at Cal State), and Bob Greenberg.

ŌZN stepped away from public appearances after the 1990 US Dada Nada tour, which suffered a shooting incident during a show in Chicago, until 30-plus years later when he began performing again. (see below)

ĒBN died in 1998 of a heart attack in Soho, New York and is survived by his wife Sallie Moore Liben and son Max Liben, CTO and co-founder of aerospace and marine electric motor manufacturing startup H3X.

In April 2015, ŌZN announced on Facebook and Twitter that he was making his first record in 25 years inspired by the Charlie Hebdo assassinations, Je Suis Paris!. An anthem for the growing, global pro-peace, anti-terror movement, he produced and wrote the track with the late Emmy Award nominee Gabe Lopez, who wrote the score for RuPaul's Drag Race and also produced and wrote three albums with ex Go-Go's singer Belinda Carlisle. Guitars by Julian Coryell, son of jazz legend Larry Coryell and guitarist for (Alanis Morissette), Chris Golden, bass player for hip hop star Xzibit, Gibi Dos Santos Sergio Mendes's long-time Brazilian percussionist, background vocalists Mindy Jones of Moby and Mark Strom of the boy band Innovate.

Released in summer 2016 with remixes by Richard Cutmore, who at the time had ten Billboard Dance Chart #1's, House of Virus and Mntna, the record's U.K. release peaked at #13 on the Music Week UK Commercial Pop Dance Chart in October 2016, after ŌZN recorded additional vocals with the lyric "I Am Orlando" in reference to the Orlando, Florida Pulse Nightclub anti-LGBT terror attack, establishing it as an LGBT anthem through the United Kingdom. The track was never released to dance clubs in the US.

His 2017 record "We Can Feel It" reached number nine on the Music Week UK Commercial Pop Dance Chart in December 2017 and went to number 15 on the Billboard Dance Club Songs chart in February 2018 — his first American release since 1990.

In 2023, Paramount TV announced the reboot of Mike Judge's Beavis & Butt-head series and re-licensed "AEIOU Sometimes Y" as a featured music video for its 13–24 year old demographic.

=== Film ===
ŌZN went on to a producing and screenwriting career in the film business.

He worked first for free for Oliver Stone and Janet Yang's Ixtlan Films, trading his time in exchange for learning the development and production end of the movie business. He went on to become a paid first-call reader for A-list material for Stone. He was then hired at Miramax, as reader for Pulp Fiction under Oscar-winning producer Richard Gladstein and as contract development exec for much of their European fare and some of horror division Dimension Films' material. He also served as script analyst at Creative Arts Agency (CAA) on projects for Sydney Pollack, Louis Malle, Paula Weinstein and James Cameron's Lightstorm Entertainment.

ŌZN partnered with Ted Danson as executive producers to option Elegies for Angels Punks and Raging Queens, playwright Bill Russell's West End London AIDS drama, for Anasazi/Paramount Television. Danson and OZN attached Michael Douglas, Richard Gere, Patrick Stewart, Whoopi Goldberg, Jason Priestley and Elizabeth Taylor as well as Danson. However, it remains un-produced;

In 2003, ŌZN and Sony Vice-President Colin Greene's God's Witness, long on many of the industry's "favorite un-sold spec scripts" lists, was finally made as I Witness, starring Jeff Daniels, James Spader and Portia de Rossi, for which the writing team received the 2003 Method Fest Best Screenplay Award. Universal released the film in the U.S. and Canada in 2007 and HBO released it internationally.

ŌZN took a break from arts and entertainment projects to raise his children between 2003 through 2008, when he worked as the UK and French field producer (credited as Associate Producer) on the production team of "Turned Towards the Sun," a UK documentary about the British aristocrat, war hero, London Times correspondent, author and out bisexual Micky Burn. The film premiered at the British Film Institute in London in October 2012 to excellent reviews, earning director Greg Olliver a Grierson Award nomination.

ŌZN then wrote a feature for the Sy Fy Channel (credited as Robert Wescott), "Earth's Final Hours," which was produced in 2011 by Cinetel and aired in 2012.

In 2015 he served as executive producer, along with Julian Lennon of BAFTA Board member Julia Verdin's film short "Lost Girls," which won awards at the 2016 Los Angeles Independent Film Festival and IndieFEST.

=== Live Performances ===
In 2023 After a 30-plus years hiatus from live performing, ŌZN starred - along with 80s artists Gina Schock of the Go Gos, Josie Cotton and Romeo Void in an 80s music stars series alongside the 80s cover band The Reflexx in Huntington Beach, California. ŌZN was introduced by celebrity TV host and DJ [Richard Blade]].

ŌZN performed the world premiere of a new track "We Are the People" at a No Kings event held in Auditorium Shores in Austin, Texas, for 30,000 people.

== Awards and honors ==
- Alternative Music Hall of Fame Masterpiece Single Award for EBN-OZN's "AEIOU Sometimes Y" (Class of 2024 Inductee)
- Judge: Writers Guild of America Awards (longform) 2006, 2005, 2004
- LA Times Video Top 10 of the Year for EBN-OZN's "AEIOU Sometimes Y"
- Method Fest 2003 Best Screenplay for "I Witness"
- IFP Emerging Narrative Voices (Independent Feature Project) Screenplay (unproduced) 2002: Deadbeats
- City of West Hollywood's "Celebrate Bisexuality Day" September 23, 2017, Proclamation Awarded to Robert Ozn on Behalf of the Los Angeles Bi Task Force.
