= Shelley's Laserdome =

Former nightclub in Stoke-on-Trent, England

Coordinates: 52°59′11″N 2°8′14″W

- Interactive map of Shelley's Laserdome
- Location: Longton, Stoke-on-Trent, Staffordshire
- Event: Electronic music,

Construction
- Opened: July 1989
- Closed: September 1992

Shelley's Laserdome was a night club in Longton, Stoke-on-Trent, Staffordshire, England. It was at the heart of the house and rave scene in the early 1990s, helping to launch the career of DJ Sasha and featuring regular appearances from Carl Cox. It was eventually shut down by Staffordshire Police.

== History ==
Before becoming a hit with ravers, the Shelleys building had been used as a roller rink earlier in the 20th century, before becoming the Panopticon Theatre, and then later Alexandra Palace Cinema. After closing as a cinema in the fifties, it housed bingo and shops.

The club's heyday, 1990–91, saw a number of DJs at the beginnings of their careers: both Dave Seaman and Sasha were residents (Sasha was resident between September 1990 and 27 May 1991), who later found fame and success on a global scale. Other DJs who appeared included Doc Scott, Ellis Dee, Grooverider, Mickey Finn, DJ Rap, Stu Allan and local DJ Daz Willott. Legendary Rave Godfathers The Prodigy played a live PA at the club in 1991 whilst dancer Sharky was still with the band.

The first weekly night was Sindrome starting July 1990, and was run by Birmingham's Logical Promotions followed by Delight from Manchester which ran concurrently. In early 1991, the Manchester club The Haçienda was closed due to shootings by drug gangs, so when Delight began at Shelley's, its large Manchester following was brought along.

== Altern 8 video ==
Staffordshire rave duo Altern 8 shot the video for their "Activ-8 (Come With Me)" single in the Shelley's car park in September 1991. Mark Archer from Altern 8 had wanted to do a free PA in the club's car park as it would get great footage for the video of their coming single as well as giving the ravers a something to dance to. At 0300 after the club finished, the band started to perform from a lorry they had hired. There was a crowd of thousands as they had made people aware that they were performing. Footage shows the people "going mad" dancing on parked cars. This went on before it was halted by police.

== Closure ==
The club was blighted by drug dealing and regular (albeit mostly underground) violence between rival gangs. Staffordshire Police and local authorities revoked the license from management due to these issues. The club's final night was Saturday 31 October 1992.

== Shelley's reunion ==
Since around 2011, Shelley's Reunion events have been taking place in venues around the Stoke-on-Trent area. DJs that appeared at the original Shelley's such as Dave Seaman, Mark Archer from Altern 8, DJ Rap have appeared to play music from the club's heyday.

== See also ==
- List of electronic dance music venues
- List of electronic music festivals
- Live electronic music
