= Gettoblaster =

- Genres: House, ghetto house, acid house, techno
- Years active: 2014–present
- Labels: Dirtybird Records, Dirty Fabric, Guesthouse Music, In The Loop, Moody Recordings, Psycho Disco!
- Members: Paul Anthony
- Past members: Zach Bletz
- Website: iheartgetto.com

Paul Anthony and Zach Bletz, known professionally as Gettoblaster, are two American house and techno producers from Detroit (Zach) and Chicago (Paul). Chicago is known for starting the house movement while Detroit pioneered the techno scene during the late 1980s. Gettoblaster's music conserves the genres of their respective birthplaces, combining techno and house to pioneer a unique style of ghetto house music. They have collaborated with well-established artists such as Bad Boy Bill, Steve "Silk" Hurley, DJ Funk, Roland Clark, and Chip E.

== History ==
Formed in 2014 Gettoblaster released their debut LP We Jack quickly followed by the launch of their record label, We Jack. the following year with the goal of showcasing other prominent house producers such as Bad Boy Bill and DJ Deeon. 2015 also marked the release of Gettoblaster's second LP, Diamonds & Palm Trees. In 2017 Gettoblaster toured Europe, making stops in London, Amsterdam, Paris, and beyond. 2018 saw Gettoblaster touring across the United States followed by the release of their single, Get Dat, on Claude VonStroke's Dirtybird Records in 2019.

== Discography ==
=== Albums ===
2014

- We Jack - The Album

2016

- Chi Till I Die

2018

- Pineapples & Palm Trees

=== EP's ===
2014

- Gettotrax Vol 1

2015

- Back 2 The Underground EP
- Street Bleep

2016

- Find My UFO
- Club Beats

2017

- Pimpin Hoes
- Work That
- Jello Booty
- Bang to the Beat
- Beat the Box / Bang It

2018

- Bounce Back / Glock On My Strap
- Let the Beat Control My Mind EP
- Gettoblaster & Friends EP
- Future Funk

=== Singles ===
2015

- "Southside Groove ft. DJ Skip" - Gettoblaster, Andi Rivera

2016

- "Deep In The Jungle" - Gettoblaster
- "Freak Bitch" - Gettoblaster, DJ Deeon, Bitchin' Camero
- "I Need Weed In My Life ft. DJ Dagwood" - Gettoblaster
- "Look At You ft. Donnie Lesko" - Gettoblaster, ZXX
- "Street Wise" - Gettoblaster

2017

- "The Warehouse Project" - Gettoblaster
- "Turn It Up ft. Benjamin Paper" - Gettoblaster, Rescue
- "Stop & Go" - Gettoblaster
- "Bounce Dat Ass ft. Volsto" - Gettoblaster
- "Finger Bang ft. Servante" - Gettoblaster
- "Work Hard" - Gettoblaster, Rescue
- "Disco Strip Club" - Gettoblaster
- "Bang The Box ft. Robert Armani" - Gettoblaster, Nigel Richards
- "Tweeter Tot" - Gettoblaster
- "Finger Bang ft. Servante" - Gettoblaster
- "Housedog" - Gettoblaster, Fuzzy Cufflinxxx
- "Butterflies" - Colette, Gettoblaster
- "Flip The Script" - Gettoblaster
- "Work It Out" - Gettoblaster
- "Hustling For Horns" - Bad Boy Bill, Gettoblaster
- "Make Um Hurt" - Gettoblaster, KE
- "Disco Strip Club" - Gettoblaster
- "Sex By The Fire" - Gettoblaster, Mellefresh
- "Work Hard" - Gettoblaster, Rescue

2018

- "Flip The Script" - Gettoblaster
- "Bang Them Walls" - Bad Boy Bill, Gettoblaster ft. Benjamin Paper
- "Shake It" - Gettoblaster, Black Tantra
- "Knock Knock" - Gettoblaster, Fuzzy Cufflinxxx
- "Get Money" - Gettoblaster
- "I Don't Care" - Gettoblaster, Rescue
- "Butterflies" - Colette, Gettoblaster
- "Sack Of Weed" - Gettoblaster, Hatiras, Pressed & Proper
- "Hustling For Horns" - Bad Boy Bill, Gettoblaster
- "Fine Day" - Bad Boy Bill, Gettoblaster, ZXX, SKYLR
- "Goin Deep" - Gettoblaster, Missy
- "Fantasy ft. Missy" - Gettoblaster, Missy
- "Don't Stop" - Gettoblaster, Mellefresh
- "Do It" - Gettoblaster, Hazzaro
- "Be A Freak" - Gettoblaster, Stephan Granville
- "Jack To The Rhythm" - Gettoblaster, Hatiras, Black Tantra
- "What You About" - Gettoblaster, Just Alexander
- "4am" - Gettoblaster, Missy
- "Work This" - Gettoblaster, Don Rimini
- "Be A Freak" - Gettoblaster, Stephan Granville
- "What Is A Pimp?" - Gettoblaster, Hazzaro
- "Goin Deep" - Gettoblaster, Missy
- "Bounce That Shit" - Gettoblaster, ZXX, Rondell Adams

2019

- "Jack To The Rhythm" - Gettoblaster, Hatiras, Black Tantra
- "What You About" - Gettoblaster, Just Alexander
- "Get Dat" - Gettoblaster, DJ Funk

=== Remixes ===
2014

- "Work That Muthja Fucker (Gettoblaster & Robert Armani Remix)" - Steve Poindexter
- "Circus Bells (Gettoblaster & HumanTraffik Remix)" - Robert Armani
- "Ambulance (Gettoblaster Remix)" - Robert Armani

2015

- "Autograph (Gettoblaster Remix)" - Hatiras, MC Flipside
- "Barcodez (Gettoblaster Remix)" - DJ Deeon
- "Conduction (Gettoblaster & Robert Armani Remix)" - Johnny Fiasco
- "Koolaid (Gettoblaster Remix)" - Treasure Fingers
- "Do It Like This (Gettoblaster Remix)" - Defunct!

2016

- "Walking Down the Street (Gettoblaster Remix)" - Ron Carroll

2017

- "Freak Somebody (Gettoblaster & ZXX Remix)" - Fatman Scoop, Freak Fineman
- "Crush (Gettoblaster Remix)" - Colette
- "TRU Skool (Gettoblaster Remix)" - Alex Peace, Brian Boncher
- "Jens Sap (Gettoblaster Remix)" - Robert Palmero
- "Baby Wants To Ride (Gettoblaster Remix)" - Jamie Principle
- "We Feelin' It (Gettoblaster Remix)" - Vanilla Ace, Jean Bacarreza
- "It's A Love Thang (Gettoblaster & ZXX Remix)" - Paul Johnson
- "Music Is ft. Audacious Melodius (Gettoblaster & ZXX Remix)" - Ron Carroll ft. Audacious Melodius

2018

- "Jack Is in the House (Gettoblaster Remix)" - Don Rimini
- "How Low Can You Go ft. Mr. V (Gettoblaster Remix)" - Mr. V, Ramiro Bernabela
- "Jack Is in the House (Gettoblaster Remix)" - Don Rimini
- "I Just Can't (Gettoblaster Remix)" - Hatiras, Lee Wilson
- "Coke Salt (Gettoblaster Remix)" - Figio's
- "Get Get Down (Gettoblaster Remix)" - Paul Johnson
- "It's On Again ft. Good Money (Gettoblaster Remix)" - DJ Godfather
- "Big Dream (Gettoblaster & ZXX Remix)" - Ron Carroll, DJ Skip, Steve Silk Hurley, R.O.N.N, FAT V
- "Money For That (Gettoblaster, Steve Gerard, Foxhovnd Remix)" - Nick Rockwell
- "Deep House (Gettoblaster Remix)" - DJ Dagwood, Dajae
- "I Get Deep (Gettoblaster Remix)" - Roland Clark
- "T.N.T. (Gettoblaster Remix)" - Thomas Sahs

2019

- "Big Dream (Gettoblaster & ZXX Remix)" - Ron Carroll, DJ Skip, Steve Silk Hurley, R.O.N.N, FAT V
