= Chip E. =

American DJ and record producer

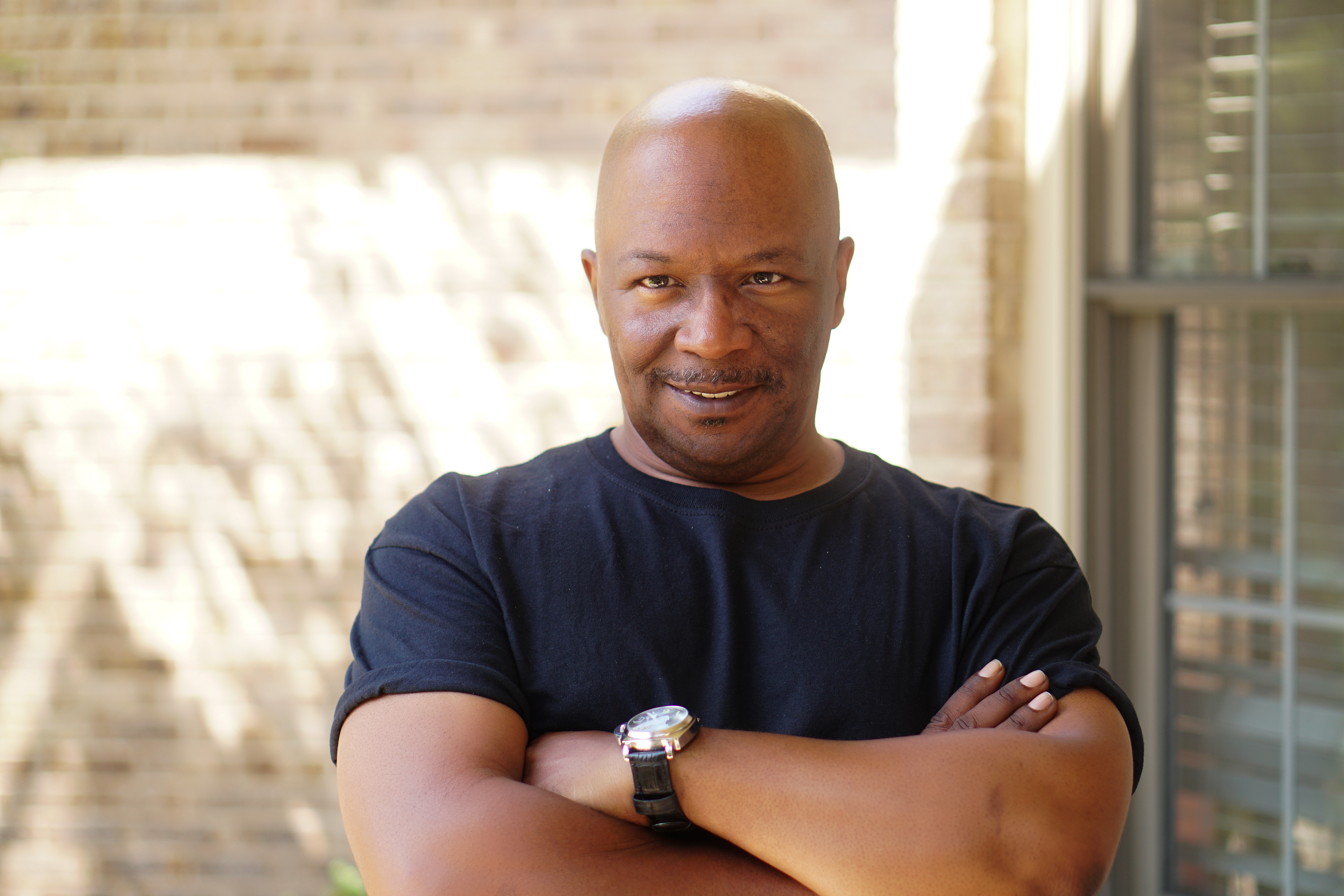
- Chip E. in c. 2018

Background information
- Born: Irwin Larry Eberhart II; 1966 (age 59–60); Chicago, Illinois, U.S.
- Genres: Pop, contemporary R&B, dance, house
- Occupations: Singer-songwriter, remixer, producer, DJ
- Years active: 1982-present
- Labels: DJ International Records, Sights & Sounds

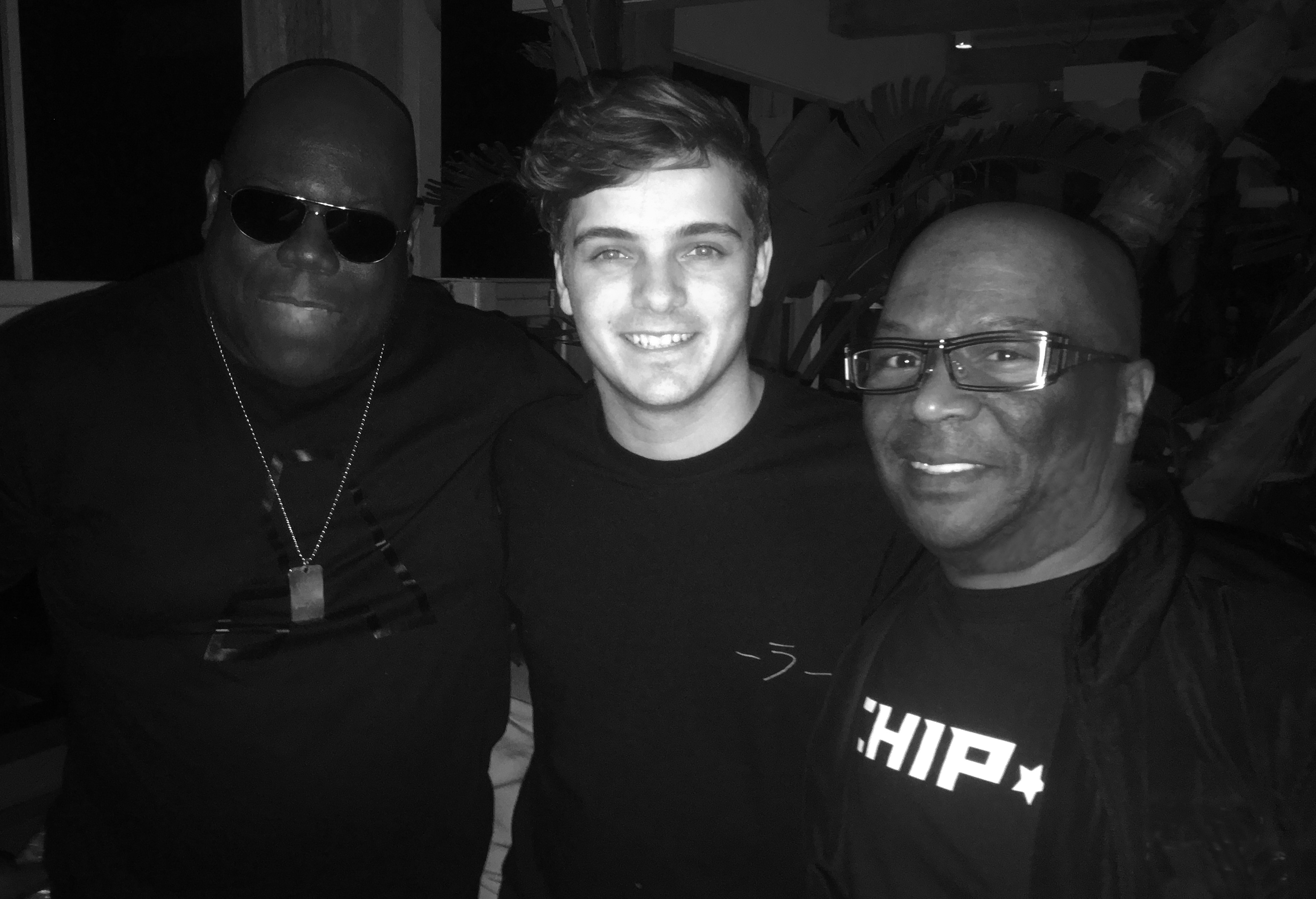
Carl Cox, Martin Garrix, Chip E. in Miami at the red carpet premier of What We Started

Irwin Larry Eberhart II, better known by his stage name Chip E. (born 1966), is an American DJ and record producer. He is one of the early artists of the then-burgeoning house music movement that began in 1980s Chicago.

== Life and career ==
Born in Chicago, Chip E. attended St. Ignatius College Prep, Kenwood Academy, Columbia College Chicago and DePaul University. He started spinning records in 1982 and by 1984 he was producing records. In November 1986 Street Mix magazine called Chip E. the "Godfather of House Music." on the cover of issue #1. In 1987, he became the first Chicago artist to be in regular rotation on all three major Chicago radio stations (WBMX, WGCI-FM and B96). Former B96 programming manager Joe Bohannon of Eddie & JoBo made the decision to add "If You Only Knew" to regular rotation and with that began the transition of the station from CHR (contemporary hit radio) to a dance music station.

Chip E's first recording Jack Trax was an extended play record that featured "Time to Jack" as well as "It's House". These songs are considered by many as the first original House records, and the first to use the terms "Jack" and "House" as they relate to the genre. Specifically, "It's House" does not contain any drum patterns, music or sampling used in any prior work in any genre of music. The infamous "Bang Bang Bang, Skeet Skeet Skeet" percussion rhythm in "It's House" went on to become a staple in the genres of "Ghetto House" and "Footwork".

Chip E. assisted Frankie Knuckles when he co-produced Frankie's first record You Can't Hide. Other artists Chip jump-started into the music world were Lidell Townsell, Kevin Irving, and Harri Dennis of The It. By the age of 21 Chip E. was a worldwide name. Because of difficulties getting out of a contract with DJ International Records, Chip decided that he would rather not record if he had to do it for D.J. International. His first release Jack Trax is one of the most coveted early house music releases, fetching upwards of $1500.00 (USD) on eBay.

== Going Underground ==
Around 1995 Chip E. stopped recording music but could be found doing the rare DJ gig in Britain or Italy; he had moved into "the realms of mythology." However, while Chip E. wasn't seen much in the music scene, he had resurfaced as a film and DVD guru. Besides work with artists such as Michael McDonald, Fleetwood Mac, Prince, The Dead, and The Black Eyed Peas, Chip E. also produced a feature-length documentary on the subject of house music. The documentary is entitled The UnUsual Suspects - Once Upon a Time in House Music. was released in the summer of 2005.

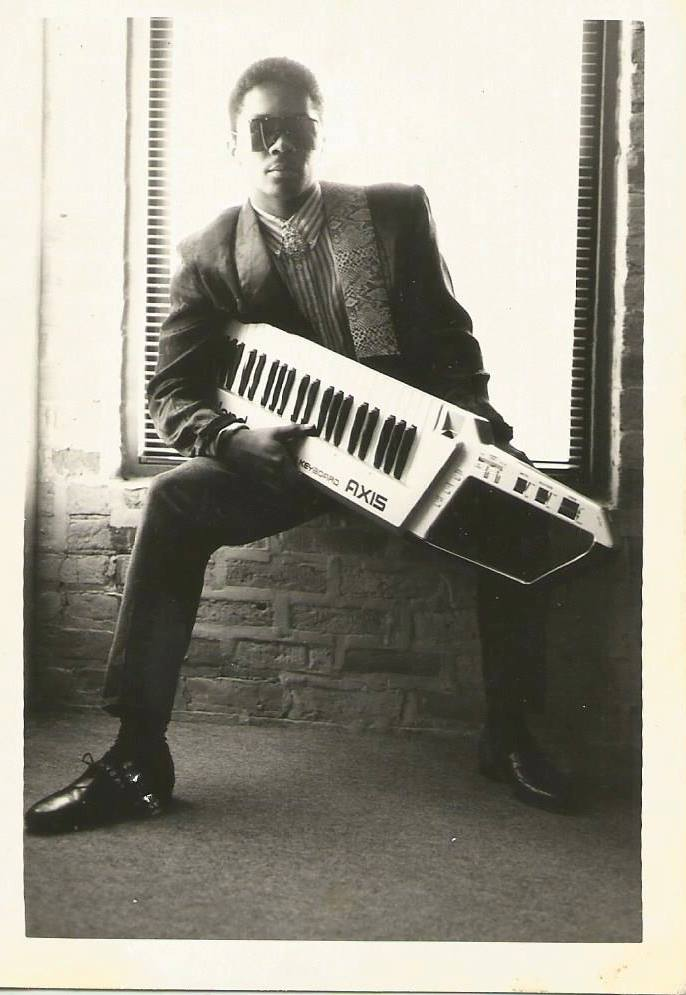
Chip E. with a Roland Axis Controller (c. 1986)

== Back to Jack ==
In 2017 Chip E. connected with Carl Cox and the two started working on new music. Carl mentioned in the film 2017 that Chip's record "Time to Jack" was the first House/Techno record. Since their connection, Chip has released "Like This" (a remake of his '80s classic) with the group SLAM on Soma Records, "Time 2 Jack" with Carl Cox on Intec Digital, and collaborations with Gettoblaster and Saladin on We Jack and Phunk Junk Records.

Chip E. DJ'd at the 20th Anniversary of the Ultra Music Festival, and the following night joined Carl Cox on stage to premier their collaboration "Time 2 Jack" in March 2018. Since then Chip has been playing festivals around the world including Thailand and Cuba.

== See also ==
- List of house music artists
