= Discotronic =

Austrian handsup/dancecore duo

Discotronic is an Austrian dance and hands-up project of two Vienna producers, Thomas Greisl and Steve Twain (Stephan Deutsch).

== History ==
The producer duo of Thomas Greisl and Steve Twain (Stephan Deutsch) founded the dance project Discotronic in 2006. The first single, "Tricky Disco", developed into a European club hit. In Germany, the single charted in the top 5 of the dance charts. Discotronic followed up with two more singles, "World of Discotronic / Now is the Time" and "The Master Plan."

Discotronic is under contract to the Hamburg record label, Mental Madness Records, which the German DJ and producer Dennis Bohn of Brooklyn Bounce founded and is among the most successful labels of the genre.

Discotronic remixes many successful artists in the dance scene. They have already remixed tracks for DJ Manian, Cascada, Brooklyn Bounce, Rob Mayth & Dan Winter, Yanou, Basshunter, and many others.

In 2024 their song "Tricky Disco" went viral on the social media app TikTok.

== Singles ==
- "I Surrender" (Mental Madness Records)
- "Shooting Star" (Mental Madness Records)
- "The Master Plan" (Mental Madness Records)
- "Tricky Disco" (Mental Madness Records)
- "Tricky Disco" (UK Edition) (All Around The World)
- "World of Discotronic / Now is the Time" (Mental Madness Records)

== Remixes ==
- Alex Megane - Hurricane 09 (Discotronic Remix) - Yawa Recordings
- Andrew Spencer - Video Killed The Radio Star (Discotronic Remix) - Mental Madness
- Basshunter - Please Don't Go (Discotronic Remix) - Warner / MoS UK / Balloon Records
- Brooklyn Bounce - Get Ready To Bounce (Discotronic Remix) - Mental Madness Records
- Dan Winter & Mayth - Dare Me (Discotronic Remix) - Zooland Records
- DJ Lawless - Sex Toys (Discotronic Remix) - Mental Madness Records
- DJ Manian - Welcome to the Club (Discotronic Remix) - Zooland Records
- DJ Roxx - Jumping & Pumping (Discotronic Remix) - Mental Madness Records
- Escape One - Upside Down (Discotronic Remix) - Balloon Records
- Global Players - Daydream (Discotronic Remix) - Klubbstyle Records
- Kevin Stomper - L.I.S.I (Discotronic Remix) - Klubbstyle Records
- Manian feat Aila - Heaven (Discotronic Remix) - Zeitgeist
- Manox - Supermodel Girlfriend (Discotronic Remix) - Zooland Records
- Rebecca J. - I Need You To Be Here (Discotronic Remix) - Be52
- Silverstation - Sunshine After The Rain (Discotronic Remix) - Klubbstyle Records
- Stee Wee Bee - A Star (Discotronic Remix) - Mental Madness Records
- The Boyscouts - Pussy Gain (Discotronic Remix) Trak Music
- Ultraflirt - Heaven Is A Place On Earth (Discotronic Remix) - Mental Madness Records
- Yanou feat Mark Daviz - A Girl Like You (Discotronic Remix) - Zooland Records
