= Shawn Christopher =

American singer

Shawn Christopher is an American house music singer from Chicago, Illinois.

== Career ==
She was a touring backing vocalist for R&B singer Chaka Khan from 1982 to 1985. She was also a member of the industrial dance band known as My Life with the Thrill Kill Kult and sang with the group Sonia Dada. She is the sister of the R&B singer, keyboardist, and producer Gavin Christopher.

She sang lead vocals on a song by DJ/producer Lil Louis titled "French Kiss" in 1989. The song became a #1 hit on the Billboard Hot Dance Club Play chart that year.

During the 1990s, she also scored three #1 singles on the Hot Dance Club Play chart in her own right: "Another Sleepless Night", in 1991 (which also reached #67 on the Billboard Hot 100 chart, and #50 on the UK Singles Chart); "Don't Lose the Magic", in 1992 (which peaked at #71 on the Hot 100, and UK chart #30); and "Sweet Freedom", in 1998. In addition, she sang backing vocals on Jimmy Somerville's #1 Hot Dance Club Play track from 1995, "Heartbeat".

She also recorded a song titled "Thinking About the Way" in the early 1990s and reached #57 in the UK in 1994 with "Make My Love".

== See also ==
- List of number-one dance hits (United States)
- List of artists who reached number one on the US Dance chart
