= Double You =

Italian Eurodance group

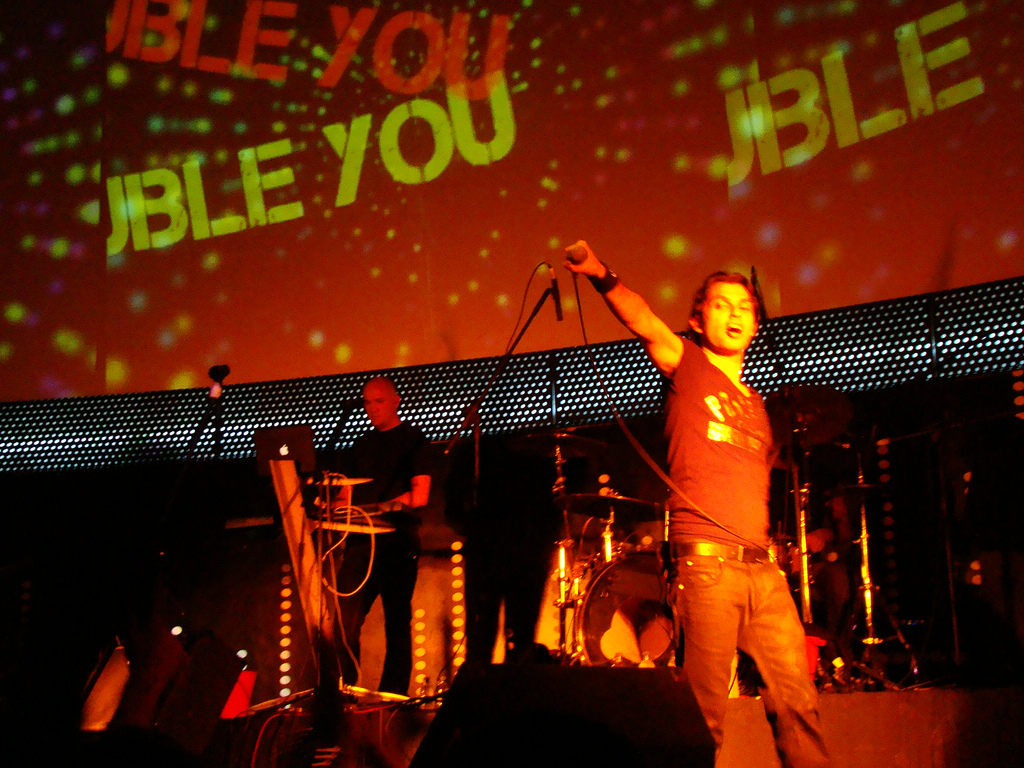
- Double You in Bauru, Brazil (June 2009)

Background information
- Origin: La Spezia, Italy
- Genres: Eurodance, Italo dance, house
- Years active: 1985–present
- Labels: Azul Music, BMG, DWA Records, Indie Records, Panic Records, Polygram, Som Livre, Sony Music Brasil, Spotlight Records, Universal Music Brasil, Warner Music Brasil, ZYX Music
- Members: William Naraine; Gino Martini; Gustavo Filipovich; Paulo Soveral; Missaka
- Past members: Andrea de Antoni, Franco Amato

Double You are an Italian Techno and Eurodance group founded in 1985 by vocalist William Naraine, keyboardist and producer Franco Amato and DJ Andrea de Antoni. By 1992, they had sold more than three million records. "Please Don't Go", a dance version of KC & the Sunshine Band's 1979 ballad, is one of their major hits.

Since 2013, they have been fronted by Naraine, Gino Martini, Gustavo Filipovich, Paulo Soveral and Missaka.

== History ==
=== 1990s ===
Double You formed in La Spezia. In 1991, they met with the producer Roberto Zanetti, who agreed on recording the band. In January 1992, "Please Don't Go", a dance version of the KC and the Sunshine Band song, was released, earning many gold and platinum records in Europe, Latin America, Africa and Asia. The record also sold in North America (top ten maxi sales), Israel (No. 12) and in the UK (No. 2 on the Cool Cuts Chart)

The second single, "We All Need Love" (cover of Canadian artist Domenic Troiano from 1979) was recorded in June 1992 during a European tour and charted around the world. After this second single, their debut album We All Need Love followed, which put together songs such as "Who's Fooling Who" (cover of a One Way song and the third single) and "Why (Let's Make It Christmas)". They performed the latter together with the original composer and singer of "Please Don't Go", Harry Casey, professionally known as "KC".

At the end of 1993, the recording of the second album, the Blue Album, started. These singles followed: "Missing You", "Part Time Lover", "Heart of Glass" and "Run to Me" (the song gave the group the possibility of starting their first tour in North America in 1995). They performed in such cities as Miami, Daytona, Orlando and other towns along the east coast.

The group performed in theatres and concert halls in Brazil, such as the Metropolitan in Rio de Janeiro and Olympia in São Paulo. In less than three months, the group performed 64 shows, attended by more than 350,000 people.

In 1995, a new single, "Dancing with an Angel" was released, featuring singer Sandra Chambers. A long Italian tour began, lasting eight months. The song was also a success in other countries such as Switzerland, Australia, Israel and Latin America. Another single, "Because I'm Loving You", was released in different versions. It was a big hit in Spain, Italy, Israel (where it reached No. 1) and Brazil and one of the most aired on European radios.

At the beginning of 1996, Andrea de Antoni left the group to undertake his own artistic career. In this period, Double You was in great demand in Brazil, so the new tour started. There they performed in the most important concert halls of the country. The group dedicated the album Forever to all their Brazilian fans. Half of this new album was produced in Italy and the rest in Brazil. It was released only in that country, selling 150,000 copies.

A single was released in the same year in Brazil only, under the label Spotlight, entitled "If You Say Goodbye".

William Naraine also took part in several DWA projects: Data Drama, Eclipse, Mission, Funkelectra, Infinity feat. Sense, Kaas, Pacific, Space Tribe, Time Machine, Toro, and Willy Morales. After a two-year rest and spending time in the studio to create new songs for their next album, in spring 1997, the new single "Somebody" was released. In 1999, another single was released, called "Desperado".

=== 2000s ===
In 2000, Double You released a track called "Music (Is the Answer)" followed by a 2001 remix of the hit "Please Don't Go". A best of album called Studio Live was released the same year in Brazil. In 2002, Double You released a single entitled "Dance Anymore". He had worked with Memi P. and Ryo S., and produced and performed with other bands such as T-Factory. The same year, his voice was featured by Love Solution for the track "I'll Be over You".

In 2003, Double You did a remake of the Bryan Adams hit "(Everything I Do) I Do It for You", and a cover of U2's "With or Without You" (which was not released as a single). The band toured in all the main Brazilian cities. In May, they did shows in the South and Southeast, including both a presentation at the Olympia of São Paulo and their playing at the Caipiriba Dance, in the city of Aparecida. Then they went to Belém, Macapá and Manaus.

In March 2004, William Naraine contributed to Vanni G's single "All My Illusion". In October, he appeared once again on the next single "I Say Yeah". He also took part on a remix of the single by Promise Land vs Netzwerk Memories, where he made a duet with Sandy. In 2005, Double You released with artist Don Cartel "Please Don't Go 2005" on Triple B Records. The single hit the Dutch Mega Top 100 chart at No. 40 and the Pepsi Chart at No. 38. In November 2007, a live DVD (shot during a concert in São Paulo) and a live CD were released, available in Brazil only.

== Discography ==
=== Studio albums ===
Title	Details	Peak chart positions		
Title	Details	AUT	GER	SWI
We All Need Love	Release date: November 30, 1992; Label: DWA; Formats: CD	24	58	12
The Blue Album	Release date: 1994; Label: DWA (Dance World Attack); Formats: CD	—	—	—
Forever	Release date: 1996; Label: DWA; Formats: CD	—	—	—
Heaven	Release date: 1998; Label: DWA; Formats: CD	—	—	—
Life	Release date: 2011; Label: Som Livre; Formats: CD	—	—	—
"—" denotes releases that did not chart

=== Compilations ===
Title	Details
Why (Let's Make It Christmas)/Megamix/Megahits	Release date: 1993; Label: ZYX Music; Formats: CD
The Best Of	Release date: 1996; Label: Spotlight Records; Formats: CD
Pérolas	Release date: 2000; Label: Som Livre; Formats: CD
The Very Best of Double You	Release date: 2006; Label: Indie Records; Formats: CD

=== Remix albums ===
Title	Details
Double Mix	Release date: 1992; Label: DWA (Dance World Attack); Formats: CD
Megamix	Release date: 1992; Label: Panic Records; Formats: CD
The Remixes	Release date: 1993; Label: Spotlight Records; Formats: CD
The 12" Remixes	Release date: 1995; Label: ZYX Music; Formats: CD

=== Live albums ===
Title	Details	Peak chart positions		
Title	Details	AUT	GER	SWI
Studio Live	Release date: 2001; Label: Spotlight Records/Som Livre; Formats: CD	—	—	—
Live In Brazil	Release date: 2008; Label: Azul Music; Formats: CD	—	—	—
"—" denotes releases that did not chart

=== Singles ===
Year	Title	Peak chart positions										Album
Year	Title	ITA	AUT	BEL (Vl)	FRA	GER	NED	SWE	SUI	UK	EUR	Album
1992	"Please Don't Go"	6	2	1	2	3	1	9	2	41	3	We All Need Love
1992	"We All Need Love"	8	8	2	10	5	12	33	7	—	15	We All Need Love
1992	"Who's Fooling Who"	—	—	18	26	40	—	—	—	—	53	We All Need Love
1993	"With or Without You"	—	—	35	—	—	—	—	—	—	—	We All Need Love
1993	"Missing You"	23	—	—	—	—	—	—	—	—	—	The Blue Album
1993	"Part-Time Lover"	—	—	—	—	—	—	—	—	—	—	The Blue Album
1994	"Heart of Glass"	21	—	—	—	—	—	—	—	—	39	The Blue Album
1994	"Run to Me"	—	—	49	—	—	18	—	—	—	—	The Blue Album
1995	"Dancing with an Angel"	2	—	—	—	—	—	—	—	—	23	Forever
1996	"Because I'm Loving You"	8	37	—	—	—	—	—	—	—	17	Forever
1996	"Send Away the Rain" (Brazil only)	—	—	—	—	—	—	—	—	—	—	Forever
1996	"If You Say Goodbye" (Brazil only)	—	—	—	—	—	—	—	—	—	—	Forever
1996	"Gimme All Your Love" (Brazil only)	—	—	—	—	—	—	—	—	—	—	Forever
1997	"Somebody"	13	—	—	—	—	—	—	—	—	—	Single only
1999	"Do You Wanna Be Funky"	—	—	—	—	—	—	—	—	—	—	Heaven
1999	"Ain't No Stopping Us Now"	—	—	—	—	—	—	—	—	—	—	Heaven
1999	"Desperado"		—	—	—	—	—	—	—	—	—	Heaven
2000	"Music (Is the Answer)"	—	—	—	—	—	—	—	—	—	—	Singles only
2001	"Please Don't Go 2001"	—	—	—	—	—	—	—	—	—	—	Singles only
2002	"Eazy 2 Luv"	—	—	—	—	—	—	—	—	—	—	Singles only
2002	"Dance Anymore"	—	—	—	—	—	—	—	—	—	—	Singles only
2002	"Please Don't Go 2002"	—	—	—	—	—	—	—	—	—	—	Singles only
2003	"(Everything I Do) I Do It for You"	—	—	—	—	—	—	—	—	—	—	Singles only
2005	"You Are Everything"	—	—	—	—	—	—	—	—	—	—	Singles only
2005	"Please Don't Go 2005"	—	—	—	—	—	48	—	—	—	—	Singles only
2006	"(Everything I Do) I Do It for You" (NED only)	—	—	—	—	—	66	—	—	—	—	Singles only
2008	"You, My Love" (Brazil only)	—	—	—	—	—	—	—	—	—	—	Singles only
2010	"If I Could Fall"	—	—	—	—	—	—	—	—	—	—	Life
"—" denotes releases that did not chart

== Promotional singles ==
Year	Title	Album
1996	"Gonna Be My Baby"	Forever
1999	"You and I"	Heaven

== Collaborations ==
Year	Title	Artist	Album
1994	"Rebel Rebel"	Double You feat. Ice MC	Single only
1995	"Me and You"	Alexia feat. Double You	Single only
2001	"Message In a Bottle"	T-Factory feat. Double You	Single only
2002	"I'll Be Over You"	Love Solution feat. William Naraine	Single only
2002	"What Is Love"	Brubaker feat. Double You	Single only
2004	"All My Illusions"	Vanni G feat. William Naraine	Single only
2004	"I Say Yeah"	Vanni G feat. William Naraine	Single only
2005	"Please Don't Go 2005"	Double You feat. Don Cartel	Single only
2005	"Get Up"	DJ Ross vs. Double You	Single only
2005	"Beat Goes On"	DJ Ross vs. Double You	Single only
2006	"Everything I Do"	Double You feat. Don Cartel	Single only
2006	"The Volume"	GM feat. Double You	Single only
2006	"What Can I Do"	GM feat. Double You	Single only
2007	"Planet Electro"	CN vs. Double You	Single only
2007	"To the Beat"	DJ Ross vs. Double You	Single only
2008	"Change"	DJ Ross vs. Double You	Single only
2008	"Lose Control"	GM feat. Double You	Single only
2009	"Please Don't Go 2009"	DJ Ross vs. Double You	Single only

== See also ==
- List of Eurodance artists
