= Altern-8 =

British rave music duo

Altern 8
- Also known as: C&M Connection; Nexus 21; Soul Brothers Inc.
- Origin: Stafford, Staffordshire, England
- Genres: Electronic; Detroit techno; acid house; breakbeat hardcore
- Years active: 1990–1993; 2004–present
- Label: Network
- Members: Mark Archer
- Past members: Chris Peat

Altern 8 is a British electronic music act, comprising Mark Archer and Chris Peat, until Peat left the group in 1994. Best known in the early 1990s, their trademark was electronic rave music with a heavy bass line. Notable Altern 8 tracks included "Activ 8", "E-Vapor-8", "Frequency", "Brutal-8-E", "Armageddon", "Move My Body", "Hypnotic St8" and "Infiltrate 202".

On stage and in music videos, (such as the music video for "E-Vapor-8"), Altern 8's members wore their signature fluorescent yellow dust masks and green MK3 chemical warfare suits. The band signed with Network Records based in Stratford House, Birmingham, England.

== History ==
=== Nexus 21 ===
Formed in 1989, by Mark Archer and Chris Peat, Nexus 21 was a British techno duo from Stafford, England. The group was signed to the Blue Chip record label, owned by former Wigan Casino DJ Kev Roberts, under which they released "(Still) Life Keeps Moving": a vocal techno tune, and The Rhythm Of Life, an album influenced by Detroit techno with acid house, electro and breakbeats elements.

A second album was set for release in late 1991, but due to sample clearance problems, the LP never materialised. A small edition of white labels of "I Know We Can Make It" / "Sychologic PSP" was released, which showcased a bigger hardcore influence.

When the Blue Chip label folded, the duo moved to Network Records, releasing Another Night, and The Detroit remixes.

After the release of Overload (EP), as Altern 8, the pair released the following tracks as Nexus 21: "Self Hypnosis": a deep techno contribution to the Bio Rhythm compilation, a remix of which appeared on the Progressive Logic EP, alongside "Together" (from Bio Rhythm 2) and two tunes from The Rhythm Of Life, one remixed.

=== The beginning of Altern 8 ===
Altern 8 was formed in Stafford in 1990, as a side project to Nexus 21 (a name chosen because of its "futuristic house sound"), when both members were aged 21. From the outset, the band's objective was to develop their style which was influenced by the musical elements of Detroit techno artists Derrick May, Juan Atkins and Kevin Saunderson, as well as the Chicago house music sound of Phuture and early electronic pioneers such as Kraftwerk. Although in the inlay of their first album they credit Manchester-based British acid house group 808 State, by thanking them for starting the UK rave scene.

Altern 8 tunes influenced many artists, with their mixture of the sounds of the Roland TB-303, 808 and 909 with break-beats and familiar samples. At the time in the UK, outdoor rave events were legal, and Altern 8 had a reputation for turning up to play at major unofficial events. They helped to define harder house tracks relying more heavily on bass and volume. The use of more bass and eclectic noises gradually evolved Altern 8's music away from the earlier house music style. The duo, dressed in chemical warfare suits and dancing "like electrofied monkeys", took part in a large number of live performances.

In 1991, Altern 8 released their first single, "Infiltrate 202". The same year, the band did a live performance in the car park outside Shelley's night club in Longton, Stoke-on-Trent, which can be seen in the video for their second single, "Activ 8 (Come With Me)".

=== Full On...Mask Hysteria ===
The band released an album on the Network Records label in 1992, called Full On... Mask Hysteria, which featured six of their first seven singles. The same year, Peat stood as a candidate for the Stafford constituency in the General Election representing the 'Hardcore (Altern8-ive)' party. He received 158 votes and finished in fourth place.

In 1993, Archer began producing music. Billed as Slo Moshun, Archer was responsible for the hits "Bells of NY" and "Help My Friend".

In 1994, Peat and Archer parted ways. Archer continued to DJ under the name Altern 8 until Peat declined permission to use the Altern 8 name and trademarks.

=== Comeback - Mark Archer as Altern 8 ===
The 2001 DJ mix album Old Skool Euphoria, part of the Euphoria series of albums, was mixed by Archer using the Altern 8 pseudonym. The album is a double album of various "old skool" acid house and rave music produced in the late 1980s and early 1990s. The album includes two Altern 8 songs.

Mark Archer carried on as Altern 8 with the original MCs and dancers from 1999 and performed at Old School Hardcore reunion events throughout the 2000s. Since 2014, Altern 8 have enjoyed a new resurgence in popularity through a series of live appearances at festivals and clubs across the UK, introducing them to a new generation of fans.

In 2013, a campaign was launched on Facebook and Twitter to get Altern 8's 1991 song "Activ 8 (Come With Me)" to number 1 in the chart for Christmas. The song ultimately ended up hitting number 33.

In 2020, Altern 8 headlined the Bang Face festival at Pontins in Southport, which was the last large-scale music event held in the UK before the government advised against gatherings of this kind during the coronavirus pandemic. In November, the first 'new' Altern 8 track since 1993 was released. Called "Hard Crew", the hardcore tune had been heard in Altern 8 sets over the past few years, but 2020 marked the first time it had been widely available (with the release coming in a number of remixes in support of the #WeAreViable campaign).

== Quotation ==
From Andrew Harrison of Select magazine as printed in the Infiltr-8 America EP:

Is it possible to take Altern-8 seriously? It's impossible not to. Because behind the rave pantomime and the giant robots and the mask hysteria, this is music for a different generation. These people never wasted their lives waiting for the next punk to arrive. 1988 was their Year Zero. And it's still here. All you have to do is close your eyes.

This is about people with Kraftwerk and Pierre, Transmat and WARP, 808, 909 and 303 encoded in their DNA. This is a live transmission of the beat you can't defeat, sampled over and over and hideously mutated. If you don't understand it, you don't deserve to. This is the phuture, right now, and THIS is the sound of Altern-8.

== Discography ==
=== Studio albums ===
Title	Album details	Peak chart positions
Title	Album details	UK
Full On... Mask Hysteria	Released: 13 July 1992; Label: Network Records; Format: Digital download, CD	11

=== DJ mix albums ===
- Old Skool Euphoria (2001) (Telstar Records/BMG)

=== Extended plays ===
Title	EP details
Overload EP	Released: 1 October 1990; Label: Network Records; Format: 12" vinyl; UK No. 99
The Vertigo EP	Released: 1991; Label: ZYX Records; Format: 12" vinyl
Infiltr-8 America EP	Released: 1992; Label: Virgin Records America; Format: 12" vinyl

=== Singles ===
Year	Title	Peak chart positions					Album
Year	Title	UK	UK Dance	AUS	SCO	IRE	Album
1991	"Infiltrate 202"	28	—	—	—	—	Full On... Mask Hysteria
1991	"Activ 8 (Come with Me)"	3	—	—	—	—	Full On... Mask Hysteria
1991	"Frequency"	41	—	—	—	—	Full On... Mask Hysteria
1992	"Evapor 8" (Guest vocal P. P. Arnold)	6	—	124	—	9	Full On... Mask Hysteria
1992	"Hypnotic St-8"	16	—	—	—	20	Full On... Mask Hysteria
1992	"Shame" (Altern-8 vs Evelyn King)	74	—	—	—	—	Non-album single
1992	"Brutal-8-E"	43	—	—	—	—	Full On... Mask Hysteria
1993	"Everybody"	58	—	—	—	—	Non-album single
2013	"Activ 8 (Come with Me)" (2013 Remixes)	33	7	—	40	—	Non-album single
"—" denotes single that did not chart or was not released.
