= Another Sleepless Night (Shawn Christopher song) =

Single by Shawn Christopher

from the album Another Sleepless Night
- Released: November 1990
- Recorded: 1990
- Genre: House; dance-pop
- Label: Arista
- Songwriters: Mike "Hitman" Wilson; Tracey Amos
- Producer: Mike "Hitman" Wilson

Shawn Christopher singles chronology
| "Another Sleepless Night" (1990) | "Don't Lose the Magic" (1992) |

Music video
- "Another Sleepless Night" on YouTube

Alternative cover
- US retail cassette edition; the US CD edition was released for only promotional use

"Another Sleepless Night" is a song written and produced by Mike "Hitman" Wilson, and recorded by American dance music singer Shawn Christopher. The single, released in November 1990 by Arista Records as the lead off track from the album of the same name (1992), was the first of two number ones on the US Billboard Hot Dance Club Play chart for the Chicago-born artist, reaching the top spot in February 1991. It also charted at number 67 on the Billboard Hot 100. In the UK, the song was released in 1991, and again in 1999, peaking at number 50 on the UK Singles Chart and number eight on the Music Week Dance Singles chart.

== Background ==
When it was first released in 1990, the single was credited to Wilson, with Christopher being the featured singer, as the song was recorded for a dance music compilation for Arista Records. The feedback from the song resulted in Arista releasing the single with Christopher receiving major billing after it caught the attention of Arista founder Clive Davis, who immediately signed Christopher to a record deal.

== Critical reception ==
Larry Flick from Billboard magazine wrote, "Legendary Chicago house music DJ tries his hand at pumping his own beats, and succeeds greatly with this body-invading jam. Diva vocals from Christopher and disco-styled strings provide a Black Box-like appeal. Will keep you up spinning all night long." Marisa Fox from Entertainment Weekly described it as an "energetic, fast-paced" track with "light, catchy" chorus. She added that "gone are the days when house music meant stone-cold rhythms and hardly any melody." James Hamilton from Record Mirror stated that "this multi-tracked soulful girl wailed and rapped terrific chunkily pounding attractive breezy bounder should hook you on first hearing".

== Track listing ==
- Retail cassette (US)
1. "Another Sleepless Night" (Original Mix)
2. "Another Sleepless Night" (Jazzy Dub)
- Promo CD (US)
1. "Another Sleepless Night" (Single Version) – 3:58
2. "Another Sleepless Night" (Club Edit) – 3:50
3. "Another Sleepless Night" (Classic Mix) – 7:06

== Charts ==
1990/1991 release

| Chart (1990–91) | Peak position |
|---|---|
| Australia (ARIA) | 170 |
| UK Singles (OCC) | 50 |
| UK Dance (Music Week) | 8 |
| UK Club Chart (Record Mirror) | 30 |
| US Billboard Hot 100 | 67 |
| US Hot Dance Club Play (Billboard) | 1 |

1999 re-release

| Chart (1999) | Peak position |
|---|---|
| UK Singles (OCC) | 84 |
