= KWS (band) =

British dance act from Nottingham

- Origin: Nottingham, England
- Genres: Pop; electronic; rave; house
- Years active: 1991–1994
- Label: Network
- Past members: Chris King; Winston "Winnie" Williams; Delroy St. Joseph

KWS was a British dance act from Nottingham, England consisting of instrumentalists/record producers Chris King and Winston "Winnie" Williams, and vocalist Delroy St. Joseph. The band's name is an initialism of the members' surnames, King/Williams/St. Joseph.

== Chart history ==
They had a number one single on the UK Singles Chart with the double A-side "Please Don't Go" / "Game Boy".

Keyboard player Chris King appeared on Never Mind the Buzzcocks in the Identity Parade round. At the time he was working as a classic scooter renovator.

== Deaths ==
Chris King died on 22 March 2023, at the age of 66.

Winston Williams died on 2 January 2024 at age of 66.

== Members ==
- Delroy St. Joseph – vocals
- Winston "Winnie" Williams – keyboards, backing vocals (died 2024)
- Chris King – keyboards, backing vocals (died 2023)

== Discography ==
=== Studio albums ===
Title	Album details	Peak chart positions		
Title	Album details	AUS	CAN	US
KWS/Please Don't Go	Released: September 1992; Label: Network	148	56	143

=== Singles ===
Year	Title	Peak chart positions										Certifications	Album
Year	Title	UK	AUS	CAN	FIN	GER	IRE	NZ	SWE	SWI	US	Certifications	Album
1992	"Please Don't Go"	1	2	27	2	7	3	9	8	11	6	UK: Gold; AUS: Platinum; CAN: Gold; US: Gold	KWS/Please Don't Go
1992	"Rock Your Baby"	8	38	—	—	—	6	32	—	—	—		KWS/Please Don't Go
1992	"Hold Back the Night" (featuring The Trammps)	30	118	—	—	—	20	—	—	—	—		KWS/Please Don't Go
1993	"Can't Get Enough of Your Love"	49	—	—	—	—	—	—	—	—	—		Non-album singles
1993	"Give Me Love (This Christmas Time)"	—	—	—	—	—	—	—	—	—	—		Non-album singles
1994	"It Seems to Hang On"	58	—	—	—	—	—	—	—	—	—		Non-album singles
1994	"Ain't Nobody (Loves Me Better)" (with Gwen Dickey)	21	43	—	—	—	—	—	—	—	—		Non-album singles
1994	"The More I Get the More I Want" (featuring Teddy Pendergrass)	35	—	—	—	—	—	—	—	—	—		Non-album singles
1997	"Gimme Little Sign"	—	—	—	—	—	—	—	—	—	—		Non-album singles
"—" denotes items that did not chart or were not released in that territory.
