= Don't Lose the Magic =

Single by Shawn Christopher

from the album Another Sleepless Night
- Released: 1992
- Recorded: 1991
- Genre: House; dance-pop
- Length: 3:55
- Label: Arista Records
- Songwriters: Mike "Hitman" Wilson; Gavin Christopher; Bill Dickens
- Producers: Mike "Hitman" Wilson; Goh Hotoda; Neal Howard; Chris Cooke; George Hess

Shawn Christopher singles chronology
"Another Sleepless Night" (1990)	"Don't Lose the Magic" (1992)	"Make My Love" (1994)

Music video
- "Don't Lose the Magic" on YouTube

"Don't Lose the Magic" is a song recorded by American singer Shawn Christopher, which was co-written by Mike "Hitman" Wilson, Shawn's brother Gavin Christopher and Bill Dickens, and co-produced by Wilson with Neal Howard, Chris Cooke, George Hess and engineer Goh Hotoda. The single was the follow-up to "Another Sleepless Night", as well as her second number-one single on the US Billboard Hot Dance Club Play chart, reaching the top spot on March 28, 1992, for two weeks. On the Billboard Hot 100 chart, it peaked at number 71, while in the United Kingdom, it reached number 30 on the UK Singles Chart, her highest chart position there. A 1999 remix of the song also hit the US Dance chart.

== Critical reception ==
Larry Flick from Billboard magazine commented, "The track, which has been remixed by Mike "Hitman" Wilson, David Morales, and Todd Terry, is a slammin', R&B flavored houser that frames Christopher's fine voice with spiraling strings and a warm bass line. Guaranteed to pack dancefloors". He also added that "the beats pump hard, the hook is undeniable, and Christopher proves that she is far from a one-hit wonder." A reviewer from Music & Media wrote, "The '70s disco magic is revived."

== Track listings ==
- 12 inch single (US)

A1: "Don't Lose the Magic" (Hitman's 12") - 7:13
A2: "Don't Lose the Magic" (Dee Reprise) - 3:30
B1: "Don't Lose the Magic" (Morales' 12") - 7:52
B2: "Don't Lose the Magic" (Magic Todd Dub) - 5:45

- CD promo (US)
1. "Don't Lose the Magic" (Hitman's 7") - 4:01
2. "Don't Lose the Magic" (Hitmans 12") - 7:13

== Charts ==
=== Weekly charts ===
Original version

Chart (1992)	Peak position
Australia (ARIA)	124
Belgium (Ultratop Flanders)	30
Europe (European Dance Radio)	6
Netherlands (Dutch Top 40)	22
Netherlands (Single Top 100)	27
UK Singles (OCC)	30
UK Airplay (Music Week)	16
UK Dance (Music Week)	4
UK Club Chart (Music Week)	1
US Billboard Hot 100	71
US Hot Dance Club Play (Billboard)	1

1999 remix

Chart (1999)	Peak position
US Hot Dance Music-Club Play (Billboard)	4

=== Year-end charts ===
Chart (1992)	Position
UK Club Chart (Music Week)	5
