= Bad Boy Bill =

American DJ

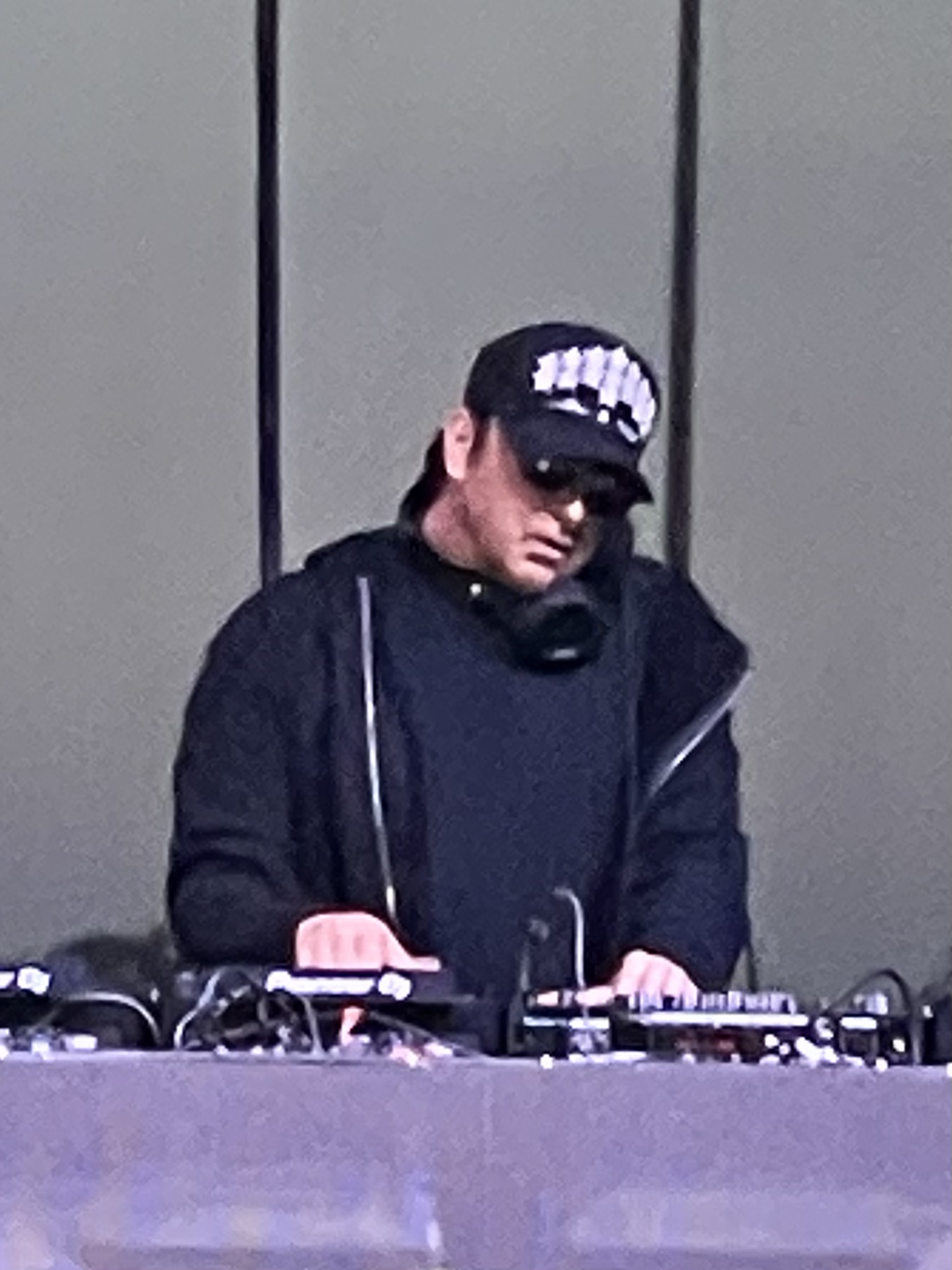
- Bad Boy Bill on June 14, 2025 in Aurora, Illinois

Background information
- Also known as: Bad Boy Bill, 3B
- Born: William Renkosik
- Origin: Chicago, Illinois, U.S.
- Genres: Acid house, electro, electronic, freestyle, hard house, hip hop, hip house, house, techno, turntablism
- Occupation: DJ
- Years active: 1985–present
- Labels: D.J. International Records, International House Records, Mix Connection Multimedia, Menage Music, Thrive, Nettwerk
- Website: badboybill.com

William Renkosik, known by his stage name Bad Boy Bill, is an American disc jockey (DJ) from Chicago, Illinois, who plays house music.

While only in his teens, Bad Boy Bill began his DJ career in 1985 during the Chicago house music movement of the mid to late 1980s.

He worked with Mike "Hitman" Wilson and Julian "Jumpin" Perez of the WBMX DJ mixing team, known then as the Hot Mix 5. Bill's popularity grew out of DJing parties throughout the Chicago metropolitan area, as well as opening for the Hot Mix 5. Bad Boy Bill was a regular DJ on the popular house mixes on WBMX 102.7 FM in Chicago, WGCI 107.5 FM and then on the B96 96.3 FM a top pop station.

As a remixer, he landed his first Top Five Billboard Dance Chart hit at the age of 19 – Dada Nada's "Deep Love" which also featured remixes by House music legends Frankie Knuckles & David Morales, Robert Ozn and Steve Wight.

Currently, Bad Boy Bill plays music ranging from House to Electro, and is known for playing six separate turntables at once. In 1988 and 1989, he was placed within the top three at the Disco Mix Club championships.

Bad Boy Bill also made an uncredited appearance as the club DJ in the opening scene of the 1998 film Blade.

== History ==
=== Street DJ Promotions era (1987–1995) ===
Between 1987 and 1995, Bill produced a series of promotional mixtapes under the name "Street DJ Promotions." These tapes were distributed out of Bill's car to local Chicago area record shops, flea markets, and DJ gigs. These mixes included: Hot Mix #1–17, Non-Stop Hip-Hop, Flashbacks Vol. 1 & 2, Classics Vol. 1–3, Street Style 1 & 2, and Gettin' Wicked.

Bill has been credited with the idea of mass-producing mix tapes unlike before, and was apparently inspired by Andre Lopez, owner of the Hot Jams record store. This caught the attention of the Recording Industry Association of America and music publishing houses who were not paid any royalties from the use of copyrighted music on the vast number of mixtapes being produced and sold throughout Chicago by these many DJs. Bill then became a part of the licensed-mix movement and started Mix Connection Multimedia (MCM). He has been generally credited with being the first Chicago DJ to produce legally licensed mixes.

=== Mix Connection Multimedia era (1995–2001) ===
Bill created MCM in 1995 to produce legally licensed mixes, and as an umbrella company for several side projects and record labels such as International House Records (IHR), Moody Recordings, Contaminated Muzik, Canvas Recordings, and Motus Music. MCM has most notably produced Bangin' The Box Vol. 1–5, The House Connection (w/ Richard "Humpty" Vission) Vol. 1–3, and The B-96 Mixmaster Throwdown Vol. 1–5.

=== House Connection (1997–1998) ===
Bad Boy Bill teamed up with Richard Vission to form a house DJ supergroup called The House Connection. They have released three mix albums, the last in 2013. In May 2006, Bill reunited with Vission in Dallas and Detroit for a two-day reunion show.

=== Behind The Decks (2003–2006) ===
In 2003, Bill released a CD/DVD mixtape titled Behind the Decks.

In May 2006, to support the Behind the Decks mixtape, Bill embarked on a three-day tour called "BTD Live". Bill performed in clubs like The Church in Denver and The Avalon in Los Angeles. Audio and video were recorded at all three shows and released as the BTD Live concert film in October 2006.

On August 5, 2013, The Official Bad Boy Bill YouTube page released House Connection 3, a free mixtape available to download on Richard Vission's SoundCloud page.

== Awards ==
- 2008 Ranked 80th best DJ in the world according to DJ Mag
- 2006 Ranked 1st as America's Favorite House DJ by BPM Magazine
- 2005 Best Dance DJ by URB Magazine MASSV Contributors' Poll
- 2003 Ranked 1st as America's Favorite House DJ according to BPM Magazine
- 2002 Ranked 4th as America's Favorite House DJ according to BPM Magazine
- 2001 Ranked 40th best DJ in the world according to DJ Magazine
- 2000 Ranked 84th best DJ in the world according to DJ Magazine
- 1999 URB Magazine Readers Poll 2nd Place DJ of the Year
- 1998 Winter Music Conference Mixshow DJ of the Year
- 1989 DMC US Finals (3rd Place)
- 1988 DMC US Finals (2nd Place)
- 1988 DMC Midwest Finals (1st Place)
- 1987 Hot 105 (Miami) Battle of the DJ's (1st Place)

== Discography ==
=== Albums ===
- July 28, 2009 – The Album

=== Continuous DJ Mixes ===
- August 2013 – House Connection Vol. 3 (with Richard Vission)
- October 17, 2006 – Behind The Decks Live CD/DVD
- September 2003 – Behind the Decks CD/DVD
- September 2001 – Bangin' The Box Vol. 5
- May 2000 – Bangin' in London
- August 1999 – Bangin' The Box Vol. 4
- October 1998 – House Connection Vol. 2 (with Richard Vission)
- September 1998 – Mixmaster Throwdown Vol. 3 (with B96 WBBM-FM DJs)
- April 1998 – Bangin' The Box Vol. 3
- October 1997 – Global House Culture Vol. 4
- July 1997 – Mixmaster Throwdown Vol. 2 (with B96 WBBM-FM DJs)
- May 1997 – The House Connection (with Richard Vission)
- October 1996 – Bangin' The Box Vol. 2
- June 1996 – Mixmaster Throwdown Vol. 1 (with B96 WBBM-FM DJs)
- October 1995 – Bangin' The Box Vol. 1
- 1994 – Gettin' Wicked Vol. 1
- 1994 – Street Style 1 & 2
- 1993 – Non-Stop Hip-Hop
- 1988–1994 Hot Mix series 1–17

=== Singles ===
- 2017 "Bang Them Walls" with Gettoblaster featuring Benjamin Paper
- 2017 "Do What You're Told" with Matthew Anthony
- 2017 "Pimpin Hoes" with Gettoblaster featuring DJ Dagwood
- 2017 "Balls & Lick" with Gettoblaster
- 2017 "Hustling For Horns" with Gettoblaster
- 2016 "Do Your Thing" with J Paul Getto and Milty Evans
- 2016 "White Girl" featuring Benjamin Paper
- 2015 "Shawty Want That Cake" with Gettoblaster
- 2010 "Fast Life" featuring Alex Peace
- 2009 "Do What You Like" featuring Alyssa Palmer
- 2009 "Falling Anthem" featuring Alyssa Palmer
- 2003 "Illicit Activities" EP with Hatiras
- 2003 "Happy" featuring Kevin Irving
- 2002 "Costa Del Sol" featuring Nadine Renee
- 2001 "Everybody" featuring Alex Peace
- 1988 "The First Revelation" EP
- 1988 "How Do Ya Feel"
- 1987 "Are You The One?"
- 1987 "Jack It All Night Long"

=== Remixes ===
- 2007 Shock Stars – End Of Chicago – Bad Boy Bill Remix
- 2007 Nelly Furtado – Say It Right – Menage Music Remix / Menage Acid Mix
- 2006 Steve Smooth & JJ Flores – Time For Love – Bad Boy Bill Remix
- 2005 Nine Inch Nails – The Hand That Feeds – Smooth & J & Bad Boy Bill Remix
- 2003 Harrison Crump – The Talk 2 – Bad Boy Bill Remix
- 1991 Dada Nada – "Give It All I Got" House Remix – (two-sided release w/"Good Thing) # 3 Cool Cuts Record Mirror U.K. Chart, # 25 Record Mirror Commercial Dance Chart
- 1990 Dada Nada – "Deep Love" – Hip House Remix – Top 5 Billboard Club

== Mix Details ==
=== Behind The Decks Live ===
- 20 Tracks Selectable
- 29 Tracks Mixed
- 1 hour 12 minutes

=== Behind The Decks ===
- 36 Tracks Selectable
