= Network Records =

UK record label

Network Records (formed out of Kool Kat Records) was an independent record label founded in Birmingham, England, in 1988 by Neil Rushton and Dave Barker.

It was instrumental in first introducing Detroit techno to a British audience, through its early Bio Rhythm compilations, as well as house music and developing homegrown breakbeat hardcore. Network released music from artists such as Juan Atkins, Derrick May, MK, Neal Howard, Model 500, Kevin Saunderson, Rhythm on the Loose, Cyclone, Funky Green Dogs From Outer Space, SL2, Nexus 21, Altern-8 & MC Lethal.

It launched a spin-off label, Six6 (also known as 6x6), distributed by Virgin Records from 1993 to 1996.

After a hiatus, Network returned to re-release the 1991 Derrick May album Innovator in December 2019.
