= Betty Wright =

American singer (1953–2020)

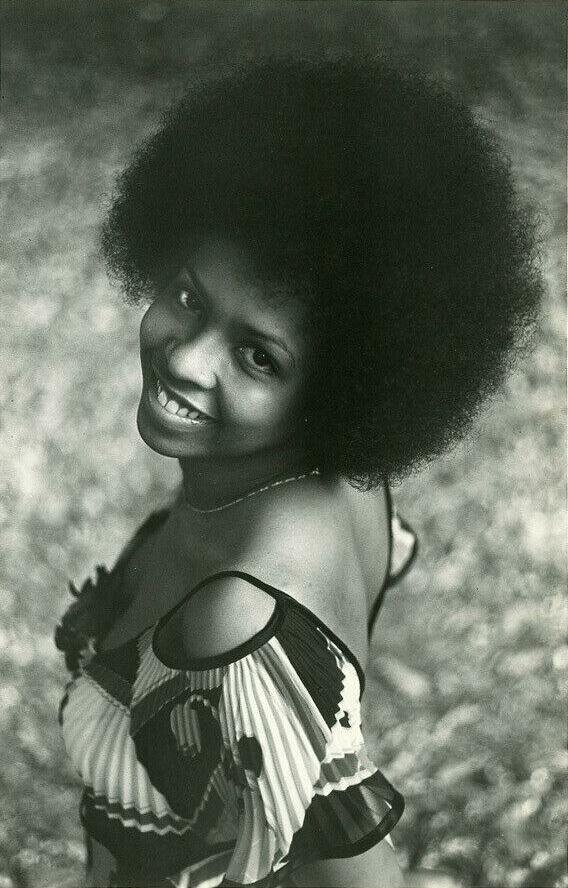
- Wright in 1976

Background information
- Born: Bessie Regina Norris; December 21, 1953; Miami, Florida, U.S.
- Died: May 10, 2020 (aged 66) Miami, Florida, U.S.
- Genres: R&B; soul; funk; gospel; disco; hip hop; new jack swing
- Occupations: Singer; songwriter
- Instruments: Vocals
- Years active: 1956–2020
- Labels: Atco; Alston; TK; Epic; Ms. B
- Formerly of: The Echoes of Joy

Bessie Regina Norris (December 21, 1953 – May 10, 2020), better known by her stage name Betty Wright, was an American soul and R&B singer, songwriter and background vocalist. Beginning her professional career in the late 1960s as a teenager, Wright rose to fame in the 1970s with hits such as "Clean Up Woman" and "Tonight Is the Night". Wright was also prominent in her use of whistle register.

== Biography ==
=== Early life and career ===
Born in Miami, Florida, as Bessie Regina Norris on December 21, 1953, Wright was the youngest of seven children of Rosa Akins Braddy-Wright and her second husband, McArthur Norris. Wright began her professional career at the age of two when her siblings formed the Echoes of Joy, a gospel group. Wright contributed to vocals on the group's first album, released in 1956. Wright and her siblings performed together until 1965, when she was 11 years old.

Following the group's break-up, Wright, who was already using the name Betty Wright, decided to switch musical styles from gospel to rhythm and blues, singing in local talent shows until she was spotted by a Miami record label owner, who signed her to her first label (Deep City Records) in 1966, when she was 12. She released the singles "Thank You Baby" and "Paralyzed", which found Wright local fame in Miami. In 1967, the teen was responsible for discovering other local talents such as George and Gwen McCrae, helping them sign with the Alston Records label TK Records, part of Henry Stone's recording and distribution company. Her first album, My First Time Around, was released when she was age 14. Her first hit single was "Girls Can't Do What the Guys Do". In 1970, while still in high school, she released "Pure Love" at the age of 16.

=== Breakthrough ===
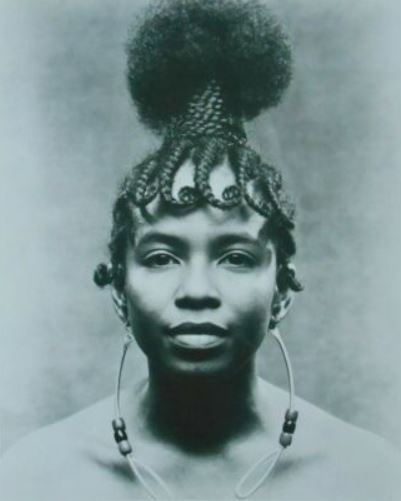
Wright, 1973

About a year later, Wright released her signature song "Clean Up Woman", written by Clarence Reid and Willie Clarke and recorded when she was 17. The record reached number two on the R&B charts, where it stayed for eight weeks. It crossed over to the pop charts, peaking at number six and staying on the Billboard Hot 100 for 14 weeks. It eventually sold over 1 million copies and was certified gold on December 30, 1971, nine days after the singer turned 18. Wright struggled with a successful follow-up until 1972 when the single "Baby Sitter" (one of Wright's first compositions) reached the top 50 of the Hot 100 and peaked at number six on the R&B charts. Another hit that emerged during this early period was 1973's "Let Me Be Your Lovemaker", which peaked at number 55 on the Hot 100 and number 10 on the R&B chart. It was the first instance (after "Baby Sitter") where Wright showed off her powerful whistle register vocals. Another successful composition was the proto-disco number "Where is the Love?" (co-written by Wright, with producers Harry Wayne Casey and Richard Finch, from KC & The Sunshine Band). This peaked at number 15 on the R&B chart, number-two on the dance charts and crossed over to the UK, peaking at number 25, leading Wright to perform overseas. Wright later won the Best R&B Song Grammy Award for composing "Where is the Love?".

A second prominent overseas hit was another proto-disco number "Shoorah! Shoorah!", issued on Alston and written by Allen Toussaint. Both songs appeared on one of Wright's most popular albums, Danger High Voltage, released in late 1974.

==== Danger High Voltage ====
Recorded at Criteria Studios in Miami, Danger High Voltage was produced by regular collaborators Willie Clarke, Clarence Reid and Steve Alaimo, along with Harry Wayne Casey and Richard Finch of KC and the Sunshine Band. Horn and string arrangements were by session arranger Mike Lewis, with a backing band drawn from TK Records regulars including guitarist Willie "Little Beaver" Hale and keyboardists Latimore and Timmy Thomas. The album received a positive reception on release and has since been cited as among Wright's strongest work.

It was on this album that Wright had her most successful composition, with the smooth soul ballad "Tonight Is the Night", which Wright attributed to her first sexual experiences. The original version peaked at number 28 on the R&B chart. Four years later, Wright released a "live" version of the song. The remodeled version, which included a now-famous monologue and portions of Wright's 1970 hit "Pure Love", peaked at number 11 on the R&B chart in 1978.

In 1977, Wright discovered musician Peter Brown and sang background on Brown's hits "You Should Do It" and "Dance with Me" (where her vocals were prominently featured alongside Brown's) from the successful LP A Fantasy Love Affair. In 1978, she performed a duet with shock rocker Alice Cooper on the song "No Tricks", and a year later, opened for Bob Marley on the reggae star's Survival Tour.

=== 1980s and 1990s ===
Wright's other albums at the end of the 1970s were less successful, and by 1981, as TK began to struggle, she moved to a bigger label, signing with Epic, where her self-titled album was released. The album was notable for the minor Stevie Wonder-composed hit, "What Are You Gonna Do with It". The same year, she contributed vocals on Richard "Dimples" Fields' Dimples album, especially on the hit "She's Got Papers on Me". In 1983, she released the album Wright Back at You, which featured compositions by Marlon Jackson of the Jacksons. In 1985, Wright formed her own label, Miss B Records, issuing the album Sevens the following year. In 1988, Wright made history as the first black female artist to score a gold album on her own label, when her 1987 album, Mother Wit achieved that certification. The album contains the songs "No Pain, No Gain", which returned her to the top 20 on the R&B chart for the first time in a decade; and "After the Pain".

In 1990, she had a hit duet with Grayson Hugh on the remake of Champaign's 1981 hit "How 'Bout Us", and later arranged the harmonies for Gloria Estefan's "Coming Out of the Dark", which hit number 1 in 1991. Continuing to release solo material into the 1990s, her 1994 album B-Attitudes featured a remixed duet of Marvin Gaye's "Distant Lover". She then self-released several more recordings while still performing successfully as a live act.

=== 2000s and 2010s ===
In 2001, the compilation album The Very Best of Betty Wright was released, along with Fit for a King, her first studio album for several years. In 2008, Wright was featured on a Lil Wayne track titled "Playing with Fire". However, due to a lawsuit, the song was removed from the album online. In 2006, Wright appeared on the TV show Making the Band, appointed by Sean Combs as a vocal coach for new female group Danity Kane. She mentored several young singers and did vocal production for such artists as Gloria Estefan, Jennifer Lopez and Joss Stone. Along with co-producers Steve Greenberg and Michael Mangini, Wright was nominated for a 2005 Grammy Award in the Best Pop Album category for producing Joss Stone's album Mind Body & Soul.

Wright, Greenberg and Mangini also produced two tracks on Tom Jones's 2008 album 24 Hours: a cover of Bruce Springsteen's "The Hitter" and "More Than Memories", written by Stax legend Carla Thomas. The trio also produced the debut album by Diane Birch in 2009. In December 2010, Wright was given another Grammy Award nomination for the song "Go" on the Best Traditional R&B Vocal Performance. The album Betty Wright: The Movie, credited to Betty Wright and the Roots, produced by Wright and Ahmir Questlove Thompson was released November 15, 2011 on Ms. B Records/S-Curve Records. Betty Wright: The Movie also included collaborations with Joss Stone, Snoop Dogg, Lil Wayne and Lenny Williams. "Surrender", a track from the album, was nominated for a 2011 Grammy in the Best Traditional R&B Performance category. On New Year's Eve 2011, Wright appeared on the UK's BBC Two television channel, on the Jools's Annual Hootenanny show, backed by the Jools Holland Rhythm & Blue Orchestra. She performed her singles "Clean Up Woman" and "Shoorah! Shoorah!" alongside "In the Middle of the Game (Don't Change the Play)" from Betty Wright: The Movie. In 2017, Wright was honored with the National R&B Music Society Unsung Heroine Award at their Black Tie Gala & Awards Ceremony in Philadelphia, Pa. Paul Anthony and Bowlegged Lou of Full Force presented the award to her. Her last appearance was on the TV show Unsung on April 5, 2020, which was a month before her death.

== Personal life and death ==
Wright was married three times and had five children. In 1976, Wright married Jerome McCray and together they had a daughter. Wright and McCray divorced in 1981. Wright was married to Patrick Parker from 1982 until 1983 and together they had two children. Wright was married to Jamaican musician Noel Williams, better known as King Sporty, from 1985 until his death in 2015. Together Wright and Williams had two children. Her son Patrick Parker Jr. was killed on Christmas Day in 2005 in a shooting incident.

Wright died from cancer, on May 10, 2020, at her home in Miami, aged 66. The news of her death was first announced by her niece. Just two days earlier, fellow singer Chaka Khan had made a plea on Twitter saying "Calling all my #PrayWarriors. My beloved sister, Betty Wright @MsBettyWright, is now in need of all your prayers."

== Legacy ==
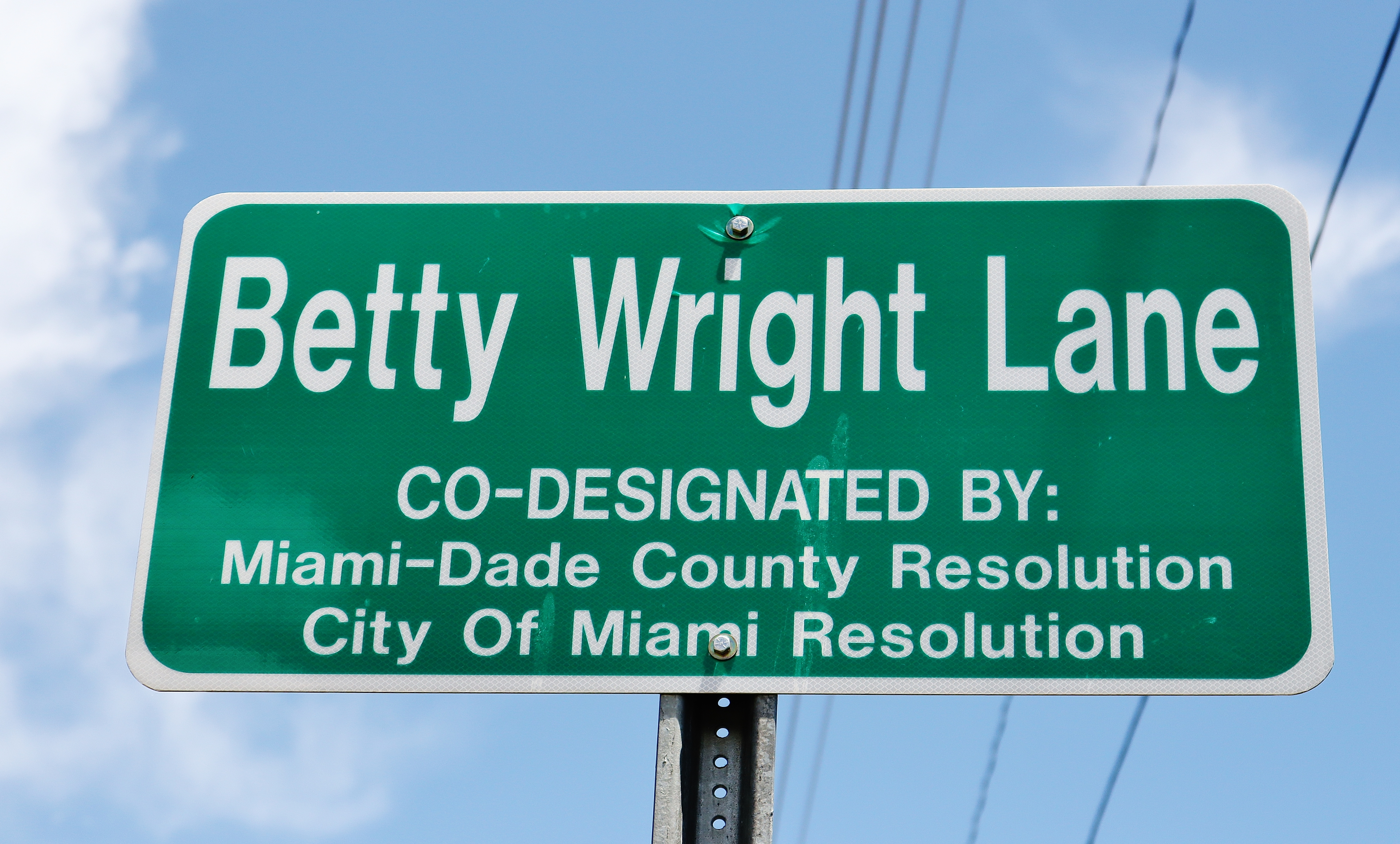
Betty Wright Lane in Miami

Several of Wright's works have been sampled over the years by hip hop, rock and R&B musicians. In 2008, Sheek Louch of The Lox used both the live version of "Tonight Is The Night" and "Pure Love" in his song "Good Love". In 1992, Wright sued the producers behind Color Me Badd's breakthrough hit "I Wanna Sex You Up" after claiming they used the sample of her live version without clearance and without permission, and sued for royalties. Wright won her case, winning 35% of royalties for writing the song.

Wright won the Grammy Award for Best R&B Song award for composing "Where is the Love?" at the 18th Annual Grammy Awards in 1976. She received one award from six nominations. Wright's biggest hit, "Clean Up Woman" was inducted into the Grammy Hall of Fame in 2021, giving Wright a second posthumous Grammy and a Hall of Fame honor.

== Discography ==
=== Studio and live albums ===
Year	Title	Peak chart positions			Record label
Year	Title	US	US R&B	CAN	Record label
1968	My First Time Around	―	―	―	Atco
1972	I Love the Way You Love	123	32	―	Alston
1973	Hard to Stop	―	54	―	Alston
1974	Danger High Voltage	―	―	―	Alston
1976	Explosion!	―	―	―	Alston
1977	This Time for Real	―	―	―	Alston
1978	Live	26	6	63	Alston
1979	Travelin' in the Wright Circle	138	48	―	Alston
1981	Betty Wright	―	54	―	Epic
1983	Wright Back at You	―	41	―	Epic
1986	Sevens	―	―	―	First String
1988	Mother Wit	127	28	―	Ms.B
1989	4U2NJOY	―	51	―	Ms.B
1990	Passion & ComPassion	―	―	―	Ms.B
1992	All the Way Live	―	―	―	Permanent
1994	B-Attitudes	―	―	―	Ms.B
2001	Fit for A King	―	―	―	Ms.B
2011	Betty Wright: The Movie (with the Roots)	197	27	―	Ms.B
2014	Living...Love...Lies	―	―	―	Ms.B
"—" denotes releases that did not chart.

=== Compilation albums ===
- The Very Best of Betty Wright (Rhino Records, 2000)
- The Essentials (Atlantic, 2002)

=== Singles ===
==== As lead artist ====
Year	Title	Peak chart positions					Certifications
Year	Title	US	US R&B	US Dance	CAN	UK	Certifications
1968	"Girls Can't Do What the Guys Do"	33	15	―	46	―	
1970	"Pure Love"	―	40	―	―	―	
1971	"I Love the Way You Love"	―	44	―	―	―	
1971	"Clean Up Woman"	6	2	―	39	―	RIAA: Gold
1972	"I'm Gettin' Tired Baby"	―	42	―	―	―	
1972	"If You Love Me Like You Say You Love Me"	―	21	―	―	―	
1972	"Is It You Girl"	―	18	―	―	―	
1972	"Baby Sitter"	46	6	―	―	―	
1973	"It's Hard to Stop (Doing Something When It's Good to You)"	72	11	―	―	―	
1973	"Let Me Be Your Lovemaker"	55	10	―	―	―	
1974	"It's Bad for Me to See You"	―	66	―	―	―	
1974	"Secretary"	62	12	―	―	―	
1974	"Shoorah! Shoorah!"	―	28	―	―	27	
1975	"Where is the Love?"	96	15	2	―	25	
1975	"Ooola La"	―	28	―	―	―	
1975	"Slip and Do It"	―	21	―	―	―	
1976	"If I Ever Do Wrong"	―	23	―	―	―	
1976	"Life "	―	64	―	―	―	
1977	"You Can't See for Looking"	―	73	―	―	―	
1978	"Tonight Is the Night (Pts. 1 & 2)"	―	11	―	―	―	
1978	"Lovin' Is Really My Game"	―	68	―	―	―	
1979	"My Love Is"	―	48	―	―	―	
1981	"What Are You Going to Do with It?"	―	42	61	―	―	
1981	"Goodbye You, Hello Him"	―	65	―	―	―	
1983	"She's Older Now"	―	22	―	―	―	
1984	"One Step Up, Two Steps Back"	―	75	35	―	―	
1985	"Sinderella"	―	―	21	―	―	
1985	"Pain"	―	44	―	―	42	
1986	"The Sun Don't Shine"	―	82	―	―	―	
1988	"No Pain, No Gain"	―	14	―	―	―	
1988	"After the Pain"	―	57	―	―	―	
1988	"From Pain to Joy"	―	39	―	―	―	
1989	"Quiet Storm"	―	88	―	―	―	
1989	"Keep Love New"	―	―	―	―	71	
1994	"For Love Alone"	―	98	―	―	―	
"—" denotes releases that did not chart or were not released in that territory.

==== As featured artist ====
Title	Year	Peak chart positions		Album
Title	Year	US	US R&B	Album
"After the Smoke Is Gone" (with Steve Alaimo)	1969	—	—	—N/a
"How 'Bout Us" (with Grayson Hugh)	1990	67	30	Blind to Reason
"Baby" (with Angie Stone)	2007	—	22	The Art of Love & War
"Holy Key" (DJ Khaled featuring Kendrick Lamar, Big Sean and Betty Wright)	2016	84	29	Major Key

==== As a studio background vocalist ====
- Benjamin Latimore – Latimore (1973) – her debut as a background singer
- Bill Wyman – Monkey Grip (1974)
- Gwen McCrae – Gwen McCrae (1974)
- Timmy Thomas – You're the Song I've Always Wanted to Sing (1974)
- Johnny Nash – Tears on My Pillow (1975)
- Milton Wright – Friends and Buddies (1975)
- Stephen Stills – Stills (1975)
- Timmy Thomas – Touch to Touch (1977)
- King Sporty – Mr. Rhythm (1977)
- Alice Cooper - “No Tricks” b-side non album track (1978)
- Peter Brown – A Fantasy Love Affair (1978)
- Philip & Lloyd – You've Got to Keep on Moving (1978)
- Latimore – "Goodbye Heartache" (1979) – released as a 12" single
- Gwen McCrae – Melody of Life (1979)
- Beverly Johnson – Don't Lose the Feeling (1979)
- Regina James – Alfie / Dancin' in the Flames of Love (1979) – released as a promo 12" single
- Stevie Wonder – Hotter than July (1980)
- Rachel Sweet – And Then He Kissed Me (1981)
- Richard "Dimples" Fields – Dimples (1981)
- Peter Tosh – Mama Africa (1983)
- K.C. – KC Ten (1983)
- Native – New World (1984)
- Timmy Thomas – Gotta Give a Little Love (Ten Years After) (1984)
- Sonny Okosun – Which Way Nigeria? (1984)
- Philip Michael Thomas – Living the Book of My Life (1985)
- Donna Allen – Perfect Timing (1986)
- Eddie Lovette – Rockers for Lovers Vol. II (1986)
- Margaret Reynolds – Call Me Sometime (1986) – released as a 12" single
- Gloria Estefan & the Miami Sound Machine – Let It Loose (1987)
- Nicole McCloud – Jam Packed (1988)
- Bigga – Earth People (1988)
- Gloria Estefan & the Miami Sound Machine – Anything for You (1988)
- Colin James – Colin James (1988)
- Jimmy Cliff – Images (1989)
- Tomi Jenkins – Tomi (1989)
- Nicole McCloud – Rock the House (1989)
- Angee Griffin – Gentle (1989)
- Clarence Clemons – A Night with Mr. C (1989)
- Gloria Estefan – Cuts Both Ways (1989)
- Pluto Shervington – Rhythm of the City (1990)
- Anthony Watson – 9 Days of Love (1991)
- Phyllis Hyman – Prime of My Life (1991)
- Chris Walker – First Time (1991)
- Gloria Estefan – Into the Light (1989)
- Shana Petrone – Turned Up on You (1992) – released as a 12" single
- Charles Christopher – Think About It (1992)
- Gerald Alston – Always in the Mood (1992)
- Regina Belle – Passion (1993)
- Jon Secada – Heart, Soul & a Voice (1994)
- José Luis Rodríguez El Puma – Razones Para Una Sonrisa (1994)
- Ophélie Winter – No Soucy ! (1996)
- Darrell Brown – "Money Makes It Happen" (1997) – released as a 12" single
- Cristian Castro – Lo Mejor de Mí (1997)
- David Byrne – Feelings (1997)
- Billie Myers – Growing, Pains (1997)
- Billie Myers – "Tell Me" (1997) – released as a CD promo single
- Gloria Estefan – Gloria! (1998)
- Bob Marley – Chant Down Babylon (1999)
- Jennifer Lopez – On the 6 (1999)
- Erykah Badu – Mama's Gun (2000)
- Cleptomaniacs featuring Bryan Chambers – "All I Do" (2001)
- Various – American Idol Greatest Moments (2001)
- Joss Stone – The Soul Sessions (2003)
- Joss Stone – Mind Body & Soul (2004)
- Angie Stone – Stone Love (2004)
- Ruby Baker – Love Is Worth It All (2004)
- Peter Gallagher – 7 Days in Memphis (2005)
- Nas & Damian Marley – Distant Relatives (2010)
- Paloma Faith – A Perfect Contradiction (2014)
- Nicole McCloud – Red Apples (2015)
- Elise Legrow – Playing Chess (2018)
