= Gwen McCrae =

American singer (1943–2025)

- Also known as: The Queen of Rare Groove
- Born: Gwendolyn Patricia Mosley; December 21, 1943; Pensacola, Florida, U.S.
- Died: February 21, 2025 (aged 81) Miami, Florida, U.S.
- Genres: Soul; R&B; gospel; disco; funk; post disco; rare groove
- Occupation: Singer
- Years active: 1969–2012
- Labels: Ichiban; TK; Atlantic
- Spouse: George McCrae (m. 1963)

Gwendolyn Patricia McCrae (née Mosley, December 21, 1943 – February 21, 2025) was an American singer. She is best known for her 1975 hit "Rockin' Chair", which reached number one on the Billboard Hot R&B chart and number nine on the Billboard Hot 100. Known across Europe as the "Queen of Rare Groove", McCrae's gospel, soul, disco, and funk vocals have been heavily sampled in dance music, including songs by Cassius, Madlib, Lady Gaga, Avicii, and Mobb Deep. The New York Times has credited her early 1970s hits as paving the way for disco music. She performed regularly in Europe until 2012, when a stroke paralyzed the left side of her body.

== Life and career ==
=== 1960s–1970s ===
Gwendolyn Patricia Mosley was born on December 21, 1943, in Pensacola, Florida, the youngest of five children. She and her siblings were raised by their mother, Winnie Mosley (née Lee), after the early death of their father, Aaron Mosley. She started singing in church at the age of seven and performed in clubs as a teenager with local groups such as the Lafayettes and the Independents. In 1963, she met a young sailor named George McCrae, whom she married within a week. The couple had two children together, Sophia and Leah, and she had two children from other relationships, Wanda and Alex.

Gwen and George McCrae formed a duo called George & Gwen in 1963 and began recording in 1967, when George returned home from the Navy. With the help of singer Betty Wright, they signed a record contract with Alston Records, a subsidiary of Henry Stone and Steve Alaimo's TK Records. Not long after, McCrae switched to Columbia Records to record southern soul music due to the duo's moderate success. When her soul endeavor was met with similar success, she returned to Alston Records to record lighter disco music that was characterized by a "Miami sound".

Signed to TK subsidiary Cat Records as a solo artist, she released a cover of Bobby Bland's "Lead Me On" in 1970, which peaked at 32 on the Billboard Hot Soul Singles chart. In 1972, she recorded the song "Always on My Mind", which was covered by numerous artists, including Elvis Presley, Willie Nelson, and the Pet Shop Boys. Her 1973 song "For Your Love" reached number 17 on the Billboard Hot Soul Singles chart.

Following husband George's solo success with "Rock Your Baby" in 1974, McCrae went on to have a major hit of her own in March 1975 with "Rockin' Chair", which reached number nine on the Billboard Hot 100 and number one on the Billboard Hot Soul Singles chart. Music critic Robert Christgau said "Rockin' Chair" is "almost as irresistibly Memphis-cum-disco-with-a-hook as hubby's 'Rock Your Baby.'" The follow-up single "Love Insurance" also made the Billboard Hot Soul Singles chart, peaking at number 16. In 1976, she and husband George recorded an album called "Together", on which The New York Times remarked that they "sound more like strangers than loving husband and wife". Because of their competing careers, they divorced that same year.

=== 1980s–1990s ===
After TK Records collapsed in 1981, McCrae moved to New Jersey and signed with Atlantic Records, recording two albums. Her song "Funky Sensation" reached number 22 on the Billboard Hot Soul Singles chart in 1981 and is considered her final successful song in the US. In 1982, she released the disco song "Keep the Fire Burning", which peaked at number five on the Billboard Dance Club chart and was a hit in UK dance clubs. Some of her earlier recordings on the UK's Northern Soul scene maintained her popularity as a live act in Europe. In 1984, McCrae moved back to Florida and recorded a one-off single for the small Black Jack label called "Do You Know What I Mean", then temporarily retired from the music industry.

McCrae traveled to the UK to record a couple of singles for Rhythm King Records in 1987. She also recorded an album for a British label called Homegrown Records in 1996, titled Girlfriend's Boyfriend. Upon returning to the US, she signed with the revived Goldwax label, distributed by Ichiban Records, and recorded another album, Psychic Hot Line.

In 1999, the French house music duo Cassius released the single "Feeling for You", which sampled the vocals of McCrae's "All This Love That I'm Giving". It was a Top 20 hit on the UK Singles Chart. The track also appeared on Cassius' album, 1999. In 1999, her single "Funky Sensation" was sampled in the German single "Get Up," by DJ Thomilla featuring Afrob.

=== 2000s and beyond ===
In 2000, McCrae released the single "Gittin' What I Want", which reached number 16 on the Billboard Hot R&B/Hip-Hop Singles Sales chart. McCrae released her first gospel album, I'm Not Worried, in 2004. In 2008, rap DJ and producer Madlib released his album WLIB AM: King of the Wigflip, which includes the song "Gamble on Ya Boy", based on an "I Found Love" sample from McCrae's album Melody of Life.

In 2005, McCrae teamed up with the Soulpower organization, which is also responsible for the comebacks of Marva Whitney, Lyn Collins, Martha High, Bobby Byrd and RAMP. Her collaboration with Soulpower resulted in various live performances with the Soulpower All-Stars. In 2007, she appeared on several songs on Sounding Rick’s “Living in the Acoustic Projects” and again on his 2009 album “Blabbermouth”.

McCrae released her single "Now I Found Love" in December 2010 through Plain Truth Entertainment. "Now I Found Love" was mixed and produced by Steve Sola and composed by David Seagal.{Reg.no. SR 666-530 Nov.21,2010} In June 2012, after performing on stage in England, she had a stroke that paralyzed the left side of her body and made her unable to walk.

"Keep the Fire Burning" was included in The Vinyl Factory's 2016 list of 'The 100 Greatest Disco 12″s of All Time. In August 2018, UK duo Disclosure released a cover of "Funky Sensation". In 2021, German musician Cody Currie and English musician Eliza Rose released "Another Love", which sampled "Keep the Fire Burning". In their review of "Another Love", Rolling Stone magazine called McCrae's song a "dancefloor classic" that is "relentlessly funky".

McCrae died at a care home in Miami on February 21, 2025, at the age of 81 after battling illness.

== Discography ==
=== Albums ===
Year	Album	Peak chart positions	
Year	Album	US	US R&B
1974	Gwen McCrae	—	—
1975	Rockin' Chair	121	18
1975	Together (with George McCrae)	—	33
1976	Something So Right	—	—
1978	Let's Straighten It Out	—	—
1979	Melody of Life	—	—
1981	Gwen McCrae	—	38
1982	On My Way	—	—
1996	Psychic Hotline	—	—
1997	Girlfriend's Boyfriend	—	—
1999	Still Rockin'	—	—
2004	I'm Not Worried	—	—
2006	Live in Paris at New Morning (with the Soulpower All-Stars)	—	—
2006	Gwen McCrae Sings TK	—	—
"—" denotes releases that did not chart.

=== Singles ===
Year	Single	Peak chart positions			
Year	Single	US Pop	US R&B	US Dance	UK
1970	"Lead Me On"	102	32	―	―
1972	"You Were Always on My Mind"	―	—	―	―
1972	"Leave the Driving to Us"	―	—	―	―
1973	"For Your Love"	―	17	―	―
1973	"He Keeps Something Groovy Goin' On"	―	—	―	―
1974	"Move Me Baby"	―	—	―	―
1974	"It's Worth the Hurt"	―	66	―	―
1975	"Love Insurance"	―	16	―	―
1975	"Rockin' Chair"	9	1	―	―
1975	"Let's Dance, Dance, Dance" (with George McCrae)	―	—	―	―
1976	"Cradle of Love"	―	53	―	―
1976	"Damn Right It's Good"	―	72	―	―
1976	"Winners Together or Losers Apart" (with George McCrae)	―	44	―	―
1978	"Starting All Over Again"	―	―	―	―
1979	"The Melody of Life"	―	―	―	―
1979	"All This Love That I'm Giving"	―	―	―	63
1981	"Funky Sensation"	―	22	15	92
1982	"Keep the Fire Burning"	―	60	5	―
1982	"I Need to Be with You"	―	―	―	―
1984	"Do You Know What I Mean?"	―	83	―	―
1993	"All This Love That I'm Giving" (with Music and Mystery)	―	―	―	36
2000	"Gittin' What I Want"	―	92	―	―
"—" denotes releases that did not chart or were not released in that territory.

== See also ==
- List of soul musicians
- List of disco artists (F–K)
- List of acts who appeared on American Bandstand
- List of artists who reached number one on the Billboard R&B chart
- List of 1970s one-hit wonders in the United States
