= No pain, no gain (disambiguation) =

No pain, no gain is an exercise motto.

No Pain, No Gain may also refer to:

== Film and television ==
- No Pain, No Gain (2001 film), a Spanish film
- No Pain, No Gain (2005 film), a comedy-drama film
- "No Pain, No Gain", part of the 1993 debut episode of Rocko's Modern Life
- "No Pain No Gain", a 2005 episode from series 7 of Holby City
- "No Pain No Gain", a 2008 episode from season 10 of MythBusters

== Music ==
- No Pain No Gain (album), 1998 album by Ghetto Twiinz
- "No Pain, No Gain" (song), 1988 single by Betty Wright
- "No Pain, No Gain", a song from 1986 album The Final Frontier by Keel
- "No Pain No Gain", 1987 single by The Whispers
- "No Pain No Gain," 1988 hit single by Betty Wright
- "No Pain No Gain", song from the 1988 album Prison Bound by Social Distortion
- "No Pain No Gain", song from the 1993 album Face the Heat by the Scorpions
- "No Pain No Gain", song from the 1994 album Funk Upon a Rhyme by Kokane
- "No Pain No Gain", song from the 1998 album Til My Casket Drops by C-Bo
- "No Pain No Gain", song from the 1998 album Everything Louder by Raven
- "No Pain, No Gain", song from the 2006 album Gem by Beni Arashiro

== See also ==
- Pain & Gain
