= Privacy (album) =

Studio album by Ophélie Winter
- Released: August 28, 1998
- Recorded: 1997–1998
- Genre: Pop
- Label: EastWest
- Producer: Soulshock & Karlin; Anders Bagge; Bandit; Nick Nice; Slick Harry; Rick Mitra; Lewis Taylor; Prince Charles Alexander; Bruce Purse; Cliff Branch

Ophélie Winter chronology
No Soucy ! (1996)	Privacy (1998)	Explicit Lyrics (2002)

Singles from Privacy
- 1. "Je Marche À L'Envers" Released: September 18, 1998; 2. "Elle Pleure" Released: November 24, 1998; 3. "Je t'abandonne" Released: October 26, 1999; 4. "Ce Que Je Suis" Released: February 22, 2000

Privacy is the second studio album by French singer, songwriter, and model Ophélie Winter. It was released on 28 August 1998 and was recorded from 1997 through to early 1998, enlisting various producers and songwriters worldwide such as Soulshock & Karlin, Guy Roche, Rick Mitra, Shelly Peiken, Anders Bagge, and Shana Morrison. Privacy encompasses pop rock, R&B, retro and contemporary pop. The album marked a drastic sound change from her previous effort, No Soucy !, as she departed from her earlier New Jack Swing style, which was her signature style, to a more polished pop and funk sound. Winter chose more personal and mature songs on the album that dealt with the themes of being in the public eye, relationships, love, women empowerment, and sexual abuse. Upon the release, the album was critically panned by critics and considered a sophomore slump compared to her previous effort.

== Background ==
Following the release of her successful debut album, No Soucy !, in 1996 as a result of hosting on variety shows such as M6, Dance Machine 4, and Hit Machine earlier in her career. This essentially catapulted her into more avenues of the limelight, she starred and appeared in numerous French films, most notably, Folle D'elle, Hommes, femmes, mode d'emploi, and Tout doit disparaître.

== Production ==
The album was recorded from 1997 through early 1998 and was recorded in France, Sweden, England as well as the United States.

== Release and promotion ==
Privacy was released on August 28, 1998, as a CD and Vinyl. Winter went on a promotional tour to support the album. A series of concerts were planned to be held at The Olympia in Paris and another venue in Toulouse, however, it was scrapped a couple of weeks before. Winter faced significant challenges with her failed tour. She was frequently stuck in Germany, Holland, Sweden due to the promotional tour. "Je Cours" was released as a promotional single in early 1999, however, due to lack of airplay, a music video was not produced and the song did not chart.

A deluxe edition, as well as a Digipack, were issued in late 1999. The reissue featured a slightly altered cover of the original album cover, as well as two new songs and remixes. The lead single for the reissue, "Je t'abandonne" was released on October 26, 1999. To promote the album, Winter appeared on several national talk shows and radio interviews. Most notably, Winter was the first presenter for the first ever NRJ Music Award which aired on January 22, 2000 in Cannes. "Ce Que Je Suis" was released as the last single from Privacy released on February 22nd of the same year. To promote the song as well the reissue, a series of commercials were issued on NRJ.

== Critical reception ==
Professional ratings
Review scores
Source	Rating
AllMusic	2.5/5 stars

Privacy was critically panned upon its release. Many criticized her stray from her signature sound, especially for the lead single "Je Marche A L'envers". Michael Ferreira of Allmusic noted the album lacked in production and writing compared to her debut album. He also stated that much of the album felt like was made of filler and contained a mixture of lacking jazz and funk songs and solid R&B and pop.

== Commercial performance ==
Privacy made a strong debut on the SNEP chart, entering at number twenty-five and marking the third-highest debut of the week, behind only the Titanic soundtrack and Zebda's Essence Ordinaire. In its second week, the album climbed to a peak position of number thirteen. The album underperformed compared to her previous effort, No Soucy !. Over the following six weeks, it gradually fell down the charts before exiting in October. However, it continued to reappear in the lower half of the chart throughout 1999. In total, Privacy spent thirteen weeks on the SNEP chart and was certified gold just three months after its release.

In Belgium, the album peaked at number twenty-nine and spent twenty weeks on the chart.

== Charts ==
Chart (1998–1999)	Peak position
French Albums (SNEP)	13
Belgian Albums (Ultratop Wallonia)	29

== Certifications ==
Certifications for Privacy
Region	Certification	Certified units/sales
France (SNEP)	Gold	100,000^{*}
^{*} Sales figures based on certification alone.
