= Henry Stone =

American record company executive (1921–2014)

- Born: Henry David Epstein; June 3, 1921; New York City, New York, U.S.
- Died: August 7, 2014 (aged 93) Miami, Florida, U.S.
- Occupations: Record producer, record company executive
- Years active: 1943–2014
- Website: henrystonemusic.com

Henry Stone (June 3, 1921 – August 7, 2014), born Henry David Epstein, was an American record company executive and producer whose career spanned the era from R&B in the early 1950s through the disco boom of the 1970s to the 2010s. He was best known as co-owner and president of TK Records, but reportedly set up more than 100 record labels, and generated more than $100 million in record sales across the world. Stone was described as "an acute businessman who always made sure that contracts and publishing agreements were written in his favor."

== Early life ==
Born in the Bronx as Henry David Epstein, Stone began playing the trumpet in his teens while at an orphanage in Pleasantville, New York. In 1943 he joined the US Army, playing in a racially integrated band and developing an appreciation of what were then called "race records". After being discharged in 1945, he changed his last name to Stone, moved to Los Angeles, and started working on sales and promotion for Jewel Records and then Modern Records, and traveling around the country. In 1947, he and his family moved to Miami, Florida.

== Record production and distribution in the 1950s and 1960s ==
In 1947, Stone settled in Miami, Florida, setting up his own distribution company, Seminole, and shortly afterwards the Crystal recording studio. In 1951 he recorded Ray Charles’ "St. Pete Florida Blues", among others. In 1952 he started two record labels, Rockin' (for blues) with artists including Earl Hooker, and Glory (for gospel), and soon had success in both styles. In association with King Records, Stone released The Charms’ "Hearts of Stone" on King's De Luxe Records subsidiary, and it became an R&B chart #1 hit in 1954. He was also instrumental in signing James Brown to King, and in recording Brown’s first hit "Please, Please, Please".

In 1955, he established his own independent publishing companies and several record labels, including Chart and Dade, mainly recording local blues artists. In 1960, Stone cut "(Do The) Mashed Potatoes" by "Nat Kendrick and the Swans" – actually James Brown's backing band - for the Dade label. He also set up Tone Distribution (originally Tru-Tone), which became one of the most successful record distribution companies, working with Atlantic, Motown, Stax and many more independent labels. Stone's distribution expertise was instrumental in spreading the music produced by those labels around the world. At its height, Tone occupied a full city block and a large warehouse in Hialeah, Florida, and employed over 100 people.

While he focused on the distribution business during the 1960s, Stone also continued to record R&B artists. These included Betty Wright, whose "Clean Up Woman" was a major hit in 1971 on his and Steve Alaimo's Alston label. Alaimo had previously recorded for Stone and been a Tone employee. Stone also set up the Glades label, recording the million selling hit "Why Can’t We Live Together" by Timmy Thomas. Stone established many different labels on the basis, he said, that it was easier to get records played if the radio stations did not realize they came from the same source.

== TK Records and associated activities ==
In 1972, Stone heard from Jerry Wexler that Warner Record's Atlantic and Elektra divisions would merge, handle its own distribution, and no longer use Tone. At that point, he decided to concentrate on recording and manufacturing his own records, forming another new record company, TK Records with Alaimo (named after the studio's recording console designer Terry Kane), based in Hialeah, with which he had his greatest success.

In 1973, Stone’s warehouse worker and occasional front desk receptionist, Harry Wayne “KC” Casey and TK's budding recording studio engineer Richard Finch were introduced by Stone and began collaborating on writing and performing songs, with Stone allowing them to experiment in the recording studio after hours. As KC and the Sunshine Band, they released a string of hits including "Get Down Tonight", "That's The Way I Like It" and "Shake Your Booty", all on Stone's TK label. The band had five number one pop singles, platinum albums, won three Grammys and one American Music Award. Prior to the success of KC and the Sunshine Band, Casey and Finch wrote and produced the number one hit, "Rock Your Baby" by George McCrae, and his follow-ups. "Rock Your Baby" is credited as being the very first disco hit record.

Stone’s companies produced numerous other hits during the 1970s, including The Beginning of the End's "Funky Nassau" (on Alston), Latimore's "Let's Straighten It Out" (on Glades), Anita Ward's "Ring My Bell" (on Juana), Little Beaver's "Party Down" and Gwen McCrae's "Rockin’ Chair" (both on Cat), Peter Brown's "Do Ya Wanna Get Funky With Me" (on Drive), and Bobby Caldwell's "What You Won't Do for Love" (on Clouds).

== Later activities ==
By the late 1970s, the TK Records and its sister labels became pre-eminent in the dance and pop music scene, but suffered badly from the anti-disco movement which followed. TK Records ceased operating by 1981, and Stone went into partnership with Morris Levy of Roulette Records, Joe Robinson of Sugar Hill Records, and Tom Ficara of Combined Artists to form the Sunnyview label, issuing records by funk and rap artists such as Newcleus. Stone later became involved with Hot Productions in the reissue of dance classics on CD. Recently, he continued reissuing R&B and dance tracks on his own label, The Legendary Henry Stone Presents...

== Honors ==
In 2004, Henry Stone was awarded the first ever Pioneer Award for the Dance Music Hall of Fame, which was presented in New York City. When he was invited on stage to receive his award and give a speech he received a lengthy standing ovation.

== Death ==
Stone died of natural causes in Miami on August 7, 2014, at the age of 93. He is buried at Riverside-Gordon Memorial Gardens in North Miami Beach.

== Music publishing imprints of Henry Stone ==
Stone owned a music publishing company bearing the name Sherlyn Music (and Sherlyn-Pent Music). He and his first wife had two daughters, Sheri and Linda. The name Sherlyn was a portmanteau of their daughters' given names. He also had 2 additional daughters, Crystal and Kim, as well as a son, David
