= Orgone (band) =

American funk group

- Origin: Los Angeles, California
- Genres: Funk, soul, Afrobeat
- Years active: 1999–present
- Label: Shanachie
- Members: Sergio Rios (guitar); Adryon de León (vocals); Dan Hastie (keyboards); Sam Halterman (drums); Dale Jennings (bass)
- Past members: Niki J Crawford (vocals); Stewart Killen (percussion); Devin Williams (trumpet); Ethan Phillips (bass); Fanny Franklin (vocals); Sean O'Shea (drums); Joel Bowers (saxophone); Tim Glum (bass); Darren Cardoza (trombone)
- Website: orgonespace.com

Orgone is an American band from Los Angeles, California.

Several members of the band played together from the early 1990s, and Orgone became a regular band in 1999. Many of their early gigs were as a backing band for hip-hop musicians. After a 2001 debut release, the band added vocalist Fanny Franklin to do a cover of "Funky Nassau" by the Beginning of the End; she remained as a full-time member, although much of their music is instrumental. The group released its second album The Killion Floor in 2007, which featured "Funky Nassau" as well as covers of "Do Your Thing" by Isaac Hayes and "I Get Lifted" by Harry Wayne Casey of K.C. and the Sunshine Band. In 2010 the band opened for Sharon Jones & the Dap-Kings on tour.

== Discography ==
- Orgone (Self-released, 2001)
- The Killion Floor (Ubiquity Records, 2007)
- Bacano (Self-released, 2008)
- Cali Fever (Ubiquity Records, 2010)
- Killion Vaults (Ubiquity Records, 2010)
- Fuzzed Up (Self-released, 2012)
- New You (Self-released, 2013)
- Beyond The Sun (LP: Colemine Records; CD: Shanachie Records, 2015)
- Undercover Mixtape (LP/CD: Colemine Records, 2018)
- Reasons (3 Palm Records, 2019)
- Connection (3 Palm Records, 2020)
- Raw & Direct (3 Palm Records, 2020)
- Moonshadows (3 Palm Records, 2021)
- Lost Knights (3 Palm Records, 2022)
- Chimera (3 Palm Records, 2024)

== Links ==
1. Orgone official website.
