= Girls Can't Do What the Guys Do =

- Side A of the US single

Single by Betty Wright

from the album My First Time Around
- B-side: "Sweet Lovin' Daddy"
- Released: 1968
- Recorded: 1968
- Genre: R&B
- Length: 2:07
- Label: Alston Records
- Songwriters: Willie Clarke; Clarence Reid
- Producers: Steve Alaimo; Brad Shapiro

Betty Wright singles chronology
"Paralyzed" (1966)	"Girls Can't Do What the Guys Do" (1968)	"Pure Love" (1970)

"Girls Can't Do What the Guys Do" is a single by American recording artist Betty Wright from her debut studio album My First Time Around (1968). It was written by Willie Clarke and Clarence Reid, and released in 1968 by Alston Records.

== Background ==
"Girls Can't Do What the Guys Do" is a song written by Willie Clarke and Clarence Reid. It was arranged by Ray Love and produced by Brad Shapiro and Steve Alaimo for Wright's recording, which was released as a 7-inch single in 1968 by Alston Records—it was Wright's first release under that label. The B-side for the single was "Sweet Lovin' Daddy". The song's theme was unpopular with the feminist movement, according to Andrew Hamilton from AllMusic.

== Reception ==
"Girls Can't Do What the Guys Do" peaked at number thirty-three on the US Billboard Hot 100, and at number fifteen on the US Hot Rhythm & Blues Singles. In Canada, the song reached number 46.

== Other versions ==
- The song was recorded by Dusty Springfield for her 1972 studio album See All Her Faces. Yellowman recorded it for King Yellowman (1984).

== Samples ==
- "Girls Can't Do What the Guys Do" is sampled in "Upgrade U" by Beyoncé and Jay-Z, from Beyoncé's album B'Day (2006) and in "No Homo Outro", a track from Turtleneck & Chain (2011) by The Lonely Island as well as "Pussy" by Latto (2022)
