= Can't Forget You =

Can't Forget You may refer to:

- "Can't Forget You" (Gloria Estefan song), 1991
- "Can't Forget You" (Sonia song), 1989
