= Je Marche À L'Envers =

Single by Ophélie Winter

from the album Privacy
- B-side: "Dans Mon Intimité"
- Released: 18 September 1998
- Recorded: 1998
- Studio: Studio Plus XXX (Paris, France)
- Genre: Pop rock
- Length: 3:08
- Label: EastWest
- Songwriters: Jeff Pennig; Michael Lunn; Shana Morrison; Ophélie Winter
- Producers: Anders Bagge; Bandit; Nick Nice; Slick Harry

"Je Marche À L'Envers" is a song by French singer and actress Ophélie Winter from her second studio album, Privacy (1998). It was released as the album's lead single on 18 September 1998. The song was written by Winter, Jeff Pennig, Michael Lunn, and Shana Morrison.

The song was accompanied by a music video directed by Tom Kan. The video featured Winter walking backward through surreal and futuristic abstract settings in a distinctive red wig.

== Commercial performance ==
"Je Marche À L'Envers" was met with lukewarm success on the SNEP chart. The song debuted at number 67, becoming her first song to not debut in the half of the chart. In its third week on the chart, the song peaked at number 23. The song charted for a total 16 weeks in France.

The song fared better in Belgium, where it peaked at number 12 and stayed on the charts for 15 weeks.

== Charts ==
Chart (1998–1999)	Peak position
France (SNEP)	23
Belgium	12
