= Into the Light (Gloria Estefan album) =

Studio album by Gloria Estefan
- Released: January 29, 1991
- Recorded: 1990
- Studio: Crescent Moon Studios (Miami, Florida)
- Genre: Pop
- Length: 52:07
- Label: Epic
- Producer: Emilio Estefan, Jr.; Jorge Casas; Clay Ostwald

Gloria Estefan chronology
Éxitos de Gloria Estefan (1990)	Into the Light (1991)	Greatest Hits (1992)

Singles from Into the Light
- 1. "Coming Out of the Dark" Released: January 1991; 2. "Seal Our Fate" Released: April 1991; 3. "Can't Forget You" Released: June 1991; 4. "Remember Me with Love" Released: June 1991 (UK); 5. "Nayib's Song (I Am Here for You)" Released: July 1991 (Europe); 6. "Live for Loving You" Released: September 1991

Professional ratings
Review scores
Source	Rating
AllMusic	3/5 stars
Entertainment Weekly	C+
Los Angeles Times	2/4 stars
Melody Maker	(favorable)
NME	7/10
Orlando Sentinel	2/5 stars
The Rolling Stone Album Guide	2/5 stars
The Windsor Star	C

Into the Light is the second studio solo album released by American singer Gloria Estefan, but is her 14th overall, released on January 29, 1991, by Epic Records. The album reached number five on the US Billboard 200, becoming her highest peaking album on the chart. Into the Light has sold over 2 million copies in United States.

The album includes the Billboard Hot 100 number one single "Coming Out of the Dark". Follow-up single "Can't Forget You" peaked at number 2 on the Billboard Adult Contemporary chart.

== Background ==
Into the Light followed her successful 1989 album Cuts Both Ways, and the near-tragic accident Estefan experienced during the "Get on Your Feet Tour". The theme of the title track was bouncing back from the darkness of disaster. The album received commercial success, and has sold 1.8 million copies in United States according to Nielsen Soundscan.

== Track listing ==
All tracks are written by Gloria Estefan, except where noted.

No.	Title	Writer(s)	Length
1.	"Coming Out of the Dark"	G. Estefan; Emilio Estefan Jr.; Jon Secada	4:05
2.	"Seal Our Fate"		4:25
3.	"What Goes Around"	Clay Ostwald; Jorge Casas; Secada	4:04
4.	"Nayib's Song (I Am Here for You)"		4:39
5.	"Remember Me with Love"		4:36
6.	"Heart with Your Name on It"	Diane Warren	4:46
7.	"Sex in the 90's"	G. Estefan; Secada	3:43
8.	"Close My Eyes"		4:29
9.	"Language of Love"	Warren	4:15
10.	"Light of Love"	Secada; Randy Barlow	3:52
11.	"Can't Forget You"	Casas; Secada; Clay Ostwald	4:15
12.	"Live for Loving You"	G. Estefan; E. Estefan; Warren	4:37
13.	"Mama Yo Can't Go"	Secada; Tom McWilliams; Scott Shapiro	3:33
14.	"Desde La Oscuridad" (Coming Out of the Dark) (Spanish version)	G. Estefan; E. Estefan; Secada	4:09
Total length:			52:07

Europe, UK and South Africa CD and Cassette bonus tracks
No.	Title	Writer(s)	Length
15.	"Se Tenho Que Te Perder" (Don't Wanna Lose You) (Portuguese version)	G. Estefan; Aloysio Reis	4:20
16.	"Words Get in the Way" (live in Miami) (from Homecoming Concert, 1988)		5:02
Total length:			68:50

Japan CD and MiniDisc bonus tracks
No.	Title	Writer(s)	Length
15.	"Amour Fatal" (Your Love Is Bad for Me) (Portuguese version)	G. Estefan; Reis	3:49
16.	"Words Get in the Way" (live in Miami (from Homecoming Concert, 1988)		5:02

Australian limited tour edition bonus CD and Cassette – Love Songs
No.	Title	Length
1.	"Anything for You"	4:03
2.	"Cuts Both Ways"	3:16
3.	"Here We Are"	4:51
4.	"Words Get in the Way"	3:27
5.	"Can't Stay Away from You"	3:57
6.	"Don't Wanna Lose You"	4:12

=== Notes ===
- "Language of Love" was excluded from US and Canadian editions.

== Personnel ==
- Gloria Estefan – vocals, backing vocals (3–5, 7–13), BGV arrangements (5), arrangements (8, 12)
- Clay Ostwald – programming (1, 3–6, 8–14), arrangements (1, 3, 5, 8, 10–14), additional programming (2), acoustic piano (3, 4), additional arrangements (4, 6, 9), keyboards (6, 8, 11, 13), keyboard solo (6)
- Angelo Morris – acoustic piano (1, 14)
- Jorge Casas – programming (1, 3–6, 8–14), bass (1–7, 10, 11, 13, 14), arrangements (1, 3, 5, 8, 10–14), fretless bass (4, 12) additional arrangements (4, 6, 9), acoustic guitar (12)
- Tom McWilliams – programming (2, 4, 9), arrangements (2, 4, 9), drum overdubs (2)
- Scott Shapiro – programming (2, 4, 9), guitars (2), guitar solo (2), arrangements (2, 4, 9)
- Brian Monroney – guitars (1, 3, 7, 8, 11, 14), guitar solo (11)
- John De Faria – guitars (4–9, 13), guitar solo (8, 13)
- Juan Márquez – 12-string guitar (10)
- Robert Rodriguez – drums (1, 14)
- Emilio Estefan Jr. – congas (3), arrangements (12)
- Rafael Padilla – percussion (4, 5, 8–10), shaker (6)
- Mike Scaglione – saxophones (2), alto sax solo (3, 7, 10, 13)
- Teddy Mulet – trombone (2, 13), trumpet (10)
- Randy Barlow – trumpet (2, 10, 13), programming (7, 10), arrangements (7, 10)
- Arturo Sandoval – trumpet solo (10, 13)
- Keith Cohen – additional arrangements (3)
- Phil Ramone – additional arrangements (3, 8)
- Guy Roche – arrangements (6)
- Anita Faye Green – backing vocals (1, 2, 5, 6, 14)
- Clovette Hilton – backing vocals (1, 14)
- Namphuyo Aisha McCray – backing vocals (1, 14)
- Carl Ramsey – backing vocals (1, 5, 6, 14)
- Jon Secada – backing vocals (1, 3, 7, 9, 13, 14), programming (2, 10), arrangements (2–4, 9, 10), BGV arrangements (3), additional arrangements (11)
- Rod Wilson – backing vocals (1, 2, 5, 6, 14)
- Betty Wright – backing vocals (1–3, 5–7, 14), BGV arrangements (1, 3, 5, 14)
- Jeannete Wright Black – backing vocals (1, 2, 5, 6, 14)

=== Production ===
- Emilio Estefan Jr. – producer
- Jorge Casas – producer
- Clay Ostwald – producer
- Eric Schilling – engineer, mixing (1, 2, 4–10, 12, 13)
- Patrice Levinsohn – additional engineer
- Charles Dye – assistant engineer
- Doug Grover – assistant engineer
- Phil Ramone – mixing (1, 2, 14)
- Keith Cohen – mixing (3)
- Mike Couzzi – mixing (11)
- Pablo Flores – mixing (13)
- Bob Ludwig – mastering at Masterdisk (New York, NY)
- Nancy Donald – art direction
- Mary Maurer – art direction
- Alberto Tolot – photography
- Eric Bernard – hair, make-up

== Charts ==
=== Weekly charts ===
Chart (1991)	Peak position
Australian Albums (ARIA)	9
Austrian Albums (Ö3 Austria)	30
Canadian Albums (RPM)	18
Dutch Albums (Album Top 100)	2
European Albums (Music & Media)	6
German Albums (Offizielle Top 100)	19
New Zealand Albums (RMNZ)	13
Norwegian Albums (VG-lista)	18
Spanish Albums (Promusicae)	18
Swedish Albums (Sverigetopplistan)	17
Swiss Albums (Schweizer Hitparade)	6
UK Albums (OCC)	2
US Billboard 200	5
US Latin Pop Albums (Billboard)	23
US Top R&B/Hip-Hop Albums (Billboard)	64
US Cashbox Top Pop Albums	3

=== Year-end charts ===
Chart (1991)	Position
Australian Albums (ARIA)	30
Canadian Albums (RPM)	75
Dutch Albums (Album Top 100)	10
German Albums (Offizielle Top 100)	77
US Billboard 200	40

== Certifications ==
Region	Certification	Certified units/sales
Australia (ARIA)	2× Platinum	140,000^{^}
Canada (Music Canada)	Platinum	100,000^{^}
Japan (RIAJ)	Gold	100,000^{^}
Netherlands (NVPI)	Platinum	100,000^{^}
Spain (Promusicae)	Gold	50,000^{^}
United Kingdom (BPI)	Platinum	300,000^{^}
United States (RIAA)	2× Platinum	2,000,000^{^}
^{^} Shipments figures based on certification alone.

== Release history ==
Country	Release date
Canada	January 28, 1991
Latin America	January 28, 1991
United States	January 29, 1991
Australia	January 29, 1991
Japan	January 25, 1991
Europe and United Kingdom	February 4, 1991
