= Mother Wit =

1988 studio album by Betty Wright

Studio album by Betty Wright
- Released: 1988
- Recorded: 1987
- Genre: R&B
- Length: 43:43
- Label: Ms.B
- Producer: Betty Wright; Noel Williams

Betty Wright chronology
Sevens (1986)	Mother Wit (1988)	4U2NJOY (1989)

Singles from Mother Wit
- 1. "No Pain, No Gain" Released: 1988; 2. "After the Pain" Released: 1988

Mother Wit is the twelfth studio album by American rhythm and blues singer Betty Wright, released in 1988 via Wright's own record label Ms.B Records. Co-produced by Wright herself, the album peaked at #127 on the Billboard 200 and #28 on the Billboard R&B chart.

Two singles were released from Mother Wit: "No Pain, No Gain" and "After the Pain". "No Pain, No Gain" was the most successful single from the album, peaking at #14 on the Billboard R&B chart in 1988.

== Track listing ==
All lyrics are written by Betty Wright, unless otherwise noted

No.	Title	Writer(s)	Length
1.	"After the Pain"		6:56
2.	"No Pain, No Gain"		5:12
3.	"Ms. Time"		4:21
4.	"Love Days"		4:44
5.	"Miami Groove"	Wright; Morris; Everheart; Taylor	4:45
6.	"Unsolicited Advise"		4:10
7.	"Shoot It From the Hip"	Caldwell; Williams	4:15
8.	"Fakin' Moves"	Wright; Meriwether	5:12
9.	"Say It Again"	Sigler	4:08
Total length:			43:43
