= Live for Loving You =

- US, Australia and Japan cover art

Single by Gloria Estefan

from the album Into the Light
- B-side: "Live For Loving You (Underground Club Edit)"
- Released: September 30, 1991
- Recorded: 1990
- Studio: Crescent Moon Studios (Miami, Florida)
- Genre: Pop (album version); Latin pop; dance-pop; (underground club edit)
- Length: 4:37 (album version); 4:30 (underground club edit)
- Label: Epic
- Songwriters: Gloria Estefan; Emilio Estefan; Diane Warren
- Producers: Emilio Estefan; Jorge Casas; Clay Ostwald

Gloria Estefan singles chronology
"Can't Forget You" (1991)	"Live for Loving You" (1991)	"Always Tomorrow" (1992)

Music video
- "Live for Loving You" on YouTube

"Live for Loving You" is a song by Cuban–American singer-songwriter Gloria Estefan. It was released on September 30, 1991 by Epic Records worldwide as the fifth and final single from her second solo album, Into the Light (1991). The song was written by Estefan, her husband Emilio Estefan, Jr. and Diane Warren, and produced by Estefan, Jr., Jorge Casas and Clay Ostwald. Estefan dedicated the song to her husband, like she did with "Coming Out of the Dark", "How Can I Be Sure" and "Hoy". "Live for Loving You" peaked at number 22 on the US Billboard Hot 100 and was the first single from the album to appear on the dance music charts.

== Critical reception ==
Scottish Aberdeen Press and Journal wrote that "Live for Loving You" has a "great feel to it and nice vocals from the Latin American queen of rock. Makes you feel as though like you're on a tropical island". In a retrospective review, Matthew Hocter from Albumism named it one of three singles, that "truly stand out" of the album, noting its "infectious pop sound". Also AllMusic editor Jason Birchmeier highlighted the song, with its "memorable" and "cooing singalong". Larry Flick from Billboard magazine named it a "formidable return to her dance roots." Henderson and DeVaney from Cashbox called it a "happy, innocuous, mid-tempo, slightly Caribbean-flavored pop song".

The Daily Vault's Mark Millan complimented it as a "sweet" song, naming it one of three "real hits" of the album, with "Coming Out of the Dark" and "Seal Our Fate". Pan-European magazine Music & Media constated that Estefan "waits for the second verse to add her well known Latin influences. Up to then, the overall feel is more African. Suddenly a piano slips in and the rhythm changes slightly. This clever arrangement adds to the song's excitement." A reviewer from Music Week described it as a "bouncy insubstantial number which recalls her earlier work", and added, "A hit for sure".

== Music video ==
A music video was produced to promote the single. It is set in an animated Miami setting and features Gloria's Dalmatian dog, her husband, and her son. A video was also produced for the "Underground Remix". The original video is included in the Everlasting Gloria video collection.

== Official versions and remixes ==
Original Versions

1. Album Version — (4:37)
2. 2007 iTunes Originals Version — (4:14)

Pablo Flores & Javier Garza Remixes

1. Single Remix (aka Remix) — (4:19)
2. Pablo Flores 12" — (7:10)
3. South of the Border Mix — (7:11)
4. South of the Border Percapella — (4:37)

Tommy Musto Remixes

1. Underground Club Remix — (7:16)
2. Underground Club Edit — (4:30)
3. Live For Clubbing You — (6:35)
4. Live For Dubbing You — (4:35)

John Haag Remixes

1. John Haag's 12" — (6:49)

== Charts ==
Chart (1991)	Peak position
Australia (ARIA)	68
Europe (Eurochart Hot 100)	94
Europe (European Hit Radio)	37
Japan (Japanese Singles Chart)	57
Netherlands (Dutch Top 40 Tipparade)	13
Netherlands (Single Top 100)	54
UK Singles (OCC)	33
UK Airplay (Music Week)	7
US Billboard Hot 100	22
US Hot Adult Contemporary Tracks (Billboard)	2
US Hot Dance Music/Maxi-Singles Sales (Billboard)	9
US Cash Box Top 100	11

== Formats and track listings ==
US & Canada Cassette Single (34T 73962) [September 1991]
No.	Title	Writer(s)	Length
1.	"Live For Loving You" (Remix)	Gloria Estefan, Emilio Estefan, Jr. & Diane Warren	4:19
2.	"Live For Loving You" (Underground Club Edit)	Gloria Estefan, Emilio Estefan, Jr. & Diane Warren	4:30

US & Canada 7" Vinyl Single (34 73962) [September 1991]
No.	Title	Writer(s)	Length
1.	"Live For Loving You" (Remix)	Gloria Estefan, Emilio Estefan, Jr. & Diane Warren	4:19
2.	"Live For Loving You" (Underground Club Edit)	Gloria Estefan, Emilio Estefan, Jr. & Diane Warren	4:30

US & Canada 12" Vinyl Single (49 73971) [September 1991]
No.	Title	Writer(s)	Length
1.	"Live For Loving You" (Underground Club Mix)	Gloria Estefan, Emilio Estefan, Jr. & Diane Warren	7:22
2.	"Live For Loving You" (Live For Clubbing You Mix)	Gloria Estefan, Emilio Estefan, Jr. & Diane Warren	6:35
3.	"Live For Loving You" (Live For Dubbing You Mix)	Gloria Estefan, Emilio Estefan, Jr. & Diane Warren	4:53
4.	"Live For Loving You" (South of the Border Mix)	Gloria Estefan, Emilio Estefan, Jr. & Diane Warren	7:11
5.	"Live For Loving You" (South of the Border Percapella)	Gloria Estefan, Emilio Estefan, Jr. & Diane Warren	4:43
6.	"MSM Megamix" (Dr. Beat, Conga, Primitive Love, 1-2-3, Get On Your Feet, Rhythm Is Gonna Get You)	Enrique E. Garcia, Lawrence Dermer, Joe Galdo, Rafael Vigil, Gloria Estefan, John De Faria, Jorge Casas, Clay Ostwald	7:40

US Promo CD Single (ESK 73962) [September 1991]
No.	Title	Writer(s)	Length
1.	"Live For Loving You" (LP Version)	Gloria Estefan, Emilio Estefan, Jr. & Diane Warren	4:37
2.	"Live For Loving You" (Underground Club Edit)	Gloria Estefan, Emilio Estefan, Jr. & Diane Warren	4:30
3.	"Live For Loving You" (Remix)	Gloria Estefan, Emilio Estefan, Jr. & Diane Warren	4:19
4.	"Live For Loving You" (Underground Club Mix)	Gloria Estefan, Emilio Estefan, Jr. & Diane Warren	7:16

Europe CD Maxi-Single (EPC 657382 5) [October 1991]
No.	Title	Writer(s)	Length
1.	"Live For Loving You" (Single Remix)	Gloria Estefan, Emilio Estefan, Jr. & Diane Warren	4:19
2.	"Live For Loving You" (South of the Border Percapella)	Gloria Estefan, Emilio Estefan, Jr. & Diane Warren	4:37
3.	"Miami Sound Machine Megamix" (Dr. Beat, Conga, Primitive Love, 1-2-3, Get On Your Feet, Rhythm Is Gonna Get You)	Enrique E. Garcia, Lawrence Dermer, Joe Galdo, Rafael Vigil, Gloria Estefan, John De Faria, Jorge Casas, Clay Ostwald	7:35

Europe 7" Vinyl Single (657382 7) [October 1991]
No.	Title	Writer(s)	Length
1.	"Live For Loving You" (Single Remix)	Gloria Estefan, Emilio Estefan, Jr. & Diane Warren	4:19
2.	"Live For Loving You" (Album Version)	Gloria Estefan, Emilio Estefan, Jr. & Diane Warren	4:37

Europe 12" Vinyl Single (EPC 657382 6) [October 1991]
No.	Title	Writer(s)	Length
1.	"Live For Loving You" (Single Remix)	Gloria Estefan, Emilio Estefan, Jr. & Diane Warren	4:19
2.	"Live For Loving You" (South of the Border Percapella)	Gloria Estefan, Emilio Estefan, Jr. & Diane Warren	4:37
3.	"Miami Sound Machine Megamix" (Dr. Beat, Conga, Primitive Love, 1-2-3, Get On Your Feet, Rhythm Is Gonna Get You)	Enrique E. Garcia, Lawrence Dermer, Joe Galdo, Rafael Vigil, Gloria Estefan, John De Faria, Jorge Casas, Clay Ostwald	7:35

Spain Promo 7" Vinyl Single (ARIE 3051) [October 1991]
No.	Title	Writer(s)	Length
1.	"Live For Loving You" (Single Remix)	Gloria Estefan, Emilio Estefan, Jr. & Diane Warren	4:19

UK CD Maxi-Single No. 1 (657382 5) [September 16, 1991]
No.	Title	Writer(s)	Length
1.	"Live For Loving You" (Single Remix)	Gloria Estefan, Emilio Estefan, Jr. & Diane Warren	4:19
2.	"Live For Loving You" (John Haag's 12")	Gloria Estefan, Emilio Estefan, Jr. & Diane Warren	6:49
3.	"Live For Loving You" (Pablo Flores' 12")	Gloria Estefan, Emilio Estefan, Jr. & Diane Warren	7:10

UK CD Maxi-Single No. 2 (Limited Edition Special CD Pack) [657382 9] {September 16, 1991}
No.	Title	Writer(s)	Length
1.	"Live For Loving You" (Underground Club Mix)	Gloria Estefan, Emilio Estefan, Jr. & Diane Warren	7:16
2.	"Live For Loving You" (South of the Border Mix)	Gloria Estefan, Emilio Estefan, Jr. & Diane Warren	4:37
3.	"Miami Sound Machine Megamix" (Dr. Beat, Conga, Primitive Love, 1-2-3, Get On Your Feet, Rhythm Is Gonna Get You)	Enrique E. Garcia, Lawrence Dermer, Joe Galdo, Rafael Vigil, Gloria Estefan, John De Faria, Jorge Casas, Clay Ostwald	7:10

UK Cassette Single (657382 4) [September 16, 1991]
No.	Title	Writer(s)	Length
1.	"Live For Loving You" (Single Remix)	Gloria Estefan, Emilio Estefan, Jr. & Diane Warren	4:19
2.	"Live For Loving You" (Album Version)	Gloria Estefan, Emilio Estefan, Jr. & Diane Warren	4:37

UK 7" Vinyl Single (657382 7) [September 16, 1991]
No.	Title	Writer(s)	Length
1.	"Live For Loving You" (Single Remix)	Gloria Estefan, Emilio Estefan, Jr. & Diane Warren	4:19
2.	"Live For Loving You" (Album Version)	Gloria Estefan, Emilio Estefan, Jr. & Diane Warren	4:37

Costa Rica Promo 7" Vinyl Single (7162791)
No.	Title	Writer(s)	Length
1.	"Live For Loving You" (Album Version)	Gloria Estefan, Emilio Estefan, Jr. & Diane Warren	4:37
2.	"Live For Loving You" (Album Version)	Gloria Estefan, Emilio Estefan, Jr. & Diane Warren	4:37

Australia CD Single (657382 2) [October 1991]
No.	Title	Writer(s)	Length
1.	"Live For Loving You" (Single Remix)	Gloria Estefan, Emilio Estefan, Jr. & Diane Warren	4:19
2.	"Live For Loving You" (Album Mix)	Gloria Estefan, Emilio Estefan, Jr. & Diane Warren	4:37

Australia CD Maxi-Single (657382 5) [October 1991]
No.	Title	Writer(s)	Length
1.	"Live For Loving You" (Underground Club Mix)	Gloria Estefan, Emilio Estefan, Jr. & Diane Warren	7:22
2.	"Live For Loving You" (Live For Clubbing You Mix)	Gloria Estefan, Emilio Estefan, Jr. & Diane Warren	6:35
3.	"Live For Loving You" (Live For Dubbing You Mix)	Gloria Estefan, Emilio Estefan, Jr. & Diane Warren	4:53
4.	"Live For Loving You" (South of the Border Mix)	Gloria Estefan, Emilio Estefan, Jr. & Diane Warren	7:11
5.	"Live For Loving You" (South of the Border Percapella)	Gloria Estefan, Emilio Estefan, Jr. & Diane Warren	4:43
6.	"MSM Megamix" (Dr. Beat, Conga, Primitive Love, 1-2-3, Get On Your Feet, Rhythm Is Gonna Get You)	Enrique E. Garcia, Lawrence Dermer, Joe Galdo, Rafael Vigil, Gloria Estefan, John De Faria, Jorge Casas, Clay Ostwald	7:40

Australia Cassette Single No. 1 (657382 4) [October 1991]
No.	Title	Writer(s)	Length
1.	"Live For Loving You" (Single Remix)	Gloria Estefan, Emilio Estefan, Jr. & Diane Warren	4:19
2.	"Live For Loving You" (Album Mix)	Gloria Estefan, Emilio Estefan, Jr. & Diane Warren	4:37

Australia Cassette Single No. 2 (657382 8) [October 1991]
No.	Title	Writer(s)	Length
1.	"Live For Loving You" (Remix)	Gloria Estefan, Emilio Estefan, Jr. & Diane Warren	4:19
2.	"Live For Loving You" (Underground Club Edit)	Gloria Estefan, Emilio Estefan, Jr. & Diane Warren	4:30

Australia 12" Vinyl Single (657382 6) [October 1991]
No.	Title	Writer(s)	Length
1.	"Live For Loving You" (Underground Club Mix)	Gloria Estefan, Emilio Estefan, Jr. & Diane Warren	7:22
2.	"Live For Loving You" (Live For Clubbing You Mix)	Gloria Estefan, Emilio Estefan, Jr. & Diane Warren	6:35
3.	"Live For Loving You" (Live For Dubbing You Mix)	Gloria Estefan, Emilio Estefan, Jr. & Diane Warren	4:53
4.	"Live For Loving You" (South of the Border Mix)	Gloria Estefan, Emilio Estefan, Jr. & Diane Warren	7:11
5.	"Live For Loving You" (South of the Border Percapella)	Gloria Estefan, Emilio Estefan, Jr. & Diane Warren	4:43
6.	"MSM Megamix" (Dr. Beat, Conga, Primitive Love, 1-2-3, Get On Your Feet, Rhythm Is Gonna Get You)	Enrique E. Garcia, Lawrence Dermer, Joe Galdo, Rafael Vigil, Gloria Estefan, John De Faria, Jorge Casas, Clay Ostwald	7:40

Philippines 12" Vinyl Single (QELEP-18280)
No.	Title	Writer(s)	Length
1.	"Live For Loving You" (Underground Club Mix)	Gloria Estefan, Emilio Estefan, Jr. & Diane Warren	7:22
2.	"Live For Loving You" (Live For Clubbing You Mix)	Gloria Estefan, Emilio Estefan, Jr. & Diane Warren	6:35
3.	"Live For Loving You" (Live For Dubbing You Mix)	Gloria Estefan, Emilio Estefan, Jr. & Diane Warren	4:53
4.	"Live For Loving You" (South of the Border Mix)	Gloria Estefan, Emilio Estefan, Jr. & Diane Warren	7:11
5.	"Live For Loving You" (South of the Border Percapella)	Gloria Estefan, Emilio Estefan, Jr. & Diane Warren	4:43
6.	"MSM Megamix" (Dr. Beat, Conga, Primitive Love, 1-2-3, Get On Your Feet, Rhythm Is Gonna Get You)	Enrique E. Garcia, Lawrence Dermer, Joe Galdo, Rafael Vigil, Gloria Estefan, John De Faria, Jorge Casas, Clay Ostwald	7:40

Japan 3" CD Single (ESDA 7080) [October 25, 1991]
No.	Title	Writer(s)	Length
1.	"Live For Loving You" (Remix)	Gloria Estefan, Emilio Estefan, Jr. & Diane Warren	4:19
2.	"Live For Loving You" (Underground Club Edit)	Gloria Estefan, Emilio Estefan, Jr. & Diane Warren	4:30

== Release history ==
Country	Release date
US	September 1991
Europe	October 1991
UK	September 16, 1991
Australia	October 1991
Japan	October 25, 1991
