= Funky Sensation =

Single by Gwen McCrae

from the album Gwen McCrae
- Released: 1981
- Recorded: Atlantic Studios, New York City, 1981
- Genre: Post-disco
- Length: 4:56 (vocal); 6:32 (vocal)
- Label: Atlantic DMD-286 (US)
- Songwriter(s): Kenton Nix
- Producer(s): Kenton Nix; Henry Batts

Gwen McCrae singles chronology
"All This Love That I'm Givin'" (1979)	"Funky Sensation" (1981)	"Poyson" (1981)

"Funky Sensation" is a song released in 1981 by American singer Gwen McCrae.

The song was written by Kenton Nix who also wrote "Heartbeat" for Taana Gardner. It was produced by Nix and Henry Batts.

"Funky Sensation" peaked at number 22 on the Billboard Black Singles chart and number 15 on the Club chart.

This song is also included in her eponymous 1981 album Gwen McCrae and it was sampled by numerous artists.

== Track listing ==
=== 1982 release ===
12" vinyl

- US: Atlantic / DMD-286

Side one
No.	Title	Length
1.	"Funky Sensation" (vocal)	4:56

Side two
No.	Title	Length
1.	"Funky Sensation" (vocal)	6:35

== Personnel ==
- Arrangement, producer, songwriter: Kenton Nix
- Co-producer: Henry Batts
- Executive producers: Henry Batts, Kenton Nix, Milton A. Simpson

== Chart performance ==
Chart (1981)	Peak position
US Billboard Black Singles	22
US Billboard Hot Dance Music/Club Play	15

== Legacy ==
The track has been sampled many times:

- In 1981, old-school hip hop musician Afrika Bambaataa sampled the song for "Jazzy Sensation".
- In 1994, Sounds of Blackness sampled it in "I Believe".
- In 1995, Aswad sampled it in "One Shot Chiller".
- in 1996, Rahsaan Patterson sampled the song for "Where You Are"
- In 1996, Shyheim sampled the song for "Can You Feel It?"
- In 2000, the single was heavily sampled in the German language single "Get Up," by DJ Thomilla featuring Afrob
- In 2002, Ja Rule sampled the song for "Last Temptations"
- In 2006, Leela James sampled the song for "Good Time"
- In 2018, Disclosure heavily sampled the song for their single "Funky Sensation"
