= Remember Me with Love =

Single by Gloria Estefan

from the album Into the Light
- Released: May 27, 1991
- Recorded: 1990
- Genre: Pop
- Length: 4:37 (album version); 3:57 (single edit)
- Label: Epic
- Songwriter: Gloria Estefan
- Producers: Emilio Estefan, Jr.; Jorge Casas; Clay Ostwald

Gloria Estefan singles chronology
"Seal Our Fate" (1991)	"Remember Me with Love" (1991)	"Can't Forget You" (1991)

Music video
- "Remember Me with Love" on YouTube

"Remember Me with Love" is a song by Cuban-American singer-songwriter Gloria Estefan. It was written by Estefan, and produced by her husband, Emilio Estefan, Jr., Jorge Casas and Clay Ostwald. The song was released on May 27, 1991 by Epic Records in the United Kingdom only as the third official single from her second album, Into the Light (1991). The US saw "Can't Forget You" as the third official single from the album, whereas "Nayib’s Song (I Am Here for You)" was released in some European markets as the third official single from the aforementioned album. "Remember Me with Love" was a moderate hit in the UK, reaching the top 30 and was promoted with a music video featuring a live performance by Estefan at a concert in the Netherlands.

== Critical reception ==
In a 2021 retrospective review, Matthew Hocter from Albumism noted that "Remember Me with Love" is "a love song clearly dedicated to her husband. Stripped back, melancholic and raw, it is an extra layer of gratitude within an already grateful album. Beautiful." Bill Wyman from Entertainment Weekly wrote that the song is "distinctive", "simple, plaintive, and unpretentious." David Quantick from NME described it as "wisting".

== Track listings and formats ==
UK CD-maxi single (656968 2)
No.	Title	Writer(s)	Length
1.	"Remember Me with Love" (single edit)	Gloria Estefan	3:58
2.	"Your Love Is Bad for Me"	Gloria Estefan	3:47
3.	"The Ballad Medley: Live in Concert (Recorded at the N.E.C., Birmingham, England, April 1991)" (Anything for You, Words Get in the Way, Can't Stay Away from You, Don't Wanna Lose You)	Gloria Estefan	9:20

UK cassette single (656968 4)
No.	Title	Writer(s)	Length
1.	"Remember Me with Love" (single edit)	Gloria Estefan	3:58
2.	"Your Love Is Bad for Me"	Gloria Estefan	3:47

UK 7" vinyl single (656968 7)
No.	Title	Writer(s)	Length
1.	"Remember Me with Love" (single edit)	Gloria Estefan	3:58
2.	"Your Love Is Bad for Me"	Gloria Estefan	3:47

UK 7" vinyl single (special limited edition pull-out portrait pack) [656968 0]
No.	Title	Writer(s)	Length
1.	"Remember Me with Love" (single edit)	Gloria Estefan	3:58
2.	"Your Love Is Bad for Me"	Gloria Estefan	3:47

UK 12" vinyl single (656968 6)
No.	Title	Writer(s)	Length
1.	"Remember Me with Love" (album version)	Gloria Estefan	4:33
2.	"Your Love Is Bad for Me"	Gloria Estefan	3:47
3.	"The Ballad Medley: Live in Concert (Recorded at the N.E.C., Birmingham, England, April 1991)" (Anything for You, Words Get in the Way, Can't Stay Away from You, Don't Wanna Lose You)	Gloria Estefan	9:20

== Official versions ==
Original versions

1. Album version – 4:36
2. Single edit – 3:58

== Charts ==
Chart (1991)	Peak position
Europe (European Hot 100 Singles)	64
Ireland (IRMA)	15
UK Singles (OCC)	22
UK Airplay (Music Week)	4
