= Explicit Lyrics =

Studio album by Ophélie Winter
- Released: 5 November 2002
- Genre: French pop, R&B
- Label: Warner Music France
- Producer: Wayne "Tatz" Beckford, Sébastien Storch, Luca Minchillo, Sulee B. Wax, Ophélie Winter

Ophélie Winter chronology
Privacy (1998)	Explicit Lyrics (2002)	Résurrection (2009)

Explicit Lyrics is the third studio album recorded by the French artist Ophélie Winter.

== Track listing ==
1. "Sache in Progress" (Interlude) (Ophélie Winter, Wayne Beckford)
2. "Sache" (Ophélie Winter, Wayne Beckford)
3. "Yeah, Yeah, Yeah" (Ophélie Winter, Doudou Masta, Wayne Beckford)
4. "Party Now" feat. Wayne "Tatz" Beckford (Ophélie Winter - Wayne Beckford)
5. "Definition" (Interlude) (Ophélie Winter, Wayne Beckford)
6. "Tout le monde le fait" (Ophélie Winter, Wayne Beckford)
7. "Appelle moi, Pt. 1 (Interlude)" feat. Sulee B. Wax (Wallen, Sulee B. Wax)
8. "Double Vie" (Wallen, Sulee B. Wax)
9. "Viens" (Ophélie Winter, Benjamin Deffe, Wayne Beckford)
10. "Vendetta" (Pascale Hospital, Wayne Beckford)
11. "Bonnie Parker" (Ophélie Winter, Wayne Beckford)
12. "Ouvre" (Ophélie Winter, Noam Kaniel, Wayne Beckford)
13. "Quand les larmes" (Ophélie Winter, Guy Waku, Wayne Beckford)
14. "Wrap" (Interlude) (Ophélie Winter, Wayne Beckford)
15. "Something" (Bonus track) (Misty Oldland, Nicolas Neidhardt)

== Charts ==
Chart (2002)	Peak position
French Albums (SNEP)	36
Swiss Albums (Schweizer Hitparade)	96
