= My First Time Around =

Studio album by Betty Wright
- Released: 1968
- Genre: R&B, soul
- Label: Atco
- Producer: Brad Shapiro, Steve Alaimo

Betty Wright chronology
My First Time Around (1968)	I Love The Way You Love (1972)

Singles from My First Time Around
- 1. "Girls Can't Do What the Guys Do" Released: June 26, 1968; 2. "He's Bad, Bad, Bad" Released: October 11, 1968; 3. "The Best Girls Don't Always Win" Released: December 3, 1968

My First Time Around is the 1968 debut LP by Betty Wright. The album was recorded when Wright was 14 years old. It includes the Top 40 hit single "Girls Can't Do What the Guys Do".

== Track listing ==
Side one
No.	Title	Writer(s)	Length
1.	"Girls Can't Do What the Guys Do"	Clarence Reid, Willie Clarke	2:04
2.	"Funny How Love Grows Cold"	Clarence Reid, Willie Clarke	2:51
3.	"I'm Gonna Hate Myself in the Morning"	Dale Ward, Arthur Alexander	2:11
4.	"Circle of Heartbreak"	Betty Wright	2:58
5.	"Sweet Lovin' Daddy"	Clarence Reid, Willie Clarke	2:25
6.	"Cry Like a Baby"	Dan Penn, Spooner Oldham	2:34

Side two
No.	Title	Writer(s)	Length
1.	"Watch Out Love"	Brad Shapiro, Betty Wright, Willie Clarke	2:41
2.	"He's Bad, Bad, Bad"	Clarence Reid, Willie Clarke	2:22
3.	"I Can't Stop My Heart"	Jackie Avery	3:24
4.	"I'm Thankful"	Steve Alaimo, Sam Cooke, J. W. Alexander	2:03
5.	"The Best Girls Don't Always Win"	Clarence Reid	3:08
6.	"Just You"	Sonny Bono	3:06

== Personnel ==
- Betty Wright – lead vocals
- Joey Murcia – guitar
- Bobby Birdwatcher – piano, organ
- Clarence Reid – piano
- Arnold Albury – piano
- David Brown – bass
- Eddie Martinez – drums
- Butch Trucks – drums
- The Reid Singers – backing vocals

== Critical reception ==
Professional ratings
Review scores
Source	Rating
Allmusic	3/5 stars
