= Coming Out of the Dark =

1991 single by Gloria Estefan

Single by Gloria Estefan

from the album Into the Light
- B-side: "Desde La Oscuridad"
- Released: January 10, 1991
- Recorded: 1990
- Studio: Crescent Moon, Miami, Florida
- Genre: Ballad; gospel; soul
- Length: 4:02
- Label: Epic
- Songwriters: Gloria Estefan; Emilio Estefan Jr.; Jon Secada
- Producers: Emilio Estefan Jr.; Jorge Casas; Clay Ostwald

Gloria Estefan singles chronology
| "Renacer" (1990) | "Coming Out of the Dark" (1991) | "Seal Our Fate" (1991) |

Music video
- "Coming Out of the Dark" on YouTube

"Coming Out of the Dark" is a song by Cuban-American singer and songwriter Gloria Estefan. It was released on January 10, 1991, worldwide by Epic Records as the leading and first single from her second album, Into the Light (1991). It was written by Estefan with her husband Emilio Estefan, Jr. and Jon Secada, and produced by Estefan Jr., Jorge Casas and Clay Ostwald. It became the singer's third number one in the United States and second number one in Canada (solo and with Miami Sound Machine). The song is a soul ballad which includes the use of a choir. Among the voices in the choir are Estefan's colleague, the Cuban singer Jon Secada, and the R&B singer Betty Wright (both had participated in backing vocals on her debut solo album, Cuts Both Ways as well as Into the Light). The song's accompanying music video received heavy rotation on MTV Europe in March 1991.

This is the first single released after Estefan's accident on March 20, 1990—an 18-wheeler rammed her tour bus, nearly causing the singer's death—when her "Get on Your Feet Tour" was in progress. It is also the first song that Estefan performed publicly after recovering, inspired by the near-fatal accident and also is dedicated to her husband. The title was inspired by a phrase her husband had written on a piece of paper as a helicopter transported her for delicate surgery to repair her broken back. She explained to Billboard: "My husband had been in one of the helicopters traveling from one hospital to the other. It was really dark and gray, and he was traumatized. He got this ray of light that hit him in the face, and he got the idea for 'Coming Out of the Dark'."

Estefan was careful not to turn Into the Light into a pity party. "I hate pity," she told the Los Angeles Daily News. "I'm very self-reliant and independent, and I'm used to that role. I don't like people feeling sorry for me. So I wrote 'Coming Out of the Dark' to let the people around me know how important they are to me. But that was as far as I wanted to go with the accident. I didn't want this to become 'the album on the accident.' What am I going to sing - 'Oh, this bus hit me'?"

== Chart performance ==
The song was a number one hit on the US Billboard Hot 100, US Cash Box Top 100 and Adult Contemporary charts. The song was also a hit in Canada, Spain and Japan, while having moderate success in the rest of Europe, where Estefan had always been popular. In Ireland, the single reached the top 20, and in the UK it reached the top 40.

== Critical reception ==
AllMusic editor Jason Birchmeier highlighted the song in his review of Into the Light, complimenting it as a "memorable" ballad. Upon the release, Larry Flick from Billboard magazine found that this "uplifting, gospel-framed ballad" is "bolstered by a striking and inspirational performance." Bill Wyman from Entertainment Weekly wrote that "Coming Out of the Dark" is a "pretty song about Estefan's recovery. It starts out slow, then brings its point home with a gospel-like chorus reminiscent of Michael Jackson's 'Man in the Mirror'. It's hard not to be sympathetic — the song is an anthem to hope and indomitability, and someone who's endured Estefan's pain certainly deserves room to talk about it." Mario Tarradell from Knight Ridder named it a "gospel-tinged showpiece". Pan-European magazine Music & Media remarked that with a "comeback in glory after a heavy tourbus accident, Estefan shines in this gospel type of song. Inspired by the strong backing vocals, she climbs her way back to the top. David Quantick from NME said, "Her recent stuff, the 'Anything for You's and 'Oye Mi Canto's threaten to give American hit music a good name. 'Coming Out of the Dark', however, is a bit epic for my tastes, Gloria's restrained vocal not ideally suited to its anthemic leanings. Perhaps Maria McKee could cover it?" Parry Gettelman from Orlando Sentinel wrote that the song "has a pretty vocal although the melody sounds like something destined for a Kodak commercial. The gospel-choir effect of the backing vocals seems more an homage to Madonna's 'Like a Prayer' than a spiritual statement." People Magazine deemed it as "standard dance pop". Caroline Sullivan from Smash Hits felt it "starts off slow, then perks up a touch and cracks along at a lively pace for the rest of the song."

== Retrospective response ==
In 2019, Bill Lamb from About.com described the song as a "gorgeous hit ballad", adding that it is now considered one of the top inspirational pop hits of all time. In a 2021 retrospective review, Matthew Hocter from Albumism named it "one of her finest". Maryann Scheufele from AXS ranked the song among her ten "best songs" in 2014, remarking that Estefan "truly has been blessed with an inspirational voice." The Daily Vault's Mark Millan named it one of three "real hits" of the album, with "Live for Loving You" and "Seal Our Fate". Pip Ellwood-Hughes from Entertainment Focus declared it as "one of the most poignant songs" of Estefan's career. Leah Greenblatt from Entertainment Weekly described it as a "poignant gospel-tinged ballad".

== Spanish version ("Desde La Oscuridad") ==
Estefan also recorded the Spanish version of the song, called "Desde la Oscuridad". The song was released to Latin-American radio stations and the considerable airplay it received took the song to the Top Five of the Hot Latin Songs chart.

== Track listings ==
US & Canada Cassette Single (34T 73666) [January 22, 1991]
| No. | Title | Writer(s) | Length |
|---|---|---|---|
| 1. | "Coming Out Of The Dark" | Gloria Estefan, Emilio Estefan, Jr. & Jon Secada | 4:02 |
| 2. | "Desde La Oscuridad" (Coming Out Of The Dark - Spanish Version) | Gloria Estefan, Emilio Estefan, Jr. & Jon Secada | 4:07 |

US & Canada 7-inch Vinyl Single (34 73666) [January 22, 1991]
| No. | Title | Writer(s) | Length |
|---|---|---|---|
| 1. | "Coming Out Of The Dark" | Gloria Estefan, Emilio Estefan, Jr. & Jon Secada | 4:02 |
| 2. | "Desde La Oscuridad" (Coming Out Of The Dark - Spanish Version) | Gloria Estefan, Emilio Estefan, Jr. & Jon Secada | 4:07 |

Europe 3-inch CD Single (656574 1) [January 1991]
| No. | Title | Writer(s) | Length |
|---|---|---|---|
| 1. | "Coming Out Of The Dark" | Gloria Estefan, Emilio Estefan, Jr. & Jon Secada | 4:02 |
| 2. | "Desde La Oscuridad" (Coming Out Of The Dark - Spanish Version) | Gloria Estefan, Emilio Estefan, Jr. & Jon Secada | 4:07 |

Europe CD-Maxi Single (656574 5) [January 1991]
| No. | Title | Writer(s) | Length |
|---|---|---|---|
| 1. | "Coming Out Of The Dark" | Gloria Estefan, Emilio Estefan, Jr. & Jon Secada | 4:02 |
| 2. | "Desde La Oscuridad" (Coming Out Of The Dark - Spanish Version) | Gloria Estefan, Emilio Estefan, Jr. & Jon Secada | 4:07 |
| 3. | "Coming Out Of The Dark" (Instrumental Version) | Gloria Estefan, Emilio Estefan, Jr. & Jon Secada | 4:41 |

Europe 7-inch Vinyl Single (656574 7) [January 1991]
| No. | Title | Writer(s) | Length |
|---|---|---|---|
| 1. | "Coming Out Of The Dark" | Gloria Estefan, Emilio Estefan, Jr. & Jon Secada | 4:02 |
| 2. | "Desde La Oscuridad" (Coming Out Of The Dark - Spanish Version) | Gloria Estefan, Emilio Estefan, Jr. & Jon Secada | 4:07 |

Europe 12-inch Vinyl Single (656574 6) [January 1991]
| No. | Title | Writer(s) | Length |
|---|---|---|---|
| 1. | "Coming Out Of The Dark" | Gloria Estefan, Emilio Estefan, Jr. & Jon Secada | 4:02 |
| 2. | "Desde La Oscuridad" (Coming Out Of The Dark - Spanish Version) | Gloria Estefan, Emilio Estefan, Jr. & Jon Secada | 4:07 |
| 3. | "Coming Out Of The Dark" (Instrumental Version) | Gloria Estefan, Emilio Estefan, Jr. & Jon Secada | 4:41 |

Dutch 7-inch Vinyl Single (656574 9) [January 1991]
| No. | Title | Writer(s) | Length |
|---|---|---|---|
| 1. | "Coming Out Of The Dark" | Gloria Estefan, Emilio Estefan, Jr. & Jon Secada | 4:02 |
| 2. | "Coming Out Of The Dark" (Instrumental Version) | Gloria Estefan, Emilio Estefan, Jr. & Jon Secada | 4:41 |

France Cassette Single (656574 4) [January 1991]
| No. | Title | Writer(s) | Length |
|---|---|---|---|
| 1. | "Coming Out Of The Dark" | Gloria Estefan, Emilio Estefan, Jr. & Jon Secada | 4:02 |
| 2. | "Desde La Oscuridad" (Coming Out Of The Dark - Spanish Version) | Gloria Estefan, Emilio Estefan, Jr. & Jon Secada | 4:07 |

France 7-inch Vinyl Single (656574 7) [January 1991]
| No. | Title | Writer(s) | Length |
|---|---|---|---|
| 1. | "Coming Out Of The Dark" | Gloria Estefan, Emilio Estefan, Jr. & Jon Secada | 4:02 |
| 2. | "Desde La Oscuridad" (Coming Out Of The Dark - Spanish Version) | Gloria Estefan, Emilio Estefan, Jr. & Jon Secada | 4:07 |

France 12-inch Vinyl Single (656574 6) [January 1991]
| No. | Title | Writer(s) | Length |
|---|---|---|---|
| 1. | "Coming Out Of The Dark" | Gloria Estefan, Emilio Estefan, Jr. & Jon Secada | 4:02 |
| 2. | "Desde La Oscuridad" (Coming Out Of The Dark - Spanish Version) | Gloria Estefan, Emilio Estefan, Jr. & Jon Secada | 4:07 |
| 3. | "Coming Out Of The Dark" (Instrumental Version) | Gloria Estefan, Emilio Estefan, Jr. & Jon Secada | 4:41 |

UK CD-Maxi Single (656574 2) [January 21, 1991]
| No. | Title | Writer(s) | Length |
|---|---|---|---|
| 1. | "Coming Out Of The Dark" | Gloria Estefan, Emilio Estefan, Jr. & Jon Secada | 4:02 |
| 2. | "Desde La Oscuridad" (Coming Out Of The Dark - Spanish Version) | Gloria Estefan, Emilio Estefan, Jr. & Jon Secada | 4:07 |
| 3. | "Coming Out Of The Dark" (Instrumental Version) | Gloria Estefan, Emilio Estefan, Jr. & Jon Secada | 4:41 |
| 4. | "Don't Let The Sun Go Down On Me" | Elton John & Bernie Taupin | 6:11 |

UK Cassette Single (656574 4) [January 21, 1991]
| No. | Title | Writer(s) | Length |
|---|---|---|---|
| 1. | "Coming Out Of The Dark" | Gloria Estefan, Emilio Estefan, Jr. & Jon Secada | 4:02 |
| 2. | "Desde La Oscuridad" (Coming Out Of The Dark - Spanish Version) | Gloria Estefan, Emilio Estefan, Jr. & Jon Secada | 4:07 |

UK 7-inch Vinyl Single (656574 7) [January 21, 1991]
| No. | Title | Writer(s) | Length |
|---|---|---|---|
| 1. | "Coming Out Of The Dark" | Gloria Estefan, Emilio Estefan, Jr. & Jon Secada | 4:02 |
| 2. | "Desde La Oscuridad" (Coming Out Of The Dark - Spanish Version) | Gloria Estefan, Emilio Estefan, Jr. & Jon Secada | 4:07 |

UK 7-inch Vinyl Single (Limited Edition Frame Pack) [656574 0] {January 21, 1991}
| No. | Title | Writer(s) | Length |
|---|---|---|---|
| 1. | "Coming Out Of The Dark" | Gloria Estefan, Emilio Estefan, Jr. & Jon Secada | 4:02 |
| 2. | "Desde La Oscuridad" (Coming Out Of The Dark - Spanish Version) | Gloria Estefan, Emilio Estefan, Jr. & Jon Secada | 4:07 |

UK 12-inch Vinyl Single (656574 8) [January 21, 1991]
| No. | Title | Writer(s) | Length |
|---|---|---|---|
| 1. | "Coming Out Of The Dark" | Gloria Estefan, Emilio Estefan, Jr. & Jon Secada | 4:02 |
| 2. | "Desde La Oscuridad" (Coming Out Of The Dark - Spanish Version) | Gloria Estefan, Emilio Estefan, Jr. & Jon Secada | 4:07 |
| 3. | "Coming Out Of The Dark" (Instrumental Version) | Gloria Estefan, Emilio Estefan, Jr. & Jon Secada | 4:41 |
| 4. | "Don't Let The Sun Go Down On Me" | Elton John & Bernie Taupin | 6:11 |

Mexico 7-inch Vinyl Single (50-01-9268)
| No. | Title | Writer(s) | Length |
|---|---|---|---|
| 1. | "Coming Out Of The Dark" | Gloria Estefan, Emilio Estefan, Jr. & Jon Secada | 4:02 |
| 2. | "Desde La Oscuridad" (Coming Out Of The Dark - Spanish Version) | Gloria Estefan, Emilio Estefan, Jr. & Jon Secada | 4:07 |

Australia CD Single (656574 2) [January 1991]
| No. | Title | Writer(s) | Length |
|---|---|---|---|
| 1. | "Coming Out Of The Dark" | Gloria Estefan, Emilio Estefan, Jr. & Jon Secada | 4:02 |
| 2. | "Desde La Oscuridad" (Coming Out Of The Dark - Spanish Version) | Gloria Estefan, Emilio Estefan, Jr. & Jon Secada | 4:07 |

Australia Cassette Single (656574 4) [January 1991]
| No. | Title | Writer(s) | Length |
|---|---|---|---|
| 1. | "Coming Out Of The Dark" | Gloria Estefan, Emilio Estefan, Jr. & Jon Secada | 4:02 |
| 2. | "Desde La Oscuridad" (Coming Out Of The Dark - Spanish Version) | Gloria Estefan, Emilio Estefan, Jr. & Jon Secada | 4:07 |

Australia 7-inch Vinyl Single (656574 7) [January 1991]
| No. | Title | Writer(s) | Length |
|---|---|---|---|
| 1. | "Coming Out Of The Dark" | Gloria Estefan, Emilio Estefan, Jr. & Jon Secada | 4:02 |
| 2. | "Desde La Oscuridad" (Coming Out Of The Dark - Spanish Version) | Gloria Estefan, Emilio Estefan, Jr. & Jon Secada | 4:07 |

Philippines 7-inch Vinyl Single (QEL45-20214) [January 1991]
| No. | Title | Writer(s) | Length |
|---|---|---|---|
| 1. | "Coming Out Of The Dark" | Gloria Estefan, Emilio Estefan, Jr. & Jon Secada | 4:02 |
| 2. | "Desde La Oscuridad" (Coming Out Of The Dark - Spanish Version) | Gloria Estefan, Emilio Estefan, Jr. & Jon Secada | 4:07 |

Japan 3-inch CD-Maxi Single (ESDA 7060) [January 24, 1991]
| No. | Title | Writer(s) | Length |
|---|---|---|---|
| 1. | "Coming Out Of The Dark" | Gloria Estefan, Emilio Estefan, Jr. & Jon Secada | 4:02 |
| 2. | "Desde La Oscuridad" (Coming Out Of The Dark - Spanish Version) | Gloria Estefan, Emilio Estefan, Jr. & Jon Secada | 4:07 |
| 3. | "Coming Out Of The Dark" (Instrumental Version) | Gloria Estefan, Emilio Estefan, Jr. & Jon Secada | 4:41 |

== Charts ==
=== Weekly charts ===
| Chart (1991) | Peak position |
|---|---|
| Australia (ARIA) | 56 |
| Belgium (Ultratop 50 Flanders) | 24 |
| Canada Top Singles (RPM) | 1 |
| Canada Adult Contemporary (RPM) | 1 |
| Europe (Eurochart Hot 100) | 43 |
| Europe (European Hit Radio) | 4 |
| Finland (Suomen virallinen lista) | 17 |
| Germany (GfK) | 45 |
| Ireland (IRMA) | 16 |
| Israel (Israeli Singles Chart) | 19 |
| Luxembourg (Radio Luxembourg) | 16 |
| Netherlands (Dutch Top 40) | 15 |
| Netherlands (Single Top 100) | 11 |
| New Zealand (Recorded Music NZ) | 26 |
| Switzerland (Schweizer Hitparade) | 28 |
| UK Singles (Official Charts) | 25 |
| UK Airplay (Music Week) | 4 |
| US Billboard Hot 100 | 1 |
| US Adult Contemporary (Billboard) | 1 |
| US Hot Latin Songs (Billboard) | 4 |
| US Hot R&B/Hip-Hop Songs (Billboard) | 60 |
| US Cash Box Top 100 | 1 |

=== Year-end charts ===
| Chart (1991) | Position |
|---|---|
| Canada Top Singles (RPM) | 17 |
| Canada Adult Contemporary (RPM) | 6 |
| Europe (European Hit Radio) | 39 |
| US Billboard Hot 100 | 34 |
| US Adult Contemporary (Billboard) | 8 |
| US Cash Box Top 100 | 9 |
