= Dieu m'a donné la foi =

1995 single by Ophélie Winter

Single by Ophélie Winter

from the album No Soucy !
- Language: French
- English title: "God Gave Me Faith"
- B-side: "Everlasting Love"
- Released: 29 September 1995
- Length: 3:55
- Label: EastWest
- Songwriters: D. Godsend, N. Hardt, B. Godsend, P. Jerry
- Producers: Fred Fraikin, Guy Waku

Ophélie Winter singles chronology
"Dad" / "Pour une lady" (1994)	"Dieu m'a donné la foi" (1995)	"Le feu qui m'attise" (1996)

"Dieu m'a donné la foi" (English: "God Gave Me Faith") is a song by French singer Ophélie Winter. It was released as the lead single from her debut album, No Soucy !, in September 1995. It achieved success in France, where it topped the chart, and in Belgium's Wallonia region, where it peaked at number three, and remains Winter's biggest success. The song has groove sonorities and is influenced by the negro spiritual, and as the title suggests it, the lyrics deals with spirituality. The song was used in 1997 French film Bouge!, in which Winter portrays a singer, and performs the song in English-language under the title "Living in Me". This version was included on the English version of her album Soon.

== Commercial performance ==
In France, "Dieu m'a donné la foi" debuted at number 49 on 18 November 1995 and reached the top 10 six weeks later. It eventually topped the French Singles Chart for a sole week, totalling 15 weeks in the top 10 and 32 weeks in the top 50. It was certified gold by the Syndicat National de l'Édition Phonographique (SNEP). In the Wallonia region of Belgium, the single charted for 27 weeks and spent 16 weeks in the top 10, four of them at its peak of number three.

== Track listings ==
- CD single
1. "Dieu m'a donné la foi" — 3:55
2. "Everlasting Love" — 5:05

== Charts ==
=== Weekly charts ===
Chart (1995–1996)	Peak position
Belgium (Ultratop 50 Wallonia)	3
Europe (Eurochart Hot 100)	11
France (SNEP)	1

=== Year-end charts ===
Chart (1995)	Position
France (SNEP)	81

Chart (1996)	Position
Belgium (Ultratop 50 Wallonia)	9
Europe (Eurochart Hot 100)	38
France (SNEP)	16

== Certifications ==
Region	Certification	Certified units/sales
France (SNEP)	Gold	250,000^{*}
^{*} Sales figures based on certification alone.
