= Seal Our Fate =

"Seal our Fate"

Single by Gloria Estefan

from the album Into the Light
- Released: March 25, 1991
- Recorded: 1990
- Genre: Pop rock; dance-rock
- Length: 3:55 (edit); 4:23 (album version)
- Label: Epic
- Songwriter: Gloria Estefan
- Producers: Emilio Estefan; Jorge Casas; Clay Ostwald

Gloria Estefan singles chronology
"Coming Out of the Dark" (1991)	"Seal our Fate" (1991)	"Remember Me with Love" (1991)

Music video
- "Seal Our Fate" on YouTube

"Seal Our Fate" is a song by Cuban-American singer and songwriter Gloria Estefan, taken from her second solo album, Into the Light (1991). The song was written by Estefan, and produced by her husband Emilio Estefan, Jr., Clay Ostwald, and Jorge Casas. It was released as the album's second single by Epic Records on March 25, 1991. The 7-inch vinyl single in the UK was released as a "Limited Edition Tour Souvenir Pack" and the Latin American promo-single was released with the name of "Sella Nuestro Destino" that means the same in English, but the song was not in a Spanish version. Some remixes were made for the song, some of which were produced by John Hagg and Eric Schilling.

== Critical reception ==
Matthew Hocter from Albumism chose "Seal Our Fate" as one of three singles, that "truly stand out" of the album. Larry Flick from Billboard magazine described it as an "upbeat, philosophical pop/rocker", noting further that Estefan "works up a respectable sweat amid an aggressive, guitar-driven arrangement." The Daily Vault's Mark Millan called it a "so-so pop-rocker" and named the song one of three "real hits" of the album, with "Live for Loving You" and "Coming Out of the Dark". Mario Tarradell from Knight Ridder felt the song is "a product of the accident", adding that Estefan "delivers her message — prepare for tomorrow because you never know what will happen next — with strong lyrics and a hard rock beat." David Quantick from NME complimented it as "absurdly catchy". People Magazine described it as "slightly funky".

== Music video ==
Gloria Estefan on a still in the music video

A music video for the song was released, and is one of Gloria's most choreographed ever videos, similar to the choreography made by Paula Abdul on her music-video "Cold Hearted." It became a hit since fans and followers of Estefan saw her recovered from her near-fatal accident. In the video she dances and follows a choreography for the song with the other dancers.

== Pepsi commercial ==
The song which was a moderate-hit was used for a 1991 Pepsi commercial that featured Estefan. The clip shows a student listening to (presumably) his teacher (Estefan), but then he drinks a Pepsi soda and turns on his walkman, which leads to his teacher turning into a rock star singing this song and the scenario being changed from the school to a concert stage where the singer is dancing and singing. The student then realizes he is only dreaming and pays attention back to the teacher, who at the end shuts an eye to the camera and the commercial ends with a Pepsi slogan.

== Track listings ==
US & Canada Cassette Single (34T 73769) [April 1991]
No.	Title	Writer(s)	Length
1.	"Seal Our Fate" (Edit)	Gloria Estefan	3:55
2.	"Seal Our Fate" (Album Version)	Gloria Estefan	4:23

US & Canada 7" Vinyl Single (34 73769) [April 1991]
No.	Title	Writer(s)	Length
1.	"Seal Our Fate" (Edit)	Gloria Estefan	3:55
2.	"Seal Our Fate" (Album Version)	Gloria Estefan	4:23

US Promo CD Single (ESK 73769) [April 1991]
No.	Title	Writer(s)	Length
1.	"Seal Our Fate" (Edit)	Gloria Estefan	3:55

Europe 3" CD Single (EPC 656773 1) [April 1991]
No.	Title	Writer(s)	Length
1.	"Seal Our Fate"	Gloria Estefan	4:23
2.	"Seal Our Fate" (Remix Edit)	Gloria Estefan	4:13

Europe CD-Maxi Single (EPC 656773 2) [April 1991]
No.	Title	Writer(s)	Length
1.	"Seal Our Fate"	Gloria Estefan	4:23
2.	"Seal Our Fate" (Extended Remix)	Gloria Estefan	6:09
3.	"Seal Our Fate" (Dub)	Gloria Estefan	5:33

Europe 7" Vinyl Single (EPC 656773 7) [April 1991]
No.	Title	Writer(s)	Length
1.	"Seal Our Fate"	Gloria Estefan	4:23
2.	"Seal Our Fate" (Remix Edit)	Gloria Estefan	4:13

Europe 12" Vinyl Single (EPC 656773 6) [April 1991]
No.	Title	Writer(s)	Length
1.	"Seal Our Fate" (Extended Remix)	Gloria Estefan	6:09
2.	"Seal Our Fate" (Dub)	Gloria Estefan	5:33
3.	"Seal Our Fate"	Gloria Estefan	4:23

Spain Promo 7" Vinyl Single (ARIE 0010) [April 1991]
No.	Title	Writer(s)	Length
1.	"Seal Our Fate"	Gloria Estefan	4:23

UK CD-Maxi Single (656773 2) [March 1991]
No.	Title	Writer(s)	Length
1.	"Seal Our Fate"	Gloria Estefan	4:23
2.	"Seal Our Fate" (Extended Remix)	Gloria Estefan	6:09
3.	"Seal Our Fate" (Dub)	Gloria Estefan	5:33

UK Cassette Single (656773 4) [March 1991]
No.	Title	Writer(s)	Length
1.	"Seal Our Fate"	Gloria Estefan	4:23
2.	"Seal Our Fate" (Remix Edit)	Gloria Estefan	4:13

UK 7" Vinyl Single (656773 7) [March 1991]
No.	Title	Writer(s)	Length
1.	"Seal Our Fate"	Gloria Estefan	4:23
2.	"Seal Our Fate" (Remix Edit)	Gloria Estefan	4:13

UK 7" Vinyl Single (Limited Edition Tour Souvenir Pack) [656773 0] {March 1991}
No.	Title	Writer(s)	Length
1.	"Seal Our Fate"	Gloria Estefan	4:23
2.	"Seal Our Fate" (Remix Edit)	Gloria Estefan	4:13

UK 12" Vinyl Single (656773 6) [March 1991]
No.	Title	Writer(s)	Length
1.	"Seal Our Fate" (Extended Remix)	Gloria Estefan	6:09
2.	"Seal Our Fate" (Dub)	Gloria Estefan	5:33
3.	"Seal Our Fate"	Gloria Estefan	4:23

Costa Rica Promo 7" Vinyl Single (7119191)
No.	Title	Writer(s)	Length
1.	"Seal Our Fate"	Gloria Estefan	4:23

Mexico Promo 12" Vinyl Single (PRLP 95420)
No.	Title	Writer(s)	Length
1.	"Seal Our Fate"	Gloria Estefan	4:23
2.	"Seal Our Fate"	Gloria Estefan	4:23

Australia CD-Maxi Single (656773 2) [April 1991]
No.	Title	Writer(s)	Length
1.	"Seal Our Fate"	Gloria Estefan	4:23
2.	"Seal Our Fate" (Extended Remix)	Gloria Estefan	6:09
3.	"Seal Our Fate" (Dub)	Gloria Estefan	5:33

Australia Cassette Single (656773 4) [April 1991]
No.	Title	Writer(s)	Length
1.	"Seal Our Fate"	Gloria Estefan	4:23
2.	"Seal Our Fate" (Remix Edit)	Gloria Estefan	4:13

Australia 7" Vinyl Single (656773 7) [April 1991]
No.	Title	Writer(s)	Length
1.	"Seal Our Fate"	Gloria Estefan	4:23
2.	"Seal Our Fate" (Remix Edit)	Gloria Estefan	4:13

Australia 12" Vinyl Single (656773 6) [April 1991]
No.	Title	Writer(s)	Length
1.	"Seal Our Fate" (Extended Remix)	Gloria Estefan	6:09
2.	"Seal Our Fate" (Dub)	Gloria Estefan	5:33
3.	"Seal Our Fate"	Gloria Estefan	4:23

Philippines 7" Vinyl Single (QEL45-20218)
No.	Title	Writer(s)	Length
1.	"Seal Our Fate"	Gloria Estefan	4:23
2.	"No Te Olvidaré" (Anything For You - Spanish Version)	Gloria Estefan	4:04

Japan 3" CD-Maxi Single (ESDA 7066) [April 11, 1991]
No.	Title	Writer(s)	Length
1.	"Seal Our Fate"	Gloria Estefan	4:24
2.	"Seal Our Fate" (Extended Remix)	Gloria Estefan	6:09
3.	"Seal Our Fate" (Dub)	Gloria Estefan	5:34

== Official versions ==
Original versions

1. Album version – 4:25
2. Edit – 3:55

Remixes

1. Extended remix – 6:09
2. Remix edit – 4:13
3. Dub – 5:33

== Charts ==
=== Weekly charts ===
Chart (1991)	Peak position
Belgium (Ultratop Flanders)	35
Belgium (Ultratop Wallonia)	20
Europe (Eurochart Hot 100)	79
Europe (European Hit Radio)	9
Germany (Official German Charts)	54
Netherlands (Dutch Top 40 Tipparade)	10
Netherlands (Single Top 100)	46
Poland (Polish Singles Chart)	47
UK Singles (OCC)	24
UK Airplay (Music Week)	2
US Billboard Hot 100	53
US Cash Box Top 100	40

=== Year-end charts ===
Chart (1991)	Position
Europe (European Hit Radio)	70

== Release history ==
Region	Date
United States	April 16, 1991
United Kingdom	March 1991
Europe	April 4, 1991
Japan	April 11, 1991
Australia	April 23, 1991
