= Rockin' Chair (Gwen McCrae song) =

Single by Gwen McCrae
- B-side: "It Keeps on Raining"
- Released: May 1975
- Genre: Soul; disco
- Length: 3:15
- Label: TK
- Composer: Willie Clarke/Clarence Reid

Gwen McCrae singles chronology
| "Love Insurance" (1975) | "Rockin' Chair" (1975) | "Let's Dance, Dance, Dance" (1975) |

Rockin' Chair is a hit 1975 song by singer Gwen McCrae. The song is not to be confused with either Fats Domino's 1951 R&B hit of the same name or the 1929 "Rockin' Chair" by Hoagy Carmichael.

== Use as answer song ==
Gwen's husband, George McCrae, had a number-one hit single the year earlier, "Rock Your Baby." "Rockin' Chair" was intended to be an answer song to George's hit. The songs were released just less than a year apart. George provided backing vocals on the song.

== Chart history ==
"Rockin' Chair" was McCrae's sole entry into the US top 10 on both the pop and soul charts. The single hit number nine on the US pop charts, and hit number one on the US soul chart for one week. In Canada, "Rockin' Chair" spent two weeks at number 23.

=== Weekly charts ===
| Chart (1975) | Peak position |
|---|---|
| Canada RPM Top Singles | 23 |
| New Zealand (RIANZ) | 37 |
| U.S. Billboard Hot 100 | 9 |
| U.S. Billboard R&B | 1 |
| U.S. Cash Box Top 100 | 10 |

=== Year-end charts ===
| Chart (1975) | Rank |
|---|---|
| Canada | 174 |
| U.S. Cash Box | 96 |
