= Can't Forget You (Gloria Estefan song) =

Single by Gloria Estefan

from the album Into the Light
- Released: June 1991
- Recorded: 1990
- Genre: Pop
- Length: 4:15
- Label: Epic
- Songwriters: Jorge Casas; Clay Ostwald; Jon Secada

Gloria Estefan singles chronology
"Remember Me with Love" (1991)	"Can't Forget You" (1991)	"Live for Loving You" (1991)

Music video
- "Can't Forget You" on YouTube

"Can't Forget You" is a song by Cuban-American singer-songwriter Gloria Estefan, released in June 1991 by Epic as the third single from her second solo album, Into the Light (1991), and at the same time as "Remember Me with Love" in the UK. Written by Jorge Casas, Clay Ostwald and Jon Secada, the single covered almost all the other countries where Estefan released the album, including Australia, Japan, Philippines, Spain, Canada and the United States. "Nayib’s Song (I Am Here for You)" was also released in some European markets as the third official single from the album. The song is much in the style of her earlier songs like "Can't Stay Away from You" or "Don't Wanna Lose You". It peaked at number 43 on the US Billboard Hot 100, but reached number two on the Billboard Adult Contemporary chart. No remixes were created for this song. In the UK, "Can't Forget You" was included as a B-side on the single "Go Away", released in 1993.

== Critical reception ==
David Quantick from NME wrote, "Ballads like "Can't Forget You" are echoes of previous Estefan ballads. The Latin element is highly subdued."

== Charts ==
Chart (1991)	Peak position
Australia (ARIA)	99
Canada Top Singles (RPM)	61
Canada Adult Contemporary (RPM)	6
US Billboard Hot 100	43
US Adult Contemporary (Billboard)	2
US Cashbox Top 100	35

== Release history ==
Region	Date
US	June 1991
Japan	July 25, 1991
Australia	July 1991
