= No Soucy ! =

Studio album by Ophélie Winter
- Released: 22 May 1996
- Recorded: 1995–1996
- Genre: R&B
- Length: 55:55
- Label: Warner / East West
- Producer: A.Nakache, M.Nakache, Nicolas Neidhardt, Fred Fraikin, Guy Waku, J.Harry, SoulShock & Karlin, Bambi Cruz, Siedah Garrett

Ophélie Winter chronology
No Soucy ! (1996)	Privacy (1998)

Singles from No Soucy !
- 1. "Dieu m'a donne la foi" Released: November 18, 1995; 2. "Le Feu Qui M'attise" Released: May 8, 1996; 3. "Shame On U" Released: October 12, 1996; 4. "Keep It On The Red Light" Released: March 15, 1997; 5. "Rien que pour lui" Released: June 28, 1997

No Soucy ! is the first studio album of French singer Ophélie Winter released in 1996. It provided five singles, including three top ten hits in France: her signature song "Dieu m'a donné la foi" which reached number one, "Le Feu qui m'attise" (number seven), "Shame on U" (number nine), a duet with Coolio "Keep It On The Red Light" (number 19) and "Rien que pour lui" (number 39). The album itself was successful, reaching number six in France.

== Track listing ==
1. "Soon" (Garrett, Karlin, SoulShock) — 4:18
2. "le Feu qui m'attise" (J.Harry) — 3:57
3. "Jusqu'au bout" (Brown, Martinelli, Mitchell, Winter, Winter) — 4:42
4. "Face to Face" (Mithra) — 4:01
5. "Revolution for Love" (Cutfather, Garrett, Joe, Martinelli) — 4:18
6. "Rien que pour lui" (J.Harry) — 4:50
7. "When I Got the Mood" (Hardt, Nakache, Nakache) — 4:49
8. "Keep It On the Red Light" (feat. Coolio) (R.Mitra / Coolio / Shorty / Bambi Cruz) — 4:19
9. "Dieu m'a donné la foi" (B.Godsend / D.Godsend - N.Hardt - P.Jerry / Adaptation : M.Winter ) — 3:58
10. "Everlasting Love" (B.Godsend /D.Godsend - G.Godsend - N.Hardt / Adpation : O.Winter) — 4:10
11. "Shame on U" (Hardt, Nakache, Nakache) — 4:38
12. "Let the River Flow" (Hardt, Nakache, Nakache) — 3:46
13. "Face to Face" (Slam Jam remix) (Mitra) — 4:02
14. "Dieu m'a donné la foi" (Dee Litherhaus bootleg) (Hardt, Nakache, Nakache, Perry) — 6:04
15. "The Air That I Breathe" (remix) (Harry) — 4:23
16. "Shame on U" (P4 Remix) (Hardt, Nakache, Nakache) — 4:35
17. "1000 Lbs Keep It on the Red Light" (Collio, Cruz, Mitra, Shorty) — 6:48

== Personnel ==
- Christophe Denis — guitar
- Siedah Garrett — vocals
- Gibson — adaptation
- Nick Martinelli — vocals
- Aisha McCray — vocals
- Don Phillips — vocals
- Daddy Waku — vocals
- Guy Waku — arranger, clavier
- Mickaël Winter — adaptation, vocals
- Ophélie Winter — adaptation, vocals
- Betty Wright — vocals
- Jeanette Wright — vocals

== Charts ==
=== Weekly charts ===
Chart (1996–1997)	Peak position
Belgian (Wallonia) Albums Chart	14
French SNEP Albums Chart	6

=== Year-end charts ===
Chart (1996)	Position
French Albums Chart	31

== Certifications ==
Certifications for No Soucy !
Region	Certification	Certified units/sales
France (SNEP)	Platinum	300,000^{*}
^{*} Sales figures based on certification alone.
