= Men, Women: A User's Manual =

- Directed by: Claude Lelouch
- Written by: Claude Lelouch; René Bonnell; Jean-Philippe Chatrier
- Produced by: Claude Lelouch; Jean-Paul De Vidas; Tania Zazulinsky
- Starring: Bernard Tapie; Fabrice Luchini; Alessandra Martines
- Cinematography: Philippe Pavans de Ceccatty
- Edited by: Hélène de Luze
- Music by: Francis Lai
- Production companies: TF1 Films Production; Les Films 13
- Distributed by: UGC Fox Distribution
- Release date: 28 August 1996
- Running time: 122 minutes
- Country: France
- Language: French
- Budget: $9.2 million
- Box office: $7.6 million

Men, Women: A User's Manual (French: Hommes, femmes, mode d'emploi) is a 1996 French film directed by Claude Lelouch.

== Plot ==
Fabio, a Paris cop, and a lawyer, Benoit, meet at the same clinic to have their ulcers checked. The two realize they share a passion for women but cannot stand the stress of living with them.

== Cast ==
- Bernard Tapie - Benoit Blanc
- Fabrice Luchini - Fabio Lini
- Alessandra Martines - Doctor Nitez
- Pierre Arditi - Lerner
- Ticky Holgado - Toc Toc, Loulou's father
- Agnès Soral - Fabio Lini's girlfriend
- Ophélie Winter - Pretty Blonde of Crillon
- Patrick Husson - Falsetto singer (voice)
- Salomé Lelouch - Lola Dufour (credited as Salomé)
- Christophe Hémon - Loulou, boy from train
- William Leymergie - Dufour
- Caroline Cellier - Madame Blanc
- Gisèle Casadesus - Clara Blanc, Benoit's mother
- Daniel Gélin - The widower
- Anouk Aimée - The widow
- Philippe Khorsand - Restaurant chief
- Ginette Garcin
- Antoine Duléry
- Julien Courbey

== Production ==
The film was the acting debut of businessman-turned-politician Bernard Tapie. A prominent public figure in France, Tapie had been the owner of Adidas and the Olympique de Marseille soccer team, a member of the European Parliament and briefly a government member. Following his bankruptcy and inelegibility from public office, Tapie turned to artistic endeavors with Lelouch capitalizing for this film on his fame among the French public.
