= Tout doit disparaître =

- Directed by: Philippe Muyl
- Written by: Philippe Muyl; Philippe Le Dem
- Produced by: Christian Fechner; Hervé Truffaut
- Starring: Didier Bourdon; Yolande Moreau; Élie Semoun; Ophélie Winter; José Garcia
- Cinematography: Luc Drion
- Edited by: Françoise Garnault
- Music by: Zazie; Pierre Jaconelli; Christophe Voisin
- Production companies: Canal+ TF1 Films Production; Les Films Christian Fechner
- Distributed by: UGC Fox Distribution
- Release date: 22 January 1997
- Running time: 100 minutes
- Country: France
- Language: French
- Budget: $5.4 million
- Box office: $6.9 million

Everything Must Disappear (French: Tout doit disparaître) is a 1997 French comedy film directed by Philippe Muyl.

== Plot ==
Robert Millard has based his industrial kingdom - based on all the noise technologies - thanks to his marriage with the wealthy and cantankerous Irene, he blithely cheat for years. However, his last link with his pretty secretary, Eve, is the straw that broke the camel : Irene has indeed hired a detective-photographer, aptly named M.Colle order to have a maximum of incriminating shots. Threatened to divorce and thus to total ruin by his wife, the unfaithful husband should give up and dismiss Eve.

Decided not to let themselves dictated by his wife and too cowardly to leave his fortune, CEO at random for an air trip, he meets Gérard Piche, novelist police station, specializing in the perfect crime. Millard then contracts with the naive writer so that he write his new novel, a new murder without evidence overwhelming, one last perfect crime ... Robert has followed carefully to remove the cumbersome Irene. But nothing will really unfold as planned ... all under the objective of tenacious M.Colle.

== Cast ==
- Didier Bourdon as Robert Millard
- Yolande Moreau as Irene Millard
- Élie Semoun as Gerard Piche
- Ophélie Winter as Eve Latour
- José Garcia as Detective Colle
- Régis Laspalès as The hypnotist
- Andrée Damant as Annie
- Luc Palun as Bernard
- Didier Bénureau as The notary
- Paule Daré as The new secretary
- Marie Borowski as The fat lady
- Peter King as The loud man

== Reception ==
The film opened in France on 306 screens and finished second at the box office with a gross of $2.5 million for the week, placing it second behind the debuting Ransom.
