= Steve Sola =

American audio engineer and music producer

- Also known as: The Mix King
- Origin: United States
- Genres: Hip hop, R&B, pop, rock
- Occupations: Audio engineer, mixing engineer, record producer, songwriter
- Years active: 1995–present
- Label: Plain Truth Entertainment
- Website: www.themixking.com

Steve Sola, also known professionally as The Mix King, is an American record producer, mixing engineer, and audio engineer known for his work in hip hop, R&B, and pop music. He has collaborated with artists such as Mobb Deep, Nas, Eminem, Lil Wayne, and Jodeci.

== Career ==
Sola began his music career in the 1990s, building a reputation as a skilled mixer and engineer in the New York City hip hop scene. His early work includes mixing and engineering for the hip hop group Mobb Deep, contributing heavily to albums such as Murda Muzik.

Over his career, Sola has worked with a wide range of artists and producers, including Nas, Eminem, Lil Wayne, Jodeci, Method Man, and Tyler Perry. He is known within the industry for his mixing techniques and production style across various genres.

He is the founder and chief executive officer of Plain Truth Entertainment, an independent record label and commercial recording studio complex based in New York City.

== Notable work ==
Sola's prominent industry credits include:

- Mixing tracks on Murda Muzik by Mobb Deep
- Engineering for Nas on various studio projects
- Strategic technical integration and equipment profiling with HARMAN and JBL Professional hardware

== Discography ==
Sola's extensive technical engineering, production, and mixing credits are documented across multi-platinum and gold-certified releases.

- 1996: Trans-Siberian Orchestra – Christmas Eve and Other Stories (Engineering)
- 1998: Nicole Wray – Make It Hot (Engineering)
- 1999: Mobb Deep – Murda Muzik (Mixing, Engineering)
- 2000: Prodigy – H.N.I.C. (Mixing, Recording)
- 2001: Mobb Deep – Infamy (Mixing, Recording)
- 2004: Mobb Deep – Amerikaz Nightmare (Mixing, Engineering)
- 2005: The Notorious B.I.G. – Duets: The Final Chapter (Mixing)
