= Eddie Lovette =

- Born: Eddie Lovett; 1943; Cairo, Georgia
- Died: April 29, 1998 (aged 55)
- Genres: Reggae

Eddie Lovette (born Eddie Lovett, 1943 – April 29, 1998) was a Coconut Grove reggae musician. He recorded six albums, that all have a strong Caribbean influence.

Lovette was born in the town of Cairo in the state of Georgia. He was the fourth of ten children. When he was nine years old, he joined the Cairo Echo Jr's gospel singing group. An alum of Miami High School, Lovette went on to earn a degree in Psychology from the University of Miami. While pursuing his degree, Lovette was part of a singing group called "Eddie and The Tropics".

Lovette got a taste for fame when The Tropics performed at the Copacabana Supper club in Manhattan. In 1984, he was named the Top International Male Singer by the Canadian Reggae Music Awards. In 1969, his cover of Bob Andy's "Too Experienced" ranked 95 on the U.S Billboard Hot 100. He died from lung cancer in 1998, at age 55.
