= Funky Nassau =

Single by The Beginning of the End

from the album Funky Nassau
- B-side: "Funky Nassau-Part II"
- Released: March 1971
- Genre: Funk
- Length: 3:10
- Label: Alston
- Songwriter(s): Ray Munnings, Tyrone Fitzgerald
- Producer(s): Marlin Productions

The Beginning of the End singles chronology
| "Monkey Tamarind" (1971) | "Funky Nassau" (1971) | "Come Down Baby" (1972) |

"Funky Nassau" is a song written by Ray Munnings and Tyrone Fitzgerald and performed by the Beginning of the End.

The song was recorded at Criteria Studios in Miami, engineered by Chuck Kirkpatrick, produced by Marlin Productions and arranged by the Beginning of the End.

It reached No.7 on the US R&B chart, No.15 on the Billboard Hot 100 the week of July 17, 1971 and No.31 on the UK Singles Chart in 1974. The song was featured on their 1971 album, Funky Nassau.

The single ranked No.75 on Billboard's Year-End Hot 100 singles of 1971.

== Chart performance ==
| Chart (1971) | Peak position |
|---|---|
| US Billboard Hot 100 | 15 |
| US Billboard Best Selling Soul Singles | 7 |

| Chart (1974) | Peak position |
|---|---|
| UK Singles (The Official Charts Company) | 31 |

== Other versions ==
- Herbie Mann recorded it and subsequently released it as a bonus track on the CD version of his 1971 studio album Push Push.
- Orgone included their take of the song on their 2007 album The Killion Floor.

== Song sampling ==
- The song was sampled in the Prodigy's song "No Good (Start the Dance)" on their 1994 album Music for the Jilted Generation. A mixed version was also included as part of "Section 8" on their 1999 album The Dirtchamber Sessions Volume One.

== In popular culture ==
- The Blues Brothers performed it in the 1998 film Blues Brothers 2000.
- The Beginning of the End's version was featured in the 2005 film Elizabethtown.
- Swedish artist Säkert! refers to it in her song which also shares the name "Funky Nassau".
