= No Pain, No Gain (song) =

1988 single by Betty Wright

Single by Betty Wright

from the album Mother Wit
- Released: March 4, 1988
- Genre: R&B
- Length: 5:12
- Label: Ms.B
- Songwriter(s): Betty Wright
- Producer(s): Betty Wright; Noel Williams

Betty Wright singles chronology
"The Sun Don't Shine" (1986)	"No Pain, No Gain" (1988)	"After the Pain" (1988)

Music video
- "No Pain, No Gain" on YouTube

"No Pain, No Gain" (Note: "No Pain, No Gain" originally appeared on the album Mother Wit as "No Pain, (No Gain)".) is a song written, co-produced and performed by American contemporary R&B singer Betty Wright; issued as the lead single from her twelfth studio album Mother Wit. The song peaked at #14 on the Billboard R&B chart in 1988.

== Charts ==
Chart performance for "No Pain, No Gain"
Chart (1988)	Peak position
US Hot R&B/Hip-Hop Singles & Tracks (Billboard)	14
