= Alston Records =

American record label

Alston Records was an American record label founded by Henry Stone and Steve Alaimo in 1964 that went bankrupt in 1981. Artists previously on its roster include Bill Pursell, Betty Wright, The Beginning of the End ("Funky Nassau"), Jimmy "Bo" Horne, Clarence Reid, Timmy Thomas and Sam & Dave.
