= The Beginning of the End (band) =

- Origin: Nassau, Bahamas
- Genres: Funk; Goombay; Calypso; R&B; Latin music; jazz
- Years active: 1969–1975
- Labels: Alston Records; Atlantic

The Beginning of the End was a funk group from Nassau, Bahamas. The group formed in 1969 and consisted of three brothers (Frank, Raphael "Ray", and Roy Munnings), a fourth member on bass (Fred Henfield), and a fifth on guitar (Livingston Colebrook). They were complemented by the Funky Nassau Horns.

They released an album entitled Funky Nassau in 1971 on Alston Records (a subsidiary of Atlantic Records), and the track "Funky Nassau" became a hit single in the U.S., peaking at #15 on the Billboard Hot 100 chart, and #7 on the Billboard R&B chart. The same track reached #31 in the UK Singles Chart in March 1971.

== Members ==
- Raphael "Ray" Munnings - organ
- Roy Munnings - guitar
- Frank Munnings - drums
- Fred Henfield - bass
- Livingston Colebrook - guitar

== Discography ==
=== Albums ===
Year	Album	Record label
1971	Funky Nassau	Alston Records
1976	Beginning of the End	Alston Records

=== Singles ===
Year	Title	Peak chart positions			Record Label	B-side	Album
Year	Title	US	US R&B	UK	Record Label	B-side	Album
1971	"Monkey Tamarind"	—	—	—	Alston Records	"Hey Pretty Girl"	Funky Nassau
1971	"Funky Nassau"	15	7	31	Alston Records	"Funky Nassau-Part II"	Funky Nassau
1972	"Come Down Baby"	—	—	—	Alston Records	"Come Down Baby-Part II"	Funky Nassau
1972	"Doin' the Funky Do"	—	—	—	Alston Records	"Fishman"	
