= Ophélie Winter =

French singer

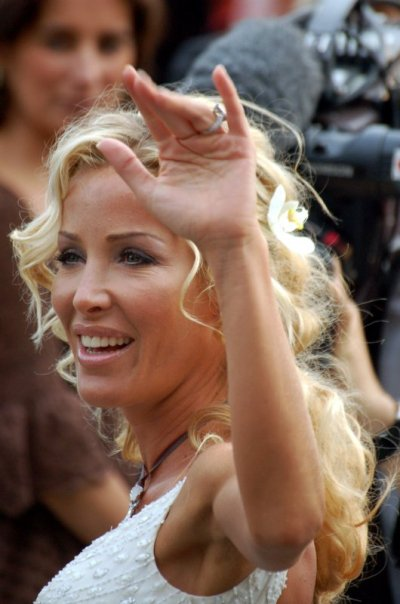
- Winter at the 2006 Cannes Film Festival

Background information
- Born: Ophélie Kleerekoper-Winter; 20 February 1974 (age 52); Boulogne-Billancourt, France
- Occupations: Singer, actress
- Label: Warner Music France

Ophélie Kleerekoper-Winter (born 20 February 1974) is a French pop and R&B singer and actress. She is the daughter of Dutch singer David Alexandre Winter and French fashion model Catherine Fefeu. She rose to prominence in much of Europe after signing with EastWest Records in 1995 and released her hit song "Dieu m'a donné la foi" which reached number one on the French singles chart as well as other hits: "le feu qui m'attise", "Shame on U", "Elle Pleure"" and "Sache"".

== Early life ==
Winter was born in Boulogne-Billancourt, Hauts-de-Seine. Her father David Alexandre Winter was a Dutch pop singer who had some success during the 1970s, while her mother Catherine Fefeu was a French fashion model, who is now her agent. Her brother Michael is a singer and TV presenter.

Her parents divorced when she was just two years old and she moved to Paris with her mother and brother, while her father left for the United States. In 1984, at the age of 10, she recorded her first song in France, La Chanson des Klaxons and three years later another song, Poil de Carotte, in French. At the age of 17, she was discovered by a modeling agent on the Champs-Élysées in Paris and after three years of modeling, she decided to become a singer and an actress.

== Career ==
Ophélie Winter has released four studio albums starting in 1996, with her debut album, No Soucy !, which her brother collaborated on, Privacy, Explicit Lyrics and Résurrection. The singer Prince wrote her a song. It was announced at one point that Prince intended The Most Beautiful Girl In The World, to be recorded in multiple languages by local artists, but it is unknown how many of these recordings took place; one recording that was made was Le Garçon Le Plus Beau Dans L’Univers by French model and actress Ophélie Winter (intended for a single, Le Garçon Le Plus Beau Dans L’Univers), but this remains unreleased. Ophélie Winter was a featured model in a photoshoot with Prince/0)+> in 1995, holding his gold symbol guitar.

In 2014, she participated in the fifth season of Danse avec les stars, the French version of Dancing with the Stars. She was partnered with professional dancer Christophe Licata. On 10 October 2014 they were eliminated finishing 10th out of 11 contestants.

She currently resides in Paris making various TV appearances. Her look-alike puppet is in the French show "Les Guignols de l'info" (1988).

== Awards and nominations ==
Award	Year	Nominee(s)	Category	Result	Ref.
NRJ Music Awards	2000	Herself	Francophone Female Artist of the Year	Nominated	
NRJ Music Awards	2003	Herself	Francophone Female Artist of the Year	Nominated	
NRJ Music Awards	2004	Herself	Francophone Female Artist of the Year	Nominated	

== Discography ==
- No Soucy ! (1996)
- Privacy (1998)
- Explicit Lyrics (2002)
- Resurrection (2009)

Year	Title	Peak chart positions					Certifications françaises	Album
		France	France TL	Belgium	Switzerland	Germany		
1984	La chanson des klaxons (avec Bob)	—	—	—	—	—		Non-album single
1987	Poil de carotte	—	—	—	—	—	—	Non-album single
1992	When I got the Mood	—	—	—	—	—	—	Non-album single
1993	Shame on You	—	—	—	—	—	—	Non-album single
1994	Dad	—	—	—	—	—	—	Non-album single
1994	Pour une lady	—	—	—	—	—	—	Non-album single
1995	Dieu m'a donné la foi	1		3			Or	No Soucy !
1996	Le feu qui m'attise	7		21			Argent	No Soucy !
?	Shame on U	9					Argent	No Soucy !
1997	Keep it on the red light (feat. Coolio)	19						No Soucy !
	Rien que pour lui	39						No Soucy !
1998	Je Marche À L'envers	23		12				Privacy
	I Spy					72		Privacy
	Elle pleure	12		9			Argent	Privacy
1999	Je cours							Privacy
?	Je t'abandonne	39		30				Privacy
2000	Ce que je suis	75						Privacy
2002	Sache	6		7	21		Argent Explicit Lyrics	
2003	Tout l'monde le fait	38		28	75			
?	Yeah Yeah Yeah							
2009	Affection						Résurrection	
2010	Sunshine							
2010	Ne va pas croire							

== Selected filmography ==
Year	Title	Role	Director	Notes
1996	Hommes, femmes, mode d'emploi	Pretty Blonde of Crillon	Claude Lelouch	
1997	Tout doit disparaître	Eve Latour	Philippe Muyl	
1997	Bouge!	Herself	Jérôme Cornuau	
1998	Folle d'elle	Lisa	Jérôme Cornuau (2)	
2000	2001: A Space Travesty	Cassandra Menage	Allan A. Goldstein	
2000	La cape et l'épée	Cardinal Claudia's Girl		TV series (1 episode)
2001	She	Ayesha	Timothy Bond	
2001	Pretty Things	Jessica	Gilles Paquet-Brenner	
2001	My Wife Is an Actress	Famous girl in the train	Yvan Attal	
2003	Mauvais esprit	Chrystèle Porel	Patrick Alessandrin	
2010	R.I.S, police scientifique	Isabelle Ballancourt	François Guérin	TV series (1 episode)
2013	Doc Martin	Rebecca Mikelin	Jean-Pierre Sinapi	TV series (1 episode)
