= List of disco artists =

This is a list of artists primarily associated with the disco era of the 1970s and some of their most noteworthy disco hits. Numerous artists, not usually considered disco artists, implemented some of the styles and sounds of disco music, and are also included. This includes artists who have either been very important to the genre or have had a considerable amount of exposure (such as those that have been on a major label). Bands are listed by the first letter in their name (not including the words "a", "an", or "the"), and individuals are listed by last name.

== 0–9 ==
- 101 Strings
  - "Disco Fever" (1979), "Bye Bye Blackbird" (1979)
- 5000 Volts
  - "I'm On Fire" (1975) (lead vocal performed by Tina Charles), "Dr Kiss Kiss" (1976),
- 5th Dimension
  - "Love Hangover" (1976), "Star Dancing" (1978), "You Are The Reason I Feel Like Dancing" (1978)

== A ==
- ABBA
  - "Dancing Queen" (1976), "Money, Money, Money" (1976), "Take a Chance on Me" (1978), "Summer Night City" (1978), "Does Your Mother Know" (1979), "Voulez-Vous" (1979), "Gimme! Gimme! Gimme! (A Man After Midnight)" (1979), "As Good as New" (1979), "On and On and On" (1980), "Super Trouper" (1980), "Lay All Your Love on Me" (1981), "The Visitors" (1982)
- Al Hudson and the Partners
  - "Spread Love" (1978), "You Can Do It" (1979), "Happy Feet" (1979)
- Peter Allen
  - "I Go To Rio" (1977)
- Alton McClain & Destiny
  - "It Must Be Love" (1978), "Crazy Love" (1979)
- Bill Anderson
  - "I Can't Wait Any Longer" (1978), "Double S" (1978)
- Andrea True Connection
  - "More More More" (1976), "Party Line" (1976), "What's Your Name, What's Your Number" (1977), "N.Y., You Got Me Dancing" (1977), "Fill Me Up (Heart to Heart)" (1977)
- Ruby Andrews (R&B, disco)
  - "Queen of the Disco" (1977)
- Paul Anka
  - "One Man Woman/One Woman Man" (1975)
- Ann-Margret
  - "Love Rush (In E-Minor)" (1979), "Midnight Message" (1979), "Everybody Needs Somebody Sometime" (1981)
- Arabesque
  - "Hello, Mr. Monkey" "Friday Night" (1978), "Peppermint Jack" (1979)
- Archie Bell & the Drells
  - "Let's Go Disco" (1976), "Let's Groove" (1976), "The Soul City Walk" (1976), "Everybody Have A Good Time" (1977), "Don't Let Love Get You Down" (1977), "Strategy" (1979)
- Arthur Fiedler and the Boston Pops Orchestra
  - "Saturday Night Fever Medley" (1979), "Bachmania" (1979)
- Ashford & Simpson
  - "Over and Over" (1976), "It Seems to Hang On" (1978), "Get Up and Do Something" (1978), "Flashback" (1978), "Found A Cure" (1979), "Nobody Knows" (1979), "Dance Forever" (1979), "Solid" (1984)
- Atlantic Starr
  - "Stand Up" (1978), "Being In Love With You Is So Much Fun" (1978), "Keep It Comin'" (1978), "Straight to the Point" (1979)
- Frankie Avalon
  - "Venus" (1976)
- Roy Ayers
  - "Running Away" (1977), "Get On Up, Get On Down" (1978), "Fever" (1979), "Love Will Bring Us Back Together" (1979)

== B ==
- B.T. Express
  - "Do It" (1974), "Express" (1974), "Peace Pipe" (1975), "Energy To Burn" (1976), "Expose Yourself" (1977)
- Babe Ruth
  - ”Elusive” (1975)
- Baccara
  - "Yes Sir, I Can Boogie" (1977), "Sorry, I'm a Lady" (1977), "Darling" (1978), "Parlez-vous français?" (1978)
- Baciotti (France)
  - "Black Jack" (1977)
- J.J. Barnes
  - "How Long" (1977)
- Barrabás
  - "Woman" (1971), "Hi-Jack" (1974), "Mellow Blow" (1975), "Broadway Star" (1976), "Desperately" (1976), "On the Road Again" (1981), "Please Mr Reagan, Please Mr Breznev" (1982)
- Claudja Barry
  - "Sweet Dynamite" (1977), "Love for the Sake of Love" (1977), "Dancin' Fever" (1977), "Love Machine" (1977), "Sunshine Love" (1978), "Boogie-Woogie Dancin' Shoes" (1979), "Love Of The Hurtin' Kind" (1979), "Boogie Tonight" (1979), "Radio Action" (1981), "Work Me Over" (1983), "Born To Love" (1983), "I Will Follow Him" (1985), "Down And Counting" (1986), "Reach Out For Me" (1997)
- Peter Batah
  - "Rock Me Now" (1980), "Nobody's Stopping You" (1981)
- Bazuka
  - "Dynomite" (1975), "(C'est) Le Rock" (1979)
- The Beach Boys
  - "Here Comes the Night" (1979)
- Celi Bee
  - "Macho (A Real Real One)" (1977), "Superman" (1977), "One Love" (1978), "Love Drops" (1979), "Fly Me on the Wings of Love" (1979), "Donkey, Donkey" (1979)
- Bee Gees
  - "Jive Talkin'" (1975), "Nights On Broadway" (1975), "You Should Be Dancing" (1976), "You Stepped Into My Life" (1976), "Love So Right" (1976), "Can't Keep A Good Man Down" (1976), "Subway" (1976), "Boogie Child" (1977), "Stayin' Alive" (1977), "Night Fever" (1978), "More Than A Woman" (1978), "Tragedy" (1979), "Love You Inside Out" (1979)
- Bell & James
  - "Livin' It Up (Friday Night)" (1978)
- Belle Epoque
  - "Miss Broadway" (1977), "Disco Sound/Black is Black" (1977)
- George Benson
  - "On Broadway" (1977), "Give Me The Night" (1980), "Love X Love" (1980), "Never Give Up On A Good Thing" (1982), "Turn Your Love Around" (1982)
- Asha Bhosle (India)
  - "Mil Gaya Humko Saathi" (1977), "Jab Chaye Mera Jadoo" (1980), Pyaar Karnewale" (1982), "Disco Station" (1982), "Dil Le Gayi" (1997), "Khallas" (2003)
- Biddu Orchestra
  - "A Man and a Woman" (1976), "Voodoo Man" (1976), "Driving in the Rain" (1977), "The Stud" (1977), "Soul Coaxing" (1978), "James Bond Disco Theme" (1978)
- Bill Summers and Summers Heat
  - "Dancing Lady" (1978), "Musicland" (1979)
- Bionic Boogie
  - "Risky Changes" (1977), "Hot Butterfly" (1978), "Fess Up To The Boogie" (1978), "Cream Always Rises To Top" (1978)
- Stephen Bishop
  - "Save It for a Rainy Day" (1976)
- Cilla Black
  - "Silly Boy" (1978), "Sugar Daddy" (1978)
- Jay Black
  - "One-Night Affair" (1977), "Love Is in the Air" (1979)
- Blondie
  - "Heart Of Glass" (1979), "Atomic" (1980), "Call Me" (1980), "Rapture" (1981)
- Blue Magic
  - "Look Me Up" (1973), "We're on the Right Track" (1975)
- The Bob Crewe Generation
  - "Street Talk" (1976), "Menage a Trois" (1978)
- Angela Bofill
  - "People Make the World Go 'Round" (1979), "Angel of the Night", (1979), "Something About You" (1981)
- Hamilton Bohannon
  - "Disco Stomp" (1975), "Let's Start the Dance" (1978), "Fire Cracker" (1979), "Disco Symphony" (1979)
- Boney M.
  - "Daddy Cool" (1976), "Sunny" (1976), "Ma Baker" (1977), "Belfast" (1977), "Rivers Of Babylon" (1978), "Rasputin" (1978), "Hooray Hooray It's A Holi Holiday" (1979), "Gotta Go Home" (1979), "Painter Man" (1979), "We Kill The World" (1981), "Young Free & Single" (1985)
- Taka Boom
  - "Night Dancin'" (1979), "To Hell With Him" (1983)
- Booster
  - "Dance Like A Robot" (1978)
- Patti Boulaye
  - "Funky Love" (1976), "Stop It, I Like It" (1979), "Disco Dancer" (1979)
- David Bowie
  - "1984" (1974), "Fame" (1975), "Golden Years" (1976), “The Secret Life of Arabia” (1978), "John, I'm Only Dancing (Again)" (1979), "Fashion" (1980), "Let's Dance" (1983)
- Brainstorm
  - "We're on Our Way" (1976), "Lovin' Is Really My Game" (1977), "Hot for You" (1978), "Case of the Boogie" (1979)
- Bill Brandon
  - "We Fell in Love While Dancing" (1977)
- Laura Branigan
  - "Gloria" (1982), "Self Control" (1984), "The Lucky One" (1984), "Spanish Eddie" (1985), "Shattered Glass" (1987), "Dim All The Lights" (1995)
- Brass Construction
  - "Movin'" (1976), "Changin'" (1976), "Ha Cha Cha" (1977), "Screwed" (1977), "Starting Tomorrow" (1978), "One To One" (1978), "Get Up" (1978), "Get Up to Get Down" (1979)
- Brenda and the Tabulations
  - "Everybody's Fool" (1979)
- Brenda Mickens & The Plain English Band
  - "One More Time" (1986)
- Brick
  - "Dazz" (1976), "Dusic" (1977)
- The Brides of Funkenstein
  - "Disco to Go" (1978)
- Alicia Bridges
  - "I Love The Nightlife (Disco Round)" (1978), "Body Heat" (1979)
- Johnny Bristol
  - "Hang On In There Baby" (1974), "Do It to My Mind" (1976), "I Sho Like Groovin' With You" (1976)
- Alma Faye Brooks
  - "Stop, I Don't Need No Sympathy" (1977), "It's Over" (1979), "Don't Fall in Love" (1979), "Thank You" (1979)
- Pattie Brooks
  - "Let's Make Love to the Music" (1977), "Love-Shook" (1977), "After Dark" (1978), "Heartbreak in Disguise" (1978), "Got Tu Go Disco" (1979), "Party Girl" (1979)
- The Brothers Johnson
  - "Get the Funk out of ma Face" (1976), Stomp!" (1980), "Light Up The Night" (1980)
- Brotherhood of Man
  - "Sweet Lady from Georgia" (1976), "Be My Lovin' Baby" (1976), "Oh Boy (The Mood I'm In)" (1977), "Figaro" (1978), "Beautiful Lover" (1978), "Sleeping Beauty" (1979), "Tell Me How" (1979), "Taxi" (1979), "Ole Ole" (1979), "Gypsy" (1979),
- James Brown
  - "Hot Pants - Pt1" (1971), "Make it Funky - Pt1" (1971), "Stoned to the Bone" (1973), "Hustle!!! (Dead on it)" 1975), "Sex Machine" (1975), "Get Up Offa That Thing" (1976), "Bobyheat" (1976), "It's Too Funky In Here" (1979)
- Jocelyn Brown
  - "I'm Caught Up (In A One Night Love Affair)" (1979), "Somebody Else's Guy" (1984)
- Miquel Brown
  - "Symphony of Love" (1978), "The Day They Got Disco in Brazil" (1979), "This Is Something New to Me" (1979), "So Many Men, So Little Time" (1983), "Beeline" (1983), "He's A Saint He's A Sinner (1984)
- Peter Brown
  - "Do Ya Wanna Get Funky With Me" (1977), "Dance With Me" (with Betty Wright) (1977), "Crank It Up (Funk Town)" (1979), "It's Alright" (1979)
- Max Bygraves
  - "Get Me to the Church on Time" (1979), "How Ya Gonna Keep 'em Down on the Farm" (1979), "(Won't You Come Home) Bill Bailey" (1979), "Ma! He's Making Eyes at Me" (1979), "My Mammy" (1979), "Tulips from Amsterdam" (1979), "Love is a Song" (1979), "Somebody Stole My Gal" (1979)

== C ==
- C.J. & Company
  - "We Got Our Own Thing" (1977), "Devil's Gun" (1977), "Big-City Sidewalk" (1978)
- Cab Calloway
  - "Minnie the Moocher" (1978)
- Capricorn
  - "Capricorn" (1980), "Pow Pow Pow" (1981), "I Need Love" (1982)
- CarCrash
  - "Dancin' In The Neonlights" (1980),
- Carl Carlton
  - "Everlasting Love" (1974), "She's A Bad Mama Jama" (1981), "Baby I Need Your Loving" (1982)
- The Carpenters
  - "(Want You) Back in My Life Again" (1981)
- Ralph Carter
  - "When You're Young and In Love" (1975), "Extra Extra (Read All about It)" (1975)
- David Cassidy
  - "Get It Up For Love" (1975), "Hurt So Bad" (1979)
- Verónica Castro
  - "Yo Creo en el Mañana" (1979), "Macumba" (1986)
- Cerrone
  - "Love In C-Minor" (1976), "Cerrone's Paradise" (1977), "Supernature" (1978), "Call Me Tonight" (1979)
- The Chakachas
  - "Jungle Fever" (1972)
- Marilyn Chambers
  - "Benihana" (1977)
- Gene Chandler
  - "Get Down" (1978), "When You're #1" (1978), "That Funky Disco Rhythm" (1979), "Dance Fever" (1979)
- Chanson
  - "Don't Hold Back" (1978), "Jack Be Nimble" (1978), "I Can Tell" (1979)
- Ray Charles
  - "I Can See Clearly Now" (1977), "Game Number Nine" (1978), "Ridin' Thumb" (1978), "You 20th Century Fox" (1978), "Some Enchanted Evening" (1979)
- Tina Charles
  - "I Love to Love (But My Baby Loves to Dance)" (1976), "Dance Little Lady Dance" (1976), "Dr Love" (1976), "Disco Fever" (1976), "Love Bug" (1977), "Time for a Change of Heart" (1977), "I'll Go Where Your Music Takes Me" (1977), "Boogie around the Clock" (1979)
- Charo (with the Salsoul Orchestra)
  - "Dance a Little Bit Closer" (1977), "(Mamacita) Dónde Está Santa Claus?" (1978), "Stay with Me" (1978), "Concierto De Aranjuez" (1979), "Hot Love" (1979), "The Love Boat Theme" (1979)
- Cher
  - "Take Me Home" (1979), "Wasn't It Good" (1979), "Hell on Wheels" (1979), "Bad Love" (1980), "Believe" (1999), "All or Nothing" (1999), "Strong Enough" (1999)
- Chéri
  - "Murphy's Law" (1982)
- Karen Cheryl
  - "Sing To Me Mama (1978), "Sweet Melody" (1978), "Tchoo Tchoo (Hold on The Line)" (1979)
- The Chi-Lites
  - "You Don't Have To Go" (1976), "Higher" (1979), "Hot On A Thing (Called Love)" (1981)
- Chic
  - "Dance Dance Dance (Yowsah, Yowsah, Yowsah)" (1977), "Everybody Dance" (1977), "Le Freak" (1978), "I Want Your Love" (1978), "Chic Cheer" (1978), "Good Times" (1979), "My Forbidden Lover" (1979), "Rebels Are We" (1980)
- Chicago
  - "Street Player" (1979)
- Chilly
  - "For Your Love" (1978)
- Alisha Chinai (India)
  - Zubi Zubi (1987), Zindagi Meri Dance (1987), Babusha (1988), Superman (1988), Made in India (1995), Lover Girl (1995)
- The Choice Four
  - "Is It Love?" (1975)
- Chromium
  - "Fly On UFO" (1978), "Caribbean Air Control" (1978)
- Chuck Cissel
  - "Cisselin' Hot" (1979)
- Claire
  - "High On Love" (1978)
- Petula Clark
  - "Downtown '77" (1977), "La Chanson D'Evita" (1977), "Just A Dance With Time" (1978)
- Linda Clifford
  - "From Now On" (1977), "Runaway Love" (1978), "If My Friends Could See Me Now" (1978), "Don't Give It Up" (1979), "Bridge Over Troubled Water" (1979), "Red Light" (1980), "Lonely Night" (1980), "Bailin' Out" (1980), "Shoot Your Best Shot" (1980)
- Freddy Cole
  - "One More Love Song" (1978), "The Day That My Heart Caught Fire" (1979), "Everybody's Talkin'" (1979), "Summer Love" (1980), "Teach Me Tonight" (1980), "This Song's for You" (1980)
- Natalie Cole
  - "This Will Be (An Everlasting Love)" (1975), "Mr. Melody" (1976), "Annie Mae" (1977), "Stand By" (1979), "Don't Look Back" (1980)
- The Commodores
  - "Machine Gun" (instrumental) (1974), "The Bump" (1974) "Slippery When Wet" (1975), "Fancy Dancer" (1976), "Brick House" (1977), "Too Hot Ta Trot" (1978), "Midnight Magic" (1979), "Lady (You Bring Me Up)" (1981)
- Norman Connors
  - "Once I've Been There" (1977), "Disco Land" (1979)
- Annie Cordy
  - "The Queen Of The Disco" (1978)
- Alec R. Costandinos (France)
  - "Romeo & Juliet" (1977)
- Floyd Cramer
  - "Theme from the Television Series 'Dallas'" (1980)
- Randy Crawford
  - "Blue Flame" (1980)
- Papa John Creach
  - "Joyce" (1976)
- Sonny Criss
  - "Cool Struttin'" (1976), "That's the Way of the World" (1976)
- Crown Heights Affair
  - "Dreaming a Dream" (1975), "Every Beat of My Heart" (1976), "Do It Your Way" (1976), "Dream World" (1978), "Dance, Lady, Dance" (1979), "You Gave Me Love" (1980)
- The Crusaders
  - "Street Life" (1979)
- Chantal Curtis
  - "Get Another Love" (1979), "Hit Man" (1979), "Hey Taxi Driver" (1979)
- Clem Curtis
  - "Unchained Melody/Need Your Love" (1979)

== D ==
- Dadmandog
  - "In the Morning" (2021), "Generation" (2021), "You Should Know" (2021), "Low Level" (2022), "Take a Shower" (2023)
- Lupita D'Alessio
  - "Sobreviviré" (1979), "Te Quiero Como Te Quiero" (1982), "1+2=Enamorados" (1982), "Será Porque Te Amo" (1982), "Como Decirte, Como Explicarte" (1982), "Aquella Melodía" (1982), "Que Sí, Que No" (1982), "Morir Por Tu Amor" (1982), "Ardiente" (1982), "Esta Vez Sí Se Acabó" (1986), "Engañada Por Ti" (1986), "Mujer de un Solo Hombre" (1988), "Mejor Nos Vemos" (1988)
- Dalida
  - "J'attendrai" (1975), "Bésame Mucho" (1976), "Femme est la nuit" (1977), "Génération 78" (1978), "Ça me fait rêver" (1978), "Laissez-moi Danser" (1979), "Gigi in Paradisco" (1980)
- Dalton & Dubarri
  - "I (You) Can Dance All By My- (Your-) Self" (1979)
- Dana
  - "Fairytale" (1976), "Break the Ice" (1979), "Somethings Cooking In The Kitchen" (1979), "I Feel Love Comin' On" (1982)
- Sarah Dash (Former The Bluebelles)
  - "Sinner Man" (1978), "(Come and Take This) Candy from your Baby" (1979)
- Dave & Sugar
  - "Stay With Me" (1979), "It's A Heartache" (1981)
- Helen Davis
  - "(I Can't Get No) Satisfaction" (1977)
- Sammy Davis, Jr.
  - "Baretta's Theme (Keep Your Eye on the Sparrow)" (1976), "We'll Make it This Time" (1976), "That Old Black Magic" (1979)
- DD Sound
  - "1234 Gimme Some More" (1977)
- Dulce
  - "Mi Corazón es para ti" (1979), "Por Ti" (1982), "Tú De Repente Tú" (1982)
- The Dear Hunter
  - "King of Swords (Reversed)" (2015)
- The Dells
  - "Face to Face" (1979), "All About The Paper" (1980), "Your Song" (1980)
- Lila Deneken
  - Así es la vida (1979), Adelante (1979)
- Teri DeSario
  - "Ain't Nothing Gonna Keep Me From You" (1978), "The Stuff That Dreams Are Made Of" (1978), "Moonlight Madness" (1979), "With You Love" (1979)
- Daddy Dewdrop
  - "Nanu Nanu (I Wanna Funk with You)" (1978), "The Real Thing" (1979), "If You Wanna Wanna" (1979)
- Gregg Diamond
  - "This Side of Midnight" (1978), "Fancy Dancer" (1978), "Danger" (1979), "Starcruiser" (1979)
- Disco-Tex and the Sex-O-Lettes
  - "Get Dancin'" (1974), "I Wanna Dance Wit' Choo (Doo Dat Dance)" (1975)
- The Doobie Brothers
  - "What A Fool Believes" (1978)
- The Dooleys
  - "Wanted" (1979)
- Double Exposure "Ten Percent" (1976), "Everyman Has To Carry His Own Weight" (1976)
- Carl Douglas
  - "Kung Fu Fighting" (1974), "Dance The Kung Fu" (1974)
- Carol Douglas
  - "Doctor's Orders" (1975), "Midnight Love Affair" (1976), "I Want to Stay with You" (1977), "Night Fever" (1978), "Fell in Love for the First Time Today" (1978), "I Got the Answer" (1979), "Come into My Life" (1979)
- Lamont Dozier
  - "Boogie Business" (1979), "Going Back to My Roots" (1977)
- Dr. Buzzard's Original Savannah Band
  - "Sour And Sweet" (1976), "I'll Play The Fool" (1976)
  - "Cherchez La Femme" (1975)
- Dschinghis Khan
  - "Dschinghis Khan" (1979), "Moskau"(1980)
- Ronnie Dyson
  - "If the Shoe Fits" (1979), "Couples Only" (1979)

== E ==
- Charles Earland
  - "Drifting" (1977), "Over and Over" (1978), "Let the Music Play" (1978)
- The Earls
  - "Tonight (Could Be The Night)" (1977)
- Earth, Wind & Fire
  - "Shining Star" (1975), "Getaway" (1976), "Serpentine Fire" (1977), "Fantasy" (1978), "Got to Get You Into My Life" (1978), "September" (1978), "Boogie Wonderland" (duet with The Emotions) (1979), "Let's Groove" (1981)
- Cleveland Eaton
  - "Bama Boogie Woogie" (1976), "The Funky Cello" (1978)
- Electric Light Orchestra
  - "Showdown" (1973), "Sweet Talkin' Woman" (1976), "Shine A Little Love" (1979), "Last Train To London" (1979), "All Over The World" (1979)
- Yvonne Elliman
  - "(I Don't Know Why) I Keep Hangin' On" (1977), "If I Can't Have You" (1978), "Love Pains" (1979)
- Emily Starr Explosion
  - "Santiago Lover" (1978), "No No Sherif" (1979)
- The Emotions
  - "Best Of My Love" (1977), "Flowers" (1977), "I Don't Want To Lose Your Love" (1977), "Boogie Wonderland" (duet with Earth, Wind & Fire) (1979), "I Should Be Dancing" (1979)
- Eruption
  - "I Can't Stand The Rain" (1978), "One-Way Ticket" (1979)
- Gloria Estefan (with the Miami Sound Machine)
  - "Live Again" (1977), "I Want You To Love Me" (1978), "You've Broken My Heart" (1979), "Regresa A Mí" (1980), "You're All I Have" (1980), "Baila Conmigo" (1981), "Sola" (1981), "No Será Fácil" (1982), "A Toda Máquina" (1983), "Dr. Beat" (1983), "Comunicación" (1983)
- Dame Edna Everage
  - "Disco Matilda" (based around Waltzing Matilda) (1979)

== F ==
- Yvonne Fair
  - "It Should Have Been Me" (1975)
- Percy Faith
  - "Hava Nagilah" (1975), "Summer Place '76" (1976)
- Faith, Hope & Charity
  - "To Each His Own" (1975), "Don't Pity Me" (1978), "I'm Ready For A New Love" (1978)
- Joe Farrell
  - "Promise Me Your Love" (1977), "Night Dancing" (1978), "Another Star" (1978)
- Fat Larry's Band
  - "Center City" (1977), "Fascination" (1977), "Lookin' for Love" (1979), "Let the Sun Shine" (1979), "Last Chance to Dance" (1979)
- Fatback Band
  - "Do the Bus stop" (1977), "Spanish Hustle" (1976), "Disco-Crazy" (1977), "NYCNYUSA" (1978), "Mile-High" (1978), "Do the Boogie Woogie" (1979), You're My Candy Sweet" (1979)
- Wilton Felder
  - "Let's Dance Together" (1978)
- Maynard Ferguson
  - "Pagliacci" (1976), "Scheherazade" (1977), "Gonna Fly Now" (1977), "Rocky II Disco" (1979)
- Bibi Andersen
  - Call Me Lady Champagne (1980), Girls Will Be Boys (1980), Sálvame (1980), I Wanna Be Loved By You (1981), Canto (1982)
- Ferrante & Teicher
  - Classical Disco (1979)
- The Fiestas
  - "Tina, the Disco Queen" (1977)
- First Choice
  - "Armed and Extremely Dangerous" (1973), "The Player" (1974), "Dr. Love" (1977), "Let No Man Put Asunder" (1977), "Hold Your Horses" (1979)
- Roberta Flack
  - "Feel Like Makin' Love" (1977), ""Back Together Again" (1979), "Don't Make Me Wait Too Long" (1979)
- The Floaters
  - "I Just Wanna Be with You" (1978)
- Flower (Cheryl Saban)
  - "Give The Little Girl A Chance" 1978, "How" (1979), "Classical Love" (1979), "Our Never Ending Love" (1979), "Midnight Dancing" (1979)
- Four Tops
  - "Catfish" (1976), "The Show Must Go On" (1977)
- Foxy
  - "The Way You Do the Things You Do" (1976), "People Fall in Love (While Dancing)" (1977), "Teena's Song" (1978), "Get Off" (1978), "Ready For Love" (1978), "Hot Number" (1979), "Devil Boogie" (1979), "Headhunter" (1979)
- Aretha Franklin
  - "No One Could Ever Love You More" (1977), "Ladies Only" (1979), "Only Star" (1979)
- Frantique
  - "Strut Your Funky Stuff" (1979), "Disco Dancer" (1979)
- Funkadelic
  - "One Nation Under A Groove" (1978), "(Not Just) Knee Deep" (1979)

== G ==
- Juan Gabriel
  - "Nadie Baila Como Tu" (1978), "Me Gusta Bailar Contigo" (1978), "Everybody Dance In Acapulco" (1978), "El Noa Noa" (1980), "El Noa Noa II" (1984)
- Bill Gaither Trio
  - "Seek and Ye Shall Find" (1979)
- Patsy Gallant
  - "From New York to L.A." (1976), "Sugar Daddy" (1977)
- Gap Band
  - "Baby Baba Boogie" (1979), "Oops Upside Your Head" (1980), "Burn Rubber" (1981), "Outstanding" (1982), "You Dropped A Bomb On Me" (1982)
- Taana Gardner
  - "When You Touch Me" (1979), "Work That Body" (1979), "Heartbeat" (1980)
- Leif Garrett
  - "I Was Made for Dancin'" (1978), "Give In" (1979), "Moonlight Dancing" (1979), "New York City Nights" (1980)
- Gary's Gang
  - "Keep On Dancin'" (1978), "Let's Lovedance Tonight" (1979), "Knock Me Out" (1982)
- Crystal
  - "Sácame a Bailar" (1985), "Amores Sí, amores No" (1986)
- Gary Toms Empire
  - "7-6-5-4-3-2-1" (1975)
- Pearly Gates
  - "Fandango Dancing" (1979)
- Marvin Gaye
  - "Got to Give It Up" (1977), "Ego Trippin' Out" (1978), "Love Party" (1979)
- Gloria Gaynor
  - "Honey Bee" (1974), "Never Can Say Goodbye" (1974), "Reach Out (I'll Be There)" (1974), "Casanova Brown" (1975), "Most of All" (1977), "Anybody Wanna Party" (1978), "Substitute" (1978), "I Will Survive" (1978), "Let Me Know (I Have a Right)" (1979), "Tonight" (1980), "I Am What I Am" (1983)
- Andy Gibb
  - "I Just Want to Be Your Everything" (1977), "Shadow Dancing" (1978), “An Everlasting Love” (1978), “Desire” (1980)
- Gibson Brothers
  - "Symphony" (1977), "Que Sera Mi Vida (If You Should Go)" (1978), "Jenny" (1978), "Ooh What a Night" (1979), "Cuba" (1979), "Mariana" (1980)
- Gladys Knight & the Pips
  - "Baby Don't Change Your Mind" (1977), "Bourgié Bourgié" (1980)
- GQ
  - "Disco Nights (Rock-Freak)" (1979)
- Lourett Russell Grant
  - "Hot to Trot" (1979)
- Al Green
  - "Full of Fire" (1975), "Love and Happiness" (1977)
- Dave Grusin
  - "Disco Magic" (1979)
- Robert Guillaume
  - "I Who Have Nothing" (1979), "The Streets Are Filled with Dancing" (1979)

== H ==
- Marvin Hamlisch
  - "Bond '77 (James Bond Theme)" (1977)
- Herbie Hancock
  - "Cameleon" (1973), "Rock It" (1983)
- Harold Melvin & the Blue Notes
  - "The Love I Lost" (1973), "Bad Luck" (1975), "Wake Up Everybody" (1975), "Where Are All My Friends" (1975), "Don't Leave Me This Way" (1975), "Prayin'" (1979)
- Damon Harris
  - "Silk" (1978)
- Major Harris
  - "Each Morning I Wake Up" (1975)
- Dan Hartman
  - "Countdown"/"This Is It" (1978), "Instant Replay" (1978), "Relight My Fire" (1979), "Free Ride" (1979), "I Can Dream About You" (1983)
- Tony Hatch
  - "Tornado" (1976), "Ebb Tide" (1976), "Brazilia" (1976)
- Isaac Hayes
  - "Juicy Fruit (Disco Freak)" (1976), "Stranger in Paradise" (1977), "Moonlight Lovin' (Ménage à trois)" (1977), "Shaft II" (1978), "Don't Let Go" (1979)
- Heatwave
  - "Boogie Nights" (1977), "The Groove Line" (1978)
- Wayne Henderson
  - "Dancin' Love Affair" (1978), "Heat of the Beat" (1979)
- Herman Kelly and Life
  - "Dance to the Drummer's Beat" (1978)
- Patrick Hernandez
  - "Born to Be Alive" (1979), "Disco Queen" (1979)
- Martha High
  - "He's My Ding-Dong Man" (1979)
- High Inergy
  - "Shoulda Gone Dancing" (1979)
- Lawrence Hilton-Jacobs
  - "Fly Away" (1978)
- Marcia Hines
  - "Dance, You Fool, Dance" (1979)
- Loleatta Holloway
  - "Dreamin'" (1976), "Hit and Run" (1976), "Gettin' Stronger (The Longer We Stay Together)" (1976), "Ripped Off" (1976), "Run Away" (with The Salsoul Orchestra) (1977), "Catch Me on the Rebound" (1978), "I May Not Be There When You Need Me" (1978), "All About The Paper" (1979), "That's What You Said" (1979), "Love Sensation" (1980)
- Jimmy "Bo" Horne
  - "Get Happy" (1977), "Dance Across The Floor" (1978), "Spank" (1978), "Is It In" (1979)
- Hot Chocolate
  - "Disco Queen" (1974), "You Sexy Thing" (1975), "Don't Stop It Now" (1976), "Heaven's In The Backseat Of My Cadillac" (1977), "So You Win Again" (1977), "Every One's A Winner" (1978) "Are You Getting Enough Of What Makes You Happy" (1980), "Girl Crazy" (1982)
- Cissy Houston
  - "Think It Over" (1978), "Warning - Danger" (1979)
- Thelma Houston
  - "Don't Leave Me This Way" (1977), "Saturday Night, Sunday Morning" (1979), "Love Machine" (1979)
- Frankie Howerd
  - ”Mean Mr. Mustard” (1978)
- The Hues Corporation
  - "Rock the Boat" (1974), "Rockn Soul" (1974), "I Caught Your Act" (1977)
- Geraldine Hunt
  - "Hot-Blooded Woman" (1978), "Hang on to Love" (1978), "Can't Fake the Feeling" (1980)
- Leroy Hutson
  - "Unforgettable" (1979)
- Phyllis Hyman
  - "Loving You" (1977), "Kiss You All Over" (1978), "So Strange" (1978), "You Know How to Love Me" (1979), "Under Your Spell" (1979)

== I ==
- The Impressions
  - "Dance" (1977)
- Inner Life
  - "I'm Caught Up (In a One Night Love Affair)" (1979)
- Instant Funk
  - "I Got My Mind Made Up" (1978), "Crying" (1979)
- The Isley Brothers
  - "People of Today" (1976), "Who Loves You Better" (1976), "I Wanna Be With You" (1979), "Winner Takes All" (1979), "Life In The City" (1979), "It's a Disco Night (Rock Don't Stop)" (1979)

== J ==
- Paul Jabara
  - "Heaven Is a Disco" (1978), "Disco Queen" (1978), "Disco Wedding/Disco Honeymoon" (1979)
- Dee D. Jackson
  - "Man Of A Man" (1977), "Automatic Lover" (1978), "Meteor Man" (1978), "Fireball" (1979)
- Jermaine Jackson
  - "Let's Be Young Tonight" (1976), "Let's Get Serious" (1979)
- Michael Jackson
  - "Ease On down the Road" (with Diana Ross) (1978), "You Can't Win" (1979), "Don't Stop 'Til You Get Enough" (1979), "Rock with You" (1979), "Off the Wall" (1979), "Working Day and Night" (1979), "Get on the Floor" (1979), "Burn This Disco Out" (1979), "Billie Jean" (1983)
- Mick Jackson
  - "Weekend" (1978), "Blame It on the Boogie" (1978)
- Millie Jackson
  - "All-the-Way Love" (1978), "We Got to Hit It Off" (1979), "What Went Wrong Last Night" (1979)
- Walter Jackson
  - "Good to See You" (1978), "Give It Up" (1979)
- The Jackson 5
  - "Dancing Machine" (1974), "The Life of the Party" (1974), "Forever Came Today" (1975)
- The Jacksons
  - "Enjoy Yourself" (1976), "Keep on Dancing" (1976), "Show You the Way to Go" (1977), "Goin' Places" (1977), "Blame It on the Boogie" (1978), "Shake Your Body (Down to the Ground)" (1979), "Lovely One" (1980)
- Jimmy James (Jamaica, UK)
  - "Now Is the Time" (1976)
- Rick James
  - "You and I" (1978), "Sexy Lady" (1978), "Mary Jane" (1979), "17" (1979), "Super Freak" (1981), "Give It To Me Baby" (1981), "Dance Wit' Me" (1982), "Cold Blooded" (1983), "Glow" (1985)
- James & Bobby Purify
  - "Do Your Thing" (1974),
- Jean-Michel Jarre
  - "Zoolook" (1984)
- Jamiroquai
  - "Cosmic Girl" (1996), "Canned Heat" (1999), "Love Foolosophy" (2002), "Runaway" (2006)
- Morris Jefferson
  - "Spank Your Blank Blank" (1977), "Get on up and Dance" (1979)
- Jimmy Castor Bunch
  - "Bertha Butt Boogie" (1975), "KingKong" (1975)
- Elton John
  - "Philadelphia Freedom" (1975), "I Don't Want To Go On With You Like That (Shep Pettibone Remix)" (1989)
- Robert John
  - "Give a Little Bit" (1978), "Sad Eyes" (1979), "Greased Lightning" (1984)
- John Davis and the Monster Orchestra
  - "Up Jumped the Devil" (1977), "Ain't That Enough for You" (1978), "Love Magic" (1979), "That's What I Get" (1979)
- Beverly Johnson
  - "Don't Run for Cover" (1979)
- General Johnson
  - "Let's Fool Around" (1977), "Can't Nobody Love Me Like You Do" (1978)
- Sylvester Johnson
  - "Mystery Lady" (1979)
- France Joli
  - "Come To Me" (1979), "Don't Stop Dancing" (1979), "Let Go" (1979), "Playboy" (1979), "The Heart To Break The Heart" (1980), "Gonna Get Over You" (1982), "I Need Someone" (1982), "Your Good Lovin'" (1982), "Girl In The 80's" (1984)
- Gloria Jones
  - "Bring on the Love" (1977), "Woman Is Woman" (1977), "When I Was a Little Girl" (1979)
- Grace Jones
  - "Sorry" (1976), "That's The Trouble" (1976), "La Vie En Rose" (1977), "I Need A Man" (1978), "Do Or Die" (1978), "Sinning" (1979), "Saved" (1979), "Am I Ever Gonna Fall In Love" (1979), "Pull Up To The Bumper" (1981), "Slave To The Rhythm" (1985),
- Jack Jones
  - "Theme from The Love Boat" (1979)
- Quincy Jones
  - "Love, I Never Had It So Good" (1978), "Stuff Like That" (1978), "Ai No Corida" (1981), "Razzmatazz" (1981)
- Ronnie Jones
  - "Soul Sister" (1978), "The Two of Us" [duet with Claudja Barry] (1978), "Fox on the Run" (1979)
- Tamiko Jones
  - "Can’t Live Without Your Love" (1979)
- Tom Jones
  - "Don't Cry for Me Argentina" (1979)
- Patrick Juvet
  - "Ou Sont les Femmes" (1977), "I Love America" (1978), "Lady Night" (1979), "Swiss Kiss" (1979)

== K ==
- Kamahl
  - "I Just Make Believe You Love Me" (1979), "Moonlight Becomes You" (1980)
- Madleen Kane
  - "Rough Diamond" (1978), "Touch My Heart" (1978), "Let's Make Love" (1978), "Forbidden Love" (1979)
- Kat Mandu a.k.a. Lime
  - "The Break" (1979), "I Wanna Dance" (1981), "Hooked On Voices" (1987)
- KC & the Sunshine Band
  - "Sound Your Funky Horn" (1974), "Get Down Tonight" (1975), "That's The Way (I Like It)" (1975), "Boogie Shoes" (1975), "(Shake, Shake, Shake) Shake Your Booty" (1976), "I Like to Do It" (1976), "I'm Your Boogie Man" (1976), "Keep It Comin' Love" (1976), "It's The Same Old Song" (1978), "Do You Wanna Go Party" (1979), "Give It Up" (1983)
- Roberta Kelly
  - "Trouble-Maker" (1976), "I'm Sagittarius" (1977), "Love-Sign" (1977), "Sunburst" (1977), "Zodiacs Medley" (1978)
- Eddie Kendricks
  - "Keep On Truckin'" (1973), "Boogie Down" (1974)
- Chaka Khan
  - "I'm Every Woman" (1978), "Life Is a Dance" (1978), "What Cha Gonna Do for Me" (1981), "Fate" (1981), "I Feel For You" (1984)
- Ben E. King
  - "Supernatural Thing" (1975), "A Star in the Ghetto" (with Average White Band) (1977), "Music Trance" (1979)
- Carole King
  - "Disco Tech" (1978)
- Evelyn "Champagne" King
  - "Shame" (1977), "I Don't Know If It's Right" (1977), "I'm In Love" (1981), "Love Come Down" (1982)
- Fern Kinney
  - "Groove Me" (1979), "Pillow Talk" (1979), "Together We Are Beautiful" (1980)
- Kinsman Dazz a.k.a. Dazz Band
  - "Keep on Rockin'" (1979), "Let It Whip" (1982)
- Kiss
  - "I Was Made For Lovin' You" (1979)
- Eartha Kitt
  - "Where Is My Man" (1983), "I Love Men" (1984), "This Is My Life" (1986), "I Don't Care" (1986), "Arabian Song" (1987), "Sugar Daddy" (1987), "Cha Cha Heels" (With Bronski Beat) (1987)
- Kleeer
  - "Keep Your Body Working" (1978), "Tonight's the Night" (1978), "Winners" (1979), "It's Magic" (1979)
- Gladys Knight
  - "Love Is Always On Your Mind" (1977), "It's a Better-Than-Good Time" (1978), "You Bring Out the Best in Me" (1979)
- Kool & the Gang
  - "Funky Stuff" (1973), "More Funky Stuff" (1973), "Jungle Boogie" (1973), "Hollywood Swinging" (1974), "Spirit of the Boogie" (1975), "Open Sesame" (1976), "Ladies' Night" (1979), "Tonight's the Night" (1979), "Celebration" (1980), "Night People" (1980), "Steppin' Out" (1981), "Get Down on It" (1981)

== L ==
- L.A. Express
  - "Dance the Night Away" (1976)
- La Bionda
  - "Sandstorm" (1978), "One For You, One For Me" (1978), "Never Gonna Let You Go" (1979)
- Labelle
  - "Lady Marmalade" (1974), "What Can I Do for You" (1974), "Messin' with My Mind" (1975), "Get You Somebody New" (1976)
- Patti LaBelle
  - "Eyes in the Back of My Head" (1978), "Music Is My Way of Life" (1979), "Ain't That Enough" (1980), "Release" (1980), "Give It Up (The Dawning Of Rejection)" (1980), "Stir It Up" (1984), "New Attitude" (1984)
- Cheryl Ladd
  - "Skinny-dippin'" (1978), "Missing You" (1979), "Dance Forever" (1979)
- Cherry Laine
  - "Catch The Cat" (1978), "Night In Chicago" (1978), "Sea Farewalk" (1978)
- Lakeside
  - "Fantastic Voyage" (1980)
- Major Lance
  - "Love Pains" (1978)
- Nicolette Larson
  - "Lotta Love" (1978)
- D.C. LaRue
  - "Cathedrals" (1976), "Face of Love" (1977), "Let Them Dance" (1978), "Do You Want The Real Thing" (1978), "Hot Jungle Drums and Voodoo Rhythm" (1979)
- Stacy Lattisaw
  - "When You're Young and in Love" (1979), "Jump to the Beat" (1980)
- Fabián Lavalle "Fabiruchis"
  - Sin amor (1980)
- Bettye LaVette
  - "Doin' the Best That I Can" (1979)
- Amanda Lear
  - "Blood and Honey" (1976), "Queen Of China-Town" (1977), "Enigma (Give A Bit Of Mmh To Me)" (1978), "Follow Me" (1978), "Fashion Pack (Studio 54)" (1979), "Lilli Marlene" (1979), "Diamonds" (1980), "Fever" (1982)
- Laura Lee
  - "Sat-Is-Fac-Tion" (1979)
- Ranee Lee
  - "Disco Man" (1979)
- Rita Lee
  - "Lança Perfume" (1980)
- Peter Lemongello
  - "Can't Get You Off My Mind" (1976)
- Ramsey Lewis
  - "Aquarius/Let the Sun Shine In" (1979), "Dancin'" (1979)
- Webster Lewis
  - "Do It with Style" (1977), "You Deserve to Dance" (1979)
- Lipps Inc.
  - "Funkytown" (1979), "Rock It" (1979), "All Night Dancin'" (1979), "How Long" (1980), "Addicted To The Night" (1983)
- Liquid Gold
  - "My Baby's Baby" (1978), "Dance Yourself Dizzy" (1979), "Substitute" (1980), "The Night, The Wine & The Roses" (1980), "Don't Panic" (1981)
- Logg
  - "I Know You Will" (1981)
- Trini Lopez
  - "Helplessly" (1978)
- Mary Love
  - "Dance to My Music" (1979)
- Love And Kisses
  - "I Found Love (Now That I Found You)" (1977), "Accidental Lover" (1977), "Thank God It's Friday" (1978), "How Much, How Much I Love You" (1979)
- Love De-Luxe
  - "Here Comes That Sound Again" (1978)
- Love Unlimited Orchestra
  - "Love's Theme" (1973), "Satin Soul" (1974), "My Sweet Summer Suite" (1976), Brazilian Love Song (1976), "Theme from King Kong" (1977), "Bring It on Up" (1975), "Don't You Know How Much I Love You" (1978), "High-Steppin' Hip-Dressin' Fella" (1979), "Welcome Aboard" (1981)
- L.T.D.
  - "(Every Time I Turn Around) Back in Love Again" (1977), "Kickin' Back" (1981)
- Carrie Lucas
  - "I Gotta Keep Dancing" (1977), "Street-Corner Symphony" (1978), "Dance with You" (1979), "Are You Dancing" (1979)
- Lucero
  - "Él" (1982), "Te Prometo" (1982), "Viernes" (1982), "Secundaria" (1982), "Hola Amigos del Espacio" (1982), "Amárralo" (1982), "la la la Cómo Te Quiero " (1982), "Amigas" (1982), "Los Reyes Magos" (1982), "Contigo" (1984), "Refresco para dos" (1988), "Vete con Ella" (1988), "Hojas Secas" (1989)
- Lulu
  - "I Could Never Miss You (More Than I Do)" (1979)
- Cheryl Lynn
  - "Got To Be Real" (1978), "Star Love" (1979), "Keep It Hot" (1979), "Shake It Up Tonight" (1980), "Encore" (1981)
- Vera Lynn
  - "Thank You for the Music" (1979)

== M ==
- Ralph MacDonald
  - "Where Is the Love" (1977), "The Path" (1978), "Discolypso" (1979)
- Mandrill
  - "Stay Tonite" (1978)
- Barry Manilow
  - "It's a Miracle" (1975), "Copacabana (At The Copa)" (1978)
- Herbie Mann
  - "Highjack" (1975), "Waterbed" (1976), "The Piper" (1977), "Jisco Dazz" (1978), "Body Oil" (1979), "Superman" (1979)
- Mao Zedong
  - "The East Is Red" (1992), "Red Sun in the Sky" (1992), "Long Live Comrade Mao for Ten Thousand Years" (1992)
- Kelly Marie
  - "Make Love To Me" (1978), "Run to Me" (1979), "Feels Like I'm In Love" (1980), "Loving Just for Fun" (1980), "Don't Stop Your Love" (1981), "Head For The Stars" (1981), "Hot Love" (1981), "Love Trial" (1981), "New York At Night" (1981), "Do You Like It Like That" (1981), "I'm On Fire (1983), "Breakout" (1984)
- Teena Marie
  - "I'm a Sucker for Your Love" (duet with Rick James) (1979), "Behind the Groove" (1980), "I Need Your Lovin'" (1980), "Square Biz" (1981), "It Must be Magic" (1981)
- Chuck Mangione
  - "Feels So Good" (1977)
- Gap Mangione
  - "Dancin' Is Makin' Love" (1979), "You're the One" (1979)
- Al Martino
  - "Volare" (1975), "My Thrill" (1976)
- Barbara Mason
  - "Love Song" (duet with Bunny Sigler) (1979)
- Harvey Mason
  - "Groovin' You" (1979)
- Johnny Mathis
  - "Night and Day" (1978), "Begin the Beguine" (1979)
- Paul Mauriat and his Orchestra
  - "Love Is Still Blue" (1976), "The Joy of You" (1978), "Overseas Call" (1978)
- Curtis Mayfield
  - "No Goodbyes" (1978), "Tell Me, Tell Me (How Ya Like to Be Loved)" (1979), "Tripin' Out" (1980)
- Janice McClain
  - "Smack Dab in the Middle" (1979)
- Van McCoy
  - "The Hustle" (1975), "Rhythms of the World" (1976), "Disco Movies" (1978), "Lonely Dancer" (1979), "The Hustle II" (1979)
- George McCrae
  - "Rock Your Baby" (1974), "Honey I (I'll Live My Life For You)" (1975), "Givin' Back the Feeling" (1977), "Love in Motion" (1977), "Let's Dance (People All over the World)" (1978), "(You've Got) My Love, My Life, My Soul" (1978)
- Gwen McCrae
  - "Rockin' Chair" (1975), "I Found a Love" (1979), "Melody of Life" (1979), "Funky Sensation" (1981), "Keep The Fire Burning" (1982)
- McFadden and Whitehead
  - "Ain't No Stoppin' Us Now" (1979), "Do You Want to Dance" (1979)
- Maureen McGovern
  - "Different Worlds (Theme from Angie)" (1979), "Can't Take My Eyes off You" (1979), "I'm Happy Just to Dance with You" (1979)
- Jimmy McGriff
  - "Sky Hawk" (1978), "Tailgunner" (1978)
- Sérgio Mendes
  - "I'll Tell You" (1978)
- Lucía Méndez
  - "Qué Clase de Hombre Eres Tú?" (1982), "Don't Tell My Mama" (1982), "Yo Necesito Más Amor" (1985), "La Ola Del Amor" (1985), "Castígame" (1986), "Tormenta de Verano" (1989)
- The Meters
  - "Disco Is the Thing Today" (1976)
- MFSB
  - "T.S.O.P. (The Sound of Philadelphia)" (1974), "Sexy" (1975), "T.L.C. (Tender Lovin' Care)" (1975), "K-Jee" (1975)
- Miami Sound Machine
  - "I Want You to Love Me" (1978), "You've Broken My Heart" (1979)
- Michael Zager Band
  - "This Is the Life" (1975), "Let's All Chant" (1978), "Music Fever" (1978), "You Don't Know a Good Thing" (1978), "Life's a Party" (1979)
- Michele (Chantal Curtis)
  - "Magic Love" (1977), "Disco Dance" (1977), "Can't You Feel It" (1977)
- Tony Middleton
  - "Lady Fingers" (1976)
- Bette Midler
  - "Strangers in the Night" (1976), "Hang On In There Baby" (1979), "My Knight In Black Leather" (1979), "Married Men" (1979), "Big Noise From Winnetka" (1979), "Hurricane" (1979)
- Luis Miguel
  - "1+2=2 Enamorados" (1981), "Mentira" (1982), "Amor de Escuela" (1982), "Tomemos Los Patines" (1982), "Directo Al Corazón " (1982), "Lo Leí En Tu Diario" (1982), "Decídete" (1983), "Bandido Cupido" (1983), "Safari" (1983), "Campeón" (1983), "En Japón" (1983), "El Brujo" (1983), "Soy como Soy" (1984), "Lupe" (1984), "Fiebre de Amor" (1985), "Será Que No Me Amas" (1990)
- Midnight Star
  - "Operator" (1984)
- Mighty Clouds of Joy
  - "Mighty High" (1976)
- Roger Miller
  - "Disco Man" (1979)
- Stephanie Mills
  - "What Cha Gonna Do With My Lovin'?" (1979), "Put Your Body In It" (1979), "You Can Get Over" (1979), "Never Knew Love Like This Before" (1980), "Sweet Sensation" (1980), "Two Hearts" (with Teddy Pendergrass) (1981)
- Garnett Mimms
  - "What It Is" (1977)
- Liza Minnelli
  - "Losing My Mind" (1989) with Pet Shop Boys
- The Miracles
  - "Love Machine" (1975)
- Meco Monardo (billed as "Meco")
  - "Star Wars Theme/Cantina Band" (1977), "Themes from The Wizard of Oz: Over the Rainbow/We're Off to See the Wizard" (1978), "Star Trek Medley" (1979), "Love Theme from Superman" (1979)
- The Monotones
  - "Mono" (1979), "Zero To Zero" (1980)
- Dorothy Moore
  - "Let the Music Play" (1978)
- Jackie Moore
  - "This Time Baby" (1979), "How's Your Love-Life Baby" (1979)
- Melba Moore
  - "This Is It" (1976), "Good Love Makes Everything Alright" (1977), "You Stepped into My Life" (1978), "Pick Me Up, I'll Dance" (1978), "Night People" (1979), "I Don't Want To Lose Your Love" (1979), "If You Believe In Love" (1979)
- Giorgio Moroder
- Mother's Finest
  - "Dis Go Dis Way, Dis Go Dat Way" (1977)
- Moulin Rouge
  - "To Love Somebody" (1979)
- Idris Muhammad
  - "Could Heaven Ever Be Like This" (1977), "Dancing in the Land of Lovely Ladies" (1978), "Disco Man" (1979)
- The Muppets
  - "Movin' Right Along" (1979)
- Walter Murphy
  - "A Fifth of Beethoven" (1976), "Rhapsody in Blue" (1977), "Gentle Explosion" (1978), "Mostly Mozart" (1979), "Classical Dancing" (1979)
- Musique
  - "In the Bush" (1978), "Keep On Jumpin'" (1978), "Summer Love" (1978), "Number One" (1979)

== N ==
- Jeanne Napoli
  - "Oh, No, Don't Let Go" (1976)
- Johnny Nash
  - "Closer" (1979)
- David Naughton
  - "Makin' It" (1979)
- New Birth
  - "Deeper" (1977)
- Olivia Newton-John
  - "Deeper Than The Night" (1979), "Xanadu" (1980), "Magic" (1980), "Physical" (1981)
- Paul Nicholas
  - "Reggae Like It used To Be" (1976), "Dancing With The Captain" (1976), "Grandma's Party" (1976), "Heaven On The 7th Floor" (1977), "Black Daddy" (1977)
- Billy Nichols
  - "Give Your Body up to the Music" (1979)
- Nick Straker Band
  - "A Little Bit Of Jazz" (1980), "A Walk In The Park" (1980), "Leaving On The Midnight Train" (1980)
- Maxine Nightingale
  - "Right Back Where We Started From" (1975), "Gotta Be The One" (1976), "Hideaway" (1979)
- Noël
  - Dancing Is Dangerous (1979)
- The Nolans
  - "I'm In The Mood For Dancing" (1979), "Don't Make Waves" (1980), "Gotta Pull Myself Together" (1980), "Attention To Me" (1980), "Who's Gonna Rock You" (1981), "Chemistry" (1981), "Don't Love Me Too Hard" (1982), "Crashing Down" (1983)
- Patrick Norman (Canadian musician)
  - "Loving You" (1977), Let's Try Once Again" (1977)

== O ==
- Rim Kwaku Obeng
  - "Rim Arrives" (1980), "Too Tough / I'm Not Going To Let You Go" (1982)
- Billy Ocean
  - "Love Really Hurts Without You" (1976), "Red Light Spells Danger" (1977), "Are You Ready" (1980), "Nights (Feel Like Gettin' Down)" (1981), "Caribbean Queen" (1983), "Love Zone" (1984)
- Odyssey
  - "Native New Yorker" (1977), "Single Again/What Time Does the Balloon Go Up" (1978), Lucky Star (1978), "Use It Up, Wear It Out" (1980), "Going Back to My Roots" (1981), "Inside Out" (1982)
- The Ohio Players
  - "Skin Tight" (1974), "Fire" (1974), "Love Rollercoaster" (1976)
- The O'Jays
  - "Back Stabbers" (1972), "992 Arguments" (1973), "Love Train" (1973), "Livin' For The Weekend" (1975), "I Love Music" (1976), "Message In Our Music" (1976), "Work On Me" (1977), "Darlin Darlin Baby" (1978), "Usta Be My Girl" (1978), "Strokey Stroke" (1978), "Get On Out and Party" (1979)
- The Olympic Runners
  - "Keep It Up" (1977), "The Kool Gent" (1978), "Sir Dancealot" (1979)
- One Way
  - "Music" (1979), "Cutie Pie" (1981), "Mr. Groove" (1984), "Don't Think About It" (1987), "You Better Quit" (1987)
- Yoko Ono
  - "Walking On Thin Ice" (1981)
- Yukiko Okada
  - "Walking in the Moonlight" (1985), "Lady Joker" (1985), "Anara Wo Wasureru Ga Areba" (1985), "Summer Beach" (1985), "Hoshi to Yoru to Koibitobachi" (1985)
- The Originals
  - "Down to Love Town" (1976)
- Bobby Orlando
  - "She Has A Way" (1982), "I'm So Hot For You" (1982), "Reputation" (1983), "Suspicious Minds" (1984), "Givin' Up" (1984)
- Tony Orlando & Dawn
  - "Look In My Eyes Pretty Woman" (1975), "Here Comes The Spring" (1975)
- Tony Orlando
  - "Don't Let Go" (1978), "They're Playing Our Song" (1979)
- Osmonds
  - "I, I, I" (1978)
- Ottawan
  - "D.I.S.C.O." (1979), "Hands Up" (1981)

== P ==
- Gene Page
  - "Wild Cherry" (1976), "Close Encounters" (1978)
- Jeree Palmer
  - "Late Night Surrender" (1979)
- Paradise Birds
  - "I Am A Song" (1978)
- Dennis Parker (Wade Nichols)
  - "Like An Eagle" (1979), "New York By Night" (1979)
- Parliament
  - "Up for the Downstroke" (1974), "Give Up The Funk" (1976), "Flashlight" (1977)
- Passion
  - "Don't Bring Back Memories" (1980), "In New York" (1980)
- Billy Paul
  - "Your Song" (1972), "Let' Em In" (1976), "We All Got A Mission" (1976), "How Good Is Your Game" (1976), "Only The Strong Survive" (1977),"False Faces" (1979), "Bring the Family Back" (1979)
- Paul McCartney & Wings
  - "Silly Love Songs" (1976), "Goodnight Tonight" (1979), "Comin' Up"(1980)
- Freda Payne
  - "Love Magnet" (1977), "Livin' For The Beat" (1978), "Happy Days Are Here Again/Happy Music" (1978), "Red Hot" (1979), I'll Do Anything for You" (1979)
- Peaches & Herb
  - "Shake Your Groove Thing" (1978), "Roller-Skatin' Mate" (1978), "Howzabout Some Love" (1979), "Gettin' Down, Gettin' Down" (1979), "(I Want Us) Back Together" (1979), "Fun Time" (1980), "Dream Come True" (1981)
- David Peaston
  - "Two Wrongs" (1989)
- Lana Pellay
  - "Pistol In My Pocket" (1985)
- Teddy Pendergrass
  - "I Don't Love You Anymore" (1977), "The More I Get, The More I Want" (1977), "Get Up, Get Down, Get Funky, Get Loose" (1978)
- Barbara Pennington
  - "24 Hours a Day" (1977), "You Are the Music within Me" (1978)
- People's Choice
  - "Do It Any Way You Wanna" (1975), "Movin' in All Directions" (1976)
- Houston Person (Jazz, disco)
  - "Disco Sax" (1975), "Dancing Feet" (1976)
- Elvis Presley
  - "Moody Blue" (1976)
- The Persuaders
  - "Two Women" (1976)
- Peter Jacques Band
  - "Fire Night Dance" (1979), "Walking on Music" (1979), "Fly With The Wind" (1979), "Devil's Run" (1979), "Exotically" (1980), "Counting On Love" (1980), "Drives Me Crazy" (1985)
- Esther Phillips
  - "What a Diff'rence a Day Makes" (1976), "Our Day Will Come" (1978)
- Wilson Pickett
  - "Love Will Keep Us Together" (1976), "Love Dagger" (1977), "Time To Let The Sun Shine On Me" (1977), "Who Turned You On" (1978), "Dance You Down" (1978), "Groovin'" (1978), "I Want You" (1979), "Love Of My Life" (1979)
- Pink Lady
  - "Kiss In The Dark" (1979), "Walk Away Renee" (1979), "Monday Mona Lisa Club" (1979)
- The Players Association
  - "Love Hangover" (1977), "Disco Inferno" (1977), "Going to the Disco" (1978), "Turn the Music Up!" (1979)
- Bonnie Pointer
  - "I Can't Help Myself (Sugar Pie Honey Bunch)" (1978), "Free Me From My Freedom" (1979), "Heaven Must Have Sent You" (1979)
- Noel Pointer
  - "For You (A Disco Concerto)" (1979)
- Pointer Sisters
  - "Yes We Can Can" (1973), "How Long" (1973), "Happiness" (1978), "Slow Hand" (1978), "He's So Shy" (1980), "We've Got The Power" (1980), "I'm So Excited" (1982), "Dance Electric" (1982), "Jump (For My Love)" (1983), "Automatic" (1984)
- Michel Polnareff
  - "Lipstick" (1978)
- Billy Preston
  - "Go for It" (duet with Syreeta) (1978), "Disco Dancin'" (1978), "Give It Up, Hot" (1979), "Just for You" (1981)
- Charley Pride
  - "Never Been So Loved (In All My Life)" (1981)
- Prince
  - "Just as Long as We're Together" (1978), "I Wanna Be Your Lover" (1979), "Sexy Dancer" (1980), "Uptown" (1980), "Controversy" (1981), "1999" (1982)
- Arthur Prysock
  - "When Love Is New" (1976)
- Pussyfoot
  - "The Way That You Do It" (1976), "Ooh Ja Ja" (1977), "Got To Move On" (1978), "It's Alright" (1978)
- Asha Puthli (India, USA)
  - "Latin Lover" (1978), "Peek-A-Boo Boogie" (1978), "I'm Gonna Dance" (1979), "Music Machine (Dedication to Studio 54)" (1979)

== Q ==
- Stacey Q
  - "Two Of Hearts" (1986)
- Queen
  - "Another One Bites The Dust" (1980), "Staying Power" (1982), "Body Language" (1982), "Calling All Girls" (1982)
- The Quick
  - "Sharks Are Cool, Jets Are Hot" (1979), "Hip, Shake, Jerk" (1980), "Young Men Drive Fast" (1980), "Zulu" (1981), "Rhythm of the Jungle" (1982)

== R ==
- The Raes
  - "Que Sera Sera" (1977), "A Little Lovin' (Keeps the Doctor Away)" (1978), "School" (1978), "(I Only Wanna) Get Up and Dance" (1979)
- Rahni Harris & F.L.O.
  - "Six Million Steps (West Runs South)" (1978)
- Lou Rawls
  - "You'll Never Find Another Love Like Mine" (1976), "See You When I Git There" (1977), "Let Me Be Good to You" (1979)
- Ray, Goodman & Brown
  - "Thrill/Friends" (1979)
- Raydio
  - "Jack and Jill" (1978), "Get Down" (1978), "More Than One Way To Love A Woman" (1979), "It's Time To Party Now" (1980), "It's Your Night" (1981),
- The Real Thing
  - "You to Me Are Everything" (1976)
- Sharon Redd
  - "Love Insurance" (1979), "Can You Handle It" (1980), "In the Name of Love" (1982), "Beat the Street" (1982), "Never Give You Up" (1982), "You're the One" (1982), "Send Your Love" (1982), "Love How You Feel" (1983), "Somebody Saves the Night" (1983), "You're a Winner" (1983)
- Helen Reddy
  - "Make Love to Me" (1979)
- Martha Reeves
  - "Love Don't Come No Stronger" (1978), "Skating in the Streets (Dancing in the Streets)" (1979)
- Clarence Reid
  - "You Get Me Up" (1979)
- Regina Richards
  - "Baby Love" (1986)
- Rhythm Heritage
  - "Theme from S.W.A.T." (1976), "Baretta's Theme (Keep Your Eye on the Sparrow)" (1977), "Sail away with Me" (1977), "Disco Queen" (1978), "Lifeline" (1979), "Disco House" (1979), "Do You Make Love Like You Dance?" (1979)
- Rick Dees & His Cast of Idiots
  - "Disco Duck" (1976), "Dr. Disco" (1977), "Dis-gorilla" (1977), "You Got Those Lips" (1978)
- Minnie Riperton
  - "Stick Together" (1977), "Here We Go" (1979), "Dancin' and Actin' Crazy" (1979)
- Ripple
  - "The Beat Goes On" (1977)
- The Ritchie Family
  - "I Want to Dance with You (Dance with Me)" (1975), "Brazil" (1975), "The Best Disco In Town" (1976), "Arabian Nights (Medley)" (1976), "Life Is Music" (1977), "African Queens" (1977), "American Generation" (1978), "Put Your Feet to the Beat" (1979)
- Johnny Rivers
  - "Slow Dancin' (Swayin' To The Music)" (1977), "Curious Mind (Um, Um, Um, Um, Um, Um)" (1978)
- Vicki Sue Robinson
  - "Turn the Beat Around" (1976), "Never Gonna Let You Go" (1976), "Let the Sun Shine In" (1977), "Hold Tight" (1977), "Daylight" (1978), "Feels So Good It Must Be Wrong" (1979), "To Sir With Love" (1983)
- Kenny Rogers
  - "You Turn The Light On" (1979)
- The Rolling Stones
  - "Miss You" (1978), "Emotional Rescue" (1980)
- Sonny Rollins
  - "Disco Monk" (1979)
- Daniela Romo
  - "Mentiras" (1983), "Celos" (1983), "Pobre Secretaria" (1983), "La ocasión para amarnos" (1983), "Ven a mi fiesta" (1983), "Yo no Te Pido La Luna" (1984), "Ya No Somos Amantes" (1984), "Coco Loco" (1986), "Veneno para Dos" (1986), "Gitana" (1987), "El poder del amor" (1987)
- Rose Royce
  - "Car Wash" (1976), "It Makes You Feel Like Dancin'" (1977), "Do Your Dance" (1977), "Is It Love You're After" (1979), "Lock It Down" (1979)
- Diana Ross
  - "Love Hangover" (1976), "The Boss" (1979), "Upside Down" (1980), "My Old Piano" (1980), "I'm Coming Out" (1980)
- Rouge(Female group)
  - "Don't Stop Singing" (1978)
- Round One
  - "In Zaire" (1985), "On Top" (1985)
- Roundtree(Richard Roundtree)
  - "Get on Up" (1979), "Discocide" (1979)
- Roxy Music
  - "Love Is The Drug" (1975), "Angel Eyes" (1979)
- David Ruffin
  - "Love Can Be Hazardous to Your Health" (1975), "Fallin' in Love with You" (1977), "Sexy Dancer" (1979), "Let Your Love Rain Down On Me", (1979)
- Merrilee Rush
  - "Save Me" (1977), "You" (1977)
- Patrice Rushen
  - "Haven't You Heard" (1979), "Look Up" (1980), "Never Gonna Give You Up" (1980), "Don't Blame Me" (1980), "Forget Me Nots" (1982)

== S ==
- Saint Tropez
  - "On A Rien A Perdre" (1977), "Hold on to Love" (1978), "Fill My Life with Love" (1978), "One More Minute" (1979)
- The Salsoul Orchestra
  - "Tangerine" (1975), "Nice 'n' Naasty" (1976), "You're Just the Right Size" (1976), "Chicago Bus Stop (Ooh, I Love It)" (1976), "Christmas Medley" (1976), "Run Away" (1977)
- Queen Samantha
  - "The Letter" (1978), "Close Your Eyes" (1979), "Take a Chance" (1979)
- Samantha Sang
  - "Emotion" (1978), "You Keep Me Dancing" (1978), "From Dance To Love" (1979)
- Véronique Sanson
  - "Bernard's Song (Il N'est De Nulle Part)" (1977)
- Santa Esmeralda
  - "Don't Let Me Be Misunderstood" (1977), "Sevilla Nights" (1977), "Another Cha-Cha" (1978)
- Santana
  - "One Chain (Don't Make No Prison)" (1978)
- Sarah Brightman & Hot Gossip
  - "I Lost My Heart To A Starship Trooper" (1978), "Adventures Of The Love Crusader" (1979)
- Leo Sayer
  - "You Make Me Feel Like Dancing" (1977), "Thunder in My Heart" (1978)
- Boz Scaggs
  - "What Can I Say?" (1976), "Lowdown" (1976), "Hollywood" (1977), "Hard Times" (1977), "Jo Jo" (1980), "Simone" (1980), "Miss Sun" (1980)
- Harvey Scales
  - "Follow the Disco Crowd" (1977), "Hot Foot" (1979)
- Lalo Schifrin
  - "Enter The Dragon" (1973), "Ape Shuffle" (1974)
- Gloria Scott
  - "Just as Long as We're Together" (1975)
- Ambros Seelos
  - "Gimme More" (1979)
- Selena
  - Disco Medley (1995)
- Shalamar
  - "The Second Time Around" (1979), "A Night To Remember (1982), "There It Is" (1982), "I Can Make You Feel Good" (1982), "Dancing In The Sheets" (1984)
- Marlena Shaw
  - "It's Better Than Walkin' Out" (1976), "Love Dancin'" (1979), "Touch Me in the Morning" (1979)
- Sheila and B. Devotion
  - "Spacer" (1979)
- Shirley & Company
  - "Shame, Shame, Shame" (1974)
- Bunny Sigler
  - "By the Way You Dance" (1978), "Love Song" (duet with Barbara Mason) (1979)
- Silver Convention
  - "Fly Robin Fly" (1975), "Get Up and Boogie" (1976)
- Bebu Silvetti (Silvetti)
  - "Primitive Man" (1976), "Spring Rain" (1977), "Sun after the Rain" (1978)
- Joe Simon
  - "Get Down, Get Down (Get On The Floor)" (1975), "Love Vibration" (1978), "Going Through These Changes" (1978), "One Step at a Time" (1978), "Happy Birthday, Baby" (1979)
- Lowrell Simon (Lost Generation)
  - "Mellow, Mellow Right On" (1978), "Overdose of Love" (1979)
- Sylvia Sims
  - "Teach Me Tonight" (1978), "Sweet Georgia Brown" (1978), "When it Was Done" (1978), "It Had to Be You" (1978)
- Julie Sitruk (Chantal Curtis)
  - "Un Païs Tropical" (1978)
- Sister Sledge
  - "He's The Greatest Dancer" (1979), "We Are Family" (1979), "Thinking Of You" (1978), "Lost In Music" (1979), "Got To Love Somebody" (1979), "All American Girls" (1981)
- Skyy
  - "First Time Around" (1979), "Disco Dancing" (1979), "Call Me" (1982)
- Slave
  - "Slide" (1977), "Stellar Fungk" (1978), "Just A Touch Of Love" (1979), "Watching You" (1980)
- Percy Sledge
  - "When She's Touching Me" (1977)
- O.C. Smith
  - "You Thrill Me" (1979)
- Gino Soccio
  - "Dance to Dance" (1979), "Dancer" (1979), "Try It Out" (1981)
- Sophisticated Ladies
  - "Check It Out" (1977)
- S.O.S. Band
  - "Take Your Time (Do It Right)" (1980), "Just Be Good To Me" (1983), "Finest" (1986), "Borrowed Love" (1986), "Sands Of Time" (1986)
- David Soul
  - "Silver Lady" (1977)
- Soul Children
  - "Summer in the Shade" (1978)
- Soul Survivors
  - "Tonight's The Night" (1975), "Happy Birthday, America" (1976), "Right Here Right Now" (1977)
- Soul Train Gang
  - "Soul Train Theme" (1976), "Ooh Cha Cha" (1976), "My Cherie Amour" (1977)
- Space(France)
  - "Carry on, Turn Me On" (1977), "Magic Fly" (1977), "Deliverance" (1978)
- The Spinners
  - "Rubberband Man" (1976), "Love or Leave" (1975), "H.E.L.P." (1978), "Working My Way Back to You/Forgive Me Girl" (1979), "Disco Ride" (1979), "Cupid/I've Loved You For A Long Time" (1980)
- King Sporty(Jamaica)
  - "Keep on Dancing" (1977), "Fire Keep on Burning" (1978)
- Dusty Springfield
  - "Living Without Your Love" (1979), "Save Me, Save Me" (1979)
- Pamala Stanley
  - "This Is Hot" (1979), "All I Wanna Do Is Dance" (1979), "Hey Mr. Magic" (1979), "I Don't Want To Talk About It" (1983), "If Looks Could Kill" (1983), "Coming Out Of Hiding" (1984)
- Mavis Staples
  - "Tonight I Feel Like Dancing" (1979)
- Stargard
  - "Disco Rufus" (1978), "Which Way Is Up" (1978), "Wear It Out" (1979)
- Edwin Starr
  - "Contact" (1978), "H.A.P.P.Y. Radio" (1979)
- Ringo Starr
  - "Drowning in the Sea of Love" (1977), "Just A Dream" (1977), “Where Did Our Love Go” (1978)
- Candi Staton
  - "Young Hearts Run Free" (1976), "Nights On Broadway" (1977), "Victim" (1978), "Honest I Do Love You" (1978), "When You Wake up Tomorrow" (1979), "Suspicious Minds" (1982)
- Steely Dan
  - "Peg" (1977), "Home At Last" (1978), "Josie" (1978), "FM (No Static at All)", (1978), "Hey Nineteen" (1980)
- Amii Stewart
  - "Knock On Wood" (1979), "Light My Fire/137 Disco Heaven" (1979), "Jealousy" (1979), "The Letter" (1979), "The Winner Takes All" (1979), "Step Into The Love Line" (1979), "Great Balls Of Fire" (1982), "Where Did Our Love Go" (1982), "Working Late Tonight" (1983), "Friends" (1985), "Stand" (1986), "Time Is Tight" (1986), "So Shy" (1992), "I Can't Give Up" (1992)
- Rod Stewart
  - "Do Ya Think I'm Sexy?" (1978)
- Tommy Stewart (trumpeter)
  - "Bump And Hustle Music" (1976)
- Street People
  - "Never Get Enough of Your Love" (1976), "Liberated Lady" (1977)
- Barbra Streisand
  - "Shake Me, Wake Me (When It's Over)" (1975), "The Main Event/Fight" (1979), "No More Tears (Enough Is Enough)" (duet with Donna Summer) (1979)
- The Stylistics
  - "Rockin' Roll Baby" (1973), "I Can't Give You Anything (But My Love) (1975), "Love Is The Answer" (1979), "Disco Baby" (1975), "Sixteen Bars" (1976), "Lucky Me" (1977), "The Lion Sleeps Tonight" (1978), "You're The Best Thing In My Life" (1978), "One-Night Affair" (1979), "Fly!" (1979)
- Sunny
  - "Doctor's Orders" (1974)
- Donna Summer
  - "Love To Love You Baby" (1975), "Could It Be Magic?" (1976), "Try Me, I Know We Can Make It" (1976), "I Feel Love" (1977), "Loves Unkind" (1977), "Now I Need You" (1977), "Working The Midnight Shift", (1977), "Down Deep Inside" (1977), "I Love You" (1977), "Last Dance" (1978), "With Your Love" (1978), "MacArthur Park" (1978), "One Of A Kind" (1978), "Hot Stuff" (1979), "Bad Girls" (1979), "Our Love" (1979), "Sunset People" (1979), "Heaven Knows" (1979), "Dim All The Lights" (1979), "No More Tears (Enough Is Enough)" (Duet with Barbra Streisand) (1979), "On The Radio" (1980), "Love Is In Control (Finger On The Trigger)" (1982), "She Works Hard for the Money" (1983), "This Time I Know It's for Real" (1989)
- Sunshine (USA)
  - "Take It to the Zoo" (1978)
- The Supremes
  - "He's My Man" (1975), "I'm Gonna Let My Heart Do the Walking" (1976), "High Energy" (1976)
- The Sylvers
  - "Boogie Fever" (1975), "Hot Line" (1976), "High School Dance" (1976), "Don't Stop, Get Off" (1978)
- Sylvester
  - "Down, Down, Down" (1977), "Over and Over" (1977), "Dance (Disco Heat)" (1978), "You Make Me Feel (Mighty Real)" (1978), "I (Who Have Nothing)" (1979), "Can't Stop Dancing" (1979), "Stars" (1979), "Sell My Soul" (1980), "I'll Dance To That" (1980), "I Need You" (1980), "Fever" (1980), "Can't You See" (1981), "Do Ya Wanna Funk" (1982), "Menergy" (1982), "Trouble In Paradise" (1983), "Hard Up" (1983), "Call Me" (1983), "Don't Stop" (1983), "Take Me To Heaven" (1983), "Be With You" (1983), "Taking Love Into My Own Hands" (1983), "Lovin' Is Really My Game" (1983), "Living For The City" (1986), "Someone Like You" (1986)
- Sylvia
  - "Pillow Talk" (1973), "The Lollipop Man" (1977), "Automatic Lover" (1977)
- Syreeta
  - "One to One" (1977), "Loving You" (with Donald Byrd) (1979)

== T ==
- T-Connection
  - "Disco Magic" (1976), "Do What Ya Wanna Do" (1977), "Let Yourself Go" (1978), "Saturday Night" (1979), "At Midnight" (1979)
- A Taste of Honey
  - "Boogie Oogie Oogie" (1978), "Disco Dancin'" (1978), "Do It Good" (1979), "Take The Boogae (Or Leave It)" (1979), "Rescue Me" (1980), "She's A Dancer" (1980)
- Tavares
  - "It Only Takes A Minute" (1975), "Heaven Must Be Missing An Angel" (1976), "Don't Take Away The Music" (1976), "Whodunnit" (1977), "More Than A Woman" (1978), "Slow Train to Paradise" (1978)
- Johnnie Taylor
  - "Disco Lady" (1976), "Love is Better in the AM" (1977), "Disco 9000" (1977), "Keep on Dancing" (1978), "Mister Melody-Maker" (1979)
- Laura Taylor (Brazil)
  - "Dancin' in My Feet" (1978), "All Through Me" (1978), "Some Love" (1978), "Lady Scorpio" (1978)
- Ted Taylor
  - "Ghetto Disco" (1977), "Keepin' My Head above Water" (1979)
- Telex
  - "Moskow Diskow" (1979), "Twist à Saint Tropez" (1979), "Euro-Vision" (1980), "L'amour Toujours (1984)
- The Temprees
  - "I Found Love on a Disco Floor" (1976)
- Joe Tex
  - "Ain't Gonna Bump No More (With No Big Fat Woman)" (1977)
- Evelyn Thomas
  - "I Wanna Make It on My Own" (1978), "Love In The First Degree" (1979), "High Energy" (1984), "Masquerade" (1984)
- Tasha Thomas
  - "Hot-Buttered Boogie" (1979)
- Timmy Thomas
  - "Touch to Touch" (1977), "Stone to the Bone" (1978), "Freak in, Freak Out" (1978)
- Linda G. Thompson (Silver Convention)
  - "Ooh, What A Night" (1974), "Flight To Fantasy" (1980)
- Three Degrees
  - "Dirty Old Man" (1973), "When Will I See You Again" (1974), "Take Good Care Of Yourself" (1975), "Giving Up Giving In" (1978), "Woman In Love" (1978), "The Runner" (1979), "The Golden Lady" (1979), "Jump The Gun" (1979), "My Simple Heart" (1979), "Hot Summer Night" (1979)
- Harry Thumann (Disco)
  - "American Express" (1979), "Underwater" (1980)
- Toto
  - "Georgy Porgy" (1978)
- The Trammps
  - "Hold Back the Night" (1976), "That's Where the Happy People Go" (1976), "Disco Inferno" (1976), "Disco Party" (1976), "The Whole World's Dancing" (1978)
- Joey Travolta
  - "What Did Love Ever Do for You?" (1979)
- Roger Troutman
  - "Do it Roger" (1981)
- Two Man Sound (Belgium, Disco Samba)
  - "Que Tal America" (1978), "Capital Tropical" (1979)

== U ==
- USA-European Connection
  - "Come Into My Heart/Good Loving" (1978)

== V ==
- Jerry Vale
  - "Toot, Toot, Tootsie (Goo' Bye!)" (1978)
- Frankie Valli
  - "Who Loves You" (1975), (w/ The Four Seasons) "Swearin' to God" (1975), "Our Day Will Come" (1975), "December 1963 (Oh What a Night)" (w/ The Four Seasons) (1976), "Grease" (1978), "Passion for Paris" (1979), "Soul" (1980), "Heaven Above Me" (1980), "Let It Be Whatever It Is" (1980)
- Luther Vandross (Luther 1976)
  - "It's Good for the Soul" (1976), "May Christmas Bring You Happiness" (1976), "Never Too Much" (1981), "Don't You Know That" (1981), "Sugar and Spice" (1981)
- Sylvie Vartan
  - "Georges (Georges Disco Tango)" (1977)
- Vaughn Mason & Crew
  - "Bounce, Rock, Skate, Roll" (1980)
- Tata Vega
  - "I'm Just Thinking about You Baby" (1979), "Givin' All My Love" (1980), "There's Love In The World" (1980)
- Village People
  - "San Francisco (You've Got Me)" (1977), "In Hollywood (Everybody Is a Star)" (1977), "Macho Man" (1978), "Y.M.C.A." (1978), "Go West" (1979), "In the Navy" (1979)
- Voggue
  - "Back Again" (1981), "Dancing The Night Away" (1981), "Roller Boogie" (1981), "I Love To Dance" (1983)
- Voyage
  - "From East to West" (1978), "Lady America" (1978), "Souvenirs" (1979), "Let's Fly Away" (1979), "Gone with the Music" (1979)
- VST & Company
  - "Ipagpatawad Mo" (1978), "Awitin Mo at Isasayaw ko" (1978), "Magsayawan" (1978)

== W ==
- Narada Michael Walden
  - "I Shoulda Loved Ya" (1979), "Tonight I'm Alright" (1979), "Lovin' You Madly" (1979)
- Anita Ward
  - "Ring My Bell" (1979), "Don't Drop My Love" (1979)
- Jeanette Washington (P Funk)
  - "Turn Your Boogie Loose" (1979)
- Johnny "Guitar" Watson
  - "Miss Frisco (Queen of the Disco)" (1978)
- Bob Welch
  - "Precious Love" (1978)
- The Whispers
  - "I Fell in Love Last Night (At the Disco)" (1976), "Make It with You" (1977), "Can't Do without Love" (1979), "And the Beat Goes On" (1979), "Rock Steady" (1987)
- Barry White
  - "Love's Theme" (1973), **"I'm Gonna Love You Just A Little More Baby" (1973), "You're the First, the Last, My Everything" (1974), "Never Never Gonna Give You Up" (1974), "Can't Get Enough of Your Love, Babe" (1974), "I'll Do For You Anything You Want Me To" (1975), "What Am I Gonna Do With You" (1975), "You See The Trouble With Me" (1976), "Baby, We Better Try To Get It Together" (1976), "Let The Music Play" (1976), "Don't Make Me Wait Too Long" (1976), "I'm Qualified To Satisfy You" (1976), "It's Ecstasy When You Lay Down Next to Me" (1977), "Never Thought I'd Fall In Love With You" (1977), "Look At Her" (1978), "Your Sweetness Is My Weakness" (1978), "Sha La La (Means I Love You)" (1978), "Any Fool Could See (You Were Meant For Me)" (1979), "I Love to Sing the Songs I Sing" (1979), "Sheet Music" (1980)
- Slim Whitman
  - "Cara Mia" (1977)
- Andy Williams
  - "Love Story (Where Do I Begin)" disco version (1979)
- Carol Williams
  - "Rattlesnake" (1975), "More" (1976), "Come Back" (1976), "Love Is You" (1977), "My time of need" (1977), "Love has come my way" (1978), "Dance the Night Away" (1979), "Tell the World All about Our Love" (1979)
- Lenny Williams
  - "If You're in Need" (1979), "When I'm Dancing" (1979)
- Viola Wills
  - "Gonna Get Along Without You Now" (1979), "If You Could Read My Mind" (1980), "Always Something There to Remind Me" (1980), "Up On The Roof" (1980), "Don't Ever Stop Loving Me" (1981), "Stormy Weather" (1982), "Both Sides Now" (1985)
- Al Wilson
  - "I've Got A Feeling (We'll Be Seeing Each Other Again" (1976), "You Did It For Me" (1976), "Count The Days" (1979), "Earthquake" (1979)
- Jackie Wilson
  - "It Only Happens When I Look At You" (1977)
- Mary Wilson
  - "Red Hot" (1979), "You Make Me Feel So Good" (1979)
- Wilton Place Street Band
  - "Disco Lucy" (1976), "Sweet, Sweet Baby Love" (1977), "Gonna Have a Party" (1977)
- Wings
  - "Silly Love Songs" (1976), "Goodnight Tonight" (1979)
- Bill Withers
  - "Lovely Day" (1977), "You've Got the Stuff" (1979)
- Bobby Womack
  - "It's Party Time" (1978), "Trust Your Heart" (1978)
- Stevie Wonder
  - "Superstition" (1972), "You Haven't Done Nothing" (1974), "I Wish" (1976), "Another Star" (1976), "All I Do" (1980), "I Ain't Gonna Stand For It" (1980), "Did I Hear You Say You Love Me" (1980), "Do I Do" (1982), "Part Time Lover" (1985)
- Carol Woods
  - "I'm in Wonderland" (1977)
- Nanette Workman
  - "Lady Marmelade" (1976), "Danser, Danser" (1976)
- Norma Jean Wright
  - "Saturday" (1978), "Sorcerer" (1978), "High Society" (1979)

== Y ==
- Alka Yagnik (India)
  - "Tum Nahin Jaana" (1998)
- "Weird Al" Yankovic
  - "Gotta Boogie" (1980)
- John Paul Young
  - "Standing In The Rain" (1977), "Love Is In The Air" (1978), "The Day My Heart Caught Fire"
- Karen Young
  - "Hot Shot" (1978)
- Yuri
  - "Goma de mascar" (1980), "Ease On down the Road" (1980), "Primer amor" (1980), "Eso que llaman amor" (1980), "Nunca he sido tan feliz" (1980), "Regresarás" (1981), "Mi timídez" (1981), "Y descubrir que te quiero" (1983).

== Z ==
- Zdravo
  - "Vikend fobija" (1978)
- David Zed
  - "I Am a Robot" (1980), "R.O.B.O.T." (1980), "Ballarobot" (1983)
- Zodiac
  - "Zodiac" (1980), "Pacific" (1980), "Provincial Disco" (1980)
- Zulema
  - "Half of Your Heart" (1975), "Change" (1979)
