= Tony Camillo =

American record producer

Anthony J. Camillo (August 11, 1928 – August 29, 2018) was an American record producer, orchestrator and arranger.

== Background ==
Camillo, born in Somerville, New Jersey, worked on many soul, pop and disco recordings of the 1960s and 1970s, including Ronnie Williams, recordings by Dionne Warwick, Eric Carmen, The Stylistics, Dazz Band, Millie Jackson, The Chambers Brothers, Peaches & Herb, Sha Na Na, Grand Funk Railroad, Stevie Wonder, The 5th Dimension, Martha Reeves, The Supremes, Parliament, and Tommy James.

== Career ==
In the early 1970s, he spent some time working in Detroit with Motown and also the Holland-Dozier-Holland production team on their Invictus and Hot Wax labels before returning to Hillsborough, New Jersey where he established a recording studio, Venture Sound, in 1971. In 1973 he co-produced and arranged Gladys Knight & the Pips' number one hit, "Midnight Train to Georgia" at Venture Sound, which was awarded a Grammy Award. Camillo also co-wrote and produced the group's 1974 hit, "I Feel a Song" which was a Billboard R&B number one (#21 pop).

Camillo produced soul singer Ronnie Williams' single, Dreamin' which was an up-tempo cover of the Johnny Burnette song. Released on the Roxbury label, it was a Single Pick in the 9 November 1974 issue of Record World. According to the 8 November issue of Radio & Records, it was a key add on at R&B stations, WDIA, WBOK, WYLD, and WVOL. It was also a key pop add on at secondary stations. The word was to watch out for this one.

Camillo also assembled the studio group Bazuka, which scored a Top Ten hit in the US in 1975 with "Dynomite". The track peaked at #28 in the UK Singles Chart in June 1975.

In 1978, he co-founded a record label, Venture Records. The label's biggest success came in 1982 with Canadian duo, Chéri, whose song, "Murphy's Law" reached #5 on the R&B and #39 on the pop chart.

Later in his career, Camillo turned to writing and scoring for films, including the horror film Welcome to Arrow Beach (1974), the Blaxploitation film Hangup (1974), and the action movies The Survivalist (1987) and Night Vision (1997). In 1994, he founded Venture Music Group, a licensing group, and served as its CEO. He operated his own studio in New Jersey for over 30 years until his death.

Camillo died on August 29, 2018, at the age of 90.
