= Freddie James (musician) =

Canadian musician (born 1964)

- Born: April 26, 1964 (age 61)
- Genres: R&B; Disco; Hip hop
- Occupations: Singer; musician
- Instrument: Vocals

Freddie James (born April 26, 1964) is a Canadian dance and rhythm and blues musician, most noted for his 1979 disco hit "(Everybody) Get Up and Boogie".

The son of singer Geraldine Hunt, he was born in Chicago, Illinois and moved to Montreal, Quebec in childhood.

At age 14, he released the four song EP Get Up and Boogie in 1979. He received two Juno Award nominations at the Juno Awards of 1980, for Single of the Year for "(Everybody) Get Up and Boogie", and for Most Promising Male Vocalist. In the same year, he won the Canadian Black Music Award for Best Album. He followed up in 1981 with the album Sweetness.

In addition to his own work, he was a credited producer on "Murphy's Law", a single by his sister Rosalind Hunt's band Chéri.

In 1985, he appeared in a Montreal production of Hair. In 1987, he had a supporting role in the film Wild Thing.

In 1992, he released the more hip hop influenced album Come into the Jungle on Monogram Records. In 1999 he appeared on his mother's album Soultry, Jazzy and Sexy. He has not released any new recorded music since that time, but has continued to perform in the Montreal area, and selected touring dates.

In 2015, he went public with an accusation of racial profiling after being stopped by Montreal Police Service officers for driving while black.
