= I Love Beijing Tiananmen =

"我爱北京天安门"
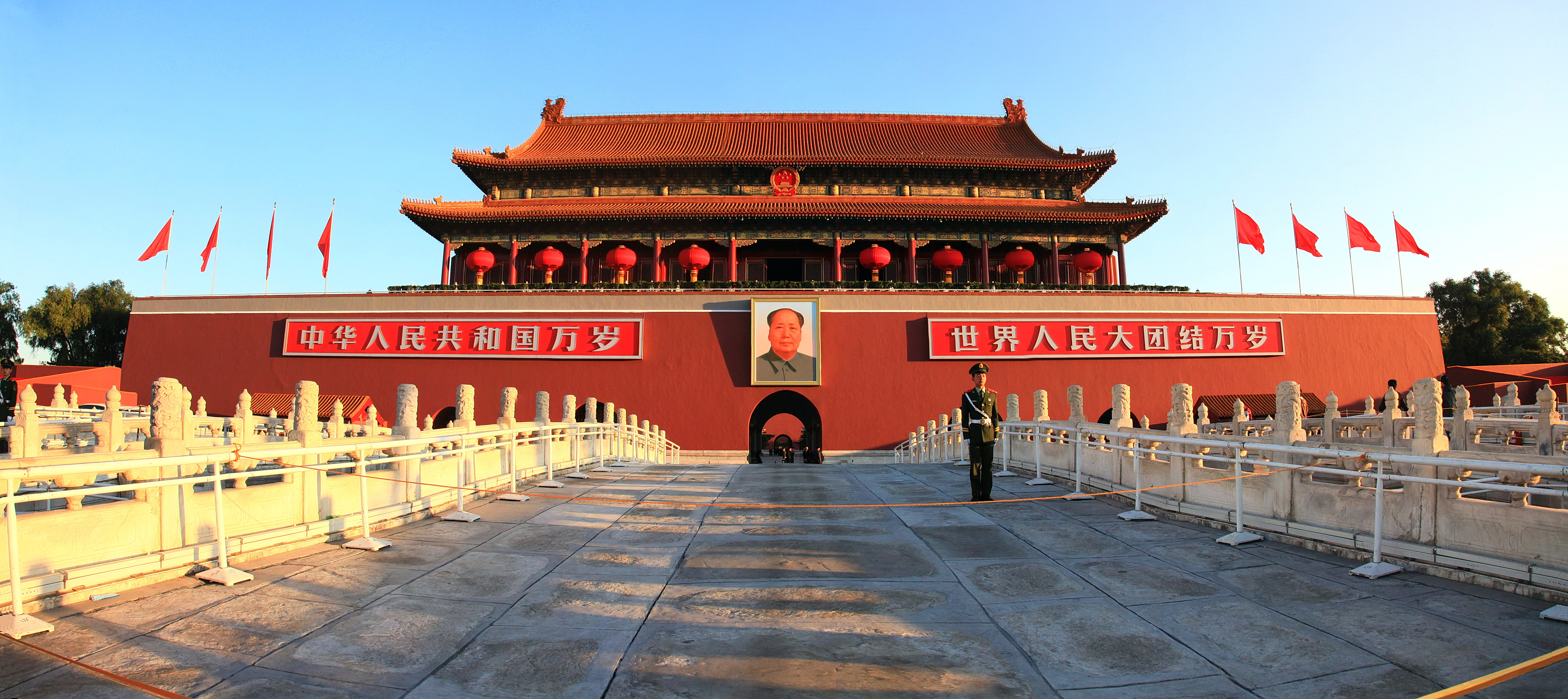
- Tiananmen in Beijing

Song
- Language: Mandarin Chinese
- English title: I Love Beijing Tiananmen
- Genre: Children's music, revolutionary song
- Songwriter: Jin Yueling
- Lyricist: Jin Guolin

Audio sample
- "I Love Beijing Tiananmen": file; help

"I Love Beijing Tiananmen" (Chinese: 我爱北京天安门; pinyin: wǒ ài běijīng tiān'ānmén; lit. 'I Love Beijing's Tiananmen') is a children's song from the Cultural Revolution period of China that appears in the first volume of the state-compiled anthology New Songs of the Battlefield (1972–1976). The song is credited to composer Jin Yueling and lyricist Jin Guolin and is frequently cited as a classic example of Cultural Revolution children's repertoire.

== History ==
In September 1970, "I Love Beijing Tiananmen" was published in Shanghai, the "Red Little Soldier Song" was broadcast by the China National Radio in 1971.

This song was part of the daily routine for many primary schools. It would be sung, following "The Internationale" and "The East is Red". It was also used as propaganda with a similar use to Red Sun in the Sky. Later, it was adapted into various styles and genres of music (such as accordion, xylophone solo music, etc.). In 1981, it was included in the "Lyrics Song Collection" of Guangdong Huacheng Publishing House.

The lyricist is Jin Guolin, a 12-year-old student in the 5th grade of primary school in 1970, and the songwriter is Jin Yue-ho, a 19-year-old apprentice at Shanghai's sixth glass factory. After the Cultural Revolution (1977), he studied at the Central Conservatory of Music, and became a student of famous composers and conductors with 谭盾, Chen Zuo湟, etc. After graduation, he became music editor of the Shanghai Company of China Records. According to reports in 1999, Kim has created two or three hundred lyrical songs of all kinds, some of which have won various awards in national music competitions.

"I Love Beijing Tiananmen" has been used repeatedly and processed to become an iconic work in the song recited lyric songs, and has entered the ranks of classic works representing the spirit of that era. Before U.S. President Ronald Reagan's visit to China, the first choral program performed by the American Art Troupe in Beijing was "I Love Beijing Tiananmen Square."

The first three measures of the chorus of this song were used repeatedly as background music in Hong Kong 97, an infamous bootleg Super Famicom game released in 1995. The game, whose plot involved the handover of Hong Kong in 1997, had a strong anti-communist sentiment.

== Lyrics ==
Chinese

我爱北京天安门，
天安门上太阳升；
伟大领袖毛主席，
指引我们向前进。

Pinyin

Wǒ ài Běijīng Tiān'ānmén,
Tiān'ānmén shàng tàiyáng shēng;
Wěidà lǐngxiù Máo zhǔxí,
Zhǐyǐn wǒmen xiàngqián jìn.

Translation

I love Beijing Tiananmen,
The sun rises above Tiananmen.
The great leader Chairman Mao,
Leads all of us forward.
