= The Story of Kamikuishiki Village =

1995 video game

- The Story of Kamikuishiki Village's title screen, depicting Shoko Asahara and photographs of Aum Shinrikyo's compound
- Developer: HappySoft Ltd.
- Publisher: Aum Soft
- Programmers: Takeshi Kanai, Kouichi Karasawa
- Platform: PC-98
- Release: June 29, 1995
- Genres: Strategy, Visual novel
- Mode: Single-player

The Story of Kamikuishiki Village (上九一色村物語, Kamikuishiki-mura Monogatari) is a satirical Japanese doujin resource management strategy game developed by HappySoft and published by Aum Soft that was released for PC-98 on June 29, 1995. Kamikuishiki Village satirises the Aum Shinrikyo cult and the 1995 Tokyo subway sarin gas attack orchestrated by the cult; a common misconception is that the game was produced by the cult as propaganda, whereas The Story of Kamikuishiki Village actually portrays Aum and the sarin gas attack negatively, mocking its members and showing footage of 'humiliating' media coverage.

Kamikuishiki Village uses full motion video, using real-life footage of the Aum Shinrikyo cult, and animated footage taken from the anime created by the cult, Chouetsu Sekai.

== Gameplay ==
Kamikuishiki Village's main map screen depicting the village, and Shoko Asahara's portrait in the upper right corner. On the right, the player's stats may be seen, and under that are selectable inputs; Train, Missionary Work, Solicitation, Invest, and Rest.

The player takes the role of Shoko Asahara, the leader of the Aum Shinrikyo cult, and manages the cult's operations, collecting resources and indoctrinating new members, with the end goal of carrying out the 1995 Tokyo subway sarin gas attack. The Story of Kamikuishiki Village has two endings; the player wins the game by carrying out the sarin gas attack, and if the player loses, armageddon ends the world.

Time in Kamikuishiki Village passes by the player performing actions; the game begins on October 1, 1989 and is heavily time-based. In addendum to input from the player, there are events that take place on certain dates. This lines up with real events related to Aum Shinrikyo; for instance, on November 4, 1989, the Sakamoto family murders are committed, and on June 27, 1994 the Matsumoto sarin gas attack occurs, regardless of the player's input. Kamikuishiki Village's inputs include training Asahara's 'abilities', missionary work, investing, soliciting money from followers, and resting.

== History ==
The Story of Kamikuishiki Village has been speculated to have been created by the Aum Shinrikyo cult as propaganda, comparable to the anime created by the cult as an attempt to indoctrinate new members, Chouetsu Sekai. The title The Story of Kamikuishiki Village originates from Aum Shinrikyo primarily operating out of the Japanese village of Kamikuishiki. An article by Vice elaborates on Kamikuishiki Village's history, and dispels internet speculation as to the purpose of the game. Vice contacted Sarah Hightower, an independent researcher who studies domestic terror movements, and an expert on the Aum Shinrikyo cult. Hightower expresses that The Story of Kamikuishiki Village is not propaganda from Aum Shinrikyo, but satire that mocks the cult, furthermore stating that "Basically everything you see on YouTube about ‘this game will brainwash you’ is bullshit ... The game wasn't made by Aum or Aleph [an Aum Shinrikyo splinter group].” Kamikuishiki Village contains real-life footage of members of the cult; this has been used as evidence in online speculation that Aum Shinrikyo created the game. However, most of the selected footage was obtained from news broadcasts following the attack as it was widely covered in Japanese media, and the footage portrays the cult negatively. This misconception was likely caused by both limited understanding of the cult and attack, and also due to a language barrier. An exception of this is the usage of propaganda footage created by the cult in the game's introduction, portraying an Aum follower attempting to fly using a meditation practice called Darduri Siddhi (Asahara began the cult as a yoga class, and claimed he could fly using this technique), which is followed by a video of Aum spokesperson Fumihiro Joyu being questioned by reporters following the sarin gas attack.

Hightower stated in regards to Kamikuishiki Village's cult imagery that “Some of it really is footage from cult propaganda, but what's important to keep in mind is that after the [sarin] attack, TV news showed thousands of hours of Aum coverage and even the cult's internal propaganda was picked through bit by bit,” furthermore stating that “If you look at the opening to the game, it's all mostly the shit people like the original ‘Aumers’ and kids at the time were mocking,” and that "there were a few very absurd things about Aum... that stood out to the public.” Furthermore, an advertisement for Kamikuishiki Village in Game Urara Vol. 4 explicitly states that "We have absolutely NO relation with Aum Shinrikyo. We hate them." Notable members of the Aum Shinrikyo cult are vulgarly mocked in Kamikuishiki Village's advertisement, such as its describing to the player's role in the game as Shoko Asahara as "[selling] off your own saliva, blood, cum and such to stupid believers".

A caricature of Shoko Asahara depicting him bottling his bathwater; the water is sold to Aum Shinrikyo members, and other imagery in the game shows people injecting it into their bodies using an IV drip or with syringes.

The Story of Kamikuishiki Village was released on June 29, 1995, and was sold via underground magazines, such as Game Urara, a magazine known for shock images, software piracy, and pornography. Vice contacted three pseudonymous individuals who collect, research, and translate obscure Japanese video games; 'Senn', 'togemet2', and 'Metalik'. According to them, The Story of Kamikuishiki Village is a homebrew interactive visual novel doujin game from the 1990s Japanese underground software scene. The Story of Kamikuishiki Village's advertisement in Game Urara Vol. 4 refers to it as a "fun work of art straight from the bowels of hell", and compares the game to Romance of the Three Kingdoms III.

HappySoft, The Story of Kamikuishiki Village's developer, is known for low-budget satirical games, and is primarily known for another controversial title, Hong Kong 97, which has been regarded as 'one of the worst games ever made' and notably contains an image of a real human corpse as its game over screen. In response to an inquiry by Vice, Yoshihisa 'Kowloon' Kurosawa, stated that he didn't work on the game, but that it "was made by two of my friends while we were still in high school," and due to Aum's increasing political relevance and the cult running political candidates in elections, "The experience shook us, so those two ended up creating [The Story of Kamikuishiki Village] and I also made a game about Aum on my own.” Kamikuishiki Village was created by Takeshi Kanai and Kouichi Karasawa; Kurosawa described the two as 'talented programmers', and stated that "I think they used a lot of new and innovative techniques to create it"; Kouichi Karasawa later worked for Konami.

Kamikuishiki Village was sold solely through mail order, and cost ¥14500 yen in 1995; it was originally going to be sold at Comiket, but one of the programmers decided against it. Kamikuishiki Village spans twelve 3 1/2" floppy disks; the game may not be run off the disks directly, and must be installed to a hard drive. Kamikuishiki Village uses footage from the anime Chouetsu Sekai, and the game's soundtrack consists of music sung by Shoko Asahara.

== Reception ==
Possibly due to The Story of Kamikuishiki Village's subject matter, price, and underground release, the game is not known to have been reviewed in any gaming magazines. However, Kamikuishiki Village has seen modern relevance in the form of online speculation that the game was created by Aum Shinrikyo. Kamikuishiki Village has received interest in the niche of 'eerie' video games, primarily due to the game's reference of real events and real deaths, and the use of real-life footage.
