= Hong Kong 97 =

1995 video game

- The cover for the release contains cut images of Bruce Lee and Deng Xiaoping.
- Developer: HappySoft
- Publisher: HappySoft
- Designer: Kowloon Kurosawa
- Platform: Super Famicom
- Release: JP: 1995
- Genre: Bullet hell
- Mode: Single-player

Hong Kong 97 (Note: Japanese: Hon Kon 97 (香港97); Chinese: 香港97; pinyin: Xiānggǎng Jiǔqī; Cantonese Yale: Hēunggóng Gáuchāt) (also referred to as Hong Kong 1997 on the floppy disk cover) is an unlicensed shoot 'em up video game developed and published by HappySoft, a doujin game developer, for the Super Famicom. It was released in Japan in 1995, being sold as floppy disks. Designed by the Japanese game journalist Kowloon Kurosawa, who stated the game was a satire of the video game industry, Hong Kong 97 was made in seven days with the help of his friend.

The game takes place in China in 1997, during the handover of Hong Kong from the United Kingdom. Facing an increased crime rate due to immigration from Mainland China, the Hong Kong government hires Chin, a relative of Bruce Lee, to massacre the population of China. Meanwhile, the Chinese government has been conducting a secret project in which the deceased Tong Shau Ping [sic] will be resurrected and transformed into an "ultimate weapon" to battle Chin. (Note: Tong Shau Ping is a depiction of Chinese leader Deng Xiaoping, who was still alive at the time of development; he died on 19 February 1997, a few months before the handover of Hong Kong, the game's backdrop.) After defeating Tong Shau Ping, the game is repeated indefinitely until Chin dies. Hong Kong 97 sold around 30 copies due to its underground bootleg release. It has since gained a cult following for its notoriously poor quality, offensive content and absurd gameplay. In retrospect, it is considered by critics and journalists to be among the worst games ever made. A sequel, titled Hong Kong 2097, was released in February 2026 for Windows.

== Gameplay ==
Chin (bottom) firing at incoming enemies. The background uses the 1990-2007 logo for Asia Television. The player's score, shown in Chinese characters, is displayed at the top.

The player controls Chin, who must shoot and evade the Chinese populace moving downwards from the top of the screen. When shot, the enemies explode in mushroom clouds, leaving behind a flashing corpse and items for instant death or temporary invincibility. After a while, cars start appearing from the sides, moving horizontally across the screen as obstacles. After thirty enemies have been defeated by the player, the final boss, the "ultimate weapon" Tong Shau Ping appears. He is depicted as a large, severed, floating head that will attempt to land on top of the player. Once he is defeated, the game repeats itself. The game shows static photos as the background, which alternate between pictures of Maoist propaganda, Guilin, the logo for Asia Television, the logo for Chinese Coca-Cola, or Mao Zedong in monochrome.

Sporadically, a syringe appears as a power-up, which grants Chin temporary invincibility. Rotating green disks will also appear that can instantly kill Chin. The player has no health points: if Chin is hit by anything other than the syringe, the game is immediately over, unless he is under invincibility. The game over screen contains the superimposed words "Chin IS DEAD!!" in English and grammatically incorrect Chinese "陳死亡" (pinyin: Chén sǐ wáng) (Note: "Chén sǐ wáng" (陳死亡) can be interpreted as either "Chin is dead", or as a proper name, "Dead Chin".) over a still graphic image of a corpse dated to 1992 from the Bosnian War taken from the Japanese mondo film New Death File III. The game then goes to the credits (listing the Embassy of Canada as a cooperation partner) and back to the title screen.

Upon turning on the game, the first three measures of the chorus of an upbeat rock-style rendition of "I Love Beijing Tiananmen" can be heard, which loops indefinitely throughout the game. The game has no other music or sound effects, and the music will not stop or pause while playing the game under any circumstance, whether that is dying or manually resetting the game. The game can be played in English, Japanese or traditional Chinese.

== Plot ==
Hong Kong 97 begins with a short cutscene which places the game around the transfer of sovereignty over Hong Kong in 1997. People from Mainland China (described in the English script as "fuckin' ugly reds" and in the Japanese script as "dirty people spitting sputum") begin immigrating to Hong Kong, leading to a large increase in the crime rate. As a countermeasure, the Hong Kong government (represented in-game by then-British Governor Chris Patten) hires Chin (portrayed by Jackie Chan), an unspecified relative of Bruce Lee, to "wipe out" all 1.2 billion of the "red communists" in China. Meanwhile, a secret project in Mainland China has succeeded in resurrecting Tong Shau Ping (portrayed by Deng Xiaoping) as the "ultimate weapon".

The Chinese translation of the game refers to Chin as "Mister Chan" (Chinese: 陳先生; pinyin: Chén xiānshēng), alluding to the fact that a picture of Jackie Chan, taken from the 1984 film Wheels on Meals, was used to depict the character. The back of the insert of the game notes that Chin is a heroin addict.

== Development ==
In January 2018, Kowloon Kurosawa finally broke his silence on the development of the game to the South China Morning Post. He stated that his goal was to make the worst game possible as a mockery of the game industry. Since Kurosawa did not have much programming skill, he had an Enix employee help him out, with the game being made in two days. He later asked a friend with basic knowledge of English to translate the story into this language, as well as an exchange student from Hong Kong to translate it into Chinese. Kurosawa took the music, an audio clip from "I Love Beijing Tiananmen", from a second-hand LaserDisc he got in Shanghai Street, and the main character sprite, depicting Jackie Chan, was taken from a movie poster of Wheels on Meals, a 1984 Hong Kong martial arts film.

With the game completed, Kurosawa used a game backup device that could copy Super Famicom games onto floppy disks, which he found whilst wandering through the computer malls of Sham Shui Po. Due to game backup devices being illegal in Japan at the time, Kurosawa could only advertise his game through articles written under pseudonyms for underground gaming magazines. He set up a mail-order service to sell the game on floppy discs and cartridges, for ¥2,000 – ¥2,500 ($20–$25 in USD). It sold only about 30 copies, despite him having printed several hundred copies of the insert, which he later threw away. He eventually forgot about the game, until he became aware that it was gaining some unwanted attention in the late 2000s. Eventually, his Facebook account was discovered and was bombarded with questions about the game. In 2023, Kurosawa made the game freely available to download from his personal website.

== Reception ==
In an advertisement in the underground magazine Game Urara for another HappySoft title, The Story of Kamikuishiki Village, Hong Kong 97's poor quality is acknowledged, with the advert referring to the game as "dreadful" and "incomprehensible". It also claims that bootleg copies of the game were widely sold in Hong Kong and Bangkok. Kurosawa wrote on his website that pirated copies were additionally sold in South Korea and Taiwan, and that the game was reviewed by a Thai gaming magazine and a Taiwanese website.

In retrospective reviews, Hong Kong 97 was met with overwhelmingly negative reception, with many calling it one of the worst video games ever made. The game has garnered a "so bad, it's good" cult following in Japan, Thailand and Taiwan. It gained notoriety in the West after it became the subject of an Angry Video Game Nerd YouTube video.

== Sequel ==
On October 21, 2025, an official sequel was announced titled Hong Kong 2097 as a collaboration with KaniPro Games and Kurosawa. It was set to be released in December 2025 for Windows through Steam. On December 4, KaniPro delayed the game's release to Q1 of 2026, as Steam had yet to reach a ruling for two weeks since the build was re-submitted for review. After being rejected by Steam, GOG, and DLsite (the latter due to its use of digitized graphics), the game was finally released on itch.io on February 2, 2026.

== See also ==
- Hong Kong–Mainland China conflict
- The Story of Kamikuishiki Village, another game developed by HappySoft with controversial content
