= Wilton Place Street Band =

American Disco Band

Wilton Place Street Band was an American disco group of studio musicians put together by record producer Trevor Lawrence in Los Angeles, California for the purpose of recording an instrumental disco cover version of the theme tune to I Love Lucy. The resultant "Disco Lucy" was released on Island Records as a single in 1977. It reached #7 on the U.S. Club Play chart, #9 Easy Listening and #24 on the Top 40.

== Disco Lucy ==
Record producer Trevor Lawrence assembled studio musicians, including his then-wife Lynda Lawrence of the Supremes into a disco group in Los Angeles, California. The purpose of the Wilton Place Street Band—so named because Lawrence lived on Wilton Place in L.A.— was to record an instrumental disco cover version of the theme tune to I Love Lucy. The result was released as the single "Disco Lucy" on Island Records in 1977. It hit #7 on the U.S. Club Play chart and #24 on the Top 40. The song was also released in Australia where it peaked at number 93.

== Legacy ==
Two further singles followed: "Sweet, Sweet Baby Love" and "Gonna Have a Party".

== Lawrence's pedigree ==
Trevor Lawrence played baritone saxophone with the Butterfield Blues Band at the Woodstock Music Festival and on records. He played tenor sax, soprano sax, and baritone sax solos on Marvin Gaye's Trouble Man album. He was part of Stevie Wonder's Wonderlove band, playing on Talking Book, Songs In The Key Of Life, and other albums. Lawrence has toured with the Rolling Stones and he played on the Isley Brothers' classic "It's Your Thing". He was the arranger and associate producer for the Pointer Sisters' hits "He's So Shy", " Slow Hand", and "I'm So Excited", the last of which he also co-wrote. Lawrence is the music supervisor and composer for Sidney Poitier's film To Sir, With Love II.
