= Kowloon Kurosawa =

Japanese businessman and author (born 1971)

Yoshihisa Kurosawa
- 黒沢 喜久
- Born: Kurosawa Yoshihisa; 1971; Tokyo, Japan
- Occupations: Author; businessman
- Notable work: Hong Kong 97
- Website: Personal website

Yoshihisa "Kowloon" Kurosawa (黒沢 喜久, Kurosawa Yoshihisa) (born 1971) is a Japanese businessman, essayist, and nonfiction writer from Tokyo, Japan. He is best known for being the designer of Hong Kong 97 on the Super Famicom, which is considered to be one of the worst video games ever made.

Currently, he writes underground travel journals and computer books in Asia, and resides in Phnom Penh, Cambodia.

== Career ==
In junior high school, Kurosawa presided over a BBS for the computer system Amiga.

He has been serialized in magazines related to computer games for enthusiasts, making use of his knowledge as a computer geek and the experience of the age of the magicom. Beginning with the coverage of pirated game software in Hong Kong, he began to write a travel journal about Asia's underground. He then moved to Cambodia and did free business papers and business activities such as running a bookstore, but both ventures failed. He continues writing in parallel with business activities.

== Game development ==
In 1995, Hong Kong 97 was released on the Super Famicom by Japanese homebrew game development company HappySoft Ltd. Kurosawa developed the game without any public knowledge, and his involvement was unknown for the next 23 years. Having gained a cult following for its notoriously bad quality, the game was considered to be a kusoge ("shitty game").

In January 2018, Kurosawa finally broke his silence on the development of the game to the South China Morning Post. He stated that his goal was to make the worst game possible as a mockery to the game industry. Since Kurosawa did not have much programming skills, he had an Enix employee help him out, with the game being made in two days. Kurosawa took the music from a second-hand LaserDisc he got in Shanghai Street, and the main character sprite was taken from a movie poster.

With the game completed, Kurosawa used a game backup device that could copy Super Famicom games onto floppy disks, devices sold in computer malls of Sham Shui Po. He made some merchandise through articles written under pseudonyms for underground gaming magazines, and set up a mail-order service to sell the game in floppy disks and cartridges. After selling it for a few months, he forgot about his bootleg. He became aware that Hong Kong 97 was gaining some unwanted attention in the late 2000s. Eventually, fans of Hong Kong 97 found his Facebook account and since then he has been repeatedly bombarded with questions surrounding the game.

Kurosawa was also involved in the 2005 Simple series game The Mini Skirt Police (THE ミニ美女警官(スケポリス)) as the game designer, which was his first video game title to have a retail release. The game was in the middle of development when he joined Daft and his input for the design was heavily influenced by the Rockstar Games title Manhunt. There were only about five people who worked on the game, including Kurosawa and his friend who previously helped him program Hong Kong 97.
