= Dynomite (song) =

Single by Bazuka

from the album Bazuka
- B-side: "Dynomite - Part II"
- Released: March 1975
- Recorded: by Ed Stasium
- Studio: Venture Sound, Hillsborough, New Jersey
- Genre: Funk
- Length: 3:30
- Label: A&M
- Songwriter: Tony Camillo
- Producer: Tony Camillo

Bazuka singles chronology
"Dynomite" (1975)	"Love Explosion" (1975)

"Dynomite" is a song written by Tony Camillo and performed by Bazuka. The song was featured on their 1975 album, Bazuka.

== Background ==
The song, produced and arranged by Camillo, was inspired by the catchphrase of the character J.J. on the television series Good Times. This instrumental features the sounds of whistling and exploding sounds of dynamite. The repeated sung catchphrase of "Dynomite" is the song's only lyric.

== Chart performance ==
"Dynomite" reached #6 on the US Dance chart, #11 on the US Disco chart, #28 on the UK Singles Chart, and #29 on the US R&B chart in 1975. It peaked at #10 on the Billboard Hot 100 the week of August 2, 1975.

The single ranked #52 on Billboard's Year-End Hot 100 singles of 1975.

== Song sampling ==
- The song was sampled in Dickie Goodman's 1975 novelty song "Mr. Jaws".
- The song was sampled in Gang Starr's song "Aiiight Chill..." on their 1994 album, Hard to Earn.
- The song was sampled in Len's song "Cryptik Souls Crew" on their 1999 album, You Can't Stop the Bum Rush.
