= Bazuka =

American instrumental R&B group

Bazuka was an American instrumental R&B group, put together by the record producer Tony Camillo. They released a self-titled album on A&M Records in 1975 which featured the song "Dynomite", a #10 hit in the US Billboard pop chart that year. The single also peaked at #29 on the US R&B chart, #6 Hot Dance Club Play, and #11 Disco. The track peaked at #28 in the UK Singles Chart in June 1975. The follow-up single, "Love Explosion", was less successful, peaking at #92 on the US R&B chart.

== Discography ==
=== Albums ===
Year	Album	Record label
1975	Bazuka	A&M Records

=== Singles ===
Year	Title	Peak chart positions						Record Label	B-side	Album
Year	Title	US	US R&B	US Dance	US Disco	AUS	UK	Record Label	B-side	Album
1975	"Dynomite"	10	29	6	11	97	28	A&M Records	"Dynomite - Part II"	Bazuka
1975	"Love Explosion"	—	92	—	—	—	—	A&M Records	"Bazuka Limited"	Bazuka
1976	"Theme from Police Woman"	—	—	—	—	—	—	A&M Records	"Walkin' Tall"	
1979	"(C'est) Le Rock"	—	—	—	—	—	—	Venture Records	"Rock the Night Away"	
