= Queen Samantha =

- Born: Gloria Brooks
- Genres: Funk, disco
- Occupations: Musician, singer-songwriter
- Instrument: Vocals
- Years active: 1978–present
- Labels: Atoll Records; Megatone label Marlin label TK Records

Queen Samantha was a 1970s disco artist produced by the Parisian musician Harry Chalkitis. Gloria Brooks, a singer from Chicago, was the lead vocalist on many of Chalkitis' recordings. All of the songs were co-written by Chalkitis and his wife Myriam (except a charting cover version of "The Letter", originally by The Box Tops). Chalkitis recorded the tracks while living in Paris, and the records were released on Atoll Records, a French label. In the U.S., the records were released by Henry Stone's Marlin label.

Queen Samantha's biggest hit was "Mama Rue". The single "Take a Chance" backed with "Sweet San Francisco" was released on TK Records and remixed by Steve Thompson and Michael Arato. Other charting singles include 1980's "Funky Celebration", 1982's "Give Me Action", and 1983's "Close Your Eyes" on California's Megatone label.

== Discography ==
=== Albums ===
- The Letter (1978)
- Queen Samantha II (1978)
- Queen Samantha (1979)

=== Singles ===
- Sweet San Francisco (1979)
- Take a Chance (1979) (#14 U.S. Billboard Disco Top 100)
- Mama Rue (C'est Moi) (1980)
- Funky Celebration (1981) (#79 U.S. Billboard Disco Top 100)
- Give Me Action (1982)
- Close Your Eyes (1983)

=== Compilations ===
- Disco Boum No. 3 (1983)
- Ghetto Discothèque (2002)
