= Long Live Comrade Mao for Ten Thousand Years =

Chinese patriotic song

"Long Live Comrade Mao for Ten Thousand Years" (simplified Chinese: 万岁毛主席; traditional Chinese: 萬歲毛主席; pinyin: Wànsuì máo zhǔxí), variously known in English as "Long Live Chairman Mao for Ten Thousand Years" or simply "Long Live Chairman Mao!", is a Chinese patriotic song popularised during the Cultural Revolution. The title of the song is based on a popular slogan of the Red Guard, and was used widely during the Cultural Revolution in public demonstrations and rallies. However, since the end of the Mao era, the song has become more scarcely used due to its links to Mao's pervasive personality cult. However, the instrumental version of the song is still occasionally used. It is also used by the Young Pioneers of China and occasionally by the Communist Youth League of China.

== Lyrics ==
Simplified Chinese	Traditional Chinese	Pinyin	English Translation
金色的太阳升起在东方 光芒万丈东风万里鲜花开放 红旗像大海洋 伟大的导师英明的领袖 敬爱的毛主席 革命人民心中的太阳 心中的红太阳 万岁毛主席万岁毛主席 万岁万岁万岁万岁万万岁 万岁万岁毛主席 各民族团结坚强如钢斗志昂扬 革命的航船乘风破浪前程灿烂辉煌 伟大的导师英明的领袖敬爱的毛主席 各族人民跟着您前进 奔向共产主义前方 万岁毛主席万岁毛主席 万岁万岁万岁万岁万万岁 万岁万岁毛主席	金色的太陽升起在東方 光芒萬丈東風萬里鮮花開放 紅旗像大海洋 偉大的導師英明的領袖 敬愛的毛主席 革命人民心中的太陽 心中的紅太陽 萬歲毛主席萬歲毛主席 萬歲萬歲萬歲萬歲萬萬歲 萬歲萬歲毛主席 各民族團結堅強如鋼鬥志昂揚 革命的航船乘風破浪前程燦爛輝煌 偉大的導師英明的領袖敬愛的毛主席 各族人民跟著您前進 奔向共產主義前方 萬歲毛主席萬歲毛主席 萬歲萬歲萬歲萬歲萬萬歲 萬歲萬歲毛主席	jīn sè dí tài yáng shēng qǐ zài dōng fāng guāng máng wàn zhàng dōng fēng wàn lǐ xiān huā kāi fàng hóng qí xiàng dà hǎi yáng wěi dà dí dǎo shī yīng míng dí lǐng xiù jìng ài dí máo zhǔ xí gé mìng rén mín xīn zhōng dí tài yáng xīn zhōng dí hóng tài yáng wàn suì máo zhǔ xí wàn suì máo zhǔ xí wàn suì wàn suì wàn suì wàn suì wàn wàn suì wàn suì wàn suì máo zhǔ xí gè mín zú tuán jié jiān qiáng rú gāng dǒu zhì áng yáng gé mìng dí háng chuán chéng fēng pò làng qián chéng càn làn huī huáng wěi dà dí dǎo shī yīng míng dí lǐng xiù jìng ài dí máo zhǔ xí gè zú rén mín gēn zhuó nín qián jìn bēn xiàng gòng chǎn zhǔ yì qián fāng wàn suì máo zhǔ xí wàn suì máo zhǔ xí wàn suì wàn suì wàn suì wàn suì wàn wàn suì wàn suì wàn suì máo zhǔ xí	The golden sun rises in the east, Shining for miles from the east as flowers open, The red flag is like a big ocean. Great mentor, heroic leader, Dear Chairman Mao! The sun is in the hearts of the revolutionary people, The red sun in our hearts. Long live Chairman Mao! (Long live Chairman Mao!); Long live Chairman Mao! (Long live Chairman Mao!); Long live, long live, long may you live for ten thousand years, Long live Comrade Chairman Mao for ten thousand years! Clear away the fog and disperse the dark clouds The sky will be sunny. The ship of revolution rides the wind and waves. The future is brilliant. Great commander, great helmsman, Dear Chairman Mao! The sun is in the hearts of the revolutionary people, The red sun in our hearts. Long live Chairman Mao! (Long live Chairman Mao!); Long live Chairman Mao! (Long live Chairman Mao!); Long live, long live, long may you live for ten thousand years, Long live Comrade Chairman Mao for ten thousand years! All ethnicities are united and strong, with high morale, The ship of revolution rides the wind and waves to a bright future. Great commander, great helmsman, Dear Chairman Mao! People of all ethnicities follow you, Towards the front of Communism. Long live Chairman Mao! (Long live Chairman Mao!); Long live Chairman Mao! (Long live Chairman Mao!); Long live, long live, long may you live for ten thousand years, Long live Comrade Chairman Mao for ten thousand years!

== See also ==
- Dong Fang Hong I – First satellite launched by China in 1970
- The East Is Red (1965 film) – 1965 communist musical by Wang Ping
- Honglaowai – American internet celebrity
- Maoism – Variety of Marxism–Leninism in China
- Ode to the Motherland – Patriotic song from the People's Republic of China
- Sailing the Seas Depends on the Helmsman – 1964 Chinese revolutionary song
- Without the Communist Party, There Would Be No New China – Chinese Communist Party song
- The East Is Red (song) – De facto national anthem of the People's Republic of China
