= Murphy's Law (Chéri song) =

1982 single by Chéri

Single by Chéri

from the album Chéri (Canada and France, 1982) Murphy's Law (US, 1982)
- Released: April 1982
- Genre: Pop, funk, post disco
- Length: 3:53
- Label: Venture (U.S.); 21 (Canada); Polydor (France)
- Songwriters: Daniel Joseph, Geraldine Hunt
- Producers: Freddie James, Geraldine Hunt

"Murphy's Law," is the name of a single by the Canadian/American female dance music duo Chéri.

== Chart history ==
"Murphy's Law" went to number 1 Billboard Hot Dance Club Play Chart and reached the top spot in May 1982 where it stayed for three weeks. The single also reached number 5 on the soul chart, reached the UK top twenty (#13), and entered the Billboard Hot 100 chart, where it peaked at number 39.

Chart (1982)	Peak position
Ireland (IRMA)	15
UK singles chart	13
US Billboard Hot 100	39
US Billboard Dance/Disco	1
US Billboard R&B singles	5
US Cash Box Top 100	37

== Track listings ==
7" (US)

- A Murphy's Law (Remix) (3:53)
- B Murphy's Law (Instrumental) (3:51)

12" (US)

- A Murphy's Law (6:42)
- B Murphy's Law (6:27)

== See also ==
- List of Billboard number-one dance singles of 1982
