= Can't Fake the Feeling =

Single by Geraldine Hunt

from the album No Way
- B-side: "Look All Around"
- Released: 1980
- Recorded: 1980
- Genre: Disco
- Length: 3:20 (7"); 5:20 (12")
- Label: Prism Records
- Songwriters: Geraldine Hunt; Kathleen Dyson
- Producer: Mike Pabon Austin

"Can't Fake the Feeling" is 1980 funk single written by Geraldine Hunt and Kathleen Dyson It was performed by Geraldine Hunt and is a track from her album, No Way.

== Chart performance ==
The single hit number one on the dance chart in the United States for seven weeks and peaked at number 58 on the soul singles chart. In the UK Singles Chart, "Can't Fake the Feeling" peaked at number 44.
