= Cowrite =

International screenwriting competition

Cowrite is an international screenwriting competition in which writers throughout the world collaborate on a movie script based on a posted story premise. Contestants enter their 10-15 page increment for the screenplay based on previous contestants' submissions. Every other week, the Cowrite judges select the best submission and post it on the Cowrite website until the script is complete. The project is being produced in association with Benderspink, the management and production company whose credits include The Hangover (film) and American Pie (film).

The story line is described as a Jason Bourne-style feature with a geeky teenage protagonist who finds himself in a world of danger, with the ex-CIA agent he enlists by his side.
