= Red Sun in the Sky =

Propagandic Chinese communist song

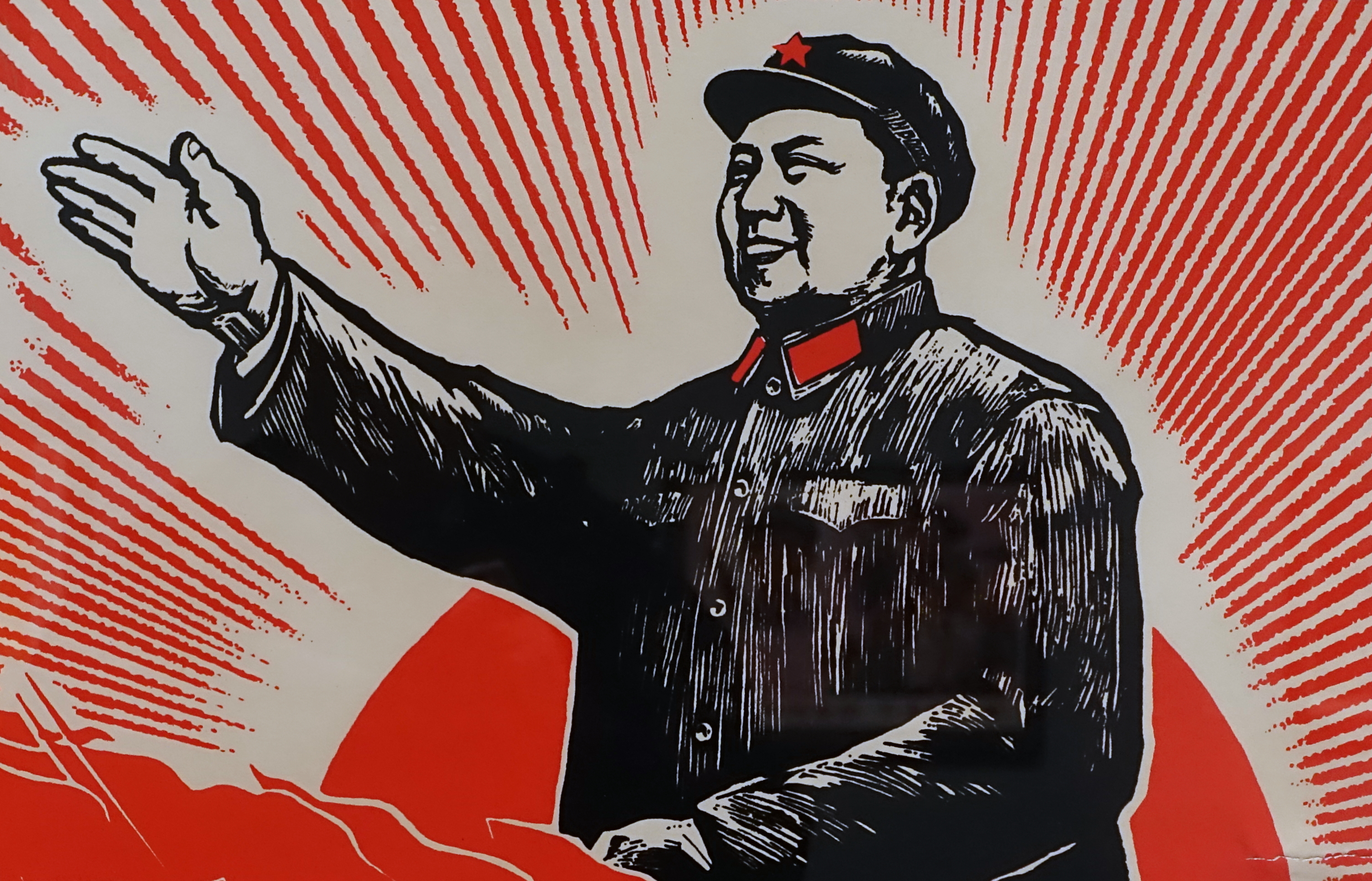
1968 lithograph of Chairman Mao Zedong.

"Red Sun in the Sky" (Chinese: 天上太阳红彤彤; pinyin: Tiānshàng tàiyáng hóng tōngtōng) is a 1974 Chinese Communist revolutionary song. It is meant to honor Mao Zedong, Communism, and the Cultural Revolution, as well as the broader phenomenon of Mao Zedong's cult of personality, where Mao was frequently portrayed as a radiant "red sun" guiding the nation and the people who follow him.

== Background ==
"Red Sun in the Sky" was written by Xu Wenjing and composed by Song Yang. The song was adapted from the Jiangxi folk song "Ballad of Picking Tea", which is part of the wider tradition known as Tea-picking operas. The phrase "red sun" was a prominent metaphor used in various songs and propaganda materials to glorify Mao Zedong.

== Adaptations and legacy ==
After the Chinese Civil War, Song Yang and another musician, Yi Yang, adapted "Red Sun in the Sky" into a four-part harmony in Changsha. By that time, the song was already widely distributed. The third volume of the album New Songs from the Battlefield, (Note: Chinese: 战地新歌; pinyin: Zhàndì xīngē) released in May 1974, included "Red Sun in the Sky". "The Red Sun: Odes to Mao Zedong", released in 1991, also includes this song. Singer Tiger Hu (formerly known as Anson Hu) also sang this song, which was included on the EP Red Song, released in 2009. From 2021 onwards, "Red Sun in the Sky" has become an internet meme, with remixes of the song being sung by AI versions of Donald Trump and SpongeBob SquarePants achieving popularity on YouTube and TikTok.

== See also ==
- Four Olds
- Red Guard
- Propaganda in China
- The East Is Red
- Model opera
