= Geraldine Hunt =

American R&B singer (1945–2022)

- Born: Geraldine Milligan; February 10, 1945; St. Louis, Missouri, U.S.
- Died: October 27, 2022 (aged 77)
- Genres: R&B, jazz, disco
- Occupations: Singer, songwriter, record producer
- Years active: 1962–2022
- Website: geraldinehunt.com (archived)

Geraldine Hunt (née Milligan; February 10, 1945 – October 27, 2022) was an American-Canadian R&B singer best known for the 1980 No. 1 Hot Dance Music/Club Play hit "Can't Fake the Feeling".

== Early life ==
Hunt's parents are Rosie Lee Vickers and Frank Milligan. Her father was a one-man band, and her grandmother, Louella Reed, was a singer on the Chitlin Circuit. In 1947 her family relocated to Chicago. While growing up on Chicago's south side Hunt discovered her musical talent. Living in that part of Chicago was not easy; recalls Geraldine. "On the weekends, we had to sleep on the floor, gangs were shooting through the house; I had been beaten up at gunpoint once, It was rough. We were living below middle class."

Despite the bleak living conditions of her childhood, there were bright spots also. A notable time in her life was her years at Hyde Park High School. Her classmate and best friend at school was the late American soul singer-songwriter Minnie Riperton. Besides Hunt and Riperton, the school also produced a girl group called "Coffee" who covered Ruby Andrews' "Casanova" in 1980.

== Career ==
Hunt began her recording career as a teenager with several singles released from 1962: she had her first glimmer of success in 1970 when "You & I" a duet with Charlie Hodges reached No. 45 on the R&B chart in Billboard and in 1972 Hunt's remake of "Baby I Need Your Loving" reached No. 47 R&B.

In 1975, Hunt relocated to Montreal, Quebec where she recorded her first album in 1978, the disco-oriented Sweet Honesty. In 1980, Hunt's second album No Way yielded the track "Can't Fake the Feeling" which reached No. 1 on the club chart in Billboard where it spent a total of seven weeks: with top 40 radio then being disco-resistant "Can't Fake the Feeling" had a small mainstream success reaching No. 58 R&B. However the track did afford Hunt a hit in France at No. 10 and charted in the UK at No. 44.

In 1982, she helped write and produce some of the music for Chéri.

In 2014, Hunt was honored for her contributions to composing and publishing music at the 25th Anniversary SOCAN Montreal Gala Celebrates Music Creators and Publishers.

== Personal life and death ==
Hunt was the mother of three children; Rosalind Hunt of the musical group Chéri, singer Freddie James and professor/writer Jeanne Croteau. She had seven grandchildren.

According to an announcement from her son Freddie, Hunt died on October 27, 2022; her cause of death was not disclosed.

== Discography ==
=== Studio albums ===
- Sweet Honesty (1978)
- No Way (1980)

=== Compilation albums ===
- Can't Fake the Feeling (1993)

=== Singles ===
Year	Single	Peak chart positions			
Year	Single	US Dance	US R&B	FRA	UK
1962	"I Let Myself Go"	―	―	―	―
1963	"Sneak Around"	―	―	―	―
1970	"You and I" (with Charlie Hodges)	―	45	―	―
1970	"Never, Never Leave Me"	―	―	―	―
1972	"Cold Blood"	―	―	―	―
1972	"Baby, I Need Your Loving"	―	47	―	―
1973	"You Brought Joy"	―	78	―	―
1977	"Don't Take Your Love Away"	―	―	―	―
1978	"Hang On to Love"	―	―	―	―
1978	"Hot-Blooded Woman"	―	―	―	―
1980	"No Way"	―	―	―	―
1980	"I Feel Like a Woman Again"	―	―	―	―
1980	"Can't Fake the Feeling"	1	58	10	44
1981	"Heart Heart" (with Charles Marotta)	17	67	―	―
1981	"It Doesn't Only Happen at Night"	―	―	―	―
"—" denotes releases that did not chart or were not released in that territory.

== See also ==
- List of number-one dance hits (United States)
- List of artists who reached number one on the US Dance chart
