= Chéri (band) =

Canadian female dance music duo

- Origin: Montreal, Quebec, Canada
- Genres: R&B, boogie
- Years active: 1982–1983
- Past members: Rosalind Hunt; Lise Cullerier

Chéri was a Canadian female dance music duo from Montreal, consisting of American Rosalind Milligan Hunt and Canadian Lise Cullerier. They had one Billboard top 40 hit, "Murphy's Law", in 1982.

== History ==
Friends Hunt and Cullerier began singing together at the suggestion of Hunt's mother, singer Geraldine Hunt. Calling their duo Chéri, in 1982 they recorded a single, "Murphy's Law", which became their only Billboard Hot 100 entry, peaking at #39. The song also hit number-one on the Billboard Hot Dance Music/Club Play chart and is notable for its speed-up vocal chorus ("got it all together, dontcha baby"). The song was written by Geraldine Hunt and Daniel Joseph, and released on Venture Records.

Chéri continued to record, following up with another single "Give It to Me Baby", and also that year released an album, Murphy's Law, which included the hit single. Some of Chéri's recordings featured Amy Roslyn instead of Cullerier.

In 1983 the band released the album Love Stew through the label 21 Records.

== Discography ==
=== Albums ===
- Chéri (21 Records, 1982) (Canada only)
- Murphy's Law (Venture Records, 1982) (US only)
- Love Stew (21 Records, 1983)

=== Singles ===
| Year | Single | Peak chart positions | | | | Album |
| Year | Single | US Pop | US Dance | US R&B | UK | Album |
|---|---|---|---|---|---|---|
| 1982 | "Murphy's Law" | 39 | 1 | 5 | 13 | Cheri |
| 1982 | "Give It to Me Baby" | — | 57 | 53 | — | Cheri |
| 1982 | "Star Struck" | — | — | — | — | Cheri |
| 1982 | "Come and Get These Memories" | — | — | — | — | Cheri |
| 1983 | "Working Girl" | — | 27 | 40 | — | Love Stew |
| 1983 | "Small Town Lover" | — | — | 56 | — | Love Stew |
"—" denotes releases that did not chart

== See also ==
- List of Billboard number-one dance club songs
- List of artists who reached number one on the U.S. Dance Club Songs chart
