= Juan Luis Guerra discography =

- Studio albums: 14
- EPs: 2
- Live albums: 2
- Compilation albums: 11
- Singles: 55
- Music videos: 47

The Dominican singer, songwriter and producer Juan Luis Guerra has released 14 studio albums, two live albums, two EPs, 55 singles and 46 music videos. He is one of the best selling Latin artist of all time with more 30 millions of records worldwide. He made his debut with his first studio album Soplando, released in 1984. He later released his second studio album in 1985, Mundanza y Acarreo which was his first national success and marked his first entry at the US Billboard Charts at number seventeen on Billboard Tropical Charts. In 1987, his third studio album Mientras Más lo Pienso... Tú become his first work to gain international attention in countries such as Venezuela and Puerto Rico. Between this last two albums, it sold over two million copies worldwide.

Juan Luis Guerra's fourth studio album, Ojalá Que Llueva Café receivef universal acclaim by critics and is considered by many to be his most important work. The album sold over 2.5 million copies worldwide & established him as a superstar throughout Latin America and Europe. It peaked at the Top 10 in Spain, Puerto Rico and Argentina and also at the top 10 of US Cashbox charts and Billboard Tropical Charts. In 1990, His followup album, Bachata Rosa, is Guerra's most successful album, helping to launch Bachata and Merengue to mainstrean and international audiences. It remained at the number one for 24 weeks on US Billboard Tropical Charts and was the best selling tropical album of 1991 and breaking sales record and topping the charts Mexico, Spain, Chile, Argentina, Portugal, Holland and Belgium. Four of the singles released became top-ten hits on the Billboard Hot Latin Songs chart. It was certified platinum (Latin field) in the United States by the Recording Industry Association of America (RIAA), Gold in Brazil, 7 times Platinum in Spain and Gold in Netherlands. Eventually, it sold more than 5 million copies worldwide and is one of the Best Selling Latin Albums of All Time.

He later released he sixth studio album Areíto in 1992, which contained his first number one single on Billboard Hot Latin Songs El Costo de la vida, receive limited commercial success in comparation of his last record. However, it sold over two million copies worldwide, peaked at the number two in Spain and the top 10 of US Billboard Tropical and Latin Albums Charts. In the same way it was certified Gold in Argentina, Colombia and Mexico and Platinum in Spain and Venezuela. His next album Fogaraté (1994) debuted at the top 20 Portugal and Netherlands and Top 10 in US Billboard Charts and Chile and Puerto Rico. Sales, however, were significantly less than the two previous studio albums. Juan Luis Guerra y 4:40 released a greatest hits album titled Grandes Éxitos Juan Luis Guerra y 440 in 1995, which was certified three time platinum in Spain.

After a hiatus of more than three years due personal issues, Ni Es lo Mismo Ni Es Igual, Guerra's eight studio album, was released in 1998 sold over one million of copies and peaked number four on the Top Latin Albums and number two on the Tropical Albums chart and received a doble-patlinum certification (Latin Field) by RIAA for selling over 400,000 copies. In 2001, he released Colección Romántica which contains re-recorded versions of his earlier hits. It sold 50,000 copies in it first week in Spain and was platinum certification (Latin Field) by RIAA for selling over 100,000 copies. In 2004, he released Para Ti, his first Christian album and hist ninth album overall. It debuted number 110 on Billboard 200 and topped the Billboard Latin charts and was certified three times platinum certification (Latin Field) by RIAA for selling over 300,000 copies.

In 2007, Juan Luis Guerra released the 10th studio La Llave de Mi Corazón which become his first album to debut at number one on Billboard Latin Albums charts and was a success in Latin America where it was certified gold and platinum. His next album, A Son de Guerra (2010), debuted at the top of Spanish and Uruguay charts and was certified gold by AMPROFON for selling 30,000 copies in Mexico and platinum by RIAA for selling over 100,000 copies. He later released his second Christian album Colección Cristiana in 2012 and his first live album A Son de Guerra Tour debuted and peaked at number 80 on the Billboard 200 and number one of Billboard Latin Albums. It was certified gold by AMPROFON for selling 30,000 copies in Mexico. In the same way was certified gold in Ecuador and Colombia.

Todo Tiene Su Hora was released by Capitol Latin in 2014 and debuted at number 65 on the U.S. Billboard 200 and at number one on the Billboard Top Latin Albums chart, selling 6,000 copies in its first week. It was received a Latin album gold certification by the Recording Industry Association of America (RIAA) for shipping 30,000 copies and gold by PROMUSICAE for selling 20,000 units in Spain. His 14th studio album, Literal, was released by Universal Music Latin in 2019. In 2020 he released his first EP Prive and his second live album, Entre Mar y Palmeras, the subsequent year.

== Albums ==
=== Studio albums ===
Title	Year	Charts						Sales	Certifications
Title	Year	MEX	NL	SPA	US	US Latin	US Tropical	Sales	Certifications
Soplando	1984	—	—	—	—	—	—		
Mudanza y Acarreo	1985	—	—	—	—	—	17		
Mientras Más lo Pienso... Tú	1987	—	—	—	—	—	—		
Ojalá Que Llueva Café	1989	—	—	2	—	40	2	World: 2,500,000	PROMUSICAE: 4× Platinum
Bachata Rosa	1990	1	1	1	—	19	1	World: 9,000,000; US: 500,000; MEX: 1,000,000; SPA: 1,000,000	RIAA: Platinum (Latin); Pro-Música Brasil: Gold; NVPI: Gold; PROMUSICAE: 7× Platinum
Areíto	1992	—	67	2	—	9	2	World: 2,000,000; MEX: 120,000	PROMUSICAE: 3× Platinum; AMPROFON: Gold
Fogaraté	1994	—	18	1	—	3	2	US: 200,000	PROMUSICAE: Platinum
Ni Es lo Mismo Ni Es Igual	1998	—	—	17	—	4	2	World: 1,000,000; US: 450,000; SPA: 100,000	RIAA: 2× Platinum (Latin); PROMUSICAE: Platinum
Para Ti	2004	—	—	41	110	2	1	World: 500,000; US: 300,000; SPA: 20,000	CAPIF: Gold; RIAA: 3× Platinum (Latin)
La Llave de Mi Corazón	2007	63	77	12	77	1	1	US: 167,000; SPA: 100,000	CAPIF: Platinum; PROMUSICAE: Gold; ASINCOL: 4× Platinum
A Son de Guerra	2010	16	—	1	52	2	1	US: 100,000; MEX: 30,000	RIAA: Platinum (Latin); APFV: Platinum; AMPROFON: Gold
Colección Cristiana	2012	—	—	41	—	6	2		ASINCOL: Platinum
Todo Tiene Su Hora	2014	—	—	16	65	1	1	World: 400,000	PROMUSICAE: Gold
Literal	2019	—	—	17	—	31	7		
Albums that did not chart are denoted with an "—".

=== Live albums ===
Title	Year	Charts			Certifications
Title	Year	US	US Latin	US Tropical	Certifications
A Son de Guerra Tour	2013	80	1	1	AMPROFON: Gold; ASINCOL: Gold; IFPIE: Gold
Entre Mar y Palmeras	2021	—	—	8	

=== Compilation albums ===
Title	Year	Charts				Certifications
Title	Year	NL	SPA	US Latin	US Tropical	Certifications
Éxitos	1988	—	—	—	—	-
Los Grandes Éxitos	1990	—	—	—	—	
Grandes Éxitos	1995	13	3	10	2	PROMUSICAE: 3× Platinum
Colección Romántica	2000	—	—	6	1	RIAA: Platinum (Latin); PROMUSICAE: Gold
The Collection	2000	—	—	—	—	
Universo Latino 1	2001	—	—	—	—	
Archivo Digital 4.4	2007	—	—	44	6	
Burbujas de Amor: 30 Grandes Canciones Románticas	2010	—	18	—	—	
¡Que Suba la Bilirrubina!	2011	—	41	—	—	
Antología	2011	—	79	—	—	
Quisiera Ser un Pez...: Los Grandes Éxitos	2012	—	42	—	—	

== EPs ==
Title	Year
Privé	2020
Radio Güira	2023

== Singles ==
=== As lead artist ===
Year	Title	Charts					Certifications	Album
Year	Title	SPA	US	US Latin	US Tropical	US Latin Pop	Certifications	Album
1989	"Ojalá Que Llueva Café"	—	—	21	—	—		Ojalá Que Llueva Café
1989	"Como Abeja al Panal"	—	—	31	—	—		Bachata Rosa
1990	"La Bilirrubina"	—	—	9	—	—	PROMUSICAE: Platinum	Bachata Rosa
1990	"Burbujas de Amor"	—	—	2	—	—	PROMUSICAE: Gold	Bachata Rosa
1990	"A Pedir Su Mano"	—	—	13	—	—		Bachata Rosa
1991	"Estrellitas y Duendes"	—	—	3	—	—		Bachata Rosa
1991	"Bachata Rosa"	7	—	15	—	25	PROMUSICAE: Gold	Bachata Rosa
1991	"Carta de Amor"	—	—	35	—	—		Bachata Rosa
1991	"Frío Frío"	—	—	4	—	—		Areíto
1992	"Señales de Humo"	—	—	6	—	—		Areíto
1992	"El Costo de la Vida"	—	—	1	—	—		Areíto
1993	"Mal de Amor"	—	—	4	—	—		Areíto
1993	"Coronita de Flores"	—	—	4	—	—		Areíto
1993	"Rompiendo Fuente"	—	—	27	—	—		Areíto
1994	"Cuando Te Beso"	—	—	28	—	—		Areíto
1994	"La Cosquillita"	1	—	6	—	—		Fogaraté
1994	"Viviré"	—	—	5	—	1		Fogaraté
1995	"El Beso de la Ciguatera"	—	—	17	6	5		Fogaraté
1998	"Mi PC"	9	—	1	1	2		Ni Es lo Mismo Ni Es Igual
1999	"Palomita Blanca"	—	—	1	1	3		Ni Es lo Mismo Ni Es Igual
1999	"El Niágara en Bicicleta"	—	—	2	2	4	PROMUSICAE: Gold	Ni Es lo Mismo Ni Es Igual
1999	"La Hormiguita"	—	—	—	39	33		Ni Es lo Mismo Ni Es Igual
2001	"Tú"	—	—	28	7	21		Colección Romántica
2001	"Quisiera"	—	—	33	26	19		Colección Romántica
2004	"Las Avispas"	—	122	4	1	8	PROMUSICAE: Gold	Para Ti
2004	"Para Ti"	—	—	17	1	16		Para Ti
2005	"Los Dinteles"	—	—	—	34	—		Para Ti
2007	"La Llave de Mi Corazón"	—	114	1	1	2		La Llave de Mi Corazón
2007	"Que Me Des Tu Cariño"	—	—	2	1	5		La Llave de Mi Corazón
2007	"La Travesía"	—	120	3	1	3	PROMUSICAE: Gold	La Llave de Mi Corazón
2008	"Solo Tengo Ojos para Ti"	—	—	28	—	9		La Llave de Mi Corazón
2008	"Como Yo"	—	—	18	1	13		La Llave de Mi Corazón
2010	"Bachata en Fukuoka"	—	116	1	1	1	PROMUSICAE: Platinum	A Son de Guerra
2010	"La Guagua"	—	—	23	7	10		A Son de Guerra
2010	"La Calle" (featuring Juanes)	—	—	26	—	9		A Son de Guerra
2010	"Lola's Mambo" (featuring Chris Botti)	—	—	—	29	36		A Son de Guerra
2011	"Mi Bendición"	—	—	42	—	12	PROMUSICAE: Gold	A Son de Guerra
2011	"Apaga y Vámonos"	—	—	—	—	29		A Son de Guerra
2012	"En el Cielo No Hay Hospital"	—	—	20	22	5		Colección Cristiana
2012	"El Quita Pena"	—	—	—	—	—		Colección Cristiana
2013	"Frío Frío" (Live) (featuring Romeo Santos)	—	—	16	17	—		A Son de Guerra Tour
2014	"Tus Besos"	44	—	8	1	1	SPA: Gold	Todo Tiene Su Hora
2015	"Todo Tiene Su Hora"	—	—	46	—	35	RIAA: Gold	Todo Tiene Su Hora
2015	"Muchachita Linda"	—	—	23	35	14		Todo Tiene Su Hora
2019	"Kitipun"	—	—	—	4	25		Literal
2019	"Corazón Enamorado"	—	—	—	—	—		Literal
2019	"I Love You More"	—	—	—	—	—		Literal
2019	"Lámpara Pa' Mis Pies"	—	—	—	—	—		Literal
2020	"Pambiche de Novia"	—	—	—	—	—		Privé
2021	"Rosalia (Live)"	—	—	—	—	—		Entre Mar y Palmeras
2021	"El Farolito (Live)"	—	—	—	—	—		Entre Mar y Palmeras
2021	"Vale la Pena (Live)"	—	—	—	—	—		Entre Mar y Palmeras
2023	"Mambo 23"	—	—	—	1	—		Radio Güira
2023	"La Noviecita"	—	—	—	10	—		Radio Güira
2024	"DJ Bachata"	—	—	—	—	—		Radio Güira
2025	"Estrellitas y Duendes" (with Sting)	—	—	—	24	—		non-album

=== As guest artist ===
Year	Title	Charts					Album
Year	Title	SPA	US	US Latin	US Latin Pop	US Tropical	Album
2006	"Abriendo Caminos" (Diego Torres featuring Juan Luis Guerra)	—	—	30	9	—	Andando
2006	"Bendita Tu Luz" (Maná featuring Juan Luis Guerra)	—	102	1	1	—	Amar Es Combatir
2010	"Cuando Me Enamoro" (Enrique Iglesias featuring Juan Luis Guerra)	6	89	1	1	1	Euphoria
2014	"Llegaste Tú" (Luis Fonsi featuring Juan Luis Guerra)	—	—	23	6	27	8
2018	"Carmín" (Romeo Santos featuring Juan Luis Guerra)	—	—	—	—	—	Golden
2024	"Si Tú Me Quieres" (Fonseca featuring Juan Luis Guerra)	—	—	—	—	—	Tropicalia
Songs that did not chart are denoted with an "—".

=== Collaborations ===
Year	Song	Artist	Album
1990	"No He Podido Verte"	Emmanuel	Vida
1993	"Derroche"	Ana Belén	Veneno para el Corazón
1994	"Qué Bonita Luna"	Various Artists	El Espíritu de un Pueblo
1995	"Señorita"	Various Artists	My Family – The Original Motion Picture Soundtrack
2001	"El Último Adiós (The Last Goodbye)"	Various Artists	non-album
2006	"Bendita Tu Luz"	Maná	Amar Es Combatir
2006	"Abriendo Caminos"	Diego Torres	Andando
2006	"Amor de Conuco"	Michel Camilo & Tomatito	Spain Again
2007	"Bendita Tu Luz (Bachata Version)"	Maná	Amar Es Combatir – Deluxe Limited Edition
2007	"Não Tenho Lágrimas (feat. Ivete Sangalo)"	Various Artists	Cidade do Samba
2009	"Como Lluvia"	Nelly Furtado	Mi Plan
2010	"Cuando Me Enamoro"	Enrique Iglesias	Euphoria
2011	"Dime Dónde"	Gianmarco	Días Nuevos
2011	"Toma Mi Vida"	Milly Quezada	Aquí Estoy Yo
2011	"Mi Son"	Rosario Flores	Raskatriski
2011	"Tu Nombre"	Marcos Vidal	Tu Nombre
2012	"Creo en Ti"	Miguel Bosé	PapiTwo
2012	"Just in Time"	Tony Bennett	Viva Duets
2013	"Esto Es Vida"	Draco Rosa	Vida
2013	"Bachata Rosa"	Natalie Cole	Natalie Cole en Español
2014	"Llegaste Tú"	Luis Fonsi	8
2015	"Suena la Pelota"	Alejandro Sanz	Sirope
2017	"Carmín"	Romeo Santos	Golden
2017	"Júrame"	Julio Iglesias	México & Amigos
2017	"Almost Like Praying"	Various Artists	Almost Like Praying
2018	"Si No Te Hubieras Ido (feat. David Bisbal)"	Various Artists	Todos Somos MÁS
2018	"La Bilirrubina"	Arturo Sandoval	Ultimate Duets
2018	"Quiero Tiempo"	Victor Manuelle	25/7
2018	"Loma de Cayenas"	Vicente García	Candela
2020	"Dance with Me"	Carol Welsman	Dance with Me

== Music videos ==
Year	Title	Album
1989	"Ojalá Que Llueva Café"	Ojalá Que Llueva Café
1990	"Burbujas de Amor"	Bachata Rosa
1990	"A Pedir Su Mano"	Bachata Rosa
1992	"El Costo de la Vida"	Areíto
1993	"Mal de Amor"	Areíto
1993	"Coronita de Flores"	Areíto
1994	"La Cosquillita"	Fogaraté
1994	"Viviré"	Fogaraté
1999	"Palomita Blanca"	Ni Es lo Mismo Ni Es Igual
1999	"El Niágara en Bicicleta"	Ni Es lo Mismo Ni Es Igual
1999	"La Hormiguita"	Ni Es lo Mismo Ni Es Igual
2001	"Quisiera"	Colección Romántica
2004	"Las Avispas"	Para Ti
2007	"La Llave de Mi Corazón"	La Llave de Mi Corazón
2007	"Que Me Des Tu Cariño"	La Llave de Mi Corazón
2007	"La Travesía"	La Llave de Mi Corazón
2010	"Bachata en Fukuoka"	A Son de Guerra
2010	"La Guagua"	A Son de Guerra
2010	"Mi Bendición"	A Son de Guerra
2010	"La Calle" (with Juanes)	A Son de Guerra
2011	"Lola's Mambo"	A Son de Guerra
2012	"En el Cielo No Hay Hospital"	Colección Cristiana
2014	"Tus Besos"	Todo Tiene Su Hora
2015	"Todo Tiene Su Hora"	Todo Tiene Su Hora
2015	"Muchachita Linda"	Todo Tiene Su Hora
2019	"Kitipun"	Literal
2019	"I Love You More"	Literal
2019	"Lámpara Pa' Mis Pies"	Literal
2023	"Mambo 23"	Radio Güira
2023	"La Noviecita"	Radio Güira
2025	"Estrellitas y Duendes" (with Sting)	non-album

== Collaborations in music videos ==
Year	Title	Other Performer	Album
1990	"No He Podido Verte"	Emmanuel	Vida
1993	"Derroche"	Ana Belén	Veneno para el Corazón
2001	"El Último Adiós (The Last Goodbye)"	Various artists	non-album
2006	"Abriendo Caminos"	Diego Torres	Andando
2006	"Bendita Tu Luz" (2 versions)	Maná	Amar Es Combatir
2010	"Como Lluvia"	Nelly Furtado	Mi Plan
2010	"Cuando Me Enamoro"	Enrique Iglesias	Euphoria
2011	"Toma Mi Vida"	Milly Quezada	Aquí Estoy Yo
2012	"Mi Son"	Rosario Flores	Raskatriski
2013	"Esto Es Vida"	Draco Rosa	Vida
2014	"Llegaste Tú"	Luis Fonsi	8
2017	"Si No Te Hubieras Ido"	David Bisbal	Todos Somos MÁS
2018	"Carmín"	Romeo Santos	Golden
2018	"Loma de Cayenas"	Vicente García	Candela
2020	"Dance with Me"	Carol Welsman	Dance with Me
2024	"Si Tú Me Quieres"	Fonseca	Tropicalia
