= Visa Para Un Sueño =

Single by Juan Luis Guerra

from the album Ojalá Que Llueva Café
- B-side: "Como Abeja al Panal"
- Released: 1989
- Recorded: 1988–89
- Genre: Merengue
- Length: 3:28
- Label: Karen Records

Juan Luis Guerra singles chronology
"Reina Mía" (1989)	"Visa Para Un Sueño" (1989)	"Woman del Callao" (1989)

Visa Para Un Sueño (English: Visa for a dream) is the third single by Dominican artist Juan Luis Guerra and his band 440 from their fourth studio album Ojalá Que Llueva Café. Initially released by Karen Records in the Dominican Republic in 1989, it was released a year later in Spain. The track is a merengue providing a social commentary about the difficulties of obtaining a United States visa order to find work, better living conditions, and escape the poverty of third world countries, as well as being about the state of mind that many Dominicans have. The track was inspired by the illegal trips many Dominicans take to Puerto Rico every year to find better living and working conditions.

The track is considered one of Guerra's classic hits and has been on the set list of every tour since Ojalá Que Llueva Café Tour (1990–91). The song reached first place in some territories of Latin America, with the track eventually receiving moderate airplay in Spain in 1991. The track is included on the compilation Grandes Éxitos Juan Luis Guerra y 440 (1995). It was also covered live on the albums A Son de Guerra Tour (2013) and Entre Mar y Palmeras (2021). Initially the track was released as a double along with Como Abeja Al Panal in 1989. The track was released as a double along with Ojalá Que Llueva Café in Colombia and a B-side of La Gallera in the Dominican Republic.

== Tracklist ==
- Dominican Republic 7", 45 RPM Single (1989)
  - Side A: Visa Para Un Sueño
  - Side B: Como Abeja al Panal
- Spain 7", 45 RPM Single (1990)
  1. Visa Para Un Sueño
  2. La Gallera

== Charts ==
Chart (1991)	Peak position
Peru (UPI)	6
