= Grandes Éxitos Juan Luis Guerra y 440 =

Grande Éxitos de Juan Luis Guerra 4.40

Greatest hits album by Juan Luis Guerra
- Released: 1995
- Recorded: 1988–1994
- Genre: Merengue, bachata
- Length: 62:24
- Label: Karem Records

Juan Luis Guerra chronology
Fogaraté (1994)	Grande Éxitos de Juan Luis Guerra 4.40 (1995)	Ni es lo mismo ni es igual (1998)

Grandes Éxitos de Juan Luis Guerra y 440 or simply Grandes Éxitos is a compilation album of Dominican singer-songwriter Juan Luis Guerra, and his band 440 released in July 1995 by Karem Records. It contained Guerra's fifteen biggest hits from 1988 to 1994 on the original version and from the albums Mudanza y Acarreo (1985) to Fogarate! (1994) on the international versions. The compilation received positive reviews by the critics.

Among the tracks are two songs from the controversial album Áreito that was said to have anti-capitalist tendencies. Although Guerra decided to quit recording protest songs, he included these two tracks, of which El costo de la vida was his first number-one hit in the Hot Latin Tracks. On September 17, 1996, the album was re-released to include the two tracks "Si tu te vas" (Guerra first merengue song) and "Señorita", a track that he composed for the movie "My Family".

The album was commercial success and reached the Top 10 in Argentina, Chile, Spain and US Billboard Latin Charts. It also, peaked at the Top 20 of Netherlands and Portugal and was certified platinum on Spain and Argentina. In the United States, it was the 7th best selling tropical albums of 1996. According to some sources, it sold 7 million of copies worldwide.

== Background and composition ==
Grandes Exitos de Juan Luis Guerra y 440 compiles a marvelous array of highlights from the Dominican icon's late-'80s and early-'90s rise to fame. Guerra's career began to peak with his fourth album, Ojalá Que Llueva Café (1989). Three songs from that album ("Visa Para un Sueño," "Ojalá Que Llueva Café," "Woman del Callao") are compiled on the record. Seven of the ten songs from fifth album Bachata Rosa (1990) are compiled here ("Rosalía," "Como Abeja al Panal," "Carta de Amor," "A Pedir Su Mano," "La Bilirrubina," "Burbujas de Amor," "Bachata Rosa").

From his sixth studio album Areito, it includes the particular the hit singles "Frio Frio" and "El Costo de la Vida". "Guavaberry" from his LP Mientras mas lo pienso... Tu (1987) is included. From his seventh studio album "Fogarate!", the only song included is "La Cosquillita".

== Track listing ==
All tracks are written by Juan Luis Guerra.

1995 USA stardand Version
No.	Title	Length
1.	"El Costo de la Vida"	4:12
2.	"Rosalía"	3:26
3.	"Si Tú Te Vas"	4:22
4.	"Visa Para en Sueño"	3:29
5.	"Burbujas de Amor"	4:10
6.	"Ojalá Que Llueva Café"	4:12
7.	"Me Enamoro de Ella"	4:17
8.	"Frío Frío"	4:09
9.	"Como Abeja al Panal"	4:05
10.	"A Pedir Su Mano"	4:56
11.	"La Bilirrubina"	4:05
12.	"Carta de Amor"	4:41
13.	"Bachata Rosa"	4:18
14.	"Guavaberry"	4:20
15.	"La Cosquillita"	3:42
Total length:		62:02

1996 International Version
No.	Title	Length
1.	"El Costo de la Vida"	4:12
2.	"Rosalía"	3:26
3.	"Woman del Callao"	4:22
4.	"Visa Para en Sueño"	4:29
5.	"Burbujas de Amor"	4:10
6.	"Ojalá Que Llueva Café"	4:12
7.	"Me Enamoro de Ella"	4:17
8.	"Frío Frío"	4:09
9.	"Como Abeja al Panal"	4:05
10.	"A Pedir Su Mano"	4:56
11.	"La Bilirrubina"	4:05
12.	"Carta de Amor"	4:41
13.	"Bachata Rosa"	4:18
14.	"Guavaberry"	4:20
15.	"La Cosquillita"	3:42
16.	"Si tu te vas"	3:46
17.	"Señorita"	4:11
Total length:		70:10

== Personnel ==
The following credits are from AllMusic and from the Grandes Exitos de Juan Luis Guerra 4.40 liner notes:

- Julio Cesar Delgado - Composer
- Diblo Dibala - Composer
- Juan Luis Guerra - Composer, Primary Artist
- Julio Hiraldo - Graphic Design
- Lea Lignanzy - Composer
- Elena Ramírez - Graphic Design
- Francisco Ulloa - Composer

== Charts ==
Weekly chart performance for Grandes Éxitos Juan Luis Guerra y 440
Chart (1995)	Peak position
Argetinan Albums (CAPIF)	3
Chilean Albums (IFPI)	6
European Albums (Top 100)	39
Netherlands (Mega Album Top 100)	13
Spanish Albums (PROMUSICAE)	3
Portuguese Albums (AFP)	19
US Top Latin Albums (Billboard)	10
US Tropical Albums (Billboard)	2
Chart (2004)	Peak position
Argentine Albums (CAPIF)	10
Chart (2011)	Peak position
Peruan Albums (Phantom)	12

== Certifications ==
Region	Certification	Certified units/sales
Argentina (CAPIF)	Platinum	60,000^{^}
Spain (PROMUSICAE)	3× Platinum	300,000^{^}
^{^} Shipments figures based on certification alone.
