= Rosalía (Juan Luis Guerra song) =

Song by Juan Luis Guerra

from the album Bachata Rosa
- Recorded: 1990
- Genre: Merengue
- Length: 3:26
- Label: Karen Records
- Composer: Juan Luis Guerra

"Rosalía" is a song recorded by Dominican singer Juan Luis Guerra for his seventh studio album, Bachata Rosa (1990), included as its first and opening track. It was composed and produced by Juan Luis Guerra and his band 4.40. The track is an upbeat merengue about a lover named Rosalia. The track contains poetic metaphors and lyrics describing that he loves her. Following the success of Bachata Rosa, the track charted inside of Panama Airplay. Eventually, the track was included on the live album Entre Mar y Palmeras (2021) and served as the opening track on the setlist of the tour of the same name.

== Charts ==
Chart (1991)	Peak position
Panama (UPI)	5
