= Bachata Rosa (song) =

- Brazilian Version Single Cover

Single by Juan Luis Guerra

from the album Bachata Rosa
- Language: Spanish
- Released: 1991
- Recorded: 1990
- Genre: Bachata
- Length: 4:18
- Label: Karem Records

Juan Luis Guerra singles chronology
"Carta de Amor" (1991)	"Bachata Rosa" (1991)	"Frío Frío" (1991)

"Bachata Rosa" (English: Rose Bachata) is a song by Dominican Republic singer-songwriter Juan Luis Guerra released in 1991 and served as the lead seventh and final from his fifth studio album Bachata Rosa (1990). Along with Estrellitas y Duendes and Como Abeja Al Panal, is one of Guerra's first international hits and helped to contribute to the bachata sophistication and have recognition in Latin America and Europe. The track was a commercial success, topping the airplay charts in Mexico and was the fourth single of the album to peak in the top 10 at the US Hot Latin Tracks.

A Portuguese version of the track was released in 1992 titled Romance Rosa and peaked at number 7 on the Brazilian Airplay Charts. The song "Bachata Rosa" served as the closing theme for the Brazilian TV novel "De Cuerpo y Alma" (1992). The track was included on Guerra's greatest hits album Grandes Éxitos Juan Luis Guerra y 440 and Coleccion Romantica (2001). The song had been covered by many artist and was used of opening song of serverial TV novels. In 2022, during their tour Music of the Spheres World Tour, the British band Coldplay, covered the track on their concert in Santo Domingo.

== Tracklist ==
- Mexico 7", 45 RPM Single 1991
  1. La Bilirrubina – 3:05
  2. Bachata Rosa – 4:14
- Brazil CD Single (1992)
  1. Romance Rosa – 4:13
  2. Burbujas de Amor – 4:06

== Charts ==
Chart (1991–92)	Peak position
Argentina (AP)	10
Brazil (ABPD)	7
Colombia (UPI)	7
Mexico (AMPROFON)	1
Panama (UPI)	6
Paraguay (AP)	5
Uruguay (UPI)	4
US Hot Latin Songs (Billboard)	7
Venezuela (UPI)	6

== See also ==
- List of number-one hits of 1991 (Mexico)
