= Entre Mar y Palmeras =

Live album by Juan Luis Guerra
- Released: June 18, 2021
- Recorded: 2021
- Venues: Esmeralda Beach, Miches, Dominican Republic
- Genres: Merengue; salsa; bachata
- Length: 63:54
- Language: Spanish
- Label: Rimas

Juan Luis Guerra chronology
Privé (2020)	Entre Mar y Palmeras (2021)	Radio Güira (2023)

Singles from Prive
- 1. "Rosalía (Live)" Released: May 28, 2021; 2. "El Farolito (Live)" Released: June 18, 2021; 3. "Vale la Pena (Live)" Released: July 14, 2021

Entre Mar y Palmeras (Between the Sea and Palm Trees) is the second live album of the Dominican artist Juan Luis Guerra. It was released on June 18, 2022 along with special concert, an open-air and audience-free concert, broadcast by HBO special, premiere on June 3, 2021, performing the songs and was recorded at the Esmeralda Beach, Miches in the Dominican Republic. It contains 16 live versions of hits and was directed by Guerra's oldest son, Jean Guerra. The album won Best Long Form Music Video at the 22nd Annual Latin Grammy Awards and Best Merengue/Bachata Album at the 23rd Annual Latin Grammy Awards. Also, it was nominated for Album of the year at the 2022 Lo Nuestro Awards.

The album was supported by the release of three official singles: "Rosalía", "El Farolito" and "Vale la Pena". A billboard at New York's Time Square and series of performances at awards show such as Latin Grammy awards and 2021's Soberano Awards. Subsequently, Guerra embarked in at the Entre Mar y Palmeras Tour in 2022.

== Tracklist ==
No.	Title	Length
1.	"Rosalía"	3:20
2.	"La Travesía"	3:31
3.	"La Llave de Mi Corazón"	3:12
4.	"Vale la Pena"	4:01
5.	"Como Yo"	3:54
6.	"Kitipun"	3:50
7.	"El Niágara en Bicicleta"	3:59
8.	"Para Ti"	3:52
9.	"Medley de Bachatas: I. Estrellitas y Duendes – 1:47; II. Muchachita Linda – 0:33; III. La Hormiguita – 0:38; IV. Bachata en Fukuoka – 0:53; V. Que Me Des Tu Cariño – 0:57; VI. Mi Bendición – 0:41; VII. Frío Frío – 1:04; VIII. Burbujas de Amor – 2:18"	8:57
10.	"Visa Para un Sueño"	3:31
11.	"El Farolito"	4:49
12.	"La Bilirrubina"	4:00
13.	"Las Avispas"	3:19
14.	"Pambiche de Novia"	2:45
15.	"A Pedir Su Mano"	3:04
16.	"Ojalá Que Llueva Café"	3:52
Total length:		63:54

== Charts ==
Chart (2021)	Peak position
US Tropical Albums (Billboard)	8
