= Carta de Amor (song) =

Single by Juan Luis Guerra

from the album Bachata Rosa
- Released: 1991
- Recorded: 1990
- Genre: Salsa
- Length: 4:42
- Label: Karem Records
- Songwriter: Juan Luis Guerra

Juan Luis Guerra singles chronology
"Estrellitas y Duendes" (1991)	"Carta de Amor" (1991)	"Bachata Rosa" (1991)

«Carta de Amor» (English: «Love Letter») is a salsa song by Dominican singer-songwriter Juan Luis Guerra released in 1990 and served as the lead single from his sixth studio album Bachata Rosa (1990). Track talks about how he writes a letter to his lover in his journal, punctuation marks included. It is the second song of the album along with "Como Abeja al Panal" to have salsa approach on the album. It was peaked as a highlight track of the album by Allmusic. It peaked at number 35 on Hot Latin Songs and was included in Guerra's greatest hits album Grandes Éxitos Juan Luis Guerra y 440 (1995).

== Charts ==
Chart (1990–91)	Peak position
US Hot Latin Songs (Billboard)	35
