= La Bilirrubina =

Single by Juan Luis Guerra

from the album Bachata Rosa
- B-side: "Bachata Rosa"
- Released: 1990
- Recorded: 1990
- Genre: Merengue
- Length: 4:05
- Label: Karem Records
- Songwriter: Juan Luis Guerra

Juan Luis Guerra singles chronology
"Como Abeja al Panal" (1990)	"La Bilirrubina" (1990)	"Burbujas de Amor" (1990)

Alternative Cover

"La Bilirrubina" (The Bilirubin) is a song by Dominican singer-songwriter Juan Luis Guerra. It was written by Guerra and released by Karem Records in 1990 and 1991 in Europe as the second single from his fifth studio album, Bachata Rosa. It was nominated for Record of the Year at 1991 Lo Nuestro Awards. The merengue track is considered one of Guerra's signature songs and most popular. It received positive reviews and was listed one of the best tracks of the album.

The track was included on Guerra's greatest hits album Grandes Éxitos Juan Luis Guerra y 440. Live versions of the track had been included on A Son de Guerra Tour (2013) and Entre Mar y Palmeras in 2021. In the United States it was re-released as a double single with "De tu Boca" in 1991. In Europe, it was released as a double single along with track Rosalia. In Colombia, it was released as double single along with Ay Mujer! in 1990.

== Track listing ==
1. La Bilirrubina – 4:05
2. Bachata Rosa – 4:18

== Charts ==
Chart (1990–91)	Peak position
Dominican Republic (UPI)	8
Peru (UPI)	2
Puerto Rico (UPI)	1
Mexico (AMPROFON)	7
US Hot Latin Songs (Billboard)	9
US Tropical Songs (Billboard)	2
Venezuela (UPI)	5
