= List of number-one albums of 1991 (Spain) =

The List of number-one albums of 1991 in Spain is derived from the Top 100 España record chart published weekly by PROMUSICAE (Productores de Música de España), a non-profit organization composed by Spain and multinational record companies. This association tracks record sales (physical and digital) in Spain.

== Albums ==
Week	Chart Date	Album	Artist
1	January 7	The Very Best of Elton John	Elton John
2	January 14	The Very Best of Elton John	Elton John
3	January 21	The Very Best of Elton John	Elton John
4	January 28	The Very Best of Elton John	Elton John
5	February 4	Senderos de traición	Heroes del Silencio
6	February 11	Senderos de traición	Heroes del Silencio
7	February 18	MCMXC a.D.	Enigma
8	February 25	MCMXC a.D.	Enigma
9	March 4	Bachata Rosa	Juan Luis Guerra
10	March 11	Las Mejores Baladas	Varios Artistas
11	March 18	Bachata Rosa	Juan Luis Guerra
12	March 25	Bachata Rosa	Juan Luis Guerra
13	April 1	Bachata Rosa	Juan Luis Guerra
14	April 8	Bachata Rosa	Juan Luis Guerra
15	April 15	Bachata Rosa	Juan Luis Guerra
16	April 22	Bachata Rosa	Juan Luis Guerra
17	April 29	Bachata Rosa	Juan Luis Guerra
18	May 6	Grease B.S.O. de la Película	Varios Artistas
19	May 13	Grease B.S.O. de la Película	Varios Artistas
20	May 20	Grease B.S.O. de la Película	Varios Artistas
21	May 27	Grease B.S.O. de la Película	Varios Artistas
22	June 3	Bachata Rosa	Juan Luis Guerra
23	June 10	Aidalai	Mecano
24	June 17	Aidalai	Mecano
25	June 24	Aidalai	Mecano
26	July 1	Aidalai	Mecano
27	July 8	Aidalai	Mecano
28	July 15	Aidalai	Mecano
29	July 22	Aidalai	Mecano
30	July 29	Aidalai	Mecano
31	August 5	Aidalai	Mecano
32	August 12	Aidalai	Mecano
33	August 19	Aidalai	Mecano
34	August 26	Aidalai	Mecano
35	September 2	Aidalai	Mecano
36	September 9	On Every Street	Dire Straits
37	September 16	On Every Street	Dire Straits
38	September 23	On Every Street	Dire Straits
39	September 30	On Every Street	Dire Straits
40	October 7	On Every Street	Dire Straits
41	October 14	On Every Street	Dire Straits
42	October 21	On Every Street	Dire Straits
43	October 28	The Bee Gees Story	Bee Gees
44	November 4	Bolero Mix 8	Varios Artistas
45	November 11	Bolero Mix 8	Varios Artistas
46	November 18	Dangerous	Michael Jackson
47	November 25	Dangerous	Michael Jackson
48	December 2	Dangerous	Michael Jackson
49	December 9	Dangerous	Michael Jackson
50	December 16	Noches de Blanco Satén	Varios Artistas
51	December 23	Noches de Blanco Satén	Varios Artistas
52	December 30	Noches de Blanco Satén	Varios Artistas

== See also ==
- List of number-one singles of 1991 (Spain)
