= List of number-one hits of 1991 (Mexico) =

This is a list of the songs that reached number one in Mexico in 1991, according to the Notitas Musicales magazine with data provided by Radio Mil (which also provided charts for Billboard's "Hits of the World" between 1969 and 1981).

Notitas Musicales was a bi-weekly magazine that published two record charts:

- "Canciones que México canta" ("Songs that Mexico sings"), which listed the Top 10 most popular Spanish-language songs in Mexico, and
- "Hit Parade", which was a Top 10 of the most popular songs in Mexico that were in languages other than Spanish. For reasons unknown, the magazine stopped publishing the "Hit Parade" chart in 1988 and wouldn't feature it again until 1993.

== Chart history ==
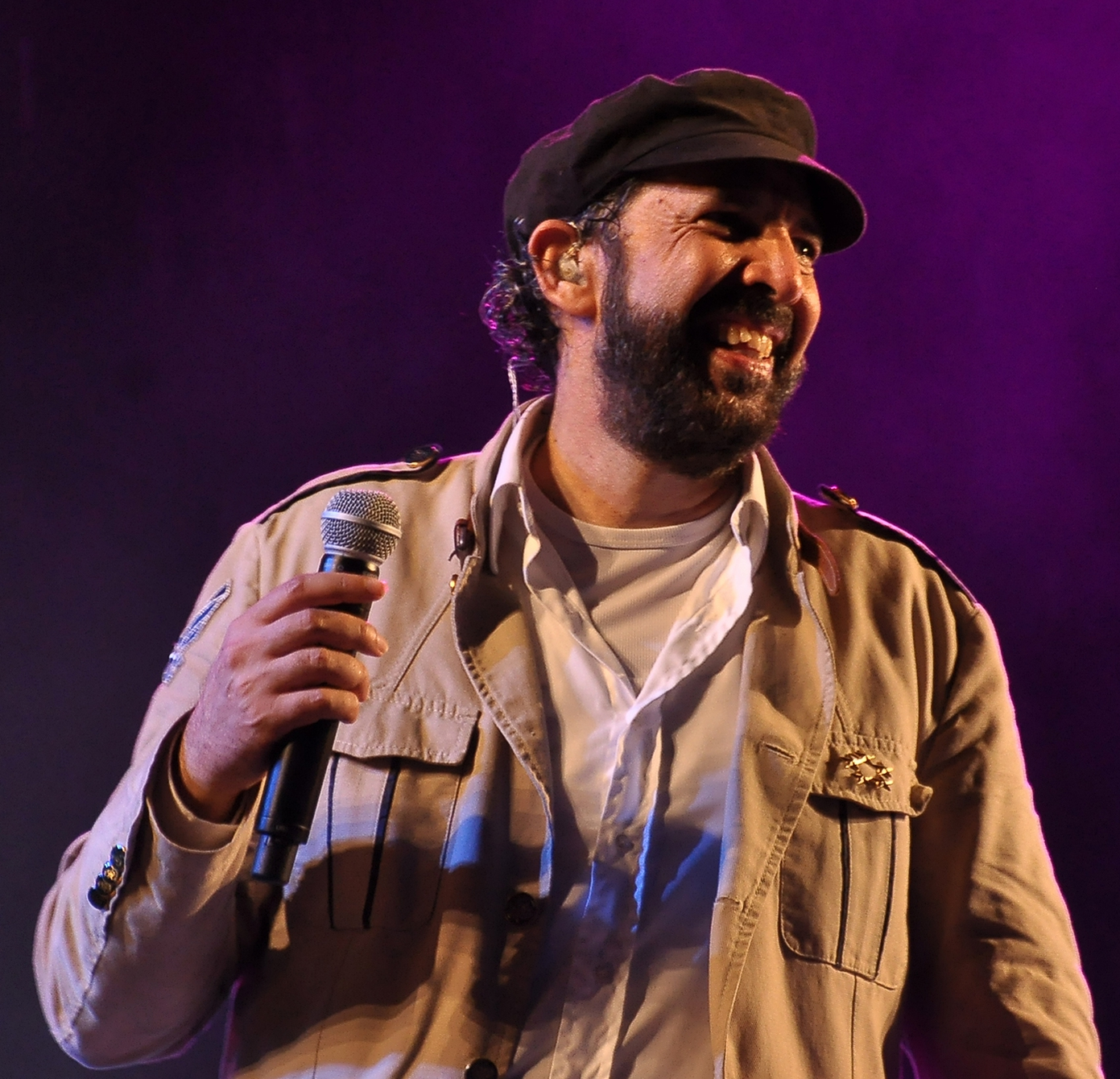
Dominican singer-songwriter Juan Luis Guerra (pictured) spent 4 months at the No. 1 position.

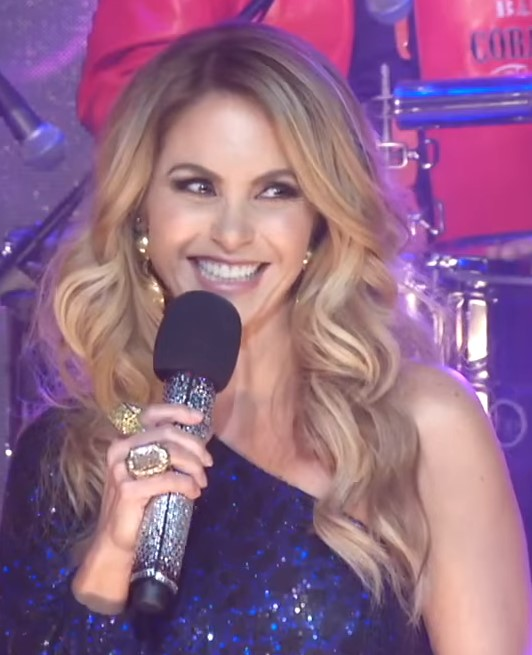
Mexican singer Lucero (pictured) had two number-one songs in 1991.

| Issue Date | "Songs that Mexico sings" (Spanish) | | |
| Issue Date | Song | Artist(s) | Ref. |
|---|---|---|---|
| 1 January | "Bella señora" | Emmanuel | |
| 15 January | "Bella señora" | Emmanuel | |
| 15 February | "¿Quién eres tú?" | Yuri | |
| 1 March | "Hasta que te conocí (popurrí)" | Juan Gabriel & Orquesta Sinfónica Nacional | |
| 15 March | "Burbujas de amor" | Juan Luis Guerra & 440 | |
| 15 April | "Burbujas de amor" | Juan Luis Guerra & 440 | |
| 1 May | "Burbujas de amor" | Juan Luis Guerra & 440 | |
| 15 May | "Burbujas de amor" | Juan Luis Guerra & 440 | |
| 1 June | "Burbujas de amor" | Juan Luis Guerra & 440 | |
| 15 June | "Burbujas de amor" | Juan Luis Guerra & 440 | |
| 1 July | "Bachata rosa" | Juan Luis Guerra & 440 | |
| 15 July | "Bachata rosa" | Juan Luis Guerra & 440 | |
| 1 August | "Electricidad" | Lucero | |
| 15 August | "Electricidad" | Lucero | |
| 1 September | "Electricidad" | Lucero | |
| 15 September | "Déjame llorar" | Ricardo Montaner | |
| 1 October | "Déjame llorar" | Ricardo Montaner | |
| 15 October | "Vuela, vuela" | Magneto | |
| 1 November | "Vuela, vuela" | Magneto | |
| 15 November | "Ya no" | Lucero | |
| 1 December | "Ya no" | Lucero | |
| 15 December | "Ya no" | Lucero | |

== See also ==
- 1991 in music

== Sources ==
- Print editions of the Notitas Musicales magazine.
