= Radio Güira =

EP by Juan Luis Guerra
- Released: November 3, 2023
- Recorded: 2023
- Genres: Merengue; bachata; Latin pop; blues
- Length: 21:24
- Label: Rimas
- Producers: Juan Luis Guerra; Jannia Rosado

Juan Luis Guerra chronology
Entre Mar y Palmeras (2021)	Radio Güira (2023)	Capitan Avispa (Original Motion Picture Soundtrack) (2024)

Singles from Radio Güira
- 1. "Mambo 23" Released: September 22, 2023; 2. "La Noviecita" Released: December 6, 2023; 3. "Dj Bachata" Released: February 1, 2024

Radio Güira is the second extended play by the Dominican singer Juan Luis Guerra, released on November 3, 2023 by Rimas Entertainment. Written and produced by Guerra and Janina Rosado, the six track EP is inspired by a radio station broadcast created by Guerra titled 4:40 FM. Exploring a number of different sounds and music genres, the EP encompasses blues, jazz, rock, big band, bachata, mambo, and merengue and includes the participation of pianist Michel Camilo.

Thematically, Guerra described the EP concept as something innovative, imagining a station playing 4.40 music in different parts of the world and including interludes of skits of phone-in commercials and announcements. Each of the six songs are presented with voiceover capsules. Recorded and mixed by Allan Leschhorn and mastered by Adam Ayan, it is his second EP following the acoustic Privé (2020).

Radio Guira was met with universal acclaim by critics and fans alike. At the 25th Annual Latin Grammy Awards, it won Album of the Year and Best Merengue/Bachata Album, with "Mambo 23" winning Record of the Year and Best Tropical Song. Also, it was supported by its lead single, "Mambo 23", on September 29, 2023, which topped the US Tropical Airplay and La Noviecita that reached the top 10 on the same chart. The songs was included on the set list on the last leg of the Entre Mar y Palmeras Tour (2022–24). The EP was release in Vinyl on Octubre 24, 2025.

== Background ==
On December 25, 2020, Guerra released his first extended play, Privé. The EP received critical acclaim earning Best Traditional Pop Vocal Album at the 22nd Annual Latin Grammy Awards. In 2021, Guerra released his second live album Entre Mar y Palmeras and the following year embarked on a world tour. Due to high demand, new shows were added in 2023 and 2024.

On September 15, 2023, Guerra teased the release of new music through social media. On September 20, 2023, he confirmed the title and release date. On September 22, 2023, he released "Mambo 23" as the lead single from Radio Güira along with its music video. Also, the release date was revealed as November 2023. The single was released before starting the third leg of the tour in the United States. "Mambo 23" was the first time that Guerra ventured into mambo; "Merengue de Calle" included elements of trap music and Dominican dembow. On October 30, 2023, Guerra confirmed the release date through social media, and the EP was to be available pre-save on streaming platforms. The extended play was released on the same day of Guerra's last concert of his third American leg of his tour at Maverik Center in Salt Lake City.

== Concept and themes ==
Radio Guira was released as a "gift to the fans". The concept is based on a fictional radio station that Guerra titled "4:40 FM". According to Rolling Stone, it was partially influenced by a radio show called Radio Viva that he had years ago, with different languages announcing the time and different recipes, as well as his longtime love of the güira, a percussion instrument common in folk and popular music from the Dominican Republic.

According to Guerra, "When listeners tune in to each of the six songs, they find a brief speech that transports the listener to a unique experience in which the 70s and 2023 manage to coexist between the classic and the current". He stated that the production "has a different concept" and "our purpose was to do something innovative. We imagine a station playing 4.40 music in different parts of the world. We include calls, recipes and the genres of mambo, bachata and merengue."

Each of the six songs is presented with voiceover capsules with the purpose of giving the listener a unique experience. According to Billboard Argentina, the EP serves as a meeting point between generations, languages and musical genres that seeks to unite us through music and message.

== Musical style, writing and composition ==
All tracks were written and composed by Juan Luis Guerra. According to the artist, Radio Guira has a "very broad target". The first track "Mambo 23" marked the first time Guerra ventured into merengue-mambo (merengue de calle) with arrangements of saxophones, trumpets, trombones and classical instruments. It has lyrics that reflect on the current state of society and contains a message of redemption and Christianity. According to Guerra, he liked the result and chose the track as the lead single of the EP with the idea to connect different generations with its music, whether from the lyrics or from the rhythms.

The second track "DJ Bachata" has a beginning that evokes elements of the 1970s, with a guitar melody and a flanger, which fits with the sound of the bongos and the güiro. The lyrics are about a young man who learns different steps to dance with a girl, but for his comfort, at the time of dancing the DJ plays bachata. The third track "La Noviecita" is a folk merengue with influences of jazz and rock. It contains a solo by Sandy Gabriel on alto sax.

The fourth track "Cositas de Amor" is described by the artist as "popton", an experimental mix of pop and reggaeton that contains a recorded sound of a coupe glass. It begins with the ingredients of a recipe for beans from Guerra's personal chef. The lyrics of the track are dedicated to Nora, Juan Luis's wife. According to the artist, "It's very special for me because my wife always asks me to serenade her, but it turns out that the serenades are with songs that are not mine, that she likes, by artists like Neil Young, Tom Petty or other composers and I composed this song thinking of satisfying her by serenading her. That's what this song is about." Guerra stated "Cositas de Amor" and "Mambo 23" are for a "very young audience".

The fifth track "Como Me Enamora" is described by Los Angeles Times as "a merengue very much in the style of 4.40 with a very modern brass riff". It features vocals of Guerra's daughter Paulina. According to Guerra, "Como Me Enamora" and "DJ Bachata" are dedicated to long-time fans. The final track "Te Invito a un Blues" is a collaboration with Dominican pianist Michel Camilo. It is a merengue with blues described by the artist as "pambiche blues" and contains a big band arrangement inspired by Duke Ellington, Count Basie, and Thad Jones. The track begins with a presentation in Japanese, then features wind instruments inspired by the sounds of the 1970s. According to the artist, the track is more for musicians and is dedicated to lovers of jazz and big band and is a gift for himself.

== Critical reception ==
Radio Güira received positive reviews from music critics, with particular attention given to its concept and musical scope. Writing for Rolling Stone en Español, Jean Alberto Rodríguez noted that the EP expands beyond Juan Luis Guerra's signature bachata and merengue by incorporating styles such as mambo and big band blended with pambiche. The publication presented the project as an example of Guerra’s continued musical experimentation while maintaining the rhythmic identity associated with his work.

The EP also received year-end recognition from Billboard. In December 2023, the magazine included Radio Güira in its staff-selected list of The 25 Best Latin Albums of 2023, placing it among the Latin releases it considered most notable that year. In its blurb for the project, Billboard referenced the EP’s radio-inspired framing, including Guerra’s spoken introduction, and highlighted the release as part of a year defined by stylistic range and strong Latin album projects across different genres. Its inclusion on the list positioned Radio Güira among the most critically recognized Latin releases of 2023.

=== Accolades ===
Radio Güira received significant recognition from the Latin music industry following its release. At the 25th Annual Latin Grammy Awards in November 2024, the EP won Album of the Year, giving Juan Luis Guerra another victory in one of the ceremony’s top categories. The project also won Best Merengue/Bachata Album, while its single “Mambo 23” received the awards for Record of the Year and Best Tropical Song. Guerra was widely reported as one of the night’s top winners, with Radio Güira serving as the centerpiece of that success.

Awards and nominations for Radio Güira
Year	Award	Category	Recipient	Result	Ref.
2024	Premios Soberano 2024	Artista y/o agrupación destacada en el extranjero	Juan Luis Guerra	Won	
2024	Premios Soberano 2024	Merengue del Año	"Mambo 23"	Nominated	
2024	Premios Soberano 2024	Videoclip del Año	"Mambo 23"	Won	
2024	25th Annual Latin Grammy Awards	Album of the Year	Radio Güira	Won	
2024	25th Annual Latin Grammy Awards	Best Merengue/Bachata Album	Radio Güira	Won	
2024	25th Annual Latin Grammy Awards	Record of the Year	"Mambo 23"	Won	
2024	25th Annual Latin Grammy Awards	Best Tropical Song	"Mambo 23"	Won	
2025	Lo Nuestro Awards	Best Christian Song	"Mambo 23"	Nominated	
2025	Lo Nuestro Awards	Song of the Year - Tropical	"Mambo 23"	Nominated	
2025	Lo Nuestro Awards	Album of the Year - Tropical	Radio Guira	Nominated	
2025	Lo Nuestro Awards	Artist of the Year - Tropical	Juan Luis Guerra	Nominated	
2025	Premios Soberano 2025	Artista y/o agrupación destacada en el extranjero	Juan Luis Guerra	Won	

== Track listing ==
No.	Title	Length
1.	"Mambo 23"	3:39
2.	"DJ Bachata"	3:29
3.	"La Noviecita"	3:41
4.	"Cositas de Amor"	4:12
5.	"Cómo Me Enamora"	3:11
6.	"Te Invito a un Blues"	3:09
Total length:		21:24
