= Frío Frío =

"Frio Frio"
- Cover of the 12", Maxi-Single release in Spain

Single by Juan Luis Guerra

from the album Areito
- Language: Spanish
- B-side: "La Bilirrubina"
- Released: August 1991
- Recorded: 1991
- Genre: Bachata
- Length: 4:08
- Label: Karem Records

Juan Luis Guerra singles chronology
"Bachata Rosa" (1991)	"Frio Frio" (1991)	"Señales de Humo" (1992)

Frio Frio or Frio, Frio (English: Cold, Cold) is the lead single of the sixth studio album Areito by Dominican superstar Juan Luis Guerra. The song is considered to be a bachata by many, however it is actually a bolero. It was written based on a poem by Federico García Lorca and was released in August 1991. The track received positive reviews from critics and was nominated for Tropical Salsa Song of the Year at the 4th Lo Nuestro Awards. Frio Frio was a success peaking at number 4 on Billboard Hot Latin Tracks and at the Top 5 airplay in Panama and Uruguay.

The track was included on Guerra's greatest hits album Grandes Éxitos Juan Luis Guerra y 440 and Coleccion Romantica (2001). In 2013, a live version of the song with Romeo Santos was released as lead single of Guerra's live album A Son de Guerra Tour (2013).

== Tracklist ==
- Spain 12", Maxi-Single (1993)
  1. Frio Frio – 4:08
  2. Frio Frio (Kareoke Version) – 4:08
  3. La Bilirrubina
- Europe CD, Maxi-Single (1993)
  1. Frio Frio – 4:08
  2. Frio Frio (Instrumental) – 4:08
  3. La Bilirrubina – 4:01

== Charts ==
=== Studio version ===
Chart (1991–93)	Peak position
Chile (EFE)	10
El Salvador (EFE)	8
Panama (UPI)	5
Uruguay (UPI)	5
US Hot Latin Songs (Billboard)	4

=== Live version with Romeo Santos ===
Chart (2013)	Peak position
US Hot Latin Songs (Billboard)	16
US Latin Airplay (Billboard)	15
US Latin Pop Airplay (Billboard)	15
US Tropical Airplay (Billboard)	17
