= De Poezenkrant =

Dutch magazine

De Poezenkrant was an irregularly published Dutch magazine with short reports about and many illustrations about cats that came out between 1974 and 2023. The 'Letters' section was infamous, not least because of the answers and threats from the editors. The magazine was written, designed, and published by graphic designer Piet Schreuders. Writer Willem Frederik Hermans and photographer Ed van der Elsken also often contributed. The design was experimental and eclectic in format, layout and style; the later issues increasingly appeared as pastiches of well-known publications, ranging from National Geographic magazine to the gossip magazine Privé. Because it was published irregularly, subscriptions were taken out per issue, rather than per quarter until 2019. After that, the magazine could only be purchased individually at widely varying prices per edition. The magazine also featured submissions from readers, including the poet Jean Pierre Rawie.

In reality, De Poezenkrant was not a magazine focused on cats at all, but it was a playful vehicle for graphic design and typography by Piet Schreuders, it was only later that the paper evolved into what newspaper Het Parool described a "cultural-historical phenomenon"

== History ==
De Poezenkrant was first published on the 7th of February 1974 and initially came out about once a month, although two newspapers appeared on the 10th of July 1974. From the fifteenth issue onwards, the newspapers (sometimes in the form of small booklets) were published more irregularly. Later the intervals between editions increased to several years. The combined number 50-51 was published in October 2004, number 52 in 2007 and number 53 in spring 2009. Number 57 from 2013 was the booklet Poes in oppression and resistance 1940-1945 by Paul Arnoldussen. Number 67 from 2021 was the aforementioned pastiche on the magazine Privé. In issue 70, dated 7 February 2024, a footnote reads "Last issue".

In 2005, the Amsterdam Public Library devoted an exposition to De Poezenkrant.
