= Mientras Más Lo Pienso...Tú =

Mientras Más lo Pienso... Tú

Studio album by Juan Luis Guerra
- Released: 1987
- Recorded: October–November 1986
- Studio: Emca, Santo Domingo, Dominican Republic
- Genre: Merengue; Latin
- Length: 33:20
- Label: Karen Records; Universal Music Latino
- Producer: Juan Luis Guerra

Juan Luis Guerra chronology
| Mudanza y Acarreo (1985) | Mientras Más lo Pienso... Tú (1987) | Ojalá Que Llueva Café (1989) |

Singles from Mientras Más lo Piensa... Tú
- 1. "Guavaberry" Released: 1987; 2. "Tú" Released: 1987; 3. "Me enamoro de Ella" Released: 1987

Mientras Más lo Pienso... Tú (The More I Think About It... You) is the third studio album by Juan Luis Guerra. It contains the hits "Guavaberry" and "Me enamoro de Ella" which was later included in the greatest hits album Grandes Éxitos Juan Luis Guerra y 440 (1995) and "Tu" was re-recorded and included on Coleccion Romantica (2001).

Following the national success from Mudanza y Acarreo (1985), Guerra continued innovating, mixing and experimenting tropical elements with merengue. In result, Mientras Más lo Pienso... Tú was more successful than his previous two albums and served as a platform for national fame in the Dominican Republic and to gain some international attention from Latin American countries such as Venezuela and Puerto Rico.

== Track listing ==
| No. | Title | Length |
|---|---|---|
| 1. | "Guavaberry" | 4:16 |
| 2. | "Tú" | 3:53 |
| 3. | "Amor de Conuco" | 3:50 |
| 4. | "No Me Acostumbro" | 4:38 |
| 5. | "Me Enamoro de Ella" | 4:16 |
| 6. | "¡Ay! Mujer" | 4:06 |
| 7. | "Amigos" | 4:22 |
| 8. | "Rock-a-Fiesta" | 3:45 |
| Total length: | | 33:20 |
