= Entre Mar y Palmeras Tour =

2022–24 concert tour by Juan Luis Guerra

- Tour by Juan Luis Guerra
- Promotion of Guerra's residency at Punta Cana
- Associated album: Entre Mar y Palmeras; Privé EP
- Start date: February 12, 2022
- End date: March 1, 2025
- Legs: 8
- No. of shows: 61

Juan Luis Guerra concert chronology
- Literal Tour Grandes Éxitos (2019); Entre Mar y Palmeras (2022–24)

Entre Mar y Palmera Tour is the title of the world tour of Dominican superstar Juan Luis Guerra and 4:40 to promote his live album of the same title, his EP Prive and to celebrate the 30th Anniversary of his blockbuster album Bachata Rosa. The tour kicked off February 12, 2022, in Punta Cana, Dominican Republic and is expected to end on July 13, 2024 in A Coruña, Spain.

== Background ==
Guerra's previous tour, Literal Tour Grandes Éxitos, was expected to end on December 12, 2020, with a massive concert at the Estadio Olimipico in Santo Domingo, Dominican Republic. However, it was cancelled due the COVID-19 pandemic. On December 25, 2020, Guerra released a special live stream as a Christmas gift for his fans, and he released Prive EP. On June 3, 2021, he broadcast a special concert for HBO Latino and later released his second album Entre Mar y Palmeras. Shortly after, he announced a world tour with the same name.

== Overview ==
In December 2021, Guerra announced a four-concert residency at the Hard Rock Café & Casino Punta Cana. The tour was set to kick off February 5, 2022; however, it was postponed due heavy rain and bad weather. The final concert of the residency on April 2, 2022, had an attendance of 5,000 fans and received positive reviews by local media. The concert at Miami FX Arena was supposed to be played on April 30, 2022; however, it was postponed to May 13, 2022, due Guerra testing positive to COVID-19. Despite this, it received positive reviews by the media and critics. The concert at the Coliseo de Puerto Rico in San Juan was reported by the media to be sold out and also received critical acclaim by critics. In Madrid, the concert was reported sold out with over 15,000 tickets sold. The concert in Lima, Peru was reported sold out within minutes on been announced. Also, the tickets for the concert in Santiago de Chile were quickly sold out. In Santo Domingo, the tour broke records as the fastest selling concert at the venue, Estadio Olimpico Felix Sanchez. At the time when the tickets were available online over 15,000 fans were signed up. The 50,000 tickets were sold in just three hours. The concerts in Spain in 2022 had a total attendance of 70,000.

== Tour dates ==
Date	City	Country	Venue
Leg 1 – Latin America and United States
February 12, 2022	Punta Cana	Dominican Republic	Hard Rock Cafe & Casino Punta Cana
February 19, 2022	Punta Cana	Dominican Republic	Hard Rock Cafe & Casino Punta Cana
February 26, 2022	Punta Cana	Dominican Republic	Hard Rock Cafe & Casino Punta Cana
March 5, 2022	Houston	United States	Smart Financial Centre
March 6, 2022	Dallas	United States	American Airlines Center
March 25, 2022	Newark	United States	Prudential Center
March 27, 2022	Washington, D.C.	United States	EagleBank Arena
April 2, 2022 (Note: The concert was original to take place on February 5, 2022. However, it was postpone due heavy rain.)	Punta Cana	Dominican Republic	Hard Rock Cafe & Casino Punta Cana
April 30, 2022	San Juan	Puerto Rico	Coliseo de Puerto Rico
May 13, 2022 (Note: It was original to take place on April 30th of 2022. However, it was postponed due to the artist having tested positive for Covid-19.)	Miami	United States	FTX Arena
June 2, 2022	Rosemont	United States	Allstate Arena
June 4, 2022	Orlando	United States	Amway Center
Europe
July 1, 2022	Chiclana de la Frontera	Spain	Sancti Petri (Note: This performance was part of the Concert Music Festival)
July 3, 2022 (Note: Cuitat Festival by Caixabank)	Valencia	Spain	Estadi Ciutat
July 5, 2022 (Note: This Concert is part Murcia on Festival 2022)	Murcia	Spain	FICA Murcia
July 7, 2022	Bilbao	Spain	Bilbao Exhibition Centre
July 9, 2022 (Note: This concert was part of Barcelona Cuilla Festival 2022)	Barcelona	Spain	Parc del Fòrum
July 10, 2022	Madrid	Spain	Winzink Center
Latin America
August 12, 2022 (Note: This concert was part of Feria de las Flores 2022 co-headlined with Don Omar)	Medellin	Colombia	Estadio Atanasio Girardot
November 7, 2022	Santiago	Chile	Movistar Arena
November 9, 2022	Santiago	Chile	Movistar Arena
November 22, 2022	Lima	Peru	Arena Perú
November 25, 2022	Bogota	Colombia	Movistar Arena
November 27, 2022	Bogota	Colombia	Movistar Arena
November 30, 2022 (Note: The concert in Santiago on November 7, 2022, was originally announced to take place on November 30, 2022, but it was rescheduled due to medical reasons.)	Santiago	Chile	Movistar Arena
February 18, 2023 (Note: Te concert of February 18, 2023 was part of Metro Concierto 2023 Festival)	Barranquilla	Colombia	Estadio Romelio Martinez
North America
April 22, 2023	Sunrise	United States	Fla Live Arena
April 23, 2023	Tampa	United States	Amelie Arena
April 28, 2023	New York	United States	Madison Square Garden
April 30, 2023	San Juan	Puerto Rico	Coliseo de Puerto Rico
Latin America
May 4, 2023	Guatemala City	Guatemala	Explanada Cayala
May 6, 2023	San Salvador	El Salvador	Estadio Cuscatlan
May 25, 2023	Lima	Peru	Estadio San Marcos
June 8, 2023	Panama City	Panama	Estadio Rommel Fernández
June 10, 2023	San José	Costa Rica	Estadio Nacional
Europe
July 1, 2023 (Note: The concert July 1, 2023 is part of Festival Rio Babel 2023)	Madrid	Spain	Caja Magica
July 4, 2023	Barcelona	Spain	Palau Sant Jordi
July 6, 2023	Malaga	Spain	Marenostrum Fuengirola
July 8, 2023 (Note: The concert of July 8, 2014 was part of Isla Bonita Love Festival La Palma 2023)	Santa Cruz de la Palma	Spain	Puerto de Tazacote
North America III
September 21, 2023	Hollywood	United States	Hard Rock Live
September 23, 2023	Ft. Myers	United States	Hertz Arena
October 13, 2023	Reading	United States	Santander Arena
October 15, 2023	Atlanta	United States	Gas South Arena
November 1, 2023	Inglewood	United States	The Forum
November 3, 2023	Salt Lake City	United States	Maverik Center
Latin America
November 12, 2023	San Juan	Puerto Rico	Coliseo de Puerto Rico
February 10, 2024	Santo Domingo	Dominican Republic	Estadio Olimpico Felix Sanchez
April 24, 2024 (Note: The Concert of April 20, 2024 was part of the first edition of Capitalia Music Festival)	Santo Domingo	Dominican Republic	Estadio Olimpico Felix Sanchez
May 4, 2024 (Note: The concert of May 4, 2024 was part of Festival de la Leyenda Vallenata 2024)	Valledupar	Colombia	Parque de la Leyenda Vallenata
Europe
June 28, 2024	Amsterdam	Netherlands	NI Park
June 30, 2024	Zurich	Switzerland	Hallestadion
July 3, 2024	Lisboa	Portugal	Jardins Do Marques
July 5, 2024	Milan	Italy	Acquatica Milano
July 7, 2024	Malaga	Spain	Malaga Forum
July 9, 2024	Madrid	Spain	Wizink Center
July 11, 2024	Valencia	Spain	Estadio Ciutat De Valencia
July 13, 2024	A Coruña	Spain	Coliseum De A Coruña
Latin America & Caribbean
August 30, 2024 (Note: The concert of August 30, 2024 was part of Curacao North Sea Jazz 2024)	Willemstad	Curacao	Piscadera Bay
September 14, 2024 (Note: The concert of September of 14, 2024 was part of Cordillera Music Festival 2024)	Bogota	Colombia	Parque Simon Bolivar
January 12, 2025 (Note: The concert of January 12, 2025 was part of Feria de Manizales 2025)	Manizales	Colombia	Estadio Palogrande
March 1, 2025 (Note: The concert of March 1, 2025 was part of Metroconcierto 2025)	Barranquilla	Colombia	Estadio Romelio Martinez

=== Cancelled shows ===
List of cancelled concerts, showing date, city, country, venue, and reason for cancellation
Date	City	Country	Venue	Reason
November 23, 2022	Lima	Peru	Arena Peru	Banned by authorities due to ticket overselling issues
November 24, 2022	Guayaquil	Ecuador	Estadio Alberto Spencer	Social issues and instability in the country
November 26, 2022	Quito	Ecuador	Estadio Olímpico Atahualpa	Social issues and instability in the country

=== Notes ===
1. The concert was original to take place on February 5, 2022. However, it was postpone due heavy rain.
2. It was original to take place on April 30th of 2022. However, it was postponed due to the artist having tested positive for Covid-19.
3. This performance was part of the Concert Music Festival
4. Cuitat Festival by Caixabank
5. This Concert is part Murcia on Festival 2022
6. This concert was part of Barcelona Cuilla Festival 2022
7. This concert was part of Feria de las Flores 2022 co-headlined with Don Omar
8. The concert in Santiago on November 7, 2022, was originally announced to take place on November 30, 2022, but it was rescheduled due to medical reasons.
9. Te concert of February 18, 2023 was part of Metro Concierto 2023 Festival
10. The concert July 1, 2023 is part of Festival Rio Babel 2023
11. The concert of July 8, 2014 was part of Isla Bonita Love Festival La Palma 2023
12. The Concert of April 20, 2024 was part of the first edition of Capitalia Music Festival
13. The concert of May 4, 2024 was part of Festival de la Leyenda Vallenata 2024
14. The concert of August 30, 2024 was part of Curacao North Sea Jazz 2024
15. The concert of September of 14, 2024 was part of Cordillera Music Festival 2024
16. The concert of January 12, 2025 was part of Feria de Manizales 2025
17. The concert of March 1, 2025 was part of Metroconcierto 2025
