= A Pedir Su Mano =

Single by Juan Luis Guerra

from the album Bachata Rosa
- B-side: "Bachata Rosa"
- Released: 1990
- Recorded: 1990
- Genre: Merengue'; Afropop
- Length: 4:51
- Label: Karem Records
- Songwriter: Lea Lignanzi

Juan Luis Guerra singles chronology
"Burbujas de Amor" (1990)	"A Pedir Su Mano" (1991)	"Estrellitas y Duendes" (1991)

A Pedir Su Mano (English: Ask her hand) is a song by Dominican Republic singer-songwriter Juan Luis Guerra released as the fourth single for his album Bachata Rosa (1990). It was released in 1990 by Karem Records and in 1992 on Europe by Ariola. The track is a merengue version of the song "Dede Priscilla," by Lea Lignanzi from the Central African Republic. The track combined music elements of Afropop and zouk with merengue. The music video shows people in traditional African dress dancing in sugarcane fields with a cartoon of a red train traversing the landscape.

The song received positive reviews by the critics and won Video of the Year at the 1991 Lo Nuestro Awards and was nominated for International Viewer's Choice: MTV Internacional. It is widely considered one of Guerra's most popular and signature songs and was included on Guerra's greatest hits album Grandes Éxitos Juan Luis Guerra y 440 and live versions of the track were included on the albums A Son De Guerra Tour (2013) and Entre Mar y Palmeras (2021). In 2020, the track was re-recorded in an acoustic version and included on his Privé EP.

== Tracklist ==
1. A Pedir su Mano – 4:51
2. Bachata Rosa – 4:17
3. Razones – 3:57

== Charts ==
Chart (1990–91)	Peak position
Panama (UPI)	9
Peru (UPI)	5
US Hot Latin Songs (Billboard)	13
Venezuela (UPI)	3
