= Mudanza y Acarreo =

Mudanza Y Acarreo

Studio album by Juan Luis Guerra y 440
- Released: 1985
- Recorded: 1984
- Genre: Merengue
- Length: 31:07
- Label: Karen Records

Juan Luis Guerra y 440 chronology
Soplando (1984)	Mudanza Y Acarreo (1985)	Mientras Más Lo Pienso...Tú (1987)

Singles from Mundaza Y Acarreo
- 1. "Si Tu Te Vas" Released: 1985; 2. "Elena" Released: 1985; 3. "Por Eso Ahora" Released: 1985; 4. "Ella Dice" Released: 1985; 5. "Yo Vivo Enamorado" Released: 1985

Mudanza y Acarreo (transl. House Moving and Haulage) is the second album by songwriter and musician Juan Luis Guerra. The album is widely known for making Guerra and 440 famous, and launching to national fame the group within their native Dominican Republic. It was the first album recorded with Maridalia Hernández as a member of the band. With this record, the group got radio airplay for the first time with songs like "Elena" and "Por eso Ahora" in the Dominican Republic. "Si tu te vas" is considered their first hit and was included in the Greatest Hits compilation Grandes Éxitos Juan Luis Guerra y 440 (1995) as bonus track.

== Background ==
The debut album Soplando (1984) received critical acclaim but not much attention, and was largely ignored by the general public and radio listeners. Lead singer Juan Luis Guerra and power-vocalist Maridalia Hernandez redefined 440's sound to more traditional danceable merengue boundaries and made a more commercial turn to the band's musical career. For many, Mundaza y Acarreo was the beginning of his commercial career. According to Guerra himself, "Si tu te vas" was his first merengue song recorded ever. Also, the album contained the song "Dame" which is a Spanish version of "Don't Stop 'Til You Get Enough" by Michael Jackson.

== Critical reception ==
The album received positive reviews from critics. Billboard magazine's Latin section stated that "The Dominican smart set's fave, La 440, with its blend of doo-wop harmony and sharp-edged merengue dance beat, is smart indeed. Impeccable elegance and irresistible funk."

== Commercial performance ==
In the United States, the album debuted and peaked at number 17 on the Billboard Tropical Albums for the week of February 22, 1986, becoming Guerra's first entry on the chart. It remained on the chart for seven consecutive weeks.

The album was supported by the release of the singles "Si Tú Te Vas", "Elena", "Por Eso Ahora", "Ella Dice" and "Yo Vivo Enamorado". The lead single, "Si tu te vas", was Guerra's first radio hit in the Dominican Republic.

== Track listing ==
Original
No.	Title	Length
1.	"Por Eso Ahora"	3:22
2.	"Ella Dice"	3:31
3.	"Yo Vivo Enamorado"	4:59
4.	"Réquiem Sobre El Jaragua (Le Dién Dinamita)"	3:15
5.	"Si Tu Te Vas"	3:48
6.	"Elena"	4:00
7.	"Santiago En Coche"	4:00
8.	"Dame"	4:12
Total length:		31:07

Re-issue
No.	Title	Length
8.	"Amigos"	4:38
Total length:		31:37

== Charts ==
Chart (1986)	Peak position
US Tropical Albums (Billboard)	17
