= Soplando =

Studio album by Juan Luis Guerra & 440
- Released: 1984
- Recorded: 1983
- Genre: Merengue; Latin; jazz
- Length: 32:40
- Label: Karen Records; EMA; WEA
- Producer: Juan Luis Guerra

Juan Luis Guerra & 440 chronology
Soplando (1984)	Mudanza y Acarreo (1985)

Professional ratings
Review scores
Source	Rating
Allmusic	2/5 stars

Soplando.(transl. Blowing) is the debut album by Dominican songwriter and musician Juan Luis Guerra and his group 440. It was released in 1984 by EMA Records. This album was not composed by Juan Luis Guerra, as he served only as a vocalist. In 1990 and 1991, it was re-released as El Original 4.40 by WEA and gain a little more attention as Guerra was already established internationally.

== Track listing ==
No.	Title	Length
1.	"Feliciana"	4:40
2.	"Soplando"	3:15
3.	"Carnaval"	2:16
4.	"Juana Mecho"	6:03
5.	"Jardinera"	2:54
6.	"Sambomba"	4:47
7.	"Loreta"	6:30
8.	"La Calle Gris"	2:16
Total length:		32:40
