= Coleccion Cristiana =

Studio album / Compilation album by Juan Luis Guerra
- Released: February 28, 2012
- Recorded: 2011–2012
- Genres: Merengue, bachata, ballad
- Length: 37:36
- Label: EMI

Juan Luis Guerra chronology
A Son de Guerra (2010)	Coleccion Cristiana (2012)	A Son de Guerra Tour (2013)

Singles from Coleccion Cristiana
- 1. "En el Cielo No Hay Hospital" Released: December 16, 2011

Colección Cristiana is the 12th album by Dominican songwriter and musician Juan Luis Guerra, released on February 28, 2012. It is also his first Christian album since 2004's Para Ti.

Unlike the first Christian album, Para Ti in 2004, this album is distinguished for being very varied in terms of the musical genres it offers, since it contains merengue, bachata, son, pop, ballad and merengue tipico o perico ripiao. Also, the disc is characterized to include four subjects that were sent in productions previously: "Las Avispas", "Para Ti" and "Soldado", which belong to the album Para Ti and "Son al Rey" of the previous album A Son De Guerra .

== Reception ==
Mariano Prunes of Allmusic gave the album a positive review and wrote "this collection is a standard Juan Luis Guerra and 440 release, a celebration of life set to the best and most joyful merengue and bachata music the world has to offer".

The album debuted at number 6 on the Billboard Top Latin Albums and number 2 on the Billboard Tropical Albums. The lead single "En el Cielo No Hay Hospital" had a moderate success in the charts as well. The album also peaked at number 41 on the Spanish Albums Chart.

Professional ratings
Review scores
Source	Rating
AllMusic	3.5/5 stars

== Track listing ==
All tracks are written by Juan Luis Guerra.

No.	Title	Length
1.	"El Quita Pena"	3:28
2.	"Viene Bajando"	2:32
3.	"Las Avispas"	3:16
4.	"Son Al Rey"	3:27
5.	"En el Cielo No Hay Hospital"	3:09
6.	"Para Ti"	3:43
7.	"Caballo Blanco"	2:49
8.	"Mi Jesus"	3:51
9.	"Soldado"	3:55
10.	"Como Trompeta en Si Bemol"	3:16
11.	"Nada Me Separara"	4:10
Total length:		37:36

== Charts ==
=== Weekly charts ===
Chart (2012)	Peak position
Colombian Albums (Prodiscos)	5
Ecuadorian Albums (Musicalismo)	16
US Top Latin Albums (Billboard)	6
US Tropical Albums (Billboard)	2
Spanish Albums (Promusicae)	41
Venezuelan Albums (Recordland)	6

=== Year-end charts ===
Chart (2012)	Position
Argetinan Albums (CAPIF)	73
US Top Latin Albums (Billboard)	69
US Tropical Albums (Billboard)	6
