= Barceló (rum) =

Dominican rum company

Ron Barceló S.R.L.
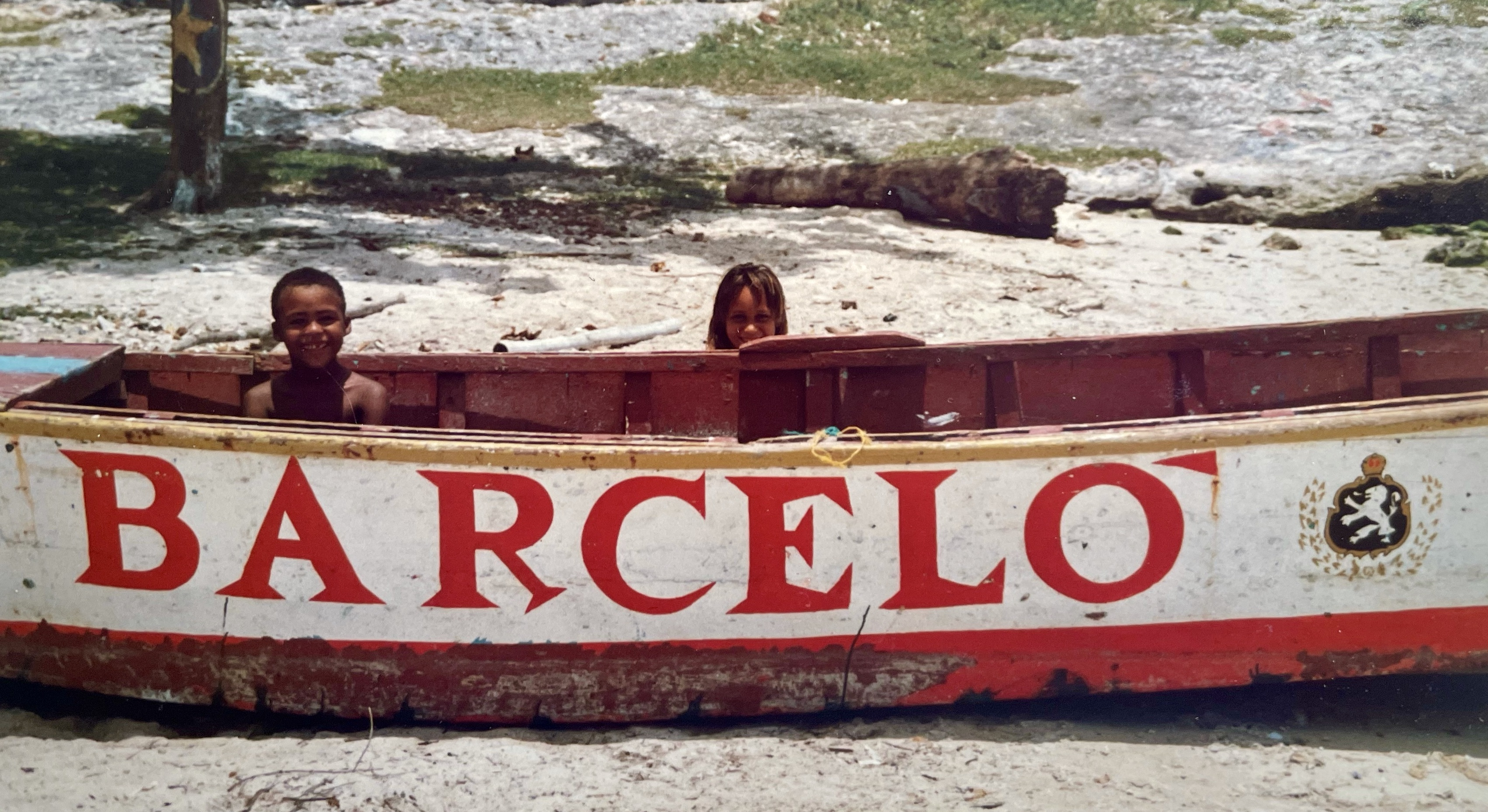
- Barcelò logo
- Type: Private company
- Industry: Distilled beverages
- Founded: 1930
- Headquarters: Santo Domingo, Dominican Republic
- Products: Rum
- Parent: Ron Barceló S.R.L.
- Website: www.ronbarcelo.com

Barceló is the name and brand of a variety of rums from the Dominican Republic produced by Ron Barceló S.R.L. Production happens on the Barceló family estate in San Pedro de Macorís. As of 2023, it is the Dominican Republic's most exported rum brand. Barceló, along with Brugal and Bermúdez, are collectively known as the three B's. It is a non-distilling producer, as they source their rum from Alcoholes Finos Dominicanos (AFD) since 2010, and prior to that, they purchased their rums from other third parties.

== History ==
In 1929, brothers Julián and Andrés Barceló immigrated from Mallorca, Spain to Santo Domingo, Dominican Republic In 1930, they founded Barceló & Co. and began producing rum and selling it domestically. The following year, a hurricane hit the Dominican Republic and destroyed the distillery, and Andrés Barceló left the island to live in Puerto Rico, though Julián Barceló rebuilt the distillery.

In 1946, operations moved to San Pedro de Macoris, on the eastern bank of the Ozama River, where the estate continues to operate. The Barceló brand was created in 1950 with the releases of Ron Barceló Blanco and Dorado.

In 1974, Julián Barceló stepped down and gave control of the company to his nephew, Miguel Barceló.

In 1980, Barceló released its flagship rum, Ron Barceló Imperial.

In 1992, Barceló started selling internationally in Central America, and in 1994, Barceló entered Europe with its introduction in Spain, which is now their biggest market. In 2001, Barceló sold distribution rights to Spanish company Grupo Varma, and the following year, a new parent company called Añejos Barceló was formed, later renamed to Ron Barceló S.R.L.

In 2010, Ron Barceló S.R.L. joined Yazoo Investment S.R.L. in the formation of Alcoholes Finos Dominicanos (AFD), a large modern distillery which grows its own sugarcane where 40 tons of sugarcane is squeezed per hour and produces about 55,000 liters of alcohol per day, or 18 million liters per year, from the sugarcane juice. The facility has 7 fermentation tanks with a capacity of 200,000 liters, and employs over 220 permanent employees as well as over 600 field workers.

In 2016, Ron Barceló was certified carbon neutral.

In 2025, Barceló entered into a partnership with Disaronno International UK Ltd, and won a trademark dispute case against unauthorized importers in Spain.

Ron Barceló S.R.L. still produces only Ron Barceló, which is sold in over 50 countries, ranking it the 4th largest exporter of rum in the world.

== Production ==
The Barceló family estate is located in San Pedro de Macorís, and contains several warehouses for alcohol aging, blending, bottling, and storage, as well as a laboratory, barrel workshop, and visitors center. The sugarcane is grown, juiced, and distilled at a separate location, at Alcoholes Finos Dominicanos (AFD), which Barceló partially owns. The distillery operates for around 10 months in the year, as "zafra", or harvest season, ends in early October, after which AFD closes for maintenance for eight to ten weeks. The water is sourced from three wells under the distillery and is treated and demineralized.

Before 1999, Barceló sourced its rum from distilleries that used molasses, however since 2010, it is made from sugarcane juice. The juice is then fermented into a wine of around 8% ABV, using a commercial bread yeast, temperature controlled at 35-40°C for around 24 hours. The wine is then distilled to 95% ABV in a series of six-column stills, but only four of the six available columns are used. This process produces a very light, neutral alcohol typical of Spanish-style rum production, though, unlike some countries that blend lighter, more neutral distillate with heavier, more flavorful distillate, such as is common in Cuba, Barceló commissions only very high ABV, neutral rum, so that the only flavor is from barrel aging. White rums are carbon filtered after aging to remove color, and darker rums are chill filtered. The waste product, called vinasse, is removed and used as fertilizer, the bagasse produces almost all of the biofuel energy needed for the distillery, and carbon dioxide is captured during fermentation and sold to third parties. The rum is diluted to 71-72% ABV and matured in toasted ex-Bourbon American oak barrels and ex-wine French oak casks. Barceló has an in-house cooperage which scrapes and chars barrels from medium to high toast (levels 3 to 5). A barrel may be in use for 50 to 70 years in its lifetime, though newer barrels impart more flavor into the rum than older barrels. Due to a prohibition on topping up barrels to adjust for losses to evaporation in the Dominican rum DOP, double-aging is common.

In 2016, Barceló was certified as ISO 14067 carbon neutral by SGS.

Journalists have criticized Barceló for adding sugar to their rums without disclosure.

== Products ==
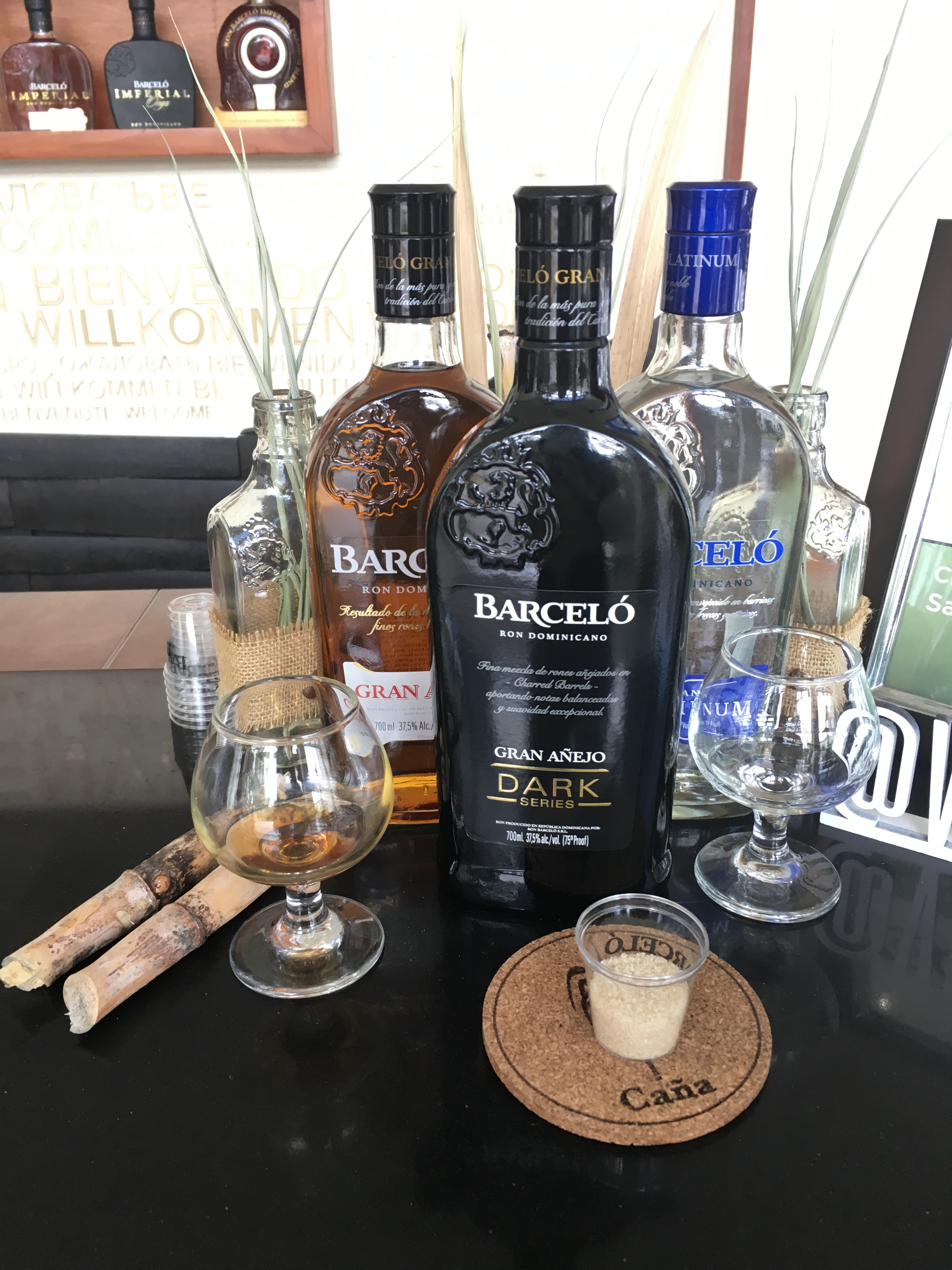
Various Barceló rums

- Dorado - A blend of rums aged for up to two years.
- Blanco - A blend of rums aged for up to two years, then carbon filtered clear.
- Añejo - A blend of rums aged for up to four years.
- Gran Añejo - A blend of rums aged for up to six years.
- Gran Añejo Dark - A blend of rums aged for up to six years in deeply charred barrels.
- Imperial - The flagship expression. A blend of rums aged for up to ten years.
- Imperial Onyx - A blend of rums aged for up to ten years in deeply charred barrels.
- 30th anniversary - A blend of rums aged for up to ten years in ex-bourbon barrels, then two years in French oak barrels.

== Awards ==
In 1999 and 2000, Barceló Imperial scored 97/100 points and won the title of "Best Rum in the World" by the Beverage Tasting Institute of Chicago.
