= Como Abeja al Panal =

Single by Juan Luis Guerra

from the album Bachata Rosa
- Language: Spanish
- B-side: "Woman del Callao"
- Released: 1990
- Recorded: 1989
- Genre: Bachata; Bolero; Salsa
- Length: 4:08
- Label: Karem Records

Juan Luis Guerra singles chronology
"Woman del Callao" (1989)	"Como Abeja al Panal" (1990)	"La Bilirrubina" (1990)

"Como Abeja Al Panal" (English: Like a bee to the honeycomb) is a song by Dominican Republic singer-songwriter Juan Luis Guerra released in 1990 and served as the lead single from his fifth studio album Bachata Rosa (1990). It is a song that tells the story of a forbidden love.

The song was originally released in separate verses in a two-part Commercial for Barceló Rum, as a Bachata with bolero elements and the lyrical overarching storyline of forbidden love, with the male and female lead trading stanzas. The rhythm change to salsa in the Single/CD version is omitted from the Barceló commercials. It was one of Guerra's first international hits and help to contribute to the bachata sophistication along with Estrellitas y Duendes and Bachata Rosa. The track's success demonstrated that tropical music could be fun, danceable and commercial, and at the same time, witty and complex.

== Track listing ==
1. "Como Abeja Al Panal" – 4:09
2. "Woman del Callao" – 4:23

== Charts ==
Chart (1990)	Peak position
Netherlands (Single Top 100)	55
Panama (UPI)	1
Puerto Rico (UPI)	2
US Hot Latin Songs (Billboard)	35
Venezuela (UPI)	5
