= Bachata Rosa =

Studio album by Juan Luis Guerra
- Released: 11 December 1990
- Recorded: 1990; 440 Studio (New York, New York)
- Studios: Audio Proceso (Santo Domingo, Dominican Republic); Estudios EMCA (Santo Domingo); Midilab (Santo Domingo)
- Genres: Bachata; merengue; salsa
- Length: 42:25
- Language: Spanish
- Label: Karen
- Producer: Juan Luis Guerra

Juan Luis Guerra chronology
Ojalá Que Llueva Café (1989)	Bachata Rosa (1990)	Areíto (1992)

Singles from Bachata Rosa
- 1. "Como Abeja al Panal" Released: 1989; 2. "La Bilirrubina" Released: 1990; 3. "Burbujas de Amor" Released: 1990; 4. "A Pedir Su Mano" Released: 1990; 5. "Estrellitas y Duendes" Released: 1991; 6. "Carta de Amor" Released: 1991; 7. "Bachata Rosa" Released: 1991

Bachata Rosa (Spanish for Romantic Bachata, transl. Pink Bachata) is the fifth studio album by Dominican singer-songwriter Juan Luis Guerra and his group 4.40. It was released on 11 December 1990, by Karen Records. It brought bachata music into the mainstream in the Dominican Republic and gave the genre an international audience. A Portuguese version of the record was released in 1992 under the title Romance Rosa; it was certified gold in Brazil. The album received a Grammy Award for Best Tropical Latin Album and two Lo Nuestro Awards for Tropical Album of the Year and Tropical Group of the Year.

Seven singles were released from the record, four of which became top-ten hits on the Billboard Hot Latin Songs chart. The album debuted at number one on the Billboard Tropical Albums. It remained the top-selling album on the chart for 24 weeks and was certified platinum (Latin field) in the United States by the Recording Industry Association of America (RIAA). In Spain, the album spent eight weeks at the number one position on the chart. In the Netherlands, the record peaked at number two on the Mega Album Top 100 and was certified gold. Bachata Rosa was praised by critics, who commended Guerra's songwriting and the record's production, citing it as one of his most important works.

Written and produced by Guerra, the record sold over five million copies worldwide as of 1994. The album's commercial success helped to introduce Bachata and Merengue music to the mainstream audiences across Europe and South America. To promote the album, Guerra embarked on the Bachata Rosa World Tour (1991–92), breaking attendance records. Those commercial and critical achievements, was noted by US mainstream media such as The New York Times, Rolling Stone, The Village Voice and The Wall Street Journal, becoming the first tropical artist to receive this level of recognition. Bachata Rosa topped the charts in Mexico, Spain, Chile, Argentina, Portugal, Holland and Belgium.

== Background ==
At the time, bachata was defined as music from the rural areas of the Dominican Republic with lyrics considered too crude and vulgar to the public's taste. It was characterized by an acoustic guitar accompanied with bongo drums and maracas. After releasing the album Ojalá Que Llueva Café, Juan Luis Guerra began experimenting with the genre by performing bachata alongside Dominican artist Sonia Silvestre on her album Quiero Andar. The result was an early demo of "Como Abeja al Panal" ("Like a Bee to the Hive"). Silvestre said that Guerra was dismayed when he learned that Silvestre's album Quiero Andar was in bachata; he did not become fully committed to the genre until after "Como abeja al panal" was released as a single where it was a hit in the United States. The song was first released for a Barceló TV commercial.

After "Como Abeja al Panal" was released as a single and achieved success, Guerra continued working on bachata music, which served as a key element in Bachata Rosa. Silvestre explained the name of the title by saying that "[Guerra's] bachatas were rosa [rosy] while mine was red". Guerra's bachata focused on the language of the lower-class and used synthesizers for his production whereas Silvestre's bachata relied on a synthesized accordion for her music. Recording took place in the 4-40 studio in New York City, Guerra's personal studio. The album was released by Karen Records.

== Musical style, writing and composition ==
"Burbujas de Amor"
A sample of "Burbujas de Amor", a bachata track in which the performer states his desire to become a fish and make "bubbles of love" in his lover's fishbowl.

"La Bilirrubina"
A sample of "La Bilirrubina", a merengue track which the singer suffers a high bilirubin from love and can only be cured with kisses.

The album consists of ten tracks, including four bachata songs. The album starts with the opening track "Rosalia", an upbeat merengue song. "Como Abeja al Panal" begins as a bachata tune and switches to salsa music in the middle of the song, falling back to bachata toward the end. "Carta de Amor" is a salsa track in which he writes a letter to his lover in his journal, punctuation marks included. "Estrellitas y Duendes" ("Little Stars and Elves") is a bachata about living in his love's memories as a rain-shower of little stars and elves. "A Pedir Su Mano" ("Asking for Her Hand") is a cover of Lea Lignanzi's song "Dédé Priscilla" from the Central African Republic which combines merengue and Afropop.

"La Bilirrubina" ("The Bilirubin") is a merengue song that describes a man in a hospital suffering from a high level of bilirubin from love and jealousy, which can only be cured by kisses, as no shots nor surgery are effective. "Burbujas de Amor" ("Bubbles of Love") is a sexual bachata song about a man's desire to become a fish and "make bubbles of love" in his lover's fishbowl. The lyrics for the song "Bachata Rosa" were inspired by the opening lines of the poem "Book of Questions" by Chilean poet Pablo Neruda. The last track "Acompáñeme Civil" is a merengue song performed by Beny Peregina which deals with social awareness.

== Commercial reception ==
=== Album ===
Bachata Rosa introduced bachata music to mainstream audience in the world and was instrumental in bringing it to the attention of listeners worldwide. The album was a major commercial success in the Dominican Republic and international markets, surpassing previous standards set by Fernando Villalona. It sold more than 3.5 million copies worldwide by 1991 and Guerra’s North American tour also set attendance record in that same year.

In the United States, Bachata Rosa debuted at number one on the Billboard Tropical Albums on the week of 12 January 1991. It remained there for 24 nonconsecutive weeks and was best selling Tropical album of the year in the United States. It peaked at number 19 on Billboard Top Latin Albums during the week of 24 July 1993. In 2004, the album was certified platinum (Latin field) by the RIAA for shipments of 100,000 copies.During 1991, the album sold more than 400,000 copies in the United States. Due the album success, Juan Luis Guerra was named Top Tropical /Salsa Artist of 1991.

Also, Bachata Rosa was a success across reaching the first places in many Latin America countries selling over 200,000 copies in Chile and 200,000 copies in Puerto Rico. In Argentina, it was the second best selling album of 1991 with 350,000 copies sold. Eventually, it become one of the best selling albums of all-time in Argentina with 420,000 copies sold. In Mexico, it was a massive commercial success reaching the number one spot in the charts and selling over one millions of copies.

Bachata Rosa also had a lot of impact in Europe. In Spain, the album reached number one on the Productores de Música de España chart, where it spent eight weeks. selling 530,000 copies in it first year of released. It eventually sold more than 1 million of copies in Spain. The massive album success caused a sales surge on his previous albums, holding the first and second placespot at the Spanish Album Charts simultaneously for several weeks with Ojala que Llueva Cafe in 1991, becoming the first band ever to do so. In Portugal, Bachata Rosa was the 5th Best Selling Album of 1991. Also, The album reached the top 10 in the Belgium Albums Chart.

In Holland, Juan Luis Guerra topped the chart for three weeks, selling over 80,000 copies. The album also performed well in the Netherlands, where it peaked at number two on the Mega Album Top 100 chart and was certified gold by the NVPI. A Portuguese version, titled Romance Rosa, was released in 1992. It also contained songs from his earlier albums performed in Portuguese. It was certified gold in Brazil by the Associação Brasileira dos Produtores de Discos for sales of 100,000 copies a peaked at number two on the best selling CDs retail charts.

As of 1994, the album had sold over five million copies worldwide.

=== Singles ===
"Como Abeja al Panal" was the first single released from the album. It peaked at 31 on the Billboard Hot Latin Songs chart in 1989 and 55 on Mega Single Top 100 in the Netherlands. It peaked at number 5 and 2 in Puerto Rico and Venezuela Airplay.

"La Bilirrubina" was the second single released from the album. It reached number nine on the Hot Latin Songs chart and number 2 in Peru.

The third single, "Burbujas de Amor", was the most successful single from the album. It peaked at number two on the Hot Latin Songs chart, and it was in force during the week of 1 September 1990, where it was three non-consecutive weeks. Also, it peaked at number one on Mexico Airplay, Chile and Uruguay. Also, it peaked at 3 in Ecuador and San Salvador and 9 in Venezuela Also, was positioned in number three on the Mega Single Top 100, Number 3 in Holland, number 3 in Puerto Rico Number 4 in Belgium, 1 In Portugal. and number 45 in the Eurochart 100 Singles.

The music video for the song features Guerra performing from a porch as he watches a couple dancing in the rain. The fourth single, "A Pedir Su Mano," peaked at 13 on the Hot Latin Songs chart, number 7 in Peru, Number 3 in Colombia, Number 2 in Cuba, Number 3 in Venezuela and 9 in Panama. The music video shows people in traditional African dress dancing in sugarcane fields with a cartoon of a red train traversing the landscape.

"Estrellitas y Duendes", the fifth single released from the album, peaked at number three on the Hot Latin Tracks. Number 2 in Dominican Republic, Number one in Cuba and Number 7 in Spain.

The sixth single "Carta de Amor" peaked at 35 on the Hot Latin Songs.

The last single released from the album was "Bachata Rosa", which peaked at 15 on the Hot Latin Songs chart. Also, it peaked at number one in Mexico, 7 in Colombia, 6 in Panama and 10 in Uruguay. The Portuguese version, reached 9 in Brazil Airplay.

=== Tour ===
To promote the album, Guerra embakerd at the Bachata Rosa World Tour, with tour stops throughout United States, Latin America and Europe, drew over 350,000 fans.

The United States leg, visited 10 cities and Billboard stated that "The first U.S. tour by Juan Luis Guerra & 4.40, the Latin equivalent of Michael Jackson's tour". The leg broke attendance records and the average price ticket was $35, higher than many rock stars at the time. The concerts in New York on 25–27 November 1991 at the Paramount, drew more than 15,000 and grossed over US$590,000 and Los Angeles gig on 23–24 November, at the two concerts at the Universal Amphitheatre had an attendance of 10,889 and gross US$332,644. In Miami, the concert at Miami arena was sold out and drew over 12,000 fans. The US leg finished up with two concerts 14–15 Dec at the Meadowlands Convention Center in East Rutherford, N.J. The concert in Miami Arena on 1 December 1991, was sold out with an attendance of 12,000.

In Mexico, he performed on 12 September 1991, in a sold-out concert in Mexico City on Palacio de los deportes in front of 10,000 fans. The tour also visited other cities such as, Villa Hermosa, Tabasco, Guadalajara, Monterrey, Ciudad Juarez Toluca, Pachuca and Comarca Laguenra. However, the concert at the Estado Revolución in Torreon was canceled due to bad weather and poor tickets sales. The tour wrapped at El Auditorio Nacional in Mexico City, on 7 and 8 September.

In Spain, the tour had 17 concerts across Spain in July and August including a sold out 22,000 capacity Madrid bullring two nights in a row and leaving thousands of fans stranded outside in the street. The concert in Barcelona drew 20,000 fans. The concert in Gijon at Hipodromo de Mestas, 30,000 fans attended. Over 250,000 tickets were sold in total. Following that, he performed in Belgium, Germany and France.

In Chile, Juan Luis Guerra performed for the first time in February 1991 at XXXII Viña del Mar International Song Festival. During the tour, he signed a more than million dollars sponsor deal with Pepsi. In Santo Domingo, Dominican Republic, Guerra performed at Estadio Olimpico with a record audience of 80,000 fans on 24 December 1991.

In 1992 he toured in Latin America; he performed on 20 and 21 June in Managua at Estadio Nacional in front of 70,000 fans. Also, he performed in Paraguay, Chile, Costa Rica, Guatemala, Venezuela, Ecuador, Uruguay and Peru. In Buenos Aires, Argentina, Guerra performed four consecutive sold-out concert on 22–25 May at the Luna Park selling over 32,000 tickets and grossing US$800,000. The last leg of the tour that was scheduled to visit some countries in South America and Brazil, was suspended due to an eye surgery. The tour ended in Dominican Republic with a sold-out show at the Estadio Olimpico.

== Critical reception ==
Professional ratings
Review scores
Source	Rating
AllMusic	4.5/5 stars
Los Angeles Times	3/4 stars

The album was praised by critics. Jason Birchmeier of Allmusic gave Bachata Rosa 4.5 out of 5 stars and referred to the record as a "milestone effort", writing "Not only is it his career-defining work, it's also one of the finest tropical albums of its era, or any other, for that matter". Don Snowden of the Los Angeles Times gave the album a 3 out of 4 star rating and praised the arrangements of the album as "punchy" and "well-crafted".

At the 34th Grammy Awards, the album received the award for Best Tropical Latin Album. At the 1991 Lo Nuestro Awards, Guerra received three awards: Tropical Song of the Year for "Burbujas de Amor", Video of the Year for the music video of "A Pedir Su Mano", and Tropical Group of the Year. A year later, Guerra received two Lo Nuestro awards: Tropical Album of the Year and Tropical Group of the Year.

Carlos Aguelo of the Latin section of Billboard magazine, named Bachata Rosa best album of 1990 and "Burbujas de Amor" best song. In 2006, the Chicago Tribune ranked 19 at their Best-albums list covers gamut of genres list on the Latin section. In 2023, ACROARATE included Bachata Rosa on the 100 Essential Albums of Dominican Music List by ACROARTE. In 2024, Bachata Rosa ranked at the 221st of the 600 best Latin American album list website.

== Legacy ==
Prior to the release of Bachata Rosa, bachata was generally regarded as lower-class music in the Dominican Republic and did not receive media attention. After Guerra released the album, bachata became socially accepted by the middle- and upper-classes. The genre became mainstream in the Dominican Republic, and the success of the album provided the genre with international exposure. In 2015, Billboard listed Bachata Rosa as one of the Essential Latin Albums of Past 50 Years stating that "Guerra created an uplifting, love-themed experience from start to finish and stretched bachata's limits by playing with merengue, salsa and Afro-Caribbean rhythms". Before Guerra's commercial success the only Caribbean rhythm known in Europe was Reggae. Bachata Rosa along with Ojala que Llueva Cafe (1989) are widely recognized for introducing merengue and bachata music to the mainstream in Europe and South America.

After Juan Luís Guerra's Bachata Rosa, many other artists have been recognized as important to the growth of the genre from the 1990s to the turn of the century including Luis Vargas, Antony Santos, Raulín Rodríguez and Elvis Martínez.Bachata Rosa's success paved the way for many other established bachateros to travel to New York City and other parts of the U.S. to perform for Dominicans and the greater Latino community as well. According to Music&Media, Guerra was the first Latin artist to gain major success in Spain and following the success of the album named the artist the most important Latin artist of the decade. In 1995, BMG Ariola Spain international label manager Antonio Garcia Oñate stated "Juan Luis Guerra has undoubtedly helped open the market for Latin American music."

== Track listing ==
All tracks are written by Juan Luis Guerra, except where noted.

No.	Title	Writer(s)	Length
1.	"Rosalía"		3:26
2.	"Como Abeja al Panal"		4:05
3.	"Carta de Amor"		4:41
4.	"Estrellitas y Duendes"		4:28
5.	"A Pedir Su Mano"	Lea Lignanzy	4:56
6.	"La Bilirrubina"		4:05
7.	"Burbujas de Amor"		4:12
8.	"Bachata Rosa"		4:20
9.	"Reforéstame" (performed by Adalgisa Pantaleon)		4:11
10.	"Acompáñeme, Civil" (performed by Benny Peregina)		5:00

=== Romance Rosa ===
All tracks are written by Juan Luis Guerra, except where noted.

No.	Title	Writer(s)	Length
1.	"Romance Rosa"		4:14
2.	"Borbulhas de Amor"		4:08
3.	"A Bilirrubina"		5:31
4.	"Estrellitas y Duendes"		4:24
5.	"Guavaberry"		6:34
6.	"Oxalá Que Chova Café"		4:13
7.	"Como Abelha no Mel"		4:05
8.	"A Pedir sua Mão"	Lea Lignanzy	4:53
9.	"Carta de Amor"		4:53
10.	"Mujer de Callao"	Julio César Delgado	4:17
11.	"La Bilirrubina"		4:02
12.	"Bachata Rosa"		4:15
Total length:			48:55

== Personnel ==
The following credits are from AllMusic and from the Bachata Rosa liner notes:

Juan Luis Guerra y 440

- Juan Luis Guerra – vocals, guitar
- Juan de la Cruz – timbal, tambora, batá
- Daniel Peña – saxophone on "Acompáñeme, Civil"
- Armando Beltre – trumpet on "Burbujas de Amor" and "Como Abeja al Panal"
- Roberto Olea – trombone
- Elvis Cabrera – piano, synthesizer
- Marco Hernández – synthesizer
- Osvaldo Cesa – bass
- Roger Zayas-Bazán – Yamaha RX8
- Pedro Peralta – congas
- Rafael Guzmán – güira
- Isidro Bobadilla – percussion
- Adalgisa Pantaleón – vocals on "Reforéstame"

Additional personnel

- Luisín del Rosario – saxophone
- Santiago Martínez – timbal
- Fermín Cruz – trumpet
- Manuel Tejada – piano, synthesizer, sequencer
- Janina Rosado – piano
- Gonzalo Rubalcaba – piano
- Héctor Santana – bass
- Guy Frometa – drums
- Alberto Machuca – bongos, cencerro
- Gadwin Vargas – congas
- Héctor "Pichie" Pérez – güiro, maracas
- Henry García – güiro on "Como Abeja al Panal", background vocals
- Robert Jeand'or – bass and maracas on "Como Abeja al Panal", background vocals
- Mariela Mercado – background vocals
- Sonia Silvestre – background vocals
- Víctor Víctor – background vocals
- John Fausty – engineer, mixing
- Marco Félix – engineer
- Carlos Molina – engineer
- Sonny Hernández – engineer
- July Ruiz – mixing on "La Bilirrubina"
- Sammy Velázquez – mixing on "Como Abeja al Panal"

== Charts ==
=== Weekly charts ===
Weekly chart performance for Bachata Rosa
Chart (1991–1993)	Peak position
Argentinian Albums (CAPIF)	1
Belgium Albums (IFPI Belgium)	8
Brazilian Albums (ABPD)	2
Cuban Albums (Billboard)	1
Dutch Albums (Album Top 100)	1
European Top 100 Albums (Music & Media)	14
Mexican Albums (AMPROFON)	1
Portuguese Albums (AFP)	1
Spanish Albums (AFYVE)	1
US Tropical Albums (Billboard)	1

Chart (2004)	Peak position
Argentinian Albums (CAPIF)	19

=== All-time charts ===
All-time chart performance for Cuenta Conmigo
Chart (1985–1994)	Position
US Tropical Albums (Billboard)	3

=== Year-end charts ===
1991 year-end chart performance for Bachata Rose
Chart (1991)	Peak position
European Albums (Top 100)	37
US Tropical Albums (Billboard)	1

1992 year-end chart performance for Bachata Rose
Chart (1992)	Peak position
Argentinian Albums (CAPIF)	11
US Tropical Albums (Billboard)	6

== Certifications and sales ==
Certifications and sales for Bachata Rosa
Region	Certification	Certified units/sales
Argentina (CAPIF)	5× Platinum	420,000
Brazil (Pro-Música Brasil) for Romance Rosa	Gold	150,000
Chile	—	300,000
Mexico	—	1,000,000
Netherlands (NVPI)	Gold	80,000
Spain (Promusicae)	7× Platinum	1,000,000
United States (RIAA)	Platinum (Latin)	500,000
Venezuela	—	250,000
Summaries
Worldwide	—	5,000,000

== See also ==
- 1990 in Latin music
- Music of the Dominican Republic
- List of number-one Billboard Tropical Albums from the 1990s
- List of number-one albums of 1991 (Spain)
- List of best-selling albums by country
- List of best-selling albums in Argentina
- List of best-selling albums in Chile
- List of best-selling albums in Mexico
- List of best-selling albums in Spain
- List of best-selling Latin albums
