= Burbujas de Amor =

Single by Juan Luis Guerra

from the album Bachata Rosa
- B-side: "A Pedir Su Mano"
- Released: 1990
- Recorded: 1990
- Genre: Bachata
- Length: 4:09
- Label: Karem
- Songwriter: Juan Luis Guerra

Juan Luis Guerra singles chronology
"La Bilirrubina" (1990)	"Burbujas de Amor" (1990)	"A Pedir Su Mano" (1990)

"Burbujas de Amor" ("Love Bubbles") is a song by Dominican singer-songwriter Juan Luis Guerra, released as the third single of his album Bachata Rosa (1990). It is widely considered one of Guerra's most popular songs. The song was a commercial success and became an international hit in Europe and Latin America. It peaked at number 2 on the Hot Latin Songs chart. The track received universal acclaim from critics and was praised for its sophisticated lyrics and elegance. The song was marketed as a bachata; however, its musical form is actually bolero.

In 1990, Burbujas de Amor was rated 8th of the Top Hot Latin Tracks in the United States by Billboard magazine. It was named Song of the Year of 1990 by Billboard's Latin music critics. The song won Tropical/Salsa Song of the Year at Premios Lo Nuestro 1991. In 2015, it was placed 8th on Billboard's Top 50 Best Latin Songs of All Time. It was listed at number 21 on Rolling Stone's list of 50 Greatest Latin Pop Songs in 2018.

It was covered by the Brazilian singer Fagner as Borbulhas de Amor.

== Track listing ==
1. Burbujas de Amor - 4:09
2. A Pedir Su Mano - 4:54

== Charts ==
Chart (1991–92)	Peak position
Belgium (Ultratop 50 Flanders)	2
Bolivia (EFE)	5
Chile (IFPI)	1
Dominican Republic (UPI)	2
Ecuador (UPI)	3
El Salvador (UPI)	3
Europe (European Hot 100 Singles)	54
Mexico (AMPROFON)	1
Netherlands (Dutch Top 40)	3
Netherlands (Single Top 100)	3
Peru (UPI)	8
Portugal (AFP)	1
Puerto Rico (UPI)	1
Uruguay (UPI)	1
US Hot Latin Songs (Billboard)	2
Venezuela (UPI)	7
Chart (2009)	Peak Position
Nicaraguay Airplay (EFE)	1

== See also ==
- List of number-one hits of 1991 (Mexico)
