= Colección Romantica =

Colección Romántica

Compilation album / Greatest hits album by Juan Luis Guerra
- Released: November 21, 2000 (Europe) February 6, 2001 (USA)
- Recorded: 1986–2001
- Genre: Latin, latin pop, bachata
- Length: 42:02 (Disc 1) 39:58 (Disc 2) 81:25 (Total)
- Label: Karen Records

Juan Luis Guerra chronology
Ni Es Lo Mismo Ni Es Igual (1998)	Colección Romántica (2000)	Para Ti (2004)

Singles from Colección Romántica
- 1. "Quisiera" Released: 2001

Professional ratings
Review scores
Source	Rating
Allmusic	4.5/5 stars

Colección Romántica is a compilation album by Dominican songwriter and musician Juan Luis Guerra and 4.40. It was released in November 21, 2000 and February 6, 2001 in the United States by Karen Records. It is a dual album compilation including 20 of the group's classic songs remastered and re-recorded as ballads. The album also contained unaltered original versions of their softer songs, like acoustic ballads or bachatas. It would become Guerra's last album released under the Dominican independent music label Karen Records, as his later albums would be released under Vene Music and subsequently under EMI music and Capitol Latin.

The album includes new versions of the tracks ("Tu"; "Ay Mujer" and "Razones") and live version of the song "Estrellitas y Duendes" recorded at La Plaza de Las Ventas in Madrid in 1992.Also it include, the orchestrations mesmerizing on such one-of-a-kind hits as "Bachata rosa," "Burbujas de amor, " and "Paimolita blanca." The tracks; Tu and Estrellitas y Duendes were released as promotional singles. The album sold 50,000 copies on it first week in Spain and was certified platinum (Latin field) for selling 100,000 copies in the United States. It won Tropical/Salsa Album of the Year - Group at the 2002 Billboard Latin Music Awards.

== Track listing ==
All tracks are written by Juan Luis Guerra.

Disc 1
No.	Title	Length
1.	"Tú (Ballad)"	4:51
2.	"Razones"	3:50
3.	"¡Ay! Mujer"	3:58
4.	"Quisiera"	4:02
5.	"Amor de Conuco"	3:12
6.	"Amigos"	4:42
7.	"Estrellitas y Duendes (Live!)"	5:05
8.	"Como Abeja al Panal"	4:07
9.	"Burbujas de Amor"	4:10
10.	"Frío Frío"	3:50
Total length:		41:47

All tracks are written by Juan Luis Guerra.

Disc 2
No.	Title	Length
1.	"Bachata Rosa"	4:13
2.	"Cuando te Beso"	3:28
3.	"Estrellitas y Duendes"	4:23
4.	"La Hormiguita"	3:54
5.	"Vivire"	4:00
6.	"Palomita Blanca"	3:45
7.	"Amapola"	3:05
8.	"Coronita de Flores"	4:18
9.	"Señales de Humo"	5:32
10.	"Testimonio"	4:17
Total length:		40:55

== Charts ==
Chart (2001)	Peak Position
Dominican Albums (Musicalia)	9
Spanish Albums (PROMUSICAE)	9
US Top Latin Albums (Billboard)	6
US Tropical Albums (Billboard)	1
U.S. Billboard Top Heatseekers	16
Charts (2005)	Peak Position
Argentina Albums (CAPIF)	14

== Sales and certifications ==
Region	Certification	Certified units/sales
Spain (Promusicae)	Gold	50,000^{^}
United States (RIAA)	Platinum (Latin)	100,000^{^}
^{^} Shipments figures based on certification alone.
