= Estrellitas y Duendes =

Single by Juan Luis Guerra

from the album Bachata Rosa
- B-side: "A Pedir Su Mano"
- Released: 1991
- Recorded: 1990
- Genre: Bachata; Bolero
- Length: 4:28
- Label: Karen Records
- Songwriter: Juan Luis Guerra

Juan Luis Guerra singles chronology
| "A Pedir Su Mano" (1990) | "Estrellitas y Duendes" (1991) | "Carta de Amor" (1991) |

Estrellitas y Duendes (English: Little Stars and Goblins) is a song by Dominican Republic singer-songwriter Juan Luis Guerra released as the fifth single for his album Bachata Rosa (1990). It was released in 1991 by Karem Records. The track is a Bachata with elements of Bolero. It reached the top-ten on the US Billboard Hot Latin Songs and his native Dominican Republic. A live version of the track was later included on Coleccion Romantica (2001).

== Tracklist ==
- Colombia 7", 45 RPM Single
  1. Estrellitas y Duendes – 4:28
  2. A Pedir Su Mano – 4:51

== Charts ==
| Chart (1991) | Peak position |
|---|---|
| Dominican Republic (UPI) | 2 |
| Honduras (EFE) | 4 |
| US Hot Latin Songs (Billboard) | 7 |
