= A Son de Guerra Tour (album) =

Live album by Juan Luis Guerra
- Released: May 14, 2013
- Recorded: June 16, 2012
- Venue: Estadio Olimpico Felix Sanchez (Santo Domingo, Dominican Republic)
- Genre: Merengue · bachata
- Length: 54:19
- Label: Capitol Latin

Juan Luis Guerra chronology
| Coleccion Cristiana (2012) | A Son de Guerra Tour (2013) | Todo Tiene Su Hora (2014) |

Singles from A Son de Guerra Tour
- 1. "Frio Frio (Live)" Released: March 8, 2013

A Son de Guerra Tour, stylized Asondeguerra Tour, is a live album from Dominican singer Juan Luis Guerra. It was recorded during the A Son de Guerra World Tour at Santo Domingo in front of 42,000 audience.

== Reception ==
Thom Jurek of AllMusic gave the album a positive review and wrote "This is a stellar live offering, impeccably performed and recorded"

A Son de Guerra Tour debuted and peaked at number 80 on the Billboard 200. It also peaked and debuted at number one in the Billboard Top Latin Albums and Tropical Albums charts. A Son de Guerra Tour won the Contemporary Tropical Album in 2013.

== Track listing ==
All tracks are written by Juan Luis Guerra.

| No. | Title | Length |
|---|---|---|
| 1. | "Apaga y Vamonos" | 3:29 |
| 2. | "La Bilirrubina" | 3:52 |
| 3. | "La Travesia" | 3:26 |
| 4. | "La Llave de mi Corazon" | 4:00 |
| 5. | "Mi Bendicion" | 3:36 |
| 6. | "La Calle" (featuring Juanes) | 4:22 |
| 7. | "El Niagara en Bicicleta" | 4:31 |
| 8. | "Visa para un sueño" | 3:42 |
| 9. | "Frio, Frio" (featuring Romeo Santos) | 3:55 |
| 10. | "Las Avispas" | 3:30 |
| 11. | "Bachata en Fukuoka" | 3:37 |
| 12. | "La Guagua" | 3:44 |
| 13. | "En el Cielo No Hay Hospital)" | 3:12 |
| 14. | "Ojala Que Llueva Cafe" | 5:23 |
| Total length: | | 54:19 |

== Charts ==
=== Weekly charts ===
| Chart (2013–14) | Peak position |
|---|---|
| Argentinian Albums (CAPIF) | 7 |
| Mexican Albums (AMPROFON) | 6 |
| Peruans Albums (Phantom) | 2 |
| US Billboard 200 | 80 |
| US Top Latin Albums (Billboard) | 1 |
| US Tropical Albums (Billboard) | 1 |

=== Year-end charts ===
| Chart (2013) | Position |
|---|---|
| Argentinian Albums (CAPIF) | 42 |
| US Top Latin Albums (Billboard) | 19 |
| US Tropical Albums (Billboard) | 7 |

| Chart (2014) | Position |
|---|---|
| US Tropical Albums (Billboard) | 9 |

== Sales and certifications ==
| Region | Certification | Certified units/sales |
|---|---|---|
| Colombia (ASINCOL) | Gold | |
| Ecuador (IFPE) | Gold | |
| Mexico (AMPROFON) | Gold | 30,000^{^} |
^{^} Shipments figures based on certification alone.
