= Ojalá Que Llueva Café =

Studio album by Juan Luis Guerra
- Released: 25 April 1989
- Recorded: 1988–89
- Studios: Estudios EMCA; (Santo Domingo, Dominican Republic)
- Genres: Merengue; bachata
- Length: 32:05
- Label: Karen Records
- Producer: Juan Luis Guerra

Juan Luis Guerra chronology
Mientras Más Lo Pienso...Tú (1987)	Ojalá Que Llueva Café (1989)	Bachata Rosa (1990)

Singles from Ojalá Que Llueva Café
- 1. "Ojalá Que Llueva Café" Released: 20 March 1989; 2. "Visa para un Sueño" Released: 5 June 1989; 3. "Reina Mía" Released: 4 September 1989

Ojalá Que Llueva Café (transl. "I Wish That It Rains Coffee") is the fourth studio album by Dominican singer-songwriter Juan Luis Guerra released in 1989 by Karen Records. It is considered one of his most emblematic and important albums. The album set the musical path for his later albums, re-formulating Dominican merengue and bachata music through the contemporary elements of pop, rock, salsa, or jazz. Incorporating socially conscious lyrics with danceable merengues and romantic-poetic bachatas, the album is considered one of the most important albums of his discography.

The album received universal acclaim and is considered one of his best albums. Critics praised the artistic growth and innovation it demonstrated. Considered by fans and critics "the album that made him a star", the album was supported by the hits including the rock/blues-influenced "Woman del Callao", "Visa para un Sueño," and the gospel-influenced "La Gallera" contained socially conscious lyrics. The title track, "Ojalá Que Llueva Café", a social criticism endured by rural Dominicans, is considered one of his most emblematic and recognized songs. Its music video (directed by Peyi Guzmán) is considered one of the best music videos in Dominican history. The song was later covered by Café Tacuba on their album Avalancha de Éxitos.

Commercially, the project became Juan Luis Guerra's breakthrough album, with which he established himself as a superstar throughout Latin America and Europe. Also, it was his first album to gain international commercial success, topping the charts in many Latin American countries and Europe. In the United States, it was the third best selling tropical album of 1990. It sold over 2.5 million copies, including 400,000 copies in Spain. Following the success of Bachata Rosa (1990) and Areíto (1992), album sales remained strong from discovery by new audiences. To promote the record, Guerra embarked on the Ojalá Que Llueva Café Tour (1990–1991).

== Background and recording ==
Mundaza y Acarreo and Mientras Mas Lo Pienso... Tu were the first commercial successful works of the band selling over two millions of copies between Latin America and United States. At the beginning of the recording sessions, the singer Maridalia Hernández resigned from the group to continue her career as a soloist. Following her departure, the musician and composer Marco Hernández and the singer Milagros Taveras were incorporated. On a joint tour of Juan Luis Guerra and his group with fellow Dominicans Rubby Pérez and Sergio Vargas, through Venezuela, the bus that was transporting the musicians had an accident in which percussionist Ángel Miro Andújar, nicknamed "Catarey", died. 17 July 1988. Upon returning from the failed tour, Milagros Taveras separated from the group and Guerra did not want to continue leading the group, falling into a kind of "lethargy."

However, Bienvenido Rodríguez, president of Karen Records, convinced Guerra that the best tribute he could do to the deceased musician was to record again. Guerra composed the song "Ángel para una Tambora" in honor of Andújar and replaced the deceased musician with the percussionist Juan De la Cruz. After this, Guerra recorded the title track "Ojalá Que Llueva Café", which was the first single released in June 1989, and included the participation of the Dominican children's choir "Retoños," in which Laura Rivera Taveras, daughter of Milagros Taveras, sang. This song became the most emblematic social song of the highly successful Guerra, whose video clip was directed by Peyi Guzmán and shot in the Southern Region of the Dominican Republic and was named to the first place of Top 15 Best Dominican music videos of all time.

This album includes "Razones," which was Guerra's second foray into the salsa genre since the LP record "Soplando," for whose recording sessions the musicians included the Cuban pianist Gonzalo Rubalcaba. Due to the wide dissemination of the music of the now defunct Venezuelan musical group Un solo pueblo, Guerra included in the sessions, the calypso "Woman del Callao" by the Venezuelan singer-songwriter Julio Delgado. Later, "Woman del Callao", "Visa for a dream" and "De tu boca" were released, of which a remixed version was made. Some time later, Karen Records released a CD version of the album that respected the order of the songs from Side "A" to "B" in said edition.

== Critical reception ==
Professional ratings
Review scores
Source	Rating
AllMusic	5/5 stars

The album received universal acclaim from critics and music fans. For many, it is considered his best album and his most emblematic.

Carlos Agudelo, from the section of Latin Notas of Billboard, praised the musical structure of the album and wrote, "Practically all the songs, while keeping the freshness and happiness of tropical music, are almost experimental pieces that seek to blend merengue with such genres as pop and jazz." He also praised the lyrical content and stated, they "are truly poetic and meaningful, deep expressions of the Caribbean popular experience. With their music, Guerra and his partners -classically educated musicians -have given merengue another, richer dimension".

Mariano Prunes from AllMusic wrote: "Ojalá Que Llueva Café is both his first masterpiece and the album that made him a star". Fernando Gonzales from The Boston Globe, ranked the album at the Top 10 Records of 1990. Also, the album was included on the 100 Essential Albums of Dominican Music.Ojalá Que Llueva Café was ranked at 19 of the 600 best albums of Latin America website.

== Commercial reception ==
In the United States, Ojalá Que Llueva Café debuted at number 21 on the Billboard Tropical Albums for the week of 9 September 1989. It peaked at number 2. According to Cashbox It peaked at number 3 on the Miami Latin LPs sales. In Puerto Rico, the album debuted at number four on the Cashbox Puerto Rican LPs for the week 25 November 1989. It later peaked at number 1. It was the third best selling Top Tropical/Salsa of 1990 in the United States, and Juan Luis Guerra and 4.40 was named Top Selling Tropical/Salsa Latin of 1990. Following the massive success of the following records, album sales for Ojalá Que Llueva Café remained strong for the next years. It was 17th Best selling tropical album in the United States of 1993. In Spain, the album was released in June 1990. It peaked at number 2 behind his own Bachata Rosa. As of August 1991, it sold over 270,000 copies. It eventually sold more than 400,000 in the country. The album was certified three times platinum. As of September 1993, it sold over 500,000 copies in Spain.

Ojalá Que Llueva Café is considered the album that made Juan Luis Guerra a global superstar status and Latin Sensation. Also, it was his first album to top the charts in many Latin American and European countries and to have had significant sales. The album reached the top 10 in Puerto Rico and Argentina and US Latin Album Charts. The album success opened new markets in Europe, Mexico and the United States, while at the same time, Latin artists like Ana Belén, Luis Miguel and Emmanuel were recording his songs. As of the end of 1993, it had sold over 2.5 million copies worldwide.

The lead single "Ojalá Que Llueva Café" was his first single to debut on the US Hot Latin Tracks, at number 27 for the week of 14 October 1989, and reached number 21.

=== Tour ===
To promote the album, Guerra Embarked on the Ojalá Que Llueva Café Tour (1990–1991) which included sold-out concerts at New York's Madison Square Garden and Miami's James Knight Center, as well as venues in many Latin American countries. In December 1990, Guerra performed at Cali, Bogotá and Barranquilla in Colombia.

In Puerto Rico, he performed on 6, 7 and 8 April 1991 at the Centro de Bellas Artes. Also, he performed at Teresa Carreño Theater in Caracas, Venezuela, and Altos de Chavón Amphitheater in La Romana, Dominican Republic with a record attendance of 8,000 fans.

== Track listing ==
All tracks are written by Juan Luis Guerra.

Side A
No.	Title	Length
1.	"Visa para un Sueño"	3:28
2.	"Ojalá Que Llueva Café"	4:13
3.	"Razones"	3:59
4.	"De Tu Boca"	4:44

Side B
No.	Title	Writer(s)	Length
5.	"La Gallera"		3:55
6.	"Woman del Callao"	Julio César Delgado	4:22
7.	"Reina Mía"		4:06
8.	"Ángel para una Tambora"		3:18
Total length:			32:05

== Personnel ==
The following credits are from AllMusic and from the Ójala Que Llueva Café liner notes:

- Primary Artist - 440
- Trumpet - Kaki Ruiz
- Children's Chorus - Retoños
- Mixing - July Ruiz
- Drums - Guy Frometa
- Lead Vocals - Roger Zayas
- Trombone - Roberto Olea
- Bass - Jaime Querol
- Mixing - Jose Frometa
- Trumpet - Fermin Crúz
- Arranger, Synthesizer - Manuel Tejada
- Piano - Janina Rosado
- Congas - Rafael Medrano
- Trumpet - Armando Beltre
- Bass - Hector Santana
- Maracas - Robert Jeandor
- Lead Vocals - Mariela Mercado
- Composer, Guitar, Primary Artist, Vocals - Juan Luis Guerra
- Guira - Isidro de la Cruz
- Mixing - Salvador Morales
- Congas - Alberto Martinez
- Piano - Gonzalo Rubalcaba
- Composer - Julio Cesar Delgado
- Saxophone - Crispin Fernández
- Primary Artist - Juan Luis Guerra y 440

== Charts ==
Weekly chart performance for Ojalá Que Llueva Café
Chart (1989–93)	Peak position
Argentinian Albums (CAPIF)	8
European Top 100 Albums	44
Miami Latin LPs (Cashbox)	3
Spanish Albums (PROMUSICAE)	2
Puerto Rico Latin LPs (Cashbox)	1
US Top Latin Albums (Billboard)	40
US Tropical Albums (Billboard)	2

== Certifications and sales ==
Certification and Sales for "Ojalá Que Llueva Café"
Region	Certification	Certified units/sales
Spain (Promusicae)	3× Platinum	300,000^{^}
^{^} Shipments figures based on certification alone.
