= Privé =

EP by Juan Luis Guerra
- Released: December 25, 2020
- Recorded: 2020
- Studio: JLG Studios (Santo Domingo, Dominican Republic)
- Genres: Son; pambiche; acoustic
- Length: 17:04
- Language: Spanish
- Label: Universal Music Latino
- Producers: Juan Luis Guerra & Janina Rosado

Juan Luis Guerra chronology
Literal (2019)	Privé (2020)	Entre Mar y Palmeras (2021)

Singles from Privé
- 1. "Pambiche de novia" Released: December 25, 2020

Privé is the first EP by the Dominican artist Juan Luis Guerra. It was released on December 25, 2020, and was distributed Universal Music Latin. It consisted in three new versions of Guerra's previous hits Las Avispas, Ojalá Que Llueva Cafe and Pedir Su Mano with acoustic arrangements and two new songs, Pambiche Pa` Mi Novia which was the lead single and "Donde Naces Tus Besos". The EP production consisted in an intimate sound based and oriented on Son and a slow version of merengue called Pambiche and with elements of jazz, blues, bossa nova and classical music along with the use of instruments piano, guitar, guira, vibraphone and saxophone. Privé was produced by Juan Luis Guerra and co-produced by his longtime arranger Janina Rosado.

The release of Privé was accompanied by a TV Christmas special and livestream in which Guerra performed the five songs and recorded on the backyard of his house in his natal Santo Domingo, Dominican Republic, it was directed and produced by Guerra's own son, Jean Guerra. It was later upload to digital platforms.

Privé received critical acclaim from fans and critics and was nominated for Album of the Year at the 22nd Annual Latin Grammy Awards and the lead single, Pambiche Pa` Mi Novia was nominated for Best Tropical Song. Eventually, It won Best Traditional Pop Vocal Album in the same ceremony and Best Arrangement for the Privé version of Ojala Que Llueva Cafe.

== Track listing ==
All tracks are written by Juan Luis Guerra.

No.	Title	Length
1.	"Las avispas (Versión Privé)"	3:29
2.	"Donde nacen tus Besos"	3:27
3.	"A pedir su mano (Versión Privé)"	3:36
4.	"Pambiche de novia"	2:43
5.	"Ojalá que llueva café (Versión Privé)"	3:49
Total length:		17:04
