= Juan Luis Guerra =

Dominican musician (born 1957)

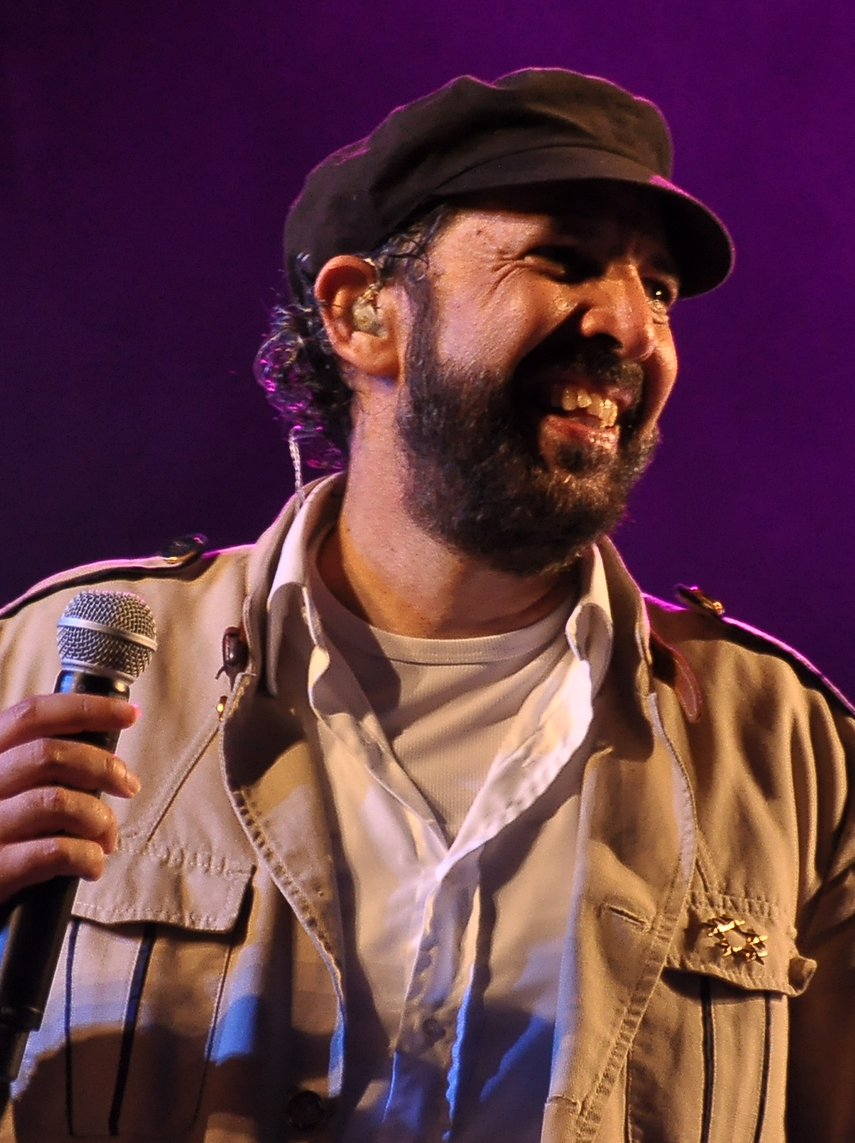
- Guerra in 2012
- Born: Juan Luis Guerra Seijas; 7 June 1957 (age 69); Santo Domingo, Dominican Republic
- Education: Universidad Autónoma de Santo Domingo (Lic.)
- Occupations: Musician; singer; composer; record producer
- Years active: 1983–present
- Spouse: Nora Clementina Altagracia Vega Rasuk (m. 1983)
- Children: Paulina; Jean Gabriel
- Awards: Full list
- Musical career
- Origin: Santo Domingo, Dominican Republic
- Genres: Merengue; bachata; salsa; Latin pop
- Instruments: Vocals; guitar; piano
- Works: Discography
- Labels: Karen; EMI Televisa Music; Venemusic; Capitol Latin; Rimas
- Member of: Juan Luis Guerra y 4.40
- Website: www.juanluisguerra.com (in Spanish)

Juan Luis Guerra Seijas (born 7 June 1957) is a Dominican musician, singer, composer, and record producer. Throughout his career, he has won numerous awards including 31 Latin Grammy Awards, three Grammy Awards, and one Latin Billboard Music Award. He won three Latin Grammy Awards in 2010, including Album of the Year. In 2012, he won the Latin Grammy Award for Producer of the Year. He has sold 15 million records worldwide, making him one of the best-selling Latin music artists.

Guerra is one of the most internationally recognized Latin artists of recent decades. His popular style of merengue and Latin fusion has garnered him considerable success throughout Latin America. He is also credited for popularizing bachata music on a global level and is often associated with the genre, although his distinct style of bachata features a more traditional bolero rhythm and aesthetic mixed with bossa-nova influenced melodies and harmony in some of his songs. He does not limit himself to one style of music, instead, his music incorporates a wide arrange of diverse rhythms such as merengue, bachata, bolero, balada, fusion, salsa, cumbia, mambo, cha-cha-cha, pop, rock and roll, reggae, classical, R&B, folk, blues, jazz, funk, soul, rock, hip-hop/rap, son cubano, and religious, amongst many others. Ojalá Que Llueva Café is one of his most critically acclaimed pieces.

== Early life ==
Born Juan Luis Guerra Seijas, his parents were Gilberto Guerra Pacheco and Olga Seijas Herrero. He has two brothers, José Gilberto, a plastic surgeon, and Diego Esteban, a graduate in business administration. He was a student at La Salle and Santa Teresita school, where he stood out for his love of sports. Before becoming interested in music, Guerra studied Philosophy and Literature at Universidad Autónoma de Santo Domingo. He later studied guitar and music theory at the Dominican Republic's Conservatorio Nacional de Música (National Conservatory of Music) in Santo Domingo, and then decided to go to the United States to attend the Berklee College of Music in Boston, from which he graduated in 1982 with a diploma in jazz composition. He then returned to the Dominican Republic and formed a band with local musicians from his community.

== Career ==
=== 1980s ===
Guerra released his first album, Soplando (1984), with local musicians who became known as Juan Luis Guerra y 440. The number refers to the standard tuning of A440. The band's name in Spanish is Cuatro Cuarenta ("Four Forty"). According to Guerra, this first album was based on jazz tunes and concepts he had learned at Berklee, and it "wasn't intended to be a commercial hit." Subsequently, however, he began to write more merengues.

In 1983, after a performance in front of the Dominican entrepreneur Bienvenido Rodríguez, Juan Luis Guerra was signed to Karen Records. This marked a radical shift in Guerra's musical style toward merengue. In this period, he recorded two albums, Mudanza y Acarreo in 1985 and Mientras Más Lo Pienso...Tú in 1987. These works gained more recognition, and the band was nominated to attend the OTI (Organization of Iberoamerican Television) Festival to represent the Dominican Republic.

In 1988, during the recording of the album Ojalá Que Llueva Café, Guerra became the dominant vocalist of 440. This album also began his international recognition; the album's sales topped the charts in many Latin American countries.

=== 1990s ===
In 1990, 440 released their next album, Bachata Rosa, which became a major hit and earned Guerra his first Grammy award. With sales over five million, the album let Guerra keep touring Latin America, US and Europe. It contains memorable love songs such as "Burbujas de amor" (Bubbles of Love), "Bachata Rosa", "Rosalía", "Como abeja al panal" (Like a Bee to the Honeycomb), "A pedir su mano" (Asking For Her Hand), "Carta de amor" (Love Letter), and "Estrellitas y duendes" (Little stars and elves).

Guerra attracted controversy in 1992 after he released his next album, Areíto (which is a Taíno word for song and dance). It featured the hit single "El costo de la vida", a song that decries corruption in Latin America and the rising costs of living as a consequence. Other songs included in this album protest the poor conditions in many Latin American countries, the celebration of the 'discovery' of the Americas ("1492"), and the double standards of first-world nations. "El costo de la vida" was his first number-one hit in the Hot Latin Tracks.

His next album, Fogaraté (1994) avoided such controversy. It focuses on more rural and lesser known types of Dominican music, like Perico Ripiao.

Guerra's 1998 release Ni es lo mismo ni es igual (Neither The Same Nor Equal) won three Latin Grammys in 2000 for Best Merengue Performance, Best Tropical Song, and Best Engineered Album. Its hits include "Mi PC" (lit. "My PC", My Computer), "Palomita Blanca" (Little White Dove), and "El Niágara en Bicicleta" (The Niagara on Bicycle).

=== 2000s ===
In 2004, Guerra signed a one-off deal with Vene music and released his first new album in six years. Entitled "Para Tí" (For you), the album's songs are mostly Christian, it debuted at number one in US Top Latin Albums and at 110 of US Billboard 200. It was three times certified platinum by the RIAA for selling 300,000 copies and sold half a million copies worldwide. It was certified gold in Argentina and Central America and as platinum in Venezuela. This album won two awards at the 2005 Billboard Music Awards, in the categories of Gospel-Pop and Tropical-Merengue, for the hit single Las Avispas (The wasps), the first time ever that one song has won these two categories at the same time. Other hits included "Para Tí" and "Soldado" (Soldier). In the same ceremony, Guerra was awarded Spirit of Hope Award for his philanthropic work. At the same time, Guerra was honoured with the Latino Special Award for the Music Academy of Spain for his contributions to the music of his country and the Caribbean in the last 20 years. In the same year, Guerra embarked on his 20-year anniversary tour, "Tour 20 años". In the United States, he visited cities including Miami, Chicago, Washington D.C., Orlando, Boston and a concert at New York's Madison Square Garden. In November 2005, Guerra was awarded with two awards at the 6th Annual Latin Grammy Awards for Best Christian Album (Spanish Language) and Best Tropical Song for "Las Avispas".

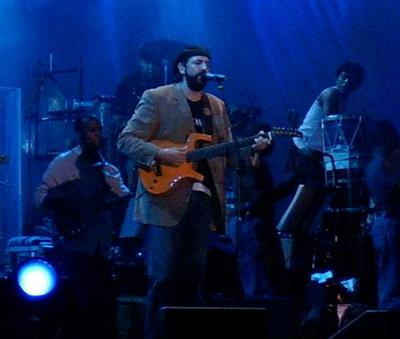
Juan Luis Guerra in concert in Madrid, Spain, during the Para tí tour. July 2005

In January 2006, Guerra performed at Berklee's 60th anniversary, along with other artists such as Paul Simon, Herbie Hancock, Michel Camilo and Chiara Civello. That same year, he recorded with Diego Torres in "Abriendo Caminos" (Opening roads) and with Maná in "Bendita Tu Luz" (Blessed Be Your Light). On 6 April 2006, Guerra was honored as a BMI Icon at the 13th annual BMI Latin Awards. Named BMI's 1995 Latin Songwriter of the Year, Guerra's songwriting has garnered 14 BMI Latin Awards.

Guerra set records for the highest-grossing music tour when he opened for The Rolling Stones' A Bigger Bang Tour at their San Juan, Puerto Rico show in February 2006. He was also invited by Sting to sing with him at a concert at Altos de Chavón, La Romana in the Dominican Republic in 2006.

At the Premio Lo Nuestro awards in 2007, he was given the honorary lifetime achievement award. He also performed the lead single of his new album, "La Llave De Mi Corazón", released in March 2007. Guerra won more than twenty awards with this CD, including five Latin Grammy Awards, six Premios Casandra awards, four billboard Awards, two lo nuestro, and one Grammy Award.

In 2007, Guerra was awarded the Excellence Award at the 2007 Lo Nuestro Awards. Guerra was honoured at the Latin Grammy Awards in the same year with 5 awards, sweeping each category he was nominated in: Record of the Year, Album of the Year, Song of the Year, Best Tropical Song, and Best Merengue Album. Its engineers, Allan Leschhorn, Luis Mansilla, Ronnie Torres, and Adam Ayan, were also awarded Best Engineered Album. The night before the Latin Grammy Awards, he received the academy's Person of the Year Award for his contribution to Latin music and for his philanthropy.

On 10 March 2008, Guerra was honoured with six awards in los Premios Casandra, the most important award event in the Dominican Republic. He won for Orchestrator of the year, Outstanding artist abroad, Music album of the year for "La Llave de mi Corazón" (The Key to My Heart) and "El Soberano" (The Sovereign).

On 16 March 2008, he and other artists participated in the Paz Sin Fronteras concert organised by Juanes, celebrating the end of the 2008 Andean diplomatic crisis between Colombia, Venezuela, and Ecuador.

On 11 April 2008, Guerra was the Billboard Latin awards big winner, with 7 nominations and 3 awards.

On 15 September 2008 Guerra was named a UNESCO Artist for Peace "in recognition of his efforts for the benefit of children with disabilities and children in need."

On 9 May 2009, Guerra was awarded an honorary doctorate from his alma mater, Berklee College of Music at its commencement ceremony.

=== 2010s ===
On 5 April 2010, Guerra released the official video for his new single "Bachata en Fukuoka". The video was filmed in various locations in the city of Los Angeles, and was directed by Colombian director Simon Brand. On 8 June 2010, Guerra released A son de Guerra which contains eight musical rhythms (bachata, merengue, bolero, Mambo, funk, Rock, Jazz, reggae) and includes the collaboration of Juanes among others. The album contains hits including "La Guagua", "La Calle", and "Bachata en Fukuoka". The first single from his new production, "Bachata en Fukuoka", placed in the # 1 position on the Hot Latin Tracks, Tropical Songs, and Latin Pop Airplay Songs of the Billboard charts. Simultaneously, the collaboration of Guerra with Enrique Iglesias on "Cuando me Enamoro" was in the #2 spot on the Rhythm Airplay Chart.

In January 2012, the video for his single "En el cielo no hay Hospital" premiered on YouTube. This song belonged to his new album "Colección Cristiana". Later that year, he collaborated with the Spanish singer Miguel Bosé on his album Papitwo, in the song "Yo creo en Ti".

On 25 April 2014, "Tus Besos" was released. It is a bachata song with a music video inspired by the rock and roll of the 1950s. This video was directed by his son Jean Gabriel.

In 2019 during the Carnival of Santa Cruz de Tenerife in Spain, Juan Luis Guerra surpassed the record reached in 1987 by Celia Cruz by bringing together more than 400,000 people as the largest congregation of people in an open-air plaza to attend a concert. Later that year, he announced his foray into filmmaking as a producer with the development of an animated feature, inspired by his own song Las Avispas.

=== 2020s ===
In 2024, Guerra released Captain Avispa, his first film produced by himself along with Amarilys Germán, directed by Jean Gabriel Guerra and Jonathan Melendez. The film attracted 150,485 viewers to theatres.

== Singing in other languages ==
Guerra has recorded several songs in English, like "July 19th" on his 1994 album Fogaraté, and more recently "Medicine for My Soul" and "Something Good" with Italian singer Chiara Civello. Some of his songs have verses in both English and Spanish such as "Woman del Callao", "Guavaberry", "Señorita" on his 1995 compilation album Grandes Exitos as a bonus track and more recently "La Llave de Mi Corazón". The album Areíto featured two songs, the cover-title song "Areíto" and "Naboria daca, mayanimacaná", which are sung in the Arawak language of the extinct Taino natives of Hispaniola. Juan Luis Guerra also recorded the album "Bachata Rosa" in Portuguese. He uses Japanese words in Bachata en Fukuoka (Bachata in Fukuoka), 2010 Latin Grammy winner for Best Tropical Song.

== As a composer for other artists ==
In 1988, he made his debut as a songwriter for other artists such as Taty Salas, for whom he wrote "De tu boca", a song with which they represented the Dominican Republic in the OTI Festival 1988, placing third. In 1989, he wrote for Maridalia Hernández the song "Te ofrezco", with which they represented the Dominican Republic in the OTI Festival 1989, placing third again. He also composed songs for Mexican artists like Emmanuel ("No he podido verte", recorded in 1990) and Luis Miguel ("Hasta que me olvides" 1993 and "Te necesito" 2003). He also composed for the Puerto Rican salsa singer Gilberto Santa Rosa ("Te Propongo" 1994).

== Lyrical style ==
Being a native Dominican, his music is heavily influenced by native Caribbean rhythms, such as merengue and bachata.

His lyrics are often charged with intentionally simple, heavily metaphorical, or popular expressions, such as "Burbujas de Amor" (Bubbles of Love). His lyrics also reflect in political issues, but from a deeply human perspective, that is, centering the lyrics in the human drama that social injustice generates. This is seen in "Visa Para un Sueño" about the broken dream of a visit to America. "El Niágara en Bicicleta" — a title based on the Cuban idiom, "al pasar el Niagara en bicicleta", meaning a difficult task — describes the negligence that destroys the social health services. "El Costo de La Vida" describes the effects of globalization and government corruption on the working-class people; "Acompáñeme Civil" ("Accompany me Civilian") is about police and military corruption that exploits the people that they should care for.

== Discography ==
- Soplando (1984)
- Mudanza y Acarreo (1985)
- Mientras Más Lo Pienso...Tú (1987)
- Ojalá Que Llueva Café (1989)
- Bachata Rosa (1990)
- Areíto (1992)
- Fogaraté (1994)
- Ni es lo mismo ni es igual (1998)
- Para Ti (2004)
- La Llave de Mi Corazón (2007)
- A Son de Guerra (2010)
- Colección Cristiana (2012)
- Todo Tiene Su Hora (2014)
- Literal (2019)
- Privé (2020)
- Radio Güira (2023)

== Tours ==
- Ojala Que Llueva Cafe Tour (1990–91)
- Bachata Rosa World Tour (1991–92)
- Areito World Tour (1993)
- El Niagara en Bicicleta Tour (2000)
- Tour 20 años (2004–06)
- La Travesia Tour (2008–09)
- A Son de Guerra World Tour (2011–13)
- Todo Tiene Su Hora Tour (2015–17)
- Literal Tour Grandes Éxitos (2019)
- Entre Mar y Palmeras Tour (2022-26)

== 440 band members ==
- Janina Rosado
- Roger Zayas-Bazán
- Maridalia Hernández
- Mariela Mercado
- Marco Hernández (replaced Maridalia Hernández)
- Adalgisa Pantaleón (replaced Mariela Mercado)
- Quico Rizek (replaced Marco Hernández)

== Personal life ==
Guerra is the son of Gilberto Guerra Pacheco and Olga Seijas Herrero; he has two brothers, José Gilberto Guerra Seijas, plastic surgeon, and Diego Esteban Guerra Seijas, economist. He is married to Nora Clementina Altagracia Vega Rasuk, and has two children. His wife is the aunt of Miss Universe 2003 Amelia Vega Polanco.

In 2000, he became an evangelical Christian and worship director at the "Más Que Vencedores" church in Santo Domingo.

On 17 October 2008, he participated as a Goodwill Ambassador for UNESCO in an event called "Levántate y Actúa contra la Pobreza y por los Objetivos de Desarrollo del Milenio", in Bavaro, Dominican Republic, during the International Conference of the Americas.

On 18 April 2010, he organized a concert to raise money for those who were affected by the 2010 Haiti earthquake. After this successful event was held, a children's hospital was later built in Haiti.

== See also ==
- List of best-selling Latin music artists

== Bibliography ==
- Manuel, Peter (1995). Caribbean Currents: Caribbean Music from Rumba to Reggae. Temple University Press. ISBN 9781566393393.
- Hutchinson, Sydney. "Guerra, Juan Luis." Grove Dictionary of American Music, 2nd ed., 2013.
- Larrazábal Blanco, Carlos. Familias Dominicanas (in Spanish). Santo Domingo: Academia Dominicana de la Historia.
