= Lacrimosa (disambiguation) =

Lacrimosa is part of the Dies Irae sequence in the Roman Catholic Requiem Mass.

Lacrimosa or Lacrymosa is the Latin for weeping, and may also refer to:

== Classical music ==
- Lacrimosa, part of the Dies Irae sequence in the Roman Catholic Requiem Mass
  - Lacrimosa, a movement from Grande Messe des morts (or Requiem) by Hector Berlioz
  - Lacrimosa, a movement from Requiem in B♭ minor by Antonín Dvořák
  - Lacrimosa, a movement from Requiem in D minor by Wolfgang Amadeus Mozart
  - Lacrimosa, a movement from Messa da Requiem by Giuseppe Verdi

== Popular music ==
- Lacrimosa (band), a gothic rock/metal musical duo
- "Lacrymosa" (song), by Evanescence from the album The Open Door, 2006
- Lacrimosa (Juan Luis Guerra song)
- "Lacrimosa" (Kalafina song), from the album Red Moon
- "Lacrimosa", a song by Immediate Music from the album Themes for Orchestra and Choir
- "Lacrymosa", a song by Libera from the album Peace
- "Lacrimosa", a song by the Melvins from the album Stag
- "Lacrimosa", a song by Regina Spektor from the album Songs
- "Lacrimosa", a song by Sweetbox from the album Adagio
- "Lacrimosa", a song by Symbion Project from the album Immortal Game
- "Lacrimosa", a song by Symphony X from the album V: The New Mythology Suite
- "Lacrimosa", a song by Tech N9ne from the album Special Effects
- "Lacrimosa", a song by Ufomammut from the album Snailking
- "Lacrimosa", a part of "Requiem" by Welsh composer Karl Jenkins
- "Lacrimosa", a part of "Requiem for My Friend" by Zbigniew Preisner
- "Lacrimosa", a song by Tribulation from the album Down Below
- "Lacrimosa", a song by Apashe from the album Requiem
- "Lacrimosa", a song by Mushroomhead from the album A Wonderful Life
- "Lacrimosa", a song by Gaspard Augé from the album Escapades

== Other uses ==
- Our Lady of Sorrows, a title given to Mary, mother of Jesus.
- 208 Lacrimosa, a main belt asteroid
- "Lacrimosa", a character in Terry Pratchett's "Discworld" series
- Ys VIII: Lacrimosa of Dana
- "Lacrimosa," or "L. Lacrimosa," the author
