= Elgar Violin Concerto discography =

Edward Elgar's Violin Concerto was first recorded complete in 1929. Truncated versions had been recorded in 1916 using the acoustic recording process, the technical limitations of which necessitated drastic rearrangement of the score. Electrical recording, introduced in the 1920s, gave a greatly improved dynamic range and realism, and the two leading English record companies, Columbia and His Master's Voice both made recordings of the concerto that remain in the catalogue. The first was made for Columbia by Albert Sammons with the New Queen's Hall Orchestra conducted by Sir Henry Wood. Elgar's own recording with the young Yehudi Menuhin followed three years later. Since then there have been more than twenty-five further recordings, featuring British and international performers.

== Recordings by date ==
Soloist	Orchestra	Conductor	Label	Date
Albert Sammons	unnamed	Sir Henry Wood	Columbia	1916
Marie Hall	unnamed	Sir Edward Elgar	His Master's Voice	1916
Albert Sammons	New Queen's Hall Orchestra	Sir Henry Wood	Columbia	1929
Yehudi Menuhin	London Symphony Orchestra	Sir Edward Elgar	His Master's Voice	1932
Jascha Heifetz	London Symphony Orchestra	Sir Malcolm Sargent	His Master's Voice	1949
Alfredo Campoli	London Philharmonic Orchestra	Sir Adrian Boult	Decca	1954
Yehudi Menuhin	New Philharmonia Orchestra	Sir Adrian Boult	EMI	1966
Aldo Ferraresi	Orchestra Sinfonica RAI Milano	Pietro Argento	Rhine Classics	1966
Gidon Kremer	Belgian National Orchestra	René Defossez	Discothèque Nationale de Belgique	1967
Yehudi Menuhin	London Philharmonic Orchestra	Sir Adrian Boult	BBC	1969
Hugh Bean	Royal Liverpool Philharmonic Orchestra	Charles Groves	EMI	1972
Pinchas Zukerman	London Philharmonic Orchestra	Daniel Barenboim	CBS	1976
Kyung-Wha Chung	London Philharmonic Orchestra	Sir Georg Solti	Decca	1977
Ida Haendel	London Philharmonic Orchestra	Sir Adrian Boult	EMI	1978
Itzhak Perlman	Chicago Symphony Orchestra	Daniel Barenboim	DG	1981
Igor Oistrakh	Moscow State Symphony Orchestra	Valentin Zhuk	Olympia	1984
Nigel Kennedy	London Philharmonic Orchestra	Vernon Handley	EMI	1984
Ida Haendel	BBC Symphony Orchestra	Sir John Pritchard	BBC	1986
Dmitry Sitkovetsky	Royal Philharmonic Orchestra	Sir Yehudi Menuhin	Virgin	1990
Dong-Suk Kang	Polish National Radio Symphony Orchestra	Adrian Leaper	Naxos	1991
Salvatore Accardo	London Symphony Orchestra	Richard Hickox	Collins Classics	1991
Pinchas Zukerman	St. Louis Symphony Orchestra	Leonard Slatkin	RCA	1992
Kyoko Takezawa	Bavarian Radio Symphony Orchestra	Sir Colin Davis	RCA	1993
Leland Chen	Arnhem Philharmonic Orchestra	Lord Menuhin	Upbeat	1994
Nigel Kennedy	City of Birmingham Symphony Orchestra	Sir Simon Rattle	EMI	1997
Ilya Grubert	Moscow Symphony Orchestra	Vladimir Ziva	Vista Vera	2003
Hilary Hahn	London Symphony Orchestra	Sir Colin Davis	DG	2004
Philippe Graffin	Royal Liverpool Philharmonic Orchestra	Vernon Handley	Avie	2006
James Ehnes	Philharmonia Orchestra	Sir Andrew Davis	Onyx	2007
Gil Shaham	Chicago Symphony Orchestra	David Zinman	Canary	2008
Nikolaj Znaider	Dresden Staatskapelle	Sir Colin Davis	RCA	2010
Thomas Zehetmair	Hallé Orchestra	Sir Mark Elder	Hallé	2010
Tasmin Little	Royal Scottish National Orchestra	Sir Andrew Davis	Chandos	2010
Marat Bisengaliev	West Kazakhstan Philharmonic Orchestra	Bundit Ungrangsee	Naxos	2011
Catherine Manoukian	Staatskapelle Weimar	Stefan Solyom	Edel	2013
Rachel Barton Pine	BBC Symphony Orchestra	Andrew Litton	Avie	2018
Ning Feng	Royal Liverpool Philharmonic Orchestra	Carlos Miguel Prieto	Channel Classics Records	2018
Thomas Albertus Irnberger	Royal Philharmonic Orchestra	James Judd	Gramola	2019
Alda Dizdari	Musica Viva Orchestra	Alexander Walker	Mellos Records	2020
Nicola Benedetti	London Philharmonic Orchestra	Vladimir Jurowski	Decca	2020
Triin Ruubel	Estonian National Symphony Orchestra	Neeme Järvi	Sorel Classics	2020
Renaud Capuçon	London Symphony Orchestra	Sir Simon Rattle	Erato, Warner Classics	2021
Michael Barenboim	Philharmonia Orchestra	Alessandro Crudele	Linn Records	2023
Vilde Frang	Deutsches Symphonie-Orchester Berlin	Robin Ticciati	Warner Classics	2024
Nicolas Dautricourt	BBC National Orchestra of Wales	Frédéric Chaslin	Channel Classics Records	2025
Christian Tetzlaff	BBC Philharmonic Orchestra	John Storgårds	Ondine	2025

== Critical opinion ==
The BBC Radio 3 feature "Building a Library" has presented comparative reviews of all available versions of the concerto on three occasions, and recommended as follows:

- 15 October 1994, reviewer, Michael Kennedy:
  - Kyoko Takezawa, Bavarian Radio Symphony Orchestra, Sir Colin Davis
  - Yehudi Menuhin, London Symphony Orchestra, Sir Edward Elgar
- 10 July 1999, reviewer, Iain Burnside:
  - Albert Sammons, New Queen's Hall Orchestra, Sir Henry Wood
  - Pinchas Zukerman, London Philharmonic Orchestra, Daniel Barenboim
- 14 January 2012, reviewer, Martin Cotton:
  - Yehudi Menuhin, London Symphony Orchestra, Sir Edward Elgar
  - Thomas Zehetmair, Hallé Orchestra, Sir Mark Elder

The Penguin Guide to Recorded Classical Music, 2008, gave its maximum four star rating to none of the recordings of the concerto. It awarded three stars (representing "an outstanding performance and recording") to the recordings by Graffin, Heifetz, Kang, Kennedy (1984 and 1997), Menuhin (1932 and 1966), and Sammons (1929).
