= Viviré (song) =

1994 song by Juan Luis Guerra

Single by Juan Luis Guerra

from the album Fogaraté
- B-side: "Canto de Hacha"
- Released: 1994
- Genre: Bachata
- Length: 4:00
- Label: Karen
- Songwriters: Juan Luis Guerra; Papa Wemba
- Producer: Juan Luis Guerra

Juan Luis Guerra singles chronology
"La Cosquillita" (1994)	"Viviré" (1994)	"El Beso de la Ciguatera" (1994)

"Viviré" ("I Will Live") is a song by Dominican Republic singer-songwriter Juan Luis Guerra released as the second single for his album Fogaraté (1994). It is a Spanish-language adaptation of "Vivi" by Congolese musician Papa Wemba with Guerra writing the song in Spanish. It became his first song to reach number-one on the Billboard Latin Pop Airplay in 1994. At the 1995 Latin Billboard Music Awards, "Viviré" won Tropical/Salsa Song of the Year. It was recognized as one best-performing Latin songs of the year at the 1996 BMI Latin Awards. The music video for the song was directed by Gustavo Garzón and received a nomination for Video of the Year at the 1995 Lo Nuestro Awards. On the review of the album for the Miami Herald, Fernando Gonzalez called the song "the best of the lot". A writer for Music & Media described the track as a Cuban son.

== Track listing ==
1. "Viviré" - 4:00
2. "Canto de Hacha"

== Charts ==
Chart (1994)	Peak position
US Hot Latin Songs (Billboard)	5
US Latin Pop Airplay (Billboard)	1

== See also ==
- List of number-one Billboard Latin Pop Airplay songs of 1994
