= Fogaraté =

Fogaraté!

Studio album by Juan Luis Guerra
- Released: July 19, 1994
- Recorded: 1993–94; 440 Studio; (New York, New York)
- Genres: Merengue, bachata
- Length: 46:06
- Label: KAREN Records

Juan Luis Guerra chronology
| Areito (1992) | Fogaraté! (1994) | Grandes Éxitos Juan Luis Guerra y 440 (1995) |

Singles from Fogaraté!
- 1. "La Cosquillita" Released: June 21, 1994; 2. "Viviré" Released: May 30, 1994; 3. "El Beso de la Ciguatera" Released: January 23, 1995

Fogaraté! is the seventh album of the famous Dominican songwriter and musician Juan Luis Guerra. It was released on July 19, 1994. The album mixed a variety of music genres including rural and folkloric roots of merengue called "Perico Ripia'o" with elements of African soukus music and Tropical Music such as Reggae with the collaboration of African guitarist Diblo Dibala and Dominican accordionist Francisco Ulloa, along with Son, Bachata and Salsa. Also, the album features a particular, bachata-styled adaptation of the Lacrimosa movement from Mozart's Requiem Mass in D Minor and Guerra's first song fully in English "July 19". Exploring lyrics and themes about magical realism of Latin American literature and commenting on the politics of the Caribbean, for many fans and critics, Fogaraté! is one of his most musically complex album.

The album received widespread critical acclaim, with some music critics citing it as one of the best albums of 1994. Fogaraté! was nominated for Best Tropical Latin Album at the 37th Annual Grammy Awards and for a Lo Nuestro Award for Tropical Album of the Year at the 7th Lo Nuestro Awards. Also, Juan Luis Guerra won songwriter of the year at the 1995's BMI Latin Awards The album was supported by three official singles Vivire, La Cosquillita and El Beso de la Ciguatera were awarded as well. Also, two promotional singles were released: Los Pajaritos and Lacrimosa. Eventually, Fogaraté! won Tropical/salsa album of the year, duo or group at the 1995 Latin Billboard Music Awards.

Fogaraté! peaked for five consecutive weeks at the top of charts in Spain and debuted at the top five of US Billboard Top Latin Albums and Tropical Albums. It reached the Top ten in Chile and Puerto Rico and top twenty in Netherlands and Portugal. Despite this, the commercial response for the album was moderate to limited in comparison to his blockbuster album Bachata Rosa (1990) and the million-sellers Areito (1992) and Ojala que llueva Cafe (1989). To promote the record, Guerra embarked some farewell concerts before taking a four-year hiatus due personal issues such as stress, pressure and sleeping problems which caused his conversion to Christianity. He came back with Ni es lo Mismo Ni Es Igual in 1998.

== Background ==
As of July 1994, Guerra sold over eight million of copies worldwide of his past studio albums. In 1989, Guerra become an international sensation with the release of his studio album Ojala que llueva Cafe. The titled track, was inspired on a poem of the poor work conditions of the rural zones. His next album, Bachata Rosa, that contains elements of jaz, Cuban Son and Rock sold over 5 millions of units worldwide and won the grammy for Best Tropical Album. In 1992, "Areito" (named for the social gatherings of the Dominican Republic's pre-Colombuian Tainios tribe) further strengthened his reputations as the "Tropical Mixmaster" incorporation elements of merengue with Haitian compas, Zairean soukous and bachata to make powerful statements about economic inequality in the Caribbean. Following of the end of the Areito World Tour, Guerra started to record a new album at New York. Accordionist, Francisco Ulloa and his band traveled from Santiago de los caballeros to help and collaborate with the record the album. With the release of the lead single "La Cosquillita", Guerra wanted to made clear his Perico ripia'o (rural merengue) approach on his album. The colorful and energetic cover was done by Roy Lichtenstein, a first for the Latin music industry.

== Recording, music style and title ==
=== Recording ===
The recording sessions of Fogarate were longer than his previous albums, Bachata Rosa and Areito, taking almost a year to complete. The album's musical structure, featured the Dominican merengue band of Francisco Ulloa that help to record interpretations of accordion-based típico merengue while exploring elements of African and Caribbean rhythms with the collaboration of guitarist Diablo Diabla. The album was recorded at 440 studios in New York.

=== Music style ===
John Storm Roberts by AllMusic, called the result as "soukous-influenced merengue". Fogarate! mixes a variety of music (merengue, salsa, bachata, perico ripia'o, African soukous with lyrics influenced by the magical realism of Latin American literature and commenting on the politics of the Caribbean. The result of the combination of the works of Diablo Dibala and Francisco Ulloa demonstrate the two-way influence between Afro-pop and Afro-Caribbean music. The tracks "El Farolito", "La Cosquillita" and "El Canto de la Hacha" were recording with the collaboration of Francisco Ulloa and his band. Those tracks are based on rural merengue, Perico Ripia'o. While, the guitarist Diblo Dibala along with this band Matchatcha, collaborated with the tracks "Fogarate", "Los Mangos Bajitos" and "El Beso de la Ciguatera". On the track "Los Parajitos" and "Oprobio" Guerra explored the Cuban son and Vivire the Dominican Bachata. "Oficio de Enamorado" is a smooth salsa and on the following track on the tracklist, "La Lacrimosa" attempts an interpretation of Mozart's Requiem with bachata. The album also contained Guerra first English language track "July 19th".

=== Title ===
"Fogarate" is the Dominican word for the plant Mucuna pruriens, whose dust causes an intense itching on contact with the skin. But the word has a double meaning: in the Dominican Republic it is said that a person has "fogaraté" when he is very "on", or if he is very "alive". A woman who has "fogaraté" is that she is turned on in terms of sensuality.

== Writing and composition ==
The album consists of twelve tracks. The first track, "Los Mangos Bajitos" is the only track on the record that contains social content. The lyrics is an adaptation of a decimero from a famous Dominican (Juan Antonio Alix) written 1904 about political corruption and violence with Congolese Diblo Dibala performing on guitar. The song is a mix the merengue and soukus. "El Farolito" compare the silhouette of a woman with a lantern. According to Guerra, the song is "his personal version of "perico ripia'o" with brass, synthesizer and a guitar strummed reggae style. Los Pajaritos is a love story between two little birds to the rhythm of Cuban son. Vivire, is a ballad written by African composer Papa Wemba. El Beso de la Ciguaterra is another merengue-soukus. According to the artist: "Ciguatera is a disease caught by eating fish infected with poisonous algae, but here is a kiss that transmit it". "Oficio De Enamorado" is a romantic salsa and as for the arrangements, very sophisticated and influenced by Joe Cuba.

"Lacrimosa" Bachata inspired by the 'Lacrimosa' from Mozart's 'Requiem'. The tile track, "Fogarate", compare the energy of a brown skin women with the flower of the same name. Also, with music by Dibala and in which his guitar performance. "Canto De Hacha" with the collaboration of Francisco Ulloa is pure folk theme, without sophistications. "Oprobio" created in the 1920s or 1930s by Puerto Rican Rafael Hernández, is one of Guerra my favorite son. It has a very hurtful lyrics that the artist softened. "July 19th" is Guerra first English song. A bachata reminiscent of the Beatles, but some caribbean influence. "La Cosquillita" is another Perico Ripia'o made with the collaboration of Francisco Ulloa and his band but written and composed of Juan Luis Guerra. According to the Guerra, is a "frenetic rhythm to dance".

== Critical reception ==
Professional ratings
Review scores
| Source | Rating |
|---|---|
| Allmusic | 3.5/5 stars |
| Cashbox | (favorable) |
| Billboard | (Positive) |
| The Gazette | (Positive) |

Fogarate receive positive reviews by the critics. John Storm Roberts from Allmusic gave the album 3.5 out 5 stars. Tomothy White at the section "Music to my ears" from Billboard, gave a positive review to the album and stated "with "Fogaraté," Guerra seems likely to complete his steady progression from native phenomenon to Latino sensation to singular international performer" and named the album his most impressive work yet. On December 30, 1994, Phillip Sweeney from The Independent included Forgarate on the artiticle titled "All around the world; BEST global albums". At the end of the year, Johnn Lanert of the Caribbean Latin division of the same magazine, ranked 3 at the Top 10 year list of best albums of 1994. It was ranked at 2 on El Pais list Best Albums of 1994. In 2008, Fogarate! was included on the book 1,000 Recordings to Hear Before You Die by Tom Moon. On the review the author highlights the tracks "La Cosquillita" and "Oficio de Enamorado".

Edumunto Barreiros and Lela Blanco from Jornal do Brasil, rated the album as excellent. On other hand, Rick Mitchell from Houston Chronicle praised the album and wrote "Guerra has done for Dominican merengue what Bob Marley for Reggae". Also, choice the album on musical memories of '94. Eventually, Forgarate was nominated for Best Tropical Latin Album at the 37th Annual Grammy Awards and for a Lo Nuestro Award for Tropical Album of the Year at the 7th Lo Nuestro Awards.

Cashbox included the album on their pick of the week on the issue of October 22, 1994. The article stated, "One of these is Guerra's use of the "Perico Ripia'o," a very fast rhythm. Guerra has cleverly placed this "Bionic Merengue" within clear earshot of all. It has served in making his style as truly unique as the album's artwork." Daniel Feist from the Canadian newspaper The Gazette praised the album production and wrote "Fogarate is all the proof you need that today Guerra is the Dominican Republic's most exciting and innovative star". Mark Houston from Miami-based journal Hispanic referenced the album and stated "No matter the language, Fogarate! stands as an album of timeless qualities deserving of a wide international audience".

Raid Cairo from Music&Media, ranked Fogarate at 3 on the Top 10 Best Albums of 1994. Timothy White, editor in chief on Billboard, ranked Foragate! at 7th on his Top 10 Best Album of 1994 list. Also, Neil Strauss from The New York Times ranked on his Top 10 of Best Albums of 1994. The Asociacion Cronistas del Espectaculo (ACE), a group of journalists specialized in the activities of Hispanic entertainment in New York, honored Fogarate! Best Tropical Album by a Male Artist of 1994. In 2023, the album was included on the 100 Essential Albums of Dominican Music List by Acroarte.

=== Year-end rankings ===
Selected year-end rankings of Fogaraté!
| Publication | List | Rank | Ref. |
|---|---|---|---|
| Billboard | Johnn Lanert`s Top 10 Best Albums of 1994 | 3 | |
| Billboard | Timothy White`s Top 10 Best Albums of 1994 | 7 | |
| El Pais | Best Albums of 1994 | 2 | |
| Music & Media | Raid Cario`s Top 10 Best Albums of 1994 | 3 | |
| The New York Times | Neil Strauss`s Top 10 Best Albums of 1994 | 7 | |

== Commercial performance ==
=== Album ===
Initial shipments of Fogaraté include 70,000 units in Spain and 10,000 in Holland. A Japanese was released on September of that Year. The album was a commercial success in Europe. It peaked in the top 20 in Portugal and Netherlands. In Spain, it debuted at number one on the Spanish album charts and stayed there for five consecutive weeks and was certified platinum. Also, it was the 15th best-selling album of 1994 in Spain and the 8th best-selling album by a foreign artist of 1994.

In the United States, Forgarate debuted and peaked in the top 5 of the US Billboard Top Latin Album and Tropical Album charts selling over 200,000 copies in the first four months. Also, the album won Tropical/Salsa Album of the Year by Duo or Group and the single "Vivire" the Tropical/Salsa Song of the Year at the 2nd Latin Billboard Music Awards. It was the 4th best-selling tropical album in the United States of 1994 and the 29th best-selling Latin album overall. The album success in Central America surpassed all projections set by the label at the time.

Sales figures for Fogarate were good in comparison to most tropical artists at the time. However, album sales were lower than his previous work Areito (1992) and a commercial disappointment in comparison to Bachata Rosa from 1990. Many attributed this to the album structure which was mostly based on the traditional "perico ripia'o", the more danceable prototype of the "merengue", which was not popular outside of the Dominican Republic and some fans were unfamiliar with Dominican culture at the time. This situation along with the controversy around his predecessor and Guerra's refusal not to repeat the commercial formula of mix rhythms used in Bachata Rosa, led to a popularity decline in some countries.

=== Singles ===
The album's lead single, "La Cosquillita" reached number one in Spain and the top 10 of the US Billboard Top Latin Songs and Tropical Songs charts. Also, it peaked at number 7 on the New York Top 25 airplay, 3 on the Miami Top 25 and on the Puerto Rico Top 25 according to Cashbox. Also it peaked at number one in Dominican Republic and 10 in Venezuela. The second single Vivire, peaked at number five at US Billboard Hot Latin Songs and number one US Latin Pop Airplay. The third single "El Beso de la Ciguatera", reached the top ten on the Billboard Hot Latin Songs and Tropical Airplay charts in the United States. It also received moderate airplay in Europe peaking at the Top 20.

Due to the album musical structure, songs like "La Cosquillita" and "El Farolito" get recurrent airplay and streams in the Dominican Republic. " "El Farolito" also peaked at number one on the Dominican Airplay. Two promotional single were released in 1995: Lacrimosa and Los Pajaritos, which peaked at the US Cashbox Top 20 and Top 10 of US Contemporary Pop and Tropical Airplay respectively.

=== Tour ===
To promote the album, Juan Luis Guerra did some personal appearances and shows. In 1995, he played just two sold out farewell concerts before taking a four-year break from music. The first one was on June 10, 1995, at the Estadio Olimpico, Santo Domingo. The concert was sold out with attendance of 50,000 fans and grossing over US$455,000. A record at the time, however due the huge amount of fans entering at the stadium, 104 people were injured. However, the production of the concert won "Show of the Year" at the 1995's Soberano Awards. The second was on June 17, 1995, at the Hiram Bithorn Stadium in San Juan, Puerto Rico with attendance of 25,000 and grossing over US$750,000.

== Track listing ==
All tracks are written by Juan Luis Guerra.

| No. | Title | Length |
|---|---|---|
| 1. | "Los Mangos Bajitos" | 3:55 |
| 2. | "El Farolito" | 3:42 |
| 3. | "Los Pajaritos" | 4:02 |
| 4. | "Viviré" | 4:00 |
| 5. | "El Beso de la Ciguatera" | 4:08 |
| 6. | "Oficio de Enamorado" | 4:52 |
| 7. | "Lacrimosa" | 3:20 |
| 8. | "Fogaraté" | 3:40 |
| 9. | "Canto de Hacha" | 3:53 |
| 10. | "Oprobio" | 2:48 |
| 11. | "July 19" | 4:06 |
| 12. | "La Cosquillita" | 3:40 |
| Total length: | | 46:06 |

== Personnel ==
The following credits are from AllMusic and from the Fogarate! liner notes:

Juan Luis Guerra y 440

- Juan Luis Guerra – vocals, guitar
- Daniel Pena – saxophone
- Roberto Olea – trombone
- Elvis Cabrera – piano, synthesizer
- Marco Hernandez – synthesizer
- Osvaldo Cesa – bass
- Roger Zayas – drums
- Johnny Chocolate – Tamboura
- Pedro Peralta – congas
- Rafael Guzman – güira
- Isidro Bobadilla – percussion
- Adalgisa Pantaleon – vocals
- Yaninna Rosado – Piano

Additional personnel

- Juan Antonio Alix – Composer
- Jose Belliard – Bajo Sexto
- Juan Colon – Saxophone
- Jose Antonio Cruz – Guira
- Victor Cruz – Coro
- Marti Cuevas – Saxophone
- Barry Danielian – Trumpet
- Juan De La Cruz – Bongos, Tamboura, Timbales
- Juan Alberto Diaz – Saxophone
- Diblo Dibala – Composer, Guitar
- Rafael "Rafo" German – Guira
- Jorge Gonzalez – Bongos, Cencerro, Maracas
- Oscar Hernandez – Piano
- Rafael Hernández – Composer
- José Jerez – Trumpet
- Lewis Kahn – Trombone
- Kaitilin Mahony – French Horn
- Ray Martinez – Bajo Sexto
- Eddie Montalvo – Congas
- Arturo Ortiz – Synthesizer
- Pedro Tene – Peralta Congas
- Fabian Perez – Saxophone
- Mario Rivera – Baritone, Flute
- David "Piro" Rodríguez – Trumpet
- Hector Santana – Bajo Sexto
- Manuel Tejada – Programming
- Francisco Ulloa – Accordion, Composer, Vocals
- Jose R. Vallejo – Tamboura
- Angel Vazquez – Trombone
- Michael Vinas – Bajo Sexto
- Papa Wemba – Composer

== Charts ==
Weekly chart performance for Fogarate
| Chart (1994) | Peak position |
|---|---|
| Chilean Albums (AFP) | 9 |
| European Albums (Top 100) | 24 |
| Netherlands (Mega Album Top 100) | 18 |
| Spanish Albums (PROMUSICAE) | 1 |
| Portuguese Albums (AFP) | 19 |
| Puerto Rican Albums (Cashbox) | 10 |
| US Top Latin Albums (Billboard) | 3 |
| US Tropical Albums (Billboard) | 2 |
| Chart (2015) | Peak Position |
| Venezuelan Albums (Recordland) | 34 |

=== Year-end charts ===
Year-end chart performance for Fogarate
| Chart (1994) | Rank |
|---|---|
| Spanish Albums (AFYVE) | 15 |
| US Tropical Albums (Billboard) | 4 |

== Certifications and sales ==
| Region | Certification | Certified units/sales |
|---|---|---|
| Spain (Promusicae) | Platinum | 100,000^{^} |
| United States | — | 200,000 |
^{^} Shipments figures based on certification alone.
