= In These Stones Horizons Sing =

Choral work by Karl Jenkins

In These Stones Horizons Sing is a work for baritone, chorus, and orchestra composed by Karl Jenkins. It was commissioned for the opening of Wales Millennium Centre and first performed at its opening in November 2004. The work includes text in both English and Welsh written by Menna Elfyn, Grahame Davies, and Gwyneth Lewis.

== Structure ==
The work is divided into four short movements; the first movement is further divided into two parts. A typical performance takes 10–15 minutes. The movements are:

- "Agorawd
  - Part I: Cân yr Alltud"
  - Part II: Nawr!"
- "Grey"
- "Eleni Ganed"
- "In These Stones Horizons Sing"

== Recordings ==
The work is included on the compact disc Requiem, which also features Karl Jenkins' Requiem. The performance is by the West Kazakhstan Philharmonic Orchestra, conducted by Jenkins himself, with Bryn Terfel as soloist. The recording was released on EMI.
