= El Farolito (song) =

Song by Juan Luis Guerra

from the album Fogaraté
- Recorded: 1994
- Studio: 440 Studio; (New York City)
- Genre: Merengue típico
- Length: 3:42
- Label: Karen Records
- Composers: Juan Luis Guerra, Francisco Ulloa

"El Farolito" (The Little Lantern) is a song recorded by Dominican singer Juan Luis Guerra for his seventh studio album, Fogaraté (1994), included as its eighth track. It was composed and produced by Guerra and the Dominican accordionist Francisco Ulloa and his band. The track is a Perico Ripiao, better known as merengue tipico, a rural version of merengue and it describes the curves of the body of a lover and his feelings for her. According Guerra, "El Farolito" is his favorite track on the album. The track was received well by the critics and according to some is "a kind of higher-class version of merengue típico".

Due the musical structure of the song, along with "La Cosquillita", it is one of the favorite tracks among Guerra's Dominican fan base, eventually peaking at number one on the Dominican charts, becoming his second chart-topping song in the country, following "La Cosquillita". The track was performed at the 1996 and 2011 Soberano Awards ceremony. The track was included on the live album Entre Mar y Palmeras (2021). Following the release of the album, the song was performed at the 22nd Annual Latin Grammy Awards ceremony.

== Charts ==
Chart (1994)	Peak position
Dominican Republic (UPI)	1
