= List of awards and nominations received by Tito Puente =

Tito Puente awards and nominations
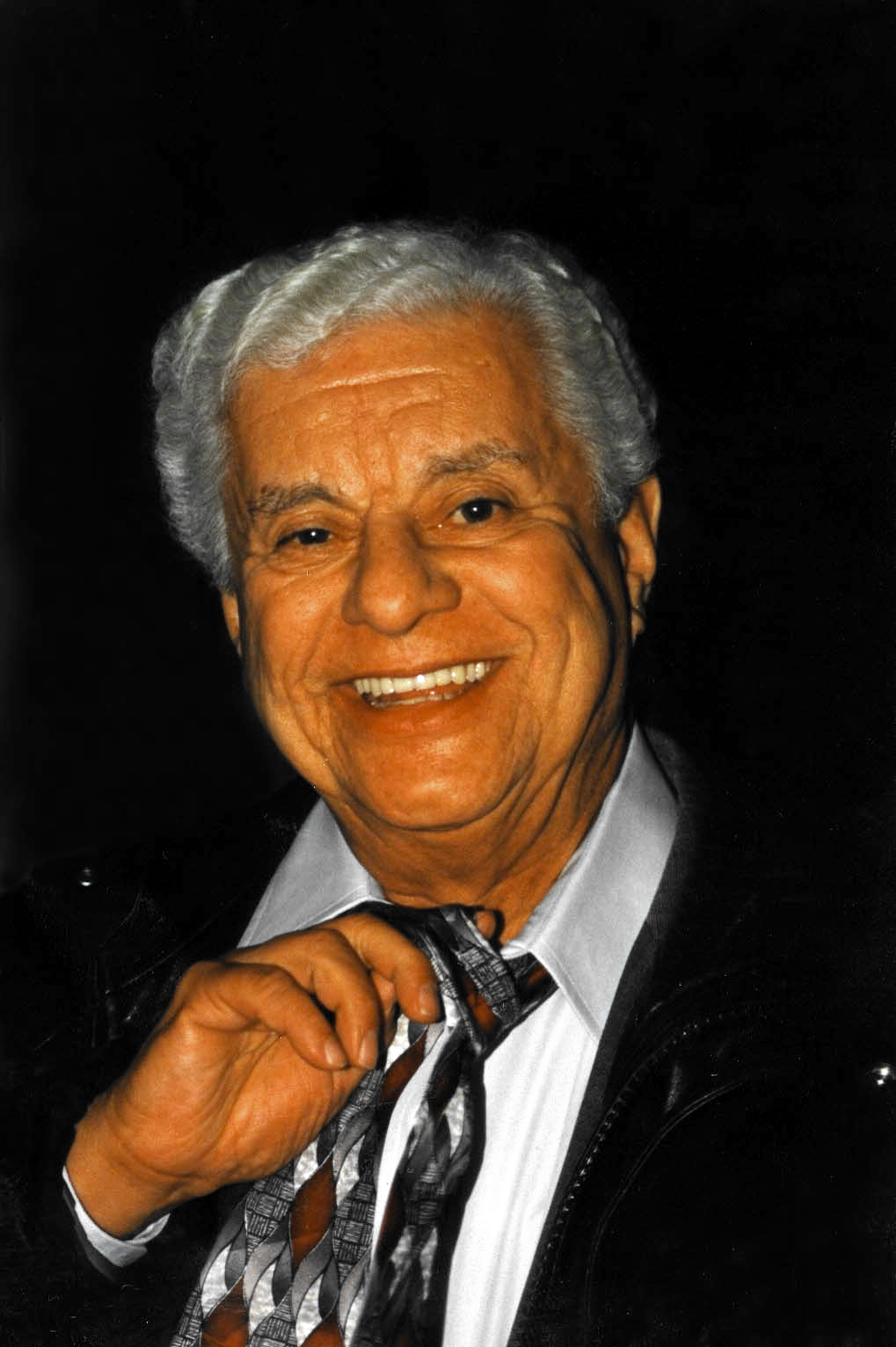
- Tito Puente at the Kennedy Center in 1996
Awards and nominations
Award	Wins	Nominations
ASCAP Latin Awards	1	1
Association of Latin Entertainment Critics	6	8
Billboard Latin Music Awards	3	4
DownBeat Critics' Poll Awards	5	5
Grammy Awards	7	13
Latin Grammy Awards	2	2
The Recording Academy	2	2

Totals (Note: Certain award groups do not simply award one winner. They acknowledge several different recipients, have runners-up, and have third place. Since this is a specific recognition and is different from losing an award, runner-up mentions are considered wins in this award tally. For simplification and to avoid errors, each award in this list has been presumed to have had a prior nomination.)
- Wins: 82
- Nominations: 100

Tito Puente (1923-2000), was an American musician, bandleader and record producer. His music career spanned over five decades, in which he received numerous awards and recognitions, and posthumously as well. According to Billboard, Puente was recognised with various honorific nicknames, from "King of Latin Music" to "King of the Timbales".

Puente's awards include six Grammy Awards from twelve nominations in competitive categories, two Latin Grammys, three Billboard Latin Music Awards (including a honorific recognition), various Latin ACE by the Association of Latin Entertainment Critics, as well he was a regular winner of the Critics and Readers Polls by major publications, including DownBeat.

His career and contributions to music industry was recognized with various lifetime achievement awards, among them, from the Billboard Latin Music Awards in 1995, and a Grammy Lifetime Achievement Award in 2003. He also received honors outside of the music industry, including a National Medal of Arts from the United States Congress (1997), the Library of Congress Living Legend (2000), as well various honorary degrees from some colleges and keys to the city. Puente was admitted into multiple halls and walks of fames, including Hollywood Walk of Fame (1990), International Latin Music Hall of Fame (1999), Latin Songwriters Hall of Fame (2016), and the DownBeat Hall of Fame by Veterans Committee in 2025. He was crowned Grand Marshal in differents Puerto Rican Day Parade.

== Awards and nominations ==
Award/organization (Note: Charts are not included, unless they are explicitly described as "awards" or specific trophies are given.)	Year	Nominee/work	Category	Result	Ref.
American Association of Independent Music (NAIRD Indie Awards)	1989	Salsa Meets Jazz	Latin Record of the Year	Nominated	
American Association of Independent Music (NAIRD Indie Awards)	1991	"Goza mi Timbal"	Latin Record of the Year	Won	
American Association of Independent Music (NAIRD Indie Awards)	1992	"Out of this World"	Latin Record of the Year	Won	
American Association of Independent Music (NAIRD Indie Awards)	1993	Mambo of the Times	Latin Record of the Year	Won	
American Association of Independent Music (NAIRD Indie Awards)	1994	"Royal, T"	Latin Record of the Year	Won	
American Association of Independent Music (NAIRD Indie Awards)	1995	"Master Timbalero"	Latin Record of the Year	Nominated	
American World Music Awards (AWMA)	2001	Tito Puente	Lifetime Achiviement Award	Honoree	
ASCAP Latin Awards	1994	Tito Puente	Founders Award	Honoree	
Asociación de Hispanos (Nosotros)	1991	Tito Puente	Golden Eagle: Lifetime Achievement in Music	Honoree	
Association of Latin Entertainment Critics (Latin ACE, New York)	1970	Tito Puente	Orchestra of the Year	Won	
Association of Latin Entertainment Critics (Latin ACE, New York)	1979	Homenaje a Benny	Salsa Album of the Year	Nominated	
Association of Latin Entertainment Critics (Latin ACE, New York)	1981	Tito Puente	Orchestra of the Year	Won	
Association of Latin Entertainment Critics (Latin ACE, New York)	1995	In Session	Best Latin Jazz Album	Won	
Association of Latin Entertainment Critics (Latin ACE, New York)	1998	Tito Puente	Outstanding Professional Achievements	Honoree	
Association of Latin Entertainment Critics (Latin ACE, New York)	2001	Tito Puente with Eddie Palmieri	Most Outstanding International Orchestra	Nominated	
Billboard Latin Music Awards	1995	Tito Puente	Billboard Lifetime Achievement Award	Honoree	
Billboard Latin Music Awards	1997	"Oye Cómo Va"	Best Tropical/Salsa Video of the Year	Won	
Billboard Latin Music Awards	1997	Jazzin (La India and Count Basie Orchestra)	Contemporary Latin Jazz Album of the Year	Won	
Billboard Latin Music Awards	2001	Obra Maestra (with Eddie Palmieri)	Tropical/Salsa Album of the Year, Male	Nominated	
Billboard Number One Awards (Year-End Awards)	1977	Tito Puente (La Leyenda)	Latin National Salsa	Nominated	
Billboard Number One Awards (Year-End Awards)	1979	Homenaje a Benny, Tico	Top Latin Salsa Album	Nominated	
Billboard Number One Awards (Year-End Awards)	1986	Tito Puente and Celia Cruz	Top Tropical/Salsa Artist	Nominated	
Billboard Number One Awards (Year-End Awards)	1986	Homenaje a Benny More, Vol. 3 (with Celia Cruz)	Top Tropical/Salsa Album	Nominated	
Billboard Video Music Awards	2000	"Mambo Birdland"	Best Clip of the Year	Nominated	
Black Musicians' Conference	1985	Tito Puente	Distinguished Achievement Awards	Honoree	
Bronx-Lebanon Hospital Center	1989	Tito Puente	Distinguished Services Award	Honoree	
Caribbean Music Awards	1992	Tito Puente	Lifetime Achievement Award	Honoree	
Casandra Awards (a.k.a. Soberano Awards)	1996	Tito Puente	Soberano International	Honoree	
Casita Maria (Note: A Puerto Rican settlement house)	1992	Tito Puente	Gold Medal Award	Honoree	
DownBeat Critics' Poll Awards	1987	Tito Puente	Top Percussionist / Percussion Artist of the Year	Won	
DownBeat Critics' Poll Awards	1989	Tito Puente	Top Percussionist / Percussion Artist of the Year	Won	
DownBeat Critics' Poll Awards	1992	Tito Puente	Top Percussionist / Percussion Artist of the Year	Won	
DownBeat Critics' Poll Awards	1996	Tito Puente	Top Percussionist / Percussion Artist of the Year	Won	
DownBeat Critics' Poll Awards	1997	Tito Puente	Top Percussionist / Percussion Artist of the Year	Won	
Front Page Music Awards (New York Daily News) (Note: The Daily News Front Page Music Poll was the first cosumer balloting for top music performers ever held by a major newspaper. The first edition was created in 1978, which results drew more than 350,00 responses from the paper's readers.)	1978	Tito Puente	Best Latin Group	Won	
Front Page Music Awards (New York Daily News)	1978	Tito Puente	Best Instrumental Group	Won	
Front Page Music Awards (New York Daily News)	1980	Tito Puente	Best Orchestra	Won	
Globo Awards (New York) (Note: transl. Globe Awards, an award given by El Globo newspaper)	1999	Tito Puente	Music Career Award	Honoree	
Grammy Awards	1978	La Leyenda	Best Latin Recording	Nominated	
Grammy Awards	1979	Homenaje a Beny More	Best Latin Recording	Won	
Grammy Awards	1981	Dancemania '80	Best Latin Recording	Nominated	
Grammy Awards	1984	On Broadway	Best Tropical Latin Performance	Won	
Grammy Awards	1986	Mambo Diablo	Best Tropical Latin Performance	Won	
Grammy Awards	1987	Homenaje A Beny More - Vol. III	Best Tropical Latin Performance	Nominated	
Grammy Awards	1991	Lambada Timbales	Best Tropical Latin Performance	Won	
Grammy Awards	1991	Tito Puente Presents Millie P.	Best Tropical Latin Performance	Nominated	
Grammy Awards	1992	The Mambo King 100th LP	Best Tropical Latin Performance	Nominated	
Grammy Awards	1999	Live At Birdland - Dancemania '99	Best Tropical Latin Performance	Nominated	
Grammy Awards	2000	Mambo Birdland	Best Traditional Tropical Latin Performance	Won	
Grammy Awards	2001	Masterpiece/Obra Maestra (with Eddie Palmieri)	Best Salsa Album	Won	
Grammy Awards	2003	Tito Puente	Lifetime Achievement Award	Honoree	
Hispanic Heritage Foundation	1994	Tito Puente	Hispanic Heritage Awards: Art Category	Honoree	
Latin Achievement Awards (Note: An award created by Richard Bonilla, either cited as Latin Achievement Awards or Latin Night Awards by publications such as Record World and Billboard.)	1973	Tito Puente	Best Orchestra	Won	
Latin Achievement Awards	1973	Tito Puente	Best Musician	Won	
Latin Achievement Awards	1973	Tito Puente	Best Band Under Eight Pieces	Won	
Latin Grammy Awards	2000	Mambo Birdland	Best Traditional Tropical Album	Won	
Latin Grammy Awards	2001	Obra Maestra (with Eddie Palmieri)	Best Salsa Album	Won	
Latin N.Y. Magazine Awards (Note: Also known as Latin N.Y. Music and Entertainment Awards. According to Billboard, Latin N.Y. Magazine was an English-language monthly heavily focused on music (with emphasis on Salsa), and directed towards young Puerto Rican community.)	1975	Tito Puente	Best All-Star Band — Timbales	Won	
Latin N.Y. Magazine Awards	1975	Tito Puente	Arranger of the Year	Won (Tie)	
Latin N.Y. Magazine Awards	1979	Tito Puente	Best Musician of the Year	Won	
Latin N.Y. Magazine Awards	1979	Homenaje a Beny More	Best Timbales of the Year	Won	
Latin N.Y. Magazine Awards	1979	"Yiri-Yiri Bon"	Arranger of the Year	Won	
Latin N.Y. Magazine Awards	1979	"Que Bueno Baila Usted"	Arranger of the Year	Nominated	
Latin Jazz USA	1990	Tito Puente	Special Condecoration	Honoree	
NCLR Bravo Awards	1996	26th Olympiad: Closing Ceremonies	Outstanding Male Performance in Variety or Musical Special	Nominated	
Onda Nueva Festival	1971	Tito Puente	Arranger	8th place	
Record World (New York and Puerto Rico Awards)	1972	Tito Puente	Top Orchestra Director of the Year	Won	
Record World (New York and Puerto Rico Awards)	1974	Tito Puente	Top Orchestra Director of the Year	Won	
Record World (International Latin Awards)	1971	Tito Puente	Top Impact Latin Composers in the American and European Markets	2nd place	
The Recording Academy	1989	Tito Puente	Eubie Award	Honoree	
The Recording Academy	2001	Tito Puente	Heroes Award	Honoree	
Yupi / Hispanic Federation	2000	Tito Puente	Pride Award	Honoree	

== Other honors ==
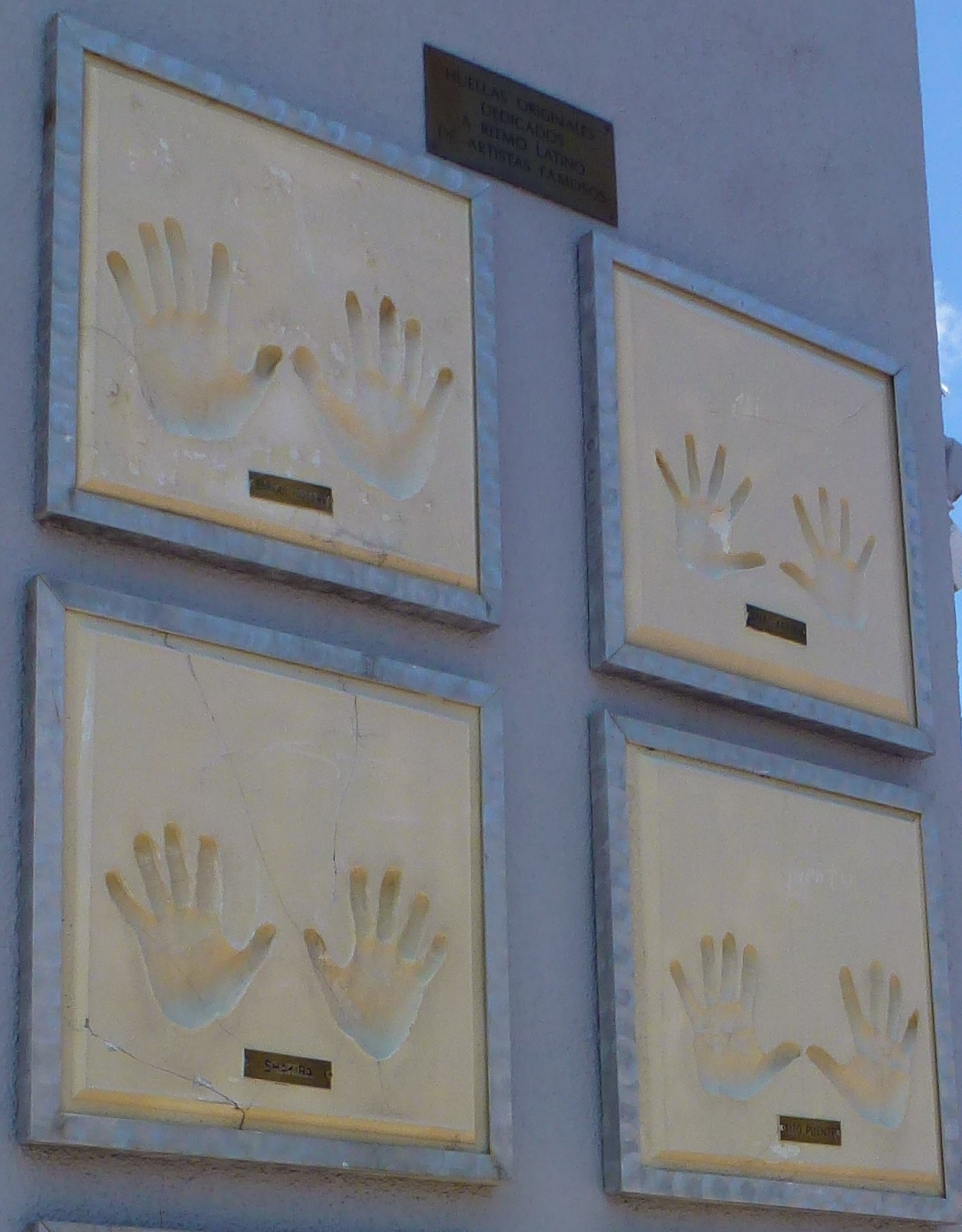
Tito Puente's handprints at Ritmo Latino's San Fernando Mall.

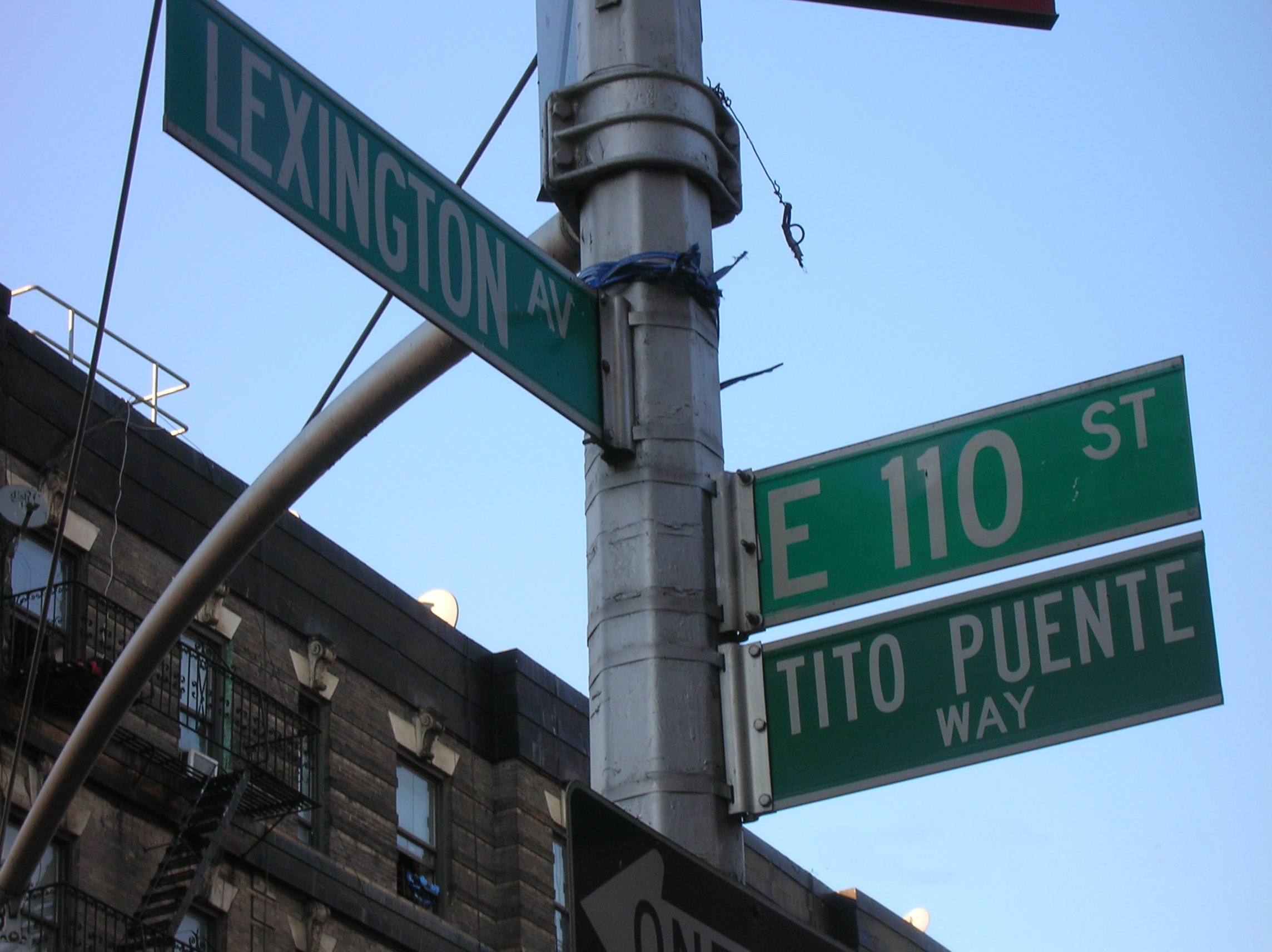
The Puente Way in Manhattan, New York

List of state/legislative honors
Country	Gov./Entity	Year	Description	Status	Ref.
United States	Mayor John Lindsay	1969	Keys to the City, New York City	Honoree	
United States	Smithsonian Institution	1990	James Smithson Bicentennial Medal	Honoree	
United States	Smithsonian Institution	1993	Medal of Honor	Honoree	
United States	Senate of Puerto Rico	1996	Special Condecoration	Honoree	
United States	United States Congress (National Endowment for the Arts)	1997	National Medal of Arts	Honoree	
United States	Governor of New York (George Pataki)	1998	Governor's Art Awards	Honoree	
United States	Library of Congress	2000	Living Legend Award	Honoree	
United States	Ald. Gilbert Villegas	2024	Heroes and Heritage Award	Honoree	

List of Walk of Fame/Hall of Fames
Walk of Fame	Year	Description	Status	Ref.
Hollywood Walk of Fame	1990	Walk of Star	Inducted	
International Jazz Hall of Fame	1997	Hall of Fame inductee	Inducted	
Latin Jazz Hall of Fame (Note: According to Los Angeles Times, an award given by the Latin Jazz Institute)	1999	Hall of Fame inductee	Inducted	
International Latin Music Hall of Fame	1999	Hall of Fame inductee	Inducted	
Percussive Arts Society (PAS) Hall of Fame	2001	Hall of Fame inductee	Inducted	
Grammy Hall of Fame	2002	"Oye Cómo Va" inductee	Inducted	
Ritmo Latino	2003	Handprints Hall of Fame	Inducted	
Union City Walk of Fame (New Jersey)	2006	Walk of Fame	Inducted	
Latin Songwriters Hall of Fame	2016	Hall of Fame inductee	Inducted	
Latin Songwriters Hall of Fame	2016	"Oye Cómo Va" honored as Canción de todos los Tiempos	Honoree	
The Nesuhi Ertegun Jazz Hall of Fame	2017	Hall of Fame inductee	Inducted	
East Coast Music Hall of Fame	2019	Latin Music Legend Award	Won	
DownBeat (Veterans Committee) Hall of Fame	2025	Hall of Fame inductee	Inducted	

List of honors from colleges and academia
Year	Description	Status	Ref.
1987	Honorary Doctorate from SUNY at Old Westbury	Honoree	
1989	Honorary Doctorate in Music from Berklee College of Music	Honoree	
1992	Honorary Doctor of Music from Hunter College	Honoree	
1994	Honorary Doctorate from Long Island University	Honoree	
1999	Honorary Doctor of Music from Columbia University	Honoree	
2000	Chubb Fellowship honor	Honoree	

List of cultural honors
Year	Description	Status	Ref.
1967	Grand Marshal at Puerto Rican Day Parade	Honoree	
1987	Grand Marshal at Puerto Rican Day Parade	Honoree	
1999	Grand Marshal at Puerto Rican Day Parade	Honoree	
