= Los Pajaritos =

Promotional single by Juan Luis Guerra

from the album Fogaraté
- B-side: "La Cosquillita"
- Released: March 7, 1995
- Recorded: 1994
- Studio: 440 Studio; (New York, New York)
- Genre: Son
- Length: 4:02
- Label: Karen Records
- Songwriter(s): Juan Luis Guerra

Los Pajaritos (English: the little birds) is a song recorded by Dominican singer Juan Luis Guerra for his seventh studio album, Fogarate (1994), included as its third track. It was released to airwaves on March 7, 1995, by Karen Records, as the record's promotional single, following the release of "El Beso de la Ciguaterra". The track was received well by the critics and explores the sound of Cuban son. John Lannert from Billboard named the track a strong single peak. The authors Darío Tejeda and Rafael Emilio Yunén stated, the track composed by Guerra and 4.40 "Contributed to the legitimization of son among the elite and upper-class, as they have also made their recordings for the other popular genres". The track charted at US Latin Cashbox charts and was added to radio stations and receive airplay in Spain and Belgium.

== Track listing ==
- Spain CD-single (1995)
1. "Los Parajitos" – 4:02
2. "La Cosquillita" – 3:40

== Charts ==
Chart (1995)	Peak position
US Contemporary Pop (Cashbox)	23
US Tropical Airplay (Cashbox)	8
