= El Costo de la Vida =

Single by Juan Luis Guerra

from the album Areito
- B-side: "Burbujas de Amor"
- Released: 1992
- Studio: 4:40
- Genre: Merengue
- Length: 4:10
- Label: Karen
- Composer: Diblo Dibala
- Lyricist: Juan Luis Guerra

Juan Luis Guerra singles chronology
"Señales de Humo" (1992)	"El Costo de la Vida" (1992)	"Mal de Amor" (1993)

Music video
- "El Costo de la Vida" on YouTube

"El Costo de la Vida" (transl. "The Cost of Living") is a song by Dominican Republic singer-songwriter Juan Luis Guerra from his sixth studio album, Areíto (1992). The song was released as the album's third single in 1992 by Karen Records. It is a Spanish-language adaptation of soukous song "Kimia Eve" composed by Diblo Dibala. The song features Dibala on the guitar and is performed by Guerra as a merengue number. The lyrics to the song provides a social commentary to the rising cost of living, while Guerra denounces the dislevel of socioeconomics as well as political corruptions in Latin America. Guerra also references the racial identities of Latin America.

The song received positive reactions from music critics for its social commentary and music. "El Costo de la Vida" won the Lo Nuestro Award for Tropical Song of the Year at the 1993 Lo Nuestro Awards which caused controversy with the Cuban community in Miami. Commercially, the song reached number one on the Billboard Hot Latin Songs chart in the United States. The music video for the song features Guerra as a newscaster who reports about the cost of living. The video includes graphic content depicting the poverty and repression Latin American countries suffered from. Due to the violent nature of the scenes, it was censured in several Latin America countries, despite still receiving substantial play in both Latin America and the US.

== Background and composition ==
"El Costo de la Vida"
A 25-second sample of "El Costo de la Vida", a merengue song in which Guerra sings about the rising cost of living.

In 1990, Juan Luis Guerra released his fifth studio album Bachata Rosa which sold over five million copies and won the Grammy Award for Best Tropical Latin Album in 1992. The album popularized the bachata genre which became mainstream in the Dominican Republic, having been previously seen as music for the lower-class. When Guerra recorded the following album, Areíto (1992), he stated: "[t]here was lot of pressure for me, as well as the record label, principally because of the audience, which is always waiting for a hit. The problem is that people get used to a type of song, but an artist always has to be evolving. This album is completely different than the last one." Recording took place at his 4:40 Studio in New York City with Guerra handling its production and writing the lyrics for all the tracks. The final release consists of various Latin music styles including merengue, mambo, salsa, bachata, cha-cha-cha and balada.

One of the album's merengue tracks is "El Costo de la Vida", which is a Spanish-language adaptation of the 1988 soukous song "Kimia Eve" by Congolese band Loketo. The band's lead musician and song composer Diblo Dibala makes an appearance on the track playing the soukous guitar for Guerra's cover. The merengue tune also features a South African melody. It is one of the album's two protest songs, in which Guerra sings about "tragi-comical, socio- political realities". In the song, he strongly denounces the dislevel of socioeconomics as well as political corruptions. Guerra critiques the consequences of the global economic situation in Latin America and proclaims: "Nobody cares because we don't speak English, not Mitsubishi, not Chevrolet". He also comments about the cost of living going up stating "you can't eat beans anymore or a pound of rice or a measure of coffee". Guerra also makes references to the racial identities of Latin America since the encounter of the New World by European settlers 500 years ago and asks "but, who discover whom?"

== Music video ==
The accompanying music video portrays Guerra as a newscaster who reports the cost of living. The news monitor behind the singer depicts graphic content with footages of starving children, the Chilean military dictatorship and the deforestation of the Amazon rainforest. This content is interspersed with scenes of "erotic modern dance" and footage of Japanese sumo wrestlers. The video was controversial and censured in North America and Latin America. Guerra was asked by network stations to remove the graphic content which he refused to do as it is the "reality of our nations". Despite the controversy, the video received substantial play in both continents and was nominated in the category of Video of the Year at the 5th Annual Lo Nuestro Awards in 1993, but ultimately lost to "Una Rosa Es una Rosa" by Mecano. It was nominated for International Viewer's Choice: MTV International at the 1993 MTV Video Music Awards, which was awarded to "América, América" by Luis Miguel. The video won Best Music Video at 1993's Soberano Awards.

== Promotion and reception ==
"El Costo de la Vida" was released as the album's third single in 1992 by Karen Records. The track was included on Guerra's greatest hits album Grandes Éxitos Juan Luis Guerra y 440 (1995). He performed the track live as part of the set list for the Areíto Tour (1993). AllMusic editor Jason Birchmeier praised it as a "witty song with a sharp socio-political edge unlike anything Guerra had written to date, let alone released as a single". The Los Angeles Times critic Enrique Lopetegui called the track a "biting but gentle critique on the economic situation of Latin America". John Lannert of the Sun-Sentinel stated that the song "reveals a South African melody layered over a thumping merengue beat". Larry Birnbaum wrote for Newsday that Guerra "translates Zairean soukous into hip-wiggling merengue". Similarly, the Rolling Stone editor Daisann McLane noted the artist "transforms a soukous by Zaire's Diblo Dibala into a bubbly merengue romp".

J.D. Considine of the Rapid City Journal felt the "most interesting tracks are those that go beyond the usual stylistic boundaries of salsa", citing "El Costo de la Vida" and "Mal de Amor" and highlighted the former for its "soukous-style guitar lines that color" the song. The Boston Globe reviewer Fernando Gonzalez called the track a "nod to soukous and zouk". The Chicago Tribune's Achy Obejas found the music to be "playful, ironic". Ramiro Burr from the Austin American-Statesman called the song a "bold, political statement". Cashbox journalist Rafael A. Charres complimented it as a "phenomenal single". An editor for Billboard cautioned that the music video might "slow the song's ascent" on their Hot Latin Songs chart. Despite the editor's concern, it became Guerra's first song to reach the chart's summit.

At the 1993 Lo Nuestro Awards, "El Costo de la Vida" won Tropical Song of the Year. The accolade was met with outrage by several Cuban exiles living in Miami who accused Guerra of being a communist. "That was one of the most difficult moments in my career", Guerra recalled. The backlash by the community was condemned by Cuban American singer Gloria Estefan. The track was recognized as one of the best-performing songs of the year at the inaugural BMI Latin Awards in 1994.

== Track listing ==
Promotional single

1. "El Costo de la Vida" – 4:09
2. "Ojala Que Llueva Cafe" – 4:10
3. "Burbujas de Amor" – 4:13

== Charts ==
=== Weekly charts ===
Weekly chart positions for "El Costo de la Vida"
Chart (1993)	Peak position
US Hot Latin Songs (Billboard)	1

=== Year-end charts ===
1993 year-end chart performance for "El Costo de la Vida"
Chart (1993)	Position
US Hot Latin Songs (Billboard)	18

== See also ==
- List of number-one Billboard Hot Latin Tracks of 1993
