= Rompiendo Fuente =

Single by Juan Luis Guerra

from the album Areito
- B-side: "Guavaberry"
- Released: 1993
- Recorded: 1992
- Genre: Merengue
- Length: 4:26
- Label: Karem

Juan Luis Guerra singles chronology
"Coronita de Flores" (1993)	"Rompiendo Fuente" (1993)	"Cuando Te Beso" (1994)

Rompiendo Fuente (English: Water Break) is the sixth single of Juan Luis Guerra sixth studio album Areito, released in 1993 by Karem Records. The song was written and produced by Juan Luis Guerra and his band 4:40. The tracks is a merengue with some elements of Afropop inspired Taino Indigenous. The song is a metaphor lamenting precarious situation of a woman working on a factory that is giving a birth to a girl. The track receive favorable reviews by the critics. Howell Llewelyn from Billboard on an article wrote about the song "the most touching song ever written by a man on the subject of giving birth".

== Tracklist ==
- Spain CD-Single (1993)
  1. Rompiendo Fuerte - 4:26
  2. Guavaberry - 4:19

== Charts ==
Chart (1993)	Peak position
Dominican Republic (UPI)	10
US Hot Latin Songs (Billboard)	27
