= Stabat Mater (Jenkins) =

Studio album by Karl Jenkins
- Released: 10 March 2008
- Recorded: 2007
- Genre: Classical
- Length: 62:02
- Label: EMI
- Producer: Karl Jenkins

Karl Jenkins chronology
Requiem	Stabat Mater (2008)	Te Deum (2008)

Stabat Mater is a 2008 composition for choir and orchestra by Karl Jenkins, based on the 13th-century prayer Stabat Mater. Like much of Jenkins' earlier work, the work incorporates both traditional Western music (orchestra and choir) with ethnic instruments and vocals, this time focusing on the Middle East. The first recording features the Royal Liverpool Philharmonic Orchestra and Choir, along with two soloists, Lithuanian mezzo-soprano Jurgita Adamonyte, and English musician Belinda Sykes, who both sings and performs on the duduk, an Armenian reed instrument.

== Background ==
Written in the 13th century, the title Stabat Mater is actually an abbreviation of the first line, "Stabat Mater dolorosa" ('The sorrowful Mother was standing'). The poem reflects on the suffering of Mary, mother of Jesus, at the time of the Crucifixion. Lasting just over one hour on the debut recording, Jenkins' setting of the 20-verse poem is one of the longest of hundreds of extant settings of the work.

== Jenkins' adaptation ==
Stabat Mater focuses on the suffering of Mary, but unlike most adaptations of the text, Jenkins uses languages other than Latin and his native English. Jenkins' work extends across twelve movements, six of which use texts other than the original poem. They include a choral arrangement of the "Ave verum" Jenkins originally wrote for Bryn Terfel; "And The Mother Did Weep," which features a single line sung simultaneously in English, Latin, Greek, Aramaic, and Hebrew; "Lament," a poem by Jenkins' wife Carol Barratt; and "Incantation," which is partly sung in early Arabic. It also features two poems—a poem by Rumi and an excerpt from the Epic of Gilgamesh—translated into English and Aramaic.

The addition of the Armenian duduk (or ney) heightens the Eastern atmosphere, and its deep double-reeded sound adds a richer, more resonant dimension to the work than can perhaps be achieved using orchestra alone. Alongside the duduk, Jenkins features percussion from the Middle East, such as the darabuca, def, doholla, and riq.

The first movement is an extended variation of a piece from Adiemus, Cantus: Song of Tears, using the same format (with soft introduction preceding the main melody) and harmonisation. The seventh movement, "And The Mother Did Weep," adapts "Amaté Adea," the seventh movement of the first Adiemus album.

== Premiere and recording ==
Stabat Mater received its world premiere in Liverpool Anglican Cathedral on Saturday 15 March 2008 and featured the Royal Liverpool Philharmonic Choir and Orchestra, Jurgita Adamonyté, Belinda Sykes, and was conducted by Jenkins himself. The work was recorded with the same personnel and the EMO Ensemble of Helsinki, and was released by EMI on 10 March 2008.

== Movements ==
Jenkins' Stabat Mater is divided into 12 movements. Unlike his Requiem, no movements combine both liturgical and non-liturgical texts. The table gives the forces used for the 2007 recording; the score calls for a single contralto soloist (recorded by mezzo-soprano Adamonyte and vocalist Sykes) and a single chorus.

Movement	Texts/Language(s)
1. Cantus lacrimosus (full chorus, chamber chorus)	Verses 1–4 of the Stabat Mater
2. Incantation (vocalist)	Traditional texts (Arabic)
3. Vidit Jesum in tormentis (chamber chorus)	Verses 5–10 of the Stabat Mater
4. Lament (mezzo-soprano)	A poem by Carol Barratt (English)
5. Sancta Mater (full chorus, chamber chorus)	Verses 11–14 of the Stabat Mater
6. Now my life is only weeping (mezzo-soprano, vocalist, chamber chorus)	A poem by Rumi (English, Aramaic)
7. And the Mother did weep (chamber chorus)	A line by Karl Jenkins (English, Hebrew, Latin, Aramaic, Greek)
8. Virgo Virginum (chamber chorus)	Verse 15 of the Stabat Mater
9. Are you lost out in darkness? (mezzo-soprano, vocalist, chamber chorus)	The Epic of Gilgamesh (English, Aramaic)
10. Ave verum (chamber chorus)	Ave Verum Corpus (Latin)
11. Fac, ut portem Christi mortem (chamber chorus)	Verses 16–17 of the Stabat Mater
12. Paradisi Gloria (full chorus, chamber chorus)	Verses 18–20 of the Stabat Mater
