= Coronita de Flores =

- Cover CD-Single release in Spain (1993)

Single by Juan Luis Guerra

from the album Areito
- Language: Spanish
- Released: 1993
- Recorded: 1992
- Genre: Bolero; Cha-Cha
- Length: 4:17
- Label: Karem Records

Juan Luis Guerra singles chronology
"Mal de Amor" (1993)	"Coronita de Flores" (1993)	"Rompiendo Fuente" (1993)

Coronita de Flores (English: Flower Crown) is the fifth single of Juan Luis Guerra sixth studio album Areito, released in 1993 by Karem Records. The song was written band produced by Juan Luis Guerra. The track received positive reviews due the musical structure of cha-cha and Bolero and was nominated for Tropical/Salsa Song of the Year at the 1994's Lo Nuestro Awards.

The song was a recipient of a Broadcast Music, Inc. (BMI) Latin Award in 1995. The song was a commercial success peaked at number 4 on US Billboard Hot Latin Tracks and Latin American Airplay Charts. The track was included on Guerra's compilation album Colección Romantica (2001).

== Track listing ==
- Spain CD-Single (1993)
  1. Coronita de Flores – 4:17
  2. El Costo de la Vida – 4:10

== Charts ==
Chart (1993)	Peak position
Chile (IFPI)	5
Uruguay (UPI)	7
US Hot Latin Songs (Billboard)	4
Venezuela (UPI)	2
