= Rodrigo Rodríguez (musician) =

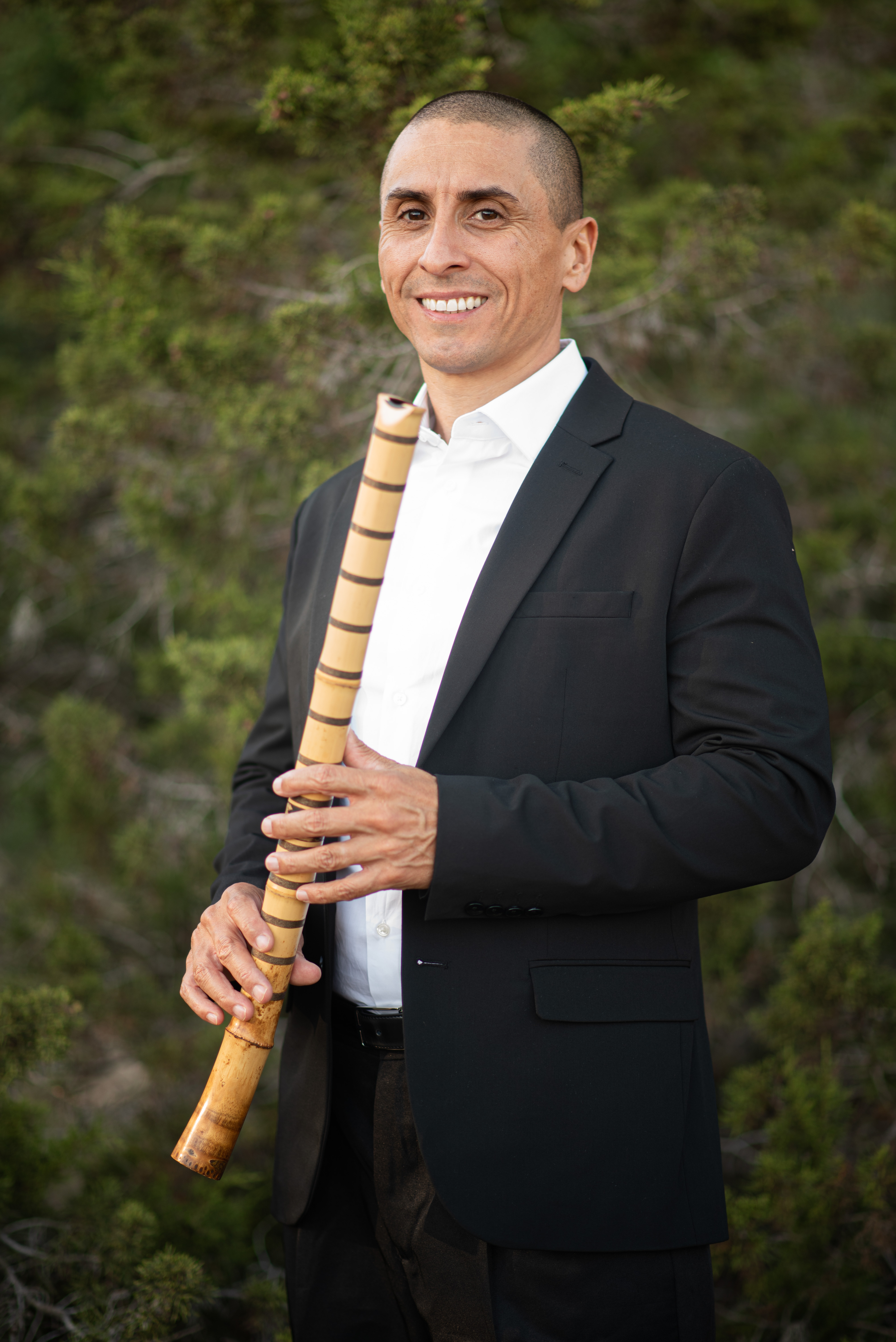
- Rodrigo Rodriguez in 2014

Background information
- Born: 29 August 1978 (age 48); San Carlos de Bolívar, Argentina
- Origin: Argentina
- Genres: Traditional Japanese music, new-age, world
- Occupations: Shakuhachi player, composer, record producer
- Instrument: Shakuhachi
- Years active: 2000–present
- Label: Insight Music
- Website: www.rodrigo-rodriguez.info

Rodrigo Rodríguez (born 29 August 1978) is a Spanish shakuhachi player.

== Life and career ==
Rodrigo Rodríguez was born in 1978 in San Carlos de Bolívar, Argentina. He moved with his family to Mallorca, Spain in 1986. He began playing and study classical western music when he was 10 years old. Rodriguez studied classical guitar and composition in order to classical western music. He has lived and studied shakuhachi in Japan under the discipline of the Master Kaoru Kakizakai in The International Shakuhachi Kenshunkan School and with Kohachiro Miyata one of Japan's leading players of the shakuhachi.

In 2008 he put out the album "Various Artists Music That Illuminates Your Life" by the record company Gemini Sun Records which was distributed by ADA / Warner Music Group sharing multi-artist compilation with artists as David Arkenstone and Terry Oldfield.

On August 28, 2008 his third album "Beyond the Times" was chosen by John Diliberto and Echoes as one of the Top 25 Albums.

Rodrigo has performed worldwide, at stages like Imperial Hotel Tokyo, NHK Culture events, and in the Temple Kōtoku-in of the "Great Buddha" of Kamakura city which is one of the most famous icons of Japan.

In 2012 he was invited to perform in Moscow, in the Tchaikovsky Conservatory for the International Festival "Nihon No Kokoro" which is directed by scientific and creative "World Music Cultures Center" of the Moscow Tchaikovsky State Conservatory.

On March 1, 2013, Rodriguez released his sixth album "The Road of Hasekura Tsunenaga " dedicated to the first Japanese diplomatic mission to Spain, which departed from Ishinomaki in October 1613 and arrived in Seville 1614. The album was supported by Japan Foundation, Embassy of Japan in Spain, Coria del Rio, Casa Galicia Japon, SGAE and the committee of the Spain-Japan Dual Year.

He continues to tour the world playing in large and small venues. In November 2014, he performed in the city of Sendai and Ishinomaki for the recovery of 2011 Tōhoku earthquake and tsunami. The tour was sponsored by Embassy of Spain in Tokyo and the Sendai Ikuei Gakuen school.

In 2014 Rodrigo Rodriguez was invited to perform at the first International World Congress of Jikiden Reiki, held in the city of Barcelona, for the conference of Japanese author and researcher Dr. Masaru Emoto.

In 2016 Rodrigo Rodriguez offer his first concert in the United States, in the city of Eau Claire, Wisconsin Gantner Concert Hall Haas Fine Arts Center.

On February 1 of 2018 Rodrigo released his eighth album "The Classical Music Legacy of Japan", Rodrigo selects an expanded repertoire of classical music from Japan. Also including the well-known Spanish master piece Concierto de Aranjuez composed by Joaquin Rodrigo for Classical Guitar and flute Shakuhachi.

In April 2018, Rodrigo performs for the first time in New York, invited to play at the Brooklyn Botanical Garden Festival, Sakura Matsuri (festival), offering two concerts as a soloist.

On November 1, 2018 Rodrigo releases the single Shakuhachi: The Zen Flute (The Distant Call of the Deer) a single collaboration with his teacher Kohachiro Miyata. The traditional piece (Honkyoku) Shika no Tone (The Distant Call of the Deer) was arranged in 1974 by Kohachiro Miyata is an original work of the 18th century. The Distant Call of the Deer describes a scene in the autumn, when the bellowing of the male deer covers the sound spectrum of the forests in Japan. This record work was recorded in Tokyo in October 2018.

On January 23, 2019 Rodrigo offers a concert as part of the visit to Galicia of the governor of the Yoshinobu Nisaka prefecture and celebration of the 20th anniversary of the twinning agreement between the Ancient Road de Kumano and The Camino de Santiago.

In September 2019 Rodrigo performs a series of concerts at the Ma-Cho Temple (Gem of Taoist) in the Philippine Islands. Rodrigo frequently selects scenes of great religious, historical and architectural quality.

On January 16, 2020 Rodrigo performs in Baguio's hidden secret the Temple Bell Church, for cultural and spiritual lives of the Filipino-Chinese community living in the "City of Pines."

On February 9, 2020, Rodrigo Rodríguez releases the single For Luna (Variations of Neptune), a musical work dedicated to his daughter. This work was composed for electronic music and shakuhachi flute. In the content of this musical project is also included the music video with the Footage of ESA and the Hubble Space Telescope. The album was presented for the first time in an interview on Radio Nacional de España (RNE) (National Radio of Spain).

On 22 March 2021, Rodrigo Rodriguez released his first official Insight Music EP "One More Night" "We'll Meet Again" combining the Japanese Shakuhachi flute and Ambient electronica and Future Garage music.

On May 5, 2021, Rodrigo Rodríguez publishes as a soloist the album Blowing Zen - Shakuhachi Meditation Music, a record work dedicated to the ancient practice of Suizen (blowing zen) .This album was released by Label Tunog Kawayan record in South Asia.

On Oct 27, 2023 Rodrigo Rodriguez released the album Shakuhachi -Japan

In 2023, he contributed to the soundtrack of the video game Age of Empires IV. His work is featured in the track titled "Court of the Chrysanthemum." This soundtrack was officially released on September 29, 2023.

On March 5, 2024, Rodrigo Rodriguez released the album Tribute to his Master Kohachiro Miyata, Kohachiro Miyata: The Complete Masterworks for Shakuhachi, a compilation of the most notable works composed by Kohachiro Miyata.

On September 4, 2024, Rodrigo Rodriguez completed an important recording in Tokyo, accompanied by his master Kohachiro Miyata, Washuu Yoneya, Iiyoshi Norikumi, and Jun Watanabe.

On 13 October 2025, Rodrigo Rodríguez participated as a musician in an exhibition by Cai Guo-Qiang in London at the White Cube Gallery, performing live on the shakuhachi during the show. His performance was part of the exhibition's musical program, contributing to the visitors' experience and the integration of music within the context of contemporary art.

On 1 August 2026, Rodrigo Rodríguez was invited to perform at the World Flute Society Convention, held at the University of Wisconsin–Eau Claire. He performed on the shakuhachi, the traditional Japanese bamboo flute, presenting the musical tradition and legacy of his school founded by Kohachiro Miyata.

== Discography ==
- Inner Thoughts, 2006
- Across the East, 2007
- Beyond the Times, 2008
- Shakuhachi Meditations, 2010
- Traditional and Modern Pieces - Shakuhachi -, 2012
- The Road of Hasekura Tsunenaga, 2013
- Music for Zen Meditation (Shakuhachi Japanese Flute), 2015
- The Classical Music Legacy of Japan, 2018
- Shakuhachi:The Zen Flute (The Distant Call of the Deer) single, 2018
- Music for Yoga and Reiki:Relaxation music for shakuhachi 2019
- Poem of Japan:Music for Shakuhachi Single, 2019
- For Luna (Variations of Neptune) Film Music for Shakuhachi flute Single, 2020
- Healing Buddha Music (New Age & Chill Out) Shakuhachi Flute Music , 2020
- "Fantasy of Oiwake (Shakuhachi flute)" 2020 (Single)
- "The Enlightenment Flute of Buddha (Shakuhachi Meditation)" 2020 (Single)
- "A Journey To The End Of the Universe " 2020 (Single)
- "Invocation (Shakuhachi Ambient Music) " 2020 (Single)
- "To My Mother (The Existence of Motion) " 2020 (Single)
- "Sound of the Crickets in the Inner Mountain - Shakuhachi Music " 2020 (Single)
- "Healing Buddha Music (New Age & Chill Out) Shakuhachi Flute Music " 2020
- "Asian Sunrise - Shakuhachi Flute " 2020 (Single)
- "The Island Echo " 2020 (Single)
- "In Your Light (Ambient Meditation Music) " 2020 (Single)
- "Hold To My Hands Till The End (Shakuhachi Cinematic Chillstep)" 2020 (Single)
- "Exosphere (Ambient Inspirational Music) " 2020 (Single)
- "Surrender (Chillstep) " 2020 (Single)
- "Real - Shakuhachi Emotional Chillstep " 2020 (Single)
- "Inside Of You (Shakuhachi Ambient Chillstep)" 2020 (Single)
- "You're Always By My Side (Chillstep - Ambient Music Shakuhachi)" 2021 (Single)
- " Sorrow (Shakuhachi Emotional Chillstep) " 2021 (Single)
- "Dancing Whales (Dreaming Shakuhachi Music)" (2021, Single)
- "Heading Towards You (Ambient & Chillstep)" (2021, Single)
- "One More Night/We’ll Meet Again" (2021, EP) Insight Music Label
- "I'm So Sorry" (2021, EP) Insight Music Label
- "Tell Me (Chill & Future Garage)" (2021, EP) Insight Music Label
- "Blowing Zen - Shakuhachi Meditation Music" (2021, Album) Tunog Kawayan Label
- "Ambientalism (Chill & Future Garage) " (2021, Album) Tunog Kawayan Label
- "Shakuhachi - The Spirit of Zen (Hifumi Hachigaeshi) " (2021, single) Tunog Kawayan Label
- "Zen Mystery - Shakuhachi Meditation Music " (2021, single) Tunog Kawayan Label
- "Zen Garden (Meditation Music for Shakuhachi and Koto)" (2022, album) Tunog Kawayan Label
- "Zen (Shakuhachi, Koto, Guqin, Yanqin, Gayageum) " 2022
- "Shakuhachi Solos " 2023
- "Shakuhachi - Japan " 2023
- "Kohachiro Miyata: The Complete Masterworks for Shakuhachi" 2024
- "Zen Retreat - Shakuhachi Meditation Music" 2025
- "Shakuhachi Classics" 2025
- "Zen Morning Breeze (Shakuhachi Meditation Music)" 2026

=== Compilations ===
- 2008 : "Various Artists Music That Illuminates Your Life"

=== Soutrack Video Games ===
- 2024 : " Age of Empires IV Soundtrack"
