= Señales de Humo =

- Cover of Venezuela vinyl, 12", Maxi-Single

Single by Juan Luis Guerra

from the album Areito
- Released: August 1992
- Recorded: 1992
- Genre: Bachata; Bolero; Mambo
- Length: 5:32
- Label: Karen Records

Juan Luis Guerra singles chronology
"Frío Frío" (1991)	"Señales de Humo" (1992)	"El Costo de la Vida" (1992)

Señales de Humo (transl. Smoke Signals) is the second single of Juan Luis Guerra's sixth studio album Areito (1992). The track is divided in two parts: The first part is a bachata and the second one the rhythm transformed to Mambo with elements of son and salsa. The title made reference of the communication that the indigenous use between vast and unpopulated areas and that are made by bonfires. The song met with critical acclaim and won Song of The Year at the 1994 BMI Latin Awards. The track was a great success in Latin America and Billboard US Latin charts. The track was included on Guerra`s compilation album Colección Romantica (2001).

== Charts ==
Chart (1992–93)	Peak position
Chile (IFPI)	2
Dominican Republic (UPI)	7
Mexico (AMPROFON)	5
Peru (UPI)	4
US Hot Latin Songs (Billboard)	6
Venezuela (UPI)	1
