= Areíto (album) =

Studio album by Juan Luis Guerra and 440
- Released: 8 December 1992
- Recorded: 1991–1992
- Studio: 440 Studio (New York City)
- Genres: Merengue, bachata
- Length: 46:19
- Label: Karen
- Producer: Juan Luis Guerra

Juan Luis Guerra chronology
Bachata Rosa (1990)	Areíto (1992)	Fogaraté (1994)

Singles from Areíto
- 1. "Frío Frío" Released: August 1991; 2. "Señales de Humo" Released: September 1992; 3. "El Costo de la Vida" Released: December 1992; 4. "Mal de Amor" Released: 1993; 5. "Coronita de Flores" Released: 1993; 6. "Rompiendo Fuente" Released: 1993; 7. "Cuando Te Beso" Released: 1993

Areíto is the sixth album by Juan Luis Guerra with his band 440, released on 8 December 1992, by Karen Records. The album, meant to be a tribute to the indigenous tribes of the Dominican Republic, is named after a dance that the aboriginal inhabitants of the Greater Antilles (Taínos) accompanied with songs during their festivals and religious rites. The album contains twelve tracks including "Cuando te Beso", interpret by Santo Domingo Philharmonic Orchestra. Congolese musician Diblo Dibala played guitar on the song "El Costo de la Vida", which was a Spanish cover of his own soukous song "Kimia Eve", while the last track on the album, "Naboria daca, mayanimacaná", is sung in Arawak, the language of the Taíno people. Areíto was originally set to be released in early April 1992, but was first delayed to the end of October 1992 and was finally released on 8 December 1992.

According to Guerra himself, Areíto did not serve as a follow-up to his previous album Bachata Rosa (1990). The album received universal acclaim from critics. It considered one of Guerra's best and most important albums, along with Bachata Rosa and Ojalá Que Llueva Café (1989). It was also his most introspective, as witnessed by the socio-political themes addressed in some songs. However, it faced some controversy due the strong social lyrics in some protest songs, and the music video of the album's third single, "El Costo de la Vida", was banned in several countries. The song album contains lyrics about poor conditions in many Latin American countries, the celebration of the 'discovery' of America and the double standards of first-world nations. Some critics' and detractors labeled this as anti-capitalist tendencies. Despite this "El Costo de la Vida" was his first number-one hit on the Hot Latin Tracks and won Tropical/Salsa Song of the Year at the 5th Lo Nuestro Awards.

Areíto was nominated for Best Tropical Latin Album at the 36th Annual Grammy Awards and received three nominations at the Lo Nuestro Awards, including Tropical/Salsa Album of the Year. To support the album, seven singles were released from the record, five of which became top-ten hits on the Billboard Hot Latin Songs chart. The album was a commercial success selling over two million copies. To promote this album, he embarked the Areíto World Tour in 1993, his largest tour at the time.

== Background and recording ==
Juan Luis Guerra's previous album, Bachata Rosa won the Grammy award for Best Tropical Album of 1991, and launched the international career of Guerra and his group, 4:40 selling over five million copies worldwide. The subsequent concert tour Bachata Rosa World Tour, was a success and his longest at the time. For this reason, Areito was highly anticipated by the media and fans at the time. The first single "Frio, Frio" was already on the airplay as late of 1991 and the album was set to be released in early 1992. In July 1992, Guerra announced the cancellation of the rest of his last leg in the United States stating that he wanted to do something fresh and new for the fans. He also stated that the album was inspired on the Tainos culture and was going to be released on September of that year. However, due to recovery from eye surgery, the album was postponed to October 1992. Eventually, the album was released on 8 December 1992.

However, On 17 September 1992, Guerra revealed to the press tilted of the album and explained "It will be an experimental album, in which arrangements Juan Luis will present the fusion of various rhythms. "There are sounds from Africa combined with the ripiao parakeet." In others they will listen to European and indigenous songs. There is also salsa with jazz, bolero—the traditional rhythm—with bachata, and fusions of merengue with plena.

== Concept and themes ==
The album is inspired by the sounds, dances and culture of the aboriginal inhabitants of the Greater Antilles, Tainos. The album title "Areito" made references of the name of the dance of the Tainos. When Columbus and his men landed on the shores of what is now the Dominican Republic in 1492, they were met by a group of Taino Indians who greeted the newcomers with a song called the Areito. About the title of the album the artist explained. "It is a word used by the Taino Indians of the Antilles to designate the way in which they told their stories" and the intention of the record is rescue the memory of this native culture that was decimated by the Spanish conquerors and rebuilt their culture and music legacy.

Taino lived on the Hispanionla island, now shared between Haiti and Dominican Republic. After Christopher Columbus arrived on the island and was forced to work in terrible conditions, their population decline from 225,000 to almost completely gone. For this reason, Guerra desired to honored and remember then explaining, "We only have a few stories and words left of them, in addition to the areitos, which are songs and dances. With these areitos we wanted to reconstruct the legacy of the Taínos".

== Production and music styles ==
According to Guerra, Areito was his most mature album at the time and stated "Not only musically, but also includes a very clear social critique". "El Costo De La Vida" has a musical composition of the merengue with elements zairian soukous of Africa with the collaboration of Don Diabla. The album-opening and closing folkloric odes to Taino culture ("Areito", "Naboria/Daca Mayaní Macaná"). Also, the album features a wide range of Latin music styles, among them merengue "Rompiendo Fuente", mambo ("Señales de Humo"), salsa ("Ayer", "Si Saliera Petroleo"), bachata ("Frío Frío"), cumbia ("Mal de Amor"), cha-cha ("Coronito de Flores"), and balada ("Cuando Te Beso"),

== Critical reception ==
Professional ratings
Review scores
Source	Rating
AllMusic	4.5/5 stars
Chicago Tribune	4/4 stars
Boston Globe	(Positive)
Sun Sentinel	Positive
Rolling Stone	2.5/5 stars
The Baltimore Sun	5/5 stars
La Opinión	(Positive)

The album was met with critical acclaim from music critics. Enrique Lopetegui from Achy Obejas from the Chicago Tribune gave it for 4 out 4 stars and praised the album's lyrics and wrote "Songs on Guerra's latest release, Areíto bemoan the rising cost of living in the Dominican Republic and throughout the Third World". The newspaper Sun Sentinel gave a positive review titled "Guerra Enhances His Status", praising the political views contained on the album and wrote "Bachata Rosa established Guerra as one of the pre-eminent singer/ songwriters, as recognized by Hispanics and non-Hispanics alike. Areito, however, has demonstrated that Guerra is becoming one of the very few commercially successful Latino artists willing to air uncensored views about the politics of life." On the same way, Larry Birnbaum from Newsday stated "It's all a bit over-refined, but "Areito" is just too delectable to resist".

Jason Birchmeier from AllMusic wrote "It's an otherwise magnificent album that, along with its two predecessors, is one of Guerra's classics". Billboard also praised the record calling it "[Guerra's] most wide-ranging, satisfying effort to date." Los Angeles Times gave a positive review and wrote "Areito, is less spectacular than 'Bachata Rosa,' but no less ambitious". J.D. Considine from The Baltimore Sun gave to the album 5 out 5 starts and wrote "Areito" is, indeed, a milestone of sorts for merengue". In the same hand, the newspaper La Opinión gave a positive review to the album and stated "It is a revealing work by a mature artist, very conscious and who has an immense future ahead of him."

Fernando Gonzales from Boston Globe gave a positive review and highlights the tracks "Frio Frio" and "Señales de Humo". However, in the same review stated "Guerra is still the class of the field-but, artistically, "Areito" is only a small step forward". On a less positive tone, Daisann Mclane from Rolling Stone gave a mixed review to the album and gave it 2.5 stars of 5. However, on the same review he stated "Areito remains a cautions sequel, but Guerra is so talented that even his holding patterns often make for worthwhile listening".

Areito was ranked the best Latin album of 1993 by the Houston Chronicle. The Austin American-Statesman also placed it at number one on its list of the top 10 Latin albums of 1993, calling it "another compelling masterpiece powered by its captivating rhythmic energy and urgent, thought-provoking lyrics." In 2023, ACROARTE included the album on its list of the 100 essential albums of Dominican music.

== Commercial reception ==
=== Album ===
Areíto was well received by the music industry, although the Austin American-Statesman noted that it was overshadowed by the blockbuster success of Guerra's previous album, Bachata Rosa. The album had one of the largest initial shipments ever for a Spanish-language release, with 400,000 units shipped in the United States and two million worldwide. In the United States, Guerra was named top selling tropical/salsa Latin artist of 1993 and Areíto the second best selling tropical/salsa Latin album of 1993. Areíto was also a commercial success in Latin America and was certified Gold and Platinum in Argentina, Colombia, Chile, Mexico and Spain In Colombia, Areíto sold over 40,000 as of 25 February 1993, including 10,000 CDs. In Uruguay, the album peaked at number 3 on the weekly album charts and sold 60,000 copies in Argentina. In Venezuela, the album was certified double platinum selling over 128,000 copies and 500,000 copies between United States and Puerto Rico of July 1993.

In Spain, despite the high expectations, the album peaked at number two. It eventually sold over 360,000 copies and was the 7th best selling album of 1993 in Spain and 5th best selling album by a foreign artist. In Mexico, Areito sold 125,000 copies and was certified Gold. Guerra performed over 20 shows in Spain during the Areíto tour, making a comeback to the top 10 due to album sales surge.

By 1993, the album had sold 1,500,000 copies worldwide, eventually selling 2 million copies worldwide.

However, sales figures from Areíto were significantly less in comparison to Bachata Rosa. Some attributed that one of the reasons was because Areíto did not have the same formula of mixed rhythms that caused his predecessor reached new audiences and universal acclaim. Instead, the album musical structure was based more on traditional bachata, merengue and bolero, causing some disappointment to the most recent fans at the time.

=== Singles ===
"Frio Frio" was the first single released from the album. It peaked at number four on the Billboard Hot Latin Songs chart and number five in Uruguay.

"Señales de Humo" was the second single released from the album. It reached number six on the Hot Latin Songs chart, number nine in Peru, number one in Venezuela, number eight in Mexico, number eight in Chile and number seven in Dominican Republic.

"El costo de la vida" was the third single and was released from the album shortly after being released. Despite the controversy, it was his first number one Billboard Hot Latin Songs, number 7 in Chile and peaked at number two in Venezuela.

The fourth single "Coronita de Flores" peaked at seven in Uruguay and five in Chile and two in Venezuela. It won a BMI Latin Award in 1995.

The fifth single "Mal de Amor" peaked at number five in Venezuela.

The sixth single "Rompiendo Fuente" peaked at 10 in Dominican Republic.

The seventh single "Cuanto Te Beso" reached number five in Chile.

== Track listing ==
All tracks are written by Juan Luis Guerra.

No.	Title	Length
1.	"Areíto"	1:19
2.	"El Costo de la Vida"	4:10
3.	"Señales de Humo"	5:32
4.	"Ayer"	5:05
5.	"Frío Frío"	4:08
6.	"Rompiendo Fuente"	4:26
7.	"Mal de Amor"	3:46
8.	"Si Saliera Petróleo"	4:35
9.	"Coronita de Flores"	4:17
10.	"Cuando Te Beso"	3:28
11.	"Cuando Te Beso (Bonus Track)"	3:08
12.	"Naboria/Daca Mayanimacaná"	2:25
Total length:		46:19

== Personnel ==
The following credits are from AllMusic and from the Areito liner notes:

Juan Luis Guerra y 440

- Juan Luis Guerra – vocals, guitar
- Daniel Pena – saxophone
- Luis Aquino – trumpet
- Roberto Olea – trombone
- Elvis Cabrera – piano, synthesizer
- Marco Hernandez – synthesizer
- Osvaldo Cesa – bass
- Roger Zayas – drums
- Johnny Chocolate - Tamboura
- Pedro Peralta – congas
- Rafael Guzman – güira
- Isidro Bobadilla – percussion
- Adalgisa Pantaleon – vocals
- Yaninna Rosado - Piano

Additional personnel

- The American Boy – Vocals
- Juan Colon - Sax (Alto), Sax (Tenor)
- Diablo Dibala - Composer
- Guy Frometa - Drums
- Jose Amable Frometa - Engineer
- Jorge Gonzales - Bongos, Maracas
- Manuel Tejada – piano, synthesizer
- Giovanni Hidalgo - Congas
- Ralph Irizarry - Timbales
- Asier Leatxe - Assistant Engineer, Mixing Assistant
- Allan Leschhorn - Assistant Engineer
- José Antonio Molina - Arranger
- Eddie Montalvo - Congas
- Pedro Tene Peralta - Congas
- Ed Rack - Engineer, Mixing
- Elena Ramírez - Photography
- Bienvenido Rodriguez - Executive Producer
- Luis Rodriguez - Triangle
- Hector Santana - Bass
- Kim Stanley - Art Direction, Photography
- Eric Taveras - Assistant Engineer
- Jorge Taveras - Assistant Engineer, Piano
- Tuto Taveras - Drums (Bass), Synthesizer
- Eugenio Vanderhorst - Musicologist
- Antonio Vazquez - Trombone
- Sammy Velasquez - Engineer, Mixing
- Michael Vinas - Bas

== Charts ==
=== Weekly charts ===
Weekly chart performance for Areíto
Chart (1993)	Peak
Dutch Albums (Album Top 100)	67
European Top 100 Albums (Music & Media)	40
Spanish Albums (AFYVE)	2
US Top Latin Albums (Billboard)	9
US Tropical Albums (Billboard)	2

=== Year-end charts ===
Year-end chart performance for Areíto
Chart (1993)	Rank
Spanish Albums (AFYVE)	7
US Tropical Albums (Billboard)	3

== Certifications and sales ==
Certifications and sales for Areíto
Region	Certification	Certified units/sales
Argentina (CAPIF)	2× Gold	60,000^{^}
Colombia	Gold	40,000
Mexico (AMPROFON)	Gold	125,000
Spain (Promusicae)	3× Platinum	360,000
United States	—	400,000
Venezuela	2× Platinum	
Summaries
Worldwide	—	2,000,000
^{^} Shipments figures based on certification alone.
