= Kōhachiro Miyata =

Shakuhachi player and composer

Kōhachirō Miyata (born 1938) 宮田 耕八朗 is a shakuhachi flautist and composer. He performs both traditional and contemporary music. He recorded with Ensemble Nipponia in the United States in 1976. Among his students were Clive Bell, Fukuda Teruhisa, Larry Tyrrell, and Rodrigo Rodriguez. His recordings have been published by Nonesuch Records, JVC, and King Records.

== Discography ==
- Shakuhachi: The Japanese Flute. Explorer Series. Electra Nonesuch 1977.
