= Symphony Orchestra of India =

Symphony orchestra in Mumbai, India

Symphony Orchestra of India (SOI)
- Orchestra
- Official logo
- Founded: 2006
- Location: National Centre for the Performing Arts (NCPA), Mumbai, India
- Music director: Martyn Brabbins
- Website: www.soimumbai.com

The Symphony Orchestra of India is a symphony orchestra based in Mumbai, India. It was founded in 2006 by the National Centre for the Performing Arts (NCPA), Mumbai, which is also its home.

The founding Music Director is Marat Bisengaliev. Zane Dalal is the Associate Music Director. Evgeny Bushkov is the current Resident Conductor.

The orchestra's season includes not only works from the symphonic repertoire but also opera, ballet and chamber music performances.

== About the Orchestra ==
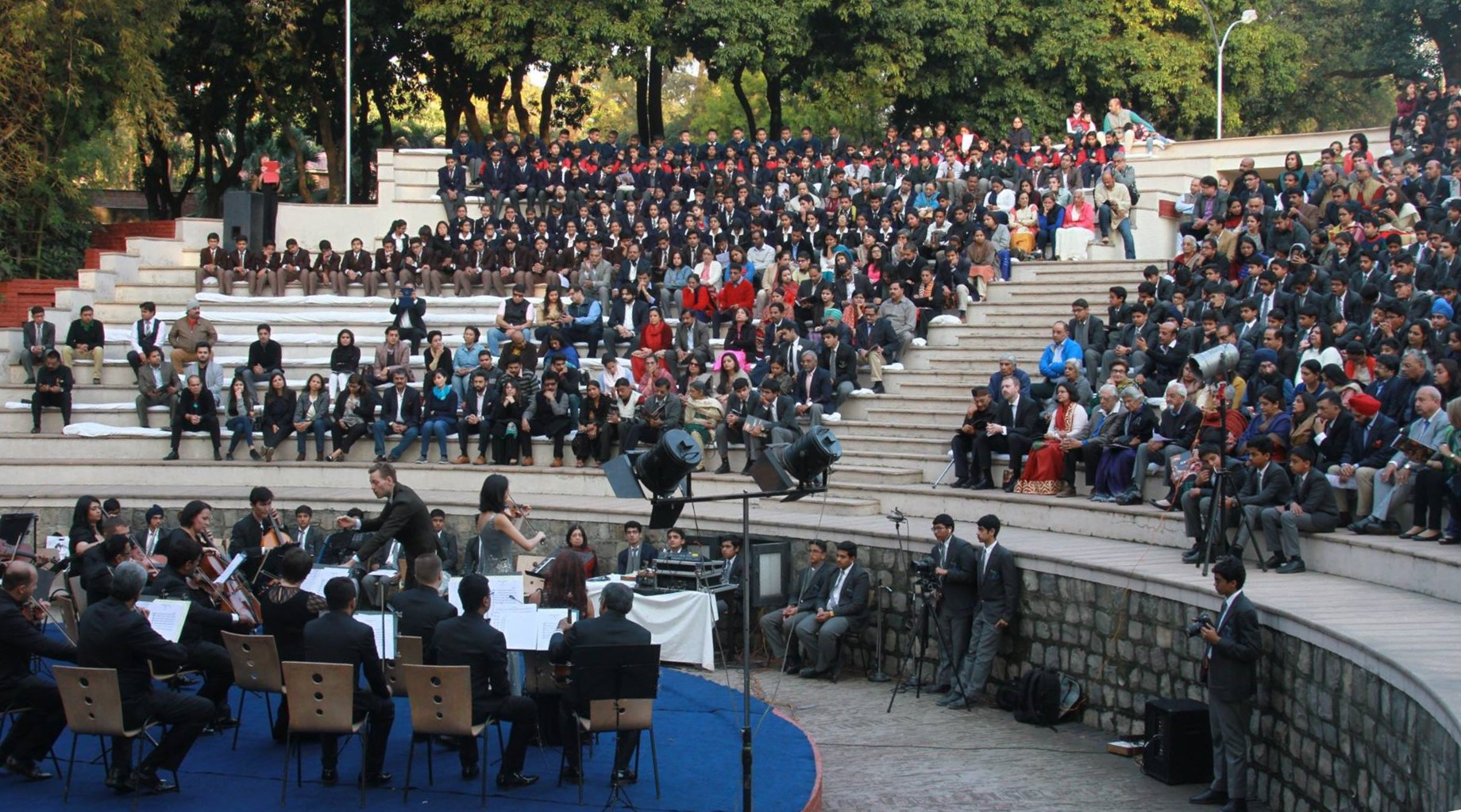
Symphony Orchestra of India's chamber ensemble, along with the British conductor Robert Ames and violinist Galya Bisengalieva, performing in the open-air theatre at The Doon School, Dehradun in February 2017.

The Symphony Orchestra of India (SOI), based at the National Centre for the Performing Arts (NCPA), Mumbai, is India's first and only professional orchestra according to its own website. It was founded in 2006 by NCPA Chairman Khushroo N. Suntook and violinist Marat Bisengaliev, who serves as the Orchestra's Music Director. Zane Dalal was appointed Associate Music Director of the SOI in September 2014, following serving seven years as Resident Conductor. Evgeny Bushkov serves as the Resident Conductor, taking up the role in January 2017.

The SOI has worked with renowned conductors including Charles Dutoit, Martyn Brabbins, Carlo Rizzi, Augustin Dumay, Yuri Simonov, Lior Shambadal, Rafael Payare, Adrian Leaper, Johannes Wildner, Evgeny Bushkov, Duncan Ward, Karl Jenkins, Mischa Damev, Alexander Anisimov, and Christoph Poppen, and more. Soloists appearing with the SOI have included Maria João Pires, Augustin Dumay, Simon O'Neill, Cédric Tiberghien, Alina Ibragimova, Barry Douglas, Angel Blue, Zakir Hussain, Edgar Meyer, Béla Fleck, Tamás Vásáry, and Lena Neudauer, amongst others.

In the decade since its inception, the Orchestra has performed around India and internationally. Tours have seen the SOI perform in the Hall of Columns, Moscow, and the Royal Opera House, Muscat. In the October 2015, the SOI opened the 2015-16 Abu Dhabi Classics season, performing at the Emirates Palace Auditorium, Abu Dhabi, and in January 2016, presented three concerts in Switzerland—at the Tonhalle, Zurich; Victoria Hall, Geneva; and the Tonhalle, St. Gallen—on invitation from the Migros Kulturprozent Classics series. Apart from the mainstays of the symphonic repertoire, the NCPA and SOI have also presented large-scale productions, including fully staged operas—with productions of Tosca, Madama Butterfly, and Cavalleria rusticana/Pagliacci. In 2017, the SOI premiered a new production of La Bohème, conducted by Carlo Rizzi.

The Orchestra's core group of musicians is resident at the NCPA all year round and forms the SOI Chamber Orchestra, which performs a regular series of concerts through the year.

== Guest Conductors ==
List of guest conductors who have conducted the Symphony Orchestra of India:

1. Adrian Leaper
2. Alexander Anisimov
3. Augustin Dumay
4. Charles Dutoit
5. Christoph Poppen
6. Duncan Ward
7. Evgeny Bushkov
8. Johannes Wildner
9. Karl Jenkins
10. Lior Shambadal
11. Mischa Damev
12. Martyn Brabbins
13. Rafael Payare
14. Yuri Simonov

== Guest Artistes ==
1. Alina Ibragimova, violin
2. Angel Blue, soprano
3. Augustin Dumay, violin
4. Barry Douglas, piano
5. Béla Fleck, banjo
6. Cédric Tiberghien, piano
7. Edgar Meyer, double bass
8. Lena Neudauer, violin
9. Maria João Pires, piano
10. Simon O'Neill, tenor
11. Stephen Kovacevich, piano
12. Tamás Vásáry, piano
13. Zakir Hussain, tabla

== International touring ==
- Moscow: June 2010
- Muscat: February 2013
- Abu Dhabi: October 2015
- Switzerland: January 2016

== Music Directors ==
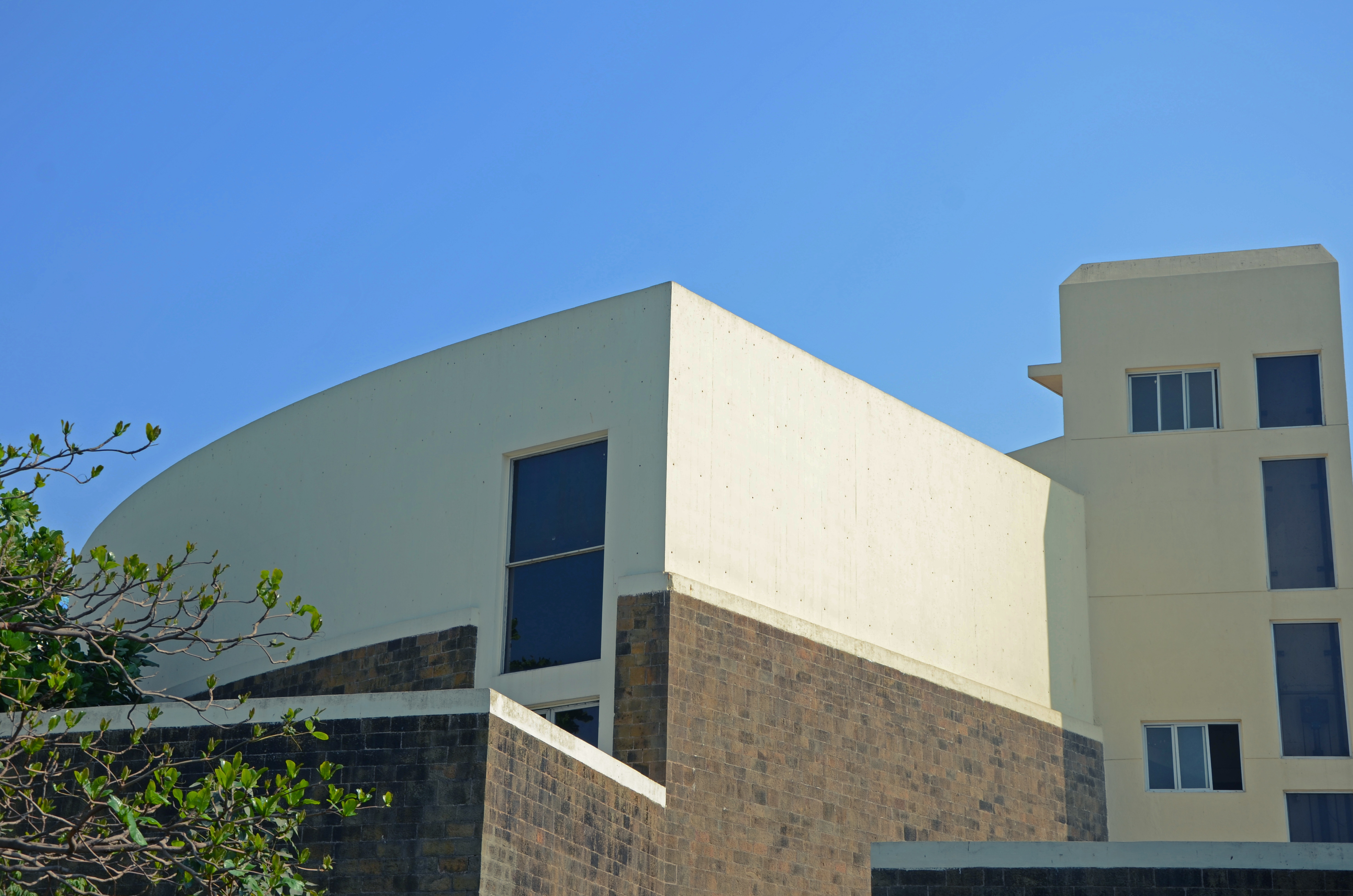
NCPA building, Nariman Point, Mumbai, home of SOI

- Marat Bisengaliev (2006 – 2025)
- Martyn Brabbins (2026 – present)

== NCPA Special Music Training Programme ==
The NCPA Special Music Training Programme was launched in 2012, to offer an advanced level of music training, previously not available in India, to talented young children. Under the supervision of SOI Music Director Marat Bisengaliev, the students receive a holistic music education that is inspired by the Russian Conservatoire method. This includes substantial one-to-one tuition on the student’s primary instrument, as well as second-study piano lessons, music history, music theory, and group-singing teaching via the Solfeggio method. The Programme currently offers lessons on all the string instruments, select woodwind and brass instruments, piano, and percussion, with plans to expand the offerings in the near future. The tutors of the Programme are all professional musicians trained in Europe and the United States and are all full-time members of the Symphony Orchestra of India. Amongst other performance opportunities, each year the NCPA presents a special concert featuring students of the Programme performing with members of the Symphony Orchestra of India. This offers the students the rare opportunity to perform as a soloist with a professional orchestra, as well as training in orchestral playing. In March 2018, students of the NCPA Special Music Training Programme embarked on their first international tour, performing two concerts in Abu Dhabi.

== Press Coverage ==
Pitch Perfect I 11 July 2014 I DNA
India’s Only Symphony Orchestra I 20 Sept 2012 Huffington Post
