= Lacrimosa (Juan Luis Guerra song) =

Promotional single by Juan Luis Guerra

from the album Fogaraté
- B-side: "Los Pajaritos"
- Released: 1995
- Recorded: 1994
- Studio: 440 Studio; (New York, New York)
- Genre: Bachata
- Length: 3:20
- Label: Karen Records
- Songwriter: Juan Luis Guerra

"Lacrimosa" (Weeping) is a song recorded by Dominican singer Juan Luis Guerra for his seventh studio album, Fogarate (1994), included as its seventh track. It was released to radio stations in Europe in 1994 and the United States in 1995 by Karen Records as a promotional single, following "Los Pajaritos". The track is a bachata that attempts an interpretation of Mozart's Requiem.

== Track listing ==
- Europe CD-single (1994)
  1. Lacrimosa – 3:20
  2. Los Parajitos – 4:02

== Charts ==
Chart (1995)	Peak position
US Contemporary Pop (Cashbox)	17
