= Sylvia Hallett =

English musician and composer

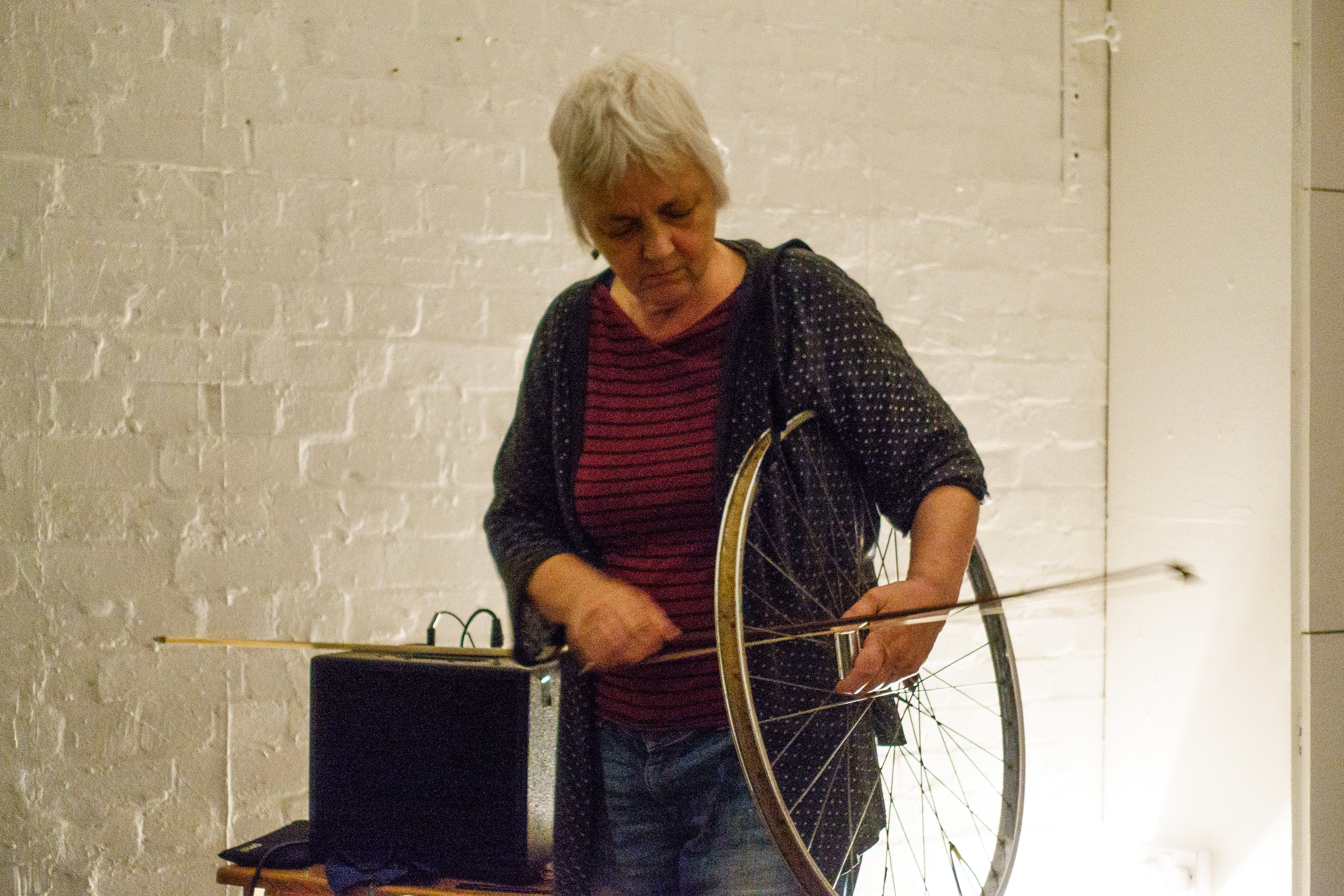
- Sylvia Hallett in 2018
- Education: Dartington College of Arts
- Occupations: Violinist; Composer; Improvisor; Musician

Sylvia Hallett (born 1953) is an English musician and composer. She plays many instruments including the violin and she is known for improvisations on unusual instruments. She has appeared at international festivals, often in collaboration with theatres and dance companies.

== Career ==
Hallett studied music at the Dartington College of Arts. She continued her studies in Paris with Max Deutsch.

Hallett's instruments have included Norwegian Hardanger fiddle, saw, accordion, found objects such as a bicycle wheel, at times modified by electronics. From the early 1970s, she has appeared at international festivals. She has performed solo and as a duo with Clive Bell (musician). She has also collaborated with artists such as Lol Coxhill, Phil Minton, Maggie Nicols, Evan Parker, and with theatres and dance projects. In 2012 she played in David Toop's "atmospheric opera" Star-shaped Biscuit.

Hallett made several solo recordings, which include improvisations, songs and "tape collage pieces" from her works for the stage. For her recording White Fog, she bowed a bicycle wheel. A review describes "plaintive sounds" of the wheel spokes, expanded to "soundscapes" by digital delay boxes. A second piece on the recording is The Onyx Rook, an improvisation for violin and voice, the third Snail and Curlew, a collage of sounds of "water, bird, and vocal sounds". Hallett made a duo recording Geographers with Clive Bell in 2005. Martin Longley comments that while Bell plays mainly reed and pipe instruments from places such as South East Asia, Hallett included a saw, a bicycle wheel mounted on a spindle, and the viola, on most improvisations modified by electronics. The reviewer describes an atmosphere of "suspended meditation, sustained for over an hour with some extremely varied and resourceful spontaneity", with the sound of the bicycle wheel "uncannily similar to her viola or sarangi, but just a touch rougher".
