= Mal de Amor =

Single by Juan Luis Guerra

from the album Areito
- B-side: "Naboira/Daca Mayanimacana"
- Released: 1993
- Recorded: 1992
- Genre: Merengue; Cumbia
- Length: 3:46
- Label: Karem Records
- Songwriter: Juan Luis Guerra

Juan Luis Guerra singles chronology
"El Costo de la Vida" (1992)	"Mal de Amor" (1993)	"Coronita de Flores" (1993)

"Mal de Amor" (Lovesickness) is the fourth single from Juan Luis Guerra's sixth studio album Areíto, released in 1993 by Karem Records. The melody is by Nemous Jean Baptiste the Haitian compositor in 1960 the song was written and produced by Guerra. The track encompasses traditional merengue with Cumbia. The song was the fourth consecutive single from the album to reach the top-ten on the Billboard Hot Latin Songs chart in the United States. It also reached the top-ten in Venezuela.

== Track listing ==
- Spain CD-single (1993)
  1. Mal de Amor - 3:46
  2. Naboria/Daca Mayanimacana - 2:25

== Charts ==
Chart (1993)	Peak position
US Hot Latin Songs (Billboard)	4
Venezuela (UPI)	5
