= Requiem (Jenkins) =

Classical work by Karl Jenkins

- by Karl Jenkins
- Text: Requiem; Japanese poetry
- Language: Latin; Japanese
- Composed: 2005
- Performed: 2 June 2005
- Scoring: soprano; treble; harp; orchestra

Requiem is a classical work by Karl Jenkins, first recorded and performed in 2005. It was premièred at Southwark Cathedral on 2 June 2005, by massed choirs, the West Kazakhstan Philharmonic Orchestra, and Adiemus percussion and brass, conducted by the composer. Soloists were Nicole Tibbels (soprano), Clive Bell (shakuhachi), Sam Landman (treble) and Catrin Finch (harp).

In this work, Jenkins interjects movements featuring Japanese death poems in the form of a haiku with those traditionally encountered in a Requiem Mass. At times, the Latin text is sung below the text of the haiku, sung in Japanese. Oriental instruments are included in the orchestration, such as the shakuhachi, the darabuca, daiko and frame drums.

The work was released in a 2005 album of the same name.

== Album ==
Requiem

Studio album by Karl Jenkins
- Released: 2005
- Recorded: Angel 2005
- Genre: Classical
- Length: 70:51
- Label: EMI
- Producer: Karl Jenkins

Karl Jenkins chronology
Adiemus V: Vocalise (2003)	Requiem (2005)	Stabat Mater (2008)

Requiem was included on Jenkins's 2005 album of the same name, along with his work In These Stones Horizons Sing, which was written for the opening ceremony of the Wales Millennium Centre in Cardiff. Contributors to the album included the West Kazakhstan Philharmonic Orchestra, Clive Bell on shakuhachi, Marat Bisengaliev as solo violinist, Catrin Finch on harp, and Nigel Hitchcock on soprano saxophone.

=== Album track listing ===
Requiem

1. "Introit" – 6:49
2. "Dies Irae" – 4:41
3. "The Snow of Yesterday" – 3:15
4. "Rex Tremendae" – 3:10
5. "Confutatis" – 2:56
6. "From Deep in My Heart" – 2:38
7. "Lacrimosa" – 4:51
8. "Now as a Spirit" – 4:01
9. "Pie Jesu" – 4:36
10. "Having Seen the Moon" – 4:19
11. "Lux Aeterna" – 3:27
12. "Farewell" – 4:05
13. "In Paradisum" – 5:37
  In These Stones Horizons Sing
14. "Agorawd Part I: Cân yr Alltud" – 2:34
15. "Agorawd Part II: Nawr!" – 2:41
16. "Grey" – 4:50
17. "Eleni Ganed" – 2:01
18. "In These Stones Horizons Sing" – 4:32

== Selected international performances ==
Jenkins's Requiem has been performed internationally by professional, community and festival ensembles. Selected documented performances include:

Selected performances by country
Year	Country	Orchestra / choir / ensemble	Conductor
2005	United Kingdom	Massed choirs, West Kazakhstan Philharmonic Orchestra, Adiemus percussion and brass	Karl Jenkins
2007	United States	Connecticut Master Chorale and Connecticut Master Chorale Orchestra	Tina Johns Heidrich
2011	Poland	Chór Politechniki Białostockiej and a chamber orchestra of musicians from Opera i Filharmonia Podlaska	Wioletta Miłkowska
2015	Australia	Choir and orchestra at St Mary's Cathedral, Perth	Jangoo Chapkhana
2023	Bulgaria	Sofia Philharmonic Orchestra and National Philharmonic Choir	Nayden Todorov
2023	Germany	Chor Capriccio and Thüringen Philharmonie Gotha-Eisenach	Jonathan Griffith
