= Cuando Te Beso =

Single by Juan Luis Guerra

from the album Areito
- Released: 1994
- Recorded: 1992
- Genre: Ballad
- Length: 3:28
- Label: Karem Records

Juan Luis Guerra singles chronology
"Rompiendo Fuente" (1993)	"Cuando Te Beso" (1994)	"La Cosquillita" (1994)

Cuando Te Beso (English: When I kiss you) is the seventh and final single of Juan Luis Guerra sixth studio album Areito, released on 1993 in Europe and in January 1994 in the United States by Karem Records. The album also contained other version of the track performed by the Santo Domingo Philharmonic Orchestra. The song peaked at number 28 on the US Hot Latin Songs and reached the top-ten in Chile and Panama. The track receive positive reviews by the critics. Ramiro Burr from Austin American Statesman stated that track is "an affecting tale of devotion". Robert Hilburn from Los Angeles Times wrote that the track had percussion "had some wonderfully affecting ballad work".

== Tracklist ==
- Spain CD-Single (1993)
  1. Cuando Te Beso – 3:28
  2. Cuando Te Beso (Directo Cascais '93) – 4:24

== Charts ==
Chart (1993–94)	Peak position
Chile (IFPI)	5
Panama (UPI)	8
US Hot Latin Songs (Billboard)	28
