= Clive Bell (musician) =

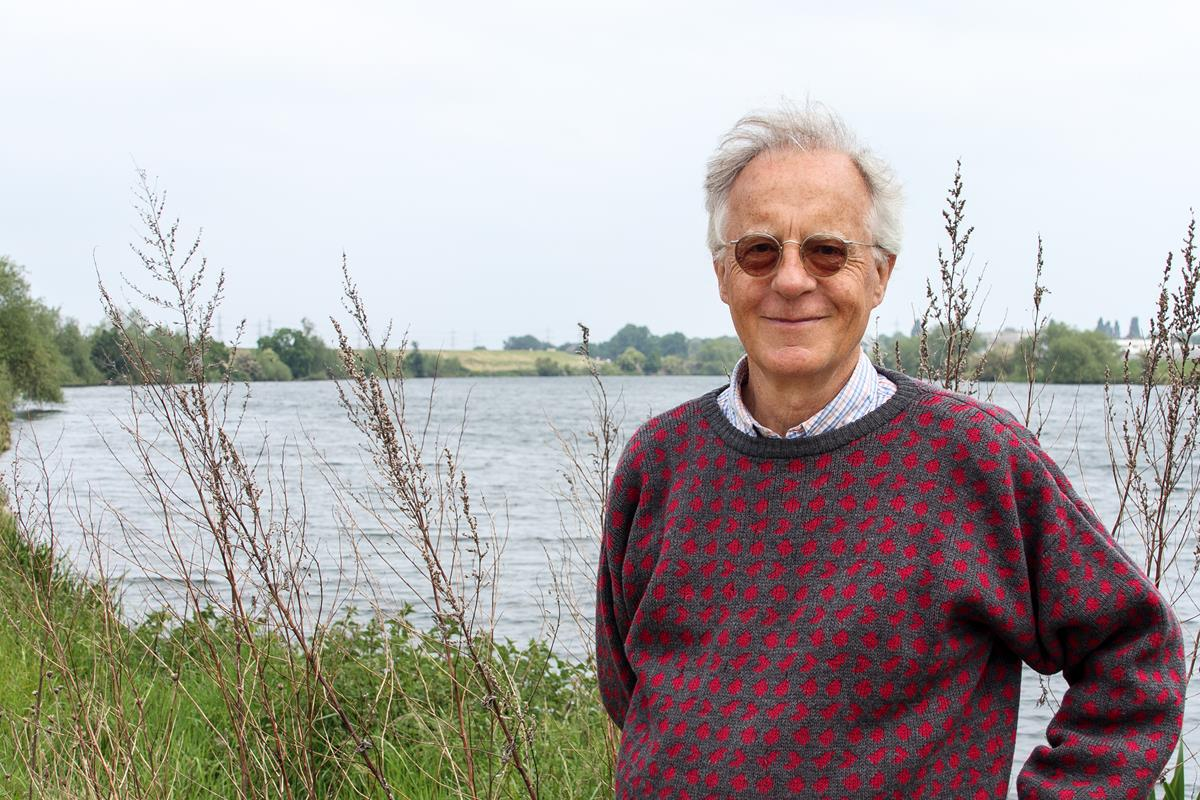
- Clive Bell in front of a lake

Background information
- Born: February 1950 (age 76); London, England
- Origin: London, England
- Occupations: Musician, composer
- Instruments: Shakuhachi, khene, other flutes
- Years active: 1970s–present
- Labels: Another Timbre, ARC, EMI

Clive Bell (born 1950) is a British musician, composer and music journalist specialising in the shakuhachi (Japanese bamboo flute), khene (Lao mouth-organ) and other Asian wind instruments.

Based in London, he is internationally recognised for his film and video game soundtrack work, including Harry Potter and the Deathly Hallows Parts 1 and 2, The Hobbit trilogy, and Ghost of Tsushima.

Bell is an improviser, collaborating with leading figures in experimental and avant-garde music, and writes regularly for The Wire magazine.

== Early life and training ==
Bell studied shakuhachi in Tokyo for two years with the master Kohachiro Miyata (1924–2014), one of the most respected shakuhachi performers and composers of the 20th century. He also received instruction from Yamaguchi Gorō (1933–1999), a Living National Treasure and one of Japan's most revered shakuhachi masters, as well as Okamoto Chikugai (1915–2000) and Fujii Kunie.

Bell has travelled extensively in Japan, Thailand, Laos and Bali, researching music and meeting local practitioners. In addition to shakuhachi, he studied the khene (a Lao/Thai bamboo mouth-organ) in Laos and Thailand.

Bell's shakuhachi playing has been featured in live sessions on BBC Radio 3's Late Junction and In Tune.

== Career ==
=== Film and television soundtracks ===
Bell has performed shakuhachi on numerous high-profile film soundtracks, working with leading composers including Alexandre Desplat and Howard Shore.

He performed shakuhachi on both parts of Harry Potter and the Deathly Hallows (2010–2011), scored by Alexandre Desplat. Both soundtracks were recorded at Abbey Road Studios.

Bell also performed shakuhachi on The Hobbit trilogy (2012–2014), scored by Howard Shore.

=== Video game soundtracks ===
Bell recorded shakuhachi and shinobue (high-pitched bamboo flute) for the blockbuster video game Ghost of Tsushima (2020), developed by Sucker Punch Productions for PlayStation 4. The score was composed by Ilan Eshkeri and Shigeru Umebayashi and Bell recorded at multiple prestigious London studios including Abbey Road Studios, AIR Studios and RAK Studios.

Bell has also contributed shakuhachi to video game soundtracks for The Sims series.

=== Improvisation and experimental music ===
Bell is an active improviser and has collaborated with numerous leading figures in experimental and avant-garde music, including:

- Fred Frith
- Jah Wobble
- David Sylvian
- Steve Beresford
- David Toop
- Jochen Irmler (Faust)
- Paul Schütze
- Bill Laswell
- Kazuko Hohki

Bell regularly performs in duos and trios with musicians including David Ross, Sylvia Hallett, Mike Adcock and Peter Cusack.

=== Journalism ===
Bell writes regularly for The Wire, a monthly music magazine covering experimental, avant-garde and non-mainstream music. His articles include features on shakuhachi players and analysis of the instrument's role in contemporary music contexts and is currently on the board of the European Shakuhachi Society as Publications Officer for BAMBOO Magazine.

== Discography ==
=== Solo albums ===
- Kurokami (1988)
- Shakuhachi: The Japanese Flute (ARC Music, 1994; reissued 2005)
- Asakusa Follies (Cusp Editions, 2017)
- Shakuhachi for Latin Lovers (2020)

=== Duo and collaborative albums ===
- Sleep It Off (2002) – with Mike Adcock
- The Geographers (2005) – with Sylvia Hallett
- Mystery Lights & Nightflower (2005) – with David Ross
- An Account of My Hut: Improvisations for Shakuhachi and Ney (Another Timbre, 2007) – with Bechir Saade
- Acoustic Dream (2008)
- Tales of Hackney (2019) – with Arild Andersen and Mark Wastell
- Betamax vs Clive Bell – with Maxwell Hallet (2021)
- Minor Planets (2021) – completing a trilogy of cosmically themed electro-acoustic albums

Bell also performed the premiere of Karl Jenkins' Requiem in 2005 in Southwark Cathedral and features on the EMI recording of the composition.

== Other work ==
=== British Council Beijing project ===
In 2005, Bell participated in the British Council's "Sound & The City" project in Beijing, collaborating with Brian Eno, David Toop and Peter Cusack.

=== Live soundtracks ===
In September 2013, Bell and Sylvia Hallett performed a live soundtrack at the BFI for Yasujirō Ozu's 1930 comedy gangster film Walk Cheerfully.

=== Touring ===
Bell toured for over a decade with Jah Wobble, including performances at Ronnie Scott's Jazz Club and the Glastonbury Festival. He has also toured with UK-based Japanese drumming group Taiko Meantime, and performs with koto and shamisen players in the Japanese classical repertoire.

== See also ==
- Shakuhachi
- Kohachiro Miyata
- Honkyoku
- Sankyoku
- Traditional Japanese music
- The Wire (magazine)
