= Joglaresa =

London-based medieval and folk band

- Origin: London, England
- Genres: Medieval, traditional
- Years active: 1992–present
- Labels: Avie; Metronome; Village Life; Ethnomusic Records
- Members: Jeremy Avis; Angela Hicks; Cerian Holland; Victoria Couper; Elisabeth Flett; Louise Anna Duggan; Jordan Murray; Guy Schalom; Jonny Akerman; Elsa Bradley
- Past members: Belinda Sykes; Paul Clarvis; Ben Davis; Tim Garside; Stuart Hall; Jennie Cassidy
- Website: www.joglaresa.com

Joglaresa is a London-based medieval and folk band, known for their scholarly and imaginative re-creation of medieval music. Founded in 1992 by director Belinda Sykes, their music spans a range of European, Middle Eastern and North African medieval and folk genres, drawing especially on Arabic, Sephardic and Andalusian traditions. They are also notable for their innovative programming and use of improvisation.

They have been featured artists in national radio concert broadcasts on BBC Radio 3 and BBC Radio Jersey.

The name Joglaresa refers to the female troubadours of the middle ages – Sykes' vision was of a largely female band, although it was mostly male in the early years.

== Members ==
=== Belinda Sykes ===
Singer and multi-instrumentalist Belinda Sykes (1966 – 16 November 2021) was founder and director of Joglaresa. She fell in love with the oboe at the age of six, by mistake, while listening to the cor anglais solo in the New World Symphony. She was also immersed in English folk music from a very early age, when her parents would take her to folk clubs and dances, where her father was a caller. Sykes went on to study oboe and recorder at Guildhall School of Music and Drama, obtained a Masters in Arab-Andalusian music from SOAS University of London and learned about various ethnic musical styles during field trips to Bulgaria and Hungary, and travels to Morocco, India, Syria and Spain.

In 2004 Sykes was solo oboist playing Harrison Birtwistle's music in a production of Euripides' Bacchae at the Royal National Theatre. In 2004 Sykes also performed and recorded as part of the female ensemble Mille Fleurs. In 2008 she sang and played ney for the world premiere of Karl Jenkins' Stabat Mater. Jenkins composed the Incantation section of this piece with Sykes' voice in mind. In 2011 Sykes was appointed professor of medieval song at Trinity Laban Conservatoire of Music and Dance. In 2015 Sykes sang and acted in another production of Bakkhai, alongside Ben Wishaw at London's Almeida Theatre. In 2019, Sykes' "breathtaking" knowledge of the music and culture of Al-Andalus led to her presenting a special edition of the BBC's Early Music Show on the subject.

Sykes was diagnosed with terminal cancer in 2019. She died on 16 November 2021, at the age of 55.

== Discography ==
Year	Album	Label	Reviews
Ballads of Love & Betrayal : Sephardic Songs of the Mediterranean	2001	Village Life	
Magdalena : Medieval Songs for Mary Magdalen	2003	Avie	5/5 stars
Stella Nuova : Celebratory Songs of Medieval Italy	2005	Joglaresa	
Douce Dame Debonaire : Medieval French Song	2008	Joglaresa	
Dancing in Tetuán : Sephardic Song	2009	Joglaresa	4/5 stars
Dreams of Andalusia : Jewish, Arabic & Christian Songs of Medieval Spain	2009	Metronome	4.5/5 stars
In Hoary Winter's Night : Irish & English Songs of Wintertide	2009	Joglaresa	
Nuns & Roses : Medieval Songs of Sin & Subversion	2012	Joglaresa	
Magna Carta : 800 years of rebels & royals	2015	Joglaresa	
Sing We Yule : Folk & Medieval Songs for Yuletide	2017	Joglaresa	
Live at St Barts : Folk & Medieval Songs for Yuletide	2019	Joglaresa	
Boogie Knights : Lockdown Plague Party	2021	Joglaresa	
