= El Beso de la Ciguatera =

"El Beso de la Ciguaterra"

Single by Juan Luis Guerra

from the album Fogaraté
- B-side: "El Beso De La Ciguatera (Maxi Version)"
- Released: January 23, 1995
- Recorded: 1993–94
- Length: 4:08
- Label: Karem Records

Juan Luis Guerra singles chronology
"Vivire" (1994)	"El Beso de la Ciguaterra" (1995)	"Mi PC" (1998)

El Beso de la Ciguatera (The Kiss of the Ciguatera) is a song by Dominican Republic singer-songwriter Juan Luis Guerra released as the third single for his album Fogarate (1994) with the collaboration of Diblo Dibala. The song was released on January 23, 1995, by Karen Records. The track encompasses merengue with soukus. The song was a recipient of a Broadcast Music, Inc. (BMI) Latin Award in 1996. Commercially, it reached the top ten on the Billboard Hot Latin Songs and Tropical Airplay charts in the United States. It also received moderate airplay in Europe.

== Tracklist ==
- Spain CD Single (1994)
  1. El Beso De La Ciguatera (Radio Version) – 4:10
  2. El Beso De La Ciguatera (Maxi Version) – 4:50

== Charts ==
Chart (1995)	Peak position
Europe Southwest Airplay (Music&Media)	13
Dominican Republic (UPI)	1
US Hot Latin Songs (Billboard)	17
US Tropical Airplay (Billboard)	6
US Tropical 25 (Cashbox)	1
US Latin Pop Songs (Billboard)	6
