= La Cosquillita =

Single by Juan Luis Guerra

from the album Fogaraté
- Released: June 21, 1994
- Recorded: 1994
- Genre: Merengue típico
- Length: 3:40
- Label: Karem Records

Juan Luis Guerra singles chronology
"Cuando Te Beso" (1994)	"La Cosquillita" (1994)	"Vivire" (1994)

Alternative cover

La Cosquillita ("The Little Tickle") is the lead single of the seventh studio album Fogarate! by dominican superstar Juan Luis Guerra. It was released on June 21, 1994 by Karen Records. The rural merengue (perico ripio) track was written and produced with the Dominican accordionist Francisco Ulloa and his band. About the success of the track, Guerra stated "With the `perico ripiao' we are doing the same thing that we did with the `bachata,' breaking down the barriers that prevent it from reaching all of Dominican society, and then exporting it". The song became Guerra's first number-one hit in his native Dominican Republic; and became a top-ten hit in Spain, Venezuela and the US Hot Latin Songs chart.

La Cosquillita receive positive reviews by the critics. The music video was ranked at number 4 on The Beat`s Top Ten World Best Music Video of 1994 list. The song was a recipient of a Broadcast Music, Inc. (BMI) Latin Award in 1996. It was included on Grandes Éxitos Juan Luis Guerra y 440.

== Tracklist ==
- US CD-Single (1994)
  1. La Cosquillita – 3:40
  2. El Farolito – 3:42
  3. Vivire – 4:00
- Spain 12", Maxi-Single, 45 RPM (1994)
  1. La Cosquillita – 3:40
  2. Oprobio – 2:48

== Charts ==
Chart (1994)	Peak position
Colombia (UPI)	2
Chile (UPI)	10
Dominican Republic (UPI)	1
Spain (AFYVE)	6
US Hot Latin Songs (Billboard)	6
Venezuela (UPI)	10
