= The Gazette (Memorial University) =

Canadian university newspaper

Gazette
- Type: Weekly newspaper
- Format: Broadsheet
- Owner: Memorial University of Newfoundland
- Editor: Dave Sorensen
- Founded: 1949
- Political alignment: None
- Headquarters: St. John's, Newfoundland
- Website: www.mun.ca/gazette

The Gazette is the official newspaper of Memorial University of Newfoundland, located in St. John's, Newfoundland.

== See also ==
- List of newspapers in Canada
