= Marat Bisengaliev =

Kazakhstani violinist (born 1962)

- Birth name: Marat Sämetūly Bisenğaliev
- Born: 1962; Almaty, Kazakhstan
- Genres: Classical
- Occupation(s): Violinist, conductor
- Instrument: Violin
- Website: http://www.maratbisengaliev.com

Marat Bisengaliev (Kazakh: Marat Sämetūly Bisenğaliev, born 1962 in Kazakhstan) is a Kazakh violinist and conductor of both the West Kazakhstan Philharmonic Orchestra and TuranAlem Kazakhstan Philharmonic Orchestra. He is the founding Music Director of the Symphony Orchestra of India. In addition, he is head of the Uralsk International Violin Competition. Most of the time he lives and works in the UK and India.

== Early life and education ==
Bisengaliev was born in Almaty. His father Samet came from Orda, western Kazakhstan and worked in Jalal-Abad, Kyrgyzstan before moving to Almaty to work in the Kalinin financial district. His mother Aruhan was a teacher from Astrakhan. Both parents did music as a hobby.

In 1969, Bisengaliev began training in violin at the K. Bayseitov Republican Secondary Special Music School, graduating in 1979. He attended the Kurmangazy Alma-Ata State Conservatoire from 1979 to 1981, and then pursued postgraduate studies at the Moscow Conservatory. He completed his studies in 1988 with a solo concert performing Beethoven's violin concerto at the Conservatory's Great Hall with the Russia State Academic Symphony Orchestra of the USSR.

== Career ==
In 1989, Bisengaliev created a chamber orchestra "Altyn-Alma" in Alma-Ata. That same year, he was invited to tour England. At one of the concerts, Marat performed the violin concerto by Jean Sibelius and received acclaim for his emotional emancipation and depth of interpretation. David Danton, a producer of the record company Naxos, offered Bisengaliev a contract that day for recording his concert repertoire. In the following years (1992–2008), Bisengaliev recorded fourteen compact discs with the Western record companies such as Naxos, Marco Polo, Sony, EMR – Classic, and Black Boxing.

Bisengaliev was a prize winner at the Leipzig International Bach Competition in 1988, and in 1991 won first prize at the International Nicanor Zabaleta Competition in Spain, also receiving the special virtuoso prize for the most outstanding performance of the competition.

In 1995, The New York Times says that Bisengaliev "has taken to heart a style of playing that was a hallmark of violin virtuosity early in the century".

For three years, Bisengaliev lived in the small English town of Malvern Hills, Worcestershire, where the famous English composer Edward Elgar (1857–1934) was born. He was invited there as a "musician in the residence" while also working as a scientist. He visited libraries and houses related to Elgar, collected all possible materials about him and recorded a complete anthology of his works. The first two discs of this album were recorded in 1999 and 2001. To this release, the violinist added a third disc, which he recorded with the West Kazakhstan Philharmonic Orchestra in 2010. He then released the full anthology of Elgar in his performance on the triple CD "Elgar / Elgar" in 2011. Bisengaliev has stated regards this as his most significant achievement.

In 2000, Bisengaliev received the Independent Platinum Tarlan Award and the Government Medal of Honour in Kazakhstan. In 2003, he founded the West Kazakhstan Philharmonic Orchestra.

In 2006, he became Artistic Director of the Symphony Orchestra of India, the first professional orchestra of its kind in India. In 2010, became member of Directors of AAPRO (Alliance of Asia Pacific Regions Orchestra).

In response to the Borat film, Bisengaliev commissioned a symphony called "Zere" from Erran Baron Cohen, the musical director of the movie (and brother of Borat star Sacha Baron Cohen).

Bisengaliev has given concerts in over 35 countries and performed with such famous orchestras as Northern Sinfonia, Moscow State Tchaikovsky Conservatory, Polish National Radio Symphony Orchestra, Warsaw Philharmonic Orchestra, National Symphony Orchestra of Ukraine. Marat performed in the most prestigious concert halls in the world: Carnegie Hall (New York City), Royal Albert Hall, Barbican Hall and Wigmore Hall (London), (Manchester), (Belfast), Great Hall of the Moscow Conservatory, and more.

== Personal life ==
In 1990, Bisengaliev moved to England and married British flutist Stina Wilson, a member of the Opera North orchestra in Leeds. They have a daughter Aruhan Galieva (b. 1991), who is now a performer herself as well as an environmentalist. The family lived in Otley. After divorcing Wilson, Bisengaliev remarried a Frenchwoman Vassilia. They have a daughter Shorai.

They live in the small town of Oxspring, South Yorkshire. He also has bases in Crete, Almaty, Uralsk, Bombay, and New Zealand.

== Discography ==
- 1992 – LALO, Symphonie espagnole (Lalo, Sarasate, Ravel, Saint-Saëns) with the Polish Symphony Orchestra, Naxos
- 1992 – WIENIAWSKI, Violin Showpieces (Henryk Wieniawski's violin sketches), Naxos
- 1993 – BRIAN CYRCLE (Concerto for Violin and Symphony No. 18 by Brian Havergal), Naxos / Marco Polo
- 1994 – BRAHMS / JOACHIM (Hungarian Brahms dances and Joachim's romances), Naxos
- 1995 – WIENIAWSKI (Concerts for Violin No. 1 and 2 by Henryk Wieniawski), Naxos
- 1996 – MENDELSSOHN (Two concerts by Felix Mendelssohn for violin and orchestra), Naxos
- 1998 – DUET (Mendelssohn's double concert for violinist and pianist with Jania Aubakirova in Barbican Hall, London).
- 1999 – ELGAR Rediscovered works for violin (Newly discovered works for violin by Edward Elgar), Black Box, (nomination for the Prize of Gramophone magazine, England)
- 1999 – BRAHMS (Three Brahms sonatas for piano and violin), Black Box
- 2001 – ELGAR Rediscovered works for violin, vol.2 (Newly discovered works for violin by Edward Elgar, volume 2), Black Box
- 2005 – A. RUBINSTEIN (Trio No. 3 by Anton Rubinstein for piano, cello, violin with orchestra, etc.), "Melody"
- 2005 – KARL JENKINS, Requiem (M. Bisengaliev – violin and West Kazakhstan Philharmonic Orchestra, DK K. Jenkins), EMI Classics, (No.1 in Classic Sales Chart and No.1 in "Classic" in Classic FM Magazine)
- 2006 – Havergal Brian, Violin Concerto (M. Bisengaliev – violin and BBC Scottish Symphony Orchestra, dir Lionel Friend), Naxos
- 2006 – Karl Jenkins, Tlep (M. Bisengaliev – violin and West Kazakhstan Philharmonic Orchestra, DK K. Jenkins), Sony BMG, (Gold Disc from Sony BMG)
- 2008 – Karl Jenkins, Quirk, including a concert for violin Sarikiz (M. Bisengaliev – violin and London Symphony Orchestra, K. K. Jenkins), EMI Classics
- 2011 – "Elgar / Elgar" (triple CD, full anthology)

== Bibliography ==
- Do... Re... (2011) – autobiographical

== Rewards and premiums ==
- 1988 – a prizewinner of the International Bach Competition in Leipzig ((Germany)).
- 1991 – won the first prize at the International Nicanor Zabaleta Competition, Spain. In addition to the first place received a special prize for the most virtuosic performance.
- 2000 – Honored Artist of Kazakhstan.
- 2000 – the Order "Kurmet" ("Order of Honor") from the government of Kazakhstan.
- 2000 – the first laureate of the Independent Award of patrons of Kazakhstan "Platinum Tarlan".
- 2010 – was elected as "The Music Symbol of the Decade of Kazakhstan" based on the results of an independent poll.
