= West Kazakhstan Philharmonic Orchestra =

The West Kazakhstan Philharmonic Orchestra was formed after the Regional Governor of West Kazakhstan Region approached Marat Bisengaliev with the intention of forming an orchestra specifically to compete in the annual Oral International Violin Competition. Bisengaliev acted as Founder and Art Director of the new symphony orchestra, which first performed on 30 May 2003 in Kazakhstan. The orchestra later toured England, Italy, Poland, Ukraine, India, and Kyrgyzstan. Their first recording on a Western label was of Karl Jenkins' Requiem.
