= 1995 Latin Billboard Music Awards =

2nd annual Billboard Latin Music Awards

1995 Billboard Latin Music Awards
- Date: April, 1995
- Venue: Miami, Florida

The 2nd annual Billboard Latin Music Awards which honor the most popular albums, songs, and performers in Latin music took place in Miami.

== Pop ==
=== Song of the year ===
- Vida — La Mafia

=== Pop album of the year, Male ===
- Luis Miguel — Segundo Romance

=== Pop album of the year, female ===
- Guitar Passion — Charo

=== Pop album of the year, duo or group ===
- Love and Liberté — Gipsy Kings

=== Pop album of the year, new artist ===
- Clásicos de la Provincia — Carlos Vives

=== Pop video of the year ===
- Matador — Los Fabulosos Cadillacs

== Tropical/Salsa ==
=== Tropical/salsa song of the year ===
- Viviré — Juan Luis Guerra

=== Tropical/salsa album of the year, male ===
- Cara de Niño — Jerry Rivera

=== Tropical/salsa album of the year, female ===
- Dicen Que Soy — La India

=== Tropical/salsa album of the year, duo or group ===
- Fogaraté — Juan Luis Guerra

=== Tropical/salsa album of the year, new artist ===
- Master Sessions, Volume 1 — Cachao

=== Tropical/salsa video of the year ===
- Dicen Que Soy — La India

== Regional Mexican ==
=== Regional Mexican song of the year ===
- Amor Prohibido — Selena

=== Regional Mexican album of the year, male ===
- Recordando A Los Panchos — Vicente Fernández

=== Regional Mexican album of the year, female ===
- Amor Prohibido — Selena

=== Regional Mexican album of the year, duo or group ===
- Los Dos Plebes — Los Tigres del Norte

=== Regional Mexican album of the year, new artist ===
- La Diferencia — La Diferencia

=== Regional Mexican video of the year ===
- No Me Queda Más — Selena

== Other awards ==
=== Hot latin tracks artists of the year ===
- Selena

=== Latin rap album of the year ===
- Es Mundial — El General

=== Latin rock album of the year ===
- El nervio del volcán — Caifanes

=== Latin pop/rock album of the year ===
- Maná en Vivo — Maná

=== Latin jazz album of the year ===
- Danzón (Dance On) — Arturo Sandoval

=== Billboard Lifetime achievement award ===
- Tito Puente

=== Billboard Latin Music Hall of Fame ===
- Selena
