= List of awards and nominations received by Juan Luis Guerra =

Juan Luis Guerra awards and nominations
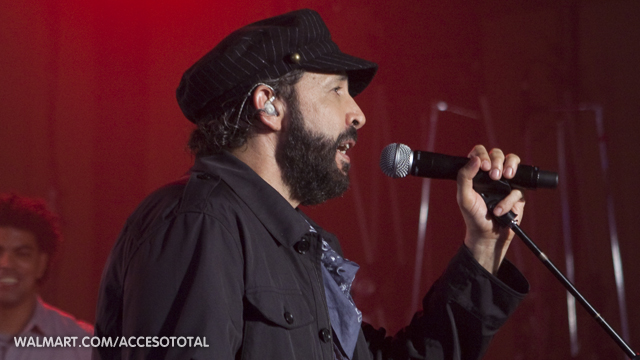
- Guerra in 2010
Awards and nominations
| Award | Wins | Nominations |
| American Music Awards | 0 | 1 |
| Arpa Awards | 3 | 8 |
| Billboard Latin Music Awards | 16 | 33 |
| BMI Latin Awards | 17 | 17 |
| Grammy Awards | 3 | 9 |
| Latin American Music Awards | 0 | 5 |
| Latin Grammy Awards | 31 | 52 |
| Lo Nuestro Awards | 14 | 65 |
| Premios Juventud | 2 | 13 |
| Soberano Awards | 30 | 51 |

Totals (Note: Certain award groups do not simply award one winner. They acknowledge several different recipients, have runners-up, and have third place. Since this is a specific recognition and is different from losing an award, runner-up mentions are considered wins in this award tally. For simplification and to avoid errors, each award in this list has been presumed to have had a prior nomination.)
- Wins: 170
- Nominations: 335

Juan Luis Guerra is a Dominican singer and producer who has received various awards and nominations through his career spanning five decades. He is one of the all-time best-selling Latin singers.

Guerra is the most awarded solo recording artist in the Latin Grammy Awards history, winning 31 from 52 nominations as of 2024. He was recognized by the Guinness World Records as the producer with most Latin Grammy Awards won, and for having won more than anyone in the categories of Album of the Year (4) and Merengue/Bachata Album (4). In addition, he has achieved three Grammy Awards from nine nominations. Guerra is the first and only artist to have ever received three times the Gran Soberano from Casandra Awards—the highest accolade at the ceremony and for a musician in Dominican Republic. Aside from his main genre, he has achieved nominations and accolades in Christian-oriented awards, including Arpa Awards and Premios AMCL.

Guerra's career and success have been recognized in major ceremonies including, BMI Latin Icon Award in 2006, Lo Nuestro Excellence Award in 2007, and a Lifetime Achievement Award at the 2019 Billboard Latin Music Awards. Outside of his work in music, he was recognized for his charitable endeavors by organizations such as United Nations and UNESCO. He was named Person of the Year by the Latin Recording Academy in 2007.

== Awards and nominations ==
| Award/organization (Note: Charts are not included, unless they are explicitly described as "awards" or specific trophies are given.) | Year | Nominee/work | Category | Result | Ref. |
|---|---|---|---|---|---|
| Academia de la Música de España | 2005 | Juan Luis Guerra | Latino de Honor | Honoree | |
| ACE Awards (Argentina) | 1993 | Juan Luis Guerra | Non-Argentina Awards | Won | |
| American Music Awards | 2007 | Juan Luis Guerra | Favorite Latin Artist | Nominated | |
| Billboard Music Awards | 2011 | "Cuando Me Enamoro" (Enrique Iglesias featuring Juan Luis Guerra) | Top Latin Song | Nominated | |
| Billboard Latin Music Awards | 1994 | Juan Luis Guerra/440 | Group of the Year | Won | |
| Billboard Latin Music Awards | 1995 | "Viviré" | Tropical/Salsa Song of The Year | Honoree | |
| Billboard Latin Music Awards | 1995 | Fogaraté | Tropical/Salsa Album of The Year, Duo or Group | Won | |
| Billboard Latin Music Awards | 1999 | Ni Es lo Mismo Ni Es Igual | Tropical/Salsa Album of The Year, Duo or Group | Honoree | |
| Billboard Latin Music Awards | 2000 | "El Niágara en Bicicleta" | Tropical/Salsa Track of The Year | Won | |
| Billboard Latin Music Awards | 2002 | Colección Romantica | Tropical/Salsa Album of The Year, Duo or Group | Won | |
| Billboard Latin Music Awards | 2005 | Juan Luis Guerra | Spirit Of Hope Award | Honoree | |
| Billboard Latin Music Awards | 2005 | Para Ti | Tropical Album Of The Year, Male | Won | |
| Billboard Latin Music Awards | 2005 | Para Ti | Latin Christian/Gospel Album Of The Year | Won | |
| Billboard Latin Music Awards | 2005 | "Las Avispas" | Tropical Airplay Track Of The Year, Male | Nominated | |
| Billboard Latin Music Awards | 2006 | "Para Ti" | Male Tropical Airplay Song of the Year | Nominated | |
| Billboard Latin Music Awards | 2008 | Juan Luis Guerra | Songwriter of the Year | Nominated | |
| Billboard Latin Music Awards | 2008 | Juan Luis Guerra | Producer of the Year | Won | |
| Billboard Latin Music Awards | 2008 | Juan Luis Guerra | Artist of the Year | Won | |
| Billboard Latin Music Awards | 2008 | La Llave de Mi Corazón | Tropical Album of the Year/Duo or Group | Won | |
| Billboard Latin Music Awards | 2008 | "Bendita tu luz" (Maná featuring Juan Luis Guerra) | Latin Pop Airplay Song of the Year | Nominated | |
| Billboard Latin Music Awards | 2008 | "La llave de mi corazón" | Tropical Airplay Song of the Year | Nominated | |
| Billboard Latin Music Awards | 2008 | "Que Me Des Tu Cariño" | Tropical Airplay Song of the Year | Nominated | |
| Billboard Latin Music Awards | 2008 | "La Travesía" | Tropical Airplay Song of the Year | Nominated | |
| Billboard Latin Music Awards | 2011 | Juan Luis Guerra | Tropical Albums Artist of the Year, Solo | Nominated | |
| Billboard Latin Music Awards | 2011 | Juan Luis Guerra | Tropical Airplay Artist of the Year, Solo | Nominated | |
| Billboard Latin Music Awards | 2011 | Juan Luis Guerra | Latin Pop Airplay Artist of the Year, Solo | Nominated | |
| Billboard Latin Music Awards | 2011 | "Cuando Me Enamoro" (Enrique Iglesias featuring Juan Luis Guerra) | Hot Latin Song of the Year | Won | |
| Billboard Latin Music Awards | 2011 | "Cuando Me Enamoro" (Enrique Iglesias featuring Juan Luis Guerra) | Hot Latin Song of the Year, Vocal Event | Won | |
| Billboard Latin Music Awards | 2011 | "Cuando Me Enamoro" (Enrique Iglesias featuring Juan Luis Guerra) | Latin Pop Airplay Song of the Year | Won | |
| Billboard Latin Music Awards | 2011 | "Cuando Me Enamoro" (Enrique Iglesias featuring Juan Luis Guerra) | Tropical Airplay Song of the Year | Nominated | |
| Billboard Latin Music Awards | 2011 | "Bachata en Fukuoka" | Tropical Airplay Song of the Year | Nominated | |
| Billboard Latin Music Awards | 2011 | A Son de Guerra | Tropical Albums Artist of the Year, Solo | Nominated | |
| Billboard Latin Music Awards | 2014 | Juan Luis Guerra | Tropical Albums Artist of the Year, Solo | Nominated | |
| Billboard Latin Music Awards | 2015 | Juan Luis Guerra | Tropical Songs Artist of the Year, Solo | Nominated | |
| Billboard Latin Music Awards | 2015 | Todo Tiene Su Hora | Tropical Album of the Year | Nominated | |
| Billboard Latin Music Awards | 2019 | Juan Luis Guerra | Lifetime Achievement Award | Honoree | |
| Billboard Latin Music Awards | 2020 | Juan Luis Guerra | Tropical Artist of the Year | Nominated | |
| BMI Latin Awards | 1994 | "El Costo de la Vida" | Award-winning songs | Won | |
| BMI Latin Awards | 1995 | "Coronita de Flores" | Award-winning songs | Won | |
| BMI Latin Awards | 1995 | "Hasta Que Me Olvides" | Award-winning songs | Won | |
| BMI Latin Awards | 1995 | Juan Luis Guerra | Composer of the Year | Won | |
| BMI Latin Awards | 1996 | Juan Luis Guerra | Composer of the Year | Won | |
| BMI Latin Awards | 1996 | "El Beso de la Ciguatera" | Award-winning songs | Won | |
| BMI Latin Awards | 1996 | "La Cosquilla" | Award-winning songs | Won | |
| BMI Latin Awards | 1996 | "Viviré" | Award-winning songs | Won | |
| BMI Latin Awards | 2000 | "Palomita Blanca" | Award-winning songs | Won | |
| BMI Latin Awards | 2001 | "El Niágara en Bicicleta" | Award-winning songs | Won | |
| BMI Latin Awards | 2001 | "Mi PC" | Award-winning songs | Won | |
| BMI Latin Awards | 2006 | Juan Luis Guerra | Icon Award | Honoree | |
| BMI Latin Awards | 2006 | "Por Ti" | Award-winning songs | Won | |
| BMI Latin Awards | 2006 | "Las Avispas" | Award-winning songs | Won | |
| BMI Latin Awards | 2008 | "La Llave de Mi Corazón" | Award-winning songs | Won | |
| BMI Latin Awards | 2010 | "La Travesía" | Award-winning songs | Won | |
| BMI Latin Awards | 2014 | "En El Cielo No Hay Hospital" | Award-winning songs | Won | |
| Bravo Awards | 1988 | Juan Luis Guerra | Best New Artist | Nominated | |
| Cadena Dial | 2008 | Juan Luis Guerra | Dial Award | Won | |
| Cadena Dial | 2011 | Juan Luis Guerra | Special Award 20th Anniversary | Honoree | |
| Casandra Awards (a.k.a. Soberano Awards) | 1991 | Juan Luis Guerra | Gran Soberano | Honoree | |
| Casandra Awards (a.k.a. Soberano Awards) | 1991 | Juan Luis Guerra/440 | Popular Musical Group Abroad | Won | |
| Casandra Awards (a.k.a. Soberano Awards) | 1991 | "La Bilirrubina" | Merengue of the Year | Won | |
| Casandra Awards (a.k.a. Soberano Awards) | 1992 | Juan Luis Guerra | Gran Soberano | Honoree | |
| Casandra Awards (a.k.a. Soberano Awards) | 1993 | Juan Luis Guerra/440 | Best Artist/Group Abroad | Won | |
| Casandra Awards (a.k.a. Soberano Awards) | 1993 | "El Costo de la Vida" | Video of the Year | Won | |
| Casandra Awards (a.k.a. Soberano Awards) | 1993 | Tribute concert to José Martí | Concert of the Year | Won | |
| Casandra Awards (a.k.a. Soberano Awards) | 1995 | Juan Luis Guerra | Show of the Year | Won | |
| Casandra Awards (a.k.a. Soberano Awards) | 2000 | Juan Luis Guerra | Composer/Lyricist of the Year | Won | |
| Casandra Awards (a.k.a. Soberano Awards) | 2005 | Juan Luis Guerra | Best Artist Abroad | Won | |
| Casandra Awards (a.k.a. Soberano Awards) | 2005 | Juan Luis Guerra | Composer/Lyricist of the Year | Nominated | |
| Casandra Awards (a.k.a. Soberano Awards) | 2005 | "Las Avispas" | Merengue of the Year | Won | |
| Casandra Awards (a.k.a. Soberano Awards) | 2005 | "Las Avispas" | Video of the Year | Nominated | |
| Casandra Awards (a.k.a. Soberano Awards) | 2005 | Para Ti | Best Album of the Year | Nominated | |
| Casandra Awards (a.k.a. Soberano Awards) | 2008 | Juan Luis Guerra | Gran Soberano | Honoree | |
| Casandra Awards (a.k.a. Soberano Awards) | 2008 | Juan Luis Guerra | Composer of the Year | Won | |
| Casandra Awards (a.k.a. Soberano Awards) | 2008 | Juan Luis Guerra | Best Artist Abroad | Won | |
| Casandra Awards (a.k.a. Soberano Awards) | 2008 | Juan Luis Guerra | Orchestrator and/or Arrangement | Nominated | |
| Casandra Awards (a.k.a. Soberano Awards) | 2008 | "La llave de mi corazón" | Video of the Year | Won | |
| Casandra Awards (a.k.a. Soberano Awards) | 2008 | "La llave de mi corazón" | Song of the Year | Won | |
| Casandra Awards (a.k.a. Soberano Awards) | 2008 | La Llave de Mi Corazón | Album of the Year | Won | |
| Casandra Awards (a.k.a. Soberano Awards) | 2008 | "La Travesía" | Merengue of the Year | Nominated | |
| Casandra Awards (a.k.a. Soberano Awards) | 2011 | Juan Luis Guerra | Orchestrator and/or Arrangement | Nominated | |
| Casandra Awards (a.k.a. Soberano Awards) | 2011 | Juan Luis Guerra | Composer/Lyricist of the Year | Nominated | |
| Casandra Awards (a.k.a. Soberano Awards) | 2011 | Juan Luis Guerra | Best Artist Abroad | Won | |
| Casandra Awards (a.k.a. Soberano Awards) | 2011 | A Son de Guerra | Album of the Year | Won | |
| Casandra Awards (a.k.a. Soberano Awards) | 2011 | "Bachata en Fukuoka" | Merengue of the Year | Nominated | |
| Casandra Awards (a.k.a. Soberano Awards) | 2012 | Juan Luis Guerra | Best Artist Abroad | Nominated | |
| Casandra Awards (a.k.a. Soberano Awards) | 2014 | Juan Luis Guerra | Soberano Solidario | Honoree | |
| Casandra Awards (a.k.a. Soberano Awards) | 2014 | Juan Luis Guerra | Best Artist Abroad | Won | |
| Casandra Awards (a.k.a. Soberano Awards) | 2015 | Juan Luis Guerra | Composer of the Year | Nominated | |
| Casandra Awards (a.k.a. Soberano Awards) | 2015 | Juan Luis Guerra | Best Artist/Group Abroad | Nominated | |
| Casandra Awards (a.k.a. Soberano Awards) | 2015 | "Tus Besos" | Video of the Year | Won | |
| Casandra Awards (a.k.a. Soberano Awards) | 2015 | "Tus Besos" | Bachata of the Year | Nominated | |
| Casandra Awards (a.k.a. Soberano Awards) | 2015 | Todo Tiene Su Hora | Album of the Year | Nominated | |
| Casandra Awards (a.k.a. Soberano Awards) | 2016 | Juan Luis Guerra | Composer of the Year | Nominated | |
| Casandra Awards (a.k.a. Soberano Awards) | 2016 | Juan Luis Guerra | Best Artist/Group Abroad | Nominated | |
| Casandra Awards (a.k.a. Soberano Awards) | 2016 | Todo Tiene Su Hora Tour | Concert of the Year | Won | |
| Casandra Awards (a.k.a. Soberano Awards) | 2016 | "Muchachita Linda" | Video of the Year | Nominated | |
| Casandra Awards (a.k.a. Soberano Awards) | 2017 | Juan Luis Guerra | Best Artist/Group Abroad | Won | |
| Casandra Awards (a.k.a. Soberano Awards) | 2017 | Juan Luis Guerra | Best Artist Abroad | Won | |
| Casandra Awards (a.k.a. Soberano Awards) | 2019 | "Kitipun" | Video of the Year | Nominated | |
| Casandra Awards (a.k.a. Soberano Awards) | 2019 | "Lámpara Pa' Mis Pies" | Merengue of the Year | Won | |
| Casandra Awards (a.k.a. Soberano Awards) | 2019 | Literal | Album of the Year | Nominated | |
| Casandra Awards (a.k.a. Soberano Awards) | 2019 | "Loma de Cayenas" (with Vicente García) | Collaboration of the Year | Nominated | |
| Casandra Awards (a.k.a. Soberano Awards) | 2021 | Entre Mar y Palmeras | Album of the Year | Nominated | |
| Casandra Awards (a.k.a. Soberano Awards) | 2022 | Juan Luis Guerra | Best Artist/Group Abroad | Won | |
| Casandra Awards (a.k.a. Soberano Awards) | 2022 | "Las de Juan Luis" (with Luis Segura) | Collaboration of the Year | Won | |
| Casandra Awards (a.k.a. Soberano Awards) | 2022 | "Las de Juan Luis" (with Luis Segura) | Video of the Year | Nominated | |
| Casandra Awards (a.k.a. Soberano Awards) | 2024 | Juan Luis Guerra | Best Artist/Group Abroad | Won | |
| Casandra Awards (a.k.a. Soberano Awards) | 2024 | "Mambo 23" | Merengue of the Year | Nominated | |
| Casandra Awards (a.k.a. Soberano Awards) | 2024 | "Mambo 23" | Video of the Year | Won | |
| Desi Entertainment Awards | 1995 | Juan Luis Guerra/440 | Best Group | Won | |
| Fundación de la Herencia Hispana | 2010 | Juan Luis Guerra | Premio de la Herencia Hispana | Honoree | |
| Grammy Awards | 1992 | Bachata Rosa | Best Latin Pop Album | Won | |
| Grammy Awards | 1994 | Areíto | Best Tropical Latin Album | Nominated | |
| Grammy Awards | 1996 | Fogaraté | Best Tropical Latin Performance | Nominated | |
| Grammy Awards | 2000 | Ni Es lo Mismo Ni Es Igual | Best Latin Pop Performance | Nominated | |
| Grammy Awards | 2008 | La Llave de Mi Corazón | Best Tropical Latin Album | Won | |
| Grammy Awards | 2011 | A Son de Guerra | Best Tropical Latin Album | Nominated | |
| Grammy Awards | 2013 | MTV Unplugged (Deluxe Edition) | Best Latin Pop Album | Won | |
| Grammy Awards | 2016 | Todo Tiene Su Hora | Best Latin Pop Album | Nominated | |
| Grammy Awards | 2020 | Literal | Best Tropical Latin Album | Nominated | |
| Grammy Awards | 2025 | Radio Güira | Best Tropical Latin Album | Nominated | |
| Heat Latin Music Awards | 2015 | Juan Luis Guerra | Engagement Award | Honoree | |
| International Latin Music Hall of Fame | 2015 | Juan Luis Guerra | Hall of Fame inductee | Honoree | |
| Latin American Music Awards | 2015 | Juan Luis Guerra | Favorite Tropical Artist | Nominated | |
| Latin American Music Awards | 2019 | Juan Luis Guerra | Favorite Tropical Artist | Nominated | |
| Latin American Music Awards | 2019 | Literal | Favorite Tropical Album | Nominated | |
| Latin American Music Awards | 2021 | Privé | Favorite Virtual Concert | Nominated | |
| Latin American Music Awards | 2024 | "Si Tú Me Quieres" (with Fonseca) | Best Collaboration - Tropical | Nominated | |
| Latin Grammy Awards | 2000 | Ni Es lo Mismo Ni Es Igual | Album of the Year | Nominated | |
| Latin Grammy Awards | 2000 | Ni Es lo Mismo Ni Es Igual | Best Merengue Album | Won | |
| Latin Grammy Awards | 2000 | "El Niágara en Bicicleta" | Song of the Year | Nominated | |
| Latin Grammy Awards | 2000 | "El Niágara en Bicicleta" | Best Tropical Song | Won | |
| Latin Grammy Awards | 2005 | "Las Avispas" | Best Tropical Song | Won | |
| Latin Grammy Awards | 2005 | Para Ti | Best Christian Album (Spanish Language) | Won | |
| Latin Grammy Awards | 2008 | "La llave de mi corazón" | Record of the Year | Won | |
| Latin Grammy Awards | 2008 | "La llave de mi corazón" | Song of the Year | Won | |
| Latin Grammy Awards | 2008 | "La llave de mi corazón" | Best Tropical Song | Won | |
| Latin Grammy Awards | 2008 | La Llave de Mi Corazón | Album of the Year | Won | |
| Latin Grammy Awards | 2008 | La Llave de Mi Corazón | Best Merengue Album | Won | |
| Latin Grammy Awards | 2010 | A Son de Guerra | Album of the Year | Won | |
| Latin Grammy Awards | 2010 | A Son de Guerra | Best Contemporary Tropical Album | Won | |
| Latin Grammy Awards | 2010 | "Cuando Me Enamoro" (Enrique Iglesias featuring Juan Luis Guerra) | Song of the Year | Nominated | |
| Latin Grammy Awards | 2010 | "Bachata en Fukuoka" | Best Tropical Song | Won | |
| Latin Grammy Awards | 2010 | "Bachata en Fukuoka" | Best Short Form Music Video | Nominated | |
| Latin Grammy Awards | 2012 | "En El Cielo No Hay Hospital" | Record of the Year | Nominated | |
| Latin Grammy Awards | 2012 | "En El Cielo No Hay Hospital" | Song of the Year | Nominated | |
| Latin Grammy Awards | 2012 | "Azul Sabina" (Juanes featuring Joaquín Sabina and Juan Luis Guerra) | Song of the Year | Nominated | |
| Latin Grammy Awards | 2012 | "Toma Mi Vida" (Milly Quezada featuring Juan Luis Guerra) | Best Tropical Song | Won | |
| Latin Grammy Awards | 2012 | Juan Luis Guerra | Producer of the Year | Won | |
| Latin Grammy Awards | 2013 | "Bachata Rosa" (with Natalie Cole) | Record of the Year | Nominated | |
| Latin Grammy Awards | 2013 | A Son de Guerra Tour (album) | Best Contemporary Tropical Album | Won | |
| Latin Grammy Awards | 2014 | "Llegaste Tú" (Luis Fonsi featuring Juan Luis Guerra) | Record of the Year | Nominated | |
| Latin Grammy Awards | 2015 | "Tus Besos" | Record of the Year | Nominated | |
| Latin Grammy Awards | 2015 | "Tus Besos" | Best Tropical Song | Won | |
| Latin Grammy Awards | 2015 | Todo Tiene Su Hora | Album of the Year | Won | |
| Latin Grammy Awards | 2015 | Todo Tiene Su Hora | Best Contemporary Tropical Album | Won | |
| Latin Grammy Awards | 2018 | "Quiero Tiempo" (Víctor Manuelle featuring Juan Luis Guerra) | Best Tropical Song | Won | |
| Latin Grammy Awards | 2019 | "Kitipun" | Record of the Year | Nominated | |
| Latin Grammy Awards | 2019 | "Kitipun" | Song of the Year | Nominated | |
| Latin Grammy Awards | 2019 | "Kitipun" | Best Tropical Song | Won | |
| Latin Grammy Awards | 2019 | Literal | Best Contemporany Tropical/Tropical Fusion Album | Won | |
| Latin Grammy Awards | 2021 | "Dios Así Lo Quiso" (with Ricardo Montaner) | Record of the Year | Nominated | |
| Latin Grammy Awards | 2021 | "Dios Así Lo Quiso" (with Ricardo Montaner) | Best Tropical Song | Won | |
| Latin Grammy Awards | 2021 | "Dios Así Lo Quiso" (with Ricardo Montaner) | Song of the Year | Nominated | |
| Latin Grammy Awards | 2021 | "Ojalá que Llueva Café (Versión Privé)" | Best Arrangement | Won | |
| Latin Grammy Awards | 2021 | "Pambiche de Novia" | Best Tropical Song | Nominated | |
| Latin Grammy Awards | 2021 | "Entre Mar y Palmeras" | Best Long Form Music Video | Won | |
| Latin Grammy Awards | 2021 | "Mi Guitarra" (with Javier Limón and Nella) | Song of the Year | Nominated | |
| Latin Grammy Awards | 2021 | Privé | Album of the Year | Nominated | |
| Latin Grammy Awards | 2021 | Privé | Best Traditional Pop Vocal Album | Won | |
| Latin Grammy Awards | 2022 | "Vale la Pena" | Record of the Year | Nominated | |
| Latin Grammy Awards | 2022 | Entre Mar y Palmeras | Best Merengue/Bachata Album | Won | |
| Latin Grammy Awards | 2023 | "Si Tú Me Quieres" (with Fonseca) | Song of the Year | Nominated | |
| Latin Grammy Awards | 2023 | "Si Tú Me Quieres" (with Fonseca) | Record of the Year | Nominated | |
| Latin Grammy Awards | 2023 | "Si Tú Me Quieres" (with Fonseca) | Best Tropical Song | Won | |
| Latin Grammy Awards | 2024 | "Mambo 23" | Record of the Year | Won | |
| Latin Grammy Awards | 2024 | "Mambo 23" | Best Tropical Song | Won | |
| Latin Grammy Awards | 2024 | Radio Güira | Album of the Year | Won | |
| Latin Grammy Awards | 2024 | Radio Güira | Best Merengue/Bachata Album | Won | |
| Latin Grammy Awards | 2024 | Juan Luis Guerra | Producer of the Year | Nominated | |
| Latin Recording Academy | 2007 | Juan Luis Guerra | Person of the Year | Won | |
| Latin Songwriters Hall of Fame | 2013 | Juan Luis Guerra | Hall of Fame Inductee | Nominated | |
| Latin Songwriters Hall of Fame | 2014 | Juan Luis Guerra | Hall of Fame Inductee | Nominated | |
| Lo Nuestro Awards | 1991 | "Burbujas de Amor" | Tropical/Salsa Song of the Year | Won | |
| Lo Nuestro Awards | 1991 | "La Bilirrubina" | Tropical/Salsa Song of the Year | Nominated | |
| Lo Nuestro Awards | 1991 | "Estrellitas y Duendes" | Tropical/Salsa Song of the Year | Nominated | |
| Lo Nuestro Awards | 1991 | Juan Luis Guerra/440 | Tropical Salsa Group of the Year | Won | |
| Lo Nuestro Awards | 1991 | "A Pedir Su Mano" | Video of the Year | Won | |
| Lo Nuestro Awards | 1992 | Bachata Rosa | Tropical Salsa Album of the Year | Won | |
| Lo Nuestro Awards | 1992 | "Frío Frío" | Tropical Salsa Song of the Year | Nominated | |
| Lo Nuestro Awards | 1992 | Juan Luis Guerra/440 | Tropical Salsa Group of the Year | Won | |
| Lo Nuestro Awards | 1993 | Juan Luis Guerra/440 | Tropical/Salsa Group of the Year | Won | |
| Lo Nuestro Awards | 1993 | "El Costo de la Vida" | Video of the Year | Nominated | |
| Lo Nuestro Awards | 1993 | "El Costo de la Vida" | Tropical/Salsa Song of the Year | Won | |
| Lo Nuestro Awards | 1994 | Juan Luis Guerra/440 | Tropical/Salsa Group of the Year | Nominated | |
| Lo Nuestro Awards | 1994 | Areíto | Tropical Album of the Year | Nominated | |
| Lo Nuestro Awards | 1994 | "Coronita de Flores" | Tropical/Salsa Song of the Year | Nominated | |
| Lo Nuestro Awards | 1994 | "Coronita de Flores" | Video of the Year | Nominated | |
| Lo Nuestro Awards | 1995 | Juan Luis Guerra/440 | Tropical/Salsa Group of the Year | Nominated | |
| Lo Nuestro Awards | 1995 | "Viviré" | Tropical/Salsa Album of the Year | Nominated | |
| Lo Nuestro Awards | 1995 | Fogaraté | Video of the Year | Nominated | |
| Lo Nuestro Awards | 1999 | "El Aguacero" | Video of the Year | Nominated | |
| Lo Nuestro Awards | 2000 | "El Niágara en Bicicleta" | Tropical/Salsa Song of the Year | Nominated | |
| Lo Nuestro Awards | 2001 | "Quisiera" | Video of the Year | Nominated | |
| Lo Nuestro Awards | 2006 | Juan Luis Guerra | Tropical Male Artist of the Year | Nominated | |
| Lo Nuestro Awards | 2006 | Juan Luis Guerra | Merengue Artist of the Year | Nominated | |
| Lo Nuestro Awards | 2007 | Juan Luis Guerra | Excellence Award | Honoree | |
| Lo Nuestro Awards | 2008 | Juan Luis Guerra | Tropical Male Artist of the Year | Won | |
| Lo Nuestro Awards | 2008 | Juan Luis Guerra | Merengue Artist of the Year | Nominated | |
| Lo Nuestro Awards | 2008 | "Que Me Des Tu Cariño" | Tropical Song of the Year | Nominated | |
| Lo Nuestro Awards | 2008 | La Llave de Mi Corazón | Album of the Year | Nominated | |
| Lo Nuestro Awards | 2008 | "Bendita tu luz" (Maná featuring Juan Luis Guerra) | Rock Song of the Year | Won | |
| Lo Nuestro Awards | 2009 | Juan Luis Guerra | Tropical Merengue Artist of the Year | Nominated | |
| Lo Nuestro Awards | 2009 | Juan Luis Guerra | Merengue Artist of the Year | Nominated | |
| Lo Nuestro Awards | 2009 | "Como Yo" | Tropical Song of the Year | Nominated | |
| Lo Nuestro Awards | 2010 | Juan Luis Guerra | Merengue Artist of the Year | Won | |
| Lo Nuestro Awards | 2011 | Juan Luis Guerra | Tropical Male Artist of the Year | Nominated | |
| Lo Nuestro Awards | 2011 | Juan Luis Guerra | Merengue Artist of the Year | Won | |
| Lo Nuestro Awards | 2011 | "Cuando Me Enamoro" (Enrique Iglesias featuring Juan Luis Guerra) | Pop Song of the Year | Nominated | |
| Lo Nuestro Awards | 2011 | "Cuando Me Enamoro" (Enrique Iglesias featuring Juan Luis Guerra) | Collaboration of the Year | Won | |
| Lo Nuestro Awards | 2011 | A Son de Guerra | Tropical Album of the Year | Nominated | |
| Lo Nuestro Awards | 2011 | "Bachata en Fukuoka" | Tropical Song of the Year | Nominated | |
| Lo Nuestro Awards | 2013 | Juan Luis Guerra | Merengue Artist of the Year | Won | |
| Lo Nuestro Awards | 2015 | "Tus Besos" | Video of the Year | Nominated | |
| Lo Nuestro Awards | 2016 | Juan Luis Guerra | Tropical Male Artist of the Year | Nominated | |
| Lo Nuestro Awards | 2016 | Juan Luis Guerra | Tropical Artist of the Year | Nominated | |
| Lo Nuestro Awards | 2016 | Todo Tiene Su Hora | Tropical Album of the Year | Nominated | |
| Lo Nuestro Awards | 2016 | Todo Tiene Su Hora | Album of the Year | Nominated | |
| Lo Nuestro Awards | 2016 | "Llegaste Tú" (Luis Fonsi featuring Juan Luis Guerra) | Pop Song of the Year | Nominated | |
| Lo Nuestro Awards | 2016 | "Tus Besos" | Tropical Song of the Year | Nominated | |
| Lo Nuestro Awards | 2019 | Juan Luis Guerra | Tropical Artist of the Year | Nominated | |
| Lo Nuestro Awards | 2019 | "Quiero Tiempo" (Víctor Manuelle (featuring Juan Luis Guerra) | Tropical Song of the Year | Nominated | |
| Lo Nuestro Awards | 2019 | "Quiero Tiempo" (Víctor Manuelle (featuring Juan Luis Guerra) | Tropical Collaboration of the Year | Nominated | |
| Lo Nuestro Awards | 2020 | Juan Luis Guerra | Tropical Artist of the Year | Nominated | |
| Lo Nuestro Awards | 2020 | "Kitipun" | Tropical Song of the Year | Nominated | |
| Lo Nuestro Awards | 2020 | "Loma de Cayenas" (with Vicente García) | Tropical Collaboration of the Year | Nominated | |
| Lo Nuestro Awards | 2021 | Juan Luis Guerra | Tropical Artist of the Year | Nominated | |
| Lo Nuestro Awards | 2021 | "Lámpara Pa' Mis Pies" | Tropical Song of the Year | Nominated | |
| Lo Nuestro Awards | 2022 | Juan Luis Guerra/440 | Tropical Artist of the Year | Nominated | |
| Lo Nuestro Awards | 2022 | "Dios Así Lo Quiso" (with Ricardo Montaner) | Tropical Song of the Year | Nominated | |
| Lo Nuestro Awards | 2022 | Entre Mar y Palmeras | Album of the Year | Nominated | |
| Lo Nuestro Awards | 2023 | Juan Luis Guerra | Tropical Artist of the Year | Nominated | |
| Lo Nuestro Awards | 2024 | Juan Luis Guerra | Tropical Artist of the Year | Nominated | |
| Lo Nuestro Awards | 2024 | "Si Tú Me Quieres" (with Fonseca) | Tropical Collaboration of the Year | Nominated | |
| Lo Nuestro Awards | 2025 | "Mambo 23" | Christian Song of the Year | Nominated | |
| Lo Nuestro Awards | 2025 | "Mambo 23" | Tropical Song of the Year | Nominated | |
| Lo Nuestro Awards | 2025 | Juan Luis Guerra 4.40 | Tropical Artist of the Year | Nominated | |
| Lo Nuestro Awards | 2025 | Radio Güira | Tropical Album of the Year | Nominated | |
| Miami Life Awards | 2007 | Juan Luis Guerra | International Male Singer | Nominated | |
| Monitor Latino Awards | 2021 | "Dios así lo quiso" (Ricardo Montaner featuring Juan Luis Guerra) | Best Christian Song | Nominated | |
| New York Latin ACE Awards | 1991 | Juan Luis Guerra/440 | Best Revelation — Music | Won | |
| New York Latin ACE Awards | 1991 | Juan Luis Guerra/440 | Merengue Act | Won | |
| New York Latin ACE Awards | 1991 | Ojalá Que Llueva Café | Mexican Regional Album | Won | |
| New York Latin ACE Awards | 1992 | Bachata Rosa | Album of the Year — Regional Rhythms | Won | |
| Orgullosamente Latino Award | 2008 | Juan Luis Guerra | Latin Lifetime Award | Nominated | |
| Orgullosamente Latino Award | 2010 | "Cuando Me Enamoro" (Enrique Iglesias featuring Juan Luis Guerra) | Latin Song of the Year | Nominated | |
| Orgullosamente Latino Award | 2010 | "Cuando Me Enamoro" (Enrique Iglesias featuring Juan Luis Guerra) | Latin Video of the Year | Won | |
| People en Español Awards | 2010 | Juan Luis Guerra | Best Solo/Group Tropical Artist | Won | |
| Premios AMCL | 2005 | Juan Luis Guerra | Composer of the Year | Won | |
| Premios AMCL | 2005 | "Para Ti" | Composition of the Year | Nominated | |
| Premios AMCL | 2005 | Para Ti | Singer-Songwriter Album of the Year | Won | |
| Premios AMCL | 2005 | Para Ti | Tropical Album of the Year | Nominated | |
| Premios AMCL | 2005 | "Las Avispas" | Christian Latin Song of the Year | Won | |
| Premios AMCL | 2006 | "Los Dinteles" | Christian Latin Song of the Year | Nominated | |
| Premios AMCL | 2010 | "Son al Rey" | Christian Latin Song of the Year | Nominated | |
| Premios AMCL | 2012 | "Tu nombre" (with Marcos Vidal) | Collaboration of the Year | Nominated | |
| Premios AMCL | 2012 | "En El Cielo No Hay Hospital" | Christian Latin Song of the Year | Won | |
| Premios AMCL | 2012 | Coleccion Cristiana | Tropical Album of the Year | Won | |
| Premios AMCL | 2012 | Juan Luis Guerra | Male Vocalist of the Year | Nominated | |
| Premios AMCL | 2024 | "Mambo 23" | Christian Latin Song of the Year | Nominated | |
| Premios Arpa | 2005 | "Las Avispas" | Song of the Year | Nominated | |
| Premios Arpa | 2005 | Juan Luis Guerra | Producer of the Year | Nominated | |
| Premios Arpa | 2005 | Para Ti | Album of the Year | Won | |
| Premios Arpa | 2005 | Para Ti | Regional/Tropical Album of the Year | Won | |
| Premios Arpa | 2011 | "Son al Rey" | Song of the Year | Nominated | |
| Premios Arpa | 2011 | Juan Luis Guerra | Composer of the Year | Nominated | |
| Premios Arpa | 2012 | "Tu nombre" (with Marcos Vidal) | Best Collaboration | Won | |
| Premios Arpa | 2024 | "Mambo 23" | Song of the Year | Shortlisted | |
| Premios Juventud | 2007 | "Bendita tu luz" (Maná featuring Juan Luis Guerra) | The Perfect Combo | Nominated | |
| Premios Juventud | 2007 | Juan Luis Guerra | Favorite Tropical Artist | Nominated | |
| Premios Juventud | 2008 | Juan Luis Guerra | Favorite Tropical Artist | Nominated | |
| Premios Juventud | 2010 | Juan Luis Guerra | Idol of Generations | Honoree | |
| Premios Juventud | 2011 | Juan Luis Guerra | Favorite Tropical Artist | Nominated | |
| Premios Juventud | 2011 | "Cuando Me Enamoro" (Enrique Iglesias featuring Juan Luis Guerra) | The Perfect Combo | Won | |
| Premios Juventud | 2012 | "Cuando Me Enamoro" (Enrique Iglesias featuring Juan Luis Guerra) | Best Theme Novelero | Nominated | |
| Premios Juventud | 2015 | Juan Luis Guerra | Favorite Tropical Artist | Nominated | |
| Premios Juventud | 2016 | Juan Luis Guerra | Favorite Tropical Artist | Nominated | |
| Premios Juventud | 2022 | "Dios Así Lo Quiso" (with Ricardo Montaner) | Best Tropical Mix (Collaboration) | Nominated | |
| Premios Juventud | 2024 | "Si Tú Me Quieres" (with Fonseca) | Best Tropical Mix | Nominated | |
| Premios Juventud | 2024 | "Mambo 23" | Best Tropical Hit | Nominated | |
| Premios Juventud | 2024 | Radio Güira | Best Tropical Album | Nominated | |
| Premios Eres (Mexico) | 1992 | Juan Luis Guerra | Best Tropical Band | Won | |
| Premios Nuestra Tierra | 2013 | Juan Luis Guerra (Juanes MTV Unplugged) | Producer of the Year | Won | |
| Premios Nuestra Tierra | 2024 | "Cecilia" (with Juanes) | Song of the Year | Nominated | |
| Premios Ondas | 1994 | Juan Luis Guerra | Best Latin Artist | Won | |
| Premios Oye! | 2007 | Juan Luis Guerra | Solo/Group Tropical Artist | Won | |
| Premios Oye! | 2010 | "Cuando Me Enamoro" (Enrique Iglesias featuring Juan Luis Guerra) | Spanish Record of the Year | Nominated | |
| Premios Oye! | 2010 | "Cuando Me Enamoro" (Enrique Iglesias featuring Juan Luis Guerra) | Theme from a Telenovela, Movie or T.V. Series | Won | |
| Premios Tú Musica (Puerto Rico) | 2004 | Juan Luis Guerra | Peace Award | Honoree | |
| Premios Tú Musica (Puerto Rico) | 2004 | Juan Luis Guerra | Dedication Award | Honoree | |
| Premios TVyNovelas | 2011 | "Cuando Me Enamoro" (Enrique Iglesias featuring Juan Luis Guerra) | Best Musical Theme | Won | |
| PROMUSICAE | 2015 | Juan Luis Guerra | Special recognition: 2 million copies in Spain | Honoree | |
| Quiero Awards (Argentina) | 2018 | "Si No Te Hubieras Ido" (with David Bisbal) | Best Collaboration | Nominated | |
| Ritmo Latino Awards (Note: Also known as "Premio de la Gente" or Latin Music Fan Awards.) | 1999 | Juan Luis Guerra | Merengue Solo Artist | Nominated | |
| Ritmo Latino Awards | 2005 | Juan Luis Guerra | Popular Music Solo/Group Artist | Nominated | |
| Ritmo Latino Awards | 2005 | Juan Luis Guerra | Tropical Artist of the Year | Won | |
| Ritmo Latino Awards | 2005 | Juan Luis Guerra | Christian Artist of the Year | Won | |
| Ritmo Latino Awards | 2005 | Juan Luis Guerra | Artist of the Year | Nominated | |
| Ronda Awards (Venezuela) | 1994 | Juan Luis Guerra | | Nominated | |
| RTVE Disco del Año Gala (Spain) | 2010 | A Son de Guerra | Album of the Year | Nominated | |
| Tele Antillas Gala Awards | 2012 | Juan Luis Guerra | Person of the Year — Music | Won | |
| Telehit Awards | 2010 | "Cuando Me Enamoro" (Enrique Iglesias featuring Juan Luis Guerra) | Song of the Year | Nominated | |
| Videoclip Awards (Dominican Republic) | 2016 | "Todo Tiene Su Hora" | Best Video of the Year | Won | |
| Videoclip Awards (Dominican Republic) | 2016 | "Todo Tiene Su Hora" | Best Merengue Video | Won | |
| Videoclip Awards (Dominican Republic) | 2016 | "Todo Tiene Su Hora" | Best Visual Effects (credited with dir. Jean Guerra) | Won | |
| Videoclip Awards (Dominican Republic) | 2016 | "Muchachita Linda" | Best Art Direction (credited with dir. Jean Guerra) | Won | |
| Videoclip Awards (Dominican Republic) | 2019 | "Loma de Cayenas" (with Vicente García) | Best Merengue Video | Nominated | |
| Videoclip Awards (Dominican Republic) | 2019 | "Carmín" (with Romeo Santos) | Best Bachata Video | Nominated | |
| Videoclip Awards (Dominican Republic) | 2023 | Juan Luis Guerra | Merit Award | Honoree | |
| Videoclip Awards (Dominican Republic) | 2024 | "Mambo 23" | Best Merengue Video | Won | |
| Viña del Mar International Song Festival | 2000 | Juan Luis Guerra | Gaviota de Plata (Silver Gull) | Silver | |
| Viña del Mar International Song Festival | 2006 | Juan Luis Guerra | Antorcha de Oro (Gold Torch) | Gold | |
| Viña del Mar International Song Festival | 2006 | Juan Luis Guerra | Antorcha de Plata (Silver Torch) | Silver | |
| Viña del Mar International Song Festival | 2012 | Juan Luis Guerra | Gaviota de Oro (Gold Gull) | Gold | |
| Viña del Mar International Song Festival | 2012 | Juan Luis Guerra | Gaviota de Plata | Silver | |
| Viña del Mar International Song Festival | 2012 | Juan Luis Guerra | Antorcha de Oro | Gold | |
| Viña del Mar International Song Festival | 2012 | Juan Luis Guerra | Antorcha de Plata | Silver | |
| Walt Disney World | 2008 | Juan Luis Guerra | Mouscar Award | Honoree | |
| World Music Awards | 2013 | Juan Luis Guerra | World's Best Male Singer | Nominated | |

== Other honors ==
Name of country, year given, and name of honor
| Organization | Country | Year | Honor | Status | Ref. |
|---|---|---|---|---|---|
| UNESCO | France/Worldwide | 2008 | Honorary title: Artist for the Peace | Honoree | |
| Berklee College of Music | United States | 2009 | Honorary Doctor of Music | Honoree | |
| Universidad Autónoma de Santo Domingo | Dominican Republic | 2009 | Doctor Honoris Causa | Honoree | |
| United Nations | Worldwide | 2014 | Women Together Foundation Award | Honoree | |
| Ministry of Culture/President Laurentino Cortizo | Panama | 2019 | Special Parchment | Honoree | |
| Ministry of Tourism/President Luis Abinader | Dominica Republic | 2020 | Honorific Ambrassor of "Marca Pais" | Honoree | |
| Fundación Bulevar de las Estrellas | Dominican Republic | | Santo Domingo Walk of Fame | Honoree | |
| | Dominican Republic | | Prominent Son | Honoree | |
