= Tour 20 años =

2004–06 concert tour by Juan Luis Guerra

- Tour by Juan Luis Guerra
- Associated album: Para Ti
- Start date: September 25, 2004
- End date: February 22, 2006
- No. of shows: 28

Juan Luis Guerra concert chronology
- Areíto World Tour (1993); Tour 20 años (2004–06); La Travesia Tour (2008–09)

Tour 20 años (English: 20 Years Tour) is a concert tour by bachata superstar Juan Luis Guerra and 4:40 to support his 9th studio album Para Ti and to celebrate the 20th anniversary of his debut. It was his first official tour since the Areíto World Tour in 1993.

== Tour dates ==
Date	City	Country	Venue
Caribbean
September 25, 2004	Willemstad	Curuzao	
September 26, 2004	Aruba		
October 8, 2004	San Juan	Puerto Rico	Coliseo de Puerto Rico
October 9, 2004	San Juan	Puerto Rico	Coliseo de Puerto Rico
November 3, 2004	Caracas	Venezuela	Poliedro de Caracas
November 7, 2004 (Note: This concert was co-headlined with Ednita Rosario)	Bogota	Colombia	Estadio El Campín
North America
May 28, 2005	New York	United States	Madison Square Garden
May 29, 2005	Miami	United States	American Airlines Arena
June 26, 2005	Boston	United States	Agganis Arena
Europe
July 2, 2005	Roskilde	Denmark	Roskilde Festival
July 5, 2005	Rotherdam	Netherlands	Ahoy
July 8, 2005	Badalona	Spain	Palau Municipal d'Esports de Badalona
July 12, 2005	Madrid	Spain	Auditorio del Parque Juan Carlos I
July 19, 2005 (Note: This concert was part of Latinoamericando Expo 2005)	Assago	Italy	FilaForum di Assago
Latin America
December 17, 2005	Santo Domingo	Dominican Republic	Felix Sanchez Olympic Stadium
February 22, 2006 (Note: This concert was part of 2006 International song festival)	Viña del Mar	Chile	Quinta Vergara

=== Box office data ===
City	Country	Attendance	Box office
San Juan	Puerto Rico	23,252 / 25,732 (90%)	$1,315,035
New York	United States	13,773 / 14,210 (97%)	$807,740
Total		23,252 / 25,732 (90%)	$1,315,035
