= Corazón Enamorado =

Single by Juan Luis Guerra

from the album Literal
- Released: April 26, 2019
- Genre: Bachata
- Length: 3:09
- Label: Universal Music Latin
- Songwriter: Juan Luis Guerra

Juan Luis Guerra singles chronology
"Kitipun" (2019)	"Corazón Enamorado" (2019)	"I Love You More" (2019)

"Corazon Enamorado" (A Heart in Love) is a song by Juan Luis Guerra, released on April 26, 2019 as the second single from his fourteenth studio album Literal.

== Charts ==
Chart (2019)	Peak position
Dominican Republic (Monitor Latino)	1
Ecuador (National-Report)	31
