= Mambo 23 =

Single by Juan Luis Guerra

from the EP Radio Güira
- Released: September 22, 2023
- Recorded: 2023
- Genre: Bachata; merengue; merengue de calle; Latin trap
- Length: 3:20
- Label: Rimas
- Songwriter: Juan Luis Guerra
- Producers: Juan Luis Guerra; Janina Rosado

Juan Luis Guerra singles chronology
| "Vale La Pena (Live)" (2021) | "Mambo 23" (2023) |

"Mambo 23" is a song by Dominican musician Juan Luis Guerra, released as the lead single from Guerra's second EP, Radio Güira. It was released on September 22, 2023, by Rimas Entertainment. The track marked the first time that Guerra ventured into mambo merengue or merengue de calle (urban merengue) and Latin trap. The song include a fusion of bachata, trap and merengue with arrangements of saxophones, trumpets, trombones, and classical instruments with influences of Dominican dembow and trap music. The music video was directed by Guerra's oldest son, Jean Gabriel Guerra.

The song was written and produced by Juan Luis Guerra and Janina Rosado, contains lyrics about situations on the streets, and makes references to Christianity and redemption. The song was met with positive reviews by media, fans and critics for its lyrics and contagious rhythm.

The track reached the top 5 on airplay charts in Puerto Rico and the Dominican Republic. It also reached the top spot on the US Billboard Tropical Airplay, becoming Guerra's 12th number one on the chart and his first track to do so in nine years, since "Tus Besos" (2014).

"Mambo 23" won Record of the Year and Best Tropical Song at the 25th Annual Latin Grammy Awards. The Music Video won Video of the Year at the 2024 Soberano Awards.

== Charts ==
| Chart (2023) | Peak position |
|---|---|
| Dominican Republic Airplay (Monitor Latino) | 2 |
| Dominican Republic Merengue Airplay (Monitor Latino) | 1 |
| Puerto Rico Airplay (Monitor Latino) | 5 |
| Suriname (Nationale Top 40) | 16 |
| US Latin Airplay (Billboard) | 21 |
| US Tropical Airplay (Billboard) | 1 |
