= Captain Avispa =

- Theatrical release poster
- Spanish: Capitán Avispa
- Directed by: Jean Gabriel Guerra; Jonnathan Melendez
- Screenplay by: Gustavo Lopez; Miguel Yarull
- Based on: "Las Avispas" by Juan Luis Guerra
- Produced by: Amarilys Germán; Juan Luis Guerra
- Starring: Luis Fonsi
- Edited by: Geu Florentino Gómez
- Music by: Juan Luis Guerra
- Production company: Guerra Toons
- Distributed by: Caribbean Films Distribution
- Release dates: April 1, 2024 (Santo Domingo); April 4, 2024 (Dominican Republic)
- Running time: 96 minutes
- Country: Dominican Republic
- Language: Spanish
- Budget: RD$128.5 million

Captain Avispa (Spanish: Capitán Avispa) is a 2024 Dominican animated superhero film directed by Jean Gabriel Guerra and Jonnathan Melendez (in their directorial debut) from a screenplay written by Miguel Yarull and Gustavo López, based on an idea by Jean Gabriel's father, Juan Luis Guerra inspired by his own song "Las Avispas". It was the highest-grossing film of 2024 in the Dominican Republic. It is considered the most expensive Dominican film ever produced, based on its reported production budget.

== Synopsis ==
Superhero Captain Avispa is charged with protecting Avispatrópolis and the Honey Kingdom. However, when his evil arch-enemy, the hornet Jacques Puasón, hatches a plan to take over the colonies, Captain Avispa must fight him while upholding his values.

== Voice cast ==
The actors participating in this film are:

- Luis Fonsi as Captain Avispa
- Joy Huerta as Honey Bee
- Juanes as Sergeant Picadura
- Karen Martínez as Ximena Colmena
- José Guillermo Cortines as Jacques Puasón / Bobby Flashington / Máximo Waxon / DJ
- Adalgisa Pantaleon as Queen Ada
- Roger Zayas as Mayor Panales
- Amelia Vega as Polibya Néctar
- Bianca García as Aki Teriyaki
- Héctor Aníbal as Mínimo Waxon
- Edwin Sánchez as Bombo Peluca
- Juan Luis Guerra as Leo Vespa / Juan Miel Guerra
- Paulina Guerra as Worker Bee

== Production ==
In 2019, Juan Luis Guerra announced his foray into filmmaking as a producer with the development of an animated feature. The film was produced remotely amid the COVID-19 pandemic. It required 600 hours of sound mixing.

== Release ==
Captain Avispa had its world premiere on April 1, 2024, at the Downtown Center in Santo Domingo, followed by a wide national theatrical release on April 4.

== Reception ==
=== Box office ===
In its opening weekend, it attracted 26,800 viewers, becoming the fifth-best opening for an animated film in the Dominican Republic, and ending its first week with more than 30,000 viewers.

The film attracted a total of 150,976 viewers throughout its theatrical run in Dominican theaters. It was the highest-grossing dominican film of 2024 with RD$46.8 million. In its opening week in Colombia, it grossed $46,750, ranking as the 6th highest-grossing film of the week. Over its first five weeks, it eventually earned more than $95,000.

=== Accolades ===
Award / Festival	Date of ceremony	Category	Recipient(s)	Result	Ref.
Soberano Awards	25 March 2025	Best Film - Drama	Juan Luis Guerra	Nominated	
Platino Awards	27 April 2025	Best Animated Film	Captain Avispa	Nominated	

== Future ==
In September 2024, during an interview with Diario Libre, producer Juan Luis Guerra confirmed that he is working on a sequel: "We are trying to have a second part and, above all, develop that industry (animation) here in the Dominican Republic."
