= Todo Tiene Su Hora =

Studio album by Juan Luis Guerra
- Released: November 11, 2014
- Genre: Latin, merengue, bachata, salsa
- Length: 31:44
- Label: Capitol Latin/Universal Music Latin Entertainment
- Producer: Juan Luis Guerra

Juan Luis Guerra chronology
A Son de Guerra Tour (2013)	Todo Tiene Su Hora (2014)	Literal (2019)

Singles from Todo Tiene Su Hora
- 1. "Tus Besos" Released: August 19, 2014; 2. "Todo Tiene Su Hora" Released: January 15, 2015; 3. "Muchachita Linda" Released: May 26, 2015

Todo Tiene Su Hora (Everything Has Its Time) is the 13th studio album by Dominican singer-songwriter Juan Luis Guerra and his band 4.40. It was released on November 11, 2014, by Capitol Latin and was produced by Juan Luis Guerra & Janina Rosado. Like his previous albums, the album is composed by variety of tropical music genres such as bachata, merengue, salsa and son but with different instrumentation normally used in classical music such as strings and violins. Guerra described the album as "innovative" and explored lyrics raging from love and romance to social conscience and protest against political corruption. The record encompassed elements of funk and jazz with merengue and classical music with bachata.

Todo Tiene Su Hora met with critical acclaim from critics. It won three awards at the 16th Annual Latin Grammy Awards including Album of the Year and received a nomination for Best Tropical Latin Album at the 58th Annual Grammy Awards. In 2016, it was nominated for Album of the Year at the Lo Nuestro Awards 2016 and Tropical Album of the Year at the 2015 Latin Billboard Music Awards. The album was supported by three official singles: Tus Besos, Todo Tiene Su Hora and Muchachita Linda.

Todo Tiene Su Hora debuted at the top of the US Billboard Top Latin Albums and Tropical Albums. It also debuted at number 65 on the Billboard 200 and charted in the Top 20 in Spain and Argentina. It was certified platinum and gold in Colombia, Peru, Costa Rica, Spain, and Central America. The album sold nearly half a million copies. To promote the album, Guerra embarked on the commercially successful world concert tour titled Todo Tiene Su Hora Tour.

== Background ==
On December 12, 2013, Guerra wrapped up his A Son de Guerra Tour in Zapopan, Mexico. In early 2014, the recording sessions for the album began. On April 21, 2014, it was reveled to the press had a collaboration included at Luis Fonsi album 8. Eventually, the track titled "Llegaste tu" was released on August 30, 2014. On August 26, 2014, the first single "Tus Besos" was officially released. Later, on September 6, 2014, the title was released to the press and social media. According to Guerra himself, it was the best album that he had recorded so far. On October 10, 2014, he revealed the cover of the album and at 14 of the same month the album set to be preordered on iTunes. Also, it was announced that Guerra had signed an exclusive contract with Universal Music Publishing Group. On October 15, 2014, Guerra revealed by surprise through social media, that he had recorded a song "Moca a Paris" with merengue legendary artist Jhonny Ventura.

== Reception ==
=== Commercial performance ===
In the United States, the album debuted at number 65 on the U.S. Billboard 200 and at number one on the Billboard Top Latin Albums chart, selling 6,000 copies in its first week. In Spain, the album peaked at number 16 on the Spanish Albums Chart and received an album gold certification by the PROMISCAE. In Argentina, the album reached the top 20. In just two days of being released the album reached the top 10 on iTunes in 20 territories. It sold 400,000 copies worldwide.

=== Critical reception ===
Professional ratings
Review scores
Source	Rating
AllMusic	5/5 stars

AllMusic gave the album a positive review and wrote that "Todo Tiene Su Hora is as consistent as it is adventurous; it ranks easily among Guerra's finest recordings, and reveals that even after 30 years, he is able to break new ground while remaining readily accessible to longtime fans".

== Credits and personnel ==
The following credits are from AllMusic and from the Todo Tiene Su Hora liner notes:

Juan Luis Guerra y 440

- Juan Luis Guerra – vocals, guitar
- Daniel Pena – saxophone
- Patricia Bonilla – trombone
- Janina Rosado – piano, chrous
- Esar Simó – Contrabass
- Juan De La Cruz - Bongos, Conga Drum, Tambora
- Pedro Peralta– congas
- Rafael Martinez – güira
- Isidro Bobadilla – percussion
- Adalgisa Pantaleon – vocals
- Juan Rizek - chorus
- Roger Zayas - Chorus

Additional personnel

- Adam Ayan – Mastering
- Ivana De La Cruz – Chorus
- Willy De La Cruz – French Horn
- Jose Fléte – Trombone
- Paulina Guerra – chorus
- Alberto Iznaga – Viola
- Juan Pablo Polanco – Cello
- Allan Leschorn – Mixing
- Priscila Maltés – chorus
- Mayreni Morel – Viola
- Joel Rosario – Saxophone
- Milena Zivkovic – Cello

== Track listing ==
All tracks are written by Juan Luis Guerra.

No.	Title	Length
1.	"Cookies & Cream"	3:30
2.	"Tus Besos"	3:17
3.	"Canto a Colombia"	3:13
4.	"Todo Tiene Su Hora"	3:17
5.	"Dime Nora Mía"	3:08
6.	"Para Que Sepas"	2:22
7.	"El Capitán"	3:14
8.	"Muchachita Linda"	3:24
9.	"Todo Pasa"	3:12
10.	"De Moca a París" (featuring Johnny Ventura)	3:10

== Charts ==
=== Weekly charts ===
Chart (2014)	Peak position
Argetinan Albums (CAPIF)	20
Spanish Albums (PROMUSICAE)	16
US Billboard 200	65
US Top Latin Albums (Billboard)	1
US Tropical Albums (Billboard)	1

=== Year-end charts ===
Chart (2014)	Position
US Tropical Albums (Billboard)	8
Chart (2015)	Position
Spanish Albums (PROMUSICAE)	83

== Sales and certifications ==
Region	Certification	Certified units/sales
Colombia (ASINCOL)	Gold	
Costa Rica	Platinum	
Peru	Diamond	
Spain (PROMUSICAE)	Gold	20,000^{‡}
Summaries
Central America (CFC)	Gold	
^{‡} Sales+streaming figures based on certification alone.

== See also ==
- List of number-one Billboard Latin Albums from the 2010s
- List of number-one Billboard Tropical Albums from the 2010s
