= Literal Tour Grandes Éxitos =

2019 concert tour by Juan Luis Guerra

- Tour by Juan Luis Guerra
- Associated album: Literal (album)
- Start date: June 21, 2019
- End date: October 27, 2019
- Legs: 2
- No. of shows: 12

Juan Luis Guerra concert chronology
- Todo Tiene Su Hora Tour (2015-17); Literal Tour Grandes Éxitos (2019); Entre Mar y Palmeras Tour (2022)

Literal Tour Grandes Éxitos or simply Literal Tour is the world tour by the dominican artist Juan Luis Guerra to support his 14th studio album, Literal. The tour kick off on June 21, 2019 in Valencia, Spain and ended in Orlando, Florida on October 27, 2019. The tour visited seven cities in the United States. The tour was planned to continue in 2020, however, it was cancelled due the COVID-19 pandemic.

== Overview ==
Tommy Calle of the Los Angeles Times gave a positive review to the concert in Los Angeles and wrote "The Dominican singer set up the party at Microsoft with his merengue, salsa and bachata classics before a heterogeneous audience that put aside reggaeton and regional". Also, he stated that the attendance was 7,000. In the same way, Marcos Torres from Houston Press, praised the concert at the city and title his review "Juan Luis Guerra Turns Smart Financial Centre into a Tropical Dance Party". Also, it was his first time ever performing at venue and the city.

In Madrid, it was reported that 15,000 sold out the venue and 12,000 in Bogota. The concert in Miami receive positive by the media was crownded with 13,000 fans. The concert in Panama was reported sold out.

== Tour dates ==
| Date | City | Country | Venue |
Europe
| June 21, 2019 | Valencia | Spain | Marina Sur Auditorium |
| June 24, 2019 | Barcelona | Spain | Palau Sant Jordi |
| June 27, 2019 | Madrid | Spain | WiZink Center |
Leg 2- Latin America and United States
| September 19, 2019 | Panama City | Panama | Estadio Rommel Fernández |
| September 21, 2019 | Bogota | Colombia | Movistar Arena |
| September 26, 2019 | Boston | United States | Agganis Arena |
| September 28, 2019 | Newark | United States | Prudential Center |
| October 5, 2019 | Miami | United States | American Airlines Arena |
| October 18, 2019 | Houston | United States | Smart Financial Centre |
| October 20, 2019 | Los Angeles | United States | Microsoft Theater |
| October 25, 2019 | Washington D.C | United States | Eagle Bank Arena |
| October 27, 2019 | Orlando | United States | Amway Center |

== Cancelled Shows ==
List of cancelled concerts, showing date, city, country, venue, and reason for cancellation
| Date | City | Country | Venue | Reason |
|---|---|---|---|---|
| May 23, 2020 | Punta Cana | Dominican Republic | Fillmore Hall at Hard Rock Cafe & Casino | COVID-19 Pandemic |
| June 27, 2020 | Punta Cana | Dominican Republic | Fillmore Hall at Hard Rock Cafe & Casino | COVID-19 Pandemic |
| July 11, 2020 | Punta Cana | Dominican Republic | Fillmore Hall at Hard Rock Cafe & Casino | COVID-19 Pandemic |
| August 29, 2020 | Punta Cana | Dominican Republic | Fillmore Hall at Hard Rock Cafe & Casino | COVID-19 Pandemic |
| September 19, 2020 | Punta Cana | Dominican Republic | Fillmore Hall at Hard Rock Cafe & Casino | COVID-19 Pandemic |
| October 17, 2020 | Punta Cana | Dominican Republic | Fillmore Hall at Hard Rock Cafe & Casino | COVID-19 Pandemic |
| December 12, 2020 | Santo Domingo | Dominican Republic | Felix Sanchez Olympic Stadium | COVID-19 Pandemic |
