= La Travesia Tour =

2008–09 concert tour by Juan Luis Guerra

La Travesía Tour
- Tour by Juan Luis Guerra
- Associated album: La Llave de Mi Corazón
- Start date: July 12, 2008
- End date: December 5, 2009
- Legs: 6
- No. of shows: 54
- Attendance: 250,000+

Juan Luis Guerra concert chronology
- Tour 20 años (2004–06); La Travesía Tour (2008–09); A Son de Guerra World Tour (2011–13)

La Travesia World Tour (English: The Journey Tour) is the world tour by the Dominican superstar Juan Luis Guerra Tour promote his 10th studio album La Llave de Mi Corazón. It was his longest tour at the time and consisted in six legs, 54 shows and visited United States, Latin America, Europe and Asia, where his made his debut in Japan. Also, it was his biggest international tour in more than a decade, marking his first time in many years that he performed in countries such as Ecuador, Paraguay and Costa Rica since the Bachata Rosa World Tour (1991-92). The tour kick off on July 12, 2008, and ended on December 5, 2009, in Amsterdam, Netherlands.

== Overview ==
In Puerto Rico, the first show reported an attendance of 15,000 fans. The first ten concerts in had a total attendance of 100,000 fans. The attendance in Barcelona concert was 10,000. The concerts in Spain had a total attendance of 150,000. On the Latin American Leg, His presetantion in Costa Rica was his first concert in the country in 16 years and had a reported attendance of 8,000. In Venezuela, the concert in Caracas was reported sold out. His concert in natal Santo Domingo, Dominican Republic had attendance of 56,000, the biggest attendance by a Dominican solo artist at the venue. In Chile, the concert was oversaw by 14,000 fans.

On the second Latin American Leg, the concert in Guayaquil had an attendance of nearly 35,000 and more than 20,000 in Quito, it marked his first time performing in ten country in 13 years. In Lima, 15,000 fans show up for the concert. The concert in Bolivia was sold out one week before the show with 20,000 tickets sold. On the second leg in the United States, both concerts were reported sold out.

== Tour dates ==
Date	City	Country	Venue
Leg 1- North America
July 12, 2008	Miami	United States	American Airlines Arena
July 13, 2008	Orlando	United States	Amway Arena
July 16, 2008	Duluth	United States	Gas South Arena
July 18, 2008	New York	United States	Madison Square Garden
July 19, 2008	Mashantucket	United States	Grand Theater
July 31, 2008	Santa Ynez	United States	Chumash Casino
August 2, 2008	San Jose	United States	Event Center Arena
August 3, 2008	Los Angeles	United States	Microsoft Theater
August 8, 2008	San Juan	Puerto Rico	Coliseo de Puerto Rico
August 9, 2008	San Juan	Puerto Rico	Coliseo de Puerto Rico
Europe
August 20, 2008	A Coruña	Spain	Coliseum da Coruña
August 22, 2008 (Note: The concert was cohealind with Gloria Estefan)	Valencia	Spain	Formula 1 GrandPix
August 25, 2008	Lanzarote	Spain	Reducto Beach
August 27, 2008	Gran Carania	Spain	San Juan Auditorium
August 29, 2008	Tenerife	Spain	Campo de Futbol Adeje Tenerife
August 30, 2008 (Note: This concert was part of Expo Zaragoza 2008)	Zaragoza	Spain	Anfiteatro 43
September 1, 2008	Amsterdam	Netherlands	AFAS Live
September 4, 2008	Stockholm	Sweden	Annexet Arena
September 5, 2008	Drammen	Norway	Union Scene
September 9, 2008	Barcelona	Spain	Palau Sant Jordi
September 11, 2008	Madrid	Spain	Palacio de los Deportes
September 13, 2008	Valladolid	Spain	Plaza Mayor Vallisoletana
September 16, 2008	Paris	France	Olympia
Latin America
November 30, 2008	Panama City	Panama	Figali Convention Center
December 2, 2008	San Jose	Costa Rica	Estadio Alejandro Morera
December 4, 2008	Guatemala City	Guatemala	Estadio El Ejercito
December 6, 2008	San Salvador	El Salvador	Estadio Jorge Mágico González
December 11, 2008	Maracaibo	Venezuela	Palacio de los Eventos
December 13, 2008	Caracas	Venezuela	Poliedo de Caracas
February 14, 2009	Santo Domingo	Dominican Republic	Felix Sanchez Olympic Stadium
April 16, 2009	La Serena	Chile	Estadio La Portada
April 18, 2009	Santiago	Chile	Estadio Nacional
April 29, 2009	Medellin	Colombia	Plaza de Toros La Macarena
May 2, 2009	Bogota	Colombia	Campin Coliseum
May 4, 2009	Bogota	Colombia	Campin Coliseum
North America II
June 22, 2009	Hollywood	United States	Hard Rock Live!
June 27, 2009	New York	United States	Radio City Music Hall
Asia
August 9, 2009 (Note: This concert is part of the Isla Salsa Festival 2009)	Fukuoka	Japan	Isla de Salsa
August 11, 2009	Tokyo	Japan	Shinkiba Studio Cosat
Latin America II and Europe
August 29, 2009	Willemstad	Curazao	Rif Stadium
September 3, 2009	Santa Cruz	Bolivia	Estadio Tahuichi Aguilera
September 5, 2009	Lima	Peru	Explanada del Estadio Monumental
September 18, 2009 (Note: This Concert Co-Headlined by Don Omar and Jorge Celedón.)	Bucaramanga	Colombia	Estadio Alfonso López
September 19, 2009 (Note: This Concert Co-Headlined by Don Omar and Jorge Celedón.)	Cucuta	Colombia	Estadio General Santander
September 23, 2009	Quito	Ecuador	Rumñanui Coliseum
September 25, 2009	Guayaquil	Ecuador	Estadio Alberto Spencer
September 27, 2009	Cuenca	Ecuador	Estadio Alejandro Serrano
November 17, 2009 (Note: This concert was a private show to celebrate the anniversary of LAN Airlines.)	Santiago	Chile	Movistar Arena
November 20, 2009	Buenos Aires	Argentina	Estadio GEBA
November 21, 2009	Buenos Aires	Argentina	Estadio GEBA
November 22, 2009	Asuncion	Paraguay	Estadio Defensores del Chaco
November 26, 2009	Mérida	Mexico	Estadio Kukulkán
November 27, 2009	Mexico City	Mexico	Palacio de los Deportes
November 29, 2009	Veracruz	Mexico	Estadio de Beisbol Beto Avila
December 5, 2009	Rotherdam	Netherlands	Ahoy

=== Box office data ===
City	Country	Attendance	Box office
Miami	United States	10,829 / 10,829 (100%)	$814,905
New York	United States	10,243 / 10,243 (100%)	$810,540
San Juan	Puerto Rico	25,538 / 27,350 (93%)	$1,553,240
Total		21,072 / 21,072 (100%)	$1,625,445

== Cancelled concerts ==
List of cancelled concerts, showing date, city, country, venue, and reason for cancellation
Date	City	Country	Venue	Reason
December 2, 2008	Managua	Nicaragua	Estadio Nacional Denis Martinez	Unknown
