= A Son de Guerra =

Studio album by Juan Luis Guerra
- Released: June 8, 2010
- Recorded: 2009–2010
- Studios: JLG Studio (Santo Domingo, Dominican Republic); Ocean Way Recording; Studio City Sound (Hollywood, California)
- Genre: Merengue · bachata · tropical music
- Length: 36:53
- Label: Capitol Latin
- Producer: Juan Luis Guerra

Juan Luis Guerra chronology
La Llave de Mi Corazón (2007)	A Son de Guerra (2010)	Colección Cristiana (2012)

Singles from A Son de Guerra
- 1. "Bachata en Fukuoka" Released: March 22, 2010; 2. "Mi Bendición" Released: May 24, 2010; 3. "La Guagua" Released: July 12, 2010; 4. "La Calle (feat. Juanes)" Released: August 30, 2010; 5. "Lola's Mambo" Released: November 8, 2010; 6. "Apaga y Vámonos" Released: January 31, 2011; 7. "Son al Rey" Released: March 7, 2011

A Son de Guerra (transl. To The Beat Of War), sometimes referred to as Asondeguerra, is the 11th studio album recorded by Dominican singer-songwriter Juan Luis Guerra, It was released by Capitol Latin on June 8, 2010 (see 2010 in music). The album contains 11 tracks, and its musical structure and production are based on merengue, bachata, Son, Salsa, experimenting and incorporating elements of jazz, blues, funk, cumbia, rock, reggae, rap, and mambo. Lyrical themes on the album include protest against political corruption, immigration, love and romance. Featured appearances include Juanes and Chris Botti. For many fans and critics alike, it's his album with the most social content and strong social criticism since Areito (1992).

A Son de Guerra met with positive reviews by critics. It won three awards including Album of the Year on November 11, 2010, at the 11th Annual Latin Grammy Awards and was nominated Best Tropical Latin Album at 53rd Annual Grammy Awards. The album was support by six official singles: Bachata en Fukuoka which won Best Tropical Song at the 11th Latin Grammy Awards, Mi Bendicion, La Guagua, La Calle, Lola's Bambo and Apaga y Vamonos.

A Son de Guerra debuted at number one on the Billboard Tropical Albums. It remained the top-selling album on the chart for 9 weeks and was certified platinum (Latin field) in the United States by the Recording Industry Association of America (RIAA). It topped the charts in Spain and Uruguay and reached the top 10 in Chile, Colombia, Ecuador, Mexico, Peru and Venezuela. It was certified gold and platinum in Mexico and Venezuela. To promote the album, Guerra embarked on the A Son de Guerra World Tour. In 2013, Guerra released A Son de Guerra Tour, recorded live during the tour stop in Santo Domingo the previous year.

== Background and production ==
By the end of 2009, Guerra concluded his Travesia Tour which he performed in countries such as Japan for the first time. At the end of the tour, the artist stated that he wanted to do something different in comparison to his other works. By 2010, Juan Luis Guerra had sold over 20 million copies worldwide. On March 22, 2010, Guerra released the lead single "Bachata en Fukuoka" and he explained that he got the inspiration of the lyrics during his stop of his previous in the city of the same name in Japan.

On May 25, 2010, Guerra revealed to the press "Perhaps it is the most varied album in terms of musical genres, in others I have made two or three fusions, in this one I have made a deeper mix". Also, it explained first time he mixed seven music genres: bachata, merengue, mambo, jazz, cumbia, son and rock and also that he returned to do social content on his music.

== Musical style, writing and composition ==
The album contains 11 tracks in total. The opening track "No aparecen" is a romantic merengue. "La Guagua" is a son with elements of cumbia and guracha with a strong with a political message and is a reflection about the poverty and political corruption in Latin America. Mi bendicion is a bachata song that talks about the blessing of being love. "La Calle" feat Juanes, is a rock song with also contains social criticism. "Bachata en Fukuoka" is a romantic bachata song. "Apaga y Vamonos" is a merengue song that contains social criticism and reflects about how the poverty, corruption and poor conditions had stayed the same. "Son del Rey" is Christian song with an infectious Cuban son rhythm. Cayo Arena is a merengue with strong influences of jazz and blues.

"Arregla Los Papeles" is an intricate salsa that talks about immigration. "Lola's Mambo" is a salsa song with elements of mambo. Caribbean Blues is a Cuban son and is his first English language song since "Medicine for my soul" on his 10th studio album La Llave la de mi corazon.

== Critical reception ==
Professional ratings
Review scores
Source	Rating
Allmusic	4/5 stars

A Son de Guerra was one of the most anticipated Latin albums for the summer of 2010. The album was met with positive reviews. Jason Birchmeier of Allmusic gave the album a positive review, and while he felt that "there's nothing extravagant here", he stated that "every song is interesting from one standpoint or another."

At the 11th Latin Grammy Awards the album won three awards: Best Tropical Song, Best Contemporary Tropical Album and Album of the Year. At the 2011 Premio Lo Nuestro, he was the most nominated artist with six. Eventually he won the best merengue artist. At the 27th Annual Soberano Awards, previously Casandra awards, Guerra won two awards including the album of the year for A Son de Guerra. The album received a nomination for Best Tropical Latin Album at 53rd Annual Grammy Awards.

== Commercial performance ==
In the United States, A son de Guerra debuted at number two on the Billboard Top Latin Albums and number one Billboard Tropical Albums on the week of 26 June 2010. Also, It debuted at 52 on US Billboard 200. It was certified platinum (Latin field) by the RIAA for shipping 100,000 copies in the United States. In Mexico, the album peaked a number six and was certified gold for selling over 30,000 copies.

In Chile, it peaked at number 7 and number 6 in Colombia at albums retail charts. In Peru, it peaked at number 9 at the albums retail albums charts. In Spain, A son de Guerra debuted at number one on the albums charts and was certified gold. In Uruguay, the album debuted at number one at the album monthly charts. In Ecuador, the album reached number 5 on the retail charts and sold over 5,000 copies. In Venezuela, it reached number 2 at the albums retail charts and was certified platinum.

== Credits and personnel ==
- Adam Ayan – mastering
- Patricio Bonilla – trombone
- David Channing – engineer
- Vinnie Colaiuta – drums
- Juan De La Cruz – bongos, conga, maracas, Timbals, guiro
- Abednego DeLos Santos – electric bass
- Jose Fléte – trombone
- Rafael "Rafo" German – guira
- Juan Luis Guerra – producer, arrangements
- Jeremías King – electric bass
- Rafael Lazzaro – engineer
- Allan Leschhorn – engineer
- Luis Mansilla – engineer
- Adalgisa Pantaleon – chorus
- Apolinar Peralta – trombone
- Juan Rizek – Chorus
- Frank Rodriguez – assistant engineer
- Janina Rosado – piano, producer, engineer, chorus, synth
- Allen Sides – engineer
- Ruben Toribio – electric bass
- Carlos Torres – trombone
- David Torres – mixing assistant
- Ronnie Torres – engineer, mixing, mastering supervisor
- Roger Zayas – chorus

== Tracklist ==
All tracks are written by Juan Luis Guerra.

No.	Title	Length
1.	"No Aparecen"	3:16
2.	"La Guagua"	3:23
3.	"Mi Bendición"	3:08
4.	"La Calle (featuring Juanes)"	3:34
5.	"Bachata en Fukuoka"	3:11
6.	"Apaga y Vámonos"	3:15
7.	"Son al Rey"	3:32
8.	"Cayo Arena"	3:24
9.	"Arregla los Papeles"	3:33
10.	"Lola's Mambo (featuring Chris Botti)"	3:00
11.	"Caribbean Blues"	3:35

== Chart performance ==
Chart (2010–2011)	Peak Position
Chilean Albums Chart	7
Colombian Albums Chart	3
Ecuadorian Albums (Musicalisimo)	5
Mexican Albums Chart	6
Mexican International Chart Albums	11
Spanish Albums Chart	1
Peruan Albums Chart	9
US Billboard 200	52
U.S. Billboard Top Latin Albums	2
U.S. Billboard Latin Tropical Albums	1
Uruguayan Albums (CUD)	1
Venezuelan Albums (Recordland)	2

== Sales and certifications ==
Region	Certification	Certified units/sales
Ecuador	—	5,000
Mexico (AMPROFON)	Gold	30,000^{^}
Spain (Promusicae)	Gold	30,000^{^}
United States (RIAA)	Platinum (Latin)	100,000^{^}
Venezuela	Platinum	
^{^} Shipments figures based on certification alone.

== See also ==
- List of number-one albums of 2010 (Spain)
- List of number-one Billboard Tropical Albums of 2010
