= Literal (album) =

Studio album by Juan Luis Guerra
- Released: 31 May 2019
- Recorded: 2018–2019
- Studios: Abbey Road Studio 2 London, United Kingdom; JLG Studios (Santo Domingo, Dominican Republic)
- Genres: Merengue; salsa; bachata
- Length: 34:22
- Label: Universal Music Latin
- Producer: Juan Luis Guerra

Juan Luis Guerra chronology
Todo Tiene Su Hora (2014)	Literal (2019)	Privé (2020)

Singles from Literal
- 1. "Kitipun" Released: 5 April 2019; 2. "Corazón Enamorado" Released: 26 April 2019; 3. "I Love You More" Released: 10 May 2019; 4. "Lámpara Pa' Mis Pies" Released: 30 August 2019

Literal is the 14th studio album (16th overall) by Dominican singer, songwriter and producer Juan Luis Guerra. It was released on 31 May 2019 by Universal Music Latin. Written and produced by Juan Luis Guerra, the album contains eleven tracks and encompasses a variety of tropical genres, such as bachata, merengue, salsa and son along with influences from jazz, gospel, rock and Dominican folk music. The album was co-produced by Guerra's longtime collaboration and musical director Janina Rosado. It has lyrics about romance, love, nostalgia, moving on and protest against corruption.

Recorded between Abbey Road Studios in London, United Kingdom and Guerra's own studio in Santo Domingo, Literal provides musical interpolations along with retro and modern sounds. In much the same way that his 1994 album, Fogaraté includes a bachata adaptation of the Lacrimosa movement from Mozart's Requiem Mass in D Minor and "I Love You More" which interpolates sections from, or is otherwise influenced by, Franz Liszt's Hungarian Rhapsody No. 2.

Literal was one of Latin music's most awarded and critically-praised tropical releases of 2019. It won Best Contemporany Tropical/Tropical Fusion Album and Best Tropical Song at the 20th Annual Latin Grammy Awards on November 14, 2019. Also, it was for nomintated for Best Tropical Latin Album at the 61st Annual Grammy Awards. The album was supported with the released of four singles: Kitipun, Corazon Enamorado, I Love You More and Lámpara Pa' mis pies. Literal debuted at the Top 20 of the albums charts in Spain and Argentina and Tropical in the United States. To promote the album, Guerra went on the Literal Grandes Exitos Tour.

== Background ==
On March 19, 2019, Juan Luis Guerra performed at the closing performance of the Tenerife Carnival. The concert had a record attendance of 400,000 people, breaking the record of the highest attendance at the carnaval previously held by Celia Cruz with 240,000 in 1987. On March 23, 2019, Guerra posted on Instagram the cover of the new single and the release day. The track was premiered with a music video directed by Taba Blanchard and a dance challenge. On April 23, 2019, Guerra announced his next tour as Literal Grandes Exitos Tour.

On April 25, 2019, Guerra received a Lifetime Achievement Awards following a tribute at the 2019 Billboard Latin Music Awards. Shortly before the ceremony, the title of the album was released to the press. On May 2, 2019, the cover and release day were given to the press. Latter, the artist explain that he came up with the title because his daughter used that word for almost everything.

== Recording, musical style, and composition ==
Recording sessions for Literal took one year between 2018 and 2019. One of the studios used to record the album was the Abbey Road Studio in London. It has the composition, musicalization, arrangements and production of Juan Luis Guerra and the co-production of Janina Rosado.

The first musical cut of this album, "Kitipun", was released on April 5. It is a romantic bachata with innovative sound. "Lampara Pa` Mis Pies", is tropical carnival dance music (and a love song to Guerra's wife and with references to Christianity), a merengue with group-chanted choruses that touch on South African township jive and Nigerian highlife."Cantando Bachata" flirts with '60s rock and '80s funk in its backbeat as slippery, infectious bachata rhythms embrace them both amid gorgeous stacked vocal harmonies and swinging R&B horns. The following track "Ma Pa Lante Vive Gente" is an old school salsa number. "I Love You More" is a celebratory merengue that interpolates Franz Liszt's Hungarian Rhapsody No. 2.

"Corazon Enamorado" is a romantic Bachata with typical Guerra sound. "Son a Mamá" with its muted mariachi trumpet, decoratively charted horns, passionately chanted choral vocals, and bubbling bongos, congas, and timbales. "Esto No Tiene Madre" is percussive trova-rock social cut with references to social injustices. "Me Preguntas" is a ballad melding bachata and bolero. "El Primer Baile" is worthy of its translation as "the first dance." Its structure is panoramic: It melds jazz, bachata, pop, and smooth Latin soul along with retro merengue sound. "Merengue de Cuna" is a track dedicated to his older son, Jean Guerra.

== Critical reception ==
Professional ratings
Review scores
Source	Rating
AllMusic	4/5 stars
Rolling Stone	(Positive)
Billboard	(Positive)

Literal was one of Latin Music's most awarded & Critically-Praised Tropical releases of 2019 cited at the top 10 or best Latin albums of 2019. AllMusic gave the album four of five stars and wrote "Bears the hallmarks of Guerra's sophisticated artistry, but rendered with abundant tenderness, intimacy, and joy …Literal is Brilliant…an unabashedly romantic yet poetically poignant record."

Isabelia Herrera from Rolling Stone gave a positive review to the album titled "Bachata Legend Juan Luis Guerra Fights Nostalgia on New Album, ‘Literal’". On the review she stated "The Bachata Legend who revolutionized the genre…continues to experiment on his new LP — but he's still endearingly himself - It's in the little details that Literal shines brightest."

Judy Cantor-Navar from Billboard gave a positive review to the album and wrote "From the godfather of contemporary tropical music... a life-loving, set whose arrangements are an instant pick-me-up, a mood-enhancing answer to today's global blues" in a more complete review about guerra life achievement award, Houston Press wrote "simply one of the most dynamic, emotional, and complete musicians in all of the Americas, ever…a true music genius".

== Commercial performance ==
In the United States, Literal debuted at number 31 on the Billboard Top Latin Albums and number seven Billboard Tropical Albums on the week of June 15, 2019 selling over 2,000 units.Literal was Guerra's 17th straight top 10 at the Tropical Charts, debut dating back to La Bilirubina, which opened at No. 2 on the June 30, 1990-dated list. Also, Literal’s was driven mostly by album sales, which sparks up the set's start at No. 3 on the Latin Albums Sales chart. It debut a number 15 in Argentina retail albums charts according to Prensario and number 17 at the Spanish Albums Charts.

== Track listing ==
All tracks are written by Juan Luis Guerra.

No.	Title	Length
1.	"Kitipun"	3:35
2.	"Lámpara Pa' Mis Pies"	3:00
3.	"Cantando Bachata"	2:59
4.	"Ma' Pa' Lante Vive Gente"	3:19
5.	"I Love You More"	3:16
6.	"Corazón Enamorado"	3:09
7.	"Son A Mama"	3:04
8.	"No Tiene Madre"	3:23
9.	"Me Preguntas"	3:03
10.	"El Primer Baile"	3:31
11.	"Merengue de Cuna"	2:03
Total length:		34:22

== Charts ==
=== Weekly charts ===
Chart (2019)	Peak position
Argetinan Albums (Prensario)	15
Spanish Albums (PROMUSICAE)	17
US Top Latin Albums (Billboard)	31
US Tropical Albums (Billboard)	7

=== Year-end charts ===
Chart (2019)	Position
US Top Latin Albums (Billboard)	99
