= Areíto World Tour =

1993 concert tour by Juan Luis Guerra

Areito World Tour
- Tour by Juan Luis Guerra
- Associated album: Areíto
- Start date: July 3, 1993
- End date: October 16, 1993
- Legs: 3
- No. of shows: 40

Juan Luis Guerra concert chronology
- Bachata Rosa World Tour (1991–92); Areíto World Tour (1993); El Niagara en Bicicleta Tour (1999–2000)

Areíto World Tour is the second world tour by Dominican merengue superstar Juan Luis Guerra to promote his sixth studio album Areíto (1992). Consisting of three legs, covering the United States, South America and Europe, the tour started on July 3, 1993, at Radio City Music Hall in New York and ended on October 16, 1993, at Rotterdam Ahoy in the Netherlands. The tour marked Guerra's first concerts in Brazil, Portugal and the Netherlands.

Sponsored by soft drink Bitter Kas, it was Guerra's most intense tour at the time, performing over 40 shows on three months including nearly 30 shows in Spain. Following the end of the tour, Guerra announced his retirement from doing public presentations.

The Areíto Tour was the artist’s final tour before his temporary retirement from the stage. In 1995, he performed two concerts to promote his album Fogaraté. He formally returned to live performances in 1999 with a short concert tour titled El Niagara en Bicicleta Tour. It was not until 2004 that Guerra embarked on another full world tour, celebrating 20 years of his career.

== Background ==
On July 4, 1992, Guerra announced that he would cancel the last leg of his Bachata Rosa World Tour to focus on recording a new album and release something fresh to the fans. Guerra also suffered an eye affliction and had surgery to correct it. Areíto was released on December 8, 1992, in the US and over two million of copies were shipped worldwide, one of the largest initial shipments ever for a Spanish-language album.

John Lannert from the Artist & Music section of Billboard announced that the tour had 40 stops in the United States, Brazil, Chile, Argentina, England, and Germany. The tour was produced by Water Brother Productions. However, the concerts in England, Germany, Venezuela and Peru did not materialize for unknown reasons. Guerra travelled with 18 musicians, 10 engineers, smoke machines and video screens.

== Reception ==
=== Critical reception ===
The tour received positive reviews by critics. Wilma Randle from the Chicago Tribune attended the concert at the Chicago Theater and wrote a positive review highlighting the setlist and energy on the stage. Enrique Lopetegui from the Los Angeles Times praised the concert at the Greek Theater in an article titled "Guerra Gives Fans Satisfying Show".

=== Commercial reception ===
Ticket prices for the US concerts ranged between $30 and $40. However, for the concert in Los Angeles tickets were up to $47. The concerts in the United States reported great attendance. The concerts at New York's Radio City Music Hall were reported sold out. The concert at the Greek Theater in Los Angeles was not sold out, however, a large crowd were reported in the venue. However, attendance at 9 July show at the James L. Knight Center in Miami was disappointing, 4,000 of the 6,000 seats, significantly less than the sold-out show in Miami Arena on the Bachata Rosa Tour in December 1991.

In Argentina, he performed at the Estadio Obras in Buenos Aires from 23 to 25 July, with three sold-out shows.

In Spain, the tour visited 20 cities. Some cities had a second show due the high demand. The Madrid concerts on 14 and 15 September at Las Vegas were sold out with attendance of 40,000 fans and 9,000 fans at Sevilla on 22 September concert. The two concerts in Barcelona at the Palau Sant Jordi on 5 and 6 October were sold out with 41,644 seats. The concert at Colegio La Salle at Puerto Real had a total attendance of 10,000 fans.The concert at the La Romareda in Zaragoza on 10 October had an attendance of 28,541 (of 30,000 seats) and the Las Palmas concert on 30 September at the Insular Stadium had attendance of 18,517 (of 20,000). Over 16,000 attended the concerts at Palacio de Conciertos y Granada. In the Netherlands, the concert in the Ahoy in Rotterdam on 16 October was sold out, with over 10,000 tickets sold, becoming the first merengue artist to do so.

== Tour dates ==
Date	City	Country	Venue
North America
July 2, 1993	New York City	United States	Radio City Music Hall
July 3, 1993	New York City	United States	Radio City Music Hall
July 4, 1993	New York City	United States	Radio City Music Hall
July 9, 1993	Miami	United States	James L. Knight Center
July 10, 1993	Chicago	United States	Chicago Theater
July 11, 1993	Los Angeles	United States	Greek Theater
South America
July 21, 1993	Santiago	Chile	Arena Santiago
July 23, 1993	Buenos Aires	Argentina	Estadio Obras
July 24, 1993	Buenos Aires	Argentina	Estadio Obras
July 25, 1993	Buenos Aires	Argentina	Estadio Obras
August 7, 1993	Lima	Peru	
August 10, 1993	São Paulo	Brasil	Olympia
August 11, 1993	São Paulo	Brasil	Olympia
August 12, 1993	Rio de Janeiro	Brasil	Hotel Rio Grande
August 14, 1993	Caracas	Venezuela	Poliedro de Caracas
Europe
August 26, 1993	Benidorm	Spain	Plaza De Toros
August 28, 1993	Malaga	Spain	Plaza de Toros Malaga
August 29, 1993	Puerto Real	Spain	Colegio Lasalle
August 30, 1993	Granada	Spain	Palacio de los Conciertos
August 31, 1993	Granada	Spain	Palacio de los Conciertos
September 3, 1993	Bilbao	Spain	Plaza de Toros Vista Alegre
September 4, 1993	Gijon	Spain	Hipodromo
September 6, 1993	A Coruña	Spain	Coliseum da Coruña
September 7, 1993	Ourense	Spain	Plazo Paca Paz
September 10, 1993	Cascais	Portugal	Plaza de Toros
September 11, 1993	Almendralejo	Spain	Plaza de Toros
September 12, 1993	Guadalajara	Spain	Plaza de Toros
September 14, 1993	Madrid	Spain	Plaza de Toros Las Vegas
September 15, 1993	Madrid	Spain	Plaza de Toros Las Vegas
September 18, 1993	Tenerife	Spain	Estadio Municipal Francisco Peraza
September 22, 1993	Serville	Spain	Auditorio Padro de San Sebastian
September 23, 1993	Serville	Spain	Auditorio Padro de San Sebastian
September 25, 1993	Cordoba	Spain	Plaza de Toros
September 28, 1993	Valencia	Spain	Plaza de Toros
September 30, 1993	Las Palmas	Spain	Insular Stadium
October 5, 1993	Barcelona	Spain	Palau Sant Jordi
October 6, 1993	Barcelona	Spain	Palau Sant Jordi
October 8, 1993	Murcia	Spain	Plaza de Toros de Murcia
October 9, 1993	Alicante	Spain	
October 11, 1993	Zaragoza	Spain	Estadio La Romareda
October 16, 1993	Rotherdam	Netherlands	Ahoy

=== Box office data ===
City	Country	Attendance	Box office
Barcelona	Spain	41,644 / 41,644 (100%)	$798,516
Zaragoza	Spain	28,541 / 30,000 (95%)	$438,141
Las Palmas	Spain	18,517 / 20,000 (93%)	$351,895
Total		88,702 / 91,644 (97%)	$1,588,552
