= La Llave de Mi Corazón =

Studio album by Juan Luis Guerra
- Released: March 20, 2007
- Recorded: 2006–07
- Studios: Circle House (Miami, Florida); Chocolab Midi, JLG (Santo Domingo, Dominican Republic)
- Genres: Merengue; salsa; bachata
- Length: 44:53
- Label: EMI Televisa Music
- Producer: Juan Luis Guerra

Juan Luis Guerra chronology
| Para Tí (2004) | La Llave de Mi Corazón (2007) | A Son de Guerra (2010) |

La Llave de Mi Corazon: Special Edition

Singles from La Llave de Mi Corazón
- 1. "La Llave de Mi Corazón" Released: January 22, 2007; 2. "Que Me Des Tu Cariño" Released: May 7, 2007; 3. "La Travesía" Released: August 13, 2007; 4. "Como Yo" Released: January 14, 2008; 5. "Sólo Tengo Ojos Para Tí" Released: March 31, 2008

La Llave de Mi Corazón (transl. The Key of My Heart) is the 10th studio album recorded by Dominican singer-songwriter Juan Luis Guerra, It was released by EMI Televisa Music on March 20, 2007. It was Guerra's first album to contain songs in English ("Something is Good" and "Medicine for my Soul") since his 1994 recording of Fogarate. The album contains fusions of mambo and tropical rhythms that Guerra himself defined as "Mambo merengue". Its production and musical structure of album is based on merengue, bachata and salsa and encompasses elements of Blues, Son, Jazz, Mambo and Bossa Nova. The album was written, arranged and produced by Juan Luis Guerra and according to the artist is his most romantic album. It is composed of four merengues, two bachatas, three romantic songs and two salsas.

La Llave de Mi Corazon was met with critical acclaim with praise for its musical structure and mix and variety of tropical elements on the songs. It won six awards at the 8th Annual Latin Grammy Awards including Album of the Year and won a Grammy Award for Best Traditional Tropical Latin Album at the 50th Annual Grammy Awards. Also it won Tropical Album of the Year by Duo or Group at the 2008 Latin Billboard Music Award and six Soberano Awards in 2008. The album was supported by five official singles, including the lead single "La Llave de mi corazón" that tops the US Billboard Hot Latin Songs and Tropical Airplay.

The album was a commercial success across Latin America and Europe. It debuted at No. 77 on US Billboard 200 and at the top of US Billboard Top Latin Albums and Tropical Albums. It reached the Top 10 in Argentina, Chile, Paraguay, Venezuela, Ecuador and Dominican Republic albums charts and was certified gold and platinum in Colombia, Argentina, Venezuela, Chile and Spain. On October 2, it was released as a special edition and later a Brazilian/Portuguese Edition. To promote the album, Guerra embarked on "La Travesia Tour".

== Background ==
On Early 2006, Guerra wrapped up his 20th Anniversary Tour ("Tour 20 años) his longest tour since areito. On April 27, 2006, he appeared in Sting`s concert at Altos De Chavon in La Romana, Dominican Republic as a surprise guest. Later that year, he collaborated on a song with Diego Torres called "Abriendo Caminos" and later with the Mexican rock group Mana on the single "Bendita La Luz". The recording sessions of the album took place between mid 2006 and early 2007 in three different studios: Chocolab Midi Estudio, his own studio (JLG Studios) in Santo Domingo, Dominican Republic and Circle House Studios in Miami, Florida.

On January 22, 2007, the lead single "La Llave de mi corazon" was released along with the music video starring the actress Zoe Zaldaña. The song was an immediate success and top the airplay charts in some countries. According to Guerra, he spent three months recording the track and explained "My main objective was to do something that sounded completely different from everything else you hear." Along with the release of the lead single, "Medicine for my soul" was sent to the airways as a promo single. In a press conference, Guerra revealed that the album contains four merengues, two bachatas, three romantic songs and two salsas.

In February 2007, Guerra revealed that the album contained 13 tracks, including two songs in English and his intentions to record songs in Italian and Portuguese. Guerra later explained that he decided to record in other languages in order to crossover to other markets outside Latin America and the album was supposed to be an artistic renovation on his musical career because it contains music elements of mambo, el funk y el rock mixed with tropical rhythms such as merengue, bachata and salsa. Also, he stated that it was his most romantic album. Later in that month, Guerra was honored with the Lifetime Achievement Award at the 2007 Lo Nuestro Awards and performed at the ceremony.

By 2007, Juan Luis Guerra had sold over 7 millions albums worldwide. The released of the album by EMI Music marked the second time, since his previous album Para Ti`s one off deal with Venemusic, that Guerra signed a distribution deal with a big label. The artist previous albums since 1985's Mundanza y Acarreo were released by the indie label, Karem Records.

== Musical style, writing and composition ==
The album standard version consists of twelve tracks. The opening track "Medicine for my Soul" is Guerra`s first English track since July 19 from his 1994 recording Fogarate Album. "La Travesia" is a merengue song that contains lyrics about how can not find a love like his lover in any part of the world. "Te Contaran" is a salsa song and "Que Me Des Tu Cariño" is a bachata. "Como Yo" is a romantic Merengue and "Si Tu No Bailas Conmigo" is slow merengue about talks about how he wouldn`t dance with nobody but her lover. "Solo Tengo Ojos Para Ti" is an acoustic song about that how he only have eyes to her lover making references on how he can`t no other women in a romantic way.

"Amores" is a merengue with elements of Afropop and "Cancioncita de Amor" is a Salsa song. "Sabia Manera" is a son song. "La llave de mi corazon" is a track with elements of tropical music mixed with merengue, mambo, funk, hip hop, blues and rock and is about a woman who met in a website and how she had the key of heart because he fell in love. "Something is Good" featuring Chiara Civello is a accosting song with elements Bossa Nova about how he had the feeling of positive vibes on his life.

== Critical reception ==
Professional ratings
Review scores
| Source | Rating |
|---|---|
| Allmusic | link |
| Billboard | (Positive) |

The album was praised by the critics due the musical structure and fusion of styles. Evan C. Gutierrez from Allmusic gave La llave de mi corazón 4.5 out of 5 stars and referred to the record as "an intoxicating mix of merengue, bachata and salsa so expertly written and performed as to become an old favorite after the very first listen". Billboard Staff gave a positive Review to the album and wrote "what makes this album worthwhile is his ability to make tropical music transcend at a time when the vast majority of the output in the genre is, frankly, boring". Ed Morales of Newsday placed the album at number one on his list of the top 10 Latin CDs of 2007.

=== Accolades ===
Following the success of the album, Guerra receive multiple awards and honors. Llave de mi corazon won six awards at the 8th Annual Latin Grammy Awards including the big three categories: Record of the Year, Album of the Year and Song of the Year. Also it won Best Engineered Album, Best Merengue Album and Best Tropical Song. The artist was also honored with Person of the Year award. The Album won a grammy for Best Traditional Tropical Latin Album at the 50th Annual Grammy Awards, becoming Guerra`s second win in the category.

Juan Luis Guerra was the most awarded artist at the 2008 Latin Billboard Music Awards winning three awards: Tropical album of the year, duo or group, Hot Latin Songs artist of the year and Produced of the Year. At the 2008 Lo Nuestro Awards, he receive five nominations and won Best Male Tropical Artist. At the 24th Annual Soberano Awards, previously named Casandra Awards, in his native Dominican Republic, won a total of six awards including Album of the year for La llave de mi corazón and the Soberano, the most important award of the ceremony and the highest honored that a Dominican artist can achieve.

== Commercial reception ==
The album was a commercial success across Latin America and Europe and sold more than half a million worldwide. In the United States, La llave de mi corazón debuted at number one on the Billboard Top Latin Albums and Billboard Tropical Albums on the week of April 7, 2007. Also, It debut at 77 on US Billboard 200. Following the broadcast of the ceremony of the Latin Grammy`s 2007, which Guerra performed and won six awards, album sales increased by 143% and jump from 44 to 17 on Top Latin Albums the following week. It was the 5th Best Selling Digital Latin Album of 2007 with 5,500 copies sold. The album sold 80,000 units in the first two months of being released and as of June 2010, it had sold 167,000 copies in the United States.

In Argentina, the album peaked at number 3 on the album charts and was certified platinum for selling over 200,000 copies. In Chile, the album peaked at number 2 at the retail album charts according to La Feria del Disco and was certified Gold. In Spain, the album sold close to 100,000 units as of April, 2010. In Colombia, it sold 17,000 copies in just 3 days of being released and eventually was certified 4 times platinum. In Dominican Republic, La llave de mi corazon was the best selling album of that year and Guerra was named best selling artist of 2007 according to the number as of September of that year. Also, the album peaked at number 8 in Ecuador, 3 in Paraguay and 4 in Venezuela retail albums charts. The album also charted moderately in other territories, peaking at number 12 in Spain, 63 in Mexico and 77 in Netherlands album charts.

== Credits and personnel ==
The following credits are from AllMusic and from the La llave de mi corazon liner notes

=== Performance credits ===
- Juan Luis Guerra — Guitar, Coros
- Ed Calle — Baritone Saxophone, Tenor Saxophone
- Prodigio — Accordion
- Janina Rosado — Piano, Keyboards, Melodica, Bandoneon, Coros
- Adalgisa Pantaleon — Coros
- Roger Zayas — Coros
- Jose Flete — Trombone
- Sandy Gabriel — Tenor Saxophone
- Rafael "Rafo" German — Guira
- Luis del Rosario — Alto Saxophone, Tenor Saxophone
- Luisa Payan — Steel Guitar
- Rodheb Santos — Trumpet
- Ramses Colón — Acoustic Bass
- Chiara Civello — Guest Appearance
- Jeremías King — Bajo Sexto
- Abednego De Los Santos — Bajo Sexto
- Juan "Chocolate" De La Cruz — Bongos, Congas, Maracas, Timbales, Tamboura, Guiro
- Ezequiel Francisco — Drums

=== Technical credits ===
- Juan Luis Guerra — Arranger, Producer
- Recording/Mix Engineers-Ronnie Torres-Luis Mansilla-Allan Leschhorn
- Adam Ayan — Mastering

== Track listing ==
All tracks are written by Juan Luis Guerra.

| No. | Title | Length |
|---|---|---|
| 1. | "Medicine for My Soul" | 3:16 |
| 2. | "La Travesía" | 3:25 |
| 3. | "Te Contarán" | 4:05 |
| 4. | "Que Me Des Tu Cariño" | 3:28 |
| 5. | "Como Yo" | 3:25 |
| 6. | "Si Tú No Bailas Conmigo" | 2:42 |
| 7. | "Sólo Tengo Ojos Para Tí" | 3:20 |
| 8. | "Amores" | 3:25 |
| 9. | "Cancioncita de Amor" | 3:48 |
| 10. | "Sabia Manera" | 3:56 |
| 11. | "La Llave de Mi Corazón" | 3:15 |
| 12. | "Something Good" (featuring Chiara Civello) |
| Total length: | | 44:53 |

Bonus tracks
| No. | Title | Length |
|---|---|---|
| 13. | "A La Vera" | 2:50 |
| Total length: | | 47:43 |

Special Edition
| No. | Title | Length |
|---|---|---|
| 14. | "Medicine for My Soul" (featuring Taboo) | 3:16 |
| 15. | "La Llave De Mi Corazón" (Portuguese version) | 3:16 |
| Total length: | | 54:15 |

Brazilian Edition
| No. | Title | Length |
|---|---|---|
| 16. | "Que Me Dê O Seu Carinho" (featuring Tânia Mara) | 3:34 |
| 17. | "A Travessia" (featuring Daniela Mercury) | 3:27 |
| Total length: | | 61:16 |

== Chart performance ==
| Chart (2007) | Peak position |
|---|---|
| Argentina Albums Chart | 3 |
| Chile Album Chart | 2 |
| Dominican Republic Albums Chart | 1 |
| Dutch Albums Chart | 77 |
| Ecuadorian Albums Chart | 8 |
| Mexico AMPROFON Albums Chart | 63 |
| Spain PROMUSICAE Albums Chart | 12 |
| Peruan Albums Chart | 3 |
| U.S. Billboard 200 | 77 |
| U.S. Billboard Top Latin Albums | 1 |
| U.S. Billboard Tropical Albums | 1 |
| Venezuelan Albums (Recordland) | 4 |

== Sales and certifications ==
| Region | Certification | Certified units/sales |
|---|---|---|
| Argentina (CAPIF) | Platinum | 200,000 |
| Chile | Gold | |
| Colombia | 4× Platinum | |
| Dominican Republic | — | 10,000 |
| Spain (Promusicae) | Gold | 100,000 |
| United States | — | 167,000 |
| Venezuela | Platinum | |

== See also ==
- List of number-one Billboard Top Latin Albums of 2007
- List of number-one Billboard Tropical Albums from the 2000s
