= Todo Tiene Su Hora Tour =

2015–17 concert tour by Juan Luis Guerra

- Tour by Juan Luis Guerra
- Associated album: Todo Tiene Su Hora
- Start date: July 11, 2015
- End date: November 5, 2017
- Legs: 7
- No. of shows: 10 in North America; 5 in Central America; 14 in Europe; 29 in total

Juan Luis Guerra concert chronology
- A Son de Guerra World Tour (2011–13); Todo Tiene Su Hora Tour (2015–17); Literal Tour Grandes Éxitos (2019)

Todo Tiene Su Hora Tour was a world tour by Dominican singer Juan Luis Guerra, in support of the studio album Todo Tiene Su Hora.

== Tour dates ==
Date	City	Country	Venue
Europe
July 11, 2015	Bree	Belgium	Afro-Latino Festival
July 12, 2015	Paris	France	Zénith de Paris
July 14, 2015	London	United Kingdom	02 Academy Brixton
July 17, 2015	Madrid	Spain	WiZink Center
July 19, 2015	Barcelona	Spain	Palau Sant Jordi
July 23, 2015	Las Palmas de Gran Canaria	Spain	Estadio De Gran Canaria
July 25, 2015	Santa Cruz de Tenerife	Spain	Parking del Parque Marítimo
July 26, 2015	Santa Cruz de la Palma	Spain	Pier Santa Cruz De La Palma
July 30, 2015	Murcia	Spain	Murcia Plaza de Toros la Condomina
North America
September 12, 2015	Miami	United States	American Airlines Arena
September 13, 2015	Orlando	United States	Amway Center
September 18, 2015	New York	United States	The Teather At Madison Square Garden
Central America
October 17, 2015	San Juan	Puerto Rico	Coliseo Jose Miguel Agrelot
October 22, 2015	Panama	Panama	Figali Convention Center
October 31, 2015	San Jose	Costa Rica	Parque Viva
December 30, 2015	La Romana	Dominican Republic	Altos de Chavon
North America
February 4, 2016	New York	United States	The Teather At Madison Square Garden
February 6, 2016	Boston	United States	Wang Theatre
February 12, 2016	Montreal	Canada	L’OLIMPIA
February 14, 2016	Bramption	Canada	Powerade Center
February 20, 2016	San Juan	Puerto Rico	Coliseo Jose Miguel Agrelot
September 16, 2016	Hollywood	United States	Hard Rock Live
September 18, 2016	Los Angeles	United States	Greek Theatre
Europe
July 12, 2017	Sevilla	Spain	Palacio de Exposiciones y Congresos de Sevilla
July 15, 2017	Tenerife	Spain	Golf Costa Adeje
July 17, 2017	Marbella	Spain	Starlite
July 20, 2017	A Coruña	Spain	Coliseum da Coruña
July 22, 2017 (Note: This concert was part of Hola Latino Latin Music Festival 2017)	London	United Kingdown	O2 Arena
North America
September 14, 2017	New York	United States	United Palace
September 16, 2017	New York	United States	United Palace
Festival Presidente 2017
November 5, 2017	Santo Domingo	Dominican Republic	Estadio Olimpico Felix Sanchez

=== Box office data ===
City	Country	Attendance	Box office
San Juan	Puerto Rico	13,688 / 14,216 (96%)	$1,235,128
Miami	United States	12,226 / 12,226 (100%)	$1,334,866
New York	United States	5,382 / 5,382 (100%)	$674,389
Totals		16,862 / 16,862 (100%)	$1,552,630
