= Para Ti =

Studio album by Juan Luis Guerra
- Released: August 31, 2004
- Recorded: 2003–2004
- Studio: Hit Factory Criteria (Miami); JLG Estudio "En Kiu" (Santo Domingo, Dominican Republic)
- Genre: Merengue, Christian, salsa
- Length: 42:19
- Label: Vene Music

Juan Luis Guerra chronology
| Colección Romantica (2001) | Para Ti (2004) | La Llave de mi Corazón (2007) |

Singles from Para Ti
- 1. "Para Ti" Released: June 28, 2004; 2. "Las Avispas" Released: November 15, 2004; 3. "Los Dinteles" Released: February 21, 2005

Para Ti (transl. For You) is the ninth studio album by singer-songwriter Juan Luis Guerra and his band 4.40. It was released on August 31, 2004, by Vene Music and distributed by Universal Latin Music. It was his first studio album in six years since Ni es lo mismo ni es igual (1998) and is his first Christian-gospel inspired album. The lyrics are inspired by his conversion to Christianity and his experience of being a born again Christian. The album explores music genres from gospel and ballads to the salsa and merengue. The album was supported by the release of three official singles: "Para Ti", "Las Avispas" and "Dinteles".

Para Ti received positive reviews from both critics and fans and won two awards at the 6th Annual Latin Grammy Awards, Best Christian Album (Spanish Language) and Best Tropical Song for "Las Avispas". It was awarded Tropical Album Of The Year, Male, and Latin Christian/Gospel Album Of The Year at the 2005 Latin Billboard Music Awards. Guerra was awarded the Spirit Of Hope for his philanthropic work in the Dominican Republic. In 2025, Billboard included the album on the Top 30 Best Christian Albums list.

Para Ti was a commercial success in Latin America and was certified gold and platinum in Argentina, Colombia, Venezuela and Central America. In the United States, it debuted at number 2 on Billboard Top Latin Album and was his first album to debut inside the Billboard 200 at number 110. It remained the top-selling album on the US tropical album charts for seven weeks and was certified triple platinum by the RIAA (Latin Field) for 300,000 shipments in the United States. It sold 98,000 copies worldwide within two days of release and sold half a million copies worldwide.To promote the Album, Guerra embarked on Tour 20 años, his first tour since Areito Tour in 1993. The tour visited many countries including the United States, Italy, Denmark, Spain, Holland and closed with a concert in Santo Domingo, Dominican Republic.

== Background ==
Following the release of Guerra's seventh studio album, Fogarate (1994), Guerra decided to retire because of stress and personal issues. In 1996, he converted to Christianity. In 1998, on the track "Testimonio", included on the tracklist of the album Ni es lo mismo ni es igual, Guerra described how his life changed since his conversion. In 2003, he performed at the closing ceremony at the 2003 Pan American Games in Santo Domingo, his first performance in the country since his show in 1999 at Altos de Chavon. In February 2004, it was confirmed by the press that Guerra was going to release an album called Para Ti and it was a Christian-inspired album. On July 15, 2004, Guerra signed a one-off contract with Vene Music to release the album. He remained signed to his long time indie-label Karen Records.

== Reception ==
=== Critical reception ===
Professional ratings
Review scores
| Source | Rating |
|---|---|
| Allmusic | 3.5/5 stars |

Para Ti received positive reviews from critics. Jenny Gage from Allmusic gave the album three and half stars out of five. She said "Para Ti is bound to make all but the most stalwartly areligious feel a whole lot better. Aside from a couple of isolated missteps involving a culturally displaced gospel choir and what sounds suspiciously like a wind machine, these are great songs, as danceable as they are devotional". The album received two awards at the 6th Annual Latin Grammy Awards, for Best Christian Album (Spanish Language) and Best Tropical Song for "Las Avispas". In 2005 Guerra was the most nominated artist for the 2005 Casandra Awards. He was awarded Best International Artist and Merengue of the Year for "Las Avispas". In 2025, The latin section of Billboard included the album of the list titled "Christian Music: The 30 Best Spanish-Language Albums of All Time".

=== Commercial reception ===
In the United States, the album debuted at number 110 at the Billboard 200, Guerra's first album to debut inside the chart, and sold 10,000 copies in the first week. Its debut at number 2 of US Billboard Latin Albums was the highest debut for a Christian album on that chart. Four weeks later, Para Ti remained at the top five, an anomaly for an album whose content - a mix of praise and worship, gospel and inspirational music - is profoundly devotional. It topped the Tropical Albums charts for seven consecutive weeks and was the sixth best-selling tropical album of 2004. It was certified platinum three times (Latin field) by the RIAA for shipping 300,000 copies in the United States. In Latin America, the album reached the Top 10 in Argentina and was certified gold for selling over 20,000 copies. In Dominican Republic, it topped the charts and was the best-selling album of 2004 despite piracy. It was certified platinum in Venezuela and Gold in Central America and Colombia. In Spain, the album peaked at number 41 and sold over 20,000 copies. Worldwide, Para Ti sold more copies than Bachata Rosa in the first week. In total it sold half a million copies worldwide.

== Track listing ==
All tracks are written by Juan Luis Guerra.

| No. | Title | Length |
|---|---|---|
| 1. | "Soldado" | 3:55 |
| 2. | "Eres" | 3:26 |
| 3. | "Los Dinteles" | 3:38 |
| 4. | "Gloria" | 4:50 |
| 5. | "Mi Padre Me Ama" | 4:09 |
| 6. | "Las Avispas" | 3:18 |
| 7. | "Tan Solo He Venido" | 4:10 |
| 8. | "Para Ti" | 3:43 |
| 9. | "Extiende Tu Mano" | 4:13 |
| 10. | "Aleluya" | 2:26 |
| 11. | "Canción de Sanidad" | 4:38 |
| Total length: | | 42:19 |

== Charts ==
| Chart (2004) | Peak position |
|---|---|
| Argentina Albums Chart | 9 |
| Dominican Republic Albums Chart | 1 |
| Spanish Albums (PROMUSICAE) | 41 |
| US Billboard 200 | 110 |
| US Top Latin Albums (Billboard) | 2 |
| US Tropical Albums (Billboard) | 1 |
| US Top Heatseekers (Billboard) | 3 |
| Venezuela Albums Chart | 7 |

== Sales and certifications ==
| Region | Certification | Certified units/sales |
|---|---|---|
| Argentina (CAPIF) | Gold | 20,000^{^} |
| Central America (CFC) | Gold | |
| Colombia | Gold | |
| Dominican Republic | — | 4,192 |
| Spain | — | 20,000 |
| United States (RIAA) | 3× Platinum (Latin) | 300,000^{^} |
| Venezuela | Platinum | |
^{^} Shipments figures based on certification alone.

== See also ==
- List of number-one Billboard Top Latin Albums of 2004
- List of number-one Billboard Tropical Albums from the 2000s
- Captain Avispa (2024), animated film inspired by the song Las Avispas
