= Loma de Cayenas =

Single by Vicente Garcia with Juan Luis Guerra

from the album Candela
- Released: October 26, 2018
- Genre: Merengue
- Length: 3:45
- Label: Sony Music Latin
- Songwriters: Vicente García, Ricardo Muñoz Repko

Vicente García singles chronology
"Dulcito e Coco" (2017)	"Loma de Cayenas" (2018)

Juan Luis Guerra singles chronology
"Carmín" (2018)	"Loma de Cayenas" (2018)	"Kitipun" (2019)

"Loma de Cayenas" (Cayenas Hill) is a song by the Dominican singer-songwriter duo of Vicente García and Juan Luis Guerra. It was released on October 26, 2018 by Sony Music Latin. It was the lead single of García's third studio album, Candela.

== Charts ==
Chart (2019)	Peak position
Colombia (National-Report)	18
Dominican Republic (Monitor Latino)	13
Puerto Rico (Monitor Latino)	12
US Latin Pop Songs (Billboard)	31
US Tropical Airplay (Billboard)	6
Venezuela (National-Report)	56
