= Kitipun =

Single by Juan Luis Guerra

from the album Literal
- Released: April 4, 2019
- Genre: Bachata
- Length: 3:43
- Label: Universal Music Latin Entertainment
- Songwriter(s): Juan Luis Guerra

Juan Luis Guerra singles chronology
"Loma de Cayenas" (2018)	"Kitipun" (2019)	"Corazón Enamorado" (2019)

"Kitipun" is a song by Dominican singer-songwriter Juan Luis Guerra. It was written by Guerra and released by Universal Music Latin on April 4, 2019 as the lead single from his fourteenth studio album, Literal. The song reached number one in Dominican Republic and Puerto Rico, as well as reached the top 10 in El Salvador, Panama and Venezuela, the top 20 in Guatemala and the top 30 in Ecuador. The song won Best Tropical Song at the 20th Latin Grammy Awards.

== Charts ==
Chart (2019)	Peak position
Dominican Republic (Monitor Latino)	1
Ecuador (National-Report)	23
El Salvador (Monitor Latino)	10
Guatemala (Monitor Latino)	11
Panama (Monitor Latino)	10
Puerto Rico (Monitor Latino)	1
US Latin Airplay (Billboard)	26
US Tropical Airplay (Billboard)	4
US Latin Pop Airplay (Billboard)	18
Venezuela (Monitor Latino)	6
Venezuela (National-Report)	4
