= Bachata Rosa World Tour =

1991–92 concert tour by Juan Luis Guerra

- Tour by Juan Luis Guerra
- Associated album: Bachata Rosa
- Start date: July 5, 1991
- End date: July 4, 1992
- Legs: 4
- No. of shows: 55
- Attendance: 350,000

Juan Luis Guerra concert chronology
- Ojalá Que Llueva Café Tour (1990–91); Bachata Rosa World Tour (1991–92); Areito World Tour (1993)

Bachata Rosa World Tour is the first concert world tour by Dominican recording artist Juan Luis Guerra and his Band 4:40 to promote this blockbuster album Bachata Rosa (1990). It started at July 5, 1991, in Puerto Rico and ended on July 4, 1992, in Los Angeles, and was sponsored by soft drink manufacturer Pepsi and the European leg by Bitter Kas. With tour stops throughout the Americas and Europe, it broke several attendance records and drew over 350,000 fans.

== Background ==
In 1989, Guerra released his fourth studio album Ojalá Que Llueva Café. The album met with universal critical acclaim and commercial success on Latin markets. To promote the album, the group made several concerts. In March 1990, Juan Luis Guerra and 4:40 made their first concert in Miami at Calle ocho and in November 1990 Michael Dukakis proclaimed October 21 as "Juan Luis Guerra y 4.40 Groupo Day".

Following the unexpected success of the three singles "Como Abeja Al Panal" "La Bilirrubina" and "Burbujas de Amor", Guerra next album was pushed back to December 1990. In Chile, Juan Luis Guerra performed for the first time in February 1991 at XXXII Viña del Mar International Song Festival. By June 1991, Bachata Rosa topped Billboard Latin charts for 21 weeks. On the same month, Guerra announced his plans to do a World Tour to promote the album including an 11 city stop on United States. Ten more concerts were planned for a second US Leg in Summer 1992 sponsored by U.S. brewer Anheuser- Busch. Guerra did performed the first concerts in Los Angeles, however cancelled the rest of the concerts to focus on recording his next studio album. The last leg of the tour that was scheduled to visit some countries in South America and Brazil, was suspended due to an eye surgery.

== Reception ==
=== Critical reception ===
The tour receive mostly positive reviews. Enrique Blanc from Los Angeles times gave a positive review to the concert at Universal Amphitheater in Los Angeles writing "Guerra's music has opened a new path, where traditional forms of Latin music can be re-explored and taken beyond their prior limits". Jon Pareles from New York Times, attended the concert in New York and wrote a review titled "A Dominican Sound With a Broad Appeal". In other Hand, Ramiro Burr wrote a positive review titled "Guerra's salsa moves feet, hips, hearts" praising Guerra stage presence and production.

=== Commercial reception ===
Following the success of Bachata Rosa, high expectations were around Guerra next tour. Billboard stated that "The first U.S. tour by Juan Luis Guerra & 4.40, the Latin equivalent of Michael Jackson's tour". The leg broke attendance records and the average price ticket was $35, higher than many rock stars at the time. According to Cashbox, the world tour drew over 350,000 fans throughout the Americas and Europe. The concerts in New York on 25–27 November 1991 at the Paramount, drew more than 15,000 and Los Angeles gig on 23–24 November, at the two concerts at the Universal Amphitheatre had an attendance of 10,889. In Miami, the concert at Miami arena was sold out and drew over 12,000 fans. Tickets for the Laredo and Houston concert were between $20 to $50 and $80.

Media reported that the concerts in Spain had total attendance of 250,000 fans on 17 concerts. The concert in Madrid, Spain were sold out with 22,000 tickets sold while thousands of fans were left outside and 20,000 in Barcelona. Also, over 20,000 fans show up at the Estadio Bailados and 15,000 at A Coruña. Following the concert, local authorities decided to lowered the capacity of the venue for concerts to 13,000. Over 30,000 tickets were sold at Gijon. According to Colombian newspaper El Tiempo, Guerra earned over US$75,000 per show during the summer leg of 1991.

El Siglo de Torreón stated that the success of the South America leg were unprecedent. The concert in Quito, Ecuador, broke records in tickets sales with 60,000. Over 10,000 tickets were sold in Alajuela, Costa Rica and 30,000 in Asuncion. In Montevideo, the attedance was 15,000 despite the low temperatures. In Santo Domingo, Dominican Republic, Guerra performed at Estadio Olimpico with a record audience of 80,000 fans on 24 December 1991. However, the concert in Veracruz reported low tickets sales and the concert at Madison Square Garden on August 2, 1992, was cancelled citing low tickets sale because no new music was release. Eventually, all the concerts of the second leg, except of Los Angeles, were cancelled.

== Tour dates ==
Date	City	Country	Venue
July 5, 1991	Bayamon	Puerto Rico	Coliseo Rubén Rodríguez
Europe
July 10, 1991	Zaragoza	Spain	Plaza de los Toros
July 11, 1991	Las Palmas	Spain	Estadio Insular
July 13, 1991	Benidorm	Spain	
July 15, 1991	Valencia	Spain	Plaza de Toros de Valencia
July 17, 1991	Barcelona	Spain	Plaza de Toros
July 18, 1991	Huesca	Spain	Plaza de Toros de Huesca
July 19, 1991	Bilbao	Spain	Plaza de Toros Vista Alegre
July 20, 1991	Santander	Spain	Estadio el Sardinero
July 22, 1991	Madrid	Spain	Plaza de Las Ventas de Madrid
July 23, 1991	Madrid	Spain	Plaza de Las Ventas de Madrid
July 24, 1991	Salamanca	Spain	Plaza de Toros de Salamanca
July 25, 1991	Puerto Real	Spain	
July 27, 1991	Malaga	Spain	Plaza de Toros de Malaga
July 28, 1991	Almeria	Spain	
August 2, 1991	Vigo	Spain	Estadio Bailados de Vigo
August 3, 1991	A Coruña	Spain	Coliseum da Coruña
August 4, 1991	Gijon	Spain	Hipodromo de Mestas
North America
September 7, 1991	Mexico City	Mexico	Auditorio Nacional
September 8, 1991	Mexico City	Mexico	Auditorio Nacional
September 12, 1991	Mexico City	Mexico	Palacio de los Deportes
September 19, 1991	Guadalajara	Mexico	Estadio Tecnológico Universitario
November 15, 1991	Washington D.C	United States	Patriot Center
November 22, 1991	San Francisco	United States	Civic Auditorium
November 23, 1991	Los Angeles	United States	Universal Amphitheatre
November 24, 1991	Los Angeles	United States	Universal Amphitheatre
November 25, 1991	New York City	United States	The Paramount
November 26, 1991	New York City	United States	The Paramount
November 27, 1991	New York City	United States	The Paramount
November 29, 1991	Boston	United States	Matthews Arena
November 30, 1991	Orlando	United States	Orange County Convention and Civic Center
December 1, 1991	Miami	United States	Miami Arena
December 6, 1991	Laredo	United States	Laredo Civic Center
December 7, 1991	Houston	United States	Sam Houston Coliseum
December 8, 1991	Austin	United States	Frank C. Erwin Jr. Special Events Center
December 14, 1991	East Rutherford	United States	Meadowlands Convention Center
December 15, 1991	East Rutherford	United States	Meadowlands Convention Center
Latin America
December 22, 1991	Santo Domingo	Dominican Republic	Juan Pablo Duarte Olympic Stadium
May 13, 1992	Santiago	Chile	Pista Atlética del Estadio Naiconal
May 14, 1992	Santiago	Chile	Pista Atlética del Estadio Naiconal
May 15, 1992	Santiago	Chile	Pista Atlética del Estadio Naiconal
May 18, 1992	Asuncion	Paraguay	Estadio Defensores del Chaco
May 19, 1992	Asuncion	Paraguay	Estadio Defensores del Chaco
May 20, 1992	Asuncion	Paraguay	Estadio Defensores del Chaco
May 22, 1992	Buenos Aires	Argentina	Luna Park
May 23, 1992	Buenos Aires	Argentina	Luna Park
May 24, 1992	Buenos Aires	Argentina	Luna Park
May 25, 1992	Buenos Aires	Argentina	Luna Park
May 29, 1992	Montevideo	Uruguay	Estadio Centenario
June 5, 1992	Lima	Peru	Estadio Alejandro Villanueva
June 9, 1992	Quito	Ecuador	Estadio Olimpico Atahualpa
June 17, 1992	Alajuela	Costa Rica	Estadio Alejandro Morera Soto
June 20, 1992	Managua	Nicaragua	Estadio Nacional
June 21, 1992	Managua	Nicaragua	Estadio Nacional
North America
July 4, 1992	Los Angeles	United States	Universal Amphitheatre

=== Box office data ===
City	Country	Attendance	Box office
New York	United States	15,466 / 17,400 (89%)	$589,402
Los Angeles	United States	10,889 / 12,000 (91%)	$332,664
Buenos Aires	Argentina	32,000 / 32,000 (100%)	$808,080
Total		58,355 / 61,400 (95%)	$1,730,146

== Cancelled concerts ==
List of cancelled concerts, showing date, city, country, venue, and reason for cancellation
Date	City	Country	Venue	Reason
September 3, 1991	Torreón	Mexico	Estadio de la Revolución	Low Tickets Sales and Bad weather
December 8, 1991	El Paso	United States	El Paso Coliseum	Schedule Conflict
July 3, 1992	Los Angeles	United States	Universal Amphitheatre	Schedule Conflict
July 5, 1992	Los Angeles	United States	Universal Amphitheatre	Health Issues
August 2, 1992	New York	United States	Madison Square Garden	Poor Tickets Sales
