= Lámpara Pa' Mis Pies =

"Lampara pa`mis pies"

Single by Juan Luis Guerra

from the album Literal
- Released: August 30, 2019
- Genre: Merengue
- Length: 3:00
- Label: Universal Music Latin
- Songwriter: Juan Luis Guerra

Juan Luis Guerra singles chronology
"I love You More" (2019)	"Lampara pa`mis pies" (2019)

"Lampara Pa`Mis Pies" (A Lamp for My Feet) is a song by Juan Luis Guerra, released on August 30, 2019, as the fourth single from his fourteenth studio album Literal. The music video was recorded in Puerto Plata, Dominican Republic.

== Charts ==
Chart (2019)	Peak position
Dominican Republic (Monitor Latino)	10
Puerto Rico (Monitor Latino)	12
US Tropical Airplay (Billboard)	5
