= A Son de Guerra World Tour =

2011–13 concert tour by Juan Luis Guerra

- Tour by Juan Luis Guerra
- Associated album: A Son de Guerra
- Start date: August 12, 2011
- End date: December 12, 2013
- Legs: 10
- No. of shows: 5 in North America; 21 in Central & South America; 10 in Europe; 1 in Asia; 3 in Australia; 39 in total

Juan Luis Guerra concert chronology
- La Travesia Tour (2008–09); A Son de Guerra World Tour (2011–13); Todo Tiene Su Hora Tour (2015–17)

The A Son de Guerra World Tour was a concert tour by Juan Luis Guerra, mainly to promote his eleventh studio album, A Son de Guerra (2010). The tour began with three shows in Puerto Rico before moving to South and Central America.

== Supporting or co-headlining acts ==
15 September 2011	Vicente García, Gian Marco	Lima	Perú
17 September 2011	Gian Marco	Arequipa	Perú
6 January 2012	Don Omar*	Cartagena	Colombia
7 January 2012	Don Omar*	Manizales	Colombia
7 March 2012	Amelia Vega	Miami	United States

=== Additional notes ===
- (*) Denotes co-headlining act

== Tour dates ==
Date	City	Country	Venue
Central America
August 12, 2011	San Juan	Puerto Rico	Coliseo de Puerto Rico, José Miguel Agrelot
August 13, 2011	San Juan	Puerto Rico	Coliseo de Puerto Rico, José Miguel Agrelot
August 15, 2011	San Juan	Puerto Rico	Coliseo de Puerto Rico, José Miguel Agrelot
August 18, 2011	Bogotá	Colombia	Corferias
August 20, 2011	Cali	Colombia	Centro de Eventos Valle del Pacifico
August 25, 2011	San José	Costa Rica	Estadio Nacional
August 27, 2011	Panama City	Panama	Figali Convention Center
September 3, 2011 ^{[A]}	Willemstad	Curaçao	Curazao North Seas Jazz Festival
South America II
September 9, 2011	Valencia	Venezuela	Forum de Valencia
September 15, 2011	Lima	Peru	Estadio San Marcos
September 17, 2011	Arequipa	Peru	Estadio Monumental Virgen de Chapi
September 23, 2011	Montevideo	Uruguay	Velodromo Municipal de Montevideo
October 7, 2011	Santiago	Chile	Movistar Arena
October 9, 2011	Buenos Aires	Argentina	GEBA
Central America II
October 22, 2011	Tegucigalpa	Honduras	Estadio Chochi Sosa
October 24, 2011	El Salvador	El Salvador	Estadio Jorge "Mágico" González
October 26, 2011	Guatemala City	Guatemala	Estadio del Ejército
North America
November 24, 2011	Guadalajara	Mexico	Auditorio Telmex
2012
South America III
January 6, 2012	Cartagena	Colombia	Estadio Cartagena
January 7, 2012 ^{[B]}	Manizales	Colombia	Estadio Palogrande
February 16, 2012	Caracas	Venezuela	Terraza del C.C.C.T.
March 10, 2012	New York City	United States	Radio City Music Hall
March 17, 2012	Miami	United States	American Airlines Arena
NX
Australia
April 20, 2012	Melbourne	Australia	Melbourne Convention and Exhibition Centre
April 22, 2012	Brisbane	Australia	Brisbane Entertainment Centre
April 24, 2012	Sydney	Australia	Olympic Park Sports Center
Dominican Republic
June 16, 2012	Santo Domingo	Dominican Republic	Félix Sánchez Olympic Stadium
Europe
June 26, 2012	Zurich	Switzerland	Volkshaus
June 30, 2012	Madrid	Spain	Santiago Bernabéu Stadium
July 2, 2012	Munich	Germany	Tonhalle – Kultabrik
July 5, 2012	Las Palmas	Spain	Gran Canaria Stadium
July 6, 2012	Arona	Spain	Estadio Olimpico Antonio Dominguez
2013
Europe & Asia
October 5, 2013	Paris	France	Zenith de Paris
October 8, 2013	Brussels	Belgium	Royal Circus (Cirque Royal/Koninklijk Circus)
October 10, 2013	Hanover	Germany	Star Event Center
October 12, 2013	Rotterdam	Netherlands	Ahoy
October 14, 2013	London	United Kingdown	Royal Albert Hall
October 16, 2013	Tel Avi	Israel	Nokia Arena
Mexico
November 2, 2013	Acapulco	Mexico	Forum de Mundo Imperial
December 12, 2013	Zapopan	Mexico	Auditorio Telmex

- A The September 3, 2011 concert in Willemstad was part of the "Curazao North Seas Jazz Festival 2011".
- B The January 7, 2012 concert in Manizales at the Palogrande Stadium was part of the "Feria de Manizales 2012".

=== Cancellations and rescheduled shows ===
10 September 2011	Caracas	Venezuela	Poliedro de Caracas	Cancelled due to security measures.

=== Box office data ===
City	Country	Attendance	Box office
New York City	United States	5,948 / 5,948 (100%)	$620,830
Miami	United States	10,914 / 10,914 (100%)	$931,800
Totals		16,862 / 16,862 (100%)	$1,552,630

== See also ==
- A Son de Guerra Tour (album)
