= Tus Besos (Juan Luis Guerra song) =

Single by Juan Luis Guerra

from the album Todo Tiene Su Hora
- Released: August 25, 2014
- Genre: Bachata
- Length: 3:17
- Label: Capitol Latin/Universal Music Latin Entertainment
- Songwriter: Juan Luis Guerra

Juan Luis Guerra singles chronology
"Llegaste Tú" (2014)	"Tus Besos" (2014)	"Todo Tiene Su Hora" (2015)

"Tus Besos" ("Your Kisses") is a song by Dominican singer-songwriter Juan Luis Guerra, it was released by Capitol Latin on August 25, 2014. Is the lead single from his twelfth studio album Todo Tiene Su Hora (2014). The music video was nominated for Video of the Year at the Lo Nuestro Awards of 2015.

== Track listing ==
- Digital download
1. "Tus Besos" - 3:17

== Charts ==
Chart (2014)	Peak position
Colombia (National-Report)	11
Dominican Republic (Monitor Latino)	2
Spain (PROMUSICAE)	44
US Hot Latin Songs (Billboard)	8
US Latin Airplay (Billboard)	1
US Tropical Airplay (Billboard)	1
Venezuela (Record Report)	50

=== Year-end charts ===
Chart (2014)	Position
US Latin Songs	39
US Latin Tropical Airplay	17

== See also ==
- List of Billboard number-one Latin songs of 2014
