= Adiemus =

Adiemus may refer to:

- Adiemus (albums), a series of albums of music composed by Karl Jenkins
  - Adiemus: Songs of Sanctuary, the first album of the series
  - "Adiemus" (song), the title track of the first album
- Adiemus (ensemble), the group of Karl Jenkins, Mike Ratledge, and Miriam Stockley formed for Songs of Sanctuary
