= Imagined Oceans =

Studio album by Karl Jenkins
- Released: 1998
- Recorded: CTS 1998
- Genre: Classical
- Length: 67:37
- Label: Sony Classical
- Producer: Karl Jenkins

Karl Jenkins chronology
Adiemus II: Cantata Mundi (1997)	Imagined Oceans (1998)	Adiemus III: Dances of Time (1998)

Released in 1998, Imagined Oceans is an album by Welsh composer Karl Jenkins. This work was inspired by thirteen lunar mare for which the tracks are titled. The musical style is similar to Jenkins's Adiemus compositions and each track explores the meaning of its Latin name through various musical techniques. Unlike most of the Adiemus pieces, the lyrics for Imagined Oceans consist of syllables from the tracks' titles rather than invented text.

== Instrumentation ==
- recorder
- Two percussionists playing:
  - cymbals
  - bongos
  - tambourine
  - timbales
  - güiro
  - triangle
  - mark tree
  - wind chimes
  - sizzle cymbals
  - Chinese cymbals
  - bass drum
  - tam-tam
  - tablas
  - pandeiro
  - crotales
- strings

== Track listing ==
1. "Mare Crisium Introitus" (Sea of Crises) – 2:51
2. "Lacus Serenitatis" (Lake of Serenity) – 4:52
3. "Mare Vaporum" (Sea of Vapours) – 4:27
4. "Mare Australis" (Southern Sea) – 6:41
5. "Lacus Somniorum" (Lake of Dreams) – 2:39
6. "Lacus Pereverantiae" (Lake of Perseverance) – 8:41
7. "Lacus Doloris" (Lake of Sorrow) – 4:55
8. "Mare Undarum" (Sea of Waves) – 4:54
9. "Palus Nebularum" (Marsh of Mists) – 3:09
10. "Sinus Iridium" (Bay of Rainbows) – 2:13
11. "Mare Imbrium" (Sea of Showers) – 4:46
12. "Lacus Temporis" (Lake of Time) – 5:11
13. "Lacus Lenitatis" (Lake of Tenderness) – 3:24
14. "Mare Crisium" (Sea of Crises) – 5:39

== Personnel ==
- Karl Jenkins Ensemble
- Nic Pendlebury – Conductor
- Pamela Thorby – Recorder
- Sarah Eyden – Soprano
- Micaela Haslam – Mezzo-Soprano
- Heather Cairncross – Alto

== Alternate versions ==
Jenkins has used the theme from several tracks in his other works. "Lacus Pereverantiae" shares its theme with "The Dagda" from Adiemus IV: The Eternal Knot. "Palus Nebularum" shares its theme with "Isle of the Mystic Lake" also from The Eternal Knot.
