= Tintinnabulum (disambiguation) =

A tintinnabulum is a bell in a Roman Catholic Basilica.

Tintinnabulum may also refer to:

- Tintinnabulum (Ancient Rome), a wind chime
- Tintinnabuli, a music compositional style devised by the Estonian composer Arvo Pärt
- "Tintinnabulum", a song on the album Adiemus: Songs of Sanctuary by Karl Jenkins
- Dendropsophus tintinnabulum, a species of frog
- "The Bells" (poem), by Edgar Allan Poe, which popularized the word tintinnabulation

== See also ==
- Tinnitus
