= Spring Rain =

Spring Rain may refer to:

- Spring rain

== Art ==
- Spring Rain, a 1911 silk screen painting by Kawai Gyokudō
- Spring Rain, a 1912 painting by John Sloan in Delaware Art Museum
- Spring Rain, a 1963 painting by Vasily Golubev

== Books ==
- Spring Rain, 1942 Bernard Malamud bibliography
- Spring Rain, 1992 first science fiction story of John Meaney

== Japan ==
- Harusame (春雨 Spring-rain) Japanese cellophane noodles
- Harusame (disambiguation) (春雨 Spring-rain)
- Haru no ame (春の雨 Spring Rain) Japanese film by Hiroshi Shimizu (director)

== Music ==
- Spring Rain (album), a 1992 album by Hennie Bekker
- "Spring Rain" (Pat Boone song), 1960
- Spring Rain (Bebu Silvetti song), 1975
- Spring Rain (MAX song), 2002
- Spring Rain (The Go-Betweens song), 1986
- "Spring Rain", a song by Ji-hye from the soundtrack of the TV series Brilliant Legacy
- "Spring Rain", a song by Baek Ji-young from the soundtrack of the TV series Gu Family Book
