= Praise (band) =

English new age band

- Origin: London, England
- Genres: New-age
- Years active: 1991–1992
- Labels: Epic; MPM; WEA; Giant
- Past members: Geoff MacCormack; Simon Goldenberg; Miriam Stockley

Praise were an English new-age music group formed in London in 1991, comprising Geoff MacCormack, Simon Goldenberg and Miriam Stockley.

Praise released one self-titled album in 1992, which was produced, engineered and mixed by Richard James Burgess. It was one of the few ever to be mixed using Qsound which provided virtual surround sound out of a pair of stereo speakers. "Only You", the second track from Praise, was used for an advert for the Fiat Tempra. It was subsequently remixed by producer Pete Lorimer and singer George Michael, and went on to become a hit single, peaking at number four on the UK Singles Chart.

Stockley's vocals for the track were sampled extensively in the dance track of 2000, "Fiji" by Atlantis, which peaked at number 52 in the United Kingdom. Praise disbanded some time after Praise was released, and Stockley went on to perform lead vocals on Karl Jenkins's Adiemus albums.

== Discography ==
=== Albums ===
List of albums, with selected details
Title	Details
Praise	Released: 1992; Label: Giant; Formats: CD, CS

=== Singles ===
List of singles, with selected chart positions, showing year released and album name
Title	Year	Peak chart positions	Album
Title	Year	UK	Album
"Only You"	1991	4	Praise
"Love Without Reason"	1991	—	Non-album single
"Dream On"	1992	—	Praise
"Easy Way Out"	1992	—	Praise
"—" denotes a recording that did not chart or was not released in that territory.
