= Palladio (orchestral piece) =

1995 composition by Karl Jenkins

- by Karl Jenkins
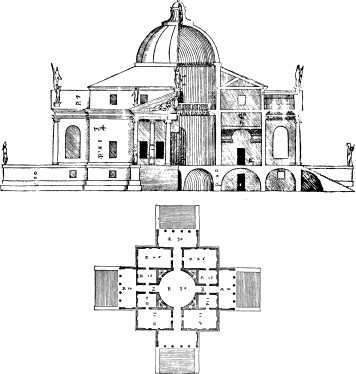
- Plan of La Rotonda by Palladio, whose design in harmonious proportions inspired the composition
- Form: Concerto grosso
- Composed: 1995
- Published: 1996: London by Boosey & Hawkes
- Duration: 16 minutes
- Scoring: string orchestra

Palladio is a composition for string orchestra by Karl Jenkins, completed in 1995, with the title referring to the Venetian Renaissance architect Andrea Palladio (1508–1580). The work in three movements is in the form of a concerto grosso.

== Composition ==
Composed between 1993 and 1995, the piece is a suite of three movements in the form of a concerto grosso for string orchestra, named Palladio, in reference to the Renaissance architect.

Palladio was published in 1996 by Boosey & Hawkes. It takes about 16 minutes to perform. The composer comments:

Palladio was inspired by the sixteenth-century Italian architect Andrea Palladio, whose work embodies the Renaissance celebration of harmony and order. Two of Palladio's hallmarks are mathematical harmony and architectural elements borrowed from classical antiquity, a philosophy which he feels reflects his own approach to composition. The first movement I adapted and used for the 'Shadows: A Diamond is Forever' television commercial for a worldwide campaign. The middle movement I have since rearranged for two female voices and string orchestra, as heard in 'Cantus Insolitus' from my work Songs of Sanctuary.

"Harmonious proportions and mathematics" play a role in music as in architecture. The architect Palladio based his designs on antique Roman models and studied especially the measurements of Vitruvius. Jenkins in turn based his music on Palladio's "harmonious mathematical principles".

The music, especially the first movement, has been arranged for different ensembles, including wind quintet and wind band. Jenkins made a version for piano and used the motifs of movement I for an aria "Exultate jubilate", related to his 70th birthday.

== Scoring and structure ==
The piece in three movements is scored for string orchestra.

1. Allegretto
2. Largo
3. Vivace

== Recording ==
Palladio is featured on a 1996 CD Diamond Music, played by members of the London Philharmonic Orchestra, conducted by the composer. It is combined with other music by Jenkins including variations from Adiemus and his second string quartet. Movement I appears in other collections, such as Karl Jenkins & Adiemus: The Essential Collection.

== Commercial use ==
In 1993, motifs of the first movement, Allegretto, were used for a TV commercial of De Beers entitled "A Diamond Is Forever".

== Escala version ==
The English string quartet Escala recorded a version of Palladio in 2009 which featured on their self-titled debut album, following their appearance on the second series of Britain's Got Talent. It was released as a single and peaked at number 39 on the UK Singles Chart in the week ending 6 June 2009. The single spent one week in the top 40..

This version of the song is played before Fulham F.C. home matches as the players emerge from the tunnel.
