= Richard Harwood =

- Born: 8 August 1979 (age 47); Portsmouth, England
- Genre: Classical
- Occupation: Cellist
- Instrument: Cello
- Years active: 1990–present
- Labels: EMI Classics, Resonus
- Website: richardharwood.com

Richard Harwood is also the assumed name of National Front member Richard Verrall.

Richard Craig Harwood (born 8 August 1979) is a British cellist.

== Biography ==
Richard Harwood was born in Portsmouth, Hampshire and began learning to play the piano aged four and the cello, aged five. He attended Ditcham Park School. He achieved his Associated Board Grade 8 in cello and piano, aged 8 and 11 respectively.

Harwood studied with Joan Dickson from 1988 until her death in 1994, before continuing with Steven Doane and David Waterman (1994–1999), Heinrich Schiff (1999-2003 at the University of Music and Dramatic Art, Vienna) and Ralph Kirshbaum (2003-2005 at the Royal Northern College of Music, Manchester). He also took masterclasses and lessons with Mstislav Rostropovich, János Starker, Steven Isserlis, Boris Pergamenschikow, Miklós Perényi, Bernard Greenhouse, Valentin Erben (Alban Berg Quartet), William Pleeth, Zara Nelsova, and Ferenc Rados.

Harwood made his concerto debut at the age of ten (playing the G minor Kabalevsky Concerto at the Adrian Boult Hall, Birmingham) and, since then, has performed concerti and recitals in major venues including the Royal Albert Hall, Royal Festival Hall, Queen Elizabeth Hall, Wigmore Hall, Musikverein, Concertgebouw, Alte Oper, Thomaskirche, and the Auditorium du Louvre.

As concerto soloist, Harwood has collaborated with conductors such as John Wilson, Okko Kamu, Marko Letonja, Douglas Bostock, En Shao, Shuntaro Sato, David Parry and Yehudi Menuhin, and with orchestras including The Philharmonia, Bournemouth Symphony Orchestra, RTÉ Concert Orchestra, Auckland Philharmonia Orchestra, and the Ural Philharmonic Orchestra.

As chamber musician, he has collaborated with the Jerusalem and Endellion Quartets, Gidon Kremer, Yuri Bashmet, Olivier Charlier, Alena Baeva, Ilya Gringolts, Pekka Kuusisto, Vilde Frang, Chen Halevi, Julian Bliss, Martin Roscoe, Finghin Collins, Ashley Wass and Julius Drake, among others. In 2014, Harwood became the cellist of the Sitkovetsky Trio.

Harwood has performed on BBC radio, having made his BBC Radio 3 debut at the age of thirteen with a live recording of the Elgar Concerto. He has also given performances for Radio France, MDR, RTÉ, and Radio New Zealand.

Harwood's discography includes a critically acclaimed debut disc for EMI Classics, recorded with pianist Christoph Berner, and Composing Without The Picture, a 2013 solo album of concert works written by film composers, on Resonus. Harwood appears in Phil Grabsky's 2009 documentary In Search of Beethoven which received its theatrical premiere at the Barbican Theatre, London, was broadcast on Sky Arts, and shown in cinemas worldwide.

In 2002, Harwood took part in the Park Lane Group Young Artists' Series on the South Bank and premiered solo works written for him by Dominic Muldowney and Martin Butler. He has also worked with Philip Grange, giving the London premiere of his Nocturnal Image, and given the European premiere of David Horne's Zip with the composer at the piano. For his solo album Composing Without the Picture, Harwood premiered works written for him by Christopher Gunning, Alex Heffes, Fernando Velázquez, and Benjamin Wallfisch.

Harwood has won numerous awards including the 2004 Pierre Fournier Award for 'cellists. In 1992, he became the youngest winner of the Audi Junior Musician Award. He won the Worshipful Company of Musicians Maisie Lewis Young Artists Award in 2001 and, in 2004, became the first British 'cellist ever to be awarded the title "Bachpreisträger" at the International Johann Sebastian Bach Competition, Leipzig. Among many other accolades, he received the special "mention" prize from the jury at the Concours de violoncelle Rostropovitch, Paris in 2005.

In 1997, BBC Music Magazine selected him in their worldwide "Who's Who" edition and, in 2000, Harwood was entered into the "International Who's Who in Music" as an 'up and coming talent on the brink of worldwide recognition.'

Harwood plays a cello by Francesco Rugeri, dated 1692.

== Discography ==
- Composing Without the Picture: Concert Works by Film Composers (Resonus, 2013)
- Richard Harwood: Beethoven, Chopin sonatas etc. (EMI Classics, 2007)
- Preisträgerkonzert - XIV. Internationaler Johann Sebastian Bach Wettbewerb 2004 (MDR / Bach-Archiv Leipzig, 2004)
- Adiemus V - 'Vocalise' - Karl Jenkins (EMI, 2003)
