= Adiemus (song) =

1995 single by Karl Jenkins

Single by Adiemus

from the album Adiemus: Songs of Sanctuary
- Released: 7 November 1995
- Recorded: 1993
- Genre: Worldbeat
- Length: 3:48
- Label: Caroline Distribution
- Songwriter: Karl Jenkins
- Producers: Karl Jenkins; Mike Ratledge

Audio sample
- "Adiemus": file; help

Official audio
- "Adiemus" on YouTube

"Adiemus" is a song written by Welsh composer Karl Jenkins and performed by Miriam Stockley with Mary Carewe. It was recorded by the Adiemus project and officially released on the 1995 Adiemus: Songs of Sanctuary album. Jenkins used the music for a setting of psalm verses, "Cantate Domino".

== Recording ==
"Adiemus" was written in 1994 by Karl Jenkins and premiered in a 1994 Delta Air Lines television advertisement. The song was also used in some Delta in-flight videos. Jenkins chose singer Miriam Stockley as a lead vocalist due to her wide range and Purley resident Mary Carewe for additional vocals. The London Philharmonic Orchestra also performed.

The main idea was to create a modern song using classical forms, such as rondo and ternary. The lyrics themselves have no meaning. The vocals are simply used as another instrument to make music and not to convey any message. The song, written in D dorian, is a mix of African-tribal and Celtic-style melodies.

The song was also used as a soundtrack within the Italian TV programme Ciao Darwin and as the opening titles music on the Biblical series Testament: The Bible in Animation.

== Credits and personnel ==
- Karl Jenkins – composer, lyrics, conductor, producer
- Miriam Stockley – lead vocals
- Mary Carewe – additional vocals
- Mike Ratledge – arranger (programmed percussion), producer
- Mick Taylor – flute
- London Philharmonic Orchestra – violins, violas, cellos, double basses, percussion

== Charts ==
Chart (1995)	Peak position
Austria (Ö3 Austria Top 40)	7
Germany (Media Control Charts)	6
Netherlands (Dutch Top 40)	18
Switzerland (Schweizer Hitparade)	4
United Kingdom (UK Singles Charts)	48

== "Cantate Domino" ==
Jenkins used the music for a setting of psalm verses, "Cantate Domino", based on various Psalms, for five-part choir a cappella and drums. It was published by Boosey & Hawkes and recorded as part of the album Motets.
