= The Celts (2000 TV series) =

2000 Welsh television documentary series

- Genre: Documentary series
- Narrated by: John Morgan
- Opening theme: "The Eternal Knot"
- Ending theme: "The Eternal Knot"
- Composer: Karl Jenkins
- Countries of origin: Wales, United Kingdom
- Original language: English
- No. of series: 1
- No. of episodes: 6

Production
- Executive producers: Cenwyn Edwards; John Alick Macpherson
- Producers: Caryl Ebenezer; J. Mervyn Williams
- Editor: Glyn Shakeshaft
- Camera setup: Haydn Denman
- Running time: 50 minutes (per episode)
- Production companies: Opus Television; S4C Rhyngwladol International

Original release
- Network: S4C
- Release: 2000

The Celts (Welsh: Y Celtiaid) is a 2000 television documentary series produced by Opus Television for the Welsh channel S4C. A book adaptation of the same name by John Davies was published in the same year by Cassell & Co. Also in that year, the programme was sold to the American cable network Celtic Vision.

== Synopsis ==
The series examines who the Celts were, where they came from and what made their culture distinctive from other European peoples; with dramatizations of major historical events and visits to modern Celtic lands. A number of archaeologists and scholars of Celtic studies are featured in the documentary, such as Jörg Biel, Peter Connolly, Barry Cunliffe, Markus Egg, Michel Egloff, John T. Koch, Barry Raftery, Colin Renfrew, Peter Reynolds, Thomas Stöllner, Bryan Sykes, among others.

== Episodes ==
1. "In the Beginning": Tracing the origin of the Celts.
2. "Heroes in Defeat": Examining La Tène era, heyday of the Celtic culture.
3. "The Sacred Groves": Looking at ancient Celtic religion, especially Druidism.
4. "From Camelot to Christ": This episode claims that, after the collapse of the Roman Empire, Vortigern, King of the Britons, invited the Anglo-Saxons into Britain to help fight the Picts. Christianity was established during the Anglo-Saxon era.
5. "Legend and Reality": From the 8th century onwards Celtic lands were invaded by the Vikings and then the Normans. Following the 16th-century Protestant Reformation, Celtic communities in Wales, Ireland and Brittany were marginalized in the push for political and religious unity.
6. "A Dead Song?": Examining the meaning and threats to the Celtic identity. The struggle to define an identity still continues today.

== DVD ==
The series has been released on DVD by Kultur International Films in 2010.

== See also ==
- Celtic art
- Celtic Christianity
- Celtic languages
- Celtic mythology
- The Celts: First Masters of Europe
