= Classic FM Hall of Fame =

List of popular works of classical music

The Classic FM Hall of Fame is an annual compilation of the 300 most popular classical works, voted for by listeners of the UK radio station Classic FM. With around 90,000 voters, each choosing their three favourites in order of preference, Classic FM claim their Hall of Fame is the world's most comprehensive poll of classical music tastes.

The countdown, first broadcast in 1996, airs over the four-day Easter holiday weekend.

The compilation is notable for featuring a wide variety of classical works. Pieces by composers such as Elgar and Beethoven feature alongside works by contemporary composers such as Karl Jenkins and Ludovico Einaudi. Film soundtracks by John Williams, John Barry and Ennio Morricone are also regular features of the chart. For the first time in 2012, the chart featured two original works from video game soundtracks.

In 2015, 12 pieces of music from video game soundtracks were voted into Classic FM's top 300 chart. In 2026, Welsh composer Karl Jenkins became the first living composer to top the poll with The Armed Man. It was also the first time that a choral work had reached the top spot. The 2026 poll also had a "record" number of film music entries with 40 in total, and the highest number of entries from living composers.

== Top twenty ==
The current top twenty was revealed on 6 April 2026:

1. Karl Jenkins – The Armed Man
2. Sergei Rachmaninoff – Piano Concerto No. 2
3. Ralph Vaughan Williams – The Lark Ascending
4. Ralph Vaughan Williams – Fantasia on a Theme by Thomas Tallis
5. Edward Elgar – Enigma Variations
6. Gregorio Allegri – Miserere
7. Ludwig van Beethoven – Piano Concerto No. 5 ('Emperor')
8. Howard Shore – The Lord of the Rings
9. Dmitri Shostakovich – Piano Concerto No. 2
10. Ludwig van Beethoven – Symphony No. 9 ('Choral')
11. Gustav Holst – The Planets
12. Ludwig van Beethoven – Symphony No. 6 ('Pastoral')
13. John Williams – Schindler's List
14. Wolfgang Amadeus Mozart – Requiem
15. Jay Ungar – Ashokan Farewell
16. Ennio Morricone – The Mission
17. Wolfgang Amadeus Mozart – Clarinet Concerto
18. Samuel Barber – Adagio for Strings
19. Christopher Tin – The Lost Birds
20. Max Richter – On the Nature of Daylight

== Previous top three ==
| Year | 1 | 2 | 3 |
|---|---|---|---|
| 1996 | Max Bruch – Violin Concerto No. 1 | Sergei Rachmaninoff – Piano Concerto No. 2 | Ludwig van Beethoven – Pastoral Symphony |
| 1997 | Max Bruch – Violin Concerto No. 1 | Sergei Rachmaninoff – Piano Concerto No. 2 | Ludwig van Beethoven – Pastoral Symphony |
| 1998 | Max Bruch – Violin Concerto No. 1 | Sergei Rachmaninoff – Piano Concerto No. 2 | Wolfgang Amadeus Mozart – Clarinet Concerto |
| 1999 | Max Bruch – Violin Concerto No. 1 | Sergei Rachmaninoff – Piano Concerto No. 2 | Wolfgang Amadeus Mozart – Clarinet Concerto |
| 2000 | Max Bruch – Violin Concerto No. 1 | Sergei Rachmaninoff – Piano Concerto No. 2 | Wolfgang Amadeus Mozart – Clarinet Concerto |
| 2001 | Sergei Rachmaninoff – Piano Concerto No. 2 | Max Bruch – Violin Concerto No. 1 | Wolfgang Amadeus Mozart – Clarinet Concerto |
| 2002 | Sergei Rachmaninoff – Piano Concerto No. 2 | Max Bruch – Violin Concerto No. 1 | Ralph Vaughan Williams – The Lark Ascending |
| 2003 | Sergei Rachmaninoff – Piano Concerto No. 2 | Wolfgang Amadeus Mozart – Clarinet Concerto | Max Bruch – Violin Concerto No. 1 |
| 2004 | Sergei Rachmaninoff – Piano Concerto No. 2 | Wolfgang Amadeus Mozart – Clarinet Concerto | Max Bruch – Violin Concerto No. 1 |
| 2005 | Sergei Rachmaninoff – Piano Concerto No. 2 | Ralph Vaughan Williams – The Lark Ascending | Wolfgang Amadeus Mozart – Clarinet Concerto |
| 2006 | Wolfgang Amadeus Mozart – Clarinet Concerto | Sergei Rachmaninoff – Piano Concerto No. 2 | Ralph Vaughan Williams – The Lark Ascending |
| 2007 | Ralph Vaughan Williams – The Lark Ascending | Edward Elgar – Cello Concerto | Sergei Rachmaninoff – Piano Concerto No. 2 |
| 2008 | Ralph Vaughan Williams – The Lark Ascending | Sergei Rachmaninoff – Piano Concerto No. 2 | Ralph Vaughan Williams – Fantasia on a Theme by Thomas Tallis |
| 2009 | Ralph Vaughan Williams – The Lark Ascending | Sergei Rachmaninoff – Piano Concerto No. 2 | Ralph Vaughan Williams – Fantasia on a Theme by Thomas Tallis |
| 2010 | Ralph Vaughan Williams – The Lark Ascending | Sergei Rachmaninoff – Piano Concerto No. 2 | Ralph Vaughan Williams – Fantasia on a Theme by Thomas Tallis |
| 2011 | Sergei Rachmaninoff – Piano Concerto No. 2 | Ralph Vaughan Williams – The Lark Ascending | Ralph Vaughan Williams – Fantasia on a Theme by Thomas Tallis |
| 2012 | Sergei Rachmaninoff – Piano Concerto No. 2 | Ralph Vaughan Williams – The Lark Ascending | Ralph Vaughan Williams – Fantasia on a Theme by Thomas Tallis |
| 2013 | Sergei Rachmaninoff – Piano Concerto No. 2 | Ralph Vaughan Williams – The Lark Ascending | Nobuo Uematsu – Final Fantasy series |
| 2014 | Ralph Vaughan Williams – The Lark Ascending | Sergei Rachmaninoff – Piano Concerto No. 2 | Ralph Vaughan Williams – Fantasia on a Theme by Thomas Tallis |
| 2015 | Ralph Vaughan Williams – The Lark Ascending | Sergei Rachmaninoff – Piano Concerto No. 2 | Ralph Vaughan Williams – Fantasia on a Theme by Thomas Tallis |
| 2016 | Ralph Vaughan Williams – The Lark Ascending | Sergei Rachmaninoff – Piano Concerto No. 2 | Ralph Vaughan Williams – Fantasia on a Theme by Thomas Tallis |
| 2017 | Ralph Vaughan Williams – The Lark Ascending | Sergei Rachmaninoff – Piano Concerto No. 2 | Ralph Vaughan Williams – Fantasia on a Theme by Thomas Tallis |
| 2018 | Pyotr Ilyich Tchaikovsky – 1812 Overture | Sergei Rachmaninoff – Piano Concerto No. 2 | Ralph Vaughan Williams – The Lark Ascending |
| 2019 | Ralph Vaughan Williams – The Lark Ascending | Sergei Rachmaninoff – Piano Concerto No. 2 | Edward Elgar – Enigma Variations |
| 2020 | Ralph Vaughan Williams – The Lark Ascending | Ludwig van Beethoven – Symphony No. 9 | Edward Elgar – Enigma Variations |
| 2021 | Ralph Vaughan Williams – The Lark Ascending | Sergei Rachmaninoff – Piano Concerto No. 2 | Ralph Vaughan Williams – Fantasia on a Theme by Thomas Tallis |
| 2022 | Ralph Vaughan Williams – The Lark Ascending | Sergei Rachmaninoff – Piano Concerto No. 2 | Ralph Vaughan Williams – Fantasia on a Theme by Thomas Tallis |
| 2023 | Sergei Rachmaninoff – Piano Concerto No. 2 | Ralph Vaughan Williams – The Lark Ascending | Ralph Vaughan Williams – Fantasia on a Theme by Thomas Tallis |
| 2024 | Sergei Rachmaninoff – Piano Concerto No. 2 | Ralph Vaughan Williams – The Lark Ascending | Ralph Vaughan Williams – Fantasia on a Theme by Thomas Tallis |
| 2025 | Sergei Rachmaninoff – Piano Concerto No. 2 | Karl Jenkins – The Armed Man | Ralph Vaughan Williams – The Lark Ascending |
| 2026 | Karl Jenkins – The Armed Man | Sergei Rachmaninoff – Piano Concerto No. 2 | Ralph Vaughan Williams – The Lark Ascending |

== Criticism and controversy ==
The Hall of Fame reflects voter preferences, rather than public purchases of recordings, so there has been a lack of variation at the top of the chart. The pieces that make up the top ten have changed very little since the chart began. Only six different pieces have ever held the number one position, and only a dozen works have held the top three spots throughout the chart's existence.

2013 provided the most controversial Hall of Fame to date as a result of an organised voting campaign concerning video game soundtracks by UK based games promoter Mark Robins. Several video game soundtracks were voted into the 2013 Hall of Fame, with the highest being Nobuo Uematsu's music for Final Fantasy at number three. This led to more than 200,000 votes being cast, the highest in the chart's history. John Suchet stated that he was "delighted that we've attracted so many votes for our chart" and that what he finds "truly exciting is the continued increase in a younger audience for classical music – I didn't expect to be thanking the video game industry for introducing the genre to a new generation of people, but it's wonderful."
