= Miriam Stockley =

British singer (born 1962)

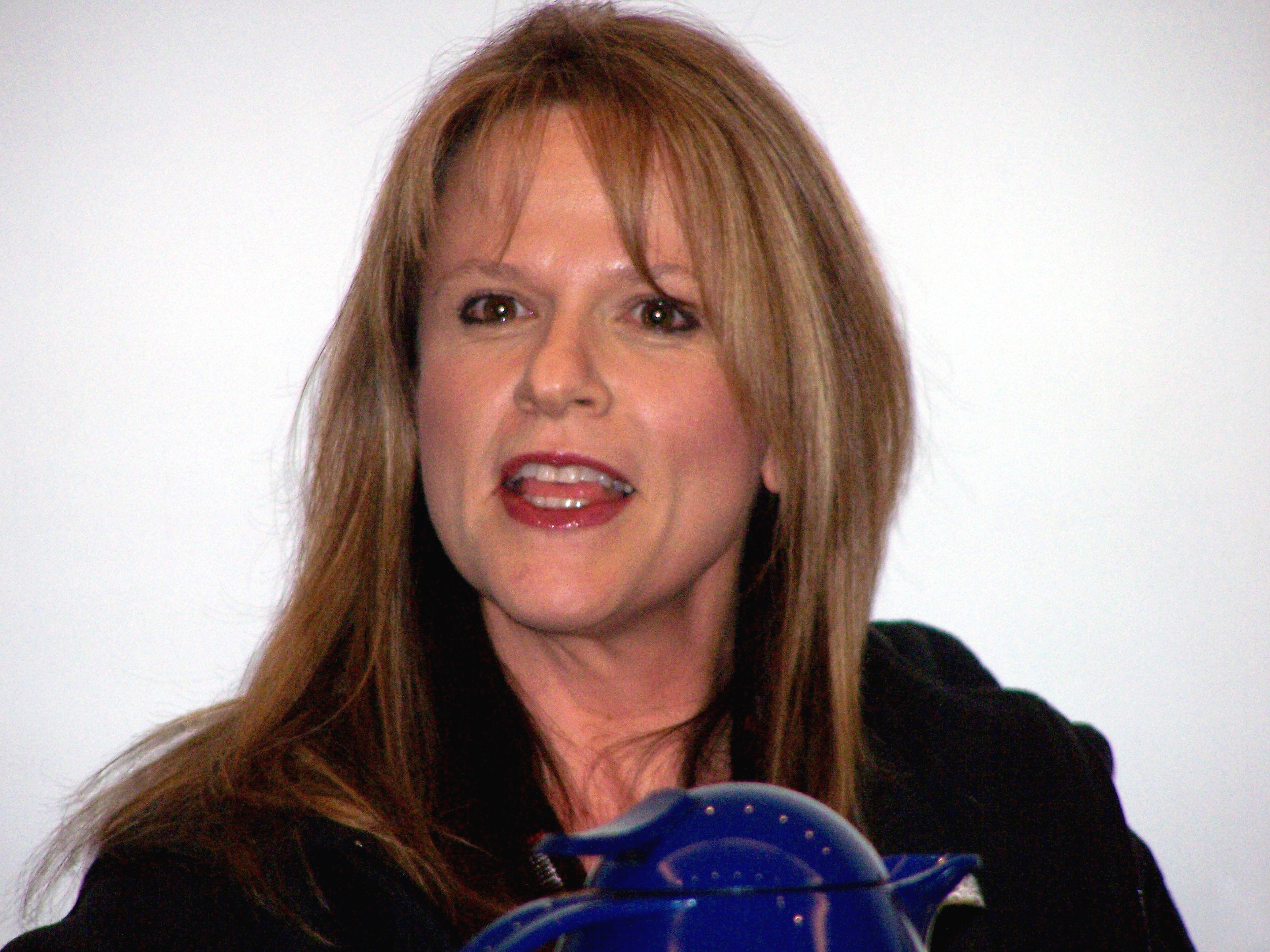
- Stockley in 2006

Background information
- Born: Miriam Arlene Stockley; 15 April 1962 (age 64); Johannesburg, South Africa
- Genres: Classical; world; new age; pop
- Occupations: Singer; composer
- Years active: 1973–present
- Labels: Abbeywood; Sony
- Website: miriamstockley.com

Miriam Arlene Stockley (born 15 April 1962) is a South African singer. She was born in Johannesburg, and her work is influenced by the African music of her home country. Her distinctive vocalise style gained international acclaim when Karl Jenkins launched the Adiemus project with Adiemus: Songs of Sanctuary, with Stockley as the lead singer.

In 1992 she performed as a backing vocalist at the Freddie Mercury Tribute Concert, which was broadcast live from the Old Wembley Stadium in London.

== Early life ==
At the age of eleven, Stockley and her older sister Avryl formed the Stockley Sisters group and had a hit with a cover version of Shocking Blue's "Venus" in 1976 on the South African Top 30, ten years before Bananarama's version. At age 18, she moved to the United Kingdom, settling in London to further pursue her musical career. There she contributed vocals to several albums and TV commercials.

== Career ==
=== 1970s ===
She helped form Odyssey, a short-lived South African disco act consisting of her, Malie Kelly, and guitarist Mike Pilot.

=== 1980–1999 ===
During the late 1980s and early 1990s, Stockley worked as a session singer for the UK songwriting and production trio Stock Aitken Waterman and appeared on tracks by Kylie Minogue, Jason Donovan and Sonia. Alongside fellow session singer Mae McKenna, Stockley is credited with being partly responsible for the distinctive Stock, Aitken and Waterman sound of the 1980s.

Stockley provided backing vocals for the United Kingdom's Eurovision Song Contest entry on several occasions, most notably with Emma in 1990 and for Katrina and the Waves when they won in Dublin in 1997.

In 1991, Stockley became a part of the dance music group Praise whose single "Only You" reached number three in the UK singles chart. A year later, the band, with Stockley on vocals, released its second single, "Dream On". A third single was released entitled: "Easy Way Out". The band was due to start touring, when the entire department of the record label was let go. The band decided to call it a day.

In 1993 she provided backing vocals on the song ”Sensuality” which was sung by the swedish singer Lena Philipsson and released on her album Fantasy (Lena Philipsson album).

In 1995, she worked with Karl Jenkins as the multi-layered vocalist on his first Songs of Sanctuary release, which began as a Delta Air Lines television commercial and was later released on the album Pure Moods.

Stockley's song "Perfect Day," written by Colin Towns and also known as "Theme for the Lake District", was used as the theme song for the BBC children's programme The World of Peter Rabbit and Friends, which ran from 1992 to 1998. She has also appeared as a singer in on episode of Our Friends In The North (1996) and on several BBC Schools programmes, most notably Look and Read and contributed to many film soundtracks, namely, Lord of the Rings, Autumn in New York, Great Expectations, Robroy, Skin, Beloved, and One Night Stand.

=== 2000s ===
Stockley at Night of the Proms in 2006

Stockley is featured as a member of the choir for The Fellowship of the Ring. Her cover version of the Rose Royce song "Wishing on a Star", feature on The 10th Kingdom.

In 2004, Yamaha released Vocaloid software that allows people to synthetically create background vocals. One of the three available voices from the studio Zero-G released for the first edition of the software is based on material recorded by Stockley.

In December 2006, Stockley contributed as a solo vocalist and as a co-vocalist with Mike Oldfield at the German Night of the Proms tour, consisting of 18 concerts. She also released her third solo album, a collection of rearranged classical standards entitled Eternal, in 2006.

In 2006, she joined Richard Gannaway and Jay Oliver as a primary member of the world music group AO Music (also known as AO). She first appeared on the album "Twirl", released 17 February 2009 on the group's indie label Arcturian Gate (debuted on international music charts at No. 5). Twirl contained the song "On Jai Ya"; a piece composed as Olympic theme music (2008) at the request of the Beijing Olympic Committee. Ultimately, the song was not selected and later chosen as soundtrack music for the 2011 promotional trailer "Project Peace on Earth". Twirl was released to an international audience in 2009 with Stockley as the group's main vocalist.

In June 2009, she, Richard Gannaway and Jay Oliver composed and produced the song "Gaiya Lo Mane" as theme music for the Give Kids the World Foundation.

In February 2011 Arcturian Gate released the AO Music's third album ...and Love Rages on!, where Stockley's voice is joined by children's choral ensembles from Beijing, Tbilisi, Johannesburg, Asheville and Orlando (charted at No. 2 internationally and awarded Zone Music Reporter's "Best World Album of 2011"). With the release of the song "...and Love Rages on!", Stockley and AO Music aligned with HavServe under GlobalGiving to build sustainable villages for children in Haiti who were displaced by an earthquake in 2010. On 28 March 2011, she was invited to give a private performance for the Education Without Borders International conference in Dubai.

In March 2013 the AO Music group released Hokulea, which charted at No. 3 internationally and sustained top 20 ranking (Zone Music Reporter) for five consecutive months. With the release of Hokulea AO Music established themselves as 100% non-profit through AO Foundation International, supporting several worldwide organizations that attend to disadvantaged children. Stockley was also credited as the album's co-producer.

== Personal life ==
Stockley is married to musician, producer, and sound engineer Rod Houison, and the couple live in Florida. They have two children.

== Discography ==
=== Solo albums ===
- Miriam Stockley (1979)
- Miriam (1999)
- Second Nature (2003)
- Eternal (2007)
- The World in a Voice (2011)

=== Band/ensemble albums ===
- Adiemus I: Songs of Sanctuary (1995)
- Adiemus II: Cantata Mundi (1996)
- Adiemus III: Dances of Time (1998)
- AO Music – Twirl (2009)
- AO Music – ...and Love Rages On! (2011)
- AO Music – Hokulea (2013)
- AO Music – Asha (2017)
- AO Music – Kutumba (2021)
- AO Music - Otherness (2024)

=== Backing vocals and guest appearances ===
- Billy Fury — The One and Only (1983)
- Hanoi Rocks – Back to Mystery City (1983; backing vocals on "Until I Get You")
- Nik Kershaw – Radio Musicola (1986)
- Roger Daltrey – Can't Wait to See the Movie (1987)
- Freddie Mercury & Montserrat Caballé – Barcelona (1988; backing vocals on "The Golden Boy")
- Elaine Paige – The Queen Album (1988)
- Alphaville – Romeos (1989)
- Cliff Richard – I Just Don't Have the Heart (1989)
- Sonia – Can't Forget You (1989)
- Cliff Richard – Together with Cliff Richard (1991)
- Queen: The Freddie Mercury Tribute Concert (1992)
- Brian May – Back to the Light (1992)
- Eloy – The Tides Return Forever (1994; backing vocals on "Company of Angels")
- Queen – Made in Heaven (1995; backing vocals on Let Me Live)
- Bonnie Tyler – Free Spirit (1995)
- Tina Turner – Wildest Dreams (1996)
- Ronan Keating – When You Say Nothing At All (1999)
- Mike Oldfield – The Millennium Bell (1999)
- Mike Oldfield – The Art in Heaven Concert (2000; backing vocals; lead vocal on "Moonlight Shadow")
- The Fellowship of the Ring soundtrack (2001; choir member)
- Skylanders: Spyro's Adventure (video game, 2011)
- Bonnie Tyler – Between the Earth and the Stars (2019)
- Bonnie Tyler – The Best Is Yet to Come (2021)
- David Helpling – In (2022; lead vocals on "Slipping" and "I Too Am Coming Home")
- Carlos Garo – Nyumba (2026; lead vocals on "Nyumba")
