= Mary Carewe =

English singer

Mary Carewe is an English singer and vocal coach, best known as one of the lead vocalists in Karl Jenkins' musical project Adiemus, often singing harmonies with Miriam Stockley.

She was born in England and trained as a singer in London. Her father, John Carewe, is a conductor, and her sister, Anna Carewe, is a cellist who sometimes appears with Mary as part of the Sheridan Ensemble.

As well as being a solo performer, Carewe has provided backing vocals for other acts, such as Westlife and Steps, and featured on the soundtrack of numerous films, including Emma (1996), Alfie (2004) and Nine (2009). In addition to Adiemus, she sang on Peter Maxwell Davies's Resurrection album and many film compilation albums. Alongside Lance Ellington, she was a soloist at the James Bond 50th Anniversary Gala Concert, broadcast by the BBC television in 2012. She appears regularly in concerts recorded for BBC Radio 2, including over 70 editions of Friday Night is Music Night.
