= The Healer (Jenkins) =

- A Cantata for St Luke
- by Karl Jenkins
- Genre: Cantata
- Text: Collect from the Feast of St Luke from the Book of Common Prayer; The Shepherd (William Blake); Texts by Terry Waite, Vivien Harrison and Carol Barratt; Nunc Dimittis (Luke 2:29-32)
- Language: English; Latin
- Composed: 2014
- Performed: 16 October 2014: Grayshott
- Published: by Boosey & Hawkes
- Scoring: Soprano solo; Baritone solo; Mixed choir; String orchestra; Oboe; Percussion

The Healer, a Cantata for St Luke was written by Karl Jenkins in 2014. Much of the text was written by Terry Waite, Vivien Harrison and Carol Barratt; the remainder is taken from St Luke's Gospel, the Book of Common Prayer and The Shepherd by William Blake.

The cantata's UK premiere was on 16 October 2014 in St Luke's Church, Grayshott, Hampshire, and was recorded and broadcast on Classic FM.

== Movements ==
Movement	Text
Prelude	Book of Common Prayer
Who is this man? This traveller?	Carol Barratt
Ego sum terra	Vivien Harrison
The eyes of a child	Carol Barratt
Salus ... salus ... salus	Terry Waite
The Shepherd	Luke 15:4-7; William Blake
And suddenly	Carol Barratt
Sozo	Carol Barratt
Epilogue: Nunc Dimittis	Luke 2:29-32
