= Spring Rain (album) =

Studio album by Hennie Bekker
- Released: April 1992
- Genre: New age
- Label: Abbeywood

Spring Rain is an album by Zambian born Canadian composer Hennie Bekker. The album is the first release in Bekker's Kaleidoscopes series of four albums including Summer Breeze, Spring Rain, Autumn Magic, and Winter Reflections. Spring Rain is a new age classic of original, contemporary instrumental compositions. The album was released in April 1992 and originally distributed by the now defunct Canadian independent distributor Holborne Distributing Co. The album is now released on the Toronto, Ontario, Canada, based independent record label Abbeywood Records.
