= The Armed Man =

Mass composed by Karl Jenkins

- A Mass for Peace
- by Karl Jenkins
- Catalogue: BH12255
- Genre: Mass
- Commissioned by: Royal Armouries
- Text: Parts of the Ordinary of the Mass; additional sacred and secular texts
- Language: Latin; English; French; Arabic
- Based on: L’homme armé
- Composed: 1999
- Dedication: Kosovo War Victims
- Performed: 25 April 2000: London
- Published: 21 June 2010
- Publisher: Boosey & Hawkes
- Duration: 63'
- Movements: 13
- Scoring: Solo female voice; solo cello; mixed choir; orchestra

Premiere
- Date: 25 April 2000
- Location: Royal Albert Hall
- Conductor: Grant Llewellyn
- Performers: London Philharmonic Orchestra & National Youth Choir of Great Britain

The Armed Man: A Mass for Peace is a mass by Welsh composer Karl Jenkins written in reflection of the passing of ‘the most war-torn and destructive century in human history’ and as a message of hope that the world of the future would have more peace and fewer wars. It was commissioned by the Royal Armouries Museum for the Millennium celebrations, to mark the museum's move from London to Leeds, and was dedicated to victims of the Kosovo crisis.

Like Benjamin Britten's War Requiem before it, it is essentially an anti-war piece and is based on the Catholic Mass, which Jenkins combines with other sources, principally the 15th-century folk song "L'homme armé" in the first and last movements, as well as during the Kyrie. It was written for SATB chorus with soloists (soprano and muezzin) and a symphonic orchestra.

== Overview ==
In addition to extracts from the Ordinary of the Mass, the text incorporates words from other religious and historical sources, including the Islamic call to prayer, the Bible (e.g., the Psalms and Revelation) and the Mahabharata. Writers whose words appear in the work include Rudyard Kipling, Alfred Lord Tennyson, and Sankichi Toge, who survived the Hiroshima bombing but died some years later of leukaemia.

The Armed Man charts the growing menace of a descent into war, interspersed with moments of reflection, shows the horrors that war brings, and ends with the hope for peace in a new millennium, when "sorrow, pain and death can be overcome". It begins with a representation of marching feet, overlaid later by the shrill tones of a piccolo impersonating the flutes of a military band with the 15th-century French words of "The Armed Man". After the reflective pause of the Call to Prayer and the Kyrie, "Save Us From Bloody Men" appeals for God's help against our enemies in words from the Book of Psalms (Psalm 59). The Sanctus has a military, menacing air, followed by Kipling's "Hymn Before Action". "Charge!" draws on words from John Dryden's "A song for St. Cecilia's day" (1687) and Jonathan Swift citing Horace (Odes 3,2,13), beginning with martial trumpets and song, but ending in the agonised screams of the dying. This is followed by the eerie silence of the battlefield after action, broken by a lone trumpet playing the Last Post. "Angry Flames" describes the appalling scenes after the bombing of Hiroshima, and "Torches" parallels this with an excerpt from the Mahabharata (book 1, chapter 228), describing the terror and suffering of animals dying in the burning of the Khandava Forest. Agnus Dei is followed by "Now the Guns have Stopped", written by Guy Wilson himself as part of a Royal Armouries display on the guilt felt by some returning survivors of World War I. After the Benedictus, "Better is Peace" ends the mass on a note of hope, drawing on the hard-won understanding of Lancelot and Guinevere that peace is better than war, on Tennyson's poem "Ring Out, Wild Bells" and on the text from Revelation 21:4: "God shall wipe away all tears".

== Derived works ==
In 2002, Boosey & Hawkes published a chorale suite with excerpts from the work for choir and orchestra (or organ), containing Kyrie, Sanctus, Benedictus, Agnus Dei and "Hymn before Action". Jenkins wrote an Agnus Dei setting for choir a cappella based on the material from the Agnus Dei from the mass, basically assigning the chords of the accompaniment to divided male voices.

== Performances ==
The Armed Man: A Mass for Peace was premiered at the Royal Albert Hall, London, on 25 April 2000, performed by the National Youth Choir of Great Britain and the National Musicians Symphony Orchestra with Julian Lloyd Webber as the cello soloist, and conducted by Grant Llewellyn.

The work has subsequently been performed in a number of commemorative and international contexts. In 2007, Jenkins conducted The Armed Man at Johannesburg City Hall in South Africa with the University of Johannesburg Choir and four additional choirs; the event was associated with the live use of Hefin Owen's accompanying film for the work. On 11 September 2011, Jenkins conducted the work at Avery Fisher Hall, Lincoln Center, New York, in a concert commemorating the tenth anniversary of the September 11 attacks, with The Really Big Chorus and the Distinguished Concerts Orchestra International.

In 2014, the work received its first performance in Sofia during the European Music Festival at Bulgaria Hall, performed by the Rousse Philharmonic Orchestra, the "Dounavski Zvutsi" mixed choir and the "Dounavski Vulni" children's choir, conducted by Nayden Todorov. In March 2015, the Kosovo Philharmonic marked its 15th anniversary with the Pristina premiere of the work, performed by the Kosovo Philharmonic Orchestra and Choir and conducted by Baki Jashari; the performance was preceded by a pre-premiere in Gjakova, one of the areas affected by the Kosovo War.

In 2018, performances of the work formed part of centenary commemorations of the end of the First World War. On 2 November 2018, Jenkins conducted it at the Mercedes-Benz Arena in Berlin with the World Orchestra for Peace and the World Choir for Peace, a choir of about 2,000 singers from more than 30 countries. A recording of the Berlin performance, with the World Orchestra for Peace, World Choir for Peace and Jenkins as conductor, was later released by C Major. On 11 November 2018, the Brisbane Symphony Orchestra presented the work in Australia for Armistice Day centenary commemorations.

The work was performed at the Cathedral of St Paul in Wellington, New Zealand on 22 March 2019, in tribute to the Muslim community of New Zealand following the Christchurch mosque shootings on 15 March 2019. The performance was sung by members of the Wellington choral community and directed by Michael Stewart, with organ, percussion, soloists and muezzin.

The piece is one of Jenkins' most popular works and is regularly performed by professional and amateur musicians. By 2023 it had received nearly 3,000 performances worldwide. The 3,000th performance was held at the Royal Albert Hall on 10 March 2024, in a celebration of Karl Jenkins' 80th birthday, under the leadership of Jenkins himself.

== Recordings ==
The Armed Man: A Mass for Peace

Studio album by Karl Jenkins
- Released: 10 September 2001
- Recorded: 2000, 2001
- Studios: AIR (London, UK); Angel (London, UK)
- Genre: Classical; Choral
- Length: 67:22
- Label: Virgin
- Producer: Karl Jenkins

Karl Jenkins chronology
Adiemus IV: The Eternal Knot (2001)	The Armed Man: A Mass for Peace (2001)	Adiemus V: Vocalise (2003)

The first CD release was recorded at AIR Studios during summer 2000 by the London Philharmonic Orchestra conducted by Karl Jenkins and The National Youth Choir of Great Britain conducted by Mike Brewer, and released on the Virgin label on 10 September 2001.

=== Track listing ===
1. "The Armed Man" – 6:25
2. "The Call to Prayers (Adhaan)" – 2:04
3. "Kyrie" – 8:12
4. "Save Me from Bloody Men" – 1:42
5. "Sanctus" – 7:00
6. "Hymn Before Action" – 2:38
7. "Charge!" – 7:26
8. "Angry Flames" – 4:44
9. "Torches" – 2:58
10. "Agnus Dei" – 3:39
11. "Now the Guns Have Stopped" – 3:25
12. "Benedictus" – 7:36
13. "Better Is Peace" – 9:33

In October 2010, a special edition re-release of the album added a 14th track, and was packaged with a bonus DVD of a live performance of the work:

14. "For The Fallen: In Memoriam Alfryn Jenkins" – 4:41

This special edition with the additional track was rereleased on vinyl for Record Store Day in 2018.

=== Personnel ===
- London Philharmonic Orchestra
- Karl Jenkins – conductor
- National Youth Choir of Great Britain
- Mohammed Gad – muezzin
- Guy Johnston – cello
- Tristan Hambleton – treble vocals
- Jody K Jenkins – additional percussion
- Dave Hassell – additional percussion
- Neil Percy – additional percussion

== Links with other works by Karl Jenkins ==
The track "Sanctus" shares its theme with the Adiemus piece "Immrama" which was introduced on the album set More Journey: Adiemus New Best & Live. "Benedictus" borrows its theme from "The Eternal Knot" from Adiemus IV: The Eternal Knot.

== Other media ==
There are two films made to accompany live performances of The Armed Man:

1. The Armed Man Film was created by film maker and director Hefin Owen, and was premiered in its current form in Johannesburg, South Africa in September 2007 with Karl Jenkins conducting. "The film echoes and traces the story as told in the text of the work; the build-up to conflict, conflict itself and the aftermath, finally looking forward to a better future," says Karl Jenkins.

2. The Armed Boy, an original film that was created exclusively to accompany live performances of The Armed Man, premiered in March 2007. The story of the film revolves around a young boy who suffers under the merciless hands of a bully and his gang. When he finally retaliates, he learns the greater consequences of taking up arms — an allegorical representation of Jenkins' call for peace in times of war. Created by Robert Cucuzza and Thomas Cucuzza, the film was designed to correspond harmoniously with the theme and tone of each individual piece and the footage was edited in precise synchronicity with Jenkins' music. The Armed Boy was commissioned by Rackham Symphony Choir and premiered in Detroit, Michigan on 25 March 2007. In January 2008, the filmmakers were presented with a Peace Award at the Ninth Annual World Sabbath of Religious Reconciliation for their work on the film.

== Instrumentation ==
The mass is scored for a large symphony orchestra with extensive percussion.

- Piccolo
- 2 flutes (both doubling piccolo)
- 2 oboes
- Cor anglais
- 2 clarinets in B♭
- Bass clarinet in B♭
- 2 bassoons
- Contrabassoon
- 4 horns in F
- 4 trumpets in B♭
- 3 trombones
- Tuba
- Timpani
- Solo cello in 12th movement – 'Benedictus'
- Strings

Five percussionists play:

- 3 snare drums
- Field drum
- 4 tom-toms
- Surdo
- Floor toms
- Cymbals
- 2 bass drums
- Chekere
- Congas
- Drum kit
- Tam-tam
- Triangle
- Taiko drum
- Wind chimes
- Mark tree
- Tenor drum
- Tambourine
- Tambourim
- Tubular bells
