= Leslie Sullivan =

English-born Rhodesian radio host (1916–1978)

Personal details
- Born: Leslie Smulian; 11 April 1916; England, United Kingdom
- Died: 1978 (aged 61–62); Rhodesia
- Occupation: Radio personality

Military service
- Allegiance: United Kingdom
- Branch/service: South African Army (Transvaal Scottish Regiment)
- Battles/wars: World War II

Leslie Sullivan (11 April 1916 – 1978), born Leslie Smulian, was an English-born Rhodesian radio host who worked for the Rhodesian Broadcasting Corporation. He hosted the Radio Rhodesia morning show for much of his career. In the 1960s and 70s, he was the most popular radio personality in Rhodesia.

Born in England, Sullivan emigrated to South Africa with his parents as a young man, and served in the South African Army in World War II. He relocated to Portuguese Mozambique in 1952, where he first worked in radio broadcasting. In 1959, he took a job working for the Federal Broadcasting Corporation, and relocated to Southern Rhodesia, hosting the Radio Rhodesia morning show. Sullivan died in 1978 in Rhodesia.

== Early life ==
Leslie Smulian (later changed to Sullivan) was born on 11 April 1916 in England, United Kingdom. As a young man, he trained in London with Samuel Messener as an estate agent. In 1938, he moved to the Union of South Africa with his parents. During World War II, he served in the Second Battalion of the Transvaal Scottish Regiment.

== Career ==
=== Early career ===
Upon completing his military service, Sullivan returned to South Africa, and worked selling commercial properties for businessman J. H. Isaacs. He then worked as a salesman selling Gestetner photocopiers. Though he was a successful salesman, he wished for a career change. In March 1952, he started work at Lourenço Marques (LM) Radio as an announcer. He soon became one of the most popular LM Radio announcers.

=== Radio Rhodesia career ===
In 1958, after six years at LM Radio, Sullivan was offered a position as an announcer and producer at the Federal Broadcasting Corporation (later the Rhodesian Broadcasting Corporation and today the Zimbabwe Broadcasting Corporation). The FBC was based in Salisbury, Southern Rhodesia (then part of the Federation of Rhodesia and Nyasaland). Commercial radio was just being introduced in Rhodesia at that time, and Sullivan was hired as the first morning announcer on the new commercial service when it started on 6 April 1958.

Sullivan would arrive at the studio about 45 minutes before Radio Rhodesia went on air each morning, and would have a "power sleep," waking just before the show started. At about five minutes before 6:00, he would present his "thought for the day," usually an inspiration message. Between 6:00 and 6:30, news and the weather forecast were reported, then some music would play, and then Sullivan would go back on air. He greeted the audience with "Six-thirty, get up up up up up!" to wake up the listeners. That was usually followed by a children's song, though his audience included many adults as well. Hennie Bekker was the show's resident pianist. The program also included a segment in which Sullivan would welcome new Rhodesian immigrants by name. He would also commonly tell jokes, many of which had a radio quality (for example: "What do you call an African terrorist financed by Rowntrees Trust? ... A chocolate soldier.")

Sullivan was, for most of the Rhodesia's history, the most popular radio personality in the country. The Prime Minister Roy Welensky said that after himself, Sullivan was the most popular person in Rhodesia. With his catchphrase "Your little ray of sunshine," he was the best known media broadcaster. He remained with the Rhodesian Broadcasting Corporation until his retirement from radio in 1976, and was succeeded by Leslie McKenzie. He died in 1978.
