= Hennie Bekker =

- Born: Nkana, Northern Rhodesia
- Genres: Electronic, instrumental, new-age, ambient, world
- Occupations: Composer, producer, pianist
- Instruments: Piano, synthesizer
- Years active: 1959–present
- Label: Abbeywood Records
- Website: henniebekker.com

Hennie Bekker (born 1934) is a Zambian-born composer, arranger, producer and keyboardist based in Toronto, Ontario, Canada. His work includes jazz fusion, film scoring, new-age and techno. Bekker won a Juno Award for his work with techno-driven trio BKS.

Bekker composed, arranged (in the case of the public domain classical works), and performed the soft melodies and the nature-driven environmental music on the first 14 albums of Dan Gibson's Solitudes - Exploring Nature with Music series, including the 1989 best-selling, quadruple-platinum Harmony. He was named "one of the most prolific and successful figures in contemporary Canadian pop music" by Billboard. Over a period of more than sixty years, Bekker has recorded over 60 albums, most recently on his own Toronto, Ontario-based Abbeywood Records label.

== Early years ==
Bekker was born in the Zambian Copper Belt mining town of Nkana, Kitwe, and raised 48 km down the road in Mufulira. Bekker first became enamored with piano when, at the age of six, he heard his aunt Ria play the instrument. After his parents bought him a small piano, Bekker taught himself to play, at first studying pianists Carmen Cavallaro, Eddy Duchin and later the sounds of the jazz greats Art Tatum, George Shearing, Oscar Peterson and Bill Evans for inspiration. In 1945, the family relocated to Bulawayo, Southern Rhodesia (later Zimbabwe). He attended Milton Junior School and then the Bulawayo Technical High School.

== Musical career ==
=== 1950s to mid-1960s ===
At age 15, Bekker and five of his friends formed a band called "The Youth Marvels" playing the hits of the day. Beginning at age 22, he performed with band leader Gerry DeVos for a few years until he formed his first band, the Hennie Bekker Trio with bassist Noel Kidwell and Drummer Eddie Van Diermen. Bekker then moved to Salisbury, Rhodesia (now Harare). During this period, he also served as a resident pianist for the Rhodesian Broadcasting Corporation's morning show featuring Rhodesian radio host Leslie Sullivan. In late 1961, after a three-month stint in Elizabethville (now called Lubumbashi) in the Congo was cut short due to the Katanga war, Bekker decided to move to Johannesburg, South Africa, where he became a session musician. He returned to Salisbury in 1962 with his band to play at the Bretts supper club until the end of 1963. Bekker and his band, Doug Graham on bass, drummer Eddie Van Diermen drums and vocalist Derek Graham, then went to Luanda, Angola for a short stint at the Club Naval. The band returned to South Africa in 1964, and was booked into an 18-month residency at the Riviera Hotel in Durban.

=== Mid-1960s to late-1960s: The hotel circuit, Gallo ===
In January 1966, after the Durban gig, the band did a one-year stint at the Mikado night club in Johannesburg. Bekker went on to front a number of bands bearing his name, and played the South African hotel circuit, notably 'Bretts' at the Criterion Hotel in Johannesburg. He followed that up by becoming a staff record producer and music director as well as working with record producer Billy Forrest at venerable Gallo Africa, the eventual record label home of such international superstars as Ladysmith Black Mambazo, Mahlathini and the Mahotella Queens, Miriam Makeba, Hugh Masekela, Juluka, Lucky Dube and Letta Mbulu. During this period Bekker's skill as an arranger would become evident, and in the years following, and well into the 80s, he arranged, and in some cases produced or co-produced countless works for well-known South African artists. Also during this period (and into the early 70s), he released a number of solo albums (LPs) on labels such as His Master's Voice, EMI and Gallo.

=== Early to mid-1970s: London, arrangements, Teal ===
In 1970, Bekker travelled to London, where he worked as musical director and played Piano in Galt McDermot's West End show "Isabel’s a Jezebel" at the Duchess Theatre. He also did TV work, and on occasion, played keyboards with the band in "Hair" and the show "Promises, Promises". During that time he also did arrangements for various producers, and played solo piano gigs in hotels. After five months in London, Bekker returned to Johannesburg to become musical director for Billy Forrest's newly formed "Intercontinental Record Company" (IRC). He released an album Turn On for this label. In 1972, IRC was bought by Teal (then a Polygram company), and Bekker became musical director for the Teal Group. For Teal, Bekker produced and arranged singles and albums for various South African artists, many of which were engineered by John Linderman. Bekker then moved into the electronic-based world of the jazz rock hybrid fusion. A residency at the jazz club "The Branch Office" was one of Bekker's regular gigs, with bandmates guitarist Johnny Fourie, drummer Tony Moore and bassist/arranger/composer/producer Johnny Boshoff. At about the same time, he began to write jingles, and over the next 12 years, would compose about 500 of them to air on South African Broadcasting Corporation, recording the same jingle in the nine different African languages besides English and Afrikaans in order to meet the SABC policy of servicing the African nations within their broadcast area.

=== Late 1970s to mid-1980s: London, album production, jingles ===
In 1979, Bekker traveled to London and, with producer Emil Zoghby, co-produced and played keyboards on the 1978 album Prisoners On The Line by the U.K. based folk rock group Magna Carta, and arranged and conducted pianist/bandleader Stanley Black's 1979 LP Digital Magic. He later returned to Johannesburg to score several of motion pictures, most notably Target of an Assassin, starring two-time Academy Award winner Anthony Quinn. In the seven years that followed, Bekker continued working as a jingle writer, and composed, recorded and performed music for local and international Television shows. He also worked on a number of albums for South African artists. Bekker, by this time, was an established arranger, working in large studios using professional audio recording and processing equipment, but up to this point he had written music by hand. He now established himself as an electronic musician by being the first South African musician to own a Synclavier. Many of Bekker's early New Age albums were composed on Synclavier, and he continued to use it until the mid-90s. Other album projects done in the early 80s included New Age style score for an early IMAX type show at Sun City called "Solar Vibrations", the soundtrack to which was released as an LP.

=== 1987 to present: Relocation to Canada, Solitudes, BKS, Junos, African Tapestries ===
In 1987, Bekker and his wife Jacky immigrated to Canada, and worked John Parry Music to produce cue music for production libraries. In 1989, he was recruited by Somerset Entertainment Producer Gordon Gibson to add music to his father Dan's Solitudes environmental recordings. Their first collaboration, Harmony, sold over 400,000 copies, and Bekker provided the music for 13 more gold, platinum and multi-platinum Solitudes titles before striking out on his own with 'the first album in his Kaleidoscopes series, Spring Rain with Holborne Distributing and later, Tranquility, through Quality Records.

His Quality years also led him into the BKS techno-dance trio partnership with DJ Chris Sheppard and Greg Kavanagh, churning out three albums – For Those About to Rave, We Salute You (featuring the Juno-nominated dance chart-topper "I’m in Love with You"), Dreamcatcher and Astroplane, which contained the Juno-winning 1997 Best Dance Recording track "Astroplane (City of Love mix)". The trio toured across Canada, filling dance clubs from Halifax to Vancouver, and spurred more gold and platinum certifications of several dance mix compilations.

During the BKS days, Bekker continued to work with Dan and Gordon Gibson - putting out a further five albums in the Solitudes series. Having established himself as an environmental and new age composer, he also composed, arranged and produced a number of a number of albums of soothing, meditative, nature-inspired albums that were distributed by Holborne Distributing Co. Bekker incorporated his interpretations of familiar classics, carols and lullabies on various albums including Lullabies. Albums in the Classical Tapestries series, Relaxing Pachelbel, Bekker's own rendition of "Vivaldi's Four Seasons" and "The Classics" built on the success of the Classical-based Solitudes - Exploring Nature with Music albums, including the million-plus selling The Classics. Many of the albums distributed by Holborne were sub-licensed to Northword Press (NatureQuest/Northsound) and released under different names, including several of the Tranquility albums. Between 1993 and 1996 Bekker added four more albums to his Kaleidoscopes series (Summer Breeze, Autumn Magic, Winter Reflections and Christmas Spirit). The multi-platinum-selling African Tapestries series, a fusion of new-age and world music interwoven with the diverse sounds of the African wilderness, was created in 1995, with the release of the first album, Temba. Following the shutdown of Quality Music in the late 90s, Bekker reissued the Tranquility albums, incorporating them into a new series, the Hennie Bekker’s Tranquility series. He also composed a further three albums for the series, namely Essence of Romance, Romantic Classics and A Time for Romance.

In 2003, following the shutdown of Holborne Distributing, Bekker began reissuing the albums previously distributed through Holborne (including reworked versions) on Abbeywood Records. In 2009 Bekker released the latest album in the African Tapestries series, Amani, and added the African-inspired album Jabula, previously licensed to Somerset Entertainment. In the same year, a limited edition five CD box set, the African Tapestries collection, including all five albums was released. Also in 2009, Bekker released an album of contemporary music called Moving On which combined relaxation and world music with jazz and featured Canadian musicians, including longtime collaborators Greg Kavanagh, EVI and trumpeter Bruce Cassidy and saxophonist and EWI John Johnson. On this album, Bekker moved on from the primarily electronic albums of his past, using acoustic drums, electronic wind instruments and guitars. A compilation entitled Spectrum - An Anthology of Relaxing Instrumental Music, featuring fourteen tracks from eleven different albums was released in August 2011.

Bekker has 23 Canadian album certifications, including gold, platinum, double and triple-platinum.
