= Harusame =

Harusame (Japanese 春雨 （はるさめ） "spring rain") may refer to:

- Harusame, the name of several Japanese naval vessels
- Harusame, a painting by Kawai Gyokudō
- Harusame, a traditional hauta (ja:端唄（はうた）), a form of jiuta tune
- "Harusame", (ja), a song by Kōzō Murashita
- Harusame Monogatari (English: The Tales of Spring Rain) a book by Ueda Akinari
- Harusame noodle (ja), a starch-based noodle also known as glass noodles or cellophane noodles
- Harusame Youbi, a Japanese video game for the Dreamcast console
