= Japanese destroyer Harusame =

Four Japanese destroyers have borne the name Harusame:

- Japanese destroyer Harusame (1902) was a Harusame-class destroyer launched in 1902 and wrecked in 1911.
- Japanese destroyer Harusame (1935) was a Shiratsuyu-class destroyer launched in 1935 and sunk in 1944.
- JDS Harusame (DD-109) was a Murasame-class destroyer launched in 1959 and stricken in 1989.
- JS Harusame is a Murasame-class destroyer launched in 1995.
