= Adiemus: Songs of Sanctuary =

Studio album by Adiemus, Karl Jenkins
- Released: 1995
- Recorded: 1994–1995
- Genres: New-age; worldbeat
- Length: 53:49
- Label: Jenkins Ratledge
- Producer: Jenkins Ratledge

Adiemus, Karl Jenkins chronology
Adiemus: Songs of Sanctuary (1995)	Adiemus II: Cantata Mundi (1997)

Professional ratings
Review scores
Source	Rating
AllMusic	3/5 stars

Adiemus: Songs of Sanctuary is the first album by Welsh composer Karl Jenkins, recorded in 1994 and released the next year as part of the Adiemus project. The title track "Adiemus" was used prior to the album's release in a 1994 Delta Air Lines television commercial (as well as related Delta Air Lines media around this time, including pre-departure videos aboard Delta flights).

== Track listing ==
All tracks by Karl Jenkins.

No.	Title	Length
1.	"Adiemus"	4:01
2.	"Tintinnabulum"	10:57
3.	"Cantus Inaequalis"	3:13
4.	"Cantus Insolitus"	5:35
5.	"In Caelum Fero"	7:45
6.	"Cantus Iteratus"	6:36
7.	"Amaté Adea"	5:12
8.	"Kayama"	8:06
9.	"Hymn"	2:38

== Personnel ==
Musicians

- Karl Jenkins – conductor, orchestration
- Mike Ratledge – programmed percussion
- Frank Ricotti – improvised percussion
- Jody Barratt Jenkins – additional percussion
- Miriam Stockley – vocals
- Mike Taylor – quena, soloist
- Mary Carewe – additional vocals
- Pamela Thorby – recorder
- Robert St. John Wright – conductor, leader, orchestra leader
- London Philharmonic Orchestra

Production

- Karl Jenkins – production, liner notes
- Mike Ratledge – production
- Jason Day – project coordinator
- Steve Price – engineer, mixing
- Gary Thomas – engineer
- Kirsten Cowie – assistant engineer
- Stephen Frost – mastering, mixing
- Simon Heyworth – mastering, remastering
- Helen Hodkinson – executive producer
- Michael Senn – music copyist
- Rina Cheung – artwork
- Douglas Brothers – photography
- Phil Knott – photography
- Peter Mountain – photography
- Recorded and mixed at Angel Recording Studios, Islington, London

== Singles and alternative versions ==
Common to albums in the Adiemus project, releases in different regions may have different cover art and may include additional tracks. The Japanese release of Songs of Sanctuary features a tenth track titled "Adiemus (Full Version)" which is a longer version of the first track "Adiemus". A limited edition release of Songs of Sanctuary features additional edited versions of "Tintinnabulum" and "Kayama".

An "Adiemus" CD single was released featuring an edited version of the track, a longer version, and a percussion rendition. "Kayama" was also released as a single with two versions of this piece as well as alternate arrangements of "Hymn" and "Adiemus". The "Adiemus Remix" CD single comprises four dance remixes of the song. Similarly, "Kayama Remix" features five dance remixes of the piece "Kayama". A final CD single release has two different length versions of "Tintinnabulum" along with the track "Cantus Iteratus".

"Cantus Insolitus" borrows its theme from the largo movement of Jenkins' Palladio, as heard on Diamond Music. Four instrumental variations on the title track "Adiemus" are also featured on Diamond Music.

A completely new remaster by Simon Heyworth was released on SACD in 2003, providing a considerable improvement in clarity to the entire work. This is the highest resolution release of any of the Adiemus releases to date and is the closest to an HD version of any Adiemus material.

The tracks "Kayama", "Hymn" and "Adiemus" are remastered on the 2006 Japanese-only CD release Adiemus and Karl Jenkins – The Complete Best but still only to CD quality.

== Charts ==
=== Weekly charts ===
Weekly chart performance for Adiemus: Songs of Sanctuary
Chart (1995–2000)	Peak position
Austrian Albums (Ö3 Austria)	15
Belgian Albums (Ultratop Flanders)	22
Belgian Albums (Ultratop Wallonia)	13
Dutch Albums (Album Top 100)	11
Finnish Albums (Suomen virallinen lista)	2
French Albums (SNEP)	5
German Albums (Offizielle Top 100)	8
Swiss Albums (Schweizer Hitparade)	13
UK Albums (Official Charts)	35
UK Classical Artist Albums (OCC)	17
UK Classical Compilation Albums (OCC)	29

Chart (2026)	Peak position
Belgian Classical Albums (Ultratop Flanders)	20

=== Year-end charts ===
Year-end chart performance for Adiemus: Songs of Sanctuary
Chart (1995)	Position
Dutch Albums (Album Top 100)	74
German Albums (Offizielle Top 100)	31
Swiss Albums (Schweizer Hitparade)	45

Chart (1997)	Position
French Albums (SNEP)	50

== Certifications ==
Certifications for Songs of Sanctuary
Region	Certification	Certified units/sales
Austria (IFPI Austria)	Gold	25,000^{*}
Finland (Musiikkituottajat)	Platinum	66,759
France (SNEP)	2× Gold	200,000^{*}
Germany (BVMI)	Gold	250,000^{^}
Netherlands (NVPI)	Gold	50,000^{^}
Spain (Promusicae)	Gold	50,000^{^}
Switzerland (IFPI Switzerland)	Gold	25,000^{^}
United Kingdom (BPI)	Gold	100,000^{^}
^{*} Sales figures based on certification alone.^{^} Shipments figures based on certification alone.
