= Dendropsophus tintinnabulum =

Conservation status
- Data Deficient (IUCN 3.1)

Scientific classification
- Kingdom: Animalia
- Phylum: Chordata
- Class: Amphibia
- Order: Anura
- Family: Hylidae
- Genus: Dendropsophus
- Species: D. tintinnabulum

Binomial name
- Dendropsophus tintinnabulum (Melin, 1941)

Synonyms
- Hyla tintinnabulum Melin, 1941

Species of frog

Dendropsophus tintinnabulum is a species of frog in the family Hylidae. It is endemic to Brazil and only known from its type locality along the Uaupés River, "some days' journey north of Ipanoré", in the Amazonas state.

== Description ==
Dendropsophus tintinnabulum is a small but sturdy frog. Three males in the type series measured 19–20 mm (0.75–0.79 in) in snout–vent length (females were not collected). The eye is large and prominent. The tympanum is indistinct. The canthus rostralis is blunt. Fingers are almost one-fourth webbed, whereas the toes (which are orange) are two-thirds webbed. Discs are small. The dorsum is grayish green and the venter is bluish green.

The male advertisement call has a brittle, bell-like sound.

== Habitat and conservation ==
These frogs probably live in the understory vegetation of tropical rainforest. The type collection was made by a small side river where many individuals were sitting on tall grasses and Melastomataceae bushes and calling. Threats to this little known species are unknown.
