= Adiemus (albums) =

Series of new-age music albums

Adiemus /ædiˈeɪməs/ is a series of new-age music albums by Welsh composer Karl Jenkins. It is also the title of the opening track on the first album of the series, Adiemus: Songs of Sanctuary, recorded in 1994 and released the next year.

== Concept and origins ==
Each Adiemus album is a collection of song-length pieces featuring harmonised vocal melody against an orchestra background.

The vocal parts are not written in an actual language, despite some of the lyrics bearing a passing similarity to Latin. The 'words' were written phonetically by Jenkins to match the orchestral parts, with the intention being to have the voices act purely as another instrument.

The word adiemus itself resembles the Latin word adeamus, meaning "let us approach" (or "let us submit a cause to a referee"), or is sometimes regarded as the future tense of the same verb, meaning "we shall approach" or "we shall take possession". The title also resembles two forms of the Latin verb audire ("to hear"): audiemus ("we shall hear") and audiamus ("let us hear"), although Jenkins has said he was unaware of any connections to real Latin words.

The titular piece on Adiemus – Songs of Sanctuary was originally composed for a Delta Air Lines TV commercial. The piece gained significant popularity as a result, and Jenkins then decided to expand it into a full work.

== Instrumentation and performers ==
Scoring for Songs of Sanctuary
recorder, 8 percussion, 4 tom-toms, congas, cymbals, claves, floor tom, bass drum, mark tree, bass bell in C, cabasa, wood block, triangle, strings
Scoring for Cantata Mundi
2 flutes (1 doubling on piccolo), 2 oboes (1 doubling on English horn), 2 clarinets, 2 bassoons, 6 horns, 3 trumpets, 4 trombones, tuba, timpani, claves, cowbell, güiro, 2 cabasas, triangle, chenchen, Egyptian tabla, duhulla, tom-tom, cymbals, shekere, xylophone, glockenspiel, bass marimba, bongos, rek, udu pot, tablas, sticks, pandeiro, timbales, surdo, bass drum, tamtam, suspended cymbals, tambourine, recorder, strings (featuring on album are also the violin, electro-acoustic percussion and gemshorn)
Scoring for Dances of Time
7 singers, 2 flutes, 2 oboes, 2 clarinets, 2 bassoons, 6 horns, 3 trumpets, 4 trombones, tuba, timpani, 8 percussionists: bass drum, bongos, cowbell, shekere, chocalho, cymbals, claves, congas, cabasa, castanets, dholak, güiro, 5 low drums, low chekere, marimba, rainmaker, rek, snare drum, shaker, surdo, tom-tom, tabla, tamborim, tambourine, triangle, udo, wood block, xylophone, recorder, strings (featuring on album are also the electro-acoustic percussion and gemshorn)
Scoring for The Eternal Knot
recorder, accordion, percussion, harp, strings (on album also the acoustic guitar, uilleann pipes)
Scoring for Vocalise
for voices and orchestra

Session singer Miriam Stockley performed the vocal parts on the first four albums. Stockley was described by Jenkins as central to the Adiemus project due to her range and intonation; however, she was not re-engaged for Vocalise. Additional vocals were provided by Mary Carewe on all but Dances of Time, which saw the introduction of the Finnish Adiemus Singers (who would later appear on Vocalise). Extra vocals and the chorus effects were created by overdubbing multitracked recordings of the singers (in some cases up to 40 times) and varying the speed of the tape.

The Songs of Sanctuary orchestra consisted of a string section augmented by various ethnic percussion instruments, with occasional further additions such as bells, a recorder and a quena. Mike Ratledge, with whom Jenkins had played in Soft Machine, contributed to the first album as well. Jenkins added brass and woodwind for Cantata Mundi, and continued to add more diverse instruments such as acoustic guitar on later albums. From Songs of Sanctuary to Dances of Time, the London Philharmonic Orchestra was used; Jenkins later formed his own Adiemus Orchestra to perform on The Eternal Knot recordings, returning to the London Philharmonic for Vocalise.

=== Singers ===
- Miriam Stockley
- Mary Carewe
- Pirjo Aittomäki
- Mervi Hiltunen
- Anna-Mari Kähärä
- Merja Rajala
- Säde Rissanen
- Hanna-Riikka Siitonen
- Mia Simanainen
- Nina Tapio
- Riikka Timonen

== Musical style ==
The musical language of Adiemus draws heavily on classical and world music. Jenkins follows conventions of tonality up to a point—his harmony is derived from gospel and African music, decorated with functional dissonances such as suspensions and with greater freedom of movement between loosely related key areas. He avoids the most common time signatures, such as 2/4, 3/4 and 4/4, with a slow 3/2 and 6/8, 9/8 and 5/8 (Cantus Inaequalis from Songs of Sanctuary). "Free time" is also prominent, in this as well as the majority of new age projects. The percussion section, when used prominently, gives the pieces an upbeat, tribal-like rhythm.

The sound of Adiemus is generally identified with new-age or Celtic music; The Eternal Knot is an explicitly Celtic-themed album that formed the soundtrack for the S4C documentary The Celts.

== Audience ==
Songs of Sanctuary was a commercial success, topping classical album charts. Though none of its successors has achieved the same critical acclaim, Adiemus acquired a cult following and maintained a place in mainstream consciousness through its use in TV commercials, in particular the track "Adiemus" in a Delta Air Lines commercial (for which the project began); "Cantilena", from Cantata Mundi, in a Cheltenham & Gloucester TV commercial and "Chorale VI (Sol–Fa) Cantus Song of Aeolus", in a Toyota Prius PHV TV commercial. "Adiemus" was also the eighth track of the 1997 re-issue of the Pure Moods compilation album. It was used at the beginning and end of James Brandon's magic show "Imagine" which played at the Luxor Las Vegas in the late 1990s and continues to be used as the soundtrack behind the Kubla Khan pillar show at the end of the Rotunda cave tour in Kartchner Caverns State Park in Arizona. In 1996, it was used in the Baywatch episode "Beauty and the Beast". "Tintinnabulum" was sampled in Solarstone's 1999 Ibiza trance anthem "Seven Cities".

== Albums ==
=== Adiemus: Songs of Sanctuary ===
1. "Adiemus" – 4:01
2. "Tintinnabulum" – 10:57
3. "Cantus Inaequalis" – 3:13
4. "Cantus Insolitus" – 5:35
5. "In Caelum Fero" – 7:45
6. "Cantus Iteratus" – 6:36
7. "Amaté Adea" – 5:12
8. "Kayama" – 8:06
9. "Hymn" – 2:38

=== Adiemus II: Cantata Mundi ===
Released in 1996, and building on the style established in Adiemus: Songs of Sanctuary, Jenkins broadens his musical approach to Cantata Mundi by including instrumentation and techniques from Eastern Europe, Arabia, and Asia. Compared to the earlier work, the orchestra is also expanded to include woodwinds and brass. The overall form of this album is a cantata of fourteen movements alternating between longer 'cantus' pieces and brief 'chorales'.

==== Track listing for Adiemus II ====
1. "Cantus – 'Song of Tears'" – 9:01
2. "Chorale I (Za Ma Ba)" – 1:50
3. "Cantus – 'Song of the Spirit'" – 6:09
4. "Chorale II (Roosh Ka Ma)" – 1:50
5. "Cantus – 'Song of the Trinity'" – 6:11
6. "Chorale III (Vocalise)" – 2:20
7. "Cantus – 'Song of the Odyssey'" – 7:25
8. "Chorale IV (Alame Oo Ya)" – 2:59
9. "Cantus – 'Song of the Plains'" – 11:26
10. "Chorale V (Arama Ivi)" – 1:21
11. "Cantus – 'Song of Invocation'" – 8:45
12. "Chorale VI (Sol–Fa)" / "Cantus – 'Song of Aeolus'" – 5:46
13. "Chorale VII (A Ma Ka Ma)" – 1:18
14. Bonus Track: "Cantilena" – 3:24
15. Bonus Track: "Elegia" – 4:06

==== Personnel for Adiemus II ====
- London Philharmonic Orchestra
- Karl Jenkins – conductor
- Miriam Stockley – vocals
- Mary Carewe – additional vocals in choruses
- Pamela Thorby – recorders and gemshorn
- Christopher Warren-Green – solo violin
- Jody Barratt-Jenkins – electro-acoustic percussion

==== Alternative versions ====
Several releases, including the United States release, of Cantata Mundi feature two bonus tracks, "Cantilena" and "Elegia", which are early musical sketches composed by Jenkins in preparation for this album.

As is common with Adiemus albums, the cover art of releases in certain regions may be different. The cover of the United States release features silhouetted people reminiscent of the cover art for Adiemus: Songs of Sanctuary in that region as well as the cover for Diamond Music. European releases depict an insect hive in various shades of reds and yellows within an abstracted mechanical clock. A special edition release in Europe shows a winged figure ascending into the sky. Other releases use dolphins which are characteristic of Adiemus albums in some markets.

=== Adiemus III: Dances of Time ===
Released in 1998, this album is a tribute to the interrelationship between music and dance throughout history. As such, most tracks are composed in a traditional style of dance, including meter.

In addition to the multitracked vocals used in the previous Adiemus recordings, Jenkins introduces the Finnish Adiemus Singers to perform the chorus to Miriam Stockley's lead.

==== Track listing for Adiemus III ====
1. "Corrente (Courante)" – 5:04
2. "Un Bolero Azul (Blue Bolero)" – 8:35
3. "La La La Koora (Ländler)" – 3:20
4. "Dawn Dancing" – 3:14
5. "Kaya Kakooya (Rumba)" – 4:34
6. "Intrada & Pavan" – 7:25
7. "Minuet" – 1:24
8. "Rain Dance" – 4:30
9. "African Tango" – 8:05
10. "Zarabanda (Sarabande)" – 4:36
11. "Ein Wiener Walzer (A Viennese Waltz)" – 4:59
12. "Hymn to the Dance" – 3:52
13. "Dos a Dos (Square dance)" – 4:15
14. "Tango" – 5:51

==== Alternate versions of Adiemus III ====
The final track "Tango" is an edited version of the track "African Tango" and is only available on some releases. A Japanese special edition release includes a second disc featuring "Beyond the Century (Makare Maka)" 4:54, "Elegia" 4:05 from some releases of Adiemus II: Cantata Mundi, "Hymn" 2:38 from Adiemus: Songs of Sanctuary, and an edited version of "Corrente" 4:23 from the first disc of this album.

As is common with Adiemus albums, the cover art of releases in certain regions may be different.

==== Personnel for Adiemus III ====
- Adiemus – performer
- David Buckland – photography
- Martin Giles – mastering
- Nick Harris & The Soundbarriers – assistant engineer
- Helen Hodkinson – executive producer, associate producer
- Jody Jenkins – electric drums
- Karl Jenkins – composer, conductor, producer, orchestration
- Dick Lewzey – engineer
- London Philharmonic Orchestra
- Matt Marshall – executive producer
- Russell Mills – artwork, design
- Duncan Riddell – orchestra leader
- Säde Rissanen – vocals
- Sheila Rock – photography
- Mia Simanainen – vocals
- Miriam Stockley – vocals
- Nina Tapio – vocals
- Pamela Thorby – recorder, gemshorn
- Riikka Väyrynen – vocals
- Michael Webster – design assistant

=== Adiemus IV: The Eternal Knot ===
Released in 2001, this album was inspired by Celtic history and mythology, and served as the soundtrack to the S4C International documentary The Celts. In addition to rich string orchestrations and vocals borrowing from world musical styles common to Adiemus, Jenkins adds the accompaniment of ethnic instruments such as the uilleann pipes and carnyx.

==== Track listing for Adiemus IV ====
1. "Cú Chullain" – 6:15
2. "The Eternal Knot" – 4:04
3. "Palace of the Crystal Bridge" – 3:42
4. "The Wooing of Étaín" – 5:25
5. "King of the Sacred Grove" – 6:05
6. "Saint Declan's Drone" – 3:58
7. "Salm O 'Dewi Sant'" – 4:23
8. "Connla's Well" – 4:19
9. "The Dagda" – 7:56
10. "Children of Dannu" – 3:32
11. "Ceridwen's Curse" – 4:30
12. "Hermit of the Sea Rock" – 1:45
13. "Isle of the Mystic Lake" – 3:16
14. "Math Was a Wizard" – 2:57

==== Personnel for Adiemus IV ====
- Adiemus Orchestra
- Karl Jenkins – conductor
- Miriam Stockley – vocals
- Mary Carewe – additional vocals in choruses
- Pamela Thorby – recorder
- Caryl Ebenezer – high soprano
- Davy Spillane – uilleann pipes
- Martin Taylor – acoustic guitar
- David Farmer – accordion
- Catrin Finch – harp
- Jody K Jenkins – carnyx effect and percussion

==== Alternate versions of Adiemus IV ====
The theme from "Salm O 'Dewi Sant'" is derived from "Psalm 27" of Jenkins's Dewi Sant. The theme from "The Dagda" was borrowed from "Lacus Pereverantiae" from Jenkins's earlier work Imagined Oceans. The theme for "Isle of the Mystic Lake" is that of "Palus Nebularum" also from Imagined Oceans. "The Eternal Knot" went on to become the theme for "Benedictus" from Jenkins's mass The Armed Man.

As is often the case with albums in the Adiemus project, releases in different regions may have different cover art. The cover Japanese release of Adieums IV: The Eternal Knot Has gold text and designs, including a dolphin, over a green background whereas other releases have white text over a Celtic knot on a bluish-green background.

=== Adiemus V: Vocalise ===
Released in 2003. In contrast to Jenkins's past Adiemus compositions, several of the tracks in this album are arrangements or variations on existing classical works. Additionally, the lyrics for some tracks are borrowed from religious texts or even the title of the piece rather than the invented phonetic language used exclusively in the preceding Adiemus albums. Adiemus V: Vocalise features the broadest range in musical styles and instrumentation of the series.

==== Track listing for Adiemus V ====
All tracks by Karl Jenkins

1. "Rondo" (after Violin Concerto (Beethoven)) – 4:09
2. "The Protector" (lyrics translated from Hebrew Grail text) – 4:11
3. "Allegrettango" (after Symphony No. 7 (Beethoven), second movement) – 6:01 (with Terry Barber, countertenor)
4. "Dona Nobis Pacem Part I" (lyrics from Agnus Dei of the Ordinary of the Mass) – 2:26
5. "Dona Nobis Pacem Part II" (lyrics from Agnus Dei of the Ordinary of the Mass) – 6:00
6. "Akruzam" (after mazurkas by Frédéric Chopin) – 4:29
7. "Schwanda the Bagpiper" (arrangement of Jaromír Weinberger's Švanda the Bagpiper) – 1:49
8. "Exit Schwanda" – 1:18
9. "Bendigedig" – 5:20 (with Terry Barber, countertenor)
10. "Schubert's Dance" (after Franz Schubert) – 3:20
11. "Berceuse pour un Enfant Solitaire" – 6:11
12. "Aria" (arrangement of "Cantilena" from Heitor Villa-Lobos's Bachianas Brasileiras) – 5:30 (with Terry Barber, countertenor, and Richard Harwood, cello)
13. "Mysterious are Your Ways" – 3:30
14. "Mi Contra Fa, Diabolus in Musica" – 5:55
15. "Vocalise" (arrangement of Sergei Rachmaninoff's "Vocalise") – 4:31 (with Terry Barber, countertenor)
16. encore: "Boogie Woogie Llanoogie" – 3:29

==== Personnel for Adiemus V ====
- Pirjo Aittomäki – vocals
- Terrance L. Barber Jr. – countertenor (vocal)
- Mary Carewe – vocals
- Paul Clarvis – percussion
- Helen Connolly – executive producer, associate producer
- Mark Feltham – harmonica
- Martin Giles – mastering
- Richard Harwood – cello
- Mervi Hiltunen – vocals, soloist
- Nigel Hitchcock – saxophone, wind controller
- Gavin Horsley – bass (vocal)
- Jody Barratt Jenkins – percussion, piano, programming, producer, editing
- Karl Jenkins – piano, arranger, conductor, producer, concept, song notes
- Anna-Mari Kähärä – vocals
- London Philharmonic Orchestra
- Steve Price – mixing
- Merja Rajala – vocals
- Säde Rissanen – vocals
- Pieter Schoeman – orchestra leader
- Hanna-Riikka Siitonen – vocals
- Mia Simanainen – vocals
- Belinda Sykes – vocals, soloist
- Nina Tapio – vocals
- Martin Taylor – guitar
- Pamela Thorby – recorder
- Riikka Timonen – vocals
- Paul Vozdic – cover photo
- Kenny Wheeler – flugelhorn
- Guy Wiffen – engineer

==== Singles and alternative versions ====
Common to albums in the Adiemus project, releases in different regions may have different cover art, such as the Japanese release of Adieums V: Vocalise.

=== Special albums ===
- 2000 – The Journey: The Best of Adiemus
- 2002 – Adiemus Live
- 2002 – Adiemus New Best & Live
- 2003 – The Essential Adiemus
- 2013 – Adiemus Colores
- 2017 – Symphonic Adiemus

== See also ==
- List of ambient music artists
