= Abbeywood Records =

Canadian independent record label (1999)

Abbeywood Records is a Canadian independent record label founded in 1999 in Toronto. The label is home to Zambian born Canadian composer Hennie Bekker and the World fusion group AO Music.
