= Mark tree =

Musical instrument

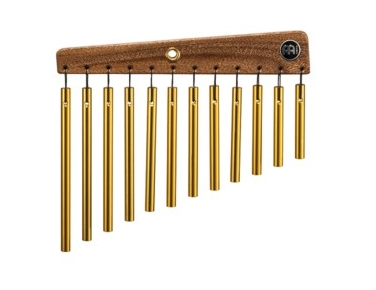
Bar chimes by Meinl

A mark tree (also known as a nail tree, chime tree, or bar chimes) is a percussion instrument used primarily for musical color. It consists of many small chimes—typically cylinders of solid aluminum or brass tubing about 3/8" in diameter—of varying lengths, hung from a bar. They are played by sweeping a finger or stick through the length of the hanging chimes. They are typically mounted in pitch order to produce rising or falling glissandos. More expensive models may also have a damper bar. Unlike tubular bells, another form of chime, the chimes on a mark tree do not produce definite pitches.

The mark tree is named after its inventor, studio percussionist Mark Stevens, who devised it in 1967. When he could not come up with a name, percussionist Emil Richards named it after Stevens. Mark trees are colloquially called wind chimes in some modern repertoire. However, the mark tree and wind chimes are two separate instruments, differing in construction and manner of sounding.

== See also ==
- Bell tree
