= Karl Jenkins =

Welsh musician and composer (born 1944)

Sir Karl Jenkins CBE FRAM HonFLSW
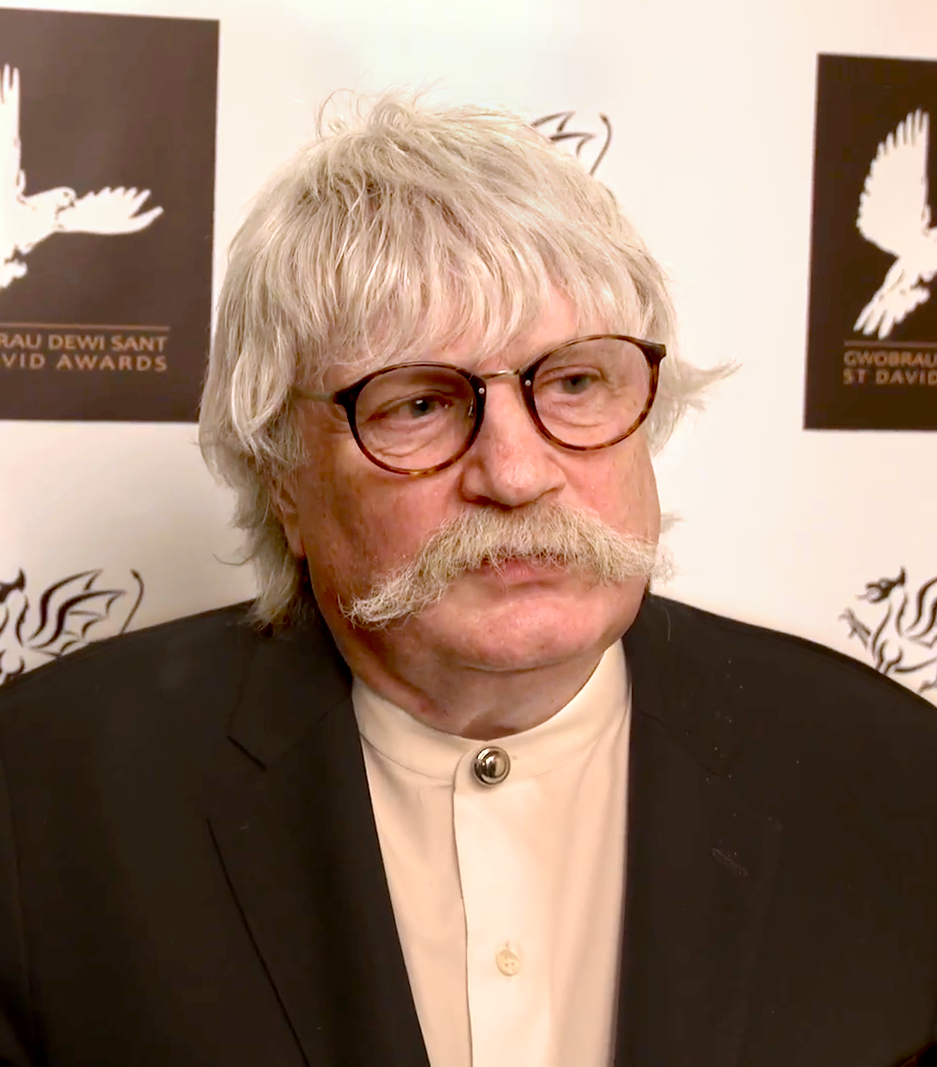
- Jenkins in 2017

Background information
- Born: Karl William Pamp Jenkins; 17 February 1944 (age 82); Penclawdd, Gower, Wales
- Genres: Jazz; rock; classical
- Occupations: Composer; musician
- Instruments: Keyboards; oboe; flute; saxophone
- Years active: 1970–present
- Labels: Virgin/EMI; EMI Classics; Deutsche Grammophon
- Formerly of: Nucleus; Adiemus; Soft Machine
- Website: karljenkins.com

Sir Karl William Pamp Jenkins (born 17 February 1944) is a Welsh multi-instrumentalist and composer. His best known works include the song "Adiemus" (1995, from the Adiemus album series), Palladio (1995), The Armed Man (2000), his Requiem (2005) and his Stabat Mater (2008).

Jenkins was educated in music at Cardiff University and the Royal Academy of Music, and he is a fellow and an associate of the latter. He joined the jazz-rock band Soft Machine in 1972 and became the group's lead songwriter in 1974. He continued to work with Soft Machine until 1984, but has not been involved with any incarnation of the group since. He has composed music for advertising campaigns and has won the industry prize twice.

== Life and career ==
=== Early life and education ===
Jenkins was born and raised in Penclawdd, Gower, Wales (now part of Swansea). His mother was half-Swedish, and his father was Welsh. He received his initial musical instruction from his father, who was the local schoolteacher, chapel organist and choirmaster.

His maternal grandfather was a Swedish sailor who settled in Wales after meeting his future wife at a local market. Between the ages of two and five, Jenkins lived in Gävle, Sweden, and continued to visit in subsequent years.

Jenkins attended Gowerton Grammar School, studied music at Cardiff University, and then commenced postgraduate studies in London at the Royal Academy of Music.

=== Early career: Graham Collier's group and Nucleus ===
For the bulk of his early career, Jenkins was known as a jazz and jazz-rock musician, playing baritone and soprano saxophones, keyboards and oboe, an unusual instrument in a jazz context. He joined jazz composer Graham Collier's group and later co-founded the jazz-rock group Nucleus, which won first prize at the Montreux Jazz Festival in 1970. In 1971, Jenkins collaborated with Linda Hoyle on her album Pieces of Me, co-writing 8 of the 11 tracks, playing piano and oboe, as well as arranging and conducting the orchestra.

=== Soft Machine ===
In 1972, Jenkins joined the Canterbury jazz fusion rock band Soft Machine, playing saxophone, oboe and flute along with keyboard instruments. The group played venues including The Proms, Carnegie Hall, and the Newport Jazz Festival. The album Six, on which Jenkins first played with Soft Machine, won the Melody Maker British Jazz Album of the Year award in 1973. Jenkins also won the miscellaneous musical instrument section (as he did the following year). Soft Machine was voted best small group in the Melody Maker jazz poll of 1974. The albums in which Jenkins performed and composed were Six (1973), Seven (1973), Bundles (1975), Softs (1976), Alive & Well: Recorded in Paris (1978) and Land of Cockayne (1981). Jenkins was the group's primary composer on Seven and the subsequent four albums.

After Mike Ratledge left the band in 1976, Soft Machine did not include any of its founding members, but kept recording on a project basis with line-ups revolving around Jenkins and drummer John Marshall. Although Melody Maker had positively reviewed the Soft Machine of 1973 and 1974, Hugh Hopper, involved with the group since replacing bassist Kevin Ayers in 1968, cited Jenkins' "third rate" musical involvement in his own decision to leave the band, and the band of the late 1970s has been described by band member John Etheridge as wasting its potential.

=== Other works ===
Karl Jenkins at the Welsh Government's St David Awards (2015)

In November 1973, Jenkins and Ratledge participated in a live-in-the-studio performance of Mike Oldfield's Tubular Bells for the BBC. It is available on Oldfield's Elements DVD.

== Works ==
Jenkins has created advertising music, twice winning the industry prize in that field. From the 1980s, he developed a relationship with Bartle Bogle Hegarty, starting with composing musics for their Levi's jeans "Russian" series. He composed a classical theme used by De Beers diamond merchants for their television advertising campaign focusing on jewellery worn by people otherwise seen only in silhouette. Jenkins later included this as the title track in a compilation called Diamond Music, and eventually created Palladio, using it as the theme of the first movement. Other arrangements have included advertisements for the Renault Clio.

As a composer, his breakthrough came with the crossover project Adiemus. Jenkins has conducted the Adiemus project in Japan, Germany, Spain, Finland, the Netherlands, and Belgium, as well as London's Royal Albert Hall and Battersea Power Station. The Adiemus: Songs of Sanctuary (1995) album topped the classical album charts. It spawned a series of successors, each revolving around a central theme. In 2014 Jenkins released a tribute song for the 2014 Winter Olympics, performed by his new age music group also called Adiemus.

Jenkins was the first international composer and conductor to conduct the University of Johannesburg Kingsway Choir led by Renette Bouwer, during his visit to South Africa as the choir performed his The Armed Man: A mass for peace together with a 70-piece orchestra. In November 2024, the "Benedictus" from the mass was the subject of the BBC Radio 4 programme Soul Music.

Jenkins' choral work The Peacemakers was first performed in New York City's Carnegie Hall on 16 January 2012. Jenkins conducted from the podium and John H. Briggs, Sr. conducted the Children's Chorus from a seated position. The seventeen-movement piece features extracts from religious texts and works by notable humanitarians. A recording was released on 26 March 2012; it features the London Symphony Orchestra and several choirs, as well as guest vocalists and instrumentalists. Additional concerts in the UK and US took place later in the year.

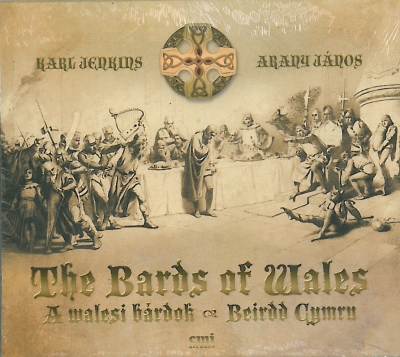
Album cover of The Bards of Wales (2012)

Jenkins composed the music for the 2012 BBC Wales series The Story of Wales presented by Huw Edwards.

A work entitled The Healer – A Cantata For St Luke was premiered on 16 October 2014 at St Luke's Church, Grayshott, Hampshire, and was recorded and broadcast on Classic FM. The Healer received its US premiere at Carnegie Hall, New York on 19 January 2015. In September 2015, the recording of the premiere of The Healer was released on CD by Warner Classics as part of the eight-disc boxed set Voices.

A compilation CD Still with the Music was also released in September 2015, coinciding with the publication of his autobiography of the same name.

On 8 October 2016 Jenkins' choral work Cantata Memoria: For the children, a response to the 1966 Aberfan disaster with a libretto by Mererid Hopwood and commissioned by S4C, premiered at the Wales Millennium Centre. The concert was broadcast the following evening on S4C and was released as an album by Deutsche Grammophon.

== Musical style ==
=== Lyrics ===
Many of the songs written by Jenkins have specifically written phonetic lyrics, but they are not in any language. Instead, they are syllables intended to have a musical effect, but not to carry any specific meaning. This glossolalia is similar to the sounds of "scat singing", except that this latter artform sometimes emphasises of-the-moment improvisation as well.

The composer has said the lyrics to his "Adiemus" series of songs are in "an invented language", and have no particular meaning. He has observed, "The text was written phonetically with the words viewed as instrumental sound, the idea being to maximise the melisma by removing the distraction, if one can call it that, of words”. Some listeners compare his lyrics to the Latin language, but other critics discount such a connection.

Other songs he has written use Biblical or literary texts for the lyrics.

== Awards and honours ==
Jenkins was awarded an honorary doctorate in music by the University of Wales in 2006. He has been made both a fellow (FRAM) and an associate (ARAM) of the Royal Academy of Music in 2003, and a room has been named in his honour. He also has had fellowships at Cardiff University (2005), the Royal Welsh College of Music & Drama, Trinity College Carmarthen and Swansea Metropolitan University. In 2022, he was elected as an Honorary Fellow of the Learned Society of Wales (HonFLSW).

In 2008, Jenkins' The Armed Man was listed as No. 1 in Classic FM's "Top 10 by living composers".

Jenkins has been awarded an honorary doctorate in music by the University of Leicester, the Chancellor's Medal by the University of Glamorgan and honorary visiting professorships at Thames Valley University, London College of Music and the ATriUM, Cardiff.

Jenkins was appointed an Officer of the Order of the British Empire (OBE) in the 2005 New Year Honours and promoted to Commander of the same Order (CBE) in the 2010 Birthday Honours, in both cases for services to music. In the 2015 Birthday Honours he was made a Knight Bachelor "for services to Composing and Crossing Musical Genres."

Jenkins is joint president of the British Double Reed Society and Patron of the International Schools Choral Music Society (ISCMS).

In 2016, Jenkins received the BASCA Gold Badge Award for his unique contribution to music.

Jenkins' work Tros y Garreg (Welsh for Crossing the Stone) was performed at the coronation of King Charles III in 2023, with Jenkins in attendance.

In 2026, The Armed Man was listed as No. 1 in the Classic FM Hall of Fame, the first time a living composer has featured in the top spot.

== Discography ==
=== With Graham Collier ===
The Graham Collier Septet

- Deep Dark Blue Center (1967) – Jenkins: Baritone saxophone. With John Marshall on drums, future Soft Machine

The Graham Collier Sextet

- Down Another Road (1969) Piano, oboe. Jenkins composed Lullaby For A Lonely Child, John Marshall on drums

Compilations

- Workpoints (2005) – Jenkins, soprano and baritone sax
- Deep Dark Blue Centre / Portraits / The Alternate Mosaics (2008) 2 CD – With Alan Wakeman, John Marshall, Harold Beckett, Kenny Wheeler.
- Relook : Graham Collier 1937–2011: A Memorial 75th Birthday Celebration (2012) With John Marshall, Nick Evans, Gary Burton, Frank Ricotti, Roy Babbington, Kenny Wheeler, Alan Wakeman etc.

=== With Neil Ardley – Don Rendell – Ian Carr ===
- Greek Variations & Other Aegean Exercises (1970) – with Jack Bruce, Jeff Clyne, Roy Babbington, John Marshall, Barbara Thompson, etc.

=== With Tim Rice and Andrew Lloyd Webber ===
- Jesus Christ Superstar – (1970) Starring John Marshall, Ian Gillan, Murray Head, J. Peter Robinson, Chris Spedding, etc.

=== With Nucleus ===
Nucleus

- Elastic Rock (1970) – Chris Spedding on guitar, John Marshall on drums, album cover by Roger Dean.
- We'll Talk About It Later (1971)

Ian Carr with Nucleus

- Solar Plexus (1971)

Compilation

- Direct Hits (1976)
- Elastic Rock / We'll Talk About It Later (1994) 2 CD
- Solar Plexus / Belladonna (2002) 2 CD
- Alleycat / Direct Hits (2004) 2 CD

=== With Elton John ===
- Tumbleweed Connection (1970) – Oboe on "Come Down in Time".

=== With The Chitinous Ensemble ===
- Chitinous (1971) – With Paul Buckmaster, Nucleus, Ian Carr, etc.

=== With Linda Hoyle ===
- Pieces of Me (1971) – Jenkins piano, oboe, arranging and conducting orchestra; Chris Spedding guitars; John Marshall drums, percussion; Jeff Clyne bass.

=== With Barry Guy/The London Jazz Composers' Orchestra ===
- Ode (1972) – Jenkins Oboe and soprano and baritone sax Marc Charig on bugle, Alan Wakeman on tenor and soprano saxes, future Soft Machine and cousin of Rick Wakeman.

=== With Soft Machine ===
Studio albums

- Six (1973) – Jenkins keyboards and horns, Mike Ratledge keyboards, Hugh Hopper bass guitar, John Marshall drums
- Seven (1973) – Same except Roy Babbington replaced Hopper on bass.
- Bundles (1975) – Allan Holdsworth added on guitar. Last album with Mike Ratledge.
- Softs (1976) – John Etheridge replaced Holdsworth and Alan Wakeman added on saxes. Jenkins only plays keyboards from this point.
- Rubber Riff (1976) – Originally an album for libraries providing "modern rock music featuring keyboards and guitar" composed by Karl Jenkins. As well as Jenkins some other then-current Soft Machine members played on the album. Reissued as in 1994 under the "Soft Machine" name.
- Land of Cockayne (1981) – Last Soft Machine album with Jenkins: Jenkins keyboards, John Taylor electric piano Fender Rhodes, Allan Holdsworth and Alan Parker guitars, Jack Bruce bass guitar, Ray Warleigh sax and flute, Dick Morrissey tenor sax, John Marshall drums.

Live albums

- Alive & Well: Recorded in Paris (1978) – Jenkins keyboards, John Etheridge guitar, Steve Cook bass guitar, John Marshall drums, Rick Sanders violin.
- BBC Radio 1971 – 1974 (2003)
- British Tour '75 (2005)
- Floating World Live (2006) – Recorded in 1975.
- NDR Jazz Workshop (2010) CD + DVD – Recorded in 1973
- Switzerland 1974 (2015) CD + DVD

Compilations

- Triple Echo (1977) – Available on vinyl on a triple album. Jenkins on the last 4 pieces
- The Untouchable (1990)
- As If... (1991) – Contains songs from the Third , Fourth , Fifth & Sixth albums.
- Softs / Alive And Well (Recorded In Paris) / Bundles (1992) – 3 CDs
- The Best Of Soft Machine – The Harvest Years (1995)
- De Wolfe Sessions (2002) – Presented as Karl Jenkins' Soft Machine.
- MP3 Collection (2003) – Contains albums Volume One (The Soft Machine) to Rubber Riff + At the beginning
- Six + Seven (2004) – 2 CDs
- Out-Bloody-Rageous An Anthology 1967–1973 (2005) – 2 CDs
- Tales Of Taliesin (The EMI Years Anthology 1975–1981) (2010) – 2 CDs
- Original Album Classics (2010) – Contains albums from Third to Seven.

=== With Mike Oldfield ===
- Tubular Bells – BBC 1973 – Recorded live in studio for the BBC in November 1973 and released in 1993. Available on DVD Elements – The Best of Mike Oldfield.
- Music of the spheres (2008) – Jenkins; orchestrations, string direction and production.

=== With Planet Earth ===
- Planet Earth – Avec Mike Ratledge, Tristan Fry, etc. (1978)

=== With Plaza ===
- Plaza – With Mike Thorne and Mike Ratledge. (1979)

=== With Rollercoaster ===
- Wonderin' – With Mike Ratledge, Dick Morrisey, Ray Warleigh, etc. (1980)

=== With Mike Ratledge ===
- Cuts For Commercials Volume 3 (1981)
- For Christmas, For Children (1981)
- Movement (2010)
- Some Shufflin' (2010)

=== With JAR ===
- Only You/Ballad From An Unmade Movie – Single from The Projet Jenkins Aspery Ratledge, JAR (1988)

=== With Kiri Te Kanawa ===
- Kiri Sings Karl (2006) – Jenkins orchestration and production

=== Adiemus ===
Studio albums

- Adiemus: Songs of Sanctuary (1995) – With Mike Ratledge on drums programming and production
- Adiemus II: Cantata Mundi (1997)
- Adiemus III: Dances of Time (1998)
- Adiemus IV: The Eternal Knot (2001)
- Adiemus Live (2001)
- Adiemus V: Vocalise (2003)
- Adiemus Colores (2013)
- Symphonic Adiemus (2017)

=== Compilations ===
- Diamond Music (1996) – Jenkins/The London Philharmonic/The Smith Quartet
- The Best Of Adiemus – The Journey (1999)
- The Essential Collection (2006)
- The Very Best of Karl Jenkins (2011) – 2 CDs
- Adiemus The Collection (2013) – Coffret 6 CDs
- Still With The Music (The Album) (2015)
- Voices – 8-CD boxset including the premiere of The Healer – A Cantata for St Luke. (2015)
- The Very Best of Karl Jenkins (2019)
- The Very Best Of Karl Jenkins (80th Birthday Edition) (2024)

=== Film score ===
- River Queen – Original Motion Picture Soundtrack (2007)

=== Other works ===
- Nomination (1976) – Jenkins/Peter Milray
- Topsy Turvy (1986) – Jenkins/Jack Trombey
- Merry Christmas to the World (1995) – Collection of traditional Christmas carols orchestrated by Jenkins (In Adiemus Style)
- Palladio (1996)
- Eloise (1997) – Opéra
- Imagined Oceans (1998)
- New Music from Karl Jenkins (1998) – Sampler
- Harmonia – Le Chant des rêves (1998) – Compilation with Mike Oldfield and Vangelis
- Dewi Sant (1999)
- The Armed Man: A Mass for Peace (1999)
- Over the Stone (2002) – Concerto for two harps
- Crossing the Stone (2003)
- Ave Verum (2004)
- Quirk (2004)
- La Folia (2004)
- In These Stones Horizons Sing (2004)
- Requiem (2005)
- River Queen (2005) – original film score River Queen by New Zealand director Vincent Ward
- Tlep (2006)
- This Land of Ours (2007) – with Cory Band and Cantorion
- Sarikiz (2008)
- Stabat Mater (2008)
- Quirk – The Concertos (2008) – This album is a compilation of concertos by the composer that were previously commercially unavailable. These are: "Over the Stone" (2002), La Folia (2004), Quirk (2004) and also includes new concerto "Sarikiz" (2008).
- Stella Natalis (2009)
- Gloria / Te Deum (2010) – with Hayley Westenra
- The Bards of Wales (2011)
- Motets (2014)
- Cantata Memoria (2016) – in tribute to the victims (116 children and 28 adults) of the Aberfan disaster, on 21 October 1966
- Songs Of Mercy And Redemption (2019)
- Piano (2019)
- One World (2021–2022)
- Stravaganza (2024) – with Jess Gillam and the Royal Philharmonic Orchestra
- Fragile Earth (2024) — for the National Youth Brass Band of Great Britain

== See also ==
- List of ambient music artists
