= 1980s in Latin music =

- 1970s ^{.} 1980s in Latin music ^{.} 1990s

For Latin music from a year between 1982 and 1989, go to 82 |83 |84 |85 | 85 | 86 | 87 | 88 | 89

This article includes an overview of the major events and trends in Latin music in the 1980s, namely in Ibero-America (including Spain and Portugal). This includes recordings, festivals, award ceremonies, births and deaths of Latin music artists, and the rise and fall of various subgenres in Latin music from 1980 to 1989.

== Charts ==
- List of number-one Billboard Top Latin Songs from the 1980s
- List of number-one Billboard Latin Pop Albums from the 1980s
- List of number-one Billboard Regional Mexican Albums from the 1980s
- List of number-one Billboard Tropical Albums from the 1980s

== Overview ==
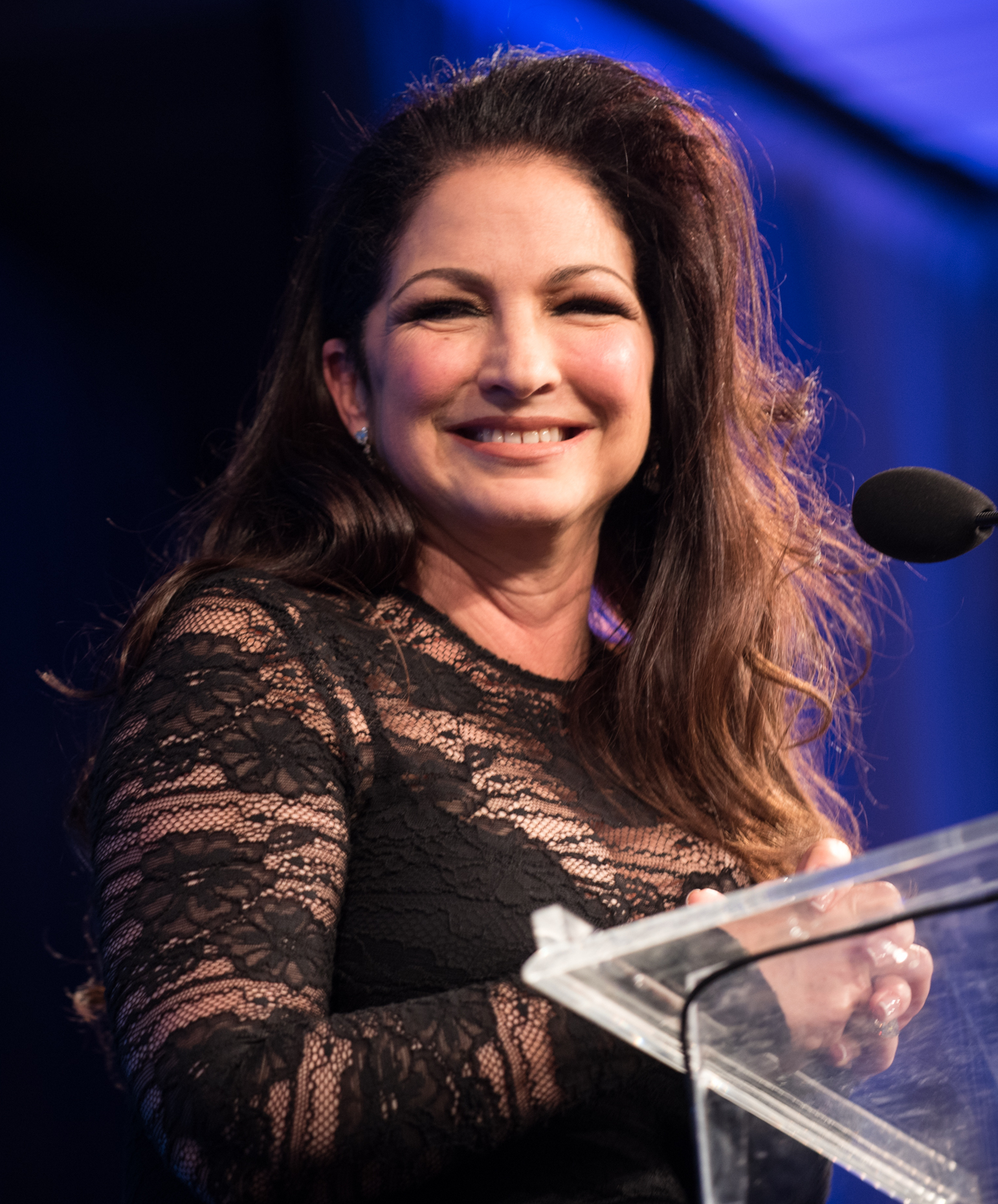
Gloria Estefan, lead singer of the Miami Sound Machine, had a major hit with "Conga".

The 1980s saw the major record labels such as RCA/Ariola, CBS, and EMI form their own Latin music divisions. By 1985, Billboard noted that the Latin music industry saw increase in awareness from major corporations such as Coca-Cola promoting Julio Iglesias and Pepsi advertising Menudo.

=== Latin pop ===
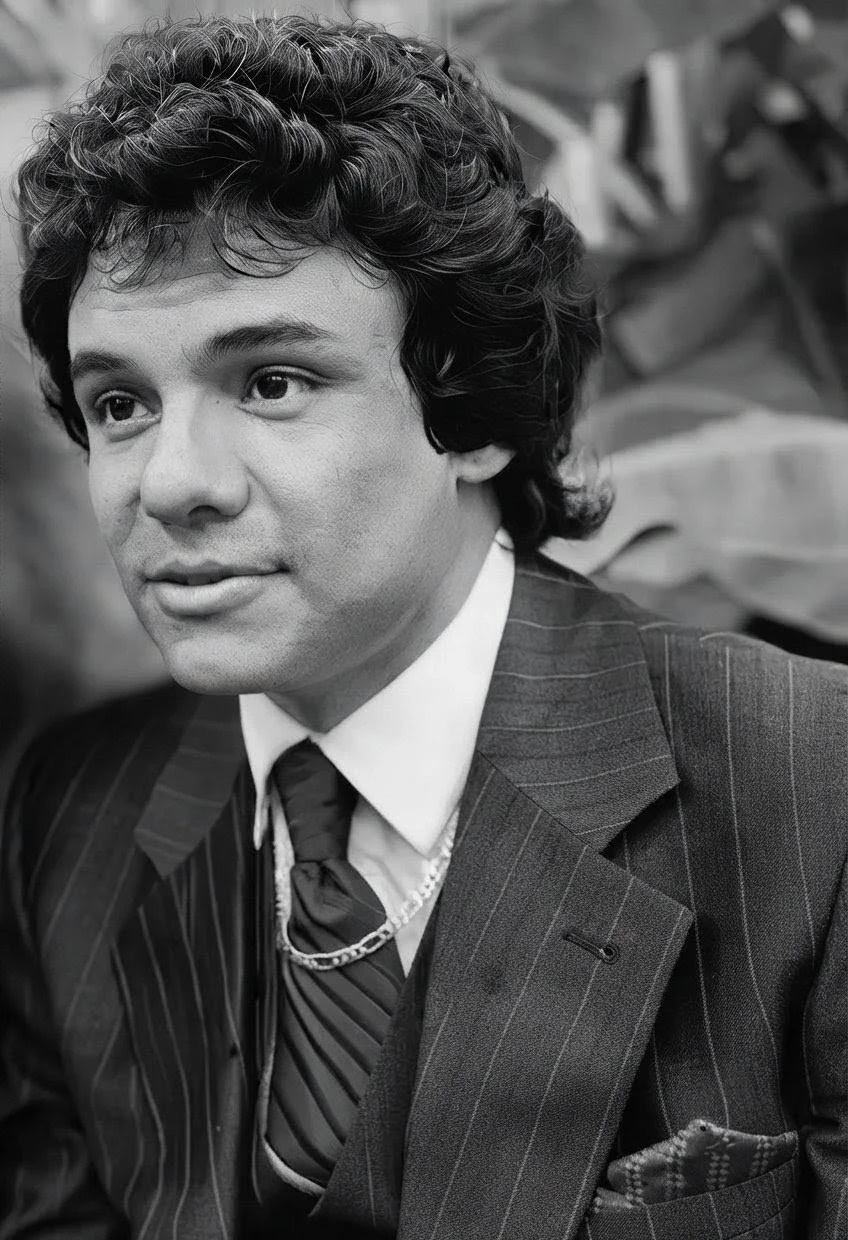
Mexican singer José José was named "Top Latin Pop Artist" by Billboard for three consecutive years (1986–1988) for having sold the most Latin pop albums in the United States.

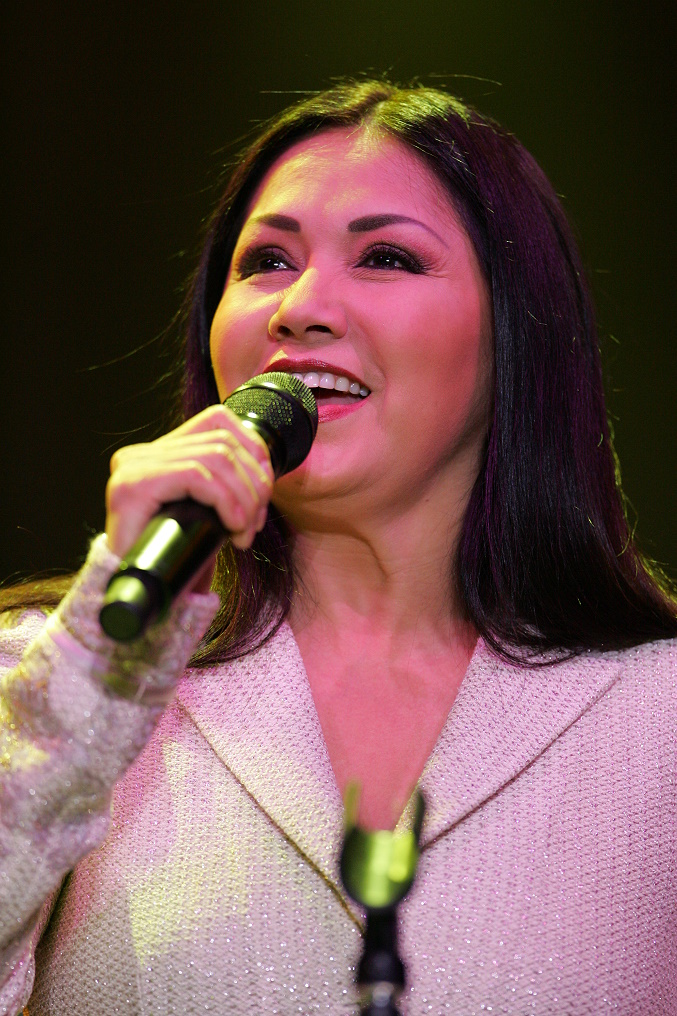
"Ay Amor" by Mexican singer Ana Gabriel (right) was the best-performing Latin song of 1988. It also spent 14 weeks on top of the Billboard Hot Latin Tracks chart.

The romantic balada, which gained popularity in the 1970s, continued to dominate the Latin music charts in the 1980s. Veteran balladeers who continued to be popular in this decade include Julio Iglesias, José José, Roberto Carlos, and Juan Gabriel. The Latin balada is characterized by its bolero origin by fusing music from the United States with pop, R&B, and rock. The 1980s was a golden era for the Venezuelan entertainment industry as popular telenovelas from the country also led to several actors to become successful singers such as Carlos Mata and Guillermo Dávila. Theme songs from telenovelas also became popular on radio airwaves in Venezuela. Female balada singers that became topped the Latin music charts includes Ana Gabriel, Daniela Romo, Rocío Dúrcal, Gloria Estefan, and Marisela. Notably, several baladas were Spanish-language covers of songs originally performed in Italian. Notable Spanish-language covers of Italian songs include "La maldita primavera" by Yuri, "Toda la Vida" by Emmanuel and Franco, "Yo No Te Pido la Luna" by Daniela Romo, and "Tan Enamorados" by Ricardo Montaner.

Aside from the baladas, several Latin pop artists and bands performed variety of Spanish-language pop and dance music targeted to the younger audience. These include Yuri, Marisela, Mecano, Miguel Bosé, Timbiriche, Menudo, and Flans. "Que Te Pasa" became the longest-running chart of the 1980s, spending 16 weeks on top of the Billboard Hot Latin Tracks chart. Juan Gabriel and Rocío Dúrcal collaborated with Chuck Anderson to incorporate mariachi arrangements on their ballads. Child pop singers such as Pablito Ruiz, Luis Miguel, Pedrito Fernández, and Lucerito had a prepubescent following. The Miami Sound Machine, whose vocals were led by Gloria Estefan, gained international fame in 1985 with their crossover hit song "Conga". The song blends both pop music and Latin music from the Caribbean.

=== Regional Mexican ===
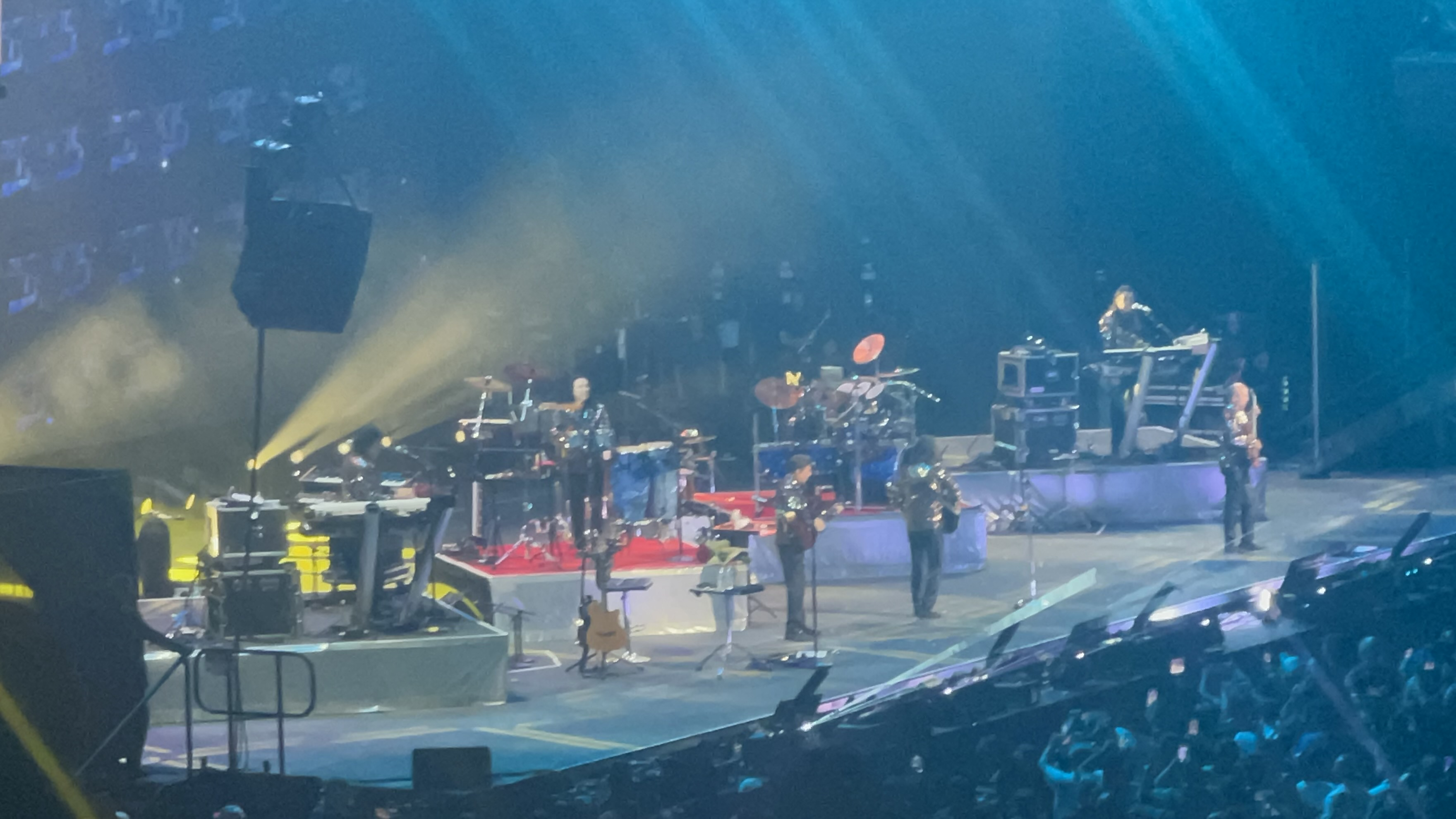
Los Bukis had the best-selling Regional Mexican albums in the United States for consecutive years (1986–1988).

La Mafia (lead singer Oscar De La Rosa pictured) was one of the leading Tejano bands that helped pushed the genre's popularity beyond Texas in the 1980s.

In the 1980s, the regional music scene in both Mexico and the Mexican American community in the United States was dominated by grupera. This style of Mexican music combines cumbia, norteño, and rock music. The lyrics are rooted with romantic themes including heartbroken songs. Several notable grupera ensembles include Los Caminantes, Los Yonic's, Los Bukis, and Los Temerarios. Norteño band Los Tigres del Norte continued their success from the 1970s with their corridos involving social commentary such as "Jaula de oro" ("The Golden Cage") which tells of a Mexican man who crosses the Mexico-United States border illegally and raises a family in the United States who denies their Mexican heritage while the man longs to return to his country. Its parent album reached number one on the Regional Mexican charts in the United States. Similarly, Mexican singer-songwriter Joan Sebastian incorporated sounds of rancheras and ballads on his songs and was dubbed "El Rey del Jaripeo" ("The King of Mexican Rodeo").

Tejano music was also popular to the Mexican Americans living in the United States mainly in Texas. Its style is characterized by its influences from polka, cumbia, bolero, and ranchera as well as pop, rap, country music and reggae. Tejano bands such as Mazz, La Mafia, and Little Joe and La Familia pushed Tejano's popularity beyond the United States. Ranchera Vicente Fernández still remain relevant in the 1980s. His album, Por Tu Maldito Amor (1989), became the longest running number one Regional Mexican album of the decade in the United States with 21 weeks consecutive weeks at this position. American singer Linda Ronstadt, who is of Mexican descent, released Canciones de Mi Padre, a collection of songs that her father would sing. The album was certified double platinum by the RIAA for shipping over two million copies in the United States.

=== Tropical/salsa ===
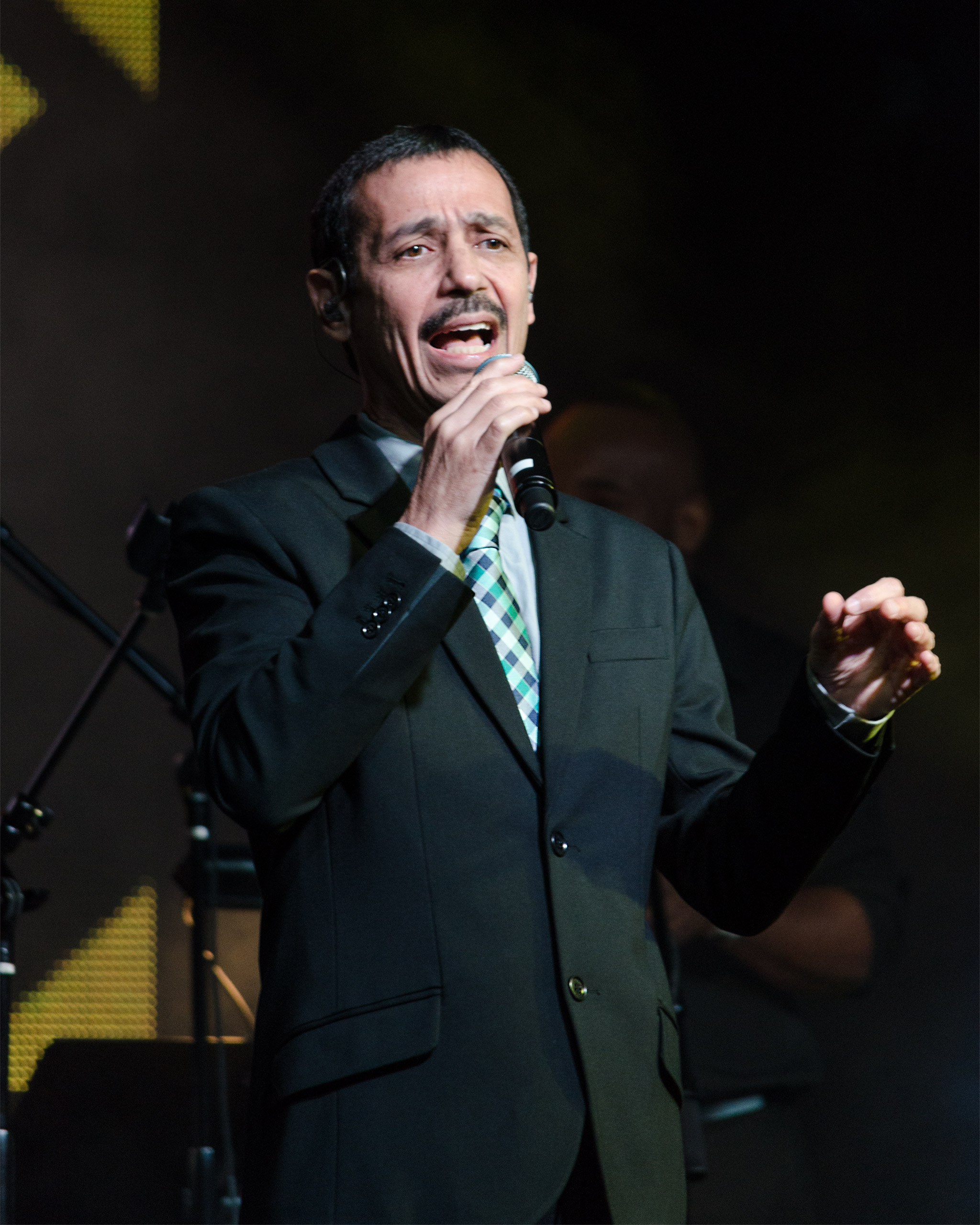
Puerto Rican singer Eddie Santiago, considered to be one of the salsa romántica pioneers had the bestselling Tropical Albums in the United States for three consecutive years (1987–1989). His cover of "Lluvia" was also the highest-peaking salsa song in the 1980s on the Billboard Hot Latin Tracks chart.

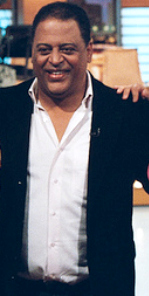
Dominican Republic bandleader Wilfrido Vargas was credited for bringing merengue music to a younger audience and helped expand the genre's popularity outside of its native country.

The New York salsa, which was popularized Fania Records in the 1970s, saw a major decline in the scene. Merengue music from the Dominican Republic became favored by Latinos living in New York City. Wilfrido Vargas was credited for bringing merengue attention to the younger audience. Merengue music also became popular even in Puerto Rico. Another factor to merengue's popularity in the dance clubs was that it was easier to dance to compared to salsa. Milly Quezada, lead vocals of the group Milly y los Vecinos, became the first notable female merengue singer. The group was formed by her husband Rafael Vasquez, who was also her manager. Other notable merengue acts in the 1980s include Bonny Cepeda, Fernando Villalona, Juan Luis Guerra & 4.40 and Los Hijos del Rey. Vargas also formed the first all-female band Las Chicas del Can. Juan Luis Guerra performed not only love songs, but also social commentary about the poverty in the Dominican Republic and those living abroad such as "Visa Para un Sueño" ("Visa For a Dream") and "Ojala Que Llueva Café" ("I Hope It Rains Coffee").

Although New York salsa faded in popularity, another form of salsa music gained attention in its place. This form of salsa, which was slower-placed and more focused on its romantic lyrics, was known as salsa romántica. The salsa romántica movement helped salsa continued to be relevant in spite of the rise of merengue music as well as moving away from lyrics dealing with social class. Salsa romántica was characterized by its influence by the aforementioned romantic ballads and more pop-leaning sounds. In fact, several famous songs done by salsa romántica singers were covers of songs originally sung by balada musicians. "Lluvia", a song first composed by Luis Ángel, was covered by Eddie Santiago and became on the highest-peaking salsa romántica on the Hot Latin Tracks at number four. A sub-style of salsa romántica also included erotic lyrics and became known as salsa erotica. "Ven Devórame Otra Vez" by Lalo Rodríguez, a notable salsa erotica song, became a top ten hit on the Hot Latin Tracks chart. Other famous salsa romantica singers include Frankie Ruiz, Luis Enrique, Willie Gonzalez, David Pabón, and José Alberto "El Canario". In the early 1980s, Cuban musician and bandleader Roberto Torres had a major hit with his cover version of "Caballo Viejo". The song was performed as a charanga vallenata style, a combination of the Cuban charanga and the Colombian vallenato music. It was later inducted into the Latin Grammy Hall of Fame in 2007.

=== Rock en español ===
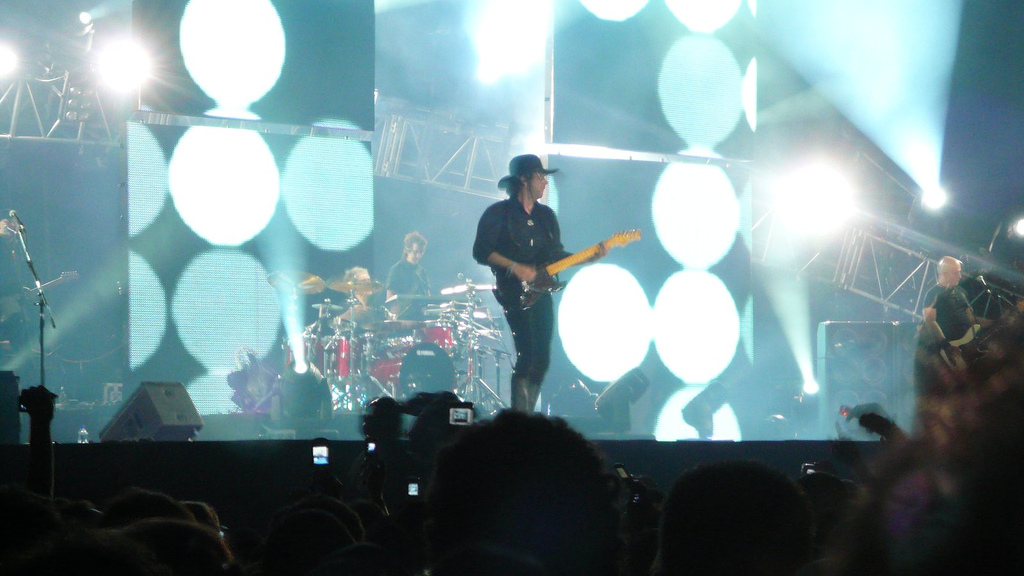
Soda Stereo's Signos was ranked on the list of "The 100 Greatest Albums of National Rock"..

The Rock en Español movement began around the 1980s. Until the mid-80s the rock scene of most Spanish American countries was not connected, and it was rare for a rock band to gain acclaim and popularity outside its home country. Argentina, which had the largest national rock scene and music industry, became the birthplace of several influential rock acts. Soda Stereo from Buenos Aires is often acclaimed as the most influential rock band of the 1980s alongside the solo careers of Charly García, Luis Alberto Spinetta and the new star Fito Páez from Rosario. Soda Stereo was among the first bands to successfully tour across most of Latin America. Argentina developed also during the 80s a ska rock and punk rock scene. The punk movement, which was pioneered by Los Violadores, led to the rise of the Buenos Aires Hardcore around 1990. Soda Stereo released Signos in 1986 which helped pop rock en español music reach to an audience beyond Argentina. In Chile, which was ruled by a military dictatorship all over the 80s, Nueva canción protest songs from the 60s and 70s maintained their popularity despite severe censorship. The progressive/folk-rock band Los Jaivas made a Latin American trademark album with Alturas de Macchu Picchu [sic] based on Pablo Neruda's homonymous poem. The rock band Los Prisioneros were successful in combining the protest song atmosphere of the 80s with newer trends in rock including punk, ska, new wave and techno. In the late 1980s, new bands such as Los Tres and La Ley would start to set the trends for the next decade. In Mexico, the Rock music scene at the time first saw a heavy lack of opportunity as musical acts could not make a solid living from playing alone. Other key factors were that of economic and political instability. Many consider this decade as the lost decade. The government would not allow racy-themed content on television and airwaves, music festivals were not allowed. The music that dominated Mexico and much of Latin America during this era was mostly teen-flavored acts like Menudo, Timbiriche, Flans and others. Rock acts could not land any recording deals because record label executives were much more interested in selling listeners a colourful, hip, and trendy image to the general public ranging from youngsters to middle-aged adults.

=== Folk/traditional ===
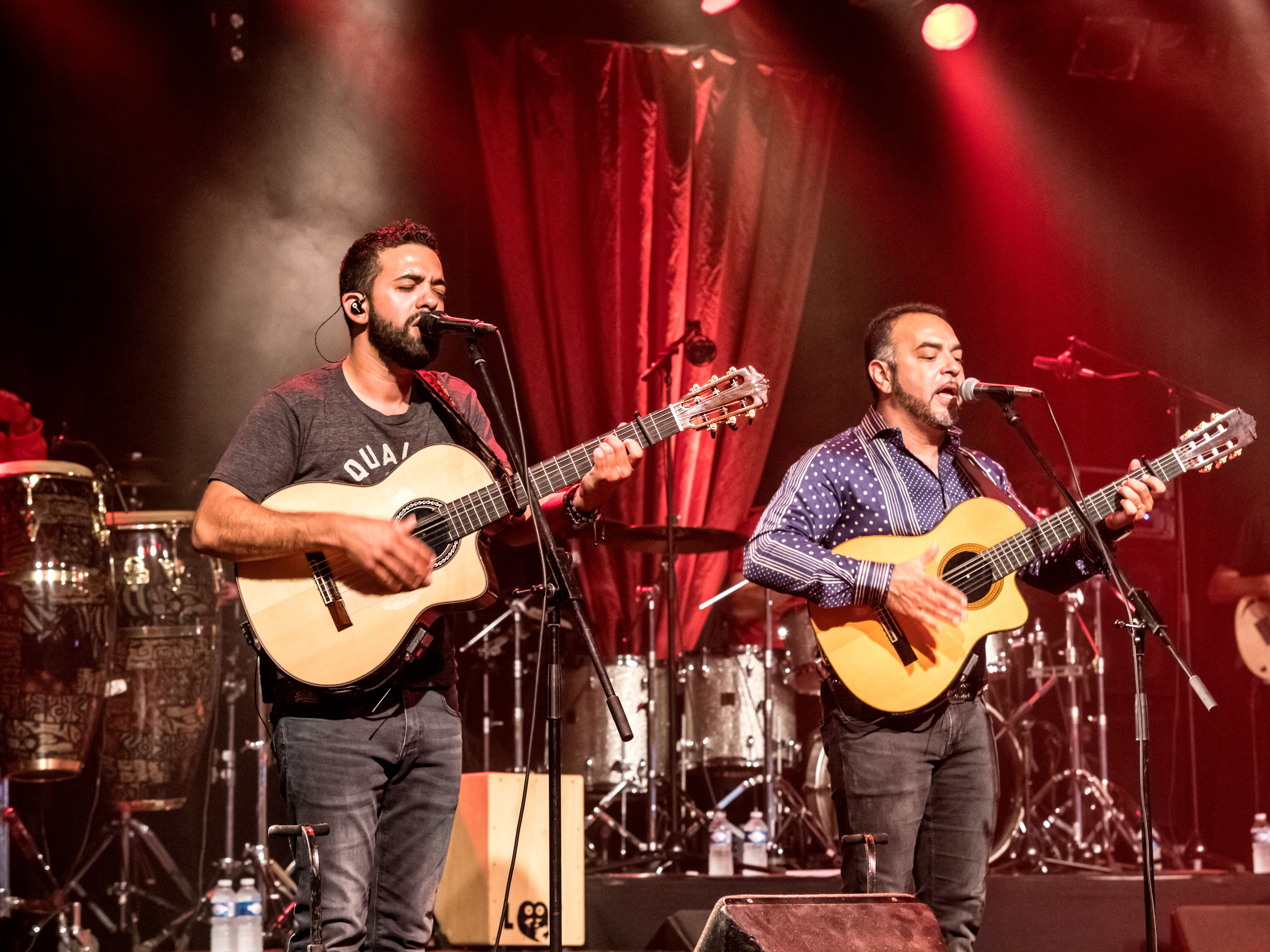
The Gipsy Kings popularized the flamenco genre outside of its native Spain.

Flamenco saw a resurgence in popularity thanks to the Gipsy Kings as well as Ketama and Pata Negra.

=== Brazilian/Portuguese ===
The lambada dance craze took over the international market thanks to Kaoma's song of the same name.

== 1980 ==
=== Events ===
- February 27: Irakere wins the Grammy Award for Best Latin Recording at the 22nd Annual Grammy Awards for their self-titled album.
- November 15 – The 9th OTI Festival, held at the Teatro General San Martín in Buenos Aires, Argentina, is won by the song "Contigo mujer", written by Ednita Nazario and Laureano Brizuela, and performed by Rafael José representing Puerto Rico.

=== Notable singles ===
- Rita Lee: "Lança Perfume" (#1 in France, #2 in Argentina, #3 in Brazil and Uruguay)
- Iván: "Sin Amor" (#1 in Spain)
- Pecos: "Háblame de Tí" (#1 in Spain)
- Francis Cabrel: "La quiero a morir" (#1 in Spain)
- Julio Iglesias: "Hey!" (#1 in Argentina, #1 in Spain)
- Miguel Bosé: "Morir de amor" (#1 in Spain)
- Miguel Bosé: "Don Diablo" (#1 in Spain)
- Mario Milito: "Este es Mi Regalo" (#1 in Argentina)
- Toto Cutugno: "Sólo tú, sólo yo"
- Ángela Carrasco: "Quiereme" (#1 in Argentina)

=== Album releases ===
- Cal Tjader: Gozame! Pero Ya...
- Cal Tjader Sextet: La Onda Va Bien
- Irakere: Irakere 2
- Julio Iglesias: Hey!
- Tito Puente: Dancemania 80's
- Roberto Torres y su Charanga Vallenata: Vol. II
- Peret: El Jilguero
- Miguel Ríos: Rocanrol bumerang
- Parchís: Villancicos
- Rodolfo Aicardi: El De Siempre
- Roberto Carlos: Roberto Carlos '80/Amante a la Antigua
- Los Yonic's: En Su Punto
- María Martha Serra Lima: Entre Nosotros
- Lalo Rodríguez: Simplemente... Lalo
- Cheo Feliciano: Sentimiento, Tú
- Héctor Lavoe: El Sabio
- Ray Barretto: Giant Force
- Angélica María: Y el Sentir de Juan Gabriel
- Emmanuel: Íntimamente
- Miguel Bosé: Miguel
- José Luis Rodríguez: Me vas a echar de menos
- Dyango: La Radio
- José José: Amor Amor
- José José: Romántico
- José Luis Rodríguez: Atrevete
- Lupita D'Alessio: Lupita D'Alessio (1980)
- José María Napoleón: Celos
- Andy Montañez: Salsa Con Cache
- El Gran Combo de Puerto Rico: Unity
- Héctor Casanova Casanova
- Camilo Sesto: Amaneciendo
- Lissette: Lissette
- Alberto Cortez: Castillos en el Aire
- Vikki Carr: Y El Amor: Canta en Español
- Yuri: Esperanzas
- Hernaldo Zúñiga: Hernaldo
- Los Bravos del Norte de Ramón Ayala: Cuando Mas Necesite de Tu Cariño
- La India de Oriente: La India de Oriente
- Oscar D'León: Al Frente de Todos
- Fania All Stars: California Jam
- Ray Conniff: Exclusivamente Latino
- Juan Gabriel: Recuerdos
- Juan Gabriel: Juan Gabriel con Mariachi
- Manoella Torres: Ahora No
- Tania: Indiscutible
- Miguel Gallardo: Sígueme
- Estela Núñez: Demasiado Amor — Canta a Juan Gabriel
- Los Humildes: Mas de Lo Que Merecias
- Los Cadetes de Linares: El Chubasco
- Lorenzo De Monteclaro: Abrazado de un Poste
- Beatriz Adriana: México y Su Música
- Celia Cruz, Johnny Pacheco and Pete "El Conde" Rodríguez: Celia, Johnny, Pete
- Willie Rosario: El De a 20 de Willie
- Wilfrido Vargas: El Jeque
- Johanna Rosaly: Sencillamente
- Roberto Roena: Looking Out For Numero Uno
- Roberto Roena: Que Suerte He Tenido de Nacer
- Paquito Guzmán: Dedicado a...Esa Mujer
- Johnny Pacheco, José Fajardo, Pupi Legarreta, and Javier Vazquez: Las Tres Flautas
- Adalberto Santiago: Feliz Me Siento
- Mazz: Class
- Rocío Dúrcal: Canta con Mariachi Volumen 4
- Milly y Los Vecinos: En Su Momento
- Johnny Ventura: Yo Soy el Merengue
- Santiago Cerón: Tumbando Puertas
- Tito Rojas: Tito Rojas & El Conjunto Borincano
- Betty Missiego: Mi Tierra
- Rubén Blades: Maestra Vida
- Rigo Tovar & su Costa Azul: Rigo Tovar En Vivo
- Basilio: Basilio (1980)
- Rafael José: Contigo Mujer
- Yolandita Monge: Fantasía
- Los Muecas: Los Muecas
- Lupita D'Alessio: En Concierto
- Little Joe: King Of The Brown Sound
- Gualberto Castro: Que Mal Amada Estas
- Aniceto Molina: Cabaretera
- ABBA: Gracias Por La Música
- Louie Ramirez: Salsero
- Raphael: Y... Sigo Mi Camino
- Los Bravos del Norte de Ramón Ayala: Pistoleros Famosos
- Los Bravos del Norte de Ramón Ayala: Más Música Brava
- Los Solitario: Mi Amor
- Henry Fiol: Fe, Esperanza y Caridad
- Raffaella Carrà: Latino
- Bonny Cepeda: El Maestro
- Joan Sebastian: Joan Sebastian (1980)
- Tony Croatto: Tradición
- Los Tigres Del Norte: En La Plaza Garibaldi
- Willie Colón and Ismael Miranda: Doble Energía
- Oscar D'León: Presenta La Critica Con Wladimir Y Teo
- Fania All Stars: Commitment
- Agustín Ramírez: Necesito Tu Amor
- Pedrito Fernández: La Mugrosita
- Beatriz Adriana: Adios y Bienvenida
- La India de Oriente: ¡Desde El Cobre Con Amor!
- Johnny Pacheco: Champ
- Verónica Castro: Norteño
- Los Cadetes de Linares: Pelicula Pistoleros
- Los Pasteles Verdes: Solitario
- Marvin Santiago: Caliente y Explosivo!
- Orchestra Harlow: El Dulce Aroma del Exito
- Rafael Cortijo: El Sueño del Maestro
- Daniel Santos: 50
- Vicente Fernández: El Tapatio
- Los Huracanes del Norte: El Hijo de la Musiquera
- Ismael Rivera: Maelo
- Alfredo "Chocolate" Armenteros: Monsieur Chocolate Prefiero El Son
- Willy Chirino: Diferente
- La Pequeña Compañía: Boleros y Cha Cha Chas
- Roberto Pulido & Los Clasicos: Mi Pequeñito
- Rigo Tovar: Con Mariachi Vol. 2
- La Sonora Ponceña: New Heights
- La Lupe: En Algo Nuevo
- Claudia de Colombia: Yo creo en ti
- Arrigo Barnabé: Clara Crocodilo
- Itamar Assumpção and Banda Isca de Polícia: Beleléu, Leléu, Eu
- Egberto Gismonti: Circense
- Joan Manuel Serrat: En tránsito
- La Sonora Ponceña: Unchained Force
- Rodolfo Aicardi: Qué chévere Volumen 2
- Orquesta Filarmónica de México: 4 compositores mexicanos
- Leo Maslíah: Cansiones barias
- Rita Lee: Rita Lee
- Joyce: Feminina
- Toninho Horta e Orquestra Fantasma: Terra dos Pássaros
- Cauby Peixoto: Cauby! Cauby!
- Djavan: Alumbramento
- Gonzaguinha: De Volta ao Começo
- Fundo de Quintal: Samba É no Fundo de Quintal
- Vinicius de Moraes: A Arca de Noé
- Clara Nunes: Brasil Mestiço
- Elis Regina: Saudade do Brasil
- Rigo Tovar: Rock Rigo

=== Deaths ===
- May 27 – Belmácio Pousa Godinho, Brazilian football player and musician

=== Births ===
- May 12 – Silvestre Dangond, Colombian vallenato singer
- August 29 – Flex, Panamanian reggaeton singer
- November 14 – Pedro Capó, Puerto Rican pop singer

== 1981 ==
=== Events ===
- February 25: Cal Tjader wins the Grammy Award for Best Latin Recording at the 23rd Annual Grammy Awards for La Onda Va Bien.
- December 5 – The 10th OTI Festival, held at the National Auditorium in Mexico City, Mexico, is won by the song "Latino", written by Pablo Herrero and José Luis Armenteros, and performed by Francisco representing Spain.

=== Notable singles ===
- Camilo Sesto: "Perdóname" (#1 in Spain)
- Ana Belén: "Que será" (#1 in Spain)
- Iván: "Te Quiero Tanto" (#1 in Spain)
- José Luis Perales: "Te Quiero" (#1 in Spain)
- Víctor Manuel: "Ay Amor" (#1 in Spain)
- Julio Iglesias: "De niña a mujer" (#1 in Spain)
- Lucrecia: "Papucho Mío" (#1 in Argentina)
- Franco Simone: "Tu Para Mi" (#1 in Argentina)
- Pimpinela: "Tú Me Promiste Volver"
- Jeanette: "Frente a Frente" (#1 in Argentina)
- Menudo: "Súbete a mi Moto"

=== Album releases ===
- Ray Barretto: Soy Dichoso
- Willie Colón and Rubén Blades: Canciones Del Solar De Los Aburridos
- Clare Fischer and Salsa Picante: 2+2
- Dizzy Gillespie with Mongo Santamaría and Toots Thielemans: Summertime Digital at Montreaux, 1980
- Eddie Palmieri: Eddie Palmieri
- Laurindo Almeida and Charlie Byrd: Brazilian Soul
- Raphael: En Carne Viva
- Miami Sound Machine: Otra Vez
- Little Joe: Mano a Mano
- Sabú: Sabú
- Los Bukis: Presiento Que Voy a Llorar
- Jeanette: Corazón de poeta
- José José: Gracias
- Yuri: Llena de dulzura
- Rocío Jurado: Como una ola
- Rocío Jurado: Canciones de España
- Camilo Sesto: Más y más
- Beatriz Adriana: La Reina es el Rey
- Roberto Carlos: Roberto Carlos '81/Emociones
- Menudo: Fuego
- Menudo: Quiero Ser
- Andy Montañez: Trovador del Amor
- Andy Montañez: Para Ustedes...Con Sabor!
- Bacchelli Prohibido
- Luis Ángel: Yo Mismo
- Vicente Fernández: El Número Uno
- Vicente Fernández: Valses del Recuerdo
- Johnny Ventura: Lo Que Te Gusta
- Santiago Cerón: Bueno de Vicio
- Danny Rivera: Gitano
- Vikki Carr: El Retrato de Amor
- Lisandro Meza: Canción para una Muerte Anunciada
- Raphy Leavitt: 10 Aňos Sembrando Semillas en el Alma del Pueblo
- Julio Iglesias: De niña a mujer
- Glenn Monroig: En Concierto
- Joseíto Mateo: Joseito Mateo y Su Pericombo
- Los Bravos del Norte de Ramón Ayala: Amor Vaquero
- Los Bravos del Norte de Ramón Ayala: Dos Monedas
- Manolo Muñoz: Ando Que Me Lleva
- Los Panchos María Martha Serra Lima: Esencia Romantica
- Henry Fiol: El Secreto
- Rocío Dúrcal: Confidencias
- Rocío Dúrcal: Canta a Juan Gabriel Volumen 5
- Milly y los Vecinos: Fiesta Con Los Vecinos
- Los Freddy's: El Primer Tonto
- Plácido Domingo: Plácido Domingo Sings Tangos
- Manolo Galván: Me Llaman el Calavera
- José Mangual Jr: Que lo Diga el Tiempo
- Roberto Angleró: La Trulla Moderna
- Dyango: Entre una espada y la pared
- Denisse de Kalafe: Amar Es
- Iva Zanicchi: Nostalgias
- Paloma San Basilio: Ahora
- Amanda Miguel: El Sonido Vol. 1
- Pecos Kanvas: Tan Adentro de Mi Alma
- Verónica Castro: Cosas de Amigos
- Tito Puente: Ce' Magnifique
- Néstor Torres: No Me Provoques
- Wilfrido Vargas: Cosas de Mi Amigo Miguelito
- Lupita D'Alessio: Lupita D'Alessio (1981)
- Lupita D'Alessio: Sentimiento Ranchero
- Juan Gabriel: Con Tu Amor
- El Gran Combo de Puerto Rico: Happy Days
- Oscar D'León: A Mi Si Me Gusta Asi!
- Bobby Valentin: Siempre En Forma
- La Sonora Ponceña: Night Rider
- La Sonora Ponceña: Unchained Force
- Rubén Blades and Willie Colón: Canciones Del Solar De Los Aburridos
- Grupo Pegasso: Vol. 2
- Roberto Pulido y Los Clasicos: Aquí
- Héctor Lavoe: Que Sentimiento!
- Celia Cruz and Willie Colón:– Celia y Willie
- La Sonora Matancera and Justo Betancourt: La Sonora Matancera con Justo Betancourt
- Wilfrido Vargas and Sandy Reyes: Abusadora
- Johnny Pacheco and Celio González: El Zorro De Plata Presenta Al Flaco De Oro
- Fania All-Stars: Latin Connection
- Galy Galiano: Frío de Ausencia
- Ismael Miranda: La Clave del Sabor
- Luis "Perico" Ortiz: El Astro
- Típica 73: Into The 80's
- Francisco: Latino
- Miguel Bosé: Más Alla
- Orlando Contreras and Daniel Santos: Los Jefes
- Felipe Rodríguez: La Voz
- Willie Rosario: The Portrait of a Salsa Man
- Beatriz Adriana: El Cofrecito
- Ángela Carrasco: Con Amor
- La Pequeña Compañía: Tangos a media luz
- Fania All Stars: The Perfect Blend
- Tony Croatto: Arrímese Mi Compáy
- Los Bravos del Norte de Ramón Ayala: Con Las Puertas en la Cara
- La Mafia: Only in Texas
- Los Tigres Del Norte: Un Día a la Vez
- Lorenzo De Monteclaro: Ese Señor de las Canas
- Pellín Rodríguez: Reflexiones Pasadas
- Juan Pardo: Juan Mucho Más
- Karina: Ahora que estuviste lejos
- Los Humildes: A Mis Amigos del Norte
- Joan Sebastian: Joan Sebastian (1981)
- Rigo Tovar: Rigo 81
- Las Jilguerillas: El Bracero Fracasado
- Santiago Cerón: Canta Si Va' Cantar
- Andy Montañez: La Última Copa
- Willie Colón: Fantasmas
- Marvin Santiago: Adentro
- Johnny Ventura: Johnny Mucho... Mucho Johnny!
- Los Cadetes de Linares: Cazador de Asesinos
- Mocedades: Desde que tú te has ido
- Nelson Ned: Perdidamente Enamorado/Perdidamente Apaixonado
- Bacchelli: Y sólo tú
- Richard Clayderman: Balada para Adelina
- Milly Quezada: No Te Puedo Tener
- Diego Verdaguer: Estoy Vivo
- José María Napoleón: Tú y nadie más
- Cuco Valoy & Los Virtuosos: Sin Comentarios
- Lolita Flores: Seguir Soñando
- Gilberto Monroig: Mi Jaragual
- Roberto Torres: Recuerda al Trio Matamoros
- Yolanda del Río: Yolanda del Río
- Sunny & The Sunliners: El Amante
- Chucho Avellanet: 20 Años en la Canción
- Anthony Ríos: Estás Dónde No Estás
- Little Joe & La Familia: Prieta Linda
- Chico Alvarez: Montuneando
- Leonardo Paniagua: Con Mariachi
- Tony Croatto: Creo en Dios
- Roberto Pulido: Llorando en Mi Tumba
- Salvatore Adamo: Aquellas manos en tu cintura
- José Luis Perales: Nido de águilas
- Los Kjarkas: Canto a la mujer de mi pueblo
- Emma Junaro: Resolana
- Luzmila Carpio: Sumaj llajta
- Los Jaivas: Alturas de Machu Picchu
- Ney Matogrosso: Ney Matogrosso
- Rita Lee & Roberto de Carvalho: Saúde
- Gilberto Gil: Luar (A Gente Precisa Ver o Luar)
- Kleiton & Kledir: Kleiton & Kledir
- Edu Lobo and Antônio Carlos Jobim: Edu & Tom, Tom & Edu
- Dona Ivone Lara: Sorriso Negro
- João Gilberto, Caetano Veloso, Gilberto Gil, Maria Bethânia: Brasil
- Chico Buarque: Almanaque
- Angela Ro Ro: Escândalo!

=== Births ===
- January 15 – Pitbull American rapper
- January 21 – Michel Teló, Brazilian sertanejo singer
- January 29 – Álex Ubago, Spanish pop singer
- March 17 – Nicky Jam, Puerto Rican reggaeton singer
- July 21 – Romeo Santos, American bachata singer-songwriter, member of Aventura
- October 5 – Tito El Bambino, Puerto Rican reggaeton singer
- December 16 – Gaby Moreno, Guatemalan pop singer
- December 29 – Natalia Jiménez, Spanish pop singer
