= 1984 in Latin music =

This is a list of notable events in Latin music (music from the Spanish- and Portuguese-speaking areas of Latin America, Latin Europe, and the United States) that took place in 1984.

== Events ==
- February 28 – The 26th Annual Grammy Awards are held at The Shrine Auditorium in Los Angeles, California.:
  - José Feliciano wins the Grammy Award for Best Latin Pop Performance for Me Enamoré.
  - Los Lobos wins the Grammy Award for Best Mexican/Mexican-American Performance for "Anselma".
  - Tito Puente wins the Grammy Award for Best Tropical Latin Performance for On Broadway.
- November 10 – The 13th OTI Festival, held at the National Auditorium in Mexico City, Mexico, is won by the song "Agualuna", written and performed by Fernando Ubiergo representing Chile.

== Notable singles ==
- José José: "Lo Dudo" (#1 in Mexico)
- Lani Hall and Camilo Sesto: "Corazón encadenado"
- Juan Gabriel: "Querida" (#1 in Mexico)
- La Unión: "Lobo-Hombre en París" (#1 in Spain)
- Tino Casal: "Pánico en El Edén" (#1 in Spain)
- José Luis Perales: "Tentación" (#1 in Spain)
- Miguel Bosé: "Sevilla" (#1 in Spain)
- Alaska y Dinarama: "¿Cómo Pudiste Hacerme Esto a Mí?" (#1 in Spain)

== Album releases ==
- José Luis Perales: Amaneciendo en ti
- José Luis Rodríguez: Voy a Conquistarte
- Juan Gabriel: Recuerdos, Vol. II
- Marisela: Sin él
- Chiquetete: Eres Mía
- Lissette: Caricatura
- José Feliciano: Cómo Tu Quieres
- Nelson Ned: A Mi Nuevo Amor/Ao Meu Novo Amor
- Nelson Ned: Más Romántico Que Nunca
- Beatriz Adriana: Arrepentida y Sola
- Pimpinela: Convidencias
- Miguel Gallardo: Tu Amante o Tu Enemigo
- Lucía Méndez: Sólo Una Mujer
- Rocío Dúrcal: Canta A Juan Gabriel Volumen 6
- Emmanuel: Emmanuel
- José José: Reflexiones
- Los Freddy's: Y Me Enamoré
- Los Invasores de Nuevo León: Cariño
- Víctor Yturbe: Homenaje a los Trios
- Los Bukis: Mi Fantasia
- Joan Sebastian: Rumores
- Grupo Yndio: Adios
- Los Invasores de Nuevo León: Amor a la Ligera
- Los Cadetes de Linares: Despedida Con Mariachi
- Vikki Carr: Simplemente Mujer
- Los Tigres del Norte: La Jaula de Oro
- Milly y los Vecinos: Esta Noche!
- Grupo Niche: No hay quinto malo
- Johnny Ventura: Y Buena Que Esta... Maria
- El Gran Combo de Puerto Rico: In Alaska: Breaking the Ice
- Rubén Blades: Mucho Mejor
- Los Prisioneros: La Voz De Los 80
- Belkis Concepción and Las Chicas Del Can: Belkis Concepción & Las Chicas Del Can
- Ray Barretto: Todo Se Va Poder
- Tommy Olivencia & su Orquesta: Celebrando Otro Aniversario
- Roberto Torres: Corazón de Pueblo
- Luis "Perico" Ortiz: La Vida en Broma
- Wilfrido Vargas: El Jardinero
- María de Lourdes: Mujer Importante
- Santiago Jiménez Jr.: Santiago Strikes Again
- Mongo Santamaría and his Latin Jazz Orchestra: Free Spirit – Espiritu Libre
- María Conchita Alonso: María Conchita
- Johnny Lozada: Invítame
- Menudo: Evolución
- Sheena Easton: Todo Me Recuerda a Ti
- Raphael: Eternamente Tuyo
- Eddie Palmieri: Palo Pa' Rumba
- Poncho Sánchez: Bien Sabroso!
- Rubén Blades: Buscando América
- Willie Colón: Criollo
- Daniela Romo: Amor Prohibido
- Franco De Vita: Franco De Vita
- Guadalupe Pineda: Te Amo
- Danny Rivera: Así Cantaba Cheito González, Vol. 2
- Danny Rivera: En la Intimidad
- Leonardo Paniagua: El Gusto del Pueblo
- Cheo Feliciano: 25 Años de Sentimientos
- Fausto Rey: Mi Linda Música Merengue!
- Los Caminantes: Porque Tengo Tu Amor
- Los Iracundos: Tú Con Él
- Dyango: Al fin solos
- Ramón Ayala y Los Bravos del Norte: Vidrios Rotos
- Ramón Ayala y Los Bravos del Norte: El Corrido del Tuerto
- Ramón Ayala y Los Bravos del Norte: Vestida de Color de Rosa
- Little Joe: Renunciación
- Julio Iglesias: 1100 Bel Air Place
- José María Napoleón: Contra Viento y Marea
- Soda Stereo: Soda Stereo
- Wilkins: La Historia Se Repite
- Guillermo Dávila: Definitivamente
- Los Invasores de Nuevo León: Ya Pa' Qué
- Vicente Fernández: Un Mexicano en la México
- Carmita Jiménez: En Vivo
- Carmita Jiménez: Interpreta a Los Panchos
- Massiel: Sola en Libertad
- La Mafia: Hot Stuff
- Luis Miguel: Ya nunca más
- Luis Miguel: Palabra de honor
- Los Yonic's: Pero No Me Dejes
- Rudy Pérez: Ruby
- Gualberto Ibarreto: Gualberto Ibarreto
- Gualberto Ibarreto: No Juegues con Mi Amor
- Los Humildes: Anoche Soñé
- Israel Kantor: Con La Verdad
- Andy Montañez: Versatil
- Lani Hall: Lani Hall
- Bobby Valentín and Cano Estremera: En Acción
- Amanda Miguel: El Último Sonido, Vol. III
- Roberto Blades and Orquesta Inmensidad: Alegría
- Elio Roca: Bienvenido Sea el Amor
- Lupita D'Alessio: Yo
- Charytín: Se Acabó
- Charytín: Guitarras y Violines
- Los Tigres del Norte: Internacionalmente Norteños
- Dulce: Tu Muñeca
- Manoella Torres: Acéptame Como Soy
- Fania All-Stars: Lo Que Pide la Gente
- Willie Rosario: Nuevos Horizents
- Glenn Monroig: No Finjas
- Cuco Valoy: Cuco Valoy y Su Tribu
- Fernando Villalona: Ayer Y Hoy
- Mazz: It's Bad!
- Willie Colón: Tiempo Pa' Matar
- El Combo de Ayer: 20 Años Después
- Oscar D'León: Con Cariño
- Roberto Carlos: Roberto Carlos' 84/Yo Te Amo
- Miguel Bosé: Bandido
- Mecano: Ya Viene el Sol
- Ana Belén: Geminis
- Joan Manuel Serrat: En Directo
- Alaska y Dinarama: Deseo Carnal
- El Tri: Simplemente
- Enrique Males: Jarishimi Kichuapi
- Botellita de Jerez: Botellita de Jerez
- Rockdrigo González: Hurbanistorias
- La Mona Jiménez: Para toda América
- Jaime Roos: Mediocampo
- Os Paralamas do Sucesso: O Passo do Lui
- Barão Vermelho: Maior Abandonado
- Ratos de Porão: Crucificados pelo Sistema
- Marina Lima: Fullgás
- Kid Abelha: Seu Espião
- Caetano Veloso: Velô
- Gilberto Gil: Raça Humana
- Titãs: Titãs
- Elomar, Geraldo Azevedo, Vital Farias, and Xangai: Cantoria
- Djavan: Lilás
- Rigo Tovar: De Nuevo En Contacto Musical

== Births ==
- August 20 – Carminho, Portuguese fado singer

== Deaths ==
- April 23 – Juan Tizol, Puerto Rican jazz trombonist and composer, 84
- October 31 – Pellin Rodriguez, Puerto Rican salsa singer, 57 (stroke)
