= 1985 in Latin music =

This is a list of notable events in Latin music (music from the Spanish- and Portuguese-speaking areas of Latin America, Latin Europe, and the United States) that took place in 1985.

== Events ==
- February 26 – The 27th Annual Grammy Awards are held at The Shrine Auditorium in Los Angeles, California.:
  - Plácido Domingo wins the Grammy Award for Best Latin Pop Performance for Siempre en Mi Corazón — Always in My Heart.
  - Sheena Easton and Luis Miguel wins the Grammy Award for Best Mexican/Mexican-American Performance for "Me Gustas Tal Como Eres".
  - Eddie Palmieri wins the Grammy Award for Best Tropical Latin Performance for Palo Pa Rumbia.
- June 29 – Billboard debuts three new Latin music albums charts which are divided by genres as opposed to selected locations in the United States. The three Latin music charts established are Latin Pop Albums, Regional Mexican Albums, and Tropical Albums.
- September 21 – The 14th OTI Festival, held at the Teatro Lope de Vega in Seville, Spain, is won by the song "El fandango aquí", written by Marcial Alejandro, and performed by Eugenia León representing Mexico.

== Notable singles ==
- Raphael: "Yo Sigo Siendo Aquel" (US Cashbox: "Most Added")
- Jorge Rigo: "Sola" (US Cashbox: "Most Added")
- Lani Hall and Roberto Carlos: "De Repente el Amor" (US Cashbox: "Most Added")
- Carlos Mata: "¿Que Porque Te Quiero?" (US Cashbox: "Most Added")
- Hermanos (Various artists): "Cantaré, cantarás" (US Cashbox: "Most Added")
- Juan Gabriel: "Querida" (#1 in Mexico)
- Luis Miguel: "Palabra de Honor" (#1 in Mexico)
- Lucía Méndez: "Corazón de piedra" (#1 in Mexico)
- Rocío Dúrcal and Juan Gabriel: "Déjame vivir" (#1 in Mexico)
- Chiquetete: "Esta cobardía" (#1 in Mexico)
- Miguel Bosé: "Amante bandido" (#1 in Spain)
- Alaska y Dinarama: "Ni Tú, Ni Nadie"" (#1 in Spain)
- Iván: "Baila" (#1 in Spain)

== Album releases ==
- [pt] Nordeste Já, a collective release featuring dozens of popular Brazilian performers with the intent of aiding the Brazilian northeast after severe droughts in the region. The release featured two songs: "Chega de Magoa" and "Seca D'Água"; both songs are credited as being written by "collective creation".
- Ángela Carrasco: Dama del Caribe
- Charytín: Verdades Desnudas
- Dyango: Por amor al arte
- Guillermo Dávila: Cantaré Para Ti
- José Feliciano: Ya soy tuyo
- Miguel Gallardo: Corazón viajero
- Julio Iglesias: Libra
- José José: Promesas
- Marisela: Completamente tuya
- Carlos Mata: Qué por qué te quiero
- Miami Sound Machine: Primitive Love
- Yolandita Monge: Luz de Luna
- Ismael Miranda: Una Nueva Visión
- Pimpinela: Lucía y Joaquín
- José Luis Rodríguez: El Último Beso
- Camilo Sesto: Tuyo
- Álvaro Torres: Tres
- Raphael: Yo Sigo Siendo Aquel
- Ramón Ayala y Los Bravos Del Norte: La que se fue tierra mala
- Fito Olivares: El Cometa
- Vicente Fernández: De un Rancho a Otro
- Los Barón de Apodaca: Hoy no hago mas que recordarte
- La Sonora Dinamita: La Cumbia del sida
- Los Tigres del Norte: El Otro México
- La Sombra: Sombra Love
- La Sombra: The Windy City Boys
- Legião Urbana: Legião Urbana
- Ramón Ayala y Los Bravos Del Norte: En Gira Internacional
- Ramón Ayala y Los Bravos Del Norte: Laguna Seca Ranch
- Ramón Ayala y Los Bravos Del Norte: Un rinconcito en el cielo
- Los Baby's: Piensa en Mi
- Los Yonic's: Con Mariachi
- Los Yonic's: Los Yonic's
- Los Invasores de Nuevo León: Me rompieron tu retrato
- La Mafia: Herencia Norteña
- La Mafia: Neon Static
- Los Caminantes: Cada Día Mejor
- Grupo Pegasso: Como una Estrella
- Los Bukis: A Donde Vas
- Jochy Hernández: Ahora Yo
- Cheo Feliciano: Regresa al Amor
- Juan Luis Guera & 4.40: Mudanza y Acarreo
- Willie Chirino: Zarabanda
- Tommy Olivencia & su Orquesta: Ayer, Hoy, Mañana y Siempre
- Tony Croatto: Mi luncha
- Wilfrido Vargas: La Medicina
- Tavín Pumarejo and Conjunto Quisqueya: La Combinación Ganadora
- Johnny Ventura: Navidad Sin Ti
- El Gran Combo de Puerto Rico: Innovations
- El Gran Combo de Puerto Rico: Y Su Pueblo
- Milly y los Vecinos: Dinastia
- Rubén Blades: Escenas
- Bonny Cepeda: Noche de Discoteca
- Cuco Valoy: Mejor Que Nunca
- Frankie Ruiz: Solista pero no solo
- Johnny Ventura: El Hombre y Su Musica
- Fernando Villalona: ¡A la Carga!
- Orquesta La Solucion: Una Canita Más
- Bobby Valentín: Algo Excepcional
- Jossie Esteban y la Patrulla 15: Nuestro 5to Aniversario: El Muchachito
- Alex Bueno: Alex Bueno & Orquesta Liberacion
- Héctor Lavoe: Reventó
- Andy Montañez: Andy Montañez
- Willie Rosario: Afincando
- Isabel Pantoja: Marinero de Luces
- Roberto Carlos: Roberto Carlos '85
- Lani Hall: Es Fácil Amar
- Los Humildes: 13 Aniversario/13 Album/13 Exitos
- Eddie Palmieri: Solito
- Celia Cruz and Johnny Pacheco: De Nuevo
- Yolanda del Río: Un Amor Especial
- Grupo Niche: Triunfo
- Louie Ramirez & Su Orquesta and Ray de la Paz: Alegres y Románticos
- Marvin Santiago: El Sonero del Pueblo
- Lucecita Benítez: Éxitos Callejeros
- Carlos Mata: Marisela
- Mazz: The Bad Boys
- Luis Miguel and Lucerito: Fiebre de amor
- Ultraje a Rigor: Nós Vamos Invadir sua Praia
- Legião Urbana: Legião Urbana
- RPM: Revoluções por Minuto
- Joan Manuel Serrat: El Sur también existe
- Mario Benedetti and Daniel Viglietti: A dos voces
- Fito Páez: Giros
- León Gieco: De Ushuaia a La Quiaca
- Sumo: Divididos por la felicidad
- Virus: Locura
- Ira!: Mudança de Comportamento
- Fellini: O Adeus de Fellini
- Cólera: Tente Mudar o Amanhã
- Itamar Assumpção: Sampa Midnight - Isso Não Vai Ficar Assim
- Kid Abelha: Educação Sentimental
- Nana Caymmi: Chora Brasileira
- Rigo Tovar: El Músico Chiflado

== Births ==
- January 7 – J Balvin, Colombian reggaeton singer
- October 29 – Ximena Sariñana, Mexican singer-songwriter
- December 23 – Arcángel, American reggaeton singer

== Deaths ==
- May 12 – Rodolfo Arízaga, Argentinian composer, 58
- July 9 – Vinicius de Moraes, Brazilian polymath, 66
