= Chico Alvarez =

Chico Alvarez may refer to:

- Alfred "Chico" Alvarez (1920–1992), Canadian trumpeter and session musician with Stan Kenton
- Chico Álvarez (singer) (born Ernesto Álvarez Peraza), American Latin jazz musician
- Bryan Alvarez (born 1975), American newsletter editor and professional wrestler under the name Chico Alvarez
