= 1990s in Latin music =

Major events and trends in Latin music in the 1990s

- 1980s ^{.} 1990s in Latin music ^{.} 2000s

Selena was named Top Latin Artist of the 1990s by Billboard.

This article includes an overview of trends in Latin music in the 1990s, namely in Ibero-America (including Spain and Portugal). This includes the rise and fall of various subgenres in Latin music from 1990 to 1999.

== Overview ==
According to the Recording Industry Association of America (RIAA), Latin music sales grew by almost 25% from 1996 to $490 million in 1997 ($909.818 million in 2022). There were 44.1 million Latin albums shipped in the United States. According to the RIAA, the increase in Latin music during this period is due to major record companies forming joint ventures with specialty indie labels familiar with the market, an increase of Latin artists on major labels providing them greater exposure, as well as an increase in radio stations playing Latin music which provided an expansion in Latin music awareness.

=== Latin pop ===
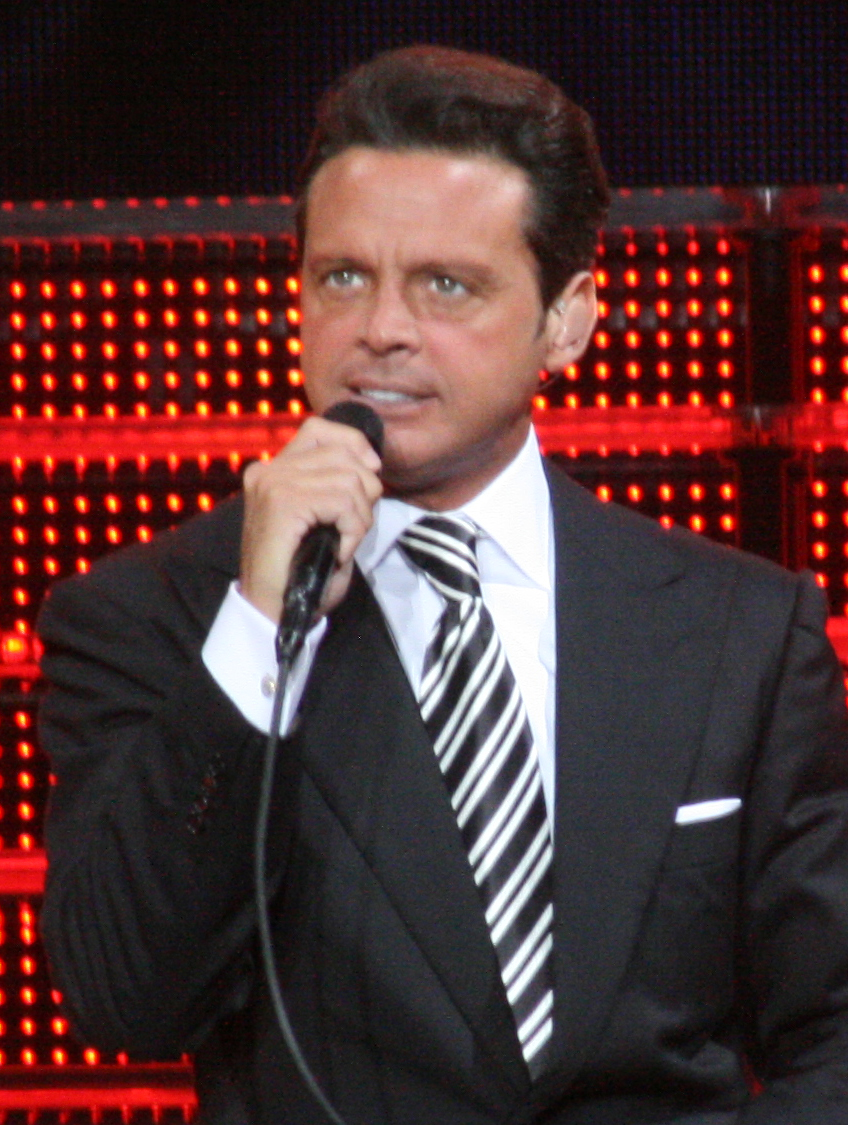
The success of Luis Miguel's Romance (1991) led to a renewed mainstream interest in the bolero genre in the Latin pop field.

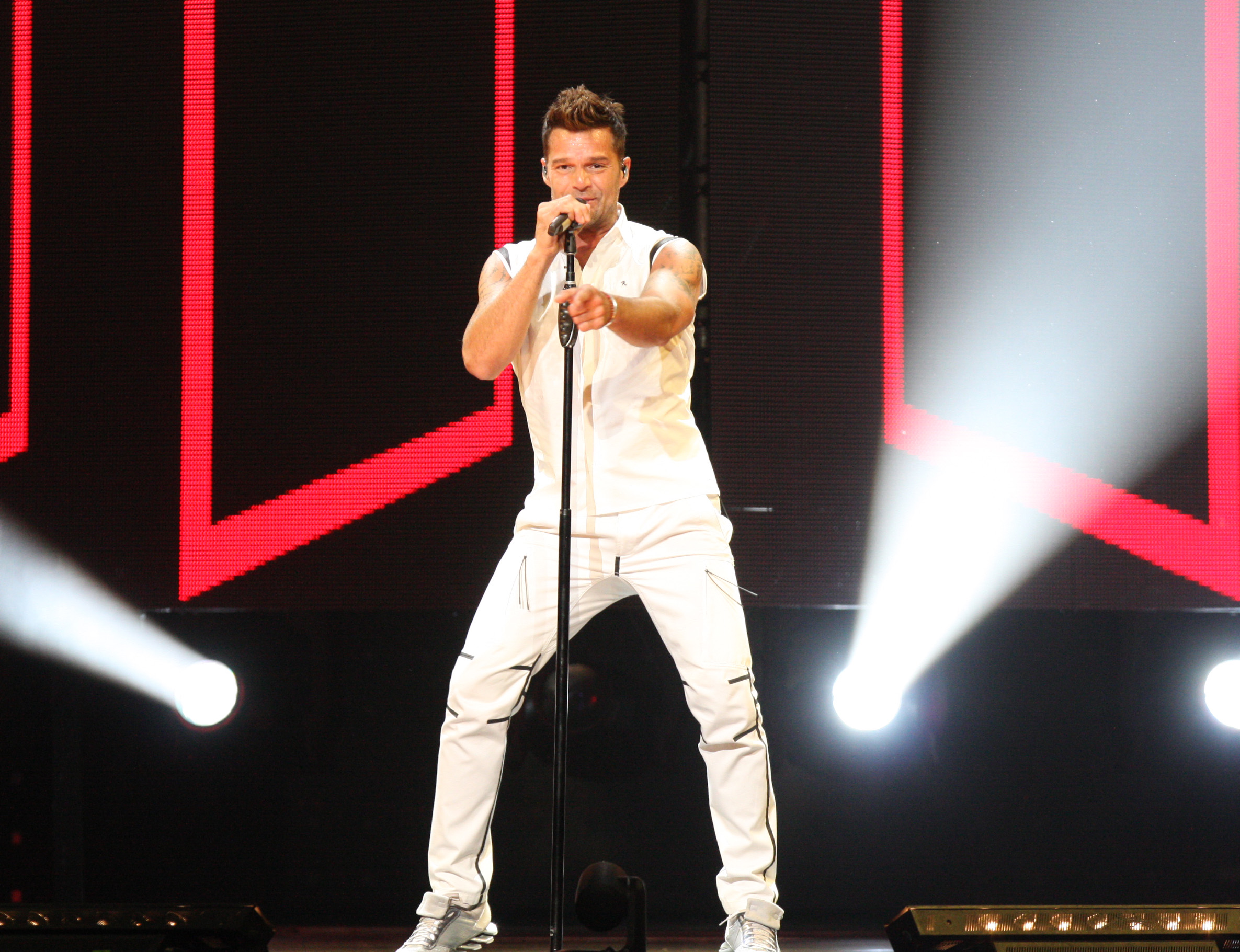
Ricky Martin's "Livin' la Vida Loca" kickstarted the "Latin Pop Explosion" of the late 1990s.

Like the previous two decades, Latin pop was mainly dominated by baladas. Unlike the Latin balladeers of the 1970s and 1980s however, Latin crooners in the 1990s such as Luis Miguel, Cristian Castro, Ricky Martin, Enrique Iglesias, and Alejandro Fernández, were much younger (being in their 20s) and appealed to a more youthful audience. Luis Miguel, whose early recordings consisted of soft rock and pop ballad tunes, released Romance, a collection of bolero covers, in 1991. The album's popularity led to a renewed interested in the genre in the Latin pop field.

Baladas were not the only popular form of Latin pop music in the 1990s. Martin, despite the positive reactions of his first two ballad-laden albums, his 1991 self-titled album and Me Amaras (1993), experimented with the sounds of the Spanish-speaking Caribbean for his third studio album A Medio Vivir (1995), despite the reluctance of his record label Sony Discos. The album spawned the hit single, "María", which made the artist's popularity expand outside of Latin America, particularly in Europe. The song captured the attention of FIFA, who requested Martin to record the theme for the 1998 World Cup. This led to the single "La Copa de la Vida". Ricky Martin's performance of the song at the 41st Annual Grammy Awards on February 24, 1999, was said to be a "game-changer for Latin music worldwide" according to Billboard's Leila Cobo. The popularity of Martin's performance was followed by the release of his song, "Livin' la Vida Loca", became an international success, and was credited with for the starting "Latin Pop Explosion" in 1999.

Other artists who became famous in the mid-1990s with the rhythmic take of Latin pop included Mexican singer Fey and former Timbiriche member Thalía. Around the same time, artists from Italy such as Eros Ramazzotti, Laura Pausini, and Nek successfully crossed over to the Latin music field by recording Spanish-language versions hits of their songs.

=== Latin rock/alternative and rock en español ===
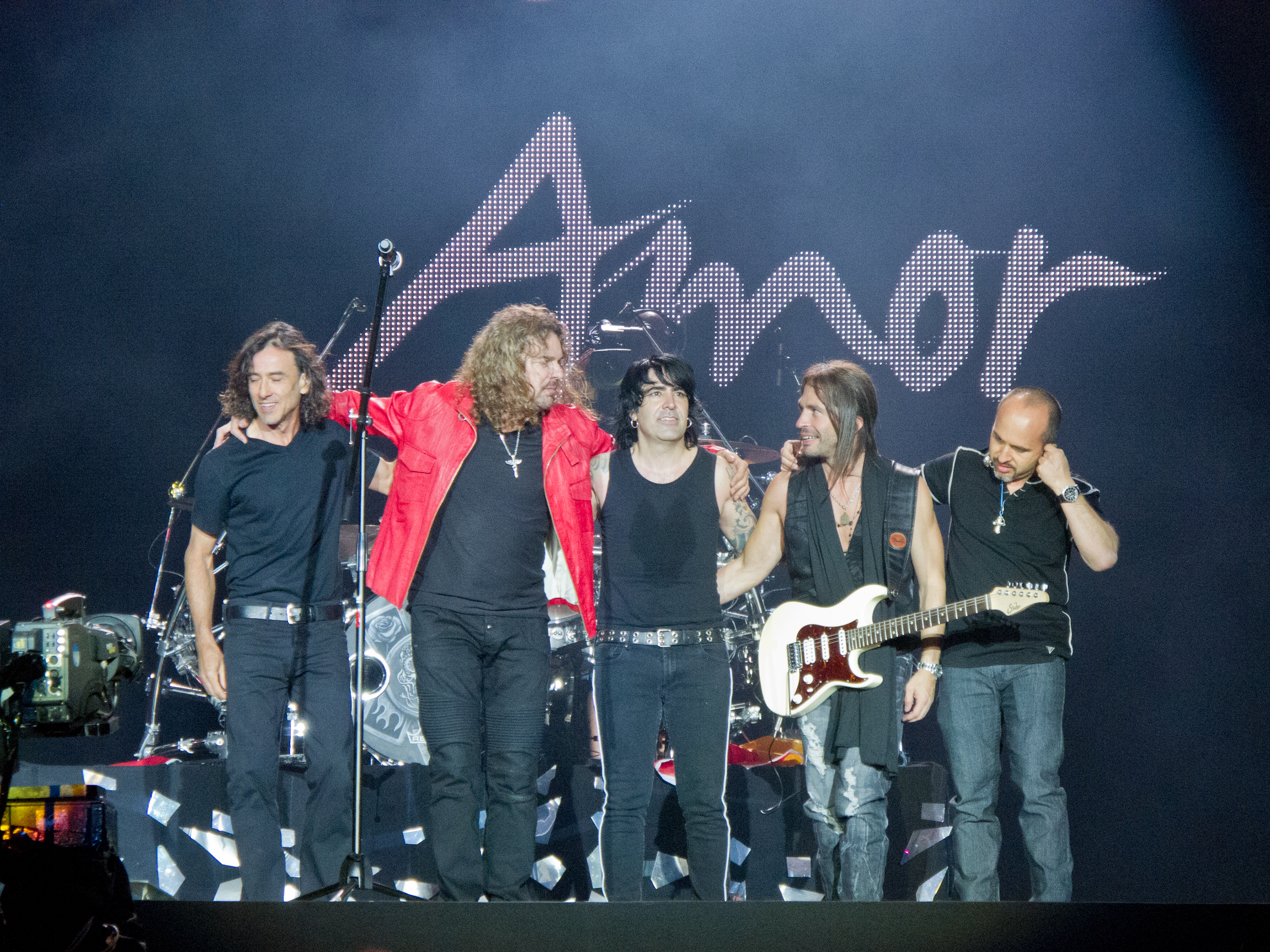
Maná became the first commercially successful rock en español to cross-over the pop field due to Latin rock rhythms.

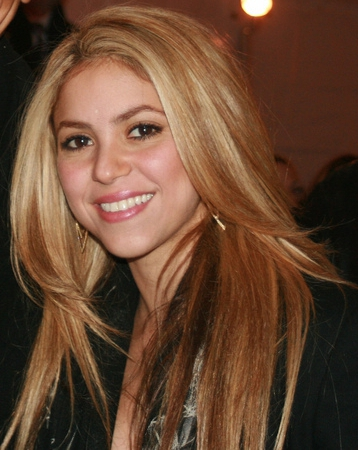
Colombian singer Shakira became the first successful female rock en español artist to achieve popularity in Latin America.

Mexican rock in the 1990s was a period of growth with several Mexican bands such Café Tacuba, El Gran Silencio, and Plastilina Mosh fusing rock music other genres such as punk and alternative as well as other Latin rhythms. According to Janet Sturman's book, The SAGE International Encyclopedia of Music and Culture (2019): "The decade resulted in such a wide variety of styles that it became complicated to categorize all of them just as rock". Maná became one of the most well-known Latin rock band internationally due to their "prosaic but remarkably popular strain of Latin-influenced rock music".

Elsewhere, particularly in South America, rock en español remained popular in Argentina. Fito Páez's El amor después del amor (1992) became one of the best-selling albums in Argentina having been certified diamond by CAPIF. Colombian rock en español bands tended to sell more outside of their native country. When Shakira released Pies Descalzos in 1995, she became the first rockera in the country to achieve success within and outside Colombia. Shakira was dubbed the "Latina Alanis Morissette" in the 1990s.

Guatemala's Ricardo Arjona became known, not only for his pop rock sound, but as well as his political and social commentaries in his albums. In the late 1990s, Latin alternative bands emerged into popularity such as Aterciopelados, Gustavo Cerati, Illya Kuryaki, King Changó, and Los Amigos Invisibles.

=== Regional Mexican ===
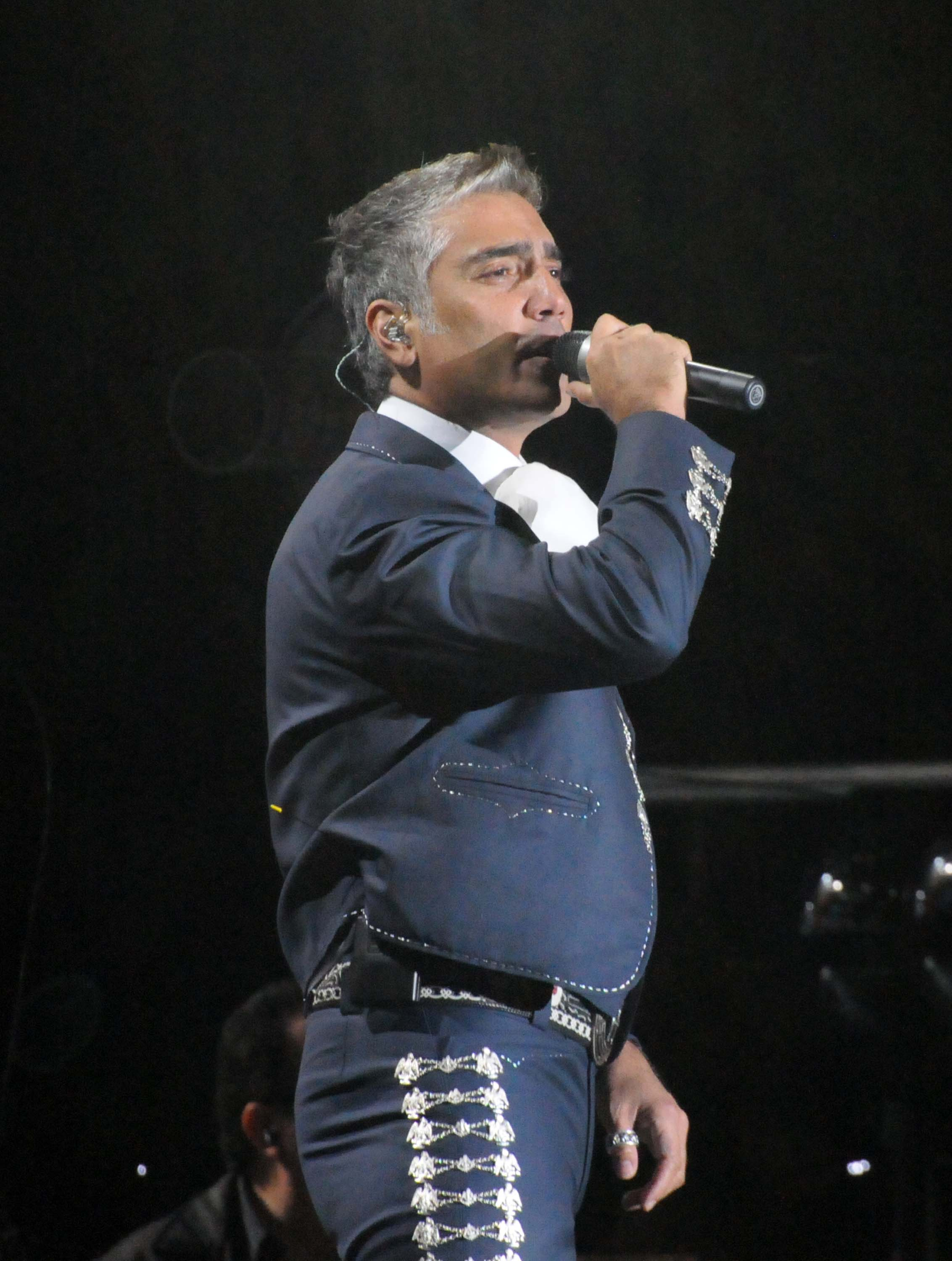
Vicente Fernández's son, Alejandro Fernández, became one of the new faces of the ranchera by utilizing pop-strings on mariachi records.

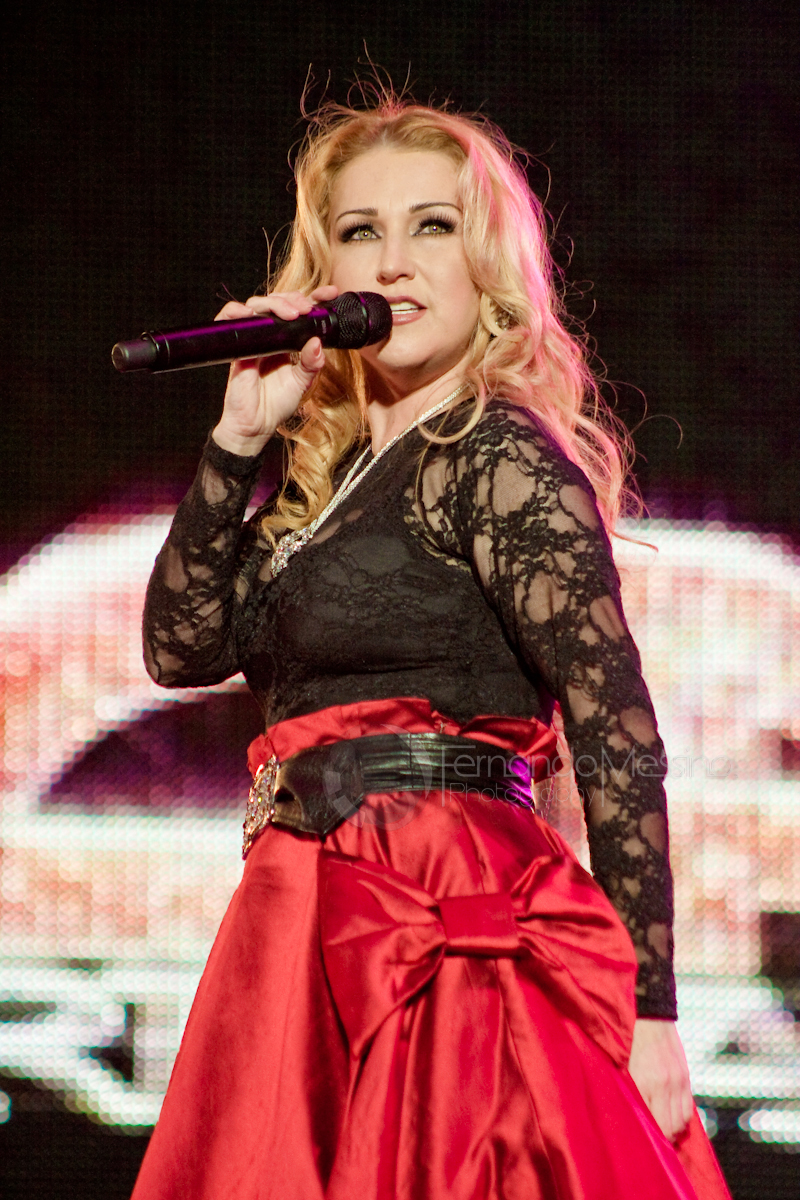
Grupo Limite (former lead singer Alicia Villarreal pictured) continued the popularity of the grupera genre.

On January 10, 1990, EMI Latin bought Bob Grever's Cara Records, beginning the golden age of Tejano music. Tejano music's growth exploded, as journalist Ramiro Burr put it as "a stubborn brushfire spread over the horizon", the genre converted radio stations into playing Tejano music. This garnered the attention of record labels across the United States who were eager to expand their current rosters. In 1991, Warner Nashville created Warner Discos specifically for Tejano artists crossing over into country music while Arista Nashville erected Artista Texas with the same objective. Other labels such as PolyGram Latino and WEA Latina began deliberations on opening operations to exclusively sign Tejano acts, while Fonovisa began signing Tejano musicians. These incentives helped expanded performers' fanbases beyond Texas and the southwest, it also brought the genre to territories unfamiliar with the genre. The golden age is generally considered by journalists to have ended on March 31, 1995, when Selena was shot and killed. Tejano music posted a five consecutive year sales and concert attendance record beginning in 1990. Mario Tarradell of The Dallas Morning News wrote that the singles from Amor Prohibido elevated Selena to success on Latin radio whose promoters had not previously taken the singer seriously. As a result of Selena's commercial success, female representation in Tejano music increased as record companies began investing heavily in that market, which historically had been inescapably male-dominated. By 1994, Tejano acts were effortlessly selling 100,000 units of their albums, while La Mafia and Selena were the two most commercially successful Tejano artists. Selena's music led the genre's 1990s revival and made it marketable for the first time. Tejano music is believed by Jose Behar to have hit Mexico "like an atomic bomb" by 1994. While Tejano singer Emilio Navaira decided on a crossover into American country music, preparations began for Selena's crossover into American pop music. The singer was fatally wounded after a confrontation with a former associate of her fan club, and boutiques. Selena's unfinished crossover album, Dreaming of You (1995), became the first mostly-Spanish album to debut and peak at number one on the US Billboard 200 chart. Tejano music suffered and its popularity waned following Selena's death, and record labels began abandoning their Tejano artists.

By the mid-1990s, Tejano music was replaced by Latin pop as the dominant Latin music genre in the United States, while radio stations in the US switched from Tejano to Regional Mexican music. Regional Mexican music radio stations began dominating the airways in California and in Chicago. Almost half of all reporting stations in the US for Billboard magazine were from regional Mexican music stations. By 1996, regional Mexican music genres such as banda, norteño, and ranchera, began experiencing explosive growth in the US and Mexico. Largely ignored by major record companies, regional Mexican music indie labels began joint ventures with major US and Mexican record companies interested in growing their footprint in the market. According to Camelot Music, its chain of stores saw an increase in purchases of regional Mexican music by consumers throughout the country, including in states such as Ohio and Georgia, areas where regional Mexican music traditionally was not selling. According to Henry Cardenas, a music promoter based in Chicago, the rise in popularity of regional Mexican music was the artists' flexibility and overall positive attitudes compared to their Latin pop counterparts. Latin music artists such as salsa singer Olga Tanon and Tejano artists La Mafia, Navaira, and before her death Selena, began experimenting with regional Mexican music genres in their repertoires. As a result of an increase in immigration from Mexico into the US, DISA saw an increase of 40% year-over-year by 1998 from their regional Mexican music artists. Vicente Fernandez, who was inducted into the Billboard Latin Music Hall of Fame, filled seven stadiums to their capacity in Colombia, as well as one in Los Angeles. His son, Alejandro Fernandez scaled to the top of the Billboard album charts within a few years span, and he became the first act to simultaneously peak atop the Latin Pop Albums and Regional Mexican Albums charts with Me Estoy Enamorando (1997) and Muy Dentro de Mi Corazon (1996), respectively.

Elsewhere in Mexico, the Mexican cumbia and grupera continued to remain relevant in the Region Mexican field as they did in the 1980s, but by the late 1990s, both genres moved to a slower-paced rhythm. Grupera and Mexican cumbia artists such as Grupo Limite, Grupo Bronco, and Los Mier dominated the grupera genre in the 1990s.

=== Tropical/salsa ===
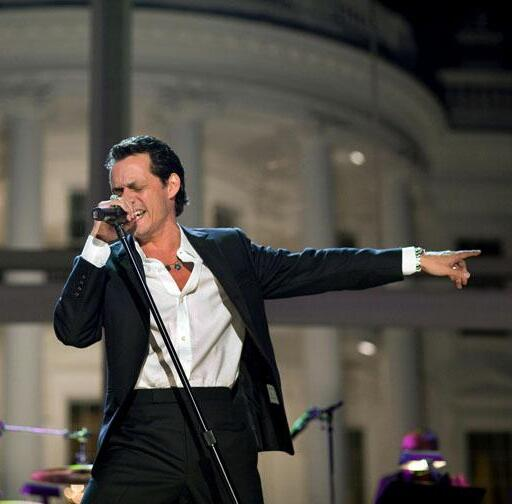
Marc Anthony represented a new generation of younger salsa acts in the 1990s and would eventually the best-selling tropical/salsa artist of all-time

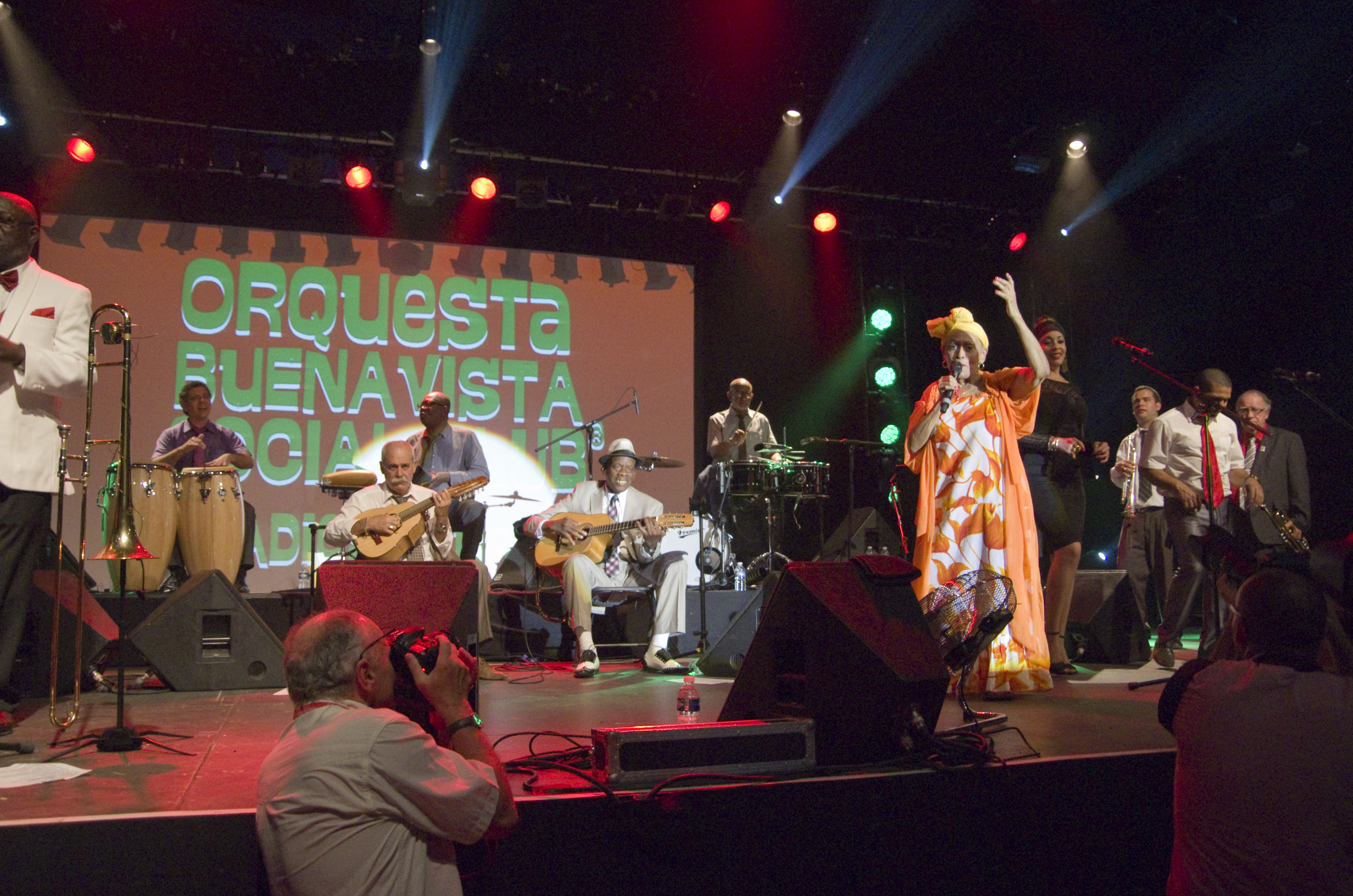
Ry Cooder's collaboration with Buena Vista Social Club on their 1997 self-titled brought traditional Cuban music to an international audience.

The salsa romántica movement, which dominated the late 1980s and continued to do so in the early 1990s. Artists who were backing vocalists such as Jerry Rivera and Víctor Manuelle gained attention as soloists and adapted their form of Puerto Rican salsa romántica. Rivera's album Cuenta Conmigo (1992) became the best-selling salsa album since Siembra (1978) by Willie Colón and Rubén Blades. The New York style of salsa music, which was dormant in the 1980s due to the decline of Fania Records' popularity, saw a revival in the 1990s. Having founded the self-titled RMM in 1987, Ralph Mercado recruited Sergio George. Mercado, who had established himself a business promoter for salsa music, had recruited many salsa veterans from the Fania Records-era to his label including Celia Cruz, Tito Puente, and Oscar D'Leon. Newer salsa acts such as such as Marc Anthony and La India worked with George to fuse salsa with the sounds of R&B, soul, and hip hop. Anthony would later become the best-selling tropical/salsa artist of all time. George further experimented with salsa and hip hip and formed Dark Latin Groove with frontman Huey Dunbar.

The Dominican Republic merengue also continued rival salsa in popularity. Wilfrido Vargas and Johnny Ventura were attributed to its success and began being accepted in Puerto Rico. However, due to the boycott of merengue orchestras by the Federation of Puerto Rican music in the island, several Puerto Rican merengue acts began to emerge. These included Grupo Manía, Los Sabrosos del Merengue, and Limi-T 21. Former Grupo Manía member Elvis Crespo's song "Suavemente" became an international success and pushed the genre's popularity outside of Latin America. In the early-to-mid 1990s, Dominicans living in New York City fused the sounds of merengue and hip hop to create merenhouse. Proyecto Uno's "Tiburón" became the most well-known song in the merenrap field. As with Puerto Rico, Venezuelan adopted their form of merengue called technomerengue. The trend started in the late 1980s and continued in the early 1990s with acts as Los Fantasmas del Cariba, Karolina, and Los Melodicos.

Also from the Dominican Republic is bachata. This was generally regarded as lower-class music in the Dominican Republic and was ignored by the media. When Dominican Republic singer-songwriter Juan Luis Guerra released Bachata Rosa in 1990, led bachata to become a mainstream genre in the country. After Bachata Rosa, many other Dominican Republic artists have been recognized as important to the growth of the genre in the 1990s including Luis Vargas, Antony Santos, Raulín Rodríguez, and Elvis Martínez.

Cuban music saw of resurgence of popularity in the decade. In 1993, Gloria Estefan (whose Miami Sound Machine band had popularized Latin pop sound to the Anglo market in the 1980s) released Mi Tierra, her first album in Spanish. The record draws from the music of Cuban during the 1940s and 1950s including son and boleros and sold over a million copies in the United States alone. Four years later, American musician Ry Cooder collaborated with Cuban musical group Buena Vista Social Club to release their self-titled album. Despite the lack of promotion on radio stations the musicians being elderly, and the music in Spanish, the album found international success and sold over 12 million copies.

In a similar vein to Miguel's Romance, in 1993 Colombian singer Carlos Vives released Clásicos de la Provincia, a collection of classic vallenatos. The record exposed the genre to a wider audience outside of its native country as Vives gave the tracks an updated take. The cumbia villera developed in the slums of Argentina in the mid-1990s. Although cumbia always had a following in the country, utilized keyboards and electric drums with the lyrics emphasizing on drugs, crime, and provocative sexual content.

=== Rap en español ===
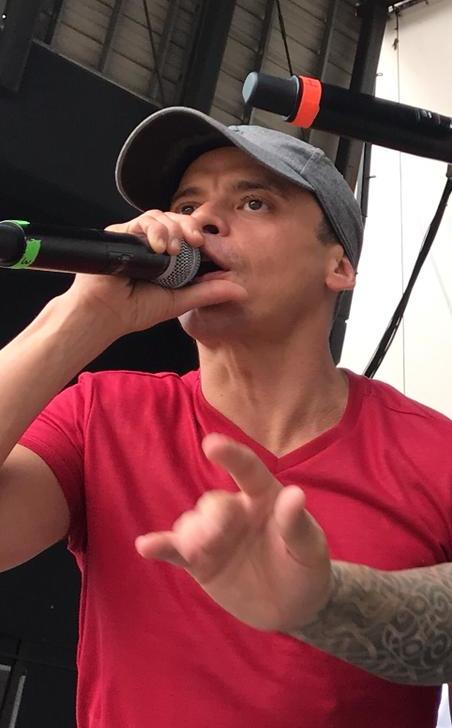
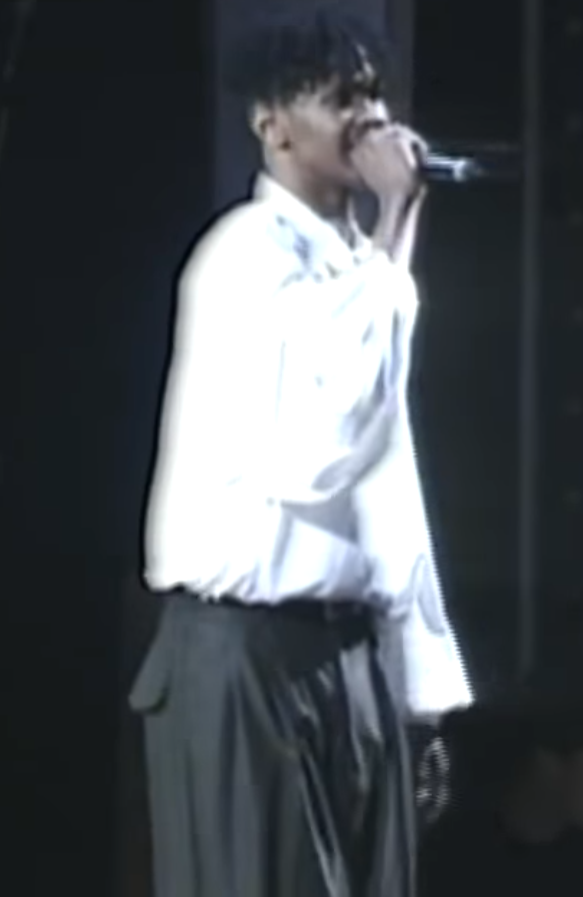
Vico C (left) and El General (right) were early pioneers of Latin hip hop.

The success of hip hop in the Western world resonated with the poor working class of Latin America, especially within the Afro-Latino community. Artists such as Vico C and El General experimented the sounds of hip hop with the sounds of Latin America. This would later give birth a new genre known as reggaeton which became prevalent in the 2000s.

=== Brazilian/Portuguese ===
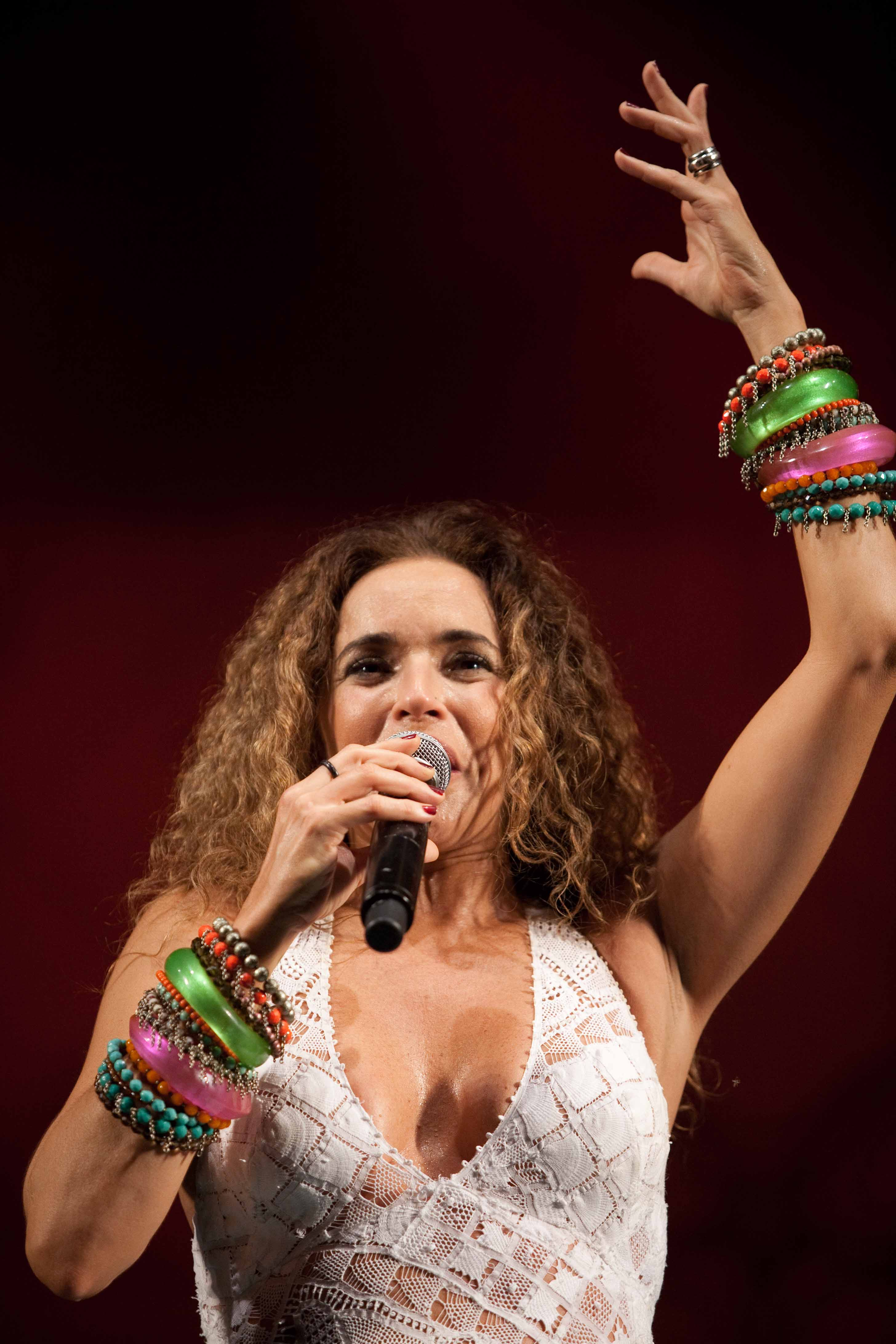
Daniela Mercury bought the axé music to a wider audience outside of the Afro-Brazilian circle

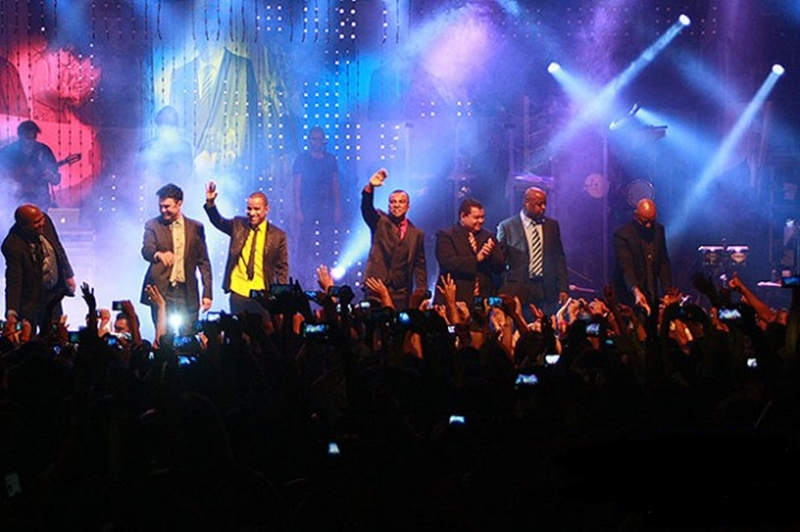
Só Pra Contrariar was one of the most successful bands of the 1990s in Brazil.

A new form of Afro-Brazilian music, known as axé, from the Bahía region, began to emerge in the late 1980s and continued into the early 1990s. Daniela Mercury, a white Bahian singer, expanded the genre's popularity outside of the Afro-Brazilian community. A form of samba music known as pagode was also very commercially success in the country during the 1990s with bands such as Só Pra Contrariar.

== See also ==
- 1990s in music

== Works cited ==
- Burr, Ramiro (April 23, 1994). "Tejano". Billboard. Vol. 106, no. 17. pp. 30, 32, 34.
- Burr, Ramiro (July 25, 1998). "Hats Off to the Music of Regional Mexican". Billboard.
- Burr, Ramiro (1999). The Billboard Guide to Tejano and Regional Mexican Music. Billboard books. ISBN 0-8230-7691-1.
- Lannert, John (August 5, 1995). "Selena's Dreaming of You is Bittersweet Hit for Late EMI Star". Billboard. Vol. 107, no. 31. p. 1.
- Lannert, John; Burr, Ramiro (August 17, 1996). "Regional Mexican Music". Billboard. Vol. 108, no. 33.
- Maciel, David; Ortiz, Isidro D.; Herrera-Sobek, Mar'a (2000). Chicano renaissance : contemporary cultural trends. Tucson: University of Arizona Press. p. 330. ISBN 0816520216.
- Patoski, Joe Nick (1996). Selena: Como La Flor. Boston: Little Brown and Company. ISBN 0-316-69378-2.
- Patoski, Joe Nick (May 2000). "Tuned Out". Texas Monthly.
- Patoski, Joe Nick (March 23, 2020). "A Timeline of Tejano Music". Cowboys & Indians.
- Saldana, Hector (August 16, 2015). "Tejano music enjoyed a decade-long golden age". My San Antonio.
- San Miguel, Guadalupe (2002). Tejano Proud. Texas A&M University Press. p. 192. ISBN 1585441880.
- San Miguel, Guadalupe (2002a). "When Tejano Ruled The Airways: The Rise and Fall of KQQK in Houston, Texas". NACCS Annual Conference Proceedings (PDF). Vol. 13. Western Association of Schools and Colleges – via SJSU ScholarWorks.
- Schone, Mark (April 20, 1995). "A Postmortem Star in death, Selena is a crossover success". Newsday.
- Shaw, Lisa (2005). Pop Culture Latin America!: Media, Arts, and Lifestyle. ABC-CLIO. ISBN 1-85109-504-7.
- Tarradell, Mario (April 1, 1995). "Singer soared beyond traditional limits on Tejano music". The Dallas Morning News.
- Untiedt, Kenneth L. (2013). Cowboys, Cops, Killers, and Ghosts: Legends and Lore in Texas. University of North Texas Press. ISBN 978-1-57441-532-2.
