= Henry Fiol =

American singer, songwriter, bandleader and painter (born 1947)

- Born: January 16, 1947 (age 78); Manhattan, New York, United States
- Genres: Son cubano, guajira
- Occupation(s): Musician, songwriter, arranger, bandleader, producer, painter
- Instrument: Voice
- Years active: 1969–present
- Labels: Mericana, SAR, Salsoul, Corazón, El Abuelo, Earthworks, Palacio Rodven, Kubaney, Fonocaribe

Henry Fiol (born January 16, 1947) is an American singer, songwriter, bandleader and painter. He is known for his traditional approach to son cubano and other Cuban music styles, and he is considered a "cult favorite" among Latin music fans.

Fiol was born in Manhattan, New York, United States, to an Italian-American mother and a Puerto Rican father. He studied fine arts at Hunter College and became a teacher before starting his career as a musician in the 1969. In 1974, he co-founded, along with William Millán, a Cuban-style conjunto called Saoco, recording two albums with the group, Siempre seré guajiro for Mericana Records and Macho Mumba for Salsoul Records. He was the bandleader, singer, songwriter and cover artist for both albums, before leaving the band because of creative differences with Millán. William Millán was the sole leader of Saoco on its next two and final albums. In 1980, Henry Fiol made his solo debut on SAR Records. He recorded two more albums for the label before forming his own record company, Corazón, along with a new band of the same name. He continued to release albums over the following decades. His latest album, Ciudadano del mundo, was released in 2012.

His son, Orlando Fiol, is a pianist and conga drummer.

== Discography ==
With Saoco

- 1976: Siempre seré guajiro (Mericana)
- 1977: Macho mumba (Salsoul)

Solo albums

- 1980: Fe, esperanza y caridad' (SAR)
- 1981: El secreto (SAR)
- 1983: La ley de la jungla (SAR)
- 1983: Corazón (Corazón)
- 1985: Colorao y negro (Corazón)
- 1986: Juega billar (Corazón)
- 1989: Renacimiento (El Abuelo)
- 1990: Sonero (Earthworks)
- 1991: Creativo (Palacio Rodven)
- 1994: El don del son (Codiscos/Kubaney)
- 2002: Guapería (Fonocaribe)
- 2008: De cachete (Corazón)
- 2011: Salsa subterránea (Corazón)
- 2012: Ciudadano del mundo (Corazón)
