= Por Tu Maldito Amor =

Studio album by Vicente Fernández
- Released: 1989
- Length: 36:24
- Language: Spanish
- Label: Sony Music Latin
- Producer: A.B. Quintanilla

Vicente Fernández chronology
Lo Mejor de la Baraja del Rey (1988)	Por Tu Maldito Amor (1989)	Vicente Fernandez Y Las Classicas de J.A. Jimenez (1990)

Singles from Por Tu Maldito Amor
- 1. "Por Tu Maldito Amor" Released: 1989; 2. "Aunque Mal Paguen Ellas" Released: 1990

Por Tu Maldito Amor (English: Because of Your Damn Love) is the fifteenth studio album by Mexican mariachi singer Vicente Fernández, released in 1989 through Sony Music Latin. The album remained atop the US Billboard Regional Mexican Albums chart for 21 consecutive weeks. It was certified 2× Platinum (Latin field) by the Recording Industry Association of America (RIAA) for shipments of 200,000 units in the United States.

== Track listing ==
No.	Title	Writer(s)	Length
1.	"Por Tu Maldito Amor"	Federico Mendez	3:56
2.	"Puro Cachanilla"	Antonio Valdez Herrera	3:19
3.	"Demente"	Indalecio Ramírez	3:09
4.	"Te Quiero Ver"	Fernando Z. Maldonado	2:45
5.	"Alma Angelina"	Manuel Acuña, Felipe Valdés Leal	3:05
6.	"Despues del Rosario"	Indalecio Ramírez	2:19
7.	"Aunque Mal Paguen Ellas"	Federico Mendez	3:27
8.	"No Tiene Nombre"		2:21
9.	"Te Lo Juro Por Dios"		3:15
10.	"No Tengas Miedo Maria"	Reinaldo Ornelas	3:06
11.	"La Caminera"	Antonio Valdez Herrera	2:54
12.	"No Te Culpes"	Homero Aguilar	2:48

== Charts ==
=== Weekly charts ===
Chart (1989/1990)	Peak position
US Billboard Regional Mexican Albums	1

== Certifications ==
Region	Certification	Certified units/sales
United States (RIAA)	2× Platinum (Latin)	200,000^{^}
^{^} Shipments figures based on certification alone.
