= Chuck Anderson (jazz guitarist) =

American jazz guitarist (born 1947)

- Born: June 21, 1947 (age 78); Chicago, Illinois, U.S.
- Genres: Jazz
- Occupations: Musician
- Instruments: Guitar

Chuck Anderson (born June 21, 1947) is an American jazz guitarist based in suburban Philadelphia, Pennsylvania.

== Early life ==
Anderson was born in Chicago, Illinois on June 21, 1947. He began guitar lessons at the age of 14. By 1963, he was teaching guitar and playing in a band.

At the age of 19, he began studies with Dennis Sandole. Sandole was notable for his association with John Coltrane, James Moody, Michael Brecker, Pat Martino, and Jim Hall.

== Career ==
In 1969, Anderson was offered the staff guitar job at the Latin Casino in Cherry Hill, New Jersey. The Latin was a popular venue before gambling came to Atlantic City. During that period, he accompanied and performed with Bobby Darin, Billy Eckstine, and Peggy Lee, playing fourteen shows a week.

In 1973, he returned to jazz and formed the Chuck Anderson Trio with Al Stauffer on bass and Ray Deeley on drums. Four years later, he got the staff guitar job at Valley Forge Music Fair in Devon, Pennsylvania. He worked with Nancy Wilson, Michel LeGrand, and Anthony Newley. In the years that followed, he concentrated on teaching, composing, and session work.

He has written a column, "The Art and Science of Jazz", for the web magazine All About Jazz.
