= Bonny Cepeda =

Dominican singer (born 1954)

Fernando Antonio Cruz Paz, (born June 5, 1954) better known by his stage name Bonny Cepeda, is a Dominican merengue singer. In 1986 he was nominated for a Grammy Award for Top Tropical Latin Performance for his album, Noche de Discotheque.

Cruz served as the Vice Minister of Culture of the Dominican Republic (Spanish: Viceministro de Cultura de la República Dominicana) under the 53rd President of the Dominican Republic, Luis Abinader.

== Early life ==
Fernando Antonio Cruz Paz was born on June 5, 1954, in the capital of Santo Domingo, in the Dominican Republic. His father, Anan Cepeda, was a famous merengue singer. He is the brother of merengue singer Richie Cepeda.

== Career ==
Cepeda made history as the first merengue artist to receive a Grammy nomination. He was nominated at the 28th Annual Grammy Awards in 1986 in the category of Best Tropical Latin Performance for his hit album Noche de Discotheque. In June 2021 Bonny declared in the Alofoke Radio Show that he received $60 000 to sing in a birthday party of the Venezuelan leader Nicolás Maduro. His comments generated criticism in social media and by members of the Venezuelan opposition due to the social and economic crisis that the country undergoes and because the celebration took place during the COVID-19 pandemic, when borders were restricted for most Venezuelans. Bonny afterwards denied having been paid.

== Discography ==
- Bonny Cepeda y la Gran Orquesta (1976)
1. Donde Está Dios
2. Llegó la Hora
3. Mi Barrio
4. No
5. Canto a los Pueblos
6. A René
7. El Ven Tú
8. Quiero Estar en el Fin
- La Gente Contenta (1977)
1. Canto de la Montaña
2. Dime la Verdad
3. A Mi Pueblo
4. Hay Que Luchar Hasta el Fin
5. Enigma
6. La Gente Contenta
7. Mi Hijo
8. Sampabolla
- Esta Es Tu Tierra (1977)
1. Contestación al Negrito del Batey
2. Canto a la Montaña
3. Don Augusto
4. Enigma
5. Esta Es Tu Tierra
6. El Chofer
7. La Gente Contenta
8. La Bola
9. El Hundío
10. Canto a Mis Pueblos
- Bonny Con Kenton (1978)
1. El Paso de las Lentejas
2. Frente a Frente
3. La Misma Flor
4. Ansiedad
5. El Perico
6. Los Melones
7. Santiago
8. Ojos Que Habla
9. Penumbras
10. La Protesta de los Grandes
- El Maestro (1980)
1. La Gran Manzana
2. Cruce de Canales
3. El Retrato de Mamá
4. Como Está la Cosa
5. Muchacho de Barrio
6. Ay! San Antonio
7. Para Mimi
8. Homenaje a Javier Solís
- ¡Arrasando Con Todo! (1982, reissued 1999)
1. Me Tiene Chivo
2. Muchacha Curazoleña
3. El Hijo de Madam Inés
4. La Carta de Margot
5. Yo Te Ví
6. Hoy Rio Yo
7. La Hija y la Mamá
8. Ay! Doctor
- El Mandamás (1983)
1. El Ñe Ñe Ñe
2. Mundo Raro
3. Las Novelas o Yo
4. Campesina de Mi Tierra
5. No Me Abandones Margot
6. Bueno Que Me Pase
7. Ya Soy Papá
8. Jibarita Puertorriqueña
9. El Mandamás
10. Penas
- De Ahí, Ahí (1983)
1. Obertura
2. El Gufeo
3. Márchate
4. Donde Está la Plata
5. Feel So Good
6. Estoy Caliente
7. Así Empezaron
8. Un Tipo Como Yo
9. Decídelo Tú
- El Invasor (1984, reissued 2001)
1. El Perico
2. Donde Quiera Esto Está Mal
3. O Si o No
4. Fin de Semana
5. El Ladrón de Tu Amor
6. El Jugador
7. El Preso No. 40
8. El Gago
9. La Cosa Está Dura
10. Lo Que Más Me Gusta de Ti
- Noche de Discotheque (1985)
1. Mehui Mehui
2. Tú Con Él
3. Quisiera Ser
4. Me Acostumbré
5. Noche de Discotheque
6. Ya Mismo Partiré
7. Vuelve
8. El Ladrón de Tu Amor
- Dance It! ¡Bailalo! (1986)
1. Asesina
2. Golpéame
3. El Caminante
4. Una Fotografía
5. Dance
6. Me Llamará
7. Baila en la Patronal
8. Sigan Bailando
- The Music Makers (1987)
1. Lucy
2. Club del Clan
3. Veneno
4. Entre la Espada y la Pared
5. Cuarto de Hotel
6. Dariana
7. Donde Estás
8. Yo Quiero Amarte
- A Nivel International (1988, reissued 1992)
1. Bruja Hechicera
2. Baby Say Yes
3. Mira Mi Espejo
4. Isla del Encanto
5. Ven Recorre Mi Cuerpo
6. Llegó el Amor
7. Amante Mía
8. La Chica de los Ojos Café
- Calor y Diferente (1989, reissued 1992)
1. El Nene Quiere Un Sobito
2. No Me Vuelvo a Enamorar
3. Quisiera Ser
4. Por el Amor de Una Mujer
5. Déjame
6. Infiel los Dos
7. Soy Dominicano
8. Don't Worry Be Happy
- Los 15 Éxitos de Bonny Cepeda (1989, compilation)
1. Ay Doctor
2. El Perico
3. El Hijo de Madam Inés
4. Me Tiene Chivo
5. El Gufeo
6. El Jugador
7. Estoy Caliente
8. El Mandamás
9. No Me Abandones Margot
10. El Preso
11. El Ñe Ñe Ñe
12. Feel So Good
13. El Ladrón de Tu Amor
14. La Carta de Margot
15. Decídelo Tú
- Pa' la Calle (1990, reissued 1992)
1. Pásame la Mano Morena
2. Dame Valor Dios Mío
3. Yo Soy el Jefe
4. Pa' Comerte
5. Fiesta de Graduación
6. La Cosquillita
7. Que Aprueben la ley
8. No Se Puede Hacer Nada
- Que Canten los Niños (1991)
1. De Quién es la Culpa
2. Porque de Mi
3. Isla del Encanto
4. Pobre Pueblo
5. Que Canten los Niños
6. Fiesta de Graduación
7. Dulce Colombiana
8. Bimbo
- Dance Party (1991)
1. El Riquito
2. El Japonés
3. Las Mujeres
4. Toribio, el Inocente
5. Me Casé Por Dinero
6. Que Empeño
7. Secretos
8. El Pañuelito
- Blanco y Negro (1992)
1. Salí a Papá y a Mamá
2. Traicionera
3. Todo Pasa
4. El Negro Ahí
5. Pantera
6. Dominican York
7. Tu Papá y Yo
8. Humo y Cerveza
9. Matame
10. Esta Noche Beberé
- Freedom (1992)
1. Caribe
2. Mi Vicio
3. El Pelotero
4. Despierta América
5. Soy
6. Amor Con Dolor
7. Mentiras
8. Maribel
9. La Americana
10. Te Prometo
- 100% Aprobado (1993)
1. Mi Medicina
2. Guachimán de Tu Amor
3. Tú No Te Vas
4. Aquí Se Goza
5. La India
6. Como Anillo al Dedo
7. Ay Papi
8. La Pastillita
9. Mami Ven Pa'ca
10. Mi Medicina (Versión Discoteca)
- 12 Golden Hits (1993, compilation)
1. Asesina
2. Cuarto de Hotel
3. El Riquito
4. El Nene Quiere Un Sobito
5. Yo Quiero Amarte
6. El Japonés
7. Una Fotografía
8. Que Canten los Niños
9. Yo Soy el Jefe
10. Como Anillo al Dedo
11. Pásame la Mano Morena
12. Bruja Hechicera
- El Mandamás Original (1994)
1. Como la Mía... Ninguna
2. Algo le Di Yo
3. Mi Doña
4. Huele a Ti
5. Mi Vecina
6. Llegó el Calor
7. Tu Marido... Te lo Implora
8. Carnaval
9. A Bailar Con el DJ
10. Vieja No... Usada
- Serie Platino (1994)
1. La Americana
2. Salí a Papá y a Mamá
3. Caribe
4. Dominican York
5. Matame
6. Esta Noche Beberé
7. Humo y Cerveza
8. Pantera
- Best Seller (1995)
1. Mangué de Amor
2. Yo Bailo Así
3. Atiéndela
4. Ay Mami
5. Las Mujeres Que Quieran Bailar
6. Salomé
7. Pena
8. Como No Voy a Decirlo
9. A los Hombres
10. Seré Discreto
11. Agua Con Sal
12. Mosaico Cepeda Para DJ
- Arrollador (1996)
1. Atiéndela
2. Como Anillo al Dedo
3. ¿Por Qué Me Hiciste Eso?
4. Tu Marido... Te lo Implora
5. Mi Medicina
6. A Bailar Con Bonny
7. A los Hombres
8. Seré Discreto
9. Mami Ven Pa'ca
10. Carnaval
- El Heavy: Nueva Etapa (1996)
1. La Quema
2. El Heavy
3. El Entierro (Versión Radio)
4. Me Aumentaron
5. Cuidado Con el Perro
6. Quién Te Pintó la Camisa
7. El Amor
8. Rompamos el Contrato
9. El Entierro (Versión Discoteca)
10. Santo Domingo (Sueño o Realidad)
- Oro Merenguero: 20 Éxitos (1996, compilation)

=== Vol. 1 ===
1. Salí a Papá y a Mamá
2. Caribe
3. El Pelotero
4. Soy
5. Esta Noche Beberé
6. Amor Con Dolor
7. Maribel
8. Humo y Cerveza
9. Todo Pasa
10. Mentiras

=== Vol. 2 ===
1. Dominican York
2. Te Prometo
3. Tu Papá y Yo
4. Traicionera
5. La Americana
6. Pantera
7. El Negro Ahí
8. Matame
9. Despierta América
10. Mi Vicio
- Come Back (1997)
1. La Fiesta Está Buena
2. El Baile del Culea
3. La Nena de Mi Grado
4. Agarraron al Compadre
5. Eso Es Federal
6. Como Decirte... Que
7. Un Día Más Pa' la Semana
8. Tengo Que Llorar
9. No Puedo Arrancarte de Mi
10. Viene el 2000
- La Nueva Ley (1998)
1. No Hay Nadie Más
2. De Verdad Te lo Digo
3. Bajo la Nueva Ley
4. No Vuelvo Más Contigo
5. Pa' la Calle
6. Quieres Volver
7. Dime Como Te Olvido
8. La Cotorrita
9. Boleto de Ida
- Navidad Con Bonny (2000)
1. Nos Asaltaron
2. Navidad Con Bonny
3. El Ulau
4. Como Anillo al Dedo
5. Mi Doña
6. Fiesta de Carnaval
7. Huele a Ti
8. Tu Marido... Te lo Implora
9. Mi Medicina (Versión Discoteca)
10. Como la Mía... Ninguna
11. Vieja No... Usada
12. Guachimán de Tu Amor
- Legado (2000, compilation)
1. Asesina
2. Una Fotografía
3. Ay Doctor
4. Cuando Llega el Lunes
5. Algo le Di Yo
6. Que Canten los Niños
7. Cuarto de Hotel
8. La Domadora
9. Aquí Se Goza
10. Mami Ven Pa'ca
11. Ay Papi
12. El Hijo de Madam Inés
- Tú Tenías Razón (2002)
1. Tú Tenías Razón
2. Amarte Es Un Problema
3. Ella Me Cuenta
4. No Hagas Una Tormenta
5. Al Que le Debo, Que Se Espere
6. Déjame Vivir
7. Volver a Amar
8. El Doctor (2da Parte)
9. Cuando Llega el Lunes
10. ¿Cómo Te Olvido?
11. Te Hice Mal
- Retro: Sus Éxitos (2004, compilation)
1. Remix de Éxitos
2. El Doctor
3. Asesina
4. Una Fotografía
5. Cuarto de Hotel
6. Que Canten los Niños
7. Algo le Di Yo
8. El Hijo de Madam Inés
9. Te Gusta Tu Moreno
10. El Doctor (Parte 2)
11. Me Tiene Chivo
12. Estoy Caliente
13. Si el Vecino Se Queja (A Dúo Con TNT)
14. Asesina (Reggaeton Con Zion y Lennox)
15. Despierta Pueblo
16. Bloopers de Grabación
- Sus Éxitos (2005, compilation)
1. Remix de Éxitos
2. Asesina
3. Asesina (Reggaeton Con Zion y Lennox)
4. Una Fotografía
5. Que Canten los Niños
6. Cuarto de Hotel
7. Ay Doctor
8. El Doctor (Parte 2)
9. Vuelve
10. El Pintalabio
11. Que No Me Faltes Tú
12. Cuando Llega el Lunes
13. Aquí Se Goza
- De Nuevo Pa' la Calle (2007)
1. Porque Te Hice el Amor
2. Me Gusta Como Baila
3. De 6 a 10
4. Te Gusta Tu Moreno
5. Necesito Espacio
6. Vuelve Vuelve
7. Vuelve Vuelve (Versión Bachata)
8. El Doctor (Parte 2)
9. El Pintalabios
10. La Mazucamba Majao
11. Despierta Pueblo
12. El Hijo de Madam Inés (Nueva Versión)
13. Asesina (Versión Reggaeton)
- Años Dorados (2008, compilation)
1. Me Tiene Chivo
2. Ay! Doctor
3. Lo Que Más Me Gusta de Ti
4. Una Fotografía
5. Asesina
6. Cuarto de Hotel
7. Golpéame
8. Algo le Di Yo
9. Noche de Discotheque
10. El Perico
11. Mehui Mehui
12. El Mandamás
13. El Ñe Ñe Ñe
14. Yo Soy el Jefe
15. Que Canten los Niños
16. El Hijo de Madam Inés
