= Beatriz Adriana =

Mexican singer (born 1958)

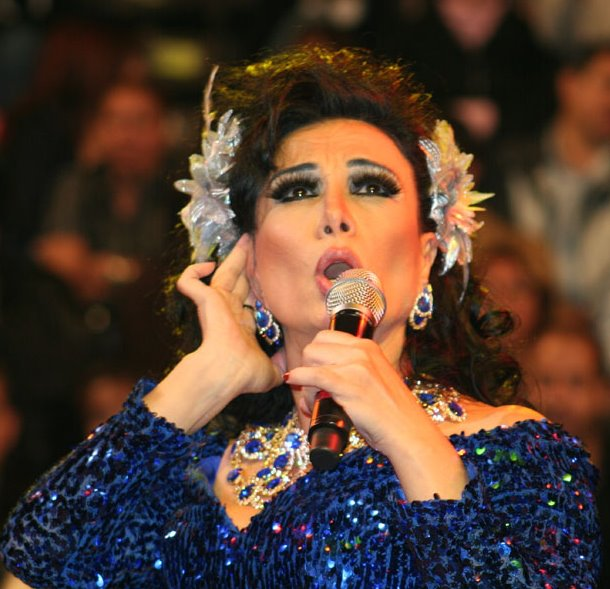
- Adriana in 2008

Background information
- Born: Beatriz Adriana Flores de Saracho; 5 March 1958 (age 68); Navojoa, Sonora, Mexico
- Genres: Mariachi, Latin pop
- Occupation: Singer
- Instrument: Vocals
- Years active: 1970–present
- Spouse: Marco Antonio Solís (m. 1983; div. 1987)

Beatriz Adriana Flores de Saracho (born March 5, 1958), commonly known as Beatriz Adriana, is a Mexican singer of ranchera.

Beatriz Adriana was born on 5 March 1958 in Navojoa, Sonora, and moved to Mexico City in 1970. She appeared in her first film, La Comadrita, at age 15 alongside La India María.

She has a recognized artistic trajectory in her country of origin. She is also the ex-wife of Mexican singer Marco Antonio Solís, with whom she has a daughter, also named Beatriz Adriana (but performs under the name Beatriz Solís). Adriana became a grandmother when her daughter Beatriz gave birth to a son, Leonardo.

They also had a son named Leonardo Martínez, who was murdered by kidnappers in 2000. Fearing for the life of her daughter Betty, she moved to the United States.
