= Chico Álvarez (singer) =

American musician

Ernesto "Chico" Álvarez Peraza is an American of Afro-Cuban origin artist of Latin American music. He was born in New York City but grew up in Cuba and currently lives in the state of New Jersey.

Álvarez has been performing as a singer throughout the New York City tri-state area since the 1980s. He currently performs with the Afro-Cuban band Mafimba and is also the host of a Latin jazz radio show on Sunday afternoons at WBAI Pacifica Radio (99.5 FM) called the New World Gallery.

Alvarez is the recipient of an award from the National Federation of Community Broadcasters and has interviewed famous artists such as Dizzy Gillespie and Tito Puente.
