= Nelson Ned =

Brazilian singer-songwriter (1947–2014)

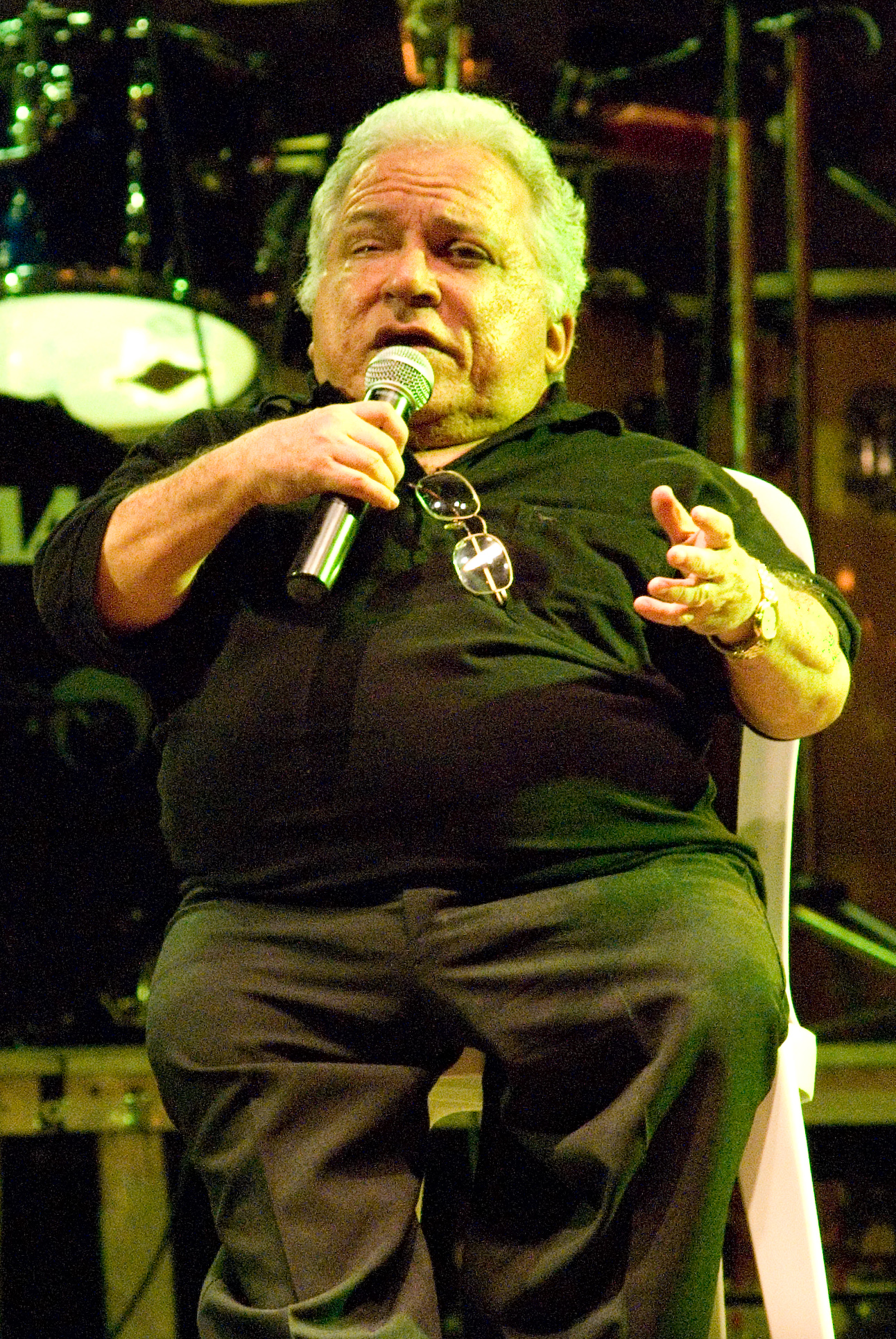
- Nelson Ned in 2008

Background information
- Born: Nelson Ned d'Ávila Pinto; 2 March 1947; Ubá, Minas Gerais, Brazil
- Died: 5 January 2014 (aged 66) São Paulo, São Paulo, Brazil
- Years active: 1963–2008

Nelson Ned d'Ávila Pinto (2 March 1947 – 5 January 2014) was a Brazilian singer-songwriter. He built a career as a singer and composer of sentimental, suffering songs, rising to popularity in Brazil and Latin America in 1969 and becoming known internationally, especially in Portugal, France and Spain. In 1971 he released his first Spanish album, Canción Popular, and performed in the US, Latin America, Europe, and Africa.

He was the first Latin artist to sell a million records in the U.S. with his hit "Happy Birthday My Darling" in 1974. He did instrumental work for the Electric Moog Orchestra in 1977. After his religious conversion in 1993, he only recorded Christian Evangelical songs in Portuguese, Spanish, and some in English.

== Biography ==
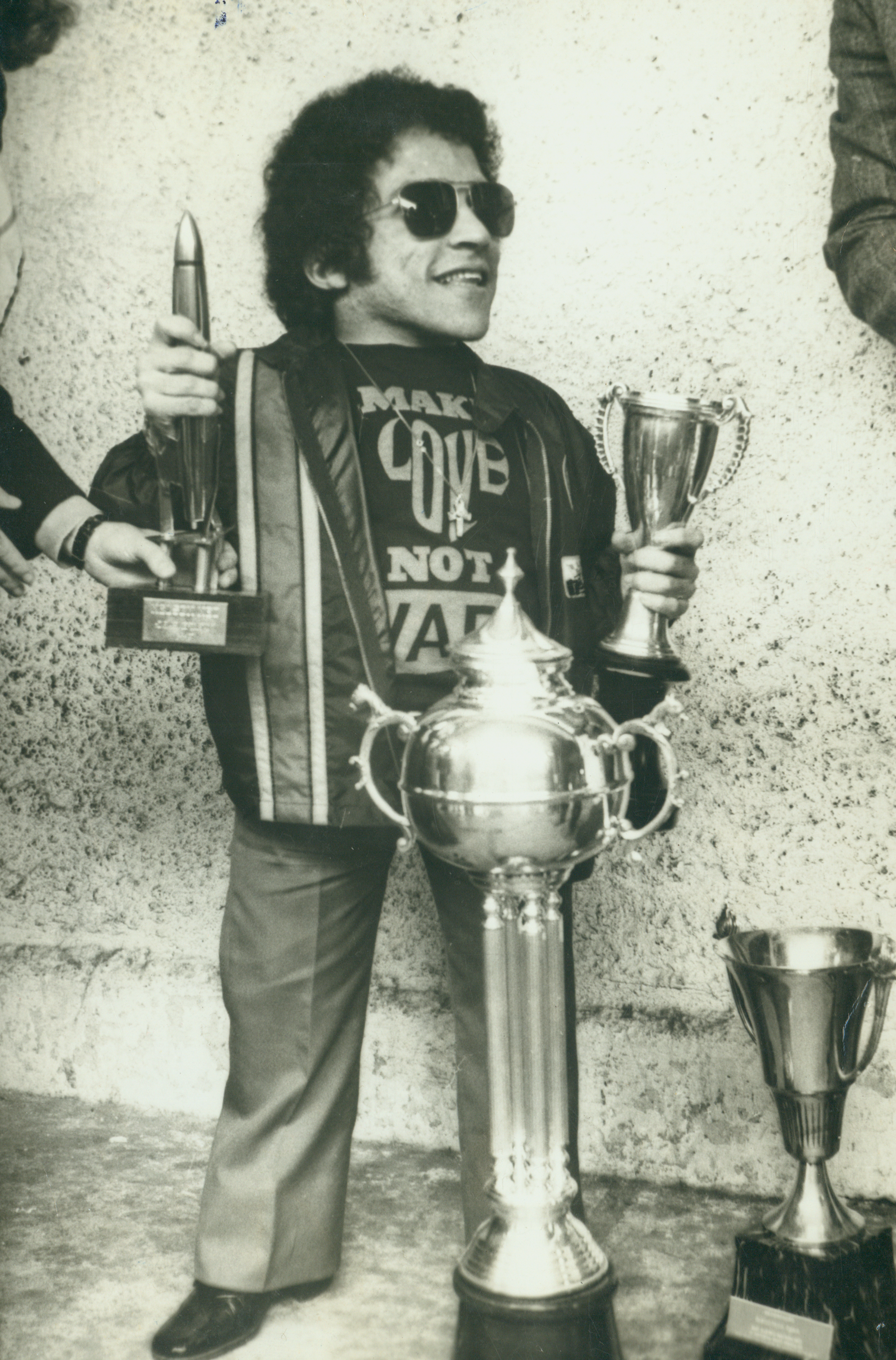
Nelson Ned in 1973

Nelson Ned d'Ávila Pinto was born in 1947 in Ubá, Minas Gerais, the eldest of seven siblings. He was the only sibling to develop dwarfism; as an adult he was 111 cm (3 ft 8 in) tall.

Ned married twice, and had three children with his second wife, María Aparecida. All three of his children developed dwarfism: Nelson Ned d'Ávila Jr. (108 cm (43 in)), a musician now living in Mexico; Monalisa Ned d'Ávila, a doctor; and Ana Verónica Ned Pinto (90 cm (35 in)), a singer and acrobat.

== Death ==
Nelson Ned died at age 66 from pneumonia and cardiac arrest at Hospital Regional de Cotia, in São Paulo on 5 January 2014.

== Discography ==
=== Studio albums ===
- Um Show em Noventa Centímetros (Polydor – 1964)
- Tudo Passará (Copacabana – 1969)
- Eu também sou Sentimental (Copacabana – 1970)
- Nelson Ned, Vol. 1 (Copacabana – 1970)
- Nelson Ned, Vol. 2 (Copacabana – 1972)
- Nelson Ned, Vol. 3 (Copacabana – 1973)
- Aos Românticos do Mundo (Copacabana – 1973)
- Papai Noel Existe (Copacabana – 1973)
- Meu Ciúme (Copacabana – 1975)
- O Poder da Fé (Celestial/Copacabana – 1976)
- Nelson Ned (Copacabana – 1977)
- Meu Jeito de Amar (Copacabana – 1979)
- Perdidamente Apaixonado (Harmony/CBS – 1982)
- Caprichoso (EMI-Odeon – 1984)
- O Grande Nelson Ned (Odeon – 1986)
- Passei da Conta (EMI/Odeon – 1987)
- O Poder da Fé Vol. 2 (Copacabana – 1990)
- Enamorado (RGE – 1991)
- Penso em vocé (RGE – 1992)
- El Romantico de América (Movieplay – 1993)

=== Christian repertoire ===
==== In Portuguese ====
- O Poder da Fé Vol. 1
- O Poder da Fé Vol. 2 (Copacabana – 1990)
- Jesus Está Vivo DE SAHARIE
- Glórias A Jesus
- Jesus Está Voltando
- Jesus Te Ama
- Jesus É Vida
- Jesus Ressuscitou

==== In Spanish ====
- Jesús Está Vivo (1993)
- Jesus Te Ama
- Jesucristo Es Vida
- Mi Testimonio
- Si las flores pudieran hablar

=== Compilations ===
- O Melhor de Nelson Ned
- Dose Dupla
- Compoe e Canta Para Jesus
- Louvor e Adoração 2002
- 2 Em 1
- Warner 30 Años
- Seleçāo de Ouro (Movieplay – 1992)
- Seleçāo de Ouro – 20 sucessos (Copacabana/EMI Music – 1998)

== Videos ==
=== VHS ===
- Alabando al Rey (in Spanish)
- Alabando Al Rey – Nelson y Otros (in Spanish)
- Un Hombre Nuevo – A New Man (in Spanish)
- Desde Brasil – Nelson Ned En Dallas (in Spanish)

=== DVD ===
- Un Hombre Nuevo – New Man (in Spanish)

== Books ==
- O Melhor De Nelson Ned
- O Pequeno Gigante Da Cancao
- El Pequeño Gigante De La Canción

== See also ==
- List of best-selling Latin music artists
