= Los Cadetes de Linares =

Mexican band

- Origin: Linares, Nuevo León, Mexico
- Genre: Norteño

Los Cadetes de Linares were a Mexican norteño band famous for their corridos, traditional ballad-style songs about social causes, criminals or heroes in the northern parts of Mexico. They appeared in various classic Mexican films and made many appearances on nationally syndicated programs in Mexico and the United States.

== Formation ==
The band was formed in 1960 in Linares, Nuevo León by Homero Guerrero. The idea of the name "Cadetes" came from the fact that, as a child, Guerrero's dream was to attend a military academy. However, because of his family's financial problems, he decided to devote himself to music. He began playing a bajo sexto, singing at family parties, festivals, schools and in the main square of Linares.

In 1961, Guerrero added an accordionist, Adan Moreno. They began playing around Linares, and became known as Los Cadetes de Linares.

In 1967, Moreno left the band due to disagreements with the group. In 1968 Samuel Zapata became the group's second accordionist. Homero and Samuel made their first recordings for Discos del Valle, a record company from Houston, Texas. Their early singles included "Sácame, Sácame", "El Ranchero", "El Rogón", "Estoy Pagando", and "Quiero Que Sepas". Zapata left the group for family reasons in 1968.

In late 1968, Candelario Villareal joined as the third accordionist for the band. Homero and Candelario made local performances throughout Monterrey, Linares, and southern Texas.

The band subsequently added Lupe Tijerina. Guerrero and Tijerina made a recording in 1974 with of corrido composed by Lupe Tijerina called "Los Dos Amigos". The band subsequently began touring across Mexico and the southwestern United States, as well as places such as Chicago and Los Angeles with large Mexican communities. With the addition of Lupe Tijerina's style, the band began to find chart success. The band's hits in this era included "Dos Coronas a mi Madre", "Las Tres Tumbas", "Pueblito", "Regalo de Reyes", and "Polvo Maldito".

On February 19, 1982, Guerrero died in a car accident on the road from Monterrey to Reynosa. His funeral was attended by thousands of people.

== Later years ==
After Guerrero's death, Rosendo Cantu took his place in the group. Lupe Tijerina had success with Los Cadetes de Linares in that same year with his bolero, "Adiós Amigo Del Alma". Cantu and Tijerina played sold out stadiums and appeared on Siempre en Domingo and the Johnny Canales Show.

The band broke up later on, but Cantu, seeing that Los Cadetes de Linares's contract had ended with Ramex Records, applied and bought the legal rights to perform as the authentic Cadetes de Linares, instead of Tijerina. Cantu and Tijerina both formed their own bands. Eventually, after litigation over the name at the USPTO, Ramex Records ended up owning the trademark "Los Cadetes de Linares".

Many bands subsequently formed with the name "Cadetes de Linares", to Tijerina's irritation. Tijerina died from respiratory problems shortly after performing the opening song at a concert in Ciudad Fernández, San Luis Potosí on July 5, 2016.

== Discography ==
- Los Dos Amigos (1975)
- El Rogon (1977)
- Una Lagrima y Un Recuerdo (1977)
- Tu Nombre (1978)
- Pescadores de Ensenada (1979)
- Inspiracion Norteña (1979)
- Ven A Buscarme (1980)
- Los Autenticos Cadetes de Linares (1980)
- Dos Coronas a Mi Madre (1980)
- Pistoleros Famosos (1980)
- Cazador de Asesinos (1981)
- El Hijo del Palenque (1982)
- Las Tres Tumbas (1982)
- Pueblito (1982)
- Un Abismo (1982)
- Un Viejo Amor (1982)
