= Los Humildes =

Mexican grupero band from Modesto, California

- Origin: Modesto, California
- Genre: Grupero
- Years active: 1972–present
- Label: Fama
- Past members: Rudy Flores

Los Humildes are a Mexican grupero band from Modesto, California. Their music has been a staple in the lives of many Mexicans and Mexican-Americans for many decades. They received a Grammy Award nomination for Best Mexican-American performance in 1986 for their album 13 Aniversario.
