= Wilfrido Vargas =

Dominican musician (born 1948)

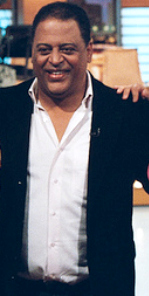
- Vargas in 2008

Background information
- Born: Wilfrido Radamés Vargas Martínez; 24 April 1949 (age 77); Altamira, Puerto Plata Province, Dominican Republic
- Genre: Merengue
- Occupations: Musician; singer; composer; arranger; trumpeter; actor
- Instruments: Vocals; trumpet; flugelhorn
- Years active: 1972–present
- Labels: Karen; Sonotone; Rodven; RCA Intl; Sony BMG

Wilfrido Radamés Vargas Martínez (Latin American Spanish pronunciation: [wilˈfɾiðo ˈβaɾɣas]; born 24 April 1949) is a Dominican musician, composer, arranger and band leader. He was instrumental in making the merengue style a worldwide phenomenon.

He was surrounded by musical influences; namely, his father Ramón, an accordionist and guitarist, and his mother Bienvenida, a flute player and guitarist. Vargas began his musical studies early, attending the Municipal Academy of Music beginning at age 10.

== Career ==
=== 1970s ===
He began his career with the band Wilfrido Vargas y sus Beduinos by recording his first album in 1972. In 1976, Vargas and his band, Wilfrido Vargas y Sus Beduinos, performed at the Madison Square Garden alongside Los Hijos del Rey. In 1978, he released the song El Barbarazo which helped catapult his popularity in Latin America. It was also his first international hit. Alongside many Latin music artists, he performed during the 1979 music festival Havana Jam with the Fania All-Stars.

=== 1980s ===
During the 1980s, he formed and directed many successful merengue groups including Las Chicas Del Can, The New York Band and Altamira Banda Show. He had international commercial success with songs such as "El Jardinero", "La Medicina", "El Africano" and "El Loco y La Luna". Vargas appeared in the 1989 film "Que viva el merengue y la lambada".

=== 1990s ===
He was nominated in 1991 for the 33rd Grammy Awards in the Best Tropical Latin Performance for his album Animation. He won a "Gaviota de Plata" (Silver Seagull) in the 1992 Viña del Mar International Song Festival. In 1993, he was decorated by the Dominican president Joaquín Balaguer with the Order of Christopher Columbus in the Knight grade, alongside fellow Dominican musicians Jorge Taveras, Manuel Tejada and Julio Gautreaux for their contribution to the development and dissemination of the national music.

The song "El Africano" from his 1983 album "El Funcionario" was the basis for the 1991 hit single, "Mami El Negro" by Cuban-American rapper DJ Laz.

For the telenovela Bellísima, Wilfrido performed the theme song, "Amor Casual" and also performed the song "Que Será" for the 1997 film Out to Sea.

=== 2000s ===
In 2003 he acted in the drama film"Exito por intercambio".

Vargas participated in 2007 at the Colombian version of The X Factor, as the groups mentor.

Today Vargas is one of the best-known artists in Latin America with hit songs such as "El Africano" (written by Calixto Ochoa), "Abusadora", "Comején", "A Mover la Colita", "El Baile del Perrito" and "Volveré".

As of 2010, he lives in Colombia.

== Discography ==
Title	Year	Chart
Title	Year	Tropical Songs
Wilfrido Vargas y sus Beduinos	1973	-
El semáforo	1974	-
Merengues instrumentales	1974	-
El jarro pichao	1975	-
En el Madison Square Garden	1976	-
¡Por el Campeonato Mundial!	1977	-
Haciendo historia	1979	-
¡Punto y aparte!	1978	-
Internacional	1979	-
Evolución	1979	-
El jeque	1980	-
Abusadora	1981	-
Wilfrido Vargas & Sandy Reyes	1982	-
El Funcionario	1983	-
El Jardinero	1984	3
El Africano	1984	-
La Medicina	1985	2
Vida, Canción y Suerte	1986	17
La Música	1987	4
El Baile	1987	2
Más Que Un Loco	1988	9
Animation	1989	9
Éxitos de	1990	9
Siempre Wilfrido	1990	5
Amor Casual	1991	-
Itinerario	1992	5
Usted Se Queda Aquí	1994	-
El Extraterrestre	1995	-
Wilfrido Vargas y Sus Consentidas	1996	-
Hoy	1997	-
Raíces	1998	-
www.wilfrido-vargas.com	2000	-
Dos Generaciones	2002	-
El Único	2002	-
Serie platino	2000	-
Serie 2000	2000	-
10 éxitos de oro	2000	-
16 éxitos	2000	-
16 éxitos 2	2001	-
Oro de Oro	2001	-
Dos generaciones	2002	-
El único	2002	-
Juntos	2002	-
Colección diamante	2003	-
Raíces 2	2004	-
Grandes éxitos	2005	-
2 grandes voces del merengue	2007	-
15 éxitos	2008	-
Los 30 mejores éxitos	2012	-
Los Mejor 40 Grandes	2012	-
Lo Mejor De Mi...	2013	-
Éxitos y Mucho Más	2014	-
Merengue Mix 2	2015	-
60 y algo Más	2015	-
Mi Historia 1	2016	-
Mi Historia 2	2016	-
La Música Vol, 2	2017	-
Albums that did not chart are denoted with an "—".

=== Grammy Nomination ===
- Best Tropical Latin Performance – Animation (1990)

== Filmography ==
Film
Year	Film	Role
1989	Que Viva el Merengue y la Lambada	Himself
2003	Éxito Por Intercambio	Himself
