= Tejano Roots Hall of Fame =

Hall of fame for Tejano performers

- Country: United States
- First award: 2000
- Final award: 2022
- Website: www.tshaonline.org

The Tejano Roots Hall of Fame (TRHF) was created in August 2000 by Rito Silva in Alice, Texas. The Texas Legislature proclaimed the city of Alice as the birthplace of Tejano music, and opened the Tejano Roots Hall of Fame and Museum in Alice. The museum exhibits costumes, photographs, and other memorabilia donated by inductees. The 1997 Grammy Awards statue given to La Mafia is included in the museum as well as the accordion La Mafia member Armando Lichtenberger used during his group's tour in Mexico. The inaugural ceremony inducted 14 musicians all from San Antonio, Texas, the number increased to over 80 individuals in recent years.

== Inductees of the Tejano Roots Hall of Fame ==
Key
†	Indicates posthumous induction

Year	Inductee	Ref.
2000	La Mafia	
2000	Beto Villa	
2000	Laura Canales	
2000	Juan Hinojosa	
2000	Tony De La Rosa	
2000	Leopoldo Luna	
2001	Carmen y Laura	
2001	Rodolfo y Lalo	
2001	Armando Pena	
2001	Johnny Herrera	
2001	Selena †	
2001	Isidro Lopez	
2001	Arnaldo Ramirez, Sr.	
2001	Rene y Rene	
2001	Valerio Longoria	
2001	Ruben Vela	
2001	Little Joe (of Little Joe y la Familia)	
2001	Rocky Hernandez (of Little Joe y la Familia)	
2001	Johnny Hernandez (of Little Joe y la Familia)	
2001	Paulino Bernal	
2001	Eloy Bernal	
2001	Manuel Solis	
2001	Chacha Jimenez (of Conjunto Bernal)	
2002	Rene Joslin	
2002	Las Hermanitas Gongora	
2002	Freddie Martinez	
2002	Daniel Garzes	
2002	Lydia Mendoza	
2002	Manny Guerra	
2002	Delia Guiterrez	
2002	Ventura Alonzo	
2002	Eligio Escobar	
2002	Juan Guerrero	
2002	Oscar Martinez	
2002	Paula Willis-Estrada	
2002	Los Unicos	
2002	Ruben Ramos	
2002	Alfonso Ramos	
2002	Tony "Ham" Guerrero	
2003	Wally Alendarez	
2003	Carlos Cadenas	
2003	Gaston Ponce Castellanos	
2003	Linda Escobar	
2003	Roland Garcia	
2003	Jimmy Gonzalez (of Mazz)	
2003	Jesus "Crazy Chuy" Hernandez	
2003	Lorenzo Hernandez	
2003	Esteban Jordan	
2003	Latin Breed	
2003	Beatriz Llamaz	
2003	Joe Lopez (of Mazz)	
2003	Joe Lozano	
2003	Los Chachos	
2003	Roberto Pulido	
2003	Mingo Saldivar	
2004	Raul Hernandez	
2004	Humberto Lozano Lopez	
2004	Issac Figueroa	
2004	Chelo Silva†	
2004	Jose Luis Rodriguez†	
2004	Rudy T. Gonzalez	
2004	Joe Bravo	
2004	Chris Sandoval	
2004	Carlos Landin	
2004	Augustin Ramirez	
2004	Bob Gallarza	
2004	Oscar Hernandez	
2004	Beto Salinas	
2004	Isidro "Lefty" Lopez†	
2004	Pedro Ayala	
2004	Las Hermanitas Cantu	
2005	Manuel Alvarez	
2005	Marcelo Garcia	
2005	Jessy Serrata (of Los Buenos Hermanos Serrata)	
2005	Rene Serrata (of Los Buenos Hermanos Serrata)	
2005	Alfredo Velasquez	
2005	Maria Elena Velasquez	
2005	Juan Colorado	
2005	Ramiro Sanchez	
2005	Al "Chato" Chavarria	
2005	Juan Perez	
2005	Cecilio Garza	
2005	David Lee (of Los Kasinos)	
2006	George Ramos Cantu	
2007	Shelly Lares	
2008	Leo Saenz (of Latin Express Band)	
2008	Carlos Saenz (of Latin Express Band)	
2011	Elsa Garcia	
2014	Patsy Torres	
2022	Cindy Ramos	
2022	Albert Soliz	
2022	Carlos Guerra	
2022	Ricky Ruiz	
2022	Joe Castillo	

== Son of Alice Award ==
Year	Inductee	Ref.
2001	Chano Cadena	
2002	Miguel Rios	
2004	Ysidro "Lolo" Cavazos	
2005	Roman "Mac" Bernal	

== Lifetime Achievement Award ==
Year	Inductee	Ref.
2004	Johnny Gonzales	

== See also ==
- List of halls and walks of fame

== Works cited ==
- "Meet Elsa Garcia, TTMA Lifetime Achievement Awardee". Voyagehouston.com.
- "Shelly Lares opens up about friendship with Selena in television interview". KSAB.com.
- "UIW celebrates Fall 2014 Commencement". Word.org.
- "Latin Express Awards". Latinexpressband.com.
- "Alice Mayor Pro-Tem Wins Leadership Award". Corpus Christi Caller-Times. September 19, 2000 – via Newspapers.com.
- "TAHP News May 2002". Tejanoahp.org.
- Beltran, Jacob (4 August 2014). "'Humble' Cantu a Tejano Hall of Famer". mySA.com.
- Burr, Ramiro (June 7, 2001). "Tejano Hall of Fame to Induct Stars". Corpus Christi Caller-Times – via Newspapers.com.
- Brown, Jeremy (July 23, 2002). "Luna". Corpus Christi Caller-Times – via Newspapers.com.
- Haag, Yvonne (May 17, 2005). "Tejano Roots Nominees Announced". Corpus Christi Caller-Times – via Newspapers.com.
- Hinojosa, Cassandra (August 28, 2003). "2003 Inductees of Tejano Roots Hall of Fame". Corpus Christi Caller-Times – via Newspapers.com.
- Hinojosa, Cassandra (November 18, 2004). "2004 Inductees of Tejano Roots Hall of Fame". Corpus Christi Caller-Times – via Newspapers.com.
- Moreno, Mary (August 4, 2002). "Hall of Fame Inductees". Corpus Christi Caller-Times – via Newspapers.com.
- Naylor, June (March 25, 2001). "Tracing Tejano's Roots". Fort Worth Star-Telegram – via Newspapers.com.
- Trevino, Cecilia (16 January 2022). "Five Laredoans inducted into Tejano Roots Hall of Fame". Laredo Morning Times.
