= Lisa Lopez =

- Genre: Pop
- Occupations: Singer, musician

Lisa Lopez is a Tejano music singer who had a United States Billboard Regional Mexican Airplay number one single with "Si Quieres Verme Llorar" (1981) on the Hacienda Record label and produced by Rick Garcia. Lopez's core audience was Mexicans, and she became the first female Tejano singer to appear on the Billboard Top Latin Albums chart in October 1981. Historically, female musicians were commercially less successful than male performers. Lopez became a successful female Tejano singer before the genre's 1990s golden age and was among seven female singers who became popular artists, including Chavela Ortiz, Patsy Torres, Laura Canales, Shelly Lares, Elsa García, and Selena.

Lopez is the niece of Isidro Lopez and was musically similar to Lydia Mendoza and Chelo Silva. She signed a recording contract with Sony Discos in the early 1990s, though her recordings failed to impact any music chart. Lopez won the first Tejano Music Award for Female Vocalist of the Year, Tejano Music Award for Female Entertainer of the Year, and won in 1982 the Tejano Music Award for Song of the Year.

== Notes ==
- San Miguel, Guadalupe (2002). Tejano Proud: Tex-Mex Music in the Twentieth Century. Texas A&M University Press. ISBN 1585441880. - Read online, registration required
