= Patsy Torres =

American musician (born 1957)

- Born: 1957 (age 68–69); San Antonio, Texas, U.S.
- Genres: Tejano music; country
- Occupation: Singer
- Instrument: Trumpet
- Years active: 1980–present
- Labels: Freddie; Cara; Joey
- Website: patsytorres.com

Patricia Donita Torres (born 1957) is an American singer of Tejano music. Known for her vocal versatility, she has been referred to as the "princess of Tejano music" by The Monitor. Torres began her musical career as a trumpet player for Blue Harmony. The band was discovered by Albert Esquivel in 1980, after which they released their debut album with production handled by Manny Guerra. In 1982, Torres formed the Patsy Torres Band and signed with Bob Grever's Cara Records. After obtaining a college degree in science, Torres decided to pursue a career as a pediatrician.

After indie label Freddie Records expressed interest in signing Torres and she had signed a three-year promotional contract with Budweiser, Torres decided to continue her musical career. Her ranchera single "Ya Me Voy de Esta Tierra", an original 1947 mariachi, became the first number-one single of her career which elevated Torres into a regional successful singer. Torres became the first female Tejano singer to provide audiences with dance routines and costume changes during her concerts. This led her to win the Tejano Music Award for Female Entertainer of the Year at the 1987 Tejano Music Awards. Torres was named by Billboard magazine as the top female Tejano singer of 1989.

Torres became an activist after her best friend died of a cocaine overdose in 1989. She campaigned in high schools across the United States, warning children of the dangers of doing drugs, affiliating with gangs, and teen pregnancy. In 1990, the singer signed with WEA Latina and became the leading female Tejano country music singer. Torres was the first Tejano singer to sing a bilingual song on The Nashville Network and has been described as "one of the most impressive female Tejano artists" of her generation. During the height of Tejano music's popularity in 1994, Torres was considered a pioneer who helped expand the genre's prosperity. In 1996, Torres won the Songwriter Award at the BMI Latin Awards. The singer received doctorates in education and organizational leadership in 2011 at the University of Incarnate Word. She has been inducted into the Tejano Roots Hall of Fame and the Women's Hall of Fame in San Antonio.

== Career ==
=== Early life and career beginnings (1957–1982) ===
Patricia Donita Torres was born in San Antonio, Texas to Williado and Patricia Torres. The family lived in a poor barrio of San Antonio. Her role model was her grandfather, William Torres, whom she hoped to emulate by becoming a physician. Seeing her little sister — who played the saxophone — get out of class on various occasions because she was in the school band, she took up the trumpet. Torres joined the school's band as their trumpet player and then formed a group with her sister called Blue Harmony. {Wellington |2013 |p=26} She graduated from Thomas Jefferson High School She played the trumpet while someone else sang. Torres continued Blue Harmony with the hopes of raising enough money to attend college and become a pediatrician. Though the members changed after graduation, the Blue Harmony band survived and started playing for money. But the trumpeter was told that the new keyboard the group had acquired made the horns obsolete and that she could stay only if she could sing. So she did. “And six months later I was discovered,” she says. “ We were performing at a wedding, and I sang just one song, the only one I knew, but this record producer who heard me didn't know that. He took us into the studio, and we won a recording contract.” {Wellington |2013 |p=26} The record producer was Albert Esquivel, who signed Blue Harmony in 1980. The group recorded their first album with production handled by Manny Guerra. Torres was also influenced by Laura Canales, who was instrumental in providing opportunities for women participation in Tejano music. The two eventually toured together and formed a bond, with Canales jokingly referring to Torres as the "Chicana Madonna" because of her costume designs.The single "Mi Casa Esta Vacia" provided Blue Harmony with moderate success. In 1982, the group disbanded and Torres formed the Patsy Torres Band.

=== Music career success (1983–1991) ===
Torres signed with Bob Grever's Cara Records in San Antonio. The 1984 single "Lowrider"/"Novela" helped establish Torres within the realm of Tejano music. She signed a three-year contract with Budwiser. In 1986, Torres received her college degree in science and planned on quitting music in favor of practicing medicine. After Freddie Records expressed interest in signing Torres to their label, she decided to stay recording music. She subsequently released her second album La Nueva Voz (1985), which included the ranchera track "Ya Me Voy de Esta Tierra", a 1947 mariachi written by her grandfather. It provided Torres with her first number-one single, becoming a regional success for the band. The band included Joe Martinez on drums, Rick Ramirez on keyboards, and Brian "Red" Moore on bass guitar. During her concerts, Torres's setlist included the singer's Tejano recordings and covers of hard rock songs. Since the inception of the Tejano Music Awards in 1981, Torres has been nominated for Female Vocalist of the Year and Female Entertainer of the Year. She attended San Antonio's inaugural New Year's Celebration in 1986. The singer produced her own music video for MTV and VH1, and became the first Tejano artist to film a music video. Known for her vocal versatility, she has been referred to as the "princess of Tejano music" by The Monitor.

Torres utilized the entire stage and provided dance performances during her concerts, the first female Tejano performer to do so. Unlike her predecessors such as Canales, Lisa Lopez, and Elsa Garcia, Torres provided those in attendance with dance routines and costume changes throughout her performance. Torres was influenced by rock musicians Pat Benatar, Heart, and Chrissie Hynde and provided 1980s-style visual aesthetics to her performances. This led her to win Female Entertainer of the Year at the 1987 Tejano Music Awards. During this time, Tejano music entered its golden age, and Torres helped define the era along with Canales, Little Joe y la Familia, Mazz, La Mafia, Emilio Navaira, and Selena. During the genre's golden age, Torres produced regional hits with her singles In 1989, Torres's single "Enamorado" was the eighth most-played song in Chicago. Billboard named Torres as the top female Tejano singer of 1989. She was named Female Vocalist of the Year at the first Tejano Vida magazine awards in Austin, Texas in 1989. Torres performed at Air Force bases in the Pacific as part of a Defense Department tour in 1989. She performed in Hawaii, Japan, Korea, the Philippines, and Guam, as part of the tour. The singer's single "Amor Con Amor" was the ninth most-played song on Tejano radio stations in Texas for two consecutive weeks, beginning on the week ending September 26, 1991.

=== Advocacy and The Positive Force Tour (1990–1994) ===
Beginning in the early 1990s, Torres became an outspoken supporter of anti-drug abuse and stay-in-school campaigns. After her best friend overdosed on cocaine in 1989, she included in her message to children to be advocates for their friends and encouraged them to act, commenting: "I rather have an ex-friend than a dead friend." The singer's Positive Force Tour campaigned in high schools across the United States. Torres tells children that her most significant accomplishment was getting a college education during her music career while maintaining her morals. The Positive Force Tour included mini skits, participation, and dramatized scenarios of where gang membership, violence, teen pregnancy, and abusing drugs can lead children in life. Torres spoke out against prejudices towards AIDS patients and spoke to students about the dangers of joining gangs. In 1989, she headlined a concert at the Austin Opera House with Little Joe y la Familia that provided books and other school supplies for underprivileged students as part of the Teach the Children campaign. She credits her family values that provided Torres with a "healthy attitude and strong faith" that enabled her to obtain her life goals. The singer has inspired her fans to continue their education and has received gang-affiliated bandanas from those who quit being gang members due to Torres's influence. An entertainment critic called her "not just another female singer", while another in The Waco Citizen called her "perky [and] vivacious". Torres became the first Tejano singer to appear in three different national shows, including a television special at SeaWorld, International Star Search, and Nashville Now all in 1990. That same year, Torres enrolled in University of the Incarnate Word, where she took up a communications arts degree. In 1992, she toured in Germany, Turkey, Italy, Greece, and Spain for a month and a half.

In 1990, Torres signed with WEA Latina for a three-year contract. Her debut album with them was titled Amor Con Amour Se Paga (1991). By 1991, she was the leading female Tejano country singer. Performed for upwards of 60,000 attendees, Torres was described by Texan newspaper The Monitor as "one of the most important Tejano female singers" of her generation in 1981. She performed on the Johnny Canales Show in 1991. The singer also became the first Tejano artist to perform a bilingual country song on The Nashville Network. Torres was featured on Vista magazine's "What's Hot in Texas" for 1991. In 1992, she was named "one of the most impressive female Tejano artists" of her generation. Torres is considered a "hero" and role model in her hometown of San Antonio during her advocacy. In 1993, she released her sixth studio album Con Todo El Corazon, with a mixture of ballads, polkas, and cumbias. Considered a pioneer in Tejano music, the singer helped the "Tejano wave" in 1994 with her "crowd-pleasing concerts".

=== Decline of Tejano music (1995–present) ===
Following the shooting death of Selena on March 31, 1995, the Tejano music market suffered and its popularity waned. Radio stations in the US that played Tejano music switched to regional Mexican music, and by 1997, KQQK was the only radio station playing non-stop Tejano music. The music video for "Te Juro" was released in December 1995 through Balboa Records, while the song was chosen by the San Antonio Tourist Bureau as a representative of the "sounds of the city". Torres was awarded as one of BMI's Songwriters at their Latin Awards in 1996. In 1996, Torres signed with indie label Joey Records and released Bien Cuidada. Latin Style magazine described her as "the sound of the future" in 1998. Torres was named the Latin Woman in Action in the Arts by La Prensa de San Antonio and was inducted into the Women's Hall of Fame in San Antonio. In October 2000, she became a spokesperson for the campaign "Get a Mammogram, Mi Amiga", sponsored by Sprint Corporation with the backing of the Susan G. Komen Foundation urging Hispanic women to get a mammogram during Breast Cancer Awareness Month. In 2014, Torres received the Alumna of Distinction for Professional Achievement at the University of the Incarnate Word, where she received her doctorates in education and organizational leadership in 2011. She served as an honorary board member for the American Cancer Society, the Latin Girl Scouts of America, and San Antonio College. The singer also served as chairperson of the American Red Cross.

Torres became the first female Tejano singer to have her compositions scored for an orchestra and perform with symphonies. Since 2014, Torres has been awarded the LULAC National Presidential Citation, Texas War on Drugs Leadership Award, the National Tejano Conference Community Award, the TAMACC Women of Distinction Award, and has been inducted into the Tejano Roots Hall of Fame. At the 2015 Tejano Music Awards, Torres performed "Dreaming of You" as part of a tribute segment for Selena, saying: "I can't believe it's been 20 years since I lost my friend, but I know Selena still lives in her music, hearts and minds of her fans, and still inspires a whole new generation to continue to dream." That same year, Torres received the Lifetime Achievement Award from the Mariachi Corazón "for her community work and dedication to the arts in San Antonio". In 2021, Torres was invited to participate in Genyva's collaborative project featuring the women in Tejano music. Genyva decided to release a Latin Christian album, with the lead single "[bringing unity amongst women [in Tejano music]", showcasing the unity of the women in the genre. In 2022, Torres released "Dedicada a Ti", a Spanish-language version of "Hopelessly Devoted to You" (1978) by Olivia Newton-John. Torres originally recorded the song for her Mi Inspiracion (2013), and decided to release the song as a single as a tribute to Newton-John following the announcement of her death.

== Personal life ==
On April 19, 1988, Torres married singer-songwriter David Lucero. Her single "Te Juro" was written for Lucero in 1994; Torres wrote the song "to assure him that he was my one and only". In 2014, Lucero was arrested during a prostitution sting conducted by the San Antonio Police Department. Lucero was charged with soliciting an undercover police officer for sex. Torres refused to comment on her husband's arrest when prompted. At the time, Lucero was the events services manager at the Alamodome in San Antonio. Torres is a Catholic and released her Christian-themed album Saved at Last (2012) after a fundraiser for St. Mary's Catholic Church. She has said in an interview that she is proud to be part of "Tejanos for Christ". The singer has belief in strong family values, which she believes strengthens any foundation. Considered one of the instrumental musicians who helped spearhead Tejano music's golden age, Torres considers her activism with children as one of the best accomplishments of her life.

== Discography ==
- Patsy Torres (1985)
- Abrazame (1987)
- El Amor Contigo (1988)
- Romantica (1990)
- Amor Con Amor Se Paga (1991)
- Con Todo El Corazon (1993)
- Patsy Torres Y Su Grupo (1994)
- Bien Cuidada (1996)
- ...Bien Protegida (1997)
- Trenzas (1999)
- Positive Force Tour (Live) (2002)
- Saved at Last (2012)
- Mi Inspiracion (2013)
- I've Got that Christmas Spirit (2018)
- Dame Tu Corazon (2020)

== See also ==
- List of Hispanic and Latino Americans
- Music of Texas

== Works cited ==
- Medina, John Henry (August 24, 2022). "Patsy Torres tributes Olivia Newton-John with 'Dedicada a Ti,' Tejano version of 'Hopelessly Devoted To You'". Tejano Nation.
- "Entertainer of the Year". El Paso Times. March 5, 1988 – via Newspapers.com.
- "Saturday Events". Austin American Statesman. June 22, 1989 – via Newspapers.com.
- "Tejano, Conjunto Artists Honored". Austin American Statesman. November 23, 1989 – via Newspapers.com.
- "Television & Radio". El Nuevo Herald. January 11, 1990 – via Newspapers.com.
- "True to her Roots". The Monitor. February 11, 1990 – via Newspapers.com.
- "Patsy Torres Appears for September 16 Fest Dance". Carlsbad Current-Argus. September 4, 1991 – via Newspapers.com.
- "For the Record > September 26, 1991". Austin American-Statesman. September 26, 1991 – via Newspapers.com.
- "For the Record > October 3, 1991". Austin American-Statesman. October 3, 1991 – via Newspapers.com.
- "Summer Sizzlers '92". New Braunfels Herald-Zeitung. July 26, 1992 – via Newspapers.com.
- "Tejano Wave". El Paso Times. January 1, 1995 – via Newspapers.com.
- "Patsy Torres to Heat Up SAMA July 26". The Seguin Gazette-Enterprise. July 25, 1997 – via Newspapers.com.
- "Official 35th Tejano Music Awards 2015 Highlights". YouTube. October 30, 2015.
- "Patsy Torres En Concerito El Vienes en el Afiteatro". Del Rio News-Herald (in Spanish). August 11, 1998 – via Newspapers.com.
- "Tejano Singer Patsy Torres Has Special Message for Parents at Binational Conference on Families". The Monitor. October 24, 2004 – via Newspapers.com.
- "Dr. Patsy Torres Lucero, BA '03, MED '05, PhD '11". Alumniandfriends.uiw.edu. 2014.
- Alba, Lori (November 10, 2015). "Patsy Torres receives Lifetime Achievement Award from Mariachi Corazón De San Antonio". Tejano Nation.
- Bennett, Steve (August 26, 1988). "Musical Entertainers Announced for HOT Festival". The Waco Citizen – via Newspapers.com.
- Burr, Ramiro (July 6, 1986). "Has Her Tejano/Rock Blend Held Patsy Torres From Major Stardom?". The Monitor – via Newspapers.com.
- Burr, Ramiro (March 23, 1987). "La Mafia Wins Tejano Music Awards". El Paso Times – via Newspapers.com.
- Burr, Ramiro (May 18, 1996). "Pete Astudillo Leads BMI Latin Awards". Billboard. Vol. 108, no. 20. p. 124.
- Cabrera, Rene (November 1, 1996). "Salgado, Torres, Amanecer at the Rose". Corops Christi Caller-Times – via Newspapers.com.
- Cooper, Becky (October 12, 1995). "Torres Concert Energizes Students". The Victoria Advocate – via Newspapers.com.
- Crunch, Susan (October 2, 2000). "Company Urges Mammograms". El Paso Times – via Newspapers.com.
- Ferman, Mitchell (July 30, 2014). "City employee arrested during prostitution sting is Tejano star's husband". Chron.com.
- Garcia, Gus (January 26, 1994). "Tejano Leading Lady Arrives for Free Concert". Del Rio News Herald – via Newspapers.com.
- Gonzalez, Maria Cortes (September 16, 1994). "For Singer Patsy Torres, No Regrets to Remember". El Paso Times – via Newspapers.com.
- Green, Alice (March 19, 1993). "Patsy Torres Practicing Preventive Medicine During Her Performances". The Monitor – via Newspapers.com.
- Jaklewicz, Greg (February 23, 1990). "Patsy Torres at Rumors". Abilene Report – via Newspapers.com.
- Martinez, Eduardo (June 27, 2014). "Laura Canales La Reina". The Monitor – via Newspapers.com.
- Maldonado, Vilma (May 1, 1991). "Patsy Torres". The Monitor – via Newspapers.com.
- Maldonado, Vilma (September 29, 1992). "Patsy Torres". The Monitor – via Newspapers.com.
- Medina, John Henry (April 8, 2021). "Genyva returns with 'Como Te Atreves' single and video, plans all-female collaboration". Tejano Nation.
- Ross, Paige (July 21, 2000). "Deliviering a Message Through Music". Corpus Christi Caller-Times – via Newspapers.com.
- Ruiz, Vicki L.; Korrol, Virginia Sanchez (2006). Latinas in the United States : a historical encyclopedia. Indiana University Press. p. 944. ISBN 0253111692.
- San Miguel, Guadalupe (2002). Tejano proud : Tex-Mex music in the twentieth century. Texas A & M University Press. p. 192. ISBN 1585441880. - [ Read online. Accessed on: May 11, 2022
- San Miguel, Guadalupe (2004) [March 1, 2002]. "When Tejano Ruled The Airways: The Rise and Fall of KQQK in Houston, Texas". 2002–2004: 29th, 30th, & 31st Annual Conferences Proceedings (PDF). Western Association of Schools and Colleges – via SJSU.edu.
- Saldana, Hector (September 10, 2013). "Tejano star Patsy Torres records her most personal album yet". Mysa.
- Saldana, Hector (2015). San Antonio : Our Story of 150 Years in the Alamo City. Trinity University Press. p. 528. ISBN 978-1595347565.
- Wellinghoff, Jasmina (May 23, 2013). "Patsy Torres: A Strong Voice and A Stronger Faith". San Antonio Woman. Archived from the original on June 5, 2022.
