= Óscar Martínez (musician) =

American musician (1934–2020)

Óscar “El Gallo Copeton” Martínez (January 3, 1934 – July 15, 2020) was an American musician and songwriter of Mexican descent who performed Tejano, slow rock, polkas, cumbias and English tunes. Known to Tejano Music devotees as "El Tejano Enamorado", after the title of his song which was a hit for Isidro Lopez in 1954.

== Biography ==
Martinez was born on January 3, 1934 in Corpus Christi, Texas, in a small barrio known as “Loma Rosa.” He joined the Corpus Christi-based Isidro Lopez Orchestra in 1954 and played for the group through 1956. In 1958 he formed The Oscar Martinez Band. In 1960 the band recorded “Makes No Difference” and “La Bamba” and the band's popularity exploded. In 1965, Martinez composed his big hit, “El Tejano Enamorado.” The tune was recorded by Isidro Lopez, who headed one of the top orchestras of the day, and it became a hit on Tejano radio across the state. Martinez hosted a very popular radio show in Corpus Christi on KCCT Radio, every morning, from 7:00 am to 8:00 am which was later expanded to include a 6:00 pm to 7:00 pm show every week-day. Martinez wrote many songs but is best known for his hit songs “El Tejano Enamorado” and “El Gallo Copeton.” It is said that Oscar was the first songwriter to use the word “Tejano” in a song and album. Oscar, who is still active, is also known for writing tunes with catchy lyrics, a big brassy sound and a musical career that has spanned over half a century.

=== Early life ===
Known to Tejano Music devotees as El Tejano Enamorado, Oscar Martinez was born in Corpus Christi, Texas to Eloisa and Pedro Martinez in a small barrio known as “Loma Rosa.” Oscar's mother, Eloisa, had two sisters; Goya and Ramona; two half-brothers, Manuel and Pedro Guerra; and a half-sister, Erlinda Guerra. Oscar's father, Pedro A. Martinez, worked at an oil mill in the cotton bale department. The family lived in a house at 407 Duncan Street, which was located just across the railroad tracks from the oil mill. Oscar grew up with three brothers, Joe, Johnny and Victor. He also had a half-brother, Daniel. In the area close to present Port and Agnes streets, near an oil cotton factory known to residents as “La Mantequeria,” Oscar's grandmother, Dona Santos Guitron Galindo, owned several businesses that included rental apartments, and a small grocery store, where she used a small corn graining machine to prepare and sell masa de maiz (corn dough). In those days this masa de maiz was used to make corn tortillas. In addition to masa, Oscar's grandmother hawked butter, eggs and other goods to barrio residents. She also owned cows, chickens, rabbits and goats. Oscar attended Southgate Elementary School and Driscoll Jr. High. It was there that Oscar joined the band and was assigned the tuba as his instrument. Oscar attended and graduated (1953) from Roy Miller High School where he played in the school's Buccaneer Band.

=== Musical career ===
Although Oscar did not play the trumpet in his high school band, he acquired proficiency with the instrument sufficient to lead a small local band that performed in a Corpus Christi nightspot known as El Macambo (located on Morgan and Pueblo Streets). From there the band redeployed to “Ibarra’s Place” on Port Street. It was there that the then seventeen-year-old performed with older musicians and where he first met Isidro Lopez. Lopez performed mechanic duties with his Dad during the day and played the alto sax after hours at Ibarra's Nite Club.

Oscar Martinez joined the Isidro Lopez Orchestra, then one of the most popular bands in the business in 1954, and toured with the band through 1956. After recording some ten records for Torrero Records the popularity of the Isidro Lopez Orchestra was at an all-time high. Unable to meet the band's touring demands, Oscar was forced to leave the Lopez organization in order to keep his day job at a local auto parts store. Oscar continued performing local gigs and in 1958 formed The Oscar Martinez Band. Band members included Joe Morris at trumpet; David Reyes at tenor sax; Rudy Alvarado at alto sax; Tony Arnelas, Jr. at drums; Joe Guajardo at guitar and Juan Perez at vocals. Past band members included Raul Ornelas on drums and vocals. Oscar Martinez played the trumpet. The band's first recording, “La Lumbre” (penned by Oscar Martinez) and “Llorando Por Ti” (written by Juan Perez) did well on radio, with increased bookings. Then in 1960 the band reached another plateau with the success of new recordings, “Makes No Difference” and “La Bamba.” The band's popularity was aided by Oscar Martinez's daily radio show on KCCT radio in Corpus Christi.

In 1965, Oscar wrote his big hit, “El Tejano Enamorado.” Isidro Lopez recorded the tune first, with accordion instrumentation. Then Oscar's band recorded the tune. “El Tejano Enamorado” became a massive hit all over the State of Texas. Everything seemed to be working well when tragedy struck. On Sunday, March 7, 1965, an unfortunate car accident occurred, near La Luisa and El Campo, Texas. Two young sailors in a Mustang died instantly; all the members of the band suffered bruises, broken limbs and head injuries. Oscar Martinez lost his front teeth and suffered a broken leg. It took nine months for the band to recover from the injuries sustained by its members and to return to performances. Bright and energetic Oscar Martinez is known as one of the last “pioneers of Tejano Music” and continues to live in his hometown, Corpus Christi, Texas. Oscar has written many songs but is best known for his hit songs “El Tejano Enamorado” and “El Gallo Copeton.” In addition to writing, recording and performing his music, Oscar Martinez has authored a book and creates art. And he still models the dark lenses and a pompadour hair-do that makes him a distinctive living legend. On October 26, 2010, Oscar Martinez recorded “The Corpus Christi Rose” and “Kiss me again tonight.” Currently (Sep 2012) Oscar Martinez is 78 years of age and recently performed with Larry Lange and the Lonely Knights as they staged “A Chicano Soul Revue.” This revue included several of Oscar Martinez's early compositions. The act has performed at the Josephine Theater in San Antonio, the Bob Bullock Museum in Austin, Texas and several other places. Personal Life

In 1977 Oscar started working with American National Insurance as an insurance agent. He also worked for other insurance companies for about twenty years, while continuing to pursue his career performing in bands and composing music.

In 1996, Oscar Martinez started work on a book called “Tejano Music Talk.” The book is unique in that Oscar includes sheet music and a short biography. Oscar is currently working on a second printing of this book. Honors

On March 20, 1999, Oscar Martinez was inducted into the Tejano Music Hall of Fame in San Antonio, Texas in the category of Composer. Roberto Pulido, Laura Canales, Joe Mejia, and Rogelio Rios were others honored that evening.

On August 3, 2002, Oscar Martinez was inducted into the Tejano R.O.O.T.S. Hall of Fame held in Alice, Texas. Eligio Escobar, Las Hernamitas Gongora, Juan Guerero, Los Unicos, Ruben and Alfonso Ramos, Tony “Ham” Guerrero, Lydia Mendoza, Freddie Martinez and Manny Guerra were also honored that evening.

=== Other important dates ===
• 1953—Graduate of Roy Miller High School, Corpus Christi, Texas • 1958–1985—Bandleader for The Oscar Martinez Orchestra • 1998—Inductee to the Tejano Music Hall of Fame • 2003—Inductee to The Tejano R.O.O.T.S. Hall of Fame • 2005—Author of “Tejano Music Talk” book • 2006—Listed in the Encyclopædia Britannica under American Musician and under Tejano Music • 2009–present—Featured vocalist for Larry Lange and his Lonely Knights Band • 2011—Accepted invitation for Texas Tech University to archive his sound music recordings • 2011—Tejano Music Talk book was added to the Nettie Benson Latino Collection- UT-Austin, TX • 2012—Accepted invitation to donate his papers to University of Texas-Austin, TX Nettie Benson Latino Collection • 2013-Inducted to the South Texas Music Walk of Fame- Corpus Christi, TX

=== Personal life and death ===
Martinez married Eduvina Perez and had a family that included four children: Javier, Imelda, Iris and Jaime. That marriage ended in divorce in 1984. He died on July 15, 2020, at the age of 86.
