= Ruben Naranjo =

American musician (1945–1998)

- Born: February 22, 1945; Alice, Texas, US
- Died: October 12, 1998 (aged 53) Alice, Texas, US
- Genres: Conjunto
- Occupation(s): Musician, singer
- Instrument(s): Accordion, bajo sexto, vocals
- Labels: Zarape, Freddie, Hacienda

Ruben Naranjo Sr. (February 22, 1945 – October 12, 1998) is an American conjunto accordionist.

== Biography ==
Naranjo was born February 22, 1945, in Alice, Texas, to a trucker father and eight brothers. He began playing bajo sexto at age 15, until he was invited into Chano Cadena's band as a backup accordionist in 1962. In 1972, he founded his own band, Ruben Naranjo y Los Gamblers, and by the mid-1970s, was recording for Zarape Records, which gave him success throughout the 1980s, where he also recorded for Freddie and Hacienda Records. Nicknamed "El Clark Gable Mexicano", "El Hijo del Pueblo" and "El Mero Si Senor"—for his yelling of "Si, senor" during shows—by fans, he died on October 12, 1998, aged 53, following a performance in Alice.

After his death, his son Ricky Naranjo took over Los Gamblers. Ricky Naranjo y Los Gamblers would headline Ruben Naranjo Memorial Festival in 1999, which took place in Ruben's hometown of Alice, Texas. He was inducted into the Tejano Roots Hall of Fame in 2000, and the Texas Conjunto Music Hall of Fame in 2010. His band was continued by his children and grandchildren.
