= Ideal Records =

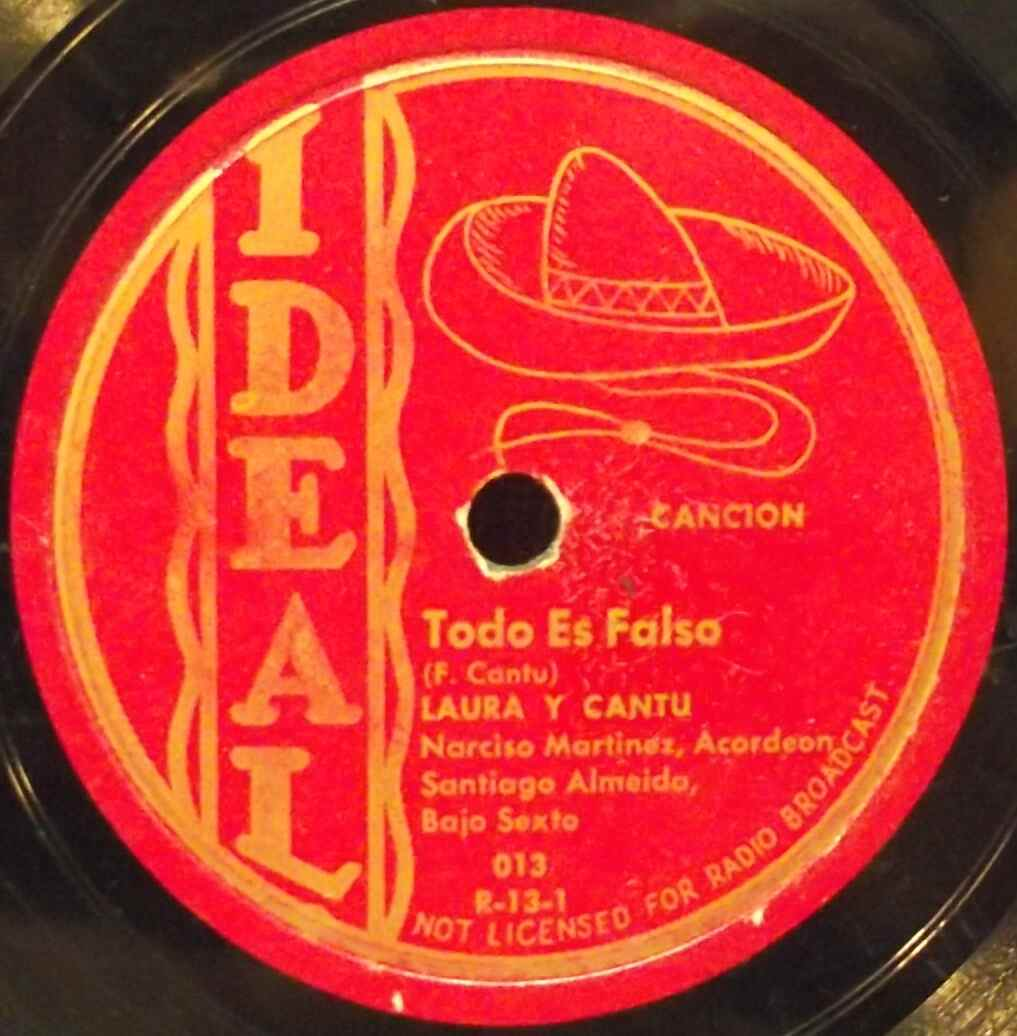
Ideal 013, 78rpm: "Todo Es Falso" by Laura y Cantu.

Ideal Records was a record label from Texas specializing in Tejano music. It became the most important record label of the genre in the 1940s and 1950s, recording tejano's most prominent artists. It declined in the early 1960s, but not before leaving an indelible mark on Tex-Mex culture.

== History ==
Ideal was founded by Paco Betancourt and Armando Marroquín in 1946, making it the first of southern Texas record labels owned by Mexican-Americans. Following the Second World War the major record labels such as RCA Victor ceased recording regional Chicano music, concentrating instead on larger "authentic" Hispanic markets in major metropolitan areas such as Mexico City. Marroquín owned a large number of jukeboxes in cantinas and other public places frequented by those of Hispanic culture. Thus, Marroquín became not only cognizant of the demand thus left un-met, but was personally suffering financially because he could not find records with the music expected by his customers. He spent less than $200 to acquire phonograph recording equipment and set up shop in his living room. His first recording was by the female duet Carmen y Laura, and this recording's 200 copies quickly sold out. Marroquín not only filled his own jukeboxes with his product, but found ready customers in other regional jukebox operators in South Texas. The label was originally only distributed from San Antonio. Marroquín made partnerships with Betancourt, who owned a music store, and the Allen Company, a record distributor from Los Angeles. Although Marroquín would significantly upgrade the quality of his recording equipment, most recording released on Ideal continued to be recorded in his living room where recording activity occurred on an almost daily basis.

By the end of the 1940s the label had become a regional powerhouse, likely the most significant Hispanic label of the American Southwest. There was little competition for Ideal's product, so every one of Ideal's early releases was a success by the label's expectations. In 1948 Ideal had its best-selling record. Narciso Martínez and Beto Villa recorded "Rosita Vals" that year, and the record sold 60,000 copies, a feat Ideal was never able to replicate. A typical press run for an Ideal record was 500 copies, plus an unknown number of record pressed for Mexican distribution. Ideal was able to pay its musicians more than some of its competitors, for instance Ideal lured Valerio Longoria from Corona Records in 1949, as it was able to pay $20 for each recording instead of $15. Between 1950 and 1956 Ideal organized numerous tours for artists Beto Villa and Carmen y Laura that enlarged the influence of tejano music not only in the Southwest, but in places such as Chicago, Kansas, and Utah. The first such trip to California initially proved to be a debacle in Los Angeles, but a last-gasp stop in the San Joaquin Valley turned into two weeks of sellout concerts.

By 1960 Ideal Records was becoming moribund, and Falcon took its place as the leader of recorded Tejano music. Ideal lost many of its artists to Falcon, as Falcon paid significantly better, and Ideal did not develop new talent. Betancourt and Marroquín dissolved their partnership, with Betancourt retaining ownership of the Ideal label and Marroquín retaining the recording studio while starting another record label, Nopal Records. The label moved from Alice to San Benito, Texas, opening new recording studios and a pressing plant there. Ideal ceased operations in 1971 when Betancourt died. Chris Strachwitz purchased all Ideal masters in 1990.

== Legacy ==
Ideal's exclusive focus on regional tejano music eventually resulted in the label recording nearly every tejano artist of note who was active during the label's existence. In the decades of the 1940s and 1950s Ideal was the clearly predominant record label for tejano music. Its output was highly influential in bringing conjuntos, female musicians, and orquestas to prominence within Tejano culture. The label's first recordings of Beto Villa were crucial in establishing the orquesta tejana as a Mexican-American tradition. Marroquín left his artists wide latitude regarding the material to be recorded, trusting the artists to know their audience. The initial audience for Ideal was the working class, but evolved to include Mexican-Americans of affluence. Ideal's location in Alice, Texas, more towards San Antonio than the Mexican border, was an ideal location to record a more sophisticated brand of tejano music called conjunto which appealed to the bilingual and educated descendants of earlier immigrants, in contrast to its main competitor Falcon, whose more rustic output was called norteña. An example of Ideal's more "sophisticated" music is Valerio Longoria, who pioneered the use of lyrics in conjunto music, as well as introducing Cuban-Mexican bolero into the conjunto tradition, and also Isidro López whose recordings for Ideal broadened the Tejano musical repertoire by fusing orquesta instruments with accordions, the addition of boleros, and "highly sophisticated" arrangements of rancheras and polkas.

Armando Marroquín had a reputation for being financially tight with his musicians, paying them as little as a $2.50 flat fee with no performance royalties. In fact, several of his musicians accused him of cheating them out of payments, a common practice among many record labels of every size and genre. However, his interest in the music he released was not only financial, but also one of belief in the cultural value of his product, as a statement against what he felt was the intellectual snobbery of the "anglos". Ideal's success can be attributed to Marroquín's familiarity with Tejano culture, and his ability to quickly adapt to musical trends within that culture.

== Production details ==
Ideal did not use matrix numbers, and catalog numbers were issued sequentially. Some titles were leased to Fony Records in Mexico. When Ideal records were made in Mexico, manufacturing took place in Monterrey by Muebles Modernos.

== Artists ==
- Conjunto Bernal
- Timotéo Cantú
- Carmen y Laura
- Lolo Cavazos
- Tony de la Rosa
- Gaytán y Cantú
- Balde González
- Delia Gutiérrez
- Santiago Jiménez Sr.
- Valerio Longoria
- Isidro López
- Narciso Martínez
- Jesus Maya
- Lydia Mendoza
- Mike Ornelas
- Hermanas Padilla
- Noe Pro
- Pedro Rocha y Lupe Martínez
- Chris Sandoval
- Chelo Silva
- Beto Villa
