= Santiago Almeida =

American musician

- Narciso Martínez and Santiago Almeida, 1936

Background information
- Born: July 25, 1911; Skidmore, Texas, U.S.
- Died: July 8, 1999 (aged 87) Sunnyside, Washington, U.S.
- Genres: Conjunto music
- Occupation: Musician
- Instrument: Bajo sexto
- Label: Bluebird

Santiago Almeida (July 25, 1911 – July 8, 1999) was a Texas musician influential in the development of the musical genres of tejano and conjunto.

== Biography ==
Almeida was born in Skidmore, Texas, and grew up on a farm. In his teens played the bajo sexto in his family's ensemble, La Orquestra Almeida. In the mid-1930s, Almeida began playing with accordionist Narciso Martínez at local dances and festivals around Brownsville, Texas, and Raymondville, Texas. Local merchant and furniture store owner Enrique Valentin heard them and persuaded recording director Eli Oberstein to record them for the Bluebird label. In 1935, Almeida and Martinez recorded a single for Bluebird Records, "La Chicharronera" b/w "El Troconal" (the former a polka and the latter a schottische). These are generally regarded as the earliest known recordings of conjunto music. The duo would record extensively for Bluebird, releasing some 60 additional singles for the label between 1935 and 1938. The pair's popularity grew as a result, and they performed extensively, both live in South Texas and on record as backing musicians for conjunto singers. In the 1940s, the pair continued to record for Ideal Records and Disco de Oro.

By the late 1940s, Almeida had amassed a large family and found his musical success more difficult to sustain. He moved to Sunnyside, Washington, in 1950, working as an apple picker and music teacher. He continued to perform locally at gatherings and in churches for the next several decades.

Almeida died July 8, 1999, in Sunnyside, Washington.

== Awards and honors ==
In 1987, his contributions to music were recognized when he was inducted into the Conjunto Hall of Fame in San Antonio. In 1993 he was awarded the Governor's Heritage Award in Washington. He was also a 1993 recipient of a National Heritage Fellowship from the National Endowment for the Arts, which is the highest honor in the folk and traditional arts in the United States. In 2005, he was inducted posthumously into the Texas Conjunto Music Hall of Fame and Museum in San Benito.
