= Carmen y Laura =

Mexican-American sister musical act

- Occupation: Singers
- Years active: 1940s-1970s
- Musical career
- Genres: Ranchera; corrido; folk; bolero; romance
- Instrument: Vocals
- Labels: 4 Star; Ideal

Carmen y Laura were a Mexican-American sister musical act who were considered a Tejano version of the Andrews Sisters. They were the first artists to record for Ideal Records.

== History ==
Carmen was the wife of Ideal Records founder Armando Marroquín. Carmen Hernandez (1921–2010) was born in Kingsville, Texas. Laura Hernandez Cantú (1926–2004) was also born in Kingsville, and would attend school in Mexico.

Carmen and Laura learned to harmonize while doing chores at home. They would often be working in separate rooms when singing together, and as a result they learned to listen to each other carefully. Their style was highly influenced by the Mexican zarzuela.

Carmen married record producer Armando Marroquín, who later founded Ideal Records, on November 20, 1936. Carmen had no plans to become a professional musician until her husband decided to make his own records to supply substantial juke box operations. Their first hit and most popular recording was "Se Me Fue Mi Amor", which appeared on 4 Star Records. Carmen y Laura's first recordings for Ideal were made with Narciso Martínez as accompanist. Recorded in the Marroquín's living room with blankets arranged on the walls for acoustic properties, this record had a press run of 200 copies, which quickly sold out and helped establish Ideal Records. Although primarily Spanish-language artists, they also recorded in English as well, the first of which was a version of "Who's Sorry Now?". The duo went on to record hundreds of songs for Ideal. They were most popular in the American Southwest, Illinois, Kansas, and also Monterrey. This duet was a pioneer in introducing swing and blues influences into Tejano music, as well as being among the first to advance a female perspective in that genre. On these tours, their performances would last for up to four hours when singing for dances. Carmen y Laura toured and recorded into the 1970s.

Carmen was the more outgoing of the two, as Laura would generally avoid interviews and direct attention to her sister. Both Carmen and Laura lived in Alice, Texas for most of their adult lives. Both sisters died in that town, and are buried there.

== Style and influence ==
Carmen y Laura were often backed by orchestras instead of accordion-based conjuntos, as their music was aimed at the Tejano middle class and not the migrant working class. These orchestras included those of Paulino Bernal, Pedro Bugarin and Beto Villa. Additionally their music was popular in Mexico, making them among the few Tejano women duos earning that distinction.

The group was highly influential in the Texas Chicano music scene, not only introducing the female duet to Tejano music, but causing it to become "fashionable". Carmen y Laura have been honored by the Tejano Cunjunto Hall of Fame in San Antonio, Texas Music Hall of Fame in Austin, the Tejano Roots Hall of Fame in Alice, and by Smithsonian's Folkways Records. Their music is heard in the 1996 film Lone Star.
