= 16 de Septiembre =

Studio album by Little Joe
- Released: 1991
- Genre: Tejano
- Length: 39:49
- Label: Sony

Little Joe chronology
Tu Amigo (1990)	16 de Septiembre (1991)	Para la Gente (1991)

16 de Septiembre is a studio album released by American performer Little Joe and his band La Familia, named after the beginning of the Mexican War of Independence. It was released in 1991 by Sony Music Entertainment. The album peaked at number 14 in the Billboard Regional Mexican Albums chart and earned Little Joe the Grammy Award for Best Mexican-American Performance at the 34th Grammy Awards.

== Track listing ==
1. "16 de Septiembre"
2. "Pa' Todo el Año"
3. "Tu Nueva Vida"
4. "Loco"
5. "Corrido del West"
6. "Soldado Razo"
7. "Pero Ay Yai Yai"
8. "Waltz Across Texas"
9. "Te Prometí"
10. "You Can Make It"
11. "Recuerdame"
12. "Cumpleaños de la Fran"

== Chart performance ==
Chart (1991)	Peak position
US Billboard Regional Mexican Albums	14
