= Elsa García =

Elsa García may refer to:

- Elsa García (singer), Mexican-American singer
- Elsa García (gymnast) (born 1990), Mexican gymnast
