= 34th Annual Grammy Awards =

1992 US music awards ceremony

- Date: February 25, 1992
- Location: Radio City Music Hall, New York City
- Hosted by: Whoopi Goldberg
- Most awards: Natalie Cole (3)
- Most nominations: R.E.M. (7)

Television/radio coverage
- Network: CBS

The 34th Annual Grammy Awards were held on February 25, 1992, recognizing accomplishments by musicians from the previous year (1991). Natalie Cole won the most awards (three), including Album of the Year, which made her the first black woman to win the award.

== Performers ==
Artist(s)	Song(s)
Paul Simon	"The Cool, Cool River"
Michael Bolton	"When a Man Loves a Woman"
Mariah Carey	"If It's Over"
Seal	"Crazy"
The Stars from the Commitments	"Mustang Sally"
Mary Chapin Carpenter with BeauSoleil	"Down at the Twist and Shout"
Roy Rogers & Clint Black	"Hold On Partner"
Bonnie Raitt	"I Can't Make You Love Me"
LL Cool J	"Mama Said Knock You Out"
Color Me Badd	"I Adore Mi Amor"
Boyz II Men	"Motownphilly"
Vince Gill	"Pocket Full of Gold"
Alan Jackson	"Don't Rock the Jukebox"
Aretha Franklin & Michael McDonald	"Everchanging Times"
Luther Vandross featuring Aretha Franklin	"Power of Love/Love Power"
Dave Grusin	"That Certain Feeling"
Amy Grant	"Baby Baby"
Evgeny Kissin	"Rhapsodie espagnole, S. 254" by Franz Liszt
Queensrÿche	"Silent Lucidity"
Metallica	"Enter Sandman"
Johnny Mathis	"Don't Get Around Much Anymore"
Keith Carradine with the cast of The Will Rogers Follies	"Our Favorite Son"
Natalie Cole with Nat King Cole (in footage)	"Unforgettable"

== Presenters ==
- Vanessa L. Williams & Michael Bolton - Song of the Year
- Dionne Warwick & Johnny Mathis - Record of the Year
- Kenny Rogers & Whoopi Goldberg - Album of the Year
- Andrew Strong & Robert Arkins of The Commitments - Best New Artist
- Clint Black & Roy Rogers - Best Female Country Vocal Performance
- Tanya Tucker & Chet Atkins - Best Male Country Vocal Performance
- Willie Nelson & Ringo Starr - Best Female Pop Vocal Performance
- Curtis Stigers & Jody Watley - Best Male Pop Vocal Performance
- Little Steven & Robbie Robertson - Best Metal Performance
- Henry Mancini - Best Jazz Instrumental Performance, Group
- Juan Luis Guerra & Celine Dion - Best Pop Performance by a Duo or Group with Vocals
- Boyz II Men & Color Me Badd - Best Rap Performance by a Duo or Group
- Kenny Loggins & David Crosby - Best Female & Male R&B Vocal Performance
- Lily Tomlin & Mandy Patinkin - Best Musical Show Album

== Award winners ==
- Record of the Year
  - David Foster (producer) for Unforgettable performed by Natalie Cole with Nat King Cole
  - Mutt Lange (producer) for (Everything I Do) I Do It For You performed by Bryan Adams
  - Keith Thomas (producer) for Baby Baby performed by Amy Grant
  - Scott Litt (producer) for Losing My Religion performed by R.E.M.
  - Bonnie Raitt & Don Was (producers) for Something To Talk About performed by Bonnie Raitt
- Album of the Year
  - Unforgettable... with Love by Natalie Cole (André Fischer, David Foster & Tommy LiPuma; producers)
  - Heart in Moon by Amy Grant (Brown Bannister, Michael Omartian & Keith Thomas; producers)
  - Luck Of The Draw by Bonnie Raitt (Bonnie Raitt & Don Was; producers)
  - Out Of Time by R.E.M. (Scott Litt, Bill Berry, Peter Buck, Mike Mills & Michael Stipe; producers)
  - The Rhythm Of The Saints by Paul Simon (Roy Halee & Paul Simon; producers)
- Song of the Year
  - Irving Gordon (songwriter) for Unforgettable performed by Natalie Cole with Nat King Cole
  - Bryan Adams, Michael Kamen & Mutt Lange (songwriters) for (Everything I Do) I Do It For You performed by Bryan Adams
  - Amy Grant & Keith Thomas (songwriters) for Baby Baby performed by Amy Grant
  - Bill Berry, Peter Buck, Mike Mills & Michael Stipe (songwriters) for Losing My Religion performed by R.E.M.
  - Marc Cohn (songwriter) for Walking In Memphis performed by Marc Cohn
- Best New Artist
  - Marc Cohn
  - Seal
  - Boyz II Men
  - C+C Music Factory
  - Color Me Badd

=== Alternative ===
- Best Alternative Music Album
  - R.E.M. for Out of Time

=== Blues ===
- Best Traditional Blues Album
  - B.B. King for Live at the Apollo
- Best Contemporary Blues Album
  - Buddy Guy for Damn Right, I've Got the Blues

=== Children's ===
- Best Album for Children
  - Clifford "Barney" Robertson (producer) for A Capella Kids performed by The Maranatha! Kids

=== Classical ===
- Best Orchestral Performance
  - Daniel Barenboim (conductor) & the Chicago Symphony Orchestra for Corigliano: Symphony No. 1
- Best Classical Vocal Soloist
  - Dawn Upshaw for The Girl With Orange Lips (Falla, Ravel, etc.)
- Best Opera Recording
  - Cord Garben (producer), James Levine (conductor), Hildegard Behrens, Reiner Goldberg, Matti Salminen, Hanna Schwarz, Cheryl Studer, Bernd Weikl, Ekkehard Wlaschiha, & the Metropolitan Opera Orchestra for Wagner: Götterdämmerung
- Best Performance of a Choral Work
  - Georg Solti (conductor), Margaret Hillis (choir director) & the Chicago Symphony Orchestra & Chorus for Bach: Mass in B Minor
- Best Instrumental Soloist With Orchestra
  - Leonard Slatkin (conductor), John Browning & the Saint Louis Symphony Orchestra for Barber: Piano Concerto
- Best Classical Performance Instrumental Solo Without Orchestra
  - Alicia de Larrocha for Granados: Goyescas; Allegro de Concierto; Danza Lenta
- Best Chamber Music Performance
  - Emanuel Ax, Jaime Laredo, Yo-Yo Ma & Isaac Stern for Brahms: Piano Quartets (Opp. 25 and 26)
- Best Contemporary Composition
  - John Corigliano (composer), Daniel Barenboim (conductor) & the Chicago Symphony Orchestra for Corigliano: Symphony No. 1
- Best Classical Album
  - Hans Weber (producer), Leonard Bernstein (conductor), June Anderson, Nicolai Gedda, Adolph Green, Jerry Hadley, Della Jones, Christa Ludwig, Kurt Ollmann & the London Symphony Orchestra for Bernstein: Candide

=== Comedy ===
- Best Comedy Album
  - Peter Schickele for P.D.Q. Bach: WTWP Classical Talkity-Talk Radio

=== Composing and arranging ===
- Best Instrumental Composition
  - Elton John (composer) for "Basque" performed by James Galway
- Best Song Written Specifically for a Motion Picture or Television
  - Bryan Adams, Michael Kamen & Robert John "Mutt" Lange (songwriters) for "(Everything I Do) I Do It for You" performed by Bryan Adams
- Best Instrumental Composition Written for a Motion Picture or for Television
  - John Barry (composer) for Dances With Wolves
- Best Arrangement on an Instrumental
  - Dave Grusin (arranger) for "Medley: Bess You Is My Woman/I Loves You Porgy"
- Best Instrumental Arrangement Accompanying Vocal(s)
  - Johnny Mandel (arranger) for "Unforgettable" performed by Natalie Cole with Nat King Cole

=== Country ===
- Best Country Vocal Performance, Female
  - Mary Chapin Carpenter for "Down at the Twist and Shout"
- Best Country Vocal Performance, Male
  - Garth Brooks for Ropin' the Wind
- Best Country Performance by a Duo or Group with Vocal
  - The Judds for "Love Can Build a Bridge"
- Best Country Vocal Collaboration
  - Vince Gill, Ricky Skaggs & Steve Wariner for "Restless"
- Best Country Instrumental Performance
  - Mark O'Connor for The New Nashville Cats
- Best Country Song
  - John Jarvis, Naomi Judd & Paul Overstreet (songwriters) for "Love Can Build a Bridge" performed by The Judds
- Best Bluegrass Album
  - Carl Jackson & John Starling for Spring Training

=== Folk ===
- Best Traditional Folk Album
  - Ken Burns & John Colby (producers) for The Civil War - Original Soundtrack performed by various artists
- Best Contemporary Folk Album
  - John Prine for The Missing Years

=== Gospel ===
- Best Pop Gospel Album
  - Steven Curtis Chapman for For the Sake of the Call
- Best Rock/Contemporary Gospel Album
  - Russ Taff for Under Their Influence
- Best Traditional Soul Gospel Album
  - Mighty Clouds of Joy for Pray For Me
- Best Contemporary Soul Gospel Album
  - BeBe Winans & CeCe Winans for Different Lifestyles
- Best Southern Gospel Album
  - The Gaither Vocal Band for Homecoming
- Best Gospel Album by Choir or Chorus
  - Gary Hines (choir director) for The Evolution of Gospel performed by The Sounds of Blackness

=== Historical ===
- Best Historical Album
  - Steven Lasker & Andy McKaie (producers) for Billie Holiday - The Complete Decca Recordings

=== Jazz ===
- Best Jazz Instrumental Solo
  - Stan Getz for "I Remember You"
- Best Jazz Instrumental Performance, Group
  - The Oscar Peterson Trio for Saturday Night at the Blue Note
- Best Large Jazz Ensemble Performance
  - Dizzy Gillespie for Live at the Royal Festival Hall
- Best Jazz Vocal Performance
  - Take 6 for He Is Christmas
- Best Contemporary Jazz Performance
  - The Manhattan Transfer for "Sassy"

=== Latin ===
- Best Latin Pop Album
  - Vikki Carr for Cosas del Amor
- Best Tropical Latin Album
  - Juan Luis Guerra for Bachata Rosa
- Best Mexican-American Album
  - Little Joe for 16 de Septiembre

=== Musical show ===
- Best Musical Show Album
  - Cy Coleman (producer and composer), Mike Berniker (producer), Adolph Green, Betty Comden (lyricists) & the original Broadway cast for The Will Rogers Follies

=== Music video ===
- Best Music Video, Short Form
  - Tarsem (video director) & R.E.M. for "Losing My Religion"
- Best Music Video, Long Form
  - Anthony Eaton (video producer), David Mallet, Mark "Aldo" Miceli (video directors) & Madonna for Madonna: Blond Ambition World Tour Live

=== New Age ===
- Best New Age Album
  - Chip Davis for Fresh Aire 7

=== Packaging and notes ===
- Best Album Package
  - Vartan (art director) for Billie Holiday - The Complete Decca Recordings performed by Billie Holiday
- Best Album Notes
  - Alan M. Leeds, Cliff White, Harry Weinger, James Brown & Nelson George (notes writers) for Star Time performed by James Brown

=== Polka ===
- Best Polka Album
  - Jimmy Sturr for Live at Gilley's!

=== Pop ===
- Best Pop Vocal Performance, Female
  - Bonnie Raitt for "Something to Talk About"
- Best Pop Vocal Performance, Male
  - Michael Bolton for "When a Man Loves a Woman"
- Best Pop Performance by a Duo or Group with Vocal
  - R.E.M. for "Losing My Religion"
- Best Pop Instrumental Performance
  - Michael Kamen for Robin Hood: Prince of Thieves

=== Production and engineering ===
- Best Engineered Album, Non-Classical
  - Al Schmitt, Armin Steiner, David Reitzas & Woody Woodruff (engineers) for Unforgettable... with Love performed by Natalie Cole with Nat King Cole
- Best Classical Engineered Album
  - Gregor Zielinsky (engineer), Leonard Bernstein (conductor) & the London Symphony Orchestra for Bernstein: Candide
- Producer of the Year, (Non Classical)
  - David Foster
- Classical Producer of the Year
  - James Mallinson

=== R&B ===
- Best R&B Vocal Performance, Female
  - Lisa Fischer for "How Can I Ease the Pain"
  - Patti LaBelle for Burnin'
- Best R&B Vocal Performance, Male
  - Luther Vandross for Power of Love
- Best R&B Performance by a Duo or Group with Vocal
  - Boyz II Men for Cooleyhighharmony
- Best Rhythm & Blues Song
  - Marcus Miller, Luther Vandross & Teddy Vann (songwriters) for "Power of Love/Love Power" performed by Luther Vandross

=== Rap ===
- Best Rap Solo Performance
  - LL Cool J for "Mama Said Knock You Out"
- Best Rap Performance by a Duo or Group
  - DJ Jazzy Jeff & The Fresh Prince for "Summertime"

=== Reggae ===
- Best Reggae Album
  - Shabba Ranks for As Raw as Ever

=== Rock ===
- Best Rock Vocal Performance, Solo
  - Bonnie Raitt for Luck of the Draw
- Best Rock Performance by a Duo or Group with Vocal
  - Bonnie Raitt & Delbert McClinton for Good Man, Good Woman
- Best Rock Instrumental Performance
  - Eric Johnson for "Cliffs of Dover"
- Best Hard Rock Performance with Vocal
  - Van Halen for "For Unlawful Carnal Knowledge"
- Best Metal Performance with Vocal
  - Metallica for Metallica
- Best Rock Song
  - Sting (songwriter) for "The Soul Cages"

=== Spoken ===
- Best Spoken Word or Non-musical Album
  - Ken Burns for The Civil War

=== Traditional pop ===
- Best Traditional Pop Performance
  - Natalie Cole (with Nat "King" Cole) for "Unforgettable"

=== World ===
- Best World Music Album
  - Mickey Hart for Planet Drum

== Special merit awards ==
=== MusiCares Person of the Year ===
- Bonnie Raitt

=== Grammy Legend Award ===
- Barbra Streisand

== Trivia ==
- Lisa Fischer and Patti LaBelle tied in the category of Best Female R&B Vocal Performance; therefore both won awards.
