= The Texas-Mexican Conjunto =

1985 book by Manuel H. Peña

The Texas-Mexican Conjunto: History of a Working-Class Music is a 1985 non-fiction book by Manuel H. Peña, published by University of Texas Press. It documents Tejano conjunto music established in the 20th century. The author states that the music reflects how communities on the Mexico-United States border evolved and how the communities opposed assimilating to the dominant American culture.

The author interviewed musicians and posted quotes from said interviews in his work. He used Marxist theory in creating the work.

== Reception ==
James S. Griffith of University of Arizona described the book as "useful and fascinating".
