= Zarape Records =

- Founded: 1963
- Genre: Tejano music
- Location: Dallas, Texas, U.S.

Zarape Records or El Zarape Records was a tejano music record label based in Dallas, Texas.

== History ==
Zarape Records was founded in 1963. In 1964 and 1965, it released albums (Por un amor, Amor bonito respectively) by Little Joe and the Latinaires which was the beginning of that artist's success. Johnny Gonzales was an executive at the label. Zarape was also the label responsible for El barco chiquito, which is Agustín Ramírez's most popular album. Zarape was the first label to market Tex-Mex on a national level. In the mid-1970s Zarape became the first label for "El Si Senor" Ruben Naranjo y Los Gamblers. Other artists included Joe Bravo, Johnny Canales, and The Mexican Revolution.

The label was highly influential in the La Onda movement, as it helped promote and spread Tejano music. There was a Zarape ad in the premier music trade publication, Billboard magazine, which stated, "We’re Coming Through in '72. El Zarape Records es la Onda Chicana." This announcement is among the earliest examples of the term La Onda Chicana being used in commercial advertising.
