= Tony de la Rosa =

Tejano musician

Antonio de la Rosa (October 31, 1931, in Sarita, Texas – June 2, 2004) was an influential tejano musician. He was noted for producing dynamic and harmonic accordion runs on the two-row button accordion.

De la Rosa's recording session took place in 1949 for Arco Récords of Alice, Texas. De la Rosa introduced several important innovations into conjunto music, including the practice of slowing polka tempos down to 110–115 beats per minute, as well as the use of amplified bajo sexto and bass. He was hired by Ideal Records in the early 1950s to be their staff accordionist. He left Ideal in 1955 in order to lead his own band.
