= Chulas Fronteras =

1976 documentary film by Les Blank

- Directed by: Les Blank
- Starring: Los Alegres De Teran, Flaco Jiménez, Lydia Mendoza
- Distributed by: Brazos Films
- Release date: 1976
- Running time: 58 min.
- Language: English

Chulas Fronteras is a 1976 American documentary film which tells the story of the norteño or conjunto music which is played on both sides of the Mexico–Texas border. It was directed by Les Blank. A CD soundtrack of the music played in the film is also available, under the same title.

In 1993, this film was selected for preservation in the United States National Film Registry by the Library of Congress as being "culturally, historically, or aesthetically significant".
