= Son de Rey =

- Origin: Austin, Texas, United States
- Genres: Latin Rock; World music
- Website: Official Website; Son de Rey on facebook

Son de Rey is an American Latin rock and world music band from Austin, Texas, United States. Son de Rey's Latin Alternative sound blends traditional cumbia, and Latin beats with pop electronica.

== Biography ==
In 2014, the Austin Music Awards named Son de Rey #2 Best Performing Latin Band and #4 Best Performing World Music Band.

In May, 2015, Son de Rey performed at Pachanga Latino Music Festival.

=== Ojos Azules EP and album ===
In August 2012, Son de Rey released Ojos Azules – EP produced by Grammy Winner Fabian Hernandez, noted for his work with Little Joe Y La Familia, Ruben Ramos & The Mexican Revolution, and Hamilton Loomis. The album reached the top 100 downloads in the iTunes Pop Latino Category and has consistently remained at the Top 10 in the ReverbNation Austin Latin Charts.

They were soon invited to join the top Mexican Regional and Tejano artists in a music video filming of “Somos Hermanos,” as featured on Univsion’s Primer Impacto in an effort to fight children’s hunger. Todo Austin Magazine hailed the group as “Austin’s next wave of Latin Rockers.”

They began touring across Texas, with showcases in popular music festivals including Pachanga Latino Music Festival, Pecan Street Festival, Tejano Music Awards Fan Fair, Poteet Strawberry Festival, and El Camino Real Music Festival.

During SXSW 2014 they took home 3 Austin Music Award Nominations including Best Latin Rock Act, Best Latin Traditional Act, and Best New Austin Act. Soon after, the group was ranked among the top 30 Latin Bands in Telemundo's 'Buscando Mi Ritmo' competition, which searched for the best latin groups in the US. Later that year they released the new single and video “Pray For A Lover"

During SXSW 2015 they were nominated once again for 2 Austin Music Awards including Best Latin Band and Best World Music Band. In May, 2015, Son de Rey released their first full length Album project Ojos Azules, also produced by Fabian Hernandez, with plans for a second statewide and national tour.

=== Ramírez's departure from Son de Rey ===
In December 2022 Luis Miguel Ramírez the then frontman of the group announced on social media that he had left the group to pursue the launch of his solo project. He began using the pseudonym "Miguel St. Michael" as an homage to the famed New York City Club Kid "James St. James." St. Michael began teasing new material on his blog beginning with a trailer for his upcoming single "No Soy Lorenzo"

== Discography ==
=== Singles and EPs ===
- Ojos Azules - EP (2012)
- "Pray for a Lover" - Single (2014)
- "El Amante (Versión Norteña)"

=== Albums ===
- Ojos Azules (2015)

== Current members ==
- Deborah Moreno: Female vocals
- David Moreno: Keyboard
- Eric Calistri: Guitar
- David Moreno Sr.: Bass
- Carlos De Leon: Percussion
- Laura De Leon: Percussion

== Former members ==
- Luis Miguel Ramírez : now Miguel St. Michael Male Vocals.
