= Narciso Martínez =

Mexican-American pioneer of conjunto music (1911–1992)

- Narciso Martínez

Background information
- Born: October 29, 1911; Reynosa, Mexico
- Died: June 5, 1992 (aged 80); San Benito, Texas, U.S.
- Genres: Conjunto music
- Occupations: Musician
- Instruments: Accordion
- Labels: Bluebird
- Formerly of: Santiago Almeida

Narciso Martínez (October 29, 1911 – June 5, 1992), was a Mexican folk musician. His nickname was El Huracan del Valle ("The Hurricane of the Valley"). He began recording in 1935 (or 1936) and is the father of conjunto music. The Spanish word conjunto means 'group' and in El Valle de Tejas that means accordion, bajo sexto, and contrabajo (string bass, known locally also as "el tololoche"). The same year, he and Santiago Almeida recorded their first 78 rpm record containing the polka "La Chicharronera" and the schottishche "El Tronconal" for Bluebird Records, which quickly became a success.

== Biography ==
Narciso Martínez and Santiago Almeida, 1936

Martínez was born in Reynosa, Mexico. When Martínez was an infant his family moved to La Paloma, Texas, U.S., near Brownsville where he was raised. His parents were migrant farmworkers and Martínez received no formal education. He had one brother named Santos Martínez.

In 1928, he got married and learned how to play the one-row diatonic accordion from the local German and Czech families around Bishop, Texas. Around 1930, Martínez was able to purchase a two-row button accordion. He began collaborating with bajo sexto player Santiago Almeida, receiving enthusiastic responses at dances. Local furniture store owner and talent broker Enrique Valentin heard them, gave Martínez his nickname, and persuaded recording director Eli Oberstein to record them for the Bluebird label. This established a new sound, which quickly became identifiable as Texas-Mexican conjunto music. Don Narciso, the first widely successful conjunto recording artist, made hundreds of recordings of mostly instrumental dance tunes emphasizing the melody side of the accordion and leaving the bass parts to Almeida. They played local dances and festivals around Brownsville, Texas and Raymondville, Texas. In 1937–38, Victor Records repackaged some of his recordings with translated titles for the Polish, Scandinavian and Cajun audience, issuing records under the pseudonyms "Polskie Trio", "Dragspel och Guitar" and "Louisiana Pete".

In the 1940s, Martínez purchased a now-standard three-row button accordion. During World War II, there was a lack of materials due to the war effort, so most musicians were unable to make recordings. After the war had ended, Martínez was one of the first musicians to resume recording, this time with Ideal Records, a small Mexican American label co-founded by Paco Betancourt in San Benito, Texas. In the 1950s, he joined other Mexican-Americans on the Tejano dancehall circuit, touring areas of New Mexico, Arizona and California.

Martínez is a recipient of a 1983 National Heritage Fellowship awarded by the National Endowment for the Arts, which is the United States government's highest honor in the folk and traditional arts. He died of leukemia on June 5, 1992 in San Benito, Texas.

== Legacy ==
The Narciso Martinez Cultural Arts Center, an organization dedicated to the preservation, promotion and development of the rich and cultural heritage of the Mexicano community, in San Benito, is named for him.

== Discography ==
=== Compilation ===
- Texas-Mexican Border Music, Vol. 10: Narcisco Martinez (9017 Arhoolie Folklyric, 1977)
- Narciso Martinez Vol. 2 - Father Of Tex-Mex Conjunto (LPFL9055 Arhoolie Folklyric, 1989)
- 16 Exitos de Narcizo Martinez (16 Hits of Narciso Martínez) (R y R, 1992)
- El Huracan del Valle (Arhoolie, 1997)
- The Father of Texas-Mexican Conjunto (361 Arhoolie, 2009)
- Narciso Martinez - The Complete Discos Ideal Recordings, Volume 1 (8001 Arhoolie, 2011)
- Narciso Martinez - The Complete Discos Ideal Recordings, Volume 2 (8017 Arhoolie, 2011)
