= Paulino Bernal =

American musician and Christian evangelist (1939–2022)

Paulino Bernal (June 22, 1939 – September 10, 2022) was an American accordion player and Christian evangelist. He was a member of the Tejano Tex-Mex group Conjunto Bernal.

In 1972, Paulino converted from the apostolic Christian Evangelical and founded Bernal Christian Records to evangelize his Protestant Christian beliefs. Bernal owned and operated more than a dozen Spanish Language religious radio stations in Texas, which carried a satellite-fed programming schedule through his La Nuevo Cristiana ministry. In 2008 Paulino Bernal released a new CD of polkas produced by Grammy-winning producer Armando Lichtenberger Jr., "El Maestro Del Accordion Y Sus Polkas" on Urban Records and received his first Grammy nomination for Best Polka Album for the 51st Annual Grammys.

== Early life ==
Paulino Bernal was born on June 22, 1939, in Raymondville, Texas. Paulino was raised in poverty and dropped out of school when he was in the seventh grade. An accomplished accordionist by that time, he left school "to try and earn money and get us out of the poverty in which we found ourselves." Bernal’s mother was a divorcee, and early on she moved to Kingsville, Texas, where Paulino, his older brother Eloy, the younger Luis, and three sisters picked cotton, cucumbers, and other crops to help support the family. After his mother purchased a guitar for the children, Bernal soon learned to play the cantinas with an elderly accordionist, where he picked up tips to help buy food for his family. He soon became interested in the accordion as well after listening to accordionists on the radio.

== Career ==
Los Hermanito Bernal launched their musical career in 1952. They were hired to play a dance in nearby Premont – Bernal on accordion, Eloy on bajo sexto, and a friend, Adan Lomas, on drums. According to Bernal, "a lot of people attended, and they liked the Bernal Brothers so much, they kept calling us back." They began playing in Falfurrias and Alice nearby, the home of Ideal Records. Soon the Bernal Brothers came to the attention of Armando Marroquín, the man who recorded all the artists for Ideal Records.

The Bernal Brothers were first recorded as the backup conjunto for some of the duets then popular among Texas-Mexicans, such as Carmen y Laura. In March 1955, Marroquin gave the Bernal their chance as headliners, and a 78 rpm record was released with the cancion ranchera Mujer Paseada on one side and the romantic bolero Desprecio on the other. With the release of their first record, the Bernal Brothers became one of the top conjuntos in Texas.

El Conjunto Bernal was recorded prolifically for Ideal between 1955 and 1960. Songs including Mi Unico Camino and Sentimiento Y Renco, both from late 1958, are on this CD and cassette.

Marroquin began taking them on tours throughout the southwest and beyond. They were especially popular in Arizona, where local bandleader Pedro Bugarin featured them with his orchestra. According to Bernal, he and Eloy sat in with Bugarin’s band, and some of the band musicians would in turn sit in with El Conjunto Bernal. This exposure to band music inspired Bernal to branch out of the normally simple ranchera music of the conjunto into the more sophisticated style of the Orquesta.

Around 1960, Armando Marroquin ended his relationship with Ideal Records and El Conjunto Bernal stayed with him and recorded for his new label, Nopal Records. Shortly thereafter, Conjunto Bernal relocated to McAllen, Texas, across the border from Mexico in the Lower Rio Grande Valley. Bernal began working with Victor Gonzales and the two men founded Bego Records (the company name being a combination of their two last names).

In the late 1960s, Gonzales bought out Bernal's interest in Bego Records and he went on to found Bernal Records, which also produced music by El Conjunto Bernal. By this time however, he had given up performing in favor of the administrative aspects of show business. He ran the recording company, hosted a regional TV music show, and generally concentrated on the promotional aspects of the business. Meanwhile, Oscar Hernandez and other accordionists continued the accordion-playing legacy, and Bernal began to abuse alcohol and drugs.

In 1972, Bernal converted to born-again Christianity after speaking to a cook working in his restaurant. Turning away from substance abuse, he began preaching. He also resumed his career as an accordionist, this time in the service of Christianity. Later, he started his second recording company, Bernal Christian Records.
