= Paco Betancourt =

American record producer (1903–1971)

Paco Betancourt (January 15, 1903 – September 5, 1971) was an American businessperson, record producer and mayor of San Benito, Texas.

== Biography ==
Paco Betancourt owned and operated the Rio Grande Music Co. in San Benito, Texas, which also housed the Ideal Records recording studio. The Rio Grande Music Co. was primarily a coin-operated vending company that owned and serviced jukeboxes and pinball machines. In the 1920s, Paco Betancourt owned and operated the Queen Theatre in Brownsville, Texas, which was the first theatre in the Rio Grande Valley to show talking movies. By the late 1940s and early 1950s, local music of the day—the early Tejano and conjunto music of South Texas—had become a popular genre and good business for record producers and jukebox operators. The local nightclubs, ballrooms, and bars clamored to capitalize on the popularity of the music as well as the singers, musicians, and orchestras of the day.

Paco Betancourt's Rio Grande Music Co. opened a studio where many of the recordings of the day were recorded and distributed to the local jukeboxes. Some of the engineering chores were by a gifted young local singer and musician recording for the label named Baldemar Huerta, who would soon be known to the music world as Freddy Fender. Throughout his career of 50 years, Freddy—or Balde, as he was known locally—was always public about his humble beginnings and his early history in the small South Texas town of San Benito.

Mr. Betancourt later entered politics and was elected mayor of San Benito, Texas. He died on September 5, 1971. Paco is considered to be a pioneer in the history of South Texas recorded music. He is inducted into the Texas Conjunto Music Hall of Fame and Museum in San Benito.
