= Little Joe (singer) =

American tejano musician

- Born: José María De León Hernández; October 17, 1940 (age 85); Temple, Bell County, Texas, U.S.
- Origin: Nixon, Texas, U.S.
- Genres: Chicano Soul; Onda Chicana; Tejano; norteño; country; blues
- Occupations: Singer, songwriter, record producer
- Instruments: Vocals, piano
- Years active: 1955-present
- Label: Sony

José María De León Hernández (born October 17, 1940), known professionally as Little Joe, is an American tejano performer who was born and raised in Temple, Texas.

== Career ==
Little Joe is of Mexican descent. Hernández told the Stockton Record in 2015 that he was born "in a three-wall, dirt-floor garage ... on a cold stormy night," the seventh of 13 children. His father, Salvador, was known as "La Cotorra" (the parakeet) and was a troubadour. His mother, Amelia DeLeon, was a trained pianist. "My dad and aunts all played instruments and sang," he told the Riverside Press-Enterprise (Nov. 18, 2015). "We'd go to parties that would last until three in the morning."

Hernández got his start at 13 when his cousin, David Coronado, recruited him to play guitar for his Latinaires. The Latinaires eventually became known as Little Joe and the Latinaires. Today he is usually joined by his band La Familia. (Note: Little Joe's band, La Familia, has also been called Johnny y La Familia, bearing the name of Little Joe's brother, Johnny Hernández (né Juan De León Hernández; born 1944), vocalist, producer, and recording engineer.) In 1992, their album 16 de Septiembre earned the Grammy Award for Best Mexican-American Performance. In 2008, Little Joe once again won a Grammy for Best Tejano Album of the year for Before the Next Teardrop Falls. Other Grammy nominated albums include Timeless (1988), 1993's Que Paso (1993), Little Joe y La Familia 2000 (1999), and Celebration of Life Vol.1 & Vol.2 (2003).

Hernández has said he was greatly influenced by Beto Villa, the originator of orquesta Tejana that generally features trumpets and saxophones, as opposed to conjunto, which relies on accordions. As a member of Texas' Tejano Hall of Fame, he has been entertaining audiences around the world for more than 50 years, on 70 albums and in countless shows. His style has been called Tejano, Tex-Mex, Norteno, Chicano, La Onda. Hernández told the Stockton Record in 2015 that originally, "it was just multicultural music in two languages." Hernandez, who grew up with 12 brothers and sisters as the only non-African-American family in a "totally black" neighborhood, told The Record: "All I heard every day were black artists. At home, it was country music's three 'great Hanks': "Williams, Thompson and Snow". It was always part of the atmosphere. Part of my DNA." He is known as the "King of the Brown Sound". Hernández has said he is inspired by jazz. "I love jazz," he told the Riverside Press-Enterprise. "If I could have been a jazz musician, I would have preferred that." Hernández has been known to infuse his music not only with jazz, but also country, pop and classical music. One of his most popular recorded songs, "Las Nubes", incorporates violins and other strings.

Hernandez founded the Little Joe Diabetes and Prevention organization and has organized walkathons in San Antonio.

The Temple Independent School District awarded him with the school district's first ever honorary high school diploma in October 2022. Little Joe had to leave school after 7th grade for migrant work, and all of his education after that was gained through experience. "He wasn't able to finish school because he had to go pick cotton, and literally, drive his family around at 12-13 years old", said his son, Isaac Hernandez, who is also the assistant principal at Temple High School.

== Awards and honors ==
- Hernandez is a recipient of a 2023 National Heritage Fellowship awarded by the National Endowment for the Arts, which is the United States government's highest honor in the folk and traditional arts.
