= Laura Canales =

American Tejano musician (1954–2005)

- Also known as: La Reina De La Onda Tejana
- Born: Laura Canales; August 19, 1954; Kingsville, Texas, United States
- Died: April 16, 2005 (aged 50) Corpus Christi, Texas, United States
- Genres: Tejano; Country; Latin pop; R&B
- Occupation: Singer
- Instruments: Vocals; piano
- Years active: 1973–2005
- Labels: Freddie Records; Capitol Records; EMI; Discos CBS International

Laura Canales (August 19, 1954 – April 16, 2005) was an American Tejano musician and an original inductee in the Tejano Roots Hall of Fame. Canales was born in Kingsville, Texas.

== Early years ==
Laura Canales was raised in Kingsville, Texas. She attended Henrietta M. King High School in Kingsville. After graduation, her father, Perfecto, encouraged her to continue her pursuit of a tejano music career. She made her recording debut in 1973 with Los Unicos while simultaneously singing with renowned Texas conjunto and norteño group Conjunto Bernal.

In the mid-1970s, Canales was a founding member of tejano band Snowball & Company, which also went by the name, Felicidad. The band released several full-length albums and singles under both group names on San Antonio label, Fireball Records, including a cover of the song Midnight Blue, the first regional hit of Canales' career. Snowball choose the recording engineer & producer Paul Westbrook since he was recording and producing most of the hits in the Tejano music scene in those early days. Members included Laura Canales (lead vocals), Oscar Soliz (keyboards, accordion, bass, harmonica), Miro Valdez (guitar, vocals), Juan Rodriguez (bass, vocals, accordion), and Balde Muñoz (drums, percussion). The band was managed by Oscar Muñoz.

== Success ==
In 1981, Canales married drummer Balde Muñoz and formed the group Laura Canales & Encanto. After signing with Freddie Records, the group enjoyed enormous success. The group's single, Sí Viví Contigo, was their first major hit. In 1983, Texas Governor Mark White honored her with the Yellow Rose of Texas Award, the state's highest honor for artists. From 1983 to 1986, Canales won both best female entertainer and female vocalist honors at the Tejano Music Awards, a record that stood until Selena broke it in the 1990s. In 1987, Canales did a cover of José José's Te Quiero Asi with Mazz's Joe Lopez which appeared on the band's album Beyond.

In 1989, Canales and Balde Muñoz divorced. Canales subsequently quit Encanto and went into semi-retirement. She did manage a comeback during a surge in international popularity of Tejano music during the early 1990s and made appearances with the tejano band, Los Fabulosos Cuatro. As a solo artist, this comeback yielded several well-known hits, including Cuatro Caminos, Dame La Mano, and Dile a Tu Esposa.

== Later years ==
Eventually, Laura Canales began preparing for life beyond Tejano music. Remembering a promise to her mother, she enrolled in classes at Texas A&M University-Kingsville. Canales graduated with Bachelor's degrees in Psychology and Speech Therapy in 1997. Shortly thereafter, Canales began taking graduate classes at Texas A&M University-Kingsville, working toward a master's degree in Communication Science Disorders. During her breaks from university coursework, Canales began yet another comeback by participating with the Leyendas y Raices Tour which included fellow Tejano performers Carlos Guzman, Augustin Ramirez, Sunny Ozuna, Freddie Martinez, Mario Montes, and Grupo Sierra. In 2000, Canales became part of the first class of inductees to the Tejano Roots Hall of Fame.

== Illness and death ==
It was while attending graduate school that Laura Canales first began experiencing problems with her gall bladder. After undergoing routine gall bladder surgery, Canales developed a case of pneumonia and died suddenly on April 16, 2005.
