= Elsa García (singer) =

Mexican-American Tejano singer

- Also known as: La Primera Dama del Tex-Mex
- Born: January 19, 1956 (age 70); Monterrey, Nuevo León, Mexico
- Origin: Houston, Texas, U.S.
- Genres: Tejano
- Years active: 1984–present
- Labels: Puma; Mercury/PolyGram Latino; Capitol/EMI Latin; EMI Latin; Fonovisa
- Website: https://www.elsagarciaofficial.com/

Elsa García is a Mexican-American Tejano singer and producer from Houston, Texas. She has had four albums certified gold, and was nominated for a Grammy Award in 1991 for her album, Simplemente.

== Early life ==
Elsa García was born in Monterrey, Mexico. The daughter of Mexican singer Hermelinda "Linda La Norteña" Escamilla, she was introduced to music at an early age. Her family moved to Houston, Texas when she was two years old. Before coming to music, García had worked at different jobs including disc jockey, accountant, and banker. She also hosted her own radio talk show.

== Career ==
García has been involved in music for over forty years and not only performs and records, but also produced and arranged her own albums, making her the first female producer in the Tejano music industry, coining the nickname "La Primera Dama" ("The First Lady"). García started as a replacement vocalist for her husband's band after their lead singer experienced throat problems and could not perform. The band was then renamed Elsa García and Company, signed with the Houston, Texas label Puma Records, and released their first album Yo Nunca Pense in 1984. Notable songs from the album are "Aventura de Mi Vida" and "Agonia". Two years later, in 1986, the band released the album Fresh, which had a cover of Juan Gabriel's hit song "Tu No Me Dijiste Adios". García led the band in releasing two more albums, Olvidemonos (1987) and ¿Que Piensas? (1988). The band's last independent album Ella (1989) gained the group hometown success. Notable songs from that album are "Ella", "Tres", "Todo Se Va" and "Ayer Estuve Con Mi Nuevo Amor".

In 1990, the band signed with the label Mercury/PolyGram Latino, and released the album Simplemente, for which they received a Grammy nomination. Upon signing with this label, the band ceased use of the "Elsa García and Company" title, and their albums began being credited solely to García on the covers, a successful change putting the spotlight on García. The next year, in 1991, García and the band signed with Capitol/EMI Latin, a new, quickly growing label for the Tejano genre. That year they released the album Ni Más, Ni Menos, their first to be certified gold, thanks to their very popular song "Ya Te Vi". The band garnered much more success and popularity with their succeeding albums Pasión (1992), Escapate Conmigo (1993), and Diez (1995). Escapate Conmigo earned the band their second Grammy nomination, and became one of the bands more well-received albums. García, who at this point became one of the driving forces in the Tejano music, despite it being a male-dominated genre, was ready to celebrate her tenth year in music. The album Diez (1995) showed to be the band's most popular album, holding two of their biggest hits, "Diez", and "La Luna Sera La Luna". García and her group were of the few Tejano artists to receive radio airplay in Mexico during the 1990s.

After the death of her friend Selena, García participated in the Selena tribute at the Houston Astrodome on May 29, 1995. Later in 1995, the then mayor of Houston declared that October 24 would be Elsa García day. In 2011, García was inducted into the Tejano Roots Hall of Fame. In 2012, she was awarded the Lifetime Achievement Award at the Tejano Music Awards. García has been retired from music since 1999, but has recently made a comeback in 2024.

== Discography ==
- Yo Nunca Pense (1984)
- Fresh (1986)
- Olvidemonos (1987)
- ¿Que Piensas? (1988)
- Ella (1989)
- Simplemente (1990)
- Ni Más, Ni Menos (1991)
- Pasión (1992)
- Escapate Conmigo (1993)
- Diez (1995)
- Live Vol. 1 (1996)
- Como Tu y Yo (1996)
- Elsa (1998)
