= Beto Villa =

American saxophonist

Beto Villa (Falfurrias, Texas, October 26, 1915 – 1986) was a Texan saxophonist and considered, alongside Isidro López, the father of the Orquesta Tejana.
