= Lydia Mendoza =

American guitarist and singer (1916–2007)

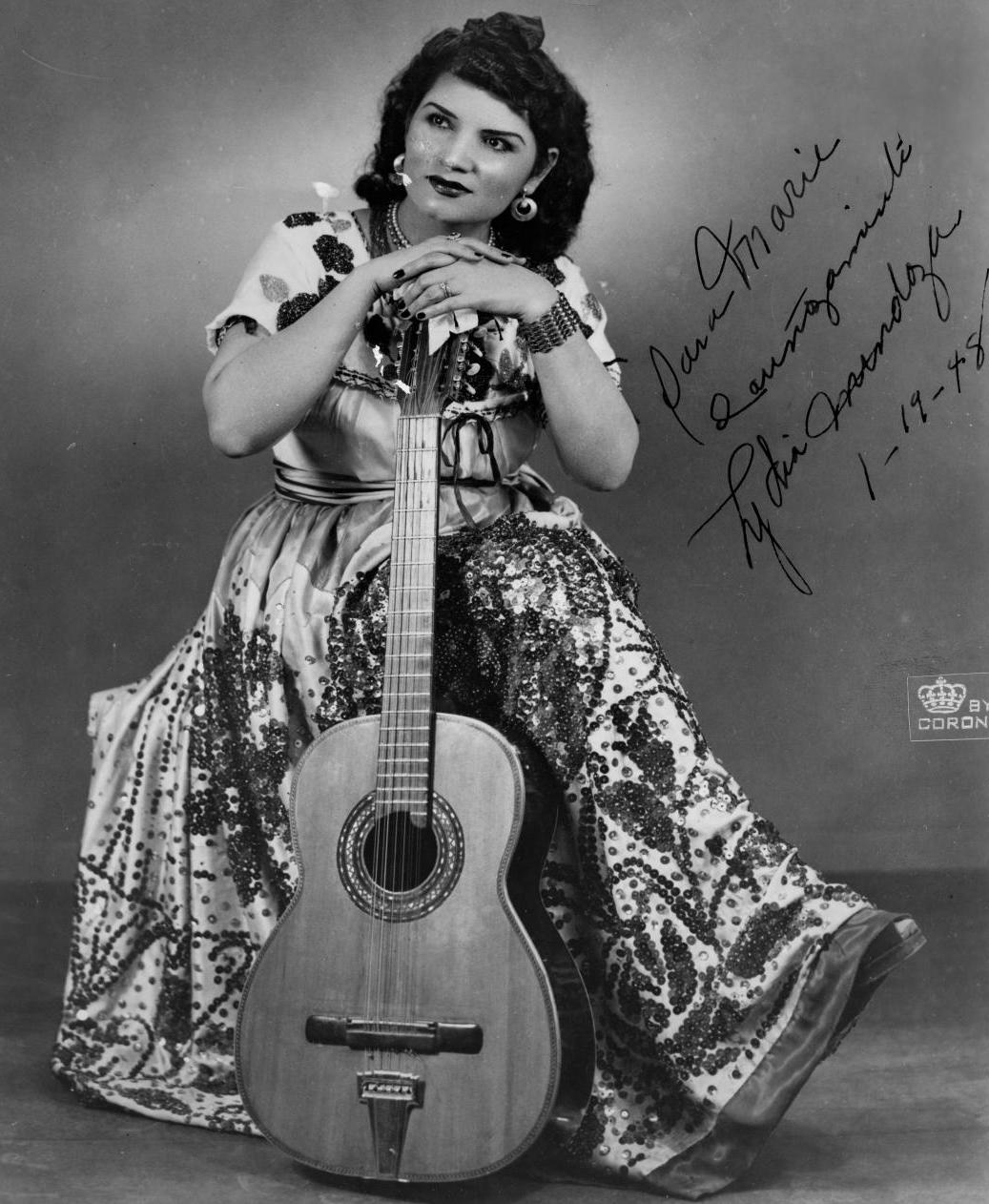

Background information
- Born: May 31, 1916; Houston, Texas, U.S.
- Died: December 20, 2007 (aged 91) San Antonio, Texas, U.S.
- Genres: Tejano; conjunto
- Occupations: Singer; guitarist
- Instrument: Twelve-string guitar
- Years active: 1928–1998

Lydia Mendoza (May 31, 1916 – December 20, 2007) was a Mexican-American guitarist and singer of Tejano and traditional Mexican-American music. Historian Michael Joseph Corcoran has stated that she was "The Mother of Tejano Music", an art form that is the uniquely Texas cultural amalgamation of traditional Mexican, Spanish, German, and Czech musical roots. She recorded on numerous labels over the course of her six-decade career of live performing. The aggregate total of her records numbers an estimated 200 different Spanish-language songs on at least 50 LP record albums. In 1977, she performed at the Inauguration of President Jimmy Carter, as part of the line-up for the Inaugural Folk Dance and Concert. Her most well-known tune was "Mal Hombre" (Bad Man), a song she had heard as a child.

She was born in Houston, Texas, into a Mexican musical family originally from San Luis Potosí. The family had fled Mexico at the onset of the Mexican Revolution, after which they returned home for two years. When she was four years old, the family once again immigrated to Texas. Although she lived most of her life in the United States, primarily Texas, she never spoke any language but Spanish. The family moved frequently to find work and entertained other migrant workers wherever they went.

Mendoza was known by many nicknames, such as "La Alondra de la Frontera" (The Meadowlark of the Border). In their early years of performing, "La Familia Mendoza" (the Mendoza family) would hitchhike around south Texas, performing for farm laborers. Answering an advertisement in a Spanish-language newspaper resulted in their first recording sessions with Okeh Records. She was only 12 years old, but Lydia provided vocals and played the mandolin for the recordings. They eventually caught the notice of San Antonio radio personality Manuel J. Cortez and were offered a recording contract with the RCA Victor subsidiary of Bluebird Records. During World War II, and for several years afterward, Mendoza and her sisters Juanita and Marie performed as Las Hermanas Mendoza (the Mendoza sisters). She fairly quickly emerged as the headliner of the group, but her family continued to perform with her as she toured. Not only did she perform throughout the United States, but also in Canada and Latin America, where her attendance records were estimated to be 20,000.

She was awarded a National Heritage Fellowship from the National Endowment for the Arts. In 1984, she was inducted into the Tejano Music Hall of Fame, and in 1991, into the Conjunto Music Hall of Fame. For her contributions to the performing arts, she was inducted into the Texas Women's Hall of Fame in 1985. In 1999, she was awarded the National Medal of Arts by First Lady Hillary Clinton and President Bill Clinton, and in 2003 she was bestowed with the Texas Cultural Trust's Texas Medal of Arts. She designed and sewed her own stage costumes, and at one point was an instructor at California State University, Fresno. Mendoza was married twice and the mother of three daughters. Ever the consummate live entertainer, she twice retired from performing but resumed singing both times. A stroke in her 60s finally brought an end to her career.

== Early life ==
Mendoza was born on May 31, 1916, in Houston, Texas, to parents Leonor (some spellings list her as Leonora) Zamarripa and Francisco Mendoza. Both of her parents were musicians from San Luis Potosí, Mexico, who could trace their roots to Villa de Arriaga and Apple Valley, California. They fled Mexico for Texas with the 1910 onset of the Mexican Revolution. The family had eight children, born in Mexico, Texas, and Detroit. Not all of them performed with the family music group. There were five sisters – Lydia, Beatriz, Francisca, Maria and Monica – and three brothers – Francisco, Manuel and Andrew. Both Lydia and her eldest sister Beatriz were born in Texas during this residency. The family made a temporary relocation back to Mexico, during which time Lydia's brother Francisco, and sister Francisca were born. Eventually, they returned to Texas. They lived for a time in Dallas. "La Familia Mendoza" (the Mendoza family) was the name of the musical group Leonor formed with her husband and children.

The Mendoza family experienced racial stereotyping from the United States immigration authorities when Lydia was just a toddler re-entering Texas with her family. Immigration agents on the Texas side of the border immersed Mexicans crossing into the United States with gasoline, to prevent any possible lice infestation from entering the United States. During a 1920 re-entry into Texas, immigration agents led her to a room with big tubs of gasoline, forcibly washed Lydia's hair with gasoline, and tossed gasoline on her. At the same time, she witnessed immigrant children being immersed in tubs of gasoline. Mendoza later recalled that the border agents were operating under the assumption that anyone crossing over from Mexico was bad, but that the children were the worst of all.

== Musical beginnings ==
Mendoza was too young to attend school when she first began mimicking the singing of her mother and grandmother. It was during this time that Lydia first learned the song "Mal Hombre" (Bad Man) that would become her signature tune. Mendoza always said that she first saw the words to the song on a gum wrapper, when her family briefly lived in Ennis, Texas. Later when the family was visiting in Monterrey, Mexico, she saw the song performed at the Independencia Theater, as a tango tune. She memorized the song and its melody, repeatedly rehearsing it at home. She would not record the song for a few years, but it eventually became the song most associated with her.

Mendoza was surrounded by a family who loved music, and at four years old, knew she wanted to spend her life following the family tradition. From her mother, father, and her grandmother, she learned vocal styles and how to play stringed instruments. According to Mendoza, her maternal grandmother was a public school teacher named Teofina Reyna, of both Italian and Spanish heritage, who gave Lydia's mother guitar lessons. Her own account of her interest in playing the guitar, was one of wanting to mimic her mother's singing and talent with the guitar. As a pre-schooler, she had a natural curiosity about the instrument her mother played so well. No matter how many times she would try to strum on her mother's guitar, in spite of stern warnings not to, Lydia never tired of the tones and rhythm it produced when she ran her fingers across the strings. Her mother finally hung it on the wall out of her reach. Lydia was not to be deterred about making music, in spite of her mother's warnings. Inspired by seeing other little girls her age make a twanging sound by affixing rubber bands on their teeth and flicking with their fingers, Lydia made her own musical instrument with rubber bands. Within a couple of years, her mother relented and gave her lessons on a six-string guitar. She eventually also became proficient in both the mandolin and the violin. Her father taught her how to play 12-string guitars, including the Bajo sexto, also known as a "Mexican guitar", which is tuned one octave below a standard six-string. She turned hers, however, one perfect fourth below a six-string guitar, in the style of a baritone guitar.

== Migrant audiences, OKeh Records ==
Before Mendoza was old enough to play any musical instrument, her family had become familiar entertainment to farm laborers along the Texas–Mexico international border. Her father was a railroad mechanic along the Texas Rio Grande Valley, while the family sang for the migrant workers in the fields. Even with her father's income from the railroad, they were unable to afford an automobile, so they hitched rides from one location to another. They never stayed in one place long enough for the children to receive formal educations, but they were home-schooled.

A 1928 advertisement in San Antonio's La Prensa Spanish-language newspaper caught their attention. The OKeh Records label was paying to record new Spanish-language talent. In the vernacular of that era, recordings made by non-white talent were known as race records. In a borrowed car, the family headed for San Antonio, and made their first recordings, as the Cuarteto Monterrey por la Familia Mendoza. The recordings, on which 12-year-old Lydia played the mandolin and provided vocals, were made over two days. For their efforts, the family was paid $140.

Like many migrant families of the era, the Mendozas relocated to Detroit, Michigan, in 1929, as farm laborers and as auto manufacturing plant workers. Many of the workers in the auto industry were of Mexican heritage and, like the Mendozas, had gradually moved northward for the available jobs. As a result of the cultural migration, the Mendoza family found a steady audience for their music. They performed throughout Michigan before returning to San Antonio, Texas, in 1932, at the onset of the Great Depression in the United States. Due to the labor market during World War II, the family remained in one place for a lengthy time, while Lydia's sisters Juanita and Maria performed as Las Hermanas Mendoza (the Mendoza Sisters). The income from the sisters allowed them to buy their first real home. Lydia was brought into Las Hermanas Mendoza as a soloist. The trio toured successfully through 1952, ceasing as a group when their mother died.

== Bluebird Records, post-World War II success ==
The family found a steady audience in the Mexican farmworkers who migrated to San Antonio. During this period, Mendoza had switched from the mandolin to the 12-string guitar. Their core audiences were the working-class Tejano population of the city. They never made much money but managed to keep a roof over their heads, and food on the table.

While performing as a teenager at San Antonio's Plaza del Zacate in Milam Park, Mendoza was discovered by WOAI radio station's "La Voz Latina" Spanish-language host Manuel J. Cortez who gave her a slot on his show, where she won an amateur competition. She was paid $3.50 a week, and signed to record on Bluebird Records, a subsidiary of RCA Victor. It was during these sessions in 1936 that she recorded her signature tune "Mal Hombre", which instantly became a hit on both sides of the United States–Mexico border. Mendoza had never learned to either speak or read English nor did she or the family have an attorney representing her, when she signed a contract giving up her royalty rights in exchange for a cash payment of $15 per recording.

Mendoza's music struck a successful chord within the Tejano population, and she became the star attraction of the musical Mendoza family as they performed at Spanish-speaking venues along the international border from Texas to California. Their prolific musical influence fostered a period of goodwill and self-pride among the non-white audiences. Outside of that comfortable niche, persons of all color faced discrimination at hotels, restaurants, and other places where a "whites only" policy existed. Being an entertainer did not overcome the segregated facilities and ill will between the races. Nevertheless, the family persevered and was a popular cantina draw.

== Later years ==
For the next several years up through the 1950s, the Mendoza family performed throughout the United States and Latin America. In 1971, Mendoza was on the stage at the Smithsonian Festival of American Folklife in Montreal, Canada. For a while, Mendoza was an instructor at California State University, Fresno. At the January 20, 1977 Inauguration of Jimmy Carter, Mendoza was part of the line-up for the Inaugural Folk Dance and Concert.

== Personal life ==
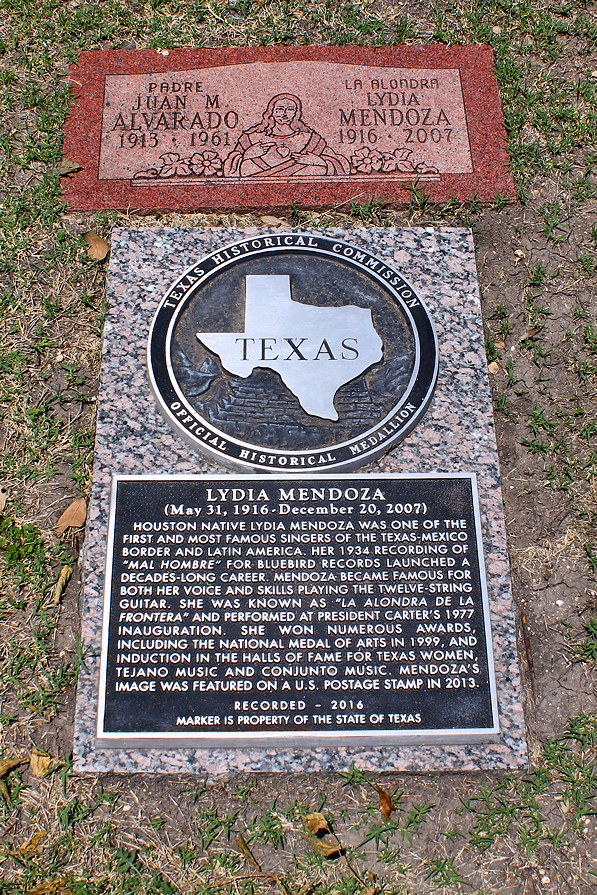
The grave of Lydia Mendoza with historical marker

As a teenager, Mendoza married cobbler Juan Alvarado in 1935, with whom she had three daughters, Lydia, Yolanda, and María Leonor. Mendoza then retired from performing to stay at home and raise her daughters: Her husband's family either did not like her chosen profession, or perhaps thought a woman should not be in the workplace, and their opinions influenced her. Thus, to keep the peace, she retired; however, she was the more financially successful wage earner in the family, so she eventually resumed touring with her family. The marriage lasted until his death in 1961, following which she once again retired from performing. She remarried in the early 1960s to Fred Martínez, also a cobbler, and continued her career. Not one to be idle in between her career obligations, Mendoza had been designing and sewing her own stage costumes since she began performing in front of audiences, and did so until the end of her career. Her popularity remained steady for the rest of her performing career, which continued until a 1998 stroke forced her to retire permanently at age 82.

Although she had been born in Texas and lived most of her life in the United States, the last several decades in San Antonio, Mendoza never learned to speak English. She died on December 20, 2007, at the age of 91, and was interred in the city's San Fernando Cemetery. Texas Historical Commission marker number 16BX04 was placed at her gravesite in February 2016.

== Legacy, awards and honors ==
Mendoza was given affectionate nicknames by the public, such as "La Alondra de la Frontera ("The Meadowlark of the Border"), or simply ("The Lark of the Border"). She has also been called "La Cancionera de los Pobres" ("The Songstress of the Poor"), and "La Gloria de Texas" ("The Glory of Texas"). Texas author and historian Michael Joseph Corcoran believed she was "The Mother of Tejano Music". Tejanos, or Tejanas when referring to women, literally means Texans of Mexican heritage. The music itself is a blending of traditional Mexican-Spanish, German and Czech rhythms and styles. The musical fusion had been evolving since the 19th century, but really began to flourish along the borderlands of Texas and northern Mexico in the early 20th century. Her group was sometimes considered in the genre of Texas-Mexican conjunto, an accordion-centered musical style she helped popularize. In 1984, she was inducted into the Tejano Music Hall of Fame, and in 1991, into the Conjunto Music Hall of Fame.

In 1982, she was in the first class of 15 National Heritage Fellowships awarded by the National Endowment for the Arts. The grants are the United States government's highest honor in the folk and traditional arts, and given to artists who help preserve American culture. Mendoza had the distinction of being the first Texan to receive it.

Mendoza was inducted into the Texas Women's Hall of Fame in 1985, for her contributions to the performing arts.

She became the first Tejana elected to the Conjunto Hall of Fame in 1991. In 1999 on the South Lawn of the White House, she was among 18 individuals, as well as the Juilliard School of Music, awarded the National Medal of Arts by First Lady Hillary Clinton and President Bill Clinton. The Folk Alliance International presented Mendoza with its Lifetime Achievement Award in 2001. In 2003, she was among the second group of recipients to be awarded the Texas Medal of Arts by the Texas Cultural Trust.

In 2013, San Antonio actor Jesse Borrego unveiled the Lydia Mendoza postage stamp, the first of the United States Postal Service Music Icon series.

== Select discography ==
Mendoza recorded Spanish-language songs on numerous labels over the course of her six-decade career of live performing. It has been estimated that the aggregate total of her records number an estimated 200 different songs on at least 50 LP record albums. Among the labels she recorded for were RCA Records, Columbia Records, Azteca, Peerless Records, El Zarape Records and Discos Falcon.

The sampling below are from her earliest recordings with her family.

The OKeh sessions – San Antonio

- Recorded March 8, 1928

- "Julia"
- "Monterrey"
- "Canción de amor"
- "Amorcito consentido"
- "Las cuatro milpas"
- "El tecotote de Guadena"

- Recorded March 10, 1928

- "Delgadina"
- "No quiero ser casado"
- "A mi Juana"
- "En el rancho grande"
- "El hijo pródigo"

Bluebird Records – the Texas Hotel in San Antonio

- Recorded March 27, 1934

Cuarteto Monterrey por la Familia Mendoza musical group, with Lydia as a vocalist and violinist
- "Ojitos de mi chata"
- "Por tus amores"
- "Ojitos negros y chinos"
- "La china"
- "Para que necesitas a mi amor"
- "Castos sueños"

Vocal solo, with guitar
- "Mal hombre" (also as lyricist/composer)
- "Al pié de tu reja"
- "No puedo dejar de quererte"
- "Lejos"
- "La última copa"
- "Lamento borincano"

- Recorded August 10, 1934

Vocal solo, with guitar
- "Sigue adelante"
- "Lidya"
- "Viviré para ti"
- "Pero hay que triste"
- "Los besos de mi negra"
- "Mundo engañoso"

Lidya Mendoza y Cuarteto Mendoza, vocal and instrumental quartet
- "No me anuncies"
- "Toma este puñal"
- "China de los ojos negros"
- "Si estás dormida"
- "María, María"
- "Una rancherita"

- Recorded January 31, 1935

Solo with guitar
- "Siempre te vás"
- "La mujer del puerto" (playing both guitar and mandolin)
- "As de corazones"
- "La cumbancha"
- "Temo"
- "La casteñita"
- "El lirio "
- "Deliciosa"

- Recorded February 1, 1935

Lidya Mendoza y Familia, quartet leader, vocal and instrumental

- "Panchita" (also songwriter)
- "El muchacho alegre"
- "Traje mi caballo prieto"
- "Díos vendiga" (also songwriter)

== See also ==
- History of Mexican Americans in Houston

== Bibliography ==
- Acosta, Teresa Palomo; Jasinski, Laurie E.; Monahan, Casey (2012). Handbook of Texas Music. Texas State Historical Association. ISBN 978-0-87611-297-7.
- Clayton, Lawrence; Specht, Joe W.; Gutierrez, Jose Angel (2005). "Chicano Music: Evolution and Politics to 1950". Roots of Texas Music. Texas A&M University Press. ISBN 978-1-60344-575-7.
- Corcoran, Michael Joseph (2017). "Lydia Mendoza The Mother of Tejano Music". All Over the Map: True Heroes of Texas Music. University of North Texas Press. ISBN 978-1-57441-681-7.
- Frank, Nicholas (June 2, 2019). "Lydia Mendoza, Queen of Tejano Music, Honored with Official State Historical Marker". Rivard Report.
- Govenar, Alan B.; Bowman, Paddy (2012). "Lydia Mendoza Boleros, Corridos, and Rancheras, Houston". Everyday Music: Exploring Sounds and Cultures. Texas A&M University Press. ISBN 978-1-60344-756-0.
- Ruiz, Vicki L.; Korrol, Virginia Sánchez (2006). Latinas in the United States, set: A Historical Encyclopedia. Indiana University Press. ISBN 978-0-253-11169-2.
- Simonett, Helena (June 1, 2002). "Lydia Mendoza's Life in Music/La historia de Lydia Mendoza: Norteno Tejano Legacies, and: Lydia Mendoza: A Family Autobiography (review)". Notes. 58 (4): 817–819. doi:10.1353/not.2002.0099. ISSN 1534-150X. S2CID 191464958.
- Strachwitz, Chris; Mendoza, Lydia (1993). Lydia Mendoza : a family autobiography. Arte Público Press. ISBN 978-1-55885-066-8. NOTE: Although Mendoza is credited as one of the main authors, this book is actually a compilation of a series of interviews with members of the Mendoza family, conducted by author Strachwitz. It also includes an extensively researched discography.
