= Isidro López (musician) =

American musician (1929–2004)

Isidro López (May 17, 1929 – August 15, 2004) was a Corpus Christi, Texas-based Tejano bandleader, influential in Latin American music in the United States in the 1950s. Óscar Martínez joined the Isidro Lopez Orchestra in 1954 and penned "El Tejano Enamorado," Lopez' first hit. Signed to Ideal Records in 1954, he released more than sixty singles and eight LP records in the 1950s and 1960s for that label.
