= Conjunto =

Musical ensembles popular in Cuba and Mexico

The term conjunto (Spanish pronunciation: [koŋˈxunto], literally 'group', 'ensemble') refers to several types of small musical ensembles present in different Latin American musical traditions, mainly in Mexico and Cuba. While Mexican conjuntos play styles such as norteño and tejano, Cuban conjuntos specialize in the son, as well as its derivations such as salsa.

== Mexican ==
Mexican conjunto music, also known as conjunto tejano, was born in south Texas at the end of the 19th century, after German settlers introduced the button accordion. The bajo sexto has come to accompany the button accordion and is integral to the conjunto sound. Many conjuntos are concentrated in the Southwestern portion of the United States, primarily in Texas and California. In Mexico, the term conjunto is associated with norteño and tejano music. Since tejano was bred out of norteño music originally, this association is not entirely false. However, due to various cultural and socioeconomic developments in the 1900s, norteño musicians began trailblazing the tejano genre as a tangent to conjunto. In the United States and Mexico, a conjunto band is composed of four main instruments: the button accordion, the bajo sexto, an electric bass, and a drum set. The place of the electric bass was first filled by the tololoche, or contrabass, until it was replaced in the 1950s. They are popular in northern Mexico and southern Texas. German and East European settlers brought their accordions, waltzes and polkas to the region, which were adapted by the local population. Texas accordion player Flaco Jiménez is probably the best-known conjunto musician in the United States, with a career spanning sixty years and earning him six Grammy awards.

=== History ===
During the 1920s, American recording companies made efforts to enter the Chicano market, which brought the budding genre of conjunto music to a greater public eye, with some of the most prominent musicians from this time period being Narciso Martinez and Santiago Jimenez.

There was a decline in the production of conjunto recordings during World War II. Beginning in 1946, there was a shift to records being made by local Chicano-owned companies rather than Anglo-American record companies. Other changes occurred during this period, including the addition of vocal singing to conjuntos. Other forms of Chicano music, such as female duets, had included lyrics already, but Valerio Longoria was the first to add them to conjuntos, but it came at the added cost of excluding women from the industry, since conjunto was already a male-dominated genre. In the 1950s, the ranchera and bolero started to be included in the genres that conjunto groups would play, and rancheras grew to become one of the central features of conjunto music, along with polkas. Conjunto groups also started to play more in cantinas and dance halls as they gained popularity.

Throughout the 1970s and 1980s, conjunto music began to decline in popularity among tejanos because there were not as many young groups being formed and producing new recordings, but norteño groups did not have the same issue. After one of the most popular tejano groups of the 1960s, Conjunto Bernal, disbanded, norteño groups like Los Bravos del Norte, headed by Ramón Ayala, gained traction. Chulas Fronteras is a documentary film from the 1970s which illustrates how the music meshed into the lives of families in south Texas and northern Mexico.

Beginning in the 1990s, progressive conjuntos, which used pitos (horns) and synthesizers, became more popular. Emilio Navaira was one of the most prominent tejano musicians during this time, and his popularity led to conjunto tejano music and the accordion becoming objects of cultural pride among Chicanos.

=== Texas-Mexican Conjunto ===
The Texas-Mexican Conjunto is a genre of música norteño. Since the turn of the century, this form of music has been ever evolving as an important musical form that is developed by working-class Texas-Mexican musicians. Narciso Martínez who is known as "the father" of the Texas-Mexican conjunto for bringing in a surge of innovation and creativity as an accordionist. Martínez promoted the use of the accordion, but looked to stamp his own personal style. He abandoned the old, Germanic technique by avoiding the bass chord buttons on his two-row accordion. Narciso Martínez's new style became the starting point for the surge of the modern conjunto. At the end of the nineteenth century, one row accordions became inexpensive and readily available to musicians. Tejano musicians took up the accordion as a solo instrument and use it at rural social events such as fandango.

One of these musicians to come from the surge of the modern conjunto were Carmen y Laura. Carmen Hernández Marroquín married Armando Marroquín, who established Ideal Records along with Paco Betancourt. Carmen y Laura went on to record hundreds of songs for the company, and some of their first recordings had accompaniment by Narciso Martínez. As time went on, the Texas-Mexican conjunto has grown in prominence among Hispanics throughout the state of Texas, particularly in San Antonio, Austin, Alice, Laredo, the Rio Grande Valley, and Corpus Christi. Throughout the 70's, 80's, and 90's, some of the most popular conjunto groups included Ruben Naranjo y Los Gamblers, Steve Jordan (accordionist) y su Rio Jordan, Los Dos Gilbertos, and Tony De La Rosa y su Conjunto. Into the more modern day of Conjunto with groups like Ricky Naranjo y Los Gamblers, Los Garcia Brothers, and The Delta Boyz. Conjuntos spawned from working-class Texas-Mexicans, and evolved into an alternative musical ideology by working-class Texas-Mexicans. It became endowed with a symbolic power and continues to have a dominance among the audience of today's working class people.

=== Conjunto festivals in the United States ===
The Tejano-Conjunto Festival in San Antonio began in 1982 and is presented by the Guadalupe Cultural Arts Center, a San Antonio-based nonprofit organization. It is held each May in Rosedale Park in San Antonio.

The Rancho Alegre Conjunto Music Festival in Austin began in 2012 and is presented by Austin-based Rancho Alegre, a nonprofit organization dedicated to preserving and promoting Conjunto music.

The Narciso Martinez Conjunto Festival in the Rio Grande Valley began in 1993 and is presented every fall by the Narciso Martinez Cultural Arts Center, a San-Benito-based nonprofit organization.

The Ruben Naranjo Memorial Music Festival in Alice began in 1999 following the death of conjunto legend Ruben Naranjo, who was from Alice. It had an annual status until 2005 when they held the last event.

=== Other types of Mexican conjunto ===
==== Jarocho ====
A conjunto jarocho is a type of Mexican folk ensemble. Often it consists of requinto, arpa jarocha, jarana and leona, but can also have violin, pandero octagonal, quijada, marimbol or güiro. Its repertory covers sones jarochos in 3/4, 6/8 and 4/4.

==== Huasteco ====
A conjunto huasteco is a type of Mexican folk ensemble. Often it consists of guitarra huapanguera, jarana huasteca and violin, but can also have other violins and guitars. Its repertory covers sones huastecos in 3/4 and 6/8, and rancheras.

==== Arpa grande ====
A conjunto de arpa grande is a type of Mexican folk ensemble. Often it consists of diatonic harp, Mexican vihuela, guitar and two violins. Its repertory covers planeco music: sones planecos in 3/4 and 6/8, and rancheras.

==== Calentano ====
A conjunto calentano is a type of Mexican folk ensemble. Often it consists of violin, guitar and tamborita, but can also have other violin, guitarra panzona, guitarra sexta and harp. Its repertory covers calentano music: sones calentanos and gustos, and other musical forms such as Indias, malagueñas, peteneras, valses, polkas, pasos dobles, sones, chilenas, minuets, rancheras, and corridos.

== Cuban ==
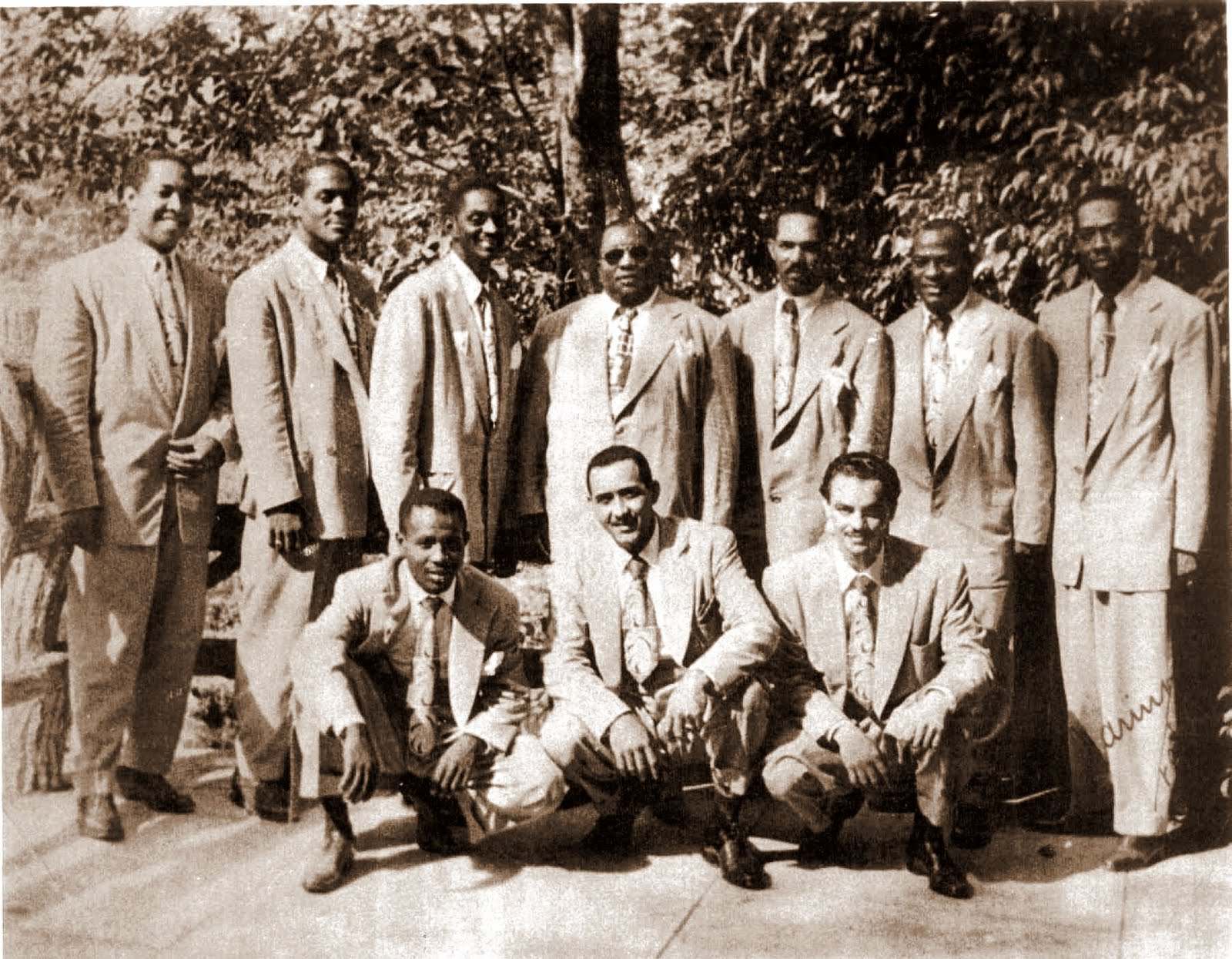
Conjunto de Arsenio Rodríguez c. 1949.

Cuban conjunto music was developed in the 1940s by famous tres player Arsenio Rodríguez by adding several instruments (a piano, a tumbadora and various trumpets) to the typical son cubano ensemble, the septeto. Septetos consisted of a lead vocalist and guitar(s), double bass, bongó, maracas and trumpet. Even though the origins of the conjunto cubano can be traced to several sextetos and septetos of the 1920s, it wasn't until the 1940s when Arsenio Rodríguez expanded the Sexteto Bellamar that the conjunto was established. However, some authors argue that the Conjunto Kubavana, conducted by Alberto Ruiz, was the first Cuban conjunto, founded around 1937. The conjunto contrasted with ballroom orchestras, the charangas, orquestas and danzoneras that were made popular by bandleaders such as Antonio Arcaño.

Conjunto music was crucial in the early development of salsa. In the late 1950s and early 1960s, the Puerto Rican music scene in New York City revolved around charangas such as Charlie Palmieri's Duboney Orchestra. Their music was largely based on Cuban styles such as mambo, chachachá and, most importantly, pachanga. Key charanga flautist, bandleader and entrepreneur Johnny Pacheco switched from the charanga configuration to the conjunto in 1964. However, the first New York-based conjunto was Eddie Palmieri's "La Perfecta", which had its debut in 1962. These conjuntos would be crucial in the early development of the most successful Latin American music genre to date, salsa. Notably, the introduction of Puerto Rican music styles such as bomba and plena within the conjunto and Cuban music in general resulted in what is known today as salsa.

== See also ==
- Mexican music
- Cuban music
