= Tejano music =

Music genre fusing Mexican and European influences

- Stylistic origins: Pop; Rock; R&B; Blues; Jazz; Country; Conjunto; Mexican cumbia; Mariachi; Norteño; Grupera
- Cultural origins: 20th century, Texas and Mexico

Regional scenes
- Central and South Texas, Northeastern Mexico

Other topics
- Banda music; Latin music; New Mexico music; Regional Mexican music; Texas country music

Tejano music (Spanish: música tejana), also known as Tex-Mex music, is a popular music style fusing American and Mexican influences. Its evolution began in northern Mexico (a variation of regional Mexican music known as norteño).

It reached a larger audience in the late 20th century with the popularity of performers and groups such as Mazz, Selena, La Mafia, Ram Herrera, La Sombra, Elida Reyna, Elsa García, Laura Canales, Intocable, Jay Perez, Emilio Navaira, Esteban "Steve" Jordan, Shelly Lares, David Lee Garza y Los Musicales, Jennifer Peña and La Fiebre.

== Origins ==
Central to the evolution of early Tejano music was the blend of traditional forms such as the corrido and mariachi, and Continental European styles, such as polka introduced by German, Polish, and Czech settlers in the late 19th century. In particular, the accordion was adopted by Tejano folk musicians at the turn of the 20th century, and it became a popular instrument for amateur musicians in Texas and Northern Mexico. Small bands known as orquestas, featuring amateur musicians, became a staple at community dances. Early inceptions of Tejano music demonstrated musical innovation, but also a social and cultural innovation in themes that countered narratives of dominant culture.

At the turn of the century, Tejanos were mostly involved in ranching and agriculture. The only diversion was the occasional traveling musician who would come to the ranches and farms. Their basic instruments were the flute, guitar, and drum, and they sang songs that were passed down through the generations from songs originally sung in Mexico. One of these musicians was Lydia Mendoza, who became one of the first to record Spanish language music as part of RCA's expansion of their popular race records of the 1920s. As these traveling musicians traveled into areas where the German Texans and other European settlers lived.

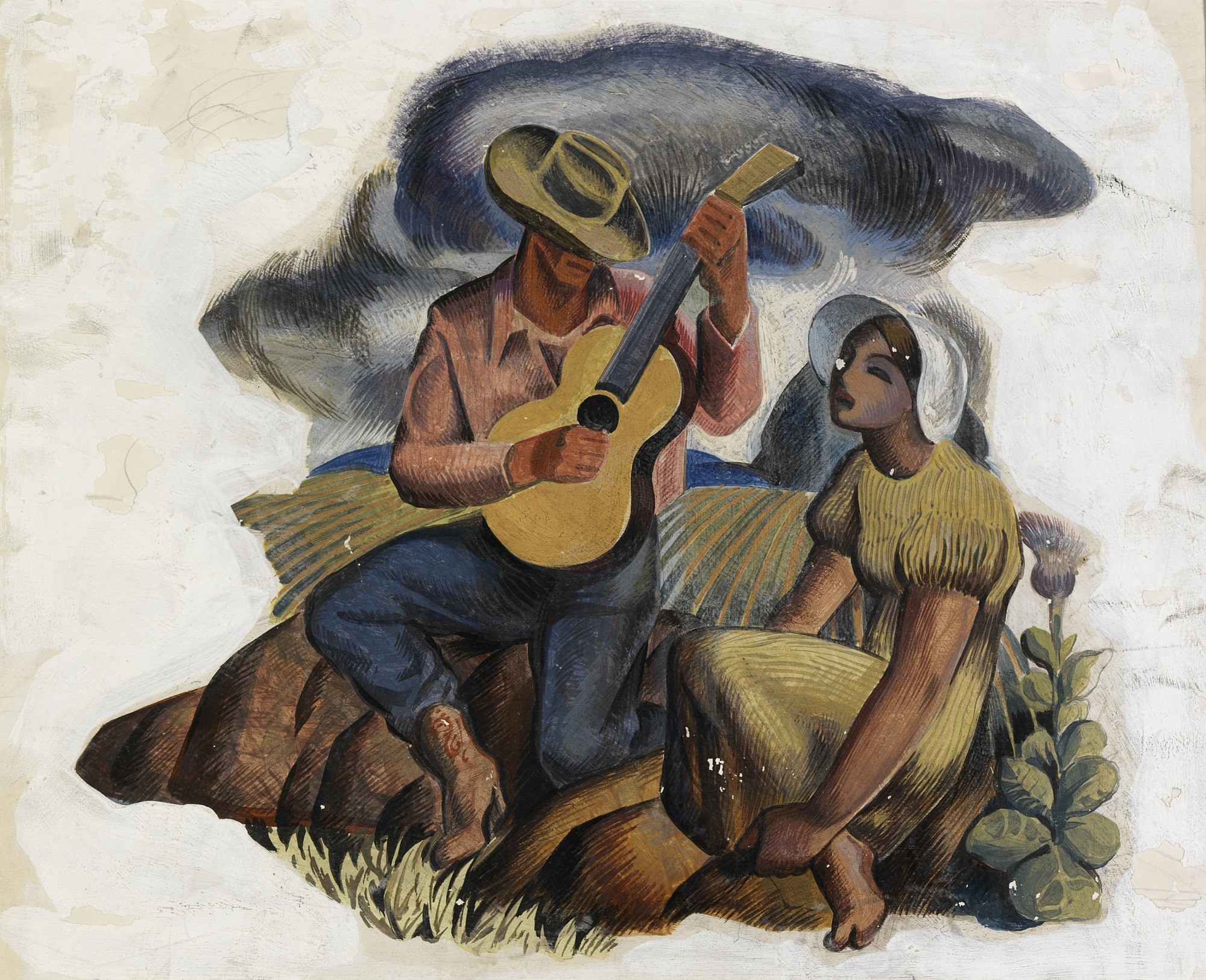
“Music of the Plains” (mural study, Kilgore, Texas Post Office, 1939) by Xavier Gonzalez. This New Deal-era artwork features a cowboy of Mexican heritage serenading a woman, symbolizing the deep Hispanic cultural roots in Kilgore's identity. The original study is housed in the Smithsonian American Art Museum.

Norteño/conjunto accordion pioneer Narciso Martínez, known as the "Father of Conjunto Music", defined the accordion's role in conjunto music. He learned many tunes from German, Polish and Czech brass bands and transposed them to accordion. Martínez gave accordion playing a new virtuosity in the 1930s, when he adopted the two button row accordion. At the same time, he formed a group with bajo sexto player Santiago Almeida.

With the accordion, drums, and bajo sexto, Tejanos now had a sound they could begin to call their own. In the 1940s, Valerio Longoria introduced lyrics to conjunto music, further establishing the Tejano claim to this new sound.

In the 1950s, Isidro Lopez further revolutionized the Tejano sound by emphasizing less on the traditional Spanish that Valerio used and using the new Tex-Mex instead. This created a newer sound and took us one step close to the sound we have today. In the 1960s and 70s Little Joe and The Latinaires (later renamed La Familia), The Latin Breed, Luis Ramirez Y su Latin Express, and others infused the orchestra sound into the Tejano sound, taking their influences from Pop, R&B, and other forms of music. In the late 70s and early 80s, there was a new sound emerging with up-and-coming groups like McAllen's Espejismo, led by songwriter/lead singer Rudy Valdez, and Brownsville natives Joe Lopez, Jimmy Gonzalez, and Mazz introduced keyboard to Tejano, influenced by the disco sound of the era. During that period, La Mafia became the first Tejano band to put on rock-style shows for their generation.

== History ==
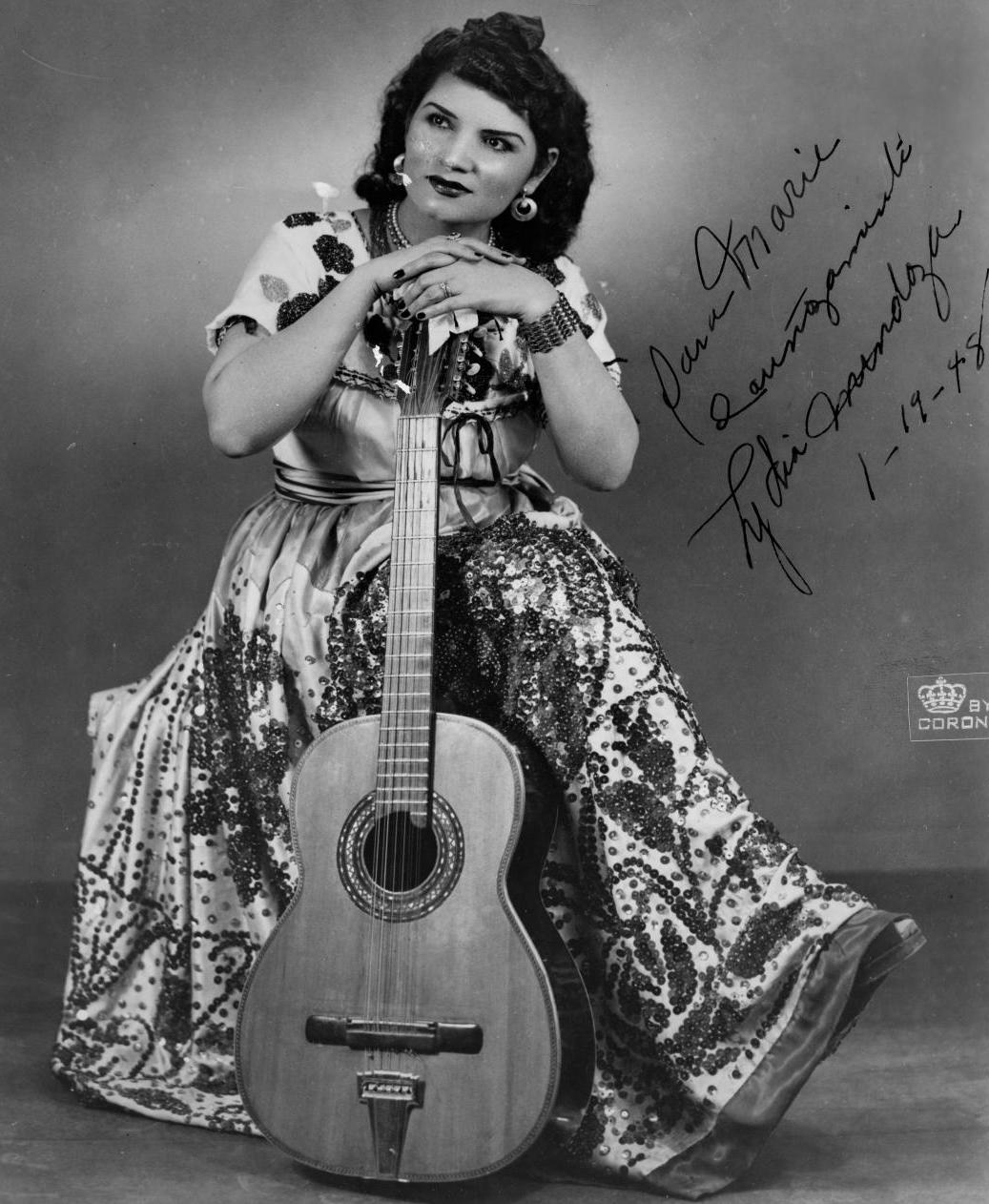
Lydia Mendoza was a singer and songwriter of traditional Mexican music.

Tejano musicians like Flaco Jiménez and Esteban Steve Jordan carried on Martinez's tradition of accordion virtuosity and became a fixture on the international World Music scene by the 1980s.

Women were not relevant to the Tejano music recording industry until 1928. Lydia Mendoza recorded with her mother and sister and then went on to make her own songs. Carmen y Laura Hernandez recorded a song called “Se Me Fue Mi Amor.” It was important to Tejano music as it presented a woman’s point of view and it gave Tejano its sound. In the 1950s and 1960s, rock and roll and country music made inroads, and electric guitars and drums were added to conjunto combos. Also, performers such as Little Joe added both nuances of soul music and R&B, and a Chicano political consciousness. Little Joe, Estevan Jordan, The Royal Jesters, Romances, Carlos Guzman, Joe Bravo, Dimas Three, Chuck & the Dots, the Sky Tones, the Broken Hearts, the Volumes and Sunny Ozuna and the Sunliners were popular in 1960s.

The 1960s and 1970s brought a new chicano music and the first La Onda Tejana Broadcasters. Popular Tejano musician and producer Paulino Bernal of the Conjunto Bernal discovered and introduced to the Tejano music scene the norteño band Los Relampagos del Norte with Ramón Ayala and Cornelio Reyna on his Bego Records. Ayala still enjoys success on both sides of the border. Reyna enjoyed a very successful career as an actor and solo singer and resurfaced in the Tejano scene with a major hit with his collaboration with Tejano band La Mafia. He toured constantly until his death. In the 1960s and 1970s, the first La Onda Tejana broadcasting pioneers hit the airwaves including Marcelo Tafoya (first recipient of the Tejano Music Awards "Lifetime Achievement Award), Ramiro "Snowball" de la Cruz, Mary Rodriguez, Rosita Ornelas, and Luis Gonzalez, shortly followed by an influx of broadcasters including the Davila family of San Antonio. This central Texas support by popular broadcasters helped fuel La Onda.

In 1987, Gloria Anzaldúa wrote:

The whole time I was growing up there was norteño music sometimes called North Mexican border music, or Tex-Mex music, or Chicano music, or cantina (bar) music. I grew up listening to conjuntos, three or four-piece bands made up of folk musicians playing guitar, bajo sexto, drums and button accordion, which Chicanos had borrowed from the German immigrants who had come to Central Texas and Mexico to farm and build breweries. In the Rio Grande Valley, Steve Jordan and Little Joe Hernández were popular, and Flaco Jiménez was the accordion king. The rhythms of Tex-Mex music are those of the polka, also adapted from the Germans, who in turn had borrowed the polka from the Czechs and Bohemians. [...] I grew up feeling ambivalent about our music. Country-western and rock and roll had more status. In the 50s and 60s, for the slightly educated and agringado Chicanos, there existed a sense of shame at being caught listening to our music. Yet I couldn't stop my feet from thumping to the music, could not stop humming the words, nor hide from myself the exhilaration I felt when I heard it.

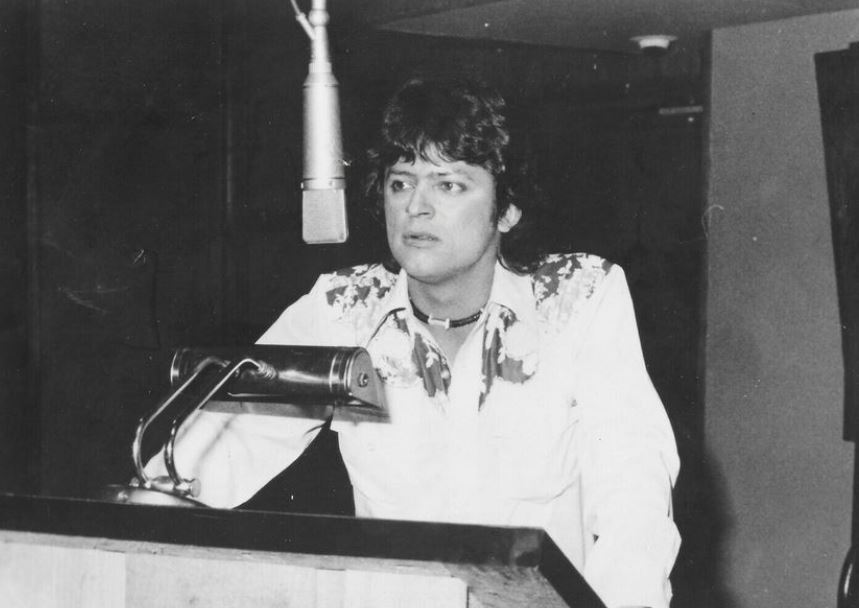
Johnny Rodriguez achieved fame in the 1970s with hit songs like "Pass Me By" and "Ridin' My Thumb to Mexico."

La Onda popularity continued to surge in the early to mid-1980s with the fusion progression of Tejano music coming to the forefront regionally with Tejano ballads like Espejismo's hit "Somos Los Dos", written and sung by McAllen native Rudy Valdez, and La Sombra with their Tex-Mex English and Spanish brand of Tejano. As the 1990s dawned, La Mafia, already holding over a dozen Tejano Music Awards, originated a new Tejano style later to become a Tejano standard. With extensive touring from as early as 1988, they eventually opened the doors for such artists as Selena Quintanilla, Emilio Navaira, Jay Perez, and Mazz. Electronic instruments and synthesizers increasingly dominated the sound, and Tejano music increasingly appealed to bilingual country and rock fans. In the wake of her murder, Selena Quintanilla's music received attention from a mainstream American audience as well. Quintanilla, known as "The Queen of Tejano Music", became the first female Tejano artist to win a Grammy and her Ven Conmigo became the first Tejano album by a female artist to be certified gold.

Since the end of the 20th century, Tejano has seen a decline of dedicated radio stations across the US, due to several factors. Among these is the success of Intocable. As a result, many radio stations across the U.S., especially in Texas, have converted to Norteño/banda. This has caused Tejano internet radio to become popular.

At the turn of the 21st century, Tejano influence has declined in part due to decreased promotion, the rise in Regional Mexican and other Latin music, the breakup or retirement of established performers, and the emergence of few new performers. Most Tejano artists who performed throughout the 1990s during the music's peak who are still performing today have rarely played to the same wide attention in recent years. Regardless, today's Tejano music, while far more pop-oriented than its Depression-era roots, is still a regional musical style in several Tejano communities as well as in other parts of the United States.

== Development ==
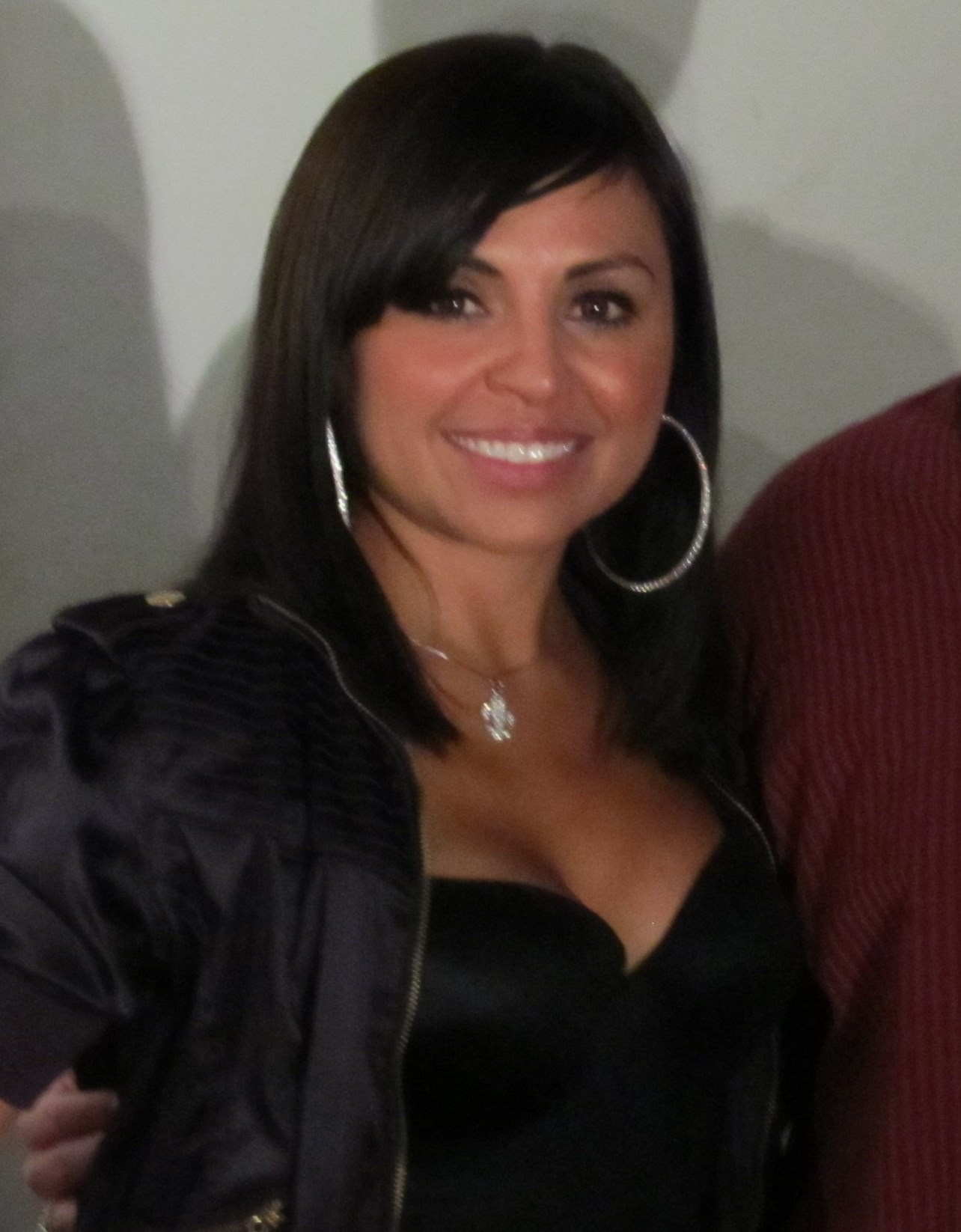
Elida Reyna

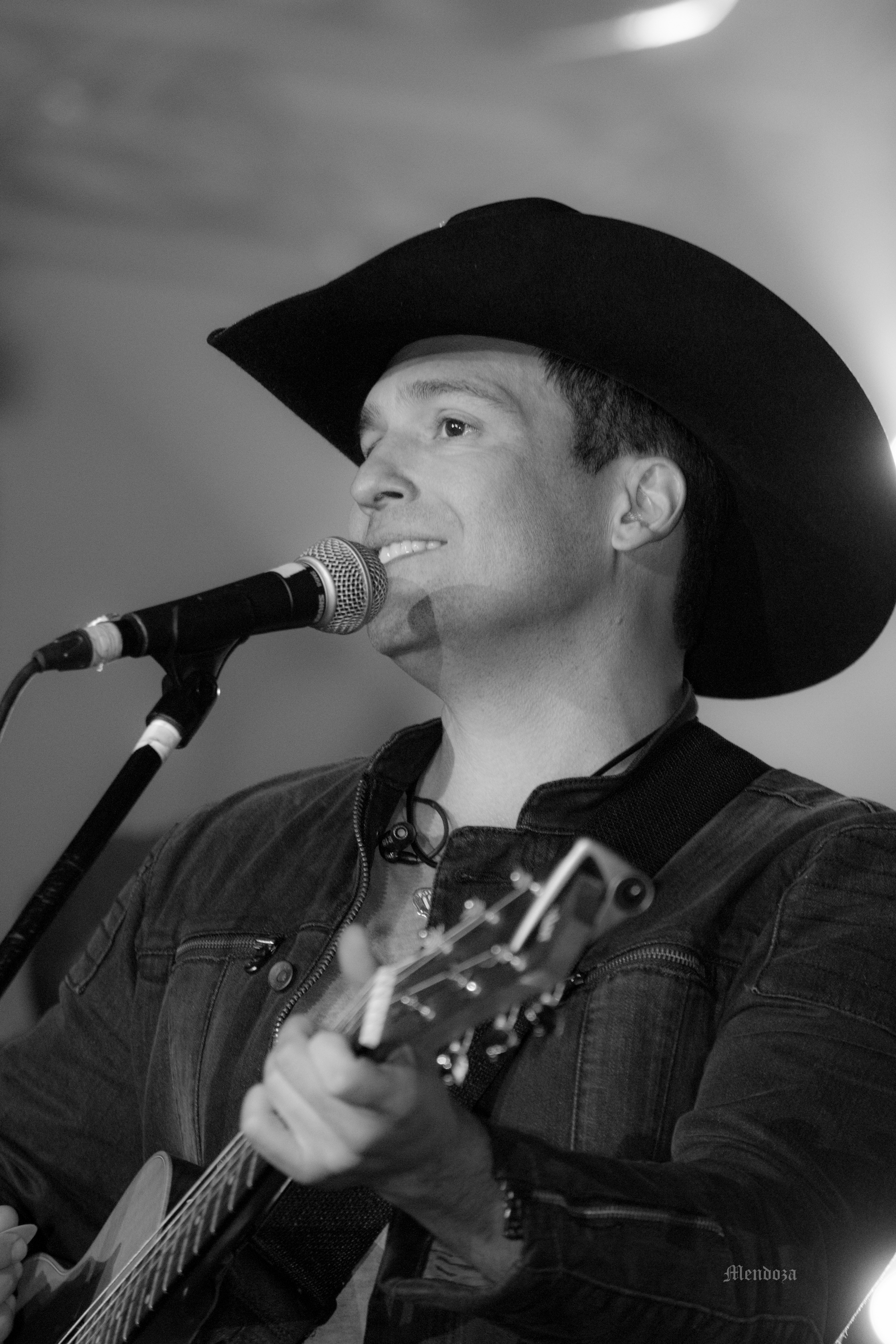
Bobby Pulido at The Laredo Coliseum in 2016

Michael Salgado

Tejano music was born in Texas. Although it has influences from Mexico and other Latin American countries, the main influences are American. The types of music that make up Tejano are folk music, roots music, rock, R&B, soul music, blues, country music and the Latin influences of norteño, mariachi, and Mexican cumbia. Tejano musicians such as Emilio and Raulito Navaira, David Lee Garza, and Jay Perez exhibit influence from rock and roots music.

Tejano has various categories of music and bands. Three major categories are conjunto, orchestra/orquesta, and modern. A conjunto band is composed of accordion, bajo sexto, electric bass, and drums. Examples of conjunto bands are Esteban "Steve" Jordan, and The Hometown Boys. An orchestra/orquesta consists of bass, drums, electric guitar, synthesizer, and a brass section on which it relies heavily for its sound. Some examples of Modern bands are Ruben Ramos and the Texas Revolution, The Liberty Band, The Latin Breed, La Mafia, Selena Quintanilla, La Sombra, Elida Reyna y Avante, Los Palominos, David Lee Garza y Los Musicales, Shelly Lares, Jay Perez, and Mazz.

Mexican influence on Tejano music has resulted in a sound increasingly more like Norteño. The accordion, while a historically popular instrument in Tejano music, has gone from a secondary instrument to a must-have instrument. Today, groups like Sunny Sauceda, Eddie Gonzalez, and La Tropa F emphasize the accordion.

== Music industry ==
During the Post World War II years, local and regional companies emerged to record and market Tejano music. Key factors that influenced the production of Tejano music can be attributed to a diversifying American culture and greater socioeconomic opportunities enabled Mexican American musicians to perform and record music for regional audiences. Early popular forms of Tejano music in the form of female duets and orquesta tejana of the 1940s later influenced the development of Tex-Mex style of the 1950s, and La Onda Chicana (The Chicano Wave) of the 1960s. The growing popularity of accordion based music and "homegrown" records directly influenced the need for Tejano record producers and labels. During the 1990s, Selena Quintanilla became one of the most popular Latinas in Tejano music. She brought attention to many other Latinas in the industry, creating the Latin Music Boom.

Record companies such as Discos Ideal established in San Benito, Texas in 1947 and Freddie Records established in Corpus Christi, Texas in 1970 are among the most prolific in producing conjunto style music. Freddie Records, named after founder, Freddie Martinez, Sr. has remained a key figure in the production of Tejano music well into the 21st century.

== Influence ==
The term "Tex-Mex" is also used in American rock and roll for Tejano-influenced performers such as the Sir Douglas Quintet and the Texas Tornados (featuring Flaco Jiménez, Freddy Fender, Augie Meyers, and Doug Sahm), Los Super Seven, Sam the Sham and the Pharaohs, Los Lobos, Latin Playboys, Louie and the Lovers, The Champs, Ry Cooder, Calexico, Los Lonely Boys, The Mavericks, Son de Rey, and Selena y Los Dinos.

Texan accordion music has also influenced Basque trikitixa players.

Contemporary Swedish-American composer Sven-David Sandström has incorporated Tejano stylings in his classical music.

Tejano and conjunto music is so popular that organizations such as the Guadalupe Arts Center in San Antonio, Texas hold annual festivals every year. The performers have included legends such as Flaco Jiménez, conjunto groups from around the world, and contemporary artists. Dutch accordionist Dwayne Verheyden played on stage with Jimenez. Jimenez claims, “there are many imitators and sound- a-likes, but none can compare to Dwayne Verheyden; and he’s from the Netherlands.”

== See also ==
- Carlos Santana
- Chicano rap
- Chicano rock
- Chulas Fronteras (1976 film)
- Latin American music
- Latin Grammy Award for Best Tejano Album
- Latin music
- Music of Texas
- Tejano Music Awards
