= BBC Music =

Corporate division

- Industry: Mass media
- Founded: 2014
- Headquarters: Broadcasting House, London, United Kingdom
- Area served: United Kingdom
- Key people: Lorna Clarke (Director of Music)
- Services: Radio and TV broadcasting, online services, event organisation
- Parent: British Broadcasting Corporation
- Website: bbc.co.uk/music

BBC Music is the arm of the BBC responsible for the music played across its services. The current director of music is Lorna Clarke.

Officially it is a part of the BBC's Radio operational division; however, its remit also includes music used in television and online services. It was established in its current form in 2014; however, the BBC had already been using the BBC Music brand to refer to its online music content and some live events beforehand, including a now-defunct record label.

== Launch ==
BBC Music had its official launch at 20:00 on 7 October 2014, with a simulcast of a specially-commissioned cover of the Beach Boys' 1966 song "God Only Knows". Produced by Ethan Johns, it featured a supergroup of singers such as Chris Martin (of Coldplay), Stevie Wonder, Kylie Minogue, Dave Grohl (of Foo Fighters), Elton John, Pharrell Williams, One Direction, and Brian Wilson (The Beach Boys) accompanied by the BBC Concert Orchestra. It was released as a single and reached number 20 in the UK Singles Chart.

== Responsibilities ==
BBC Music is responsible for the music played across the BBC. It has direct editorial control of the music content of the BBC's six national music radio stations Radio 1, 1Xtra, Radio 2, Radio 3, 6 Music, and the BBC Asian Network, as well as organising live music events for each of the stations. These include Radio 1's Big Weekend, Live in Hyde Park and In Concert for Radio 2, the BBC Proms (including the various "Proms in the Park" events), and the BBC 6 Music festival.

Many of the BBC televisual music programmes and documentaries are now co-produced with BBC Music, with a BBC Music ident often being played between the regular channel ident and the start of the programme. It will also coordinate the BBC's coverage of other live music events such as the Glastonbury Festival, T in the Park, the Reading and Leeds Festivals, and Celtic Connections amongst others.

It is responsible for the BBC's online music database, collating every music track played across the BBC's national radio stations and a larger amount of the music played on the BBC's UK television channels.

This included looking after My Tracks, formerly BBC Playlister, an interactive, personalisable music service that allowed users to create playlists of music that had been played across the BBC using existing online platforms Deezer, YouTube and Spotify. It also featured playlists created by BBC radio DJs and presenters such as Jo Whiley, Greg James, Steve Lamacq, Zane Lowe, and Fearne Cotton. This service was discontinued due to low usage.

Additionally, it coordinates the production of the BBC Music Awards and also oversees BBC Introducing, an initiative to get less well-known and unsigned artists played on local and national radio.

== See also ==
- BBC Records
- BBC Music Magazine
- BBC Sounds
