= Give Give Give =

Single by Dance Aid
- Released: 1986
- Recorded: 1986 (original); 1987 (rework)
- Genre: Dance-pop
- Length: 3:44 (7" Version); 7:21 (12" Version)
- Label: Total Control Records, Supreme Records
- Songwriter(s): Steve MacIntosh
- Producer(s): Paul Hardcastle (original); Stock Aitken Waterman (rework)

"Give Give Give" is a 1986 charity single by Dance Aid, a supergroup of British soul artists. This was done to support multiple sclerosis research.

== Background ==
The late British DJ and personality Steve Walsh was influenced by Band Aid's "Do They Know It's Christmas?" and USA for Africa's "We Are the World", for those hits became a very fashionable vehicle of raising money and awareness. Walsh contacted Steve MacIntosh of the Cool Notes about creating a charity supergroup to make a similar charity record for the UK to support multiple sclerosis research.

MacIntosh wrote the song "Give, Give, Give" and asked Paul Hardcastle to produce the song with him. Walsh and Hardcastle sent MacIntosh a demo of the song and it was then agreed to use the song to move ahead with the project. Phil Fearon, MacIntosh's the Cool Notes, Mel & Kim and Hazell Dean were some of the British dance and soul acts involved, alongside comedian Lenny Henry. American acts such as Jean Carne, Odyssey, Steve Mancha, Kenny G and Edwin Starr also took part.

The first version was released in the autumn of 1986 under the name Disco Aid. It was a minor hit on the UK Singles Chart, peaking at No. 85.

In 1987, the song was re-produced together with British producers Stock Aitken Waterman. This time it was released under the act name Dance Aid. Other participants included Sinitta, Ruby Turner and Pepsi & Shirlie. It failed to chart in the UK, but was a top 40 hit in Belgium.

== Track listing ==
12" vinyl

1. "Give, Give, Give" (Extended Mix) - 5:39
2. "Give, Give, Give" (7" Mix) - 3:55
3. "Give, Give, Give" (Instrumental) - 3:57

7" vinyl

1. "Give Give Give" - 3:55
2. "Give Give Give" (Instrumental) - 3:59

Dance Aid version:

12" vinyl

1. "Give Give Give" (12" Version) - 7:21
2. "Give Give Give" (7" Version) - 3:44
3. "Give Give Give" (Senza Voce) - 4:39

7" vinyl

1. "Give Give Give" (7" Version) - 3:44
2. "Give Give Give" (Senza Voce) - 4:39

== Chart performance ==
Chart (1986)	Peak position
UK Singles	85
Chart (1988)	Peak position
Belgium (Ultratop 50 Flanders)	33
