= Charity supergroup =

Group of famous musicians formed to raise funds or awareness

A charity supergroup is a music group comprising famous musicians or other celebrities which is formed to raise funds or awareness for charities or causes. The supergroup is usually together only for a single album, performance, or single.

The concept dates to at least 1971, when George Harrison and Ravi Shankar organized The Concert for Bangladesh, and a subsequent album and film, to support UNICEF relief efforts in that country. In the 1980s, forming a one-off supergroup to record a charity single became a popular way to promote a cause; notable examples include Band Aid's "Do They Know It's Christmas?" in 1984 and USA for Africa's "We Are the World" in 1985, both recorded to support famine relief in Ethiopia.

== List of notable charity supergroups ==
Founded	Band/project name	Project co-ordinator(s)	Notes
1971	The Concert for Bangladesh	George Harrison; Ravi Shankar	Concert to raise awareness of the Bangladesh Liberation War and refugee problems in the country, raised funds to benefit UNICEF relief fund, released a film of the concert and an album, The Concert for Bangla Desh
1979	Rockestra	Paul McCartney	Recorded "Let It Be", "Lucille", "Rockestra Theme", and "So Glad to See You Here" at the Concerts for the People of Kampuchea, to benefit people of Cambodia suffering from Pol Pot's regime; released as a promotional EP and film
1983	ARMS Charity Concert	Ronnie Lane	Concert at Royal Albert Hall to support multiple sclerosis research
1984	Band Aid	Bob Geldof; Midge Ure	Recorded "Do They Know It's Christmas?" charity single for famine relief in Ethiopia
1985	Deep End	Pete Townshend (The Who); David Gilmour (Pink Floyd); Jody Linscott (Elton John, Eric Clapton); John 'Rabbit' Bundrick (The Who); Billy Nicholls; Simon Phillips (Toto, The Who); Chucho Merchan; Cleveland Watkiss; Chyna; Emma Townshend	Recorded "Deep End Live!"
1985	Northern Lights	Bruce Allen	Recorded the charity single "Tears Are Not Enough" for famine relief in Ethiopia
1985	USA for Africa	Harry Belafonte; Michael Jackson; Quincy Jones; Lionel Richie; Kenny Rogers; Tina Turner; Diana Ross	Recorded "We Are the World" charity single for famine relief in Ethiopia
1985	Hermanos	Julio Iglesias	Recorded "Cantaré, cantarás" charity single for famine relief in Ethiopia
1985	Tomorrow will be Better	Lo Ta-yu	Recorded "Tomorrow will be Better" to raise money for World Vision to help with aid to Africa.
1985	YU Rock Misija (Yugoslav Rock Mission)	Vlatko Stefanovski; Željko Bebek; Marina Perazić; Momčilo Bajagić; Aki Rahimovski; Slađana Milošević; Dado Topić; Massimo Savić	Recorded "Za Milion Godina (For Million Years)" contribution of the former Socialist Federal Republic of Yugoslavia to the famous Bob Geldof's Band Aid famine relief campaign
1985	Hear 'n Aid	Ronnie James Dio	Recorded the charity single and album "Stars" for famine relief in Africa
1985	Artists United Against Apartheid	Steven Van Zandt	Recorded the song and album "Sun City" to protest apartheid in South Africa
1985/1986	Dionne and Friends	Dionne Warwick; Gladys Knight; Elton John; Stevie Wonder	Recorded the song "That's What Friends Are For" as a charity single for the United Kingdom in 1985 and the United States in 1986 for American Foundation for AIDS Research.
1986	Dance Aid	Steve Walsh; Steve McIntosh; Paul Hardcastle	Recorded the song "Give Give Give" as a charity single for the United Kingdom in 1986.
1987	Ferry Aid	The Sun newspaper	Recorded the song "Let it Be" as a charity single following the Zeebrugge disaster
1989	Concert for Democracy in China	James Wong; Phillip Chan; Eric Tsang; John Shum	Benefit concert held in Hong Kong in support of the students involved in the 1989 Tiananmen Square protests
1989/1990	Rock Aid Armenia	Jon Dee	Re-recording of "Smoke on the Water" by Ritchie Blackmore, Bruce Dickinson, Geoff Downes, Keith Emerson, Ian Gillan, David Gilmour, Tony Iommi, Alex Lifeson, Brian May, Paul Rodgers, Chris Squire, Roger Taylor and others
1989	Band Aid II	Bob Geldof; Midge Ure	Re-recording of "Do They Know It's Christmas?" charity single, also for famine relief in Ethiopia
1989	Singers for Sight	Retinitis Pigmentosa International	Song "Forgotten Eyes" was recorded with older celebrities including Bob Hope, Sammy Davis Jr, Dionne Warwick, Mel Torme, Jack Jones, Marilyn McCoo, Patti LaBelle, George Burns, and Kareem Abdul-Jabbar. It was released on Motown.
1991	Voices That Care	David Foster; Linda Thompson; Peter Cetera	Recording of "Voices That Care" charity single, also for U.S. troops involved in Operation Desert Storm, as well as supporting the International Red Cross organization
1992	Rock Bottom Remainders	Kathi Kamen Goldmark; Dave Barry; Stephen King; several others	Group of well-known writers, several charity concerts
1994	Music Relief '94	C. J. Lewis; Andrew Roachford; Yazz; Aswad; Edwin Starr; D Ream; Kim Appleby; Rozalla; Tony Di Bart; Paul Young	Recorded a cover version of Marvin Gaye's single "What's Going On" in memory of the Rwandan genocide.
1997	Perfect Day	BBC Music; Lou Reed	Recording of "Perfect Day" originally used as an advertisement for BBC Music. Due to popularity it was released as a charity single raising over £2 million for Children in Need
2001	Artists Against Aids Worldwide	Jermaine Dupri; Bono	Recorded several cover versions of "What's Going On" to benefit AIDS programs in Africa and other impoverished regions, with a portion of the proceeds going to the American Red Cross' September 11 fund
2004	Band Aid 20	Bob Geldof; Midge Ure	Re-recording of "Do They Know It's Christmas?" 20th anniversary charity single, for famine relief in Ethiopia
2005	The North American Hallowe'en Prevention Initiative (NAHPI)		An all star cast of rock artists recorded a satire of the song "Do They Know It's Christmas?" named Do They Know It's Hallowe'en?, all proceeds being donated to UNICEF.
2005	One World Project		Recorded the charity single "Grief Never Grows Old" to benefit 2004 Indian Ocean tsunami relief
2005	Tears in Heaven	Ozzy Osbourne; Sharon Osbourne	Recording of "Tears in Heaven" to benefit 2004 Indian Ocean tsunami relief
2008	S↑2C Stand Up 2 Cancer telethon	Katie Couric; Entertainment Industry Foundation	Recorded the charity single "Just Stand Up!" to benefit the Stand Up To Cancer telethon.
2009	Peter Kay's Animated All Star Band	Peter Kay	UK children's characters recorded the charity single "The Official BBC Children in Need Medley" to benefit Children in Need 2009.
2010	Artists for Haiti	Quincy Jones; Lionel Richie	Recorded "We Are the World 25 for Haiti", a remake of the original "We Are the World", to benefit the people of Haiti after the 2010 earthquake.
2010	Young Artists for Haiti	Bob Ezrin; K'naan	Canadian singers and musicians who recorded K'naan's song "Wavin' Flag" to benefit the people of Haiti after the 2010 earthquake.
2011	WhoCares	Ian Gillan (Deep Purple); Tony Iommi (Black Sabbath); Jason Newsted (Metallica); Jon Lord (Deep Purple); Nicko McBrain (Iron Maiden); Mikko Lindström (HIM)	Raising funds to support the rebuilding of a music school in Gyumri, Armenia.
2011	BackBone	Meat Loaf; John Rich (Big & Rich); Lil Jon (lil Jon & The East Side Boyz); Mark McGrath (Sugar Ray)	Singers and Musicians on The Celebrity Apprentice 4, all proceeds from their songs go to their respective charities that they chose on the show.
2012	The Justice Collective	Peter Hooton (The Farm)	Recorded "He Ain't Heavy, He's My Brother", in aid of charities associated with the Hillsborough disaster of 1989.
2014	The Impossible Orchestra	BBC Music	Organised for Children in Need 2014 to record "God Only Knows"
2014	Band Aid 30	Bob Geldof; Midge Ure	Re-recording of "Do They Know It's Christmas?" 30th anniversary charity single, for Ebola Crisis Appeal.
2014	Africa Stop Ebola	Tiken Jah Fakoly; Salif Keita; Amadou & Mariam; Mory Kanté; Oumou Sangaré; Sia Tolno; Barbara Kanam; Mokobé; Marcus (from the band Banlieuz'Arts); Didier Awadi; Carlos Chirinos; 3D Family	West African artists recorded the song "Africa Stop Ebola" to raise awareness about Ebola in West Africa and released in France to support Médecins Sans Frontières (MSF). The song inspired the "Africa Stop Ebola" Song Contest in Conakry, Guinea in July 2015. Africa Stop Ebola was the recipient of the "Fighting Ebola: a Grand Challenge for Development" award by the White House Office of Science and Technology, the Centers for Disease Control, the Department of Defense and the United States Agency for International Development USAID.
2014	Imagine	UNICEF; Ban Ki-moon; David Guetta	Recording of "Imagine" to commemorate the 25th anniversary of the Convention on the Rights of the Child.
2017	Artists for Puerto Rico	Lin-Manuel Miranda	American songwriter of Puerto Rican descent, Lin-Manuel Miranda wrote and recorded the song Almost Like Praying featuring numerous other artists under the collective name Artists for Puerto Rico to support relief efforts in Puerto Rico in response to Hurricane Maria, which struck the island in September 2017.
2019	—	Lil Dicky	American rapper and comedian Lil Dicky invites 30 artists and they all recorded "Earth" for Earth Day.
2020	Live Lounge Allstars	5 Seconds of Summer; AJ Tracey; Anne-Marie; Bastille; Biffy Clyro; Celeste; Chris Martin (of Coldplay); Dermot Kennedy; Dua Lipa; Ellie Goulding; Grace Carter; Hailee Steinfeld; Jess Glynne; Mabel; Paloma Faith; Rag’n’Bone Man; Rita Ora; Royal Blood; Sam Fender; Sean Paul; Sigrid; Yungblud; Zara Larsson	Recorded a cover version of Foo Fighters' "Times Like These" to raise funds for Children in Need, Comic Relief and the COVID-19 Solidarity Response Fund during the COVID-19 pandemic.

== See also ==
- Supergroup (music)
- Charity record
- Band Aid
- USA for Africa
