= We Are the World =

1985 charity song

Single by USA for Africa

from the album We Are the World
- B-side: "Grace"
- Released: March 7, 1985
- Recorded: January 28, 1985
- Studio: A&M (Hollywood); Lion Share (Los Angeles)
- Genre: Pop; gospel
- Length: 7:02 (album version); 6:22 (single version)
- Label: Columbia; CBS
- Songwriters: Michael Jackson; Lionel Richie
- Producer: Quincy Jones

Music video
- "We Are The World" on YouTube

"We Are the World" is a charity single recorded by the supergroup USA for Africa in 1985. It was written by Michael Jackson and Lionel Richie and produced by Quincy Jones for the album We Are the World to raise money for the 1983–1985 famine in Ethiopia. With sales in excess of 20 million physical copies, it is the eighth-best-selling single of all time.

After the British group Band Aid released the charity single "Do They Know It's Christmas?" in 1984, the musician and activist Harry Belafonte decided to create an American single for African famine relief. The agent Ken Kragen enlisted several musicians for the project. Jackson and Richie completed the writing the night before the first recording session on January 28, 1985. The recording brought together some of the era's best-known recording artists, including Bruce Springsteen, Cyndi Lauper, Paul Simon, Stevie Wonder, and Tina Turner.

"We Are the World" was released on March 7, 1985, by Columbia Records. It topped music charts throughout the world, became the fastest-selling US pop single in history and the first single to be certified multi-platinum, and was certified quadruple platinum. Its awards include four Grammy Awards, one American Music Award, and a People's Choice Award.

"We Are the World" was promoted with a music video, a VHS, a special edition magazine, a simulcast, and books, posters and shirts. It raised more than $80 million (equivalent to $235 million in 2025) for humanitarian aid in Africa and the United States. Another cast of singers recorded a new version, "We Are the World 25 for Haiti", following the 2010 Haiti earthquake.

== Background ==
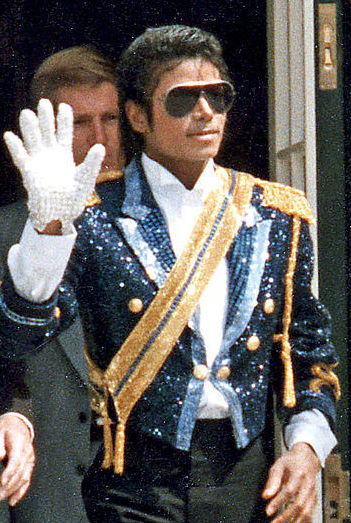
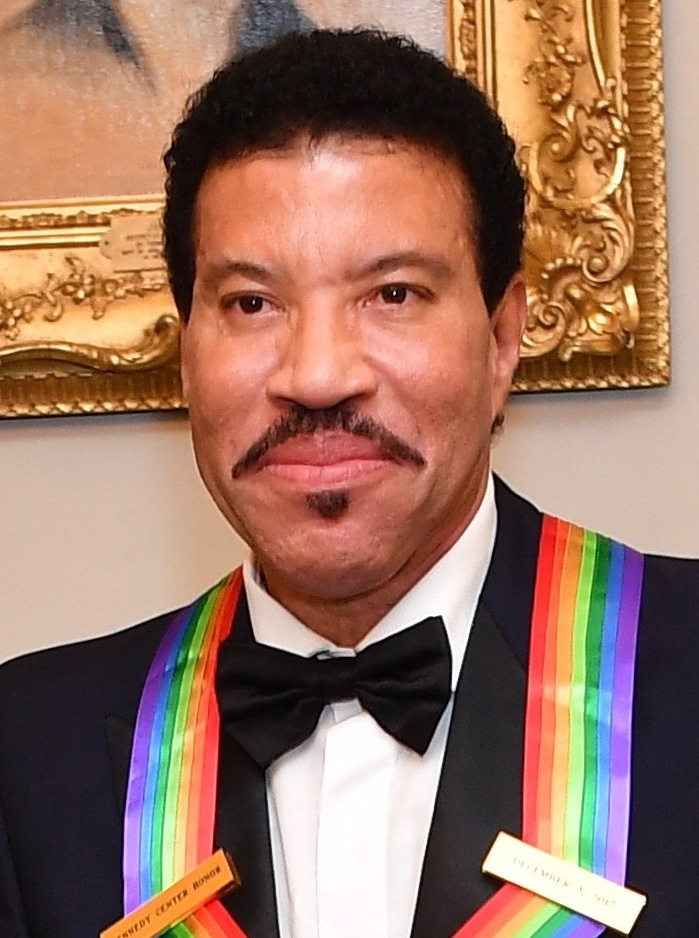
Michael Jackson (left) and Lionel Richie (right) wrote the song.

In 1985, inspired by Band Aid's "Do They Know It's Christmas?" in the UK, the American entertainer and activist Harry Belafonte decided to organize a US equivalent. He planned to have the proceeds donated to a new organization, United Support of Artists for Africa (USA for Africa). The organization would provide food and relief aid for the 1983–1985 famine in Ethiopia, which killed about one million people. Belafonte also planned to set aside money to help eliminate hunger in the US.

Belafonte contacted the entertainment manager and fundraiser Ken Kragen, who enlisted his clients Lionel Richie and Kenny Rogers. In turn, they enlisted Stevie Wonder to add more "name value". Quincy Jones was drafted to co-produce, taking time out from his work on the film The Color Purple. Jones also telephoned Michael Jackson, who had just concluded Victory Tour with the Jacksons.

== Writing ==
Jackson told Richie that he wanted to help write the song. The songwriting team originally included Wonder, but his time was constrained by his songwriting for the film The Woman in Red. Jackson and Richie wrote "We Are the World" at Hayvenhurst, the Jackson family home in Encino, California. They sought to write a song that would be easy to sing, memorable and anthemic. For a week, they spent every night working on lyrics and melodies in Jackson's bedroom. Jackson's older sister La Toya recounted: "I'd go into the room while they were writing and it would be very quiet, which is odd, since Michael's usually very cheery when he works. It was very emotional for them." She said later that Jackson wrote most of the lyrics.

Richie recorded two melodies, to which Jackson added music on the same day. Jackson said, "I love working quickly. I went ahead without even Lionel knowing. I couldn't wait. I went in and came out the same night with the song completed: drums, piano, strings, and words to the chorus." Jackson presented his demo to Richie and Jones, who were both surprised that he had completed the structure so quickly. The next meetings between Jackson and Richie were unproductive. On January 21, 1985, the night before the first recording session, Richie and Jackson completed the lyrics and melody.

== Recording ==
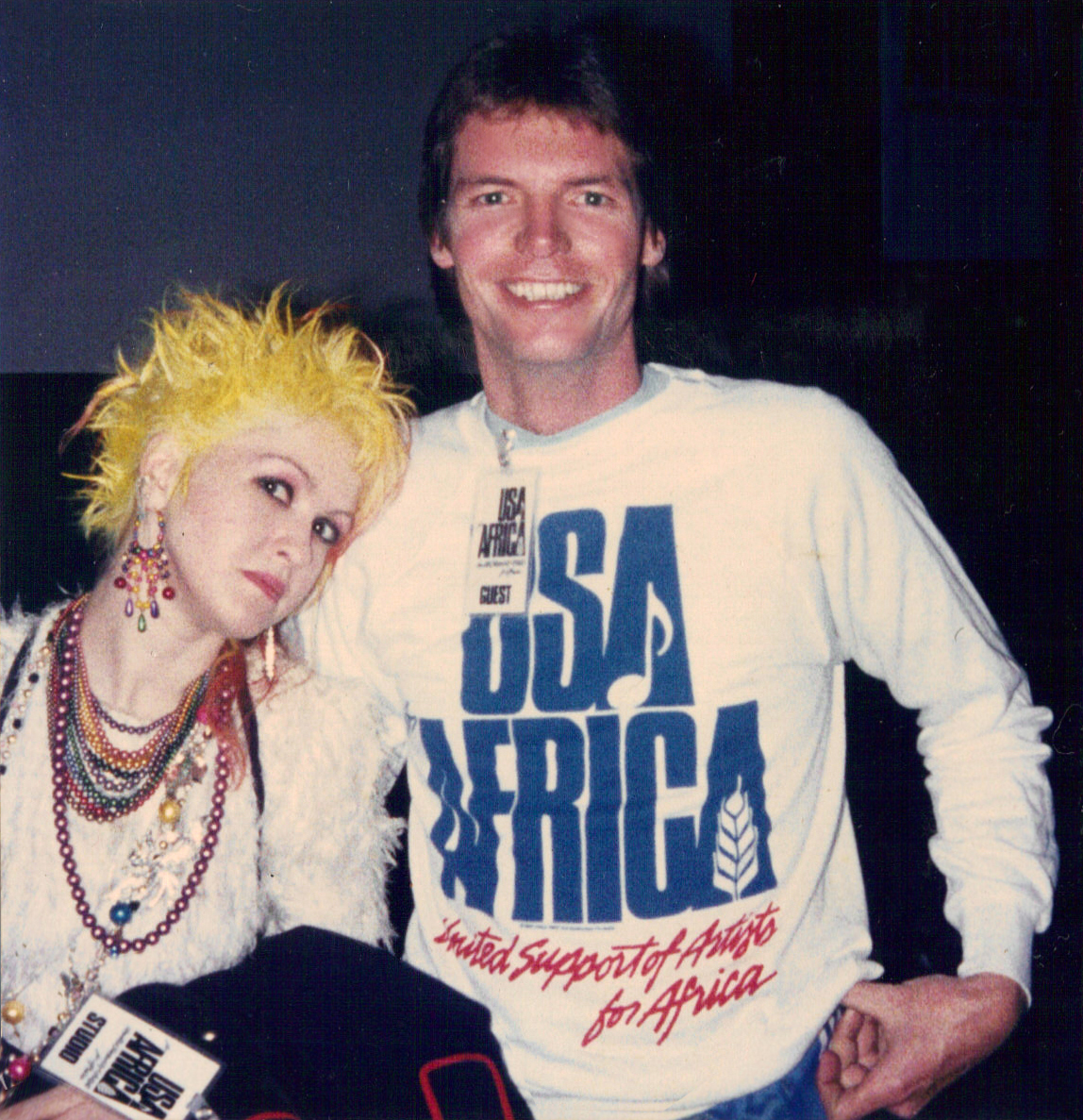
Cyndi Lauper, studio badge, and the sweatshirt given to all attendees at A&M Studios in Hollywood, California on January 28, 1985

Recording began on January 22, 1985, at Kenny Rogers' Lion Share Recording Studio on Beverly Boulevard in Los Angeles. The first day included Richie, Jackson, Wonder, and Jones, along with the session musicians Jones had hired to lay down the backing tracks: John "JR" Robinson on drums, Louis Johnson on bass, and Greg Phillinganes on piano. The three had first played together on Jackson's 1979 single "Don't Stop 'Til You Get Enough", produced by Jones. Despite tight security, the studio was filled with the musicians, technicians, video crews, retinue, assistants, and organizers.

Richie sat at the piano to teach everyone the song. When it was time to record, Robinson cleared the room of non-musicians. The session musicians recorded the backing tracks, then Richie and Jackson recorded a vocal guide. Jones selected the sixth take of the guide—he felt there was too much "thought" in the previous versions—and had it mixed with the instrumental tracks. A cassette tape duplicate was made for each of the performers invited to the vocal recording sessions.

After the initial recording, Jackson and Jones began thinking of alternatives for the line "There's a chance we're taking, we're taking our own lives". The pair was concerned that line would be considered a reference to suicide. As the group listened to a playback of the chorus, Richie declared that the last part of the line should be changed to "We're 'saving' our own lives". Jones also suggested altering the former part of the line. "One thing we don't want to do, especially with this group, is look like we're patting ourselves on the back. So it's really: 'There's a choice we're making.'" Around 1:30 am, the musicians ended the night by finishing a chorus of melodic vocalizations, including the sound "sha-lum sha-lin-gay". Jones told the group that they were not to add anything else to the tape, and said: "If we get too good, someone's gonna start playing it on the radio."

On January 24, 1985, after a day of rest, Jones shipped Richie and Jackson's vocal guide to all the artists who would be involved the recording. Enclosed in the package was a letter from Jones imploring the artists not to share the tape or make copies. He wrote: "In the years to come, when your children ask, 'What did mommy and daddy do for the war against world famine?', you can say proudly, this was your contribution."

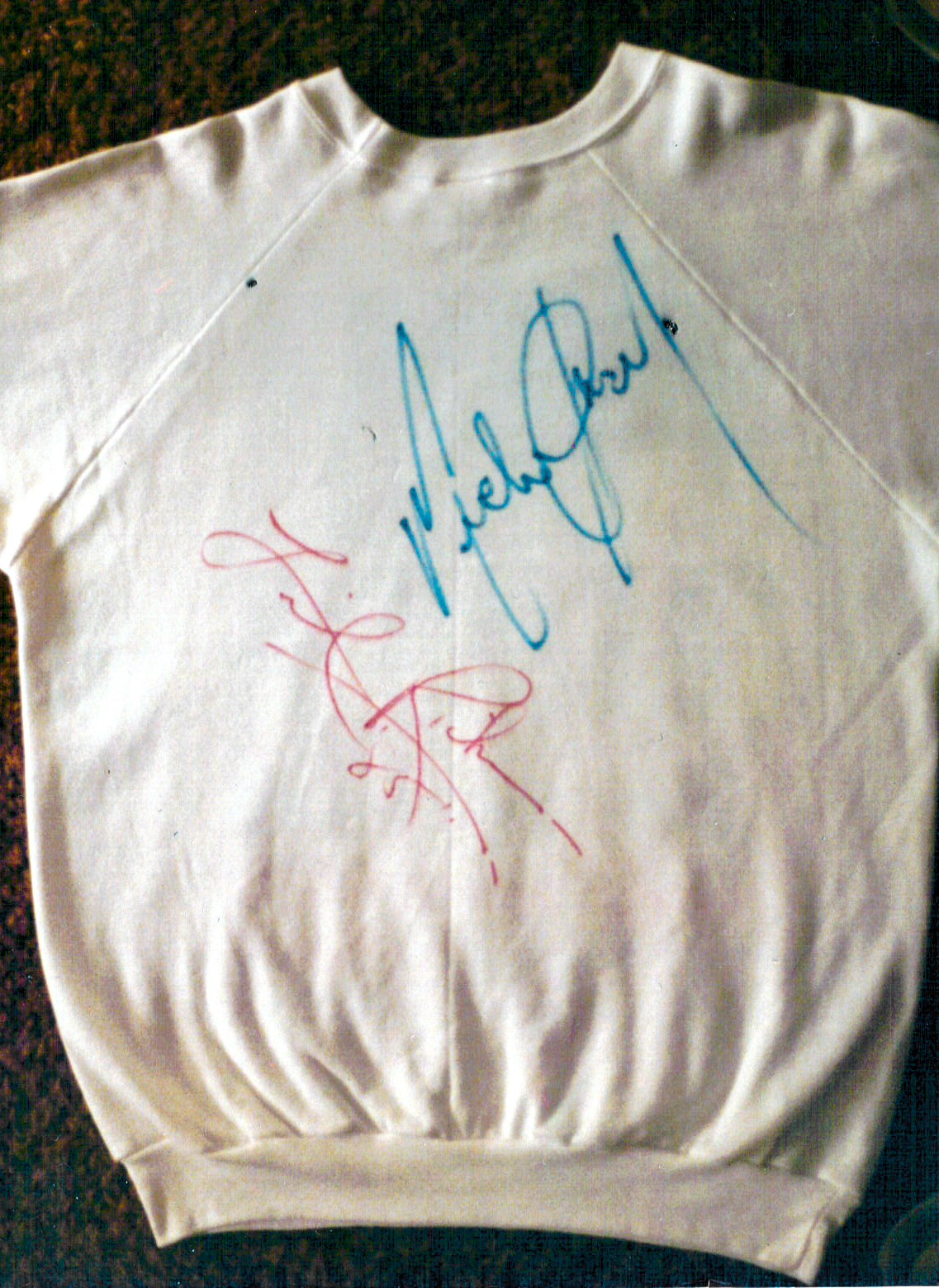
Back of the "We Are the World" sweater autographed by Michael Jackson and Lionel Richie

Kragen chaired a production meeting at a bungalow off Sunset Boulevard on January 25, 1985. His team discussed where the recording sessions should take place. Kragen was concerned that a leak of the location would trigger a paparazzi frenzy and drive the celebrities away. Jones was concerned about assigning performers to sing solos, saying that so much talent on hand made the task like "putting a watermelon in a Coke bottle". The following evening, Richie held a choreography session at his home, where it was decided who would stand where.

The final night of recording was held on January 28, 1985, at A&M Recording Studios in Hollywood. Jackson arrived at 8 p.m., earlier than the others, to record his solo section and record a vocal chorus alone. He was joined by the remaining artists, who included Ray Charles, Billy Joel, Diana Ross, Cyndi Lauper, Bruce Springsteen and Tina Turner, and Jackson's siblings Jackie, La Toya, Marlon, Randy and Tito. Many of the participants came from an American Music Awards ceremony held that night.

Prince, who would have had a part in which he and Michael Jackson sang to each other, did not attend. One newspaper said that Prince did not want to record with other acts; another report, from the time of the recording, suggested that he did not want to partake because the organizer, Bob Geldof, called him a "creep". During the session, Richie spoke with Prince on the phone, and declined Prince's offer to play a guitar solo in a separate room. Instead, Prince donated an exclusive track, "4 the Tears in Your Eyes", to the We Are the World album.

Wonder asked Eddie Murphy to participate, but Murphy declined because he was busy recording his single "Party All the Time". Murphy later said he "felt like an idiot" for not participating. John Denver asked to participate, but was refused despite his previous commitment to charity work. According to Kragen, some felt that Denver's image would affect the credibility of the song as a pop-rock anthem; Kragen disagreed, but reluctantly turned him down. In his 1994 autobiography Take Me Home, Denver wrote that the rejection "broke my heart".

More than 45 of America's top musicians participated, and another 50 had to be turned away. A sign taped to the studio door read: "Check your ego at the door." Wonder greeted the musicians as they entered, and said that if the recording was not completed in one take, he and Ray Charles, two blind men, would drive everybody home.

I think what's happening in Africa is a crime of historic proportions ... You walk into one of the corrugated iron huts and you see meningitis and malaria and typhoid buzzing around in the air. And you see dead bodies lying side by side with the live ones ... In some of the camps you see 15 bags of flour for 27,500 people. And it's that that we're here for.

— Bob Geldof, addressing his fellow USA for Africa musicians during one of the recording sessions of "We Are the World" on January 28, 1985

Each performer took their position at around 10:30 p.m. and began to sing. Several hours passed before Wonder announced that he would like to substitute a line in Swahili for the "sha-lum sha-lin-gay" sound. This prompted Waylon Jennings to leave the session. Jennings had already grown frustrated upon arriving on set and finding Bruce Springsteen ready in hair and makeup, accompanied by a camera crew. He believed that the event placed more emphasis on the performers’ appearances than on the charitable cause it was actually intended to support. A heated debate ensued, in which several artists also rejected the suggestion. The "sha-lum sha-lin-gay" sound ran into opposition as well and was removed. Jennings returned and participated. The participants eventually decided to sing something meaningful in English. They chose to sing the new line "one world, our children", which most of the participants enjoyed.

In the early hours of the morning, two Ethiopian women, guests of Wonder, were brought in. They thanked the singers on behalf of their country, bringing several artists to tears. Wonder attempted to lighten the mood, by joking that the recording session gave him a chance to "see" Charles, saying, "We just sort of bumped into each other!" Under the circumstances, the solo parts presented a variety of challenges, but were all successfully recorded that night. The final version was completed at 8 a.m.

== Lyrics ==
"We Are the World"
The structuring of "We Are the World" is said to "create a sense of continuous surprise and emotional buildup".

"We Are the World" is sung from a first-person viewpoint, allowing the audience to "internalize" the message by singing the word we together. It has been described as "an appeal to human compassion". The first lines of the chorus are: "We are the world, we are the children / we are the ones who make a brighter day / so let's start giving".

== Arrangement ==
Lionel Richie, Stevie Wonder, Paul Simon, Kenny Rogers, James Ingram, Tina Turner and Billy Joel sang the first verse; Michael Jackson and Diana Ross sang the first chorus; Dionne Warwick, Willie Nelson and Al Jarreau sang the second verse; Bruce Springsteen, Kenny Loggins, Steve Perry and Daryl Hall sang the second chorus; Jackson, Huey Lewis, Cyndi Lauper, and Kim Carnes sang the bridge. The structure is said to "create a sense of continuous surprise and emotional buildup".

The following people sang in the chorus: Dan Aykroyd, Harry Belafonte, Lindsey Buckingham, Mario Cipollina, Johnny Colla, Sheila E., Bob Geldof, Bill Gibson, Chris Hayes, Sean Hopper, Jackie Jackson, La Toya Jackson, Marlon Jackson, Randy Jackson, Tito Jackson, Waylon Jennings, Bette Midler, John Oates, Jeffrey Osborne, Anita Pointer, June Pointer, Ruth Pointer, and Smokey Robinson.

== USA for Africa musicians ==
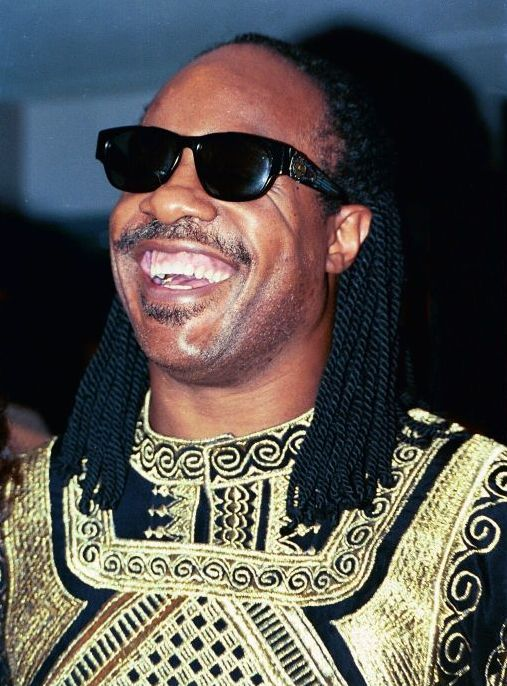
Stevie Wonder was a featured soloist.

Conductor
• Quincy Jones

Soloists (in order of appearance)
• Lionel Richie
• Stevie Wonder
• Paul Simon
• Kenny Rogers
• James Ingram
• Tina Turner
• Billy Joel
• Michael Jackson
• Diana Ross
• Dionne Warwick
• Willie Nelson
• Al Jarreau
• Bruce Springsteen
• Kenny Loggins
• Steve Perry
• Daryl Hall
• Huey Lewis
• Cyndi Lauper
• Kim Carnes
• Bob Dylan
• Ray Charles

Chorus (alphabetically)
• Dan Aykroyd
• Harry Belafonte
• Lindsey Buckingham
• Mario Cipollina (of Huey Lewis and the News)
• Johnny Colla (of Huey Lewis and the News)
• Sheila E.
• Bob Geldof
• Bill Gibson (of Huey Lewis and the News)
• Chris Hayes (of Huey Lewis and the News)
• Sean Hopper (of Huey Lewis and the News)
• Jackie Jackson
• La Toya Jackson
• Marlon Jackson
• Randy Jackson
• Tito Jackson
• Waylon Jennings
• Bette Midler
• John Oates
• Jeffrey Osborne
• Anita Pointer (of the Pointer Sisters)
• June Pointer (of the Pointer Sisters)
• Ruth Pointer (of the Pointer Sisters)
• Smokey Robinson

Instrument players
• John Barnes – keyboards, programming, arrangement
• David Paich – synthesizers
• Michael Boddicker – synthesizers, programming
• Ian Underwood – synthesizers, programming
| • Steve Porcaro – synthesizers, programming |
• Paulinho da Costa – percussion
• Louis Johnson – bass
• Michael Omartian – keyboards
• Greg Phillinganes – keyboards
• John Robinson – drums

== Release ==
On March 7, 1985, "We Are the World" was released as a single, in both 7-inch and 12-inch formats. The song was the only one released from the We Are the World album and became a chart success around the world. In the U.S., it was a number-one hit on the R&B singles chart, the Hot Adult Contemporary Tracks chart, and the Billboard Hot 100, where it remained for a month. The single had debuted at number 21 on the Hot 100, and it took four weeks for the song to claim the number one spot, half the time a single would normally have taken to reach its charting peak. On the Hot 100, the song moved from 21 to 5 to 2 and then number 1. It was the only number 1 single on the Hot 100 for Bob Dylan, Bruce Springsteen, Willie Nelson, Al Jarreau, Steve Perry, Harry Belafonte, Bob Geldof, Waylon Jennings, Jeffrey Osborne, Sheila E., The Pointer Sisters, Randy Jackson, and La Toya Jackson, as well as actor-comedian Dan Aykroyd. "We Are the World" might have reached the top of the Hot 100 chart sooner, were it not for the success of Phil Collins' "One More Night", which received support from both pop and rock listeners. "We Are the World" also entered Billboard's Top Rock Tracks and Hot Country Singles charts, where it peaked at numbers 27 and 76 respectively. The song became the first single since the Beatles' "Let It Be" to enter Billboard's Top 5 within two weeks of release. Outside the U.S., the single reached number one in Australia, France, Ireland, New Zealand, The Netherlands, Norway, Spain, Sweden, Switzerland and the UK. The song peaked at number 2 in two countries: Germany and Austria.

The single was also a commercial success: the initial shipment of 800,000 "We Are the World" records sold out within three days of release. The record became the fastest-selling American pop single in history. At Tower Records in West Hollywood, 1,000 copies of the song were sold in two days. Store worker Richard Petitpas commented, "A number one single sells about 100 to 125 copies a week. This is absolutely unheard of." By the end of 1985, "We Are the World" had become the year's best-selling single. Five years later it was revealed that the song had become the biggest single of the 1980s. "We Are the World" was eventually cited as the best-selling single in U.S. and pop music history. (Note: Elton John's 1997 version of "Candle in the Wind"—a tribute to Diana, Princess of Wales—later claimed the status of biggest selling pop single of all time.) The song became the first single to be certified multi-platinum; it received a 4× certification by the Recording Industry Association of America for shipments of 8 million copies. The estimated global sales of "We Are the World" are said to be 14-20 million.

== Reception ==
"We Are the World" received mixed reviews. American journalist Greil Marcus felt that it sounded like a Pepsi jingle. He wrote that "the constant repetition of 'There's a choice we're making' conflates with Pepsi's trademarked 'The choice of a new generation' in a way that, on the part of Pepsi-contracted song writers Michael Jackson and Lionel Richie, is certainly not intentional, and even more certainly beyond the realm of serendipity." Marcus added, "In the realm of contextualization, 'We Are the World' says less about Ethiopia than it does about Pepsi—and the true result will likely be less that certain Ethiopian individuals will live, or anyway live a bit longer than they otherwise would have, than that Pepsi will get the catch phrase of its advertising campaign sung for free by Ray Charles, Stevie Wonder, Bruce Springsteen, and all the rest." Professor and activist Reebee Garofalo agreed, calling the line "We're saving our own lives" a "distasteful element of self-indulgence". He asserted that the artists of USA for Africa were proclaiming "their own salvation for singing about an issue they will never experience on behalf of a people most of them will never encounter".

In contrast, Stephen Holden of The New York Times praised the phrase "There's a choice we're making, We're saving our own lives". He wrote that the line assumed "an extra emotional dimension when sung by people with superstar mystiques". Holden wrote that the song was "an artistic triumph that transcends its official nature". He noted that unlike Band Aid's "Do They Know It's Christmas", the vocals on "We Are the World" were "artfully interwoven" and emphasized the individuality of each singer. Holden concluded that "We Are the World" was "a simple, eloquent ballad" and a "fully-realized pop statement that would sound outstanding even if it weren't recorded by stars".

The song proved popular with both young and old listeners. People in Columbia, Missouri reported they bought more than one copy of the single, some buying up to five copies of the record at one time.

According to the music critic and Springsteen biographer Dave Marsh, "We Are the World" was not widely accepted within the rock music community. Marsh said it was dismissed as it was not "a rock record, a critique of the political policies that created the famine, a way of finding out how and why famines occur, an all-inclusive representation of the entire worldwide spectrum of post-Presley popular music". Though Marsh agreed with some of the criticisms, he felt that, despite its sentimentality, "We Are the World" was a large-scale pop event with serious political overtones.

"We Are the World" was recognized with several awards following its release. At the 1986 Grammy Awards, the song and its music video won four awards: Record of the Year, Song of the Year, Best Pop Performance by a Duo or Group with Vocal and Best Music Video, Short Form. The music video was awarded two honors at the 1985 MTV Video Music Awards. It collected the awards for Best Group Video and Viewer's Choice. People's Choice Awards recognized "We Are the World" with the Favorite New Song award in 1986. In the same year, the American Music Awards named "We Are the World" "Song of the Year", and honored organizer Harry Belafonte with the Award of Appreciation. Collecting his award, Belafonte thanked Ken Kragen, Quincy Jones, and "the two artists who, without their great gift would not have inspired us in quite the same way as we were inspired, Mr. Lionel Richie and Mr. Michael Jackson". Following the speech, the majority of USA for Africa reunited on stage, closing the ceremony with "We Are the World".

"We Are the World" was inducted into the Grammy Hall of Fame in 2021.

== Track listing ==
=== Vinyl single ===
1. "We Are the World" (USA for Africa) – 7:19
2. "Grace" (Quincy Jones) – 4:30

== Marketing and promotion ==
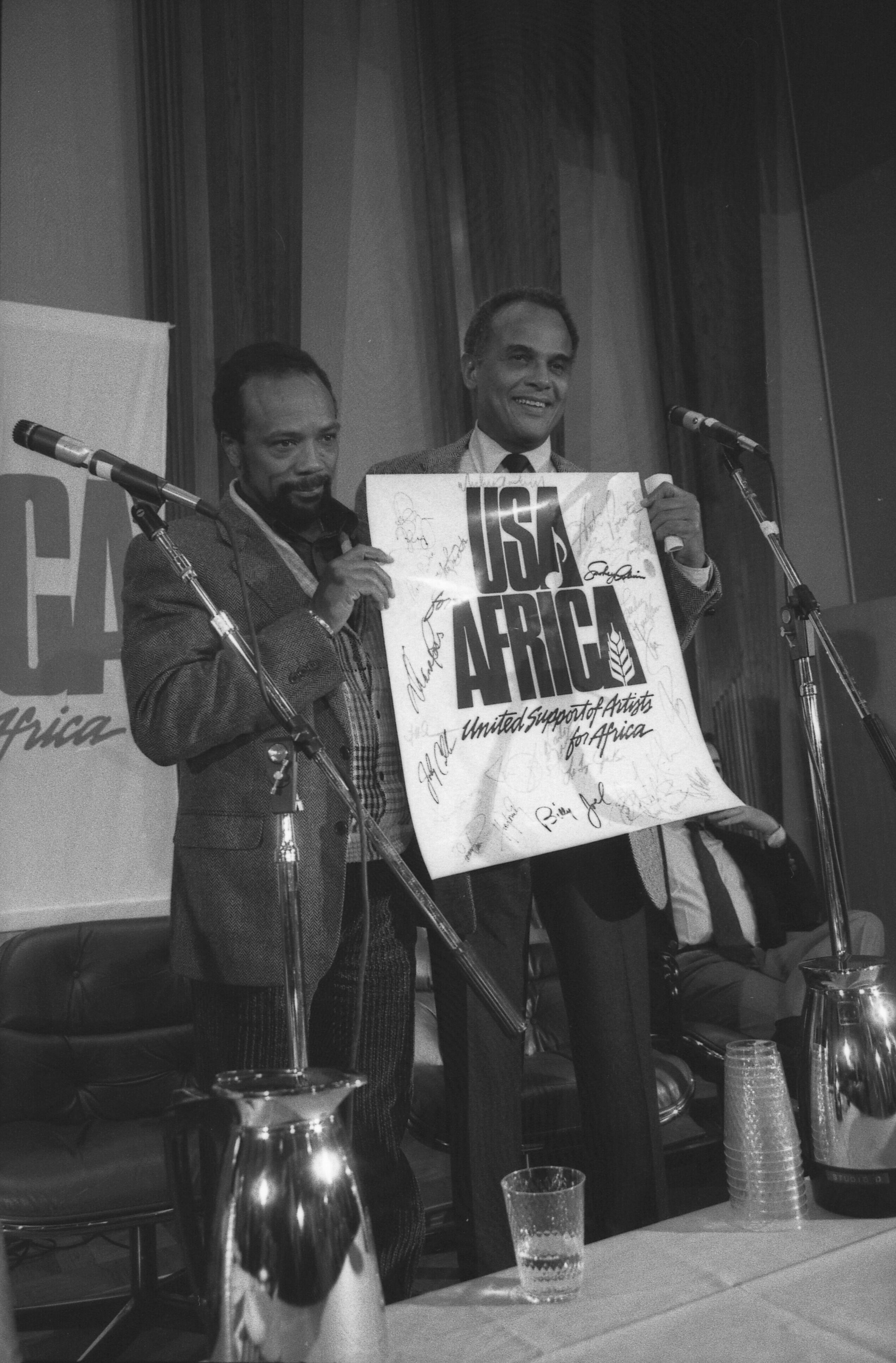
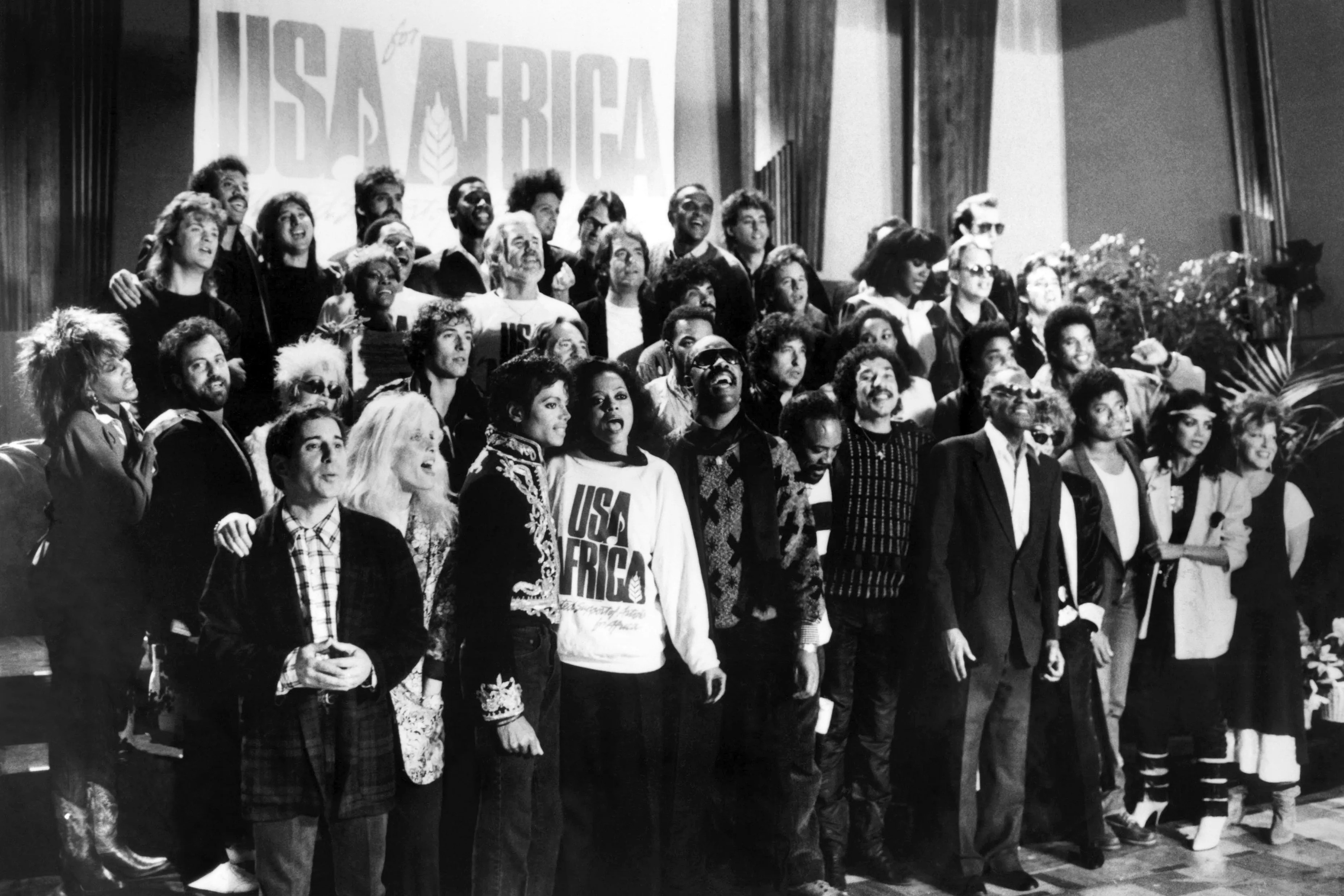
Quincy Jones and Harry Belafonte at a press conference (left); USA For Africa supergroup, featuring all musicians in a promotional photo (right)

"We Are the World" was promoted with a music video, a video cassette, and several other items made available to the public, including books, posters, shirts and buttons. All proceeds from the sale of official USA for Africa merchandise went directly to the famine relief fund. All of the merchandise sold well; the video cassette—titled We Are the World: The Video Event—documented the making of the song, and became the ninth-best-selling video of 1985. All of the video elements were produced by Howard G. Malley and Craig B. Golin along with April Lee Grebb as the production supervisor. The music video showed the recording of "We Are the World", and drew criticism from some. Michael Jackson was reported to have joked before filming, "People will know it's me as soon as they see the socks. Try taking footage of Bruce Springsteen's socks and see if anyone knows who they belong to."

The song was also promoted with a special edition of the American magazine Life. The publication had been the only media outlet permitted inside A&M Recording Studios on the night of January 28, 1985. All other press organizations were barred from reporting the events leading up to and during "We Are the World"'s recording. Life ran a cover story of the recording session in its April 1985 edition of the monthly magazine. Seven members of USA for Africa were pictured on the cover: Bob Dylan, Bruce Springsteen, Cyndi Lauper, Lionel Richie, Michael Jackson, Tina Turner and Willie Nelson. Inside the magazine were photographs of the "We Are the World" participants working and taking breaks.

"We Are the World" received worldwide radio coverage in the form of an international simultaneous broadcast later that year. Upon spinning the song on their local stations, Georgia radio disc jockeys Bob Wolf and Don Briscar came up with the idea for a worldwide simulcast. They called hundreds of radio and satellite stations asking them to participate. On the morning of April 5, 1985 (Good Friday of that year) at 3:50 pm GMT, over 8,000 radio stations simultaneously broadcast the song around the world. As the song was broadcast, hundreds of people sang along on the steps of St. Patrick's Cathedral in New York. A year later, on March 28, 1986 (Good Friday of that year), the simultaneous radio broadcast of "We Are the World" was repeated over 6,000 radio stations worldwide.

"We Are the World" gained further promotion and coverage on May 25, 1986, when it was played during a major benefit event held throughout the US. Hands Across America—USA for Africa's follow-up project—was an event in which millions of people formed a human chain across the US. The event was held to draw attention to hunger and homelessness in the United States. "We Are the World"'s co-writer, Michael Jackson, had wanted his song to be the official theme for the event. The other board members of USA for Africa outvoted him, and it was instead decided that a new song would be created and released for the event, titled "Hands Across America". When released, the new song did not achieve the level of success that "We Are the World" did, and the decision to use it as the official theme for the event led to Jackson—who co-owned the publishing rights to "We Are the World"—resigning from the board of directors of USA for Africa.

== Humanitarian aid ==
Four months after the release of "We Are the World", USA for Africa had taken in almost $10.8 million (equivalent to $32 million today). The majority of the money came from record sales within the US. Members of the public also donated money—almost $1.3 million within the same time period. In May 1985, USA for Africa officials estimated that they had sold between $45 million and $47 million worth of official merchandise around the world. Organizer Ken Kragen announced that they would not be distributing all of the money at once. Instead, he revealed that the foundation would be looking into finding a long-term solution for Africa's problems. "We could go out and spend it all in one shot. Maybe we'd save some lives in the short term but it would be like putting a Band-Aid over a serious wound." Kragen noted that experts had predicted that it would take at least 10 to 20 years to make a slight difference to Africa's long-term problems.

In June 1985, the first USA for Africa cargo jet carrying food, medicine, and clothing departed for Ethiopia and Sudan. It stopped en route in New York, where 15,000 T-shirts were added to the cargo. Included in the supplies were high-protein biscuits, high-protein vitamins, medicine, tents, blankets and refrigeration equipment. Harry Belafonte, representing the USA for Africa musicians, visited Sudan in the same month. The trip was his last stop on a four-nation tour of Africa. Tanzanian Prime Minister Salim Ahmed Salim greeted and praised Belafonte, telling him, "I personally and the people of Tanzania are moved by this tremendous example of human solidarity."

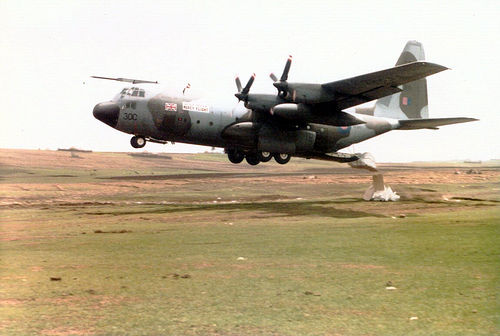
A military aircraft dropping food during the 1984–1985 Ethiopian famine

One year after the release of "We Are the World", organizers noted that $44.5 million had been raised for USA for Africa's humanitarian fund. They stated that they were confident that they would reach an initial set target of $50 million (equivalent to $147 million in 2025). By October 1986, it was revealed that their $50 million target had been met and exceeded; CBS Records gave USA for Africa a check for $2.5 million, drawing the total amount of money to $51.2 million. USA for Africa's Hands Across America event had also raised a significant amount of money—approximately $24.5 million for the hungry in the US.

Since its release, "We Are the World" has raised over $80 million (equivalent to $235 million today) for humanitarian causes. Ninety percent of the money was pledged to African relief, both long and short term. The long-term initiative included efforts in birth control and food production. The remaining 10 percent of funds was earmarked for domestic hunger and homeless programs in the US. From the African fund, over 70 recovery and development projects were launched in seven African nations. Such projects included aid in agriculture, fishing, water management, manufacturing and reforestation. Training programs were also developed in the African countries of Mozambique, Senegal, Chad, Mauritania, Burkina Faso, and Mali.

Following Jackson's death in 2009, Elias Kifle Maraim Beyene, who grew up in Ethiopia and was a beneficiary of the aid provided by the single, related:

I won't ever forget Michael Jackson because his contribution to the song We are the World had a very significant effect on my life. I am 50 now but 25 years ago I was living in Addis Ababa, Ethiopia, which at that time was suffering from a long drought and famine. It was a terrible situation. Lots of people became sick and many more died. Around one million people in all were killed by the famine. In 1984 Michael Jackson, along with a number of other leading musicians, made the song We are the World to raise money for Africa. We received a lot of aid from the world and I was one of those who directly benefitted from it. The wheat flour that was distributed to the famine victims was different to the usual cereal we bought at the market. We baked a special bread from it. The local people named the bread after the great artist and it became known as Michael Bread. It was soft and delicious. When you have been through such hard times you never forget events like this. If you speak to anyone who was in Addis Ababa at that time they will all know what Michael Bread is and I know I will remember it for the rest of my life.

== Notable live performances ==
"We Are the World" has been performed live by members of USA for Africa on several occasions both together and individually. One of the earliest such performances came in 1985, during the rock music concert Live Aid, which ended with more than 100 musicians singing the song on stage. Harry Belafonte and Lionel Richie made surprise appearances for the live rendition of the song. Michael Jackson would have joined the artists, but was "working around the clock in the studio on a project that he's made a major commitment to", according to his press agent, Norman Winter.

An inaugural celebration was held for US President-elect Bill Clinton in January 1993. The event was staged by Clinton's Hollywood friends at the Lincoln Memorial and drew hundreds of thousands of people. Aretha Franklin, LL Cool J, Michael Bolton and Tony Bennett were among some of the musicians in attendance. Said Jones, "I've never seen so many great performers come together with so much love and selflessness." The celebration included a performance of "We Are the World", which involved Clinton, his daughter Chelsea, and his wife Hillary singing the song along with USA for Africa's Kenny Rogers, Diana Ross and Michael Jackson. The New York Times' Edward Rothstein commented on the event, stating, "The most enduring image may be of Mr. Clinton singing along in 'We Are the World', the first President to aspire, however futilely, to hipness."

As a prelude to his song "Heal the World", "We Are the World" was performed as an interlude during two of Michael Jackson's tours, the Dangerous World Tour (1992–1993) and the HIStory World Tour (1996–1997), as well as Jackson's performance at the Super Bowl XXVII halftime show in 1993. Jackson briefly performed the song with a chorus at the 2006 World Music Awards in London, which marked his last live public performance. Jackson planned to use the song for his This Is It comeback concerts at the O2 Arena in London from 2009 to 2010, but the shows were cancelled due to his sudden death.

Michael Jackson died in June 2009, after suffering a cardiac arrest. His memorial service was held several days later on July 7, and was reported to have been viewed by more than one billion people. The finale of the event featured group renditions of the Jackson anthems "We Are the World" and "Heal the World". The singalong of "We Are the World" was led by Darryl Phinnessee, who had worked with Jackson since the late 1980s. It also featured co-writer Lionel Richie and Jackson's family, including his children. Following the performance, "We Are the World" re-entered the US charts for the first time since its 1985 release. The song debuted at number 50 on Billboard's Hot Digital Songs chart.

== 25 for Haiti ==
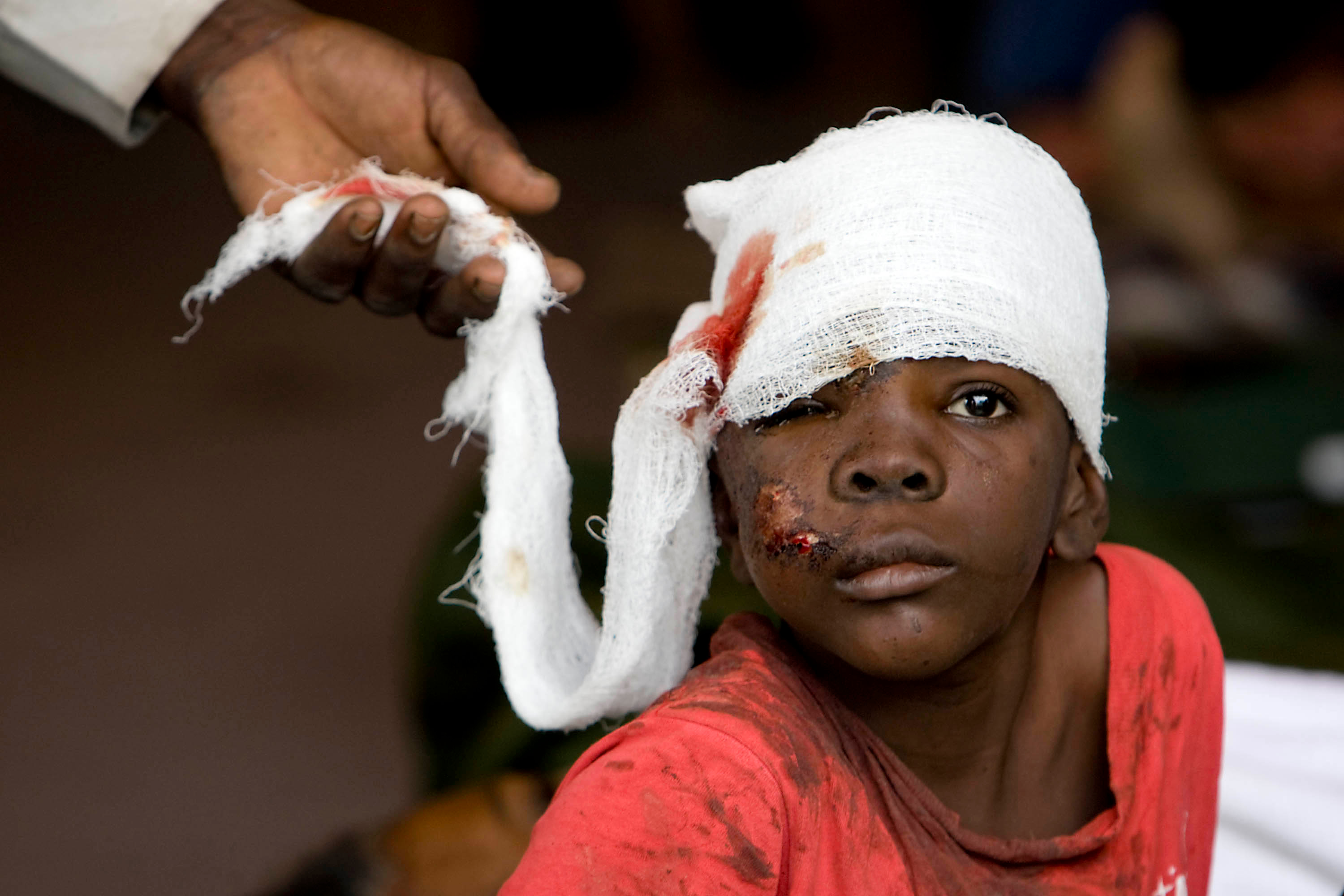
One of the hundreds of thousands of people who were injured by the destructive earthquake in Haiti

On January 12, 2010, a magnitude-7.0 earthquake struck Haiti, the island's most severe earthquake in over 200 years. The epicenter of the quake was just outside the Haitian capital Port-au-Prince. The Haitian government confirmed the deaths of over 230,000 civilians because of the disaster and the injuries of around 300,000. Approximately 1.2 million people were homeless and the lack of temporary shelter may have led to the outbreak of disease.

To raise money for earthquake victims, a new celebrity version of "We Are the World" was recorded on February 1, 2010, and released on February 12, 2010. Over 75 musicians were involved in the remake, which was recorded in the same studio as the 1985 original. The new version features revised lyrics as well as a rap part pertaining to Haiti. Michael Jackson's younger sister Janet duets with her brother on the track, as per a request from their mother Katherine. In the video and on the track, archival material of Michael Jackson is used from the original 1985 recording. This version is also infamous for the way Wyclef sings towards the end of the song, fluctuating his voice in a manner that sounds like, as a music writer for the San Francisco Chronicle called it, "Not unlike a cross between a fire siren and the sound of Wyclef giving himself a hernia."

On February 20, 2010, a non-celebrity remake, "We Are the World 25 for Haiti (YouTube edition)", was posted to the video sharing website YouTube. Internet personality and singer-songwriter Lisa Lavie conceived and organized the Internet collaboration of 57 unsigned or independent YouTube musicians geographically distributed around the world. Lavie's 2010 YouTube version, a cover of the 1985 original, excludes the rap segment and minimizes the Auto-tune that characterizes the 2010 celebrity remake. Another 2010 remake of the original is the Spanish-language "Somos El Mundo". It was written by Emilio Estefan and his wife Gloria Estefan, and produced by Emilio, Quincy Jones and Univision Communications, the company that funded the project.

== Legacy ==
"We Are the World" has been recognized as a politically important song, which "affected an international focus on Africa that was simply unprecedented". It has been credited with creating a climate in which musicians from around the world felt inclined to follow. According to The New York Times' Stephen Holden, since the release of "We Are the World", it has been noted that movement has been made within popular music to create songs that address humanitarian concerns. "We Are the World" was also influential in subverting the way music and meaning were produced, showing that musically and racially diverse musicians could work together both productively and creatively. Ebony described the January 28 recording session, in which Quincy Jones brought together a multi-racial group, as being "a major moment in world music that showed we can change the world". "We Are the World", along with Live Aid and Farm Aid, demonstrated that rock music had become more than entertainment, but a political and social movement. Journalist Robert Palmer noted that such songs and events had the ability to reach people around the world, send them a message, and then get results.

Since the release of "We Are the World", and the Band Aid single that influenced it, numerous songs have been recorded in a similar fashion, with the intent to aid disaster victims throughout the world. One such example involved a supergroup of Latin musicians billed as "Hermanos del Tercer Mundo", or "Brothers of the Third World". Among the supergroup of 62 recording artists were Julio Iglesias, José Feliciano, and Sérgio Mendes. Their famine relief song was recorded in the same studio as "We Are the World". Half of the profits raised from the charity single was pledged to USA for Africa. The rest of the money was to be used for impoverished Latin American countries. Other notable examples include the 1989 cover of the Deep Purple song "Smoke on the Water" by a supergroup of hard rock, prog rock, and heavy metal musicians collaborating as Rock Aid Armenia to raise money for victims of the devastating 1988 Armenian earthquake, the 1986 all-star OPM single "Handog ng Pilipino sa Mundo", which talked about the optimism the Filipinos needed after the People Power Revolution, the 2003 all-star OPM recording "Biyahe Tayo" which promoted Philippine tourism and its subsequent 2011 remake "Pilipinas, Tara Na!" the 2009 all-star OPM recordings "Star ng Pasko" and "Kaya Natin Ito!" as a means to provide hope to the survivors of Typhoon Ketsana (locally known as Ondoy). Several Star Music artists also recorded another inspirational ballad, "Restart Back2Love" in 2017 to provide hope to the survivors of the Siege of Marawi (locally known as Yolanda).

The 20th anniversary of "We Are the World" was celebrated in 2005. Radio stations around the world paid homage to USA for Africa's creation by simultaneously broadcasting the charity song. In addition to the simulcast, the milestone was marked by the release of a two-disc DVD called We Are the World: The Story Behind the Song. Ken Kragen asserted that the reason behind the simulcast and DVD release was not for USA for Africa to praise themselves for doing a good job, but to "use it to do some more good [for the original charity]. That's all we care about accomplishing." Harry Belafonte also commented on the 20th anniversary of the song. He acknowledged that "We Are the World" had "stood the test of time"; anyone old enough to remember it can still at least hum along.

On January 29, 2024, a documentary about the recording of the song, The Greatest Night in Pop, was released on Netflix, featuring interviews with Richie, Springsteen, Lewis, Warwick, Lauper and others.

== Other versions and parodies ==
In 2026, Spike and the Gimme Gimmes assembled an all-star Punk rock lineup cover of the song to benefit Sweet Relief. The single and music video was released on Fat Wreck Chords. Performers on the song include Milo Aukerman, Nikki Corvette, Dani Miller, Jim Lindberg, Tony Reflex, Blag Dahlia, Dickey Barrett, Stacey Dee, and more. Included in the music video are cameos by Marc Orrell, Tokyo Hiro, Channel 3, director Josh Roush, and more.

== Charts ==
=== Weekly charts ===
| Chart (1985–1986) | Peak position |
|---|---|
| Australia (Kent Music Report) | 1 |
| Austria (Ö3 Austria Top 40) | 2 |
| Belgium (Ultratop 50 Flanders) | 1 |
| Brazil (ABPD) | 6 |
| Canada Retail Singles (The Record) | 3 |
| Canada Top Singles (RPM) | 1 |
| Canada Adult Contemporary (RPM) | 1 |
| Chile (UPI) | 1 |
| Denmark (Hitlisten) | 3 |
| Finland (Suomen virallinen lista) | 1 |
| France (SNEP) | 1 |
| Ireland (IRMA) | 1 |
| Italy (Musica e dischi) | 1 |
| Netherlands (Dutch Top 40) | 1 |
| Netherlands (Single Top 100) | 1 |
| New Zealand (Recorded Music NZ) | 1 |
| Norway (VG-lista) | 1 |
| Panama (UPI) | 1 |
| Paraguay (UPI) | 1 |
| Portugal (AFP) | 1 |
| South Africa (Springbok Radio) | 1 |
| Spain (AFYVE) | 1 |
| Sweden (Sverigetopplistan) | 1 |
| Switzerland (Schweizer Hitparade) | 1 |
| UK Singles (Official Charts) | 1 |
| US Billboard Hot 100 | 1 |
| US Adult Contemporary (Billboard) | 1 |
| US Hot Black Singles (Billboard) | 1 |
| US Hot Country Songs (Billboard) | 76 |
| US Hot Dance/Disco 12 Inch Singles Sales (Billboard) | 1 |
| US Mainstream Rock Airplay (Billboard) | 27 |
| US Cash Box Top Singles | 1 |
| Venezuela (UPI) | 1 |
| West Germany (GfK) | 2 |

=== Year-end charts ===
| Chart (1985) | Position |
|---|---|
| Australia (Kent Music Report) | 1 |
| Canada Top Singles (RPM) | 23 |
| New Zealand (Recorded Music NZ) | 1 |
| South Africa (Springbok Radio) | 8 |
| UK Singles (OCC) | 35 |
| US Billboard Hot 100 | 20 |
| US Black Singles Chart (Billboard) | 37 |
| US Cash Box Top Singles | 1 |

== Certifications and sales ==
| Region | Certification | Certified units/sales |
|---|---|---|
| Canada (Music Canada) | 3× Platinum | 300,000^{^} |
| Denmark (IFPI Danmark) | Gold | 45,000^{‡} |
| Finland | — | 7,750 |
| France (SNEP) | Platinum | 1,000,000^{*} |
| Italy (FIMI) Sales since 2009 | Gold | 15,000^{‡} |
| New Zealand (RMNZ) | Platinum | 20,000^{*} |
| Portugal | — | 200,000 |
| United Kingdom (BPI) | Silver | 250,000^{^} |
| United States (RIAA) | 4× Platinum | 8,000,000^{^} |
Summaries
| Worldwide Global sales (as of 1995) | — | 14,000,000 |
^{*} Sales figures based on certification alone.^{^} Shipments figures based on certification alone.^{‡} Sales+streaming figures based on certification alone.

== See also ==
- Band Aid (band)
- "Cantaré, cantarás"
- "Chiquitita", an ABBA song, sales of which benefit humanitarian relief for children
- Hear 'n Aid
- Music for UNICEF Concert
- "Tears Are Not Enough", a 1985 charity single recorded by a supergroup of Canadian artists, under the name Northern Lights, to raise funds for relief of the 1983–85 famine in Ethiopia
- The Greatest Night in Pop, documentary about the making of "We Are the World"
- "Tomorrow Will Be Better"
- "We Are One" (global collaboration song)
- We Con the World

== Bibliography ==
- Braheny, John (2006). The Craft and Business of Songwriting. Writer's Digest Books. ISBN 1-58297-466-7.
- Breskin, David (2004). We Are the World: The Story Behind the Song booklet. Image Entertainment, Inc.
- Campbell, Lisa (1993). Michael Jackson: The King of Pop. Branden. ISBN 0-8283-1957-X.
- Davis, Sharon (2006). Stevie Wonder: Rhythms of Wonder. Robson. ISBN 1-86105-965-5.
- Garofalo, Reebee (1992). Rockin' the Boat. South End Press. ISBN 0-89608-427-2.
- George, Nelson (2004). Michael Jackson: The Ultimate Collection booklet. Sony BMG.
- Marsh, Dave (2004). Bruce Springsteen: Two Hearts. Routledge. ISBN 0-415-96928-X.
- Taraborrelli, J. Randy (2004). The Magic and the Madness. Terra Alta, WV: Headline. ISBN 0-330-42005-4.
