= También romantica =

Tambien Romantica

Studio album by Verónica Castro
- Released: 1983
- Recorded: 1983
- Genre: Ranchera
- Label: Peerless Records

Verónica Castro chronology
Sábado en la Noche Tiki-Tiki (1982)	Tambien Romantica (1983)	Esa Mujer (1986)

Tambien Romantica (Also Romantic) is the seventh album by Mexican singer Verónica Castro. It was released in 1983. The song "Juntos" is from "Verónica: El rostro del amor" a telenovela starring Castro and made in Argentina.

== Track listing ==
1. "Hasta Que Te Perdí" (Roberto Belester)
2. "Juntos" (Tema de la Telenovela Verónica: El rostro del amor) (Sergio Esquivel)
3. "Ahora Que Estoy Sola" (Manolo Marroqui)
4. "Mi Guardián, Mi Carcelero" (Tema de la Telenovela "Cara a Cara") (Miguel Valenzuela)
5. "Si Regresas" (Sergio Esquivel)
6. "Porque Tú Ya Eras Mío" (Roberto Balester)
7. "Estoy De Sobra" (Candelaria Esquivel)
8. "El Amor Es Así" (Sergio Esquivel)
9. "Tú Me Prometiste Volver" (Joaquín Galán)
10. "Punto Y Se Acabó" (Manolo Marroqui)

== Singles ==
#	Title	Date
1.	"Hasta Que Te Perdi"	
2.	"Juntos"	
3.	"Mi Guardian, Mi Carcelero"	
4.	"Tu Me Prometiste Volver"	
