= Reina de la Noche =

Studio album by Verónica Castro
- Released: 1987
- Recorded: 1987
- Genre: Pop
- Label: ImDiscos

Verónica Castro chronology
Simplemente Todo (1986)	Reina de la Noche (1987)	Maxi Disco Rosa Salvaje (1988)

Reina de la Noche (Queen of the Night) is the ninth album by Mexican iconic pop singer Verónica Castro. It was released in 1987. "Mala Noche... ¡No!" is the theme song to Verónica Castro's Hit show of the same name. Verónica Castro was filming the telenovela Rosa salvaje at the time. Due to the success of her album, "Reina de la Noche," she was invited to perform in the 30th anniversary celebration of Viña Del Mar.

== Track listing ==
1. "Reina de la noche" (Rudy Pérez-Manny Benito)
2. "Brujo" (Sergio Mendez)
3. "Mala Noche... ¡No!" ("Ma la Notte No") (Verónica Castro-Toto Otuño)
4. "Ni amigos, ni amantes" (Rudy Pérez-Manny Benito)
5. "Espinita" (Nico Jiménez)
6. "Semaforo" (Mario Patiño)
7. "Loca" (José Luis Piloto)
8. "Rosa salvaje" (José Antonio 'Potro' Farías)
9. "Me Vale" (Maria Esther Aguirre de Rodriguez)
10. "Un poco de mi" ("Willy Chirino")

== Charts ==
#	Title
1.	"Mala Noche... ¡No!" Lanzado: Septiembre 3, 1988 Billboard Hot Latin 50 USA: #6
