= Norteño (album) =

Studio album by Verónica Castro
- Released: 1980
- Recorded: 1980
- Genre: Ranchera
- Label: Peerless Records

Verónica Castro chronology
Aprendí a Llorar (1979)	Norteño (1980)	Cosas de Amigos (1981)

Norteño is the third album by Mexican singer Verónica Castro. It was released in 1980.

== Track listing ==
1. "El Descolon" (Manolo Marroquí)
2. "Por Eso" (Manolo Marroquí)
3. "Andale Compadre" (Lalo Rodríguez)
4. "No Te Confundas" (Fabiola Del Carmen)
5. "El Día Del Amor" (Paulino Vargas)
6. "Cantando Por Telefono" (Lalo Rodríguez)
7. "Muchacho Terremoto" (Fabiola Del Carmen)
8. "Fantasmas" (Luigi Lazareno)
9. "Te Has Marchado" (Lalo Rodríguez)
10. "Cerezo Blanco" (Paulino Vargas)

== Album ==
#	Title
1.	"Norteño" Lanzado: Septiembre 13, 1980 Billboard Top Latin Albums: Los Angeles Pop #4, Texas #4, Chicago #10

== Singles ==
#	Title	Date
1.	"CEREZO BLANCO"	
2.	"EL DESCOLON"	
