= Verónica Castro =

Mexican actress and singer (born 1952)

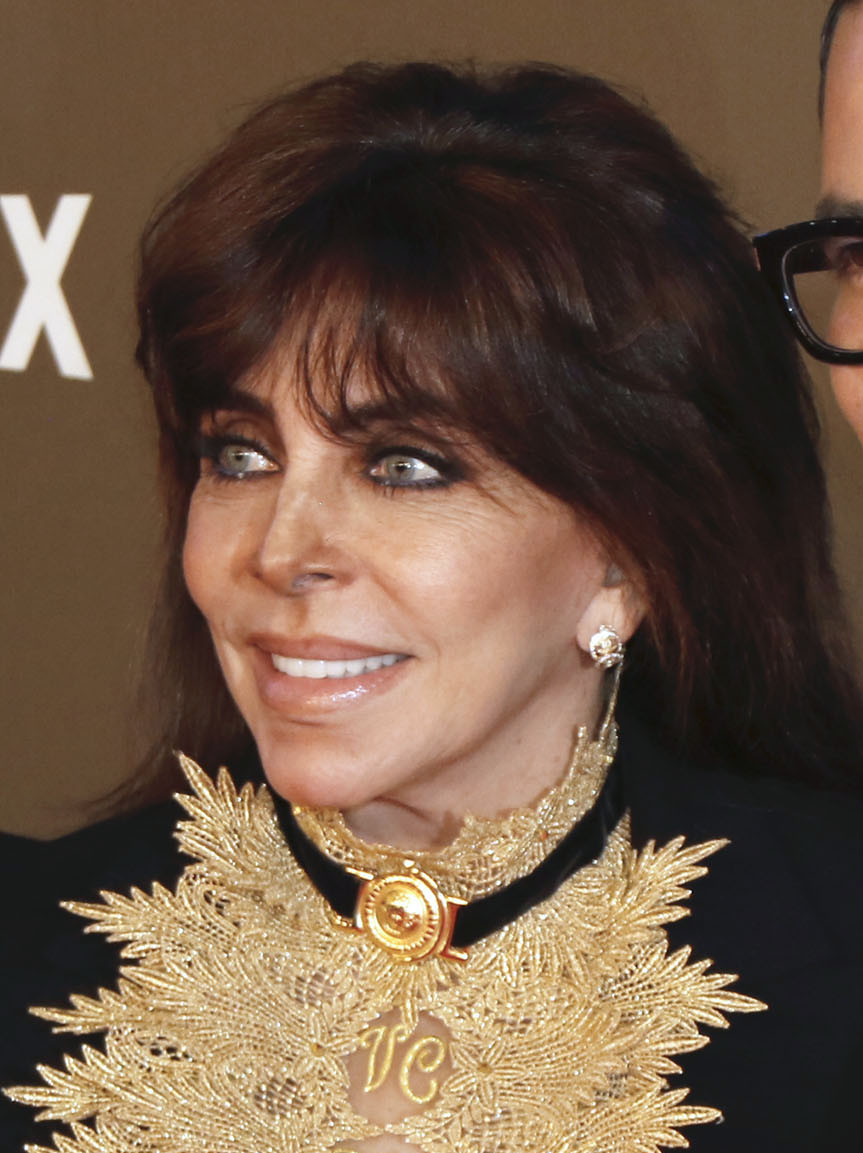
- Castro in December 2017
- Born: Verónica Judith Sáinz Castro; 19 October 1952 (age 74); Mexico City, Mexico
- Other names: Vero, La Chaparrita de Oro, La Chaparrita consentida
- Occupations: Actress, singer, producer, former model, host
- Years active: 1971–present
- Notable work: Los Ricos También Lloran; Rosa Salvaje; La Movida; La Casa de las Flores

Verónica Judith Sáinz Castro (Latin American Spanish pronunciation: [beˈɾonika ˈkastɾo]; born 19 October 1952) is a Mexican actress and television personality. She began her career in the late 1960s with minor film and television roles before rising to prominence as the star of the telenovela Los ricos también lloran (1979), a success that established her as one of the genre's leading figures. She later followed with El derecho de nacer (1981), Rosa salvaje (1987), and Mi pequeña Soledad (1990).

Castro also gained attention as a talk show host, presenting late-night programs such as Mala noche… ¡no! (1988) and La movida (1991), among others, which achieved strong ratings. In the early 2000s, she later worked as a reality television host on Big Brother VIP, another major audience success. After a period of reduced screen activity, she enjoyed a brief resurgence in popularity with the Netflix series The House of Flowers (2018). Her honours include eight TVyNovelas Awards, including two lifetime achievement awards, and the 2005 Spanish Emmy Award for her influence on television. She is the mother of singer Cristian Castro.

== Acting and music career ==
In 1986, she performed in the Latin version of "We Are The World", Cantare, cantaras. She also released one of her most ambitious albums to date, Simplemente Todo. The top-selling singles from Simplemente Todo were "Oye Tu," the title selection, "Nunca Lo Sabra," and "Macumba." Unlike other artists of the time, however, Castro accompanied her singles with videos, becoming one of the pioneers of the MTV age in Latin America. Even as she recorded the music video "Macumba," she worked in telenovelas in Argentina and Italy.

During the 1990s, she began hosting variety shows, and has continued to do so since.

In 2009 Verónica Castro went back to telenovelas, and left Mexico for Argentina to film the telenovela Los Exitosos Pérez. It premiered in Mexico on August 30, 2009.

In 2017, she was cast as the matronly Virginia de la Mora in Netflix's The House of Flowers, a Mexican comedy-drama series. It premiered on Netflix in August 2018.

== Stage credits ==
Year	Title	Notes
2016	Aplauso	
2008	Chiquita Pero Picosa	
1995	La Mujer del Año	
1983	Los Amores De Verónica	
1982	Un día con Charlie	
1980	Chiquita Pero Picosa	
1979	Trú Trú entre Tres	
1978	24 Horas Charlie	
1978	La Luna Azul	
1977	La Idiota	
1976	Coqueluche	
1976	Travesuras De Media Noche	
1975	Don Juan Tenorio	
1971	El Juego de Jugamos	
1970	Por eso Estamos Como Estamos	
1970	Romeo Y Julieta	

== Albums ==
Year	Title	Notes
2013	80 Años Peerless Una Historia Musical	
2009	Resurrección	
2008	Serie Diamante	
2005	Por esa Puerta	
2003	70 Años Peerless Una Historia Musical	
2002	Imágenes	
1999	Ave Vagabundo	
1997	La Tocada	
1996	De Colección	
1995	La Mujer del Año (Theater)	
1993	Vamonos al Dancing	
1992	Romantica Y Calculadora	
1992	Rap de La Movida	
1991	Tudo É Bom Pra Se Dançar	
1990	Solidaridad (duets duets, charity recording)	
1990	Mi Pequeña Soledad	
1990	Viva La Banda	
1988	¡Mamma Mia!	
1988	Maxi Disco Rosa Salvaje	
1987	Reina de la Noche	
1986	Maxi Disco Macumba	
1986	Simplemente Todo	
1986	Esa Mujer	
1985	Cantaré, cantarás (I Will Sing, You Will Sing)	
1983	Tambien Romantica	
1982	Sábado en la Noche Tiki-Tiki	
1982	El Malas Mañas	
1981	Cosas de Amigos (Duet with son Cristian Castro)	
1980	Norteño	
1979	Aprendí a Llorar	
1978	Sensaciones	
1973	Verónica Castro	

== Films ==
Year	Title	Character	Note
2022	Cuando Sea Joven	Malena	
2020	Dime Cuándo Tú		
2008	En la oscuridad		
1990	Dios se lo pague	Main protagonist	
1986	Chiquita pero picosa	Florinda Benitez/Flor	
1986	El niño y el papá	Alicia/Guadalupe	
1984	Nana	Satin	
1981	Johnny Chicano		
1980	Navajeros	Toñi	
1975	Nobleza ranchera		
1975	Guadalajara es México		
1974	El primer paso... de la mujer		
1974	La recogida		
1973	Novios y amantes		
1973	Volveré a nacer	María	
1972	Cuando quiero llorar no lloro		
1972	El arte de engañar	Rebeca Madiaraga	
1972	Un sueño de amor		
1972	El Ausente		
1971	Bikinis y rock	Verónica Ordoñes	
1970	Mi mesera de Zecena Dieguez	La Chata	
1970	La fuerza inútil de Taboada		
1968	Acapulco 12-22		

=== Telenovelas ===
Year	Title	Character	Note
2009	Los Exitosos Perez	Roberta Santos	
2006	Código Postal	Beatriz Corona	
1997	Pueblo chico, infierno grande	Leonarda Ruan	
1993	Valentina		
1990	Mi pequeña Soledad	Isadora Villasenor /Soledad	Protagonist
1987	Rosa salvaje	Rosa García	Protagonist
1986	Amor prohibido	Nora	
1985	Felicidad, ¿Dónde estás?	Karina	Protagonist
1984	Yolanda Luján	Yolanda Luján	Protagonist
1983	Cara a cara	Laura	Protagonist
1982	Verónica: El rostro del amor	Verónica	Protagonist
1981	El derecho de nacer	María Elena del Junco	
1979	Los ricos también lloran	Mariana Villareal	Protagonist
1978	Pasiones encendidas	Martha	Co-Protagonist
1976	Mañana será otro día		
1975	Barata de primavera		
1972	El edificio de enfrente		
1971	El amor tiene cara de mujer		
1969	No creo en los hombres		

== TV shows ==
Year	Title	Role	Notes
2019	Pequeños Gigantes	Judge	
2018	La casa de las flores		
2008	Mujeres Asesinas		
2007	Mentiras y Verdades		
2005	Big Brother VIP 4		
2005	Big brother 3R		
2004	Big Brother VIP 3		
2003	Big Brother VIP 2	Self	
2002	Big Brother VIP		
1996	La tocada		
1995	En la Noche		
1992	¡Y Vero América va!		
1991	La movida		
1989	Bienvenidos Aquí está		
1988	Mala Noche... ¡No!		
1986	Algo muy especial de Verónica Castro		
1984	Esta noche se improvisa		
1980	Noche a noche		
1975	Muy agradecido		
1972	Sábado '72		
1972	Revista musical Nescafe		
1971	Revista musical		
1966	Operación Ja Ja		

== Sources ==
- Official Website of Veronica Castro
- Official Fan Mail: Correo de Fans Verónica Castro 1707 Post Oak Blvd. #261, Houston, TX USA 77056
