= 70 Años Peerless Una Historia Musical =

Compilation album by Verónica Castro
- Released: 2003
- Recorded: 1970s
- Genre: Pop
- Label: Peerless

Verónica Castro chronology
Imágenes (2002)	70 Años Peerless Una Historia Musical (2003)	Por esa Puerta (2005)

70 Años Peerless Una Historia Musical is the fourth hits album by Mexican iconic pop singer Verónica Castro. It was released in 2003 By Peerless Records, celebrating the label's 70th anniversary.

== Track listing ==
1. "Yo Quisiera Señor Locutor" (Fabiola Del Carmen)
2. "Aprendí a Llorar" (Lolita de la Colina)
3. "El Deslocón" (Manolo Marroqui)
4. "Soy Celosa" (Fabiola Del Carmen)
5. "No Soy Monedita de Oro"
6. "Yofo Tefe"
7. "El Malas Mañas"
8. "Una Aventura" (Juan Gabriel)
9. "Muchacho Terremoto"
10. "Hasta Que Te Perdí" (Roberto Belester)
11. "Sábado en la Noche -Tiki Tiki-"
12. "Por Eso"
13. "Mi Guardian, Mi Carcelero"
14. "Pobre Gorrión" (Esperanza Acevedo)
15. "Mi Pequeño Ciclon" (Manolo Marroqui)
16. "Adios" (Juan Gabriel)
17. "Si los Niños Gobernáran Al Mundo"
18. "Cerezo Blanco"
19. "Vida Mía"
20. "Siempre Tú"
