= Simplemente Todo =

Studio album by Verónica Castro
- Released: 1986
- Recorded: 1986
- Genre: Pop
- Label: ImDiscos

Verónica Castro chronology
Esa Mujer (1986)	Simplemente Todo (1986)	Reina de la Noche (1987)

Simplemente Todo is the eighth album by Mexican iconic pop singer Verónica Castro, released in 1986. The single "Macumba" has been a success in many countries. The song "Nunca Lo Sabra" is from "Amor Prohibido", a telenovela Castro starred in and made in Argentina. On Billboard's La Radio Latina by Carlos Agudelo, reported that Castro was chosen as best female singer of the year and received her award by Aplauso '92 in 1987. Raul Velasco also honored Castro this same year in "Los 12 Grandes de Siempre en Domingo."

== Track listing ==
1. "Macumba" (G. Dann-E. Garcia-Seff-Mader)
2. "Sinceridad" (Anibal Pastor)
3. "Oye, Tú" (Anibal Pastor)
4. "Acuerdo Mutuo" (Anibal Pastor)
5. "Amame Para Mañana" (Anibal Pastor)
6. "Simplemente Todo" (H. Meneses; Nora Morales)
7. "Nunca Lo Sabra" (Gracia; Arango)
8. "Estas Matando Mi Amor" (Alvaro Torres)
9. "Por Eso, Vuelve" (Anibal Pastor)
10. "Nadie Como Tú" (Anibal Pastor)

== Album ==
#	Title
1.	"Simplemente Todo" Lanzado: Abril 4, 1987 Billboard Top Latin Albums: USA #20

== Singles ==
Macumba was originally released in July 1986 in Mexico and climbed to number one on The Hit Parade. The single entered Billboard Hot Latin 50 on December 27, 1986 and soared to the top, it was number two for four weeks in 1987.

#	Title
1.	"Macumba" Billboard Exitos de México: #1 Lanzado: July 1, 1986 Billboard Hot Latin 50: #2 (por cuatro semanas) Lanzado: Diciembre 27, 1986
2.	"Simplemente Todo"
3.	"Oye Tu" Billboard Exitos de México: #34 Lanzado: Septiembre 1, 1987
