= Sábado en la Noche Tiki-Tiki =

Studio album by Verónica Castro
- Released: 1982
- Recorded: 1982
- Genre: Pop / Ranchera
- Label: Peerless Records

Verónica Castro chronology
El Malas Mañas. (1982)	Sábado en la Noche Tiki-Tiki (1982)	Tambien Romantica (1983)

Sábado en la Noche Tiki-Tiki is the sixth album by Mexican singer Verónica Castro. It was released in 1982 "Ven" is theme song to El derecho de nacer (1981). Also in the telenovela Verónica Castro's son Cristian Castro plays her lost son.

== Track listing ==
1. Sábado en la Noche Tiki-Tiki The Woodpecker Song (H. Adamson, Eldo Di Lazzaro, L.V. Alberti)
2. Vida Mía (Alejandro Jáen)
3. Se Me Va (Victor Arcos)
4. Yo Te Besaré (Questo AMore) (G.C.B. Gazzi, Lalo)
5. El Tren (E. Rodrigo)
6. Ven Tema de El derecho de nacer (Sergio Esquivel)
7. Atrévete A Decir (E. Rodríguez, Asdraja)
8. Piensa En Mí (E. Rodríguez, Asdraja)
9. Si Los Niños Gobernaran El Mundo (New version) (H. Antón Kirbo B.)
10. Siempre Tú (Ancor Di Piu') (M. Balducci, V. Alberti)

== Singles ==
#	Title	Date
1.	"Vida Mia"	
2.	"Ven"	
3.	"Sábado En La Noche Tiki-Tiki"	
4.	"Siempre Tu"	
