= Slope Records =

American independent record label

- Founded: 2015
- Founder: Thomas Lopez
- Genre: Punk
- Country of origin: U.S.
- Location: Sunnyslope, Arizona
- Official website: sloperecords.com

Slope Records is an independent record label based in Phoenix, Arizona, founded in 2015 by Thomas Lopez. The label specializes in releasing punk rock, garage rock, and underground music on vinyl formats, alongside a catalog of reissues and archival releases. In 2026, the company expanded its operations into literary publishing with the launch of its book imprint, Slope Press.

== History ==
Founded in Phoenix in 2015 by Thomas Lopez, Slope Records was established to document and reissue foundational Arizona punk music while developing a recording roster of contemporary regional and national underground artists.

Feederz - WWHD

“Slope” refers to Sunnyslope, Arizona where the label's home offices are located. Sunnyslope is now part of central Phoenix, but was once the north edge of town. Part of the mission of Slope Records was to bring attention to the burgeoning Phoenix music scene through the re-release of classic Arizona punk rock bands as well as new releases by both Arizona and national acts.

Cover art for Surfbort's debut 7-inch EP (SLOPE04), released by Slope Records.

In 2016, Slope Records funded and released the debut self-titled four-track seven-inch vinyl EP by Brooklyn punk band Surfbort (catalog number SLOPE04). The release marked a key tastemaker milestone for the label, capturing the group's early raw sound prior to their wider national and international recognition, including subsequent signings with Julian Casablancas' Cult Records and Fat Possum Records, collaborations with designer labels such as Gucci, and tours alongside major acts like The Chats, Amyl and the Sniffers, and Bikini Kill.

Slope Records released Product of America by Exterminators on Election Day 2016, which was, at the time, the biggest release on the label. Exterminators are a Phoenix punk rock super group featuring Dan “Johnny Macho” Clark on vocals (Victory Acres, Feederz), Doug “Buzzy Murder” Clark on guitar (Mighty Sphincter), Don Bolles on drums (Germs, 45 Grave), and Cris Kirkwood (Meat Puppets) on bass. Other releases include work by Fuckemos, Nip Drivers, Mighty Sphincter, Surfbort, and Red Squares among others.

First wave Phoenix punk rock band Feederz signed with Slope Records in early February 2017. Frank Discussion, Clear Bob (Dan Clark/Johnny Macho from Exterminators), and DH Peligro (Dead Kennedys) reunited to create their socially and politically charged brand of Dadaist punk. Their initial Slope Records’ release was scheduled to come out in April 2017 featuring controversial cover art by Mike Fisher depicting United States President Donald Trump dressed as Adolf Hitler.

In September 2016, Slope Records began a relationship with skateboard legend and punk rock singer, Duane Peters. Since then, Peter's signed on with Slope and the label has released three 7” EPs by Peters. The first release from March 2017 featured Peters’ early 80s band, Political Crap, and contains three songs originally recorded for the 1981 compilation record, Who Cares (American Standard).

In March 2017, Slope Records began recording a full-length record with Moonlight Magic, a Phoenix-based exotica ensemble led by musician, archivist, and Masonic author Jaime Paul Lamb. The project featured percussion and collaborative contributions from longtime Phoenix underground figure and percussionist Eddy Detroit, marking one of his final recorded studio collaborations prior to his death in June 2021. The album, titled Phoenixotica, was released on vinyl by Slope Records in 2018.

Also released in April 2017, Phoenix, Arizona's The Father Figures who features a former member of Jody Foster's Army (JFA) as well as a member of North Side Kings and The Freeze joined Slope Records and the label released Heavy Lifting, which is the Post-skate punk bands’ fourth full-length record. “Like Fragile Porcelain Mice or Season to Risk, The Father Figures create music at once dissonant and melodically catchy. “USS Destroyer” is especially ear-wormy thanks to a shouted chorus. “Nigerian Prince Charming” is a modern update and mash-up between the Minutemen's “Take 5, D” and Nada Surf's “Popular,” melding a scam e-mail with political rhetoric and stop-and-go structure.”

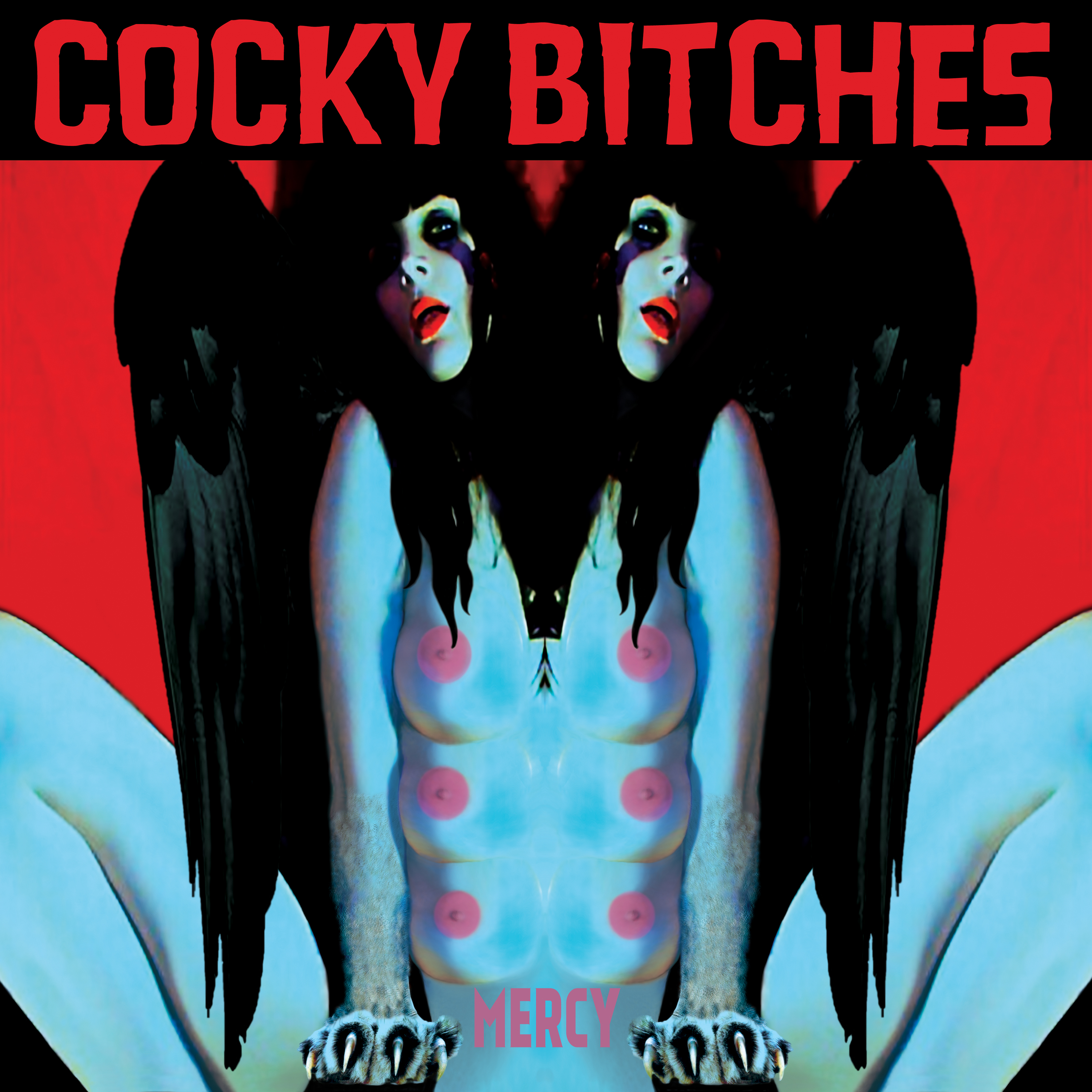
The Cocky Bitches

During the summer of 2017, Slope Records released the TV’s OK EP by Austin, Texas band, The Cocky Bitches. The trio features Paul Leary of the Butthole Surfers as well as Sam McCandless of Cold and singer The Baroness.

In December 2017, Slope Records released two new 7” EPs from the US Bombs. The first of which is a tribute to The Clash with Peters and company providing their rendition of Clash favorites, “Death Or Glory” and “Straight To Hell.” The second EP features two brand new US Bombs songs, “Hollywood Gong Show” and “Midnight Run.” The US Bombs plan to tour extensively in 2018.

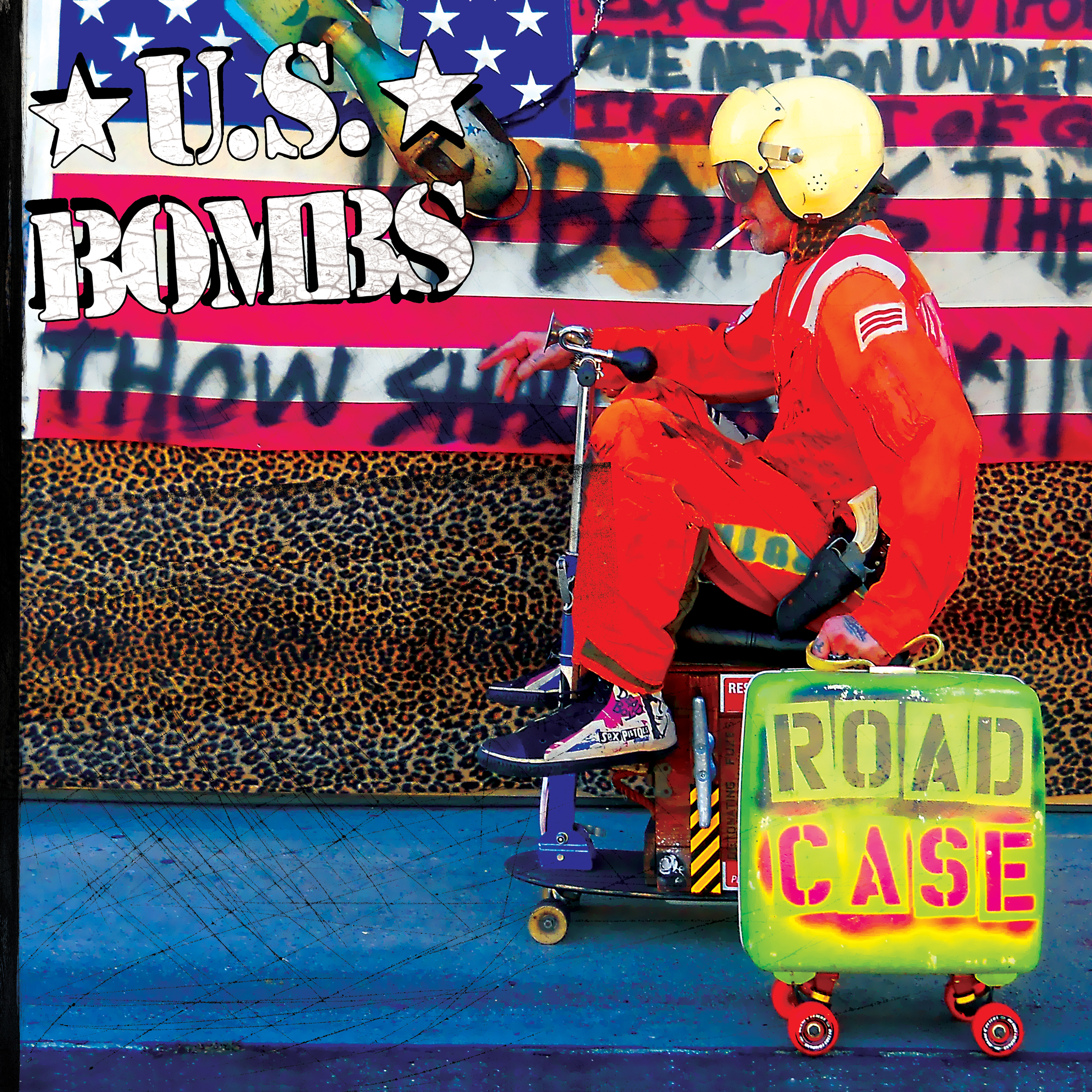
US Bombs - Road Case

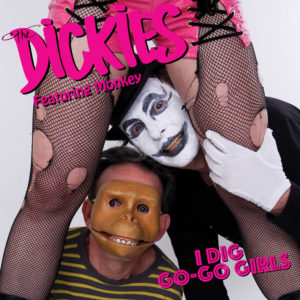
The Dickies ft monkey - "I dig Go-Go Girls"

Phoenix, Arizona via Cape Cod, Massachusetts punks The Freeze signed to Slope Records in 2018 as well with a brand-new record planned for early 2019. Along with The Father Figures, The Freeze represented Slope Records at the 2018 Punk Rock Bowling Festival as well.

In July 2018, the U.S. Bombs put the finishing touches on Road Case, which was their first full-length album in well over a decade. This was also the first LP for the Bombs on Slope Records and was released on November 23, 2018. The band will begin touring to support the record in December 2018 and continue on the road with the first leg of touring featuring Total Chaos as the support act.

The Cocky Bitches also released a full-length LP on Slope Records in November 2018, as well. Mercy is the first LP by the band and was well received. “This is some high grade, weirdo, psych punk with some touches of lysergic blues of the highest order. In a way, it harkens back to Leary’s former band, but in a good way. It’s not a mere copy. He’s just taken the music that’s in his blood and, along with his collaborators, has created some inspired, twisted shit which is likely to put a smile on the face of anybody who likes their rock music way outside the box”.

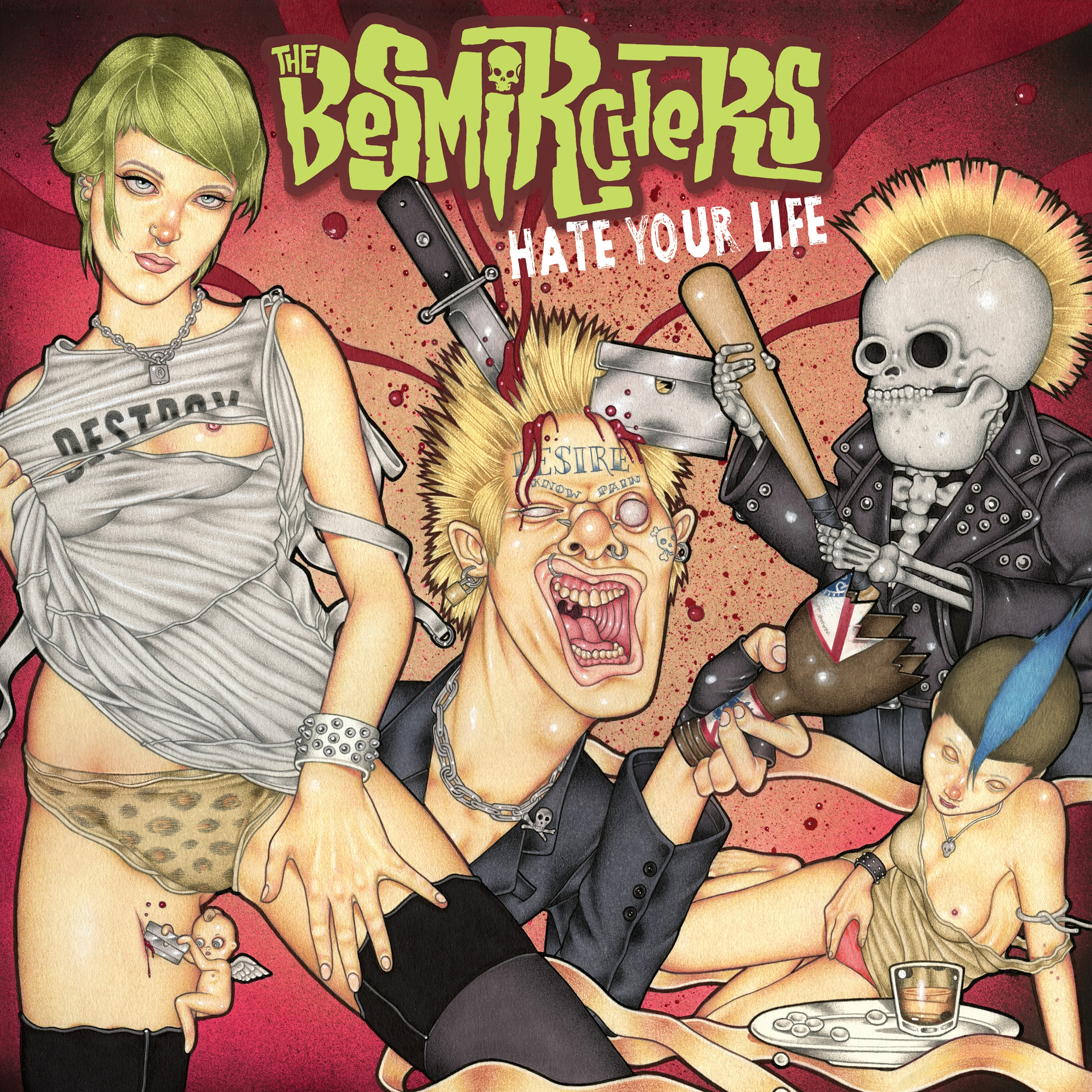
Besmirchers HYL

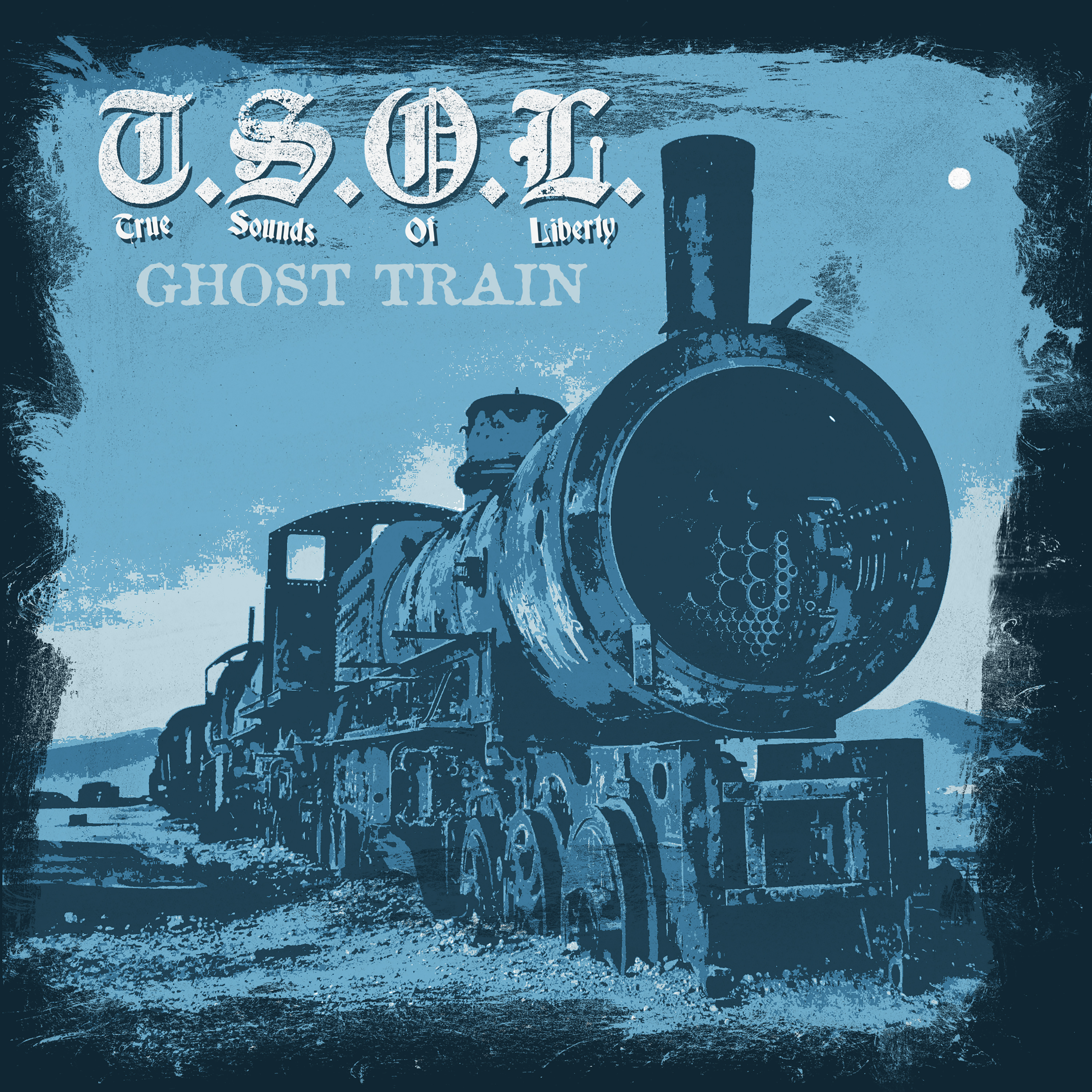
TSOL GhostTrain

During the late spring of 2019, Slope Records launched a new facet to their services by providing tour buses for bands, Anti-Nowhere League, The Dickies, Conflict, and The Exploited have all toured on the buses during 2019. The Linecutters supported Conflict on their brief US tour that culminated with a show at Punk Rock Bowling in Las Vegas.

Slope Records provided The Dickies with a tour bus for the first leg of their 2019 tour with The Queers, as well, celebrating the release of their first Slope Records 7” which featured a cover of the Cheap Trick song, “I Dig Go-Go Girls” featuring Monkey from The Adicts on side A and The Dickies own “The Dreaded Pigasaurus” as the B side. The release was joined in Slope Records summer release slate by Los Angeles, California's Dead77 with their Slope debut, Astray, and The Linecutters’ Knuckledragger EP.

Following the release of their full-length LP, ‘Hate Your Life,’ The Besmirchers set out for a two-show leg of the Anti Nowhere League's three US shows in 2019, which culminated in an arena performance at the Banc Stadium in Los Angeles. The Banc Stadium lineup consisted of Cro-Mags, ANWL, The Distillers, Rise Against, and the original lineup of The Misfits. The Besmirchers and ANWL had organized a longer 2020 tour, which was derailed due to the COVID-19 pandemic and subsequent shutdown measures. The tour was scheduled to kick off at Punk Rock Bowling featuring The Professionals, who formed following the dissolution of The Sex Pistols by founding members Steve Jones and Paul Cook. Unfortunately, this tour was also sidelined by pandemic shutdowns on live music venues and gatherings.

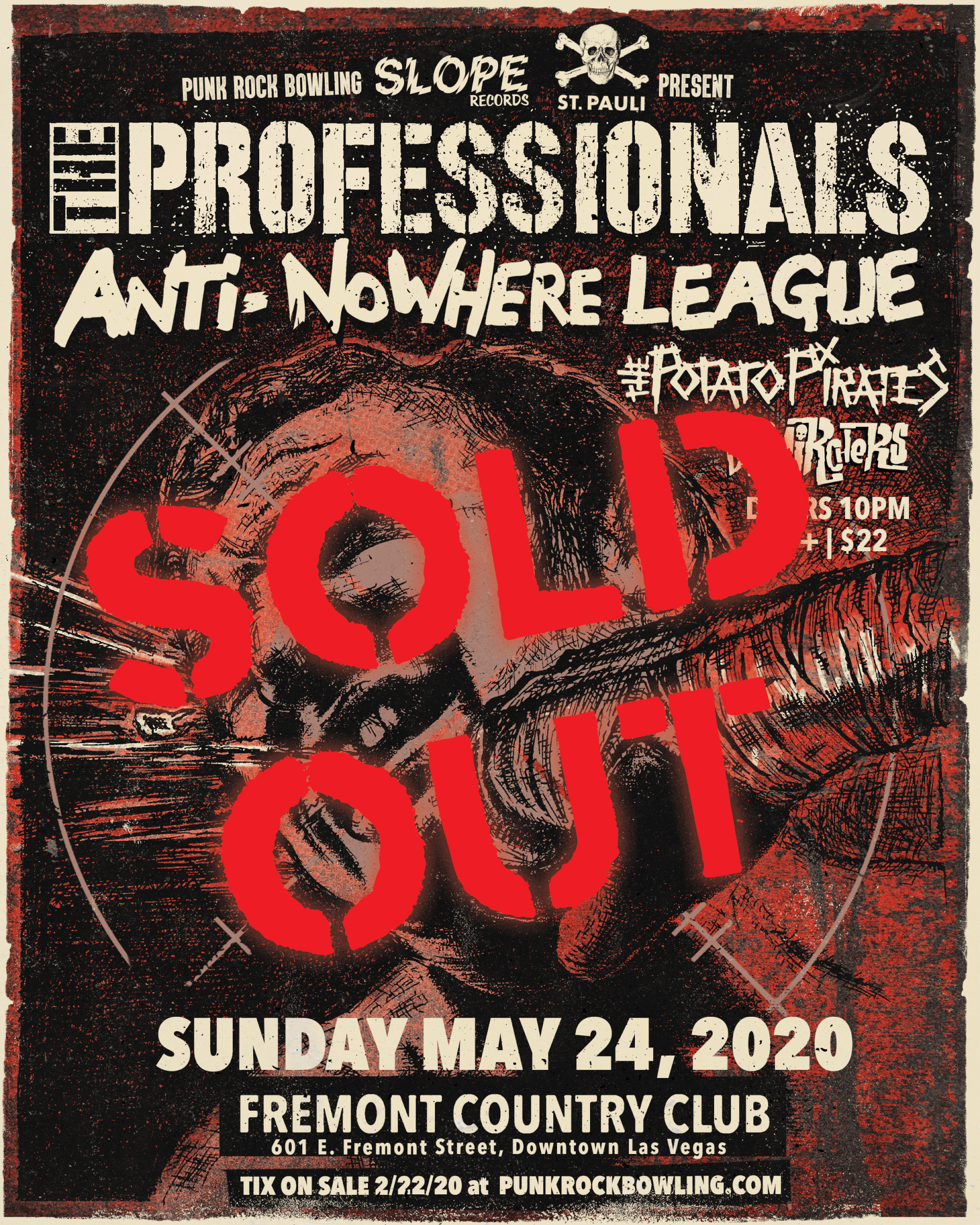
The Professionals Sold Out

Exterminators

Feederz

On Friday 13 December 2019, TSOL's ‘Ghost Train’ EP became the LA Punks first release on Slope Records. A culmination of goth, punk, and new wave blend, ‘Ghost Train,’ continues their SoCal Punk legacy. TSOL's roots are in the late 70's LA Punk Scene. Pressed on translucent blue vinyl, ‘Ghost Train’ is informed by TSOL's roots while bringing their sound into the 21st century.

== Slope Press ==
In 2026, Slope Records expanded into book publishing with the founding of Slope Press. The imprint was established to publish literature, photography, and cultural histories focusing on punk subculture, independent art, and underground movements. The imprint's forthcoming debut title, Anti Anti Anti: The Birth of Phoenix Punk (1977–1980) by Thomas Lopez, is scheduled for publication in 2027.

== Associated bands ==
- Surfbort
- FuckEmos
- Mighty Sphincter
- Our Neighbors Suck (ONS)
- The Christian Family
- Scorpion Vs Tarantula
- Useless Pieces of Shit (UPS)
- Mighty Sphincter
- Besmirchers
- Feederz
- The Father Figures
- Red Squares
- The Bulemics
- The Scandals
- ManHands
- Nip Drivers
- Exterminators
- Insurrection
- Freaks of Nature
- The Brainz
- Sad Kid
- The Linecutters
- Political Crap
- Dead 77
- The Freeze
- The Cocky Bitches
- U.S. Bombs
- Duane Peters Gunfight

== Discography ==
Release number	Year	Title	Artist	Format	Notes
Slope001	2015	LTC203	Insurrection	7-inch EP	Only official release for mid-80s Tempe via Sedona hardcore band
Slope002	2015	Hard On Love	Besmirchers	7-inch EP	Gatefold, Tucson punks featuring Lenny Mental who was once on Jerry Springer
Slope003	2015	Modern Roll / Time Change	Red Squares	7-inch EP	Limited edition re-release with gatefold cover and Red vinyl. Originally featured on the #10 and #666 editions of the Killed By Death compilations.
SLOPE04	2016	Surfbort	Surfbort	7-inch EP	Gatefold. Debut self-titled four-track EP by the Brooklyn, New York punk band.
Slope005	2016	Something Wicked This Way Comes	The Bulemics	12-inch LP	Oxblood vinyl
Slope006	2016	Skullcrusher	O.N.S.	10-inchEP	Six song limited edition EP from Arizona's Our Neighbors Suck.
Slope007	2016	w.a.g.p.s.g.?	Fuckemos	7-inch EP	Limited edition orange vinyl re-release on orange vinyl
Slope008	2016	Undead at Hammersmith Odeon 1987	Mighty Sphincter	12-inch LP	Live Mighty Sphincter hoax record. Gatefold. Actually recorded in Atlanta, Georgia.
Slope009	2016	Ugly in Public	U.P.S.	7-inch EP	First time on vinyl, this is Tucson's Useless Pieces of Shit at their fastest and nastiest.
Slope010	2016	Can Kill You	Fuckemos	12-inch LP	Re-issue on silver vinyl from 1994.
Slope011	2016	Scorpion Vs. Tarantula	Scorpion Vs Tarantula	10-inch EP	Limited edition six song EP from Arizona's SVT.
Slope012	2016	This Country Is Going To Hell	Scandals TX	7-inch EP	Gatefold
Slope013					
Slope014	2016	Lifestyles Of The Drugged And Homeless	Fuckemos	12-inch LP	Gold vinyl re-issue of Fuckemo's 1995 CD.
Slope015		Tape 2	Fuckemos	12-inch LP	Purple vinyl
Slope016	2016	The Christian Family	The Christian Family	7-inch EP	Limited edition on avocado green vinyl.
Slope017	2016				
Slope018	2016	Destroy Whitey	Nip Drivers	12-inch EP	White vinyl re-issue of Nip Drivers' 1984 classic.
Slope019	2016	Oh Blessed Freak Show	Nip Drivers	12-inch LP	Red vinyl re-issue of Nip Drivers' 1985 classic.
Slope020	2016	Freaks Of Nature	Freaks of Nature	7-inch EP	Limited edition
Slope021	2016	Brainz	Brainz	7-inch EP	Re-issue of classic Phoenix prog-punks featuring Doug Clark of Mighty Sphincter/Exterminators
Slope022	2016	Product of America	Exterminators	12-inch LP	First wave Phoenix punk rock featuring Don Bolles (Germs), Cris Kirkwood (Meat Puppets), Buzzy Murder (AKA Doug Clark, Mighty Sphincter), and Johnny Macho (AKA Dan Clark, Feederz).
Slope023	2016	Fox On The Run	Nip Drivers	7-inch EP	Limited edition. First time on vinyl since 1985.
Slope024	2017	Slow Death	Political Crap	7-inch EP	Duane Peters' first band. Red vinyl.
Slope025	2017	San Francisco	Fire Sports	7-inch EP	1984 recording of Duane Peters' second band.
Slope026	2017	Pirates of Suburbia	The Linecutters	7-inch EP	Orange vinyl
Slope027					
Slope028	2017	WWHD: What Would Hitler Do?	Feederz	7-inch EP	Orange vinyl. First new music from Feederz for over 15 years.
Slope029	2017	Heavy Lifting	The Father Figures	12-inch LP	Featuring Michael Cornelius of JFA and Tom Reardon of North Side Kings
Slope030	2017	Anthill	The Linecutters	12-inch LP	Produced by Cris Kirkwood (Meat Puppets)
Slope034	2018	TV's OK	Cocky Bitches	7-inch EP	Paul Leary (Butthole Surfers) new project
Slope035	2018	Phoenixotica	Moonlight Magic	12-inch LP	Debut LP Lounge/Exotica combo from Phoenix, Arizona
Slope036	2018	Clash Tribute	U.S. Bombs	7-inch EP	Cover songs of The Clash "Straight To Hell" and "Death Or Glory" white vinyl
Slope038	2018	Hollywood Gong Show	U.S. Bombs	7-inch EP	Baby blue vinyl
Slope42	2018	Mercy	Cocky Bitches	12-inch LP	Butthole Surfers’ guitarist Paul Leary and Cold drummer Sam McCandless with powerful punk siren The Baroness.
Slope44	2018	Road Case	U.S. Bombs	12-inch LP	First full-length LP since 2006

== Gallery ==
US Bombs: Clash Tribute

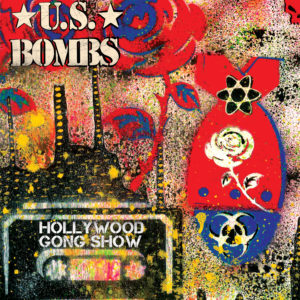
US Bombs: Hollywood Gong Show

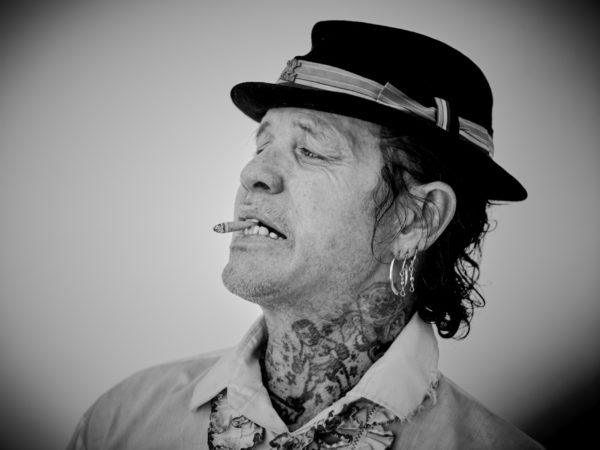
Duane Peters, 2017

Political Crap, Slow Death, 1980
