= Ave Vagabundo =

Studio album by Verónica Castro
- Released: 1999
- Recorded: 1998
- Genre: Bolero / Mambo / Tango
- Label: Sony Music Entertainment
- Producer: Ana Gabriel

Verónica Castro chronology
La Tocada (1997)	Ave Vagabundo (1999)	Imágenes (2002)

Ave Vagabundo (Wandering Bird) is the 16th album by Mexican singer Verónica Castro. It was released in 1999.

== Track listing ==
1. "Alguien Que No Soy Yo" (Juan Bautista)
2. "Mi Carta"
3. "Amor De un Rato"
4. "Mexi, Mexi (Mexe, Mexe)"
5. "Sacudelo (Mambo)"
6. "Entre Dos Amores"
7. "Ave Vagabundo (Nobre Vagabundo)"
8. "Yo, el Tango y Tu"
9. "Zumbalo"
10. "Vaquero de Asfalto (Cowboy de Asfalto)"

== Singles ==
#	Title
1.	"Zumbalo"
