= Viva la banda =

Viva La Banda

Studio album by Verónica Castro
- Released: January 17, 1990
- Recorded: 1990
- Genre: Banda
- Label: PolyGram

Verónica Castro chronology
| ¡Mamma Mia! (1988) | Viva La Banda (1990) | Mi Pequeña Soledad, (1990) |

Viva la Banda (Long Live the Band) is the 11th album by Mexican iconic pop singer Verónica Castro. It was released on Januari 17, 1990. "Caray" is a song by Juan Gabriel.

== Track listing ==
1. "Salud Dinero Y amor" (Rodolfo Sciamarella)
2. "Porurri" El Gallo Tuerto/ Mi Cafetal/ Cachita (Jose Barrios)
3. "Caray" (Juan Gabriel)
4. "Ni Porfavor (Si No Me Quieres Ni Modo)"
5. "Amor Chiquito"
6. "La Banda Dominguera"
7. "Porurri" Nana Pancha/ Yo Soy Quien Soy (Pichirilo -R. Ruiz)
8. "Esta Noche La Paso Contigo"
9. "Papalote / Copa Tras Copa"

== Singles ==
| # | Title |
|---|---|
| 1. | "Salud Dinero y amor" |
| 2. | "Caray" |
