= Tomorrow Will Be Better =

1985 Taiwanese Mandopop charity single

"明天會更好"

Single

from the album Tomorrow Will Be Better
- Language: Mandarin
- English title: Tomorrow Will Be Better
- Released: October 25, 1985
- Recorded: September 15, 1985
- Studio: Platinum Studio
- Genre: Mandopop
- Length: 5:26
- Label: Rock Records
- Songwriters: Lo Ta-Yu, Chang Ta-Chun, Hsu Nai-Sheng, Lee Shou-chuan, Chiu Fu-Sheng, Sylvia Chang, Zhang Hongzhi (Mandarin), Richard Lam (Cantonese)
- Producers: Lo Ta-yu, Lee Shou-chuan, Peng Kuo-Hua, Tuan Chung-Tan, Chen Chih-Yuan, Wu Zhengde, Sylvia Chang

Music video
- "Tomorrow Will Be Better" on YouTube

"Tomorrow Will Be Better" (Chinese: 明天會更好; pinyin: Míngtiān huì Gènghǎo) is a Taiwanese Mandopop charity record written by Lo Ta-Yu and sung by over 60 artists. It was inspired by "Do They Know It's Christmas?" by Band Aid, and "We Are The World" by USA for Africa. It was recorded on September 15, 1985 and released on October 25, 1985 in order to raise money for World Vision International to help with aid to Africa, especially for a famine in Ethiopia spanning from 1983 to 1985.

== Original lyrics ==
Lo Ta-Yu wrote and prepared the lyrics in advance before summoning more than 60 artists from Taiwan, Hong Kong, Singapore, and Malaysia to film a music video. They were much darker and felt much more hopeless than the final, published version. When Lo presented the lyrics, many of the artists quit on the spot as they were filled with criticisms of the society at the time. At the time, Taiwan was under martial law, so if the lyrics were not reworked, the artists may have faced various repercussions.

Lo was against self-censorship, even when many persuaded Lo to change the lyrics. He eventually reluctantly did, and as a result, six other artists and songwriters Chang Ta-chun, Hsu Nai-sheng, Lee Shou-chuan, Chiu Fu-sheng, Sylvia Chang, and Zhang Hongzhi came up to him to collaborate and rework the lyrics to be more positive for the song be approved for publishing.

Despite the long-term success of the song, in a later interview, Lo stated that he absolutely hated producing the song, as it was not filled with the direct bluntness and the sense of responsibility which had been present in the original lyrics.

== Artists ==
The song was originally sung in Mandarin Chinese and performed by the 60 artists. They were from the four main Chinese music industry markets of Hong Kong, Malaysia, Singapore and Taiwan.

Artist	Market	Song segment
Tsai Chin (蔡琴)	Taiwan	1st verse line 1; 3rd and 6th chorus
Yu Tian (余天)	Taiwan	1st verse line 2; 3rd, 5th and 6th chorus
Su Rui (蘇芮)	Taiwan	1st verse line 3; chorus; 3rd, 4th and 6th chorus; 6th and 7th harmony
Michelle Pan (潘越雲)	Taiwan	1st verse line 4; 3rd and 6th chorus
Jenny Tseng (甄妮)	Hong Kong	2nd verse line 1; 3rd and 6th chorus
Li Jianfu (李建复)	Taiwan	2nd verse line 2/4; 3rd and 6th chorus
Monique Lin (林慧萍)	Taiwan	2nd verse line 3; 3rd and 6th chorus
Jeanette Wang (王芷蕾)	Taiwan	2nd verse line 4; 3rd and 6th chorus
Tracy Huang (黃鶯鶯)	Taiwan	1st chorus line 1-2; 3rd and 6th chorus
Chris Hung (洪榮宏)	Taiwan	1st chorus line 3-4; 3rd and 6th chorus
Sarah Chen (陳淑樺)	Taiwan	3rd verse line 1; 3rd and 6th chorus
Wawa (金智娟/娃娃)	Taiwan	3rd verse line 2; 3rd and 6th chorus
Wang Mon Ling (王夢麟)	Taiwan	3rd verse line 3-4; 3rd and 6th chorus
Lee Pei-jing (李佩菁)	Taiwan	3rd verse line 4; 3rd and 6th chorus
Fei Yu-Ching (費玉清)	Taiwan	2nd, 3rd and 6th chorus
Chyi Yu (齊豫)	Taiwan	4th verse line 1; 3rd and 6th chorus
Jeng Yi (鄭怡)	Taiwan	4th verse line 2; 3rd and 6th chorus
Jody Chiang (江蕙)	Taiwan	4th verse line 3; 3rd and 6th chorus
Yang Lin (楊林)		4th verse line 4; 3rd and 6th chorus
Chyi Chin (齊秦)	Taiwan	3rd and 4th chorus; 5th and 7th harmony
Eric Moo (巫啟賢)	Malaysia	3rd and 6th chorus
Bao Xiaosong (包小松)	Taiwan	3rd and 6th chorus
Bao Xiaobo (包小柏)	Taiwan	3rd and 6th chorus
Sunnie Wang (王日昇)	Taiwan	3rd and 6th chorus
Wen Zhang (文章)	Indonesia/Taiwan	3rd and 6th chorus
Ng Guan Seng (黃元成) from Straw (水草三重唱)	Singapore	3rd and 6th chorus
Billy Koh (许环良) from Straw (水草三重唱)	Singapore	3rd and 6th chorus
John Koh (许南盛) from Straw (水草三重唱)	Singapore	3rd and 6th chorus
Bao Weiming (包偉銘)	Taiwan	3rd and 6th chorus
江音傑		3rd and 6th chorus
Jonathan Lee (李宗盛)	Taiwan	3rd and 6th chorus
吳大衛		3rd and 6th chorus
林禹勝		3rd and 6th chorus
Shi Hsiao-rong (施孝榮)	Taiwan	3rd and 6th chorus
岳雷	Singapore	3rd and 6th chorus
Hsu Nai-lin (徐乃麟)	Taiwan	3rd and 6th chorus
徐瑋		3rd and 6th chorus
姚乙	Malaysia	3rd and 6th chorus
陳黎鐘		3rd and 7th chorus
黃慧文		3rd and 6th chorus
張海漢		3rd and 6th chorus
Angus Tung (童安格)	Taiwan	3rd and 6th chorus
楊烈		3rd and 6th chorus
楊耀東		3rd and 6th chorus
廖小維		3rd and 6th chorus
羅吉鎮		3rd and 6th chorus
鍾有道		3rd and 6th chorus
Sylvia Chang 張艾嘉		3rd and 6th chorus
Stella Chang (張清芳)	Taiwan	3rd and 6th chorus
成鳳		3rd and 6th chorus
李靜 (from 百合二重唱)	Taiwan	3rd and 6th chorus
周月綺 (from 百合二重唱)	Taiwan	3rd and 6th chorus
Li Bihua 李碧華	Taiwan	3rd and 6th chorus
何春蘭		3rd and 6th chorus
芊苓		3rd and 6th chorus
林淑蓉		3rd and 6th chorus
Tai Zhoumei 邰肇玫	Taiwan	3rd and 6th chorus
唐曉詩		3rd and 6th chorus
麥瑋婷		3rd and 6th chorus
許慧慧		3rd and 6th chorus
賴佩霞		3rd and 6th chorus
Pauline Lan (藍心湄)	Taiwan	3rd and 6th chorus

In 1985, various Hong Kong singers sang a re-written Cantonese version of the song in 1985 Jade Solid Gold Awards Presentation. In 2010, many Taiwanese singers made their own music video versions of the song. In 1991, this song is performed by Xiaozhu in Taiwanese film Dragon Ball: The Magic Begins.
