= Cantaré, cantarás =

"Cantaré, cantarás (I Will Sing, You Will Sing)"

Single by Hermanos
- B-side: African Flame (Herb Alpert)
- Released: 1985
- Recorded: April 1985
- Studio: A&M, Hollywood
- Genre: Pop
- Length: 5:35
- Label: CBS; A&M
- Songwriter(s): Albert Hammond, Juan Carlos Calderón, Anahí van Zandweghe
- Producer(s): Albert Hammond; Humberto Gatica; Luis Medina; José Quintana

Music video
- "Cantaré, cantarás" on YouTube

"Cantaré, cantarás" (I Will Sing, You Will Sing) is a single by various Latin American icons called circumstantially "Hermanos", and it was released in 1985. The B-side is conformed by Herb Alpert's "African Flame". The song was considered as an LP and peaked number 12 in Billboard's Latin Pop Albums in September 1985.

== Background ==
"Cantaré, Cantarás" was recorded with the purpose of raising funds to boost the campaigns of the United Nations Children's Fund (UNICEF) in Latin America. Producers Albert Hammond, José Quintana, Manuel Montoya, Peter Lopez, Luis Medina, and Jose Behar, co-founders of non-profit organization HERMANOS, producers of "Cantare, Cantaras" were in charge of the project, bringing together more than 50 Spanish-speaking music artists. Recording was engineered by Humberto Gatica.

The project was inspired by the recording of USA For Africa "We Are The World" which had been recorded same year, 1985. Idea came about when Manuel Montoya, manager for Albert Hammond at the time, assigned the Lani Hall, A&M artist, also managed by Montoya, recording project later entitled, "Es Facil Amar", to Hammond. The Grammy Award winning effort contained collaborations by Roberto Carlos and Jose Feliciano. Hermanos non-profit organization set up an office in Burbank, CA and assigned Luis Medina to handle day-to-day operations for the group, authorized signatories were, Luis Medina, Peter, Lopez and Manuel Montoya. Recording took place in April 1985.

The LP/single is considered the Latin American version of "We Are the World". It was recorded in Los Angeles in April 1985, at A&M Studios, the same studio used for "We Are the World".

It was composed by Albert Hammond, Juan Carlos Calderón and Anahí van Zandweghe,.

A behind the scenes special of making of the record was filmed in La Paz, Bolivia, hosted by Ricardo Montalban and executive produced by Luis Medina, Peter Lopez and Manuel Montoya.

Earnings were donated to UNICEF for distribution to charitable organizations in Latin America.

== Music video ==
The music video for "Cantaré, Cantarás" was recorded in the same location of "We Are The World".

== Track listing ==
7" single
No.	Title	Length
1.	"Cantaré, Cantarás (I Will Sing, You Will Sing)"	5:35
2.	"African Flame" (produced by Herb Alpert, John Barnes; written by H. Alpert, J. Barnes)	4:40
Total length:		7:05

== Personnel ==
Credits adapted from Cantaré, Cantarás (I Will Sing, You Will Sing) liner notes.

Vocals (in alphabetic order)

- Fernando Allende
- María Conchita Alonso
- Apollonia Kotero
- Ramón Arcusa
- Basilio
- Braulio
- Cantinflas
- Irene Cara
- Roberto Carlos
- Nydia Caro
- Vikki Carr
- Verónica Castro
- Charytín
- Chiquetete
- Claudia de Colombia
- Gal Costa
- Celia Cruz
- Lupita D'Alessio
- Guillermo Dávila
- Plácido Domingo
- Emmanuel
- Sergio Facheli
- José Feliciano
- Vicente Fernández
- Miguel Gallardo
- Lucho Gatica
- Julio Iglesias
- Antonio de Jesús
- José José
- Rocío Jurado
- Lissette
- Valeria Lynch
- Cheech Marin
- Sérgio Mendes
- Lucía Méndez
- Menudo (with Ricky Martin and Robi Draco Rosa, Roy Rossello, Raymond Acevedo and Charlie Masso, group members during 1985.)
- Miami Sound Machine
- Amanda Miguel
- Ricardo Montalbán
- Palito Ortega
- Pimpinela (Lucía y Joaquín Galán)
- Tony Renis
- Danny Rivera
- José Luis Rodríguez
- Lalo Schifrin
- Simone
- Manoella Torres
- Pedro Vargas
- Diego Verdaguer
- Yuri (Mexican singer)

Musicians

- David Foster – keyboards, synthesizer
- Greg Phillinganes – keyboard, synthesizer
- John Robinson – drums
- José Feliciano – Spanish guitar
- Nathan East – electric bass
- Carlos Rios– guitar
- Abraham Laboriel - (bass)

== Charts ==
Chart (1985)	Peak position
US Latin Pop Albums (Billboard)	12
