= Surfbort =

American punk rock band

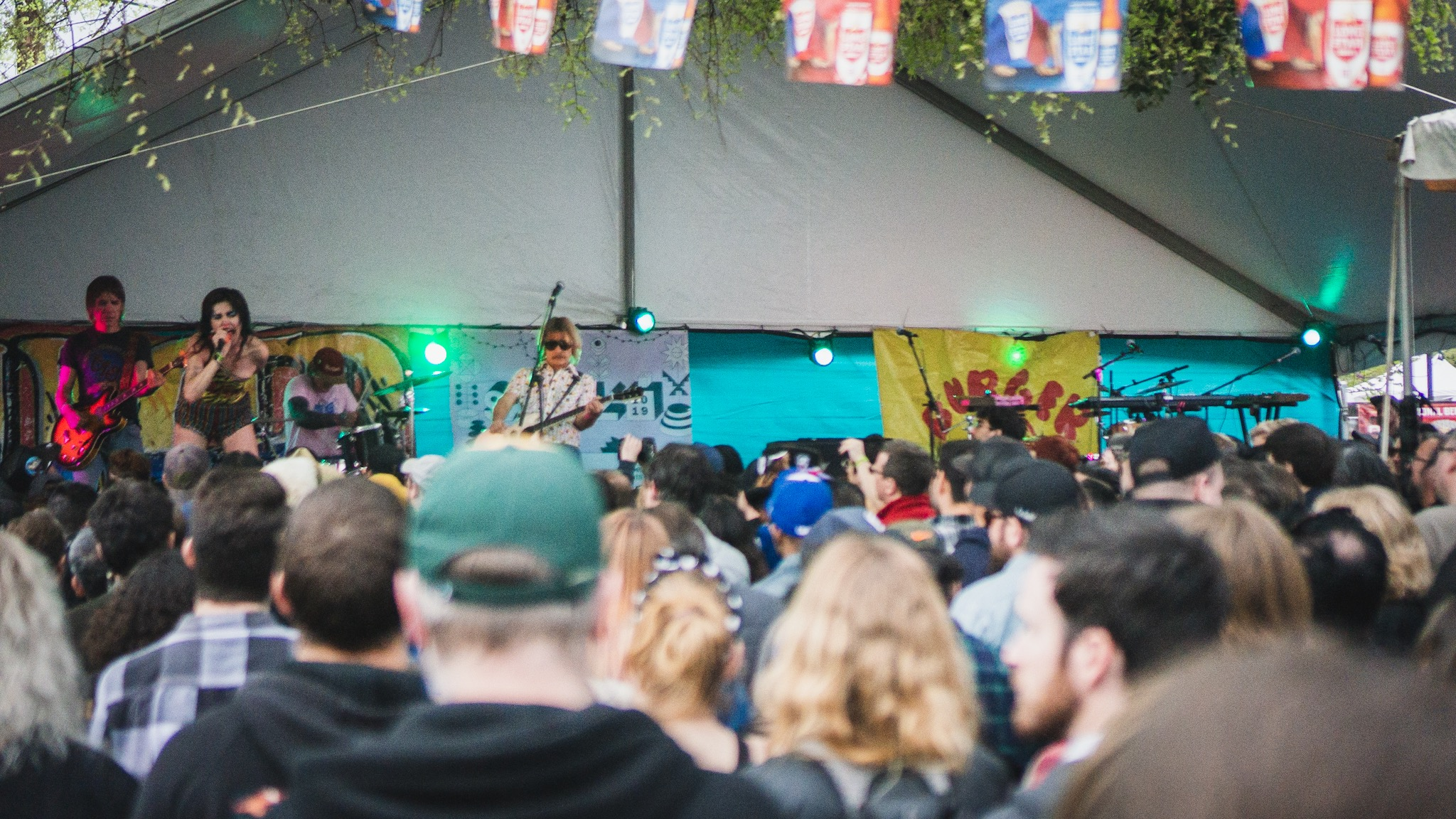
- Surfbort at SXSW 2019

Background information
- Origin: Brooklyn, New York, United States
- Genres: Punk rock
- Years active: 2014–present
- Labels: Cult Records, Slope Records, Rough Trade Records
- Members: Dani Miller; Alex Kilgore; Sean Powell; Matt Picola; Nick Arnold

Surfbort is an American punk rock band formed in Brooklyn, New York in 2014 by vocalist Dani Miller. They were featured in a campaign by Gucci, and members of Blondie have named the band as a favorite of theirs. They have released music with Cult Records, Roolette Records, Rough Trade Records, Muddguts Records, Fat Possum Records, and Slope Records.

== Biography ==
Surfbort was formed in 2014 by lead singer Dani Miller when she was at a gig looking for acts to perform. The group got their name from the Beyoncé song "Drunk in Love". They began releasing music with the single "Trash" in 2015, followed by their self-titled debut EP on Slope Records.

Texan Sean Powell joined the band on drums in September 2015. In February 2016 the original guitarist Matt Picola left the band and Powell asked fellow Texan Alex Kilgore to come in on guitar.

In 2017, the band performed at the Coachella Festival.

Their debut album, Friendship Music, was released in 2018 on Cult Records.

In 2019, the band was featured prominently in Gucci’s Pre-Fall 2019 campaign photographed in Sicily, after previously performing at the opening of Gucci’s Wooster Street store in New York.

Surfbort toured internationally during this period, performing with acts such as Idles, Interpol, Wolf Alice, Descendents, Amyl and the Sniffers, Black Lips, Tropical Fuck Storm, Iceage, and Starcrawler.

In 2020, original guitarist Matt Picola rejoined the band, and former roadie Nick Arnold became the group’s bassist.

Surfbort recorded their second studio album, Keep On Truckin', with producer Linda Perry in 2021. The track “Open Your Eyes” from the album was added to the video game Rocket League in 2022, and the band appeared on the Grouplove song “Just What You Want” the same year.

In 2025, Surfbort announced their third studio album, Reality Star, scheduled for release on March 6, 2026 through TODO Records. The lead single, "Lucky", was issued alongside a music video directed by Pooneh Ghana. Miller described the track as a "delusional pep talk" during a difficult personal moment.

== Discography ==
=== Albums ===
- Friendship Music (October 26, 2018)
- Keep On Truckin' (October 11, 2021)
- Reality Star (March 6, 2026)

=== EPs ===
- Surfbort 7" (January 20, 2016)
- Bort to Death (September 22, 2017)
- Billy (March 29, 2019)
- You Don't Exist (May 24, 2019)
- Apocalypse Care Package - DEMOS (May 1, 2020)

=== Singles ===
- "Trash" (September 30, 2015)
- "Les Be in Love" (February 14, 2018)
- "45" (June 12, 2018)
- "Pretty Little Fucker" (September 13, 2018)
- "Fetus" (September 14, 2018)
- "Trashworld" (September 27, 2018)
- "Slushy" (October 10, 2018)
- "Selfie" (October 25, 2018)
- "Billy" (February 15, 2019)
- "HOT ON THE SCENE" (October 16, 2019)
- "Silly D" (September 4, 2020)
- "Condom With No Cum" (November 6, 2020)
- "White Claw Enema Bong Hit" (2021)
- "USA Cheese" (May 14, 2025)
