= Bill Gibson (music producer) =

American music producer (born 1955)

Bill Gibson (born September 8, 1955) is an American music producer, and an accomplished musician and teacher. He is the author of books and videos about audio recording and live sound.

== History ==
Gibson started playing drums and guitar when he was nine years old. He performed in various bands, including The Dukes, Dick and the Dutchmasters, The Sons of Liberty, Strawberry Jam, Midnight Magic, Collage, Rival, Kevin Katz, and Larry Collins. He attended Green River College, Western Washington University, and The Evergreen State College and received his Bachelor of Arts degree from Evergreen in Composition and Arranging. From 1978 to 1981 he was an instructor at Green River College in Auburn, Washington.

Gibson is president of Northwest Music and Recording.

In addition to being an instructor for Berklee Online and acting technical director or performer for various groups, Gibson:

- Is an author of a 3-book series with Quincy Jones, in which Quincy shares the insights and knowledge he has gained about producing, film scoring, and writing music. The first offering in the series, Q on Producing, released at AES in San Francisco (11-4-2010)
- Is an active music producer for acts including 11 albums for The Coats (On Christmastime, Last a Lifetime, The Caroler, The Boys Are Back, and 7 more), 2 albums for Jamie Dieveney (Beautiful You, Heaven's Not Too Far Away), Glimpse (See Without Sight), Robbie Ott (In the Presence), and many more.
- Was the liaison between the professional audio community and The Art Institute of Seattle from August 29, 2007 – December 31, 2010
- Is the chairman of the Producer & Engineer committee and on the Board of Governors for the Pacific Northwest Chapter of the National Academy of Recording Arts and Sciences
- Is a member of the Audio Engineering Society, the Society of Broadcast Engineers, and a voting member of The Recording Academy
- Is a National Trustee for The Recording Academy from 2012 to 2014

Musical productions include albums for Tony Moore, Keith Anderson and Larry Collins.

== Bibliography ==
Book and video titles by Bill Gibson include:

- Killer Demos: Hot Tips and Cool Secrets for the Home Multitrack User - Self-produced, published, and distributed along with partner, Bob Sluys for Bill & Bob's Excellent Productions
- The Hit Sound Recording Course - Published and distributed by Alexander Publishing
- The AudioPro Home Recording Course - Volumes 1, 2 and 3 Published by MixBooks and distributed by Hal Leonard Publishing
- The 12-Volume InstantPro Sound Advice Series - Published by MixBooks and distributed by Hal Leoanard Publishing
- The 6-Volume S.M.A.R.T. Guide series - Published by Thomson Publishing's Course Technologies - distributed by Hal Leoanard Publishing
- The 6-Volume Hal Leonard Recording Method by Bill Gibson - Published and distributed by Hal Leonard Publishing
- The Ultimate Church Sound Operator's Handbook - Published and distributed by Hal Leonard Publishing
- The Ultimate Live Sound Operator's Handbook - Published and distributed by Hal Leonard Publishing
- The Quincy Jones Legacy Series: Book 1 - Q on Producing by Quincy Jones and Bill Gibson - Published and distributed by Hal Leonard Publishing
- The Bruce Swedien Recording Method by Bruce Swedien and Bill Gibson - Published and distributed by Hal Leonard Books.
