= Oscar De La Rosa =

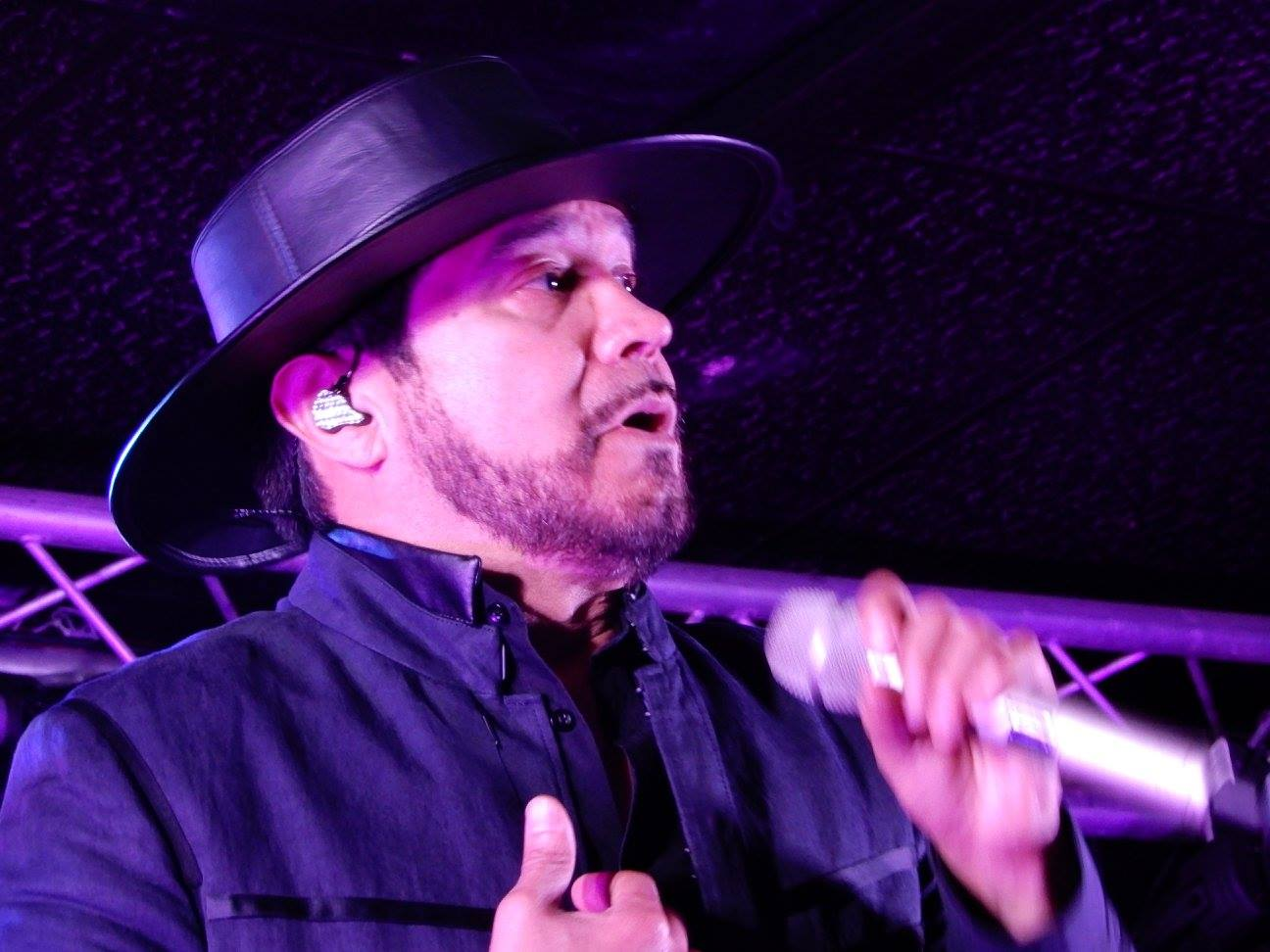
- Oscar De La Rosa Lead Vocalist of La Mafia

Background information
- Born: Oscar De La Rosa Gonzales; March 29, 1960 (age 66)
- Origin: Houston, Texas, United States
- Genres: Tejano, Latin pop
- Instrument: Vocals
- Label: Urbana Records
- Member of: La Mafia

Oscar De La Rosa (born Oscar De La Rosa Gonzales; March 29, 1960) is the Tejano lead singer of the five-time Grammy Award-winning musical group La Mafia. He is also the brother of Leonardo Gonzales who is the former guitarist of La Mafia and founder of Leonardo Gonzales y Los Magnificos.

== Involvement with La Mafia ==
La Mafia was founded in 1980 in Houston, Texas. Back home, La Mafia has performed in front of three record-setting crowds at the Houston Livestock Show and Rodeo at the Houston Astrodome. La Mafia has also played at the Houston Astrodome along with Emilio Navaira and Selena Quintanilla He is the leader of La Mafia alongside Armando Lichtenberger Jr. and is close friends.

So far they've had 37 albums from 1980 to current. Their best albums are The Magnificent 7 (1982), Neon Static (1985), Xplosiv (1989), Enter the Future (1990), Con Tanto Amor (1990), Vida (1994), Exitos en vivo (1995), En Tus Manos (1997), Inconfundible (2001), Eternamente Romanticos (2008), and Amor y Sexo (2014)

== Personal life ==
Mrs. Delia Guebara Owens, ex-girlfriend of Oscar and mother of his two children (Henri and Oscar Jr.), died on Friday February 27, 2009 at 4:20 PM. Oscar dedicated "Si Quiere Dios" to her as a tribute to the mother of his sons and the woman who inspired him when he first started out, and who remained his dear friend.

On Monday May 15, 2013 Oscar De La Rosa was attacked outside a Houston bar called the Blur Bar. After the attack, De La Rosa had facial cuts, eye damage and two lost teeth.
