= Grammy Award for Best Mexican/Mexican-American Album =

Music award category

- Awarded for: Quality albums in the Mexican music genre
- Country: United States
- Presented by: National Academy of Recording Arts and Sciences
- First award: 1984
- Final award: 2008
- Website: grammy.com

The Grammy Award for Best Mexican/Mexican-American Album was an award presented to recording artists for quality albums in the Mexican American music genre at the Grammy Awards, a ceremony that was established in 1958 and originally called the Gramophone Awards. Honors in several categories are presented at the ceremony annually by the National Academy of Recording Arts and Sciences of the United States to "honor artistic achievement, technical proficiency and overall excellence in the recording industry, without regard to album sales or chart position".

Since its inception, the award category has had several name changes. From 1984 to 1991 the award was known as Best Mexican-American Performance. From 1992 to 1994 it was awarded as Best Mexican-American Album. In 1995 it returned to the title Best Mexican-American Performance. From 1996 to 1998 it was awarded as Best Mexican-American/Tejano Music Performance. In 1999, the category name was changed to Best Mexican-American Music Performance, and in 2000 it returned to the title Best Mexican-American Performance once again. From 2001 to 2008 the award was presented as Best Mexican/Mexican-American Album. In 2009, the category was split into two new fields: Best Norteño Album and Best Regional Mexican Album.

Mexican-American artist Flaco Jiménez is the most-awarded performer in the category with four wins, twice as a solo performer and twice as member of Texas Tornados and Los Super Seven. He is followed by fellow Mexican-American performer Pepe Aguilar with three winning albums and by American singers Vikki Carr and Linda Ronstadt, Mexican singers Luis Miguel and Joan Sebastian, and bands La Mafia and Los Lobos, with two wins each. Mexican ranchera performer Vicente Fernández was the most nominated artist without a win with ten unsuccessful nominations.

== Recipients ==
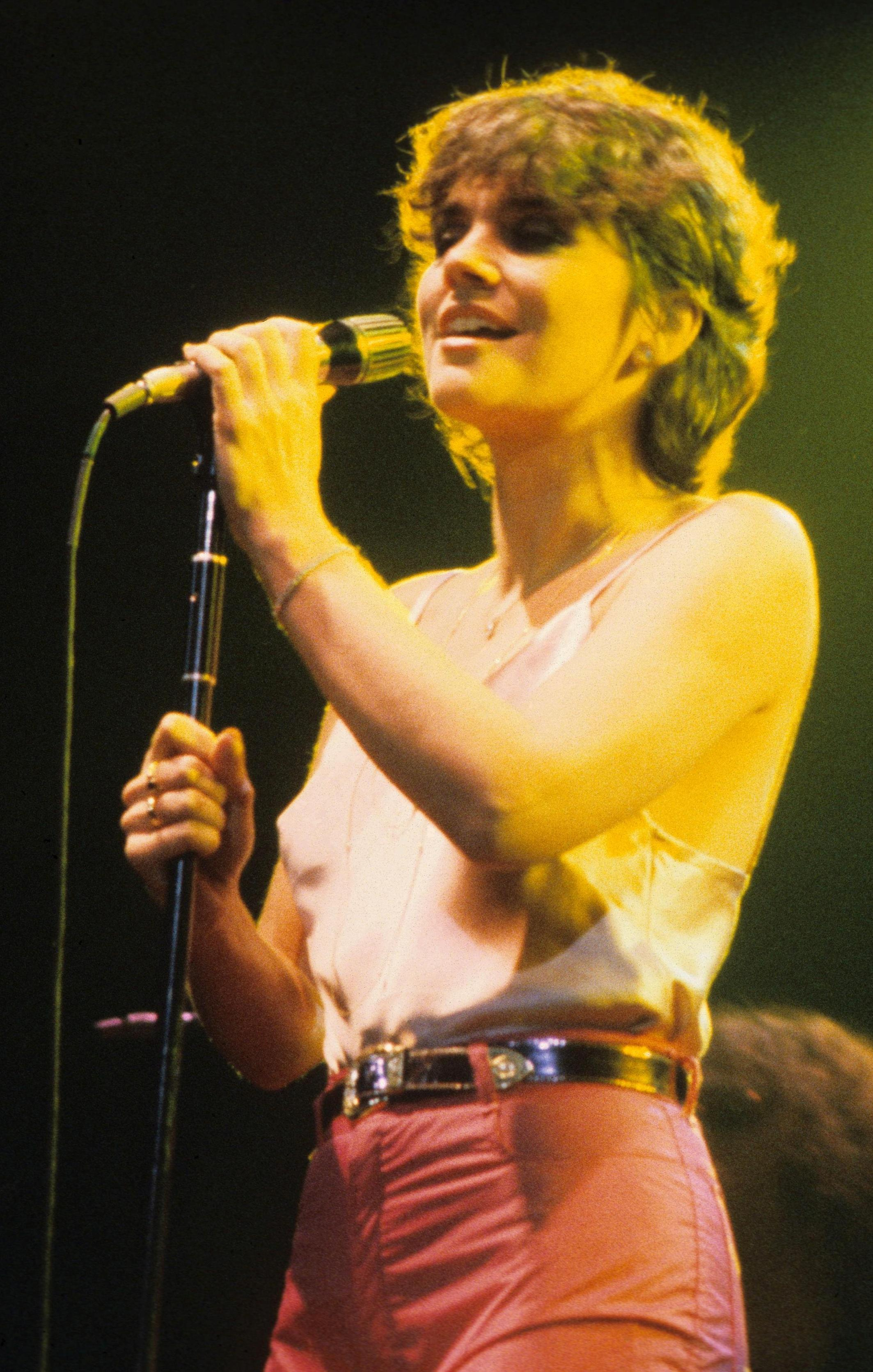
Two-time award winner Linda Ronstadt performing in 1976

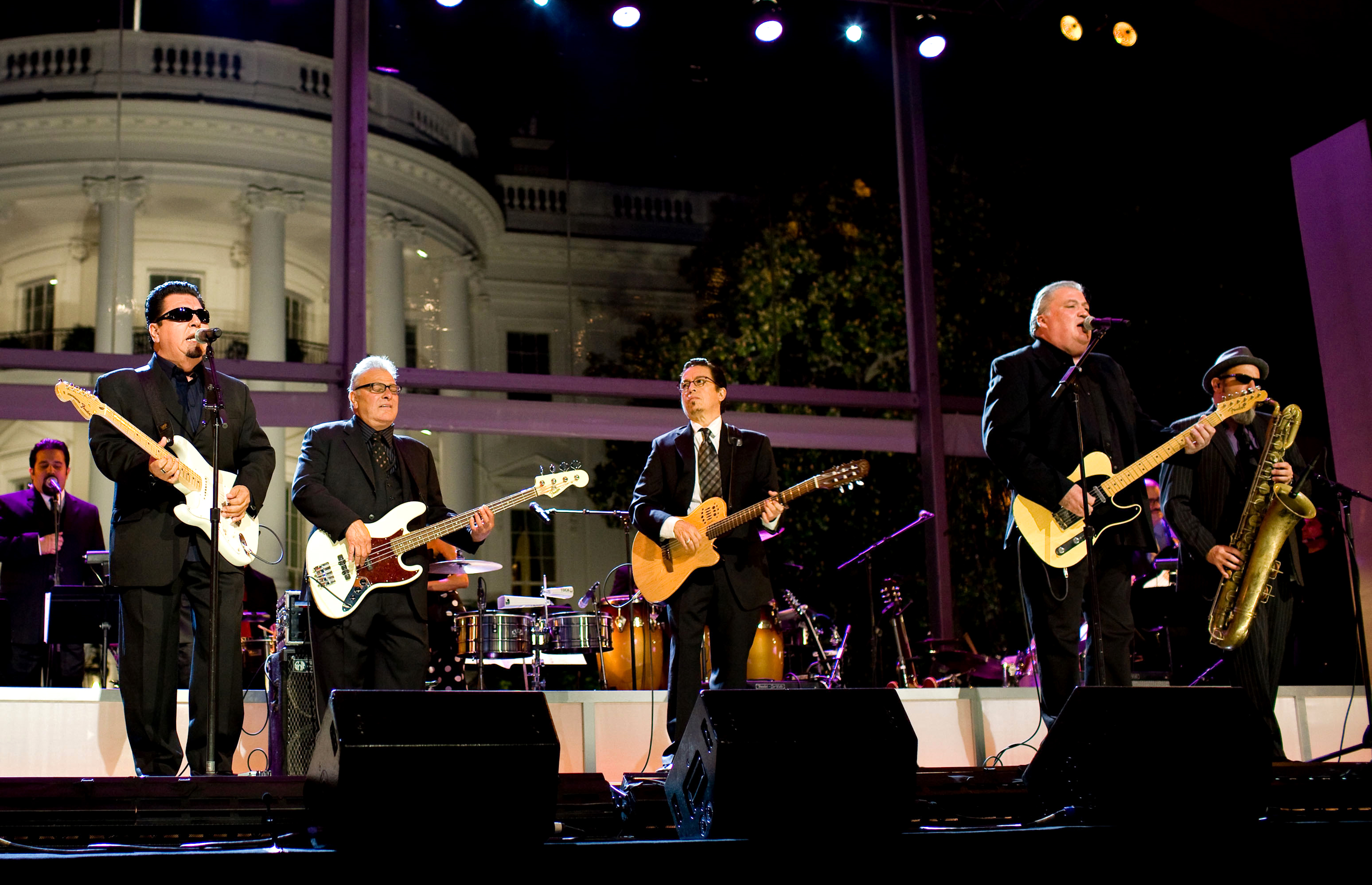
Members of the two-time award-winning band Los Lobos performing at the White House in 2009

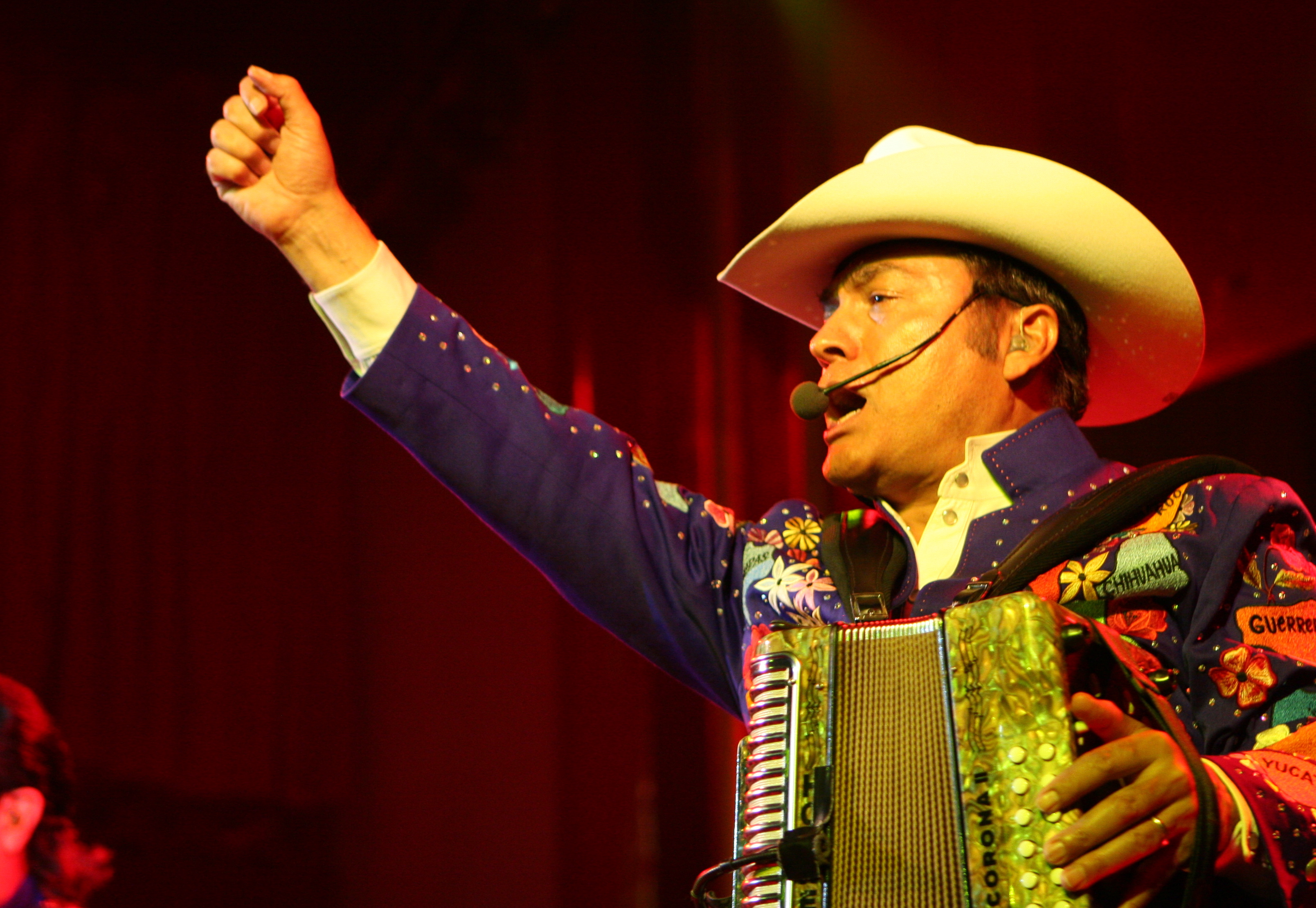
Jorge Hernández of the 1988 award-winning group Los Tigres del Norte, performing in 2008

Oscar de la Rosa of the two-time award-winning band La Mafia

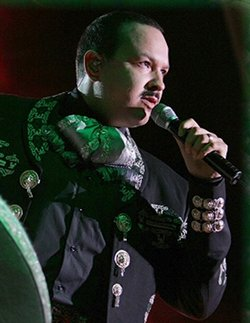
Three-time award winner Pepe Aguilar performing in 2010

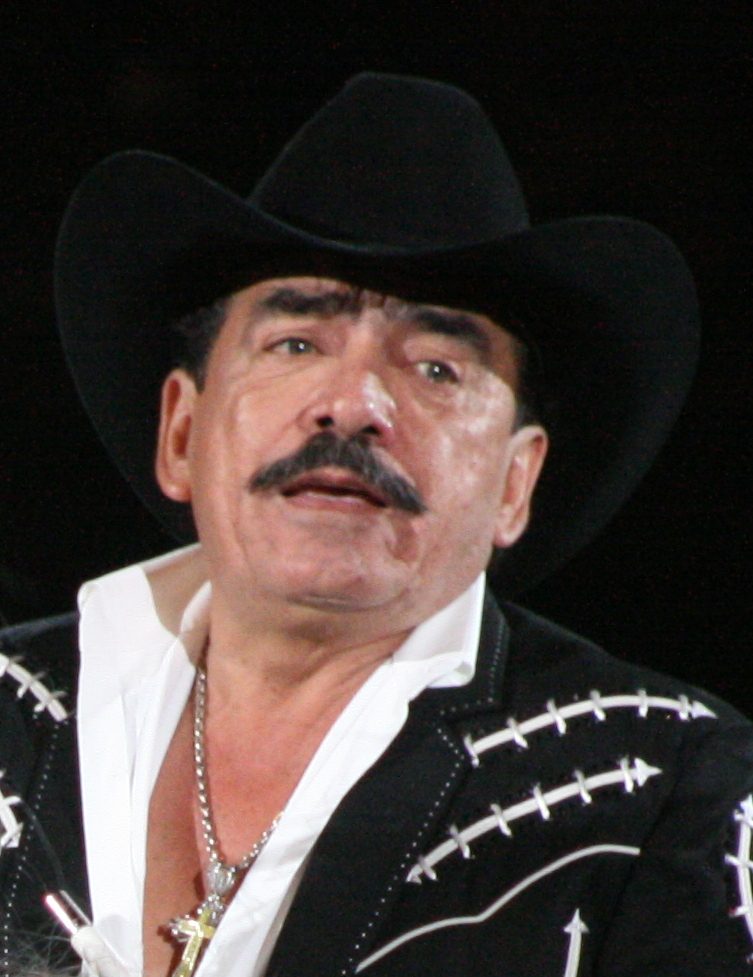
Two-time award winner Joan Sebastian performing in 2009

Year	Performing artist(s)	Work	Nominees	Ref.
1984	Los Lobos	"Anselma"	Chelo – "A Cambio de Qué"; Vicente Fernández – ...Es La Diferencia; Juan Gabriel – Todo; Los Bukis – Yo Te Necesito	
1985	Sheena Easton and Luis Miguel	"Me Gustas Tal Como Eres"	Roberto Carlos – "Cóncavo y Convexo"; Yolanda del Río – "Un Amor Especial"; Juan Gabriel – Recuerdos II; Raphael – Eternamente Tuyo	
1986	Vikki Carr	Simplemente Mujer	Rocío Dúrcal – Canta a Juan Gabriel; María de Lourdes – Mujer Importante; Los Humildes – 13 Aniversario/13 Album/13 Exitos; Santiago Jiménez Jr. – Santiago Strikes Again; Juan Valentín – 20 Exitos Románticos con Juan Valentín	
1987	Flaco Jiménez	Ay Te Dejo en San Antonio y Más!	Rafael Buendia – Y... Zas!; Steve Jordan – Turn Me Loose; Los Tigres del Norte – El Otro México; Los Yonic's – Corazón Vacío; Salvador Torres – Unidos Cantemos; Juan Valentín – Juan Valentín	
1988	Los Tigres del Norte	Gracias!... América... Sin Fronteras	Antonio Aguilar – 15 Exitos con Tambora, Vol. 2; Chavela y su Grupo Express – El Rey del Barrio; Little Joe – Timeless; Los Diablos – Celebración	
1989	Linda Ronstadt	Canciones de Mi Padre	Flaco Jiménez – Flaco's Amigos; Los Bukis – Si Me Recuerdas; Los Freddy's – Vida Nueva; Los Tigres del Norte – Ídolos del Pueblo; Los Yonic's – Pétalo y Espinas; José Javier Solís – No Me Olvidarás; Pio Treviño and Majic – "Quiero Verte Otra Vez"	
1990	Los Lobos	La Pistola y El Corazón	Los Tigres del Norte – Corridos Prohibidos; Narciso Martínez – The Father of Tex-Mex Conjunto; Emilio Navaira & Rio Band – Emilio Navaira & Rio Band; Pedro Rubalcava – Amanecer	
1991	Texas Tornados	"Soy de San Luis"	Vicente Fernández – Las Clásicas de José Alfredo Jiménez; Santiago Jiménez Jr. – Familia y Tradición; Los Diablos – Nuestro Tiempo; Mazz – "Amor con Amor"	
1992	Little Joe	16 de Septiembre	La Sombra – Porque Te Quiero; Los Tigres del Norte – Para Adoloridos; Mazz – Para Nuestra Gente	
1993	Linda Ronstadt	Mas Canciones	Los Diablos – Un Nuevo Comienzo; Los Tigres del Norte – Con Sentimiento y Sabor; Emilio Navaira – Unsung Highways; Mingo Saldivary y sus Tremendos Cuatro Espadas – I Love My Freedom, I Love My Texas	
1994	Selena	Selena Live!	Vicente Fernández – Lástima Que Seas Ajena; Santiago Jiménez Jr. – Corazón de Piedra; Little Joe – ¿Qué Pasó?; Pedro Fernández – Lo Mucho que te Quiero; Los Tigres del Norte – La Garra De...	
1995	Vikki Carr	Recuerdo a Javier Solís	Ramón Ayala and Los Bravos del Norte – Dime Cuando Volverás; Vicente Fernández – Recordando a Los Panchos; La Diferenzia – La Diferenzia; Pedro Fernández – Mi Forma de Sentir; Los Terribles del Norte – El Bronco; Selena – Amor Prohibido	
1996	Flaco Jiménez	Flaco Jiménez	Ramón Ayala y Sus Bravos del Norte – Lágrimas; Juan Gabriel – El México Que Se Nos Fue; Jaime y los Chamacos – ...No Se Cansan!; La Mafia – Éxitos En Vivo	
1997	La Mafia	Un Millón de Rosas	Ramón Ayala y sus Bravos del Norte – Arráncame el Corazón; Fandango USA – 10th Anniversary; Vicente Fernández – Vicente Fernández y sus Canciones; Jaime y los Chamacos – En Vivo... Puro Party Live!	
1998	La Mafia	En Tus Manos	Ramón Ayala y sus Bravos del Norte – En las Alas de un Ángel/Despedimos a Cornelio Reyna; Alejandro Fernández – Muy Dentro de Mi Corazón; José & Durval – Al Sur de La Frontera; Pedro Fernández – Un Mundo Raro; Lizza Lamb – Destino; Los Tigres del Norte – Jefe de Jefes	
1999	Los Super Seven	Los Super Seven	Ramón Ayala y sus Bravos del Norte – Casas de Madera; Vicente Fernández – Entre el Amor y Yo; La Mafia – Euforia; Los Terribles del Norte – Colgado de Un Árbol	
2000	Plácido Domingo	100 Años de Mariachi	Pepe Aguilar – Por el Amor de Siempre; Alejandro Fernández – Mi Verdad; Vicente Fernández – Vicente Fernández y los Más Grandes Éxitos de Los Dandys; Julio Preciado – Que Puedo Hacer Por Ti; La Mafia – Momentos	
2001	Pepe Aguilar	Por Una Mujer Bonita	Ramón Ayala y Sus Bravos del Norte – Quémame Los Ojos; Julio Preciado – Como Este Loco; Vicente Fernández – Lobo Herido; Grupo Atrapado – Atrapando Tu Corazón; Los Terribles del Norte – Décimo Aniversario	
2002	Ramón Ayala y sus Bravos del Norte	En Vivo... El Hombre y su Música	Pepe Aguilar – Lo Mejor de Nosotros; Vicente Fernández – Más con el Número Uno; Grupo Atrapado – Muévete, Muévete Más; La Mafia – Contigo; Los Terribles del Norte – Sangre Caliente	
2003	Joan Sebastian	Lo Dijo el Corazón	Banda el Recodo de Don Cruz Lizárraga – No Me Sé Rajar; Intocable – Sueños; Julio Preciado – Arriba mi Sinaloa; Jennifer Peña – Libre; Los Tucanes de Tijuana – Jugo a la Vida	
2004	Joan Sebastian	Afortunado	Bronco El Gigante de América – Siempre Arriba; Intocable – Nuestro Destino Estaba Escrito; Los Tigres del Norte – La Reina del Sur; Los Tucanes de Tijuana – Imperio	
2005	Intocable	Intimamente	Ramón Ayala y sus Bravos del Norte – Títere en Tus Manos; Banda El Recodo de Don Cruz Lizárraga – Por Tí; Rocío Dúrcal – Alma Ranchera; Los Temerarios – Veintisiete	
2006	Luis Miguel	México en la Piel	Ramón Ayala y sus Bravos del Norte – Ya No Llores; Mariachi Los Camperos de Nati Cano – ¡Llegaron Los Camperos!: Concert Favorites; Intocable – X; Las 3 Divas – Las 3 Divas	
2007	Pepe Aguilar	Historias de Mi Tierra	Ana Bárbara – No Es Brujería; Mariachi Sol de México – 25 Aniversario; Pablo Montero – A Toda Ley; Julio Preciado – Mi Tributo a Juan Gabriel; Alicia Villarreal – Orgullo de Mujer	
2008	Pepe Aguilar	100% Mexicano	Cristian Castro – El Indomable; Vicente Fernández – Para Siempre; Paquita la del Barrio – Puro Dolor; Sones de México Ensemble Chicago – Esta Tierra es Tuya (This Land is Your Land)	

== See also ==
- Grammy Award for Best Banda Album
- Grammy Award for Best Regional Mexican Music Album (including Tejano)
- Grammy Award for Best Tejano Album
- List of Grammy Award categories
- Regional styles of Mexican music
