= A Todo Color =

A Todo Color (In Living Color)

Studio album by La Mafia
- Released: February 7, 1987
- Genre: Tejano · Grupero · Rock · Latin pop · Latin ballad · dance-pop · Tropical · Salsa · Cumbia · Norteño
- Label: CBS Records
- Producer: Juan Carlos Calderón

La Mafia chronology
La Mafia 1986 (1986)	A Todo Color (In Living Color) (1987)	Homenaje a Nelson Ned & Roberto Carlos (1988)

A Todo Color (In Living Color) is the eleventh studio album by La Mafia released on February 7, 1987. The album entered at number twenty-three on the Latin regional Billboard charts and reached number eight by March. On September 15, 2017 a re-mastered version of the album was released in digital form.

== Track listing ==
No.	Title	Writer(s)	Length
1.	"Tengo un Amor"	Juan Carlos Calderón
2.	"Fire in Your Eyes"	José María Cano
3.	"Hoy Conoci un Amor"	Juan Carlos Calderón
4.	"No, No, No"	Nacho Cano
5.	"Historia de un Amor"	Carlos E. Almarán
6.	"Comprende"	Juan Carlos Calderón
7.	"Hoy Me Pongo a Llorar"	José María Cano
8.	"Limite"	Nacho Cano
9.	"Intimo Momento"	Juan Carlos Calderón
10.	"Rags to Riches"	Juan Carlos Calderón

== Personnel ==
- Vocal: Oscar De La Rosa
- Accordion, keyboards and producer: Armando Lichtenberger Jr.
- Keyboards and vocal: David De La Garza III
- Bass guitar: Rudy Martinez
- Drums: Alan Lopez
- Guitar: Viktor Pacheko
- Bajo sexto, percussion and conga: Robbie Longoria
- Arrangements on "Hoy Conoci un Amor", "Tengo un Amor", "Comprende" and "Intimo Momento" by Juan Carlos Calderón
- Arrangements on "Comprende", "Hoy Conoci un Amor" and "Tengo un Amor" by K.C. Porter
- Arrangements on "Tengo un Amor" and "Rags to Riches" by Randy Kerber
- Arrangements on "Fire in Your Eyes" and "Hoy Me Pongo a Llorar" by José María Cano
- Arrangements on "No, No, No" and "Limite" by Nacho Cano
- Producer: Juan Carlos Calderón
- Piano: Randy Kerber
- Keyboards: Randy Kerber, Juan Carlos Calderón, José María Cano, Nacho Cano and K.C. Porter
- Guitar solos (track 5): Stanley Jordan
