= Nube Pasajera =

Studio album by La Mafia
- Released: September 21, 2004
- Genre: Tejano
- Label: Fonovisa
- Producer: Armando Lichtenberger Jr.

La Mafia chronology
| Inconfundible (2001) | Nube Pasajera (2004) | Para El Pueblo (2004) |

Nube Pasajera (Passing Cloud) is the twenty-fifth studio album by La Mafia. It was released on September 21, 2004. A song titled "No Se Por Que" was to have been the first song on the album, but was not included when the album was released.

== Track listing ==
| No. | Title | Length |
|---|---|---|
| 1. | "Alejate" | 3:27 |
| 2. | "Nube Pasajera" | 3:24 |
| 3. | "Lloro El Pasado" | 3:13 |
| 4. | "Las Llaves de Mi Alma" | 3:22 |
| 5. | "Llore Por Dentro" | 3:00 |
| 6. | "No Te Vayas Jamas" | 3:04 |
| 7. | "De Que Valio Querete" | 3:11 |
| 8. | "Chiquilla" | 3:46 |
| 9. | "Te Estoy Amando Tanto" | 3:30 |
| 10. | "Nube Pasajera (Pop Version)" | 3:36 |
| 11. | "Nube Pasajera (Cumbia Version)" | 2:36 |
