= Eternamente Romanticos =

Studio album by La Mafia
- Released: August 12, 2008
- Genre: Tejano · Grupero · Rock · Latin pop · Latin ballad · dance-pop · Tropical · Salsa · Cumbia · Norteño
- Label: Disa Records
- Producer: Áureo Baqueiro · Nigel Walker · Kike Santander · Joan Sebastian · Roberto Livi

La Mafia chronology
Para El Pueblo (2004)	Eternamente Romanticos (2008)	Amor y Sexo (2014)

Eternamente Romanticos is the twenty-seventh studio album by La Mafia released on August 12, 2008. This would be the last studio album La Mafia released until 2014. The album was nominated for a Latin Grammy in 2009.

== Track listing ==
No.	Title	Writer(s)	Length
1.	"Eternamente"	Áureo Baqueiro	3:16
2.	"Ay Amor"	Kike Santander	3:07
3.	"El Mundo No Es Igual (Pop Version)"	Mario Domm, Samo	3:28
4.	"Sigo Siendo un Romantico"	Leonel García	3:41
5.	"Amame"	Gian Marco	3:07
6.	"Sobrevivi"	Hanna Nicole, Ashley Grace	3:19
7.	"Me Rompes El Corazon"	Alberto Espinoza, José Antonio Dabdoub, Ángel Yáñez, José Carlos Fausto Monroy	3:26
8.	"El Mundo No Es Igual"	Mario Domm, Samo	2:54
9.	"Eternamente (Balada)"	Áureo Baqueiro	3:25
10.	"Es El Destino"	Noel Schajris	3:18
11.	"Sirvame Otra"	Reyli Barba	3:28
12.	"Aleluya (Hallelujah)"	Leonard Cohen, Leonel García, Roberto Livi	3:21
13.	"Debo Hacerlo"	Juan Gabriel	4:54
14.	"Alguien Soy Yo"	Joan Sebastian, Xavier San Martín, Pablo Benegas, Álvaro Fuentes, Haritz Garde	3:59
15.	"Me Hace Bien, Me Hace Mal"	Ángel Baillo, Jorge Corrales, Servando Yañez	3:25
16.	"Dime Donde y Cuando"	Áureo Baqueiro	3:25

== Personnel ==
- Oscar De La Rosa — Vocalist
- Armando Lichtenberger Jr. — Accordion, Keyboards, Producer
- David De La Garza III — Keyboards, Vocals
- Rudy Martinez — Bass Guitar
- Alan Lopez — Drums
- Viktor Pacheko — Guitar
- Robbie Longoria — Bajo Sexto, Percussions, Congas
- Áureo Baqueiro — Guitar, Piano, Keyboard
- Carmen Santonja — Guitar
- Robbie Kondor — Keyboard
- Kike Santander — Guitar, Piano, Keyboard
- Mario Domm — Guitar, Piano
- Samo — Keyboard
- Leonel García — Guitar
- Gian Marco — Guitar, Piano
- Hanna Nicole — Guitar, Piano
- Ashley Grace — Guitar, Piano
- Alberto Espinoza — Bass
- José Antonio Dabdoub — Guitar
- Ángel Yañez — Guitar
- José Carlos Fausto Monroy — Drum
- Noel Schajris — Guitar, Piano
- Reyli Barba — Piano
- Roberto Livi — Piano And Keyboard
- Joan Sebastian — Guitar
- Xavier San Martín — Keyboard
- Pablo Benegas — Guitar
- Álvaro Fuentes — Bass
- Haritz Garde — Drum
- Ángel Baillo — Bass
- Jorge Corrales — Piano, Keyboard
- Servando Yañez — Drum
- Robbie Kondor, Áureo Baqueiro, Kike Santander, Samo, Roberto Livi, Xavier San Martín and Jorge Corrales — Keyboards
- Áureo Baqueiro — Producer
- Kike Santander — Producer
- Mario Domm — Producer
- Samo — Producer
- Leonel García — Producer
- Gian Marco — Producer
- Hanna Nicole — Producer
- Ashley Grace — Producer
- Alberto Espinoza — Producer
- José Antonio Dabdoub — Producer
- Ángel Yañez — Producer
- José Carlos Fausto Monroy — Producer
- Noel Schajris — Producer
- Reyli Barba — Producer
- Roberto Livi — Producer
- Joan Sebastian — Producer
- Xavier San Martín — Producer
- Pablo Benegas — Producer
- Álvaro Fuentes — Producer
- Haritz Garde — Producer
- Ángel Baillo — Producer
- Jorge Corrales — Producer
- Servando Yañez — Producer
- The Philadelphia Orchestra — Orchestral (Track 12, 13 And 14)
