= Inconfundible =

Inconfundible may refer to:

- Inconfundible (Víctor Manuelle album), 1999 album
- Inconfundible (La Mafia album), 2001 album
