= Con Amor =

Con Amor (Spanish "with love") may refer to:

== Music ==
=== Albums ===
- Con Amor, album by Tito Rojas
- Con Amor, album by Los Yonic's 1984
- Con Amor, album by Richard Clayderman 2000
- Con Amor, album by Carlos Greco / Matt Monro 2007
- Con Amor: Tus Exitos Favoritos, Menudo 1984
- Con Amor Eterno Pandora (band) 1991
- Con Amor, album by Alberto Vazquez (singer)
- Con Amor, album by Los Terricolas 2008
- Con Amor, album by Chucho Avellanet 1993
- Con Tu Amor (album) Juan Gabriel 1992
- Con Tanto Amor La Mafia 1990

=== Songs ===
- "Con Amor" by Ricardo Montaner Composed by Ricardo Montaner
- "Con Amor", song by John Du Prez Jaymes, Du Prez 1983
- "Con Amor" by Los Bukis Composed by Marco Antonio Solís
