= Contigo =

Contigo (With you in Spanish and Portuguese) may refer to:

== Music ==
- Contigo (album), by La Mafia, or the title song, 2000
- "Contigo" (song), by Karol G and Tiësto, 2024
- "Contigo", a song by BoyWithUke from Serotonin Dreams, 2022
- "Contigo", a song by Inna from Yo, 2019
- "Contigo", a song by Joaquín Sabina, 1996
- "Contigo (Estar Contigo)", a song by Luis Miguel from Romances, 1997

== Other uses ==
- Contigo (political party), a 2019–2021 political party in Peru
- Contigo, a strategy board game in the 3M bookshelf game series
- Contigo, a brand of water bottles owned by Newell Brands
