= Enter the Future =

Studio album by La Mafia
- Released: March 4, 1990
- Genre: Tejano · Grupero · Rock · Latin pop · Latin ballad · dance-pop · Tropical · Salsa · Cumbia · Norteño
- Label: CBS Records
- Producer: Juan Carlos Calderón

La Mafia chronology
Xplosiv (1989)	Enter the Future (1990)	Con Tanto Amor (1990)

Enter the Future is the fourteenth studio album by La Mafia, released on March 4, 1990. It entered at number seven on the Latin regional Billboard charts and by July it reached number four. In July 2017 it was announced that a re-mastered version of the album will be available in digital platform on August 4, 2017.

== Track listing ==
No.	Title	Music	Length
1.	"Soy Tuyo"	Juan Carlos Calderón
2.	"Cariñito Ven"	Juan Carlos Calderón
3.	"Lagrimas de Mi Barrio"	José María Cano
4.	"Mis Locuras"	Juan Carlos Calderón
5.	"Mujer Linda"	Nacho Cano
6.	"Tan Enamorados"	Gianni Togni, Guido Morra, Ricardo Montaner
7.	"Quisiera Ser Como Tu"	Juan Carlos Calderón
8.	"Quiero"	Nacho Cano
9.	"Óyeme"	José María Cano
10.	"No Sabes Tu (Lo Que Es)"	Juan Carlos Calderón
11.	"A Donde Vas"	Juan Carlos Calderón
12.	"Amor de Navidad"	Juan Carlos Calderón

== Personnel ==
- Oscar De La Rosa — Vocal
- Armando Lichtenberger Jr. — Accordion, Keyboards And Producer
- David De La Garza III — Keyboards And Vocals
- Rudy Martinez — Bass guitar
- Alan Lopez — Drums
- Viktor Pacheko — Guitar
- Robbie Longoria — Bajo Sexto, Percussion And Conga
- Juan Carlos Calderón — Piano And Synthesizers
- K.C. Porter — Piano And Synthesizers
- Randy Kerber — Piano And Synthesizers
- José María Cano — Piano And Synthesizers
- Nacho Cano — Piano And Synthesizers
- Randy Kerber, Juan Carlos Calderón, José María Cano, Nacho Cano and K.C. Porter — Keyboards
- Juan Carlos Calderón — Producer
- José María Cano — Producer
- Nacho Cano — Producer
- Agboola Shadare — Guitar (Track 6)
