= Me Haces Falta (disambiguation) =

"Me Haces Falta" is a 2007 song by Jennifer Lopez

Me Haces Falta may also refer to:

- "Me haces falta", song by Mexican group Yndio
- "Me haces falta", song by Grupo Pegasso
- "Me haces falta", song by La Mafia from Inconfundible
- "Me haces falta", song by Grupo Bryndis from Memorias
- "Me haces falta", song by Ana Gabriel from Soy como soy
- "Me Haces Falta", the Spanish version of "I Need You" by Marc Anthony

== See also ==
- "Tú Me Haces Falta", song by Eddie Santiago 1989
