= Estas Tocando Fuego =

Studio album by La Mafia
- Released: October 19, 1991
- Genre: Tejano
- Label: Sony
- Producer: Armando Lichtenberger Jr.

La Mafia chronology
Homenaje a Javier Solís (1991)	Estas Tocando Fuego (1991)	Ahora y Siempre (1992)

Estas Tocando Fuego (You're Touching Fire) is the sixteenth studio album by La Mafia. It was released on October 19, 1991. The album entered the Billboard Latin Regional Mexican chart at number sixteen. By March 21, 1992, it reached the number one position and stayed in that position for twenty-three weeks. Estas Tocando Fuego became a phenomenal hit surpassing sales expectations every where. The record went on to become the first ever million selling album in the history of tejano music. The band's outstanding performance prompted Sony to present them with the prestigious Premio Cristal, created by the label to honor artist who attain worldwide sales in excess of 500,000 units for a single album. The album was certified triple platinum, and La Mafia earned Billboard and Premio Lo Nuestro band of the year. The album tied with Selena's Entre a Mi Mundo for best regional Mexican album of the year at Premio Lo Nuestro 1993.

== Track listing ==
No.	Title	Length
1.	"Mi Llamada"	3:31
2.	"Nuestra Cancion"	3:24
3.	"Una Memoria"	2:56
4.	"Aqui Esta Mi Amor"	3:45
5.	"Olvidame"	3:09
6.	"Estas Tocando Fuego"	3:12
7.	"Como Me Duele Amor"	3:10
8.	"Quiero Volver Contigo"	2:57
9.	"Yo Te Amare"	2:31
10.	"Yo Me Morire"	3:01
11.	"Si Tu Me Quisieras"	3:13
12.	"Mas Que Solo Amiga"	2:52

== Charts ==
Chart (1991-1993)	Peak position
US Top Latin Albums (Billboard)	30
US Regional Mexican Albums (Billboard)	1

== Certifications ==
Region	Certification	Certified units/sales
United States (RIAA)	Diamond (Latin)	600,000^{‡}
^{‡} Sales+streaming figures based on certification alone.
