= Ahora y Siempre (La Mafia album) =

Studio album by La Mafia
- Released: December 12, 1992
- Genre: Tejano
- Label: Sony
- Producer: Armando Lichtenberger Jr.

La Mafia chronology
Estas Tocando Fuego (1991)	Ahora y Siempre (1992)	Vida (1994)

Ahora y Siempre (Now and Forever) is the seventeenth studio album by La Mafia. It was released on December 12, 1992. The album entered the billboard charts at number twelve. And reached number one for six weeks.

== Track listing ==
No.	Title	Length
1.	"Que Hare Yo"	3:57
2.	"No Me Pidas Mas"	3:50
3.	"A Pesar de Ti"	3:34
4.	"No Soy El Mismo"	3:39
5.	"Donde El Viento Me Lleve"	3:15
6.	"Ahora y Siempre"	3:07
7.	"Gracias"	4:00
8.	"Muero Sin Ti"	3:14
9.	"El Amor"	3:52
10.	"Dile"	3:30
11.	"Me Estoy Enamorando"	3:36
12.	"Ay Amiga Me Voy"	3:23

== Charts ==
Chart (1992-1993)	Peak position
US Top Latin Albums (Billboard)	5
US Regional Mexican Albums (Billboard)	1

== Certifications ==
Region	Certification	Certified units/sales
United States (RIAA)	Diamond (Latin)	600,000^{‡}
^{‡} Sales+streaming figures based on certification alone.
