= Gary Keller =

Gary Keller may refer to:

- Gary Keller (basketball), American basketball player
- Gary Keller (saxophonist), American jazz and classical saxophonist
- Gary W. Keller, realtor and author
