= Un Millón de Rosas =

Studio album by La Mafia
- Released: January 30, 1996
- Genre: Tejano
- Length: 39:49
- Label: Sony
- Producer: Armando Lichtenberger Jr.

La Mafia chronology
Vida (1994)	Un Millón de Rosas (1996)	En Tus Manos (1997)

Un Millón de Rosas (A Million Roses) is the nineteenth studio album released by American band La Mafia. It was released on January 30, 1996, by Sony Music Entertainment. The album peaked at number one in the Billboard Regional Mexican Albums chart and also reached top ten in the Billboard Top Latin Songs chart. Un Millón de Rosas earned them the Grammy Award for Best Mexican/Mexican-American Album at the 39th Grammy Awards. At the 9th Lo Nuestro Awards, it received a nomination for Regional Mexican Album of the Year.

== Track listing ==
No.	Title	Length
1.	"Yo Te Amare"	3:46
2.	"Amame"	3:55
3.	"Mejores Que Ella" (featuring Marc Anthony)	4:29
4.	"Quién"	3:33
5.	"Vente"	4:09
6.	"Un Millón de Rosas"	3:29
7.	"Para No Volver"	3:28
8.	"Un Suspiro"	2:58
9.	"Te Deseo lo Mejor"	3:14
10.	"Cómo Pude Estar Tan Ciego"	2:50
11.	"Ven y Canta"	3:58

== Chart performance ==
Chart (1996)	Peak position
US Billboard Top Latin Albums	2
US Billboard Regional Mexican Albums	2

== Certifications ==
Region	Certification	Certified units/sales
United States (RIAA)	4× Platinum (Latin)	240,000^{‡}
^{‡} Sales+streaming figures based on certification alone.
