= Xplosiv (album) =

Studio album by La Mafia
- Released: February 11, 1989
- Genre: Tejano · Grupero · Rock · Latin pop · Latin ballad · dance-pop · Tropical · Salsa · Cumbia · Norteño
- Label: CBS Records
- Producer: Juan Carlos Calderón

La Mafia chronology
Amame (1988)	Xplosiv (1989)	Enter The Future (1990)

Xplosiv is the thirteenth studio album by La Mafia. It was released on February 11, 1989. The album entered the Billboard Latin Regional chart at number 16 and reached a peak position of number 4 by March 1989.

== Track listing ==
No.	Title	Writer(s)	Length
1.	"Por Que"	Juan Carlos Calderón	3:42
2.	"Me Estoy Volviendo Loco"	Juan Carlos Calderón	3:03
3.	"Time For Love"	José María Cano	3:18
4.	"Antes de Mi"	Juan Carlos Calderón	3:36
5.	"Ya Me Canse"	Nacho Cano	3:09
6.	"Tiempo Para Vívir ((I've Had) The Time of My Life)" (featuring Lucero)	John DeNicola, Donald Markowitz, Franke Previte, Juan Carlos Calderón	4:49
7.	"Un Million de Besos"	Juan Carlos Calderón	3:13
8.	"Quiereme"	José María Cano	3:30
9.	"Si Quiere Dios"	Nacho Cano	3:47
10.	"Un Ratito de Pasion"	Juan Carlos Calderón	3:04
11.	"Te Acordaras de Mi"	Juan Carlos Calderón	3:18
12.	"Me Cai de la Nube" (featuring Cornelio Reyna)	Cornelio Reyna	3:36

== Personnel ==
- Oscar De La Rosa — Vocal
- Armando Lichtenberger Jr. — Accordion, Keyboards And Producer
- David De La Garza III — Keyboards And Vocal
- Rudy Martinez — Bass guitar
- Alan Lopez — Drums
- Viktor Pacheko — Guitar
- Robbie Longoria — Bajo Sexto, Percussions And Conga
- Juan Carlos Calderón — Piano And Synthesizers
- K.C. Porter — Piano And Synthesizers
- Randy Kerber — Piano And Synthesizers
- José María Cano — Piano And Synthesizers
- Nacho Cano — Piano And Synthesizers
- Randy Kerber, Juan Carlos Calderón, José María Cano, Nacho Cano and K.C. Porter — Keyboards
- Juan Carlos Calderón — Producer
- José María Cano — Producer
- Nacho Cano — Producer
- Lucero — Vocal
- Cornelio Reyna — Vocal
- Joel Peskin — Saxophone, Soprano Saxophone, Alto Saxophone And Tenor Saxophone (Track 6)
