= En Tus Manos (album) =

Studio album by La Mafia
- Released: June 3, 1997
- Genre: Tejano
- Length: 36:34
- Label: Sony
- Producer: Armando Lichtenberger Jr.

La Mafia chronology
| Un Millón de Rosas (1996) | En Tus Manos (1997) | Euforia (1998) |

En Tus Manos (In Your Hands) is the twentieth studio album by La Mafia. It was released on June 3, 1997. The album peaked at number four in the Billboard Regional Mexican Albums chart and also reached top ten in the Billboard Top Latin Albums chart. En Tus Manos earned them the Grammy Award for Best Mexican-American Performance at the 40th Grammy Awards.

== Track listing ==
| No. | Title | Length |
|---|---|---|
| 1. | "Amiga Cruel" | 3:16 |
| 2. | "Canciones de Cornelio (Medley/Potpourri Te Vas Angel Mio/Que Se Junten Nuestros Brazos/Idos de la Mente)" | 4:32 |
| 3. | "En Tus Manos" | 3:50 |
| 4. | "Vivir" | 3:40 |
| 5. | "Solo" | 3:45 |
| 6. | "Para Siempre Contigo" | 3:48 |
| 7. | "Dime" | 3:05 |
| 8. | "Vuelve Conmigo" | 3:16 |
| 9. | "Que Haria Sin Ti" | 3:41 |
| 10. | "Enamorada" | 3:33 |

== Chart performance ==
| Chart (1997) | Peak position |
|---|---|
| US Billboard Top Latin Albums | 8 |
| US Billboard Regional Mexican Albums | 4 |

== Certifications ==
| Region | Certification | Certified units/sales |
|---|---|---|
| United States (RIAA) | 2× Platinum (Latin) | 120,000^{‡} |
^{‡} Sales+streaming figures based on certification alone.
