= Para El Pueblo =

Studio album by La Mafia
- Released: November 16, 2004
- Genre: Tejano · Grupero · Rock · Latin pop · Latin ballad · dance-pop · Tropical · Salsa · Cumbia · Norteño
- Label: Urbana Records
- Producer: Áureo Baqueiro · Kike Santander · Nigel Walker · Roberto Livi

La Mafia chronology
Nube Pasajera (2004)	Para El Pueblo (2004)	Eternamente Romanticos (2008)

Para El Pueblo (For the People) is the twenty-sixth studio album by La Mafia released on November 16, 2004.

== Track listing ==
No.	Title	Writer(s)	Length
1.	"Para El Pueblo"	Kike Santander	3:09
2.	"Dejame"	Leonel García	3:38
3.	"Matame Con Tu Veneno"	Noel Schajris	3:19
4.	"Arrancame El Corazon"	Gian Marco	3:00
5.	"Convencerte"	Áureo Baqueiro	3:42
6.	"Sufriendo El Corazon"	Xavier San Martín, Pablo Benegas, Álvaro Fuentes, Haritz Garde	3:36
7.	"A Mí Manera (My Way)"	Jacques Revaux, Claude François, Gilles Thibaut, Paul Anka, Leonel García, Roberto Livi	4:28
8.	"¿Ahora Quién?"	Estéfano, Julio C. Reyes	5:05
9.	"Yo Se Que Te Iras"	Juan Gabriel	3:41
10.	"Tienes Razón"	Reyli Barba	3:30
11.	"Nadie Como Tu"	Kike Santander	3:29
12.	"De Norte a Sur"	Áureo Baqueiro	3:23
13.	"Sufriendo El Corazon (Cumbia Version)"	Xavier San Martín, Pablo Benegas, Álvaro Fuentes, Haritz Garde	3:38
14.	"Tienes Razón (Balada)"	Reyli Barba	2:59
15.	"Para El Pueblo (Urbana Mix)"	Kike Santander	3:35
16.	"Tienes Razón (Instrumental)"	Reyli Barba	3:30
17.	"Sufriendo El Corazon (Instrumental)"	Xavier San Martín, Pablo Benegas, Álvaro Fuentes, Haritz Garde	3:38
18.	"Para El Pueblo (Instrumental)"	Kike Santander	3:07
