= Hot Stuff (La Mafia album) =

Studio album by La Mafia
- Released: August 24, 1984
- Genre: Tejano
- Label: Cara Records

La Mafia chronology
Mafia Mania (1983)	Hot Stuff (1984)	Neon Static (1985)

Hot Stuff is the seventh studio album by La Mafia released on August 24, 1984. It entered at number twenty-five on the Billboard Latin Regional chart.

== Track listing ==
No.	Title	Length
1.	"Mi Loca Pasion"
2.	"Historia de una Paloma"
3.	"Sonrie una Vez Mas"
4.	"Ay Que Dolor"
5.	"Si Deveras Me Quieres"
6.	"Hot Stuff (Breaker)"
7.	"Devolucion"
8.	"Dejame Ser Parte de Tu Vida"
9.	"Olvidame"
10.	"Te Voy a Complacer"
