= ...Es La Diferencia =

Studio album by Vicente Fernández
- Released: 1982
- Recorded: 1980
- Genre: Mariachi
- Length: 32:46
- Language: Spanish
- Label: CBS

Vicente Fernández chronology
Valses del Recuerdo (1981)	...Es La Diferencia (1982)	15 Grandes con El Número Uno (1983)

...Es La Diferencia (...That's the Difference) is a studio album released by Mexican mariachi singer Vicente Fernández in 1982. The album received a nomination for a Grammy Award for Best Mexican-American Performance.

== Track listing ==
No.	Title	Writer(s)	Length
1.	"María María"	Federico Méndez	2:56
2.	"Tenías Razón"	Tirzo Paiz	2:28
3.	"Dolor"	Chucho Monge	3:04
4.	"Qué Bonita, Qué Bonita"	Manuel Monterrosas	2:56
5.	"La Diferencia"	Juan Gabriel	2:47
6.	"Y Tú Me Vas a Recordar"	Méndez	2:57
7.	"Sin Que Lo Sepas Tú"	Marco Antonio Vázquez	2:59
8.	"La Refinera"	Salvador Velázquez	3:30
9.	"No Debió Volver"	Raúl Sánchez	3:13
10.	"Yo Quiero Ser Tu Marido"	José Aguilar Ochoa	2:38
11.	"Nomas Dejé de Quererte"	Vicente Fernández	2:28

Notes

- Credits adapted from AllMusic.
