= En Vivo... El Hombre y su Música =

Live album by Ramón Ayala
- Released: July 24, 2001
- Label: Freddie Records

Ramón Ayala chronology
Nadie Sabe (2001)	En Vivo... El Hombre y su Música (2001)	Calandria (2002)

En Vivo... El Hombre y su Música is an album by Ramón Ayala and his band Los Bravos del Norte, released on July 24, 2001, through the record label Freddie Records. In 2002, the album earned Ayala a Grammy Award for Best Mexican/Mexican-American Album.

== Track listing ==
1. Introduction
2. La Vecina Me Puso el Dedo
3. Tragos Amargos
4. Chaparra de Mi Amor
5. Mi Golondrina
6. Mi Piquito de Oro
7. La Rama del Mesquite
8. Entierrenme Cantando
9. Gaviota
10. Solo una Patada
11. Rinconcito en el Cielo
12. Atras de la Raya
13. Donde Estas
14. Alma Gemela

== Chart performance ==
Chart (2001)	Peak position
US Billboard Top Latin Albums	13
US Billboard Regional Mexican Albums	3

== Sales and certifications ==
Region	Certification	Certified units/sales
United States (RIAA)	2× Platinum (Latin)	200,000^{^}
^{^} Shipments figures based on certification alone.
