= Éxitos En Vivo (La Mafia album) =

Live album by La Mafia
- Released: February 28, 1995
- Genre: Pop Latino, Tejano
- Length: 47:23
- Label: Sony Music Latin

La Mafia chronology
Vida (1994)	Éxitos En Vivo (1995)	Un Millón de Rosas (1996)

Éxitos En Vivo (English: Hits Live) is the title of a live album released by Tejano music group La Mafia from Monterrey Nuevo León Mexico on February 28, 1995. This album became their first number-one set on the Billboard Top Latin Albums chart. It received a nomination for a Grammy Award for Best Mexican/Mexican-American Album.

== Track listing ==
Source: Billboard.

No.	Title	Writer(s)	Length
1.	"Introducción"		0:46
2.	"Nadie"	Armando Larrinaga	3:43
3.	"Toma Mi Amor"	Larrinaga	3:34
4.	"Ahora y Siempre"	Ricardo Quijano	4:13
5.	"Mi Llamada"	Homero Rodríguez	3:38
6.	"Estás Tocando Fuego"	Jorge Luis Piloto	3:43
7.	"Donde el Viento Me Lleve"	E. J. Ledesma	2:17
8.	"Si Tu Me Quisieras"	Juan Carlos Pérez	1:53
9.	"Yo Me Moriré"	Pérez	3:17
10.	"Cambiando la Historia"	Homero Rodríguez	3:25
11.	"Me Estoy Enamorando"	Larrinaga	4:25
12.	"Como Me Duele Amor"	Quijano	2:26
13.	"Nuestra Canción"	Quijano	2:15
14.	"Me Duele Estar Solo" (Dance Mix)	Luis Gerardo Padilla	3:51
15.	"Let it Be"	John Lennon, Paul McCartney	3:57

== Chart performance ==
Chart (1995)	Peak position
US Billboard Top Latin Albums	1
US Billboard Regional Mexican Albums	5
US Billboard Latin Pop Albums	5
US Billboard Top Heatseekers	26

== See also ==
- List of number-one Billboard Top Latin Albums from the 1990s
- List of number-one Billboard Latin Pop Albums from the 1990s
