= An Evening with George Shearing & Mel Tormé =

Live album by Mel Tormé
- Released: 1982
- Recorded: April 15, 1982
- Genre: Vocal jazz, Jazz
- Length: 38:41
- Label: Concord
- Producer: Carl Jefferson

Mel Tormé chronology
Encore at Marty's (1982)	An Evening with George Shearing & Mel Tormé (1982)	The Classic Concert Live (1982)

Professional ratings
Review scores
Source	Rating
AllMusic	4.5/5 stars
The Rolling Stone Jazz Record Guide	3/5 stars
The Penguin Guide to Jazz Recordings	3/4 stars

An Evening with George Shearing & Mel Tormé is a live album by Mel Tormé, accompanied by George Shearing.

It was the first of six albums that Tormé and Shearing recorded together for Concord Records, and Tormé's performance on this album won him the Grammy Award for Best Jazz Vocal Performance, Male at the 25th Grammy Awards.

== Track listing ==
1. "All God's Chillun Got Rhythm" (Walter Jurmann, Gus Kahn, Bronisław Kaper) – 3:37
2. "Born to Be Blue" (Mel Tormé, Bob Wells) – 5:15
3. "Give Me the Simple Life" (Rube Bloom, Harry Ruby) – 3:39
4. "Good Morning Heartache" (Dan Fisher, Ervin Drake, Irene Higginbotham) – 6:10
5. "Manhattan Hoedown" (Brian Torff) – 4:46
6. "You'd Be So Nice to Come Home To" (Cole Porter) – 2:52
7. "A Nightingale Sang in Berkeley Square" (Eric Maschwitz, Manning Sherwin) – 5:02
8. "Love" (Ralph Blane, Hugh Martin) – 4:55
9. "It Might as Well Be Spring" (Oscar Hammerstein II, Richard Rodgers) – 4:42
10. "Lullaby of Birdland" (George Shearing, George David Weiss) – 7:32

== Personnel ==
- Mel Tormé – vocals
- George Shearing – piano
- Brian Torff – double bass
