= 26th Annual Grammy Awards =

1984 US music awards ceremony

- Date: February 28, 1984
- Location: Shrine Auditorium, Los Angeles
- Hosted by: John Denver

Highlights
- Most awards: Michael Jackson (8)
- Most nominations: Michael Jackson (12)

Television/radio coverage
- Network: CBS
- Viewership: 51.67 million viewers (record)

The 26th Annual Grammy Awards were held on February 28, 1984, at Shrine Auditorium, Los Angeles, and were broadcast live on American television. They recognized accomplishments by musicians from the year 1983. Michael Jackson, who had been recovering from scalp burns sustained due to an accident that occurred during the filming of a Pepsi commercial, won a record eight awards during the show. It is notable for garnering the largest Grammy Award television audience ever with 51.67 million viewers.

Michael Jackson received the most nominations ever in a single night with 12 and won 8 awards, breaking the record for most awards in a single night. Jackson won Album of the Year for Thriller and Record of the Year for "Beat It". The Police won Song of the Year for "Every Breath You Take" and Culture Club won for Best New Artist.

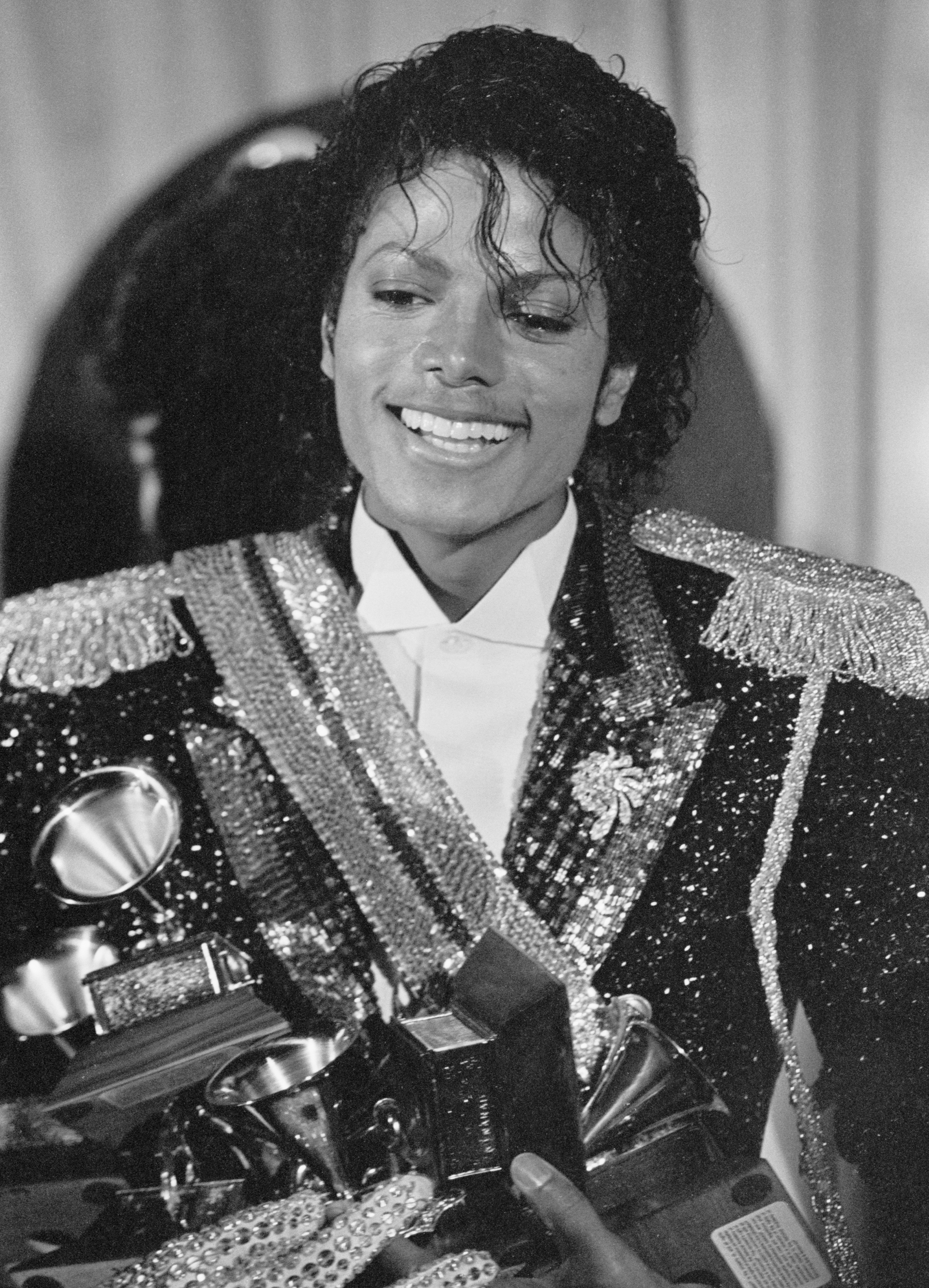
Jackson won eight awards, breaking the record for the most wins in a single night.

== Ratings ==
The 26th Grammy Awards had the highest ratings in the awarding body's history with 51.67 million viewers, a record unmatched as of 2026, and is the third most watched live awards show in U.S. television history (after the 1983 and 1998 editions of the Academy Awards). Donna Summer opened the show with "She Works Hard for the Money", and a tribute to working women.

== Performers ==
The awards telecast included the most performances of any Grammy show to date with sixteen, and also featured the first time all nominees in a single category (Best Female Pop Vocalist) performed the songs for which they were nominated.

Artist(s)	Song(s)
Donna Summer	"She Works Hard for the Money"
Big Country	"In a Big Country"
Bonnie Tyler	"Total Eclipse of the Heart"
Chuck Berry with George Thorogood & Stevie Ray Vaughan	"Maybellene" "Roll Over Beethoven"
Eurythmics	"Sweet Dreams (Are Made of This)"
Phil Driscoll	"Amazing Grace"
Albertina Walker	"Spread the Word"
Linda Ronstadt	"What's New?"
Walter Charles	"We Are What We Are" / "I Am What I Am" (from La Cage aux Folles)
Herbie Hancock	"Rockit"
The Oak Ridge Boys	"Love Song"
John Denver & a Muppet	Dialogue tune
Sheena Easton	"Telefone (Long Distance Love Affair)"
Wynton Marsallis with orchestra and quartet	"A Finale"
Irene Cara	"Flashdance... What a Feeling"

== Presenters ==
- Stevie Wonder & Bob Dylan - Song of the Year
- Alice Cooper & Grace Jones - Best Rock Performance with Duo or Group
- Joan Rivers & Culture Club - Explains the rules of the nominations
- Kim Carnes & Fee Waybill - Best Video Album
- Toto - Producer of the Year
- Cyndi Lauper & Rodney Dangerfield - Best New Artist
- Al Green - Best Gospel Performance Male and Female
- The Beach Boys - Album of the Year
- Mickey Rooney & Ann Miller - Best Cast Show Album
- James Ingram & Michael McDonald - Best R&B Instrumental Performance
- Anne Murray & Janie Frickie - Best Country Performance with Duo or Group
- Menudo - Best Recording for Children
- Christine McVie & Bob Seger - Best Pop Vocal Performance Female and Male
- Julio Iglesias & Melissa Manchester - Record of the Year

== Winners ==
=== General ===
Record of the Year

- "Beat It" – Michael Jackson
  - Quincy Jones (producer) & Michael Jackson (producer)
- "All Night Long (All Night)" - Lionel Richie
  - Lionel Richie & James Anthony Carmichael, producers
- "Every Breath You Take" - The Police
  - The Police & Hugh Padgham, producers
- "Flashdance... What a Feeling" - Irene Cara
  - Giorgio Moroder, producer
- "Maniac" - Michael Sembello
  - Phil Ramone & Michael Sembello, producers

Album of the Year

- Thriller – Michael Jackson
  - Quincy Jones (producer) & Michael Jackson (producer)
- Let's Dance - David Bowie
  - David Bowie & Nile Rodgers, producers
- An Innocent Man - Billy Joel
  - Phil Ramone, producer
- Synchronicity - The Police
  - The Police & Hugh Padgham, producers
- Flashdance: Original Soundtrack from the Motion Picture - Various Artists
  - Irene Cara, Shandi Sinnamon, Helen St. John, Karen Kamon, Joe Esposito, Laura Branigan, Donna Summer, Cycle V, Kim Carnes & Michael Sembello, featured artists; Giorgio Moroder, producer

Song of the Year

- "Every Breath You Take" – The Police
  - Sting (songwriter)
- "All Night Long (All Night)" - Lionel Richie
  - Lionel Richie (songwriter)
- "Beat It" - Michael Jackson
  - Michael Jackson (songwriter)
- "Billie Jean" - Michael Jackson
  - Michael Jackson (songwriter)
- "Maniac" - Michael Sembello
  - Michael Sembello & Dennis Matkosky (songwriters)

Best New Artist

- Culture Club
- Big Country
- Eurythmics
- Men Without Hats
- Musical Youth

=== Blues ===
- Best Traditional Blues Recording
  - Blues 'n Jazz – B.B. King

=== Children's ===
- Best Recording for Children Presented by Latin Group Menudo.
  - Quincy Jones (producer) & Michael Jackson for E.T. the Extra-Terrestrial

=== Classical ===
- Best Orchestral Recording
  - James Mallinson (producer), Georg Solti (conductor) & the Chicago Symphony Orchestra for Mahler: Symphony No. 9 in D
- Best Classical Vocal Soloist Performance
  - James Levine (conductor), Marilyn Horne, Leontyne Price & the Metropolitan Opera Orchestra for Leontyne Price & Marilyn Horne in Concert at the Met
- Best Opera Recording
  - Christopher Raeburn (producer), Georg Solti (conductor), Thomas Allen, Kiri Te Kanawa, Kurt Moll, Lucia Popp, Samuel Ramey, Frederica von Stade & the London Philharmonic for Mozart: Le Nozze di Figaro
  - Jay David Saks, Max Wilcox (producers), James Levine (conductor), Plácido Domingo, Cornell MacNeil, Teresa Stratas, & the Metropolitan Opera Orchestra for Verdi: La Traviata (Original Soundtrack)
- Best Choral Performance (other than opera)
  - Georg Solti (conductor), Margaret Hillis (choir director) & the Chicago Symphony Orchestra & Chorus for Haydn: The Creation
- Best Classical Performance - Instrumental Soloist or Soloists (with orchestra)
  - Raymond Leppard (conductor), Wynton Marsalis & the National Philharmonic Orchestra for Haydn: Trumpet Concerto in E Flat/L. Mozart: Trumpet Concerto In D/Hummel: Trumpet Concerto in E Flat
- Best Classical Performance - Instrumental Soloist or Soloists (without orchestra)
  - Glenn Gould for Beethoven: Piano Sonatas Nos. 12 & 13
- Best Chamber Music Performance
  - Mstislav Rostropovich and Rudolf Serkin for Brahms: Sonata for Cello and Piano in E Minor, Op. 38 and Sonata in F, Op. 99
- Best Classical Album
  - James Mallinson (producer), Georg Solti (conductor) & the Chicago Symphony Orchestra for Mahler: Symphony No. 9 in D

=== Comedy ===
- Best Comedy Recording
  - Eddie Murphy: Comedian – Eddie Murphy

=== Composing and arranging ===
- Best Instrumental Composition
  - Giorgio Moroder (composer) for "Love Theme From Flashdance" performed by various artists
- Best Album of Original Score Written for a Motion Picture or A Television Special
  - Michael Boddicker, Irene Cara, Kim Carnes, Douglas Cotler, Keith Forsey, Richard Gilbert, Jerry Hey, Duane Hitchings, Craig Krampf, Ronald Magness, Dennis Matkosky, Giorgio Moroder, Phil Ramone, Michael Sembello, Shandi Sinnamon (composers) for Flashdance performed by various artists
- Best Arrangement on an Instrumental
  - Dave Grusin (arranger) for "Summer Sketches '82"
- Best Instrumental Arrangement Accompanying Vocal(s)
  - Nelson Riddle (arranger) for "What's New" performed by Linda Ronstadt
- Best Vocal Arrangement for Two or More Voices
  - Arif Mardin & Chaka Khan (arrangers) for "Be Bop Medley" performed by Chaka Khan

=== Country ===
- Best Country Vocal Performance, Female
  - Anne Murray for "A Little Good News"
- Best Country Vocal Performance, Male
  - Lee Greenwood for "I.O.U."
- Best Country Performance by a Duo or Group with Vocal
  - Alabama for The Closer You Get...
- Best Country Instrumental Performance
  - New South for "Fireball"
- Best Country Song
  - Mike Reid (songwriter) for "Stranger in My House" performed by Ronnie Milsap

=== Folk ===
- Best Ethnic or Traditional Folk Recording
  - Clifton Chenier for I'm Here performed by Clifton Chenier & His Red Hot Louisiana Band

=== Gospel ===
- Best Gospel Performance, Female
  - Amy Grant for "Ageless Medley"
- Best Gospel Performance, Male
  - Russ Taff for Walls of Glass
- Best Gospel Performance by a Duo or Group
  - Larnelle Harris & Sandi Patti for "More Than Wonderful"
- Best Soul Gospel Performance, Female
  - Sandra Crouch for We Sing Praises
- Best Soul Gospel Performance, Male
  - Al Green for I'll Rise Again
- Best Soul Gospel Performance by a Duo or Group
  - Barbara Mandrell & Bobby Jones for "I'm So Glad I'm Standing Here Today"
- Best Inspirational Performance
  - Donna Summer for "He's a Rebel"

=== Historical ===
- Best Historical Album
  - Allan Steckler & Stanley Walker (producers) for The Greatest Recordings of Arturo Toscanini - Symphonies, Vol. I

=== Jazz ===
- Best Jazz Vocal Performance, Female
  - Ella Fitzgerald for The Best Is Yet to Come
- Best Jazz Vocal Performance, Male
  - Mel Tormé for Top Drawer
- Best Jazz Vocal Performance, Duo or Group
  - The Manhattan Transfer for "Why Not!"
- Best Jazz Instrumental Performance, Soloist
  - Wynton Marsalis for Think of One
- Best Instrumental Jazz Performance, Group
  - Phil Woods for At the Vanguard
- Best Instrumental Jazz Performance, Big Band
  - Rob McConnell for All in Good Time
- Best Jazz Fusion Performance, Vocal or Instrumental
  - Pat Metheny Group for Travels

=== Latin ===
- Best Latin Pop Performance
  - Jose Feliciano for Me enamoré
- Best Tropical Latin Performance
  - Tito Puente for On Broadway performed by Tito Puente & His Latin Ensemble
- Best Mexican-American Performance
  - Los Lobos for "Anselma"

=== Musical show ===
- Best Cast Show Album
  - Andrew Lloyd Webber (producer) & the original Broadway cast for Cats (Complete Original Broadway Cast Recording)

=== Music video ===
- Best Video, Short Form
  - Girls on Film/Hungry Like the Wolf – Duran Duran
- Best Video Album
  - Duran Duran – Duran Duran

=== Packaging and notes ===
- Best Album Package
  - Speaking in Tongues
  - Robert Rauschenberg (art director) (Talking Heads)
- Best Album Notes
  - The Interplay Sessions
  - Orrin Keepnews (notes writer) (Bill Evans)

=== Pop ===
- Best Pop Vocal Performance, Female
  - "Flashdance... What a Feeling" – Irene Cara
- Best Pop Vocal Performance, Male
  - Thriller – Michael Jackson
- Best Pop Performance by a Duo or Group with Vocals
  - "Every Breath You Take" – The Police
- Best Pop Instrumental Performance
  - "Being With You" – George Benson

=== Production and engineering ===
- Best Engineered Recording, Non-Classical
  - Thriller
  - Bruce Swedien (engineer) (Michael Jackson)
- Best Engineered Recording, Classical
  - James Lock (engineer), Georg Solti (conductor) & the Chicago Symphony Orchestra for Mahler: Symphony No. 9 in D
- Producer of the Year (Non-Classical)
  - Michael Jackson & Quincy Jones
- Classical Producer of the Year
  - Marc Aubort & Joanna Nickrenz

=== R&B ===
- Best R&B Vocal Performance, Female
  - Chaka Khan – Chaka Khan
- Best R&B Vocal Performance, Male
  - "Billie Jean" – Michael Jackson
- Best R&B Performance by a Duo or Group with Vocal
  - "Ain't Nobody" – Chaka Khan & Rufus
- Best R&B Instrumental Performance
  - "Rockit" – Herbie Hancock
- Best Rhythm & Blues Song
  - "Michael Jackson (songwriter) for "Billie Jean"

=== Rock ===
- Best Rock Vocal Performance, Female
  - "Love Is a Battlefield" – Pat Benatar
- Best Rock Vocal Performance, Male
  - "Beat It" – Michael Jackson
- Best Rock Performance by a Duo or Group with Vocal
  - Synchronicity – The Police
- Best Rock Instrumental Performance
  - "Brimstone and Treacle" – Sting

=== Spoken ===
- Best Spoken Word or Non-musical Recording
  - Copland: A Lincoln Portrait – William Warfield
