= Todo (album) =

Studio album by Juan Gabriel
- Released: June 11, 1983
- Recorded: 1982–1983
- Genres: Ranchera, mariachi
- Labels: RCA Records, Ariola
- Producers: Juan Gabriel, Chuck Anderson

Juan Gabriel chronology
Cosas de Enamorados (1982)	Todo (1983)	Recuerdos, Vol. II (1984)

Todo (Everything) is the eighteenth studio album by Juan Gabriel, released in 1983. Todo received a nomination for a Grammy Award for Best Mexican/Mexican-American Album.

== Track listing ==
All tracks are written by Juan Gabriel.

No.	Title	Length
1.	"No Vale la Pena"	2:32
2.	"Caray"	3:49
3.	"Todo"	2:27
4.	"Nada Mas Decidete"	2:07
5.	"Yo Me Voy"	3:06
6.	"La Farsante"	2:55
7.	"Ya No Quiero Volver Con Usted"	2:32
8.	"La Madrileña"	4:12
9.	"Isi"	3:35
10.	"Tengo Que Olvidar"	3:16

== Sales ==
Region	Certification	Certified units/sales
Mexico	—	300,000
Summaries
Worldwide	—	1,000,000
