= Euforia (La Mafia album) =

Studio album by La Mafia
- Released: September 1, 1998
- Genre: Tejano
- Label: Sony
- Producer: Armando Lichtenberger Jr.

La Mafia chronology
En Tus Manos (1997)	Euforia (1998)	Momentos (1999)

Euforia is the twenty-first studio album by La Mafia released on September 1, 1998.

== Track listing ==
No.	Title	Length
1.	"Ayer y Hoy"	3:39
2.	"Ahora"	3:32
3.	"Pase lo Que Pase"	3:29
4.	"Nadie Como Tu"	3:21
5.	"Si Tu No Estas"	3:32
6.	"No la He Podido Olvidar"	3:10
7.	"Tal Vez Puedas Quereme"	3:30
8.	"Pido"	3:29
9.	"Por Hacerte Feliz"	3:19
10.	"Nueva"	3:21

== Charts ==
Chart (1998)	Peak position
US Top Latin Albums (Billboard)	21
US Regional Mexican Albums (Billboard)	6

== Certifications ==
Region	Certification	Certified units/sales
United States (RIAA)	Platinum (Latin)	60,000^{‡}
^{‡} Sales+streaming figures based on certification alone.
