= Herencia Norteña =

1986 studio album by La Mafia

Studio album by La Mafia
- Released: October 19, 1985
- Genre: Tejano
- Label: Cara Records
- Producer: Luis Gómez-Escolar · Julio Seijas · Honorio Herrero

La Mafia chronology
Neon Static (1985)	Herencia Norteña (1985)	La Mafia 1986 (1986)

Herencia Norteña is the ninth studio album by American musical group La Mafia, released on October 19, 1985. It entered the latin billboard regional charts at number 12 and by November 1985 it reached peak position number 7. On September 15, 2017 a re-mastered version of the album was released in digital form.

== Track listing ==
No.	Title	Length
1.	"Mira, Mira"
2.	"Hazme el Milagro"
3.	"Se Acaborn las Tristezas"
4.	"Pisoteando Mi Sangre"
5.	"Se Acabo El Amor"
6.	"Perdi la Esperanza"
7.	"El Amor Que Te Ofrezco"
8.	"Quedate"
9.	"Amor Chiquito"
10.	"Bouquet de Rosas"
