= La Mafia 1986 =

Studio album by La Mafia
- Released: April 5, 1986
- Genre: Tejano
- Label: CBS Records
- Producer: Luis Gómez-Escolar · Julio Seijas · Honorio Herrero

La Mafia chronology
Herencia Norteña (1985)	La Mafia 1986 (1986)	A Todo Color (1987)

La Mafia 1986 is the tenth studio album by La Mafia released on April 5, 1986. The album entered the Billboard Latin Regional chart at number 25. It reached number one and stayed there for one week.

== Track listing ==
No.	Title	Length
1.	"Nunca Nunca"
2.	"El Exito"
3.	"Loco Por Ti"
4.	"No Me Beses"
5.	"Tanto Tiempo"
6.	"Quiero Yo Saber"
7.	"Si Tu Supieras (featuring Cornelio Reyna)"
8.	"Que Es lo Que Debo Hacer (Sorry Seems to Be the Hardest Word)"
9.	"No Me Puede Escapar De Ti" ((featuring Rocío Banquells))
10.	"Sólo Llame Para Decirte Que Te Amo (I Just Called To Say I Love You)"
11.	"Y Esa Fuiste Tu"
12.	"Que Te Pasa"
