= Top Drawer =

Studio album by Mel Tormé
- Released: 1983
- Recorded: May 1983
- Genre: Vocal jazz
- Length: 38:41
- Label: Concord
- Producer: Carl Jefferson

Mel Tormé chronology
The Classic Concert Live (1982)	Top Drawer (1983)	An Evening at Charlie's (1983)

Professional ratings
Review scores
Source	Rating
Allmusic	4/5 stars
The Penguin Guide to Jazz Recordings	3/4 stars

Top Drawer is a 1983 album by Mel Tormé, accompanied by George Shearing.

At the 26th Grammy Awards, Tormé's performance on this album won him the Grammy Award for Best Jazz Vocal Performance, Male.

== Track listing ==
1. "A Shine on Your Shoes" (Howard Dietz, Arthur Schwartz) – 3:06
2. "How Do You Say Auf Wiedersehen?" (Johnny Mercer, Tony Scibetta) – 5:45
3. "Oleo" (Sonny Rollins) – 4:15
4. "Stardust" (Hoagy Carmichael, Mitchell Parish) – 5:45
5. "Hi Fly" (Randy Weston) – 3:24
6. "Smoke Gets in Your Eyes" (Otto Harbach, Jerome Kern) 6:02
7. "What's This?" (Dave Lambert) – 3:13
8. "Away in a Manger" (Traditional) – 3:51
9. "Here's to My Lady" (Rube Bloom, Mercer) – 3:20

== Personnel ==
- Mel Tormé - vocals
- George Shearing - piano
- Don Thompson - double bass
