= Walk on the Water (album) =

Studio album by Gerry Mulligan and His Orchestra
- Released: 1980
- Recorded: September 1980
- Studio: Downtown Sound Studios, New York City
- Genre: Jazz
- Length: 38:33
- Label: DRG
- Producer: Gerry Mulligan

Gerry Mulligan chronology
Lionel Hampton Presents Gerry Mulligan (1977)	Walk on the Water (1980)	The Classic Concert Live (1982)

Walk on the Water is an album by American jazz saxophonist Gerry Mulligan and His Orchestra featuring performances recorded in 1980 and first released on the DRG label. In 1982, the album received the Grammy Award for Best Large Jazz Ensemble Album.

== Reception ==
Professional ratings
Review scores
Source	Rating
AllMusic	4/5 stars
The Penguin Guide to Jazz Recordings	3/4 stars

AllMusic awarded the album 4 stars with its review by Scott Yanow stating, "Baritonist Gerry Mulligan has had few opportunities to record with a big band since his Concert Jazz Band broke up in 1963, a real pity considering how talented a composer and arranger he has been. This DRG release features a strong orchestra performing several of Jeru's compositions".

== Track listing ==
All compositions by Gerry Mulligan except where noted.

1. "For an Unfinished Woman" – 7:13
2. "Song for Strayhorn" – 6:08
3. "Forty Second and Broadway" – 5:07
4. "Angelica" (Mitchel Forman) – 6:25
5. "Walk on the Water" – 4:24
6. "Across the Track Blues" (Duke Ellington) – 3:10
7. "I'm Gettin' Sentimental Over You" (George Bassman, Ned Washington) – 6:06

== Personnel ==
- Gerry Mulligan – baritone saxophone (tracks 1, 2, 4, 6 & 7), soprano saxophone (tracks 3 & 5), arranger
- Laurie Frink, Barry Ries, Tom Harrell, Mike Davis, Danny Hayes – trumpet
- Keith O'Quinn, Dave Glenn, Alan Raph – trombone
- Eric Turkel, Gerry Niewood, Ken Hitchcock – alto saxophone
- Gary Keller, Ralph Olson, Seth Brody – tenor saxophone
- Joe Temperley – baritone saxophone
- Mitchel Forman – piano
- Jay Leonhart, Mike Bocchicchio (track 1) – double bass
- Richard DeRosa – drums
- Tom Fay – arranger (track 1)
