= The Classic Concert Live =

Live album by Mel Tormé, Gerry Mulligan, George Shearing
- Released: February 15, 2005
- Recorded: June 29, 1982
- Genre: Vocal jazz, jazz
- Length: 38:41
- Label: Concord
- Producer: Chris Dunn

Mel Tormé chronology
An Evening with George Shearing & Mel Tormé (1982)	The Classic Concert Live (2005)	Top Drawer (1983)

Gerry Mulligan chronology
Walk on the Water (1980)	The Classic Concert Live (1982)	Little Big Horn (1983)

The Classic Concert Live is a live album by Mel Tormé, Gerry Mulligan, and George Shearing, recorded at Carnegie Hall in 1982 and released in 2005.

Shearing and Tormé would go on to make six albums together for Concord Records, this is the only recorded performance of Shearing and Tormé with Gerry Mulligan.

== Reception ==
Professional ratings
Review scores
Source	Rating
Allmusic	3.5/5 stars

The Allmusic review by Matt Collar said that the trio of Tormé, Mulligan and Shearing sounded "terrific", with Shearing "in fine form with his urbane keyboard style adding dramatic punch throughout the night".

== Track listing ==
1. "I've Heard That Song Before" (Sammy Cahn, Jule Styne) – 2:53
2. "I Sent for You Yesterday and Here You Come Today" (Count Basie, Eddie Durham, Jimmy Rushing) – 4:55
3. "Jeru" (Gerry Mulligan) – 4:05
4. Duke Ellington medley: "Don't Get Around Much Anymore"/"Just Squeeze Me (But Please Don't Tease Me)" (Duke Ellington, Bob Russell)/(Ellington, Lee Gaines) – 5:24
5. "What Are You Doing the Rest of Your Life?" (Alan and Marilyn Bergman, Michel Legrand) – 6:20
6. "Walkin' Shoes" (Mulligan) – 3:58
7. "'Round Midnight" (Cootie Williams, Bernie Hanighen, Thelonious Monk) – 5:56
8. "Line for Lyons" (Mulligan) – 5:22
9. Talk – 0:52
10. "Wave"/"Water to Drink (Agua de Beber)" (Antonio Carlos Jobim)/(Jobim, Vinícius de Moraes, Norman Gimbel) – 6:03
11. "Blues in the Night" (Harold Arlen, Johnny Mercer) – 11:28
12. "The Song is Ended (but the Melody Lingers On)" (Irving Berlin) – 3:05
13. "Oh, Lady Be Good!" (George Gershwin, Ira Gershwin) – 4:47

== Personnel ==
Performance

- Mel Tormé – vocals
- George Shearing – piano, vocals
- Gerry Mulligan – baritone saxophone, vocals
- Richard DeRosa – drums
- Don Thompson – double bass, piano
- Frank Luther – double bass
- Mitchel Forman – piano
- Tom Boras – saxophone
- Gary Keller
- Mike Milgore
- Chuck Wilson
- Richard Chamberlain – trombone
- Jim Daniels
- Dave Glenn
- Michael Carubia – trumpet
- Laurie Frink
- Gary Guzio
- Chris Rogers

Production

- Abbey Anna – art direction
- Dale Sheets – associate producer
- Barry Hatcher – author
- Tim Owens – engineer
- John Burk – executive producer
- Ken Dryden – liner notes
- Seth Presant – mastering, mixing
- Andrew Pham – package design
- Franca Rota Mulligan – photography
- Marc Perlman
- Christian Steiner
- Chris Dunn – producer
