= Anselma =

Song by Los Lobos

from the album ...And a Time to Dance
- Released: 1956; 1983
- Genre: Roots rock, Tex-Mex
- Label: Slash
- Songwriters: César Suedan Manzur, Guadalupe Trigo
- Producers: T-Bone Burnett, Steve Berlin

"Anselma" is a 1956 song written by César Suedan and Guadalupe Trigo. It is a traditional Mexican two step with accordion accompaniment. In 1983 it won a surprise Grammy for "Best Mexican-American Performance" for Los Lobos.

== Background ==
In 1956 the song was released as La anselma by Luis Pérez Meza con Los cadernales de Jalisco. In 1983 it was produced by T-Bone Burnett and Steve Berlin, and performed by American band Los Lobos for their EP ...And a Time to Dance. The song earned the first Grammy Award for Best Mexican/Mexican-American Performance at the 26th Grammy Awards.
