= Con Tanto Amor =

Studio album by La Mafia
- Released: December 1, 1990
- Genre: Tejano · Grupero · Rock · Latin pop · Latin ballad · dance-pop · Tropical · Salsa · Cumbia · Norteño
- Label: CBS Records
- Producer: Juan Carlos Calderón

La Mafia chronology
Enter the Future (1990)	Con Tanto Amor (1990)	Homenaje a Javier Solís (1991)

Con Tanto Amor (With So Much Love) is the fifteenth studio album by La Mafia. It was released on December 1, 1990. The album entered at number twenty-four on the billboard charts and reached number five by 1991. On September 15, 2017 a re-mastered version of the album was released in digital form.

== Track listing ==
No.	Title	Writer(s)	Length
1.	"Pedazo de Cariño"	Juan Carlos Calderón	3:02
2.	"Con un Besito"	José María Cano	2:34
3.	"No lo Hare"	Nacho Cano	3:36
4.	"¿Creó Qué Soy Sexy? (Da Ya Think I'm Sexy?)"	Rod Stewart, Carmine Appice, Duane Hitchings, Juan Carlos Calderón	3:38
5.	"Iremos Juntos (We Go Together)" (featuring OV7)	Jim Jacobs, Warren Casey, Juan Carlos Calderón	3:32
6.	"Sí El Amor Se Va (Se O Amor Se Vai)"	Roberto Livi, Bebu Silvetti	4:19
7.	"Massachusetts (Massachusetts)"	Barry Gibb, Juan Carlos Calderón, Maurice Gibb, Robin Gibb	2:31
8.	"La Incondicional"	Juan Carlos Calderón	3:55
9.	"Un Momento En El Tiempo (One Moment in Time)"	John Bettis, Albert Hammond, Juan Carlos Calderón	4:39
10.	"El Primero"	Juan Carlos Calderón	3:10
11.	"Ven Con El Alma Desnuda"	David Beigbeder	3:25
12.	"Me Casite del Cielo"	Juan Carlos Calderón	3:11
13.	"No Es Tan Facil"	Juan Carlos Calderón	3:18
14.	"Un Cariño"	Juan Carlos Calderón	3:07
15.	"Pienso en Ti"	José María Cano	3:40
16.	"No Quiero Ya Llorar Por Tu Cariño"	Nacho Cano	3:12
17.	"Vacio Sin Ti"	Juan Carlos Calderón	3:42
18.	"Con Tanto Amor"	Juan Carlos Calderón	2:44

== Personnel ==
- Oscar De La Rosa — Vocal
- Armando Lichtenberger Jr. — Accordion, Keyboards And Producer
- David De La Garza III — Keyboards And Vocal
- Rudy Martinez — Bass guitar
- Alan Lopez — Drums
- Viktor Pacheko — Guitar
- Robbie Longoria — Bajo Sexto, Percussions And Conga
- Juan Carlos Calderón — Piano And Synthe serésizers
- K.C. Porter — Piano And Synthesizers
- Randy Kerber — Piano And Synthesizers
- José María Cano — Piano And Synthesizers
- Nacho Cano — Piano And Synthesizers
- Randy Kerber, Juan Carlos Calderón, José María Cano, Nacho Cano and K.C. Porter — Keyboards
- Juan Carlos Calderón — Producer
- José María Cano — Producer
- Nacho Cano — Producer
- OV7 — Vocal
- Jerry Hey — Trumpet And Flugelhorn (Track 5)
- Bill Reichenbach — Trombone (Track 5)
- Antonio Molto — Soprano Saxophone, Alto Saxophone, Tenor Saxophone And Baritono Saxophone (Track 5)
- Najee — Saxophone And Flute (Track 5)
- Conjunto de Cuerda de Madrid — Strings (Track 7)
- The Philadelphia Orchestra — Orchestral (Track 4, 5, 6, 7, 8, 9, 10 And 11)
