= Grammy Award for Best Jazz Vocal Performance, Male =

Honor presented to male recording artists for quality jazz vocal performances

- Awarded for: Quality male jazz vocal performances
- Country: United States
- Presented by: National Academy of Recording Arts and Sciences
- First award: 1981
- Final award: 1991
- Website: grammy.com

The Grammy Award for Best Jazz Vocal Performance, Male was an honor presented at the Grammy Awards, a ceremony that was established in 1958 and originally called the Gramophone Awards, to male recording artists for quality jazz vocal performances (songs or albums). Honors in several categories are presented at the ceremony annually by the National Academy of Recording Arts and Sciences of the United States to "honor artistic achievement, technical proficiency and overall excellence in the recording industry, without regard to album sales or chart position".

Prior to 1981, the gender-neutral category of Best Jazz Vocal Performance existed. The first award specifically for male performances was presented to George Benson in 1981 for the song "Moody's Mood". The category remained unchanged until 1985, when it was combined with the award for Best Jazz Vocal Performance, Female and presented in the genderless category. Gender-specific awards were once again presented from 1986 until 1991. In 1992, the two categories were combined and presented as the category Best Jazz Vocal Performance. This category was later renamed to Best Jazz Vocal Album beginning in 2001. While the gender-specific award has not been presented since the category merge in 1992, an official confirmation of its retirement has not been announced.

Bobby McFerrin holds the record for the most wins in this category, with a total of four consecutive wins from 1986 to 1989 (once along with Jon Hendricks). Mel Tormé and Harry Connick, Jr. each received the award twice. An American artist received the award each year it was presented. Tormé holds the record for the most nominations, with six. Mark Murphy and Joe Williams hold the record for the most nominations without a win, with a total of four each.

== Recipients ==
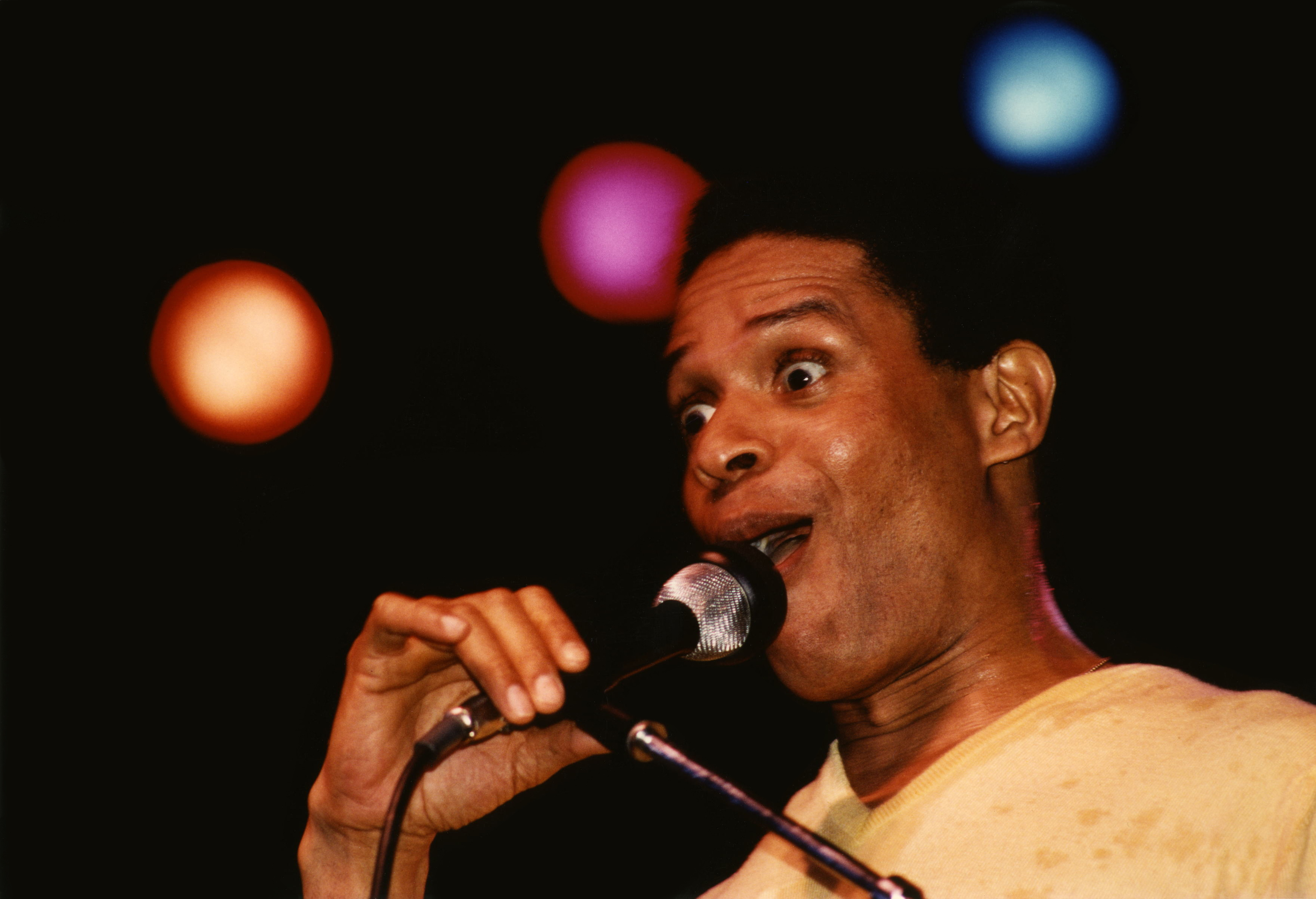
1982 award winner Al Jarreau

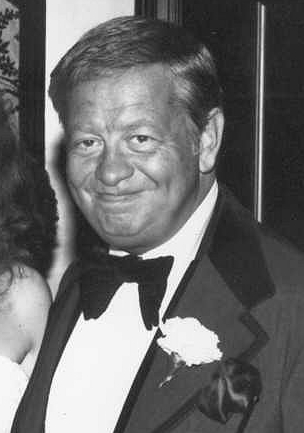
Two-time award winner Mel Tormé

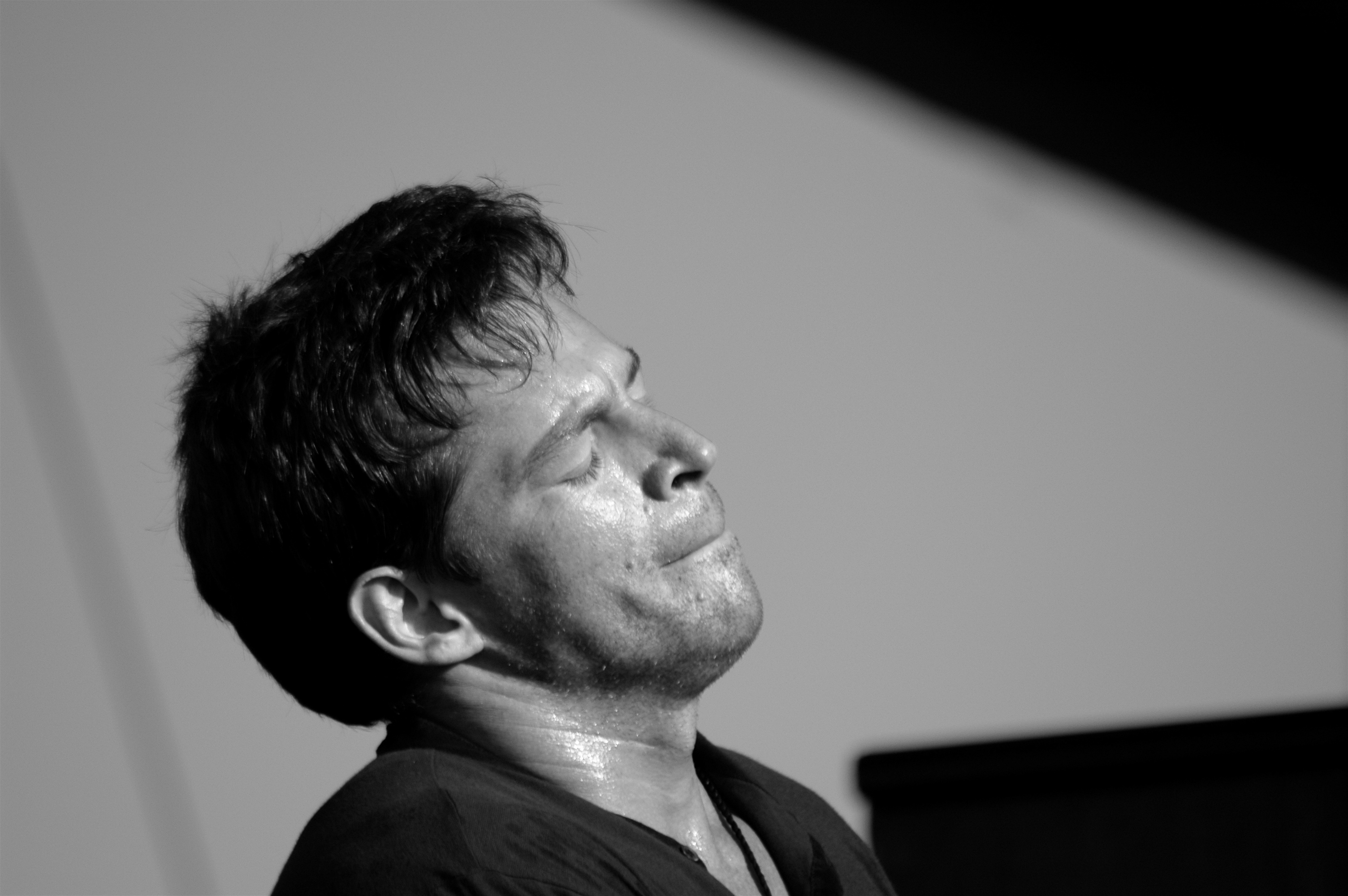
Two-time award winner Harry Connick, Jr.

Chronological list of award recipients and nominees along with all nominated works
| Year^{[I]} | Performing artist(s) | Work | Nominees | Ref. |
|---|---|---|---|---|
| 1981 | George Benson | "Moody's Mood" | Bill Henderson – Street of Dreams; Mark Murphy – Satisfaction Guaranteed; Slam Stewart – Sidewalks of New York; Mel Tormé – Tormé: A New Album | |
| 1982 | Al Jarreau | "(Round, Round, Round) Blue Rondo à la Turk" | Johnny Hartman – Once in Every Life; Jimmy Rowles – Music's the Only Thing (That's) On My Mind; Mel Tormé – Mel Tormé and Friends Recorded Live at Marty's New York City; Joe Turner – Have No Fear, Joe Turner Is Here | |
| 1983 | Mel Tormé | An Evening with George Shearing & Mel Tormé | Dave Frishberg – The Dave Frishberg Songbook, Volume One; Bill Henderson – A Tribute to Johnny Mercer; Mark Murphy – Bop for Kerouac; Joe Williams – "8 to 5 I Lose" | |
| 1984 | Mel Tormé | Top Drawer | Mose Allison – Lessons in Living; Dave Frishberg – The Dave Frishberg Songbook, Volume Two; Jon Hendricks – Cloudburst; Jimmy Witherspoon – Jimmy Witherspoon Sings the Blues with Panama Francis and the Savoy Sultans | |
| 1985^{[II]} | — | — | — | |
| 1986 | Bobby McFerrin and Jon Hendricks | "Another Night in Tunisia" | George Benson – "Beyond the Sea"; Dave Frishberg – Live at Vine Street; Mark Murphy – Mark Murphy Sings Nat's Choice; Alan Paul – "Oh Yes, I Remember Clifford" | |
| 1987 | Bobby McFerrin | "'Round Midnight" | Grady Tate – "She's Out of My Life"; Mel Tormé – An Elegant Evening; Joe Williams – I Just Want to Sing; Jimmy Witherspoon – Midnight Lady Called the Blues | |
| 1988 | Bobby McFerrin | "What Is This Thing Called Love?" | Billy Eckstine and Benny Carter – Billy Eckstine Sings with Benny Carter; Dave Frishberg – Can't Take You Nowhere; Arthur Prysock – This Guy's in Love With You; Joe Williams – Every Night | |
| 1989 | Bobby McFerrin | "Brothers" | Mose Allison – Ever Since the World Ended; João Gilberto – Live in Montreux; Mark Murphy – September Ballads; Mel Tormé – A Vintage Year | |
| 1990 | Harry Connick, Jr. | When Harry Met Sally... | George Benson – Tenderly; Dr. John – In a Sentimental Mood; Lou Rawls – At Last; Joe Williams – In Good Company | |
| 1991 | Harry Connick, Jr. | We Are in Love | Tony Bennett – Astoria: Portrait of the Artist; George Benson – Big Boss Band; Jon Hendricks – Freddie Freeloader; Bobby McFerrin – "Scrapple from the Apple" | |

^{^[I]} Each year is linked to the article about the Grammy Awards held that year.
^{^[II]} Award was combined with the Best Jazz Vocal Performance, Female category and presented in a genderless category known as Best Jazz Vocal Performance.

== See also ==
- Grammy Award for Best Jazz Vocal Performance, Duo or Group
- List of Grammy Award categories
