= Amor y Sexo =

Studio album by La Mafia
- Released: June 3, 2014
- Genre: Tejano · Grupero · Rock · Latin pop · Latin ballad · dance-pop · Tropical · Salsa · Cumbia · Norteño
- Label: Urbana Records
- Producer: Áureo Baqueiro

La Mafia chronology
Eternamente Romanticos (2008)	Amor y Sexo (2014)	Non-Stop (2017)

Amor y Sexo (Love and Sex) is the twenty-eighth studio album by La Mafia released on June 3, 2014. This album was released after a six-year absence. La Mafia held a release party to celebrate the album and their return to the studio. They also announced a tour under the same name. The album reached the top 10 on the Billboard Top Latin Albums chart.

== Track listing ==
No.	Title	Length
1.	"Me Mata"	3:56
2.	"Seria Mas Facil"	3:25
3.	"Quiero Amarte"	3:07
4.	"Provocacion"	3:36
5.	"A Donde Va el Amor"	3:30
6.	"Una Cancion Para Olvidar"	3:24
7.	"Toda Dama lo Amerita"	3:33
8.	"No Me Abandones"	3:15
9.	"Soy Facil"	2:21
10.	"Protegeré"	2:31
11.	"Amor y Sexo"	3:23
