= Santiago Jiménez Jr. =

American folk musician

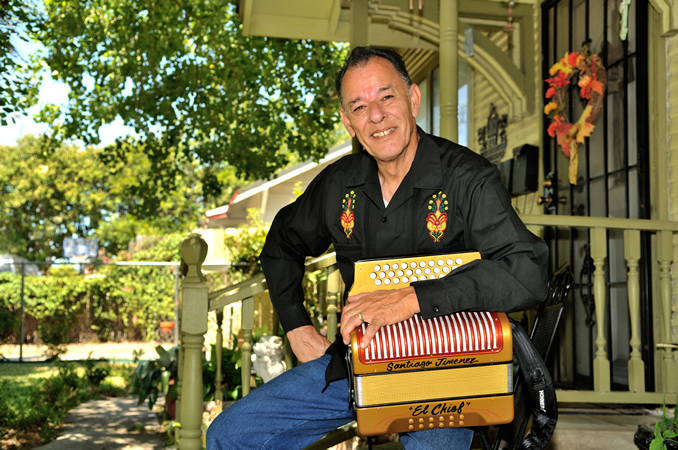
Jiménez in 2000

Santiago Jiménez Jr. (a.k.a. Santiago Henriquez Jiménez) (born April 8, 1944) is an American folk musician who received a National Heritage Fellowship in 2000 for lifetime achievement in traditional Tex-Mex/folk music, and a National Medal of Arts in 2016. He has been nominated for three Grammys.

His father, Santiago "Flaco" Jiménez Sr. was a pioneer of conjunto music and pioneered the use of stringed bass (tololoche) in his work. His older brother Leonardo "Flaco" Jiménez is considered by many the greatest and most famous Tejano accordionist ever. Santiago recorded his first album with his brother Flaco at age 17. Unlike Flaco, who is noted for mixing his music with many styles outside the Tejano mainstream, Santiago has emulated his father and stuck with the formulas of accordion, guitar, and vocals.

Santiago has recorded over 700 songs on numerous labels. He also founded his own label, Chief Records. Santiago has performed on multiple continents and at many festivals. In 2012, Santiago and Flaco played together at the Tejano Conjunto Festival in San Antonio, the first time they were on the same stage since 1982.

President Obama awarded Santiago a 2015 National Medal of Arts on September 22, 2016, for his contribution to American music.

In 2021, Jiménez released Still Kicking, a collection of traditional conjunto songs produced by San Antonio musician Garrett T. Capps.
