= Contigo (album) =

Studio album by La Mafia
- Released: October 16, 2000
- Genre: Tejano
- Label: Fonovisa Records
- Producer: Armando Lichtenberger Jr.

La Mafia chronology
Momentos (1999)	Contigo (2000)	Inconfundible (2001)

Contigo (With You) is the twenty-third studio album by La Mafia. It was released on October 16, 2000. The album reached number five on the billboard charts. The album was nominated for the 2002 Grammy Awards for Best Mexican/Mexican-American album. This is the first album on Fonovisa Records label.

== Track listing ==
No.	Title	Length
1.	"Amor Secreto"	3:45
2.	"Contigo"	3:20
3.	"Sabor a la Fiesta"	3:11
4.	"Cuando Tu Me Besas"	3:35
5.	"No Puedo Controlarte (Esperando Tu Adios)"	3:19
6.	"Llorar Conmigo"	3:38
7.	"No Llores Mas Corazon"	3:12
8.	"Eres (featuring Lili Arce)"	3:45
9.	"Nuevo Amanecer (Podria Decir)"	3:10
10.	"Morir Soñando"	3:17

== Chart position ==
Year	Chart	Peak
2000	Billboard Regional Mexican Albums	5
2000	Billboard Top Latin Albums	25
