= Vida (La Mafia album) =

Studio album by La Mafia
- Released: April 23, 1994
- Genre: Tejano
- Label: Sony
- Producer: Armando Lichtenberger Jr.

La Mafia chronology
Ahora y Siempre (1992)	Vida (1994)	Éxitos En Vivo (La Mafia album) (1995)

Vida (Life) is the eighteenth studio album by La Mafia, released on April 23, 1994. The album reach the number two spot and stayed there for forty-seven weeks on the Billboard Latin Pop chart. "Vida" and "Me Duele Estar Solo" reached the number one spot. Vida was nominated for a Lo Nuestro Award for Pop Album of the Year at the 7th Lo Nuestro Awards.

== Track listing ==
No.	Title	Length
1.	"Me Duele Estar Solo"	3:28
2.	"Con Todo el Corazón"	4:01
3.	"Más Que un Sueño"	3:09
4.	"Hazme una Señal"	3:24
5.	"Llueve"	3:07
6.	"Vida"	3:26
7.	"Perdóname, Volvalmos Al Amor"	3:33
8.	"Voy Pidiéndole a la Vida"	3:29
9.	"Buena Suerte"	3:41
10.	"Yo Soy Ese Romántico"	3:15
11.	"Yo Quería"	3:24
12.	"Cada Vuelta de Esquina"	2:46
13.	"Forbidden Love" (bonus track)	4:02

== Chart positions ==
Year	Chart	Peak
1994	Billboard Latin Pop	1
1994	Billboard Top Latin Albums	2

== Certifications ==
Region	Certification	Certified units/sales
United States (RIAA)	5× Platinum (Latin)	300,000^{‡}
^{‡} Sales+streaming figures based on certification alone.
