= La Mafia =

American musical group

- La Mafia singer Oscar de la Rosa shaking hands with fans at a concert

Background information
- Origin: Houston, Texas, United States
- Genres: Tejano, cumbia
- Years active: 1980–present
- Labels: Urbana Records, Universal Music Latin Entertainment
- Members: Oscar De La Rosa; Armando Lichtenberger Jr. Rudy Martinez; Alan Lopez; David Delagarza III; Victor Pacheco; Robbie Longoria
- Website: http://www.lamafia.com

La Mafia is an American five-time Grammy Award-winning musical group. It has its roots in the Northside neighborhood of Houston, Texas, and has charted a course as a Latin music band.

== History ==
La Mafia was founded in 1980 in Houston, Texas. Vocalist Oscar De La Rosa and producer Armando Lichtenberger Jr. created an original style that survived various changes in the music industry. The band consists of Oscar De La Rosa on vocals, Armando Lichtenberger Jr. on Keyboard & Accordion, Rudy Martinez on bass, David De La Garza on keyboards and background vocals, Alan Lopez on drums, Victor Pacheco on Guitar and Robbie Longoria on bajo-sexto & percussion . In 2007 the band won 2 Grammys & 3 Latin Grammys and was nominated in 2009 for a Latin Grammy for the album Eternamente Romanticos. In 2020, the group won a Latin Grammy award for its 2019 album "Live in Mexico."

La Mafia, seeking to expand their musical horizons, began touring extensively in Mexico and Latin America beginning in the late 1980s. The practice of Mexican-American artists performing in Mexico on a large scale was unheard of before La Mafia.

== Band members ==
- Oscar De La Rosa – vocalist
- Armando Lichtenberger Jr. – accordion, keyboards, producer
- David De La Garza III – keyboards, vocals
- Rudy Martinez – bass guitar
- Alan Lopez – drums
- Viktor Pacheko – guitar
- Robbie Longoria – bajo sexto, percussions, congas

=== Former members ===
- Leonardo Gonzales (brother of Oscar De La Rosa Gonzales) – guitar
- Robert Martinez – guitar, bass guitar
- Marion Aquilina – guitar
- Israel (Speedy) Villanueva – bass guitar
- Adolf Alonso – bass guitar
- Tim Ruiz – bass guitar
- Tony Rodriguez – drums
- Mario Gonzalez – drums
- Adam Mosqueda – drums
- Jason Rodriguez – bass guitar
- Michael Aguilar – drums
- Jesse Moreno – saxophone
- Jesse Peralez – saxophone (died 2025)
- Rick Patino – saxophone, trumpet
- David Flores – saxophone
- Joe Gonzales – drums
- Joe Ovalle – bass guitar
- Johnny Gonzalez – drums
- Eduardo Torres – drums

== Discography ==
- 1980: La Mafia de Oscar y Leonardo Gonzales
- 1981: Only In Texas
- 1982: The Magnificent 7
- 1982: Honey (Cariño)
- 1983: Electrifying
- 1983: Mafia Mania
- 1984: Hot Stuff
- 1985: Neon Static
- 1985: Herencia Norteña
- 1986: La Mafia 1986
- 1987: A Todo Color
- 1988: Homenaje a Nelson Ned & Roberto Carlos
- 1988: Amame
- 1989: Xplosiv
- 1990: Enter the Future
- 1990: Con Tanto Amor
- 1991: Homenaje a Javier Solís
- 1991: Estas Tocando Fuego
- 1992: Ahora y Siempre
- 1994: Vida
- 1996: Un Millón de Rosas (Grammy Winner)
- 1997: En Tus Manos (Grammy Winner)
- 1998: Euforia
- 1999: Momentos
- 2000: Contigo
- 2001: Inconfundible
- 2004: Nube Pasajera
- 2004: Para El Pueblo (Latin Grammy Winner)
- 2008: Eternamente Romanticos
- 2014: Amor y Sexo
- 2017: Non-Stop
- 2018: Vozes

=== Compilations, duets, and live albums ===
- 1981: La Mafia
- 1984: 15 Hits
- 1987: La Mafia Live
- 1991: Party Time
- 1991: 1991
- 1992: Dancin' With La Mafia
- 1993: Nuestras Mejores Canciones – 17
- 1995: Puro Tejano
- 1995: Éxitos En Vivo
- 1998: Hits De Coleccion Vol. 1
- 2001: Para Enamorados
- 2002: Tejano All Stars
- 2003: Los Hits
- 2003: 30 Éxitos Insuperables
- 2006: Nuevamente (Latin Grammy Winner)
- 2006: La Historia de La Mafia: Los Exitos
- 2008: Leyendas
- 2011: La Mafia: Live in the 80s
- 2019: Live in Mexico (2020 Latin Grammy)

== Awards and recognitions ==
La Mafia received Grammy Awards for its CDs Un Millón de Rosas (1997) and En Tus Manos (1998) and Latin Grammy Awards for its CDs Para El Pueblo (2005), Nuevamente (2006), and Live in Mexico (2020). It also has received eight Premio Lo Nuestro Awards and 12 Tejano Music Awards, including a Lifetime Achievement Award from the latter, numerous Billboard awards and was listed in the top 10 Billboard Latin Artists for the entire decade of the 1990s, ranking La Mafia as the most successful Latin artist Houston has ever produced.

La Mafia received the first Billboard Hot Latin Song of the Year (formally Hot Latin Track of the Year) in 1994 for their song "Me Estoy Enamorando."
