= Gary Keller (saxophonist) =

American jazz musician

Gary Keller (born October 7, 1953) is a jazz and classical saxophonist, recording artist, a lecturer at the Frost School of Music at the University of Miami, and a Conn-Selmer Artist. He has played with Woody Herman, Frank Sinatra, and Jaco Pastorius, among many over a career spanning more than four decades. He appears on numerous recordings. He has performed in the pit of Broadway orchestras and for television shows.

== Biography ==
Gary Keller is a native of East Aurora, a village near Buffalo, New York. He holds a Bachelor of Music (B.M.) degree from the State University of New York at Fredonia He received his Master of Music (M.M.). from the Frost School of Music at the University of Miami. Keller has studied under Joe Allard, David Liebman, Pat LaBarbera, and Bob Mover among others. Keller was a professor at the University of Miami from 1982-2021.

== Career ==
Keller is the founder of the Miami Saxophone Quartet. He is a member of the South Florida Jazz Orchestra. He has performed at clubs and jazz festivals, and lectured about jazz and music performance at colleges and universities in the United States, Japan, and Europe. numerous national and international recordings, television shows, Broadway pit orchestras.

Keller made his debut solo recording in 1999, Blues For An Old New Age. Saxophone Journal has called Keller an "admired and respected as a virtuoso performer and world class educator.”

“Keller’s tunes are an exemplary bunch…A thinkers delight…extremely well done,” according to The Penguin Guide to Jazz on CD. He appeared on the July/August 2002 cover of Saxophone Journal, a trade publication.

He lectures and teaches at schools around the world, and has been an Artist in Residence at the Johannes Gutenberg-Universität, Mainz and has taught and performed at the Thomas Jefferson Institute, the University of Brasília, Brasília, Brazil, and the IASJ Summer Workshop at the Souza Lima Conservatory in São Paulo, Brazil, among others.

=== Performed with ===
Keller has appeared with numerous jazz artists including:

- Manny Album
- David Baker
- Tony Bennett
- Natalie Cole
- Vic Damone
- Michael Feinstein
- Clare Fischer
- Billy Hart
- Woody Herman
- Dave Liebman
- Johnny Mathis
- Chico O'Farrill
- Jaco Pastorius
- Jim McNeely
- Adam Nussbaum
- Lou Rawls
- Troy Roberts
- Lupa Santiago
- Maria Schneider
- Frank Sinatra
- Dr. Lonnie Smith
- Ira Sullivan
- Mel Torme
- Rosanna Vitro
- Kenny Werner
- Kenny Wheeler

=== Bands and combos ===
Keller has appeared with numerous big bands and combos:

- American Jazz Philharmonic
- Alan Baylock Big Band
- Drive By Big Band
- Woody Herman Thundering Herd
- The Jaco Pastorius Big Band
- Miami Saxophone Quartet
- Rosanna Vitro Quartet
- Word of Mouth Revisited Big Band
- Stephen Guerra Big Band
- University of Miami Concert Jazz Band

=== Classical performances ===
Keller has performed/recorded classical works with:

- Chamber Music Palm Beach
- Festival Orchestra of Santo Domingo
- Florida Philharmonic
- Frost Symphony Orchestra
- New World Symphony
- Naples Philharmonic
- St. Petersburg (Russia) Philharmonic

=== Clubs and venues ===
- Blue Note Jazz Club, Tokyo, Japan
- Hard Rock Live, Hollywood, Florida

=== Jazz festivals ===
- Montreux Jazz Festival Japan, 2011
- Rochester Jazz Festival, 2010 - with the Miami Saxophone Quartet
- Scranton Jazz Festival, 2012

=== As author ===
Keller is the author of The Jazz Chord/Scale Handbook (Advance Music), an advanced-level music book on jazz chord progressions and scales.

== Discography ==
- Live at UMO (2026) - featuring Jarmo Savolainen, piano, Ulf Krokfors, bass, Markku Ounaskari, drums
- Fourtified - Miami Saxophone Quartet (2008)
- Midnight Rumba - Miami Saxophone Quartet with special guests Arturo Sandoval and Jon Secada (2005)
- Miami Saxophone Quartet Live - Miami Saxophone Quartet (2003)
- Take Four Giant Steps - Miami Saxophone Quartet (2002)
- Blues For An Old New Age (1999) - Double-Time Records

With Gerry Mulligan

- Walk on the Water (DRG, 1980)
