= Neon Static =

Studio album by La Mafia
- Released: June 29, 1985
- Genre: Tejano
- Label: Cara Records
- Producer: Luis Gómez-Escolar · Julio Seijas · Honorio Herrero

La Mafia chronology
Hot Stuff (1984)	Neon Static (1985)	Herencia Norteña (1985)

Neon Static is the eighth studio album by La Mafia released on June 29, 1985. It peaked on the Billboard Regional Mexican chart at number fourteen.

== Track listing ==
No.	Title	Length
1.	"Nada"
2.	"It's OK"
3.	"Lo Mejor Que Yo Tengo"
4.	"Quiero Verte"
5.	"Mí Sol (O sole mio)"
6.	"Popurrí José Alfredo Jiménez"
7.	"Ya Me Despido"
8.	"Quien Te Ha Privado"
9.	"El Rey de los Tontos"
10.	"Feliz, Feliz, Feliz"
11.	"Can't Dance To The Static"
12.	"Lo Que Daria Por Ti"
