= Inconfundible (La Mafia album) =

Studio album by La Mafia
- Released: October 22, 2001
- Genre: Tejano
- Label: Fonovisa
- Producer: Armando Lichtenberger Jr.

La Mafia chronology
Contigo (2000)	Inconfundible (2001)	Nube Pasajera (2004)

Inconfundible (Unmistakable) is the twenty-fourth studio album by La Mafia. It was released on October 22, 2001.

== Track listing ==
No.	Title	Length
1.	"Me Haces Falta"	3:19
2.	"Y Que Sera"	3:36
3.	"Murmullo de Sol"	3:25
4.	"Ayudame Luna"	3:01
5.	"Estoy Enamorado"	3:09
6.	"Y Ahora Que"	3:22
7.	"Destino"	3:38
8.	"Mi Otra Mitad"	3:25
9.	"Tan Solo"	3:00
10.	"Push Push"	3:39
