= Armando Lichtenberger Jr. =

American musician (born 1961)

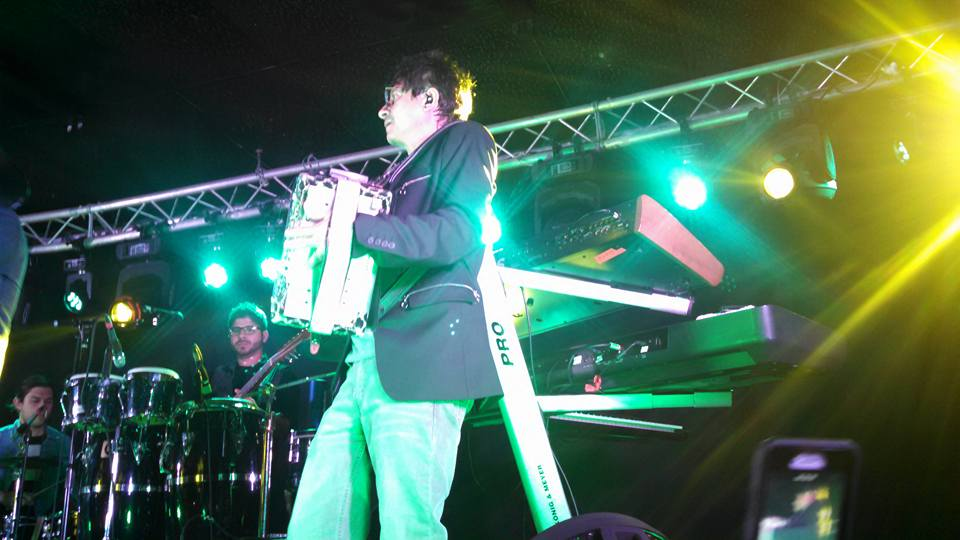

Background information
- Genres: Latin Pop, Tejano
- Occupations: Musician, Record Producer
- Instruments: Keyboards, Accordion
- Years active: 1980–Present
- Label: Urbana Records

Armando Liechtenberger Jr. (born June 3, 1961) is a member of Tejano musical band La Mafia, where he is the keyboardist, accordionist, and producer. Mando Lichtenberger started his career at the age of fourteen with Los Fronterizos as the keyboard and accordion player. The band, led by Tony Cortez, Sr., became known in Houston for their local Tejano styles and were once regarded as the city's hottest low-rider band. On February 23, 2017 Mando's father Armando Liechtenberger Sr. died at the age of 79.
