= México En La Piel Tour =

2005–07 concert tour by Luis Miguel

- Tour by Luis Miguel
- Associated album: México en la Piel; Navidades
- Start date: September 13, 2005
- End date: September 23, 2007
- Legs: 5
- No. of shows: 106 in North America; 12 in South America; 11 in Europe; 129 total
- Attendance: 1,554,000
- Box office: $95 million($148.18 in 2024 dollars)

Luis Miguel concert chronology
- 33 Tour (2003–04); México En La Piel Tour (2005–07); Cómplices Tour (2008–09)

México En La Piel Tour was a concert tour performed by Luis Miguel in support of his studio albums México en la Piel and later Navidades during 2006–2007. On this tour, Luis Miguel performed his recent pop songs, his newest mariachi songs, and also his back-catalogue. Two press conferences were held to present the album México en la Piel – one in the National Art Museum (MUNAL) of Mexico City and another in Madrid (art gallery near the National Art Museum Reina Sofía). In late 2006, Luis Miguel presents his album Navidades in New York City.

== History ==
To promote México en la Piel, Miguel began a tour on 13 September 2005 at the Save Mart Center in Fresno, California. The singer toured the United States, Mexico, South America and Spain. The tour ended on 23 September 2007 at the Hyundai Pavilion in San Bernardino, California. It grossed over $90 million from 124 performances and over 1.4 million spectators, the highest-grossing tour by a Latin artist. The tour's set list consisted of mariachi songs from México en la Piel, boleros and uptempo tracks from Miguel's previous albums. He included songs from his holiday album, Navidades (2006), for the tour's fourth leg.

This tour started in the United States during mid-September 2005 in Fresno, and ran by important theaters and places in the United States like Madison Square Garden in New York, the Gibson Amphitheatre in Los Angeles, and other cities like Las Vegas, San Diego, Chicago, Washington, D.C., Houston, Boston, Dallas and Miami.

By the end of November 2005, just after the US, he performed in South America, in places such as the José Amalfitani Stadium in Buenos Aires, Argentina and in the National Stadium and the Quinta Vergara Amphitheater in Chile, gathering over 200,000 people in only seven concerts. Later, he returned to the US and performed in Miami to close the 2005 tour.

In the start of 2006, Luis Miguel established a record of 30 consecutive concerts in the National Auditorium in Mexico City. After that, he toured several cities in Mexico such as Monterrey, Chihuahua, Torreón, Veracruz, Villahermosa, Cancún, Guadalajara, Culiacán, and Mexicali among other cities. The Mexican portion of the tour ended in Tijuana, with a memorable concert in which a storm hit the city during the concert. Days after that, Luis Miguel resumed performing in US cities. The leg ended in Las Vegas, during April 2006.

In November 2006, he returned from a long pause (during that time, Navidades was produced) to perform 5 concerts in Mexico, before ending the year. In May 2007, he restarted the tour in Spain, a country that he had not visited since 2004, in cities like Barcelona, Bilbao, Elche, Gran Canaria and Madrid. After one month of presentations, he did four more concerts in Venezuela, to close that part of the tour in Caracas.

In September 2007, Luis Miguel gave seven more concerts in United States to close the tour, including three concerts in The Colosseum at Caesars Palace in Las Vegas on Mexico's Independence Day, and other cities like Santa Ynez and Salinas.

== Tour set list ==
México En La Piel Tour: (35 shows) Sep/13/2005 – Nov/6/2005

México En La Piel Tour: (35 shows) Sep/13/2005 – Nov/6/2005
No.	Title	Original album	Length
1.	"Introduction [Horn Driven]"
2.	"Que Nivel De Mujer"	Aries
3.	"Con Tus Besos"	33
4.	"Up Beat Medley" (Dame Tu Amor / Sol, Arena Y Mar / Suave)	Aries, Amarte Es Un Placer
5.	"Me Niego A Estar Solo (Only in Fresno)"	Aries
6.	"Romance Medley" (No Me Platiques Más / Contigo En La Distancia / Usted / La Puerta / La Barca / No Sé Tú / Inolvidable)	Romance
7.	"Segundo Romance Medley" (El Día Que Me Quieras / Historia De Un Amor / Nosotros)	Segundo Romance
8.	"Romances Medley" (Por Debajo De La Mesa / La Gloria Eres Tú / Bésame Mucho)	Romances
9.	"Mis Romances Medley" (Perfidia / Tú Me Acostumbraste / La Última Noche / Amor, Amor, Amor)	Mis Romances
10.	"Introduction [Strings]"
11.	"Pensar En Ti"	Aries
12.	"Te Necesito"	33
13.	"Introduction [Mariachi]"
14.	"El Viajero"	México en la Piel
15.	"Entrega Total (Sometimes)"	México en la Piel
16.	"Échame A Mi La Culpa"	México en la Piel
17.	"México En La Piel"	México en la Piel
18.	"Cruz De Olvido (Sometimes)"	México en la Piel
19.	"De Que Manera Te Olvido"	México en la Piel
20.	"Motivos"	México en la Piel
21.	"Que Seas Feliz"	México en la Piel
22.	"Sabes Una Cosa"	México en la Piel
23.	"Y (Sometimes)"	Vivo
24.	"La Bikina"	Vivo
25.	"Mi Ciudad"	Mexico En La Piel: Edicion Diamante
26.	"Closer Medley" (Vuelve / Eres / Cómo Es Posible Que A Mi Lado / Será Que No Me Amas / Te Propongo Esta Noche)	33, Nada Es Igual, 20 Años, Amarte Es Un Placer
27.	"Te Propongo Esta Noche (Reprise)"	Amarte Es Un Placer

México En La Piel Tour: (11 shows) Nov/10/2005 – Nov/30/2005

México En La Piel Tour: (11 shows) Nov/10/2005 – Nov/30/2005
No.	Title	Original album	Length
1.	"Introduction [Horn Driven]"
2.	"Que Nivel De Mujer"	Aries
3.	"Con Tus Besos"	33
4.	"Up Beat Medley" (Dame Tu Amor / Sol, Arena Y Mar / Suave)	Aries, Amarte Es Un Placer
5.	"Romance Medley" (No Me Platiques Más / Contigo En La Distancia / Usted / La Puerta / La Barca / No Sé Tú / Inolvidable)	Romance
6.	"Segundo Romance Medley" (El Día Que Me Quieras / Historia De Un Amor / Nosotros)	Segundo Romance
7.	"Romances Medley" (Por Debajo De La Mesa / La Gloria Eres Tú / Bésame Mucho)	Romances
8.	"Mis Romances Medley" (Perfidia / Tú Me Acostumbraste / La Última Noche / Amor, Amor, Amor)	Mis Romances
9.	"Introduction [Strings]"
10.	"Pensar En Ti (Sometimes)"	Aries
11.	"Te Necesito"	33
12.	"Introduction [Mariachi]"
13.	"El Viajero"	México en la Piel
14.	"México En La Piel (Sometimes)"	México en la Piel
15.	"De Que Manera Te Olvido (Sometimes)"	México en la Piel
16.	"Motivos (Sometimes)"	México en la Piel
17.	"Que Seas Feliz (Sometimes)"	México en la Piel
18.	"Sabes Una Cosa"	México en la Piel
19.	"La Bikina"	Vivo
20.	"Mi Ciudad"	Mexico En La Piel: Edicion Diamante
21.	"Oldies Medley" (Decídete / Los Muchachos De Hoy / Ahora Te Puedes Marchar / La Chica Del Bikini Azul / Isabel / Cuando Calienta El Sol)	Decídete, Fiebre De Amor, Palabra De Honor, Soy Como Quiero Ser
22.	"Closer Medley" (Vuelve / Eres / Cómo Es Posible Que A Mi Lado / Será Que No Me Amas / Te Propongo Esta Noche)	33, Nada Es Igual, 20 Años, Amarte Es Un Placer
23.	"Te Propongo Esta Noche (Reprise)"	Amarte Es Un Placer

México En La Piel Tour: (56 shows) Jan/18/2006 – Apr/15/2006

México En La Piel Tour: (56 shows) Jan/18/2006 – Apr/15/2006
No.	Title	Original album	Length
1.	"Introduction [Horn Driven]"
2.	"Que Nivel De Mujer"	Aries
3.	"Con Tus Besos"	33
4.	"Up Beat Medley" (Dame Tu Amor / Sol, Arena Y Mar / Suave)	Aries, Amarte Es Un Placer
5.	"Romance Medley" (No Me Platiques Más / Contigo En La Distancia / Usted / La Puerta / La Barca / No Sé Tú / Inolvidable)	Romance
6.	"Segundo Romance Medley" (El Día Que Me Quieras / Historia De Un Amor / Nosotros)	Segundo Romance
7.	"Romance Medley" (Por Debajo De La Mesa / La Gloria Eres Tú / Bésame Mucho)	Romances
8.	"Mis Romances Medley" (Perfidia / Tú Me Acostumbraste / La Última Noche / Amor, Amor, Amor)	Mis Romances
9.	"Te Necesito"	33
10.	"Introduction [Mariachi]"
11.	"El Viajero"	México en la Piel
12.	"Entrega Total"	México en la Piel
13.	"Échame A Mi La Culpa"	México en la Piel
14.	"México En La Piel"	México en la Piel
15.	"De Que Manera Te Olvido"	México en la Piel
16.	"Motivos"	México en la Piel
17.	"Que Seas Feliz"	México en la Piel
18.	"Sabes Una Cosa"	México en la Piel
19.	"La Bikina"	Vivo
20.	"Mi Ciudad"	Mexico En La Piel: Edicion Diamante
21.	"Oldies Medley" (Decídete / Los Muchachos De Hoy / Ahora Te Puedes Marchar / La Chica Del Bikini Azul / Isabel / Cuando Calienta El Sol)	Decídete, Fiebre De Amor, Palabra De Honor, Soy Como Quiero Ser
22.	"Closer Medley" (Vuelve / Eres / Cómo Es Posible Que A Mi Lado / Será Que No Me Amas / Te Propongo Esta Noche)	33, Nada Es Igual, 20 Años, Amarte Es Un Placer
23.	"Te Propongo Esta Noche (Reprise)"	Amarte Es Un Placer

México En La Piel Tour: (5 shows) Nov/22/2006 – Dec/10/2006

Navidades Tour : (5 shows) Nov/22/2006 – Dec/10/2006
No.	Title	Original album	Length
1.	"Introduction [Horn Driven]"
2.	"Que Nivel De Mujer"	Aries
3.	"Con Tus Besos"	33
4.	"Up Beat Medley" (Dame Tu Amor / Sol, Arena Y Mar / Suave)	Aries, Amarte Es Un Placer
5.	"Romance Medley" (No Me Platiques Más / Contigo En La Distancia / Usted / La Puerta / La Barca / No Sé Tú / Inolvidable)	Romance
6.	"Romances Medley" (Por Debajo De La Mesa / La Gloria Eres Tú / Bésame Mucho)	Romances
7.	"Mis Romances Medley" (Perfidia / Tú Me Acostumbraste / La Última Noche / Amor, Amor, Amor)	Mis Romances
8.	"Te Necesito"	33
9.	"Introduction [Mariachi]"
10.	"El Viajero"	México en la Piel
11.	"México En La Piel"	México en la Piel
12.	"De Que Manera Te Olvido"	México en la Piel
13.	"Que Seas Feliz"	México en la Piel
14.	"Sabes Una Cosa"	México en la Piel
15.	"La Bikina"	Vivo
16.	"Mi Ciudad"	Mexico En La Piel: Edicion Diamante
17.	"Santa Claus Llegó A La Ciudad"	Navidades
18.	"Frente A La Chimenea"	Navidades
19.	"Oldies Medley" (Decídete / Los Muchachos De Hoy / Ahora Te Puedes Marchar / La Chica Del Bikini Azul / Isabel / Cuando Calienta El Sol)	Decídete, Fiebre De Amor, Palabra De Honor, Soy Como Quiero Ser

México En La Piel Tour: (15 shows) Apr/27/2007 – May/26/2007

México En La Piel Tour: (15 shows) Apr/27/2007 – May/26/2007
No.	Title	Original album	Length
1.	"Introduction [Horn Driven]"
2.	"Que Nivel De Mujer"	Aries
3.	"Con Tus Besos"	33
4.	"Up Beat Medley" (Dame Tu Amor / Sol, Arena Y Mar / Suave)	Aries, Amarte Es Un Placer
5.	"Romance Medley" (No Me Platiques Más / Contigo En La Distancia / Usted / La Puerta / La Barca / No Sé Tú / Inolvidable)	Romance
6.	"Segundo Romance Medley" (El Día Que Me Quieras / Historia De Un Amor / Nosotros)	Segundo Romance
7.	"Romances Medley" (Por Debajo De La Mesa / La Gloria Eres Tú / Bésame Mucho)	Romances
8.	"Mis Romances Medley" (Perfidia / Tu me Acostumbraste / La Última Noche / Amor Amor Amor)	Mis Romances
9.	"Te Necesito"	33
10.	"El Viajero"	México en la Piel
11.	"Échame A Mi La Culpa"	México en la Piel
12.	"Que Seas Feliz"	México en la Piel
13.	"De Que Manera Te Olvido"	México en la Piel
14.	"Sabes Una Cosa"	México en la Piel
15.	"La Bikina"	Vivo
16.	"Mi Ciudad"	México en la Piel
17.	"Oldies Medley" (Decídete / Los Muchachos De Hoy / Ahora Te Puedes Marchar / La Chica Del Bikini Azul / Isabel / Cuando Calienta El Sol)	Decídete, Fiebre De Amor, Palabra De Honor, Soy Como Quiero Ser
18.	"Closer Medley" (Vuelve / Eres / Cómo Es Posible Que A Mi Lado / Será Que No Me Amas / Te Propongo Esta Noche)	33, Nada Es Igual, 20 Años, Amarte Es Un Placer
19.	"Te Propongo Esta Noche (Reprise)"	Amarte Es Un Placer

México En La Piel Tour: (7 shows) Sep/14/2007 – Sep/23/2007

México En La Piel Tour: (7 shows) Sep/14/2007 – Sep/23/2007
No.	Title	Original album	Length
1.	"Introduction [Horn Driven]"
2.	"Que Nivel De Mujer"	Aries
3.	"Con Tus Besos"	33
4.	"Up Beat Medley" (Dame Tu Amor / Sol, Arena Y Mar / Suave)	Aries, Amarte Es Un Placer
5.	"Romance Medley" (No Me Platiques Más / Contigo En La Distancia / Usted / La Puerta / La Barca / No Sé Tú / Inolvidable)	Romance
6.	"Hasta Que Me Olvides"	Aries
7.	"Romances Medley" (Por Debajo De La Mesa / La Gloria Eres Tú / Bésame Mucho)	Romances
8.	"La Incondicional"	Busca Una Mujer
9.	"Te Necesito"	33
10.	"Mexican Medley" (Mucho Corazón / La Media Vuelta / Amorcito Corazón)	Romance, Segundo Romance, Mis Romances
11.	"Introduction [Son De La Negra]"
12.	"El Viajero"	México en la Piel
13.	"Échame A Mi La Culpa"	México en la Piel
14.	"De Que Manera Te Olvido"	El Concierto
15.	"Amanecí En Tus Brazos"	México en la Piel
16.	"Si Nos Dejan"	El Concierto
17.	"México En La Piel"	México en la Piel
18.	"El Rey"	El Concierto
19.	"Mexico Lindo Y Querido"	never released by the artist
20.	"Sabes Una Cosa"	México en la Piel
21.	"La Bikina"	Vivo
22.	"Oldies Medley" (Decídete / Los Muchachos De Hoy / Ahora Te Puedes Marchar / La Chica Del Bikini Azul / Isabel / Cuando Calienta El Sol)	Decídete, Fiebre De Amor, Palabra De Honor, Soy Como Quiero Ser

== Tour dates ==
List of concerts, showing date, city, country, venue, tickets sold, number of available tickets and amount of gross revenue
Date	City	Country	Venue	Attendance	Revenue
North America – Leg 1
September 13, 2005	Fresno	United States	Save Mart Center	3,463 / 3,729	$272,062
September 15, 2005	Santa Barbara	United States	Santa Barbara Bowl	2,929 / 4,308	$234,031
September 16, 2005	Las Vegas	United States	Mandalay Bay Events Center	8,864 / 9,285	$859,005
September 17, 2005	Chula Vista	United States	Coors Amphitheatre	11,583 / 11,858	$753,640
September 20, 2005	Los Angeles	United States	Universal Amphitheatre	32,000 / 32,000	$3,133,975
September 21, 2005	Los Angeles	United States	Universal Amphitheatre	32,000 / 32,000	$3,133,975
September 22, 2005	Los Angeles	United States	Universal Amphitheatre	32,000 / 32,000	$3,133,975
September 23, 2005	Los Angeles	United States	Universal Amphitheatre	32,000 / 32,000	$3,133,975
September 24, 2005	Los Angeles	United States	Universal Amphitheatre	32,000 / 32,000	$3,133,975
September 25, 2005	Los Angeles	United States	Universal Amphitheatre	32,000 / 32,000	$3,133,975
September 28, 2005	San Jose	United States	HP Pavilion	10,268 / 10,268	$650,870
September 30, 2005	Tucson	United States	Anselmo Valencia Amphitheater	4,805 / 4,805	$294,463
October 1, 2005	Phoenix	United States	America West Arena	6,951 / 7,127	$606,005
October 2, 2005	Indian Wells	United States	Indian Wells Tennis Garden	4,099 / 6,801	$383,710
October 4, 2005	Denver	United States	Magness Arena	3,071 / 5,090	$214,135
October 8, 2005	El Paso	United States	El Paso County Coliseum	17,166 / 21,605	$811,551
October 9, 2005 (Note: The October 9, 2005 in El Paso was originally scheduled to take place on October 7, but was postponed due to "Bronchitis".)	El Paso	United States	El Paso County Coliseum	17,166 / 21,605	$811,551
October 11, 2005	Hidalgo	United States	Dodge Arena	9,856 / 10,921	$963,130
October 12, 2005	Hidalgo	United States	Dodge Arena	9,856 / 10,921	$963,130
October 13, 2005	San Antonio	United States	SBC Center	6,066 / 12,668	$383,100
October 15, 2005	Corpus Christi	United States	American Bank Center	—	—
October 16, 2005	Houston	United States	Toyota Center	8,983 / 12,037	$588,035
October 18, 2005	Rosemont	United States	Allstate Arena	7,844 / 10,263	$674,340
October 20, 2005	Boston	United States	Agganis Arena	2,958 / 6,528	$244,659
October 21, 2005	Ledyard	United States	Foxwoods Resort Casino	—	—
October 22, 2005	Atlantic City	United States	Taj Mahal	2,929 / 4,754	$272,735
October 23, 2005	New York City	United States	Madison Square Garden	11,160 / 14,943	$1,082,931
October 25, 2005	Fairfax	United States	Patriot Center	3,090 / 5,867	$273,183
October 26, 2005	Charlotte	United States	Cricket Arena	—	—
October 30, 2005	Orlando	United States	Orlando Centroplex	—	—
November 1, 2005	Raleigh	United States	RBC Center	—	—
November 2, 2005	Duluth	United States	Gwinnett Convention Center	—	—
November 4, 2005	Austin	United States	Frank Erwin Center	5,834 / 6,916	$442,330
November 5, 2005	Grand Prairie	United States	Nokia Theatre	5,243 / 5,687	$483,545
November 6, 2005	Laredo	United States	Laredo Entertainment Center	7,345 / 9,285	$554,077
South America I
November 10, 2005	Buenos Aires	Argentina	José Amalfitani Stadium	—	—
November 11, 2005	Buenos Aires	Argentina	José Amalfitani Stadium	—	—
November 12, 2005	Buenos Aires	Argentina	José Amalfitani Stadium	—	—
November 14, 2005	Punta del Este	Uruguay	Punta Del Este Resort & Casino	—	—
November 16, 2005	Córdoba	Argentina	Estadio Superdomo Orfeo	—	—
November 17, 2005	Córdoba	Argentina	Estadio Superdomo Orfeo	—	—
November 19, 2005	Santiago	Chile	Estadio Nacional	—	—
November 20, 2005	Viña del Mar	Chile	Quinta Vergara Amphitheater	—	—
North America II
November 25, 2005	Monterrey	Mexico	Cintermex VIP Concert	—	—
November 29, 2005 (Note: The November 29, 2005 in Miami was originally scheduled to take place on October 28, but was postponed due to "Hurricane Wilma Risk".)	Miami	United States	American Airlines Arena	19,383 / 25,870	$1,465,426
November 30, 2005 (Note: The November 30, 2005 in Miami was originally scheduled to take place on October 29, but was postponed due to "Hurricane Wilma Risk".)	Miami	United States	American Airlines Arena	19,383 / 25,870	$1,465,426
North America III - Leg 2
January 18, 2006	Mexico City	Mexico	National Auditorium	267,528 / 283,590	$19,286,000
January 19, 2006	Mexico City	Mexico	National Auditorium	267,528 / 283,590	$19,286,000
January 20, 2006	Mexico City	Mexico	National Auditorium	267,528 / 283,590	$19,286,000
January 21, 2006	Mexico City	Mexico	National Auditorium	267,528 / 283,590	$19,286,000
January 22, 2006	Mexico City	Mexico	National Auditorium	267,528 / 283,590	$19,286,000
January 25, 2006	Mexico City	Mexico	National Auditorium	267,528 / 283,590	$19,286,000
January 26, 2006	Mexico City	Mexico	National Auditorium	267,528 / 283,590	$19,286,000
January 27, 2006	Mexico City	Mexico	National Auditorium	267,528 / 283,590	$19,286,000
January 28, 2006	Mexico City	Mexico	National Auditorium	267,528 / 283,590	$19,286,000
January 29, 2006	Mexico City	Mexico	National Auditorium	267,528 / 283,590	$19,286,000
February 1, 2006	Mexico City	Mexico	National Auditorium	267,528 / 283,590	$19,286,000
February 2, 2006	Mexico City	Mexico	National Auditorium	267,528 / 283,590	$19,286,000
February 3, 2006	Mexico City	Mexico	National Auditorium	267,528 / 283,590	$19,286,000
February 4, 2006	Mexico City	Mexico	National Auditorium	267,528 / 283,590	$19,286,000
February 5, 2006	Mexico City	Mexico	National Auditorium	267,528 / 283,590	$19,286,000
February 8, 2006	Mexico City	Mexico	National Auditorium	267,528 / 283,590	$19,286,000
February 9, 2006	Mexico City	Mexico	National Auditorium	267,528 / 283,590	$19,286,000
February 10, 2006	Mexico City	Mexico	National Auditorium	267,528 / 283,590	$19,286,000
February 11, 2006	Mexico City	Mexico	National Auditorium	267,528 / 283,590	$19,286,000
February 12, 2006	Mexico City	Mexico	National Auditorium	267,528 / 283,590	$19,286,000
February 14, 2006	Mexico City	Mexico	National Auditorium	267,528 / 283,590	$19,286,000
February 15, 2006	Mexico City	Mexico	National Auditorium	267,528 / 283,590	$19,286,000
February 16, 1006	Mexico City	Mexico	National Auditorium	267,528 / 283,590	$19,286,000
February 19, 2006	Mexico City	Mexico	National Auditorium	267,528 / 283,590	$19,286,000
February 20, 2006	Mexico City	Mexico	National Auditorium	267,528 / 283,590	$19,286,000
February 21, 2006	Mexico City	Mexico	National Auditorium	267,528 / 283,590	$19,286,000
February 24, 2006	Mexico City	Mexico	National Auditorium	267,528 / 283,590	$19,286,000
February 25, 2006	Mexico City	Mexico	National Auditorium	267,528 / 283,590	$19,286,000
February 26, 2006	Mexico City	Mexico	National Auditorium	267,528 / 283,590	$19,286,000
February 27, 2006	Mexico City	Mexico	National Auditorium	267,528 / 283,590	$19,286,000
March 2, 2006	Monterrey	Mexico	Monterrey Arena	44,558 / 46,800	$3,362,552
March 3, 2006	Monterrey	Mexico	Monterrey Arena	44,558 / 46,800	$3,362,552
March 4, 2006	Monterrey	Mexico	Monterrey Arena	44,558 / 46,800	$3,362,552
March 5, 2006	Monterrey	Mexico	Monterrey Arena	44,558 / 46,800	$3,362,552
March 7, 2006	Chihuahua	Mexico	Estadio Chihuahua	12,076 / 12,076	$787,554
March 8, 2006	Torreón	Mexico	Estadio Corona	11,377 / 11,377	$817,061
March 10, 2006	Acapulco	Mexico	Mayan Palace	2,800 / 2,800	$743,652
March 12, 2006	Veracruz	Mexico	Estadio Luis "Pirata" Fuente	10,132 / 10,132	$706,399
March 14, 2006	Villahermosa	Mexico	Parque Tabasco	8,044 / 8,044	$671,403
March 16, 2006	Mérida	Mexico	Estadio Carlos Iturralde	13,813 / 13,813	$726,486
March 17, 2006	Cancún	Mexico	Mayan Palace	2,936 / 2,936	$666,392
March 19, 2006	Puebla	Mexico	Estadio Cuauhtémoc	14,583 / 14,583	$1,123,744
March 21, 2006	Aguascalientes	Mexico	Estadio Victoria	16,831 / 16,831	$874,234
March 22, 2006 (Note: Dinner show)	Guadalajara	Mexico	Estadio Tres de Marzo	22,127 / 22,127	$1,328,118
March 23, 2006	Guadalajara	Mexico	Estadio Tres de Marzo	22,127 / 22,127	$1,328,118
March 25, 2006	Puerto Vallarta	Mexico	Mayan Palace	2,210 / 2,210	$586,954
March 28, 2006	Culiacán	Mexico	Estadio Carlos Gonzalez	11,014 / 11,014	$856,085
March 31, 2006	Hermosillo	Mexico	Expoforo	9,899 / 9,899	$731,759
April 2, 2006	Mexicali	Mexico	Estadio Nido de las Aguilas	12,394 / 12,394	$923,877
April 3, 2006	Tijuana	Mexico	El Foro	1,213 / 1,213	$216,899
April 4, 2006	Tijuana	Mexico	Estadio Caliente	5,823 / 5,823	$1,288,775
April 7, 2006	Sacramento	United States	ARCO Arena	6,791 / 7,279	$527,040
April 8, 2006	Anaheim	United States	Arrowhead Pond	10,362 / 10,362	$892,862
April 9, 2006	San Diego	United States	Cox Arena	8,118 / 8,118	$718,213
April 13, 2006	Los Angeles	United States	Staples Center	11,202 / 11,202	$1,047,239
April 15, 2006	Las Vegas	United States	Mandalay Bay Events Center	6,987 / 7,600	$750,122
North America IV - Leg 3
November 22, 2006	Cancún	Mexico	Lagos del Sol Golf Club	—	—
December 1, 2006	Ensenada	Mexico	Terminal de Cruceros	—	—
December 5, 2006 (Note: Private bridal show)	Tijuana	Mexico	Hipodromo Agua Caliente	—	—
December 8, 2006 (Note: Private show)	Mexico City	Mexico	Centro Banamex	—	—
December 10, 2006	Guadalajara	Mexico	Guadalajara Country Club	—	—
Europe - Leg 4
April 27, 2007	Granada	Spain	Palacio de los Deportes	—	—
April 30, 2007	Barcelona	Spain	Palau Sant Jordi	—	—
May 1, 2007	Murcia	Spain	Plaza de Toros de Murcia	—	—
May 3, 2007	Bilbao	Spain	Bizkaia Arena	—	—
May 4, 2007	Castellón	Spain	Plaza de Toros	—	—
May 5, 2007	Elche	Spain	Ciudad Deportiva	—	—
May 8, 2007	Las Palmas	Spain	Estadio Gran Canaria	—	—
May 10, 2007	A Coruña	Spain	Coliseum da Coruña	—	—
May 11, 2007	Salamanca	Spain	Plaza de Toros de Salamanca	—	—
May 12, 2007	Madrid	Spain	Palacio de los Deportes	—	—
May 13, 2007	Madrid	Spain	Palacio de los Deportes	—	—
South America II
May 18, 2007	Valencia	Venezuela	Forum de Valencia	1,470 / 1,851	$334,940
May 20, 2007	Maracaibo	Venezuela	Estadio Maracaibo	4,793 / 4,793	$410,876
May 25, 2007	Caracas	Venezuela	Poliedro de Caracas	412 / 616	$207,163
May 26, 2007	Caracas	Venezuela	Estadio de la UCV	9,312 / 13,112	$641,187
North America V - Leg 5
September 14, 2007	Las Vegas	United States	The Colosseum at Caesars Palace	12,083 / 12,083	$1,578,904
September 15, 2007	Las Vegas	United States	The Colosseum at Caesars Palace	12,083 / 12,083	$1,578,904
September 16, 2007	Las Vegas	United States	The Colosseum at Caesars Palace	12,083 / 12,083	$1,578,904
September 20, 2007	Santa Ynez	United States	Chumash Casino	—	—
September 21, 2007	Concord	United States	Sleep Train Pavilion	10,834 / 12,500	$355,092
September 22, 2007	Salinas	United States	Salinas Sports Complex	—	—
September 23, 2007	San Bernardino	United States	Hyundai Pavilion	13,684 / 18,136	$465,075
Total				761,062 / 837,245 (90,9%)	$59,267,595

== Cancelled shows ==
List of cancelled concerts, showing date, city, country, venue, and reason for cancellation
Date	City	Country	Venue	Reason
October 6, 2005	Albuquerque	United States	Sandia Casino Amphitheater	Bronchitis

== Gallery ==
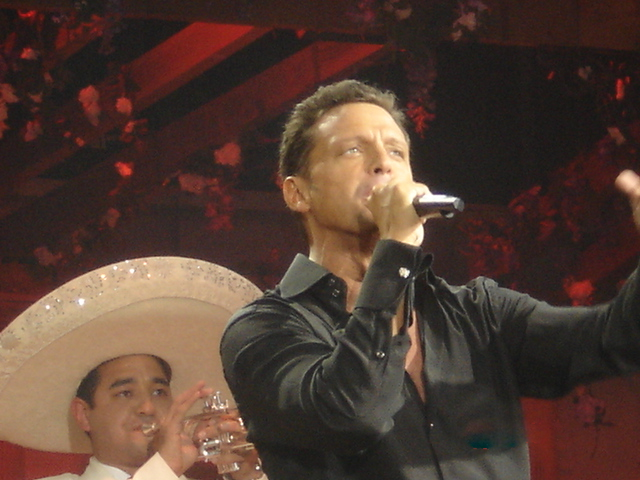
Luis Miguel singing during the first leg of the tour

Luis Miguel at the concert in Santiago de Chile
(Nov / 19 / 05)

Luis Miguel singing during the concert in Atlanta
(Nov / 2 / 05)

Luis Miguel singing during the concert in Hidalgo
(Oct / 12 / 05)

== Band ==
- Vocals: Luis Miguel
- Acoustic & electric guitar: Todd Robinson
- Bass: Lalo Carrillo
- Keyboards: Francisco Loyo
- Drums: Victor Loyo
- Percussion: Tommy Aros
- Saxophone: Jeff Nathanson
- Trumpet: Francisco Abonce
- Trombone: Alejandro Carballo
- Backing vocals: Menina Fortunato, Gina Katon

== See also ==
- List of highest-grossing concert tours by Latin artists

== Videoclips ==
- "Que Nivel de Mujer" in Chile (video at YouTube)
- "Usted" in Chile (video at YouTube)
