= Mis Romances Tour =

2002 concert tour by Luis Miguel

- Tour by Luis Miguel
- Associated album: Mis Romances; Mis Boleros Favoritos
- Start date: January 24, 2002
- End date: December 14, 2002
- Legs: 2
- No. of shows: 52 in North America; 5 in Europe; 6 in South America; 63 total
- Box office: $19.4 million (34 shows)

Luis Miguel concert chronology
- Amarte Es Un Placer Tour (1999–2000); Mis Romances Tour (2002); 33 Tour (2003–04)

The Mis Romances Tour was a concert tour performed by Luis Miguel during the year 2002 to promote his 2001 album Mis Romances (during the second half of the tour he also promote his compilation Mis Boleros Favoritos). The tour consisted in 63 concerts and ran through US, Mexico, Argentina, Spain, Chile, Uruguay, Peru, Dominican Republic and Puerto Rico. In February he performed at the Universal Amphitheatre in Los Angeles, California for six consecutive sold-out nights drawing more than 32,000 spectators, beating his previous record of five consecutive concerts in this venue, he played also two more concerts in September. Miguel performed at Mexico's Aztec Stadium for first time in his career in front of 80,000 spectators, and also gave twelve nights at National Auditorium in Mexico City.

== History ==
To promote Mis Romances, Luis Miguel began his Mis Romances Tour on 24 January 2002 in San Diego, California. After touring in the United States for a month, he performed one show in the Dominican Republic and Puerto Rico. Afterwards, he presented 13 shows in Mexico, including 12 consecutive shows at the National Auditorium. He also performed five shows at the Auditorio Coca-Cola in Monterrey, Mexico. Luis Miguel continued touring in the United States and ended the first leg of the tour 13 April 2002.

Luis Miguel commenced the second leg of his tour on 12 September 2002 in Chula Vista, California and presented three more shows in the United States. Luis Miguel's concerts in North America grossed over $16 million, the highest-grossing tour of the year by a Latin artist. After his performances in the United States, he made five recitals in Spain. He continued the second leg in South America performing in Chile, Peru, Uruguay, and Argentina. The tour concluded on 14 December 2002 in the Dominican Republic.

The Los Angeles Times editor Agustin Gurza compared Luis Miguel's box office sales at the Universal Amphitheater to Julio Iglesias and noted that it contrasted with the low sales of Mis Romances. The set list consisted of boleros from Mis Romances and its predecessors, as well as pop tracks and ballads from his music career.

== Set list ==
Leg 1 (January 24, 2002 – April 13, 2002)

No.	Title	Original album	Length
1.	"Introduction"
2.	"Amor, Amor, Amor"	Mis Romances
3.	"Tú Me Acostumbraste"	Mis Romances
4.	"Perfidia"	Mis Romances
5.	"Toda Una Vida"	Mis Romances
6.	"Medley" (Dame Tu Amor / Sol, Arena Y Mar / Suave)	Aries, Amarte Es Un Placer
7.	"O Tú, O Ninguna"	Amarte Es Un Placer
8.	"Medley" (Por Debajo De La Mesa / No Sé Tú / Como Duele)	Romances, Romance, Mis Romances
9.	"Medley" (Volver / Uno / El Día Que Me Quieras)	Mis Romances, Romances, Segundo Romance
10.	"La Última Noche"	Mis Romances
11.	"Introduction [Interlude]"
12.	"¿Qué Sabes Tú?"	Mis Romances
13.	"Historia De Un Amor"	Segundo Romance
14.	"Medley" (Cuando Vuelva A Tu Lado / Mañana De Carnaval / Delirio)	Romance, Romances, Segundo Romance
15.	"La Mentira"	Romance
16.	"Hasta Que Me Olvides"	Aries
17.	"Sin Ti"	Segundo Romance
18.	"Medley" (Mucho Corazón / La Media Vuelta / Amorcito Corazón)	Romance, Segundo Romance, Mis Romances
19.	"Echame A Mí La Culpa"	never released by the artist
20.	"Medley" (Y / La Bikina / Mi Ciudad)	Vivo, never released by the artist
21.	"Medley" (Cómo Es Posible Que A Mi Lado / Será Que No Me Amas / Te Propongo Esta Noche)	Nada Es Igual, 20 Años, Amarte Es Un Placer
22.	"Medley" (Ahora Te Puedes Marchar / La Chica del Bikini Azul / Isabel / Cuando Calienta El Sol)	Soy Como Quiero Ser, Palabra De Honor

Leg 2 (September 12, 2002 – December 14, 2002)

No.	Title	Original album	Length
1.	"Introduction"
2.	"Amor, Amor, Amor"	Mis Romances
3.	"Tú Me Acostumbraste"	Mis Romances
4.	"Perfidia"	Mis Romances
5.	"Toda Una Vida"	Mis Romances
6.	"Medley" (Dame Tu Amor / Sol, Arena Y Mar / Suave)	Aries, Amarte Es Un Placer
7.	"O Tú, O Ninguna"	Amarte Es Un Placer
8.	"Medley" (Por Debajo De La Mesa / No Sé Tú / Como Duele)	Romances, Romance, Mis Romances
9.	"Medley" (Volver / Uno / El Día Que Me Quieras)	Mis Romances, Romances, Segundo Romance
10.	"La Última Noche"	Mis Romances
11.	"Introduction [Interlude]"
12.	"¿Qué Sabes Tú?"	Mis Romances
13.	"Historia De Un Amor"	Segundo Romance
14.	"Somos Novios"	Segundo Romance
15.	"Medley" (Un Hombre Busca Una Mujer / Cuestión de Piel / Oro de Ley)	Busca Una Mujer, 20 Años
16.	"Hasta Que Me Olvides"	Aries
17.	"Medley (only in US)" (Y / La Bikina / Mi Ciudad)	Vivo, never released by the artist
18.	"Medley (excluded in US)" (Mucho Corazón / La Media Vuelta / Amorcito Corazón)	Romance, Segundo Romance, Mis Romances
19.	"Medley" (Cómo Es Posible Que A Mi Lado / Será Que No Me Amas / Te Propongo Esta Noche)	Nada Es Igual, 20 Años, Amarte Es Un Placer
20.	"Medley" (Ahora Te Puedes Marchar / La Chica del Bikini Azul / Isabel / Cuando Calienta El Sol)	Soy Como Quiero Ser, Palabra De Honor

== Tour dates ==
List of concerts, showing date, city, country, venue, tickets sold, number of available tickets and amount of gross revenue
Date	City	Country	Venue	Attendance	Revenue
North America - Leg 1
January 24, 2002	San Diego	United States	Cox Arena	13,101 / 17,004	$988,165
January 25, 2002	San Diego	United States	Cox Arena	13,101 / 17,004	$988,165
January 26, 2002	Las Vegas	United States	Mandalay Bay Events Center	8,227 / 8,227	$715,980
January 29, 2002	Los Angeles	United States	Universal Amphitheatre	32,294 / 32,294	$2,593,010
January 30, 2002	Los Angeles	United States	Universal Amphitheatre	32,294 / 32,294	$2,593,010
January 31, 2002	Los Angeles	United States	Universal Amphitheatre	32,294 / 32,294	$2,593,010
February 1, 2002	Los Angeles	United States	Universal Amphitheatre	32,294 / 32,294	$2,593,010
February 2, 2002	Los Angeles	United States	Universal Amphitheatre	32,294 / 32,294	$2,593,010
February 3, 2002	Los Angeles	United States	Universal Amphitheatre	32,294 / 32,294	$2,593,010
February 7, 2002	Houston	United States	Compaq Center	10,138 / 10,577	$628,870
February 9, 2002	Grand Prairie	United States	Dallas NextStage	5,851 / 5,851	$361,080
February 11, 2002	Rosemont	United States	Allstate Arena	7,170 / 10,000	$561,950
February 13, 2002	Lowell	United States	Tsongas Arena	3,662 / 5,762	$178,335
February 16, 2002	Miami	United States	Miami Arena	—N/a	—N/a
February 17, 2002	Miami	United States	Miami Arena	—N/a	—N/a
February 18, 2002	Orlando	United States	TD Waterhouse Centre	—N/a	—N/a
February 20, 2002 (Note: The February 20 concert at Quisqueya Stadium in Santo Domingo was broadcast live in the Dominican Republic by Telecentro.)	Santo Domingo	Dominican Republic	Estadio Quisqueya	—N/a	—N/a
February 23, 2002	San Juan	Puerto Rico	Hiram Bithorn Stadium	—N/a	—N/a
February 27, 2002	Guadalajara	Mexico	Estadio Tres de Marzo	—N/a	—N/a
March 2, 2002 (Note: The March 2 concert at Aztec Stadium in Mexico City was broadcast in Mexico by Televisa.)	Mexico City	Mexico	Aztec Stadium	—N/a	—N/a
March 6, 2002	Mexico City	Mexico	National Auditorium	112,974 / 118,872	$6,178,203
March 7, 2002	Mexico City	Mexico	National Auditorium	112,974 / 118,872	$6,178,203
March 8, 2002	Mexico City	Mexico	National Auditorium	112,974 / 118,872	$6,178,203
March 9, 2002	Mexico City	Mexico	National Auditorium	112,974 / 118,872	$6,178,203
March 10, 2002	Mexico City	Mexico	National Auditorium	112,974 / 118,872	$6,178,203
March 13, 2002	Mexico City	Mexico	National Auditorium	112,974 / 118,872	$6,178,203
March 14, 2002	Mexico City	Mexico	National Auditorium	112,974 / 118,872	$6,178,203
March 15, 2002	Mexico City	Mexico	National Auditorium	112,974 / 118,872	$6,178,203
March 16, 2002	Mexico City	Mexico	National Auditorium	112,974 / 118,872	$6,178,203
March 17, 2002	Mexico City	Mexico	National Auditorium	112,974 / 118,872	$6,178,203
March 19, 2002	Mexico City	Mexico	National Auditorium	112,974 / 118,872	$6,178,203
March 20, 2002	Mexico City	Mexico	National Auditorium	112,974 / 118,872	$6,178,203
March 22, 2002	Monterrey	Mexico	Auditorio Coca-Cola	—N/a	—N/a
March 23, 2002	Monterrey	Mexico	Auditorio Coca-Cola	—N/a	—N/a
March 24, 2002	Monterrey	Mexico	Auditorio Coca-Cola	—N/a	—N/a
March 25, 2002	Monterrey	Mexico	Auditorio Coca-Cola	—N/a	—N/a
March 26, 2002	Monterrey	Mexico	Auditorio Coca-Cola	—N/a	—N/a
March 29, 2002	El Paso	United States	Don Haskins Center	12,684 / 14,176	$798,713
March 30, 2002	El Paso	United States	Don Haskins Center	12,684 / 14,176	$798,713
April 1, 2002	San Antonio	United States	Freeman Coliseum	5,934 / 6,564	$409,758
April 2, 2002 (Note: The April 2, 2002 concert at Villa Real Convention Center in McAllen was originally scheduled to take place on February 8, 2002 but was postponed due to technical problems.)	McAllen	United States	Villa Real Convention Center	—N/a	—N/a
April 3, 2002	McAllen	United States	Villa Real Convention Center	—N/a	—N/a
April 6, 2002	Tucson	United States	Anselmo Valencia Amphitheater	4,455 / 4,455	$132,930
April 7, 2002	Tempe	United States	Gammage Auditorium	—N/a	—N/a
April 9, 2002	Denver	United States	Magness Arena	—N/a	—N/a
April 12, 2002 (Note: The April 12, 2002 concert at Madison Square Garden in New York City was originally scheduled to take place on February 14, 2002, but was canceled in the middle of the show and postponed due to "Illness".)	New York City	United States	Madison Square Garden	13,029 / 13,742	$1,123,980
April 13, 2002	Philadelphia	United States	First Union Spectrum	3,079 / 15,000	$256,460
North America - Leg 2
September 12, 2002	Chula Vista	United States	Coors Amphitheatre	7,590 / 8,908	$500,668
September 13, 2002	Las Vegas	United States	MGM Grand Garden Arena	—N/a	—N/a
September 14, 2002	Los Angeles	United States	Universal Amphitheatre	11,157 / 12,796	$1,002,240
September 15, 2002	Los Angeles	United States	Universal Amphitheatre	11,157 / 12,796	$1,002,240
Europe
October 8, 2002	Benidorm	Spain	Estadio Municipal Benidorm	9,943	€397,720
October 9, 2002	Barcelona	Spain	Palau Sant Jordi	18,937	€672,086
October 11, 2002	Madrid	Spain	Palacio Vistalegre	—N/a	—N/a
October 12, 2002	Madrid	Spain	Palacio Vistalegre	—N/a	—N/a
October 13, 2002	Madrid	Spain	Palacio Vistalegre	—N/a	—N/a
South America
November 16, 2002 (Note: The November 16 concert at National Stadium in Santiago was fully recorded for its partial transmission in Chile by UC13.)	Santiago	Chile	Estadio Nacional	—N/a	—N/a
November 18, 2002	Santiago	Chile	Centro San Carlos de Apoquindo	—N/a	—N/a
November 20, 2002	Lima	Peru	Lima Polo Club	—N/a	—N/a
November 22, 2002	Punta del Este	Uruguay	Hotel Conrad	—N/a	—N/a
November 24, 2002	Buenos Aires	Argentina	José Amalfitani Stadium	—N/a	—N/a
November 25, 2002 (Note: The November 25 concert at Vélez Sarsfield Stadium in Buenos Aires was fully recorded for its partial transmission in Argentina by Telefe.)	Buenos Aires	Argentina	José Amalfitani Stadium	—N/a	—N/a
North America
December 14, 2002 (Note: The December 14 concert at Altos de Chavón in La Romana was broadcast live in the Dominican Republic by Telecentro.)	La Romana	Dominican Republic	Altos de Chavón	—N/a	—N/a
Total				251,345 / 271,432 (92,6%)	$16,430,342

== Band ==
- Vocals: Luis Miguel
- Acoustic & electric guitar: Todd Robinson
- Bass: Lalo Carrillo
- Piano: Francisco Loyo
- Keyboards: Arturo Pérez
- Drums: Victor Loyo
- Percussion: Tommy Aros
- Saxophone: Jeff Nathanson
- Trumpet: Francisco Abonce
- Trombone: Alejandro Carballo
- Mariachi 2000
