= Coliseo GNP Seguros =

Football stadium

Coordinates: 20°41′38″N 103°24′58″W

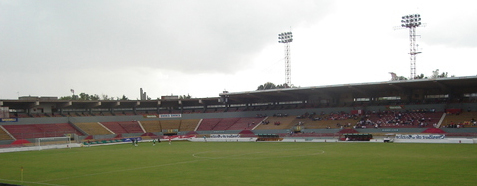
- Interactive map of Coliseo GNP Seguros
- Former names: Estadio Tres de Marzo (1971–2026)
- Location: Zapopan, Jalisco, Mexico
- Owner: Universidad Autónoma de Guadalajara
- Operator: Tecos; OCESA
- Capacity: 18,779
- Surface: Grass

Construction
- Opened: 1971
- Renovated: 1973, 1975, 1999, 2020, 2026

Tenants
- Tecos (Liga Premier) (1971–2026); Halcones de Zapopan (2020); Jaguares de Jalisco (2020); Reyes de Jalisco (LFA) (2022)

The Coliseo GNP Seguros (formerly the Estadio Tres de Marzo) is a stadium in Zapopan, Jalisco, Mexico. It is currently used for football and American football. The stadium is the home ground of Tecos of the Liga Premier de México. It has a capacity of 18,779 and was constructed inside the campus of the Universidad Autónoma de Guadalajara.

== History ==
Construction of the Estadio Tres de Marzo began on 1971, when the newly founded football team of the Universidad Autónoma de Guadalajara (UAG), that back then played in the third tier of Mexican football, needed a stadium. The steel stands were prefabricated and had a capacity of around 3,000 people. The stadium was named to honor the establishing date of the UAG: 3 March 1935.

In 1973, in virtue of UAG ascending to the second level of Mexican football and according to a ruling from the Mexican Football Federation that demanded that Second Division teams must have a stadium with minimum capacity of 15,000 people, new concrete stands were constructed on the sides of the pitch.

In 1975, after the Tecos de la UAG ascended to the Primera División de Mexico, the stands were once again remodeled in order to meet the minimum demands of the division which was 25,000 people.

The stadium once again went through renovation in order to accommodate the 1986 World Cup which brought the capacity to 30,015 people after new standing room areas were created.

In 1999, Estadio Tres de Marzo underwent its last major renovation which included improvements such as a new pitch and drainage system. The stadium earns its name for the founding date of the Universidad Autónoma de Guadalajara, On March 3, 1935.

Later, in 2009, Estadio Tres de Marzo was remodeled to fit the new modern look of Estudiantes Tecos and changed the stands' colors from being yellow and red, to wine red, while also drawing out the team's logo in the middle of both the east and west sides of the main stands.

In June 2020, Jaguares de Jalisco and Halcones de Zapopan of the Liga de Balompié Mexicano moved to the stadium. Jaguares de Jalisco and UAG invested money in renovations for the stadium.

In February 2022, ahead of the 2022 LFA season, the Reyes de Jalisco of the Liga de Fútbol Americano Profesional (LFA) announced that they would play in the stadium, becoming the first professional gridiron football team to do so. In 2023 they moved to a new stadium built by the Guadalajara City Council.

In November 2025, UAG agreed to lease the stadium to OCESA, a concert promotion company, for a period of ten years. Following this agreement, reconstruction work began on the stadium to convert it into a venue primarily dedicated to concerts, forcing Tecos to relocate their home games to a field adjacent to the stadium. In April 2026, the stadium was renamed following a naming rights deal with GNP Seguros and was announced to be reopening in August. After its opening, the venue will be able to continue hosting football matches, however, these will be subject to the concert schedule to be held there.

== 1986 FIFA World Cup ==
It hosted 3 matches of the tournament.

Date	Time (UTC−6)	Team No. 1	Res.	Team No. 2	Round	Attendance
3 June 1986	12:00	Algeria	1–1	Northern Ireland	Group D	22,000
7 June 1986	12:00	Spain	2–1	Northern Ireland	Group D	28,000
11 June 1986	16:00	Morocco	3–1	Portugal	Group F	24,000

== Concerts ==
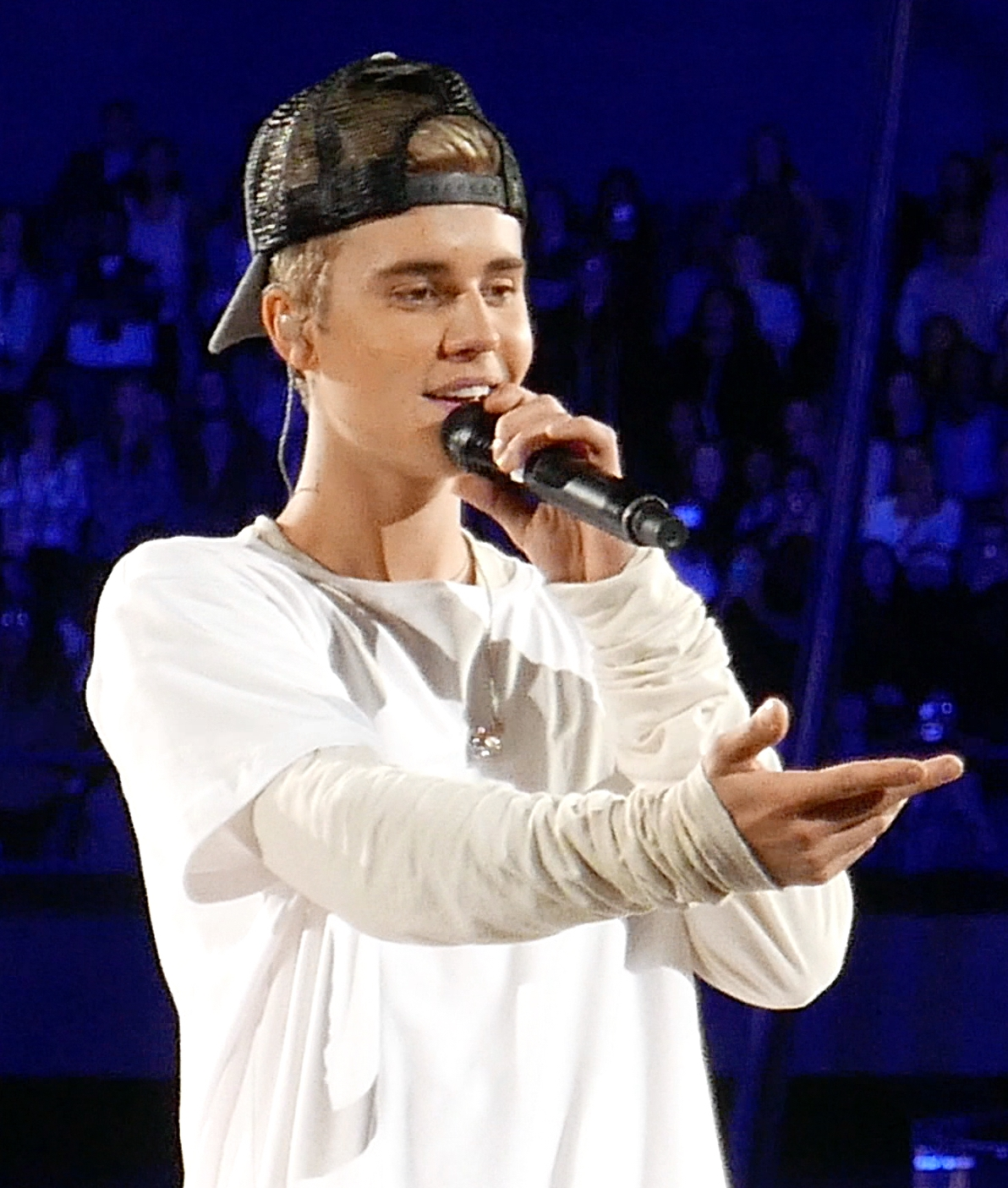
Justin Bieber performing on 28 May 2022

Date	Artist	Tour
6 May 1993	(Mexico) Luis Miguel	Aries Tour
16 November 1995	(Mexico) Luis Miguel	El Concierto Tour
27 February 2002	(Mexico) Luis Miguel	Mis Romances Tour
9 February 2003	(Colombia) Shakira	Tour of the Mongoose
18 February 2004	(Mexico) Luis Miguel	33 Tour
17 March 2004	(Spain) Alejandro Sanz	No Es Lo Mismo Tour
22 March 2006	(Mexico) Luis Miguel	México En La Piel Tour
23 March 2006	(Mexico) Luis Miguel	México En La Piel Tour
4 March 2007	(England) Roger Waters	The Dark Side of the Moon Live
12 November 2007	(Argentina) Soda Stereo	Me Verás Volver
23 February 2008	(Mexico) Maná	Amar es Combatir Tour
1 March 2010	(United States) Metallica	World Magnetic Tour
4 March 2010	(Spain) Alejandro Sanz	Paraiso Tour
9 March 2010	(United Kingdom) Coldplay	Viva la Vida Tour
6 October 2010	(United States) Black Eyed Peas	The E.N.D. World Tour
23 October 2010	(United States) Jonas Brothers	Live in Concert
5 April 2011	(Colombia) Shakira	The Sun Comes Out World Tour
3 May 2011	(United States) Lady Gaga	The Monster Ball Tour
26 October 2011	(Mexico) Maná	Drama y Luz World Tour
1 December 2011	(United States) Britney Spears	Femme Fatale Tour
12 April 2013	(United States) The Killers	Battle Born World Tour
15 June 2018	(United States) Romeo Santos	Golden Tour
14 October 2018	(Colombia) Shakira	El Dorado World Tour
1 May 2022	(United States) The Killers	Imploding the Mirage Tour
28 May 2022	(Canada) Justin Bieber	Justice World Tour
26 November 2022	(Puerto Rico) Daddy Yankee	La Última Vuelta World Tour
27 November 2022	(Puerto Rico) Daddy Yankee	La Última Vuelta World Tour
3 June 2023	(Puerto Rico) Rauw Alejandro	Saturno World Tour
20 August 2023	(United States) Lana Del Rey	
27 October 2023	(Mexico) Peso Pluma	Doble P Tour
26 November 2023	(Mexico) RBD	Soy Rebelde Tour
27 November 2023	(Mexico) RBD	Soy Rebelde Tour
23 February 2024	(Colombia) Karol G	Mañana Será Bonito Tour
24 February 2024	(Colombia) Karol G	Mañana Será Bonito Tour
3 February 2025	(United States) Linkin Park	From Zero World Tour

== Facilities ==
To account for being inside of UAG, a 4,000 vehicle parking lot is found along la Avenida de la Patria, which provides easy access to nearly the entire city of Guadalajara.

== See also ==
- Estudiantes Tecos
- List of football stadiums in Mexico
