= 33 Tour =

2003–04 concert tour by Luis Miguel

- Tour by Luis Miguel
- Associated album: 33
- Start date: October 8, 2003
- End date: October 30, 2004
- Legs: 3
- No. of shows: 64 in North America; 13 in South America; 4 in Central America; 8 in Europe; 89 total

Luis Miguel concert chronology
- Mis Romances Tour (2002); 33 Tour (2003–04); México En La Piel Tour (2005–07)

The 33 Tour was a concert tour performed by Luis Miguel during the years 2003 and 2004 to promote his last album 33. He sang 89 concerts during this tour of a duration about 95 minutes. Luis Miguel performed at Mexico's National Auditorium, as well as other prestigious international venues such as Plaza de Toros de Las Ventas in Spain and José Amalfitani Stadium in Argentina.

During this tour in Spain, the Prince Felipe of Spain presented him with a special award for being the best-selling foreign artist in the country's history, and hosted a special party in his honor in Madrid.

== History ==
To promote 33, Miguel began his 33 Tour on 8 October 2003 in Palm Desert, California. He toured throughout the United States until his final show on 17 November 2003 in Duluth, Georgia. Following his concerts in the United States, he continued the first leg of the tour in South America beginning in Chile on 27 November 2003. He concluded the first leg of his tour on 7 December 2003 in Argentina. Miguel grossed nine million dollars from his concerts in the United States.

Miguel commenced the second leg of his 33 Tour by performing 25 consecutive shows at the National Auditorium in Mexico City from 15 January 2004 to 16 February 2004, breaking the previous record held by his 21 shows during the Amarte Es Un Placer Tour in 2000. Following his performances in Mexico City, he made recitals in the country, singing in Guadalajara, Monterrey, and Tijuana. His concerts at the National Auditorium grossed over $12 million. He returned in the United States where he performed four shows.

The final leg of his 33 Tour was launched on 23 September 2004 where he performed in Spain. Following his shows in Spain, he toured in Central America performing in Guatemala, Costa Rica, El Salvador, and Panama. He then concluded his tour after presenting in Colombia, Ecuador, and Peru. The 33 Tour grossed over $29 million.

This tour finished on October 30, 2004, just 8 days before the worldwide release of his next album, Mexico En La Piel.

== Tour Set List ==
33 Tour - Leg 1: Oct/8/2003 - Mar/12/2004

33 Tour - Leg 1 October 8, 2003 – March 12, 2004
No.	Title	Original album	Length
1.	"Introduction"
2.	"Vuelve"	33
3.	"Amor, Amor, Amor"	Mis Romances
4.	"Ahora Que Te Vas"	33
5.	"Perfidia"	Mis Romances
6.	"Eres"	33
7.	"Devuélveme El Amor"	33
8.	"Medley" (Por Debajo De La Mesa / No Sé Tú / Como Duele)	Romances, Romance, Mis Romances
9.	"O Tú, O Ninguna"	Amarte Es Un Placer
10.	"Medley" (Dame Tu Amor / Sol, Arena Y Mar / Suave)	Aries, Amarte Es Un Placer
11.	"Un Te Amo"	33
12.	"Medley" (No Me Puedes Dejar Así / Palabra De Honor / Entrégate / La Incondicional)	Decídete, Palabra De Honor, 20 Años, Busca Una Mujer
13.	"Introduction [Techno]"
14.	"Con Tus Besos"	33
15.	"Nos Hizo Falta Tiempo"	33
16.	"Que Tristeza"	33
17.	"Medley" (Mucho Corazón / La Media Vuelta / Amorcito Corazón)	Romance, Segundo Romance, Mis Romances
18.	"Y Sigo (Only in Palm Desert)"	33
19.	"Medley" (Cómo Es Posible Que A Mi Lado / Será Que No Me Amas / Te Propongo Esta Noche)	Nada Es Igual, 20 Años, Amarte Es Un Placer
20.	"Medley" (Ahora Te Puedes Marchar / La Chica Del Bikini Azul / Isabel / Cuando Calienta El Sol)	Soy Como Quiero Ser, Palabra De Honor
21.	"Te Necesito"	33

33 Tour - Leg 2: Sep/23/2004 - Oct/30/2004

33 Tour - Leg 2 September 23, 2003 – October 30, 2004
No.	Title	Original album	Length
1.	"Introduction"
2.	"Vuelve"	33
3.	"Amor, Amor, Amor"	Mis Romances
4.	"Ahora Que Te Vas"	33
5.	"Perfidia"	Mis Romances
6.	"Eres"	33
7.	"Devuélveme El Amor"	33
8.	"Medley" (Por Debajo De La Mesa / No Sé Tú / Como Duele)	Romances, Romance, Mis Romances
9.	"O Tú, O Ninguna"	Amarte Es Un Placer
10.	"Medley" (Dame Tu Amor / Sol, Arena Y Mar / Suave)	Aries, Amarte Es Un Placer
11.	"Un Te Amo"	33
12.	"Medley" (No Me Puedes Dejar Asi / Palabra De Honor / Entrégate / La Incondicional)	Decídete, Palabra De Honor, 20 Años, Busca Una Mujer
13.	"Introduction [Techno]"
14.	"Con Tus Besos"	33
15.	"Somos Novios"	Segundo Romance
16.	"Nosotros"	Segundo Romance
17.	"Medley" (Mucho Corazón / La Media Vuelta / Amorcito Corazón)	Romance, Segundo Romance, Mis Romances
18.	"Medley" (Cómo Es Posible Que A Mi Lado / Será Que No Me Amas / Te Propongo Esta Noche)	Nada Es Igual, 20 Años, Amarte Es Un Placer
19.	"Medley" (Ahora Te Puedes Marchar / La Chica Del Bikini Azul / Isabel / Cuando Calienta El Sol)	Soy Como Quiero Ser, Palabra De Honor
20.	"Te Necesito"	33

== Tour dates ==
List of concerts, showing date, city, country, venue, tickets sold, number of available tickets and amount of gross revenue
Date	City	Country	Venue	Attendance	Revenue
North America - Leg 1
October 8, 2003	Palm Desert	United States	McCallum Theatre	1,022 / 1,022	$80,400
October 10, 2003	Las Vegas	United States	Mandalay Bay Events Center	5,881 / 8,289	$589,365
October 11, 2003	Santa Barbara	United States	Santa Barbara Bowl	3,455 / 4,245	$224,455
October 12, 2003	Fresno	United States	Selland Arena	—	—
October 15, 2003	Los Angeles	United States	Universal Amphitheatre	22,757 / 24,376	$2,140,190
October 16, 2003	Los Angeles	United States	Universal Amphitheatre	22,757 / 24,376	$2,140,190
October 17, 2003	Los Angeles	United States	Universal Amphitheatre	22,757 / 24,376	$2,140,190
October 18, 2003	Los Angeles	United States	Universal Amphitheatre	22,757 / 24,376	$2,140,190
October 19, 2003	Los Angeles	United States	Universal Amphitheatre	22,757 / 24,376	$2,140,190
October 22, 2003	Denver	United States	Magness Arena	—	—
October 24, 2003	San Jose	United States	HP Pavilion	—	—
October 25, 2003	Chula Vista	United States	Coors Amphitheatre	12,384 / 12,384	$690,516
October 26, 2003	Phoenix	United States	Dodge Theatre	—	—
October 27, 2003	El Paso	United States	Don Haskins Center	6,876 / 6,876	$463,416
October 29, 2003	Hidalgo	United States	Dodge Arena	9,840 / 9,840	$803,465
October 30, 2003	Hidalgo	United States	Dodge Arena	9,840 / 9,840	$803,465
November 1, 2003	Dallas	United States	Smirnoff Music Centre	5,610 / 6,200	$343,856
November 2, 2003	San Antonio	United States	SBC Center	7,072 / 12,412	$424,000
November 4, 2003	Laredo	United States	Laredo Entertainment Center	9,322 / 9,322	$707,605
November 5, 2003	Houston	United States	Toyota Center	9,105 / 11,674	$556,045
November 8, 2003	Chicago	United States	United Center	9,224 / 12,500	$737,175
November 11, 2003	New York City	United States	Madison Square Garden	12,123 / 13,102	$982,334
November 13, 2003	Miami	United States	American Airlines Arena	16,601 / 22,000 (Note: The score data is combined from the shows held at the American Airlines Arena November 13 and November 15, 2003, respectively.)	$1,252,133
November 14, 2003	Tampa	United States	St. Pete Times Forum	4,035 / 9,007	$238,183
November 15, 2003	Miami	United States	American Airlines Arena	—	—
November 17, 2003	Duluth	United States	Gwinnett Convention Center	4,824 / 6,200	$402,400
South America
November 26, 2003	Santiago	Chile	Espacio Riesco	—	—
November 28, 2003 (Note: The November 28, 2003 in Santiago was originally scheduled to take place on November 27, but was postponed for next day due to production problems.)	Santiago	Chile	Estadio San Carlos de Apoquindo	—	—
November 29, 2003	Viña del Mar	Chile	Quinta Vergara Amphitheater	—	—
December 3, 2003	Córdoba	Argentina	Estadio Chateau Carrera	—	—
December 5, 2003	Buenos Aires	Argentina	José Amalfitani Stadium	—	—
December 6, 2003	Buenos Aires	Argentina	José Amalfitani Stadium	—	—
December 7, 2003	Buenos Aires	Argentina	José Amalfitani Stadium	—	—
North America II - Leg 2
January 15, 2004	Mexico City	Mexico	National Auditorium	233,913 / 242,075	$11,964,429
January 16, 2004	Mexico City	Mexico	National Auditorium	233,913 / 242,075	$11,964,429
January 17, 2004	Mexico City	Mexico	National Auditorium	233,913 / 242,075	$11,964,429
January 18, 2004	Mexico City	Mexico	National Auditorium	233,913 / 242,075	$11,964,429
January 21, 2004	Mexico City	Mexico	National Auditorium	233,913 / 242,075	$11,964,429
January 22, 2004	Mexico City	Mexico	National Auditorium	233,913 / 242,075	$11,964,429
January 23, 2004	Mexico City	Mexico	National Auditorium	233,913 / 242,075	$11,964,429
January 24, 2004	Mexico City	Mexico	National Auditorium	233,913 / 242,075	$11,964,429
January 25, 2004	Mexico City	Mexico	National Auditorium	233,913 / 242,075	$11,964,429
January 28, 2004	Mexico City	Mexico	National Auditorium	233,913 / 242,075	$11,964,429
January 29, 2004	Mexico City	Mexico	National Auditorium	233,913 / 242,075	$11,964,429
January 30, 2004	Mexico City	Mexico	National Auditorium	233,913 / 242,075	$11,964,429
January 31, 2004	Mexico City	Mexico	National Auditorium	233,913 / 242,075	$11,964,429
February 1, 2004	Mexico City	Mexico	National Auditorium	233,913 / 242,075	$11,964,429
February 4, 2004	Mexico City	Mexico	National Auditorium	233,913 / 242,075	$11,964,429
February 5, 2004	Mexico City	Mexico	National Auditorium	233,913 / 242,075	$11,964,429
February 6, 2004	Mexico City	Mexico	National Auditorium	233,913 / 242,075	$11,964,429
February 7, 2004	Mexico City	Mexico	National Auditorium	233,913 / 242,075	$11,964,429
February 8, 2004	Mexico City	Mexico	National Auditorium	233,913 / 242,075	$11,964,429
February 11, 2004	Mexico City	Mexico	National Auditorium	233,913 / 242,075	$11,964,429
February 12, 2004	Mexico City	Mexico	National Auditorium	233,913 / 242,075	$11,964,429
February 13, 2004	Mexico City	Mexico	National Auditorium	233,913 / 242,075	$11,964,429
February 14, 2004	Mexico City	Mexico	National Auditorium	233,913 / 242,075	$11,964,429
February 15, 2004	Mexico City	Mexico	National Auditorium	233,913 / 242,075	$11,964,429
February 16, 2004	Mexico City	Mexico	National Auditorium	233,913 / 242,075	$11,964,429
February 18, 2004	Guadalajara	Mexico	Estadio Tres de Marzo	22,479 / 26,488	$1,245,085
February 20, 2004	Monterrey	Mexico	Monterrey Arena	37,418 / 41,144	$2,605,195
February 21, 2004	Monterrey	Mexico	Monterrey Arena	37,418 / 41,144	$2,605,195
February 22, 2004	Monterrey	Mexico	Monterrey Arena	37,418 / 41,144	$2,605,195
February 23, 2004	Monterrey	Mexico	Monterrey Arena	37,418 / 41,144	$2,605,195
February 27, 2004	Tijuana	Mexico	El Foro	—	—
February 28, 2004	Tijuana	Mexico	El Foro	—	—
February 29, 2004	Tijuana	Mexico	El Foro	—	—
March 4, 2004	Anaheim	United States	Arrowhead Pond	8,296 / 11,239	$606,955
March 5, 2004	Tucson	United States	TCC Arena	5,189 / 5,395	$407,852
March 6, 2004	Las Vegas	United States	PH Entertainment Center	—	—
March 7, 2004	San Diego	United States	Cox Arena	8,574 / 8,574	$606,765
March 12, 2004	Veracruz	Mexico	World Trade Center	—	—
Europe - Leg 3
September 23, 2004	Santiago de Compostela	Spain	Pavillón Multiusos Fontes do Sar	—	—
September 25, 2004	Jaén	Spain	Pabellon Del Nuevo Recinto Ferial	—	—
September 26, 2004	Valencia	Spain	Plaza Monumental	—	—
September 28, 2004	Madrid	Spain	Plaza De Toros Las Ventas	11,672	€503,090
September 29, 2004	Madrid	Spain	Plaza De Toros Las Ventas	12,498	€533,608
October 1, 2004	Alicante	Spain	Ciudad Deportiva	12,296	€404,464
October 2, 2004	Barcelona	Spain	Palau Sant Jordi	16,909	€684,622
October 3, 2004	Zaragoza	Spain	Plaza De Toros	—	—
Central America
October 8, 2004	Guatemala City	Guatemala	Estadio Mateo Flores	—	—
October 10, 2004	San Salvador	El Salvador	Estadio Jorge "Mágico" González	—	—
October 13, 2004	San José	Costa Rica	Estadio Ricardo Saprissa	15,963 / 16,201	$572,854
October 15, 2004	Panama City	Panama	Figali Convention Center	4,317 / 7,569	$371,917
South America II
October 17, 2004	Cali	Colombia	Estadio Pascual Guerrero	—	—
October 20, 2004	Bogotá	Colombia	Estadio Nemesio Camacho	—	—
October 23, 2004	Medellín	Colombia	Estadio Atanasio Girardot	—	—
October 26, 2004	Guayaquil	Ecuador	Estadio Alberto Spencer	—	—
October 28, 2004	Quito	Ecuador	Estadio Olímpico Atahualpa	—	—
October 30, 2004	Lima	Peru	Explanada Estadio Monumental	—	—
Total				476,280 / 528,134 (90,2%)	$29,016,590

== Cancelled shows ==
List of cancelled concerts, showing date, city, country, venue, and reason for cancellation
Date	City	Country	Venue	Reason
November 7, 2003	Cleveland	United States	Public Auditorium	Unknown

== Tour Personnel ==
=== Band ===
- Vocals: Luis Miguel
- Acoustic & electric guitar: Todd Robinson
- Bass: Lalo Carrillo
- Piano: Francisco Loyo
- Keyboards: Arturo Pérez
- Drums: Victor Loyo
- Percussion: Tommy Aros
- Saxophone: Jeff Nathanson
- Trumpet: Francisco Abonce
- Trombone: Alejandro Carballo
- Backing Vocals: Unique & Shanna
