= List of number-one albums of 2002 (Spain) =

The List of number-one albums of 2002 in Spain is derived from the Top 100 España record chart published weekly by PROMUSICAE (Productores de Música de España), a non-profit organization composed by Spain and multinational record companies. This association tracks record sales (physical and digital) in Spain.

== Albums ==
Week	Chart Date	Album	Artist	Reference
1	January 7	El Album	Operación Triunfo	
2	January 14	Singles Gala 9	Operación Triunfo	
3	January 21	Singles Gala 10	Operación Triunfo	
4	January 28	Singles Gala 11	Operación Triunfo	
5	February 4	Singles Gala 12	Operación Triunfo	
6	February 11	Operación Triunfo Canta Disney	Operación Triunfo	
7	February 18	Operación Triunfo Canta Disney	Operación Triunfo	
8	February 25	Gala Eurovisión	Operación Triunfo	
9	March 4	Gala Eurovisión	Operación Triunfo	
10	March 11	Gala Eurovisión	Operación Triunfo	
11	March 18	Gala Eurovisión	Operación Triunfo	
12	March 25	Gala Eurovisión	Operación Triunfo	
13	April 1	Gala Eurovisión	Operación Triunfo	
14	April 8	Grandes Éxitos	Chayanne	
15	April 15	Brisa de Esperanza	Nuria Fergó	
16	April 22	Manu Tenorio	Manu Tenorio	
17	April 29	Rosa	Rosa	
18	May 6	Manu Tenorio	Manu Tenorio	
19	May 13	Manu Tenorio	Manu Tenorio	
20	May 20	Bustamante	Bustamante	
21	May 27	Bustamante	Bustamante	
22	June 3	Corazón Latino	David Bisbal	
23	June 10	Corazón Latino	David Bisbal	
24	June 17	Corazón Latino	David Bisbal	
25	June 24	Corazón Latino	David Bisbal	
26	July 1	Corazón Latino	David Bisbal	
27	July 8	Corazón Latino	David Bisbal	
28	July 15	Corazón Latino	David Bisbal	
29	July 22	Corazón Latino	David Bisbal	
30	July 29	The Rising	Bruce Springsteen	
31	August 5	¿Qué Pides Tú?	Alex Ubago	
32	August 12	¿Qué Pides Tú?	Alex Ubago	
33	August 19	Revolución de Amor	'Maná	
34	August 26	Revolución de Amor	'Maná	
35	September 2	Revolución de Amor	'Maná	
36	September 9	Revolución de Amor	'Maná	
37	September 16	Quizás	Enrique Iglesias	
38	September 23	Elvis 30#1 Hits	Elvis Presley	
39	September 30	Elvis 30#1 Hits	Elvis Presley	
40	October 7	Versos en la Boca	Joan Manuel Serrat	
41	October 14	Mis Boleros Favoritos	Luis Miguel	
42	October 21	Gala 1	Operación Triunfo II	
43	October 28	Dímelo en la calle	Joaquín Sabina	
44	November 4	The Best of 1990-2000	U2	
45	November 11	Dímelo en la calle	Joaquín Sabina	
46	November 18	Gala 5	Operación Triunfo II	
47	November 25	Un Paso Adelante	UPA Dance	
48	December 2	Un Paso Adelante	UPA Dance	
49	December 9	La Fuerza de la Vida	Operación Triunfo II	
50	December 16	La Fuerza de la Vida	Operación Triunfo II	
51	December 23	Un Paso Adelante	UPA Dance	
52	December 30	Un Paso Adelante	UPA Dance	

== See also ==
- List of number-one singles of 2002 (Spain)
