= List of number-one albums of 2003 (Spain) =

The List of number-one albums of 2003 in Spain is derived from the Top 100 España record chart published weekly by PROMUSICAE (Productores de Música de España), a non-profit organization composed by Spain and multinational record companies. This association tracks record sales (physical and digital) in Spain.

== Albums ==
Week	Chart Date	Album	Artist	Reference
1	January 4	Un Paso Adelante	UPA Dance	
2	January 11	Un Paso Adelante	UPA Dance	
3	January 18	OT II Gala 11	Operación Triunfo II	
4	January 25	OT II Gala 12	Operación Triunfo II	
5	February 1	OT II Gala 13	Operación Triunfo II	
6	February 8	Por Siempre Tú y Yo	Camela	
7	February 15	Generación OT Juntos	Operación Triunfo I y II	
8	February 22	Generación OT Juntos	Operación Triunfo I y II	
9	March 1	Generación OT Juntos	Operación Triunfo I y II	
10	March 8	Generación OT Juntos	Operación Triunfo I y II	
11	March 15	Generación OT Juntos	Operación Triunfo I y II	
12	March 22	Generación OT Juntos	Operación Triunfo I y II	
13	March 29	Meteora	Linkin Park	
14	April 5	Generación OT Juntos	Operación Triunfo I y II	
15	April 12	Abrázame	Tamara	
16	April 19	Generación OT Juntos	Operación Triunfo I y II	
17	April 26	Otra Realidad	Beth	
18	May 3	Lo que te conté mientras te hacías la dormida	La Oreja de Van Gogh	
19	May 10	Lo que te conté mientras te hacías la dormida	La Oreja de Van Gogh	
20	May 17	Lo que te conté mientras te hacías la dormida	La Oreja de Van Gogh	
21	May 24	Lo que te conté mientras te hacías la dormida	La Oreja de Van Gogh	
22	May 31	Lo que te conté mientras te hacías la dormida	La Oreja de Van Gogh	
23	June 7	Lo que te conté mientras te hacías la dormida	La Oreja de Van Gogh	
24	June 14	Caribe Mix 2003	Various Artists	
25	June 21	Caribe Mix 2003	Various Artists	
26	June 28	Caribe Mix 2003	Various Artists	
27	July 5	Caribe Mix 2003	Various Artists	
28	July 12	Caribe Mix 2003	Various Artists	
29	July 19	Caribe Mix 2003	Various Artists	
30	July 26	Caribe Mix 2003	Various Artists	
31	August 2	Caribe Mix 2003	Various Artists	
32	August 9	Caribe Mix 2003	Various Artists	
33	August 16	Caribe Mix 2003	Various Artists	
34	August 23	Caribe Mix 2003	Various Artists	
35	August 30	Blanco Añil	Manu Tenorio	
36	September 6	No Es lo Mismo	Alejandro Sanz	
37	September 13	No Es lo Mismo	Alejandro Sanz	
38	September 20	No Es lo Mismo	Alejandro Sanz	
39	September 27	No Es lo Mismo	Alejandro Sanz	
40	October 4	33	Luis Miguel	
41	October 11	33	Luis Miguel	
42	October 18	33	Luis Miguel	
43	October 25	Soy Mujer	Chenoa	
44	November 1	Ahora	Rosa	
45	November 8	Ahora	Rosa	
46	November 15	Tengo	Queco	
47	November 22	Eurojunior Festival	Varios Artistas	
48	November 29	Fantasía o Realidad	Alex Ubago	
49	December 6	Así Soy Yo	Bustamante	
50	December 13	Fantasía o Realidad	Alex Ubago	
51	December 20	Eurojunior Festival	Varios Artistas	
52	December 27	Eurojunior Festival	Varios Artistas	

== See also ==
- List of number-one singles of 2003 (Spain)
