= Mis Boleros Favoritos =

Compilation album by Luis Miguel
- Released: 8 October 2002
- Recorded: 1991–2002
- Studios: Record Plant (Hollywood)
- Genre: Bolero
- Length: 47:47
- Language: Spanish
- Label: Warner Music Latina
- Producer: Luis Miguel

Luis Miguel chronology
Mis Romances (2001)	Mis Boleros Favoritos (2002)	33 (2003)

Luis Miguel video chronology
Vivo (2000)	Mis Boleros Favoritos (2002)	México en la Piel: Edicion Diamante (2005)

Alternative cover

Singles from Mis Boleros Favoritos
- 1. "Hasta Que Vuelvas" Released: 3 October 2002

Mis Boleros Favoritos (English: My Favorite Boleros) is a compilation album by Mexican singer Luis Miguel. Released on 8 October 2002 by Warner Music Latina, it contains thirteen previously recorded songs from the Romance-themed albums as well as a new track "Hasta Que Vuelvas". A special edition of the record was released on the same day and includes a DVD containing seven music videos from the bolero-themed discs. "Hasta Que Vuelvas" was released as a single for the album and peaked at number 16 on Billboard's Hot Latin Songs chart in the United States. Iván Adaime of AllMusic gave the album a 3.5 out of 5 star rating citing that the new song and music videos are the only incentives for fans to buy it and noted the album's purpose to end the Romance era. "Hasta Que Vuelvas" received a Latin Grammy nomination for Record of the Year in 2003. Commercially, Mis Boleros Favoritos peaked at number three on Billboard's Top Latin Albums chart in the United States, number one in Spain, and number seven in Argentina.

== Background and content ==
In 2001, Luis Miguel released Mis Romances, the fourth album in the Romance series in which Miguel covers Latin American boleros. The record was met with unfavorable reviews by music critics and was a commercial flop. On 20 September 2002, Miguel announced that he would release a compilation album featuring previously recorded boleros from the Romance series. The record also features a new track, "Hasta Que Vuelvas", originally composed by Mario Arturo Ramos; it was arranged by Bebu Silvetti and Juan Carlos Calderón. Miguel dedicated the song to his mother Marcela Basteri who disappeared in 1986 and mentioned that it was originally considered for inclusion on Mis Romances. "Hasta Que Vuelvas" was released as a single on 3 October and peaked at number 16 on the Billboard Hot Latin Songs chart in the United States. Mis Boleros Favoritos was released on 8 October 2002 and a special edition of the disc includes a DVD which contains seven music videos from the Romance series.

== Reception ==
AllMusic critic Iván Adaime rated Mis Boleros Favoritos 3.5 out of 5 stars highlighting songs such as "No Sé Tú", and "Somos Novios" as several of the "greatest hits in Spanish, in any genre". He also noted that the album serves to "close this era" of the bolero records and stated that the inclusion of "Hasta Que Vuelvas" and the music videos are the only incentives for "any die-hard fan". "Hasta Que Vuelvas" was nominated in the category of Record of the Year at the 4th Annual Latin Grammy Awards in 2003. In the United States, Mis Boleros Favoritos debuted and peaked at number three on the Billboard Top Latin Albums and was certified double Platinum in the Latin field by the Recording Industry Association of America for shipping 200,000 copies. In Spain, the disc debuted on the top of the Spanish Albums Chart and received a Platinum certification in the country for shipments of 100,000 copies. In Argentina, it peaked at number seven on the Argentine Albums Chart and the DVD was certified Platinum for shipping 8,000 copies.

== Track listing ==
No.	Title	Writer(s)	Length
1.	"No Me Platiques Más" (from Romance, 1991)	Vicente Garrido	3:33
2.	"La Barca" (from Romance, 1991)	Roberto Cantoral	3:29
3.	"La Gloria Eres Tú" (from Romances, 1997)	José Antonio Méndez	3:22
4.	"No Sé Tú" (from Romance, 1991)	Armando Manzanero	3:49
5.	"Historia de un Amor" (from Segundo Romance, 1994)	Carlos Almarán	3:54
6.	"Somos Novios" (from Segundo Romance, 1994)	Manzanero	3:11
7.	"Solamente una Vez" (from Segundo Romance, 1994)	Agustín Lara	3:01
8.	"El Día Que Me Quieras" (from Segundo Romance, 1994)	Alfredo Le Pera; Carlos Gardel	4:01
9.	"El Reloj" (from Romances, 1997)	Cantoral	3:02
10.	"Por Debajo de la Mesa" (from Romances, 1997)	Manzanero	3:03
11.	"Encadenados" (from Romances, 1997)	Carlos Arturo Briz	3:59
12.	"Sabor a Mí" (from Romances, 1997)	Álvaro Carrillo	3:05
13.	"Perfidia" (from Mis Romances, 2001)	Alberto Domínguez	3:26
14.	"Hasta Que Vuelvas" (Previously unreleased)	Mario Arturo Ramos	3:32

DVD
No.	Title	Writer(s)	Director	Length
1.	"No Sé Tú"	Manzanero	Pedro Torres
2.	"Contigo en la Distancia"	César Portillo de la Luz	Torres
3.	"Delirio"	Portillo de la Luz	Carlos Somonte
4.	"La Media Vuelta"	José Alfredo Jiménez	Torres
5.	"El Día Que Me Quieras"	Le Pera; Gardel	Kiko Guerrero
6.	"Por Debajo de la Mesa"	Manzanero	Daniela Federici
7.	"Amor, Amor, Amor"	Ricardo López Méndez; Gabriel Ruiz	Rebecca Blake

== Charts ==
=== Weekly charts ===
Chart (2002)	Peak position
Argentina (CAPIF)	7
European Albums (Music & Media)	36
Spain (PROMUSICAE)	1
US Billboard 200	125
US Top Latin Albums (Billboard)	3
US Latin Pop Albums (Billboard)	3

=== Monthly charts ===
Chart (2002)	Peak position
Argentina (CAPIF)	10

=== Year-end charts ===
Chart (2002)	Peak position
US Top Latin Albums (Billboard)	58

Chart (2003)	Peak position
US Top Latin Albums (Billboard)	35
US Latin Pop Albums (Billboard)	15

== Certifications ==
Region	Certification	Certified units/sales
Argentina (CAPIF)	Platinum	40,000^{^}
Argentina (CAPIF) for the DVD	Platinum	8,000^{^}
Chile	Platinum	20,000
Mexico First-day sales	—	125,000
Spain (Promusicae)	2× Platinum	200,000^{^}
United States (RIAA)	2× Platinum (Latin)	200,000^{^}
Summaries
Worldwide	—	1,000,000
^{^} Shipments figures based on certification alone.

== Personnel ==
Adapted from the Mis Boleros Favoritos liner notes:

Hasta Que Vuelvas

- Alfredo Mathus – guitar recording engineer
- Luis Miguel – producer, vocals
- Rafa Sardina – voice recording engineer
- Al Schmidt – audio mixing
- Al Schmitt – string recording engineer
- Bebu Silvetti – arranger, music director

== See also ==
- 2002 in Latin music
- List of number-one albums of 2002 (Spain)
