= Ya nunca más =

Ya nunca más may refer to:

- Ya nunca más (film), a 1984 Mexican musical film
- Ya nunca más (album), the soundtrack album for the film
