= 33 (Luis Miguel album) =

Studio album by Luis Miguel
- Released: 30 September 2003
- Studios: Record Plant; Ocean Way Recording; Conway Recording Studios (Hollywood, California)
- Genre: Pop
- Length: 41:55
- Label: Warner Music Latina
- Producer: Luis Miguel

Luis Miguel chronology
Mis Boleros Favoritos (2002)	33 (2003)	México en la Piel (2004)

Singles from 33
- 1. "Te Necesito" Released: 3 September 2003; 2. "Un Te Amo" Released: 19 November 2003

33 is the fifteenth studio album by Mexican singer Luis Miguel. It was released through Warner Music Latina on 30 September 2003. It is a pop record which contains pop ballads and uptempo disco numbers. The album was produced by Miguel and recorded in Hollywood, California. 33 was promoted by two singles: "Te Necesito" and "Un Te Amo". It was also promoted by a tour which lasted from 2003 to 2004. Several songwriters including Armando Manzanero, Juan Luis Guerra, and Kike Santander contributed to the compositions in the record.

33 was met with unfavorable reviews by some music critics for having similar music styles to Miguel's previous pop records. 33 received a Grammy nomination for Best Latin Pop Album and a Latin Grammy nomination for Best Male Pop Vocal Album. The record reached number one in Argentina, Spain, and the Billboard Top Latin Albums chart in the United States. By 2004, it had sold more than 2.5 million copies.

== Background ==
In 2002, Luis Miguel released Mis Boleros Favoritos, a compilation album featuring boleros from the Romance series. He held a press conference in October 2002 in Spain to promote the album. During the conference, Miguel mentioned that his next studio album would be a pop record and would feature original songs. He also expressed interest in combining pop and bolero for his next project. Miguel had begun enlisting composers for the new album on the previous month. The album's title, 33, was announced on 3 September 2003. Regarding the album's title, Miguel commented: "It is a very personal reflection of me and a way to share it with my fans. It is the demonstration of a different era of my life and it is to inform what someone with this age may be going through." It was recorded in Hollywood, California and produced by Miguel.

== Composition ==
33 is a pop album with musical styles similar to his previous records Aries (1993) and Amarte Es un Placer (1999). Of the eleven tracks on the record, six are pop ballads and five are uptempo numbers. Miguel enlisted the help of songwriters such as Armando Manzanero, Kike Santander and Juan Luis Guerra with several of the compositions in the album. Manzanero composed three ballads for the record: "Un Te Amo", "Nos Hizo Falta Tiempo", and "Ahora Que Te Vas". Miguel also covers Manzanero's "Que Tristeza". On "Un Te Amo", the protagonist appreciates the "small blessings" from his lover. "Ahora Que Te Vas" involves the singer coping with a missed opportunity and having to come to terms with loss. Santander composed two songs: "Y Sigo" and "Devuélveme el Amor". "Y Sigo" is an uptempo number which "contrasts with the song's lyrics of lost love" while "Devuélveme el Amor" has the singer visit "his old friends solitude and desperation".

"Con Tus Besos" is a 1970s-influenced "R&B-tinged, tropical-disco number" with horns on the background. "Eres" and "Vuelve" are uptempo tunes with the same musical style as well. "Te Necesito", composed by Guerra, is a "bouncy, airy pop" song with "finger-snapping beats" and vocals backed by Take 6. The album closes with the ballad "Que Hacer".

== Promotion ==
=== Singles ===
"Te Necesito" was released as the album's first single on 3 September 2003; it reached on the top of Billboard's Hot Latin Songs chart in the United States. The music video for "Te Necesito" was filmed in Pasadena, California and directed by Daniela Federici. The album's second single, "Un Te Amo", was released on 19 November 2003, and peaked at number 30 on the Hot Latin Songs chart. "Vuelve" was released as a promo single in Mexico in 2003.

=== Tour ===
To promote 33, Miguel began his 33 Tour on 8 October 2003 in Palm Desert, California. He toured throughout the United States until his final show on 17 November 2003 in Duluth, Georgia. Following his concerts in the United States, he continued the first leg of the tour in South America beginning in Chile on 27 November 2003. He concluded the first leg of his tour on 7 December 2003 in Argentina. Miguel grossed nine million dollars from his concerts in the United States.

Miguel commenced the second leg of his 33 Tour by performing 25 consecutive shows at the National Auditorium in Mexico City from 15 January 2004 to 16 February 2004, breaking the previous record held by his 21 shows during the Amarte Es Un Placer Tour in 2000. Following his performances in Mexico City, he made recitals in the country, singing in Guadalajara, Monterrey, and Tijuana. His concerts at the National Auditorium grossed over $12 million. He returned in the United States where he performed four shows.

The final leg of his 33 Tour was launched on 23 September 2004 where he performed in Spain. Following his shows in Spain, he toured in Central America performing in Guatemala, Costa Rica, El Salvador, and Panama. He then concluded his tour after presenting in Colombia, Ecuador, and Peru. The 33 Tour grossed over $29 million.

== Critical reception and accolades ==
Professional ratings
Review scores
Source	Rating
AllMusic	4/5 stars
Chicago Sun-Times	2.5/4 stars
San Antonio Express-News	3/4 stars
The San Diego Union-Tribune	2.5/4 stars

An editor for AllMusic rated 33 four-out-of-five stars noting the uptempo songs projected "images of a Spanish Solid Gold-like variety show" and felt that Miguel "delivers" on ballads "Nos Hizo Falta Tiempo," "Ahora Que Te Vas," and "Que Hacer" as examples. The Chicago Sun-Times critic Laura Emerick gave the album 2.5-out-four stars commenting that while Manzanero "drafted some dropdead gorgeous stunners" ballads, she mentioned that they are "smothered under the usual blanket of heavy strings and synthesizers". Alejandro Riera of the Chicago Tribune called 33 Miguel's "weakest album". He panned the album's arrangements as "cheesy, awkward and tedious" and felt they drown the "sincerity" of the lyrics in the record.

The Dallas Morning News critic Mario Tarradell gave the record a "C" rating for having similar arrangements to Miguel's previous pop albums. Tarradell compared "Con Tus Besos" to "Suave" from Aries and "Sol, Arena y Mar" from Amarte Es un Placer (1999) with its "same horns, percussion and soaring chorus". He also regarded the ballads as "all identical". Hiram Soto of The San Diego Union-Tribune rated the album 2.5-out-of-four stars and stated that 33 "re-emphasizes the singer's limitations of recording either pop or boleros" and called it a "safe bet". He praised "Te Necesito" as the record's best track and complimented Santander's composition of "Y Sigo" as "memorable", but found the arrangements of "Ahora Que Te Vas" and "Que Tristeza" to be "sickly". San Antonio Express-News reviewer Ramiro Burr gave the album three-out-of-four stars and praised the production on the record and Miguel's vocals. He called "Un Te Amo" "classy", "Te Necesito" a "dance fun" number, and complimented the "energetic singalong choruses" on "Con Tus Besos".

At the 46th Annual Grammy Awards in 2004, 33 received a Grammy nomination for Best Latin Pop Album which was awarded to No Es lo Mismo by Alejandro Sanz. At the 5th Annual Latin Grammy Awards in the same year, it was nominated for Best Male Pop Vocal Album, which was also given to No Es lo Mismo. It was also nominated for Latin Pop Album of the Year by a Male Artist at the 2004 Billboard Latin Music Awards, but lost to Almas del Silencio by Ricky Martin.

== Commercial performance ==
In the United States, 33 debuted on the top of the Billboard Top Latin Albums chart on the week of 18 October 2003; it spent three weeks in this position. It also peaked at number 43 on the Billboard 200 chart and topped the Latin Pop Albums chart. The album was certified double platinum in the Latin field by the Recording Industry Association of America for shipping 200,000 units. 33 was the bestselling album of 2003 in Mexico and was certified quintuple platinum by AMPROFON for shipping 500,000 copies. 33 reached number one on the Argentine and Spanish albums chart and was certified double platinum in both countries. The record was also certified double platinum in Chile for shipping 40,000 copies. By 2004, 33 has sold more than 2.5 million copies.

== Track listing ==
No.	Title	Writer(s)	Length
1.	"Un Te Amo"	Armando Manzanero	4:04
2.	"Con Tus Besos"	Luis Miguel; Salo Loyo; Francisco Loyo	3:12
3.	"Devuélveme El Amor"	Miguel; Kike Santander	4:06
4.	"Te Necesito"	Juan Luis Guerra	3:15
5.	"Nos Hizo Falta Tiempo"	Manzanero	3:44
6.	"Eres"	Miguel; Edgar Cortázar; S. Loyo; F. Loyo	4:18
7.	"Ahora Que Te Vas"	Manzanero	4:02
8.	"Qué Tristeza"	Manzanero	3:42
9.	"Y Sigo"	Santander	3:30
10.	"Vuelve"	Alejandro Asensi; Cortázar; Miguel; F. Loyo	3:34
11.	"Qué Hacer"	Edgar Cortázar; Miguel; Ernesto Cortázar	4:28

== Personnel ==
Adapted from AllMusic:

=== Performance credits ===
- Ismael Alderette – arranger
- Tom Aros – percussion
- Robbie Buchanan – arranger, choir arrangement, electric piano
- Paul Buckmaster – choir arrangement
- Luis Carrillo – bajo sexto
- Michel Colombier – choir arrangement
- Joel Derouin – concertmaster
- Stephen Dorff – choir arrangement
- Bruce Dukov – concertmaster
- Nathan East – bajo sexto
- Gary Grant – brass
- Jerry Hey – arrangements, brass
- Dan Higgens – brass
- Paul Jackson Jr. – guitar
- Natisse Bambi Jones – chorus
- Randy Kerber – arranger, piano, electric piano
- Michael Landau – guitar
- Francisco Loyo – arranger, keyboards, piano, electric piano, soloist, synthesizer
- Victor Loyo – drums
- Luis Miguel – arranger, vocalist, producer
- Ralph Morrison III – concertmaster
- Carlos Murguía – chorus
- Jeff Nathanson – saxophone
- Kenny O'Brien – chorus
- Tim Pierce – guitar
- Dave Reitzas – mixing
- John "J.R." Robinson – drums
- Todd Robinson – guitar, electric guitar
- Leland Sklar – bajo sexto
- Ramón Stagnaro – acoustic guitar
- Take 6 – chorus ("Te Necesito")
- Michael Hart Thompson – guitar
- Giselda Vatchky – chorus
- Wil Wheaton – chorus
- Terry Wood – chorus
- Reginald Young – brass

=== Technical credits ===
- Alejandro Asensi – executive producer
- Moogie Canazio – engineer
- Ron McMaster – mastering
- Andrew McPherson – photography
- Dave Reitzas – mixing
- Rafa Sardina – mixing
- Shari Sutcliffe – production coordination

== Charts ==
=== Weekly charts ===
Chart (2003)	Peak position
Argentina (CAPIF)	1
Spain (PROMUSICAE)	1
US Billboard 200	43
US Top Latin Albums (Billboard)	1
US Latin Pop Albums (Billboard)	1

=== Year-end charts ===
Chart (2003)	Peak position
Argentina (CAPIF)	2
Spain (PROMUSICAE)	11
US Top Latin Albums (Billboard)	21
US Latin Pop Albums (Billboard)	11

== Certifications ==
Region	Certification	Certified units/sales
Argentina (CAPIF)	2× Platinum	80,000^{^}
Chile (IFPI)	2× Platinum	50,000
Mexico (AMPROFON)	5× Platinum	500,000^{^}
Spain (Promusicae)	2× Platinum	200,000^{^}
United States (RIAA)	2× Platinum (Latin)	200,000^{^}
^{^} Shipments figures based on certification alone.

== See also ==
- 2003 in Latin music
- List of number-one albums of 2003 (Spain)
- List of number-one Billboard Top Latin Albums of 2003
- List of best-selling Latin albums
