= Mis Romances =

Studio album by Luis Miguel
- Released: 20 November 2001
- Studios: Cello Studios (Hollywood, California); Record Plant (Los Angeles, California); Abbey Road Studios (London, England)
- Genre: Bolero
- Length: 38:55
- Language: Spanish
- Label: Warner Music Latina
- Producer: Luis Miguel

Luis Miguel chronology
Vivo (2000)	Mis Romances (2001)	Mis Boleros Favoritos (2002)

Singles from Mis Romances
- 1. "Amor, Amor, Amor" Released: 1 October 2001; 2. "Cómo Duele" Released: February 2002; 3. "Al Que Me Siga" Released: 2002

Mis Romances (English: My Romances) is the fourteenth studio album of Mexican singer Luis Miguel, released on 20 November 2001 by Warner Music Latina. It is the fourth album in the Romance series wherein Luis Miguel covers bolero standards from Latin America and includes two original compositions. Produced by Luis Miguel, the album was recorded at the Record Plant in Los Angeles, California with the participation of the Royal Philharmonic Orchestra at the Abbey Road Studios in London, England. The recording was promoted by three singles: "Amor, Amor, Amor", "Cómo Duele", and "Al Que Me Siga". It was further promoted by a tour in 2002 that had Luis Miguel performing in the United States, Latin America, and Spain. It was the highest-grossing tour of the year by a Latin artist in the U.S.

Mis Romances was met with unfavorable reviews from critics who felt the record was too similar to its predecessors and lambasted Luis Miguel for not evolving his artistic style. Commercially, it peaked at number two on Billboard's Top Latin Albums and was the second bestselling Latin album of 2002 in the United States. Additionally, it reached number one in Argentina and was the bestselling record of the year in Mexico. Within nine days of its release. Mis Romances sold over 1.5 million copies, but failed to meet the record label's expectations. The album also won the Billboard Latin Music Award for "Latin Pop Album of the Year by a Male Artist" and "Album of the Year" at the 2002 Premio de la Gente.

== Background ==
In 1991, Luis Miguel released his eighth studio album, Romance, a collection of classic boleros, the oldest dating to the 1940s. The record was Produced by Armando Manzanero and arranged by Bebu Silvetti, and was a success in Latin America and sold over seven million copies worldwide. It revived interest in the bolero genre, and was the first recording by a Spanish-speaking artist to be certified Gold in Brazil, Taiwan and the United States. It received a Grammy nomination for Best Latin Pop Album. Its follow-up, Segundo Romance, was issued in 1994; Manzanero, Juan Carlos Calderón and Kiko Cibrian co-produced the disc with Luis Miguel, winning a Grammy Award for Best Latin Pop Performance. In 1997, Romances was launched, with Luis Miguel and Manzanero co-producing Silvetti's arrangements; it sold over 4.5 million copies, winning another Grammy for Best Latin Pop Performance.

By the time of Romances release, some music journalists felt that the bolero albums were becoming formulaic. Achy Obejas of the Chicago Tribune wondered how long Luis Miguel "can dig into the oldies bag and come up with a credible record" as she felt that he was beginning to "slip" in the disc. Similarly, The San Diego Union-Tribune music critic Ernesto Portillo Jr., while giving Romances a positive review, questioned the need for a third album in the Romance series as he felt it "diminishes the specialness" of Romance and Segundo Romance. After Romances, Luis Miguel released Amarte Es un Placer (1999), a record with original material, and Vivo (2000), a live album.

On 28 September 2001, Luis Miguel confirmed that his next album would be another collection of bolero standards and containing original compositions. He also announced that the Royal Philharmonic Orchestra would be assisting with the string arrangements for the string arrangements. Mis Romances was recorded at the Record Plant in Hollywood, California while the string sections were arranged at Abbey Road Studios in London, England under the direction of Nick Davies. Luis Miguel handled the productions of the album himself. He later held a press conference on 30 November 2001 at the Casa Casuarina in Miami, Florida where he affirmed that Mis Romances would be the fourth record in a series of ten bolero albums.

== Musical style ==
As with its predecessors, Mis Romances features cover versions of bolero standards performed with string arrangements and a synthesizer. "Amor, Amor, Amor" (composed by Ricardo López Méndez and Gabriel Ruiz) and "La Última Noche" (composed by Bobby Collazo) are uptempo tracks with a disco influence. Luis Miguel also covers Carlos Gardel and Alfredo Le Pera's tango, "Volver". The opening track "¿Qué Sabes Tú?", originally composed by Myrta Silva, utilizes a harmonica section at the beginning. Mis Romances also includes two original compositions: "Cómo Duele" and "Al Que Me Siga", composed by Armando Manzanero and Manuel Alejandro respectively. "Cómo Duele" tells of a narrator who is in pain "because of his selfish ways".

== Promotion ==
=== Singles ===
"Amor, Amor, Amor" was released as the lead single for Mis Romances on 1 October 2001. It peaked at number 13 on Billboard's Hot Latin Songs chart. The music video for the song was directed by Rebecca Blake and filmed in the same month. It also served as the main theme for the Mexican telenovela El Manantial (2001). The second single, "Cómo Duele", was released in February 2002; it reached the top of the Hot Latin Songs chart, becoming Luis Miguel's fifteenth number-one song. The album's third single "Al Que Me Siga" peaked at number 21 on the Hot Latin Songs.

=== Tour ===
To promote Mis Romances, Luis Miguel began his Mis Romances Tour on 24 January 2002 in San Diego, California. After touring in the United States for a month, he performed one show in the Dominican Republic and Puerto Rico. Afterwards, he presented 13 shows in Mexico, including 12 consecutive shows at the National Auditorium. He also performed five shows at the Auditorio Coca-Cola in Monterrey, Mexico. Luis Miguel continued touring in the United States and ended the first leg of the tour 13 April 2002.

Luis Miguel commenced the second leg of his tour on 12 September 2002 in Chula Vista, California and presented three more shows in the United States. Luis Miguel's concerts in the country grossed over $16 million, the highest-grossing tour of the year by a Latin artist. After his performances in the United States, he made five recitals in Spain. He continued the second leg in South America performing in Chile, Peru, Uruguay, and Argentina. The tour concluded on 14 December 2002 in the Dominican Republic.

The Los Angeles Times editor Agustin Gurza compared Luis Miguel's box office sales at the Universal Amphitheater to Julio Iglesias and noted that it contrasted with the low sales of Mis Romances. The set list consisted of boleros from Mis Romances and its predecessors, as well as pop tracks and ballads from his music career.

== Critical reception and accolades ==
Professional ratings
Review scores
Source	Rating
AllMusic	3/5 stars
Chicago Sun-Times	2.5/4 stars

AllMusic critic Drago Bonacich rated the Mis Romances three out five stars noting that "Perfidia" had already been covered by several artists previously and regarded Luis Miguel's version of "Tú Me Acostumbraste" as "remembering one of Chilean Lucho Gatica's favorites". Leila Cobo of Billboard magazine called the album's production "predictable" despite being "bolstered" by Luis Miguel's vocals. Cobo cited the disc's usage of "heavy strings and synthesizers" and the disco-influenced songs such as "Amor, Amor, Amor" as examples of Luis Miguel's artistic style remaining "virtually unchanged". Laura Emerick of the Chicago Sun-Times rated the record two-and-a-half out of four stars and believed that Luis Miguel "once-distinctive approach" had "descended into formula". She felt that it may have been due to Manzanero and Silvetti's absence on the album and stated that Miguel "clearly needs to find a new way of expressing his love jones, unless he wants to run the risk of becoming the Jerry Vale" of Latin pop.

The Washington Post critic Fernando Gonzalez highlighted Mis Romances as an example of the lack of artistic creativity in the Latin pop field. He regarded Luis Miguel's decision to record another bolero a "concession to a lack of fresh ideas" and called Luis Miguel a "one-note performer". Gonzalez also opined that the artist had a "lack of nuance in his readings of lyrics and he shows little interest in phrasing, pacing or dynamics". Despite lauding the record's "exquisite arrangements" and "dazzling orchestrations", Eliseo Cardona of the Miami Herald remarked that the production "oozes formula". Cardona felt that Luis Miguel was "more interested in his bank account than his artistic and musical evolution" and that the album was recorded "with an irritating urgency" due to Luis Miguel producing the album himself. An editor for Latin Styles magazine wrote a more positive review of the album: the critic praised Luis Miguel for utilizing the string arrangements by the Royal Philharmonic Orchestra and called "Cómo Duele" one of the "most power compositions" in the disc. The editor closed the review by naming it a "one of a kind" album and "a must for all those who love a romantic ballad."

At the 2002 Billboard Latin Music Awards, Mis Romances won the award for Pop Album of the Year by a Male Artist. At the fourth annual Ritmo Latino Music Awards in the same year, it won in the category of Album of the Year. At the 2002 ALMA Awards, it was nominated Spanish language album of the year, but lost to Libre by Marc Anthony.

== Commercial performance ==
Mis Romances was released on 20 November 2001. In the United States, it debuted and peaked at number two on the Billboard Top Latin Albums chart on the week of 8 December 2001, with Marc Anthony's Libre holding off the number one position. The album also debuted on the top of the Latin Pop Albums chart and spent fourteen weeks in this position. It ended 2002 as the second bestselling Latin album of the year in the United States after Libre. It was certified quadruple Platinum in the Latin field in America by the Recording Industry Association of America (RIAA) for shipments of 400,000 copies. In Mexico, the record was awarded quadruple Platinum for shipping 600,000 units and was the bestselling album of the year in that country. Mis Romances sold over 25,000 units in Central America and was certified Platinum in the region. In South America, it was certified Gold in Brazil and Chile, and peaked at number three on the Uruguay Albums Chart. In Argentina, Mis Romances debuted atop the albums chart and the disc was certified double Platinum by the Argentine Chamber of Phonograms and Videograms Producers for shipping 120,000 copies. In Spain, it peaked at number two on the albums chart and was certified triple Platinum by the Productores de Música de España for shipping 300,000 copies. Mis Romances sold over 1.5 million copies within nine days of its release—less than expected by his record label.

== Track listing ==
No.	Title	Writer(s)	Length
1.	"¿Qué Sabes Tú?"	Myrta Silva	4:48
2.	"Tú Me Acostumbraste"	Frank Domínguez	2:34
3.	"Perfidia"	Alberto Domínguez	3:26
4.	"Amor, Amor, Amor"	Ricardo López Méndez; Gabriel Ruiz	3:42
5.	"Cómo Duele"	Armando Manzanero	3:52
6.	"Toda una Vida"	Oswaldo Farres	3:14
7.	"El Tiempo Que Te Quede Libre"	José Ángel Espinoza	2:26
8.	"Amorcito Corazón"	Jesús Camacho Villaseñor	2:50
9.	"La Última Noche"	Bobby Collazo	3:49
10.	"Volver"	Alfredo Le Pera; Carlos Gardel	3:41
11.	"Al Que Me Siga"	Manuel Alejandro	4:33

== Personnel ==
Adapted from AllMusic:

=== Performance credits ===
- Robbie Buchanan – electric piano
- Francisco Loyo – arranger, piano, electric piano
- Pepe Dougan – keyboards
- Juan Carlos Calderón – arranger
- Abraham Laboriel – bass
- Lalo Carrillo – bass
- Luis Conte – percussion
- Tom Aros – percussion
- Juan Carlos Melían – percussion
- Nick Davies – orchestra director
- Jerry Hey – arranger, trumpet
- Arturo Sandoval – trumpet
- Ramon Flores – trumpet
- Gary Grant – trumpet
- Bill Reichenbach – trombone
- Dan Higgins – saxophone
- Jeff Nathanson – saxophone
- Paul Jackson Jr. – guitar
- Michael Landau – guitar
- Todd Robinson – guitar
- Victor Feijoo – guitar
- Ramón Stagnaro – acoustic guitar, requinto, vihuela
- Dean Parks – acoustic guitar
- Gayle Levant – harp
- John "J.R." Robinson – drums
- Victor Loyo – drums
- Luis Miguel – arranger, vocalist
- Tommy Morgan – harmonica
- Royal Philharmonic Orchestra – strings
- David Theodore – oboe
- Jorge "Coco" Trivisonno – bandoneon

=== Technical credits ===
- Alejandro Asensi – executive producer
- Geoff Foster – engineer, recording
- Marco Gamboa – engineer
- Barrie Goshko – graphic design
- Jeri Heiden – graphic design
- John Heiden – graphic design
- Daniel Kresco – mixing, recording assistant
- Ron McMaster – mastering engineer
- Luis Miguel – producer
- Darren Mora – mixing, recording assistant
- Rafa Sardina – engineer
- Shari Sutcliffe – production coordination
- Alberto Tolot – photography

== Charts ==
=== Weekly charts ===
Chart (2001)	Peak position
Argentina (CAPIF)	1
European Albums (Music & Media)	60
Spain (PROMUSICAE)	2
US Billboard 200	115
US Top Latin Albums (Billboard)	2
US Latin Pop Albums (Billboard)	1

=== Monthly charts ===
Chart (2001)	Peak position
Uruguay International (CUD)	3

=== Year-end charts ===
Chart (2001)	Peak position
Argentina (CAPIF)	3
Spain (PROMUSICAE)	32
Chart (2002)	Peak position
US Top Latin Albums (Billboard)	2
US Latin Pop Albums (Billboard)	1

=== Decade-end charts ===
Decade-end chart performance for Mis Romances
Chart (2000–2009)	Position
US Top Latin Albums (Billboard)	72

== Certifications ==
Region	Certification	Certified units/sales
Argentina (CAPIF)	4× Platinum	
Brazil (Pro-Música Brasil)	Gold	50,000^{*}
Central America (CFC)	Platinum	25,000
Chile	Gold	10,000
Colombia (ASINCOL)	Gold	20,000
Mexico (AMPROFON)	4× Platinum	700,000
Spain (Promusicae)	3× Platinum	400,000
United States (RIAA)	4× Platinum (Latin)	400,000^{^}
Venezuela (APFV)	Platinum	
^{*} Sales figures based on certification alone.^{^} Shipments figures based on certification alone.

== See also ==
- 2001 in Latin music
- List of number-one Billboard Latin Pop Albums from the 2000s
- List of best-selling Latin albums
