= Luis Miguel =

Mexican singer (born 1970)

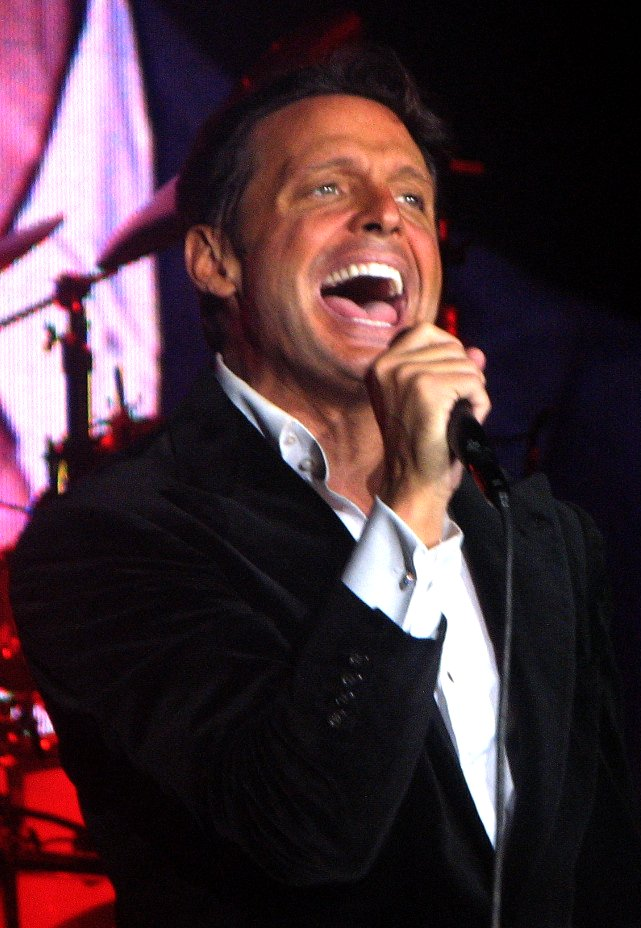
- Miguel in 2008
- Born: Luis Miguel Gallego Basteri; 19 April 1970 (age 56); San Juan, Puerto Rico
- Citizenship: United States; Mexico
- Occupations: Singer; record producer
- Years active: 1981–present
- Children: 3
- Parents: Luisito Rey (father); Marcela Basteri (mother)
- Awards: Full list
- Musical career
- Genres: Latin pop; bolero; mariachi; ballads; regional Mexican
- Instruments: Vocals; piano
- Labels: EMI Mexico; Warner Latina
- Website: luismigueloficial.com

Luis Miguel Gallego Basteri (pronounced [ˈlwis miˈɣel ɣaˈʝeɣo βaˈsteɾi]; born 19 April 1970) is a Mexican singer and record producer. Born in Puerto Rico to an Italian mother and a Spanish father, he is often referred to as "El Sol de México" ("The Sun of Mexico"). Luis Miguel has sung in multiple genres and styles, including pop songs, ballads, boleros, tangos, jazz, big band, and mariachi. He is also recognized as the only major Latin singer of his generation not to cross over to the Anglo market during the "Latin Explosion" in the 1990s.

Despite recording in Spanish and Italian, Miguel continued to be the best-selling Latin artist in the 1990s and was credited for popularizing the bolero genre within the mainstream market. He has sold around 60 million records worldwide, making him one of the best-selling Latin music artists.

Latin pop music, along with his personal life and showmanship on stage, has made Miguel popular for nearly his entire career, which started in Mexico in 1981. At the age of 14, he received his first Grammy for his duet "Me Gustas Tal Como Eres" with Sheena Easton, making him one of the youngest Grammy-winning artists in music history. In 1991, the RIAA recognized the success of his 1991 album Romance as one of the best-selling Latin albums of all time. He was the first Latino artist to earn two platinum certifications for Spanish-language albums in the United States, for Romance and Segundo Romance (the latter earning him 35 platinum records throughout Central and South America). He is also recognized by Billboard as the artist with the most top-10 hits on Billboard's Hot Latin Songs chart. His album Cómplices was released in 2008, peaking at No. 10 on the mainstream Billboard 200; his most recent album, ¡México Por Siempre!, was released in 2017 and earned him his second number one on the Billboard Regional Mexican Albums chart, achieving double-platinum status.

Miguel is also known for his high-grossing, captivating live performances. He is the highest-grossing Latino touring artist since Boxscore began tracking touring data in 1990, with a total of $633.1 million, and 6.3 million spectators With the Luis Miguel Tour 2023–24, he visited 20 countries in North America, South America and Europe, where he performed in a year and a half span with a total of 194 shows all over the world, making it the highest-grossing tour ever made by a Latin artist. He also holds the record for the most consecutive presentations in the Auditorio Nacional (National Auditorium) with a total of 30 consecutive concerts, as well as the record for the most presentations in the same venue with a total of 258 concerts. As of October 2020, Luis Miguel ranks number two on Billboard's Greatest of All-Time Latin Artists chart.

== Early life ==
Luis Miguel was born in San Juan, Puerto Rico, to parents Luisito Rey and Marcella Basteri. During his childhood years, his father, who was also his manager, encouraged him to watch and analyze nearly every movie, recording, and concert performance of Elvis Presley. In 1982, he released his first album, Un Sol, by the Mexican branch of EMI Records, which won him his first gold disc at the age of 11. Two years later, he started touring Latin American countries including Colombia, Venezuela, Chile, and Argentina. With Un Sol, he scored a major hit with the single, "1+1=Dos Enamorados".

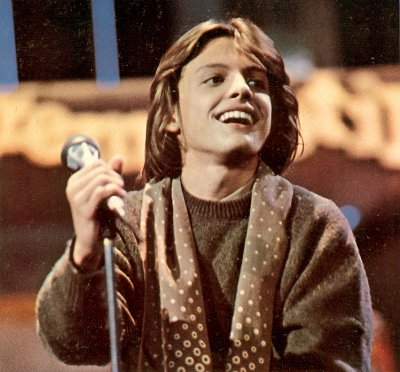
Miguel performing at the 1985 Sanremo Festival

== Career ==
=== 1984–1987: Palabra de Honor, Sanremo Music Festival and Soy Como Quiero Ser ===
In 1984, Luis Miguel took on a Spanish pop rock style of music, with the international release of his fourth studio album Palabra de Honor produced by the then Spanish Hispavox director Honorio Herrero. In 1985, at age 15, he took part in the Sanremo Music Festival, where he won the second place award with his song "Noi Ragazzi Di Oggi". That same year, he was also presented with the "Antorcha de Plata" Award in the Viña del Mar Music Festival for his duet single "Me Gustas Tal Como Eres" ("I Like You Just As You Are") with Scottish singer Sheena Easton. In 1983, he co-starred in the film Ya Nunca Más (released 1984) and in 1985, Fiebre de amor.

In 1986, he took a brief hiatus as his relationship with his father was souring due to alleged mismanagement, poor financial decisions and risking the earnings of his career. Shortly after signing with Warner Records, in 1987, he fired his father and started to work with Juan Carlos Calderón. Luis Miguel's album Soy Como Quiero Ser in May 1987 sold well over 2.5 million records. The album featured Spanish-language adaptations of popular English-language songs, such as "Ahora Te Puedes Marchar" and "Yo Que No Vivo Sin Ti".

=== 1988–1990: Busca una Mujer and 20 Años ===
On 25 November 1988, Luis Miguel's album Busca una Mujer was released. The first single "La Incondicional" became a top-ten hit throughout Latin America in the first half of 1989, and thanks in part to the music video, it spent over seven months on the top ten of many Latin American charts. The video was shocking to many fans as he had cut his signature long hair. This cemented his transition from a child star into an adult superstar. By the end of 1989, the second single "Fría Como el Viento" reached No. 1 on the Hot Latin Tracks. He also had a top-ten single with "Separados" in early 1990, peaking at No. 8.

In 1990, he continued his successful transition from child singer to adult showman with the album 20 Años and an ensuing string of sold-out shows first in Mexico then throughout Latin America and elsewhere in the world. 20 Años sold 600,000 copies in its first week of release and resulted in the release of three singles: "Tengo Todo Excepto A Ti", "Entrégate", and "Amante del amor", with the two former hitting number 1 on Billboard's Hot Latin Tracks in 1990.

=== 1991–1993: Romance and Aries ===
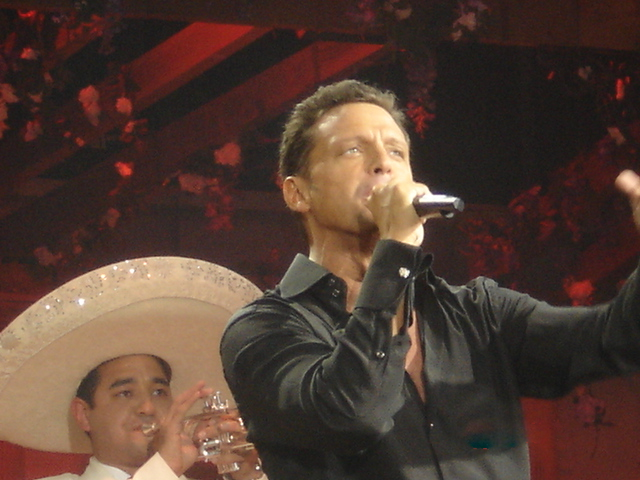
Luis Miguel in concert live with Mariachi

In 1991, Luis Miguel's career went to even greater heights and earned him the respect of a wider audience with the release of Romance, an album of romantic boleros, most from the 1950s. He has been credited with reinventing the bolero for modern audiences. The album Romance, which became his most successful material ever, eventually sold 7 million units worldwide.

In 1993, Luis Miguel's ninth studio album, Aries, was released, which won him that year's Grammy Award for Best Latin Pop Album. That same year, Luis Miguel was invited by Frank Sinatra to join him on his Duets II album and to perform live in a nationally televised special in honor of Sinatra's 80th birthday, along with other stars such as Stevie Wonder and Natalie Cole.

=== 1994–1996: Segundo Romance and Nada Es Igual ===
In 1994, he released a sequel to Romance, Segundo Romance, featuring him as a convincing pop singer with mastery over timeless Latin classics such as "Solamente Una Vez" and "Historia de un Amor". The album earned Miguel another Grammy Award, as well as platinum status in the United States.

In 1996, for his contribution to the recording industry, Luis Miguel received a star and was inducted to the Hollywood Walk of Fame, at that time the youngest male singer to receive a star. Soon after, Luis Miguel returned to the studio and released Nada Es Igual, a pop album featuring "Sueña", the main theme for Disney's The Hunchback of Notre Dame.

=== 1997–1999: Romances and Amarte Es un Placer ===
In 1997, Luis Miguel released his third album of the bolero series Romances, which sold over 5 million copies. "Por Debajo de la Mesa" was released as the lead single from the album. The single quickly reached number one on the Billboard Hot Latin Songs chart, two months later; it would spend twenty-six weeks on the chart. At the 40th Annual Grammy Awards in 1998, Luis Miguel won the award for Best Latin Pop Performance. He also received the Billboard Latin Music Award for "Male Pop Album of the Year" and the World Music Award for "Best Selling Latin Artist" in the same year.

In 1999, Luis Miguel released his thirteenth studio album Amarte Es un Placer which, in 2000, earned him two Latin Grammys for being Best Album of the Year and Best Pop Album of the Year. The single "O Tú, O Ninguna" of Amarte Es Un Placer became number 1 on the Billboard Hot Latin Tracks and perched at the top position for eight consecutive weeks. Following the success of Amarte Es Un Placer, Luis Miguel released Mis Romances in 2001, his fourth album in the bolero series. The album, which sold over two million copies worldwide was followed by the launch of Mis Romances Tour which took place throughout the U.S., Europe, and Latin America.

=== 2003–2004: 33 and Mexico en la Piel ===
In 2003, Luis Miguel released his first pop album in over four years entitled 33, indicative of his age. The album, which featured a collection of ballads and uptempo songs climbed to number 1 on Billboard's Latin Charts earning Luis Miguel two Billboard Awards as well as Grammy and Latin Grammy award nominations. On the 33 Tour, Luis Miguel filled the largest halls in the U.S., toured throughout Latin America, including Chile where his album 33 sold 2.5 million copies and was recognized that same year by Warner Chile as the artist with the most sold records sold in the history of Chile. He also performed at Mexico's sold-out National Auditorium, and various sold-out shows in Buenos Aires, as well as other prestigious international venues such as Plaza de Toros de Las Ventas in Spain.

That same year, Prince Felipe of Spain presented him with a special award for being the best-selling foreign artist in his country's history, and hosted a special party in his honor in Madrid. In addition to his album 33 Luis Miguel was bestowed by Lo Nuestro Awards in 2003 a "Premio Lo Nuestro a la Excelencia", (literally, The "Ours" award for Excellence) a lifetime achievement award for his outstanding career at the mere age of 33 being the youngest artist to receive this award.

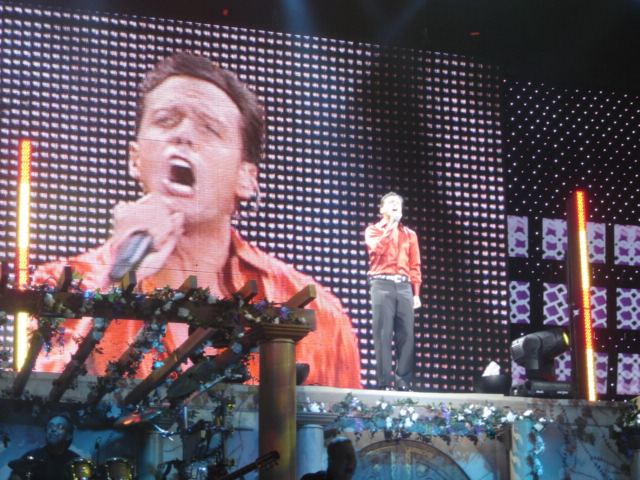
Luis Miguel in Mexico City in 2006

In 2004, Luis Miguel released his Mexico En La Piel. The album, which was a collection of traditional Mexican mariachi songs, went on to sell five million copies worldwide. For this album, he received a diamond disc and won the Latin Grammy Award for Best Ranchero Album at the Latin Grammy Awards of 2005 and also the Grammy Award for Best Mexican/Mexican-American Album. He launched his Mexico En La Piel Tour in 2005. In 2006, Luis Miguel performed thirty shows between 18 January and 27 February at the National Auditorium in Mexico City. The 123-date tour started in September 2005 in Mexico which then stretched to Argentina, Chile and Uruguay. The Mexico En La Piel Tour won the Billboard "Tour of the Year" and positioned itself as No.1 on the Billboard World Top Boxscore.

=== 2005: Grandes Éxitos and Navidades ===
In 2005, Luis Miguel released Grandes Éxitos, his first greatest hits album, that featured his greatest songs he recorded during all his career, including two never-released singles: "Misterios Del Amor" and "Si Te Perdiera". That same year, he released a Christmas album called Navidades. The playlist includes many Christmas standards in Spanish. The album reached number one on Billboard's Top Latin Albums chart during the first week of its release. The album released two singles "Santa Claus Llegó A La Ciudad" ("Santa Claus Is Comin' to Town"), and "Mi Humilde Oración" ("My Grown-up Christmas List").

=== 2008–2010: Cómplices and Luis Miguel ===
On 6 May 2008, Luis Miguel released Cómplices, produced by him and written by Spanish composer Manuel Alejandro. It sold almost 350,000 copies in the first 24 hours. The first single, "Si Tú Te Atreves" was released on 7 April 2008, and the second single of the album was "Te Desean". Luis Miguel made history with his album Complices which debuted at No.10 on the Billboard Top 200, being the highest position a Latin artist has ever reached on the Billboard Top 200 with a fully Spanish-composed album, it also reached No.1 on the Billboard Top Latin Albums making him the Latin artist with the most No.1 albums on the chart with a total of 9 albums. His Complices Tour began in Seattle, Washington on 3 September 2008.

Luis Miguel released his self-titled studio album on 14 September 2010. Its first single "Labios de Miel" is a smooth Latin pop song. The tour started on 4 November 2010 in the city of Lima, Peru and covered the United States, South America, Mexico and Spain among other countries. On 22 February 2012, he sang at the Viña del Mar International Song Festival. With one million dollars for his performance, he became the most expensive artist in the history of the festival. Luis Miguel performed at the Curaçao North Sea Jazz Festival on 31 August 2013. In August 2014, the song "Déjà Vu" was leaked on the web.

=== 2017–2018: Television biopic and ¡Mexico Por Siempre! ===
On 4 May 2017, Telemundo signed a deal for the exclusive U.S. broadcast rights to the "officially authorized TV series" based on Luis Miguel's life story and announced it would air in 2018. On the same day, Netflix also revealed it has the rights to stream the yet-unnamed bio-series in Latin America and Spain with the same target date.

On his official Facebook, page it was announced that his new single "La Fiesta del Mariachi" was set to release on 27 October 2017. On 24 November, the full album, titled ¡México Por Siempre! was released, it features 14 tracks of traditional Mexican music. The tour began February 2018, in the National Auditorium of Mexico City and ended September 2019 in Las Vegas.

On 22 April 2018, Netflix and Telemundo started airing the self-titled series Luis Miguel. Together with revealing many parts both known and unknown of the singer, it also brought nostalgic moments for those watching it, like the mirroring of his Sabritas ad, called in the series "Saboritas". Two more seasons were released in 2020 and 2021.

== Personal life ==
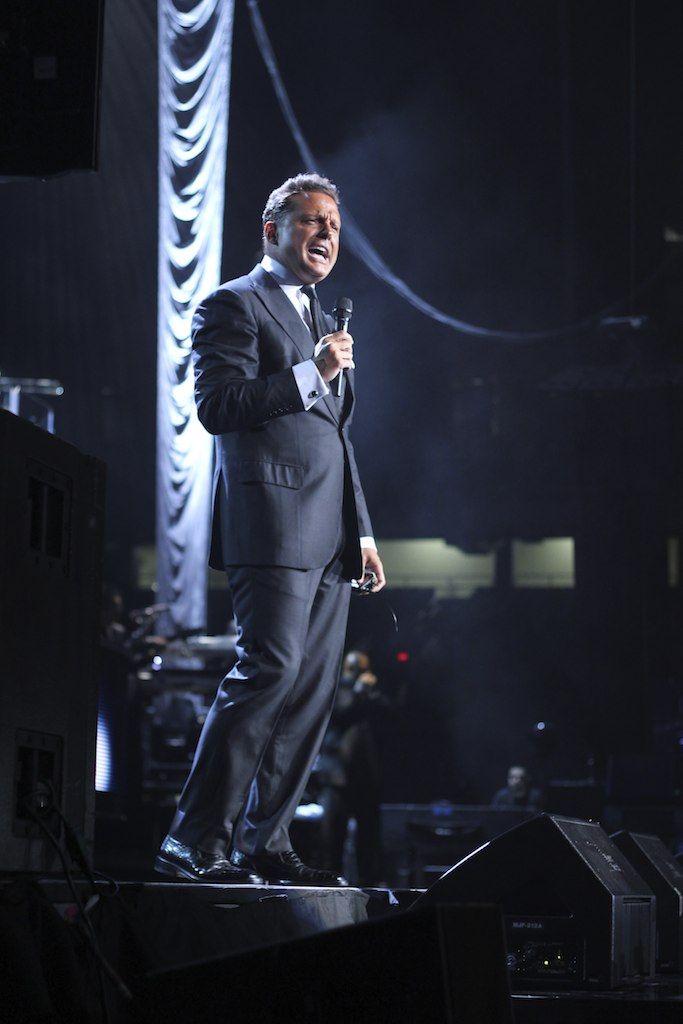
Luis Miguel performing in 2012

His father was a Spanish singer, songwriter and guitarist, Luis Gallego Sánchez, known as "Luisito Rey", and his mother was an Italian actress, Marcella Basteri. His father was from Cádiz, a city in southwestern Spain, and his mother was from the Province of Massa-Carrara, Italy. He was named Luis Miguel in honor of Spanish bullfighter Luis Miguel Dominguín. Luis Miguel has two younger brothers, Alejandro and Sergio. Due to his father's profession, the family moved to Mexico and later returned to their residence in Madrid. He grew up in the Spanish capital, where he attended primary school until the fifth grade. However, due to his involvement in the arts, he continued his education with private tutors.

His birth date is on 18 April, but he celebrates his birthday on 19 April as that was the day his father registered him at Puerto Rico's Civil Registry. Due to his early fame, Luis Miguel had a complicated childhood. He had a difficult relationship with his father, who was also his manager. His father was very strict and demanding during incessant rehearsals, although his father's strict discipline has also been credited with playing a large role in his success. In 1986, Luis Miguel's mother disappeared mysteriously and her whereabouts are still unknown. In the late 1980s, Luis Miguel fired his father due to financial problems caused by poor representation. After their estrangement, his father, who was a heavy drinker, fell into depression and died on 9 December 1992 in Barcelona, Spain.

Luis Miguel is recognized for his taste for haute cuisine and for being a self-taught sommelier. Luis Miguel released his own vintage of wine, "Único. Luis Miguel", a Cabernet Sauvignon. A native Spanish speaker, he also speaks English, Italian and Portuguese. Luis Miguel is the father of three children: a daughter born in June 1989, from his relationship with Stephanie Salas; and two sons born in January 2007 and December 2008, both from his relationship with actress Aracely Arámbula. His numerous relationships are widely covered by the Latin media.

Regarding his religious faith, he stated: "I am Catholic because I was born in a Catholic family. I believe in God, I visit church whenever I rarely have the chance due to my work commitments." He has refrained from speaking about politics, stating that an artist should be "apolitical and dedicate themselves to songs". In April 2010, he was briefly hospitalized at the Cedars-Sinai Medical Center in Los Angeles. The cause of the hospitalization was not disclosed. On 2 May 2017, Luis Miguel surrendered himself to the U.S. Marshals following a case with his former manager William Brockhaus; Luis Miguel had been ordered to pay Brockhaus over one million dollars in July 2016. He signed a promissory note and was released shortly after arrest.

== Artistry and image ==
Luis Miguel rarely grants interviews or attends award ceremonies. He is always escorted by a diligent security team and he is transported in several trucks to distract paparazzi and reporters. He is quoted as saying, "I maintain my sanity by keeping my distance."

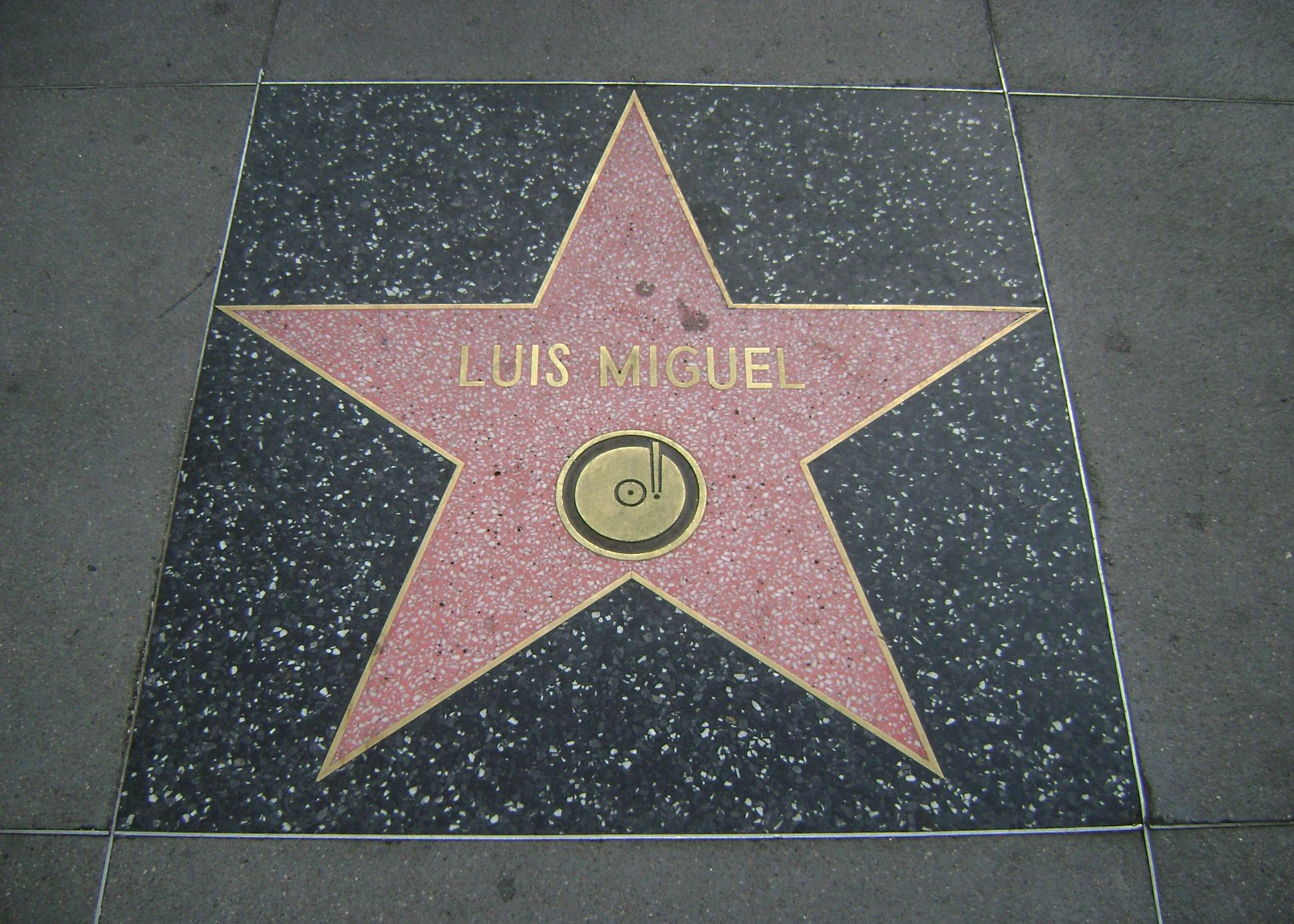
Luis Miguel's star on the Hollywood Walk of Fame

Luis Miguel is considered one of the top male pop singers worldwide today. His light tenor vocals span three octaves and six notes. In a career that has spanned almost forty years, he has become the main male singer from Latin America, having performed successfully pop music, bolero, mariachi and romantic ballads. In the late 1980s, Luis Miguel made the transition from child star to consolidated international singer, and since then, he became one of the most revered and popular Latin American artists ever. Also dubbed as a crooner, his wide vocal range and performance have been praised by critics and other artists all over the world. Producer Gustavo Santaolalla described him as "one of the greatest singers of all time" and stated that "Luis Miguel is not just a singer, he's an artist."

Frank Sinatra personally invited Luis Miguel to participate in a duet in the album Duets II. Luis Miguel has been dubbed several times by the press and the media as the "Latin Frank Sinatra". His music has reached speaking continents such as Asia and Africa. The press stated that at the time of his capture, the dictator Saddam Hussein had the album Segundo Romance, among his belongings.

His net worth is estimated at US$180 million.

=== Summary of distinctions ===
At the age of 14, Luis Miguel received a Grammy Award for his duet "Me Gustas Tal Como Eres" ("I Like You Just The Way You Are") with Sheena Easton. In 1991, the RIAA gave him a recognition for the high sales of the albums Romance and Segundo Romance. He was the only Latin artist to perform at the show "Sinatra: 80 Years My Way", along with other pop icons such as Bruce Springsteen, Natalie Cole and Bob Dylan. His 1997 album Romances became the first Spanish-language album ever debuting at No. 14 on the Billboard Top 200. Warner Music Group recognized Luis Miguel as the best-selling artist in the history of Chile with over 2.5 million records sold. In 2003, Prince Felipe of Spain presented him with a special award for being the best-selling foreign artist in his country's history. In 2008, Luis Miguel's album Navidades became the first Christmas album ever to be nominated for the Grammy in the category of Pop. His album Cómplices broke records in Mexico, by selling over 320,000 copies on its first day of release. Just three days after its release, his new album achieved Quadruple Platinum certification in Mexico, Platinum in Argentina and gold records in Chile and the United States.

Luis Miguel is also known for his high-grossing tours in Chile, Uruguay, Venezuela, Brazil and Spain between 1999 and 2000. The tour consisted of 99 concerts and was attended by approximately 1.4 million fans. It was the highest-grossing tour ever made by a Latin artist, as well as the most extended. These two records have been broken by his Mexico En La Piel Tour. His 33 Tour peaked at No. 1 in the Billboard World Top Boxscore. The Mexico En La Piel Tour of 2005–2007, with a total of 124 concerts, peaked at No. 1 in the Billboard World Top Boxscore. The tour spanned two years with a total of 129 concerts attended by over 1.5 million spectators, and grossed around $95 million. In 2006, during the Mexico En La Piel Tour, after giving 30 consecutive sold-out concerts at the Auditorio Nacional in Mexico, gathering over 260,000 spectators he was awarded with the "Estela de Plata" at the last concert. His Luis Miguel Tour is ranked at number five of the highest-grossing tours of 2011 in North America.

=== Awards and recognitions ===
- In 1984, received the Grammy Award for Best Mexican American Performance for his duet "Me Gustas Tal Como Eres" (I Like You Just The Way You Are) with Sheena Easton.
- In 1985, Luis Miguel won Antorcha de Plata at the Festival de la Cancion de Viña del Mar for his duet "Me Gustas Tal Como Eres" (I Like You Just The Way You Are) with Sheena Easton.
- In 1985, wins the second place at the Sanremo Music Festival in Italy with the song "Noi Ragazzi di Oggi" (Lyrics by Cristiano Minellono - Music by Salvatore Cutugno).
- In 1990, won two more Antorcha de Plata at the Festival de la Cancion de Viña del Mar.
- In 1991, Luis Miguel was recognized at South Korea International Music Award as the best abroad for his album "Romance" for Romance.
- In 1991, received recognition by RIAA for selling 2 million copies of Romance and Segundo Romance.
- In 1992, he received European Excellence prize in Spain.
- In 1992, received a Billboard Awards for the Best Latin Artist, for the Best Spanish-language Album (for his album Romance) and Best Singer in Spanish.
- In 1993, received a Billboard Awards for Best Latin Male Artist of the Year, Best Spanish-Language Album of the Year Aries.
- In 1993, received a Grammy Award for the Best Latin Pop Album Aries.
- In 1994, received a Grammy Award for being the Best Latin Male singer with his album Segundo Romance.
- In 1994, he was invited to record a special-edition duet of "Come Fly With Me" with Frank Sinatra for his album Duets II.
- In 1995, became the single Latin artist to perform at the show SINATRA: 80 Years My Way along with other pop icons such as Bruce Springsteen, Natalie Cole and Bob Dylan.
- In 1996, received a star in the Hollywood Walk of Fame.
- In 1996, he recorded the song "Sueña" (Spanish version of "Someday") for the Disney movie The Hunchback of Notre Dame.
- In 1997, Pollstar Magazine recognized Luis Miguel as the first Latin artist to enter the list of All-Time Top-20 grossing artists who have sold as many records in a single location in the history of music.
- In 1997, the album Romances became the first Spanish-language album ever debuting on the Billboard Top 200.
- In 1997, Luis Miguel received a Grammy Award for being the Best Latin Pop Artist of the Year with his album Romances.
- In 2000, received a Latin Grammy Award for Best Album of the Year and Best Pop Album of the Year on his Amarte es un Placer.
- In 2000, received a Latin Grammy Award for Best Pop Album.
- In 2000, received a Latin Grammy Award for being the Best Pop Male Artist.
- In 2001, he received a Billboard Award for Best Male Pop Vocal Performance which included a collaboration with Michael Jackson in the Spanish version of "What More Can I Give" entitled "Todo Para Ti" dedicated to the victims of 11 September 2001 attacks in New York.
- In 2002 received the Premio Luna de Mexico (Moon of Mexico Award) for being the artist with the best artistic career (at that time of 20 years).
- In 2003, Warner Music recognized him as the best-selling artist in the history of Chile with over 2.5 million records sold.
- The 33 Tour peaked at No. 1 in the Billboard World Top Boxscore.
- In 2005, received a Latin Grammy Award for Best Ranchero Album México En La Piel.
- In 2005, received a Grammy Awards for Best Mexican Album Mexico En La Piel.
- In 2005, followed by the En La Piel Tour in Mexico, Luis Miguel gave 6 consecutive sold-out concerts in the Gibson Universal Amphitheater in Los Angeles, CA.
- The Mexico En La Piel Tour peak No. 1 in the Billboard World Top Boxscore.
- In 2005, Luis Miguel became the first Latin artist to receive a star on the streets of Las Vegas Star.
- In 2006, he won Estela de Plata for his tour in Mexico for giving 30 concerts at Auditorio Nacional, which, all in all gathered around 300,000 spectators.
- In 2008, Luis Miguel's album Navidades became the first Christmas album ever being nominated in the Grammy in the category of Pop.
- In 2008, the online store amazon.com announced that the album Complices had peaked number 1 in the list best-selling albums in the website two weeks before the release of the album.
- Cómplices broke records in Mexico, by selling over 320,000 copies in its first day of release.
- Cómplices debuts at No. 1 on the Billboard Top Latin Albums, making Luis Miguel the artist with the most albums in this position in the history of the chart.
- Cómplices debuts at No. 10 on the Billboard 200, the highest position Miguel would achieve on the American charts.
- Cómplices hits Diamond status in Mexico three weeks after of release, with over 400,000 copies sold.
- Dalia Silver 180 Concert Auditorio Nacional.
- Album "No Culpes a la Noche" No. 180 in the Billboard 200.
- Labios de Miel No. 1 in Mexico with Quadruple Platinum Album.
- In October 2010, is recognized by the "Latino Awards 2010" as "Artist of the Century" in New York.
- In 2011, National Auditorium recognition for being the only artist with 200 submissions in the history of enclosure.
- TOUR 2011 was ranked No. 3 HOT TOURS of Billboard Magazine.
- ARTIST Named No. 1 in more accumulated in the charts hits "Hot Latin Songs" Billboard Magazine issue 25 Years of Billboard "Hot Latin Songs".
- On 22 February 2012 at the "International Song Festival of Viña del Mar" is rewarded with 3 "Gulls" (gold, silver, platinum) and the keys to the city.
- On 2 September 2012 in the "People in Spanish Festival" is awarded with "Lifetime Achievement Award" and "Mayor for a Day" in the city of San Antonio, Texas.
- Receive on 22 October 2012 in Argentina at the hands of President Cristina Kirschner a plaque in recognition of his 100 presentations in that country (1982–2012).
- In October 2012 he was named "distinguished guest" by the city of Antofagasta.
- On 13 September 2013 in Las Vegas is awarded with "Diamond Award", a certificate from the Nevada Governor's Office for their contributions to the state, a certificate from the United States Senate recognizing him as one of the top Hispanic artists in the world, and "Day of Luis Miguel".
- In 2018, received two Latin Grammy Award for Best Mariachi Album and Album of the Year.
- In 2018, received a Grammy Awards for Best Regional Mexican Album Mexico Por Siempre.

== Discography ==
- Un sol (1982)
- Directo al corazón (1982)
- Decídete (1983)
- Ya nunca más (1983)
- También es Rock (1984)
- Palabra de Honor (1984)
- Fiebre de amor (1985)
- Soy Como Quiero Ser (1987)
- Busca Una Mujer (1988)
- 20 Años (1990)
- Romance (1991)
- Aries (1993)
- Segundo Romance (1994)
- Nada Es Igual (1996)
- Romances (1997)
- Amarte Es Un Placer (1999)
- Mis Romances (2001)
- 33 (2003)
- México En La Piel (2004)
- Navidades (2006)
- Cómplices (2008)
- Luis Miguel (2010)
- ¡México Por Siempre! (2017)

== Concert tours ==
- Busca Una Mujer Tour (1989–1990)
- 20 Años Tour (1990–1991)
- Romance Tour (1991–1992)
- Aries Tour (1993–1994)
- Segundo Romance Tour (1994)
- El Concierto Tour (1995)
- America Tour (1996)
- Romances Tour (1997–1998)
- Amarte Es Un Placer Tour (1999–2000)
- Mis Romances Tour (2002)
- 33 Tour (2003–2004)
- Mexico En La Piel Tour (2005–2007)
- Cómplices Tour (2008–2009)
- Luis Miguel Tour (2010–2012)
- The Hits Tour (2012–2013)
- Deja Vu Tour (2014–2015)
- México Por Siempre Tour (2018–2019)
- Luis Miguel Tour 2023–24 (2023–2024)
- Luis Miguel Tour 2027 (2027)

== Awards and nominations ==
=== Grammy Awards ===
The Grammy Awards are awarded annually by the National Academy of Recording Arts and Sciences of the United States. Miguel received six awards from fifteen nominations.

Year Awarded	Nominee/work	Category	Result
1985	"Me Gustas Tal Como Eres"	Best Mexican-American Performance	Won
1988	Soy Como Quiero Ser	Best Latin Pop Album	Nominated
1991	20 Años	Best Latin Pop Album	Nominated
1993	Romance	Best Latin Pop Album	Nominated
1994	Aries	Best Latin Pop Album	Won
1995	Segundo Romance	Best Latin Pop Album	Won
1997	Nada Es Igual	Best Latin Pop Album	Nominated
1998	Romances	Best Latin Pop Album	Won
2000	Amarte Es Un Placer	Best Latin Pop Album	Nominated
2001	Vivo	Best Latin Pop Album	Nominated
2004	33	Best Latin Pop Album	Nominated
2006	México en la Piel	Best Mexican/Mexican-American Album	Won
2008	Navidades	Best Latin Pop Album	Nominated
2009	Cómplices	Best Latin Pop Album	Nominated
2019	¡México Por Siempre!	Best Regional Mexican Music Album	Won

=== Latin Grammy Awards ===
The Latin Grammy Awards are awarded annually by The Latin Academy of Recording Arts & Sciences of the United States. Miguel received six awards from nine nominations.

Year Awarded	Nominee/work	Category	Result
2000	Amarte Es Un Placer	Album of the Year	Won
2000	Amarte Es Un Placer	Best Pop Vocal Album	Won
2000	"Tú Mirada"	Best Male Pop Vocal Performance	Won
2001	Vivo	Best Male Pop Vocal Album	Nominated
2003	"Hasta Que Vuelvas"	Record of the Year	Nominated
2004	33	Best Male Pop Vocal Album	Nominated
2005	México En La Piel	Best Ranchero Album	Won
2018	¡México Por Siempre!	Album of the Year	Won
2018	¡México Por Siempre!	Best Ranchero Album	Won

== Filmography ==
Year	Title	Role	Ref.
1984	Ya nunca más	Luis Aranda	
1985	Fiebre de amor	Himself	
2018	Luis Miguel: The Series	Himself (Cameo)	

== See also ==
- List of best-selling Latin music artists
- List of Mexicans
- List of Puerto Ricans
