= Luis Miguel Tour =

2010–12 concert tour by Luis Miguel

- Tour by Luis Miguel
- Promotional poster for the 2011 tour
- Associated album: Luis Miguel
- Start date: September 15, 2010
- End date: May 12, 2012
- Legs: 3
- No. of shows: 81 in North America; 30 in South America; 5 in Central America; 9 in Europe; 125 total
- Box office: $45.4 million (78 shows)

Luis Miguel concert chronology
- Cómplices Tour (2008–09); Luis Miguel Tour (2010–12); The Hits Tour (2012–13)

Luis Miguel Tour was a concert tour performed by Luis Miguel to promote his album Luis Miguel. The tour was announced during a press conference from the Augustus Ballroom at Caesars Palace in Las Vegas on September 13, 2010. Pollstar ranked the tour at number five of the highest-grossing tours of 2011 in North America.

== History ==
The tour began in Las Vegas with four concerts in celebration of the proclamation of independence of Mexico. Later, the tour continued to South America where he visited Peru, Chile, Argentina, Paraguay and Bolivia

In January 2011, Luis Miguel returned to the United States for six concerts in the following cities: San Diego, Palm Springs, Los Angeles and San Jose.

In February 2011, a season of concerts in Mexico began, with twenty concerts occurring at the National Auditorium. Luis Miguel then performed at cities including Guadalajara, Monterrey, Puebla, Leon, San Luis Potosí, Torreon, Querétaro, Veracruz and Tuxtla. Over in Central America, the tour came to Guatemala, Honduras and El Salvador. He returned to Mexico for a total of 41 concerts.

In May he opened another concert stage in the United States and Canada. The North American part of the tour took Luis Miguel to cities such as Miami, Orlando, Toronto, Chicago, Newark, Dallas, Tucson, El Paso, Albuquerque, Laredo, Hidalgo, San Antonio, Houston, Los Angeles, Fresno, Phoenix, and then close in Chula Vista, San Bernardino and Las Vegas. The Dominican Republic and Puerto Rico were also tour locations.

In February 2012 he began the celebration of 30 years of career with a concert in Punta del Este, and then participated in the "Viña del Mar International Song Festival" in Chile. Later, Luis Miguel opened the Mexico City Arena. He also visited Tampico and Monterrey.

In March he returned to Central America, particularly Costa Rica and Panama. Comes back to South America where he visited countries like Venezuela, Ecuador and Brazil (the latter not visited for 13 years).

In April he arrived in Spain for nine concerts, in cities such as Madrid, Barcelona, Seville, Malaga, Alicante, Palma, Caceres, and Santiago de Compostela.

== Tour set list ==
Luis Miguel Tour: (4 shows) Sep 15, 2010 – Sep 18, 2010

Luis Miguel Tour: (4 shows) Sep 15, 2010 – Sep 18, 2010
No.	Title	Original album	Length
1.	"In the Stone Intro"
2.	"Te Propongo Esta Noche"	Amarte Es Un Placer
3.	"Suave"	Aries
4.	"Dame Tu Amor"	Aries
5.	"Con Tus Besos"	33
6.	"Speech / Tres Palabras"	Luis Miguel
7.	"La Barca"	Romance
8.	"Come Fly With Me"	Duets II
9.	"J.C. Calderón Medley" (Entrégate / La Incondicional)	20 Años, Busca Una Mujer
10.	"Boleros Medley" (Inolvidable / Besame Mucho / La Última Noche / Amor, Amor, Amor)	Romance, Romances, Mis Romances
11.	"Tú Sólo Tú"	Amarte Es Un Placer
12.	"Te Necesito"	33
13.	"Interlude (Ay Jalisco No Te Rajes)"
14.	"Mariachi Medley" (Cielito Lindo / Que Bonita Es Mi Tierra / Viva México, Viva América)
15.	"México En La Piel"	México En La Piel
16.	"Entrega Total"	México En La Piel
17.	"El Rey"	El Concierto
18.	"Mariachi Medley" (Si Nos Dejan / Échame A Mí La Culpa / Sabes Una Cosa)	El Concierto, México En La Piel
19.	"Mariachi Medley" (Que Seas Felíz / Y / De Que Manera Te Olvido / La Bikina / El Viajero)	Vivo, México En La Piel
20.	"Oldies Medley" (Decídete / Muchachos de Hoy / Ahora Te Puedes Marchar / La Chica Del Bikini Azul / Isabel / Cuando Calienta El Sol)	Decídete, Fiebre De Amor, Soy Como Quiero Ser, Palabra de Honor
21.	"Closers Medley" (Vuelve / Eres / Como Es Posible Que A Mi Lado / Será Que No Me Amas / Te Propongo Esta Noche)	33, Nada Es Igual, 20 Años, Amarte Es Un Placer
22.	"Labios De Miel"	Luis Miguel

Luis Miguel Tour: (81 shows) Nov 4, 2010 – June 3, 2011

Luis Miguel Tour: (81 shows) Nov 4, 2010 – June 3, 2011
No.	Title	Original album	Length
1.	"In the Stone Intro"
2.	"Te Propongo Esta Noche"	Amarte Es Un Placer
3.	"Suave"	Aries
4.	"Con Tus Besos"	33
5.	"Speech / Tres Palabras"	Luis Miguel
6.	"La Barca"	Romance
7.	"Volver"	Mis Romances
8.	"Come Fly With Me"	Duets II
9.	"O Tú O Ninguna"	Amarte Es Un Placer
10.	"Oldies Ballads Medley" (No Me Puedes Dejar Así / Palabra de Honor / Entrégate / La Incondicional)	Decídete, Palabra De Honor, 20 Años, Busca Una Mujer
11.	"Up Tempo Medley" (Un Hombre Busca Una Mujer / Cuestión de Piel / Oro de Ley)	Busca Una Mujer, 20 Años
12.	"Tú Sólo Tú"	Amarte Es Un Placer
13.	"Te Necesito"	33
14.	"Interlude (Piano) / No Existen Límites"	Luis Miguel
15.	"Ella Es Así"	Luis Miguel
16.	"Lo Que Queda De Mí (Only in 2010)"	Luis Miguel
17.	"Interlude (Trumpet) / Mujer de Fuego"	Luis Miguel
18.	"Que Nivel De Mujer"	Aries
19.	"Oldies Medley" (Decídete / Muchachos de Hoy / Ahora Te Puedes Marchar / La Chica Del Bikini Azul / Isabel / Cuando Calienta El Sol)	Decídete, Fiebre De Amor, Soy Como Quiero Ser, Palabra de Honor
20.	"Closers Medley" (Vuelve / Eres / Como Es Posible Que A Mi Lado / Será Que No Me Amas / Te Propongo Esta Noche)	33, Nada Es Igual, 20 Años, Amarte Es Un Placer
21.	"Labios De Miel"	Luis Miguel

Luis Miguel Tour: (9 shows) Jun 4, 2011 – Jun 19, 2011

Luis Miguel Tour: (9 shows) June 4, 2011 – June 19, 2011
No.	Title	Original album	Length
1.	"In the Stone Intro"
2.	"Te Propongo Esta Noche"	Amarte Es Un Placer
3.	"Suave"	Aries
4.	"Con Tus Besos"	33
5.	"Speech / Tres Palabras"	Luis Miguel
6.	"La Barca"	Romance
7.	"Volver (Only June 4)"	Mis Romances
8.	"Boleros Medley" (Todo Y Nada / Sabor A Mí / Sin Tí)	Segundo Romance, Romances
9.	"Come Fly With Me"	Duets II
10.	"O Tú O Ninguna"	Amarte Es Un Placer
11.	"Oldies Ballads Medley" (No Me Puedes Dejar Así / Palabra de Honor / Entrégate / La Incondicional)	Decídete, Palabra De Honor, 20 Años, Busca Una Mujer
12.	"Up Tempo Medley" (Un Hombre Busca Una Mujer / Cuestión de Piel / Oro de Ley)	Busca Una Mujer, 20 Años
13.	"Tú Sólo Tú"	Amarte Es Un Placer
14.	"Te Necesito"	33
15.	"Interlude (Piano) / No Existen Límites"	Luis Miguel
16.	"Interlude (Trumpet) / Mujer de Fuego"	Luis Miguel
17.	"Que Nivel De Mujer"	Aries
18.	"Oldies Medley" (Decídete / Muchachos de Hoy / Ahora Te Puedes Marchar / La Chica Del Bikini Azul / Isabel / Cuando Calienta El Sol)	Decídete, Fiebre De Amor, Soy Como Quiero Ser, Palabra de Honor
19.	"Labios De Miel"	Luis Miguel

Luis Miguel Tour: (6 shows) Sep 10, 2011 – Sep 18, 2011

Luis Miguel Tour: (6 shows) Sep 10, 2011 – Sep 18, 2011
No.	Title	Original album	Length
1.	"In the Stone Intro"
2.	"Te Propongo Esta Noche"	Amarte Es Un Placer
3.	"Suave"	Aries
4.	"Con Tus Besos"	33
5.	"Speech / Tres Palabras"	Luis Miguel
6.	"La Barca"	Romance
7.	"Boleros Medley" (Todo Y Nada / Sabor A Mí / Sin Tí)	Segundo Romance, Romances
8.	"Come Fly With Me"	Duets II
9.	"O Tú O Ninguna"	Amarte Es Un Placer
10.	"Oldies Ballads Medley" (No Me Puedes Dejar Así / Palabra de Honor / Entrégate / La Incondicional)	Decídete, Palabra De Honor, 20 Años, Busca Una Mujer
11.	"Up Tempo Medley" (Un Hombre Busca Una Mujer / Cuestión de Piel / Oro de Ley)	Busca Una Mujer, 20 Años
12.	"Tú Sólo Tú"	Amarte Es Un Placer
13.	"Te Necesito"	33
14.	"Interlude (Piano) / No Existen Límites"	Luis Miguel
15.	"Interlude (Trumpet) / Mujer de Fuego"	Luis Miguel
16.	"Que Nivel De Mujer"	Aries
17.	"Oldies Medley" (Decídete / Muchachos de Hoy / Ahora Te Puedes Marchar / La Chica Del Bikini Azul / Isabel / Cuando Calienta El Sol)	Decídete, Fiebre De Amor, Soy Como Quiero Ser, Palabra de Honor
18.	"Interlude (Ay Jalisco No Te Rajes)"
19.	"Mariachi Medley" (Cielito Lindo / Que Bonita Es Mi Tierra / Viva México, Viva América)
20.	"Mi Ciudad"	México En La Piel
21.	"Motivos"	México En La Piel
22.	"México En La Piel"	México En La Piel
23.	"Entrega Total"	México En La Piel
24.	"Amanecí Entre Tus Brazos"	El Concierto
25.	"El Rey"	El Concierto
26.	"Mariachi Medley"	Si Nos Dejan / Échame A Mí La Culpa / Sabes Una Cosa; El Concierto, México En La Piel
27.	"Mariachi Medley"	Que Seas Felíz / Y / De Que Manera Te Olvido / La Bikina / El Viajero; Vivo, México En La Piel
28.	"Labios De Miel"	Luis Miguel

Luis Miguel Tour: (25 shows) Feb 20, 2012 – May 12, 2012

Luis Miguel Tour: (25 shows) Feb 20, 2012 – May 12, 2012
No.	Title	Original album	Length
1.	"Intro Mix"
2.	"Te Propongo Esta Noche"	Amarte Es Un Placer
3.	"Suave"	Aries
4.	"Con Tus Besos"	33
5.	"Speech / Tres Palabras"	Luis Miguel
6.	"La Barca"	Romance
7.	"Somos Novios"	Segundo Romance
8.	"Boleros Medley (Sometimes)" (No Me Platiques Más / No Sé Tú / El Día Que Me Quieras)	Romance, Segundo Romance
9.	"Boleros Medley" (Por Debajo De La Mesa / La Gloria Eres Tú / Bésame Mucho)	Romances
10.	"Boleros Medley" (Inolvidable / La Última Noche / Amor, Amor, Amor)	Romance, Romances, Mis Romances
11.	"Come Fly With Me"	Duets II
12.	"O Tu O Ninguna (Sometimes)"	Amarte Es Un Placer
13.	"Oldies Ballads Medley" (No Me Puedes Dejar Así / Palabra de Honor / Entrégate / La Incondicional)	Decídete, Palabra De Honor, 20 Años, Busca Una Mujer
14.	"Esa Niña"	Busca Una Mujer
15.	"Up Tempo Medley" (Un Hombre Busca Una Mujer / Cuestión de Piel / Oro de Ley)	Busca Una Mujer, 20 Años
16.	"Tú Sólo Tú"	Amarte Es Un Placer
17.	"Te Necesito"	33
18.	"Interlude (Piano) / No Existen Límites"	Luis Miguel
19.	"Que Nivel De Mujer"	Aries
20.	"Fiebre de Amor (Excluded in Spain)"	Fiebre de Amor
21.	"Oldies Medley" (Decídete / Muchachos de Hoy / Ahora Te Puedes Marchar / La Chica Del Bikini Azul / Isabel / Cuando Calienta El Sol)	Decídete, Fiebre De Amor, Soy Como Quiero Ser, Palabra de Honor
22.	"Mariachi Medley (Only in Mexico City & Monterrey)" (Cielito Lindo / Que Bonita Es Mi Tierra / Viva México, Viva América)
23.	"Mariachi Medley (Only in Mexico City & Monterrey)" (Si Nos Dejan / Échame A Mí La Culpa / Sabes Una Cosa)	El Concierto, México En La Piel
24.	"Mariachi Medley (Only in Mexico City, Monterrey & Spain)" (Que Seas Felíz / Y / De Que Manera Te Olvido / La Bikina / El Viajero)	México En La Piel, Vivo
25.	"Closers Medley (Sometimes)" (Vuelve / Eres / Como Es Posible Que A Mi Lado / Será Que No Me Amas / Te Propongo Esta Noche)	33, Nada Es Igual, 20 Años, Amarte Es Un Placer
26.	"Labios De Miel"	Luis Miguel

== Tour dates ==
List of concerts, showing date, city, country, venue, tickets sold, number of available tickets and amount of gross revenue
Date	City	Country	Venue	Attendance	Revenue
North America
September 15, 2010	Las Vegas	United States	The Colosseum at Caesars Palace	16,853 / 16,853	$2,861,270
September 16, 2010	Las Vegas	United States	The Colosseum at Caesars Palace	16,853 / 16,853	$2,861,270
September 17, 2010	Las Vegas	United States	The Colosseum at Caesars Palace	16,853 / 16,853	$2,861,270
September 18, 2010	Las Vegas	United States	The Colosseum at Caesars Palace	16,853 / 16,853	$2,861,270
South America
November 4, 2010	Lima	Peru	Jockey Club del Perú	—N/a	—N/a
November 6, 2010	Asunción	Paraguay	Estadio Defensores del Chaco	—N/a	—N/a
November 7, 2010	Corrientes	Argentina	Estadio Club Huracán	—N/a	—N/a
November 9, 2010	Córdoba	Argentina	Orfeo Superdomo	—N/a	—N/a
November 10, 2010	Córdoba	Argentina	Orfeo Superdomo	—N/a	—N/a
November 11, 2010	Rosario	Argentina	Estadio Newell's Old Boys	—N/a	—N/a
November 13, 2010	San Luis	Argentina	Estadio Juan Gilberto Funes	—N/a	—N/a
November 17, 2010	Santiago	Chile	Movistar Arena	28,400 / 35,664	$3,745,481
November 18, 2010	Santiago	Chile	Movistar Arena	28,400 / 35,664	$3,745,481
November 19, 2010	Santiago	Chile	Movistar Arena	28,400 / 35,664	$3,745,481
November 20, 2010	Santiago	Chile	Movistar Arena	8,506 / 15,884	$552,864
November 23, 2010	Buenos Aires	Argentina	Pabellón Costa Salguero	—N/a	—N/a
November 25, 2010	Buenos Aires	Argentina	José Amalfitani Stadium	—N/a	—N/a
November 26, 2010	Buenos Aires	Argentina	José Amalfitani Stadium	—N/a	—N/a
November 27, 2010	Buenos Aires	Argentina	José Amalfitani Stadium	—N/a	—N/a
November 28, 2010	Buenos Aires	Argentina	José Amalfitani Stadium	—N/a	—N/a
December 1, 2010	Trelew	Argentina	Estadio Cayetano Castro	—N/a	—N/a
December 3, 2010	Neuquén	Argentina	Portal Patagonia Shopping	—N/a	—N/a
December 4, 2010	Bahía Blanca	Argentina	Estadio Alejandro Pérez	—N/a	—N/a
December 5, 2010	Mar del Plata	Argentina	Polideportivo Islas Malvinas	—N/a	—N/a
December 8, 2010	Santa Cruz de la Sierra	Bolivia	Estadio Ramón Tahuichi Aguilera	—N/a	—N/a
North America II
January 27, 2011	San Diego	United States	Viejas Arena	6,814 / 9,500	$695,372
January 28, 2011	Indio	United States	Fantasy Springs Resort Casino	2,916 / 2,916	$284,104
January 29, 2011	Los Angeles	United States	Gibson Amphitheatre	9,743 / 12,502 (Note: The score data is combined from the shows held at the Gibson Amphitheatre from January 29 and February 3, 2011, respectively.)	$1,060,395
January 30, 2011	San Jose	United States	HP Pavilion	6,291 / 7,500	$431,553
February 3, 2011	Los Angeles	United States	Gibson Amphitheatre	—	—
February 4, 2011	Los Angeles	United States	Gibson Amphitheatre	—N/a	—N/a
February 11, 2011	Mexico City	Mexico	National Auditorium	138,745 / 193,660	$10,551,787
February 12, 2011	Mexico City	Mexico	National Auditorium	138,745 / 193,660	$10,551,787
February 13, 2011	Mexico City	Mexico	National Auditorium	138,745 / 193,660	$10,551,787
February 14, 2011	Mexico City	Mexico	National Auditorium	138,745 / 193,660	$10,551,787
February 17, 2011	Mexico City	Mexico	National Auditorium	138,745 / 193,660	$10,551,787
February 18, 2011	Mexico City	Mexico	National Auditorium	138,745 / 193,660	$10,551,787
February 19, 2011	Mexico City	Mexico	National Auditorium	138,745 / 193,660	$10,551,787
February 20, 2011	Mexico City	Mexico	National Auditorium	138,745 / 193,660	$10,551,787
February 24, 2011	Mexico City	Mexico	National Auditorium	138,745 / 193,660	$10,551,787
February 25, 2011	Mexico City	Mexico	National Auditorium	138,745 / 193,660	$10,551,787
February 26, 2011	Mexico City	Mexico	National Auditorium	138,745 / 193,660	$10,551,787
February 27, 2011	Mexico City	Mexico	National Auditorium	138,745 / 193,660	$10,551,787
March 3, 2011	Mexico City	Mexico	National Auditorium	138,745 / 193,660	$10,551,787
March 4, 2011	Mexico City	Mexico	National Auditorium	138,745 / 193,660	$10,551,787
March 5, 2011	Mexico City	Mexico	National Auditorium	138,745 / 193,660	$10,551,787
March 6, 2011	Mexico City	Mexico	National Auditorium	138,745 / 193,660	$10,551,787
March 10, 2011	Mexico City	Mexico	National Auditorium	138,745 / 193,660	$10,551,787
March 11, 2011	Mexico City	Mexico	National Auditorium	138,745 / 193,660	$10,551,787
March 12, 2011	Mexico City	Mexico	National Auditorium	138,745 / 193,660	$10,551,787
March 13, 2011	Mexico City	Mexico	National Auditorium	138,745 / 193,660	$10,551,787
March 17, 2011	Guadalajara	Mexico	Telmex Auditorium	31,283 / 32,884	$2,757,544
March 18, 2011	Guadalajara	Mexico	Telmex Auditorium	31,283 / 32,884	$2,757,544
March 19, 2011	Guadalajara	Mexico	Telmex Auditorium	31,283 / 32,884	$2,757,544
March 20, 2011	Guadalajara	Mexico	Telmex Auditorium	31,283 / 32,884	$2,757,544
March 24, 2011	Monterrey	Mexico	Auditorio Banamex	19,320 / 27,880	$2,693,400
March 25, 2011	Monterrey	Mexico	Auditorio Banamex	19,320 / 27,880	$2,693,400
March 26, 2011	Monterrey	Mexico	Auditorio Banamex	19,320 / 27,880	$2,693,400
March 27, 2011	Monterrey	Mexico	Auditorio Banamex	19,320 / 27,880	$2,693,400
March 29, 2011	Puebla	Mexico	Universidad Iberoamericana	—N/a	—N/a
March 31, 2011	León	Mexico	Poliforum León	—N/a	—N/a
April 2, 2011	San Luis Potosí	Mexico	Estadio De Béisbol Veinte de Noviembre	—N/a	—N/a
April 4, 2011	Torreón	Mexico	Estadio Corona	—N/a	—N/a
April 6, 2011	Querétaro	Mexico	Estadio Corregidora	—N/a	—N/a
April 8, 2011	Veracruz	Mexico	World Trade Center Veracruz	—N/a	—N/a
April 9, 2011	Tuxtla Gutiérrez	Mexico	Estadio Víctor Manuel Reyna	—N/a	—N/a
Central America
April 12, 2011	Guatemala City	Guatemala	Estadio del Ejército	4,404 / 5,500	$781,823
April 14, 2011	Tegucigalpa	Honduras	Estadio Chochi Sosa	—N/a	—N/a
April 16, 2011	San Salvador	El Salvador	Estadio Jorge "Mágico" González	—N/a	—N/a
North America III
April 21, 2011	Acapulco	Mexico	Forum de Mundo Imperial	9,339 / 13,500	$1,185,921
April 22, 2011	Acapulco	Mexico	Forum de Mundo Imperial	9,339 / 13,500	$1,185,921
April 23, 2011	Acapulco	Mexico	Forum de Mundo Imperial	9,339 / 13,500	$1,185,921
April 26, 2011	Oaxaca	Mexico	Estadio Benito Juárez	—N/a	—N/a
April 28, 2011	Cancún	Mexico	Estadio Andrés Quintana Roo	—N/a	—N/a
April 30, 2011	Mérida	Mexico	Estadio Carlos Iturralde	—N/a	—N/a
May 11, 2011	Santo Domingo	Dominican Republic	Estadio Quisqueya	6,981 / 7,500	$593,313
May 14, 2011	San Juan	Puerto Rico	José Miguel Agrelot Coliseum	5,155 / 6,272	$618,563
May 19, 2011	Miami	United States	American Airlines Arena	12,883 / 14,400	$1,198,780
May 21, 2011	Miami	United States	American Airlines Arena	12,883 / 14,400	$1,198,780
May 22, 2011	Orlando	United States	New UCF Arena	2,612 / 4,500	$167,496
May 25, 2011	Brampton	Canada	Powerade Centre	2,750 / 3,500	$209,040
May 27, 2011	Rosemont	United States	Allstate Arena	4,958 / 7,500	$424,235
May 29, 2011	Newark	United States	Prudential Center	4,973 / 7,500	$566,871
June 1, 2011	Grand Prairie	United States	Verizon Theatre at Grand Prairie	3,118 / 4,784	$396,125
June 3, 2011	Tucson	United States	Anselmo Valencia Tori Amphitheater	2,963 / 4,500	$231,390
June 4, 2011	El Paso	United States	El Paso County Coliseum	5,371 / 6,500	$508,480
June 5, 2011	Albuquerque	United States	Sandia Casino Amphitheater	2,549 / 4,500	$163,337
June 8, 2011	Laredo	United States	Laredo Energy Arena	4,537 / 5,500	$332,572
June 9, 2011	Hidalgo	United States	State Farm Arena	4,126 / 4,376	$487,090
June 10, 2011	San Antonio	United States	AT&T Center	4,365 / 6,637	$396,741
June 11, 2011	Houston	United States	Toyota Center	6,144 / 8,395	$519,962
June 17, 2011	Los Angeles	United States	Gibson Amphitheatre	3,886 / 5,500	$366,890
June 18, 2011	Fresno	United States	Save Mart Center	1,500 / 4,636	$123,295
June 19, 2011	Phoenix	United States	Comerica Theatre	2,821 / 3,500	$205,227
September 10, 2011	Chula Vista	United States	Cricket Wireless Amphitheatre	5,903 / 11,000	$347,392
September 11, 2011	San Bernardino	United States	San Manuel Amphitheater	—N/a	—N/a
September 15, 2011	Las Vegas	United States	The Colosseum at Caesars Palace	15,206 / 16,231	$2,557,890
September 16, 2011	Las Vegas	United States	The Colosseum at Caesars Palace	15,206 / 16,231	$2,557,890
September 17, 2011	Las Vegas	United States	The Colosseum at Caesars Palace	15,206 / 16,231	$2,557,890
September 18, 2011	Las Vegas	United States	The Colosseum at Caesars Palace	15,206 / 16,231	$2,557,890
South America II
February 20, 2012	Punta del Este	Uruguay	Punta Del Este Resort & Casino	—N/a	—N/a
February 22, 2012	Viña del Mar	Chile	Quinta Vergara Amphitheater (Viña del Mar International Song Festival)	—N/a	—N/a
North America III
February 25, 2012	Mexico City	Mexico	Mexico City Arena	30,483 / 33,000	$2,114,351
February 26, 2012	Mexico City	Mexico	Mexico City Arena	30,483 / 33,000	$2,114,351
February 28, 2012	Tampico	Mexico	Expo Tampico	8,228 / 8,228	$754,270
March 1, 2012	Monterrey	Mexico	Monterrey Arena	17,620 / 17,620	$1,199,816
March 2, 2012	Monterrey	Mexico	Monterrey Arena	17,620 / 17,620	$1,199,816
Central America II
March 4, 2012	San José	Costa Rica	Estadio Ricardo Saprissa	—N/a	—N/a
March 6, 2012	Panama City	Panama	Figali Convention Center	—N/a	—N/a
South America III
March 8, 2012	São Paulo	Brazil	Credicard Hall	7,624 / 7,748	$1,682,040
March 9, 2012	São Paulo	Brazil	Credicard Hall	7,624 / 7,748	$1,682,040
March 11, 2012	Rio de Janeiro	Brazil	Citibank Hall	1,905 / 2,899	$439,806
March 13, 2012	Quito	Ecuador	Coliseo General Rumiñahui	—N/a	—N/a
March 15, 2012	Guayaquil	Ecuador	Estadio Modelo Alberto Spencer Herrera	—N/a	—N/a
March 17, 2012	Valencia	Venezuela	Parque Musical Evenpro	4,118 / 7,700	$1,191,231
March 18, 2012	Caracas	Venezuela	Estadio de Fútbol de la Universidad Simón Bolívar	—N/a	—N/a
Europe
April 27, 2012	Santiago de Compostela	Spain	Pabellón Multiusos Fontes do Sar	—N/a	—N/a
April 28, 2012	Cáceres	Spain	Pabellon Multiusos Ciudad de Caceres	—N/a	—N/a
April 30, 2012	Palma de Mallorca	Spain	Plaza de Toros de Mallorca	—N/a	—N/a
May 4, 2012	Alicante	Spain	Auditorio de IFA	—N/a	—N/a
May 5, 2012	Málaga	Spain	Palacio de Deportes José María Martín Carpena	—N/a	—N/a
May 6, 2012	Seville	Spain	Palacio Municipal de Deportes San Pablo	—N/a	—N/a
May 10, 2012	Barcelona	Spain	Palau Sant Jordi	—N/a	—N/a
May 11, 2012	Madrid	Spain	Palacio de Deportes de la Comunidad de Madrid	—N/a	—N/a
May 12, 2012	Madrid	Spain	Palacio de Deportes de la Comunidad de Madrid	—N/a	—N/a
Total				455,393 / 588,669 (77%)	$45,397,717

- The third Buenos Aires (2010) show was fully recorded for its transmission in Argentina by Telefe.
- The Viña del Mar show was fully recorded for its transmission in Chile by Chilevisión.

== Cancelled shows ==
List of cancelled concerts, showing date, city, country, venue, and reason for cancellation
Date	City	Country	Venue	Reason
May 8, 2012	Gran Canaria	Spain	Estadio Municipal Maspalomas	Production Issues

== Awards and records ==
- In October 2010, Miguel was recognized by the "Latino Awards 2010" as "Artist of the Century" in New York.
- In March 2011, Luis Miguel received a plaque for his 200 concerts at the National Auditorium in Mexico City (1991–2011).
- In October 2011, Miguel was proclaimed as the best Latin artist of the past 25 years, according to Billboard magazine.
- On February 22, 2012, at the "International Song Festival of Viña del Mar" Miguel was awarded 3 "Gulls" (gold, silver, platinum) and the keys to the city.

== Band ==
- Piano: Francisco Loyo
- Acoustic & Electric Guitar: Todd Robinson
- Bass: Lalo Carrillo
- Keyboards & Programming: Salo Loyo
- Drums: Victor Loyo
- Percussion: Tommy Aros
- Saxophone: Jeff Nathanson
- Saxophone: Terry Landry
- Saxophone: Albert Wing
- Trumpet: Serafin Aguilar
- Trumpet: Ramón Flores
- Trumpet: Peter Olstad
- Trombone: Alejandro Carballo
- Trombone: Arturo Velasco
- Backing Vocals: Kacee Clanton, Vie Le (2010–2011)
