= Amarte Es un Placer =

Amarte Es un Placer may refer to:

- Amarte Es un Placer (album), a 1999 album by Luis Miguel
  - "Amarte Es un Placer" (song), the album's title track
- Amarte Es Un Placer Tour, a concert tour
