= Amarte Es Un Placer Tour =

1999–2000 concert tour by Luis Miguel

- Tour by Luis Miguel
- Associated album: Amarte Es Un Placer
- Start date: September 9, 1999
- End date: May 6, 2000
- Legs: 2
- No. of shows: 59 in North America; 17 in Europe; 23 in South America; 99 total
- Attendance: 1,500,000

Luis Miguel concert chronology
- Romances Tour (1997–98); Amarte Es Un Placer Tour (1999–2000); Mis Romances Tour (2002)

The Amarte Es Un Placer Tour (English: Loving You Is a Pleasure Tour) was a concert tour by Luis Miguel to promote his album Amarte Es Un Placer. This tour had a length of 8 months and ran through Mexico, US, Argentina, Chile, Uruguay, Venezuela, Brazil and Spain between 1999 and 2000. It was the highest-grossing tour ever made by a Spanish-speaking artist, as well as the most extended. The tour consisted of 99 concerts, and was attended by approximately 1.5 million fans. These two records have been broken by another tour of the same artist, the Mexico En La Piel Tour.

== History ==
To promote Amarte Es un Placer, Luis Miguel began his Amarte Es Un Placer Tour on 9 September 1999 in Gijón, Spain. In Madrid, he performed three sold-out shows, and spent a month touring in Spain. His performances in Madrid, Barcelona, Sevilla, Tenerife, and Marbella were among the country's highest grossing shows of 1999. Miguel then toured South America where he performed in Argentina, Brazil, Chile, Uruguay, and Venezuela. In Argentina, he drew more than 50,000 attendees per show at his three concerts in Buenos Aires, and more than 101,800 spectators attended his five shows in Chile, the largest audiences of the year for an artist. The first leg of the tour ended on 11 December 1999 in Maracaibo, Venezuela. A concert was planned for the San Jose Arena in California on New Year's Eve, but was canceled because the gross income would not meet Miguel's requirements.

Miguel commenced the second leg of his tour at the Centennial Garden in Bakersfield, California on 1 February 2000. Two days later, he performed at the Universal Amphitheatre in Los Angeles, California for five consecutive nights drawing more than 24,000 spectators. In the same month, he performed four shows at Radio City Music Hall in New York City and grossed $1.4 million. He also appeared in Minneapolis on 12 February and in Fairfax on 14 February. Following his concerts at Radio City Music Hall, Miguel performed 21 consecutive shows at the National Auditorium in Mexico City beginning on 24 February; beating the previous record of 20 set by Mexican group Timbiriche, and set the record for most attendees with an overall count of 255,000 patrons, another record for the artist. Miguel returned to touring in the United States on 24 March 2000, performed in several cities including Miami, Chicago, Atlantic City, and Houston. He later presented five shows in Monterrey, Mexico from 13 to 17 April 2000, and after a few more performances in the US, ended the tour in San Diego on 6 May 2000. Miguel had the 23rd highest-grossing tour in the country with more than $15.7 million earned from his 44 shows in the US. The tour was recognized by the William Morris Agency as the highest-grossing tour by a Spanish-speaking artist. Miguel was accompanied by a 13-piece band during his tour which included horns, keyboards, guitars, and three female backup singers. His hour-and-a-half show consisted mainly of pop songs and ballads from Amarte Es un Placer and his earlier career, as well as medleys of boleros from the Romance-themed albums. During his concerts in Monterrey, he was joined by Cutberto Pérez's band Mariachi 2000 and performed live covers of Mario De Jesús Báez "Y" and Rubén Fuentes "La Bikina". The shows included a large live-screen behind the stage and featured fireworks and confetti.

== Critical reception ==
The Dallas Morning News writer Mario Tarradell found Miguel's show at the Starplex Pavilion in Dallas to be underwhelming. He panned Miguel's performance of the first bolero medley as "rushed" and "erratic" and observed that the artist "spat out the lyrics, swallowed a few of them, and displayed a childlike hyperactivity in the midst of lush ballads". Tarradell also remarked that Miguel displayed a bizarre behavior during the concert such as using high notes on power ballads (which Tarradell deemed as "totally unnecessary") and was confused by Miguel's decision to do an air guitar while "Bésame Mucho" was being played.

Of Miguel's performances in Los Angeles, The Orange County Register editor Daniel Chang commented that he "delivered a classy show that was as much fun to watch as it was to hear". Chang noted that Miguel "emotes a contagious energy through dramatic facial expressions, fetal-position-like contortions and physical outbursts in time with the music" and complimented his dance moves and the visual sets. Regarding his concert in Houston, Michael D. Clark of the Houston Chronicle said that Miguel "proved, once again, that it isn't necessary to change languages to reach U.S. audiences". He observed that Miguel seemed "determined to balance the upbeat with the overwrought" in contrast to his previous concerts, which were dominated by ballads. Clark was disappointed that the boleros were sung in medleys which did not allow any of them to stand out.

Jon Bream commented in the Star Tribune that Miguel's presentation in Minneapolis was "one of the most ambitious concert spectacles ever presented at the theater" and that the singer had a "captivating presence", but added that Miguel's music was "not particularly distinctive". He likened Miguel's uptempo songs to Earth, Wind & Fire albeit without the "rhythmic and jazzy sophistication", considered his ballads to be "conservative pop, bathed in synthesized strings with Chicago-like horn filigree" and felt let down by Miguel's choice to perform his boleros in medleys.

On 24 October 2000, WEA released the Vivo live album and video from Miguel's concerts in Monterrey. AllMusic editor Perry Seibert gave the video album two-out-of-five stars and criticized its lack of subtitles, closed captions, and supplemental materials, but stated that it should not "dissuade fans of Latino music from checking out this entertaining DVD from Warner Bros".

== Broadcasts and recordings ==
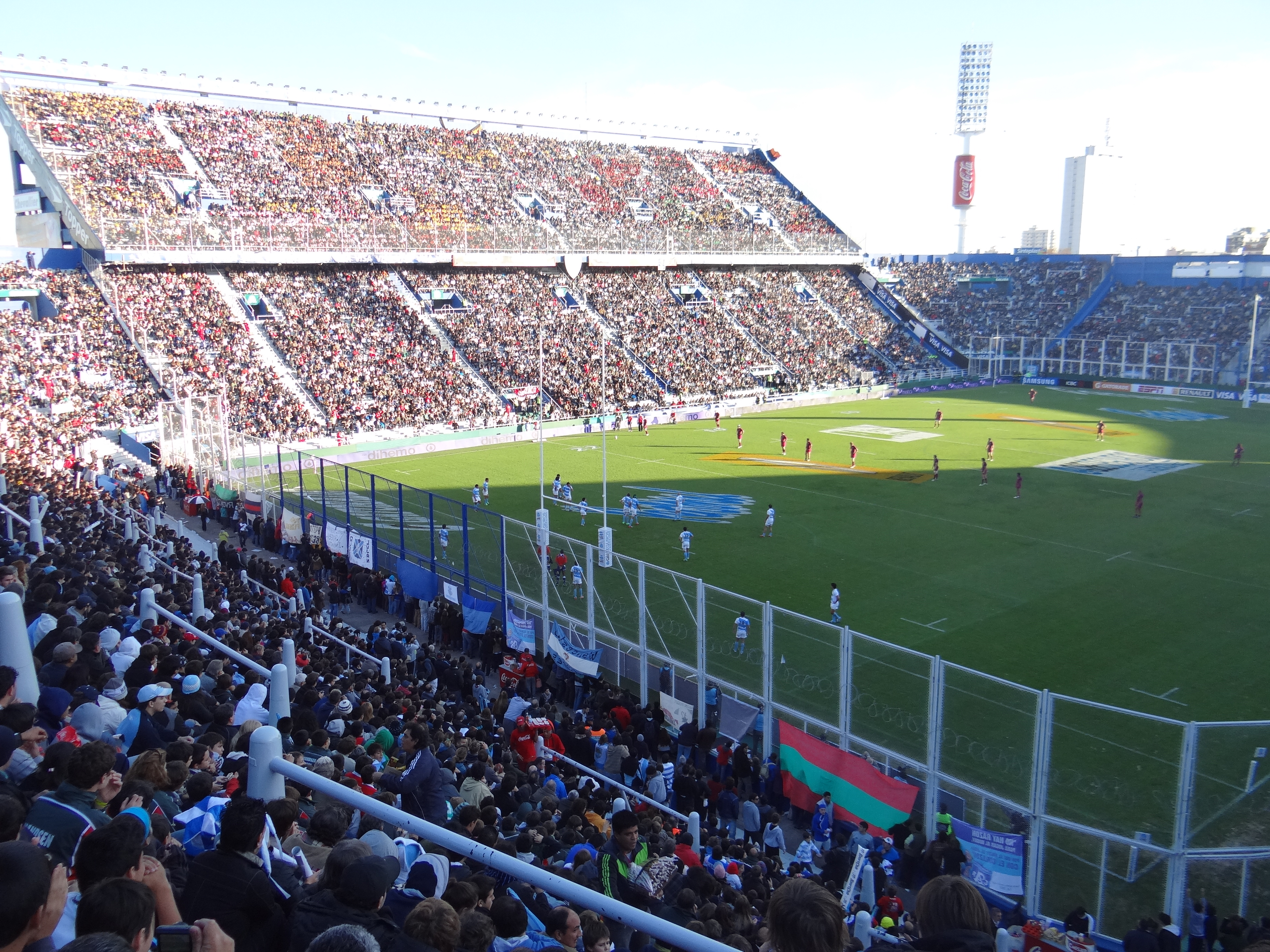
Luis Miguel performed three sold-out shows at José Amalfitani Stadium gathering a total of 150,000 spectators.

Was launched a CD and DVD, titled Vivo, the CD was released on October 3, 2000, while the video album was released on October 24. It was filmed at the Auditorio Coca-Cola concert hall in Monterrey, Mexico, where Miguel performed from 13 to 17 April 2000, as part of the second leg of his tour. Vivo is the first Spanish-language live album to be released on NTSC, PAL, and DVD formats. The audio version was produced by Miguel while David Mallet directed the video album. Miguel's renditions of "Y" and "La Bikina", which he specifically performed during the concert shows in Mexico where he was joined by Cutberto Pérez's band Mariachi 2000, made available as singles for the album.

Miguel received several accolades, including a Grammy nomination for Best Latin Pop Album and a Latin Grammy nomination for Best Male Pop Vocal Album. Commercially, the album peaked at number two on the albums chart in Spain and on the Billboard Top Latin Albums chart in the United States. It also topped the albums chart in Argentina and was certified double Platinum and triple Platinum and Gold in Mexico.

On the first leg of the tour, in Argentina Canal 13 aired a 90-minute special with the complete show of November 5, 1999 at José Amalfitani Stadium, with a 50,000 sold-out. Also in Chile the November 20 show at Estadio Nacional was fully recorded, for a partial 60-minute transmission a few days later by UC13.

== Set list ==
Leg 1 (September 9, 1999 – December 11, 1999)

No.	Title	Original album	Length
1.	"Intro"
2.	"Quiero"	Amarte Es Un Placer
3.	"Tú, Solo Tú"	Amarte Es Un Placer
4.	"J.C. Calderón" (Entrégate / Tengo Todo Excepto a Ti / La Incondicional)	20 Años, Busca Una Mujer
5.	"Up-tempo Medley" (Un Hombre Busca Una Mujer / Cuestión De Piel / Oro De Ley)	Busca Una Mujer, 20 Años
6.	"Romance" (No Me Platiques Más / No Sé Tú / La Puerta / La Barca / Inolvidable)	Romance
7.	"Suave"	Aries
8.	"Dame"	Nada Es Igual
9.	"Interlude [Armonica]"
10.	"Dormir Contigo (only in selected dates in South America)"	Amarte Es Un Placer
11.	"Segundo Romance" (El Día Que Me Quieras / Solamente Una Vez / Somos Novios / Todo Y Nada / Nosotros)	Segundo Romance
12.	"O Tú o Ninguna"	Amarte Es Un Placer
13.	"Sol, Arena y Mar"	Amarte Es Un Placer
14.	"Romances" (Voy A Apagar La Luz / Contigo Aprendi / Por Debajo de la Mesa / El Reloj / Sabor a Mí / La Gloria Eres Tú / Bésame Mucho)	Romances
15.	"Cómo Es Posible Que a Mi Lado"	Nada Es Igual
16.	"Será Que No Me Amas"	20 Años
17.	"Te Propongo Esta Noche"	Amarte Es Un Placer

Leg 2 (February 1, 2000 – May 6, 2000)

No.	Title	Original album	Length
1.	"Intro"
2.	"Quiero"	Amarte Es Un Placer
3.	"Tú, Solo Tú"	Amarte Es Un Placer
4.	"J.C. Calderón" (Entrégate / Tengo Todo Excepto A Ti / La Incondicional)	20 Años, Busca Una Mujer
5.	"Up-tempo Medley" (Un Hombre Busca Una Mujer / Cuestión De Piel / Oro De Ley)	Busca Una Mujer, 20 Años
6.	"Romance" (No Me Platiques Más / No Sé Tú / La Puerta / La Barca / Inolvidable)	Romance
7.	"Suave"	Aries
8.	"Interlude [Armonica]"
9.	"Segundo Romance" (El Día Que Me Quieras / Solamente Una Vez / Somos Novios / Todo Y Nada / Nosotros)	Segundo Romance
10.	"O Tú, O Ninguna"	Amarte Es Un Placer
11.	"Sol, Arena Y Mar"	Amarte Es Un Placer
12.	"Romances" (Voy A Apagar La Luz / Contigo Aprendi / Por Debajo De La Mesa / El Reloj / Sabor A Mi / La Gloria Eres Tú / Bésame Mucho)	Romances
13.	"Y (only in Mexico)"	never released by the artist
14.	"La Bikina (only in Mexico)"	never released by the artist
15.	"Cómo Es Posible Que A Mi Lado"	Nada Es Igual
16.	"Será Que No Me Amas"	20 Años
17.	"Te Propongo Esta Noche"	Amarte Es Un Placer

== Tour dates ==
List of concerts, showing date, city, country, venue, tickets sold, number of available tickets, and amount of gross revenue
Date	City	Country	Venue	Attendance	Revenue
Europe - Leg 1
September 9, 1999	Gijón	Spain	Palacio de Deportes de Gijón	—N/a	—N/a
September 11, 1999	Pamplona	Spain	Plaza de Toros de Pamplona	—N/a	—N/a
September 15, 1999	Madrid	Spain	Plaza de Toros Las Ventas	44,641	—N/a
September 16, 1999	Madrid	Spain	Plaza de Toros Las Ventas	44,641	—N/a
September 17, 1999	Madrid	Spain	Plaza de Toros Las Ventas	44,641	—N/a
September 20, 1999	Vigo	Spain	Auditorio de Castrelos	—N/a	—N/a
September 22, 1999	Valladolid	Spain	Estadio José Zorrilla	—N/a	—N/a
September 25, 1999	Marbella	Spain	Estadio Municipal de Marbella	12,000	—N/a
September 26, 1999	Cartagena	Spain	Estadio Cartagonova	—N/a	—N/a
October 1, 1999	Valencia	Spain	Plaza de Toros de Valencia	—N/a	—N/a
October 2, 1999	Valencia	Spain	Plaza de Toros de Valencia	—N/a	—N/a
October 5, 1999	Barcelona	Spain	Palau Sant Jordi	26,297	—N/a
October 6, 1999	Barcelona	Spain	Palau Sant Jordi	26,297	—N/a
October 9, 1999 (Note: The October 9, 1999 concert at Estadio Olímpico de la Cartuja in Seville was originally scheduled to take place on September 24, 1999, but was postponed due to "logistical problems".)	Seville	Spain	Estadio Olímpico de la Cartuja	20,150	—N/a
October 11, 1999	Zaragoza	Spain	Pabellón Príncipe Felipe	—N/a	—N/a
October 12, 1999	Zaragoza	Spain	Pabellón Príncipe Felipe	—N/a	—N/a
October 16, 1999	Tenerife	Spain	Recinto Portuario	16,000	—N/a
South America					—N/a
October 28, 1999	São Paulo	Brazil	Credicard Hall	—N/a	—N/a
October 29, 1999	São Paulo	Brazil	Credicard Hall	—N/a	—N/a
October 30, 1999	São Paulo	Brazil	Credicard Hall	—N/a	—N/a
November 1, 1999	Rio de Janeiro	Brazil	Arena Metropolitan	—N/a	—N/a
November 2, 1999	Rio de Janeiro	Brazil	Arena Metropolitan	—N/a	—N/a
November 5, 1999	Buenos Aires	Argentina	Estadio Vélez Sarsfield	—N/a	—N/a
November 6, 1999	Buenos Aires	Argentina	Estadio Vélez Sarsfield	—N/a	—N/a
November 7, 1999	Buenos Aires	Argentina	Estadio Vélez Sarsfield	—N/a	—N/a
November 10, 1999	Rosario	Argentina	Estadio Rosario Central	—N/a	—N/a
November 12, 1999	Córdoba	Argentina	Estadio Chateau Carrera	—N/a	—N/a
November 14, 1999	Salta	Argentina	Estadio El Gigante del Norte	—N/a	—N/a
November 16, 1999	Mendoza	Argentina	Estadio Malvinas Argentinas	—N/a	—N/a
November 18, 1999	San Juan	Argentina	Estadio 27 de Septiembre	—N/a	—N/a
November 20, 1999	Santiago	Chile	Estadio Nacional	—N/a	—N/a
November 21, 1999	Viña del Mar	Chile	Anfiteatro de la Quinta Vergara	—N/a	—N/a
November 22, 1999 (Note: Gala show for 2,500 people)	Santiago	Chile	Estadio San Carlos de Apoquindo	—N/a	—N/a
November 24, 1999	Antofagasta	Chile	Estadio Regional de Antofagasta	—N/a	—N/a
November 27, 1999	Temuco	Chile	Estadio Municipal Germán Becker	—N/a	—N/a
December 1, 1999	Quilmes	Argentina	Estadio Quilmes	—N/a	—N/a
December 3, 1999	Montevideo	Uruguay	Estadio Centenario	—N/a	—N/a
December 8, 1999	Caracas	Venezuela	Poliedro de Caracas	—N/a	—N/a
December 9, 1999	Caracas	Venezuela	Poliedro de Caracas	—N/a	—N/a
December 11, 1999	Maracaibo	Venezuela	Plaza Monumental	—N/a	—N/a
North America - Leg 2
February 1, 2000	Bakersfield	United States	Centennial Garden	3,477 / 4,411	$107,560
February 3, 2000	Los Angeles	United States	Universal Amphitheater	24,012 / 27,416	$1,580,042
February 4, 2000	Los Angeles	United States	Universal Amphitheater	24,012 / 27,416	$1,580,042
February 5, 2000	Los Angeles	United States	Universal Amphitheater	24,012 / 27,416	$1,580,042
February 6, 2000	Los Angeles	United States	Universal Amphitheater	24,012 / 27,416	$1,580,042
February 7, 2000	Los Angeles	United States	Universal Amphitheater	24,012 / 27,416	$1,580,042
February 12, 2000	Minneapolis	United States	Orpheum Theatre	1,770 / 2,161	$113,660
February 14, 2000	Fairfax	United States	Patriot Center	3,173 / 5,823	$122,550
February 16, 2000	New York City	United States	Radio City Music Hall	18,947 / 24,052	$1,367,140
February 17, 2000	New York City	United States	Radio City Music Hall	18,947 / 24,052	$1,367,140
February 18, 2000	New York City	United States	Radio City Music Hall	18,947 / 24,052	$1,367,140
February 19, 2000	New York City	United States	Radio City Music Hall	18,947 / 24,052	$1,367,140
February 24, 2000	Mexico City	Mexico	National Auditorium	183,688 / 203,343	$8,340,209
February 25, 2000	Mexico City	Mexico	National Auditorium	183,688 / 203,343	$8,340,209
February 26, 2000	Mexico City	Mexico	National Auditorium	183,688 / 203,343	$8,340,209
February 27, 2000	Mexico City	Mexico	National Auditorium	183,688 / 203,343	$8,340,209
March 1, 2000	Mexico City	Mexico	National Auditorium	183,688 / 203,343	$8,340,209
March 2, 2000	Mexico City	Mexico	National Auditorium	183,688 / 203,343	$8,340,209
March 3, 2000	Mexico City	Mexico	National Auditorium	183,688 / 203,343	$8,340,209
March 4, 2000	Mexico City	Mexico	National Auditorium	183,688 / 203,343	$8,340,209
March 5, 2000	Mexico City	Mexico	National Auditorium	183,688 / 203,343	$8,340,209
March 6, 2000	Mexico City	Mexico	National Auditorium	183,688 / 203,343	$8,340,209
March 8, 2000	Mexico City	Mexico	National Auditorium	183,688 / 203,343	$8,340,209
March 9, 2000	Mexico City	Mexico	National Auditorium	183,688 / 203,343	$8,340,209
March 10, 2000	Mexico City	Mexico	National Auditorium	183,688 / 203,343	$8,340,209
March 11, 2000	Mexico City	Mexico	National Auditorium	183,688 / 203,343	$8,340,209
March 12, 2000	Mexico City	Mexico	National Auditorium	183,688 / 203,343	$8,340,209
March 15, 2000	Mexico City	Mexico	National Auditorium	183,688 / 203,343	$8,340,209
March 16, 2000	Mexico City	Mexico	National Auditorium	183,688 / 203,343	$8,340,209
March 17, 2000	Mexico City	Mexico	National Auditorium	183,688 / 203,343	$8,340,209
March 18, 2000	Mexico City	Mexico	National Auditorium	183,688 / 203,343	$8,340,209
March 19, 2000	Mexico City	Mexico	National Auditorium	183,688 / 203,343	$8,340,209
March 20, 2000	Mexico City	Mexico	National Auditorium	183,688 / 203,343	$8,340,209
March 24, 2000	Miami	United States	American Airlines Arena	18,849 / 20,000	$1,177,437
March 25, 2000	Miami	United States	American Airlines Arena	18,849 / 20,000	$1,177,437
March 26, 2000	Lakeland	United States	Jenkins Arena	2,269 / 2,269	$128,526
March 28, 2000	Chicago	United States	United Center	7,328 / 10,000	$550,075
March 31, 2000	Lowell	United States	Tsongas Arena	4,175 / 6,161	$214,480
April 1, 2000	Atlantic City	United States	Mark G. Etess Arena	—N/a	—N/a
April 5, 2000	South Padre Island	United States	SP Convention Center	—N/a	—N/a
April 6, 2000	South Padre Island	United States	SP Convention Center	—N/a	—N/a
April 7, 2000	San Antonio	United States	Alamodome	9,539 / 15,000	$577,486
April 10, 2000	Houston	United States	Compaq Center	9,241 / 10,843	$571,885
April 13, 2000 (Note: The shows of April 13, 14, 15, 16 and 17 in Monterrey was recorded and later released in a DVD as Vivo.)	Monterrey	Mexico	Auditorio Coca-Cola	56,754 / 75,000	$1,954,548
April 14, 2000	Monterrey	Mexico	Auditorio Coca-Cola	56,754 / 75,000	$1,954,548
April 15, 2000	Monterrey	Mexico	Auditorio Coca-Cola	56,754 / 75,000	$1,954,548
April 16, 2000	Monterrey	Mexico	Auditorio Coca-Cola	56,754 / 75,000	$1,954,548
April 17, 2000	Monterrey	Mexico	Auditorio Coca-Cola	56,754 / 75,000	$1,954,548
April 19, 2000	Dallas	United States	Starplex Amphitheatre	4,369 / 5,200	$298,264
April 21, 2000	El Paso	United States	Don Haskins Center	11,352 / 18,000	$740,411
April 22, 2000	El Paso	United States	Don Haskins Center	11,352 / 18,000	$740,411
April 25, 2000 (Note: The April 25, 2000 concert at Magness Arena in Denver was originally scheduled to take place on February 9, 2000, but was cancelled and postponed due to "family problems".)	Denver	United States	Magness Arena	2,561 / 5,000	$149,985
April 27, 2000	Anaheim	United States	Arrowhead Pond	8,760 / 10,352	$385,520
April 28, 2000	San Jose	United States	San Jose Arena	6,264 / 11,647	$450,245
April 29, 2000	Las Vegas	United States	Mandalay Bay Events Center	5,779 / 7,988	$474,410
May 2, 2000	Tucson	United States	TCC Arena	3,011 / 6,000	$219,248
May 3, 2000	Phoenix	United States	Desert Sky Pavilion	10,944 / 19,634	$142,984
May 5, 2000 (Note: The May 5, 2000 concert at Cox Arena in San Diego was originally scheduled to take place on January 28, 2000, but was postponed due to "logistical problems".)	San Diego	United States	Cox Arena	8,398 / 8,398	$541,656
May 6, 2000	Chula Vista	United States	Coors Amphitheatre	6,613 / 10,000	$407,047
Total				411,273 / 508,698 (80,8%)	$20,615,368

== Cancelled shows ==
List of cancelled concerts, showing date, city, country, venue, and reason for cancellation
Date	City	Country	Venue	Reason
October 29, 1999	San Bernardino	Paraguay	Anfiteatro José Asunción Flores	Logistical Problems
December 9, 1999	Valencia	Venezuela	Forum de Valencia	Vargas tragedy
April 30, 2000	Fresno	United States	Selland Arena	Unknown

== Tour personnel ==
Personnel adapted from Allmusic and as per Vivo DVD end credits.

=== Performance credits ===
Band

- Luis Miguel - Vocals
- Francisco Loyo - Piano, Keyboards
- Victor Loyo - Drums
- Gerardo Carrillo - Bass
- Todd Robinson - Acoustic guitar, Electric guitar
- Tommy Aros - Percussion
- Arturo Pérez - Keyboards
- Francisco Abonce - Trumpet
- Juan Arpero - Trumpet
- Alex Carballo - Trombone
- Jeff Nathanson - Saxophone
- Julie Bond - Backing Vocals
- Naja Barnes - Backing Vocals
- Carmel Cooper - Backing Vocals

Mariachi 2000

- Cutberto Pérez - Director, Trumpet
- Juan Guzmán Acevedo - Trumpet
- Juan Carlos Navarro - Guitar
- Miguel Darío González - Guitarrón
- Juan Carlos Girón - Vihuela
- Hugo Santiago Ramírez - Violin
- Mauricio Ramos - Violin
- Pedro García - Violin
- José Ignacio Vázquez - Violin
- Petronilo Godinez - Violin
- Benjamín Rosas - Violin
- José Eloy Guerrero - Violin
- Julio de Santiago - Violin

=== Technical credits ===
- Chris Littleton - Tour Manager
- Marco Gamboa - Programming and Sequence
- Roberto Ruiz - Road Manager Band
- Steve "Chopper" Borges - Production Manager
- Randy "RT" Townsend - Stage Manager
- Dave Howard - Tour Counter
- Edith Sánchez - LM Wardrobe
- Abigail Potter - Tour Manager Assistant
- Suzanne Graham - Wardrobe and Catering
- Joe Madera - Security Boss
- Jim Yakabuski - Room Engineer
- Mike Jones - LM Monitors
- Carlos Duarte - Band Monitors
- Fabián Boggino - Lights Director
- Pat Brannon - Light Crew Boss
- Connie Paulson - High End Technical
- Greg Walker - Dimmer Technical
- Kurt Springer - V-Dosc Crew Boss
- Fumi Okazaki - Sound
- Son Nishimura - Sound
- Toshio Kumagai - Sound
- Mick Anger - Video Director
- Michael Caron - Video Crew Boss
- Jim Smyk - Video Engineer
- Phil Evans - Led Screen Technical
- Sam Herrington - Carpenter Boss
- Richard Brisson - Pyrotechnic
