= Sol, Arena y Mar =

Single by Luis Miguel

from the album Amarte Es un Placer
- Released: 19 July 1999
- Studio: A&M Studios; Cello Studios; Ocean Way Recording; Watersound; Record Plant (Hollywood, California)
- Genre: Pop; jazz
- Length: 3:18
- Label: WEA Latina
- Songwriters: Luis Miguel; Arturo Perez; Francisco Loyo; Salo Loyo
- Producer: Luis Miguel

Luis Miguel singles chronology
"La Gloria Eres Tú" (1998)	"Sol, Arena y Mar" (1999)	"O Tú o Ninguna" (1999)

"Sol, Arena y Mar" (English: "Sun, Sand, and Sea") is a song written by Arturo Perez, Francisco Loyo, and Salo Loyo and co-written, produced, and performed by Mexican singer Luis Miguel. It is a horn-driven uptempo pop song with jazz influence which deals with a strained relationship. The song's lyrics were rumored to have been influenced by Miguel's previous relationship with Daisy Fuentes. It was released as the lead single from the album Amarte Es un Placer on 19 July 1999.

The song received mixed reviews from music critics. Several reviewers complimented Miguel's delivery and favorably compared it to the uptempo tracks from Aries (1993) while others criticized its horn arrangements and lyrics. It received a BMI Latin Award in 2001. The single peaked at number three on the Billboard Hot Latin Songs chart in the United States, number two in Spain, and reached number one in Argentina, Chile, and Mexico and sold over 50,000 copies since its release.

== Background and composition ==
In 1997, Luis Miguel released his twelfth studio album Romances, the third record in his Romance series on which he covers classic Latin American boleros. It sold over 4.5 million copies and won the Grammy Award for Best Latin Pop Performance in 1998. To promote Romances, he embarked on a tour of the United States, Latin America, and Spain lasting over a year. By 1998, Miguel was considered the most popular Latin artist internationally and his albums had sold over 35 million copies worldwide. Miguel began a relationship with American singer Mariah Carey the following year. After an absence of two years on the music scene, Miguel announced on 19 July 1999 that he would release a new album by September. On the same day, he also released the album's first single "Sol, Arena y Mar". Four versions of the single were released which includes the album version and three remixes done by Danny Saber. He said the upcoming album would be a return to pop as opposed to the bolero cover versions he had recorded on the Romance series. He also denied rumors that he was planning to record a duet with Carey. The album's final title, Amarte Es un Placer was announced on 17 August 1999.

Miguel confirmed that it was the first album where he was more involved in the tracks' composition. In addition to Miguel co-writing several of the record's tracks, he was assisted by other composers including Armando Manzanero, Juan Carlos Calderón, and Arturo Perez. Recording took place at the A&M Studios, Cello Studios, Ocean Way Recording, Watersound, and the Record Plant in Hollywood, California with Miguel handling the production himself.

Luis Miguel "Sol, Arena y Mar"
A 19 second sample of Miguel's "Sol, Arena y Mar", the lead single from the album. Ramiro Burr of the San Antonio Express-News noted the song uses a "fiery fusion of big horns and jazz-inflected dance rhythms".

"Sol, Arena y Mar" is a horn-driven pop track with jazz influences which describes the "pain of separation" of a love that "disappeared as quickly as the foam at the seashore". It was composed by Miguel, Arturo Perez, Francisco Loyo, and Salo Loyo. The song's lyrics was rumored to have been based on Miguel's previous relationship with Daisy Fuentes. A live version of "Sol, Arena y Mar" was included on the album Vivo (2000). The track was also added to the compilation album Grandes Éxitos (2005).

== Reception ==
"Sol, Arena y Mar" was met with mixed reviews by music critics. AllMusic editor Jose F. Promis felt the horn arrangements gave the song a "jazzy, sophisticated, adult-leaning feel." John Lannert of Billboard was unimpressed with the track calling it a "vapid, uptempo number about a downtrodden affair" and criticized its "weary arrangements and uninspired musicianship". Houston Chronicle critic Joey Guerra chided the tune as a "tepid mix of blaring horns and uninspired lyrics". Newsday editor Richard Torres stated that Miguel's vocals "provides perfect counterpoint to the peppy horn arrangement" on the song. Leila Cobo of the Miami Herald editor noted that "Sol, Arena y Mar" was similar to the uptempo tracks from Aries.

The Dallas Morning News critic Mario Tarradell called "Sol, Arena y Mar" a "guilty pleasure" and found it to be the "most reminiscent of the catchy fare on 1993's wonderful Aries". Ernesto Lechner wrote for the Los Angeles Times that the song lacks "the sophistication that defines most pop today". Ramiro Burr of the San Antonio Express-News praised the track stating that the "sensuous horns are marvelous, the sweeping vocal harmonies enticing, but it's Luis Miguel's piercing tenor that grabs you" "Sol, Arena y Mar" was recognized as one of the best-performing Latin songs of the year at the 2001 BMI Latin Awards.

In the United States, "Sol, Arena y Mar" debuted at number eight on the Billboard Hot Latin Songs chart on the week of 21 August 1999. It peaked at number three on the chart two weeks later. The track also peaked at number two on the Latin Pop Songs chart with the number one position being held by Ricky Martin's song "Bella". In Spain, the remix version of the track peaked at number two, and was the 20th best selling CD-Single of 1999. The song reached number one in Argentina, Chile, and Mexico. The single was sold over 50,000 copies the first day of its release, and two million almost two months after.

== Format and track listing ==
CD Single

1. "Sol, Arena y Mar" (radio version) – 3:19
2. "Sol, Arena y Mar" (club remix) – 4:34
3. "Sol, Arena y Mar" (club remix - instrumental) – 4:34
4. "Sol, Arena y Mar" (Danny Saber remix) – 4:23

== Charts ==
=== Weekly charts ===
Chart (1999)	Peak position
Guatemala (Notimex)	3
Spain (Promusicae)	2
US Hot Latin Songs (Billboard)	3
US Latin Pop Airplay (Billboard)	2

=== Year-end charts ===
Chart (1999)	Position
Spain (PROMUSICAE)	20

== Personnel ==
Credits adapted from the Amarte Es un Placer liner notes.

- Luis Miguel – producer, lyrics, vocals
- Francisco Loyo – music, arrangement
- Salo Loyo – music
- Arturo Perez – lyrics
- Jerry Hey – brass arrangement

== See also ==
- List of best-selling Latin singles
