= Dormir Contigo =

2000 song by Luis Miguel

Single by Luis Miguel

from the album Amarte Es un Placer
- Released: January 2000
- Studio: A&M Studios; Cello Studios; Ocean Way Recording; Watersound; Record Plant (Hollywood, California)
- Genre: Pop
- Length: 4:15
- Label: WEA Latina
- Songwriter: Armando Manzanero
- Producer: Luis Miguel

Luis Miguel singles chronology
"O Tú o Ninguna" (1999)	"Dormir Contigo" (2000)	"Amarte Es un Placer" (2000)

"Dormir Contigo" (English: "Sleeping With You") is a song written by Armando Manzanero and produced and performed by Mexican singer Luis Miguel. The song is a pop ballad in which the protagonist expresses the joy of sleeping with his partner. It was released as the third single from the album Amarte Es un Placer in January 2000. The track peaked at number 11 Billboard Hot Latin Songs chart in the United States and number two on the Latin Pop Songs chart.

"Dormir Contigo" received positive reviews from music critics who consider it to be one of the best tracks on the album. Manzanero received a BMI Latin Award for the track in 2000. A promotional music video for "Dormir Contigo" was released and features Miguel performing the song live during the first leg of his Amarte Es Un Placer Tour in 1999.

== Background and composition ==
Luis Miguel "Dormir Contigo"
A sample of "Dormir Contigo", one of the three songs composed by Armando Manzanero for the record. The track features an orchestra in the background which is also present on the other ballads on Amarte Es un Placer.

In 1997, Luis Miguel released his twelfth studio album Romances, the third record in his Romance series on which he covers classic Latin American boleros. It sold over 4.5 million copies and won the Grammy Award for Best Latin Pop Performance in 1998. To promote Romances, he embarked on a tour of the United States, Latin America, and Spain lasting over a year. By 1998, Miguel was considered the most popular Latin artist internationally and his albums had sold over 35 million copies worldwide. Miguel began a relationship with American singer Mariah Carey the following year. After an absence of two years on the music scene, Miguel announced on 19 July 1999 that he would release a new album by September. He said the upcoming album would be a return to pop recordings as opposed to the bolero cover versions he had recorded on the Romance series. He denied rumors that he was planning to record a duet with Carey. The album's final title, Amarte Es un Placer was announced on 17 August 1999.

Miguel confirmed that it was the first album where he was more involved in the tracks' composition. In addition to Miguel co-writing several of the record's tracks, he was assisted by other composers including Armando Manzanero, Juan Carlos Calderón, and Arturo Perez. Recording took place at the A&M Studios, Cello Studios, Ocean Way Recording, Watersound, and the Record Plant in Hollywood, California with Miguel handling the productions himself.

"Dormir Contigo" is a "pop ballad" composed by Manzanero. In the lyrics, the protagonist describes the joy of sleeping with his lover. According to Manzanero, it is one of his two favorite songs that he has composed for Miguel (the other being "Por Debajo de la Mesa"). It was released as the third single from Amarte Es un Placer in January 2000. Miguel performed the song live during the first leg of his Amarte Es Un Placer Tour in 1999. Miguel's performance of the song during the tour was released as a promotional music video.

== Reception ==
Leila Cobo of the Miami Herald called "Dormir Contigo" "beautiful" and mentioned that it has "some of the few memorable lyrics" on Amarte Es un Placer. The Dallas Morning News editor Mario Tarradell regarded "Dormir Contigo" as one of the "sensual and solemn ballads" on the album. Similarly, John Lannert of Billboard magazine considered the track to be one of the "pair of moving romantic ballads" (the other being "Soy Yo" which Manzanero also composed). Richard Torres of Newsday cited the ballad as one of the best tracks on the record. The track was recognized as one of the best performing Latin songs of the year at the BMI Latin Awards in 2002.

In the United States, "Dormir Contigo" debuted at number 16 on the Billboard Hot Latin Songs chart on the week of 1 January 2000. It peaked at number 11 five weeks later. The track also peaked at number two on the Latin Pop Songs chart (the number one position was held by Ricardo Arjona's song "Desnuda").

== Charts ==
Chart (2000)	Peak position
US Hot Latin Songs (Billboard)	11
US Latin Pop Airplay (Billboard)	2

== Personnel ==
Credits adapted from the Amarte Es un Placer liner notes.

- Luis Miguel – producer, vocals
- Armando Manzanero – songwriter
- Bill Ross – arranger
- Francisco Loyo – rhythm arranger
