= Vivo (Luis Miguel album) =

Live album and Video by Luis Miguel
- Released: 3 October 2000
- Recorded: 14–15 April 2000
- Venues: Auditorio Coca-Cola (Monterrey, Nuevo León)
- Genres: Pop; R&B; bolero; mariachi
- Length: 96:47
- Language: Spanish
- Label: WEA Latina
- Director: David Mallet
- Producer: Luis Miguel

Luis Miguel chronology
Amarte Es un Placer (1999)	Vivo (2000)	Mis Romances (2001)

Luis Miguel video chronology
Los Videos (1997)	Vivo (2000)	Mis Boleros Favoritos (2002)

Singles from Vivo
- 1. "La Bikina" Released: 15 September 2000; 2. "Y" Released: 14 November 2000

Vivo (English: Live) is the third live album by Mexican singer Luis Miguel. It was filmed at the Auditorio Coca-Cola concert hall in Monterrey, Mexico, where Miguel performed from 13 to 17 April 2000, as part of the second leg of his Amarte Es Un Placer Tour. Vivo was released in a live audio CD, DVD and VHS format. Vivo is the first Spanish-language live album to be released on NTSC, PAL, and DVD formats. The audio version was produced by Miguel while David Mallet directed the video album. The audio disc was released on 3 October 2000, while the video album was released on 24 October. Miguel's renditions of "Y" and "La Bikina", which he specifically performed during the concert shows in Mexico where he was joined by Cutberto Pérez's band Mariachi 2000, made available as singles for the album.

After its release, Vivo received generally favorable reviews from critics, who praised Miguel's vocals, his live performances of his tracks, and the mariachi songs. One reviewer, however, criticized the video album's lack of subtitles, closed captions, and supplemental materials. Miguel received several accolades, including a Grammy nomination for Best Latin Pop Album and a Latin Grammy nomination for Best Male Pop Vocal Album. Commercially, the album peaked at number two on the albums chart in Spain and on the Billboard Top Latin Albums chart in the United States. It also topped the albums chart in Argentina and was certified triple Platinum and Gold in Mexico.

== Background and release ==
Luis Miguel "La Bikina"
A 17 second sample of Miguel's live cover of Rubén Fuentes's "La Bikina" where he was accompanied by Mariachi 2000. The Dallas Morning News editor Mario Tarradell notes that the band "adds glorious stringed and brassy instruments and robust vocalizations".

In 1999, Luis Miguel released his thirteenth studio album Amarte Es un Placer. To further promote the record, he launched the Amarte Es Un Placer Tour which lasted from 1999 into 2000. As part of the second leg of his tour, Miguel presented five shows at the Auditorio Coca-Cola in Monterrey, Mexico from 13 to 17 April 2000, and drew over 50,000 spectators. Miguel was accompanied by a 13-piece band during his tour which included horns, keyboards, guitars and three female backup singers. His hour-and-a-half show consisted mainly of pop songs and ballads from Amarte Es un Placer and his earlier career, as well as medleys of boleros from the Romance-themed albums. During his concerts in Monterrey, he was joined by Cutbert Pérez's band Mariachi 2000 and performed live covers of "Y" and "La Bikina", which were made available as singles for Vivo.

Miguel's concerts in Monterrey were recorded for Vivo. Miguel produced the album himself while the video was directed by David Mallet. The audio disc for the album was released on 3 October 2000 while the video album was launched on VHS and DVD on 24 October. It is first the Spanish-language live album to be released on NTSC, PAL, and DVD formats. "La Bikina" was released as the lead single from the album 15 September 2000. A writer for La Opinión noted that the release day was likely meant to coincide with the Mexican Independence Day. It peaked at number two in Honduras on the Billboard Hot Latin Songs in the United States, three in Chile, Costa Rica, El Salvador, and topped the Uruguayn charts. "Y" was released as the album's second single on 14 November 2000 and peaked at number eight on the Hot Latin Songs chart. The live renditions of "Quiero" and "Cómo Es Posible Que a Mi Lado" were also released as a promo single in Colombia in 2001.

== Reception ==
Professional ratings
Review scores
Source	Rating
AllMusic	(video) (audio)
The Dallas Morning News	B
Los Angeles Daily News	4/4 stars

After its release, Vivo received generally positive reviews from music critics. AllMusic reviewer Perry Seibert gave the video album two out of five stars and criticized its lack of subtitles, closed captions, and supplemental materials, but stated that it should not "dissuade fans of Latino music from checking out this entertaining DVD from Warner Bros". The audio version itself was rated three out of five stars by an editor of AllMusic. Billboard editor Leila Cobo complimented Miguel's vocals and praised the "truly spectacular" tracks on Vivo including "La Bikina". However Cobo felt that he was "less convincing" on "Quiero" and "Tú, Sólo Tú", which she regarded "stuck-in-the-'s 80s funk/disco nuances", due to Miguel taking it "all so seriously". Mario Tarradell of The Dallas Morning News gave the album a "B" rating complimenting the record's "crisp, clean" sound, Miguel's "melodic voice", Mariachi 2000's participation on "La Bikina" which Tarradell calls the best track on Vivo. Tarradell also lauded the live renditions of "Quiero" and "Suave" as "pleasurable". However, he opined Miguel "milked the whole Latin standards thing too long" on the Romance medleys.

The Los Angeles Daily News critic Sandra Barrera rated Vivo four out of four stars commenting while the album may be viewed as "another attempt by the record-breaking artist at glorifying himself as the king of Latin pop prima donnas", she noted that it "doesn't detract from the gorgeous body of work". She also thought all of the record's tracks "represent the best of Miguel" and noted the Romance medleys "best illustrate why Miguel is the top-selling pop singer in Latin America". Richard Torres of Newsday wrote a positive review of the record noting Miguel's vocals are "deeper and gruffer than on his studio albums" which he felt gives the uptempo songs "a deeper, funkier edge". He praised Miguel's ballads "sublime", the bolero medleys, and the mariachi songs, concluding: "Miguel's the best purveyor of love songs around, and Vivo captures the best at his best."

At the 43rd Annual Grammy Awards in 2001, Vivo received a nomination for Best Latin Pop Album, which went to MTV Unplugged (2000) by Shakira. At the 2nd Annual Latin Grammy Awards in the same year, it was nominated Best Male Pop Vocal Album which was awarded to El Alma al Aire (2000) by Alejandro Sanz. At the 13th Annual Lo Nuestro Awards in 2001, Vivo was nominated Pop Album of the Year but lost to Paulina (2000) by Paulina Rubio. It was also nominated Album of the Year at the 2001 El Premio de la Gente Ritmo Latino Music Awards which also lost to Paulina. At the 2001 Billboard Latin Music Awards, Miguel won the award for Pop Album of the Year by a Male Artist.

== Commercial performance ==
In the United States, Vivo debuted and peaked at number two on the Billboard Top Latin Albums chart on the week of 21 October 2000 with Mi Reflejo (2000) by Christina Aguilera holding off the number one position. The album also peaked at 93 on the Billboard 200 chart and number two on the Latin Pop Albums chart. It was certified double Platinum in the Latin field in America by the Recording Industry Association of America (RIAA) for shipments of 200,000 copies and ended 2001 as the ninth best-selling Latin album of the year. In Argentina, Vivo debuted atop the albums chart and the disc was certified double Platinum by the Argentine Chamber of Phonograms and Videograms Producers for shipping 120,000 copies while the video received Platinum certification for shipments of 8,000 copies. In Spain, it peaked at number two on the albums chart and was certified triple Platinum by the Productores de Música de España for shipping 300,000 copies. In Mexico, the record was awarded Platinum and Gold for shipping 525,000 units and the video received a Gold certification in Brazil sales of 25,000 copies.

== Track listing ==
Video
No.	Title	Writer(s)	Length
1.	"Intro"		2:34
2.	"Quiero"	Luis Miguel; Roland Kortbawi; Francisco Loyo; Alejandro Asensi	4:01
3.	"Tú, Sólo Tú"	Miguel; Arturo Pérez	3:33
4.	"J.C. Calderón" (Entrégate, Tengo Todo Excepto a Ti, La Incondicional)	Juan Carlos Calderón	7:30
5.	"Up-tempo Medley" (Un Hombre Busca una Mujer, Cuestión de Piel, Oro de Ley)	Calderón; Luis Gómez-Escolar	5:30
6.	"Romance" (No Me Platiques Más, No Sé Tú, La Puerta, La Barca, Inolvidable)	Vicente Garrido; Armando Manzanero; Luis Demetrio; Roberto Cantoral; Julio Gutierrez	11:07
7.	"Suave"	Orlando Castro; Kiko Cibrian	5:31
8.	"Segundo Romance" (El Día Que Me Quieras, Solamente una Vez, Somos Novios, Todo y Nada, Nosotros)	Alfredo Le Pera; Carlos Gardel; Agustín Lara; Manzanero; Garrido; Pedro Junco	11:54
9.	"O Tú o Ninguna"	Calderón	3:12
10.	"Sol, Arena y Mar"	Miguel; F. Loyo; Salo Loyo; Pérez	3:14
11.	"Romances" (Voy a Apagar La Luz / Contigo Aprendí, Por Debajo de la Mesa, El Reloj, Sabor a Mí, La Gloria Eres Tú, Bésame Mucho)	Manzanero; Cantoral; Álvaro Carrillo; José Antonio Méndez; Consuelo Velázquez	15:38
12.	"Y"	Mario De Jesús Báez	2:40
13.	"La Bikina"	Rubén Fuentes	2:55
14.	"Cómo Es Posible Que a Mi Lado"	Miguel; Asensi; Cibrian	3:53
15.	"Será Que No Me Amas"	Mick Jackson; Dave Jackson; Elmar Krohn; Calderón	5:50
16.	"Te Propongo Esta Noche"	Miguel; Calderón; Pérez	5:01

Audio version
No.	Title	Writer(s)	Length
1.	"Intro"		1:41
2.	"Quiero"	Miguel; Kortbawi; F. Loyo; Asensi	4:05
3.	"Tú, Sólo Tú"	Miguel; Pérez	3:38
4.	"Romance" (No Me Platiques Más, No Sé Tú, La Puerta, La Barca, Inolvidable)	Garrido; Manzanero; Demetrio; Cantoral; Gutierrez	11:12
5.	"Suave"	Castro; Cibrian	5:35
6.	"Segundo Romance" (El Día Que Me Quieras, Solamente una Vez, Somos Novios, Todo y Nada, Nosotros)	Le Pera; Gardel; Lara; Manzanero; Garrido; Junco	10:53
7.	"O Tú o Ninguna"	Calderón	3:17
8.	"Sol, Arena y Mar"	Miguel; F. Loyo; S. Loyo; Pérez	3:14
9.	"Romances" (Voy a Apagar La Luz / Contigo Aprendí, Por Debajo de la Mesa, El Reloj, Sabor a Mí, La Gloria Eres Tú, Bésame Mucho)	Manzanero; Cantoral; Carrillo; Méndez; Velázquez	14:46
10.	"Y"	De Jesús Báez	2:42
11.	"La Bikina"	Fuentes	2:59
12.	"Cómo Es Posible Que a Mi Lado"	Miguel; Asensi; Cibrian	3:58
13.	"Te Propongo Esta Noche"	Miguel; Calderón; Pérez	5:21
Total length:			73:21

== Charts ==
=== Weekly charts ===
Weekly chart performance for Vivo
Chart (2000)	Peak position
Argentine Albums (CAPIF)	1
Colombian Albums (ASINCOL)	3
European Albums (Music & Media)	52
Mexican Albums (AMPROFON)	1
Spanish Albums (PROMUSICAE)	2
US Billboard 200	93
US Top Latin Albums (Billboard)	2
US Latin Pop Albums (Billboard)	2

Chart (2018)	Peak position
Mexican Albums (AMPROFON)	13

=== Year-end charts ===
Year-end chart performance for Vivo
Chart (2000)	Position
Spanish Albums (PROMUSICAE)	22

Chart (2001)	Position
US Top Latin Albums (Billboard)	9
US Latin Pop Albums (Billboard)	7

Chart (2018)	Position
Mexican Albums (AMPROFON)	88

=== Decade-end charts ===
Decade-end chart performance for Vivo
Chart (2000–2009)	Position
US Top Latin Albums (Billboard)	83

== Certifications ==
=== Album ===
Region	Certification	Certified units/sales
Argentina (CAPIF)	2× Platinum	120,000^{^}
Chile	Platinum	25,000
Colombia	—	70,000
Mexico (AMPROFON)	3× Platinum+Gold	525,000^{^}
Spain (Promusicae)	3× Platinum	300,000^{^}
United States (RIAA)	2× Platinum (Latin)	200,000^{^}
Summaries
Worldwide	—	2,000,000
^{^} Shipments figures based on certification alone.

=== Video ===
Region	Certification	Certified units/sales
Argentina (CAPIF)	Platinum	8,000^{^}
Brazil (Pro-Música Brasil)	Gold	25,000^{*}
Mexico (AMPROFON)	2× Platinum	40,000^{^}
Spain (Promusicae)	Gold	10,000^{^}
^{*} Sales figures based on certification alone.^{^} Shipments figures based on certification alone.

== See also ==
- 2000 in Latin music
- List of best-selling Latin albums
