= Estadio de Fútbol de la Universidad Simón Bolívar =

Sports venue in Caracas, Venezuela

Coordinates: 10.4125°N 66.8886°W

- Estadio de Fútbol de la USB
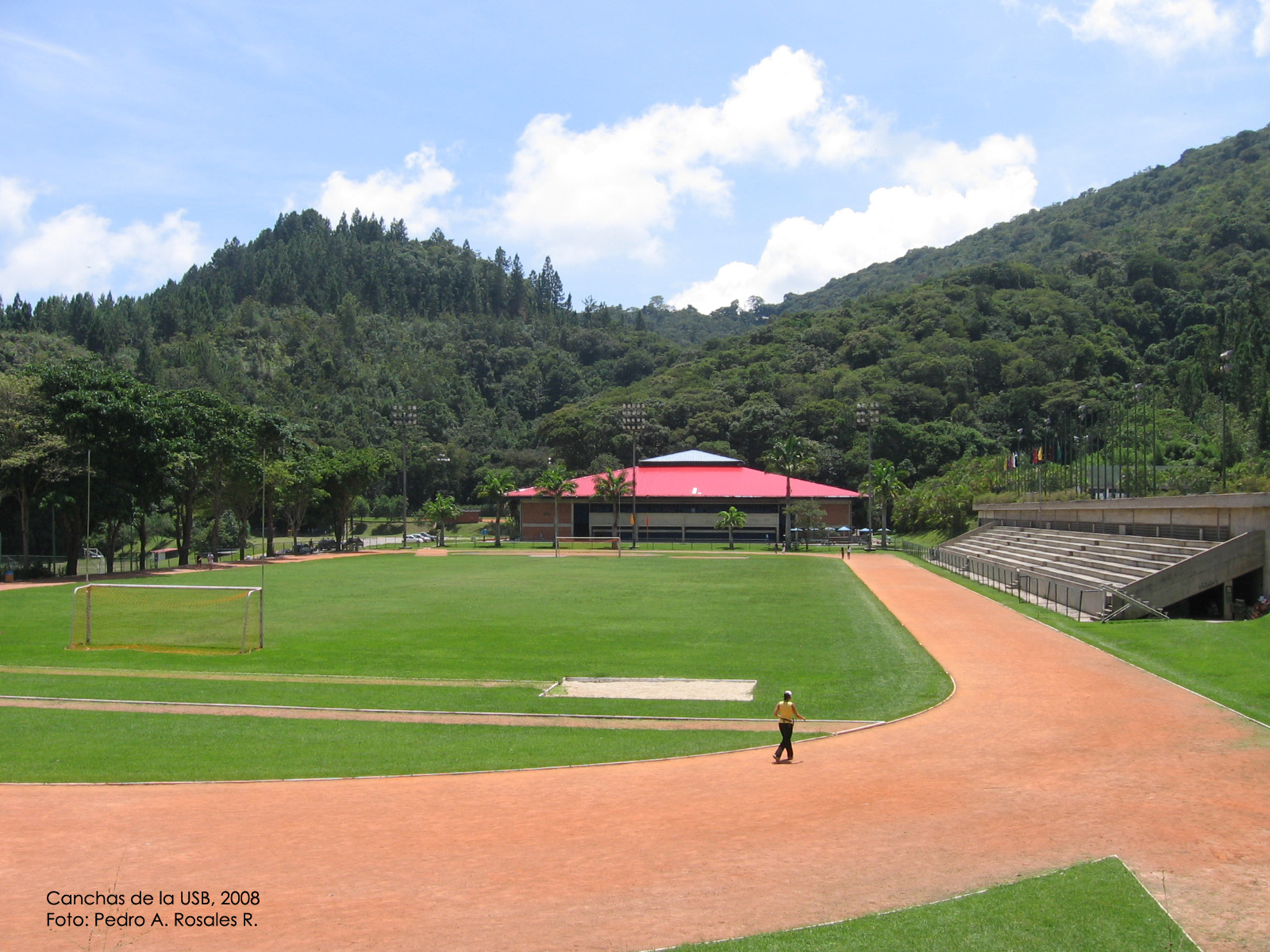
- Interactive map of Estadio de Fútbol de la Universidad Simón Bolívar
- Address: Calle Interna Canchas; Caracas 1080; Venezuela
- Location: Simón Bolívar University, Sartenejas, Baruta, Miranda
- Owner: Universidad Simón Bolívar
- Operator: Evenpro
- Capacity: 15,000 (Standing room only)

Construction
- Opened: 1970
- Renovated: 2011

Estadio de Fútbol Universidad Simón Bolívar (English: football Stadium at the Simón Bolívar University) (also known as the Campo de fútbol de la Universidad Simón Bolívar and Campo Olímpico), is a football field located on the campus of the Universidad Simón Bolívar, in Caracas, Venezuela. The stadium is primarily used as a concert venue, operated by Evenpro, bringing many international acts to Caracas. Within the university, it is used as a practice field for many athletic events.

== Events ==
The stadium is used to perform cultural shows as well as sporting events, with big concerts from various national and international artists taking place there occasionally. Since the stadium is a public sports infrastructure that the university manages independently, permission from the university authorities is required for its use by entertainers. Some of the concerts presented at the stadium include:

Date	Country of Artist(s)	Artist	Tour
15 November 2008	England, United States	Duran Duran, Maroon 5	Caracas Pop Festival 2008
16 November 2008	England, United States	R.E.M., Travis (band)	Caracas Pop Festival 2008
28 April 2009	England	Oasis	Dig Out Your Soul Tour
17 September 2009	Spain	Plácido Domingo	Amore Infinito Tour
15 May 2010	Argentina	Gustavo Cerati	Fuerza Natural Tour
16 May 2010	Italy	Eros Ramazzotti	Alas y Raíces Tour
8 October 2010	United States, Venezuela	Green Day & Lado B	21st Century Breakdown World Tour
17 November 2010	France	David Guetta	Fuck Me I’m Famous! World Tour
27 March 2011	Colombia	Shakira	The Sun Comes Out World Tour
17 May 2011	United States	Miley Cyrus	Gypsy Heart Tour
9 July 2011	Venezuela, Puerto Rico	Los Amigos Invisibles, Chino y Nacho, Carlos Baute, Gilberto Santa Rosa	Nivea Festival
1 October 2011	Puerto Rico	Ricky Martin	Música + Alma + Sexo World Tour
19 October 2011	Canada	Justin Bieber	My World Tour
4 November 2011	Venezuela	Franco De Vita	Tour Mira Más Allá
28 November 2011	United States	Britney Spears	Femme Fatale Tour
5 February 2012	England	Elton John	Greatest Hits Tour
11 March 2012	Mexico	Maná	Drama y Luz World Tour
17 March 2012	Mexico	Luis Miguel	Luis Miguel Tour
16 June 2012	United States	Jennifer Lopez	Dance Again World Tour
12 September 2012	Mexico	Vicente Fernández	Tour La Despedida
12 January 2013	France	David Guetta	Nothing but the Beat Tour
23 February 2013	England	Jamiroquai	Rock Dust Light Star Tour
24 February 2013	United States	Jonas Brothers	Jonas Brothers World Tour 2012/2013
20 September 2013	United States	Beyoncé	The Mrs. Carter Show World Tour
12 October 2013	Italy	Il Volo	2013 World Tour
9 November 2013	Mexico	Luis Miguel	The Hits Tour
1 July 2023	Venezuela	Lasso	Lasso vs. Quedarse Solo en Casa World Tour
