= List of number-one albums of 1999 (Spain) =

The List of number-one albums of 1999 in Spain is derived from the Top 100 España record chart published weekly by PROMUSICAE (Productores de Música de España), a non-profit organization composed by Spain and multinational record companies. This association tracks record sales (physical and digital) in Spain.

== Albums ==
Week	Chart Date	Album	Artist	Reference
1	January 4	Más	Alejandro Sanz	
2	January 11	Más	Alejandro Sanz	
3	January 18	Más	Alejandro Sanz	
4	January 25	Más	Alejandro Sanz	
5	February 1	Más	Alejandro Sanz	
6	February 8	Dile al sol	La Oreja de Van gogh	
7	February 15	Dile al sol	La Oreja de Van gogh	
8	February 22	Dile al sol	La Oreja de Van gogh	
9	March 1	Dile al sol	La Oreja de Van gogh	
10	March 8	Tierra de Nadie	Hevia	
11	March 15	Tierra de Nadie	Hevia	
12	March 22	Tierra de Nadie	Hevia	
13	March 29	Tierra de Nadie	Hevia	
14	April 5	Tierra de Nadie	Hevia	
15	April 12	Atado a Tu Amor	Chayanne	
16	April 19	Bury The Hatchet	The Cranberries	
17	April 26	Atado a Tu Amor	Chayanne	
18	May 3	Atado a Tu Amor	Chayanne	
19	May 10	Ricky Martin	Ricky Martin	
20	May 17	Millennium	Backstreet Boys	
21	May 24	Millennium	Backstreet Boys	
22	May 31	Millennium	Backstreet Boys	
23	June 7	Millennium	Backstreet Boys	
24	June 14	Millennium	Backstreet Boys	
25	June 21	Millennium	Backstreet Boys	
26	June 28	Songs from Ally McBeal	Vonda Shepard	
27	July 5	Songs from Ally McBeal	Vonda Shepard	
28	July 12	Songs from Ally McBeal	Vonda Shepard	
29	July 19	Songs from Ally McBeal	Vonda Shepard	
30	July 26	Songs from Ally McBeal	Vonda Shepard	
31	August 2	Gold: Greatest Hits	ABBA	
32	August 9	Gold: Greatest Hits	ABBA	
33	August 16	Gold: Greatest Hits	ABBA	
34	August 23	Gold: Greatest Hits	ABBA	
35	August 30	Versión Original	Presuntos Implicados	
36	September 6	19 días y 500 noches	Joaquín Sabina	
37	September 13	Amarte Es un Placer	Luis Miguel	
38	September 20	Amarte Es un Placer	Luis Miguel	
39	September 27	Amarte Es un Placer	Luis Miguel	
40	October 4	Lo Mejor de Bosé	Miguel Bosé	
41	October 11	Amarte Es un Placer	Luis Miguel	
42	October 18	19 días y 500 noches	Joaquín Sabina	
43	October 25	19 días y 500 noches	Joaquín Sabina	
44	November 1	A Mis Niños de 30 Años	Miliki	
45	November 8	A Mis Niños de 30 Años	Miliki	
46	November 15	A Mis Niños de 30 Años	Miliki	
47	November 22	Enrique	Enrique Iglesias	
48	November 29	A Mis Niños de 30 Años	Miliki	
49	December 6	A Mis Niños de 30 Años	Miliki	
50	December 13	A Mis Niños de 30 Años	Miliki	
51	December 20	A Mis Niños de 30 Años	Miliki	
52	December 27	A Mis Niños de 30 Años	Miliki	

== See also ==
- List of number-one singles of 1999 (Spain)
