= Amarte Es un Placer (album) =

Studio album by Luis Miguel
- Released: 13 September 1999
- Studios: A&M Studios; Cello Studios; Ocean Way Recording; Watersound; Record Plant; (Hollywood, California)
- Genre: Pop
- Length: 49:40
- Language: Spanish
- Label: WEA Latina
- Producer: Luis Miguel

Luis Miguel chronology
Romances (1997)	Amarte Es un Placer (1999)	Vivo (2000)

Singles from Amarte Es un Placer
- 1. "Sol, Arena y Mar" Released: 19 July 1999; 2. "O Tú o Ninguna" Released: 6 September 1999; 3. "Dormir Contigo" Released: January 2000; 4. "Amarte Es un Placer" Released: 2000

Amarte Es un Placer (transl. Loving You Is a Pleasure) is the thirteenth studio album by Mexican singer Luis Miguel. It was released by WEA Latina on 13 September 1999. Produced by Miguel, it is a pop album with R&B and jazz influences. Miguel was more involved with the songwriting on this record than on earlier albums and was assisted by composers including Arturo Pérez, Armando Manzanero, and Juan Carlos Calderón. Despite the popularity of his contemporaries Ricky Martin and Enrique Iglesias who crossed over to the English-language market, Miguel preferred to sing and record in Spanish at the time.

Four singles were released to promote the album: "Sol, Arena y Mar", "O Tú o Ninguna", "Dormir Contigo", and the title track "Amarte Es un Placer". Miguel embarked on a world tour which lasted from September 1999 into May 2000. He performed in Spain, South America, Mexico, and the United States. It became the highest-grossing tour by a Spanish-speaking recording artist.

Amarte Es un Placer debuted at number one in Spain and on the Billboard Top Latin Albums chart in the United States. It was certified gold in the United States and achieved multi-platinum status in Argentina, Chile, Mexico, and Spain. The album has sold 3.5 million copies worldwide. On its release, the record received mixed reviews from music critics; several praised the production as well as Miguel's vocals and the compositions, but others felt it did not differ from his earlier recordings and found the music outdated. Miguel received several accolades, including the Latin Grammy Awards for Album of the Year and Best Pop Vocal Album and a Grammy nomination for Best Latin Pop Performance.

== Background ==
In 1997, Luis Miguel released his twelfth studio album Romances. It is the third record in his Romance series where he performed covers of classic Latin American boleros. It sold more than 4.5 million copies and won the Grammy Award for Best Latin Pop Performance in 1998. To promote Romances, he embarked on a tour of the United States, Latin America, and Spain which lasted more than a year. By 1998, Miguel was among the most successful Latin artists internationally with album sales of more than 35 million copies worldwide. In October 1998, Mexican composer Armando Manzanero, who worked with Miguel on the Romance albums, confirmed to a reporter from Notimex that he was assisting Miguel with a new project. After a two-year absence from the music scene, Miguel announced on 19 July 1999 that he would release a new album by September. He indicated the forthcoming album would be a return to pop recordings as opposed to the bolero cover versions he had recorded on the Romance series. The album's title, Amarte Es un Placer (transl. Loving You Is a Pleasure), was announced on 17 August 1999.

Miguel held a press conference at the Casino de Madrid in Madrid, Spain, on the album's launch date of 13 September 1999. He confirmed it was the first album where he was more involved in the tracks' composition: "Here something special was done, probably because I had more time to write a few things," he added. When asked why he opted to not record an English-language album, like other Latin acts such as Enrique Iglesias and Ricky Martin had successfully done, Miguel replied: "I think that Spanish is a good language. I like my language and I really feel proud of it. I'm not saying that I won't do it in the future, sing in English, I mean. But it's just that it's not the right time for me. Why should I do it, just because everybody else is doing it?" He was also asked about the lack of a duet with his then-girlfriend, American singer Mariah Carey, to which he responded he does not like to mix his personal life with his career. He added that the music he performs is based on his feelings at the time, and hinted that the album's title was influenced by his relationship with Carey.

As well as co-writing several of the record's tracks, Miguel was assisted by other composers including Manzanero, Juan Carlos Calderón, and Arturo Pérez. Recording took place at the A&M Studios, Cello Studios, Ocean Way Recording, Watersound, and the Record Plant in Hollywood, California; Miguel handled the productions himself.

== Composition ==
Luis Miguel "Tu Mirada"
A 24 second sample of the album's opening track "Tu Mirada". The Newsday editor Richard Torres described it as a demi-rock ballad and felt that Miguel's vocals gives the song a "a sense of urgency".

Luis Miguel "Te Propongo Esta Noche"
A 30 second sample of Miguel's "Te Propongo Esta Noche", an uptempo song recorded for the album. Ramiro Burr of the San Antonio Express-News writes that it "brims with marvelous horns and sweeping vocal harmonies".

Amarte Es un Placer is a pop album composed of twelve love songs. It consists mainly of orchestrated romantic ballads and several uptempo numbers. Unlike his earlier pop record Nada Es Igual... (1996), which featured dance music and hip-hop influences, Amarte Es un Placer's emphasis is on adult contemporary music. The opening track, "Tu Mirada" is a rock ballad with a guitar solo. Manzanero composed three ballads for the album: "Soy Yo", "Dormir Contigo", and "Ese Momento". The latter deals with a "narrative account of the instance when two bodies merge in fiery passion". On "Dormir Contigo", the protagonist talks about the joy of sleeping with his love interest. "Sol, Arena y Mar" is a horn-driven uptempo track with jazz influences, which describes the "pain of separation" of a love that "disappeared as quickly as the foam at the seashore".

"Quiero" is an R&B "groove" track which incorporates strings on its crescendo, a saxophone solo, and brass instruments. "Tú, Sólo Tú" is a disco-influenced, mid-tempo "groove" song. "Dímelo en un Beso" is a pop ballad which also incorporates disco music. "O Tú o Ninguna" is a bolero composed by Calderón, while "No Me Fío" is reminiscent of a 1980s power ballad. "Te Propongo Esta Noche", the album's only dance number, begins as a "smooth" R&B track until it changes to percussion-driven club music halfway through the song. The album closes with the title track which features "dramatic orchestral sweeps" throughout the tune. The song caused controversy when Mexican composer Marcos Lifshitz accused Calderón and Miguel of plagiarizing his composition "Siento nuestro aliento" which he wrote in 1997. A court ruled in favor of Lifshitz and ordered Miguel and his record label to pay 40 percent of the song's royalties as compensation.

== Singles ==
"Sol, Arena y Mar" was released as the first single from Amarte Es un Placer on 19 July 1999. It peaked at number three on the Billboard Hot Latin Songs chart in the United States and topped the ballads chart in Mexico. A remix of the song by American DJ Danny Saber was released as a single; it peaked at number two in Spain. "O Tú o Ninguna" was released as the album's second single on 6 September 1999. It reached the top of the Hot Latin Songs chart in the US for one week. Rebecca Blake filmed the music video for the track in San Francisco. In Ibero America, it peaked at number five in Guatemala, number two on the Mexican ballad charts, number three in Nicaragua, number four in Nicaragua, and ten in Uruguay.

The third single, "Dormir Contigo", was released in January 2000 and peaked at number 11 on the Hot Latin Songs chart and number six on the Mexican ballads chart. In the same month, the music video for the fourth single, "Amarte Es un Placer", was directed by Alberto Tolot and filmed in Bel-Air, California. The title track peaked at number six on the Hot Latin Songs chart, seven on the ballads chart in Mexico, number two in Chile and three in Honduras. In addition to the singles, "Soy Yo" topped the record charts in Honduras and Panama, while "Tú, Sólo Tú" reached number ten on the ballads chart in Mexico.

== Promotion ==
To promote the album, Luis Miguel began his Amarte Es Un Placer Tour on 9 September 1999 in Gijón, Spain. In Madrid, he performed three sold-out shows, and spent a month touring Spain. His performances in Barcelona, Marbella, and Tenerife were among the country's highest grossing shows of 1999. Miguel then toured South America where he performed in Argentina, Brazil, Chile, Uruguay, and Venezuela. In Argentina, he drew more than 50,000 attendees to his concerts. His eight shows in Chile attracted more than 101,800 spectators, the largest audiences of the year for an artist there. The first leg of the tour ended on 11 December 1999 in Maracaibo, Venezuela. A concert was planned for the San Jose Arena in California on New Year's Eve but was canceled because the gross income would not meet Miguel's requirements.

Miguel began the second leg of his tour at the Centennial Garden in Bakersfield, California, on 1 February 2000. Two days later, he performed at the Universal Amphitheatre in Los Angeles, California, for five consecutive nights drawing more than 24,000 spectators. In the same month, he performed four shows at Radio City Music Hall in New York City and grossed $1.4 million. He also appeared in Minneapolis on 12 February and in Fairfax on 14 February. Following his concerts at Radio City Music Hall, Miguel performed 21 consecutive shows at the National Auditorium in Mexico City beginning on 24 February. Beating the previous record of 20 set by Mexican group Timbiriche, Miguel also set the record for most attendees with an overall count of 255,000 patrons.

Miguel returned to tour in the United States on 24 March 2000, performing in several cities including Miami, Chicago, Atlantic City, and Houston. He later presented five shows in Monterrey, Mexico, from 13 to 17 April 2000. After a few more performances in the US, he ended the tour in San Diego, California on 6 May 2000. Miguel had the 23rd highest-grossing tour in the US that year, earning more than $15.7 million from his 44 shows in the country. The tour was recognized by the William Morris Agency as the highest-grossing tour by a Spanish-speaking artist.

Miguel was accompanied by a 13-piece band during his tour which included horns, keyboards, guitars, and three female backup singers. His hour-and-a-half show consisted mainly of pop songs and ballads from Amarte Es un Placer and his earlier career, as well as medleys of boleros from the Romance-themed albums. During his concerts in Monterrey, he was joined by Cutbert Pérez's band Mariachi 2000 and performed live covers of Mario De Jesús Báez's "Y" and Rubén Fuentes "La Bikina". The shows included a large live-screen behind the stage and featured fireworks and confetti.

Of Miguel's performances in Los Angeles, The Orange County Register editor Daniel Chang commented that he "delivered a classy show that was as much fun to watch as it was to hear". He noted that Miguel "emotes a contagious energy through dramatic facial expressions, fetal-position-like contortions and physical outbursts in time with the music," and complimented his dance moves and the visual sets. Of his concert in Houston, Michael D. Clark of the Houston Chronicle wrote that Miguel "proved, once again, that it isn't necessary to change languages to reach U.S. audiences". He observed that Miguel seemed "determined to balance the upbeat with the overwrought" in contrast with his previous concerts, which were dominated by ballads. Clark was disappointed that the boleros were sung in medleys which did not allow any of them to stand out.

Jon Bream commented in the Star Tribune that Miguel's presentation in Minneapolis was "one of the most ambitious concert spectacles ever presented at the theater" and that the singer had a "captivating presence," but added his music was "not particularly distinctive". He likened Miguel's uptempo songs to Earth, Wind & Fire albeit without the "rhythmic and jazzy sophistication," considered his ballads to be "conservative pop, bathed in synthesized strings with Chicago-like horn filigree," and felt let down by Miguel's choice to perform his boleros in medleys.

On 24 October 2000, WEA released the Vivo live album and video from Miguel's concerts in Monterrey. AllMusic editor Perry Seibert gave the video album two-out-of-five stars. He criticized its lack of subtitles, closed captions, and supplemental materials, but stated it should not "dissuade fans of Latino music from checking out this entertaining DVD from Warner Bros."

== Critical reception ==
Professional ratings
Review scores
Source	Rating
AllMusic	2.5/5 stars
Houston Chronicle	2.5/4 stars
Los Angeles Daily News	3/4 stars
Los Angeles Times	2.5/4 stars
Orange County Register	3.5/5 stars
The San Diego Union-Tribune	3/4 stars

AllMusic editor Jose F. Promis gave it two-and-a-half out of five stars, noting that from the title "one can deduce that the material consists of romantic music, mostly in the form of ballads". He felt that the horn sections on "Sol, Arena y Mar" and "Quiero" gave the songs a "jazzy, sophisticated, adult-leaning feel" and called "Te Propongo Esta Noche" "one of the album's most interesting songs". He criticized the inclusion of "overblown ballads", citing "No Me Fío" as an example. Promis called the production "flawless" and concluded that ballads are "what the fans have come to expect" from Miguel. John Lannert of Billboard magazine was unimpressed with the record; he panned "Sol, Arena y Mar" as a "vapid, uptempo dance number". While Lannert regarded "Soy Yo" and "Dormir Contigo" as a "pair of moving romantic ballads" that could help the disc stay on top of the Billboard Latin charts, he opined it was time for Miguel to record an English-language disc and have Carey and her producers assist with such an album. Roger Catlin of the Hartford Courant said that when the ballads "pile on", the album felt like "Telemundo soap-opera overkill". Nonetheless, he praised Miguel's "timing" on the uptempo songs and said his vocals make the dance tunes more "exciting".

The Houston Chronicle's Joey Guerra gave the album two-and-a-half stars out of four, saying that he was underwhelmed with the production for sounding too similar to Miguel's previous recordings. He recognized Miguel was capable of handling love songs because of his "rich, deep voice" on songs like "Tu Mirada", "Soy Yo", and "O Tú o Ninguna", but felt he "runs into trouble" on the dance tracks as he did on his prior albums. He chided "Sol, Arena y Mar" for its "tepid mix of blaring horns and uninspired lyrics" and said the other uptempo songs "don't fare any better"; he criticized the over usage of horns on every fast-paced track as "dated" and "repetitive". Mario Tarradell of The Dallas Morning News wrote a more positive review of the album, complimenting "Te Propongo Esta Noche" and lauding ballads like "Dormir Contigo" and "Ese Momento" as "sensual and solemn". Tarradell ended his review by describing Amartes Es un Placer an "enjoyable balance between high-brow ballads and hardwood workouts". Miami Herald editor Leila Cobo was disappointed with the record. She wrote that while Miguel's vocals are still "dazzling", the production sounded "dated". She found "Tú, Sólo Tú" and "Dímelo en un Beso" to be "discoish duds that lack the oomph to get you on the dance floor". Cobo also commented the tracks suffered from a lack of "strong hooks or melodies" despite Miguel having the ability to "elevate pretty much any style". Even so, Cobo praised "Dormir Contigo" for its "few memorable lyrics" and "No Me Fío" for its arrangements.

Fred Shuster of the Los Angeles Daily News rated the record three out of four stars and complimented the arrangements which he found to be "gorgeous". He felt the best tracks were the ones that Miguel co-wrote and highlighted "Sol Arena y Mar" and "O Tú o Ninguna" as standouts. The Los Angeles Times critic Ernesto Lechner gave the album two-and-a-half out of four stars, lamenting it "continues Latin pop's disheartening search for the glossiest production imaginable". He found the ballads to be "drenched in orchestral accompaniment," although he commended Manzanero's compositions. Regardless, Lechner opined the uptempo tracks "lack the sophistication that defines most pop today". Richard Torres, who wrote a more favorable review of the album for Newsday, said that Amarte Es un Placer continues Miguel's talent of infusing "lushly orchestrated torch songs with genuine passion". He praised his vocals for conveying the "giddy rush of romance followed by the ache of love lost". He also admired the dance tunes for their musical styles and proclaimed the songs penned by Manaznero the best tracks.

Daniel Chang of the Orange County Register rated the album three-and-a-half out of five stars and touted the delivery of Miguel's voice as well as the songs which help him convey his message. Chang noted that, "Even on weaker numbers, Miguel makes it work". The San Diego Union-Tribune's editor Ernesto Portillo, Jr. gave the disc three out of four stars. While he regarded "Sol, Arena y Mar" as a "jaunty pop tune that sounds vaguely like previous Miguel horn-driven numbers," he felt that Miguel excelled best on the ballads citing "Soy Yo" as an example. He called the record the best outside of the Romance series. Eliseo Cardona, writing for El Nuevo Herald, noted that even though Miguel's musical style does not evolve, he still retains the finesse required to produce an album, and remarked that the jazz elements and the symphony work well on the album.

== Accolades ==
At the 42nd Annual Grammy Awards in 2000, Amarte Es un Placer received a nomination for Best Latin Pop Performance, which went to Tiempos by Rubén Blades. At the inaugural Latin Grammy Awards in the same year, Miguel won the Latin Grammy Award for Album of the Year, Best Pop Vocal Album, and Best Male Pop Vocal Performance (for "Tu Mirada"). Miguel did not attend the award ceremony and declined an invitation to perform. At the 12th Annual Lo Nuestro Awards, it was nominated for Pop Album of the Year but lost to Supernatural by Santana.

The album won the award for Pop Album of the Year by a Male Artist at the 2000 Billboard Latin Music Awards. Miguel received two nominations at the 2000 El Premio de la Gente in the categories of Male Pop Artist or Group and Album of the Year; he lost both awards to MTV Unplugged by Maná. In Argentina, he was nominated for Best Male Latin Artist and Best Latin Album for Amarte Es un Placer at the 2000 Premios Gardel and awarded Best Latin Album at the 1999 Premios Amigo in Spain. The record was nominated in the category of Best Pop Album by a Male Artist at the 1999 Premios Globos which was awarded to Ricky Martin's self-titled album.

== Commercial performance ==
Amarte Es un Placer was released commercially on 13 September 1999. In the United States, the record debuted on top of the Billboard Top Latin Albums the week of 2 October 1999, succeeding Bailamos Greatest Hits by Enrique Iglesias. The disc spent nine weeks in this position and was later replaced by Desde un Principio: From the Beginning by Marc Anthony. It peaked at number 36 on the Billboard 200 chart, his highest debut position outside of the Romance albums, and sold more than 35,000 copies within its first week. It ended 1999 as the fifteenth bestselling Latin album in the US and was certified gold by the Recording Industry Association of America for shipping 500,000 copies.

In Spain, the disc debuted on top of the Spanish albums chart and was certified 7× platinum by the Productores de Música de España for shipping 700,000 copies. In Argentina, Amarte Es un Placer peaked at number six on the Argentina albums chart and was certified 5× platinum for shipping 300,000 copies. In Chile, it was certified quadruple platinum and was the second bestselling album of 1999 in the country. In Mexico, it was certified 5× platinum by the Asociación Mexicana de Productores de Fonogramas y Videogramas. Elsewhere in Latin America, the record received a platinum certification in Venezuela and gold certifications in Bolivia, Paraguay, and Uruguay. Amarte Es un Placer had sold 3.5 million copies worldwide.

== Track listing ==
All tracks produced by Luis Miguel.

No.	Title	Lyrics	Music	Length
1.	"Tu Mirada"	Alejandro Asensi	Luis Miguel; Francisco Loyo	4:09
2.	"Soy Yo"	Armando Manzanero	Manzanero	3:55
3.	"Sol, Arena y Mar"	Miguel; Arturo Pérez	F. Loyo; Salo Loyo	3:18
4.	"O Tú o Ninguna"	Juan Carlos Calderón	Calderón	3:16
5.	"Quiero"	Miguel; Roland Kortbawi; Asensi	F. Loyo	4:36
6.	"Dormir Contigo"	Manzanero	Manzanero	4:15
7.	"Dímelo en un Beso"	Miguel; S. Loyo	F. Loyo; Victor Loyo	4:36
8.	"No Me Fío"	Calderón	Calderón	3:45
9.	"Te Propongo Esta Noche"	Miguel; Calderón; Pérez; Asensi	Miguel; Calderón	6:11
10.	"Tú, Sólo Tú"	Miguel; Pérez	Miguel	4:19
11.	"Ese Momento"	Manzanero	Manzanero	3:49
12.	"Amarte Es un Placer"	Calderón	Calderón; Marcos Lifshitz	3:31

== Personnel ==
Adapted from the Amarte Es un Placer liner notes:

=== Performance credits ===
Brass

- Jerry Hey
- Gary Grant
- Dan Higgins
- Bill Reichenbach
- Chuck Findley

Chorus

- Carlos Murguia
- Natisse Jones
- Kenny O'Brien-Paez
- Giselda Vatcky
- Will Wheaton
- Terry Wood
- Maria del Rey

Concert masters

- Bruce Dukov
- Ralph Morrison

Drums

- Vinnie Colaiuta ("Quiero", "Tú, Sólo Tú", "No Me Fío")
- Victor Loyo ("Dímelo en un Beso", "Ese Momento", "Sol, Arena y Mar", "Te Propongo Esta Noche", "Tu Mirada", "Dormir Contigo", "O Tú o Ninguna", "Soy Yo")

Guitars

- Paul Jackson, Jr. ("Quiero", "Tú, Sólo Tú", "Dímelo en un Beso", "Sol Arena y Mar", "Te Propongo Esta Noche")
- Michael Landau ("Tu Mirada", "Dormir Contigo", No Me Fío", "O Tú o Ninguna")

Keyboards

- Robbie Buchanan ("Dormir Contigo", "Soy Yo", No Me Fío", "O Tú o Ninguna", "Amarte Es un Placer")
- Michel Colombier ("Ese Momento")
- Francisco Loyo ("Quiero", "Tú, Sólo Tú", "Dímelo en un Beso", "Sol, Arena y Mar", "Te Propongo Esta Noche", "Tu Mirada")

Orchestra director

- Pablo Aguirre ("No Me Fío", "O Tú o Ninguna")
- Michel Colombier ("Ese Momento", "Amarte Es un Placer")
- Larry Rench
- Bill Ross ("Dormir Contigo", "Soy Yo")

Percussion

- Tom Aros ("Tú, Sólo Tú", "Dímelo en un Beso", "Te Propongo Esta Noche")
- Luis Conte ("Quiero", "Sol Arena y Mar")

Viola

- Bob Becker
- Denyse Buffum
- Carole Castillo
- Brian Dembow
- Suzanna Giordano
- Mimi Granat
- John Hayhurst
- Carrie Holzman
- Vicky Miskolczy
- Jorge Moraga
- Janet Lakatos
- Carole Mukogawa
- Dan Neufeld
- Maria Newman
- Simon Oswell
- John Scanlon
- Harry Shirinian
- David Stenske
- Ron Strauss
- Mihail Zinovyev

Violin

- Richard Altenbach
- Jenny Bellusci
- Becky Bunnell
- Darius Campo
- Mario DeLeon
- Joel Deroiuin
- Bruce Dukov
- Dave Ewart
- Mike Ferrill
- Kirstin Fife
- Berj Garabedian
- Carmen Garabedian
- Pam Gates
- Julie Gigante
- Endre Granat
- Alan Grunfeld
- Clayton Haslop
- Gwenn Heller
- Lilly Ho Chen
- Pat Johnson
- Karen Jones
- Peter Kent
- Ezra Kliger
- Razdan Kuyumjian
- Natalie Leggett
- Brian Leonard
- Constance Meyer
- Horia Moroaica
- Sid Page
- Katia Popov
- Barbra Porter
- Debbie Price
- Rachel Purkin
- Kathleen Robertson
- Gil Romero
- Jay Rosen
- Marc Sazer
- Kwihee Shamban
- Daniel Shindaryov
- Leonardo Suarz-Paz
- Lesa Terry
- Olivia Tsui
- Mari Tsumura
- Margaret Wooten
- Ken Yereke
- Tiffany Yi Hu

Cello

- Bob Adcock
- Vage Ayrikyan
- Jodi Burnett
- Larry Corbett
- Steve Erdody
- Chris Ermacoff
- Stephanie Fife
- Dennis Karmazyn
- Suzie Katayama
- Armen Ksajikian
- Tim Landauer
- Dane Little
- Miguel Martinez
- Steve Richards
- Dan Smith
- Tina Soule

Bass

- Nico Abondola
- Ann Atkinson
- Drew Dembowski
- Chris Kollgaard
- Ed Meares
- Bruce Morgenthaler
- Paul Morin
- Dave Stone

Wind section

- Phil Ayling
- Emily Bernstein
- Gary Bovyer
- Tom Boyd
- Luise DiTullio
- Mike Grego
- Greg Huckins
- Jim Kanter
- Sheridon Stokes
- Dave Shostac
- Jim Walker

French horns

- Steve Becknell
- David Duke
- Steve Durnin
- Joe Meyer
- Brian O'Connor
- John Reynolds
- Kurt Snyder
- Jim Thatcher

Harp

- Gayle Levant
- Amy Wilkins

Additional musicians

- Alejandro Caballo – synth bass
- Lalo Carillo – bass
- Francisco Loyo – synthesizer, acoustic piano
- Jeff Nathanson – saxophone
- Dean Parks – acoustic guitar
- Peter Limonick – Timpani
- Chester Thompson – Hammond B3 Organ
- David Shamban – violoncello

=== Technical credits ===
- Luis Miguel – producer
- Alejandro Asensi – executive producer
- Armando Manzanero – music assistance
- Rafa Sardina – engineer and mixer
- John Sorenson – audio engineer and mixing ("Dímelo en un Beso", "Tú, Sólo Tú")
- Carlos Castro – additional recording
- Francisco Loyo – production assistant
- Al Schmitt – string recording engineer
- Shair Sutcliffe – production coordinator
- Alberto Tolot – photography
- Jeri and John Heiden – graphic design
- D. Ashton – assistant engineer, mixing assistant
- B. Cook – assistant engineer, mixing assistant
- G. Collins – assistant engineer, mixing assistant
- M. Huff – assistant engineer, mixing assistant
- B. Kinsley – assistant engineer, mixing assistant
- A. Olmsted – assistant engineer, mixing assistant
- C. Poledouris – assistant engineer, mixing assistant
- B. Smith – assistant engineer, mixing assistant
- Katie Teasdale – assistant engineer, mixing assistant
- Ron McMaster – mastering engineer

=== Recording and mixing locations ===
- A&M Studios, Hollywood, CA – recording
- Cello Studios, Hollywood, CA – recording
- Ocean Way Recording, Hollywood, CA – recording
- Watersound, Studio City, CA – recording
- Lion Recording, Hollywood, CA – recording
- Record Plant, Hollywood, CA – recording, mixing
- Pacifique Studios, North Hollywood, CA – mixing ("Sol, Arena y Mar")
- Capitol Mastering, Hollywood, CA - mastering

== Charts ==
=== Weekly charts ===
Chart (1999)	Peak position
Argentine Albums (CAPIF)	6
European Albums (Music & Media)	49
Spanish Albums (PROMUSICAE)	1
US Billboard 200	36
US Top Latin Albums (Billboard)	1
US Latin Pop Albums (Billboard)	1

=== Year-end charts ===
Chart (1999)	Position
Chilean Albums (IFPI)	2
Spanish Albums (PROMUSICAE)	3
US Top Latin Albums (Billboard)	15
US Latin Pop Albums (Billboard)	7

Chart (2000)	Position
Spanish Albums (PROMUSICAE)	44
US Top Latin Albums (Billboard)	14
US Latin Pop Albums (Billboard)	7

== Certifications and sales ==
Region	Certification	Certified units/sales
Argentina (CAPIF)	5× Platinum	300,000^{^}
Bolivia	Gold	
Chile	4× Platinum	100,000
Mexico (AMPROFON)	5× Platinum	800,000
Paraguay	Gold	
Spain (Promusicae)	7× Platinum	700,000^{^}
United States (RIAA)	Gold	500,000^{^}
Uruguay (CUD)	Gold	3,000^{^}
Venezuela	Platinum	40,000
Summaries
Worldwide	—	3,500,000
^{^} Shipments figures based on certification alone.

== See also ==
- 1999 in Latin music
- List of best-selling albums in Argentina
- List of best-selling albums in Chile
- List of best-selling albums in Mexico
- List of best-selling albums in Spain
- List of best-selling Latin albums
- List of number-one albums of 1999 (Spain)
- List of number-one Billboard Top Latin Albums from the 1990s
- List of number-one Billboard Latin Pop Albums from the 1990s
- List of number-one Billboard Latin Pop Albums from the 2000s
- List of number-one debuts on Billboard Top Latin Albums
