= Amarte Es un Placer (song) =

2000 song by Luis Miguel

Single by Luis Miguel

from the album Amarte Es un Placer
- Released: 2000
- Studio: A&M Studios; Cello Studios; Ocean Way Recording; Watersound; Record Plant (Hollywood, California)
- Length: 3:31
- Label: WEA Latina
- Songwriters: Juan Carlos Calderón; Marcos Lifshitz
- Producer: Luis Miguel

Luis Miguel singles chronology
"Dormir Contigo" (2000)	"Amarte Es un Placer" (2000)	"La Bikina" (2000)

Music video
- "Amarte Es un Placer" on YouTube

"Amarte Es un Placer" (English: "Loving You Is a Pleasure") is a song recorded by Mexican singer Luis Miguel and the fourth and final single from his album of the same name (1999). Released in 2000, it was written by Juan Carlos Calderón, while production was handled by Miguel. Lyrically, "Amarte Es un Placer" deals with a narrator describing the pleasures of being enamored with his lover.

The song received positive reactions from music critics for its orchestral arrangement and Miguel's delivery. However, both Miguel and Calderón were accused of plagiarism by Mexican composer Marcos Lifshitz who maintained that the melody in the song was derived from his composition "Siento nuestro aliento" and was not credited for it. A court ruled in favor of Lifshitz and ordered Miguel and Warner Music to pay 40% of the song's royalties as compensation. "Amarte Es un Placer" received a nomination for Pop Song of the Year at the 13th Annual Lo Nuestro Awards in 2001 and Calderón received an ASCAP Latin Award in the same year. A music video for the track was directed by Alberto Tolot and was nominated Best Clip of the Year in the Latin field at the 2000 Billboard Music Video Awards. The track peaked at number six Billboard Hot Latin Songs chart in the United States and number five on the Latin Pop Songs chart.

== Background and composition ==
After an absence of two years from the music scene, Miguel announced on 19 July 1999 that he would release an album by September, saying it would be a return to pop recordings as opposed to the bolero cover versions he had recorded on the Romance series. The record's final title, Amarte Es un Placer was announced on 17 August 1999.

Luis Miguel "Amarte Es un Placer"
A 21 second sample of Miguel's "Amarte Es un Placer", which was composed by Juan Carlos Calderón. The Houston Chronicle editor Ramiro Burr noted that the song balances its "dramatic orchestral sweeps and Luis Miguel's tough-guy-with-a-tender-touch stance."

"Amarte Es un Placer" was composed by Juan Carlos Calderón and produced by Miguel himself, with the lyrics with the lyrics describing the protagonist having the pleasure of being enamored with his love interest. It was released as the fourth single from Amarte Es un Placer in 2000, and was included on the setlist of his Cómplices Tour (2008).

== Reception and accolades ==
Eliseo Cardona from El Nuevo Herald regarded "Amarte Es un Placer" as the best track on the album. Ramiro Burr, writing for the Houston Chronicle praised the orchestra in the song and Miguel's delivery. "Amarte Es un Placer" was nominated in the category of Pop Song of the Year at the 13th Annual Lo Nuestro Awards in 2001, but lost to "A Puro Dolor" by Son by Four. The track was recognized as one of the major Latin songs of 2000 at the ASCAP Latin Awards in 2001.

In the United States, "Amarte Es un Placer" debuted at number 24 on the Billboard Hot Latin Songs chart on the week ending 25 March 2000, reaching its peak position at number 11 on 13 May 2000. The track also peaked at number five on the Latin Pop Songs chart.

== Controversy ==
In 2000, Mexican composer Marcos Lifshitz accused Miguel, Calderón, and Warner Music of plagiarizing his composition "Siento nuestro aliento" ("I Feel Our Breath"). Lifshitz maintained that he created the melody that was used on "Amarte Es un Placer" but was not credited for it. A court ruled in 2007 in favor of Lifshitz and ordered Miguel and his record label to pay 40% of the song's royalties as compensation.

== Music video ==
The music video for "Amarte Es un Placer" was filmed by Alberto Tolot at a mansion in January 2000 in Bel Air, California. In the video, Miguel enters the mansion and views a painting of Flaming June which comes to life. He serenades in the building and later finds the woman portrayed in the painting. The visual was nominated in the category of Best Clip of the Year in the Latin field at the 2000 Billboard Video Music Awards, but lost to "Ritmo Total" (1999) by Enrique Iglesias.

== Personnel ==
Credits adapted from the liner notes of Amarte Es un Placer.

- Luis Miguel – producer, vocals
- Juan Carlos Calderón – songwriter, arranger
- Michael Colombier – orchestra arranger

== Charts ==
=== Weekly charts ===
Chart (2000)	Peak position
Chile (EFE)	2
Honduras (EFE)	3
US Hot Latin Songs (Billboard)	6
US Latin Pop Airplay (Billboard)	5

=== Year-end charts ===
Chart (2000)	Position
US Hot Latin Songs (Billboard)	24
