= O Tú o Ninguna =

1999 song by Luis Miguel

Single by Luis Miguel

from the album Amarte Es un Placer
- Released: 6 September 1999
- Studio: A&M Studios; Cello Studios; Ocean Way Recording; Watersound; Record Plant (Hollywood, California)
- Genre: Bolero
- Length: 3:16
- Label: WEA Latina
- Songwriter: Juan Carlos Calderón
- Producer: Luis Miguel

Luis Miguel singles chronology
"Sol, Arena y Mar" (1999)	"O Tú o Ninguna" (1999)	"Dormir Contigo" (2000)

Music video
- "O Tú o Ninguna" on YouTube

"O Tú o Ninguna" (English: "Or You or Nobody") is a song written by Juan Carlos Calderón and produced and performed by Mexican singer Luis Miguel. The song is a bolero in which the protagonist cannot envision his life without anyone else besides his love interest. It was released as the second single from the album Amarte Es un Placer on 6 September 1999. The track topped the US Billboard Hot Latin Songs chart; and reached the top-five in Guatemala, Nicaragua and Panama.

"O Tú o Ninguna" received positive reviews from music critics who praised Miguel's delivery. It received a Latin Grammy nomination for Song of the Year in 2000. Calderón received an ASCAP Latin Award for the song in the same year. A music video for the track was filmed in San Francisco, California and directed by Rebecca Blake. In the video, Miguel searches for his love interest amidst a large crowd in the city.

== Background and composition ==
In 1997, Luis Miguel released his twelfth studio album Romances, the third record in his Romance series on which he covers classic Latin American boleros. It sold over 4.5 million copies and won the Grammy Award for Best Latin Pop Performance in 1998. To promote Romances, he embarked on a tour of the United States, Latin America, and Spain lasting over a year. By 1998, Miguel was considered the most popular Latin artist internationally and his albums had sold over 35 million copies worldwide. Miguel began a relationship with American singer Mariah Carey the following year. After an absence of two years on the music scene, Miguel announced on 19 July 1999 that he would release a new album by September. He said the upcoming album would be a return to pop recordings as opposed to the bolero cover versions he had recorded on the Romance series. He denied rumors that he was planning to record a duet with Carey. The album's final title, Amarte Es un Placer was announced on 17 August 1999.

Miguel confirmed that it was the first album where he was more involved in the tracks' composition. In addition to Miguel co-writing several of the record's tracks, he was assisted by other composers including Armando Manzanero, Juan Carlos Calderón, and Arturo Perez. Recording took place at the A&M Studios, Cello Studios, Ocean Way Recording, Watersound, and the Record Plant in Hollywood, California with Miguel handling the productions himself.

Luis Miguel "O Tú o Ninguna"
A 19 second sample of Miguel's "O Tú o Ninguna", which was composed by Juan Carlos Calderón. The Orange County Register editor Daniel Chang describes it as a "tender bolero that defines Miguel's signature style of heart-melting charm and warmth."

"O Tú o Ninguna" is a bolero composed by Calderón. In the lyrics, the protagonist cannot imagine being with anyone else besides his love interest. It was released as the second single from Amarte Es un Placer on 6 September 1999. A live version was included on the album Vivo (2000), and the original recording was included on the compilation album Grandes Éxitos (2005).

== Reception ==
Fred Shuster of the Los Angeles Daily News called "O Tú o Ninguna" a "radio staple". The Orange County Register editor Daniel Chang regarded the song as a "tender bolero that defines Miguel's signature style of heart-melting charm and warmth." The Houston Chronicle critic Joey Guerra regarded the track as an "effective love ballad". At the inaugural Latin Grammy Awards ceremony in 2000, "O Tú o Ninguna" received a nomination for Song of the Year, but lost to "Dímelo" by Marc Anthony. The track was recognized as one of the best performing Latin songs of 1999 at the ASCAP Latin awards in 2000.

In the United States, "O Tú o Ninguna" debuted at number 13 on the Billboard Hot Latin Songs chart on the week of 9 October 1999. It reached the top of the chart four weeks later replacing "Dímelo" by Marc Anthony. It was succeeded by Jaci Velasquez's song "Llegar a Ti" the following week. The track also reached the top of the Latin Pop Songs chart where it spent two weeks in this position.

== Music video ==
The music video for "O Tú o Ninguna" was filmed at San Francisco, California and directed by Rebecca Blake. Filming took place at the end of August 1999 and was released on 13 September 1999 to coincide with the launch of the album. In the video, Miguel reads a letter left behind by his love interest and goes on to search for her among the large crowd in the city.

== Charts ==
Chart (1999)	Peak position
Guatemala (Notimex)	5
Nicaragua (Notimex)	3
Panama (Notimex)	4
US Hot Latin Songs (Billboard)	1
US Latin Pop Airplay (Billboard)	1

== Personnel ==
Credits adapted from the Amarte Es un Placer liner notes.

- Luis Miguel – producer, vocals
- Juan Carlos Calderón – songwriter, arranger

== See also ==
- List of number-one Billboard Hot Latin Pop Airplay of 1999
- List of number-one Billboard Hot Latin Tracks of 1999
