= La Bikina =

Mexican song

Song by Ruben Fuentes
- Written: 1964
- Genre: Mariachi; ranchera

"La Bikina" is a Mexican song written by violinist and composer Rubén Fuentes in 1964. It is widely performed in the mariachi and ranchera genres. The inspiration behind the song and the identity of the woman it refers to remain disputed.

== Origin ==
"La Bikina" is a song written by Mexican classical violinist and composer Rubén Fuentes in 1964.

The origin of inspiration for "La Bikina" is disputed, and several accounts have been proposed. Fuentes did not confirm the song's origin. One explanation for the song's title claims that Fuentes, while walking on a beach with his son, overheard him remark that women wearing bikinis should be called "bikinas," which inspired him to write the song. Another account suggests that the title was influenced by an unnamed song from a U.S. television program. Other traditions trace the song's origins to the Cristero War in Mexico, an armed conflict between the Mexican government and Catholic rebels opposing the enforcement of anticlerical laws. In this version, the woman in the song was from Jalisco during the conflict and was named Carmen.

In February 2022, Mexican entertainment journalist Paty Chapoy interviewed a woman named Sanjuana Reyna, who claimed to be the woman referred to in the song. Reyna stated that she had worked as a singer in the 1980s and was known by the nickname "La Bikina." In 2026, Arturo Vargas of the mariachi group Vargas de Tecalitlán (which Fuentes played for until 1955, prior to the song's creation) said in a podcast that the song was also based on Reyna. Reyna claimed that she had been close to the group during her time as a singer.

== Cover versions ==
"La Bikina" is a widely played song in the mariachi and ranchera genre.

The song has been recorded by many artists, including: Lucha Villa, La Gran Orquesta de Paul Mauriat, Aberto Vazquez, Celia Cruz, Juan Torres, Chayito Valdez, Gaulberto Ibarreto, Yanni, Ray Conniff, Julio Iglesias (in French under the title "L'existence se danse"), Karol Sevilla (for the movie Coco), and many others. It was also the theme song of the animated Cantiflas Show throughout the 1970s and 1980s.

=== Luis Miguel version ===
"La Bikina"

Single by Luis Miguel

from the album Vivo
- Released: 15 September 2000
- Recorded: 14–15 April 2000
- Venue: Auditorio Coca-Cola (Monterrey, Nuevo León)
- Genre: Ranchera
- Length: 3:06
- Label: WEA Latina
- Songwriter: Rubén Fuentes
- Producer: Luis Miguel

Luis Miguel singles chronology
"Amarte Es un Placer" (2000)	"La Bikina" (2000)	"Y" (2000)

As part of the second leg of his tour, Miguel presented five shows at the Auditorio Coca-Cola in Monterrey, Mexico from 13 to 17 April 2000, During his concerts in Monterrey, he was joined by Cutberto Pérez's band Mariachi 2000 and performed live covers of "Y" and "La Bikina", which were made available as singles for Vivo. "La Bikina" was released as the lead single from the album on 15 September 2000, which an editor for La Opinión noted that the release day was likely meant to coincide with the Mexican Independence Day. Luis Miguel's version peaked at number two on the Billboard Hot Latin Songs in the United States. It recognized as one of the best performing Latin songs of the year at the BMI Latin Awards in 2002.
