= Auditorio Banamex =

Amphitheater in Mexico

Coordinates: 25.677677°N 100.280732°W

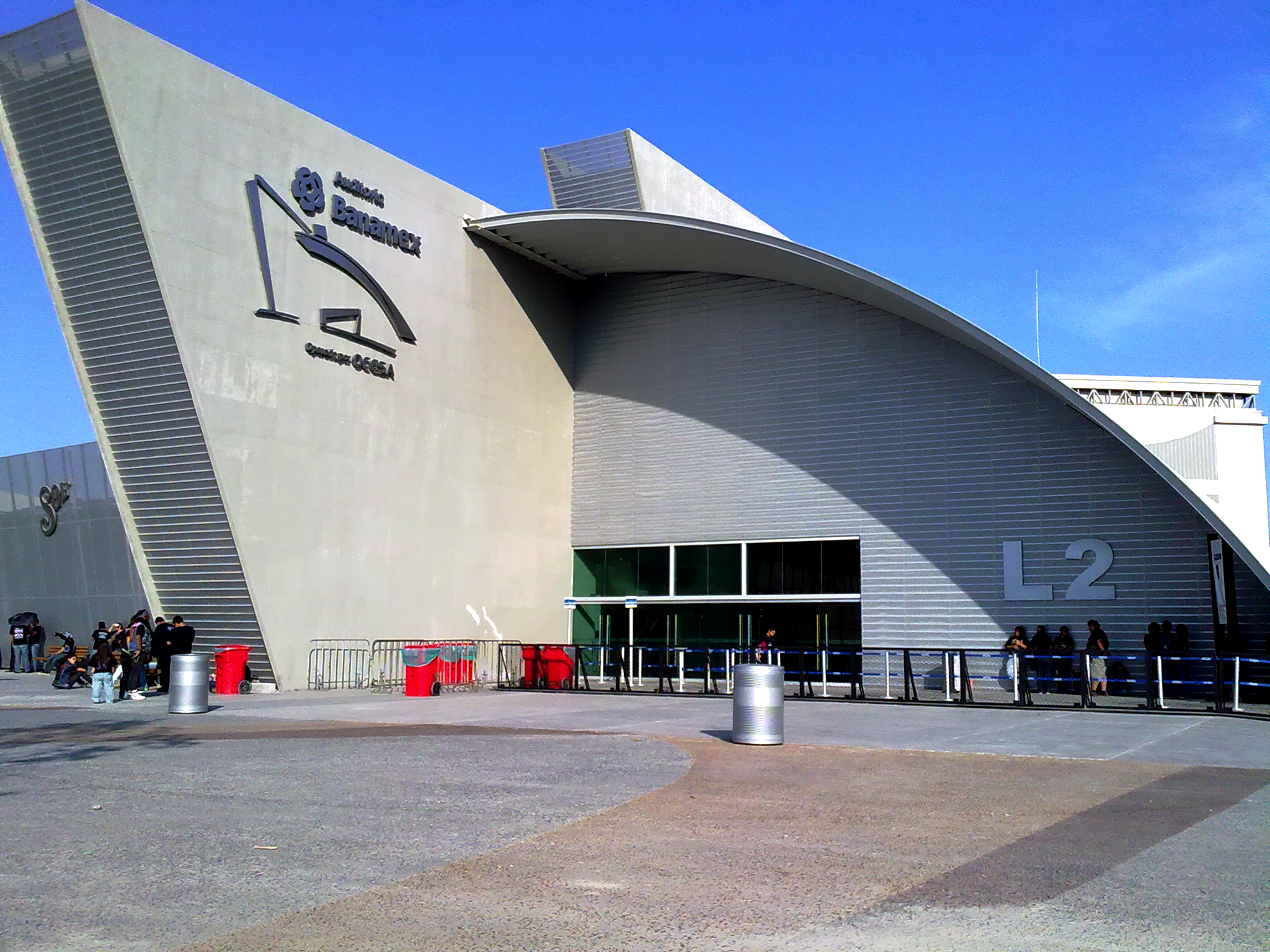
- Auditorio Banamex in 2012
- Interactive map of Auditorio Banamex
- Former names: Auditorio Fundidora (1994-95); Auditorio Coca-Cola (1995-2007); Auditorio Banamex (2010-16); Auditorio Citibanamex (2016-now)
- Address: Privada Fundidora S/N, Col. Obrera; 64010 Monterrey, NL; Mexico
- Location: Fundidora Park
- Owner: Ciudad de Monterrey
- Operator: OCESA
- Capacity: 8,200; 23,122 (original)

Construction
- Opened: 1994
- Renovated: 2010
- Closed: 2007-10
- Reopened: 22 September 2010

Website
- Venue Website

Auditorio Banamex (formerly named Auditorio Coca-Cola, Auditorio Fundidora and Auditorio Citibanamex) is an indoor amphitheatre, located in Fundidora Park, in Monterrey, Nuevo León. It was the primary venue for concerts until the Arena Monterrey opened in 2003. The amphitheatre opened in 1994 with a sponsorship by The Coca-Cola Company. When the venue was used less frequently, Mexican financial group Grupo Financiero Banamex, became its new sponsor with a $20 million investment. The venue closed for nearly two years to set forth renovations, which included updating the overall structure of the venue, converting it to an indoor amphitheatre. Additional upgrades included showrooms, a lounge along with other recreational areas.

The venue reopened in September 2010 with a three-month-long celebration, featuring concerts by: Vicente Fernández, Alejandra Guzmán, Chayanne, Marco Antonio Solís and Miguel Bosé. The amphitheatre is used for mid-sized concerts, attracting numerous international performers every year.

== See also ==
- List of contemporary amphitheaters
