= Leila Cobo =

Colombian journalist, writer, novelist, pianist and television show host

- Cobo in 2012
- Born: Cali, Colombia
- Education: Javeriana University; Manhattan School of Music; USC Annenberg School for Communication and Journalism
- Occupations: Journalist, writer, television host
- Awards: Fulbright Scholarship

Leila Cobo is a Colombian journalist, writer, novelist, pianist and television show host. She is noted for her coverage of Latin music for Billboard where she is currently the Co-Chief Content Officer for the entire brand. She was previously the Chief Content Officer for Latin Music and Español, overseeing the brand's coverage and development of Latin music across all its platforms. These include billboard.com and billboardespanol.com, which Cobo launched, podcasts and video. Cobo also programs the annual Billboard Latin Music Week, widely regarded as the premiere gathering for the Latin industry, where she has hosted such guests as Shakira, Romeo Santos, Peso Pluma and Carlos Santana.

Cobo was the first U.S.-based journalist and writer to prominently cover Latin music daily and has been instrumental in transforming its coverage and perception in the U.S.

A Fulbright Scholar with degrees in music and communications, Cobo is often sourced by outlets such as The New York Times, The Washington Post and The Guardian, and speaks frequently at conferences and universities around the world. She also an acclaimed author and novelist who has published five books, including two novels and most recently, a history of Latin music, entitled Decoding Despacito, which was selected as a New York Times Summer Read pick.

Prior to Billboard, she was the pop music critic for the Miami Herald and a reporter for the Los Angeles Times. Also known for her lifestyle writing, Cobo also served as director of content for Nexos, American Airlines' Spanish and Portuguese in-flight magazine. As an author, Cobo has published two novels (Tell Me Something True and The Second Time We Met, both on Grand Central Books/Hatchette). Her most recent book, Decoding Despacito: An Oral History of Latin Music (Penguin), published in English and Spanish, has been widely acclaimed as an essential guide to the history of Latin music. She also published a musical biography on the late Jenni Rivera, also in English and Spanish (La Increible Historia de Una Mariposa Guerrera (Penguin Books) and a book on the Latin music industry (Apunta a las estrellas) also with Penguin. She also collaborated with Puerto Rican star Ednita Nazario in her memoir Una Vida, which was published in 2017 by Penguin.

On television, Cobo was the host of Estudio Billboard for five seasons. She currently hosts In Tune with Leila Cobo, an in-depth interview show with leading Latin artists that is seen on Reach TV in all U.S. airports.

Cobo is currently a member of the Nominating Committee of the Rock and Roll Hall of Fame.

== Personal life and music career ==
Cobo was born in Cali, Colombia, and is of Lebanese descent. Her father, doctor Alex Cobo, was a philanthropist and surgeon who founded the school of surgery at Universidad del Valle in Cali. She earned a bachelor's degree in journalism from Bogotá's Javeriana University. She got her second degree in piano performance from Manhattan School of Music in New York City and concertized extensively. Cobo had an active career as a classical pianist in her home country, performing as a soloist with Colombia's Symphony Orchestra (Orquesta Sinfonica de Colombia), Orquesta Sinfonica de Antioquia in Medellin and Orquesta Sinfonica del Valle in Cali, among others. She was also featured multiple times in Biblioteca Luis Angel Arango's concert series, performing as a soloist and in chamber groups. Cobo's last performance as a soloist was performing Prokofiev's Piano Concerto No. 3 with Orquesta Sinfonica del Valle. Although she would later perform sporadically, she dedicated herself to her communications career, obtaining a Fulbright Scholarship and getting a degree in Communication management from the USC Annenberg School for Communication and Journalism at the University of Southern California.

== Career at Billboard ==
Cobo serves Chief Content Officer for Latin and Español for Billboard magazine, in charge of overseeing the brand's Latin music coverage and programming. In her position, she is in charge of programming Billboard's yearly Latin Music Conference & Awards, one of the Latin Music Industry's biggest events, and hosts its "Q&A's" with Latin music's stars. Cobo also helped launch billboardenespanol.com, the brand's Spanish-language site, and has been instrumental in expanding Billboard's coverage of Latin music which now includes an extensive digital component as well as videos and podcasts. As an expert in Latin music, she has been a panelist in numerous conferences, including BAFIM in Buenos Aires, Viña del Mar in Chile, LAMC, Bogotá Music Market, among many others. Cobo has written liner notes for major album releases, including for artists such as Shakira, Chayanne, Ricky Martin and Julio Iglesias.

== Writing ==
Cobo's first novel, Tell Me Something True, was published by Grand Central Publishing (a division of Hachette Book Group) in 2009. It received generally favorable reviews and Cobo was named a "New Voice" by Ingram Literary Magazine and her novel was named one of the Top 10 Hispanic books of the year by the Society of Latino and Hispanic Writers of San Antonio The novel achieved critical and commercial success. Tell Me Something True has since been released in two other languages, Italian and German.

Cobo's second novel, titled The Second Time We Met, was released on 29 February 2012, also from Grand Central, receiving favorable reviews from AP and Reuter's among others. The book was nominated for a Latino Book Award in Best Popular Fiction.

Cobo's third book is a biography of the recently deceased Jenni Rivera. Titled Jenni Rivera - La Increible Vida de una Mariposa Guerrera, the book was released 20 March 2013 on CA Press/Penguin and was the top-selling Spanish language book in the U.S.—following the Bible—for 10 weeks. It was the top-selling Spanish language biography in the U.S. for five straight weeks, according to Nielsen BookScan. The book was released in its English-language version 23 April. On 16 April 2014, Cobo released Apunta a Las Estrellas (Aim For the Stars), an inspirational guide for people seeking a career in music.

In 2017, Cobo collaborated with Puerto Rican singer Ednita Nazario in her widely acclaimed memoir, Una Vida.

Cobo's latest book is Decoding Despacito: An Oral History of Latin Music (Penguin), which was published in Spanish and English and also released as an audio book.

Cobo is also a contributor to the Billboard Illustrated Encyclopedia of Music, and her work was featured in the book of essays "Quinceañera."

== Television ==
Cobo hosted and produced six seasons of the show Estudio Billboard, which aired on Fox Life and V-Me. The show featured reviews and interviews with Latin music artists. Cobo currently hosts In Tune With Leila Cobo, an interview show featuring top Latin acts, which airs on Reach TV on airport screens around the world. She is also a frequent guest interviewer on the Telemundo network.

== Other work ==
Cobo's highly regarded interviews with Latin artists can be seen on Billboard.com and on Billboard's YouTube channel as well as on Reach TV. She has also been a part of the Los Angeles Times staff, as well as the pop music critic for the Miami Herald. Simultaneous with her work in Billboard, for six years she was also the content director of Nexos, the Spanish/Portuguese in-flight magazine of American Airlines.

She also contributes frequently to other publications like Latina Magazine, AARP and more, and has written liner notes for albums by numerous Latin stars, including Ricky Martin, Shakira (Credits of Shakira album), Julio Iglesias and Selena .

== Awards and honors ==
Cobo is a recipient of the prestigious Fulbright Scholarship, which allowed her to obtain her master's degree from the University of Southern California's Annenberg School of Communication.

She has been decorated with multiple awards, including 2017's Leading Latin Lady, given by the Latin Academy of Recording Arts and Sciences; the TJ Martell Trailblazer Award given in 2019; and the LAMC's 2020 "Wonder Women of Latin Music" award.

In March 2014, Cobo was named Woman of the Year by Latino Show Magazine in New York. She has also been named one of 12 South Florida Hispanic Women of Distinction (2012) and in 2008 she was recognized as one of the Most Influential People in Latin music by magazines Gatopardo and Revista Fuchsia. That same year, Ocean Drive Magazine named her one of its "Power Brokers". In 2007, she was the recipient of the Nielsen President's Award, for Excellence and the journalistic excellence award from Premios Orquidea, which is given to Colombians with an outstanding career abroad. She was presented with the Leading Ladies of Entertainment accolade by the Latin Recording Academy in 2017.
