= Luis Miguel (album) =

Studio album by Luis Miguel
- Released: 14 September 2010
- Studios: EastWest Studios; Record Plant (Hollywood, CA)
- Genre: Pop
- Length: 31:29
- Language: Spanish
- Label: Warner Music Latina
- Producer: Luis Miguel

Luis Miguel chronology
| No Culpes a La Noche (2009) | Luis Miguel (2010) | ¡México Por Siempre! (2017) |

Singles from Luis Miguel
- 1. "Labios de Miel" Released: 3 August 2010; 2. "Mujer de Fuego" Released: 12 January 2011

Luis Miguel is the 19th studio album by Mexican singer Luis Miguel, released on 14 September 2010 by Warner Music Latina. It is a pop album featuring uptempo tracks with several ballads with lyrics emphasizing romance. "Labios de Miel" was released as the album's lead single while "Mujer de Fuego" was launched to promote the special edition of the record. To further promote the record, Luis Miguel embarked on self-titled tour from September 2010 to May 2012. He performed in the Americas and Spain.

Upon its release, Luis Miguel was met with mixed reactions from music critics. The uptempo numbers were criticized for being bland and sounding too similar to his previous recordings, although the ballads, particularly the compositions by Armando Manzanero, were praised as the album's best tracks. Commercially, Luis Miguel reached number one in Argentina, Mexico, Spain, and the Billboard Top Latin Albums chart in the United States. It was certified gold in Chile, platinum in Argentina, and multi-platinum in Mexico.

== Background and recording ==
In 2008, Luis Miguel released his 18th studio album, Cómplices, which he co-produced with Spanish musician Manuel Alejandro with the latter composing and arranging all of its tracks. Although Luis Miguel's decision to collaborate with Manuel Alejandro was praised, the album was met with mixed reactions from music critics who found its musical style too similar to the artist's previous pop records. Cómplices was followed by No Culpes a la Noche (2009), a remix album of previously recorded material.

On 26 July 2010, Luis Miguel announced he was releasing a new single titled "Labios de Miel" ("Honey Lips") on 3 August 2010 and that it would be included on his upcoming studio album. The working title of the album was named after the track. Three days after releasing "Labio de Miel", Luis Miguel's record label Warner Music Latina announced that the album would launch on 14 September 2010 but did not disclose its final name. Its name, named after the artist himself, was announced a day before the album's release. Luis Miguel described as the record another chapter of his life. The album was recorded at the EastWest Studios and Record Plant Studio in Hollywood, California; the mixing was completed at Record Plant studio as well. The album was mastered at Capitol Studios.

== Composition ==
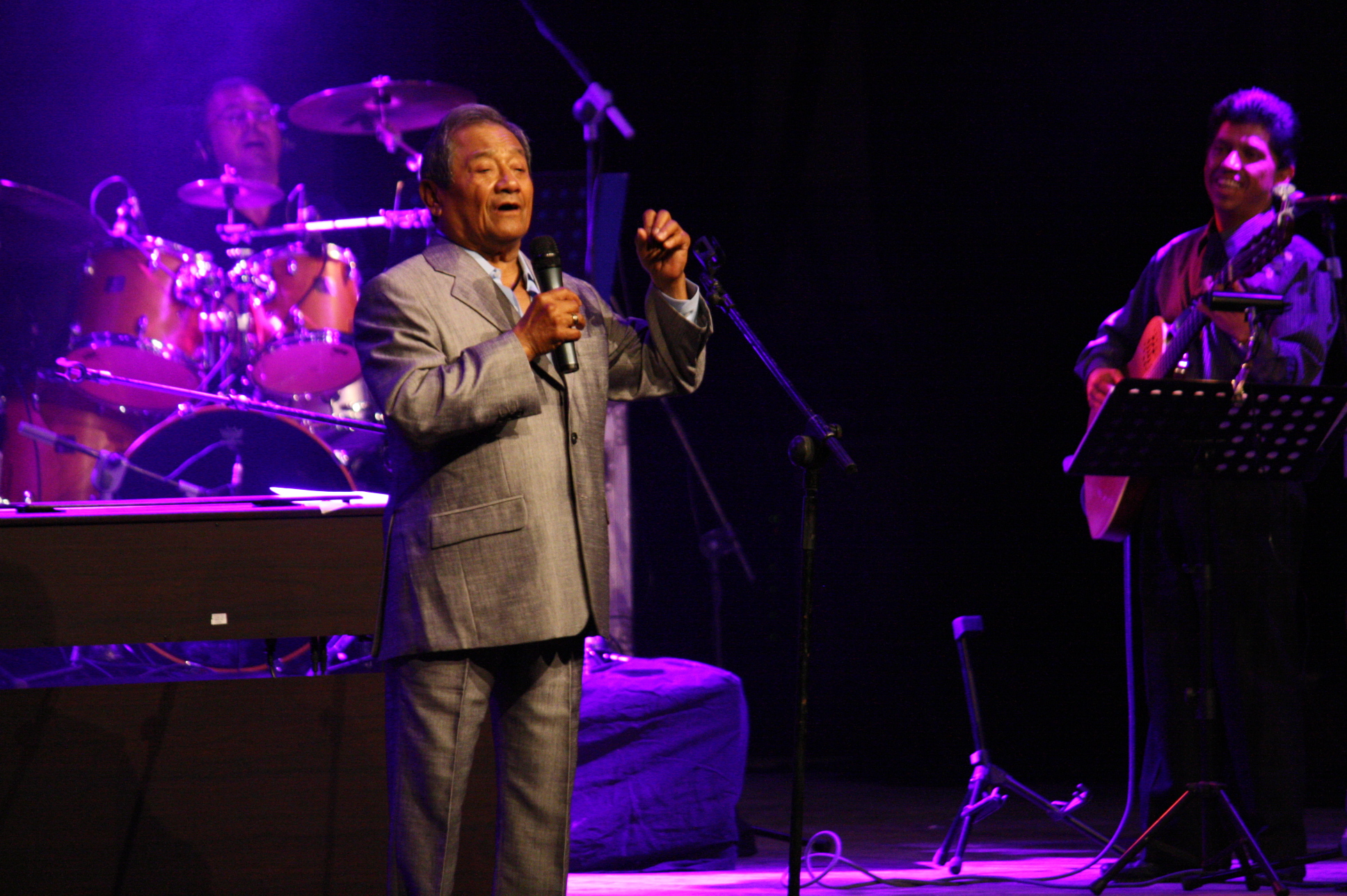
Luis Miguel recorded three compositions by Armando Manzanero (pictured) which were well received by music critics.

Whereas Cómplices emphasized on its ballads, Luis Miguel focuses more on up-tempo pop songs. AllMusic editor David Jeffries described the pop songs as a "returned to basics" drawing inspiration from 1980s-style disco music and features "Vegas horns" and swing brass instruments. "I try to choose a song that I like, that's all. I am not very much attracted to today's music. I like the melodies and notes from classical songs; that has been my influence. What I like to do, just like I've done with my past productions, is to choose the songs that motivate me, that fulfill me and transmit them to my audience", Luis Miguel said. The opening track "Labios de Miel" is reminiscent of his earlier song "Será Que No Me Amas" (1990). Most of the tracks were composed by Alejandro Carballo, Héctor E. Gutiérrez Francisco Loyo, Edgar Cortázar, and the artist himself.

As done on his earlier pop recordings such as Aries (1993) and Amarte Es un Placer (1999), the albums contains ballads including a cover of Osvaldo Farrés's bolero, "Tres Palabras", three compositions by Armando Manzanero ("No Existen Límites", "Lo Que Queda de Mí", and "De Quién Es Usted"), and "Siento". Lyrically, all ten tracks are love numbers with themes such as sex, suffering, and frustration. On "Siento", Take 6 performs as the background chorus as they had on Luis Miguel's song "Te Necesito". The closing track "Tal Vez Me Mientes" features a guitar solo by American musician Steve Lukather of Toto.

== Release and promotion ==
Luis Miguel was released internationally on 14 September 2010. A deluxe edition of the album was released on 18 January 2011 which contains remixes of "Labios de Miel", "Mujer de Fuego", "Tal Vez Me Mientes", and "Es Por Ti" done by Adrian Pieragostino. "Labios de Miel" launched as the album's lead single on his official website on 2 August 2010 and was commercially released the following day. The song reached number eight in Mexico according to Monitor Latino. In the US, it peaked at number 38 and ten on the Billboard Hot Latin Songs and Latin Pop Airplay charts, respectively. The dance remix of "Mujer de Fuego" was released on 12 January 2011 to promote the special edition of the album. "Tres Palabras" was the main theme for the Televisa's telenovela Triunfo del amor (2010).

=== Tour ===
To promote the album, Luis Miguel embarked on a 125 date tour on 15 September 2010 at The Colosseum at Caesars Palace in Las Vegas. The singer toured North America, South America and Spain. The tour ended on 12 May 2012 at the Palacio de los Deportes in Madrid, Spain. According to Pollstar, the tour grossed over $45 million from 78 shows reported and over 450,000 spectators. The tour's set list consisted of songs from the album, boleros, ballads and uptempo tracks from Luis Miguel's previous albums.

== Critical reception ==
Professional ratings
Review scores
| Source | Rating |
|---|---|
| AllMusic | 3/5 stars |
| Billboard | 3.5/5 stars |
| Vida en el Valle | 4/5 stars |

On its release, Luis Miguel was met with mixed reactions from critics, with the up-tempo tracks being criticized as uninspiring. AllMusic's Jeffries gave the album three out of five stars commenting that it is "filled with Latin pop that's built with radio play in mind". Billboard editor Leila Cobo rated it three-and-a-half out of five stars and claimed the up-tempo to be "less endearing" and dated. Similarly, Marcelo Contreras of El Mercurio was not amused with the dance tracks and regarded them as "bland and predictable". This sentiment was shared by La Nación reviewer Gabriel Plaza who found them to be boring. In a negative review of the record, Reforma critic Chucho Gallegos was disappointed that the artist did not take his two-year absence to come up with an innovative sound and found none of the tracks to be noticeable. In addition, Gallegos preferred Luis Miguel more as a singer than as a composer.

Writing in a more favorable view for Diario Popular, Wilmar Merino lauded the pop songs to be "contagious" as done in "Labios de Miel". In contrast to the other reviews, Olivia Ruiz of Vida en el Valle gave Luis Miguel four out of five stars and proclaimed that the dance numbers will "make you dance". However she conceded that none of the tracks stood out. The ballads, particularly "Tres Palabras" and the compositions by Manzanero, were more well received by music critics. Jeffries complimented the former track as "very lush". Cobo declared that the ballads are "[f]ar more enticing" and allowed his vocals to "soar even further" and the slower tracks "lend themselves to romanticized arrangements". Marino felt that "Tres Palabras" was the best track in the album. The Miami Herald critic Manuel C. Díaz found Manzanero's compositions to be a "trio of beautiful ballads". Similarly, Contreras called them "infallible" and among the best songs along with "Tres Palabras". Plaza stated that is the ballads where "he finds the reason for his style as a performer".

== Commercial performance ==
In Mexico, it debuted at the top of the Top 100 Mexico chart and spent three weeks on this spot. Luis Miguel received four platinum certifications by Asociación Mexicana de Productores de Fonogramas y Videogramas (AMPROFON) a week after its launch for shipping of 240,000 copies and was the ninth-best-selling album of 2010 in Mexico. In less a week the album reported 400,000 units sold in Mexico alone. In the US, Luis Miguel debuted and peaked at number 45 in the Billboard 200 on the week of 2 October 2010, for selling 9,000 copies. The album also debuted at number one on the Billboard Top Latin Albums and Latin Pop Albums chart.

In Spain the album reached number one on the album chart, and finished as the 48th-best-selling album of the year. In Argentina, the album reached number one and was certified platinum by the CAPIF, for shipping 40,000 copies, and finished the year as the sixth-best-selling album of the country. It was certified gold in Chile by IFPI Chile, and it was the fourth-best-selling album of the year.

== Track listing ==
| No. | Title | Writer(s) | Length |
|---|---|---|---|
| 1. | "Labios de Miel" | Alejandro Carballo; Angel Roberto Larrañaga Flores; Héctor E. Gutiérrez; Luis Miguel; Andrés Peláez Miranda | 3:55 |
| 2. | "Mujer de Fuego" | Carballo; Flores; Gutiérrez; Luis Miguel | 3:31 |
| 3. | "Tres Palabras" | Osvaldo Farrés | 2:55 |
| 4. | "Ella Es Así" | Carballo; Edgar Cortázar; Salo Loyo; Francisco Loyo; Luis Miguel | 2:46 |
| 5. | "No Existen Límites" | Alejandro Lerner; Armando Manzanero; Roberto Sorokin | 3:25 |
| 6. | "Siento" | Cortázar; F. Loyo; Luis Miguel | 3:20 |
| 7. | "Lo Que Queda de Mí" | Manzanero | 2:44 |
| 8. | "Es Por Ti" | Carballo; Flores; Gutiérrez; Luis Miguel | 3:44 |
| 9. | "De Quién Es Usted" | Manzanero | 2:41 |
| 10. | "Tal Vez Me Mientes" | Flores; F. Loyo; Luis Miguel; Flores | 2:38 |
| Total length: | | | 31:29 |

Edición de Lujo
| No. | Title | Writer(s) | Length |
|---|---|---|---|
| 11. | "Labios de Miel" (Dance remix) | Carballo; Flores; Gutiérrez; Luis Miguel; Miranda | 4:10 |
| 12. | "Mujer de Fuego" (Dance remix) | Carballo; Flores; Gutiérrez, Luis Miguel | 3:33 |
| 13. | "Tal Vez Me Mientes" (Dance remix) | Flores; F. Loyo; Luis Miguel; Flores | 2:53 |
| 14. | "Es Por Ti" (Dance remix) | Carballo; Flores; Gutiérrez; Luis Miguel | 3:32 |
| Total length: | | | 45:37 |

== Personnel ==
Adapted from the Luis Miguel liner notes:

=== Performance credits ===
- Lalo Carrillo – bass (all tracks)
- Victor Loyo – drums (all tracks)
- Henry Gutiérrez – guitar (tracks 1–2, 4, 6, 8, 10), rhythm arrangements & programming (1)
- George Doering – guitar (tracks 3, 5, 7, 9)
- Steve Lukather – guitar solo (track 10)
- Francisco Loyo – keyboards (tracks 3–4, 6, 10), synth solo (6), arrangements (3–7, 9–10), programming (4)
- Alejandro Carballo – keyboards (tracks 1–2, 4), electric piano (8), trombone (2), arrangements & programming (1–2, 4, 8)
- Andrés Peláez – keyboards (track 1)
- Salo Loyo – keyboards (tracks 4–5, 7, 9)
- Robbie Buchanan – electric piano (tracks 5, 7, 9)
- Jorge Calandrelli – electric piano, strings arrangements (track 3)
- Tommy Aros – percussion (all tracks)
- Jerry Hey – brass arrangements (tracks 1–2, 4, 6, 8, 10)
- Gary Grant – trumpet (tracks 1–2, 4, 6, 8, 10)
- Dan Fornero – trumpet (tracks 1–2, 4, 6, 8, 10)
- Arturo Solar – trumpet (track 2)
- Ramón Flores – trumpet solo (track 3)
- Dan Higgins – saxophone (tracks 1, 4, 6, 8, 10), tenor saxophone (2)
- Jeff Nathanson – baritone saxophone (track 2)
- Bill Reichenbach – trombone (tracks 1–2, 4, 6, 8, 10)
- Bill Ross – strings arrangements (tracks 5, 7, 9)
- Mark Kibble – chorus arrangements (track 6)
- Take 6 – chorus (track 6)
- Kenny O'Brien – chorus (tracks 1–2, 4, 8, 10)
- Carlos Murguía – chorus (tracks 1–2, 4, 8, 10)
- Will Wheaton – chorus (tracks 1–2, 4, 8, 10)
- Giselda Vatcky – chorus (tracks 1–2, 4, 8, 10)
- Bambi Jones – chorus (tracks 1–2, 4, 8, 10)
- Terry Wood – chorus (tracks 1–2, 4, 8, 10)
- Sergio Granados – chorus (tracks 1, 10)
- Edgar Cortazar – chorus (track 4)

=== Technical credits ===
- Luis Miguel – producer
- Moogie Canazio – engineer, mixer
- David Reitzas – audio mixing
- Ron McMaster – mastering engineer
- Shari Sutcliffe – production coordinator
- Bill Ross – orchestra director
- Alejandro Carballo – orchestra director
- Jorge Calandrelli – orchestra director
- Francisco Loyo – pre-production and programming
- Salo Loyo – pre-production and programming
- Pete Rauls – recording assistant and mixing
- Ghazi Hourani – recording assistant and mixing
- Mimi "Audia" Parker – recording assistant and mixing
- Mitch Kenny – recording assistant and mixing
- Julian Peploe Studio – graphic design

=== Recording and mixing locations ===
- EastWest Studios, Hollywood, CA – recording
- Record Plant Studios, Hollywood, CA – recording, mixing
- Capitol Mastering, Hollywood, CA – mastering

== Charts ==
=== Weekly charts ===
Weekly chart performance for Luis Miguel
| Chart (2010) | Peak position |
|---|---|
| Argentine Albums Chart | 1 |
| European Top 100 Albums | 47 |
| Mexican Albums Chart | 1 |
| Spanish Albums Chart | 1 |
| US Billboard 200 | 45 |
| US Top Latin Albums (Billboard) | 1 |
| US Latin Pop Albums (Billboard) | 1 |

Weekly chart performance for Luis Miguel: Edición de Lujo
| Chart (2011) | Peak position |
|---|---|
| Argentine Albums Chart | 14 |

=== Year-end charts ===
2010 year-end chart performance for Luis Miguel
| Chart (2010) | Position |
|---|---|
| Argentina (CAPIF) | 6 |
| Chile (IFPI) | 4 |
| Mexico (Top 100 AMPROFON) | 9 |
| Spain (PROMUSICAE) | 48 |
| US Top Latin Albums (Billboard) | 52 |
| US Latin Pop Albums (Billboard) | 15 |

2011 year-end chart performance for Luis Miguel
| Chart (2011) | Position |
|---|---|
| Mexico (Top 100 AMPROFON) | 93 |

== Certifications and sales ==
| Region | Certification | Certified units/sales |
|---|---|---|
| Argentina | Platinum | |
| Chile | Gold | 7,500 |
| Mexico (AMPROFON) | 4× Platinum | 400,000 |

== Release history ==
Release dates and formats for Luis Miguel
| Region | Date | Format | Edition | Label |
|---|---|---|---|---|
| United States | 14 September 2010 | CD | Standard | Warner Music Latina |
| Mexico | 14 September 2010 | CD | Standard | Warner Music Mexico |
| Europe | 14 September 2010 | CD | Standard | Warner Music Mexico |
| Colombia | 14 September 2010 | CD | Standard | Warner Music Mexico |
| Venezuela | 14 September 2010 | CD | Standard | Warner Music Mexico |
| Argentina | 14 September 2010 | CD | Standard | Warner Music Argentina |
| Brazil | 14 September 2010 | CD | Standard | Warner Music Brazil |
| United States | 18 January 2011 | CD | Deluxe | Warner Music Latina |
| Europe | 18 January 2011 | CD | Deluxe | Warner Music Mexico |
| Argentina | 18 January 2011 | CD | Deluxe | Warner Music Argentina |

== See also ==
- 2010 in Latin music
- List of number-one albums of 2010 (Mexico)
- List of number-one albums of 2010 (Spain)
- List of number-one debuts on Billboard Top Latin Albums
- List of number-one Billboard Latin Albums from the 2010s
- List of Billboard Latin Pop Albums number ones from the 2010s
