= The Hits Tour (Luis Miguel) =

2012–13 concert tour by Luis Miguel

- Tour by Luis Miguel
- Promotional poster for the tour
- Start date: August 30, 2012
- End date: December 21, 2013
- Legs: 3
- No. of shows: 73 in North America; 25 in South America; 98 total

Luis Miguel concert chronology
- Luis Miguel Tour (2010–12); The Hits Tour (2012–13); Deja Vu Tour (2014–15)

The Hits Tour was a concert tour performed by Mexican singer Luis Miguel.

== History ==
The tour started in Fresno and then participated in the "People in Spanish Festival" in San Antonio. He visited various cities in the United States and Mexico such as Ciudad Juarez, Tijuana, Mexicali, Irvine, Highland and Las Vegas.

He flew to South America for concerts in Argentina (Corrientes, Buenos Aires, Cordoba and Rosario) and Chile (Antofagasta, Santiago, Mostazal and Concepcion).

In 2013, he went to Mexico to make 34 presentations across the country. The cities visited were: Mexico City, Pachuca, Aguascalientes, Guadalajara, Leon, Tampico, Monterrey, Tepic, Chihuahua, Hermosillo, Cualiacan, Acapulco, and Puebla.

In August 2013 he participated in the "North Sea Jazz Festival" in Curacao. In September 2013, he held concerts in the United States in the following cities: El Paso, Las Vegas, Temecula, Tucson, Palm Springs, Reno, Bakersfield, Dallas and Austin.

In November, he continued his tour in Dominican Republic, Peru, Venezuela and returned to four cities in Colombia after 9 years (he last visited that country during the 33 Tour in 2004).

== Tour set list ==
The Hits Tour: (10 shows) Aug 30, 2012 – Sep 15, 2012

The Hits Tour: (10 shows) August 30, 2012 – September 15, 2012
No.	Title	Original album	Length
1.	"Intro"
2.	"Mujer de Fuego"	Luis Miguel
3.	"Suave"	Aries
4.	"Si Te Vas"	Nada Es Igual
5.	"Me Niego A Estar Solo"	Aries
6.	"Speech / Contigo En La Distancia"	Romance
7.	"La Mentira"	Romance
8.	"No Sé Tú"	Romance
9.	"Boleros Medley" (Por Debajo De La Mesa / La Gloria Eres Tú / Bésame Mucho)	Romances
10.	"Sol Arena Y Mar"	Amarte Es Un Placer
11.	"Up Tempo Medley" (Un Hombre Busca Una Mujer / Cuestión de Piel / Oro de Ley)	Busca Una Mujer, 20 Años
12.	"Esa Niña"	Busca Una Mujer
13.	"Oldies Ballads Medley" (No Me Puedes Dejar Así / Palabra de Honor / Entrégate / La Incondicional)	Decídete, Palabra De Honor, 20 Años, Busca Una Mujer
14.	"Tu Y Yo"	Aries
15.	"Interlude (Trumpet) / Come Fly With Me"	Duets II
16.	"Ayer"	Aries
17.	"Dame Tu Amor"	Aries
18.	"Te Necesito"	33
19.	"Interlude (Son De La Negra)"
20.	"El Rey"	El Concierto
21.	"Mariachi Medley" (Que Seas Felíz / Y / De Que Manera Te Olvido / La Bikina / El Viajero)	México En La Piel, Vivo
22.	"Mariachi Medley" (Si Nos Dejan / Échame A Mí La Culpa / Sabes Una Cosa)	El Concierto, México En La Piel
23.	"Mariachi Medley" (Cielito Lindo / Que Bonita Es Mi Tierra / Viva México, Viva América)
24.	"Oldies Medley" (Decídete / Muchachos de Hoy / Ahora Te Puedes Marchar / La Chica Del Bikini Azul / Isabel / Cuando Calienta El Sol)	Decídete, Fiebre De Amor, Soy Como Quiero Ser, Palabra de Honor
25.	"Labios De Miel"	Luis Miguel

The Hits Tour: (17 shows) October 13, 2012 – November 6, 2012

The Hits Tour: (17 shows) October 13, 2012 – November 6, 2012
No.	Title	Album Original	Length
1.	"Intro"
2.	"Mujer de Fuego"	Luis Miguel
3.	"Suave"	Aries
4.	"Si Te Vas"	Nada Es Igual
5.	"Speech / Contigo En La Distancia"	Romance
6.	"La Mentira"	Romance
7.	"No Sé Tú"	Romance
8.	"Boleros Medley" (Por Debajo De La Mesa / La Gloria Eres Tú / Bésame Mucho)	Romances
9.	"Sol, Arena Y Mar"	Amarte Es Un Placer
10.	"Up Tempo Medley" (Un Hombre Busca Una Mujer / Cuestión de Piel / Oro de Ley)	Busca Una Mujer, 20 Años
11.	"Esa Niña"	Busca Una Mujer
12.	"Oldies Ballads Medley" (No Me Puedes Dejar Así / Palabra de Honor / Entrégate / La Incondicional)	Decídete, Palabra de Honor, 20 Años, Busca Una Mujer
13.	"Tu Y Yo"	Aries
14.	"Interlude (Trumpet) / Come Fly With Me"	Duets II
15.	"Tangos Medley (Only in Argentina)" (Por Una Cabeza / Volver / Uno / El Dia Que Me Quieras)	Mis Romances, Romances, Segundo Romance
16.	"Dame Tu Amor (Only in Argentina)"	Aries
17.	"Te Necesito"	33
18.	"Que Nivel De Mujer"	Aries
19.	"Oldies Medley" (Decídete / Muchachos de Hoy / Ahora Te Puedes Marchar / La Chica Del Bikini Azul / Isabel / Cuando Calienta El Sol)	Decídete, Fiebre De Amor, Soy Como Quiero Ser, Palabra de Honor
20.	"Labios De Miel"	Luis Miguel

The Hits Tour: (34 shows) January 31, 2013 – March 23, 2013

The Hits Tour: (34 shows) January 31, 2013 – March 23, 2013
No.	Title	Original album	Length
1.	"Intro"
2.	"Mujer de Fuego"	Luis Miguel
3.	"Suave"	Aries
4.	"Si Te Vas"	Nada Es Igual
5.	"Speech / Historia De Un Amor (Contigo En La Distancia Only first concert)"	Segundo Romance
6.	"La Mentira"	Romance
7.	"No Sé Tú"	Romance
8.	"Boleros Medley" (Por Debajo De La Mesa / La Gloria Eres Tú / Bésame Mucho)	Romances
9.	"Sol, Arena Y Mar"	Amarte Es Un Placer
10.	"Up Tempo Medley" (Un Hombre Busca Una Mujer / Cuestión de Piel / Oro de Ley)	Busca Una Mujer, 20 Años
11.	"Esa Niña (Only in the first four concerts & Puebla)"	Busca Una Mujer
12.	"Oldies Ballads Medley" (No Me Puedes Dejar Así / Palabra de Honor / Entrégate / La Incondicional)	Decídete, Palabra De Honor, 20 Años, Busca Una Mujer
13.	"Hasta Que Me Olvides (Only in Puebla)"	Aries
14.	"Tu y Yo (Only in the first four concerts & Puebla)"	Aries
15.	"Interlude (Trumpet) / Come Fly With Me"	Duets II
16.	"Te Necesito"	33
17.	"Interlude (Son De La Negra)"
18.	"El Rey"	El Concierto
19.	"Mariachi Medley" (Que Seas Felíz / Y / De Que Manera Te Olvido / La Bikina / El Viajero)	México En La Piel, Vivo
20.	"Mariachi Medley (Only in the first four concerts & Puebla)" (Si Nos Dejan / Échame A Mí La Culpa / Sabes Una Cosa)	El Concierto, México En La Piel
21.	"Mariachi Medley" (Cielito Lindo / Que Bonita Es Mi Tierra / Viva México, Viva América)
22.	"Oldies Medley" (Decídete / Muchachos de Hoy / Ahora Te Puedes Marchar / La Chica Del Bikini Azul / Isabel / Cuando Calienta El Sol)	Decídete, Fiebre De Amor, Soy Como Quiero Ser, Palabra de Honor
23.	"Labios De Miel"	Luis Miguel

The Hits Tour: (14 shows) August 31, 2013 – September 25, 2013

The Hits Tour: (13 shows) August 31, 2013 – September 25, 2013
No.	Title	Original album	Length
1.	"Intro"
2.	"Mujer de Fuego"	Luis Miguel
3.	"Suave"	Aries
4.	"Si Te Vas"	Nada Es Igual
5.	"Speech / Historia De Un Amor"	Segundo Romance
6.	"La Mentira"	Romance
7.	"Tres Palabras (Sometimes)"	Luis Miguel
8.	"Contigo En La Distancia (Sometimes)"	Romance
9.	"No Sé Tú"	Romance
10.	"Y Sigo (Sometimes)"	33
11.	"Sol, Arena Y Mar"	Amarte Es Un Placer
12.	"Options (O Tú O Ninguna, Hasta Que Me Olvides or Voy A Apagar La Luz / Contigo Aprendi)"	Amarte Es Un Placer, Aries, Romance
13.	"Interlude (Trumpet) / ¿Quien Será?"
14.	"J.C. Calderón Medley" (Amante del Amor / Más Allá de Todo / Fría Como El Viento / Tengo Todo Excepto A ti)	Busca Una Mujer, 20 Años
15.	"Esa Niña (Sometimes)"	Busca Una Mujer
16.	"Oldies Ballads Medley" (No Me Puedes Dejar Así / Palabra de Honor / Entrégate / La Incondicional)	Decídete, Fiebre De Amor, 20 Años, Busca Una Mujer
17.	"Up Tempo Medley" (Un Hombre Busca Una Mujer / Cuestión de Piel / Oro de Ley)	Busca Una Mujer, 20 Años
18.	"Interlude (Trumpet) / Come Fly With Me"	Duets II
19.	"Te Necesito"	33
20.	"Interlude (Son De La Negra)"
21.	"El Rey"	El Concierto
22.	"Mariachi Medley" (Que Seas Felíz / Y / De Que Manera Te Olvido / La Bikina / El Viajero)	México En La Piel, Vivo
23.	"Amanecí En Tus Brazos (Only Las Vegas)"	El Concierto
24.	"México En La Piel (Only Las Vegas)"	México En La Piel
25.	"Motivos (Only Las Vegas)"	México En La Piel
26.	"Mariachi Medley" (Cielito Lindo / Que Bonita Es Mi Tierra / Viva México, Viva América)
27.	"Que Nivel De Mujer (Only in Curaçao)"	Aries
28.	"Oldies Medley" (Decídete / Muchachos de Hoy / Ahora Te Puedes Marchar / La Chica Del Bikini Azul / Isabel / Cuando Calienta El Sol)	Decídete, Fiebre De Amor, Soy Como Quiero Ser, Palabra de Honor
29.	"Labios De Miel"	Luis Miguel

The Hits Tour: (8 shows) Nov 2, 2013 – Nov 16, 2013

The Hits Tour: (8 shows) November 2, 2013 – November 16, 2013
No.	Title	Original album	Length
1.	"Intro"
2.	"Mujer de Fuego"	Luis Miguel
3.	"Suave"	Aries
4.	"Si Te Vas"	Nada Es Igual
5.	"Speech / Historia De Un Amor"	Segundo Romance
6.	"La Mentira"	Romance
7.	"Tres Palabras"	Luis Miguel
8.	"No Sé Tú (Sometimes)"	Romance
9.	"La Barca (Sometimes)"	Romance
10.	"Voy A Apagar La Luz / Contigo Aprendi (Sometimes)"	Romances
11.	"Romances Medley (Sometimes)" (Por Debajo de la Mesa / La Gloria Eres Tú / Besame Mucho)	Romances
12.	"Sol Arena y Mar"	Amarte Es Un Placer
13.	"Hasta Que Me Olvides"	Aries
14.	"Esa Niña"	Busca Una Mujer
15.	"Interlude (Trumpet) / ¿Quien Será?"
16.	"J.C. Calderón Medley" (Amante del Amor / Más Allá de Todo / Fría Como El Viento / Tengo Todo Excepto A ti)	Busca Una Mujer, 20 Años
17.	"Up Tempo Medley Medley" (Un Hombre Busca Una Mujer / Cuestión de Piel / Oro de Ley)	Busca Una Mujer, 20 Años
18.	"Oldies Ballads Medley" (No Me Puedes Dejar Así / Palabra de Honor / Entrégate / La Incondicional)	Decídete, Palabra de Honor, 20 Años, Busca Una Mujer
19.	"Y Sigo (Sometimes)"	33
20.	"Tu Y Yo (Only Altos De Chavón)"	Aries
21.	"Interlude (Trumpet) / Come Fly With Me"	Duets II
22.	"Te Necesito"	33
23.	"Mariachi Medley (Only Colombia)" (Que Seas Feliz / Y / De Que Manera te Olvido / La Bikina / El Viajero)	México En La Piel, Vivo
24.	"Que Nivel de Mujer (Sometimes)"	Aries
25.	"Oldies Medley" (Decídete / Muchachos de Hoy / Ahora Te Puedes Marchar / La Chica Del Bikini Azul / Isabel / Cuando Calienta El Sol)	Decídete, Fiebre De Amor, Soy Como Quiero Ser, Palabra de Honor
26.	"Labios De Miel"	Luis Miguel

The Hits Tour: (15 shows) Nov 30, 2013 – Dec 20, 2013

The Hits Tour: (15 shows) November 30, 2013 – December 20, 2013
No.	Title	Original album	Length
1.	"Intro"
2.	"Mujer de Fuego"	Luis Miguel
3.	"Suave"	Aries
4.	"Si Te Vas"	Nada Es Igual
5.	"Speech / Historia De Un Amor"	Segundo Romance
6.	"La Mentira"	Romance
7.	"No Sé Tú"	Romance
8.	"La Barca"	Romance
9.	"Sol Arena y Mar"	Amarte Es Un Placer
10.	"«Options (Voy A Apagar La Luz/Contigo Aprendi, O Tú O Ninguna, Esa Niña, Hasta Que Me Olvides o Por Debajo De La Mesa/La Gloria Eres Tú/Bésame Mucho(Only Auditorio Banamex December,8)»"	Romances, Amarte Es Un Placer, Busca Una Mujer, Aries, Mis Boleros Favoritos
11.	"Esa Niña"	Busca Una Mujer
12.	"J.C. Calderón Medley" (Amante del Amor / Más Allá de Todo / Fría Como El Viento / Tengo Todo Excepto A ti)	Busca Una Mujer, 20 Años
13.	"Fiebre de Amor (Only in Mexicali)"	Fiebre De Amor
14.	"Ballads Medley" (No Me Puedes Dejar Así / Palabra de Honor / Entrégate / La Incondicional)	Decídete, Palabra De Honor, 20 Años, Busca Una Mujer
15.	"Interlude (Trumpet) / ¿Quien Será?"
16.	"Up Tempo Medley Medley" (Un Hombre Busca Una Mujer / Cuestión de Piel / Oro de Ley)	Busca Una Mujer, 20 Años
17.	"Interlude (Trumpet) / Come Fly With Me"	Duets II
18.	"Santa Claus Llegó a la Ciudad"	Navidades
19.	"Frente a la Chimenea"	Navidades
20.	"Te Necesito"	33
21.	"Interlude (Son De La Negra)"
22.	"El Rey"	El Concierto
23.	"Mariachi Medley" (Que Seas Feliz / Y / De Que Manera te Olvido / La Bikina / El Viajero)	México En La Piel, Vivo
24.	"México en la Piel"	México En La Piel
25.	"Mariachi Medley" (Cielito Lindo / Que Bonita Es Mi Tierra / Viva México, Viva América)
26.	"Entrega Total (Only Auditorio Nacional)"	México En La Piel
27.	"Amanecí En Tus Brazos (Only Auditorio Nacional)"	México En La Piel
28.	"Mi Ciudad"	México En La Piel
29.	"Oldies Medley" (Decídete / Muchachos de Hoy / Ahora Te Puedes Marchar / La Chica Del Bikini Azul / Isabel / Cuando Calienta El Sol)	Decídete, Fiebre De Amor, Soy Como Quiero Ser, Palabra De Honor
30.	"Labios De Miel"	Luis Miguel

== Tour dates ==
List of concerts, showing date, city, country, venue, tickets sold, number of available tickets and amount of gross revenue
Date	City	Country	Venue	Attendance	Revenue
North America
August 30, 2012	Fresno	United States	Save Mart Center	4,632 / 5,839	$107,040
September 2, 2012	San Antonio	United States	Alamodome (People en Español Festival)	—N/a	—N/a
September 4, 2012	Ciudad Juárez	Mexico	Estadio Olímpico Benito Juárez	—N/a	—N/a
September 6, 2012	Highland	United States	San Manuel Indian Bingo & Casino	—N/a	—N/a
September 7, 2012	Irvine	United States	Verizon Wireless Amphitheatre	—N/a	—N/a
September 8, 2012	Tijuana	Mexico	Estadio Caliente	—N/a	—N/a
September 9, 2012	Mexicali	Mexico	Estadio Casas GEO	—N/a	—N/a
September 13, 2012	Las Vegas	United States	The Colosseum at Caesars Palace	12,321 / 12,321	$2,048,855
September 14, 2012	Las Vegas	United States	The Colosseum at Caesars Palace	12,321 / 12,321	$2,048,855
September 15, 2012	Las Vegas	United States	The Colosseum at Caesars Palace	12,321 / 12,321	$2,048,855
South America
October 13, 2012	Corrientes	Argentina	Estadio Club Huracán	—N/a	—N/a
October 15, 2012	Buenos Aires	Argentina	La Rural	—N/a	—N/a
October 16, 2012	Buenos Aires	Argentina	Estadio G.E.B.A.	—N/a	—N/a
October 17, 2012	Buenos Aires	Argentina	Estadio G.E.B.A.	—N/a	—N/a
October 19, 2012	Buenos Aires	Argentina	Estadio G.E.B.A.	—N/a	—N/a
October 20, 2012	Buenos Aires	Argentina	Estadio G.E.B.A.	—N/a	—N/a
October 21, 2012	Buenos Aires	Argentina	Estadio G.E.B.A.	—N/a	—N/a
October 22, 2012	Buenos Aires	Argentina	La Rural	—N/a	—N/a
October 24, 2012	Rosario	Argentina	Hipódromo del Parque Independencia	—N/a	—N/a
October 26, 2012	Córdoba	Argentina	Orfeo Superdomo	—N/a	—N/a
October 27, 2012	Córdoba	Argentina	Orfeo Superdomo	—N/a	—N/a
October 30, 2012	Antofagasta	Chile	Ruinas de Huanchaca	—N/a	—N/a
November 1, 2012	Santiago	Chile	Movistar Arena	—N/a	—N/a
November 2, 2012	Santiago	Chile	Movistar Arena	—N/a	—N/a
November 3, 2012	Santiago	Chile	Movistar Arena	—N/a	—N/a
November 4, 2012	Mostazal	Chile	Monticello Grand Casino	—N/a	—N/a
November 6, 2012	Concepción	Chile	Estadio Municipal de Concepción	—N/a	—N/a
North America
January 31, 2013	Mexico City	Mexico	National Auditorium	35,438 / 38,080	$2,399,949
February 1, 2013	Mexico City	Mexico	National Auditorium	35,438 / 38,080	$2,399,949
February 2, 2013	Mexico City	Mexico	National Auditorium	35,438 / 38,080	$2,399,949
February 3, 2013	Mexico City	Mexico	National Auditorium	35,438 / 38,080	$2,399,949
February 7, 2013	Pachuca	Mexico	Estadio Hidalgo	—N/a	—N/a
February 8, 2013	Mexico City	Mexico	National Auditorium	27,284 / 28,560	$2,116,192
February 9, 2013	Mexico City	Mexico	National Auditorium	27,284 / 28,560	$2,116,192
February 10, 2013	Mexico City	Mexico	National Auditorium	27,284 / 28,560	$2,116,192
February 14, 2013	Mexico City	Mexico	National Auditorium	36,244 / 38,080	$2,896,833
February 15, 2013	Mexico City	Mexico	National Auditorium	36,244 / 38,080	$2,896,833
February 16, 2013	Mexico City	Mexico	National Auditorium	36,244 / 38,080	$2,896,833
February 17, 2013	Mexico City	Mexico	National Auditorium	36,244 / 38,080	$2,896,833
February 19, 2013	Aguascalientes	Mexico	Estadio de Béisbol Alberto Romo Chávez	—N/a	—N/a
February 21, 2013	Guadalajara	Mexico	Telmex Auditorium	22,183 / 24,738	$2,092,242
February 22, 2013	Guadalajara	Mexico	Telmex Auditorium	22,183 / 24,738	$2,092,242
February 23, 2013	Guadalajara	Mexico	Telmex Auditorium	22,183 / 24,738	$2,092,242
February 26, 2013	León	Mexico	Poliforum León	—N/a	—N/a
February 28, 2013	Tampico	Mexico	Expo Tampico	4,433 / 5,253	$426,465
March 2, 2013	Monterrey	Mexico	Auditorio Banamex	—N/a	—N/a
March 3, 2013 (Note: The March 3, 2013, concert at Auditorio Banamex in Monterrey was originally scheduled to take place on March 1, but was postponed.)	Monterrey	Mexico	Auditorio Banamex	—N/a	—N/a
March 4, 2013	Tepic	Mexico	Feria del Pueblo	—N/a	—N/a
March 5, 2013	Guadalajara	Mexico	Telmex Auditorium	11,384 / 16,492	$800,159
March 6, 2013	Guadalajara	Mexico	Telmex Auditorium	11,384 / 16,492	$800,159
March 8, 2013	Mexico City	Mexico	National Auditorium	27,643 / 28,560	$1,811,722
March 9, 2013	Mexico City	Mexico	National Auditorium	27,643 / 28,560	$1,811,722
March 10, 2013	Mexico City	Mexico	National Auditorium	27,643 / 28,560	$1,811,722
March 11, 2013	Monterrey	Mexico	Auditorio Banamex	—N/a	—N/a
March 13, 2013	Chihuahua	Mexico	Estadio Olímpico de la UACH	—N/a	—N/a
March 15, 2013	Hermosillo	Mexico	Estadio Héroe de Nacozari	—N/a	—N/a
March 17, 2013	Culiacán	Mexico	Estadio Banorte	—N/a	—N/a
March 20, 2013	Mexico City	Mexico	National Auditorium	14,046 / 19,040	$565,897
March 21, 2013	Mexico City	Mexico	National Auditorium	14,046 / 19,040	$565,897
March 22, 2011	Acapulco	Mexico	Forum de Mundo Imperial	—N/a	—N/a
March 23, 2013	Puebla	Mexico	Auditorio Siglo XXI	—N/a	—N/a
South America
August 31, 2013	Willemstad	Curaçao	World Trade Center Curaçao (Curaçao North Sea Jazz Festival)	—N/a	—N/a
North America
September 10, 2013	Delicias	Mexico	Private Show	—N/a	—N/a
September 11, 2013	El Paso	United States	Don Haskins Center	5,628 / 12,000	$578,008
September 13, 2013	Las Vegas	United States	The Colosseum at Caesars Palace	12,538 / 12,538	$2,115,895
September 14, 2013	Las Vegas	United States	The Colosseum at Caesars Palace	12,538 / 12,538	$2,115,895
September 15, 2013	Las Vegas	United States	The Colosseum at Caesars Palace	12,538 / 12,538	$2,115,895
September 17, 2013	Temecula	United States	Pechanga Resort and Casino	1,197 / 4,000	$227,371
September 19, 2013	Tucson	United States	Anselmo Valencia Tori Amphitheater	3,513 / 5,000	$230,812
September 20, 2013	Indio	United States	Fantasy Springs Resort Casino	2,805 / 2,805	$278,720
September 21, 2013	Reno	United States	Reno Events Center	3,327 / 7,500	$288,132
September 22, 2013	Bakersfield	United States	Kern County Fairgrounds	—N/a	—N/a
September 24, 2013	Grand Prairie	United States	Verizon Theatre at Grand Prairie	3,832 / 4,977	$384,703
September 25, 2013	Austin	United States	Frank Erwin Center	3,217 / 4,676	$333,088
November 2, 2013	La Romana	Dominican Republic	Altos de Chavón	—N/a	—N/a
South America
November 7, 2013	Lima	Peru	Jockey Club del Perú	5,985 / 6,500	$894,734
November 9, 2013	Caracas	Venezuela	Estadio de Fútbol de la Universidad Simón Bolívar	1,764 / 5,220	$505,589
November 10, 2013	Valencia	Venezuela	Forum de Valencia	2,948 / 8,400	$108,147
November 12, 2013	Tunja	Colombia	Estadio La Independencia	4,707 / 10,450	$104,155
November 14, 2013	Medellín	Colombia	Plaza de Toros La Macarena	2,535 / 2,700	$462,960
November 15, 2013	Bogotá	Colombia	C.C Bima	3,719 / 9,300	$332,199
November 16, 2013	Barranquilla	Colombia	Estadio Tomás Arrieta	1,903 / 2,100	$297,117
North America
November 30, 2013	Tijuana	Mexico	Estadio Caliente	—N/a	—N/a
December 1, 2013	Mexicali	Mexico	Plaza de Toros Calafia	—N/a	—N/a
December 4, 2013	Metepec	Mexico	Explanada del Recinto Ferial	—N/a	—N/a
December 5, 2013	Mexico City	Mexico	National Auditorium	19,040 / 19,040	$1,497,608
December 6, 2013	Mexico City	Mexico	National Auditorium	19,040 / 19,040	$1,497,608
December 7, 2013	Monterrey	Mexico	Auditorio Banamex	11,333 / 13,084	$941,910
December 8, 2013	Monterrey	Mexico	Auditorio Banamex	11,333 / 13,084	$941,910
December 10, 2013	San Luis Potosí	Mexico	El Domo	—N/a	—N/a
December 13, 2013	Guadalajara	Mexico	Telmex Auditorium	11,568 / 16,744	$1,150,956
December 14, 2013	Guadalajara	Mexico	Telmex Auditorium	11,568 / 16,744	$1,150,956
December 15, 2013	Puebla	Mexico	Auditorio Siglo XXI	—N/a	—N/a
December 17, 2013	Querétaro	Mexico	Auditorio Josefa Ortiz de Domínguez	—N/a	—N/a
December 18, 2013	Veracruz	Mexico	World Trade Center Veracruz	—N/a	—N/a
December 19, 2013	Villahermosa	Mexico	Teatro Parque Tabasco	—N/a	—N/a
December 20, 2013	Mérida	Mexico	Estadio Carlos Iturralde	—N/a	—N/a
December 21, 2013	Cancún	Mexico	Mandala Beach Club	—N/a	—N/a
Total				297,167 / 363,997 (82%)	$25,997,458

== Cancelled shows ==
List of cancelled concerts, showing date, city, country, venue, and reason for cancellation
Date	City	Country	Venue	Reason
October 10, 2012	Montevideo	Uruguay	Velodromo Municipal	Logistical Problems

== Awards and records ==
- On September 2, 2012, in the "People in Spanish Festival" Miguel was awarded a "Lifetime Achievement Award" and proclaimed "Mayor for a Day" in the city of San Antonio, Texas.
- Miguel received, on October 22, 2012, in Argentina at the hands of President Cristina Kirschner, a plaque in recognition of his 100 presentations in that country (1982–2012).
- In October 2012 he was named "distinguished guest" by the city of Antofagasta.
- On September 13, 2013, in Las Vegas, Miguel was awarded with "Diamond Award", a certificate from the Nevada Governor's Office for his contributions to the state, a certificate from the United States Senate recognizing him as one of the top Hispanic artists in the world, and "Day of Luis Miguel".
- In April 2014 Miguel won a "Billboard Latin Music Award": "Tour of the Year".

== Band ==
- Piano: Francisco Loyo
- Acoustic & electric guitar: Todd Robinson
- Bass: Lalo Carrillo
- Keyboards & programming: Salo Loyo
- Drums: Victor Loyo
- Percussion: Tommy Aros
- Saxophone: Jeff Nathanson
- Trumpet: Ramón Flores
- Trumpet: Peter Olstad
- Trombone: Alejandro Carballo
- Backing vocals: Lucila Polak (2012), Kasia Sowinska (2012–2013)
