= No Culpes a la Noche =

Remix album by Luis Miguel
- Released: 22 September 2009
- Genre: Latin house
- Length: 54:10
- Language: Spanish
- Label: Warner Music Latina

Luis Miguel chronology
Cómplices (2008)	No Culpes a la Noche (2009)	Luis Miguel (2010)

Singles from No Culpes a La Noche
- 1. "Será Que No Me Amas (Hex Hector Mix)" Released: 31 August 2009

No Culpes a la Noche – The Club Remixes is the first remix album by Mexican singer Luis Miguel. It was released on 22 September 2009, by Warner Music Latina. The album features 10 previously recorded tracks by the artist remixed by several disc jockeys (DJs) including Hex Hector, Danny Saber, and Dario Gomez & Vlad Diaz. To promote the album, the remix of "Será Que No Me Amas" was released as its lead promotional single.

No Culpes a la Noche was met with divided reviews by Music critics, with one reviewer praising Luis Miguel's vocals and choice of DJs, while another criticized the tracks as monotonous and hard to differentiate. Commercially, it reached three in Mexico where it was certified Platinum and Gold and number 11 in Spain. In the United States, the album ranked at numbers ten, four, and two on the Billboard Dance/Electronic Albums, Top Latin Albums, and Latin Pop Albums charts, respectively. Within its first day of release, the album sold over 200,000 copies.

== Background and content ==
In 2008, Luis Miguel released his 18th studio album, Cómplices, which he co-produced with Spanish musician Manuel Alejandro with the latter composing and arranging all of its tracks. Although Luis Miguel's decision to collaborate with Manuel Alejandro was praised, the album was met with mixed reactions from music critics who found its musical style too similar to the artist's previous pop records. On 24 August 2009, it was announced that Luis Miguel would release a remix album titled No Culpes a la Noche and that it would be released on 22 September 2009. According to a spokesperson from Luis Miguel's record label Warner Music Mexico: "We did it thinking that it would be a purely 'anterior' material, so that it would play in all the bars, in the clubs, so that it would set the beat and people would get hooked on these new releases".

No Culpes a la Noche contains ten remixes of previously recorded songs. Several disc jockeys (DJs) who worked on the remixes include Hex Hector ("Cómo Es Posible Que a Mi Lado", "Será Que No Me Amas", and "Te Propongo Esta Noche"), Dario Gomez & Vlad Diaz ("Eres" and "Suave"), and Danny Saber ("Sol, Arena y Mar"). Danny Saber previously remixed three versions of "Sol, Arena y Mar" on the song's release in 1999. The Hex Hector remix of "Tu Imaginación" was originally released as a digital download for the special edition of Cómplices in 2009. The remix of "Será Que No Me Amas" was released as the lead promotional single from the album.

== Reception ==
Writing a positive review for AllMusic, Dave Shim felt No Culpes a la Noche "marries the singer’s prodigious talent for song with bumping club grooves" and noted that "[w]hile the beats are far from cutting-edge, mining familiar Latin house and filter house styles from the late-‘90s, they’re largely unobtrusive and frame Miguel’s persuasive vocals nicely". Vida en el Valle critic Olivia Ruiz rated the disc three stars out of five complimenting "Suave" and "Será Que No Me Amas" as stand outs, but criticized the song selections as "not the best one" and lamented the exclusion of Luis Miguel's more popular hits like "La Incondicional". Overall, Ruiz stated it is "definitely ideal for your next party". Tommy Calle of the Los Angeles Times gave the record a negative review and regarded the tracks as "monotonous and difficult to differentiate between track to track". Gerardo González V, who also gave it an unfavorable review, remarked that the disc was "made with little ambition and a lot of laziness".

Commercially, it reached number three in Mexico where it was certified Platinum and Gold for shipping over 90,000 copies, while in Spain it peaked at number 11. In the US, it peaked at number 180 on the Billboard 200 chart as well as numbers ten, four, and two on the Billboard Dance/Electronic Albums, Top Latin Albums, and Latin Pop Albums charts, respectively. Within its first day of release, the album sold over 200,000 copies.

== Track listing ==
No.	Title	Writer(s)	Length
1.	"Alguien Como Tú (Somebody in Your Life)" (ROCAsound Mix)	Diane Warren; Robbie Buchanan; Luis Angel Marquez	5:56
2.	"Cómo Es Posible Que a Mi Lado" (Hex Hector Mix)	Luis Miguel; Kiko Cibrian; Alejandro Asensi	4:43
3.	"Si Te Vas" (ROCAsound Mix)	Orlando Castro; Salvador Tercero; Cibrian	5:10
4.	"Eres" (Dario Gomez & Vlad Diaz Mix)	Luis Miguel; Edgar Cortázar; Salo Loyo; Francisco Loyo	5:14
5.	"Suave" (Dario Gomez & Vlad Diaz Mix)	Castro; Cibrian	5:16
6.	"Será Que No Me Amas" (Hex Hector Mix)	Mick Jackson; Elmar Krohn; Juan Carlos Calderón	4:42
7.	"Sol, Arena y Mar" (Danny Saber Club Mix)	Luis Miguel; F. Loyo; S. Loyo; Arturo Pérez	4:35
8.	"Vuelve" (Arena Mix)	Asensi; Cortázar; Luis Miguel; F. Loyo	4:14
9.	"Te Propongo Esta Noche" (Hex Hector Mix)	Luis Miguel; Calderón; Pérez; Asensi	6:12
10.	"Tu Imaginación" (Hex Hector Mix)	Manuel Alejandro; Pepe Dougan; Víctor Feijóo	7:53
Total length:			54:10

== Charts ==
=== Weekly charts ===
Chart performance for No Culpes a la Noche
Chart (2009)	Peak position
Argentine Albums (CAPIF)	1
Chilean Albums (IFPI)	1
Mexican Albums (Top 100 Mexico)	3
Spanish Albums (PROMUSICAE)	11
US Billboard 200	180
US Top Dance Albums (Billboard)	10
US Top Latin Albums (Billboard)	4
US Latin Pop Albums (Billboard)	2

=== Year-end charts ===
2009 year-end chart performance for No Culpes a la Noche
Chart (2009)	Position
Mexico (Top 100 AMPROFON)	33

== Certifications and sales ==
Region	Certification	Certified units/sales
Mexico (AMPROFON)	Platinum+Gold	90,000^{^}
United States First-week sales	—	3,000
Summaries
Worldwide First-day sales	—	200,000
^{^} Shipments figures based on certification alone.
