= The Hits Tour =

The Hits Tour may refer to:

- The Hits Tour (Luis Miguel)
- The Hits Tour (Toni Braxton)
- The Wild Dreams Tour or The Hits Tour (Westlife)
