= List of number-one albums of 2010 (Spain) =

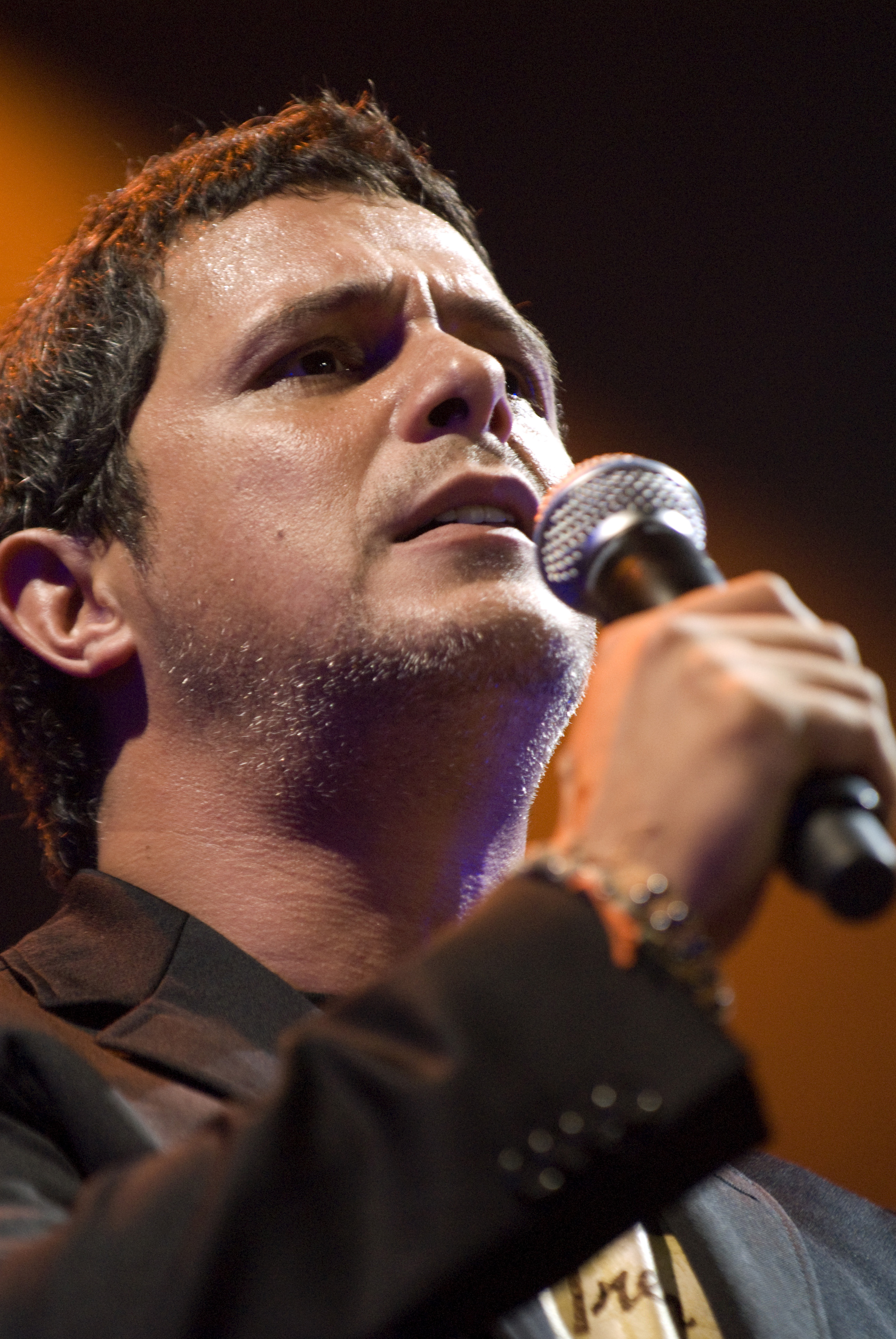
Spanish singer Alejandro Sanz peaked at number-one with his eighth studio album Paraíso Express in 2009 and 2010.

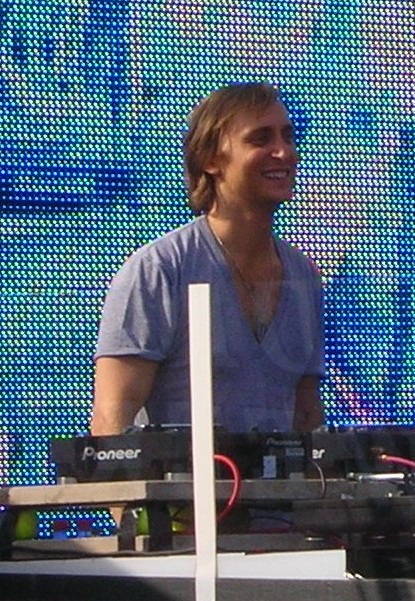
French DJ David Guetta peaked at number-one for six non-consecutives weeks with his fourth studio album One Love.

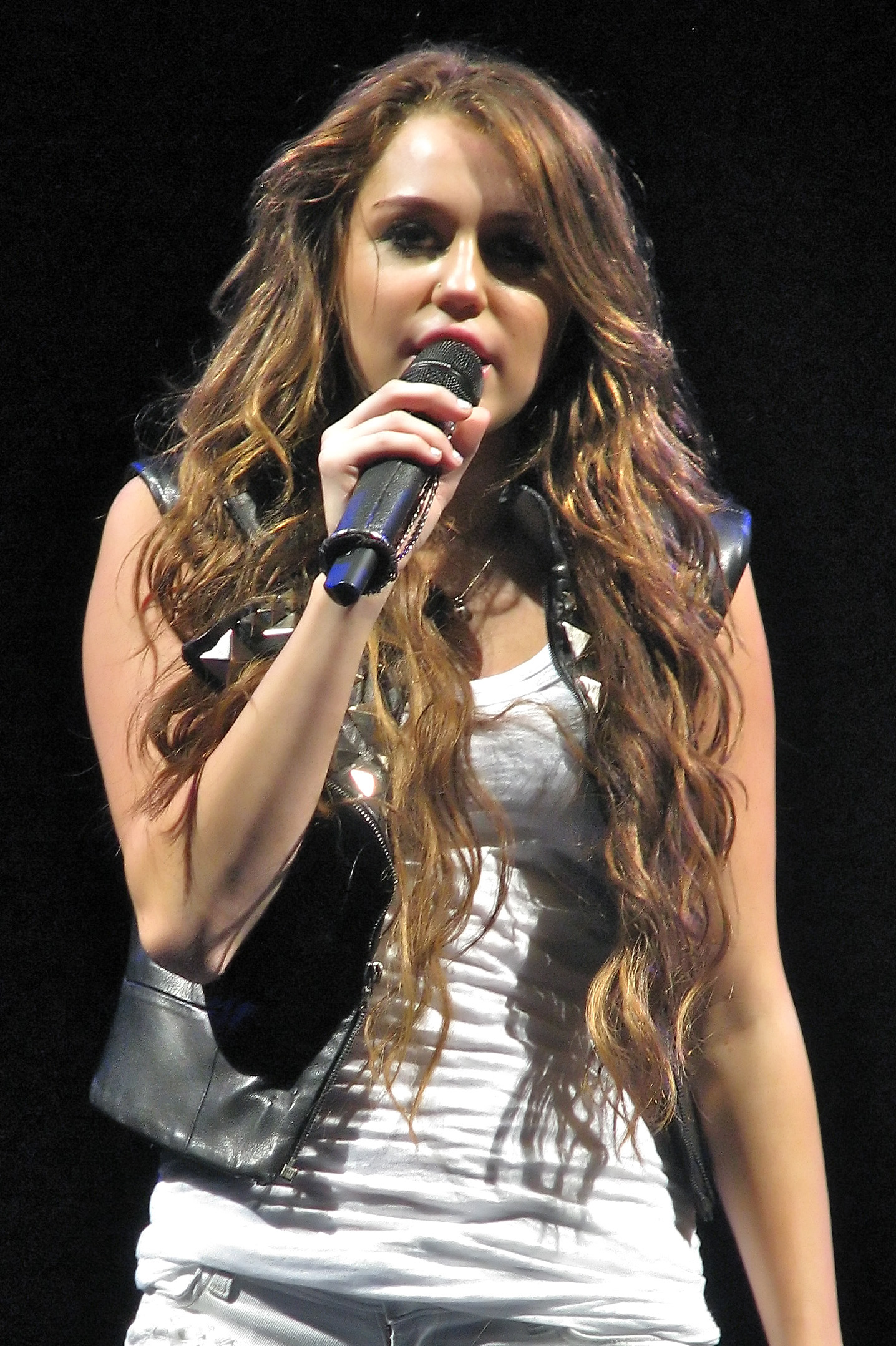
American singer Miley Cyrus peaked at number-one for two consecutives weeks with her studio album Can't Be Tamed.

Top 100 España is a record chart published weekly by PROMUSICAE (Productores de Música de España), a non-profit organization composed by Spain and multinational record companies. This association tracks record sales (physical and digital) in Spain.

== Albums ==
Chart date	Album	Artist	Reference
January 10	Vinagre y Rosas	Joaquín Sabina	
January 17	Paraíso Express	Alejandro Sanz	
January 24	Paraíso Express	Alejandro Sanz	
January 31	Paraíso Express	Alejandro Sanz	
February 7	X-Anniversarium	Estopa	
February 14	Soldier of Love	Sade	
February 21	Las Consecuencias	Bunbury	
February 28	Hijo de la Luz y de la Sombra	Juan Manuel Serrat	
March 7	A Contracorriente	David Bustamante	
March 14	Cardio	Miguel Bosé	
March 21	Hijo de la Luz y de la Sombra	Juan Manuel Serrat	
March 28	Cardio	Miguel Bosé	
April 4	Trece	Sergio Dalma	
April 11	Gaia III: Atlantia	Mägo de Oz	
April 18	Gaia III: Atlantia	Mägo de Oz	
April 25	Hijo de la Luz y de la Sombra	Juan Manuel Serrat	
May 2	Cardio	Miguel Bosé	
May 9	My Worlds	Justin Bieber	
May 16	My Worlds	Justin Bieber	
May 23	My Worlds	Justin Bieber	
May 30	Iconos	Marc Anthony	
June 6	On the Rock	Andrés Calamaro	
June 13	One Love	David Guetta	
June 20	A Son de Guerra	Juan Luis Guerra	
June 26	Can't Be Tamed	Miley Cyrus	
July 4	Can't Be Tamed	Miley Cyrus	
July 11	Euphoria	Enrique Iglesias	
July 18	Euphoria	Enrique Iglesias	
July 25	One Love	David Guetta	
August 1	One Love	David Guetta	
August 8	One Love	David Guetta	
August 15	One Love	David Guetta	
August 22	The Final Frontier	Iron Maiden	
August 29	The Final Frontier	Iron Maiden	
September 5	One Love	David Guetta	
September 12	Lo Que el Viento Me Dejó	Arrebato	
September 19	Luis Miguel	Luis Miguel	
September 26	Luis Miguel	Luis Miguel	
October 3	Señales de Humo	Rulo y La Contrabanda	
October 10	Acordes de Mi Diario	Merche	
October 17	Guerra Fría	Malú	
October 24	Sale el Sol	Shakira	
October 31	Pequeño	Dani Martín	
November 7	Pequeño	Dani Martín	
November 14	Pequeño	Dani Martín	
November 21	The Promise	Bruce Springsteen	
November 28	Via Dalma	Sergio Dalma	
December 5	Via Dalma	Sergio Dalma	
December 12	Via Dalma	Sergio Dalma	
December 19	Via Dalma	Sergio Dalma	
December 26	Via Dalma	Sergio Dalma	
January 2	Via Dalma	Sergio Dalma	

== See also ==
- List of number-one singles of 2010 (Spain)
