= Navidades =

Studio album by Luis Miguel
- Released: 14 November 2006
- Studios: Ocean Way Recording, Hollywood, CA; Right Track Recording, New York, NY
- Genre: Big band
- Length: 30:58
- Language: Spanish
- Label: Warner Music Latina
- Producer: Luis Miguel

Luis Miguel chronology
Grandes Éxitos (2005)	Navidades (2006)	Cómplices (2008)

Singles from Navidades
- 1. "Mi Humilde Oracion" / "Santa Claus Llego a la Ciudad" Released: 23 October 2006

Navidades (transl. Christmas) is the 17th studio album by Mexican singer Luis Miguel, which Warner Music Latina released on 14 November 2006. It is Miguel's first Christmas album, and features Spanish-language adaptations of English-language songs and carols consisting of big band numbers and string-laden ballads. Édgar Cortázar and Juan Carlos Calderón adapted the songs and Miguel produced the album. To promote Navidades, "Mi Humilde Oración" ("Grown-Up Christmas List") and "Santa Claus Llegó a la Ciudad" ("Santa Claus Is Comin' to Town") were simultaneously released as lead singles, and Luis Miguel performed two tracks from the album on the set list on the third leg of his México En La Piel Tour (2005–07) in November and December 2006.

Upon its release, Navidades received mostly mixed reviews from music critics. While commending Luis Miguel's vocals and the album's musical styles, reviewers were divided on the adaptations. Navidades was nominated as Best Latin Pop Album at the 50th Annual Grammy Awards (2008), and Latin Pop Album of the Year by a Male Artist at the 2007 Latin Billboard Music Awards. The album reached number one in Mexico and on the Billboard Top Latin Albums chart in the United States, and the top ten in Argentina and Spain. It was the first Spanish-language album since 1966 to rank on the Billboard Top Holiday Albums. By November 2015, the record had sold over 1.1 million copies.

== Background and recording ==
In 2004, Luis Miguel released México en la Piel, a collection of mariachi standards. He spent two years promoting the album through the México En La Piel Tour (2005–2007). After the finishing the third leg of the tour at the Mandalay Bay Events Center in Las Vegas, Nevada, in April 2006, Miguel decided to take a break from performing, announcing he would release a new album and resume touring by the end of the year. On 5 October 2006, it was announced that the album would be a holiday album of 11 traditional Christmas carols sung in Spanish, to be released on 14 November. At a press conference on the eve of the album's release, Miguel said: "The conception of this album, Navidades, I have been maturing for years because I have always felt that at Christmas there are great records in English, but not in Spanish. So it seemed like a good idea to record one."

Navidades was recorded at the Ocean Way Recording in Hollywood and the Right Track Recording in New York City, and was produced by Luis Miguel. The album features uptempo, big-band numbers and string-laden ballads. Miguel recruited Juan Carlos Calderón—who has worked with Miguel since the 1980s—and Édgar Cortázar to write the Spanish-language versions of the songs. While several songs such as "Santa Claus is Comin' to Town" were translated, others, including "Rudolph the Red-Nosed Reindeer", were rewritten in Spanish with lyrics unrelated to the original. "Rudolph the Red-Nose Reindeer" was reworked as "Frente a la Chimenea" ("In Front of the Chimney") and makes no mention of the titular character. According to Cortázar, "They wanted lyrics Luis Miguel style".

== Promotion ==
"Mi Humilde Oración" ("Grown-Up Christmas List") and "Santa Claus Llegó a la Ciudad" ("Santa Claus is Comin' to Town") were simultaneously released as the album's lead singles on 23 October 2006. "Mi Humilde Oración" peaked at number 31 on the Billboard Latin Pop Airplay chart and "Santa Claus Llegó a la Ciudad" peaked at number 26 on the same chart. The music video for "Santa Claus Llegó a la Ciudad" was filmed in New York City, and was directed by Rebecca Blake and released on 21 November 2006. To further promote Navidades, "Santa Claus Llegó a la Ciudad" and "Frente a la Chimenea" were included on the set list for the third leg of the México En La Piel Tour in November and December 2006.

== Critical reception and accolades ==
Professional ratings
Review scores
Source	Rating
Allmusic	2/5 stars
Montreal Gazette	3.5/5 stars
Vida en el Valle	5/5 stars

Upon its release, music critics gave Navidades generally mostly positive reviews. Billboard's Leila Cobo noted while "hearing these songs in Spanish be disconcerting to some, where the lyrics diverge completely from the originals", and said Miguel's traditional arrangements "work well for the uptempo numbers" and the "string-laden contemplative fare". Reforma critic Beto Castillo praised the arrangements and musicians. Castillo enjoyed Calderón's take on the songs, but criticized those by Cortázar, including "Frente la Chimenea". R. Garza of Vida en el Valle rated the album five stars, complimenting Miguel's voice, the big band arrangements, and "Noche de Paz", his take on "Silent Night". Garza said the album would only be listened to during the holiday season and said Miguel could have recorded more tracks and included a DVD with bonus features. A writer for Vista magazine gave the album a positive review, stating: "This collaboration gives the songs a new resonance for the whole family, evoking the happiness and hope of the holidays and the excitement and nostalgia of the season".

Charlie Fidelman of the Montreal Gazette rated the album three-and-a-half stars out of five, highlighting the artist's ability to stay "romantic in all guises", and complimented his "expressive tenor voice" and the big-band ensemble. AllMusic reviewer Evan C. Gutierrez was more critical of the album, giving it two stars and criticizing the singer for not having "a drop of class or elegance that comes with such commitment" in regards to recording a jazz album. Gutierrez regarded the song choices as "more silly than playful". Writing for El Sentinel, Eliseo Cardona listed Navidades as one of the worst albums of 2006, stating nobody should have to pay the artist to "hear him sing Christmas songs that in gringo land are already taken for guachafas" (a low class person with poor manners and little education).

At the 50th Annual Grammy Awards in 2008, Navidades was nominated for Best Latin Pop Album, becoming the first Christmas album to be nominated in this category, but lost to El Tren de los Momentos (2006) by Alejandro Sanz. It was also nominated in the category of Latin Pop Album by a Male Artist at the 2007 Latin Billboard Music Awards but lost to Amor (2006) by Andrea Bocelli.

== Commercial performance ==
In Mexico, Navidades debuted at number one in the Top 100 Mexico chart, where it remained for three weeks. Navidades was certified diamond by Asociación Mexicana de Productores de Fonogramas y Videogramas (AMPROFON) almost two months after its launch for sales of 500,000 copies and was the fourth-best-selling album of 2006 in Mexico. By October 2008 the album reported 700,000 units sold in Mexico alone. In the US, Navidades debuted and peaked at number 51 in the Billboard 200 on the week of 2 December 2006, and was the first all-Spanish album to appear on Billboard's holiday chart since 1966, peaking at number seven on this chart. The album also debuted at number one on the Billboard Top Latin Albums chart. It sold 145,000 units in the US up to July 2009 and was awarded a double-platinum certification in the Latin field by the Recording Industry Association of America (RIAA) for shipments of 200,000 units.

In Spain, Navidades reached number four on the album chart and was certified gold by Productores de Música de España (PROMUSICAE) for shipping over 40,000 copies, making it the 34th-best-selling album of the year. In Argentina, the album reached number two and was certified platinum by the CAPIF. It was certified gold in Chile and Venezuela by International Federation of the Phonographic Industry Chile and Asociación Venezolana de Intérpretes y Productores de Fonogramas (AVINPRO), respectively. As of November 2015, Navidades had sold over 1.1 million units worldwide.

== Track listing ==
All tracks produced by Luis Miguel.

No.	Title	Writer(s)	Spanish lyrics / adaptation	Length
1.	"Santa Claus Llegó a la Ciudad (Santa Claus Is Coming to Town)"	Fred Coots; Haven Gillespie	Juan Carlos Calderón	1:56
2.	"Te Deseo Muy Felices Fiestas (Have Yourself a Merry Little Christmas)"	Hugh Martin; Ralph Blane	Calderón	4:16
3.	"Frente a la Chimenea (Rudolph the Red-Nosed Reindeer)"	Johnny Marks	Edgar Cortázar	1:55
4.	"Blanca Navidad (White Christmas)"	Irving Berlin	Calderón	3:30
5.	"Navidad, Navidad (Jingle Bells)"	traditional	Calderón	2:34
6.	"Estaré en Mi Casa Esta Navidad (I'll Be Home for Christmas)"	Walter Kent; Kim Gannon; Buck Ram	Calderón	2:48
7.	"Mi Humilde Oración (Grown-Up Christmas List)"	David Foster; Linda Thompson	Calderón	3:18
8.	"Va a Nevar (Let It Snow)"	Jule Styne; Sammy Cahn	Cortázar	1:52
9.	"Sonríe (Smile)"	Charles Chaplin; John Turner; Geoffrey Parsons		3:07
10.	"Llegó la Navidad (Winter Wonderland)"	Felix Bernard; Dick Smith	Cortázar	2:06
11.	"Noche de Paz (Silent Night)"	traditional	Calderón	3:41
Total length:				30:58

== Personnel ==
Adapted from the Navidades liner notes:

=== Performance credits ===
Musicians

- Robbie Buchanan – electric piano (tracks 2, 4, 6–7, 9), hammond organ (11)
- Michael Lang – piano (tracks 3, 8, 11)
- Francisco Loyo – piano (tracks 1, 5, 10)
- Randy Waldman – piano (tracks 7, 11)
- Nathan East – bass (tracks 1, 3, 5, 10)
- Abraham Laboriel – bass (tracks 2, 4, 6–7, 9, 11)
- Robert Hurst – bass (track 8)
- Vinnie Colaiuta – drums (tracks 1, 3, 5, 8, 10)
- John Robinson – drums (tracks 2, 4, 6–7, 9, 11)
- George Doering – guitar (all tracks)
- Paul Jackson Jr. – guitar (tracks 2, 4, 6–7, 9, 11)
- Thomas Aros – percussion (all tracks)
- Dan Higgins – alto saxophone, tenor saxophone (track 11)
- Robert Carr – saxophone (tracks 1, 3, 5, 8, 10)
- Keith Fiddmont – saxophone (tracks 1, 3, 5, 8, 10)
- Brandon Fields – saxophone (tracks 1, 3, 5, 8, 10)
- Robert Lockart – saxophone (tracks 1, 3, 5, 8, 10)
- Thomas Peterson – saxophone (tracks 1, 3, 5, 8, 10)
- Bijon Watson – trumpet (tracks 1, 3, 5, 8, 10)
- Gilberto Castellanos – trumpet (tracks 1, 3, 5, 8, 10)
- Charles Davis – trumpet (tracks 1, 3, 5, 8, 10)
- Ronald King – trumpet, trombone (tracks 1, 3, 5, 8, 10)
- George Bohanan – trombone (tracks 1, 3, 5, 8, 10)
- Richard Bullock – trombone (tracks 1, 3, 5, 8, 10)
- Ira Nepus – trombone (tracks 1, 3, 5, 8, 10)

Orchestra

- Brian Byrne – orchestra director (tracks 1, 3, 5, 8, 10)
- Timothy Davis – orchestra director (tracks 2, 4, 6–7, 9)
- Bruce Dukov – director, first violin (tracks 2, 4, 6)
- Ralph Morrison – director, first violin (tracks 7, 9)
- Razdan Kuyumjian – violin (tracks 2, 4, 6–7, 9)
- John Wittenberg – violin (tracks 2, 4, 6–7, 9)
- Armen Anassian – violin (tracks 2, 4, 6)
- Charlie Bisharat – violin (tracks 2, 4, 6)
- Caroline Campbell – violin (tracks 2, 4, 6)
- Kevin Connolly – violin (tracks 2, 4, 6)
- Mario DeLeon – violin (tracks 2, 4, 6)
- Julie Gigante – violin (tracks 2, 4, 6)
- Alan Grunfeld – violin (tracks 2, 4, 6)
- Peter Kent – violin (tracks 2, 4, 6)
- Natalie Leggett – violin (tracks 2, 4, 6)
- Phillip Levy – violin (tracks 2, 4, 6)
- Liane Mautner – violin (tracks 2, 4, 6)
- Horia Moroaica – violin (tracks 2, 4, 6)
- Sid Page – violin (tracks 2, 4, 6)
- Alyssa Park – violin (tracks 2, 4, 6)
- Sara Parkins – violin (tracks 2, 4, 6)
- Michele Richards – violin (tracks 2, 4, 6)
- Guillermo Romero – violin (tracks 2, 4, 6)
- Josefina Vergara – violin (tracks 2, 4, 6)
- Margaret Wooten – violin (tracks 2, 4, 6)
- Jackie Brand – violin (tracks 7, 9)
- Rebecca Bunnell – violin (tracks 7, 9)
- Nicole Bush – violin (tracks 7, 9)
- Franklyn D'Antonio – violin (tracks 7, 9)
- Kristin Fife – violin (tracks 7, 9)
- Clayton Haslop – violin (tracks 7, 9)
- Tiffnay Yi Hu – violin (tracks 7, 9)
- Patricia Johnson – violin (tracks 7, 9)
- Aimee Kreston – violin (tracks 7, 9)
- Robert Matsuda – violin (tracks 7, 9)
- Frances Moore – violin (tracks 7, 9)
- Robert Peterson – violin (tracks 7, 9)
- Tereza Stanislav – violin (tracks 7, 9)
- Rachel Stegeman – violin (tracks 7, 9)
- Charles Stegeman – violin (tracks 7, 9)
- Edmund Stein – violin (tracks 7, 9)
- Mari Tsumura – violin (tracks 7, 9)
- Miwako Watanabe – violin (tracks 7, 9)
- Andrew Duckles – viola (tracks 2, 4, 6)
- Matthew Funes – viola (tracks 2, 4, 6)
- Keith Greene – viola (tracks 2, 4, 6)
- Shawn Mann – viola (tracks 2, 4, 6)
- Dan Neufeld – viola (tracks 2, 4, 6)
- Karie Prescott – viola (tracks 2, 4, 6)
- Harry Shrinian – viola (tracks 2, 4, 6)
- David Walther – viola (tracks 2, 4, 6)
- Robert Berg – viola (tracks 7, 9)
- Robert Brophy – viola (tracks 7, 9)
- Ken Burward-Hoy – viola (tracks 7, 9)
- Carole Kleister Castillo – viola (tracks 7, 9)
- John Hayhurst – viola (tracks 7, 9)
- Carrie Holzman-Little – viola (tracks 7, 9)
- Renita Koven – viola (tracks 7, 9)
- Carolyn Riley – viola (tracks 7, 9)
- Larry Corbett – cello (tracks 2, 4, 6–7, 9)
- Paula Hochhalter – cello (tracks 2, 4, 6–7, 9)
- Dane Little – cello (tracks 2, 4, 6–7, 9)
- Daniel Smith – cello (tracks 2, 4, 6–7, 9)
- Rudolph Stein – cello (tracks 2, 4, 6–7, 9)
- Steve Richards – cello (tracks 2, 4, 6)
- Kevan Torfeh – cello (tracks 7, 9)
- Peter Sheridan – flute (tracks 2, 4, 6–7, 9)
- Heather Susan Greenberg – flute (tracks 2, 4, 6)
- James Walker – flute (tracks 2, 4, 6)
- Steve Kujala – flute (tracks 2, 4, 6)
- Heather Clark – flute (tracks 7, 9)
- Martin Glicklich – flute (tracks 7, 9)
- David Shostac – flute (tracks 7, 9)
- Earle Dumler – oboe (tracks 2, 4, 6)
- Barbara Northcutt – oboe (tracks 7, 9)
- Tommy Morgan – harmonica (tracks 2, 7, 9)
- James Atkinson – french horn (tracks 2, 4, 6)
- Steven Becknell – french horn (tracks 2, 4, 6)
- Brad Warnaar – french horn (tracks 2, 4, 6)
- Joseph Meyer – french horn (tracks 7, 9)
- Todd Miller – french horn (tracks 7, 9)
- Phillip Yao – french horn (tracks 7, 9)

Gospel choir (track 11)

- Paulina Aguirre
- Carmen Carter
- Lynn Blythe Davis
- Alice Sanderson Echols
- Cleto Escobedo II
- Nikisha Greer
- Bambi Natisse Jones
- Kristle Murden
- Dan Navarro
- Kenny O'Brien
- Darryl Phinnessee
- Louis Price
- Carmen Twillie
- Gisa Vatcky
- Julia Waters-Tillman
- Maxine Waters-Willard
- Oren Waters
- Will Wheaton

=== Technical credits ===
- Luis Miguel – producer
- Alejandro Asensi – ejecutive producer
- Juan Carlos Calderón – arrangements and musical direction
- Francisco Loyo – music co-production
- Rafa Sardina – engineer, mixer
- Allen Sides – audio engineer
- David Reitzas – audio mixing
- Shari Sutcliffe – production coordinator
- Wesley Seidman – recording assistant
- Chris Jennings – recording assistant
- Lizette Rangel – recording assistant
- Matty Green – mix assistant
- Alan Mason – mix assistant
- Ron McMaster – mastering engineer
- Alberto Tolot – photography
- Jeri Heiden – graphic design
- Jennifer Pyle – graphic design

=== Recording and mixing locations ===
- Ocean Way Studios, Hollywood, CA – recording
- Right Track Recording, New York, NY – recording
- Chalice Studios, Hollywood, CA – mixing
- Capitol Mastering, Hollywood, CA – mastering

== Chart performance ==
=== Weekly charts ===
Weekly chart performance for Navidades
Chart (2006)	Peak position
Argentine Albums (CAPIF)	2
Mexico Top 100 AMPROFON	1
Spanish Albums (Promusicae)	4
US Billboard 200	51
US Top Holiday Albums (Billboard)	7
US Top Latin Albums (Billboard)	1
US Latin Pop Albums (Billboard)	1
US Billboard European Top 100 Albums	82

=== Monthly charts ===
Monthly chart performance for Navidades
Chart (2006)	Peak position
Argentine Albums (CAPIF)	5
Uruguay International (CUD)	5

=== Year-end charts ===
2006 year-end chart performance for Navidades
Chart (2006)	Position
Mexico Top 100 AMPROFON	4
Spanish Albums (PROMUSICAE)	34

2007 year-end chart performance for Navidades
Chart (2007)	Position
US Top Latin Albums (Billboard)	19
US Latin Pop Albums (Billboard)	9

== Sales and certifications ==
Certifications and sales for Navidades
Region	Certification	Certified units/sales
Argentina (CAPIF)	Platinum	40,000^{^}
Chile	Gold	
Mexico (AMPROFON)	Diamond	700,000
Spain (Promusicae)	Gold	40,000^{^}
United States (RIAA)	2× Platinum (Latin)	145,000
Venezuela	Gold	
Summaries
Worldwide	—	1,100,000
^{^} Shipments figures based on certification alone.

== Release history ==
Release dates and formats for Navidades
Region	Date	Format	Edition	Label
Europe	14 November 2006	CD	Standard	Warner Music Latina
United States	14 November 2006	CD	Standard	Warner Music Latina
Argentina	14 November 2006	CD	Standard	Warner Music Latina
Mexico	14 November 2006	CD	Standard	Warner Music Latina
Venezuela	14 November 2006	CD	Standard	Warner Music Latina
Brazil (Note: Released in Brazil as Feliz Natal.)	14 November 2006	CD	Standard	Warner Music Latina
Spain (Note: Released as Complices: Edición Especial de Navidad. Includes 2 CD's: Navidades and Cómplices)	2 December 2008	2 CD's	Limited	Warner Music Latina
Chile	2011	CD	Standard	Warner Music Latina

== See also ==
- 2006 in Latin music
- List of number-one albums of 2006 (Mexico)
- List of number-one Billboard Top Latin Albums of 2006
- List of number-one Billboard Latin Pop Albums from the 2000s
- List of number-one debuts on Billboard Top Latin Albums
