= Cómplices =

2008 studio album by Luis Miguel

Studio album by Luis Miguel
- Released: 2 May 2008
- Studios: Ocean Way Recording; Record Plant; Westlake Recording Studios (Hollywood, CA)
- Genre: Pop
- Length: 51:43
- Language: Spanish
- Label: Warner Music Latina
- Producers: Luis Miguel; Manuel Alejandro

Luis Miguel chronology
Navidades (2006)	Cómplices (2008)	No Culpes a La Noche (2009)

Singles from Complices
- 1. "Si Tú Te Atreves" Released: 7 April 2008; 2. "Te Desean" Released: 30 June 2008

Cómplices (transl. Accomplices) is the 18th studio album by Mexican singer Luis Miguel, released on 2 May 2008 by Warner Music Latina. The record is a collaboration with Spanish musician Manuel Alejandro, who wrote and arranged the songs, and co-produced the album with Luis Miguel. Musically, it is a pop album of mostly ballads and a few uptempo tracks with lyrics emphasizing romance. Two singles were released to promote the album: "Si Tú Te Atreves" and "Te Desean". To further promote the record, Luis Miguel embarked on the year-long Cómplices Tour from September 2008 to September 2009. He performed in North America and a few countries in South America.

Upon its release, Cómplices was met with mixed reactions from music critics. While Luis Miguel's vocals and his decision to work with Alejandro were praised, the record was criticized for sounding too similar to his previous albums. Cómplices was nominated as Best Latin Pop Album at the 51st Annual Grammy Awards (2009) as well as Latin Pop Album of the Year by a Solo Artist at the 2009 Latin Billboard Music Awards. Commercially, Cómplices reached number one in Argentina, Chile, Colombia, Ecuador, Mexico, Peru, Spain, and the Billboard Top Latin Albums chart in the United States. By November 2015, the record had sold over 1.2 million copies.

== Background ==
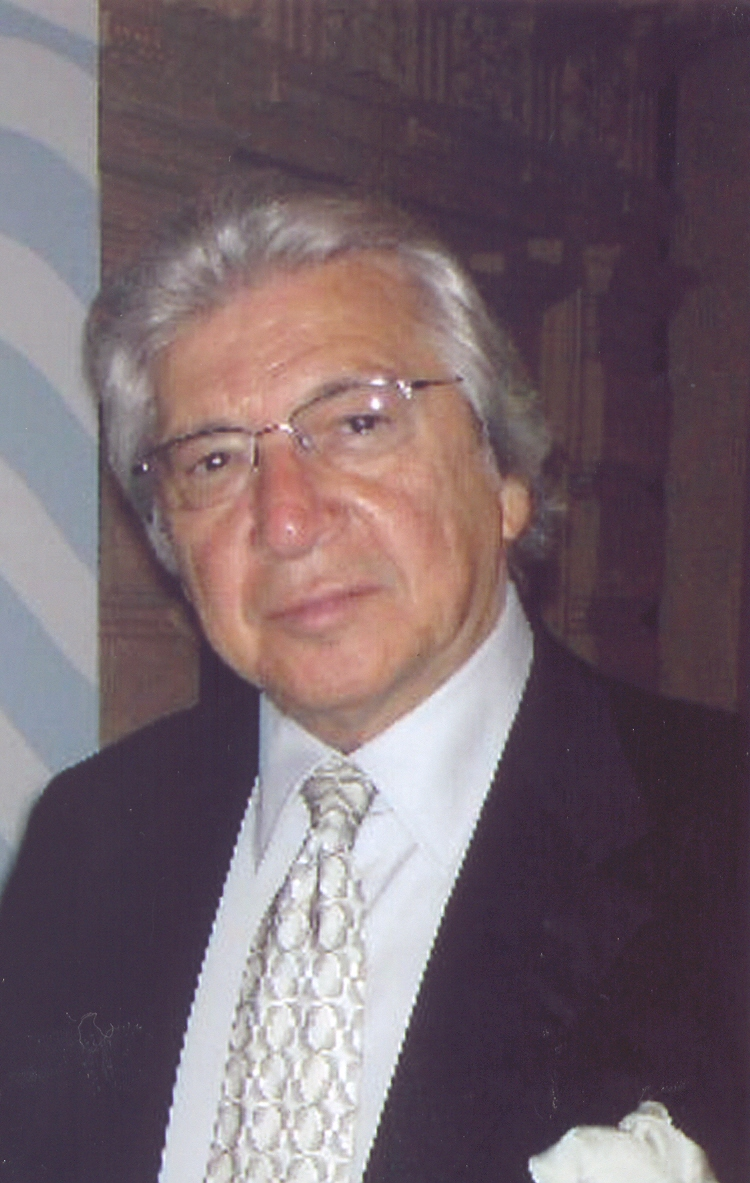
Luis Miguel collaborated with Manuel Alejandro (pictured), who composed, arranged, and co-produced the tracks for Cómplices.

In 2006, Luis Miguel released Navidades, a Christmas album of Christmas standards sung in Spanish. On 17 July the following year, Billboard reported that Luis Miguel was set to release an album of original material on September. Spanish singer and songwriter Rosana mentioned that she wrote songs for Luis Miguel's next project—as they shared the same record label—and she hoped he would accept them.

On 14 March 2008, Luis Miguel announced that he planned to release an album on May of that year featuring original tracks composed by Spanish musician Manuel Alejandro and co-produced by both. The record's title, Cómplices, was announced on 1 April 2008 and was his first pop album of new material since 33 (2003). Alejandro previously composed the tracks "Al Que Me Siga" and "Si Te Perdiera", for Luis Miguel's albums Mis Romances (2001) and Grandes Éxitos (2005), respectively.

The album was mainly recorded at the Record Plant studio in Los Angeles, California, with additional recordings done at Ocean Way Recording and Westlake Recording Studios; the mixing was completed at Record Plant studio as well. Cómplices is the first disc where Luis Miguel allowed someone else to have complete control of the project. Alejandro, a respected composer in the Latin pop field, formerly worked with other artists such as Julio Iglesias, Plácido Domingo, Raphael, and José José. According to Luis Miguel, it took eight or nine years to prepare the disc.

== Composition ==
The ballads on Cómplices are accompanied by an orchestra that included a piano, violins, and cellos. All but three of the songs are ballads with "De Nuevo el Paraíso", "Estrenando Amor", and "Tu Imaginación" being uptempo numbers which incorporate "funky" wind instruments, a female choir, and a "seductive rhythm." Luis Miguel likened the songs on the disc to movies, stating: "Sometimes you are the bad guy, other times the good guy, and some even, the third in discord." The opening track, "Te Desean," is an "envy-drenched" song in which Luis Miguel sings to his beloved that "other men court her and desire her as he did before she was his." It is followed by "Dicen", about a love that is "on the verge of falling apart." In "Ay, Cariño", the artist asks "What are you made of?" and is excited about the cradle and a home. Luis Miguel dedicated the track to his son, who was born before the album's release. On "De Nuevo el Paraíso", his love "fears commitment" while he celebrates the liberty of being alone again. "Si Tú Te Atreves", a half ballad and half bolero song, speaks of "an intense and impossible love" in which the singer proposes a "passionate encounter with a person as tied up or committed as he is." "Amor a Mares" is a Peruvian waltz and the lyrics include: "Te quiero cerca para mi noche fría" / "Te quiero cerca para mi ser vacío" / "Para morir contigo de muerte lenta" / "De darte tanta vida" / "Y amor divino" ("I want you near for my cold night" / I want you near to be my emptiness"/ "To die slowly with you" / "To give you so much life"/ "And divine love").

On "Estrenando Amor," he chants: "Hoy otra vez de nuevo estoy / Estrenando amor / Sueños y caricias / Nuevos besos, nueva vida / Estrenando amor / Amasando amor / Construyendo amor / Divino amor" ("Now I'm new again" / Dreams and caresses" / New kisses, new life" / "Premiering love" / "Kneading love" / "Constructing love"/ "Divine love"). "Bravo Amor, Bravo" is a "filmic analogy of the couple who feigns love and passion" and "fakes kisses." The proceeding track "Tu Imaginación", a disco tune, has the artist enjoying listening to his lover's "diversity, fantasy and ambiguity." The title track deals with "eroticism without measure that surpasses reason." Luis Miguel cites on "Amor de Hecho": "Mejor mil veces amor de hecho; mejor mil veces, que amor deshecho ("Better a thousand times love indeed; Better a thousand times, than undone love"). The final cut on the album, "Se Amaban", is about a love who "steals partners" and chronicles a couple "who adored each other, in whose relationship a stranger intervened, awakening black passions in her heart and sowing weeds in his." The bonus track, "Disfraces", is dedicated to his then-partner Aracely Arámbula. Manuel Alejandro wrote this song while living with Luis Miguel in Acapulco.

== Promotion ==
=== Release ===
Luis Miguel holding a press conference in Mexico City to celebrate the release of Cómplices.

Cómplices was released in Spain on 2 May 2008 and worldwide four days later to coincide with Mother's Day. On 6 May Luis Miguel held a press conference at the Casino Español in Mexico City to celebrate the launch of the album. Three days later he held another press conference in Madrid, Spain to present the album. A two-disc holiday edition of the record was released in Spain on 2 December 2008 and contains both Cómplices and Navidades.

A special edition of the album, Cómplices: Edición Especial was issued on 28 April 2009. It includes a DVD featuring the music videos for "Si Tú Te Atreves" and "Te Desean" as well as a new track "Disfraces", five commemorative postcards, and a digital download for the remix of "Tu Imaginación" by Hex Hector. The special edition was also launched to tie-in with Mother's Day.

=== Singles ===
"Si Tú Te Atreves" was released as the album's lead single on 7 April 2008, and it reached number 11 and four on the Billboard Hot Latin Songs and Latin Pop Airplay charts in the US, respectively. It reached the top of the Chilean music charts according to the Associated Press. The music video for the song was filmed in Los Angeles, California, directed by Rebecca Blake, and released on 27 April 2008. The second single, "Te Desean", was released on 30 June 2008, and also reached number one in Chile and number five in Uruguay. The accompanying music video, also directed by Blake, was filmed in Malibu and released on 14 July 2008.

In addition to the singles, the title track and "Ay, Cariño" peaked at number two and three in Uruguay, respectively, and in Nicaragua at number two. "Amor de Hecho" also received radio airplay in Panama. "Amor a Mares" peak at number one in Chile. "Disfraces" was released in 2009 as a promo single for the special edition of Cómplices.

=== Tour ===
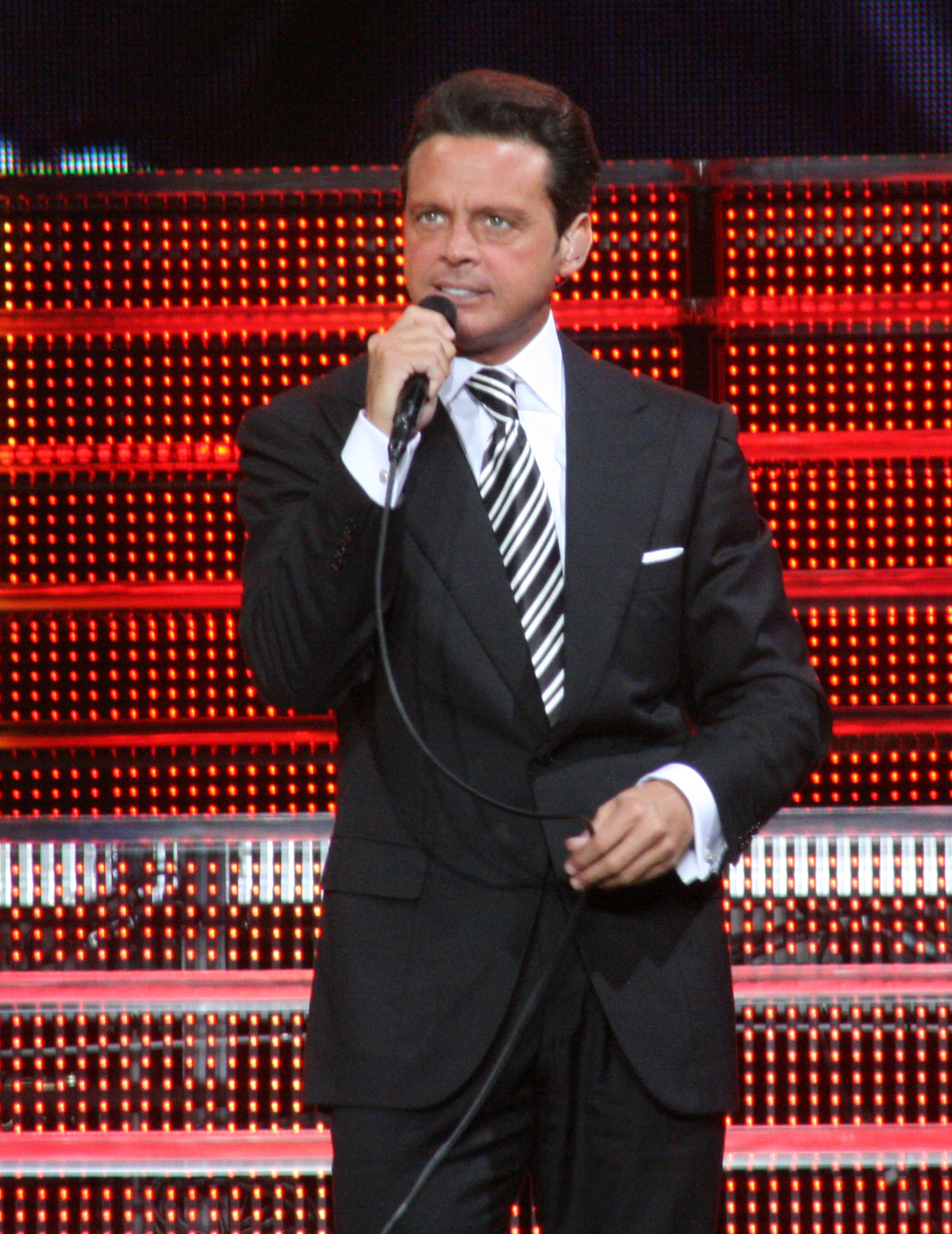
Luis Miguel on stage in Broomfield, Colorado during his Cómplices Tour.

To promote Cómplices, Luis Miguel embarked on a worldwide tour commencing in the United States. The North American leg of the tour cumulated 40 concerts, including a show in Toronto, Canada. Luis Miguel also toured in the Dominican Republic, Puerto Rico and Chile. In Argentina, his four shows in the Vélez Sarsfield Stadium in Buenos Aires sold 200,000 tickets, an additional 100,000 tickets were purchased throughout the country. The first leg of the tour ended 5 December 2008 in Punta del Este, Uruguay, completing 53 concerts in 94 days. The second leg of the tour began in Mexico City's Nacional Auditorium on 20 January 2009. He tried to break his previous record in this venue with 30 concerts in the same tour, achieved with México En La Piel Tour. However, he only completed 25 shows. Luis Miguel continued his Mexican tour with four concerts in the Telmex Auditorium of Guadalajara, and another four concerts in Monterrey's Arena. He completed the last 10 concerts of 25 scheduled in Mexico City between 24 February to 8 March. From 12 to 15 September he played the last four concerts of the tour in The Colosseum at Caesars Palace in Las Vegas. The entire tour consisted of 91 concerts in 42 cities and 8 countries.

Miguel was accompanied by a 12-piece band during his tour which included horns, keyboards, guitars, two female backup singers, and a 11-piece mariachi band. His hour and forty-five minute concert consisted mainly of pop songs and ballads from Cómplices and his earlier career, as well as medleys of boleros and mariachi songs from his past catalog in a couple of medleys. The stage was made up of LED screens displaying abstract images in each song, 3 big screens, one in the middle and one on each side of the stage, also included crystal clear steps and a gleaming floor, surrounded by a display of powerful lights and sound.

Regarding Luis Miguel's performance in Chicago, the Chicago Sun-Times editor Laura Emerick commented that the concert "displayed Luismi in his many musical phases: Latin pop crooner, bolero specialist, pop-rock swinger and mariachi master". She noted that Miguel "was all smiles, all upbeat attitude and genuinely happy to be there", and complimented the five-minute overture and video-clip reel that "Elvis might have admired". Also commented that "Luismi appeared to be at his peak on his ranchera section — where his rich baritone sounds most at home, he even can hold his own with greats of the past". According to Pollstar, the tour grossed 36.1 million and was attended by 450,000 spectators in 73 shows reported. During his concerts in Mexico City he received a special award, a Silver Dahlia for his 180 concerts at the National Auditorium since 1991, gathering 1.5 million spectators in total. In addiction, the tour received a nomination at the 2009 Latin Billboard Music Awards for the Latin Tour of the Year.

== Critical reception and accolades ==
Professional ratings
Review scores
Source	Rating
AllMusic	3.5/5 stars
Montreal Gazette	2.5/5 stars
The Philadelphia Inquirer	3/4 stars
Vida en el Valle	3/5 stars

On its release, Cómplices was met with mixed reactions from music critics. AllMusic editor Andree Farias rated the album 3.5 of 5 stars, calling it his most "hopelessly romantic disc" of the artist's career and "pristinely executed by Latin pop standards. She lauded Luis Miguel's decision to collaborate with Alejandro, questioning why it took long for both artists to work together, and stated that the composer's "eye for detail" is "exquisite." Farias noted that while the record is "poetically" flawless, it "doesn't result in a big sonic departure for the vocalist." Billboard En Español critic Marcela Álvarez wrote a positive review of the album, also praising the collaboration between Luis Miguel and Alejandro. She found "Si Tú Te Atreves" to be the record's best track and concluded that "more than one summer love will be born from this album." A.D. Amorosi of The Philadelphia Inquirer, rating it three of four stars, named Luis Miguel "a Mexican Sinatra of sorts," comparing Alejandro's production as the Spanish version of Nelson Riddle. Amorosi praised Luis Miguel's vocals as a "romantic voice whose caramel-coated tones oozed perfectly through the grandest of strings and the slightest of Latin rhythms." A reviewer for Vista magazine called it the "Hottest CD of the Season" and declared that fans of the singer will not "stop playing it."

In a mixed review of the album, El Nuevo Herald writer Sandra Palacios denoted the production as a result of Luis Miguel's experiences, and called it "retro, just like the 70's." Palacios noted that songs such as "Si Tú Te Atreves" were similar to his previous songs such as "Por Debajo de la Mesa" and "O Tú o Ninguna" and wondered when the singer would release new material that is "fresh and renovative." A reviewer for Montreal Gazette was not impressed with the record. While admiring Luis Miguel's vocals, the writer criticized Cómplices as a "collection of cookie-cutter boring tracks" which would "put one to sleep." Similarly, writing for Vida en el Valle, Olivia Ruiz found the songs to be "monotonous" and felt none of them stood out. She regarded tracks like "De Nuevo al Paraíso" and "Tu Imaginación" giving "little variety to the sounds of the ballads" and surmised the disc is "perfect for a romantic evening." In a negative review of Cómplices, José María Álvarez of Reforma criticized Luis Miguel for being unimaginative and felt the tracks were identical to each other. He unfavorably regarded "Ay, Cariño" as an overtone of fellow Mexican singer Emannuel and found the strings on the record to be "bland."

At the 51st Annual Grammy Awards in 2009, Cómplices received a Grammy nomination for Best Latin Pop Album, which went to La Vida... Es Un Ratico (2007) by Juanes. At the 2009 Latin Billboard Music Awards, it was nominated for Latin Pop Album of the Year by a Solo Artist, but lost to 95/08 Éxitos (2008) by Enrique Iglesias.

== Commercial performance ==
Within 24 hours of it release, Cómplices sold over 320,000 copies and received four platinum certifications. In Mexico, it debuted at the top of the Top 100 Mexico chart and spent six weeks on this spot. Cómplices was certified diamond by AMPROFON in just three weeks after its launch for sales of 400,000 copies and was the second best-selling album of 2008 in the country after Para Siempre (2007) by Vicente Fernández. In the US, Cómplices debuted and peaked at number 10 in the Billboard 200 on the week of 24 May 2008, making it the singer's highest ranking album on the chart, which was previously held by Romances (1997) at number 14. The set bowed at No. 10 with 32,000 copies on its opening week. Leila Cobo noted, however, that it was not the singer's best sales week ever. In addition, the record debuted at number one on the Billboard Top Latin Albums chart, where it spent two weeks on this spot. This made Luis Miguel the artist with the most number ones on the chart, until his record was broken by Marco Antonio Solís in 2013. It sold over 72,000 units in the country and was eventually awarded a platinum certification in the Latin field by the Recording Industry Association of America for shipments of 100,000 units.

In Spain, Cómplices reached number one on its album charts and sold 65,000 copies in 2008, making it the 14th best selling album of the year. Cómplices was certified platinum by PROMUSICAE for shipping over 80,000 copies. In South America, the disc reached number one in Argentina, Chile, Colombia, Ecuador, and Peru. Additionally, it was certified multi-platinum in Argentina and Chile and platinum in Venezuela. As of November 2015, Cómplices had sold over 1.2 million units worldwide.

== Track listing ==
All tracks are written by Manuel Alejandro, except where noted.

No.	Title	Writer(s)	Length
1.	"Te Desean"		4:26
2.	"Dicen"		3:20
3.	"Ay, Cariño"		4:18
4.	"De Nuevo el Paraíso"		4:26
5.	"Si Tú Te Atreves"		3:54
6.	"Amor a Mares"		4:41
7.	"Estrenando Amor"	Alejandro; Pepe Dougan; Víctor Feijóo	3:50
8.	"Bravo Amor Bravo"		5:36
9.	"Tu Imaginación"	Alejandro; Dougan; Feijóo	3:55
10.	"Cómplices"		4:30
11.	"Amor de Hecho"		4:23
12.	"Se Amaban"		4:12
Total length:			51:43

Edición Especial DVD
No.	Title	Video director	Length
1.	"Si Tú Te Atreves"	Rebecca Blake	3:58
2.	"Te Desean"	Blake	4:31
3.	"Disfraces"	N/A	3:23
Total length:			11:52

== Personnel ==
Adapted from the Cómplices liner notes:

=== Performance credits ===
Musicians

- Victor Loyo – drums
- Gerardo Carrillo – bass
- Victor Feijoo – guitar
- Manuel Alejandro – keyboards
- Pepe Dougan – keyboards
- Francisco Loyo – acoustic piano
- Bruce Dukov – violin solo
- Larry Corbett – cello solo
- Wayne Bergeron – trumpet
- Gary Grant – trumpet
- Daniel Higgins – saxophone
- William Reichenbach – trombone
- Tommy Aros – percussion
- Alejandro Carballo – orchestra director

Violin

- Bruce Dukov
- Richard Altenbach
- Charlie Bisharat
- Rebecca Bunnell
- Nicole Bush
- Darius Campo
- Mario DeLeón
- David Ewart
- Armen Garabedian
- Alan Grunfeld
- Tamara Hatwan
- Peter Kent
- Razdan Kuyumjian
- Alyssa Park
- Michelle Richards
- Guillermo Romero
- Mari Tsumura
- Josefina Vergara

Cello

- Larry Corbett
- Jodi Burnett
- Mattehew Cooker
- Trevor Handy
- Paula Hochalter
- Armen Ksajikian
- Dane Little
- Timothy Landauer
- Miguel Martínez
- Steve Richards
- Daniel Smith
- Christina Soule
- Rudolph Stein
- Kevan Torfeh
- Sebastian Tottcher
- John Walz

Chorus

- Juan Del Castillo
- Bambi Jones
- Leyla Hoyle Guerrero
- Carlos Murguia
- Kenny O'Brien
- Giselda Vatcky
- Terry Wood

=== Technical credits ===
- Luis Miguel – producer
- Manuel Alejandro – producer, basic arrangements, arrangements (keyboards, strings, pianos)
- Alejandro Asensi – executive producer
- Francisco Loyo – music co-production
- David Reitzas – mixer
- Rafa Sardina – engineer
- Ron McMaster – mastering engineer
- Victor Feijoo – basic arrangements ("Tú Imaginación" and "Estrenando Amor"), arrangements (programming, chrorus, guitars), brass arrangements
- Pepe Dougan – basic arrangements ("Tú Imaginación" and "Estrenando Amor"), arrangements (programming, chrorus, guitars), brass arrangements
- Jerry Hey – brass arrangements
- Nate Hertwick – recording assistant
- Ryan Kennedy – recording assistant
- Wesley Seidman – recording assistant
- Antonio Resendéz – recording assistant
- Alberto Tolot – photography
- Jeri Heiden – graphic design
- Shari Sutcliffe – production coordinator

=== Recording and mixing locations ===
- Ocean Way Recording Studios, Hollywood, CA – recording
- Record Plant Studios, Hollywood, CA – recording, mixing
- Westlake Recording Studios, Hollywood, CA – recording
- Capitol Mastering, Hollywood, CA – mastering

== Charts ==
=== Weekly charts ===
Weekly chart performance for Cómplices
Chart (2008)	Peak position
Argentina (CAPIF)	1
Chile (IFPI)	1
Colombia (ASINCOL)	1
Ecuador (IFPI)	1
Mexican Albums (Top 100 Mexico)	1
Peru (UNIMPRO)	1
Spanish Albums (Promusicae)	1
US Billboard 200	10
US Top Latin Albums (Billboard)	1
US Latin Pop Albums (Billboard)	1

=== Monthly charts ===
Monthly chart performance for Cómplices
Chart (2008)	Peak position
Argentina (CAPIF)	2

=== Year-end charts ===
2008 year-end chart performance for Cómplices
Chart (2008)	Position
Argentina (CAPIF)	2
Chile (IFPI)	1
Mexico (Top 100 AMPROFON)	2
Spain (PROMUSICAE)	14
US Top Latin Albums (Billboard)	14
US Latin Pop Albums (Billboard)	6

2009 year-end chart performance for Cómplices
Chart (2009)	Position
Mexico (Top 100 AMPROFON)	91

== Certifications and sales ==
Certifications and sales for Complices
Region	Certification	Certified units/sales
Argentina (CAPIF)	3× Platinum	120,000
Chile	2× Platinum	25,000
Mexico (AMPROFON)	Diamond	400,000
Spain (Promusicae)	Platinum	65,000
United States (RIAA)	Platinum (Latin)	72,000
Venezuela	Platinum	17,140
Summaries
Worldwide	—	1,200,000

== Release history ==
Release dates and formats for Cómplices
Region	Date	Format	Edition	Label
Spain	2 May 2008	CD	Standard	Warner Music España
United States	6 May 2008	CD	Standard	Warner Music Latina
Argentina	6 May 2008	CD	Standard	Warner Music Argentina
Mexico	6 May 2008	CD	Standard	Warner Music México
Ecuador	6 May 2008	CD	Standard	Warner Music México
Venezuela	6 May 2008	CD	Standard	Warner Music México
Russia	6 May 2008	CD	Standard	Warner Music México
Spain	2 December 2008	2 CDs	Limited	Warner Music España
Mexico	28 April 2009	CD + DVD	Special	Warner Music México

== See also ==
- 2008 in Latin music
- List of number-one albums of 2008 (Mexico)
- List of number-one Billboard Top Latin Albums of 2008
- List of number-one Billboard Latin Pop Albums from the 2000s
- List of number-one debuts on Billboard Top Latin Albums
