= Si Tú Te Atreves =

Single by Luis Miguel

from the album Complices
- Released: April 7, 2008
- Recorded: 2007
- Genre: Latin pop · Latin ballad
- Length: 3:54
- Label: Warner Bros.
- Songwriter: Manuel Alejandro
- Producers: Luis Miguel, Manuel Alejandro

Luis Miguel singles chronology
"Mi Humilde Oración" / "Santa Claus Llegó a la Ciudad" (2006)	"Si Tú Te Atreves" (2008)	"Te Desean" (2008)

"Si Tú Te Atreves" (English: If You Dare) is a song written and produced by Manuel Alejandro and performed and produced by Luis Miguel. It was released as the first single from the album Complices. It is a romantic ballad about an intense and impossible love.

== Promotion ==
The track was first played on March 30, 2008, in the United States on the show "Reporte Última Palabra" and the next day on "El Show de Piolín", one of the highest-rated radio shows by the Latin community.

== Video information ==
The premiere of the music video was set on April 27, 2008, on the Latin cable channel Sony Entertainment Television at 10:00 pm EST. The video was directed by Rebecca Blake, and the shooting took place in Los Angeles, California in March 2008.

== Chart performance ==
The track debuted in the United States Billboard Hot Latin Tracks chart at number 23 on April 19, 2008., peaking so far at number 12.

== Charts ==
Luis Miguel – "Si Tu Te Atreves"
30 seconds of the first single of the album, Si Tú Te Atreves.

=== Weekly charts ===
Chart (2008)	Peak position
US Hot Latin Songs (Billboard)	11
US Latin Pop Airplay (Billboard)	4

=== Year-end charts ===
Chart (2008)	Position
US Latin Songs (Billboard)	47
US Latin Pop Songs (Billboard)	12

== Certifications ==
Region	Certification	Certified units/sales
Mexico (AMPROFON) Ringtone	Gold	10,000^{*}
^{*} Sales figures based on certification alone.
