= Cómplices Tour =

2008–09 concert tour by Luis Miguel

- World tour by Luis Miguel
- Promotional poster for the 2008 tour
- Associated album: Cómplices
- Start date: September 3, 2008
- End date: September 15, 2009
- Legs: 3
- No. of shows: 79 in North America; 12 in South America; 91 total
- Box office: $36.1 million (73 shows)

Luis Miguel concert chronology
- México En La Piel Tour (2005–07); Cómplices Tour (2008–09); Luis Miguel Tour (2010–12)

Cómplices Tour (transl. Accomplices Tour) was a concert tour by the Mexican singer Luis Miguel to promote his album Cómplices. The tour consisted of 91 concerts and ran through, US, Canada, Dominican Republic, Puerto Rico, Chile, Argentina, Uruguay and Mexico between 2008 and 2009, grossing $36.1 million from 73 shows reported with 450,000 spectators.

== History ==
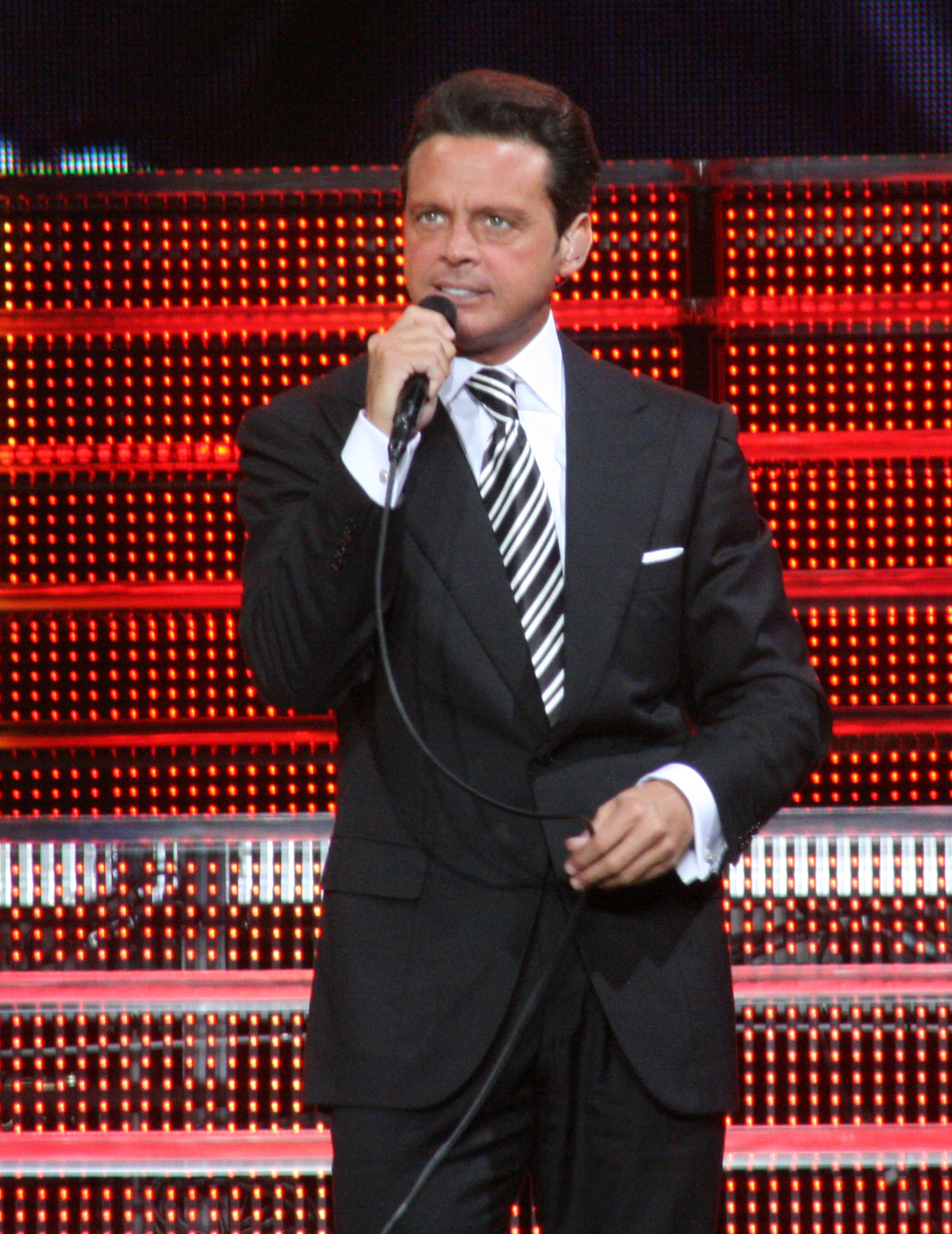
Luis Miguel on stage in Broomfield, Colorado during his Cómplices Tour.

To promote Cómplices, Luis Miguel began his Cómplices Tour on 3 September 2008 in Seattle, Washington. He toured in the United States for two months, in states like California, Colorado, Texas, New York, Florida, among others. Playing a total of 40 concerts, with a show also in Toronto, Canada. To finish the US tour in Orlando, Florida on 9 November. Luis Miguel continued touring in Dominican Republic, Puerto Rico and Chile. In Argentina sold 200,000 tickets for his four shows in the Vélez Sarsfield Stadium in Buenos Aires, and 100,000 more for the rest concerts in the country. The first leg of the tour ended 5 December 2008 in Punta del Este, Uruguay, completing 53 concerts in 94 days.

The second leg of the tour started in the Mexico City's Nacional Auditorium on 20 January 2009. He tried to break his previous record in this venue with 30 concerts in the same tour, achieved with México En La Piel Tour. However, he only completed 25 shows. He continues his Mexican tour with four concerts in the Telmex Auditorium of Guadalajara, and another four concerts in Monterrey's Arena. He completed the last 10 concerts of 25 scheduled in Mexico City between 24 February to 8 March. From 12 to 15 September he played the last four concerts of the tour in The Colosseum at Caesars Palace in Las Vegas. The entire tour consisted of 91 concerts in 42 cities and 8 countries.

Miguel was accompanied by a 12-piece band during his tour which included horns, keyboards, guitars, two female backup singers, and a 11-piece mariachi band. His hour and forty-five minute concert consisted mainly of pop songs and ballads from Cómplices and his earlier career, as well as medleys of boleros and mariachi songs from his past catalog in a couple of medleys. The stage was made up of LED screens displaying abstract images in each song, 3 big screens, one in the middle and one on each side of the stage, also included crystal clear steps and a gleaming floor, surrounded by a display of powerful lights and sound. Miguel changes clothes three times during the show, wearing suits from Armani, Zegna and Hugo Boss. At the end of the show the singer throws to the audience black beach balls and tour T-shirts.

== Critical reception ==
Regarding Luis Miguel's performance in Chicago, the Chicago Sun-Times editor Laura Emerick commented that the concert "displayed Luismi in his many musical phases: Latin pop crooner, bolero specialist, pop-rock swinger and mariachi master". She noted that Miguel "was all smiles, all upbeat attitude and genuinely happy to be there", and complimented the five-minute overture and video-clip reel that "Elvis might have admired". Also commented that "Luismi appeared to be at his peak on his ranchera section — where his rich baritone sounds most at home, he even can hold his own with greats of the past".

According to Pollstar, the tour grossed 36.1 million and was attended by 450,000 spectators in 73 shows reported. During his concerts in Mexico City he received a special award, a Silver Dahlia for his 180 concerts at the National Auditorium since 1991, gathering 1.5 million spectators in total. In addiction, the tour received a nomination at the 2009 Latin Billboard Music Awards for the Latin Tour of the Year.

== Tour set list ==
Cómplices Tour : (37 shows) September/03/2008 – November/12/2008

Cómplices Tour : (37 shows) September/03/2008 – November/12/2008
No.	Title	Original album	Length
1.	"Introduction [Intromix]"
2.	"Tu Imaginación"	Cómplices
3.	"Suave"	Aries
4.	"Tu Y Yo"	Aries
5.	"Si Te Vas"	Nada Es Igual
6.	"Hasta Que Me Olvides"	Aries
7.	"Medley" (No Me Platiques Más / No Sé Tú / El Día Que Me Quieras)	Romance, Segundo Romance
8.	"Medley" (Inolvidable / Bésame Mucho / La Última Noche / Amor, Amor, Amor)	Romance, Romances, Mis Romances
9.	"Interlude"
10.	"Pensar En Tí"	Aries
11.	"Te Necesito"	33
12.	"Amarte Es Un Placer"	Amarte Es Un Placer
13.	"O Tú, O Ninguna"	Amarte Es Un Placer
14.	"Quiero"	Amarte Es Un Placer
15.	"Bravo Amor Bravo"	Cómplices
16.	"Estrenando Amor"	Cómplices
17.	"Te Desean (Only in Sacramento)"	Cómplices
18.	"Si Tú Te Atreves"	Cómplices
19.	"Medley" (Si Nos Dejan / Échame A Mí La Culpa / Sabes Una Cosa)	El Concierto, Mexico En La Piel
20.	"Medley (Only in Las Vegas)" (Mucho Corazón / La Media Vuelta / Amorcito Corazón)	Romance, Segundo Romance, Mis Romances
21.	"Medley" (Que Seas Feliz / Y / De Que Manera Te Olvido / La Bikina / El Viajero)	Mexico En La Piel, Vivo
22.	"Que Nivel De Mujer"	Aries
23.	"Será Que No Me Amas"	20 Años
24.	"Interlude [Melodies]"
25.	"Es Mejor"	Soy Como Quiero Ser
26.	"Tu Imaginación (Reprise)"	Cómplices

Cómplices Tour : (14 shows) November/14/2008 – Dic/5/2008

Cómplices Tour : (12 shows) November/20/2008 – Dic/5/2008
No.	Title	Original album	Length
1.	"Introduction [Intromix]"
2.	"Tu Imaginación"	Cómplices
3.	"Suave"	Aries
4.	"Tu Y Yo"	Aries
5.	"Si Te Vas"	Nada Es Igual
6.	"Hasta Que Me Olvides"	Aries
7.	"Medley" (No Me Platiques Más / No Sé Tú / El Día Que Me Quieras)	Romance, Segundo Romance
8.	"Medley" (Inolvidable / Bésame Mucho / La Última Noche / Amor, Amor, Amor)	Romance, Romances, Mis Romances
9.	"Interlude"
10.	"Pensar En Tí"	Aries
11.	"Te Necesito"	33
12.	"Amarte Es Un Placer"	Amarte Es Un Placer
13.	"O Tú, O Ninguna"	Amarte Es Un Placer
14.	"Quiero"	Amarte Es Un Placer
15.	"Bravo Amor Bravo"	Cómplices
16.	"Estrenando Amor"	Cómplices
17.	"Si Tú Te Atreves"	Cómplices
18.	"Medley" (Decídete / Los Muchachos De Hoy / Ahora Te Puedes Marchar / La Chica Del Bikini Azul / Isabel / Cuando Calienta El Sol)	Decídete, Fiebre De Amor, Soy Como Quiero Ser, Palabra de honor
19.	"Que Nivel De Mujer"	Aries
20.	"Será Que No Me Amas"	20 Años

Cómplices Tour : (33 shows) January/20/2009 – March/8/2009

Cómplices Tour : (33 shows) January/20/2009 – March/8/2009
No.	Title	Original album	Length
1.	"Introduction [Intromix]"
2.	"Tu Imaginación"	Cómplices
3.	"Suave"	Aries
4.	"Tu Y Yo"	Aries
5.	"Speech/Si Te Vas"	Nada Es Igual
6.	"Hasta Que Me Olvides"	Aries
7.	"Medley" (No Me Platiques Más / No Sé Tú / El Día Que Me Quieras)	Romance, Segundo Romance
8.	"Medley" (Inolvidable / Bésame Mucho / La Última Noche / Amor, Amor, Amor)	Romance, Romances, Mis Romances
9.	"Interlude"
10.	"Pensar En Tí"	Aries
11.	"Te Necesito"	33
12.	"Amarte Es Un Placer"	Amarte Es Un Placer
13.	"Medley" (Entrégate / La Incondicional)	20 Años, Busca Una Mujer
14.	"Quiero"	Amarte Es Un Placer
15.	"Bravo Amor Bravo"	Cómplices
16.	"Estrenando Amor"	Cómplices
17.	"Si Tú Te Atreves"	Cómplices
18.	"Medley" (Si Nos Dejan / Échame A Mi La Culpa / Sabes Una Cosa)	El Concierto, Mexico En La Piel
19.	"Medley" (Que Seas Feliz / Y / De Que Manera Te Olvido / La Bikina / El Viajero)	Mexico En La Piel, Vivo
20.	"Que Nivel De Mujer"	Aries
21.	"Será Que No Me Amas"	20 Años
22.	"Interlude [Melodies]"
23.	"Es Mejor"	Soy Como Quiero Ser
24.	"Tu Imaginación (Reprise)"	Cómplices

Cómplices Tour : (4 shows) Sept/12/2009 – Sept/15/2009

Cómplices Tour 2009 : (4 shows) Sept/12/2009 – Sept/15/2009
No.	Title	Original album	Length
1.	"Introduction [Intromix]"
2.	"Vuelve"	33
3.	"Suave"	Aries
4.	"Sol Arena Y Mar"	Amarte Es Un Placer
5.	"O Tu O Ninguna"	Amarte Es Un Placer
6.	"Come Fly With Me"	Duets II
7.	"Si Te Vas"	Nada Es Igual
8.	"Hasta Que Me Olvides"	Aries
9.	"Medley" (Inolvidable / Bésame Mucho / La Última Noche / Amor, Amor, Amor)	Romance, Romances, Mis Romances
10.	"Interlude"
11.	"Devuelveme El Amor"	33
12.	"Te Necesito"	33
13.	"Medley" (Entrégate / La Incondicional)	20 Años, Busca Una Mujer
14.	"Tú Solo Tú"	Amarte Es Un Placer
15.	"El Son De Negra"
16.	"Medley" (Si Nos Dejan / Échame A Mi La Culpa / Sabes Una Cosa)	El Concierto, Mexico En La Piel
17.	"El Rey"	El Concierto
18.	"Entrega Total"	Mexico En La Piel
19.	"Medley" (Que Seas Feliz / Y / De Que Manera Te Olvido / La Bikina / El Viajero)	Mexico En La Piel, Vivo
20.	"Que Nivel De Mujer"	Aries
21.	"Será Que No Me Amas"	20 Años
22.	"Medley" (Como Es Posible Que A Mi Lado/ Te Propongo Esta Noche)	Nada Es Igual, Amarte Es Un Placer

== Tour dates ==
List of concerts, showing date, city, country, venue, tickets sold, number of available tickets and amount of gross revenue
Date	City	Country	Venue	Attendance	Revenue
North America - Leg 1
September 3, 2008	Seattle	United States	WaMu Theater	4,316 / 4,316	$315,560
September 5, 2008	Sacramento	United States	ARCO Arena	5,479 / 11,470	$275,752
September 6, 2008	San Jose	United States	HP Pavilion	6,200 / 11,500	$466,213
September 7, 2008	Stateline	United States	Harveys Outdoor Arena	2,872 / 3,500	$238,653
September 10, 2008	Santa Barbara	United States	Santa Barbara Bowl	2,361 / 4,144	$196,238
September 12, 2008	Las Vegas	United States	The Colosseum at Caesars Palace	16,490 / 16,490	$2,519,422
September 13, 2008	Las Vegas	United States	The Colosseum at Caesars Palace	16,490 / 16,490	$2,519,422
September 14, 2008	Las Vegas	United States	The Colosseum at Caesars Palace	16,490 / 16,490	$2,519,422
September 15, 2008	Las Vegas	United States	The Colosseum at Caesars Palace	16,490 / 16,490	$2,519,422
September 17, 2008	Tucson	United States	AVA Amphitheater	4,348 / 5,108	$312,175
September 19, 2008	Phoenix	United States	Dodge Theatre	4,090 / 4,589	$458,620
September 21, 2008	Chula Vista	United States	Cricket Wireless Amphitheatre	11,045 / 19,391	$808,575
September 24, 2008	Fresno	United States	Save Mart Center	2,853 / 3,607	$207,571
September 26, 2008	Los Angeles	United States	Nokia Theatre	19,153 / 19,153	$2,382,678
September 27, 2008	Los Angeles	United States	Nokia Theatre	19,153 / 19,153	$2,382,678
September 28, 2008	Los Angeles	United States	Nokia Theatre	19,153 / 19,153	$2,382,678
October 2, 2008	Denver	United States	Broomfield Event Center	3,466 / 4,889	$224,924
October 4, 2008	El Paso	United States	El Paso County Coliseum	9,393 / 9,393	$656,395
October 5, 2008	El Paso	United States	El Paso County Coliseum	9,393 / 9,393	$656,395
October 8, 2008	Hidalgo	United States	Dodge Arena	9,111 / 9,111	$854,705
October 9, 2008	Hidalgo	United States	Dodge Arena	9,111 / 9,111	$854,705
October 11, 2008	Laredo	United States	Laredo Entertainment Center	8,532 / 8,963	$511,275
October 12, 2008	Houston	United States	Toyota Center	9,574 / 10,715	$561,840
October 14, 2008	San Antonio	United States	AT&T Center	5,527 / 13,537	$341,326
October 15, 2008	Austin	United States	Frank Erwin Center	4,087 / 4,087	$254,836
October 16, 2008	Grand Prairie	United States	Nokia Theatre	4,742 / 4,742	$439,850
October 18, 2008	Kansas City	United States	Sprint Center	3,456 / 4,042	$282,800
October 19, 2008	Minneapolis	United States	Northrop Auditorium	2,043 / 2,589	$166,240
October 23, 2008	Rosemont	United States	Allstate Arena	6,049 / 7,500	$579,625
October 25, 2008	Uncasville	United States	Mohegan Sun Arena	—N/a	—N/a
October 26, 2008	Fairfax	United States	Patriot Center	2,547 / 5,689	$221,205
October 29, 2008	Brampton	Canada	Powerade Centre	5,057 / 6,000	$527,694
October 31, 2008	New York City	United States	Madison Square Garden	10,474 / 12,940	$971,930
November 1, 2008	Atlantic City	United States	Borgata Event Center	—N/a	—N/a
November 2, 2008	Charlotte	United States	Cricket Arena	—N/a	—N/a
November 6, 2008	Estero	United States	Germain Arena	—N/a	—N/a
November 7, 2008	Miami	United States	American Airlines Arena	14,127 / 19,000	$1,168,024
November 8, 2008	Miami	United States	American Airlines Arena	14,127 / 19,000	$1,168,024
November 9, 2008	Orlando	United States	Amway Arena	—N/a	—N/a
November 12, 2008	Santo Domingo	Dominican Republic	Estadio Olímpico	—N/a	—N/a
November 14, 2008	San Juan	Puerto Rico	San Juan Resort & Casino	500 / 500	$250,000
November 15, 2008	San Juan	Puerto Rico	José Miguel Agrelot Coliseum	10,022 / 11,495	$1,126,115
South America
November 20, 2008	Santiago	Chile	Movistar Arena	—N/a	—N/a
November 21, 2008	Santiago	Chile	Movistar Arena	—N/a	—N/a
November 22, 2008	Santiago	Chile	Movistar Arena	—N/a	—N/a
November 23, 2008	Santiago	Chile	Movistar Arena	—N/a	—N/a
November 25, 2008	Mendoza	Argentina	Estadio Malvinas Argentinas	—N/a	—N/a
November 27, 2008	Buenos Aires	Argentina	José Amalfitani Stadium	—N/a	—N/a
November 28, 2008	Buenos Aires	Argentina	José Amalfitani Stadium	—N/a	—N/a
November 29, 2008 (Note: The November 29 show in Buenos Aires was fully recorded for its transmission in Argentina by Canal 13)	Buenos Aires	Argentina	José Amalfitani Stadium	—N/a	—N/a
November 30, 2008	Buenos Aires	Argentina	José Amalfitani Stadium	—N/a	—N/a
December 2, 2008	Córdoba	Argentina	Estadio Chateau Carrera	—N/a	—N/a
December 3, 2008	Rosario	Argentina	Estadio Rosario Central	—N/a	—N/a
December 5, 2008	Punta del Este	Uruguay	Punta Del Este Resort & Casino	—N/a	—N/a
North America II - Leg 2
January 20, 2009	Mexico City	Mexico	National Auditorium	185,978 / 242,075 (Note: The score data is combined from the shows held at the National Auditorium from Jan. 20–31, Feb. 1–8 and Feb. 24–28, March 1–8, 2009, respectively.)	$11,613,724
January 21, 2009	Mexico City	Mexico	National Auditorium	185,978 / 242,075	$11,613,724
January 23, 2009	Mexico City	Mexico	National Auditorium	185,978 / 242,075	$11,613,724
January 24, 2009	Mexico City	Mexico	National Auditorium	185,978 / 242,075	$11,613,724
January 25, 2009	Mexico City	Mexico	National Auditorium	185,978 / 242,075	$11,613,724
January 27, 2009	Mexico City	Mexico	National Auditorium	185,978 / 242,075	$11,613,724
January 28, 2009	Mexico City	Mexico	National Auditorium	185,978 / 242,075	$11,613,724
January 30, 2009	Mexico City	Mexico	National Auditorium	185,978 / 242,075	$11,613,724
January 31, 2009	Mexico City	Mexico	National Auditorium	185,978 / 242,075	$11,613,724
February 1, 2009	Mexico City	Mexico	National Auditorium	185,978 / 242,075	$11,613,724
February 3, 2009	Mexico City	Mexico	National Auditorium	185,978 / 242,075	$11,613,724
February 4, 2009	Mexico City	Mexico	National Auditorium	185,978 / 242,075	$11,613,724
February 6, 2009	Mexico City	Mexico	National Auditorium	185,978 / 242,075	$11,613,724
February 7, 2009	Mexico City	Mexico	National Auditorium	185,978 / 242,075	$11,613,724
February 8, 2009	Mexico City	Mexico	National Auditorium	185,978 / 242,075	$11,613,724
February 12, 2009	Guadalajara	Mexico	Telmex Auditorium	24,502 / 34,508	$2,404,920
February 13, 2009	Guadalajara	Mexico	Telmex Auditorium	24,502 / 34,508	$2,404,920
February 14, 2009	Guadalajara	Mexico	Telmex Auditorium	24,502 / 34,508	$2,404,920
February 15, 2009	Guadalajara	Mexico	Telmex Auditorium	24,502 / 34,508	$2,404,920
February 19, 2009	Monterrey	Mexico	Arena Monterrey	38,382 / 40,092	$2,638,955
February 20, 2009	Monterrey	Mexico	Arena Monterrey	38,382 / 40,092	$2,638,955
February 21, 2009	Monterrey	Mexico	Arena Monterrey	38,382 / 40,092	$2,638,955
February 22, 2009	Monterrey	Mexico	Arena Monterrey	38,382 / 40,092	$2,638,955
February 24, 2009	Mexico City	Mexico	National Auditorium	—	—
February 25, 2009	Mexico City	Mexico	National Auditorium	—	—
February 27, 2009	Mexico City	Mexico	National Auditorium	—	—
February 28, 2009	Mexico City	Mexico	National Auditorium	—	—
March 1, 2009	Mexico City	Mexico	National Auditorium	—	—
March 3, 2009	Mexico City	Mexico	National Auditorium	—	—
March 4, 2009	Mexico City	Mexico	National Auditorium	—	—
March 6, 2009	Mexico City	Mexico	National Auditorium	—	—
March 7, 2009	Mexico City	Mexico	National Auditorium	—	—
March 8, 2009	Mexico City	Mexico	National Auditorium	—	—
North America III - Leg 3
September 12, 2009	Las Vegas	United States	The Colosseum at Caesars Palace	13,638 / 16,497	$2,166,736
September 13, 2009	Las Vegas	United States	The Colosseum at Caesars Palace	13,638 / 16,497	$2,166,736
September 14, 2009	Las Vegas	United States	The Colosseum at Caesars Palace	13,638 / 16,497	$2,166,736
September 15, 2009	Las Vegas	United States	The Colosseum at Caesars Palace	13,638 / 16,497	$2,166,736
Total				450,414 / 571,632 (78,8%)	$36,144,576

== Cancelled shows ==
List of cancelled concerts, showing date, city, country, venue, and reason for cancellation
Date	City	Country	Venue	Reason
September 20, 2008	Indian Wells	United States	Indian Wells Tennis Garden	Unknown

== Band ==
- Vocals: Luis Miguel
- Acoustic & Electric guitar: Todd Robinson
- Bass: Lalo Carrillo
- Piano & Keyboards: Francisco Loyo
- Keyboards & Programming: Salo Loyo
- Drums: Victor Loyo
- Percussion: Tommy Aros
- Saxophone: Jeff Nathanson
- Trumpet: Francisco Abonce
- Trumpet: Ramón Flores
- Trombone: Alejandro Carballo
- Backing vocals: Maria Entraigues (2008–2009), Kacee Clanton (2008–2009), Vie le (2009)
