= Vida en el Valle =

American Spanish-English language newspaper

- Type: Weekly newspaper
- Format: Broadsheet
- Owner: McClatchy
- Publisher: Tom Cullinan
- Editor: Juan Esparza Loera
- Founded: 1990
- Language: Spanish, English
- Headquarters: 1626 E Street Fresno, California 93706, United States
- Circulation: 122,000 copies
- OCLC number: 34617019
- Website: vidaenelvalle.com

Vida en el Valle is a free, bilingual (English/Spanish) newspaper covering ethnic society and culture. The newspaper was first published on August 15, 1990 and is published as part of The Fresno Bee, in Fresno, California. The paper is published weekly on Wednesdays with separate editions in five cities: Fresno, Merced, Modesto, and Stockton. The paper had expanded its circulation to Sacramento in 2006, but closed that operation in 2017. The paper's circulation is 122,000 copies.

The paper is owned and published by the McClatchy Company. Vida en el Valle's website is presented in both English and Spanish.

== History ==
The newspaper began publishing as part of the Fresno Bee in 1990, with an initial circulation of 19,000. Their initial objective was to produce a paper in both English and Spanish, to help reach readers whose first or primary language was Spanish. They also focused on topics of interest to Latino communities in and around Fresno, beyond specialized topics like immigration, such as community events, local issues, and advertisements for local businesses. Juan Esparza Loera has been editor of the paper since its founding.

In 2008, Vida en el Valle's publisher, McClatchy created a partnership with ImpreMedia to share Spanish-language content.

In 2011, Vida en el Valle joined the newly-formed Hispanic National Preprint Network (Hispanic NPN), a network aimed at increasing and strengthening market coverage for member papers. Also in 2011, McClatchy created a partnership to make CIPS Marketing the exclusive distributor of Vida en el Valle, as part of a TMC conversation program.

== Awards ==
=== National Association of Hispanic Publications Jose Marti Awards ===
Year	Award	Place	Recipient
2017	Outstanding Bilingual Language Weekly Newspaper	Gold	Vida en el Valle
	Outstanding Hispanic Success Story (circ >30,000)	Bronze	Vida en el Valle
	Outstanding Immigration Article (circ >30,000)	Bronze	Vida en el Valle
	Outstanding Editorial Column - English	Gold	Vida en el Valle
	Outstanding Editorial Column - English	Bronze	Juan Esparza Loera
	Outstanding National Political Article (circ >30,000)	Silver	Cynthia Moreno
	Outstanding Education Article (circ >30,000)	Bronze	Juan Esparza Loera
	Outstanding Cultural Article (circ >30,000)	Silver	Vida en el Valle
	Outstanding Entertainment Article	Gold	Olivia Barragán Ruiz
	Outstanding News Event Photo	Silver	Juan Esparza Loera
	Outstanding Cultural Photo Essay	Bronze	Juan Esparza Loera
2016	Outstanding National Political Article (circ >30,000)	Gold	Cynthia Moreno
	Outstanding Website Design	Gold	Vida en el Valle
2015	Outstanding Color Photo Overall (circ >30,000)	Bronze	Daniel Sasarez
2014	Outstanding Multiple Article Series	Bronze	Cynthia Moreno, Oliva Ruiz, Maria G Ortiz-Briones, Juan Esparza
	Outstanding Community Service/Health Article (circ>30,000)	Bronze	Maria G Ortiz-Briones
	Outstanding Cultural Article (circ >30,000)	Gold	Maria G Ortiz-Briones
	Outstanding Editorial Column - English	Bronze	Juan Esparza Loera
	Outstanding Bilingual Language Weekly Newspaper	Bronze	Vida en el Valle
2006	Outstanding Sports Photo	Silver	Daniel Calif.sarez
	Outstanding Education Article	Bronze	Luz Pena

=== California News Publishers Association Better Newspaper Contest ===
Year	Award	Place	Recipient
2017	Video Journalism	Finalist	Maria Ortiz-Briones
2016	Artistic Photo	2nd	Hector Navejas
1999	General Excellence	2nd	Vida en el Valle

=== McClatchy President’s Awards ===
Year	Award	Place	Recipient
2012	Special Projects Category	1st	Vida en el Valle
	Sports Category	1st	Vida en el Valle
