= El Alma al Aire =

2000 album by Alejandro Sanz

Studio album by Alejandro Sanz
- Released: 25 September 2000
- Studios: The Hit Factory (Miami, Florida)
- Genre: Pop
- Length: 54:47
- Language: Spanish
- Label: Warner Music Spain
- Producer: Emanuele Ruffinengo

Alejandro Sanz chronology
Discografía Completa: Edición Especial Gira 98 (1998)	El Alma al Aire (2000)	Lo Esencial de... Alejandro Sanz (2001)

Singles from El Alma al Aire
- 1. "Cuando Nadie Me Ve" Released: 18 August 2000; 2. "Quisiera Ser" Released: 5 December 2000; 3. "El Alma al Aire" Released: 2001

El Alma al Aire (transl. The Bared Soul) is the sixth studio album by Spanish singer-songwriter Alejandro Sanz. It was released on 25 September 2000 by Warner Music Spain, following the success of Más (1997) and his hiatus from the music scene in 1999. El Alma al Aire is a pop album, which in comparison to its predecessor, leans more towards ballads. The album was produced by Sanz's frequent collaborator Emanuele Ruffinengo, while other musicians, including Vicente Amigo, returned to collaborate with him following Más.

Following its release, El Alma al Aire was met with generally positive reviews from music critics for its compositions and musical styles, although a few reviewers felt it did not exceed its predecessor's quality. The album received several accolades, including the Latin Grammy Awards for Album of the Year and Best Male Pop Vocal Album, and a Grammy nomination for Best Latin Pop Album in 2001. Commercially, it topped the Spanish albums chart, where it was the best-selling album of 2000 and was certified 13× platinum for shipping over 1.3 million copies. In Latin America, the album reached numbers one and three in Argentina and Mexico, respectively. In the United States, it peaked at number three on the Billboard Top Latin Albums chart and was certified double platinum in the Latin field.

Three singles were released from El Alma al Aire: "Cuando Nadie Me Ve", "Quisiera Ser", and the title track, with music videos accompanying all three. A special edition of the record was released on 11 June 2001 with five additional songs including two duets with the Corrs and Armando Manzanero, respectively. To further promote the album, Sanz embarked on El Alma al Aire Tour in 2001, which spanned Latin America, Spain, and the US.

== Background and recording ==
In 1997, Alejandro Sanz released his fifth studio album, Más. It sold over six million copies internationally and became the best-selling record of all-time in Spain. In 1999, Sanz announced he was taking a hiatus from the music scene for a year to focus on his private life. On 7 January 2000, Spanish newspaper ABC reported that Sanz was set to record a new album that would be released sometime in the year. Four months later, Sanz moved to Miami and began working on his next project. Recording took place at the Hit Factory in Miami, with Emanuele Ruffinengo in charge of the album's production; he had produced Sanz's previous two studio albums.

On 7 July 2000, Sanz announced the album's title, El Alma al Aire, and revealed that it would feature ten original songs. About the making of the album, he explained, "whenever I make an album I am very afraid, but in this case I felt very comfortable. I reconciled myself a little with my defects and found a path that makes me feel very safe". Separate studios were arranged for different sections, including brass, strings, percussion, and background vocals. Several musicians involved in the recording had worked with Sanz on Más, including Vicente Amigo (Spanish guitar), Alfredo Paixao (bass), Lulo Perez (brass), Ludovico Vagnone (guitar), and Luca Jurman (background vocals), while José Miguel Carmona from the band Ketama collaborated on the record as well. Recording and post-production for the album took a total of eight months.

== Composition ==
El Alma al Aire is a pop album that consists of ten tracks, all composed by Sanz. According to Daniel Shumski of the Chicago Sun-Times, the record features ballads and "flamenco-tinged" uptempo numbers. In comparison to his previous album, which mixed pop and flamenco, El Alma al Aire leans more towards ballads; Spanish radio station Los 40 editor Selena Moral stated that El Alma al Aire "followed the style marked by previous works, although betting on a more modern sound and the fusion of genres", while a writer for Diario Mendoza described it as an experiment in fusion of pop, rock, and flamenco. Billboard magazine editor Leila Cobo described the songs as "harmonically and melodically complex, with multiple sonic and stylistic layerings and meandering melodic lines". The opening track, "Cuando Nadie Me Ve", is a ballad that explores themes of solitude, portraying pain as a form of punishment. On "Hay un Universo de Pequeñas Cosas", Sanz encourages listeners to contemplate the subtleties of everyday life. "Quisiera Ser" is a Latin-influenced song about a declaration of love.

Other ballads in the album include "Para Que Me Quieras", "Llega, Llegó Soledad", and "Silencio". Another ballad, "Me Iré", was described as "nostalgic" by El Diario La Prensa editor Ricardo Leon Pena-Villa. On "Para Que Me Quieras", Sanz reflects on fleeting moments of affection bestowed upon him. "Llega, Llegó Soledad" is dedicated to Buenos Aires, Argentina, and contains influences of swing music. "Hicimos un Trato" is a bolero, while "Tiene Que Ser Pecado" is a flamenco rap tune. The closing track, "Silencio", is a reflection on "those who talk a lot and say nothing", according to an editor from El Mundo. "Silencio" also includes a hidden track, "Desde Mis Centros", which was written by Ruffinengo.

== Release and promotion ==
El Alma al Aire was released in Latin America and Spain on 25 September 2000 by Warner Music Spain, and a day later in the US. A special edition of the album was launched on 11 June 2001 in Spain and Portugal, and features an additional disc with five tracks: two versions of "Me Iré" ("The Hardest Day") with the Irish band the Corrs in English and bilingual, a Spanish-language version of the Corrs' song "One Night" ("Una Noche") also performed with the band, "Adoro" with Armando Manzanero, and a remix of "Tiene Que Ser Pecado". "The Hardest Day" marks the first song that Sanz recorded in English, while the three collaborations with the Corrs were produced by David Foster. "Una Noche" was previously included in the Latin American edition of the Corrs' In Blue (2000), while the duet version of "Adoro" was first recorded for Manzanero's studio album Duetos (2000).

=== Tour ===
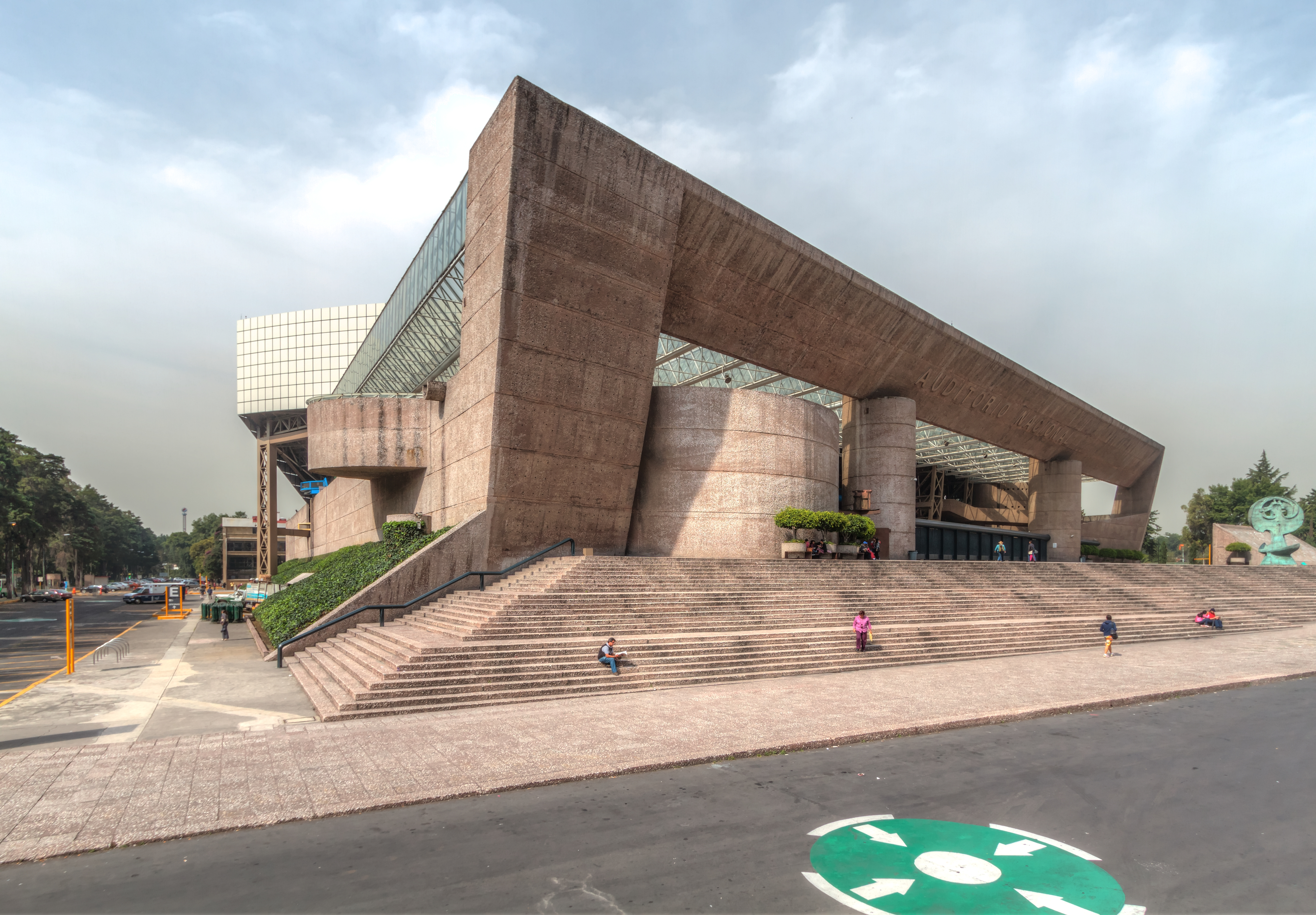
The album's tour included nine shows at the National Auditorium in Mexico City.

To promote El Alma al Aire, Sanz began his El Alma al Aire Tour on 17 February 2001 in Caracas, Venezuela. Sanz toured throughout Latin America, Spain, and the US. The tour concluded on 22 September 2001 in Tenerife, Spain. His nine concerts at the National Auditorium in Mexico City grossed over $2.8 million, the highest-grossing concerts of March, according to Billboard. The set list consisted of songs from El Alma al Aire and his previous albums. In March 2002, Warner Music released the El Alma al Aire en Directo live album on VHS and DVD, which was filmed during a 28 June 2001 show at the Vicente Calderón Stadium in Madrid, Spain.

=== Singles ===
"Cuando Nadie Me Ve" was released as the lead single from El Alma al Aire on 18 August 2000. It peaked at number three in Ecuador; number four in El Salvador, Nicaragua, Panama, and Uruguay; number eight in Guatemala; and number twelve on the Billboard Hot Latin Songs chart in the US. The music video for "Cuando Nadie Me Ve", directed by Sebastien Grousset, was released on 14 September 2000. In the video, which was filmed throughout Madrid, Spain, Sanz is seen kissing and fighting with various women in a boxing ring in several scenes. The visual received a Latin Grammy nomination for Best Short Form Music Video in 2001. "Quisiera Ser" was released as the album's second single on 5 December 2000; it peaked at number nine in Chile, number four in Spain, and number seventeen on the Hot Latin Songs chart in the US. Alejandro Toledo directed the music video for "Quisiera Ser", which was also filmed in Madrid. The music video features Spanish models Esther Cañadas and Elia Galera and Colombian model Martha Lucía Pereiro in a jealousy triangle with Sanz. It ends with Sanz being poisoned at a costume party. According to Toledo, he was inspired by "Sleeping Beauty" while adapting to the song's message.

The title track was released as the third single in 2001 and reached number 40 on the Hot Latin Songs chart in the US. Its music video, also directed by Toledo and filmed in Madrid, narrates an immortal man played by Sanz who, throughout different time periods, falls in love with taken women. Several Spanish celebrities appear in the video, including singer Miguel Bosé, filmmaker Santiago Segura, and actors José Coronado and Gabino Diego. In addition to the three singles, "Hay un Universo de Pequeñas Cosas" was released as a promotional single for the album in 2001, as was "Me Iré (The Hardest Day)" for the special edition of the record. A music video was released for the latter, filmed in the Iberian Peninsula. A music video was also made for "Llega, Llegó Soledad".

=== Re-releases ===
El Alma al Aire was re-released in 2007 with demos of "Cuando Nadie Me Ve" and "El Alma al Aire", as well as a DVD with the music videos for "Cuando Nadie Me Ve", "Quisiera Ser", "El Alma al Aire", "Llega, Llegó Soledad", "Una Noche", and "The Hardest Day", and live performances of several of Sanz's songs from the album at the concert at the Vicente Calderón Stadium in 2001 during his El Alma al Aire Tour (2001). A 20th anniversary edition of El Alma al Aire was released in 2020.

== Critical reception ==
Professional ratings
Review scores
Source	Rating
AllMusic	3/5 stars
Chicago Sun-Times	3/4 stars
Lafonoteca	3/5 stars
El Norte	6/10
La Prensa	3/5 stars
Los Angeles Times	2.5/4 stars

The Chicago Tribune critic Achy Obejas stated all the songs in the album are "a Sanz composition: romantic, but realistic, lyrically lush but in fresh and unexpected ways, serious but surprisingly sincere". She commended "Quisiera Ser" as an "addictive hit single". Rating it three out of four stars for the Chicago Sun-Times, Shumski praised the "clever turns of phrase and cut-above-standard lyrics" as well as Sanz's vocals and tunes. The Santa Fe New Mexican writer Ricardo Cores lauded El Alma al Aire for offering "some of the most beautiful songs of his career", citing works such as "Cuando Nadie Me Ve" and the title track for its poetry and music. El Nuevo Herald reviewer Eliseo Cardona wrote: "From the beginning, from the first note that catches your ear, El Alma al Aire reveals its immense magnetism" with its "[l]ustful sound massages, metaphors that turn the imagination right and wrong".

However, a few critics felt that the album did not exceed the quality of Más. AllMusic editor Stacia Proefrock gave the record three out of five stars, opining that "[w]hile not as strong as his best albums like Más, El Alma al Aire does present a solid collection of ballads" and praised its string sections. In a review for the Los Angeles Times, Ernest Lechner rated the disc two-and-a-half out of four stars, citing Sanz's talent to make "crisp, manipulatively romantic music" but criticized the album's "fussy production values". El Norte critic Deborah Davis was left underwhelmed with the album. She felt its compositions could "please" although fail "to inspire an October night", but praised the choruses on both "Quisiera Ser" and the title track. La Prensa editor Eva Aguilar wrote that the album has "merits" such as "Quisiera Ser", "Para Que Me Quieras", and "Me Iré", but concluded that it does not surpass his previous work. In a retrospective review of El Alma al Aire, a writer for Lafonoteca opined that El Alma al Aire "doesn't quite reach the creative heights of Más. The writer cited the title track as the best song, while calling "Me Iré" and "Tiene Que Ser Pecado" as some of the album's "bold moments", but criticized the usage of the ghost track and concluded it "fits perfectly with the concept of El Alma Al Aire—which is essentially a sigh."

=== Accolades ===
At the 2000 Premios Ondas in Spain, Sanz was awarded Best Artist and Best Album for El Alma al Aire. Seven days later at the Premios Amigo, also in Spain, El Alma al Aire won Best Album while Sanz won Best Male Artist. At the 43rd Annual Grammy Awards in 2001, the record was nominated in the category of Best Latin Pop Album, but lost to MTV Unplugged (2000) by Shakira.

At the 2nd Annual Latin Grammy Awards, also in 2001, Sanz was the biggest winner of the night with four awards, including Album of the Year and Best Male Pop Vocal Album, as well as Record of the Year and Song of the Year for the title track. Sanz also won Latin Album of the Year and Male Latin Artist of the Year for the record at the 2001 Premios Gardel.

== Commercial performance ==
Within a week of its release, El Alma al Aire sold over one million copies, a feat Sanz's record label proclaimed had broken "all sales records in the Spanish record market". The album achieved its greatest success in Sanz's native Spain, where it debuted atop the Productores de Música de España (PROMUSICAE) album chart on 23 September 2000. It was certified 13× platinum by PROMUSICAE for shipping over 1.3 million copies, making it the best-selling album of 2000 in the country and, as of 2026, Spain's second best-selling album overall, surpassed only by Más. In Europe, the International Federation of the Phonographic Industry (IFPI) awarded the album a platinum certification for reported sales of over one million copies across the continent. It also peaked at number 5 in Portugal and number 71 in Switzerland.

The record achieved substantial commercial success across Latin America, ultimately selling over 900,000 units in the region by the end of 2000. In Mexico, it peaked at number three, was certified 5× gold, and had sold over 450,000 units within a month of its release. The album topped Argentina's national charts and was certified triple platinum. It was also certified double platinum in Chile, and platinum in Colombia and Venezuela. In the United States, El Alma al Aire debuted and peaked at number 3 on the Billboard Top Latin Albums chart, and number 148 on the Billboard 200. It was certified double platinum in the Latin field by the Recording Industry Association of America (RIAA) for shipping over 200,000 copies. Nielsen SoundScan reported the record sold over 125,000 units in the US as of August 2003. By June 2001, El Alma al Aire had sold over 2.4 million copies worldwide.

== Track listing ==
All tracks are written by Alejandro Sanz, except where noted.

Standard edition
No.	Title	Writer(s)	Length
1.	"Cuando Nadie Me Ve" ("When Nobody Sees Me")		5:07
2.	"Hay un Universo de Pequeñas Cosas" ("There is a Universe of Small Things")		5:22
3.	"Quisiera Ser" ("I Would Like to Be")		5:30
4.	"Para Que Me Quieras" ("So That You Will Love Me")		4:29
5.	"Llega, Llegó Soledad" ("It's Here, Loneliness Has Arrived")		4:37
6.	"El Alma al Aire" ("The Bared Soul")		5:58
7.	"Me Iré" ("I Will Leave")		5:40
8.	"Hicimos un Trato" ("We Made a Deal")		4:37
9.	"Tiene Que Ser Pecado" ("It Has to Be a Sin")		5:05
10.	"Silencio" ("Silence"; with hidden track "Desde Mis Centros" ("From My Centers"))	Emanuele Ruffinengo ("Desde Mis Centros")	8:22
Total length:			54:47

Edición Especial Disc 2
No.	Title	Writer(s)	Length
1.	"Me Iré (The Hardest Day)" (with the Corrs)		5:07
2.	"Una Noche" (with the Corrs, Spanish version of "One Night")	The Corrs; Sanz	5:22
3.	"Adoro" (with Armando Manzanero)	Manzanero	5:30
4.	"Tiene Que Ser Pecado" (Alternative mix)		4:29
5.	"The Hardest Day" (with the Corrs)		5:07
Total length:			24:36

2007 re-release
No.	Title	Writer(s)	Length
11.	"Cuando Nadie Me Ve" (demo)		4:57
12.	"El Alma al Aire" (demo)		5:39
13.	"Una Noche" (with the Corrs)	The Corrs; Sanz
Total length:			01:09:38

2007 DVD
No.	Title	Length
1.	"Cuando Nadie Me Ve"
2.	"Quisiera Ser"
3.	"El Alma al Aire"
4.	"Llega, Llegó Soledad"
5.	"Una Noche" (with the Corrs)
6.	"The Hardest Day" (with the Corrs)
7.	"Tiene Que Ser Pecado" (live)
8.	"Llega, Llegó Soledad" (live)
9.	"Cuando Nadie Me Ve" (live)
10.	"Me Iré" (live)
11.	"Hay un Universo de Pequeñas Cosas" (live)
12.	"El Alma Al Aire" (live)
13.	"Quisiera Ser" (live)

El Alma Al Aire: 20 Aniversario
No.	Title	Writer(s)	Length
11.	"El Alma al Aire" (demo)		5:39
12.	"Cuando Nadie Me Ve" (demo)		5:00
13.	"Hicimos un Trato" (demo)		5:16
14.	"Me Iré" (demo)		5:22
15.	"Quisiera Ser" (demo)		6:18
16.	"Para Que Me Quieras" (demo)		5:24
17.	"Silencio" (demo)		6:22
18.	"Adoro" (with Armando Manzanero)	Manzanero	4:22
19.	"Dale al Aire" (with Juan Habichuela and Ketama)		3:46
20.	"Quiero Estar Solo" (with Jeros and Los Chichos)		5:05
21.	"Me Vestí de Silencio" (with Moncho)		3:58
22.	"Cai" (with Niña Pastori)		5:12
23.	"Me Iré (The Hardest Day)" (with the Corrs)		4:26
24.	"Una Noche" (with the Corrs)		8:12
25.	"El Alma al Aire" (Extended Remix)		7:14
Total length:			02:16:00

== Personnel ==
Credits were adapted from AllMusic and the liner notes of El Alma al Aire.

- Vicente Amigo – Spanish guitar on "Quisiera Ser" and "El Alma al Aire"
- Gennady Aronin – violin
- Enrique Badulescu – photography
- Antonio Baglio – mastering
- Tim Barnes – viola
- Maurizio Biancani – mixing
- Renato Cantele – engineer, mixing
- Huifang Chen – violin
- Janet Clippard – bass
- Gustavo Correa – violin
- Montse Cortés – background vocals on "Quisiera Ser" and "El Alma al Aire"
- John DiPuccio – violin
- Paquito Echevarría – piano tumbao on "El Alma al Aire"
- Joan Faigen – violin
- Scott Flavin – violin
- Chris Glansdorp – cello
- Alfredo Golino – drums
- Jorge González – assistant engineer
- Luca Jurman – arranger, background vocals
- Mei Mei Luo – violin
- Roberto Maccagno – engineer, technical coordinator
- Charo Manzano – background vocals on "Quisiera Ser" and "El Alma al Aire"
- Raul Midón – background vocals
- José Antonio Molina – arranger, orchestra director
- Susan Moyer – cello
- Alfredo Oliva – violin
- Alfredo Paixao – bass, background vocals
- Wendy Pedersen – background vocals
- Lulo Pérez – arranger, trumpet
- Dave Poler – assistant engineer
- Rita Quintero – background vocals
- Keith Robinson – cello
- Emanuele Ruffinengo – arranger, concept, record producer
- Alejandro Sanz – vocals, background vocals, arranger, concept
- Rafa Sañudo – art direction, design
- Debra Spring – viola
- Ramiro Terán – background vocals
- Christine Tramontano – assistant engineer
- Ludovico Vagnone – acoustic guitar, electric guitar
- Bruce Wethey – violin
- Bogumila Zgraja – violin

== Charts ==
=== Weekly charts ===
Weekly chart performance
Chart (2000)	Peak position
Argentine Albums (CAPIF)	1
European Albums (Music & Media)	36
Mexican Albums (AMPROFON)	3
Portuguese Albums (AFP)	5
Spanish Albums (PROMUSICAE)	1
Swiss Albums (Schweizer Hitparade)	71
US Billboard 200	148
US Heatseekers Albums (Billboard)	5
US Top Latin Albums (Billboard)	3
US Latin Pop Albums (Billboard)	2

=== Year-end charts ===
2000 year-end chart performance
Chart (2000)	Position
Spanish Albums (PROMUSICAE)	1

2001 year-end chart performance
Chart (2001)	Position
Spanish Albums (PROMUSICAE)	8
US Top Latin Albums (Billboard)	41
US Latin Pop Albums (Billboard)	19

== Certifications ==
Certifications and sales
Region	Certification	Certified units/sales
Argentina (CAPIF)	3× Platinum	180,000^{^}
Chile	2× Platinum	50,000
Colombia	Platinum	
Mexico (AMPROFON)	5× Gold	450,000
Spain (Promusicae)	13× Platinum	1,300,000^{^}
United States (RIAA)	2× Platinum (Latin)	125,000
Venezuela	Platinum	
Summaries
Europe (IFPI)	Platinum	1,000,000^{*}
Latin America	—	900,000
Worldwide	—	2,400,000
^{*} Sales figures based on certification alone.^{^} Shipments figures based on certification alone.

== Release history ==
Release dates and formats
Region	Date	Format	Edition	Label	Ref(s).
Spain	25 September 2000	CD	Standard	Warner Music Spain	
Latin America	25 September 2000	CD	Standard	Warner Music Spain	
United States	26 September 2000	CD	Standard	WEA Latina	
Spain	11 June 2001	2 CDs	Special edition	Warner Music Spain	
Portugal	11 June 2001	2 CDs	Special edition	Warner Music Spain	
United States	27 March 2007	CD + DVD	Re-release	Warner Music Latina	
United States	4 December 2020	CD	20th anniversary	Warner Music Latina	

== See also ==
- 2000 in Latin music
- List of best-selling albums in Spain
- List of best-selling Latin albums
- List of fastest-selling albums
- List of number-one albums of 2000 (Spain)
