= Belzberg =

Belzberg may refer to:

== Places ==
- Belzberg (hill), a hill in the Buocher Höhe in Germany

== People ==
- Edet Belzberg, documentary filmmaker
- Jenny Belzberg (born 1928), Canadian philanthropist
- Leslie Belzberg (born 1953), American film- and TV producer
- Morris Belzberg (born 1929), Canadian-born businessman
- Samuel Belzberg (1928–2018), Canadian business man and philanthropist
- Hagy Belzberg (born 1964), American architect

== Companies ==
- Belzberg Architects, an architecture and interior design firm
