= 2nd Annual Latin Grammy Awards =

Music awards presented Oct 2001

2nd Latin Grammy Awards
- Official poster with original date window
- Date: September 11, 2001 (originally planned telecast); October 30, 2001 (press conference)
- Venue: Shrine Auditorium, Los Angeles, California (originally planned telecast); Conga Room, Los Angeles, California (press conference)
- Hosted by: Christina Aguilera and Jimmy Smits (originally planned telecast); Jimmy Smits and Paul Rodriguez (press conference)

Highlights
- Person of the Year: Julio Iglesias

Television/radio coverage
- Network: CBS (originally planned telecast)

The winners of the 2nd Annual Latin Grammy Awards were announced during a press conference on Tuesday, October 30, 2001, at the Conga Room in Los Angeles, California. The conference was broadcast live on the internet and hosted by Jimmy Smits and Paul Rodriguez. The original awards ceremony, which had been scheduled for September 11, 2001, was canceled. Alejandro Sanz was the ceremony's biggest winner, receiving four awards, including Album of the Year. Juanes won three awards, including Best New Artist.

== Cancellation ==
Prior to the date of the event, the Latin Grammys were moved from Miami to Los Angeles due to protests by Cuban exiles for allowing musicians living in Cuba to perform. The awards were to have been presented at the Shrine Auditorium with a CBS national telecast, to be hosted by Jimmy Smits and Christina Aguilera, on Tuesday, September 11, 2001. The telecast was canceled because of the terrorist attacks that morning in New York City, Washington, D.C., and Shanksville, Pennsylvania. After many discussions about rescheduling the ceremony, The Latin Recording Academy determined it would be impossible to do so. Instead, the winners were announced at a press conference on October 30 at the Conga Room. The cancellation of the event cost the organizers an estimate of $2 million in losses.

== Awards ==
=== General ===
Record of the Year

Alejandro Sanz — "El Alma Al Aire"

- Christina Aguilera — "Pero Me Acuerdo de Ti"
- Aterciopelados — "El Álbum"
- Gilberto Gil — "Esperando Na Janela"
- Juanes — "Fijate Bien"

Album of the Year

Alejandro Sanz — El Alma Al Aire

- Vicente Amigo — Ciudad de las Ideas
- Gilberto Gil — As Canções de Eu Tu Eles
- Juanes — Fíjate Bien
- Paulina Rubio — Paulina

Song of the Year

Alejandro Sanz — "El Alma Al Aire"

- Alejandro Lerner — "Amarte Así"
- Francisco Céspedes — "Dónde Está La Vida"
- Juanes — "Fijate Bien"
- Estéfano — "Y Yo Sigo Aquí" (Paulina Rubio)

Best New Artist

Juanes

- Bacilos
- Bebel Gilberto
- Sindicato Argentino del Hip Hop
- Manuel Vargas

=== Pop ===
Best Female Pop Vocal Album

Christina Aguilera — Mi Reflejo

- Natalia Oreiro — Tu Veneno
- Laura Pausini — Entre tú y mil mares
- Paulina Rubio — Paulina
- Thalía — Arrasando

Best Male Pop Vocal Album

Alejandro Sanz — El Alma Al Aire

- Pedro Guerra — Ofrenda
- Alejandro Lerner — Si Quieres Saber Quien Soy
- Luis Miguel — Vivo
- Antonio Vega — De Un Lugar Perdido

Best Pop Album by a Duo/Group with Vocals

Armando Manzanero — Duetos

- Bacilos — Bacilos
- Ella Baila Sola — Marta y Marilia
- Ana Torroja and Miguel Bosé — Girados en Concierto
- Chucho Valdés and Irakere — Unforgettable Boleros

Best Pop Instrumental Album

Nestor Torres — This Side of Paradise

- Andrés Alén — Pianoforte
- Lara & Reyes — World Jazz
- Keith Lockhart conducting The Boston Pops Orchestra — The Latin Album
- Marcus Viana — Terra

=== Rap/Hip-Hop ===
Best Rap/Hip-Hop Album

Sindicato Argentino del Hip Hop — Un Paso a la Eternidad

- DJ Kun — Crazy Atorrante
- Faces do Subúrbio — Como É Triste de Olhar
- Planet Hemp — A Invasão do Sagaz Homem Fumaça
- 7 Notas 7 Colores — La Mami Internacional Presenta: 7 Notas 7 Colores

=== Rock ===
Best Rock Solo Vocal Album

Juanes — Fíjate Bien

- Fito Páez — Rey Sol
- Rosendo Mercado — Canciones para Normales y Mero Dementes
- Cecilia Toussaint — Cecilia Toussaint
- Julieta Venegas — Bueninvento

Best Rock Album by a Duo/Group with Vocals

Aterciopelados — Gozo Poderoso

- Jarabe de Palo — De Vuelta y Vuelta
- Los Amigos Invisibles — Arepa 3000
- Los Rabanes — Rabanes
- Super Ratones — Mancha Registrada

Best Rock Song

Juanes — "Fijate Bien"

- Jarabe de Palo — "De Vuelta y Vuelta"
- Aterciopelados — "El Álbum"
- Fito Páez — "El Diablo de tu Corazón"
- Julieta Venegas — "Hoy No Quiero"

=== Tropical ===
Best Salsa Album

Tito Puente and Eddie Palmieri — Obra Maestra

- Issac Delgado — La Fórmula/Malecón
- Oscar D'León and Wladimir — Doble Play
- Grupo Niche — Propuesta
- Tito Rojas — Rompiendo Noches
- Gilberto Santa Rosa — Intenso

Best Merengue Album

Chichí Peralta — ...De Vuelta al Barrio

- Grupo Manía — Grupomania 2050
- Eddy Herrera — Me Enamore
- Manny Manuel — En Vivo!
- Toño Rosario — Yo Soy Toño

Best Traditional Tropical Album

Celia Cruz — Siempre Viviré

- Celina González and Reutilio — 50 Años...Como Una Reina
- Los Super Seven — Canto
- Plena Libre — Mas Libre
- Omara Portuondo — Buena Vista Social Club Presents Omara Portuondo

Best Tropical Song

Kike Santander — "Júrame (Merengue)" (Gisselle)

- Albita — "Azúca' Pa' Tu Amargura"
- Issac Delgado — "La Fórmula"
- Toño Rosario — "Yo Me Muero Por Ella"
- Alejandro Jaén and William Paz — "Yo Si Me Enamoré" (Huey Dunbar)

=== Regional ===
Best Ranchero Album

Pedro Fernández — Yo No Fuí

- Myrza — Homenaje a Fernando Z. Maldonado
- Paquita la del Barrio — Piérdeme el Respeto
- Mariachi Sol De México — Tequila con Limón con el Mariachi
- Manuel Vargas — Por Amor

Best Banda Album

Banda el Recodo — Contigo Por Siempre

- Banda Arkángel R-15 — Reina de Reinas
- Banda Limonense — Por Una Mujer Bonita
- Banda Machos — Mi Guitarra y Yo
- Carmen Jara — Arráncame la Vida

Best Grupero Album

Grupo Limite — Por Encima De Todo

- Caballo Dorado — No Dejes De Bailar
- Guardianes Del Amor — Un Millón De Lágrimas
- La Mafia — Contigo
- Mojado — Los Ángeles También Bailan

Best Tejano Album

Jimmy González y Grupo Mazz — Quién Iba a Pensar

- Emilio — El Rey Del Rodeo
- David Lee Garza & Los Musicales — 20/20
- Los Palominos — Obsesión
- A.B. Quintanilla & Los Kumbia Kings — Shhh!

Best Norteño Album

Ramón Ayala y Sus Bravos Del Norte — Quémame Los Ojos/Amigos Del Alma

- Grupo Atrapado — Atrapando Tú Corazón
- Los Tigres del Norte — De Paisano A Paisano
- Los Tucanes De Tijuana — Me Gusta Vivir De Noche
- Polo Urías y Su Máquina Norteña — De Chihuahua Para Ti

Best Regional Song

Jose Vaca Flores — "Borracho Te Recuerdo" (Vicente Fernández)

- Enrique Valencia — "De Paisano A Paisano" (Los Tigres del Norte)
- Francisco de Jesus Martínez — "Disculpe Usted" (Los Humildes)
- Oscar Treviño — "Mi Obsesión" (Los Palominos)
- Toscano — "Piérdeme El Respeto" (Paquita la del Barrio)

=== Traditional ===
Best Folk Album

El All-Stars de La Rumba Cubana — La Rumba Soy Yo

- Jaime Uribe Espita, José Revelo and John Villegas — Seresta
- Hevia — The Other Side
- Carlos Núñez — Mayo Longo
- Lázaro Ros — Yamayá

Best Tango Album

Carlos Franzetti — Tango Fatal

- Leopoldo Federico & Orquesta — De Antología
- Rodolfo Mederos and Nicolás Brizuela — Tangos
- Nuevo Quinteto Real — Tangos
- Salgan y de Lio — En Vivo en el Club del Vino

Best Flamenco Album

Vicente Amigo — Ciudad de las Ideas

- Montse Cortés — Alabanza
- Mayte Martín — Querencia
- José Mercé — Aire
- Estrella Morente — Mi Cante y un Poema
- Navajita Plateá — Hablando en Plata

=== Jazz ===
Best Latin Jazz Album

Paquito D'Rivera Quintet — Live at the Blue Note

- Chico O'Farrill — Carambola
- Danilo Pérez — Motherland
- David Sánchez — Melaza
- Chucho Valdés — Solo: Live in New York
- Various Artists — Calle 54

=== Brazilian ===
Best Brazilian Contemporary Pop Album

Marisa Monte — Memorias, Crônicas e Declarações de Amor

- Zeca Baleiro — Líricas
- Pedro Mariano — Voz no Ouvido
- Ivete Sangalo — Beat Beleza
- Herbert Vianna — O Som do Sim

Best Brazilian Rock Album

Rita Lee — 3001

- Charlie Brown Jr. — Nadando com os Tubarões
- Cidade Negra — Enquanto o Mundo Gira
- Pavilhão 9 — Reação
- Sidereal — Na Paz

Best Samba/Pagode Album

Zeca Pagodinho — Agua da Minha Sede

- Beth Carvalho — Pagode de Mesa 2 - Ao Vivo
- Harmonia do Samba — O Rodo
- Jair Rodrigues — 500 Anos de Folia - Volume 2
- Various Artists — Casa de Samba 4

Best MPB Album

Caetano Veloso — Noites do Norte

- Bebel Gilberto — Tanto Tempo
- Guinga — Suíte Leopoldina
- Ney Matogrosso — Batuque
- Emílio Santiago — Bossa Nova

Best Sertaneja Music Album

Pena Branca — Semente Caipira

- Bruno & Marrone — Acústico
- Leonardo — Quero Colo
- Roberta Miranda — Histórias de Amor
- Sérgio Reis — Sérgio Reis
- Rionegro & Solimões — Bate o Pé ao Vivo

Best Brazilian Roots/Regional Album

Gilberto Gil — As Canções de Eu Tu Eles

- Dominguinhos — Ao Vivo
- Forróçacana — Vamo Que Vamo
- Zé Ramalho — Nação Nordestina
- Alceu Valença — Forró Lunar

Best Brazilian Song

Raimundinho do Accordion, Targino Gondim and Manuca — "Esperando na Janela" (Gilberto Gil)

- Herbert Vianna — "A Lua Q Eu T Dei" (Ivete Sangalo)
- Carlinhos Brown and Marisa Monte — "Amor I Love You" (Marisa Monte)
- Caetano Veloso — "Sou Seu Sabiá"
- Caetano Veloso — "Zera a Reza"

=== Children's ===
Best Latin Children's Album

Miliki — Cómo Estan Ustedes?

- Los Niños de Cuba — Así Cantan Los Niños de Cuba
- Niños Adorando — Niños Adorando
- El Morro — Puras Para Niños, Vol. 1
- Colegio de Música de Medellín — Traralalala

=== Classic ===
Best Classical Album

Carlos Alvarez, Plácido Domingo, Jane Henschel and Ana Maria Martinez — Albeniz: Merlin

- Plácido Domingo and Ana Maria Martinez — Bacalov: Misa Tango
- Benjamin Echenique — México Barroco/Puebla VIII - Maitines para Nuestra Señora de Guadalupe/Manuel Arenzana
- Eduardo Diazmuñoz and Roberto Limon — Tango Mata Danzón Mata Tango
- Alberto Cruzprieto, Mercedes Gomez, Roberto Kolb and Jaime Marquez — Toussaint: Gauguin

=== Production ===
Best Engineered Album

Marcelo Anez, Gustavo Celis, Gordon Chinn, Charles Dye, Javier Garza, Mick Guzauski, Sebastian Krys, Freddy Pinero Jr., Eric Schilling, Joel Someilan, Ron Taylor, J. C. Ulloa and Robb Williams — Arrasando (Thalía)

- Luca Bignardi, Steve Churchyard, David Cole, Rupert Coulson, Jon Jacobs, Luis Quiñe, Ben "Jammin" Robbins and Ali Thomson — Entre tú y mil mares (Laura Pausini)
- Duda, Marcelo Loud, Sergio Ricardo and Luiz Paulo Serafim — Gil y Milton (Gilberto Gil and Milton Nascimento)
- Juan Ignacio Cuadrado and Fredy Marugan — Los Paraísos Desiertos (Ismael Serrano)
- Moogie Canazio and Marcelo Sabóia — Noites do Norte (Caetano Veloso)

Producer of the Year

K. C. Porter

- Alfredo Cerruti and Laura Pausini
- Rildo Hora
- Phil Ramone
- Gustavo Santaolalla

=== Music video ===
Best Music Video

Ricky Martin — "She Bangs"

- Juanes — "Fijate Bien"
- La Oreja de Van Gogh — "Paris"
- Os Paralamas do Sucesso — "Aonde Quer Que Eu Va"
- Fito Páez — "El Diablo En Tu Corazón"
- Alejandro Sanz — "Cuando Nadie Me Ve"

== See also ==
- List of entertainment affected by the September 11 attacks
- 2020 iHeartRadio Music Awards, a 2020 music award was cancelled in the wake of the COVID-19 pandemic
