= Adoro (song) =

Single by Armando Manzanero
- Language: Spanish
- B-side: "Perdoname"
- Released: 1967
- Length: 2:25
- Label: RCA Victor
- Songwriter: Armando Manzanero
- Producer: Orquestra De Eduardo Magallanes

"Adoro" (Adore) is a song by Mexican singer-songwriter Armando Manzanero. The song was originally recorded and released by RCA in 1967, becoming one of Manzanero's best known songs. Momento magazine in 1969 reported that the song had already sold 250,000 copies and been recorded in about 60 versions in its first two years.

The lyrics begin "Adoro, la calle en que nos vimos, la noche, cuando nos conocimos ..."

== Versions ==
After the initial run of "sixty versions" 1967-1969 noted by Momento magazine, the song has further been covered by artists including:

- "I Adore You", English version sung by Andra Willis, with new English lyrics by Sunny Skylar 1971
- "Ben böyleyim", Turkish version by Ayten Alpman in 1975
- Nini Rosso 1972
- Salomé 1970
- Adoro (Don't Tempt Me) by The Brass Ring Featuring Phil Bodner 1968
- Franck Pourcel and his Orchestra - as title song of the album of the same name 1970, which went Gold in Japan.
- Placido Domingo - as title song of the album of the same name 1982
- Alejandro Sanz, on El Alma al Aire and as duet on Manzanero's Duetos album.
- Noe Pro and The Semitones
- Italian singer Mina from the 1993 album Lochness.
- Ketil Bjørnstad and Svante Henryson on Night Song
- Bronco on Por el Mundo (1992), #7 on the Billboard Hot Latin Tracks chart. Recipient of the BMI Latin Award in 1994. Also recorded for the live album Primera File (2017) featuring Julieta Venegas.
- David Bisbal 2011
