= Mía (Armando Manzanero song) =

Single by Armando Manzanero

from the album A Mi Amor Con Mi Amor
- A-side: "Felicidad"
- Released: 1968
- Genre: Pop
- Songwriter: Armando Manzanero
- Producer: Nacho Maño

"Mía" ("Mine") is a song by Mexican songwriter Armando Manzanero included in the album A Mi Amor Con Mi Amor (1967). It was first released as a double-side single along with the track "Felicidad" in 1968.

On March 20, 2001, a new version of the song was recorded as a duet with Spanish singer Miguel Bosé and was included on Manzanero's album Duetos. In 2006, Bosé also included this track on his album Papito. Popular Mexican singers like José José and Luis Miguel have performed "Mía" live on several occasions.

Mia was also performed by Los Trios Los Panchos in LP called "El Trio Los Panchos y Armando Manzanero". It included 11 songs composed by Armando Manzanero. "Contigo Aprendi, Perdoname, Cuando Estoy Contigo, Llevatela, Quiero Para Ti, Esta Tarde Vi Llover, No, Adoro, Mia, La Casa and Voy A Pagar La Luz."
