= Conga Room =

Coordinates: 34.04523°N 118.26550°W

- Interactive map of Conga Room
- Address: 800 W. Olympic Blvd, Los Angeles, CA, 90015

Construction
- Opened: February 1998

Website
- www.congaroom.com

The Conga Room is a Los Angeles nightlife and private events location. Founded in 1998, the Conga Room's first location was on Wilshire Boulevard in Los Angeles, CA. The Conga Room is now located in Downtown Los Angeles' L.A. Live across from the Staples Center and continues to be the premier destination for pan-Latino night-life entertainment and beyond.

== History ==
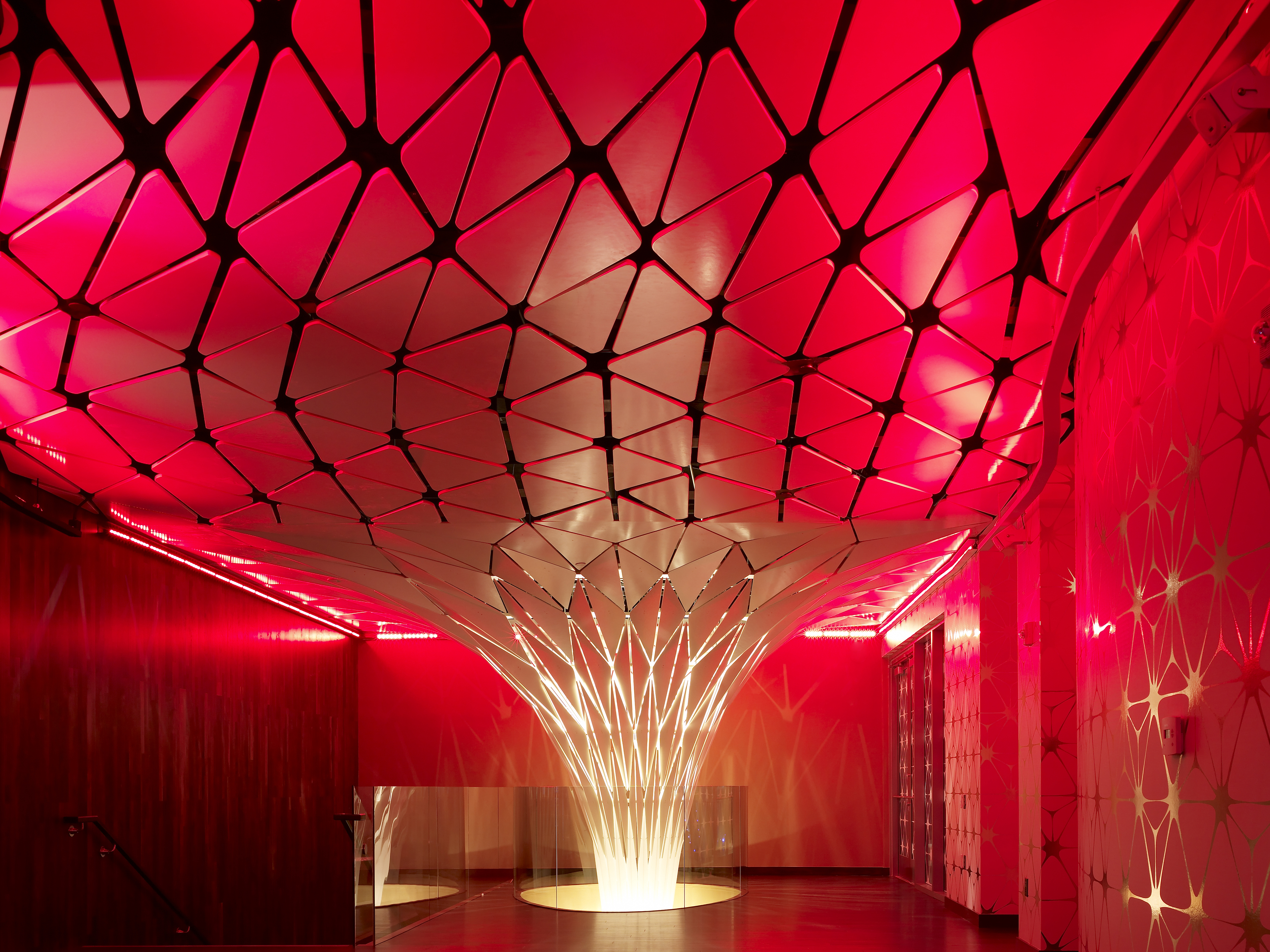
Inside of The Conga Room.

Beginning in 1998 as a venue for salsa music performances, the Conga Room expanded its booking to incorporate artists in other genres: pop/rock, EDM, world beat, jazz, and hip hop. As it outgrew its old location, the club reopened on December 10, 2008 at the L.A. Live district in downtown Los Angeles. The new club, with 15,000 sq ft (1,400 m^{2}) and a capacity of about 1,000, is nearly three times the size of the old club. Designed by Belzberg Architects, The Conga Room has a VIP area with views of the Staples Center and Nokia Plaza.

The club has hosted record launches, movie debuts, award shows and after-parties for various entertainment, social, political and sporting events. It hosted the press conference that announced the 2001 Latin Grammy Award winners.

The Conga Room is co-owned by Jimmy Smits, Jennifer Lopez, Paul Rodriguez, Sheila E., Amaury Nolasco, Baron Davis, Trevor Ariza, and will.i.am among others.

== Architecture ==
The original venue was closed with the intention of reopening a new venue at the LA Live campus with a more space, sophistication and design. The new 15,0000 square foot venue would house a large dance floor, a stage, multiple VIP areas, three bars, and a full-service restaurant.

The Belzberg Architects collaborated with Cuban artists Jorge Prado to design the famous Papaya Bar and Mexican muralist Sergio Arau to design the Surface Tattoos in the restaurant, Boca.

== Notable events ==
- The Carlos Santana post-Grammy party in 2000.
- The 2nd Annual Latin Grammy Awards announcement press conference in 2001 due to the show's cancellation on September 11, 2001.
