= Ciudad de las Ideas =

Ciudad de las Ideas, Ciudad de Ideas, City of Ideas may refer to:

- Ciudad de las Ideas (album), by Vicente Amigo
- Ciudad de las Ideas (conference), a conference created by the Andrés Roemer, held in Puebla, Mexico
