= 30 Años =

30 Años (Spanish "treinte años") or 30 Anos (Portuguese "trinta anos") may refer to:

- 30 Años Despues, album by the Mexican group Los Freddy's 1992
- 30 Años, album by Loquillo 2009
- 30 Años, album by Irakere
- 30 Años, album by Pedro Guerra
- 30 Años, album by Mercedes Sosa 1993
- 30 Años, album by Tropicália
- 30 Años, album by Nepal (band)
- 30 Años, Raíces (band) with Andrés Calamaro 2008
- 30 Años, album by Basque musician Ñaco Goñi
- 30 Años, Orquesta del Tango de la Ciudad de Buenos Aires, nominated Latin Grammy Award for Best Tango Album 2011
- 30 Años de Exitos by Los Toreros Muertos 1988
- 30 Años de Canciones Blindadas, Piero De Benedictis
- 30 Años de ser el Príncipe José José
- 30 años en Vivo Eva Ayllón 2000
- 30 Años de Sabor 1992 El Gran Combo de Puerto Rico

== See also ==
- A Mis Niños de 30 Años, by Miliki, List of number-one albums of 2000 (Spain)
