= Quisiera Ser =

2000 single by Alejandro Sanz

Single by Alejandro Sanz

from the album El Alma al Aire
- Language: Spanish
- Released: 20 October 2000
- Genre: Latin pop
- Length: 5:30
- Label: WEA Latina
- Songwriter: Alejandro Sanz

Alejandro Sanz singles chronology
| "Cuando Nadie Me Ve" (2000) | "Quisiera Ser" (2000) | "El Alma al Aire" (2001) |

Music video
- "Quisiera ser" on YouTube

"Quisiera Ser"
A 30-second sample of "Quisiera Ser", one of the album's uptempo tracks. Achy Obejas of the Chicago Tribune commented that the song "encapsulates all his charms and limitations" and noted that "his desire is on ample display, but there's something modest about it, something much more adult and weary than his teen fans might first realize."

"Quisiera Ser" (I Would Like to Be) is a song by Spanish singer-songwriter Alejandro Sanz from Sanz's sixth studio album El Alma al Aire. It was released as a single on October 20, 2000, by WEA Latina. The song is included on an EP consisting of four tracks: "Quisiera Ser", "Cuando Nadie Me Ve" and two additional mixes of "Quisiera Ser". The music video for the song was directed by Alejandro Toledo and features Spanish model Esther Cañadas.

"Quisiera Ser" is included on MTV Unplugged, the second live album by Sanz, produced by Humberto Gatica and released in 2001. In 2002, "Quisiera Ser" was performed live at the 44th Annual Grammy Awards as a duet between Sanz and Destiny's Child with Spanish and English lyrics.

== Grammy performance ==
In 2002 at the 44th Annual GRAMMY Awards, Sanz performed "Quisiera Ser" onstage with Destiny's Child. The song was performed in Spanish with English lyrics sung as a solo by Beyonce in the bridge section of the song. A plan for an Anglo album by Alejandro Sanz which was to include the English version of "Quisiera Ser" was abandoned with Beyonce filming "Goldmember" at that time.

Sanz was honored as the 2017 Latin Recording Academy Person of the Year event with a performance of "Quisiera Ser" by Camila Cabello with Juanes.

== Compilation records and videos ==
Alejandro Sanz' "Quisiera Ser" has appeared on compilation records and videos of Alejandro Sanz and various artists released on the WEA International and in 2017, by Universal Music.

- Various Artists - "People en Espanol: Latin Pop", 2002
- Alejandro Sanz - Grandes Exitos, 1991-2004
- Alejandro Sanz - Los Videos 97_04
- Alejandro Sanz - Coleccion Definitiva, 2011
- Alejandro Sanz - +Es+

== Chart performance ==
=== Weekly charts ===
| Chart (2000–2001) | Peak | Weeks on chart |
|---|---|---|
| Chile (EFE) | 9 | |
| El Salvador (EFE) | 1 | |
| Guatemala (EFE) | 9 | |
| Spain (AFYVE) | 4 | |
| US Hot Latin Songs (Billboard) | 17 | 16 |
| US Latin Pop Airplay (Billboard) | 13 | 23 |
| US Latin Tropical/Salsa Airplay (Billboard) | 9 | 15 |

=== Year-end charts ===
| Chart (2001) | Peak |
|---|---|
| US Latin Pop Airplay (Billboard) | 25 |
