= El Molinón =

Stadium at Gijón, Spain

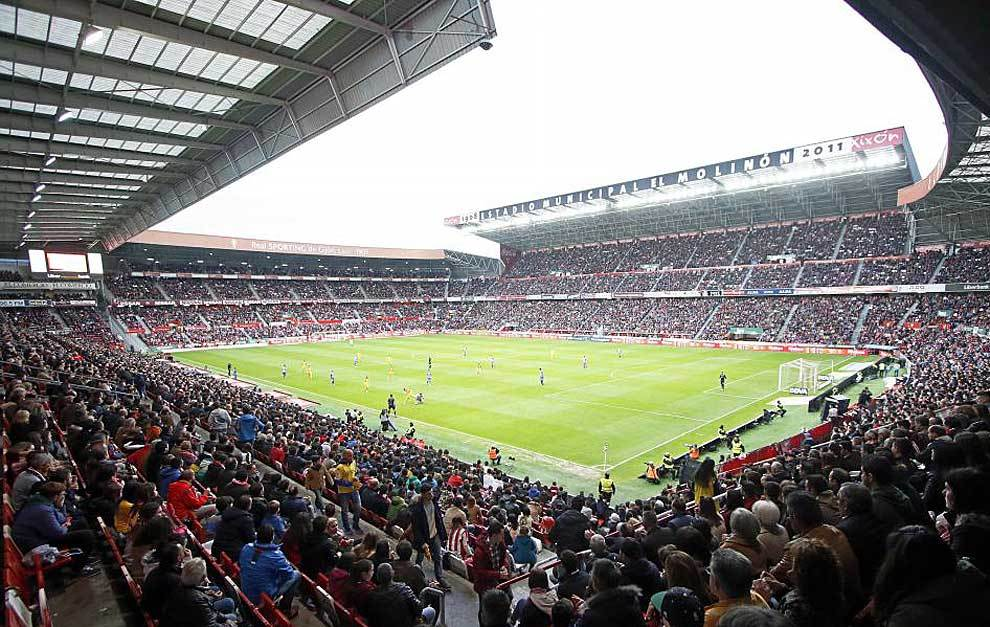
- UEFA
- Interactive map of El Molinón
- Full name: Estadio Municipal El Molinón-Enrique Castro "Quini"
- Location: Gijón, Asturias, Spain
- Coordinates: 43°32′10″N 5°38′14″W
- Owner: Ayuntamiento de Gijón
- Operator: Sporting de Gijón
- Capacity: 29,371
- Surface: Grass
- Record attendance: 42,000
- Field size: 105 m × 68 m (344 ft × 223 ft)

Construction
- Opened: 1908 or earlier
- Renovated: 1997–98
- Expanded: 1980–81, 2009–10

Tenants
- Sporting de Gijón (1917–present); Spain national football team (selected matches)

Estadio El Molinón (Spanish pronunciation: [esˈta.ðjo el mo.liˈnon]), officially Estadio Municipal El Molinón-Enrique Castro "Quini", is an association football stadium in Gijón, Asturias, Spain. The stadium is the home ground of Real Sporting de Gijón. With a capacity of 29,371 seats, El Molinón is the 20th largest stadium in Spain and the second largest in Asturias.

== History ==
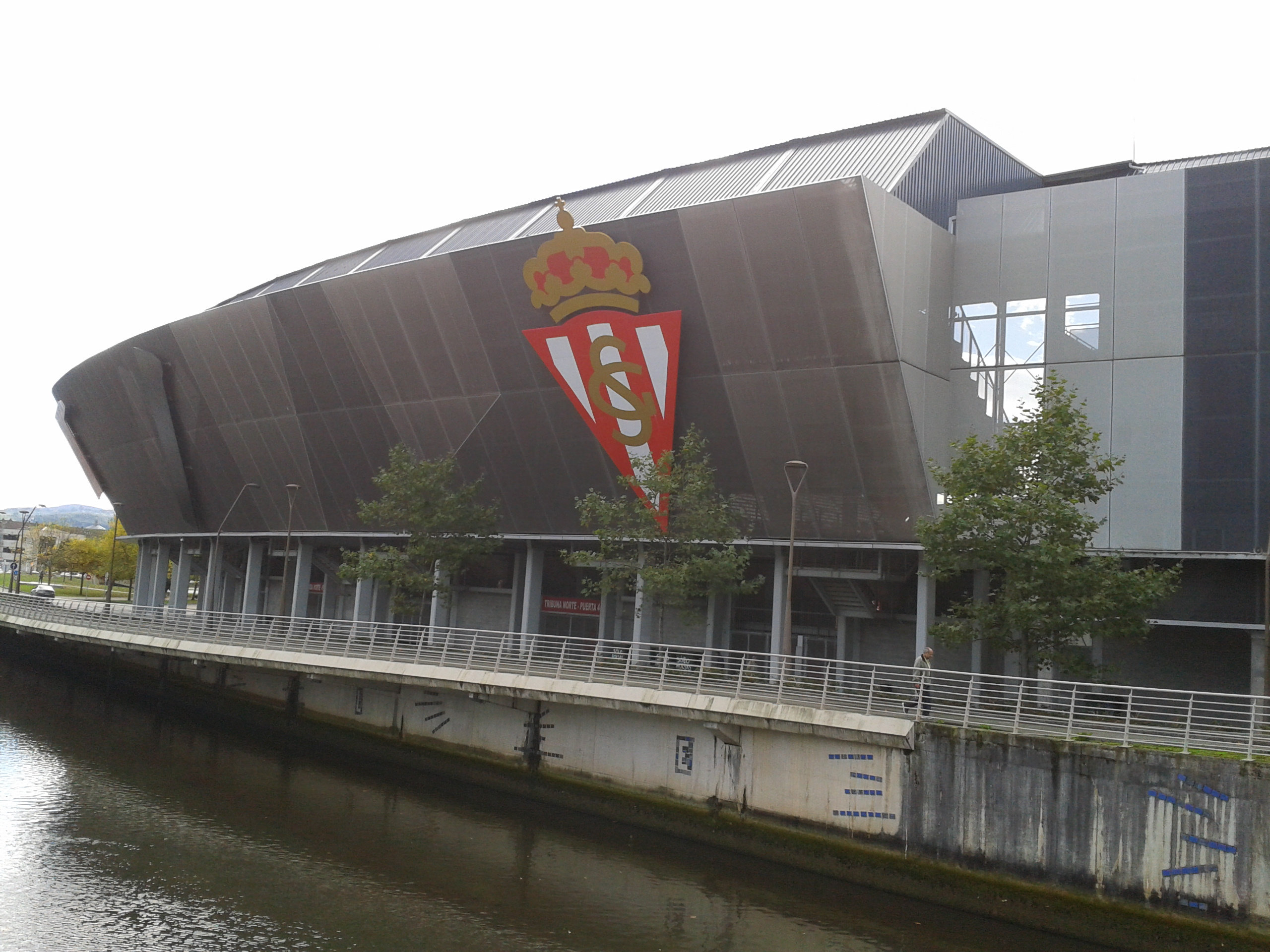
El Molinón, on the shore of the Piles river.

El Molinón is the oldest professional football field in Spain. It has been in use since at least 1908, and is located on the site of an old watermill, hence the stadium's name, the Spanish word for "big mill".

Real Sporting started to use El Molinón as official ground in 1917. The first official match was held on April 22, 1917 between Real Sporting and Arenas Club de Getxo as part of the 1917 Copa del Rey. Arenas won 0–1. On August 5 of that same year, the first great renovation of the stadium was finished.

On 2 May 1920, El Molinón held the 1920 Copa del Rey Final, where Barcelona defeated Athletic Bilbao by 2–0.

In 1924 Real Sporting bought El Molinón and became the owner of the stadium. In 1931 the main stand was destroyed by fire, but it was later re-built. In 1944, Gijón City Hall re-bought El Molinón due to Real Sporting's bad financial situation.

In 1968 four floodlights were installed at El Molinón and the first night match was played against Mestalla. On 11 April 1969, due to the financial trouble of Real Sporting, the stadium was formally sold to the city Town Hall by 30 million pesetas. On 30 November 1969, El Molinón became the first all-covered stadium in Spain and on 28 January 1970, the first match to be televised in Spain was played at El Molinón. Real Sporting defeated Osasuna by 3–0. The club also played all of its UEFA Cup home-matches in this stadium, including the win against A.C. Milan by 1–0 on 30 September 1987.

On 28 June 1995, Real Sporting beat the record attendance for the club at El Molinón, with 42,000 people at the relegation playoffs against Lleida.

During 1997–98, El Molinón prepared to adapt to the new UEFA and FIFA security legislation: all people must be seated and the fences must be removed. The stadium's capacity was reduced from 42,000 to 25,885. However, plans were put forward for the stadium to be renovated and expanded. After the expansion between 2009 and 2011, El Molinón's capacity again grew to 29,029 seats.

On 28 February 2018, just one day after the death of Real Sporting's all-time top scorer Quini, the City Council of Gijón agreed unanimously to rename the stadium as Estadio El Molinón-Enrique Castro "Quini" in his memory. Three months later, after a popular initiative, the gate 1 of the stadium was renamed as former goalkeeper Jesús Castro, brother of Quini.

On 8 January 2019, El Molinón used for the first time the video assistant referee at the Copa del Rey round of 16 match against Valencia. However, as in that season it was only used in La Liga, the stadium would not have again the VAR until the 2019–20 season.

The stadium hosted its first women's football match ever on 21 April 2019. 9,700 spectators attended the local derby between Real Sporting and Gijón FF.

It hosted matches for the 1982 FIFA World Cup and is one of the potential host cities for the 2030 FIFA World Cup which Spain will co-host along with Morocco and Portugal.

== League attendances ==
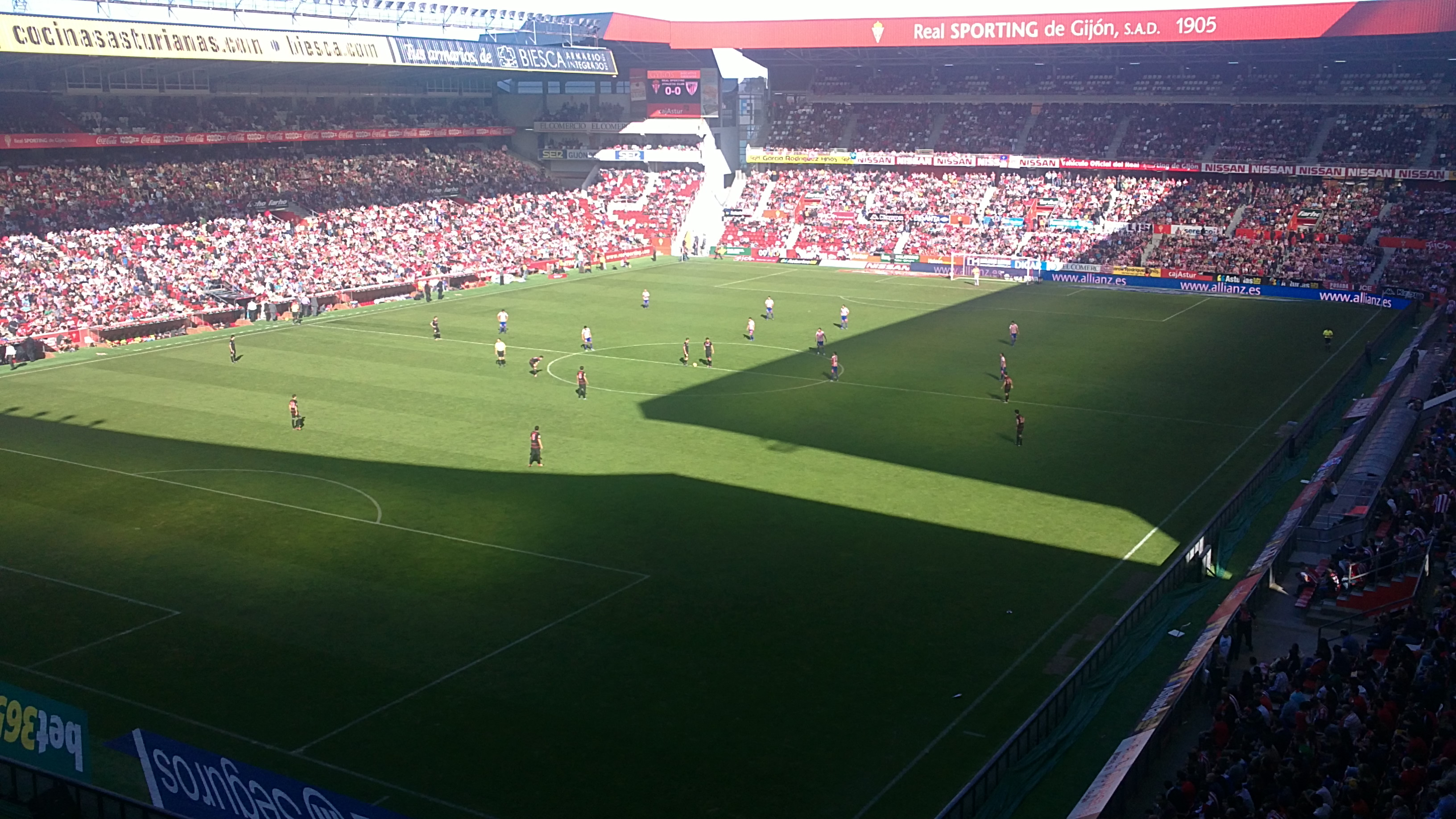
El Molinón, in a game versus Athletic Bilbao in October 2010.

This is a list of league and playoffs games attendances of Sporting de Gijón at El Molinón.

Sporting played all the competitive games at this stadium except one in the 2002–03 season due to the closure of the stadium after the game against Numancia. This game, not included in the table, was played against Almería at the Estadio Antonio Amilivia in León.

Games played under closed doors are not included.

Season	Total	High	Low	Average
1988–89 La Liga	364,659	32,000	12,397	19,193
1989–90 La Liga	350,546	26,000	13,318	18,450
1990–91 La Liga	348,320	27,335	13,152	18,333
1991–92 La Liga	336,283	25,000	14,500	17,699
1992–93 La Liga	307,839	20,000	9,200	16,202
1993–94 La Liga	326,240	26,200	10,300	17,171
1994–95 La Liga	406,900	38,000	9,000	20,345
1995–96 La Liga	453,768	31,000	14,300	21,608
1996–97 La Liga	403,606	30,000	12,000	19,219
1997–98 La Liga	292,259	21,226	8,900	15,382
1998–99 Segunda División	268,746	16,200	9,500	12,797
1999–2000 Segunda División	246,900	15,000	10,000	11,757
2000–01 Segunda División	252,500	18,000	6,500	12,024
2001–02 Segunda División	243,300	25,000	7,000	11,586
2002–03 Segunda División	241,000	18,600	8,500	12,050
2003–04 Segunda División	332,989	25,000	9,000	15,857
2004–05 Segunda División	239,900	14,000	5,000	11,424
2005–06 Segunda División	193,150	12,500	5,000	9,198
2006–07 Segunda División	228,975	14,000	6,000	10,904
2007–08 Segunda División	343,733	24,000	12,000	16,368
2008–09 La Liga	411,670	24,500	18,500	21,667
2009–10 La Liga	382,600	24,000	17,100	20,137
2010–11 La Liga	426,100	28,000	19,000	22,426
2011–12 La Liga	417,015	28,000	18,648	21,948
2012–13 Segunda División	333,483	19,951	8,187	15,880
2013–14 Segunda División	377,307	22,315	13,265	17,150
2014–15 Segunda División	405,686	26,873	12,240	19,318
2015–16 La Liga	440,723	28,140	19,536	23,196
2016–17 La Liga	428,313	25,899	15,365	22,543
2017–18 Segunda División	458,392	27,506	15,436	20,836
2018–19 Segunda División	386,070	26,748	8,600	18,384
2019–20 Segunda División (Note: Matches played under closed doors not included.)	280,245	22,072	13,728	17,515
2020–21 Segunda División	Season played under closed doors			
2021–22 Segunda División (Note: Some matches played with limited attendance.)	288,729	23,470	8,989	13,749
2022–23 Segunda División	365,633	24,790	13,430	17,411
2023–24 Segunda División	434,735	26,794	14,892	19,761
2024–25 Segunda División	443,832	25,702	18,690	21,135
2025–26 Segunda División	423,076	25,146	11,627	20,146

== International matches ==
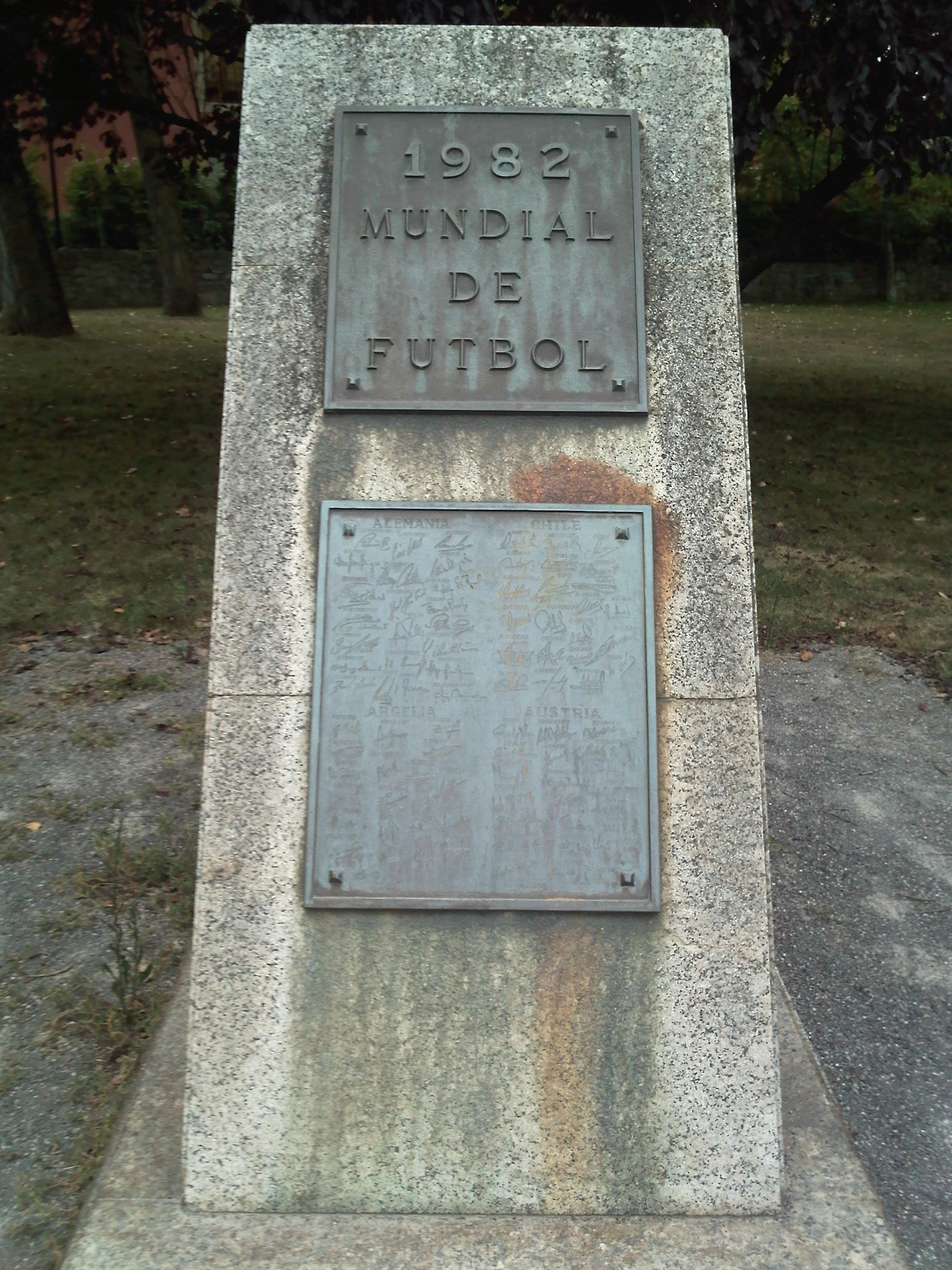
Commemorative monument of 1982 FIFA World Cup in front of El Molinón.

=== Spain national team matches ===
The first international match in El Molinón was held on 22 April 1928 between Spain and Italy. 49 years later, El Molinón held again another international match between Spain and Norway. On 22 March 2013, El Molinón held a World Cup Qualifying match between Spain and Finland. The match finished in a 1–1 draw.

Data	Opponent	Score	Competition	Att.
22 April 1928	Italy	1–1	Friendly match	
29 March 1978	Norway	3–0	Friendly match	25,000
16 April 1980	Czechoslovakia	2–2	Friendly match	25,000
24 September 1986	Greece	3–1	Friendly match	17,500
12 September 1990	Brazil	3–0	Friendly match	42,000
11 October 1997	Faroe Islands	3–1	1998 FIFA World Cup qualification	25,000
31 March 2004	Denmark	2–0	Friendly match	18,600
17 August 2005	Uruguay	2–0	Friendly match	20,000
22 March 2013	Finland	1–1	2014 FIFA World Cup qualification	27,637
24 March 2017	Israel	4–1	2018 FIFA World Cup qualification	20,321
8 September 2019	Faroe Islands	4–0	UEFA Euro 2020 qualification	23,644

=== 1982 FIFA World Cup ===
The stadium played host to West Germany’s three matches in Group B. Two of them were famous in the 1982 World Cup, West Germany's shock 1–2 defeat to Algeria being the first. After the result of Algeria's final group game was known, a rather uncontested 1–0 victory of West Germany against Austria sent both teams through at Algeria's expense. In German the match is known as Nichtangriffspakt von Gijón (lit. Non-aggression pact of Gijón) or Schande von Gijón (lit. Disgrace of Gijón). This shameful game at Gijon directly led to a change of the rules, requiring the last matches in the group phase to be played simultaneously to ensure that teams do not gain any advantage or disadvantage from having their matches scheduled last.

16 June 1982
17:15 CEST

West Germany	1–2	Algeria
Rummenigge 67'	Report	Madjer 54'; Belloumi 68'

El Molinón, Gijón
Attendance: 42,000
Referee: Enrique Labo Revoredo (Peru)

20 June 1982
17:15 CEST

West Germany	4–1	Chile
Rummenigge 9', 57', 66'; Reinders 81'	Report	Moscoso 90'

El Molinón, Gijón
Attendance: 42,000
Referee: Bruno Galler (Switzerland)

25 June 1982
17:15 CEST

West Germany	1–0	Austria
Hrubesch 10'	Report

El Molinón, Gijón
Attendance: 41,000
Referee: Bob Valentine (Scotland)

== Other ==
In 1981, some scenes of the film Volver a empezar, prized with the Academy Award for Best Foreign Language Film in 1983, were shot in El Molinón.

The stadium has hosted concerts by many famous artists, including:

- Bon Jovi (1996)
- Paul McCartney (2004)
- Dire Straits (1992)
- The Rolling Stones (1995)
- Bruce Springsteen (1993, 2003 and 2013)
- Sting (1991)
- Tina Turner (1991)
- Alejandro Sanz (2001)
