= Manuel Vargas (singer) =

- Genres: Mariachi
- Occupation: Singer-songwriter
- Website: mariachisangremexicana.com

Manuel Vargas is a singer-songwriter, former member of the Mariachi Vargas de Tecalitlán and lead performer of the Mariachi Sangre Mexicana. Vargas received two nominations at the 2nd Latin Grammy Awards for Best New Artist and Best Ranchero Album for his studio album Por Amor.
