= El Alma al Aire Tour =

2001–02 concert tour by Alejandro Sanz

El Alma Al Aire Tour
- World tour by Alejandro Sanz
- Associated album: El Alma al Aire
- Start date: February 17, 2001
- End date: June 30, 2002
- Legs: 3
- No. of shows: 26 in Europe; 25 in Latin America; 16 in North America; 67 total

Alejandro Sanz concert chronology
- Mas Tour (1998); El Alma Al Aire Tour (2001); Live USA 2002 tour (2002)

El Alma Al Aire Tour is a concert tour by Spanish singer Alejandro Sanz as promoting his album El Alma al Aire.

== Tour set list ==
1. Tiene Que Ser Pecado
2. Aquello Que Me Diste
3. Este Último Momento
4. Llega, Llegó Soledad
5. Cuando Nadie Me Ve
6. Me Iré
7. Hay Un Universo de Pequeñas Cosas
8. Siempre Es de Noche
9. Medley: Si Tú Me Miras, La Fuerza del Corazón, Si Hay Dios..., Viviendo Deprisa
10. Hoy Que No Estás
11. Mi Soledad y Yo
12. El Alma al Aire
13. Amiga Mía
14. Y, ¿Si Fuera Ella?
15. Quisiera Ser
16. Bulería
17. ¿Lo Ves?
18. Corazón Partío

== Tour dates ==
Date	City	Country	Venue
America
17 February 2001	Caracas	Venezuela	Poliedro de Caracas
20 February 2001	Bogotá	Colombia	Estadio El Campín
23 February 2001	Quito	Ecuador	Coliseo General Rumiñahui
26 February 2001	Viña del Mar	Chile	Quinta Vergara Amphitheater (Festival Viña del Mar 2001)
3 March 2001	Mexico City	Mexico	National Auditorium
4 March 2001	Mexico City	Mexico	National Auditorium
7 March 2001	Mexico City	Mexico	National Auditorium
8 March 2001	Mexico City	Mexico	National Auditorium
10 March 2001	Mexico City	Mexico	National Auditorium
11 March 2001	Mexico City	Mexico	National Auditorium
14 March 2001	Mexico City	Mexico	National Auditorium
15 March 2001	Mexico City	Mexico	National Auditorium
18 March 2001	Mexico City	Mexico	National Auditorium
20 March 2001	Monterrey	Mexico	Auditorio Coca-Cola
21 March 2001	Monterrey	Mexico	Auditorio Coca-Cola
23 March 2001	Guadalajara	Mexico	Plaza de Toros
24 March 2001	Guadalajara	Mexico	Plaza de Toros
28 March 2001	Lima	Peru	Jockey Club del Perú
30 March 2001	Santiago	Chile	Pista Atlética Estadio Nacional
1 April 2001	Montevideo	Uruguay	Tribuna Olímpica Centenario
3 April 2001	Rosario	Argentina	Estadio Rosario Central
5 April 2001	Córdoba	Argentina	Estadio Córdoba
7 April 2001	Buenos Aires	Argentina	Estadio Velez
28 April 2001	San Juan	Puerto Rico	Roberto Clemente Coliseum
United States
2 May 2001	Miami	United States	James Knight Center
3 May 2001	Miami	United States	James Knight Center
5 May 2001	New York City	United States	Radio City Music Hall
7 May 2001	Newark	United States	New Jersey Performing Arts Center
9 May 2001	Chicago	United States	Aragon Ballroom
11 May 2001	Los Angeles	United States	Universal Amphitheatre
12 May 2001	San Diego	United States	Cox Arena
15 May 2001	McAllen	United States	Villarreal convention center
16 May 2001	Laredo	United States	Laredo Civic Center
18 May 2001	El Paso	United States	U.T.E.P
20 May 2001	Houston	United States	Aerial Theater
Latinamerica
2 June 2001	Santo Domingo	Dominican Republic	Palacio de los Deportes
Europe
16 June 2001	Córdoba	Spain	Estadio Nuevo Arcángel
20 June 2001	Burgos	Spain	Estadio Municipal de El Plantío
22 June 2001	Valladolid	Spain	Estadio Nuevo José Zorrilla
24 June 2001	Murcia	Spain	Estadio de La Condomina
26 June 2001	Granada	Spain	Estadio Nuevo Los Cármenes
28 June 2001	Madrid	Spain	Vicente Calderón Stadium
1 July 2001	Zaragoza	Spain	Estadio La Romareda
3 July 2001	Barcelona	Spain	Palau Sant Jordi
4 July 2001	Barcelona	Spain	Palau Sant Jordi
6 July 2001	Barcelona	Spain	Palau Sant Jordi
8 July 2001	Seville	Spain	Estadio Olímpico Sevilla
10 July 2001	Málaga	Spain	La Rosaleda Stadium
13 July 2001	Elche	Spain	Estadio Manuel Martínez Valero
15 July 2001	Valencia	Spain	Estadio del Levante U.D.
19 July 2001	Albacete	Spain	Estadio Carlos Belmonte
21 July 2001	Vigo	Spain	Estadio de Balaídos
23 July 2001	A Coruña	Spain	Coliseum da Coruña
25 July 2001	Gijón	Spain	Estadio Municipal El Molinón
27 July 2001	Pamplona	Spain	El Sadar Stadium
29 July 2001	Vitoria-Gasteiz	Spain	Mendizorrotza Stadium
3 August 2001	Santander	Spain	Campa de la Magdalena
6 August 2001	San Fernando	Spain	Estadio Iberoamericano Bahía Sur
8 August 2001	Almería	Spain	Recinto ferial
11 August 2001	Palma de Mallorca	Spain	Lluís Sitjar Stadium
20 September 2001	Las Palmas de Gran Canaria	Spain	Institución Ferial de Canarias
22 September 2001	Tenerife	Spain	Recinto ferial
Norteamérica II

=== Box office score data (Billboard) ===
Venue	City	Tickets sold / available	Gross revenue
Auditorio Nacional	Mexico City	80,909 / 89,154 (91%)	$2,818,519
	Total	80,909 / 89,154 (91%)	$2,818,519

== Band ==
- Ludovico Vagnone – Musical Director, guitars and vocal
- Josep Salvador – Guitar and vocal
- Mauricio Scaramella – Drums
- Luis Duizaides – Percussion
- J. Agustín Guereñu – Bass
- Píero Vallero – Keyboards, sax and vocal
- Alfonso Pérez – Keyboards
- Lulo Pérez – Trumpet, percussion and keyboards
- Carlos Martín – Trombone
- Jon Robles – Saxophone
- Helen de Quiroga, Txell Sust, Luis Miguel Baladrón – Vocals
