= De mi corazón al aire =

Studio album by Vicente Amigo
- Released: 1991
- Genre: Flamenco
- Length: 35:10
- Label: Sony Music Spain

De mi corazón al aire is the first studio album of Vicente Amigo. It was released in 1991 via Sony.

== Track listing ==
No.	Title	Length
1.	"De Mi Corazón Al Aire"	3:41
2.	"Reino De Silia"	4:16
3.	"Gitano De Lucía"	3:47
4.	"Morente"	4:04
5.	"Maestro Sanlúcar"	3:49
6.	"Callejón De La Luna"	5:55
7.	"Morao"	4:54
8.	"Tío Arango"	4:44
Total length:		35:10
