= Su piano y su música =

Studio album by Armando Manzanero
- Released: 1968
- Genre: Bolero
- Label: Arcano, RCA Victor

Su piano y su música is a studio album by Armando Manzanero. It was released in 1968 by Arcano Records, and RCA Victor. In 2015, it was selected by Billboard magazine, as one of the "50 Essential Latin Albums of the Last 50 Years". The original recording of "Somos Novios (It's Impossible)" was inducted into the Latin Grammy Hall of Fame in 2001.

== Track listing ==
Side A

1. "Pensando En Ti"
2. "Si Me Faltas Tu"
3. "Esta Tarde Vi Llover"
4. "Yo No Se"
5. "Adoro"
6. "Todavia"

Side B

1. "Yo Se Que Te Amo"
2. "Contigo Aprendi"
3. "Somos Novios (It's Impossible)"
4. "Deja"
5. "Tengo"
6. "Felicidad"
