= Luis de Córdoba =

Luis de Córdoba, born Luis Pérez Cardoso in Posadas on May 15, 1950, is a Spanish flamenco singer. He won 2 national awards in the National Contest of Flamenco Art in Córdoba in 1974 and 1977 and numerous others.

== Career ==
In 1980 and in 1986, he participated in the Bienal de Sevilla. In 1994, he was featured on a compilation CD entitled Duende: From Traditional Masters to Gypsy Rock alongside fellow singers Camaron de la Isla, Enrique Morente, and top guitarists such as Paco de Lucia, Sabicas, Ramon Montoya and Tomatito. In December 2007, he was honored by the University of Cordoba with the St. Thomas Aquinas Award, and in June 2009, took the position as head of flamenco at the university. He is the author of the book El Flamenco: Tradición y Libertad (Flamenco: Tradition and Freedom) (2001).
