= Vicente Amigo =

Spanish flamenco composer and virtuoso guitarist

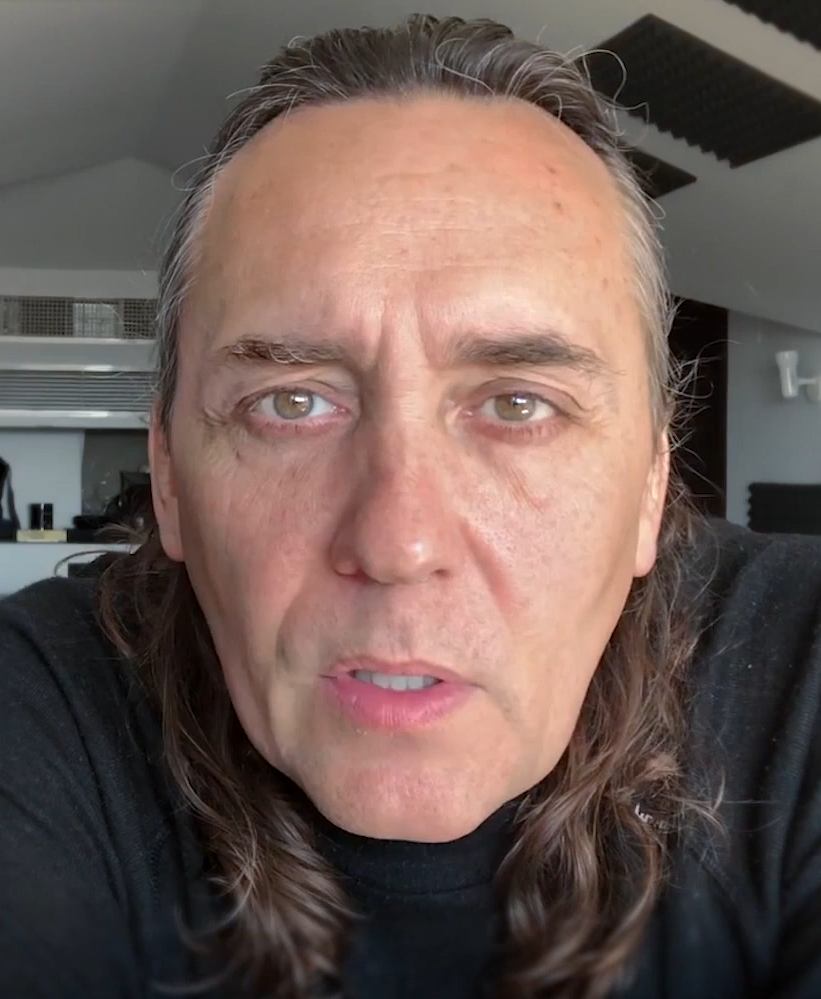
- Amigo in 2020

Background information
- Born: Vicente Amigo Girol; 25 March 1967 (age 59)
- Origin: Guadalcanal, Seville, Andalusia, Spain
- Genres: Flamenco music
- Occupations: Musician, composer
- Instrument: Guitar
- Years active: 1988–present
- Website: vicenteamigo.com

Vicente Amigo Girol (born 25 March 1967) is a Spanish flamenco composer and guitarist, born in Guadalcanal near Seville. He has played as an accompanying guitarist on recordings by flamenco singers Camarón de la Isla, and Luis de Córdoba, and he has acted as a producer for Remedios Amaya and José Mercé. His album Ciudad de las Ideas won the 2001 Latin Grammy for the Best Flamenco Album and the 2002 Ondas award for the best Flamenco work.

== Biography ==
Amigo was raised in Córdoba, where he took guitar lessons and later improved his playing with Manolo Sanlúcar, with whom he worked for ten years. After a period of accompaniment which began with El Pele, he devoted himself almost exclusively to playing concerts in 1988. De Mi Corazón al Aire (From Out of My Heart, 1991) was his first solo record. An admirer of Paco de Lucía since childhood, Amigo took part with him in the show Leyendas de la guitarra (Legends of the Guitar) in Seville.

Amigo has worked with Amaia Montero, Khaled, Miguel Bosé, Carmen Linares, Manolo Sanlúcar, Wagner Tiso, Rosario, Nacho Cano, Alejandro Sanz, Sting, Paco de Lucía, Stanley Jordan, John McLaughlin, Al Di Meola, and Milton Nascimento.

== Discography ==
=== As lead ===
- De mi corazón al aire (CBS/Sony, 1991)
- Vivencias Imaginadas (CBS/Sony, 1995)
- Poeta (CBS/Sony, 1997)
- Del Amanecer... with Jose Merce (Virgin, 1998)
- Ciudad de las Ideas (2000)
- Un Momento en el Sonido (Columbia, 2005)
- Paseo de Gracia (Sony, 2009)
- Tierra (Sony, 2013)
- Memoria de los Sentidos (Sony, 2017)
- Andenes del Tiempo (2024)

=== As accompanist ===
With Miguel Bosé

- Bajo El Signo De Cain (WEA, 1993)
- Laberinto (WEA, 1995)
- Mordre Dans Ton Coeur (WEA, 1997)
- Papitwo (WEA, 2012)

With others

- Remedios Amaya, Me Voy Contigo (Hispavox, EMI 1997)
- Pedro Aznar, Mudras: Canciones De a Dos (Tabriz Music, 2003)
- David Bisbal, Premonicion (Vale Music, 2006)
- Nacho Cano, El Lado Femenino (Virgin, 1996)
- Nacho Cano, A un Musical De (Warner, 2008)
- Los Chunguitos, Vive a Tu Manera en Directo (EMI, 1988)
- Camarón de la Isla, Soy Gitano (El Pais, 2010)
- Tino di Geraldo, Burlerias (Nuevos Medios, 1994)
- Roberto Fonseca, Zamazu (Enja, 2007)
- GNR, Sob Escuta (EMI, 1994)
- Josh Groban, Bridges (Reprise, 2018)
- Alberto Iglesias, Hable Con Ella (Milan, 2002)
- Azucar Moreno, Ojos Negros (Epic, 1992)
- Enrique Morente & Lagartija Nick, Omega (El Europeo Musica, 1996)
- Carlos Nunez, Os Amores Libres (RCA Victor, 1999)
- Potito, Andando por Los Caminos (CBS, 1990)
- Manolo Sanlucar, Tauromagia (Polydor, 1988)
- Alejandro Sanz, Más (WEA, 1997)
- Alejandro Sanz, El Alma al Aire (WEA, 2000)
- Sting, Sacred Love (A&M, 2003)
- Wagner Tiso, Baobab (Philips, 1990)
- Wagner Tiso, Brazilian Scenes (Kardum/Iris, 1997)
- Potito, Mi reencuentro (Concert Music Entertainment S.L, 2018)
- El Pele, Canto (BMG Music Spain S.A, 2003)
- Eliane Elias, Around the City (RCA Victor, 2006)
