= Ciudad de las Ideas (album) =

Studio album by Vicente Amigo
- Released: 2000
- Genre: Flamenco
- Label: BMG
- Producer: Vicente Amigo

Vicente Amigo chronology
Poeta (2001)	Ciudad de las Ideas (2000)	Canto (2004)

Ciudad de las Ideas (City of Ideas) is an album released by Spanish performer Vicente Amigo in 2000. The album earned Amigo a Latin Grammy Award nomination for Album of the Year^{[I]} and won Best Flamenco Album.

== Track listing ==
All tracks written and performed by Vicente Amigo. This information adapted from Allmusic.

No.	Title	Length
1.	"Tres Notas Para Decir Te Quiero"	4:50
2.	"La Tarde Es Caramelo (Alegrías)"	7:07
3.	"Ojos de la Alhambra"	6:30
4.	"Compare Manuel (Tangos)"	5:18
5.	"Bolero de Vicente"	6:02
6.	"Tatá"	4:27
7.	"Córdoba (Soleá)"	6:09
8.	"Ciudad de las Ideas"	8:27

^{^[I]} The nomination was shared with Boris Alarcón, Antonio Algarrada, Oscar Clavel and Nigel Walker (engineers/mixers).
