= Duetos (Armando Manzanero album) =

- Cover art for the Mexican edition.

Studio album by Armando Manzanero
- Released: 13 November 2000
- Language: Spanish
- Label: WEA
- Producer: Nacho Mañó: Armando Manzanero; Emanuele Ruffinengo

Armando Manzanero chronology
Amor Mío (2000)	Duetos (2000)	Duetos 2 (2002)

Duetos (transl. Duets) is a studio album by Mexican singer-songwriter Armando Manzanero. It was released on 13 November 2000 by WEA. It is a duet album featuring various artists performing Manzanero's songs along with him. Manzanero worked with Nacho Mañó and Emanuele Ruffinengo to produce the album with recording taking place in Mexico, Spain, and the United States. Musically, the arrangement of the record takes inspiration from multiple styles, namely jazz, blues, and flamenco.

Following its release, Duetos was met with mixed reactions from music critics. The record's arrangement was praised, although critics were divided on some of the duets. At the 2nd Annual Latin Grammy Awards in 2001, Duetos won Best Pop Vocal Album, Duo or Group. It was certified gold in Spain and sold over 100,000 copies within three weeks of its release.

== Background and musical style ==
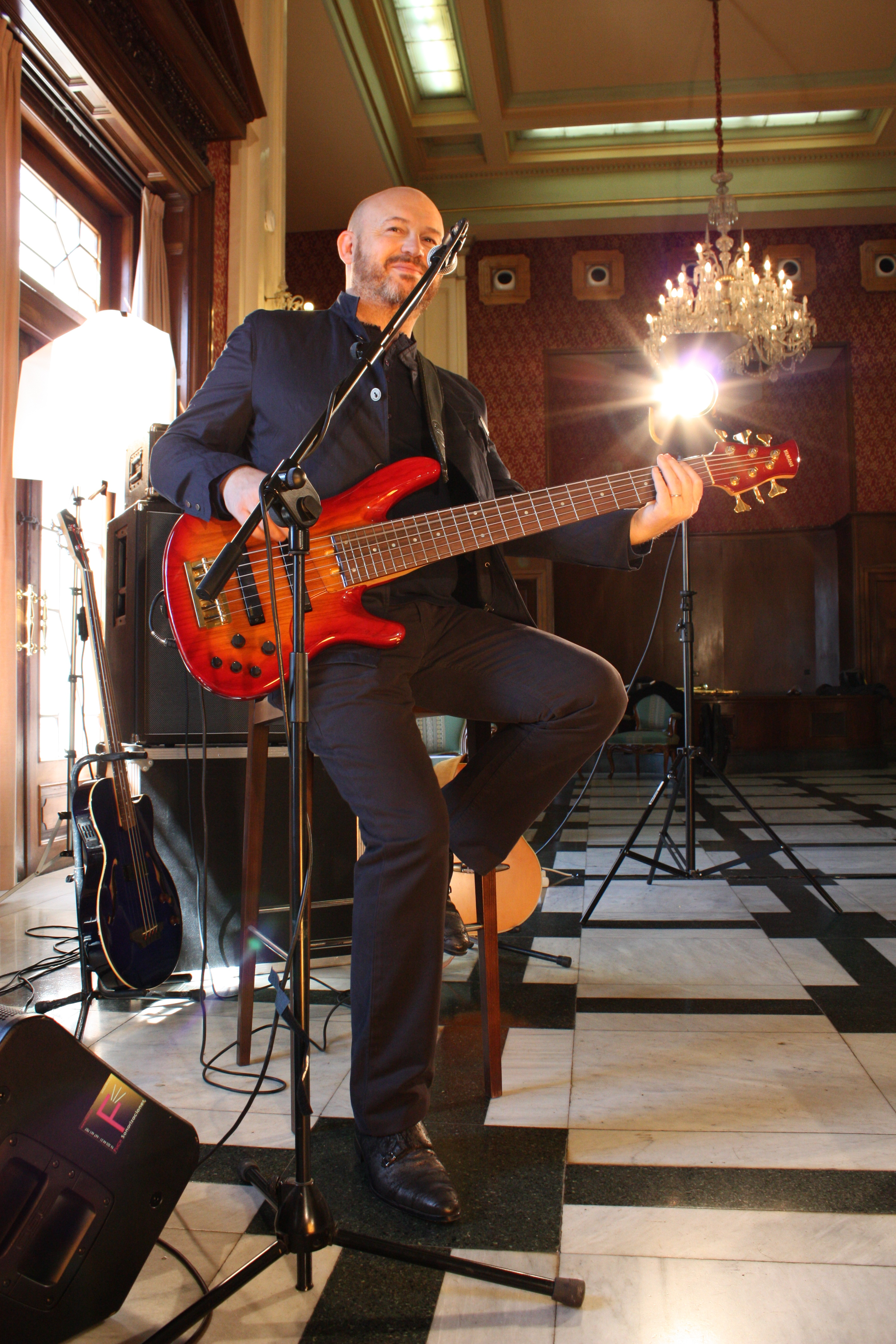
Nacho Mañó, the bassist for Presuntos Implicados, was one of the co-producers for Duetos.

Following the release of his studio album, Amor Mio (2000), Armando Manzanero announced that his next project would be an album of duets. He conceived the idea of this project when the singer met members of Presuntos Implicados. He previously recorded his song "Esperaré" with the band on their cover album, Version Original (1999). "This album was very easy to make. I've never before recorded with such naturalness, with the charm and magic that the project gave me, which is also 100 percent Spanish," Manzanero commented. It was co-produced by Emanuele Ruffinengo and Nacho Mañó (the bassist for Presuntos Implicados) and the album was recorded in Mexico, Madrid, Spain, and Miami, Florida.

Duetos features several artists such as Olga Tañón, Alejandro Sanz, Lucero, and Miguel Bosé performing Manzanero's well-known songs along with the artist. Manzanero composed two original songs for the album, "Antes de... Después de..." and "La Mujer Que Me Ama". The former is a duet with his son Juan Pablo Manzanero while the latter is performed with Spanish duo Cómplices. The artists who were selected were not chosen by Manzanero, but by his label WEA. The artist also invited Luis Miguel to record "Por Debajo de la Mesa", a song Manzanero composed for Luis Miguel on the album, Romances (1997), but was unable to reach out to him. Musically, the arrangement of Duetos draws inspiration from various styles namely jazz, blues, and flamenco. "Somos Novios" is performed as a bossa nova song. On "Esperaré", the track starts as a bolero before transitioning into salsa.

== Release ==
Two versions of the album were released, one for Spain which mainly features artists from the country, and a Mexican version where some of the Spanish musicians were replaced by those from Mexico. The Spanish edition of Duetos was released on 13 November 2000, while the latter version was launched on 25 January 2001 by WEA Mexico. In Mexico "No" was released as the album's lead promotional single from the album, with "No Existen Límites" was also released as a promotional single in 2001. In Spain, the Spanish editions of "Somos Novios", " Contigo Aprendí", and "La Mujer Que Me Ama" were released as promotional singles in the country.

== Reception ==
Professional ratings
Review scores
Source	Rating
El Norte	3/5 stars
La Prensa	4/5 stars

Deborah Davis of El Norte rated the album three-out-of-five stars; she praised the duets with Ricardo Montaner, Francisco Cespedes, and Carlos Cuevas as the best tracks due to the artists already being associated with romantic music and commended Bosé's performance on "Mía". However, she felt that Café Quijano "ruined" "Esperaré" and Manzanero's son "left us wanting to rediscover him with 'Antes de, Despues de'." Billboard editor Leila Cobo noted that the arrangements are "for the most part, tailor-made" and found "Adoro", "Esperare", and "No" as the album stand outs. However, she noted that Manzanero is not a "strong singer" and that his performances on the songs are "as limited as possible here". Eliso Cardona wrote a positive review of Duetos which he regarded as the "checkmate of a craftsman who knows how to connect with young audiences without altering the essence of an old repertoire". Cardona commented that the arrangements "manage to banish the sepia tone" and affirmed that the album is for collectors.

La Prensa critics Daniel Domínguez and Karla Jimenez rated the album four-out-of-five stars stating Manznero "amazes" with his the new versions of his songs. Jose Fernandez of Business Mexico gave the record a mixed review. While he lauded the performances of several acts including Olga Tañón, Café Quijano, Presuntos Implicados, he found others such as Bosé's vocals "not so special", Lucero's "powerful singing as "flattened" on "No Existen Limites", and "Antes de... Despues de..." as "lackluster". Fernadnez also felt that the lack of Luis Miguel's participation made the album feel "incomplete" and concluded that while the record can be a "passable introduction to Manzanero's romantic boleros for beginners, true fans won't find much in it."

At the 2nd Annual Latin Grammy Awards in 2001, Duetos won Best Pop Vocal Album, Duo or Group. The Spanish edition of Duetos was certified gold by Productores de Música de España for shipping over 50,000 units. Within three weeks of its release, the album sold over 100,000 copies.

== Track listing ==
All tracks are written by Armando Manzanero.

Duetos: Lo Mejor de Armando Manzanero
No.	Title	Length
1.	"Somos Novios" (featuring Lolita Flores)	3:20
2.	"Adoro" (featuring Alejandro Sanz)	4:22
3.	"Esperaré" (featuring Café Quijano)	3:26
4.	"Contigo Aprendí" (featuring La Barbería del Sur)	3:41
5.	"Esta Tarde Ví Llover" (featuring Presuntos Implicados)	3:35
6.	"La Mujer Que Me Ama" (featuring Cómplices)	4:37
7.	"Voy a Apagar la Luz" (featuring Rafa Sánchez)	4:22
8.	"No" (featuring Malú)	3:13
9.	"No Sé Tú" (featuring Francisco Céspedes)	3:59
10.	"Antes de... Después de..." (featuring Juan Pablo Manzanero)	3:30
11.	"No Existen Límites" (featuring Lydia)	4:34
12.	"Mía" (featuring Miguel Bosé and Ariel Rot)	3:20
Total length:		45:21

Mexican edition
No.	Title	Length
1.	"Somos Novios" (featuring Olga Tañón)	3:28
2.	"Adoro" (featuring Alejandro Sanz)	4:21
3.	"No" (featuring Edith Márquez)	3:13
4.	"Te Extraño" (featuring Ricardo Montaner)	3:51
5.	"No Existen Límites" (featuring Lucero)	2:34
6.	"No Sé Tú" (featuring Francisco Céspedes)	4:00
7.	"Esta Tarde Ví Llover" (featuring Presuntos Implicados)	3:37
8.	"Esperaré" (featuring Café Quijano)	4:24
9.	"Mía" (featuring Miguel Bosé and Ariel Rot)	4:33
10.	"Antes de... Después de..." (featuring Juan Pablo Manzanero)	3:28
11.	"Contigo Aprendí" (featuring Carlos Cuevas)	3:40
Total length:		41:10

== Personnel ==
The following credits are from AllMusic

- Dayan Abad – tres
- Pedro Barceloe – drums
- Luis Carmona – palmas
- Chris Cameron – arranger, director, piano
- Tom Cardenas – drums
- Luis Dulzaides – bongos, congas, guitar, maracas
- Benny Faccone – mixing
- Juan Luis Gimenez – electric guitar
- Bernie Grundman – mastering
- Mariano Losada – assistant engineer
- Armando Manzanero – piano, producer
- Segundo Mijares – flute, saxophone
- Nacho Mañó – bass, acoustic guitar, producer
- Pablo Navarro – programming
- El Negri –palmas
- Marcelo Novati – drums
- Barbara Oberhagemann – producer
- Antonio Pallare trombone
- John Parsons – guitar
- Paquete – palmas, Spanish guitar
- Pavo –performer
- Gino Pavone – bongos, shaker
- Lulo Perez – arranger, fiscorno, timbales, trumpet
- Gisela Renes – horn
- Juan Ramos – keyboards, soprano saxophone
- Emanuele Ruffinengo – arranger, engineer, keyboards, piano, producer, programming
- Eduardo Ruiz – assistant engineer
- Antonio Serranos – harmonica
- Javier Salas – photography
- Joan Tomas – photography
- Roberto Maccagno – engineer, mixing
- Saint Navalon – Rhodes piano
- Salva Ortiz – drums
- Perico Sambeat – alto saxophone
- Rafa Sanudo – design, photography
- Vicente Sabater – programming
- Pepo Scherman – assistant engineer
- Ludovico Vagnone – acoustic guitar, electric Guitar
- Oscar Vinader – engineer, mixing
- Steve Walsh – engineer

== Certification ==
Region	Certification	Certified units/sales
Spain (Promusicae)	Gold	50,000^{^}
^{^} Shipments figures based on certification alone.

== Release history ==
Release dates for Duetos
Region	Date	Edition	Label
Spain	13 November 2000	Spanish edition	WEA
Mexico	25 January 2001	Mexican edition	WEA Mexico
United States	20 March 2001	Mexican edition	WEA Latina

== See also ==
- 2000 in Latin music
