= Hagy Belzberg =

American architect

- Born: Hagy Belzberg; August 30, 1964 (age 62); Tel Aviv, Israel
- Education: Arizona State University, Harvard University
- Occupation: Architect
- Practice: Belzberg Architects
- Website: belzbergarchitects.com

Hagy Belzberg, FAIA, OAA (born August 30, 1964) is an Israeli-born American architect based in Santa Monica, California. He is the founding partner of the architecture and interior design firm Belzberg Architects.

== Life and career ==
Belzberg was born in Tel Aviv to a sculptor (his mother) and an aerospace engineer (his father), and raised in Los Angeles. He received a Bachelor of Science degree from Arizona State University and a Master of Architecture with Distinction from Harvard's Graduate School of Design. While a student, he spent the summers interning at Frank O. Gehry & Associates, and after graduation, returned to LA to work there for three months before leaving to found Belzberg Architects in 1997.

His work is located across North America including projects in Mexico City, Toronto, Edmonton, Arizona, California, Georgia, Hawaii, and Washington D.C. Belzberg was honored by the California Council of American Institute of Architects as an Emerging Talent in 2008 and an Emerging Voice by the Architectural League of New York in the same year. In 2010, he was elected to the college of Fellow of the American Institute of Architects for "notable contributions to the advancement of the profession of architecture".

He was a two-term director of the Los Angeles Chapter of the American Institute of Architects from 2000 to 2002, and in 2014, was inducted into the Interior Design Magazine Hall of Fame.

Since 1994, Belzberg has held undergraduate- and graduate-level teaching and lecture positions at UCLA, University of Southern California (USC), and the Southern California Institute of Architecture.

His firm's work has been published in over 200 publications in more than 35 countries, has received numerous awards, and has been part of several exhibitions including the 2013 Museum of Contemporary Art, Los Angeles's "A New Sculpturalism, Contemporary Architecture from Southern California".

== Books ==
- The Los Angeles Museum of the Holocaust (Oro Editions, 2012)
- Hagy Belzberg: structures and metaphors, Carlo Paganelli (L'arca, 2010)
- In-Phil Architecture at the Walt Disney Concert Hall, intro by Joseph Giovannini (Edizioni Press, 2005)
