= List of number-one albums of 2000 (Spain) =

The List of number-one albums of 2000 in Spain is derived from the Top 100 España record chart published weekly by PROMUSICAE (Productores de Música de España), a non-profit organization composed by Spain and multinational record companies. This association tracks record sales (physical and digital) in Spain.

== Albums ==
Week	Chart Date	Album	Artist	Reference
1	January 3	A Mis Niños de 30 Años	Miliki	
2	January 10	All the Way... A Decade of Song	Celine Dion	
3	January 17	Gracias	Tamara	
4	January 24	Gracias	Tamara	
5	January 31	Gracias	Tamara	
6	February 7	Gracias	Tamara	
7	February 14	Gracias	Tamara	
8	February 21	Supernatural	Santana	
9	February 28	Supernatural	Santana	
10	March 6	Supernatural	Santana	
11	March 13	Supernatural	Santana	
12	March 20	Minage	Mónica Naranjo	
13	March 27	Minage	Mónica Naranjo	
14	April 3	Minage	Mónica Naranjo	
15	April 10	Gold	Tom Jones	
16	April 17	Gold	Tom Jones	
17	April 24	Gold	Tom Jones	
18	May 1	Sabor a México	Bertín Osborne	
19	May 8	The Ultimate Collection	Barry White	
20	May 15	Alma Caribeña	Gloria Estefan	
21	May 22	The Ultimate Collection	Barry White	
22	May 29	Simplemente Amor	Camela	
23	June 5	Simplemente Amor	Camela	
24	June 12	Simplemente Amor	Camela	
25	June 19	Noche de Cuatro Lunas	Julio Iglesias	
26	June 26	Noche de Cuatro Lunas	Julio Iglesias	
27	July 3	Noche de Cuatro Lunas	Julio Iglesias	
28	July 10	Noche de Cuatro Lunas	Julio Iglesias	
29	July 17	In Blue	The Corrs	
30	July 24	In Blue	The Corrs	
31	July 31	In Blue	The Corrs	
32	August 7	Estopa	Estopa	
33	August 14	Estopa	Estopa	
34	August 21	Estopa	Estopa	
35	August 28	Estopa	Estopa	
36	September 4	Estopa	Estopa	
37	September 11	El viaje de Copperpot	La Oreja de Van Gogh	
38	September 18	El Alma al Aire	Alejandro Sanz	
39	September 25	El Alma al Aire	Alejandro Sanz	
40	October 2	El Alma al Aire	Alejandro Sanz	
41	October 9	El Alma al Aire	Alejandro Sanz	
42	October 16	El Alma al Aire	Alejandro Sanz	
43	October 23	El Alma al Aire	Alejandro Sanz	
44	October 30	All That You Can't Leave Behind	U2	
45	November 6	All That You Can't Leave Behind	U2	
46	November 13	1	The Beatles	
47	November 20	Black & Blue	Backstreet Boys	
48	November 27	Nos Sobran Los Motivos	Joaquín Sabina	
49	December 4	Estopa	Estopa	
50	December 11	Estopa	Estopa	
51	December 18	Estopa	Estopa	
52	December 25	Estopa	Estopa	

== See also ==
- List of number-one singles of 2000 (Spain)
