= Belzberg Architects =

American architecture and interior design firm

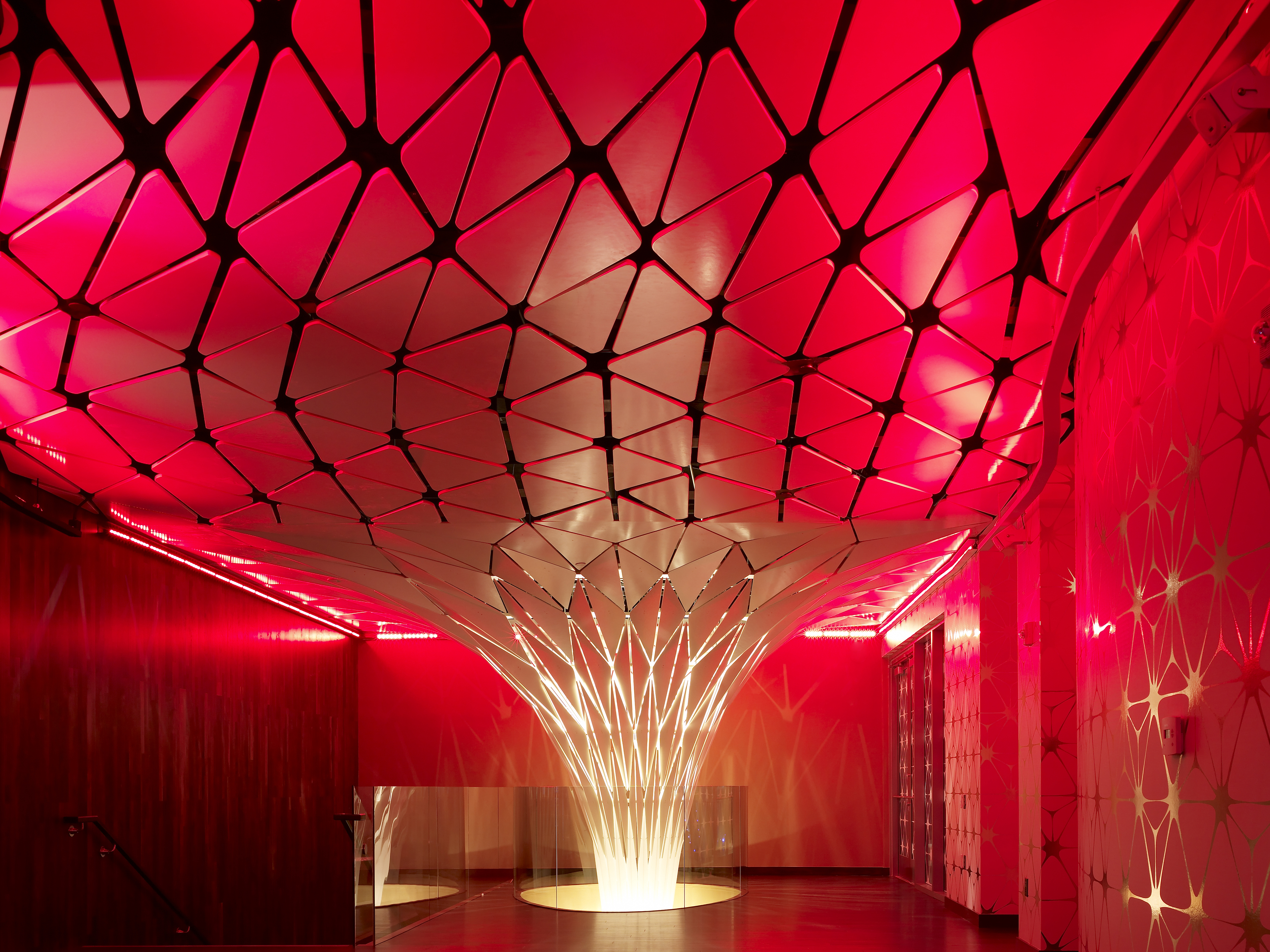
The Conga Room at L.A. Live Designed by Belzberg Architects

Belzberg Architects is an architecture and interior design firm located in the City of Santa Monica, California founded by Hagy Belzberg, FAIA OAA.

== History ==
In 1997, Hagy Belzberg quit his first architecture job (working at Frank O. Gehry and Partners) after only three months to found Belzberg Architects. The firm’s first commission was a house on undeveloped land atop a mountain in Malibu for prolific car collector, Bata Mataja. It was later featured in the 2001 film, The Glass House. Shortly after the completion of the Mataja Residence, the firm was awarded the contract to design a high-end restaurant, café, and Los Angeles Philharmonic gift store located within Gehry’s Walt Disney Concert Hall in downtown Los Angeles, commissions that garnered critical acclaim and international recognition.

Another turning point for the firm was the Los Angeles Museum of the Holocaust in Pan Pacific Park. Completed in 2010, the 32,000sqft subterranean building is certified-LEED-Gold and is one of the few projects that has been the recipient of both the AIA Institute Honor Awards for Architecture and Interior Architecture. Of the project, the juries commented: “The concrete work is beautiful. Although the project is curvilinear in form, the more basic structure is a very rigid grid. Given the nature of this museum’s mission, the experience of it should be unusual, and this design makes it so: The amorphous geometry reinforces the unsettling journey through the museum.” And: “The whole effect is enhanced by the gradients of the light, which are torqued and reflective on the interior of the space.”

Other key projects include The Gores Group headquarters, a commercial office building renovation at the western gateway of Beverly Hills; The Pavilion (2014) at City of Hope National Medical Center in Duarte, a multi-purpose project that marks the institution’s centennial; Skyline Residence (2007) in Laurel Canyon, Los Angeles; and single-family homes in Toronto, Mexico City, Atlanta, and Los Angeles.

In 2014, Cory Taylor, AIA became a partner at the firm.

== Exhibitions ==
In 2007, the Association for Computer-Aided Design in Architecture, Canada featured their work at the Expanding Bodies Conference. As a result, their research and built work was featured in and on the cover of the book Innovation in Building Design + Manufacturing.

In the summer of 2013, Hagy Belzberg and Belzberg Architects were selected to exhibit work at The Museum of Contemporary Art, Los Angeles's "A New Sculpturalism, Contemporary Architecture from Southern California"...

== Awards ==
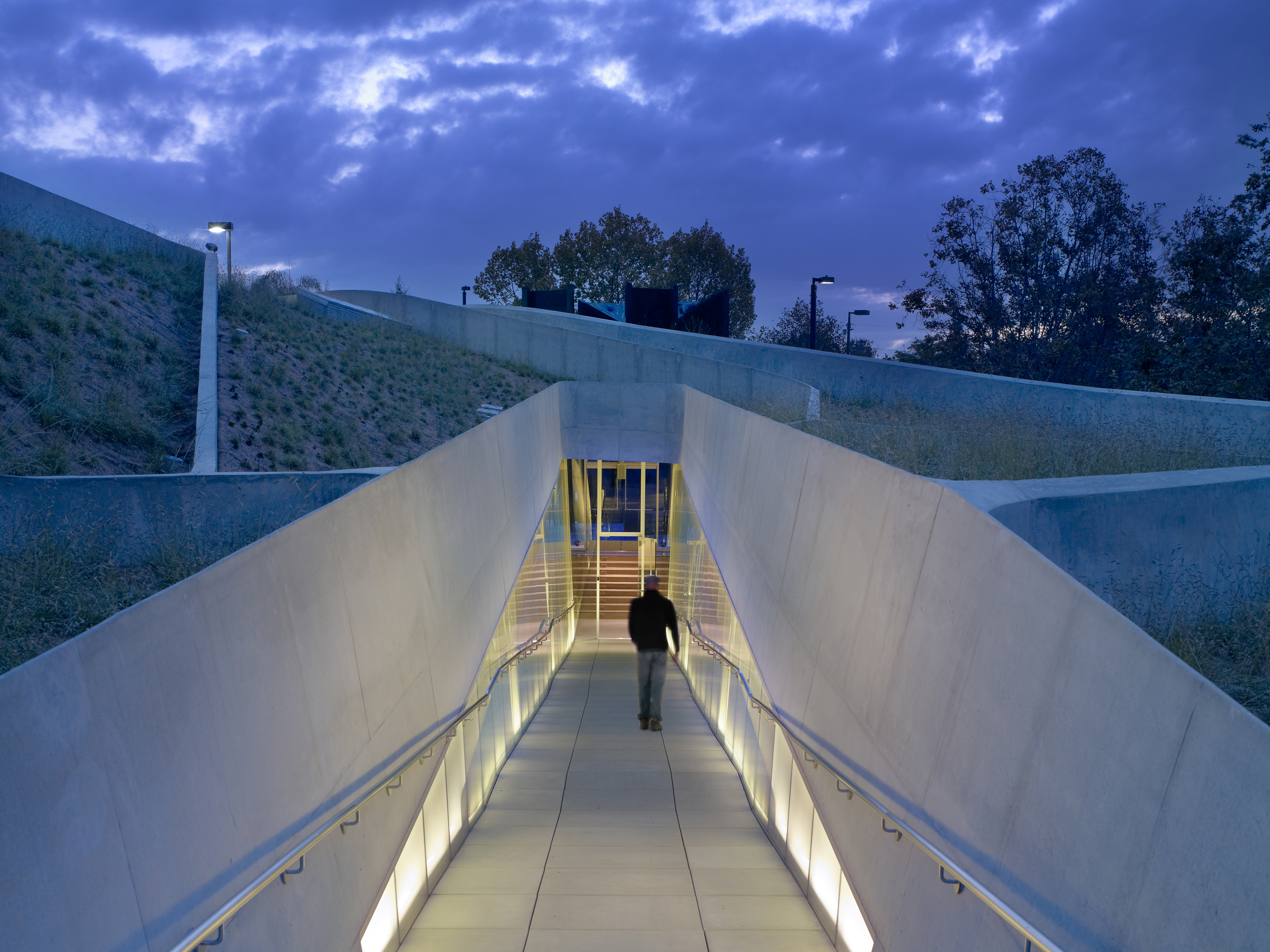
The Los Angeles Museum of the Holocaust Designed by Belzberg Architects

Belzberg Architects earned more than 35 state, national and local design awards including over 15 from the American Institute of Architects. Their work has been featured in over 200 publications throughout more than 25 countries including features in Architectural Record, Interior Design, The New York Times and the Los Angeles Times. In addition, Belzberg Architects has received two Los Angeles Cultural Affairs Committee Design Honor Awards. The Urban Land Institute recognized their design work and their contribution to excellence in urban planning. The Chicago Athenaeum Museum of Architecture recognized several of their projects with American Architecture Awards. In 2008 Belzberg Architects won the prestigious designation of "Emerging Voice" by the Architectural League of New York.
