= Armando Manzanero =

Mexican singer-songwriter and composer (1934–2020)

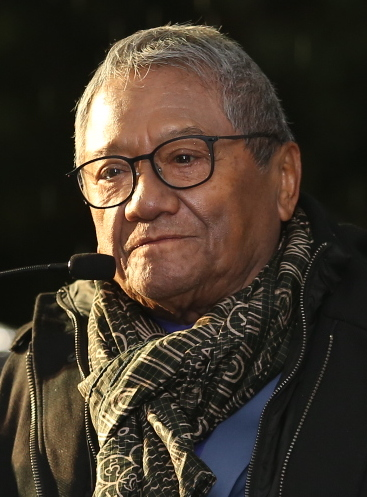
- Manzanero in 2016

Background information
- Born: Armando Manzanero Canché; 7 December 1934; Ticul, Yucatán, Mexico
- Died: 28 December 2020 (aged 86) Mexico City, Mexico
- Genre: Boleros
- Occupations: Composer; pianist; singer
- Instruments: Piano; voice
- Years active: 1950–2020
- Label: RCA Victor

Armando Manzanero Canché (7 December 1934 – 28 December 2020) was a Mexican musician, singer, composer, and music producer, widely considered the premier Mexican romantic composer of the postwar era and one of the most successful composers of Latin America. He received a Grammy Lifetime Achievement Award in the United States in 2014. He was the president of the Mexican Society of Authors and Composers (Sociedad de Autores y Compositores de México).

== Early life ==
Manzanero was born in Mérida, Yucatán on 7 December 1934. (Note: Some sources say 1935, which is the year the birth was registered.) His father was singer and composer Santiago Manzanero and his mother Juanita Canché Baqueiro played the jarana jarocha. At the age of eight he was introduced to the world of music at the Escuela de Bellas Artes (School of Fine Arts), later furthering his musical studies in Mexico City.

== Career ==
In 1950, at the age of fifteen, he composed his first melody titled Nunca en el Mundo (Never in the World), of which twenty-one versions in different languages have been recorded to date. The following year he began his professional career as a pianist.

In 1957 he was signed as musical director by the Mexican branch of CBS International and as Musical Promoter for EMI, becoming the next year the pianist of Latin American artists such as Pedro Vargas, Lucho Gatica and Raphael.

In 1959, an executive of RCA Victor urged him to record his first album of love songs, which he named Mi Primera Grabación (My First Record).

In 1965 he won first place at the Festival de la Canción (Song Festival) in Miami with the song Cuando Estoy Contigo (When I'm With You).

In 1970, his song "Somos Novios" was reissued with new lyrics by Sid Wayne, composer for Elvis Presley. The English version, "It's Impossible", was performed by Perry Como and was nominated for a Grammy.

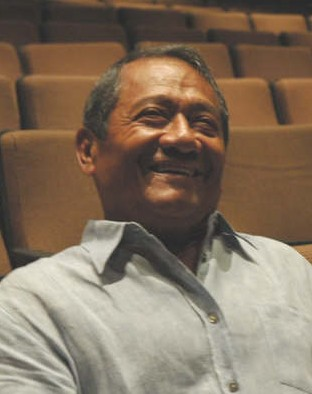
Armando Manzanero in 2010

In 1978 he won first place at the Mallorca Festival in Spain, with the song Señor Amor (Mister Love). In 1982, the song Corazón Amigo (Heart Friend), was honored at the Yamaha Festival. In 1993 Billboard magazine gave him an award for his excellent musical career.

In 2011, Manzanero became President of and one of the main directors of the Asociación Nacional de Autores y Compositores (Mexican National Association of Authors and Composers). He also served as Vice President of the association from 1982 through 2011. His work in defense of copyright laws has strengthened this organization and has given it international acclaim.

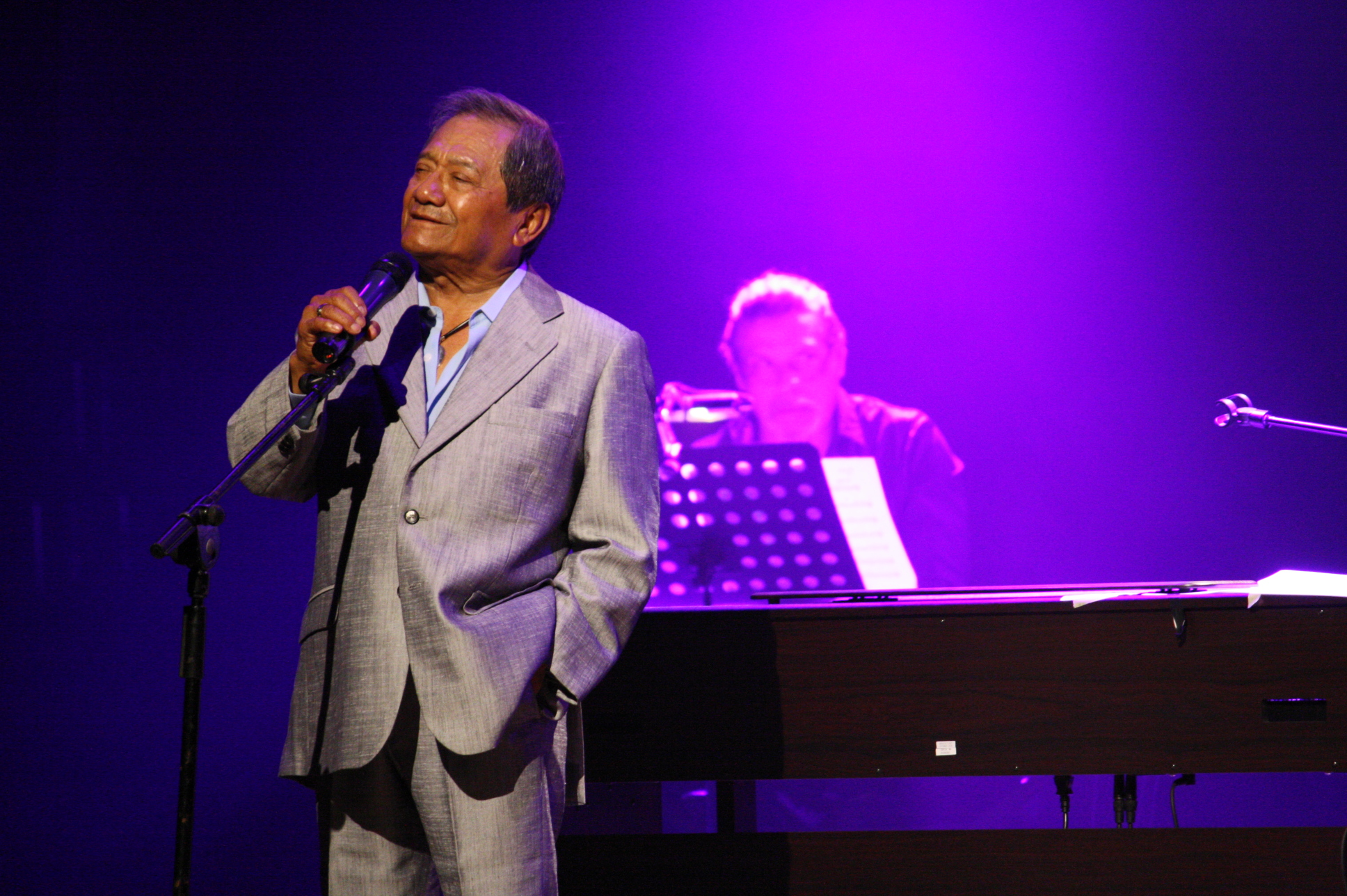
Manzanero in 2010

His work has been performed by singers such as Tito Rodriguez, Frank Sinatra, Elvis Presley, Shirley Bassey, Andrea Bocelli, Raquel Bitton, Tony Bennett, Laura Pausini, Alejandro Fernández, Perry Como, Luis Miguel, Franck Pourcel, Paul Mauriat, Ray Conniff, María Martha Serra Lima, Mina, Claudio Nicoletti, Raphael, Roberto Carlos, Christina Aguilera, Dionne Warwick, Manoella Torres, Marco Antonio Muñiz, Angelica Maria, José José, Tania Libertad, Lucero, Cristian Castro, and Il Divo, Carmen París, as well as with pianist Raúl di Blasio and others.

Manzanero composed more than four hundred songs, fifty of which achieved international fame. He participated in numerous radio and television shows, recorded more than thirty albums, and composed the musical scores of several movies. During the fifty years of his musical career, Manzanero gave performances all over Latin America, particularly in São Paulo (Brazil), Buenos Aires (Argentina), El Metropolitan (Mexico), the Teresa Carreño Theater of Caracas (Venezuela), Madison Square Garden (New York), and many other cities in Europe and Asia.

His most famous songs include Voy a apagar la luz (I'm Going to Turn Off the Lights), Contigo Aprendí (With you I Learned...), Adoro (I Adore), No sé tú (I don't know if you...), Por Debajo de la Mesa (Underneath the Table) Esta Tarde Vi Llover (English version "Yesterday I Heard the Rain"), Somos Novios (English version "It's Impossible"), Felicidad (Happiness) and Nada Personal (Nothing Personal).

Some of his melodies have also been recorded by jazz artists, like Bill Evans, Abbey Lincoln, and Tete Montoliu.

== Death ==
On 17 December 2020, Manzanero was hospitalized in Mexico City after being diagnosed with COVID-19 during the COVID-19 pandemic in Mexico. Manzanero died 11 days later from the virus, aged 85 on 28 December 2020, 21 days after his birthday. His body was cremated and his ashes were transferred to Mérida, in Yucatán where he was born and where there is a house museum in his honor.

== Recognition and legacy ==
Manzanero was presented with the Excellence Award at the 1993 Lo Nuestro Awards. He received the Latin Grammy Lifetime Achievement Award in 2010 as well as the Grammy Lifetime Achievement Award in 2014. Manzanero was inducted into the International Latin Music Hall of Fame in 2000, the Billboard Latin Music Hall of Fame in 2003, and the Latin Songwriters Hall of Fame in 2013. Manzanero was presented with the ASCAP Latin Heritage Award in 2010. He also earned the Billboard Latin Music Lifetime Achievement Award in 2020.

== Selected discography ==
- 1959: Mi Primera Grabación
- 1967: A mi amor... Con mi amor
- 1967: Manzanero el Grande
- 1968: Somos Novios
- 1968: Armando Manzanero, su piano y su música
- 1969: Para mi siempre amor
- N/A: Que bonito viven los enamorados
- 1976: Lo mejor de Armando Manzanero
- 1977: Fanático de ti
- 1977: Corazón Salvaje
- 1979: Ternura y Romance
- 1981: Mi trato contigo
- 1982: Otra vez romántico
- 1985: Armando Manzanero
- 1987: Cariñosamente, Manzanero
- 1988: Mientras existas tú
- 1992: Las canciones que quise escribir
- 1993: Entre amigos
- 1995: El piano... Manzanero y sus amigos
- 1996: Nada Personal
- 1997: Intimos (Ft. Bebu Silvetti)
- 1998: Manzanero y La Libertad (Ft. Tania Libertad)
- 2001: Duetos
- 2002: Duetos 2
- 2002: Lo Mejor de lo Mejor
- 2005: Lo Esencial
- 2006: De la A a la Z (Ft. Susana Zabaleta)-DVD
- 2008: Las mujeres de Manzanero
- 2009: Amarrados (Ft. Susana Zabaleta)
- 2012: "Armando un Pancho" (Dueto – Francisco Cespedes)
- 2014: "Des Armando a Tania" (Dueto – Tania Libertad)

== See also ==
- List of Mexican singer-songwriters
