= Romances Tour =

1997–98 concert tour by Luis Miguel

- Tour by Luis Miguel
- Associated album: Romances; Todos Los Romances
- Start date: September 12, 1997
- End date: May 13, 1998
- Legs: 2
- No. of shows: 61 in North America; 9 in South America; 9 in Europe; 79 total

Luis Miguel concert chronology
- America Tour (1996); Romances Tour (1997–98); Amarte Es Un Placer Tour (1999–2000)

The Romances Tour was a concert tour performed by Luis Miguel during the years 1997 and 1998 to promote his new album Romances. To present this album, two press conferences were held, one at the Rainbow Room in New York City and another at the Casino de Madrid, Spain.

On this tour, Luis Miguel perform his last back-catalogue and also his last pop songs. Pollstar mentioned this tour as one of the Top 20 All-Time Grossing, and one of the 20 artists that most tickets have sold in one same scenario in the history of the music. The tour consisted of 79 concerts and was attended by approximately 1 million fans.

== History ==
This tour began in September in United States where he made a total of 9 concerts in Las Vegas and Los Angeles.

Then in October he began his concert season in Mexico, specifically in Monterrey and Mexico City.

In November he travels to South America (Argentina and Chile) then to Puerto Rico and then begins an extensive series of concerts by United States in the following cities: Orlando, Miami, San Antonio, El Paso, San Diego, Tucson, Houston, South Padre, New York, Rosemont, Fairfax, Atlantic City, Anaheim, Los Angeles, Phoenix, San Jose, Sacramento and Las Vegas for a total of 32 concerts.

Then in the month of May close the tour in Spain (country to which returns after 6 years of absence since its presentation at the Seville Expo '92) with 9 concerts.

== Critical reception ==
The performances featured Miguel performing dance-pop and bolero arrangements for two-and-a-half hours. Adam Sandler of Variety expressed a mixed reaction to the concert in the Universal Amphitheatre in Los Angeles. He noted that Miguel rarely acknowledged his audience or ventured out from center stage. Robert Hilburn of the Los Angeles Times had a more positive reaction, which he described as a "marvelously designed and wonderfully executed blend of Latin music tradition". Another Times contributor, Ernesto Lechner, wrote that Miguel's bolero performance at the Arrowhead Pond arena in California "brought the house down" and stated that the experience at the concert was "pretty close" to Beatlemania. In New York City, Miguel performed five consecutive shows in the Radio City Music Hall. In Mexico City he performed seventeen consecutive concerts in the National Auditorium, where it was the highest-grossing concert by a Latin artist that year. The tour also traveled to South America; including Chile, and Argentina; and continued until May 1998, when Miguel performed throughout Spain. Miguel was the first Latin artist to be inducted to the Pollstar "Top 20 All-Time Grossing Tours" for most tickets sold for consecutive concerts at one venue in 1997.

== Set list ==
This set list is from the September 12, 1997, concert in Las Vegas. It does not represent all dates throughout the tour.

1. "Si Te Vas"
2. "Que Tú Te Vas"
3. Up-tempo Medley:
  - "Un Hombre Busca Una Mujer"
  - "Cuestión De Piel"
  - "Oro De Ley"
4. Ballads Medley:
  - "Yo Que No Vivo Sin Ti"
  - "Amante Del Amor"
  - "Culpable O No"
  - "Mas Allá de Todo"
  - "Fría Como el Viento"
  - "Entrégate"
  - "Tengo Todo Excepto a Ti"
  - "Hoy El Aire Huele A Ti"
  - "La Incondicional"
5. "Todo Por Su Amor"
6. "Tú y Yo"
7. "Voy a Apagar la Luz / Contigo Aprendí"
8. "La Gloria Eres Tú"
9. "Encadenados"
10. "El Reloj"
11. "De Quererte Así"
12. "Somos Novios"
13. "Sabor a Mí"
14. "El Día Que Me Quieras"
15. "Uno"
16. "Inolvidable"
17. "No Sé Tú"
18. "Por Debajo de la Mesa"
19. "Nosotros"
20. "Bésame Mucho"
21. "La Media Vuelta"
22. "Y"
23. "Que Seas Feliz"
24. "Échame A Mí La Culpa"
25. "Mi Ciudad"
26. "La Bikina"
27. "Sueña"
28. "Dame"
29. "Suave"
  Encore
30. "Como Es Posible Que A Mi Lado"
31. "Será Que No Me Amas"
32. "Cuando Calienta El Sol"

Notes

- "Contigo (Estar Contigo)" was performed on the first Miami show.
- "De Quererte Así" and "Inolvidable" were performed only on selected dates.
- "Un Mundo Raro" was performed in San Diego, on the Mariachi section.
- "La Media Vuelta" and "Mi Ciudad" were the only two Mariachi songs sung in all the concerts of the tour. The rest of Mariachi's songs were performed on selected dates.
- In the Spain tour the Mariachi section was excluded.

== Tour dates ==
List of concerts, showing date, city, country, venue, tickets sold, number of available tickets and amount of gross revenue
Date	City	Country	Venue	Attendance	Revenue
North America
September 12, 1997	Las Vegas	United States	Circus Maximus Showroom	—N/a	—N/a
September 13, 1997	Las Vegas	United States	Circus Maximus Showroom	—N/a	—N/a
September 14, 1997	Las Vegas	United States	Circus Maximus Showroom	—N/a	—N/a
September 15, 1997	Las Vegas	United States	Circus Maximus Showroom	—N/a	—N/a
September 18, 1997	Los Angeles	United States	Universal Amphitheatre	30,263 / 30,263	$1,655,588
September 19, 1997	Los Angeles	United States	Universal Amphitheatre	30,263 / 30,263	$1,655,588
September 20, 1997	Los Angeles	United States	Universal Amphitheatre	30,263 / 30,263	$1,655,588
September 21, 1997	Los Angeles	United States	Universal Amphitheatre	30,263 / 30,263	$1,655,588
September 22, 1997	Los Angeles	United States	Universal Amphitheatre	30,263 / 30,263	$1,655,588
October 2, 1997	Monterrey	Mexico	Auditorio Coca-Cola	—N/a	—N/a
October 3, 1997	Monterrey	Mexico	Auditorio Coca-Cola	—N/a	—N/a
October 4, 1997	Monterrey	Mexico	Auditorio Coca-Cola	—N/a	—N/a
October 5, 1997	Monterrey	Mexico	Auditorio Coca-Cola	—N/a	—N/a
October 9, 1997	Mexico City	Mexico	National Auditorium	159,878 / 166,617	$6,766,366
October 10, 1997	Mexico City	Mexico	National Auditorium	159,878 / 166,617	$6,766,366
October 11, 1997	Mexico City	Mexico	National Auditorium	159,878 / 166,617	$6,766,366
October 12, 1997	Mexico City	Mexico	National Auditorium	159,878 / 166,617	$6,766,366
October 16, 1997	Mexico City	Mexico	National Auditorium	159,878 / 166,617	$6,766,366
October 17, 1997	Mexico City	Mexico	National Auditorium	159,878 / 166,617	$6,766,366
October 18, 1997	Mexico City	Mexico	National Auditorium	159,878 / 166,617	$6,766,366
October 19, 1997	Mexico City	Mexico	National Auditorium	159,878 / 166,617	$6,766,366
October 23, 1997	Mexico City	Mexico	National Auditorium	159,878 / 166,617	$6,766,366
October 24, 1997	Mexico City	Mexico	National Auditorium	159,878 / 166,617	$6,766,366
October 25, 1997	Mexico City	Mexico	National Auditorium	159,878 / 166,617	$6,766,366
October 26, 1997	Mexico City	Mexico	National Auditorium	159,878 / 166,617	$6,766,366
October 29, 1997	Mexico City	Mexico	National Auditorium	159,878 / 166,617	$6,766,366
October 30, 1997	Mexico City	Mexico	National Auditorium	159,878 / 166,617	$6,766,366
October 31, 1997	Mexico City	Mexico	National Auditorium	159,878 / 166,617	$6,766,366
November 1, 1997	Mexico City	Mexico	National Auditorium	159,878 / 166,617	$6,766,366
November 2, 1997	Mexico City	Mexico	National Auditorium	159,878 / 166,617	$6,766,366
South America
November 6, 1997	Santiago	Chile	Estadio San Carlos de Apoquindo	—N/a	—N/a
November 7, 1997	Santiago	Chile	Estadio San Carlos de Apoquindo	—N/a	—N/a
November 9, 1997	Viña del Mar	Chile	Quinta Vergara Amphitheater	—N/a	—N/a
November 14, 1997	Buenos Aires	Argentina	Estadio Velez Sarsfield	—N/a	—N/a
November 15, 1997	Buenos Aires	Argentina	Estadio Velez Sarsfield	—N/a	—N/a
November 16, 1997	Buenos Aires	Argentina	Estadio Velez Sarsfield	—N/a	—N/a
November 18, 1997	Rosario	Argentina	Estadio Gigante de Arroyito	—N/a	—N/a
November 20, 1997	Córdoba	Argentina	Estadio Chateau Carreras	—N/a	—N/a
North America II
November 26, 1997	San Juan	Puerto Rico	Roberto Clemente Coliseum	—N/a	—N/a
November 29, 1997	Orlando	United States	Orlando Arena	—N/a	—N/a
December 3, 1997	San Antonio	United States	Alamodome	—N/a	—N/a
December 5, 1997	El Paso	United States	Don Haskins Center	—N/a	—N/a
December 6, 1997	El Paso	United States	Don Haskins Center	—N/a	—N/a
December 9, 1997	San Diego	United States	San Diego Sports Arena	—N/a	$641,620
December 10, 1997	San Diego	United States	San Diego Sports Arena	—N/a	$641,620
January 30, 1998	Tucson	United States	TCC Arena	—N/a	—N/a
February 2, 1998	Houston	United States	Compaq Center	—N/a	—N/a
February 3, 1998	South Padre Island	United States	SP Convention Center	—N/a	—N/a
February 4, 1998	South Padre Island	United States	SP Convention Center	—N/a	—N/a
February 7, 1998 (Note: The February 7, 1998 concert at Miami Arena in Miami was originally scheduled to take place on November 30, 1997, but was postponed due "delays in transportation".)	Miami	United States	Miami Arena	—N/a	—N/a
February 8, 1998	Miami	United States	Miami Arena	—N/a	—N/a
February 11, 1998	New York City	United States	Radio City Music Hall	—N/a	—N/a
February 12, 1998	New York City	United States	Radio City Music Hall	—N/a	—N/a
February 13, 1998	New York City	United States	Radio City Music Hall	—N/a	—N/a
February 14, 1998	New York City	United States	Radio City Music Hall	—N/a	—N/a
February 15, 1998	New York City	United States	Radio City Music Hall	—N/a	—N/a
February 17, 1998	Rosemont	United States	Rosemont Horizon	10,852 / 10,852	$624,103
February 19, 1998	Fairfax	United States	Patriot Center	—N/a	—N/a
February 21, 1998	Atlantic City	United States	Mark G. Etess Arena	—N/a	—N/a
February 26, 1998	Anaheim	United States	Arrowhead Pond	—N/a	—N/a
February 28, 1998	Los Angeles	United States	Universal Amphitheatre	6,044 / 6,044	$325,520
March 1, 1998	Phoenix	United States	America West Arena	6,122 / 12,447	$330,031
March 6, 1998	Fresno	United States	Selland Arena	5,626 / 7,073	$246,945
March 7, 1998	San Jose	United States	San Jose Arena	11,301 / 11,301	$557,545
March 8, 1998	Sacramento	United States	Memorial Auditorium	3,061 / 3,500	$204,895
March 9, 1998	Sacramento	United States	Memorial Auditorium	—N/a	—N/a
April 9, 1998	Las Vegas	United States	Circus Maximus Showroom	—N/a	—N/a
April 10, 1998	Las Vegas	United States	Circus Maximus Showroom	—N/a	—N/a
April 11, 1998	Las Vegas	United States	Circus Maximus Showroom	—N/a	—N/a
April 12, 1998	Las Vegas	United States	Circus Maximus Showroom	—N/a	—N/a
Europe
May 1, 1998	Madrid	Spain	Palacio de Congresos	—N/a	—N/a
May 2, 1998	Madrid	Spain	Palacio de Congresos	—N/a	—N/a
May 3, 1998	Madrid	Spain	Palacio de Congresos	—N/a	—N/a
May 4, 1998	Madrid	Spain	Palacio de Congresos	—N/a	—N/a
May 8, 1998	Málaga	Spain	Plaza de toros de La Malagueta	12,000	—N/a
May 9, 1998	Murcia	Spain	Plaza de Toros de Murcia	—N/a	—N/a
May 10, 1998	Valencia	Spain	Velódromo Luis Puig	10,400	—N/a
May 12, 1998	Barcelona	Spain	Palau Sant Jordi	16,418	—N/a
May 13, 1998	Madrid	Spain	Palacio de Deportes	—N/a	—N/a
79 Concerts	32 cities	6 countries	33 venues	233,147 / 242,181 (96%)	$10,653,467

- The second Santiago show was partially recorded for its transmission in Chile by UC13.*
- The second Buenos Aires show was partially recorded for its transmission in Argentina by Canal 13.

== Cancelled shows ==
List of cancelled concerts, showing date, city, country, venue, and reason for cancellation
Date	City	Country	Venue	Reason
September 25, 1997	Santa Barbara	United States	Santa Barbara Bowl	Illness
September 26, 1997	San Diego	United States	San Diego Sports Arena	Illness
September 27, 1997	San Diego	United States	San Diego Sports Arena	Illness
September 30, 1997	Dallas	United States	Starplex Amphitheatre	Illness
November 23, 1997	Caracas	Venezuela	—	Unknown
November 30, 1997	Miami	United States	Miami Arena	Delays in transportation
January 31, 1998	Albuquerque	United States	Tingley Coliseum	Poor ticket sales
April 4, 1998	Dallas	United States	Starplex Amphitheatre	Scheduling conflict

== Band ==
- Luis Miguel – vocals
- Kiko Cibrian – guitar (1997)
- Todd Robinson – guitar (1998)
- Francisco Loyo – piano, keyboards
- Victor Loyo – drums
- Gerardo Carrillo – bass
- Tommy Aros – percussion
- Arturo Pérez – keyboards
- Jeff Nathanson – saxophone
- Francisco Abonce – trumpet
- Juan Arpero – trumpet
- Alejandro Carballo – trombone
- Antonio González – requinto
- Shana Wall – backing vocals (1997)
- Francis Benitez – backing vocals (1997)
- Sara LaPorte – backing vocals (1997)
- Alice – backing vocals (1998)
- Unique – backing vocals (1998)

Source.
