= America Tour =

1996 concert tour by Luis Miguel

- Tour by Luis Miguel
- Location: South America
- Associated album: Nada Es Igual...
- Start date: November 19, 1996
- End date: December 15, 1996
- Legs: 1
- No. of shows: 12

Luis Miguel concert chronology
- El Concierto Tour (1995); America Tour (1996); Romances Tour (1997–98)

America Tour 1996 (also known as the Nada Es Igual Tour) was a short concert tour performed by Luis Miguel during the last part of 1996 to promote his album Nada Es Igual... It only lasted for one month and it only took place at some places in South America, like Buenos Aires, Argentina in the River Plate Stadium, Santiago de Chile, Uruguay, Peru, Paraguay, Ecuador and Brazil.

== Set list ==
This set list is from the December 7, 1996, concert in Buenos Aires. It does not represent all dates throughout the tour.

1. "Dame Tú Amor"
2. "Me Niego A Estar Solo"
3. Up-tempo Medley:
  - "Un Hombre Busca Una Mujer"
  - "Cuestión De Piel"
  - "Oro De Ley"
4. Ballads Medley:
  - "Yo Que No Vivo Sin Ti"
  - "Culpable O No"
  - "Mas Allá de Todo"
  - "Fría Como el Viento"
  - "Entrégate"
  - "Tengo Todo Excepto a Ti"
  - "La Incondicional"
5. "Si Te Vas"
6. "Hasta El Fin"
7. "Always And Forever Intro" (Pat Metheny cover)
8. "Todo y Nada"
9. "No Sé Tú"
10. "No Me Platiques Más"
11. "La Barca"
12. "Nosotros"
13. "El Día Que Me Quieras"
14. "Intro (Saxophone) - Que Nivel De Mujer"
15. "Sueña"
16. "Come Fly With Me" (feat. Frank Sinatra)
17. "Dame"
18. "La Media Vuelta"
19. "Amanecí En Tus Brazos"
20. "Si Nos Dejan"
21. "Suave"
  Encore
22. "Como Es Posible Que A Mi Lado"
23. "Será Que No Me Amas"

== Tour dates ==
List of concerts, showing date, city, country and venue
Date	City	Country	Venue
South America
November 19, 1996	Lima	Peru	Estadio Municipal Miraflores
November 22, 1996	Quito	Ecuador	Estadio Olímpico Atahualpa
November 25, 1996	Rio de Janeiro	Brazil	Metropolitan
November 26, 1996	São Paulo	Brazil	Olympia
November 27, 1996	São Paulo	Brazil	Olympia
November 30, 1996	Santiago	Chile	Estadio Nacional de Chile
December 3, 1996	Asunción	Paraguay	Estadio Defensores del Chaco
December 7, 1996	Buenos Aires	Argentina	River Plate Stadium
December 8, 1996 (Note: The December 8, 1996 concert at River Plate Stadium in Buenos Aires was originally scheduled to take place on December 6, 1996, but was postponed due to "Heavy rains".)	Buenos Aires	Argentina	River Plate Stadium
December 10, 1996	Montevideo	Uruguay	Estadio Centenario
December 13, 1996	Córdoba	Argentina	Estadio Chateau Carreras
December 15, 1996	Rosario	Argentina	Estadio Gigante de Arroyito
12 Concerts	10 cities	7 countries	10 venues

- The Santiago show was fully recorded for its partial transmission in Chile by Megavisión.
- The second Buenos Aires show was fully recorded for its transmission in Argentina by Telefe.

== Cancelled shows ==
List of cancelled concerts, showing date, city, country, venue, and reason for cancellation
Date	City	Country	Venue	Reason
November 29, 1996	Santiago	Chile	Estadio San Carlos de Apoquindo	Delays in transportation

== Band ==
- Vocals: Luis Miguel
- Acoustic & electric guitar: Kiko Cibrian
- Bass: Lalo Carrillo
- Piano: Francisco Loyo
- Keyboards: Arturo Pérez
- Drums: Victor Loyo
- Percussion: Tommy Aros
- Saxophone: Jeff Nathanson
- Saxophone: Cleto Escobedo
- Trumpet: Francisco Abonce
- Trombone: Alejandro Carballo
- Trombone: Victor Potenza
- Backing vocals: Hannah Mancini, Sandra Allen
