= Segundo Romance Tour =

1994 concert tour by Luis Miguel

- Tour by Luis Miguel
- Associated album: Segundo Romance
- Start date: August 4, 1994
- End date: December 31, 1994
- Legs: 1
- No. of shows: 54 in North America; 12 in South America; 68 total

Luis Miguel concert chronology
- Aries Tour (1993–94); Segundo Romance Tour (1994); El Concierto Tour (1995)

The Segundo Romance Tour was a concert tour performed by Luis Miguel during the last part of 1994 to promote his last album. He began the tour in Mexico before the official release of Segundo Romance, performing the new songs of the album on the 16 sold-out concerts at the National Auditorium in Mexico City.

The tour consisted of well over 1 million people attending his shows, of which 25 performances were throughout major cities in the United States, most of them sold out.

== History ==
To promote the album, Miguel began his Segundo Romance Tour in August 1994 with 16 shows at the National Auditorium in Mexico City, which drew an audience of more than 155,000. Miguel performed throughout Mexico, the United States and Argentina until December 31, 1994, when the tour concluded in Acapulco. The first part of Miguel's set list featured pop songs and contemporary ballads; during the second half he sang boleros from Segundo Romance and ranchera songs, before closing with "Será Que No Me Amas", the Spanish version of the Jackson 5's "Blame It on the Boogie".

In October 1995, Warner Music released the El Concierto live album and video, a compilation of Miguel's performances at the National Auditorium in Mexico City and his concert at the José Amalfitani Stadium in Buenos Aires. Stephen Thomas Erlewine of AllMusic praised its production and Miguel's performance.

== Set list ==
This set list is from the August 28, 1994, concert in Mexico City. It does not represent all dates throughout the tour.

1. "Luz Verde"
2. "América, América"
3. "Pensar En Ti"
4. "Dame Tú Amor"
5. "No Sé Tú"
6. "Alguien Como Tú" (Somebody in Your Life)
7. Ballads Medley:
  - "Yo Que No Vivo Sin Ti"
  - "Culpable O No"
  - "Mas Allá de Todo"
  - "Fría Como el Viento"
  - "Entrégate"
  - "Tengo Todo Excepto a Ti"
  - "La Incondicional"
8. "Suave"
9. "Hasta Que Me Olvides"
10. "Interlude" (band)
11. "Que Nivel De Mujer" (Attitude Dance)
12. "Historia De Un Amor"
13. "Nosotros"
14. "Como Yo Te Amé"
15. "Somos Novios"
16. "Sin Ti"
17. "El Día Que Me Quieras"
18. "La Media Vuelta"
19. "Si Nos Dejan"
20. "De Que Manera Te Olvido"
21. "El Rey"
22. "Será Que No Me Amas"

== Tour dates ==
List of concerts, showing date, city, country, venue, tickets sold, number of available tickets and amount of gross revenue
Date	City	Country	Venue	Attendance	Revenue
North America
August 4, 1994	Mexico City	Mexico	Auditorio Nacional	150,000 / 150,000	$5,543,982
August 5, 1994	Mexico City	Mexico	Auditorio Nacional	150,000 / 150,000	$5,543,982
August 6, 1994	Mexico City	Mexico	Auditorio Nacional	150,000 / 150,000	$5,543,982
August 7, 1994	Mexico City	Mexico	Auditorio Nacional	150,000 / 150,000	$5,543,982
August 11, 1994	Mexico City	Mexico	Auditorio Nacional	150,000 / 150,000	$5,543,982
August 12, 1994	Mexico City	Mexico	Auditorio Nacional	150,000 / 150,000	$5,543,982
August 13, 1994	Mexico City	Mexico	Auditorio Nacional	150,000 / 150,000	$5,543,982
August 14, 1994	Mexico City	Mexico	Auditorio Nacional	150,000 / 150,000	$5,543,982
August 18, 1994	Mexico City	Mexico	Auditorio Nacional	150,000 / 150,000	$5,543,982
August 19, 1994	Mexico City	Mexico	Auditorio Nacional	150,000 / 150,000	$5,543,982
August 20, 1994	Mexico City	Mexico	Auditorio Nacional	150,000 / 150,000	$5,543,982
August 24, 1994	Mexico City	Mexico	Auditorio Nacional	150,000 / 150,000	$5,543,982
August 25, 1994	Mexico City	Mexico	Auditorio Nacional	150,000 / 150,000	$5,543,982
August 26, 1994	Mexico City	Mexico	Auditorio Nacional	150,000 / 150,000	$5,543,982
August 27, 1994	Mexico City	Mexico	Auditorio Nacional	150,000 / 150,000	$5,543,982
August 28, 1994	Mexico City	Mexico	Auditorio Nacional	150,000 / 150,000	$5,543,982
September 2, 1994	Dallas	United States	Fort Worth Convention Center	—N/a	—N/a
September 3, 1994	San Antonio	United States	HemisFair Arena	—N/a	—N/a
September 4, 1994	Houston	United States	Astroarena	—N/a	—N/a
September 6, 1994	El Paso	United States	Special Events Center	—N/a	—N/a
September 8, 1994	San Diego	United States	Civic Theatre	—N/a	—N/a
September 9, 1994	San Diego	United States	Civic Theatre	—N/a	—N/a
September 10, 1994	San Diego	United States	Civic Theatre	—N/a	—N/a
September 11, 1994	San Diego	United States	Civic Theatre	—N/a	—N/a
September 14, 1994	Las Vegas	United States	Circus Maximus Showroom	—N/a	—N/a
September 15, 1994	Las Vegas	United States	Circus Maximus Showroom	—N/a	—N/a
September 16, 1994	Las Vegas	United States	Circus Maximus Showroom	—N/a	—N/a
September 17, 1994	Las Vegas	United States	Circus Maximus Showroom	—N/a	—N/a
September 18, 1994	Las Vegas	United States	Circus Maximus Showroom	—N/a	—N/a
September 22, 1994	Los Angeles	United States	Universal Amphitheatre	—N/a	—N/a
September 23, 1994	Los Angeles	United States	Universal Amphitheatre	—N/a	—N/a
September 24, 1994	Los Angeles	United States	Universal Amphitheatre	—N/a	—N/a
September 25, 1994	Los Angeles	United States	Universal Amphitheatre	—N/a	—N/a
September 28, 1994	San Juan	Puerto Rico	Caribe Hilton Hotel	—N/a	—N/a
September 30, 1994	Ponce	Puerto Rico	Estadio Francisco Montaner	—N/a	—N/a
October 1, 1994	San Juan	Puerto Rico	Coliseo Roberto Clemente	—N/a	—N/a
October 2, 1994	San Juan	Puerto Rico	Coliseo Roberto Clemente	—N/a	—N/a
October 6, 1994	Miami	United States	James L. Knight Center	12,533 / 12,533	$487,498
October 7, 1994	Miami	United States	James L. Knight Center	12,533 / 12,533	$487,498
October 8, 1994	Miami	United States	James L. Knight Center	12,533 / 12,533	$487,498
October 13, 1994	New York City	United States	Radio City Music Hall	23,109 / 23,109	$1,319,443
October 14, 1994	New York City	United States	Radio City Music Hall	23,109 / 23,109	$1,319,443
October 15, 1994	New York City	United States	Radio City Music Hall	23,109 / 23,109	$1,319,443
October 16, 1994	New York City	United States	Radio City Music Hall	23,109 / 23,109	$1,319,443
October 22, 1994	Chicago	United States	UIC Pavilion	—N/a	—N/a
October 23, 1994	Oakland	United States	County Coliseum Arena	—N/a	—N/a
October 26, 1994	Laredo	United States	Civic Center	—N/a	—N/a
October 28, 1994	Monterrey	Mexico	Auditorio Fundidora	—N/a	—N/a
October 29, 1994	Monterrey	Mexico	Auditorio Fundidora	—N/a	—N/a
October 30, 1994	Monterrey	Mexico	Auditorio Fundidora	—N/a	—N/a
November 4, 1994	Puebla	Mexico	Estadio de Béisbol Hermanos Serdán	—N/a	—N/a
South America
November 9, 1994	Buenos Aires	Argentina	Centro Costa Salguero	—N/a	—N/a
November 10, 1994	Buenos Aires	Argentina	José Amalfitani Stadium	—N/a	—N/a
November 11, 1994	Buenos Aires	Argentina	José Amalfitani Stadium	—N/a	—N/a
November 15, 1994	Salta	Argentina	Estadio El Gigante del Norte	—N/a	—N/a
November 17, 1994	Tucumán	Argentina	Estadio Monumental José Fierro	—N/a	—N/a
November 20, 1994	Mendoza	Argentina	Estadio Malvinas Argentinas	—N/a	—N/a
November 23, 1994	Córdoba	Argentina	Estadio Chateau Carreras	—N/a	—N/a
November 25, 1994	Rosario	Argentina	Estadio Gigante de Arroyito	—N/a	—N/a
November 27, 1994	La Rioja	Argentina	Estadio Vargas	—N/a	—N/a
November 30, 1994	Santa Fe	Argentina	Estadio 15 de Abril	—N/a	—N/a
December 2, 1994	Mar del Plata	Argentina	Estadio Mundialista	—N/a	—N/a
December 5, 1994	Corrientes	Argentina	Estadio Club Huracán	—N/a	—N/a
North America II
December 15, 1994	Mexico City	Mexico	Centro Espectáculos Premier	—N/a	—N/a
December 16, 1994	Mexico City	Mexico	Centro Espectáculos Premier	—N/a	—N/a
December 17, 1994	Mexico City	Mexico	Centro Espectáculos Premier	—N/a	—N/a
December 30, 1994	Acapulco	Mexico	Centro de Convenciones	—N/a	—N/a
December 31, 1994	Acapulco	Mexico	Centro de Convenciones	—N/a	—N/a
68 Concerts	29 cities	4 countries	31 venues	185,642 / 185,642 (100%)	$7,350,923

- Note: Some dates and venues are missing due to the lack of reliable sources.

== Tour personnel ==
Band

- Luis Miguel – vocals
- Kiko Cibrian – musical director, acoustic guitar, electric guitar
- Gerardo Carrillo – bass
- Victor Loyo – drums
- Francisco Loyo – piano, keyboards
- Arturo Pérez – keyboards
- Leonardo López – percussion, chorus
- Juan Manuel Arpero – trumpet
- Armando Cedillo – trumpet
- Alejandro Carballo – trombone
- Jeff Nathanson – saxofone
- Coco Potenza – bandoneon
- Armando Manzanero – grand piano (selected dates)
- Patricia Tanus – backing vocals
- Fedra Vargas – backing vocals
- Ana Espina Salinas – backing vocals
- Mariachi 2000
