= Nada Es Igual (Luis Miguel album) =

Nada Es Igual...

Studio album by Luis Miguel
- Released: 20 August 1996
- Recorded: February 1996
- Studios: Record Plant Studios (Hollywood, California)
- Genres: Pop; R&B
- Length: 41:22
- Language: Spanish
- Label: WEA Latina
- Producers: Luis Miguel; Kiko Cibrian; Walter Afanasieff

Luis Miguel chronology
El Concierto (1995)	Nada Es Igual... (1996)	Romances (1997)

Singles from Nada Es Igual...
- 1. "Dame" Released: 15 July 1996; 2. "Cómo Es Posible Que a Mi Lado" Released: 1996; 3. "Que Tú Te Vas" Released: 1996

Nada Es Igual (English: Nothing Is the Same) is the eleventh studio album by Mexican recording artist Luis Miguel. It was released by WEA Latina on 20 August 1996. The album has a musical style similar to his previous pop album Aries (1993) on which Miguel performs power ballads and R&B tunes. Recording took place at the Record Plant Studios in February 1996, with production handled by Miguel and his longtime associate Kiko Cibrian. Its songwriting was assisted by Cibrian, Rudy Pérez, and Alejandro Lerner. The album was promoted by three singles: "Dame", "Cómo Es Posible Que a Mi Lado", and "Que Tú Te Vas"; the former became the most successful single reaching number two and number one on the Billboard Hot Latin Songs and Latin Pop Songs charts, respectively. To further promote the recording, Miguel launched the Tour America 1996 where he performed in several South American countries.

Upon its release, Nada Es Igual was met with unfavorable reviews from music critics. While Miguel's vocals and the production of the album were praised, it was heavily scrutinized by music critics for being too similar to his previous pop recordings. Miguel received several accolades for the record including a Grammy nomination for Best Latin Pop Performance. It peaked at number one in Argentina and on the Billboard Top Latin Albums chart in the United States, while receiving multi-platinum and gold certifications by the Argentine Chamber of Phonograms and Videograms Producers (CAPIF) and Recording Industry Association of America (RIAA), respectively. It also reached number two in Spain and was certified double platinum there by the Productores de Música de España (PROMUSICAE). The album has sold over 3 million copies worldwide.

== Background ==
In 1994 Miguel released his tenth studio album, Segundo Romance. It is the follow-up to his 1991 album Romance which contains a collection of classic boleros and Latin American standards. Both Romance and Segundo Romance received a platinum certification by the Recording Industry Association of America (RIAA) in the United States. They were also successful in countries outside of Latin America and the United States, such as Finland and Saudi Arabia, selling over twelve million copies combined. A year after Segundo Romance's release, Warner Music released the El Concierto live album and video, a compilation of Miguel's performances at the National Auditorium in Mexico City, and his concert at the José Amalfitani Stadium in Buenos Aires during his Segundo Romance Tour.

Nada Es Igual is a departure from romance-themed albums. It is his first pop album to be recorded since Aries in 1993, which Achy Obejas of the Chicago Tribune described as "an eclectic pop mix that tried too hard to be edgy, nonetheless continued the reshaping of the Luis Miguel image." The album was announced by Miguel's record label Warner Music Mexico on the same day its lead single "Dame" was revealed on 12 July 1996. The album was produced by Miguel and his longtime associate Kiko Cibrian (who also co-produced his previous three albums) and recorded at the Record Plant in Los Angeles, California. Warner Music also confirmed that Cibrian, Alejandro Lerner, Manuel Alejandro, and Rudy Pérez would assist with the compositions for the record. Miguel and Cibrian spent a total of over 100 hours in February 1996, recording in the studio.

== Composition ==
Luis Miguel "Dame"
A 29-second sample of Miguel's "Dame", the lead single from the album. AllMusic editor Jose F. Promis noted the song has "underlying hip-hop rhythms".

Nada Es Igual is an album which consists of uptempo "jazzy, brassy, Al Jarreau-like" pop songs and power ballads. Its uptempo tracks include "Si Te Vas" and "Todo Por Su Amor" which utilize horn instruments and "Cómo Es Posible Que a Mi Lado" which incorporates house music. "Dame" is a R&B-lite" with tune hip-hop influences. Los Angeles Times music critic Enrique Lopetegui wrote that the album is "basically a continuation of the singer's favorite turf - ... woman-melting ballads." The first track on the album, "Si Te Vas", is a song about the narrator who yearns to remain with his lover: ("Every morning when I wake up, I feel anxiety in my soul, I want to listen to your voice, I want to feel your kisses"). The power ballads in the album are "Que Tú Te Vas", "Abrázame", "Un Día Más", and the title track. The latter song was accused of plagiarizing "Y mañana volverás", a 1976 composition by Argentine musician Francis Smith. A court ruling in 1999 found that "Nada Es Igual" did not plagiarize "Y mañana volverás". For arrangements on the ballads, Miguel received assistance from the Los Angeles Philharmonic. The album also features the song "Sueña", the Spanish-language version of "Someday" by All-4-One from the movie The Hunchback of Notre Dame. It was released as a single for the Latin American edition of The Hunchback of Notre Dame soundtrack and peaked at number three on the Billboard Hot Latin Songs and number one on the Latin Pop Songs charts in US while also reaching number six on the ballads chart in Mexico.

== Singles and promotion ==
"Dame" was released as the album's lead single on 15 July 1996. It peaked at number two on the Hot Latin Songs chart and reached number one on the Latin Pop Songs chart, becoming his fifth number one song on the latter. In Mexico, "Dame" topped the Mexican ballads chart. The music video for "Dame" was filmed in the Mojave Desert on 29 and 30 June and directed by Marcus Nispel. "Cómo Es Posible Que a Mi Lado" was released as the second single in 1996 from the album with an accompanying music video. It peaked at number ten and number six on the Hot Latin Songs and Latin Pop Songs charts, respectively in the US and topped the ballads chart in Mexico. The album's third single, "Que Tú Te Vas" was released in the same year, peaking at number six on the Hot Latin Songs chart in the US and number on the ballads chart in Mexico, while "Todo Por Su Amor" was released as a promotional single in Europe.

To promote the album, Miguel launched his Tour America 1996 where he toured in South American countries including: Chile, Argentina, Uruguay, Paraguay, Peru, Ecuador, and Brazil. According to his promoter Irma Laura Lopez, Miguel would not tour in the United States as he was taking a break from his previous tour in the country. His set list consisted of pop tunes and ballads from Nada Es Igual.. and his previous recordings as well as boleros from the Romance albums.

== Critical reception and accolades ==
Professional ratings
Review scores
Source	Rating
AllMusic	2.5/5 stars
Contra Costa Times	2/4 stars
Los Angeles Times	2.5/4 stars
Orange County Register	4/5 stars
The San Diego Union-Tribune	2/4 stars

Upon its release Nada Es Igual met with unfavorable reviews from music critics. AllMusic editor Jose F. Promis, who gave the album 2.5 out of five stars, felt the recording was "basically middle-of-the-road, romance-themed music, which is what his legions of fans have come to expect" with the "requisite ballads", similar to his last studio albums. John Lannert of Billboard magazine called Nada Es Igual his "weakest set ever" and said Miguel is "looking more like a conservative underachiever" and criticized the record for its repetitive uptempo pop and R&B tunes although the reviewer commended his vocals. Fernando Gonzalez of the Contra Costa Times rated the album two out of four stars lamenting that Miguel stays "close to his formula" because of the "trademark mix of power ballads and R&B-lite." He complimented the record's production, but stated that the artist "offers more cotton candy" highlighting "Abrázame" and the title tracks as examples, calling "Dame" a "Janet Jackson-lite funk".

The Dallas Morning News music reviewer Mario Tarradell noted that even though the name of the record means "nothing is the same", he remarked that Miguel "hasn't strayed" from his musical style on his pop albums since 20 Años (1990). Although Tarradell praised Miguel's production as "superbly crafted", he chided the record's music for being "totally unadventurous" and called the ballads "complete throwaways." Similarly, Ernesto Portillo Jr., who rated the record two out of four stars, wrote for The San Diego Union-Tribune that the album should have been called "Todo Es Igual" (Everything Is the Same) because of its "same funk-lite horns, thumping bass line and paint-by-numbers pop tunes." He lambasted Miguel for coming off as "redundant and even flat."

Enrique Lopetegui of the Los Angeles Times gave the record 2.5 out of four stars and panned the album's lyrics in songs such as "Si Te Vas" as "corny, one-dimensional visions of loooooove." Lopetegui noted that despite the record's flaws, he considered it "far better than most Latin offerings in this often unlistenable genre" and "less predictable than those of, say, Cristian or Enrique Iglesias." The Orange County Register music editor Anne Valdespino, who gave the record four of five stars, wrote a more positive review of the record. She complimented the songs as "well-crafted, each one produced to the limit" and felt the uptempo songs such as "Dame" and "Si Te Vas" "polished arrangements worthy of Quincy Jones". In contrast to the other reviewers, Valdespino believed that the ballads did not "wear out [their] welcome" with "no overemotive tempo stretching."

At the 39th Annual Grammy Awards in 1997, Nada Es Igual received a Grammy nomination for Best Latin Pop Performance, which went to Enrique Iglesias's self-titled album. At the 9th Annual Lo Nuestro Awards in the same year, the record was nominated in the category of Pop Album of the Year, but lost to Vivir by Iglesias. At the 1997 Eres awards, the record was awarded Best Disc of the Year, which was shared with Tierna La Noche by Fey. In the same year, it was nominated Best Latin Album at the 1997 Premios Amigo.

== Commercial performance ==
Nada Es Igual was released on 20 August 1996. On its launch date, Warner Music Group shipped over 400,000 copies of the record in Mexico and the United States (US). In the US, it debuted at number 28 on the Billboard Top Latin Albums chart on week of 31 August 1996, and peaked on top of the chart the following week replacing Macarena Mix. It spent two weeks on top of the charts before being succeeded by Macarena Non Stop by Los del Río. It was certified gold in the US by the Recording Industry Association of America (RIAA) for shipments of 500,000 copies and ended 1996 as the eighth bestselling Latin album of the year. In Argentina, the record reached number one on its national chart and was certified 7× platinum by Argentine Chamber of Phonograms and Videograms Producers (CAPIF) for sales of 420,000 copies. In Spain, the album peaked at number two on the country's national chart with the number one position being held by Lunas Rotas by Rosana and was certified double platinum by PROMUSICAE for shipments of 200,000 copies. According to Billboard, the record reached sales of over 125,000 units in Chile by February 1997. Nada Es Igual has sold over 3 million copies worldwide.

== Track listing ==
All tracks produced by Luis Miguel and Kiko Cibrian.

No.	Title	Lyrics	Music	Length
1.	"Si Te Vas"	Ignacio "Kiko" Cibrian; Orlando Castro; Salvador Tercero	Cibrian	3:32
2.	"Abrázame"	Rudy Pérez; Mark Portmann	Pérez; Portmann	3:37
3.	"Dame"	Alejandro Lerner	Cibrian; Lerner	4:54
4.	"Nada es Igual"	Cibrian; Lerner	Cibrian	4:25
5.	"Todo Por Su Amor"	Pérez; Manuel Lopez	Pérez; Lopez	3:57
6.	"Que Tú Te Vas"	Francisco Fabián Céspedes	Céspedes	4:10
7.	"Sintiéndote Lejos"	Cibrián; Gerardo Flores; Salo Loyo	Cibrian	4:12
8.	"Cómo Es Posible Que a Mi Lado"	Cibrián; Alejandro Asensi; Luis Miguel	Cibrian; Miguel	4:14
9.	"Un Día Mas"	Cibrián; Asensi; Miguel	Cibrian; Miguel	4:05
10.	"Sueña"	Stephen Schwartz; Miguel; Cibrián; Flores; Renato López	Alan Menken	4:16

== Personnel ==
The following credits are from AllMusic and the Nada Es Igual liner notes:

- Ignacio "Kiko" Cibrián – arranger, guitar, producer, programming, synthesizer
- Robbie Buchanan – keyboards, arranger ("Abrázame", "Un Día Mas")
- Jerry Hey – Brass, arranger, director
- Michael Landau – guitar
- Francisco Loyo – Piano, keyboards
- Lalo Carrillo – bass
- Victor Loyo – drums
- Jeff Nathanson – Saxophone
- Tommy Aros – percussion
- Gary Grant – brass
- Bill Reichenbach – brass
- Brandon Fields – brass
- C. Brock – recording assistance
- Jorge Calandrelli – arranger, coordinator
- L.A. Philharmonic Strings Orchestra – Strings
- Hannah Mancini – background vocals
- Cleto – background vocals
- G. Vodky – background vocals
- Iliana Holland – background vocals
- W. Weaton – background vocals
- Dan Navarro – background vocals
- Brian Gardner – mastering
- Paul McKenna – engineer, project coordinator
- Luis Miguel – Lead vocals, producer
- G. Page – Arranger, coordinator
- D. Shumbach – cello
- Walter Afanasieff – arranger, producer ("Sueña")
- William Ross – conductor, orchestration ("Sueña")
- N. Preston – photography
- Alejandro Basteri – photography
- Alejandro Asensi – artistic coordination

== Charts ==
=== Weekly charts ===
Chart (1996)	Peak position
Argentina (CAPIF)	1
European Albums (Music & Media)	49
Spain (PROMUSICAE)	2
US Top 100 Pop Albums (Cashbox)	40
US Billboard 200	43
US Top Latin Albums (Billboard)	1
US Latin Pop Albums (Billboard)	1

=== Year-end charts ===
Chart (1996)	Position
Argentina (CAPIF)	1
Spain (PROMUSICAE)	33
US Top Latin Albums (Billboard)	8
US Latin Pop Albums (Billboard)	6

Chart (1997)	Position
US Top Latin Albums (Billboard)	12
US Latin Pop Albums (Billboard)	10

== Certifications and sales ==
Region	Certification	Certified units/sales
Argentina (CAPIF)	7× Platinum	500,000
Chile	5× Platinum	150,000
Mexico	—	600,000
Peru	—	7,550
Spain (Promusicae)	2× Platinum	200,000^{^}
United States (RIAA)	Gold	500,000^{^}
Uruguay (CUD)	Platinum	6,000^{^}
Summaries
Worldwide	—	3,000,000
^{^} Shipments figures based on certification alone.

== See also ==
- 1996 in Latin music
- List of best-selling albums in Argentina
- List of best-selling albums in Chile
- List of best-selling Latin albums
- List of number-one Billboard Top Latin Albums from the 1990s
- List of number-one Billboard Latin Pop Albums from the 1990s
