= El Concierto Tour =

1995 concert tour by Luis Miguel

- Tour by Luis Miguel
- Associated album: El Concierto
- Start date: September 15, 1995
- End date: December 31, 1995
- Legs: 1
- No. of shows: 52 in North America; 2 in South America; 54 total

Luis Miguel concert chronology
- Segundo Romance Tour (1994); El Concierto Tour (1995); America Tour (1996)

The El Concierto Tour was a concert tour performed by Luis Miguel, to further promote the album El Concierto which began on September 15, 1995, at the Circus Maximus Showroom in Las Vegas, Nevada and performed across several cities in the United States, Puerto Rico, Mexico and Venezuela. In November 19, Luis Miguel did a special appearance in Sinatra: 80 Years My Way, a television special celebrating Frank Sinatra's 80th birthday, which was held at the Shrine Auditorium in Los Angeles, performing the song "Come Fly with Me".

The setlist of the tour consists of previously recorded pop tracks and ballads, boleros from his Romance albums, and the mariachi songs from El Concierto. The tour concluded on December 31 in Acapulco.

== Set list ==
No.	Title	Original album	Length
1.	"Introduction"
2.	"Dame Tú Amor"	Aries
3.	"Me Niego A Estar Solo"	Aries
4.	"Up Tempo Medley" (Un Hombre Busca Una Mujer / Cuestión de Piel / Oro de Ley)	Busca Una Mujer, 20 Años
5.	"Medley" (Yo Que No Vivo Sin Ti / Culpable O No / Mas Allá de Todo / Fría Como El Viento / Entrégate / Tengo Todo Excepto A Ti / La Incondicional)	Soy Como Quiero Ser, 20 Años, Busca Una Mujer
6.	"Medley" (Ayer / Amante Del Amor / Hasta Que Me Olvides / Pensar En Ti)	Aries, 20 Años
7.	"Alguien Como Tú"	20 Años
8.	"Hasta El Fin"	Aries
9.	"Intro (Guitar) – Todo Y Nada"	Segundo Romance
10.	"No Me Platiques Más"	Romance
11.	"La Barca"	Romance
12.	"Nosotros"	Segundo Romance
13.	"El Día Que Me Quieras"	Segundo Romance
14.	"How Do You Keep The Music Playing (Duet)"	never released by the artist
15.	"Intro (Saxophone) – Que Nivel De Mujer"	Aries
16.	"Come Fly With Me"	Duets II
17.	"La Media Vuelta"	Segundo Romance
18.	"Amanecí En Tus Brazos"	El Concierto
19.	"El Rey"	El Concierto
20.	"Si Nos Dejan"	El Concierto
21.	"Medley" (Separados / Pupilas de Gato)	Busca Una Mujer
22.	"América, América"	América & En Vivo
23.	"Suave"	Aries
24.	"Será Que No Me Amas"	20 Años

== Tour dates ==
List of concerts, showing date, city, country and venue
Date	City	Country	Venue
North America
September 15, 1995	Las Vegas	United States	Circus Maximus Showroom
September 16, 1995	Las Vegas	United States	Circus Maximus Showroom
September 17, 1995	Las Vegas	United States	Circus Maximus Showroom
September 18, 1995	Las Vegas	United States	Circus Maximus Showroom
September 20, 1995	Los Angeles	United States	Universal Amphitheatre
September 21, 1995	Los Angeles	United States	Universal Amphitheatre
September 22, 1995	Los Angeles	United States	Universal Amphitheatre
September 23, 1995	Los Angeles	United States	Universal Amphitheatre
September 28, 1995	New York City	United States	Radio City Music Hall
September 29, 1995	New York City	United States	Radio City Music Hall
September 30, 1995	New York City	United States	Radio City Music Hall
October 1, 1995	New York City	United States	Radio City Music Hall
October 7, 1995	Fairfax	United States	Patriot Center
October 10, 1995	San Juan	Puerto Rico	Roberto Clemente Coliseum
October 11, 1995	San Juan	Puerto Rico	Roberto Clemente Coliseum
October 13, 1995	Miami	United States	James L. Knight Center
October 14, 1995	Miami	United States	James L. Knight Center
October 15, 1995	Miami	United States	James L. Knight Center
October 19, 1995	Dallas	United States	Starplex Amphitheatre
October 21, 1995	Houston	United States	The Summit
October 22, 1995	San Antonio	United States	Alamodome
October 24, 1995	El Paso	United States	Special Events Center
October 26, 1995	San Diego	United States	San Diego Sports Arena
October 27, 1995	San Diego	United States	San Diego Sports Arena
October 29, 1995	Tucson	United States	Tucson Convention Center
October 31, 1995	Phoenix	United States	America West Arena
November 1, 1995	Los Angeles	United States	Universal Amphitheatre
November 2, 1995	Los Angeles	United States	Universal Amphitheatre
November 5, 1995	San Jose	United States	San Jose Arena
November 7, 1995	El Paso	United States	Special Events Center
November 10, 1995	Monterrey	Mexico	Auditorio Coca-Cola
November 11, 1995	Monterrey	Mexico	Auditorio Coca-Cola
November 12, 1995	Monterrey	Mexico	Auditorio Coca-Cola
November 16, 1995	Guadalajara	Mexico	Estadio Tres de Marzo
South America
November 23, 1995	Caracas	Venezuela	Estadio La Rinconada
November 24, 1995	Valencia	Venezuela	Forum de Valencia
North America
November 28, 1995	Mérida	Mexico	Estadio Carlos Iturralde
December 1, 1995	Veracruz	Mexico	Estadio Luis "Pirata" Fuente
December 3, 1995	Puebla	Mexico	Estadio Cuauhtémoc
December 6, 1995	Mexico City	Mexico	National Auditorium
December 7, 1995	Mexico City	Mexico	National Auditorium
December 8, 1995	Mexico City	Mexico	National Auditorium
December 9, 1995	Mexico City	Mexico	National Auditorium
December 10, 1995	Mexico City	Mexico	National Auditorium
December 13, 1995	Mexico City	Mexico	National Auditorium
December 14, 1995	Mexico City	Mexico	National Auditorium
December 15, 1995	Mexico City	Mexico	National Auditorium
December 16, 1995	Mexico City	Mexico	National Auditorium
December 17, 1995	Mexico City	Mexico	National Auditorium
December 19, 1995	Mexico City	Mexico	National Auditorium
December 20, 1995	Mexico City	Mexico	National Auditorium
December 22, 1995	Mexico City	Mexico	National Auditorium
December 23, 1995	Mexico City	Mexico	National Auditorium
December 31, 1995	Acapulco	Mexico	Centro de Convenciones
54 Concerts	23 cities	4 countries	23 venues

- Note: Some dates may be missing due to the lack of reliable sources.

=== Box office score data ===
Venue	City	Tickets sold / available	Gross revenue
Auditorio Coca-Cola	Monterrey	31,314 / 45,000	$796,141
Radio City Music Hall	New York City	21,693 / 23,968	$1,202,710
San Diego Sports Arena	San Diego	10,703 / 10,703	$535,213
	Total	63,710 / 79,671 (79,9%)	$2,534,064

== Cancelled shows ==
List of cancelled concerts, showing date, city, country, venue, and reason for cancellation
Date	City	Country	Venue	Reason
October 6, 1995	Camden	United States	Waterfront Entertainment Centre	Logistical problems
December 4, 1995 (Note: The December 4, 1995 canceled concert in León was previously scheduled to take place on November 14, but was postponed due to production failure.)	León	Mexico	Estadio La Martinica	Unknown

== Tour personnel ==
Personnel adapted from Tour itinerary booklet.

=== Performance credits ===
Band

- Luis Miguel – vocals
- Kiko Cibrian – musical director, acoustic guitar, electric guitar
- Francisco Loyo – piano
- Arturo Pérez – keyboards
- Victor Loyo – drums
- Gerardo Carrillo – bass
- Jeff Nathanson – saxophone
- Alex Carballo – trombone
- Francisco Abonce – trumpet
- Tony Lujan – trumpet
- Leonard Lopez – percussion
- Victor Potenza – bandoneon
- Hannah Mancini – choir
- Diane Ulibarri – choir

Mariachi 2000

- Cutberto Pérez – director, trumpet
- Juan Guzmán – trumpet
- Hugo Santiago – violin
- Pedro García – violin
- Martin Pinzón – violin
- José Ignacio Vázquez – violin
- Petronilo Godinez – violin
- Francisco Javier García – violin
- Julio de Santiago – violin
- Emilio Pérez – violin
- Fernando Hernández – guitarrón
- Miguel Flores – vihuela
- Juan Carlos Navarro – guitar
