= Dame (Luis Miguel song) =

1996 song

Single by Luis Miguel

from the album Nada Es Igual...
- Released: 15 July 1996
- Recorded: February 1996
- Studio: Record Plant (Los Angeles, California)
- Genre: R&B; funk
- Length: 4:54
- Label: WEA Latina
- Songwriters: Alejandro Lerner; Ignacio "Kiko" Cibrian
- Producers: Luis Miguel; Kiko Cibrian

Luis Miguel singles chronology
"Sueña" (1996)	"Dame" (1996)	"Cómo Es Posible Que a Mi Lado" (1996)

Music video
- "Dame" on YouTube

"Dame" (English: "Give Me") is a song written by Alejandro Lerner and Kiko Cibrian and performed by Mexican recording artist Luis Miguel. It was released as the lead single from his eleventh studio album Nada Es Igual... on 15 July 1996 to radio stations. "Dame" was recorded at the Record Plant studio in Los Angeles, California. The song incorporates R&B and hip-hop influences. The music video for "Dame" was directed by Marcus Nispel and filmed at the Mojave Desert in California and was nominated Video of the Year. It received mixed reactions from music critics who felt that the track sounded too similar to his previous pop recordings. "Dame" peaked at number two and one on the Billboard Hot Latin Songs and Latin Pop Songs charts in the United States and received a BMI Latin Award in 1998.

== Recording and composition ==
Luis Miguel "Dame"
A 29-second sample of Miguel's "Dame", the lead single from the album. AllMusic editor Jose F. Promis noted the song has "underlying hip-hop rhythms".

"Dame" was recorded at the Record Plant studio in Los Angeles, California in February 1996. It was written by Alejandro Lerner and Ignacio "Kiko" Cibrian and co-produced by the latter and Luis Miguel. "Dame" is an uptempo "R&B-lite" track with "underlying hip-hop rhythms". Fernando Gonzalez of the Contra Costa Times called it "Janet Jackson"-lite funk". The track features Pancho Loyo on the organ, Paul Jackson Jr. with the guitar, Gene Page conducting the string instruments, Jerry Hey performing the brass instruments, and was engined and mixed by Paul McKenna. In the song, Miguel uses the word "Dame" 19 times including in some phrases such as "dame alguna prueba de amor" ("give me some proof of love"), "dame un mapa de tu cuerpo" ("give me a map of your body"), and "dame todos tus sentidos" ("give me all your senses").

== Music video ==
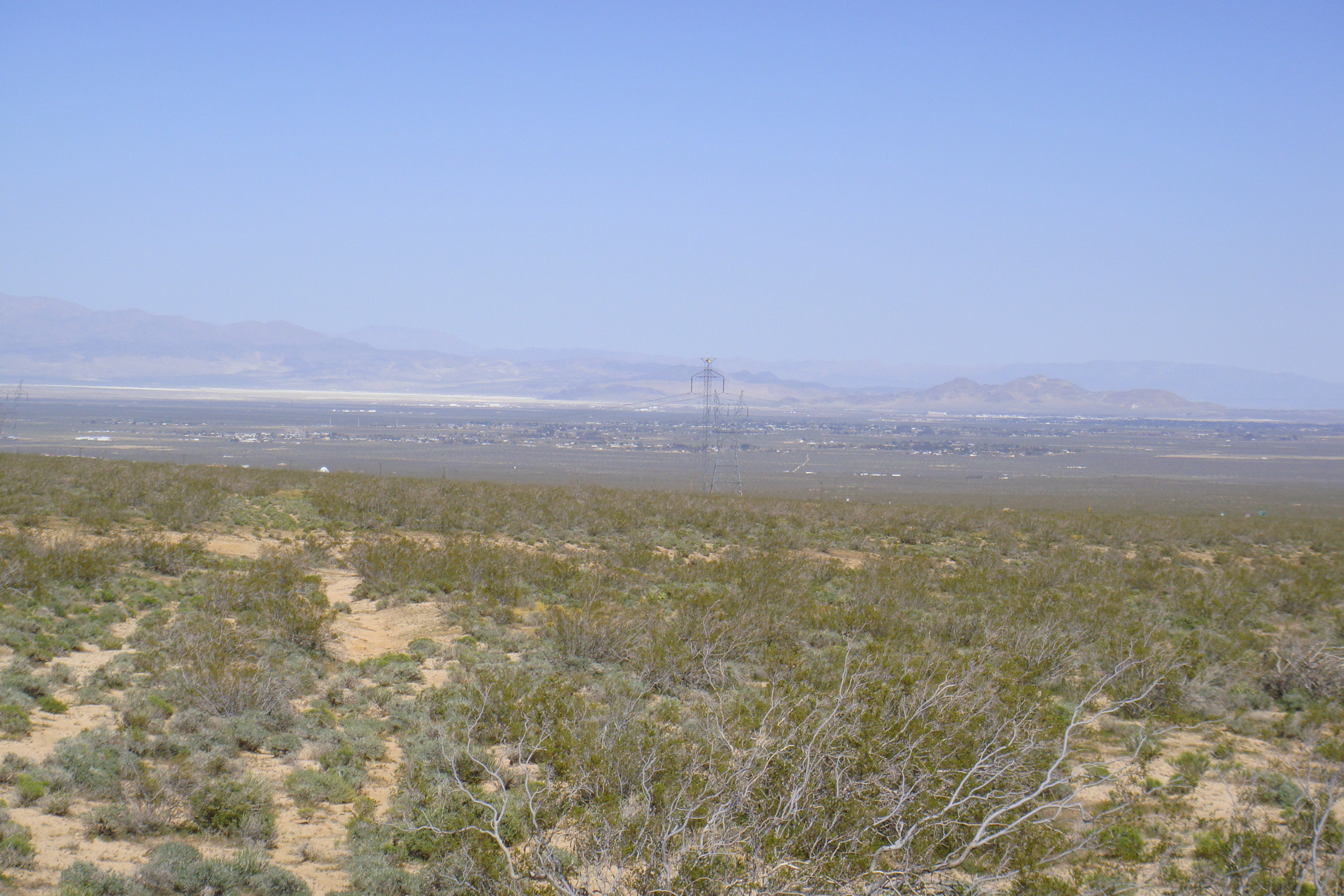
The Mojave Desert, where the music video for "Dame" was filmed.

The music video for "Dame" was direct by German director Marcus Nispel, who also directed the video for "Runaway" by Janet Jackson. Filming took place on 29 and 30 June 1996 in the Mojave Desert near Los Angeles, California and took two hours to complete. The total cost of the video was US$250,000. The video features Miguel and a group of trumpeters who are dressed in a black suit; black-and-white scenes with a woman, and explosions in the background. During the previous scenes 375 kilos of dynamite were used. Miguel did not want a body double during the explosion scenes as he "did not want to leave this experience behind". Achy Obejas of the Chicago Tribune opined: "There's Luis Miguel, unshaven, looking haggard, wearing a suit in the middle of the Mojave. He's not all that toned, he's just a guy: An hombre, not a muchacho anymore." It received a nomination for Video of the Year at the 1997 Lo Nuestro Awards, but lost to "La Aurora" by Eros Ramazzotti.

== Live performances and other appearances ==
Miguel performed "Dame" as part of the set list for his Tour America 1996 (1996) and Romances Tour (1997-98), and the first leg of the Amarte Es Un Placer Tour. "Dame" and its music video was included on Miguel's compilation album Grandes Éxitos (2005).

== Critical reception and accolade ==
Upon its release, "Dame" received mixed reactions from music critics. El Siglo de Torreón editor Juan Pablo García Macotela felt that the song did not differ from Miguel's previous pop recordings citing the song's "same sound, same musical structure, same style that has not changed a bit". He also felt that the over usage of the word "Dame" on several phrases made the song "monotonous". Ernesto Portillo, Jr. of The San Diego Union-Tribune noted that "Miguel fans will surely enjoy the up-tempo "Dame"".

The Dallas Morning News editor Mario Tarradell commented: "While there's no denying the catchiness of his radio-ready, R&B-lite fare – "Si Te Vas", "Dame", "Todo Por Su Amor" – there are no distinguishing licks to separate these songs from past hits such as "Suave", "Sera Que No Me Amas" and "Oro de Ley"." Anne Valdespino called "Dame" a "bright, upbeat" tune" and felt it was "among the best tracks on the album". She also praised the arrangements in the song as "polished arrangements worthy of Quincy Jones". "Dame" was recognized at the 1998 BMI Latin Awards as one of the best performing songs of the year.

== Release and commercial performance ==
"Dame" was commercially released on 15 July 1996. In the United States (US), it debuted at number 19 on the Billboard Hot Latin Songs on the week of the 17 August 1996. The song peaked at number two on the Billboard Hot Latin Songs chart in the US with the number one position being held off by Marco Antonio Solís's song "Que Pena Me Das". On the Latin Pop Songs chart, it debuted at number 12 on the week of the 17 August 1996. It reached number one on the Latin Pop Songs chart three weeks later, becoming his fifth number one song on the chart. The song remained on top of this chart for five weeks until it was replaced by Chayanne's song "Solamente Tu Amor". "Dame" ended 1996 as the ninth best-performing Latin pop song in the US.

== Track listing ==
US promo

1. "Dame" – 4:54

Remix

1. "Dame" (New Club Soda Mix) – 6:31
2. "Dame" (instrumental version) – 4:50

== Personnel ==
Credits adapted from the Nada Es Igual... liner notes.

- Luis Miguel – vocals, producer
- K. Cibrian – guitar, co-producer, arranger, programming
- F. Loyo – piano
- G. Page – string arrangements
- L.A. Philharmonic Strings Orchestra – strings
- J. Hey – Brass, brass arranger and direction
- G. Grant – brass
- B.Reichenbach – brass
- B. Fields – brass
- H. Mancini – background vocals
- G. Vodky – background vocals
- I. Holland – background vocals
- W. Weaton – background vocals
- D. Navarro – background vocals
- Cleto – background vocals

== Charts ==
=== Weekly charts ===
Chart (1996)	Peak position
US Hot Latin Songs (Billboard)	2
US Latin Pop Airplay (Billboard)	1

=== Year-end charts ===
Chart (1996)	Position
US Latin Songs (Billboard)	20
US Latin Pop Songs (Billboard)	9

== See also ==
- List of Billboard Latin Pop Airplay number ones of 1996
