= Cibrian =

Cibrian is a surname. Notable people with the surname include:

- Eddie Cibrian (born 1973), American actor
- José Cibrián (1916–2002), Argentinean actor
- Kiko Cibrian (born 1959), Mexican-American guitarist and composer
