= Todos Los Romances =

Box set by Luis Miguel
- Released: 11 August 1998
- Recorded: 1991–97
- Genre: Bolero
- Length: 1:33:02
- Language: Spanish
- Label: WEA Latina

Todos Los Romances (All the Romances) is a box set compilation album by Mexican singer Luis Miguel. Released on 11 August 1998 by WEA Latina, the record features the three previously released Romance-themed albums in which Miguel covered classic boleros in each of them: Romance (1991), Segundo Romance (1994), and Romances (1997). An editor for AllMusic rated the album four of five stars. Commercially, Todos Los Romances peaked at number four in Spain and was certified double Platinum in the country. It also achieved Gold status in Argentina and peaked at number 12 on the Billboard's Top Latin Albums in the United States.

== Background and release ==
In 1991, Miguel released his eighth studio album, Romance, a collection of classic boleros, the oldest dating to the 1940s. Produced by Armando Manzanero and arranged by Bebu Silvetti, the record was a success in Latin America and sold over seven million copies worldwide. It revived interest in the bolero genre, and was the first record by a Spanish-speaking artist to be certified Gold in Brazil, Taiwan and the United States. It received a Grammy nomination for Best Latin Pop Album. Its follow-up, Segundo Romance, was released in 1994; Manzanero, Juan Carlos Calderón and Kiko Cibrian co-produced the record with Miguel, with it winning a Grammy Award for Best Latin Pop Performance. In 1997 Romances was released, with Miguel and Manzanero co-producing Silvetti's arrangements; it sold over 4.5 million copies, winning another Grammy for Best Latin Pop Performance. Each of the three discs were certified Platinum by the Recording Industry Association of America for shipping one million copies in the United States. One year after the release of Romances, WEA Latina announced that it will issue a three-disc compilation album Todos Los Romances, which contains three Romance-themed albums and was released on 11 August 1998.

== Reception ==
An editor for AllMusic gave the album a four out of five star rating. In Spain, Todos Los Romances debuted and peaked number four on the Spanish Albums Chart, selling over 200,000 copies in the country and gaining a double Platinum certification awarded by Productores de Música de España for shipping 200,000. In the United States, the record peaked at number 12 on the Billboard's Top Latin Albums and number six on the Latin Pop Albums chart. In Argentina, it was awarded Gold by the Argentine Chamber of Phonograms and Videograms Producers for shipments of 30,000 copies.

== Track listing ==
Disc 1 (Romance)
No.	Title	Writer(s)	Length
1.	"No Me Platiques Más"	Vicente Garrido	3:31
2.	"Inolvidable"	Julio Gutiérrez	4:16
3.	"La Puerta"	Luis Demetrio	3:19
4.	"La Barca"	Roberto Cantoral	3:28
5.	"Te Extraño"	Armando Manzanero	4:23
6.	"Usted"	Gabriel Ruiz; Monis Zorrilla	3:43
7.	"Contigo en la Distancia"	César Portillo de la Luz	3:23
8.	"Mucho Corazón"	Emma Elena Valdelamar	3:23
9.	"La Mentira"	Álvaro Carrillo	3:46
10.	"Cuando Vuelva a Tu Lado"	María Grever	3:48
11.	"No Sé Tú"	Manzanero	3:50
12.	"Cómo"	Chico Novarro	3:14
Total length:			44:02

Disc 2 (Segundo Romance)
No.	Title	Writer(s)	Length
1.	"El Día Que Me Quieras"	Carlos Gardel; Alfredo Le Pera	3:58
2.	"Sin Ti"	Pepe Guízar	3:00
3.	"Somos Novios"	Manzanero	3:10
4.	"La Media Vuelta"	José Alfredo Jiménez	2:42
5.	"Solamente una Vez"	Agustín Lara	2:58
6.	"Todo y Nada"	Garrido	3:35
7.	"Historia de un Amor"	Carlos Almarán	3:55
8.	"Como Yo Te Amé"	Manzanero	3:30
9.	"Nosotros"	Pedro Junco	4:00
10.	"Yo Sé Que Volverás"	Manzanero; Luis Pérez Sabido	3:35
11.	"Delirio"	Portillo de la Luz	4:34
Total length:			38:57

Disc 3 (Romances)
No.	Title	Writer(s)	Length
1.	"Voy a Apagar la Luz / Contigo Aprendí"	Manzanero	4:10
2.	"Sabor a Mí"	Álvaro Carrillo	3:05
3.	"Por Debajo de la Mesa"	Manzanero	3:03
4.	"La Gloria Eres Tú"	José Antonio Mendez	3:21
5.	"Amanecer"	Manzanero	3:31
6.	"Encadenados"	Carlos Arturo Briz
7.	"Bésame Mucho"	Consuelo Velázquez	5:26
8.	"Contigo (Estar Contigo)"	Bebu Silvetti; Sylvia Riera Ibañez	4:08
9.	"Noche De Ronda"	Lara	4:16
10.	"El Reloj"	Cantoral	3:02
11.	"Júrame"	Grever	3:57
12.	"De Quererte Así (De T'Avoir Aimee)"	Charles Aznavour; Alex Marco	3:13
13.	"Uno"	Enrique Santos Discépolo; Mariano Mores	4:48
14.	"Mañana de Carnaval (Manhã de Carnaval)"	Luiz Bonfá; Antonio Maria; Jesus María Arozamena	4:06
Total length:			54:05

== Charts ==
=== Weekly charts ===
Chart (1998)	Peak position
European Albums (Music & Media)	71
Spain (PROMUSICAE)	4
US Top Latin Albums (Billboard)	12
US Latin Pop Albums (Billboard)	6

=== Year-end charts ===
Chart (1998)	Peak position
Spain (PROMUSICAE)	40

== Certifications ==
Region	Certification	Certified units/sales
Argentina (CAPIF)	Gold	30,000^{^}
Spain (Promusicae)	2× Platinum	200,000^{^}
^{^} Shipments figures based on certification alone.
