= El Concierto =

Live album by Luis Miguel

Live album and Video album by Luis Miguel
- Released: 17 October 1995
- Recorded: 4–28 August 1994, 11 November 1994
- Venues: National Auditorium (Mexico City, Mexico); José Amalfitani Stadium (Buenos Aires, Argentina)
- Genres: Bolero; ranchera; mariachi; Latin pop
- Length: 1:29:23
- Language: Spanish
- Label: WEA Latina
- Producers: Luis Miguel; Kiko Cibrian

Luis Miguel chronology
Segundo Romance (1994)	El Concierto (1995)	Nada Es Igual... (1996)

Luis Miguel video chronology
Romance: En Vivo (1992)	El Concierto (1995)	Los Videos (1997)

Singles from El Concierto
- 1. "Si Nos Dejan" Released: 30 August 1995; 2. "Amanecí en Tus Brazos" Released: December 1995

El Concierto (English: The Concert) is the second live album by Mexican recording artist Luis Miguel, released on 17 October 1995 by WEA Latina. It was recorded from his performances at the National Auditorium in Mexico and at the José Amalfitani Stadium in 1994 during his Segundo Romance Tour. The album features live covers of José Alfredo Jiménez's songs ("Si Nos Dejan", "Amanecí en Tus Brazos", and "El Rey"), which were previously unreleased. The first two songs were released as singles, the former reaching number one on the Billboard Hot Latin Songs chart and the latter peaking at number three on the same chart.

Upon its release, El Concierto received generally favorable reviews from critics, who praised its production, Miguel's vocals, and his renditions of Jiménez's rancheras. The album peaked at number two on the Billboard Top Latin Albums chart and both the album and video were certified gold by the Recording Industry Association of America. It topped the Argentine Albums Chart and the album was certified 4× platinum by CAPIF. The record also reached number two on the Chilean Albums Chart and achieved diamond status in the country and double platinum in Mexico, Platinum in Paraguay, and Uruguay. The album sold over two million copies within a year of its release. El Concierto won the Eres award for Album of the Year and received a nomination for Pop Album of the Year at the 1996 Lo Nuestro Awards.

== Background and release ==
In 1994 Miguel released his tenth studio album, Segundo Romance. It is follow-up to his 1991 album Romance where Miguel records a collection of classic boleros and Latin American standards. It sold over one million copies within two days of its release, and was certified platinum in the United States for shipping one million copies, making Miguel the first Latin artist with two platinum discs in the U.S. (the other is Romance). To further promote the album Miguel began his Segundo Romance Tour with 16 shows at the National Auditorium in Mexico City, which drew an audience of over 155,000. The singer performed throughout Mexico, the United States, Peru, and Argentina until 31 December 1994, when the tour concluded in Acapulco. His sixteen performances at the National Auditorium in Mexico City and two concerts at the Estadio Vélez in Buenos Aires were filmed for inclusion in a live album.

It was made available in four formats: a double live audio CD, cassette, Laserdisc, and video. The formats included the full performances of 28 songs from the concerts. The album was released on 17 October 1995. El Concierto includes three live renditions of José Alfredo Jiménez's songs: "Si Nos Dejan", "Amanecí en Tus Brazos", and "El Rey". During these performances, Miguel was accompanied by Mariachi 2000 led by Cutberto Pérez. "Si Nos Dejan" was released as a single for the album on 30 August 1995. The song reached number one on the Billboard Hot Latin Songs chart, becoming his twelfth number one song on the chart. It also topped the ranchera charts in Mexico. "Amanecí en Tus Brazos" was released as the second single in December 1995 and peaked at number three on the Hot Latin Songs charts and number one on the ranchera charts in Mexico. The live version of "Hasta Que Me Olvides" was released as a promotional single in Spain. In addition to the singles, "El Rey" peaked at number seven on the ranchera charts in Mexico.

To further promote the album, Miguel launched the El Concierto Tour which began on 15 September 1995 at the Circus Maximus Showroom in Las Vegas, Nevada and performed across several cities in the United States. The setlist consists of previously recorded pop tracks and ballads, boleros from his Romance albums, and the mariachi songs from El Concierto. The tour concluded on 31 in Acapulco.

== Critical reception ==
Professional ratings
Review scores
Source	Rating
Allmusic	4.5 stars

Stephen Thomas Erlewine of AllMusic gave El Concierto 4.5 out of 5 stars, praising the inclusion of the mariachi performances calling it a "good introduction to the singer, since it features his biggest hits and he gives a flashy, impassioned performance". John Lannert of Billboard magazine called the album a "predictable, albeit fan-pleasing, double CD live set" and referred to his mariachi performances as "classics done up mariachi style". Chito de la Torre wrote for La Prensa de San Antonio praised the album, stating that Miguel "stands among the few that are genuinely good both on disc and live" and complimented its "energetic feel and live audience reactions". Rene Carbrera of the Corpus Christi Caller-Times said the album's productions "essentially takes listeners through one of Miguel's dynamic performances" and praised the bolero performances as "superbly executed as pop ballads by Miguel." Regarding the mariachi songs, Cabrera stated "If there's anything that stands out about the Jimenez creations, it is that the tunes are as indestructible as the emotions described in them. Add to that quality the musicianship that Miguel brings to bear and you have some excellent music."The San Diego Union-Tribune editor Ernesto Portillo Jr. gave the album four out of four stars, complimenting Miguel's vocals, his pop tunes as "sizzling", and remarked that Miguel "shows his musical prowess with convincing mariachi-backed renditions of four ranchera classics written by the late Mexican singer-composer Jose Alfredo Jimenez".

At the 1996 Eres award ceremony, El Concierto won award for Album of the Year and Miguel was the Artist of the Year. In the same year, the record received a nomination for Pop Album of the Year at the 8th Annual Lo Nuestro Awards, but lost to Enrique Iglesias's self-titled album. "Si Nos Dejan" was also nominated Pop Song of the Year, again losing to Iglesias for his song "Si Tu Te Vas". Miguel won the award for Pop Male Artist of the Year.

== Commercial performance ==
In the United States, El Concierto debuted and peaked at number two on the Billboard Top Latin Albums chart with the number one position being held by Selena's album Dreaming of You. It held this position for only two weeks before being replaced by Abriendo Puertas by Gloria Estefan. The record also peaked at number 45 on the Billboard 200 and number two on the Latin Pop Albums chart. Both the album and the video were certified gold by the Recording Industry Association of America (RIAA); the former for shipping 500,000 and the latter for shipping 50,000 copies. In Argentina, El Concierto debuted at number one on the Argentine albums chart and the album was certified 4× platinum by CAPIF for sales of 240,000 copies while the video received a platinum certification for sales of 8,000 copies. The album reached number two on the Chilean albums and was certified platinum in the country. It also achieved platinum status in Mexico, Paraguay, and Uruguay. Elsewhere, it was certified gold in Bolivia and Spain, quintuple platinum in Venezuela, and triple platinum in Central America. El Concierto sold over two million copies within a year of its release.

== Track listing ==
Disc 1
No.	Title	Writer(s)	Length
1.	"Introduccion"		1:10
2.	"Luz Verde"	Rudy Pérez	3:46
3.	"Pensar en Ti"	Francisco Fabián Céspedes	4:32
4.	"Dame Tu Amor"	Ignacio "Kiko" Cibrian; Adrián Possé	4:56
5.	"No Sé Tú"	Armando Manzanero	3:56
6.	"Alguien Como Tú (Somebody in Your Life)"	Robbie Buchanan; Diane Warren; Angel Marquez	5:29
7.	"Medley" (Yo Que No Vivo Sin Ti, Culpable o No (Miénteme Como Siempre), Más Allá de Todo, Fría Como el Viento, Entrégate, Tengo Todo Excepto a Ti, La Incondicional)		16:33
8.	"Suave"	Cibrian; Orlando Castro	5:39

Disc 2
No.	Title	Writer(s)	Length
1.	"Introduccion Guitarra"		1:33
2.	"Hasta Que Me Olvides"	Juan Luis Guerra	4:25
3.	"Que Nivel de Mujer"	Emilio Castillo; Orlando Castro; Stephen Kupka	4:43
4.	"Historia de un Amor"	Carlos Eleta Almarán	3:52
5.	"Nosotros"	Pedro Junco	3:52
6.	"Somos Novios"	Manzanero	3:16
7.	"Sin Ti"	Pepe Guízar	3:07
8.	"El Día Que Me Quieras"	Carlos Gardel; Alfredo Le Pera	3:59
9.	"La Media Vuelta"	José Alfredo Jiménez	2:44
10.	"Si Nos Dejan"	Jiménez	2:32
11.	"Amanecí en Tus Brazos"	Jiménez	2:31
12.	"El Rey"	Jiménez	3:16
13.	"Será Que No Me Amas (Blame It on the Boogie)"	Mick Jackson; Elmar Krohn; Juan Carlos Calderón	4:36

Video
No.	Title	Length
1.	"Luz Verde"
2.	"Pensar en Ti"
3.	"Dame Tu Amor"
4.	"No Sé Tú"
5.	"Alguien Como Tú (Somebody in Your Life)"
6.	"Medley"
7.	"Suave"
8.	"Hasta Que Me Olvides"
9.	"Que Nivel de Mujer"
10.	"Historia de un Amor"
11.	"Nosotros"
12.	"Somos Novios"
13.	"Sin Ti"
14.	"El Día Que Me Quieras"
15.	"La Media Vuelta"
16.	"Si Nos Dejan"
17.	"El Rey"
18.	"Será Que No Me Amas (Blame It on the Boogie)"

== Personnel ==
Adapted from AllMusic.

=== Performers ===
- Juan Manuel Arpero – conductor, trumpet
- Alejandro Carballo – trombone
- Eduardo “Lalo” Carrillo - bass
- Armando Cedillo – trumpet
- Idelfonso Cedillo – cello
- Ignacio "Kiko" Cibrián – director, guitar, producer
- Daniel Cruz – viola
- Miguel Flores – guitar
- Pedro Garcia – violin
- Alfonso Gonzalez – violin
- Arturo González – violin
- Aarón Jiménez – violin
- Francisco Loyo – piano
- Victor Loyo – drums
- Ignacio Mariscal – cello
- Antonio Medrano – violin
- Martín Medrano – violin
- Luis Miguel – producer, lead vocals
- Jeff Nathanson – saxophone
- Arturo Perez – keyboards
- Cutberto Perez – director, trumpet
- Emilio Perez – violin
- Patricia Tanus – background vocals

=== Technical ===
- Craig Brock – assistant engineer
- Bernie Grundman – mastering
- Paul McKenna – digital engineer
- Francisco Miranda – engineer
- Neal Preston – photography
- Carlos Somonte – photography
- Salvador Tercero – assistant engineer
- Sergio Toporek & Christian Vinay – concept, design, digital imaging

== Charts ==
=== Weekly charts ===
Chart (1995–96)	Peak position
Argentine Albums (CAPIF)	1
Chilean Albums (IFPI)	2
Spanish Albums (PROMUSICAE)	17
US Billboard 200	45
US Top Latin Albums (Billboard)	2
US Latin Pop Albums (Billboard)	2

=== Year-end charts ===
Chart (1995)	Peak position
US Top Latin Albums (Billboard)	18
US Latin Pop Albums (Billboard)	9

Chart (1996)	Peak position
US Top Latin Albums (Billboard)	7
US Latin Pop Albums (Billboard)	7

== Certifications ==
=== Album ===
Region	Certification	Certified units/sales
Argentina (CAPIF)	4× Platinum	240,000^{^}
Bolivia	Gold	
Central America (CFC)	Platinum	
Chile	Diamond	250,000
Ecuador	Gold	
Mexico (AMPROFON)	2× Platinum	500,000
Paraguay	Platinum	
Spain (Promusicae)	Platinum	100,000^{^}
United States (RIAA)	Gold	500,000^{^}
Uruguay (CUD)	Platinum	6,000^{^}
Venezuela	2× Platinum	
Summaries
Worldwide	—	2,000,000
^{^} Shipments figures based on certification alone.

=== Video ===
Region	Certification	Certified units/sales
Argentina (CAPIF)	Platinum	8,000^{^}
Mexico	—	10,000
United States (RIAA)	Gold	50,000^{^}
Summaries
Worldwide	—	100,000

== See also ==
- 1995 in Latin music
- List of best-selling albums in Chile
- List of best-selling Latin albums
