= María (Cátulo Castillo song) =

"María" is a 1945 tango written by Aníbal Troilo with lyrics by Cátulo Castillo, and first sung by Alberto Marino in the same year. It was among the tango standards selected by Plácido Domingo for his 1981 album Plácido Domingo Sings Tangos.
