= Plácido Domingo Sings Tangos =

Plácido Domingo Sings Tangos is a 1981 album by Plácido Domingo. The album was recorded in Argentina where it sold over 80,000 copies.

== Track listing ==
1. "Caminito" 3:18
2. "Nostalgias" 3:31 Music by: Juan Carlos Cobian. Lyrics by: Enrique Cadicamo. (1936)
3. "Volver" 3:26
4. Vida mía 3:51 Music: Osvaldo Fresedo Lyrics: Emilio Fresedo (1933)
5. "Mi Buenos Aires querido" 3:24
6. El día que me quieras 3:41
7. "Uno" 3:45
8. "María" 3:04
9. "Alma de bohemio" 3:16 Music: Roberto Firpo Lyrics: Juan Andrés Caruso (1914)
10. "Cuesta abajo" 3:26 "Si arrastré por estemundo" Lyricist: Alfredo Le Pera Composer: Carlos Gardel (1934)

== Certifications ==
Region	Certification	Certified units/sales
Spain (PROMUSICAE)	Gold	50,000^{^}
^{^} Shipments figures based on certification alone.
