= List of number-one hits of 1994 (Mexico) =

This is a list of the songs that reached number one in Mexico in 1994, according to the Notitas Musicales magazine with data provided by Radio Mil(which also provided charts for Billboard's "Hits of the World" between 1969 and 1981). Notitas Musicales was a bi-weekly magazine that published two record charts:

- "Canciones que México canta" ("Songs that Mexico sings"), which listed the Top 10 most popular Spanish-language songs in Mexico, and
- "Éxitos internacionales en México" ("International Hits in Mexico"), which listed the most popular songs in Mexico that were in languages other than Spanish.

== Chart history ==
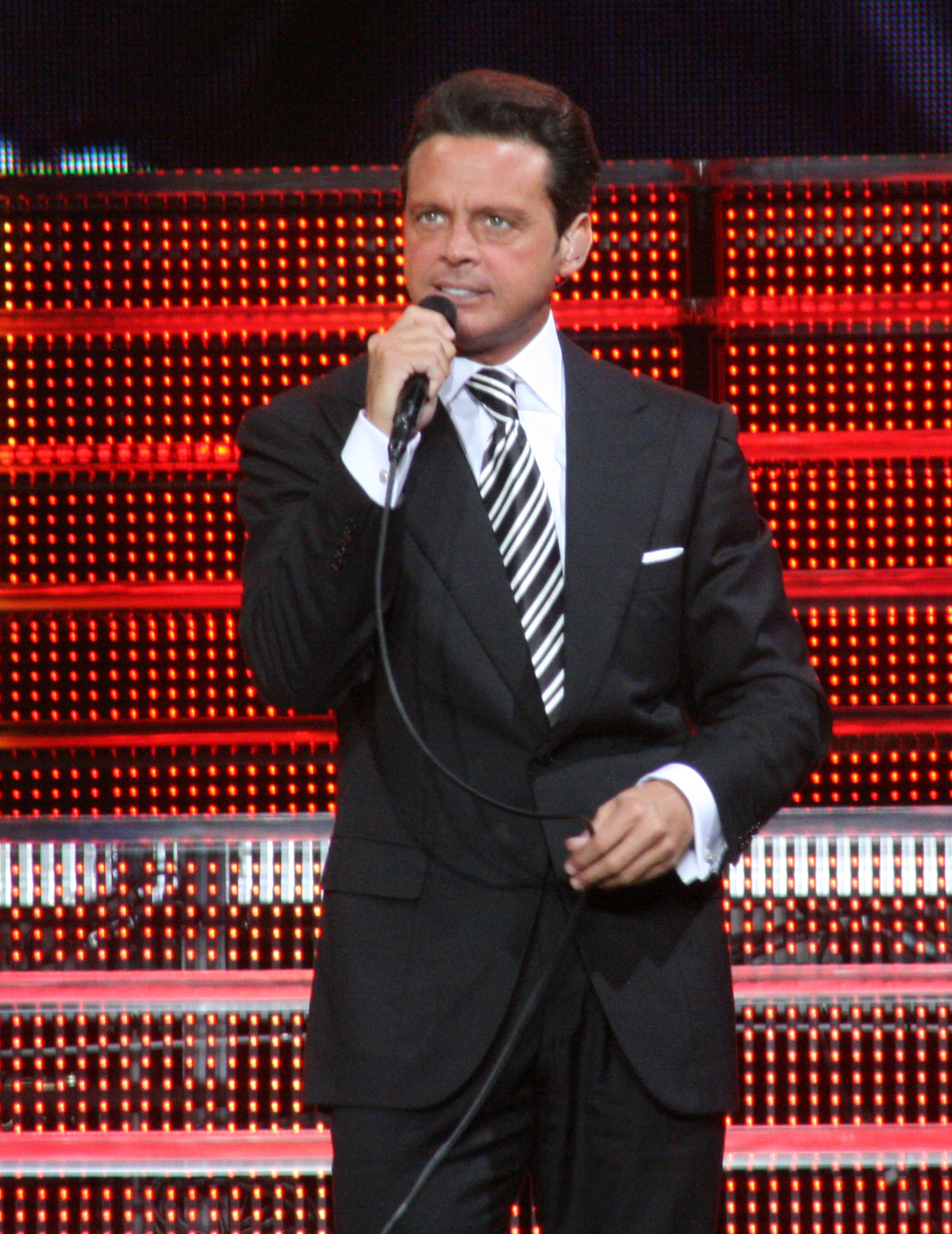
Mexican singer Luis Miguel (pictured) had four No. 1 Spanish-language songs throughout the year.

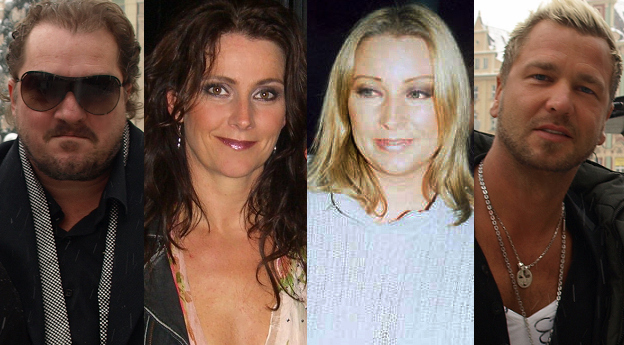
Swedish group Ace of Base (pictured) had three No. 1 hits on the "International Hits" chart.

Issue Date	Spanish-language songs		Other languages		Ref.
Issue Date	Song	Artist(s)	Song	Artist(s)	Ref.
January 4	"Detrás de mi ventana"	Yuri	"Go West"	Pet Shop Boys	
January 18	"Detrás de mi ventana"	Yuri	"Go West"	Pet Shop Boys	
February 1	"Detrás de mi ventana"	Yuri	"All That She Wants"	Ace of Base	
February 15	"Nieva, Nieva"	Paulina Rubio	"All That She Wants"	Ace of Base	
March 1	"Nieva, Nieva"	Paulina Rubio	"All That She Wants"	Ace of Base	
March 15	"Suave"	Luis Miguel	"All For Love"	Bryan Adams, Rod Stewart & Sting	
March 29	"Suave"	Luis Miguel	"All That She Wants"	Ace of Base	
April 12	"Suave"	Luis Miguel	"All That She Wants"	Ace of Base	
April 26	"Sueño por sueño"	Magneto	"All About Soul"	Billy Joel	
10 May	"Te lloré un río"	Maná	"The Sign"	Ace of Base	
24 May	"Te acordarás de mí"	Lucero	"The Sign"	Ace of Base	
June 7	"Te acordarás de mí"	Lucero	"The Sign"	Ace of Base	
June 21	"Te acordarás de mí"	Lucero	"The Sign"	Ace of Base	
July 5	"Pensar en ti"	Luis Miguel	"The Sign"	Ace of Base	
July 19	"Pero, ¿qué necesidad?"	Juan Gabriel	"The Sign"	Ace of Base	
August 2	"Pero, ¿qué necesidad?"	Juan Gabriel	"The Sign"	Ace of Base	
August 16	"Pero, ¿qué necesidad?"	Juan Gabriel	"Dreams"	The Cranberries	
August 30	"Pero, ¿qué necesidad?"	Juan Gabriel	"Take It Back"	Pink Floyd	
September 13	"Pero, ¿qué necesidad?"	Juan Gabriel	"Don't Turn Around"	Ace of Base	
September 27	"El día que me quieras"	Luis Miguel	"Don't Turn Around"	Ace of Base	
October 11	"El día que me quieras"	Luis Miguel	"Dreams"	The Cranberries	
October 25	"El día que me quieras"	Luis Miguel	"Dreams"	The Cranberries	
November 8	"El día que me quieras"	Luis Miguel	"Dreams"	The Cranberries	
November 22	"Lentamente"	Juan Gabriel	"Stay (I Missed You)"	Lisa Loeb & Nine Stories	
December 6	"Lentamente"	Juan Gabriel	"Stay (I Missed You)"	Lisa Loeb & Nine Stories	
December 20	"La media vuelta"	Luis Miguel	"Stay (I Missed You)"	Lisa Loeb & Nine Stories	

== See also ==
- 1994 in music

== Sources ==
- Print editions of the Notitas Musicales magazine.
