= Estadio Mario Alberto Kempes =

Football stadium in Córdoba, Argentina

Coordinates: 31°22′8″S 64°14′46″W

Mario Alberto Kempes Stadium
- Estadio Mario Alberto Kempes
- Chateau Carreras
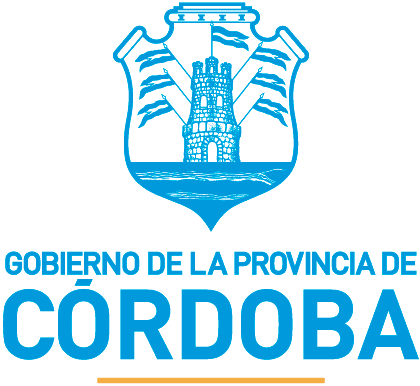

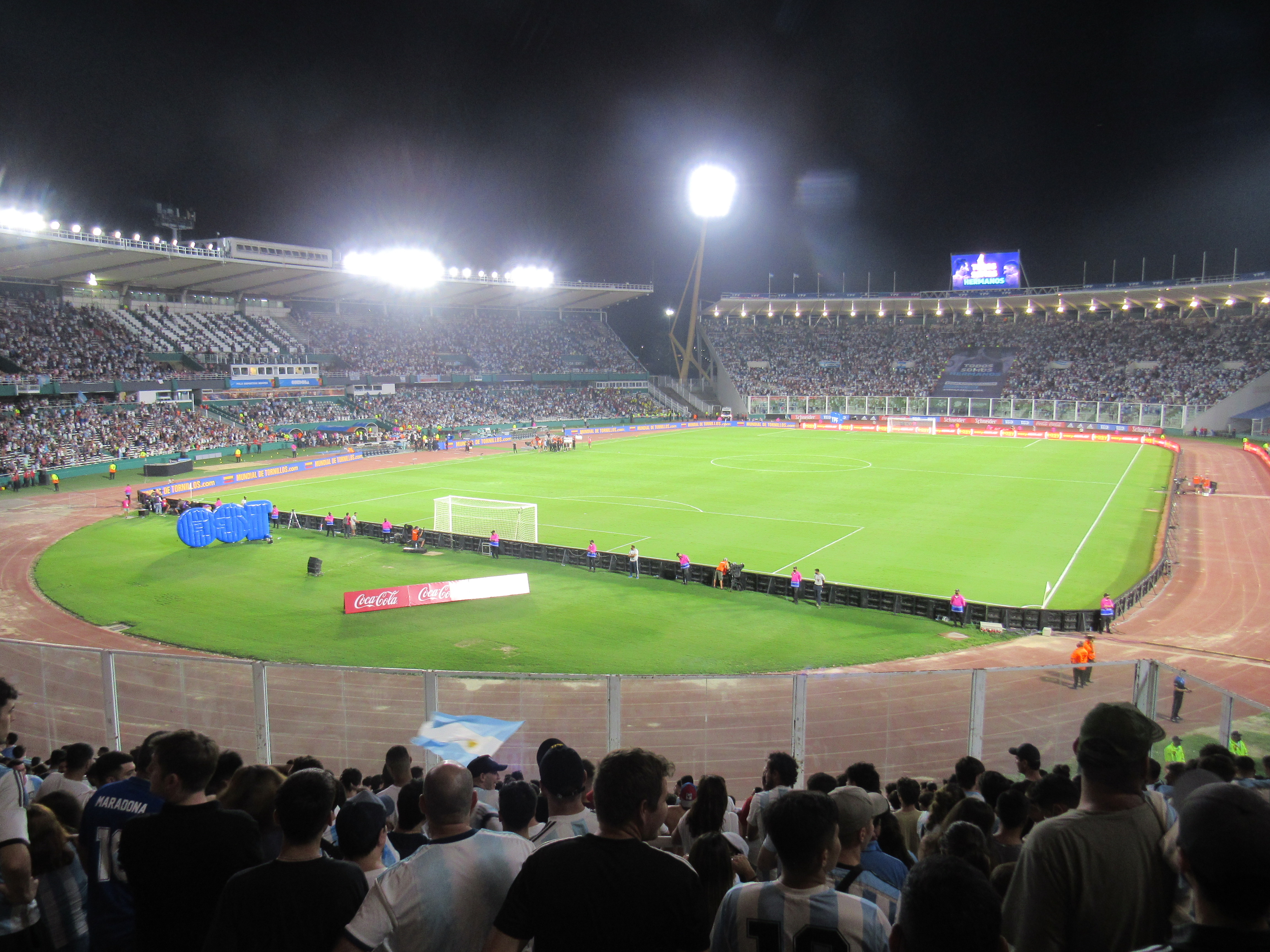
- Night view of the stadium in 2022
- Interactive map of Mario Alberto Kempes Stadium
- Former names: Estadio Córdoba (1978–2010)
- Address: Av. Cárcano s/n Córdoba; Argentina
- Owner: Córdoba Province
- Operator: Government of Córdoba
- Capacity: 57,000
- Surface: Grass
- Record attendance: Talleres 1–0 San Jorge; 6 May 2013
- Field size: 105 x 70 m
- Current use: Football; Rugby union; Concerts

Construction
- Built: 1976–1978
- Opened: 16 May 1978; 48 years ago
- Renovated: 2020
- Expanded: 2010–11
- Architect: Sánchez Elía-Peralta Ramos

Tenants
- C.A. Talleres (1978–present) (Note: The club uses it as home venue due to the low capacity of its own stadium.); C.A. Belgrano (1978–present) (Note: Used as home venue only for matches with high attendances.); C.A. Racing (1978–present); Instituto A.C.C. (1978–present); Argentina national football team (1980–present); Argentina national rugby team (2005–present); Rally Argentina (2006–07); Unión Cordobesa de Rugby (1985–96)

The Estadio Mario Alberto Kempes, formerly known as Chateau Carreras and Estadio Córdoba, is a stadium in the Chateau Carreras neighborhood of Córdoba, Argentina. Owned by the Córdoba Province, the venue is used mostly for association football and rugby union matches and also sometimes for athletics.

The stadium was inaugurated in 1978 for the 1978 FIFA World Cup, with a capacity for 37,851 spectators although it does not provide seating for all of them, like many Argentine stadiums.

Most football teams in Córdoba have their own stadiums but they usually prefer playing in this stadium for its size and comfort, especially when playing important games that attract big crowds. Generally, this stadium is used for Talleres' matches, and is used for Belgrano's, Instituto's and Racing's matches. The Argentina national football team home matches have also been played here.

In October 2010 the name was changed to honour Mario Kempes, former Argentina national team player and top goal scorer of the 1978 FIFA World Cup, who was also a native of Córdoba. The Mario Kempes stadium was later refurbished in preparation for the 2011 Copa América, and re-inaugurated on 26 July 2011.

== History ==
The construction of the stadium was commissioned to "Sánchez Elía-Peralta Ramos" Architects studio of Buenos Aires, which then associated with architects of Córdoba to carry out the project. In 1976, the military government of Argentina led by Jorge Rafael Videla, created a self-governing entity ("EAM 78") that took over the remodelation and construction of stadiums and buildings for the 1978 FIFA World Cup that would be held in Argentina.

Apart from Estadio Olímpico, other stadiums to be refurbished for the World Cup were River Plate, Vélez Sarsfield, Ciudad de Mendoza, Mar del Plata Stadium. Since the projects were launched, costs of constructions raised to US$ 520 million, five times higher than 1982 World Cup.

The stadium was finally inaugurated on 16 May 1978, in a match where Argentina played a local combined. The first World Cup held in the Chateau Carreras stadium was the Peru 3 v Scotland 1, on 3 June.

In 2006 and 2007 the stadium hosted some Special Stages of Rally Argentina, a round of the World Rally Championship.

In October 2010 the Legislature of Córdoba Province approved the change of name of the stadium to "Mario Alberto Kempes" to honor the former footballer born in the province. That changed had been driven by local journalist Claudio Menditto on his article "A tribute for Matador", published in 2008.

During 2010 and 2011 the stadium went through a remodelling process. The field was sunken 4 metres, the iconic Autotrol scoreboards installed for the 1978 World Cup were replaced with modern video screens, new stands were built to improve the poor view caused by the shallow shape of the stadium and the capacity was increased to 57,000, becoming the third largest stadium in Argentina by seating capacity. It was re-opened on 26 June 2011, just 5 days before the start of the 2011 Copa América. Works included positioning of roof on grandstands, and an expansion to 57,000 spectators. Besides, all the lightning was renovated. The stands were fully covered after the cup.

The record attendance of the stadium dates to 6 May 2013, when in the 9th. round of 2012–13 Torneo Argentino A Talleres defeated Tucumano' team San Jorge, earning promotion to Primera Nacional in front of 62,000 spectators.

== Sporting events ==
=== 1978 FIFA World Cup ===
During the 1978 FIFA World Cup, the stadium hosted two Group 2 matches, three Group 4 matches and three more during second round.

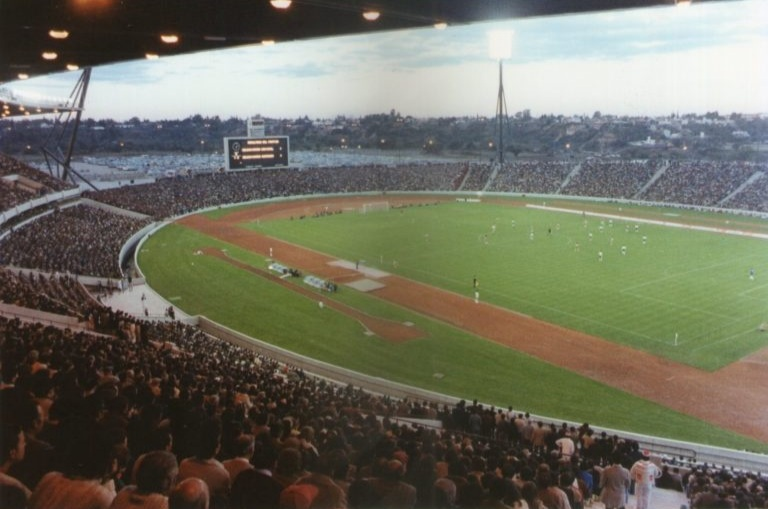
The stadium during a 1978 FIFA World Cup match

Date	Round	Group	Team 1	Score	Team 2
3 June	1	4	Peru	3–1	Scotland
6 June	1	2	West Germany	6–0	Mexico
7 June	1	4	Scotland	1–1	Iran
10 June	1	2	West Germany	0–0	Tunisia
11 June	1	4	Peru	4–1	Iran
14 June	2	A	Netherlands	5–1	Austria
18 June	2	A	West Germany	2–2	Netherlands
21 June	2	A	Austria	3–2	West Germany

=== Other football events ===
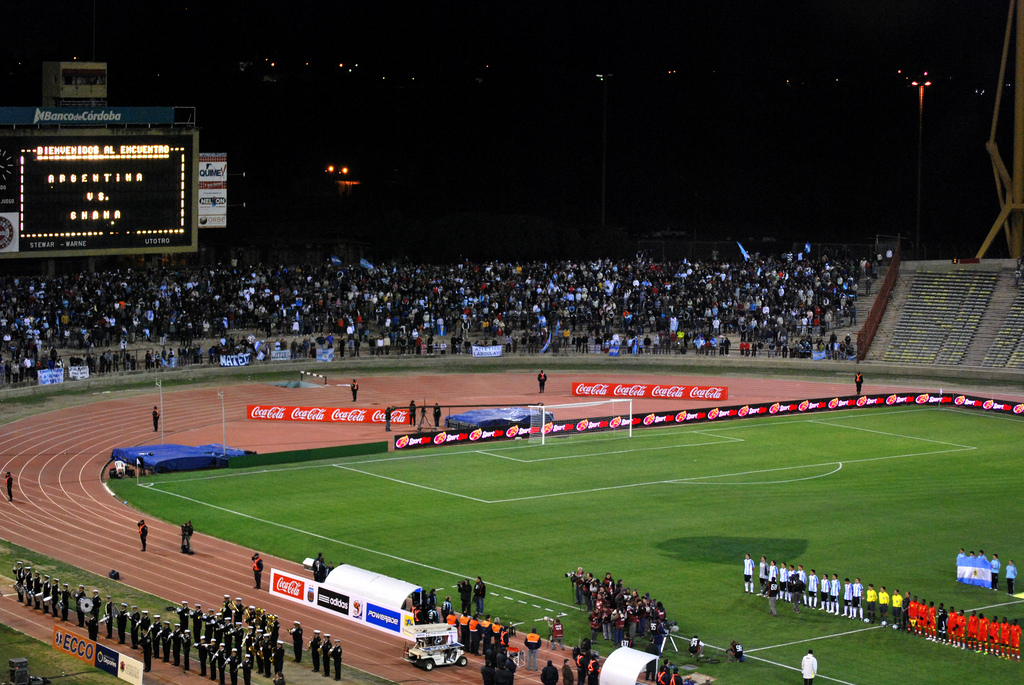
The stadium during a friendly between Argentina and Ghana in 2009. This picture was taken before its remodelling

The Mario Kempes Stadium hosted three Group B matches and a semi-final match during the 1987 Copa América; five group stage matches, two round of 16 matches, a quarter-final match and a semi-final match at the 2001 FIFA World Youth Championship and at the 2011 Copa America, the stadium hosted two Group B matches, one Group A match and a quarter-final match.

The stadium also held the 2015 and 2016 finals of the Copa Argentina, and the 2015 Supercopa Argentina. Besides, the stadium hosted the 2020, where Defensa y Justicia were crowned champions after beating Lanús 3–0, and 2022 finals of Copa Sudamericana.

In 2022 the Stadium Mario Kempes hosted the Copa de la Liga Profesional final between Boca Juniors and Tigre.

=== Rugby union ===
Mario Kempes Stadium has hosted several rugby union games of the Argentina national team. Likewise, Unión Cordobesa de Rugby used the stadium for defining instances of its annual championship, as well as its representative team played several matches against touring national sides.

Date	Event	Home team	Score	Away team	Ref.
22 Oct 1985	New Zealand tour	Córdoba RU	9–72	New Zealand	
21 Jun 1988	France tour	Córdoba RU	9–42	France	
10 Jun 1996	France tour	Córdoba RU	22–19	France	
18 Jun 2005	Italy tour	Argentina	29–30	Italy	
16 Jun 2012	France tour	Argentina	23–20	France	
16 Aug 2025	Rugby Championship	Argentina	24–41	New Zealand	
4 Jul 2026	Nations Championship	Argentina	38–47	Scotland	

=== Other sporting events ===
The 1982 World Boxing Association world Super-Bantamweight title fight between champion Sergio Palma and former WBA world Bantamweight champion Jorge Luján was held there. The fight was won by Palma on a unanimous decision after 15 rounds.

== Facilities ==
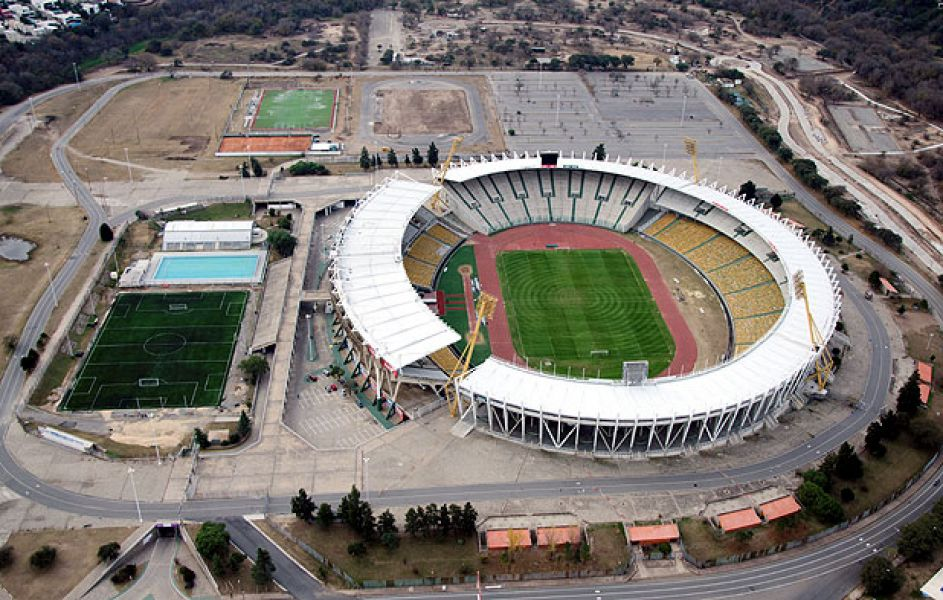
Aerial view of the complete "Polo Deportivo Kempes" sports complex

The Mario Alberto Kempes Stadium is the center of a 40 hectares park and sports complex named Polo Deportivo Kempes, that includes the "Soledad García" provincial field hockey stadium, opened in 2012, that honors the two times world champion Soledad García; an Olympic-size swimming pool, opened in 2014 and named after the olympic medallist Georgina Bardach; an auxiliar field, located north of the main stadium, that hosts training and smaller football and rugby events; a BMX circuit, a running track, and basketball, volleyball and tennis facilities.

Since 2019, Polo Deportivo Kempes has hosted the Córdoba Open, a men's ATP World Tour 250 series tournament played on outdoor clay courts.

== Concerts ==
Music concerts hosted at the Mario Kempes stadium include:

Country	Artist	Year	Ref.
USA	Gloria Gaynor	1978	
ARG	Sandro	1980	
ITA	Franco Simone	1980	
ARG	Palito Ortega	1980	
MEX	Luis Miguel	1982, 1992, 1994, 1996, 1997, 1999, 2003, 2008	
ARG	Sumo	1986, 1987, 1988	
ARG	Soda Stereo	1987, 1990, 1991, 2007	
SWE	Roxette	1992	
ARG	Serú Girán	1992	
BRA	Xuxa	1992	
UK	Peter Gabriel	1993	
UK	Duran Duran	1993	
USA	Bon Jovi	1993	
USA	Aerosmith	1994	
PRI	Ricky Martin	1995	
SPA	Alejandro Sanz	2001	
ARG	Los Redondos	2001	
ARG	La Renga	2003, 2008	
ARG	Callejeros	2006	
SPA	Joaquín Sabina and Joan Manuel Serrat	2007	
ARG	Los Fabulosos Cadillacs	2008	
MEX	Maná	2007, 2011	
GUA	Ricardo Arjona	2010, 2012, 2014	
COL	Shakira	2011, 2025	
USA	Madonna	2012	
URU	No Te Va Gustar	2013	
CAN	Justin Bieber	2013	
USA	Romeo Santos	2015	
UK	Iron Maiden	2016	
UK	Paul McCartney	2016, 2024	
ARG	Tini	2022, 2026	

== See also ==
- List of association football stadiums by capacity

== Notes ==
Preceded by various venues in Germany	FIFA World Cup; 1978	Succeeded by various venues in Spain
Preceded by various venues in Nigeria	FIFA U-20 World Cup; Venue; 2001	Succeeded by various venues in United Arab Emirates
Preceded by Estadio Gral. Rojas; Asunción	Copa Sudamericana; Final Venue; 2020	Succeeded by Estadio Centenario; Montevideo
Preceded by Estadio Centenario; Montevideo	Copa Sudamericana; Final Venue; 2022	Succeeded by Estadio Domingo Burgueño; Maldonado
