= Uno (Enrique Santos Discépolo and Mariano Mores song) =

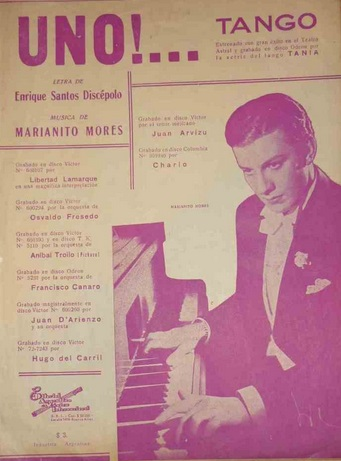

Song by Enrique Santos Discépolo and Mariano Mores
- Released: 1943
- Genre: Tango
- Songwriters: Enrique Santos Discépolo; Mariano Mores

"Uno" (One) is a 1943 tango with lyrics by Enrique Santos Discépolo and music by Mariano Mores.

== Message ==
The lyrics commence: "Uno busca lleno de esperanzas el camino que los sueños prometieron a sus ansias". The message deals with a man who is fearful of falling in love again as a woman played with his feelings.

== Versions ==
- It was among the tango standards selected by Plácido Domingo for his 1981 album Plácido Domingo Sings Tangos.
- Selected by Julio Iglesias for his 1992 album Calor and again for his 1996 tango tribute Tango and covered to French (Je oublie que je t'aime), Italian (se ora avessi un po' di te) and Portuguese (Sonho Triste) version * Sung by Luis Miguel for his 1997 album Romances.
