= Segundo Romance =

1994 studio album by Luis Miguel

Studio album by Luis Miguel
- Released: 30 August 1994
- Recorded: 1994
- Studios: Record Plant Studios, Los Angeles, California, US
- Genre: Bolero
- Length: 38:57
- Language: Spanish
- Label: WEA Latina
- Producers: Luis Miguel; Armando Manzanero; Juan Carlos Calderón; Kiko Cibrian

Luis Miguel chronology
Aries (1993)	Segundo Romance (1994)	El Concierto (1995)

Singles from Segundo Romance
- 1. "El Día Que Me Quieras" Released: August 1994; 2. "La Media Vuelta" Released: November 1994; 3. "Todo y Nada" Released: 1995; 4. "Delirio" Released: April 1995

Segundo Romance (English: Second Romance) is the tenth studio album by Mexican singer Luis Miguel, released on 30 August 1994 through WEA Latina. Like Luis Miguel's 1991 album Romance, Segundo Romance comprises cover versions of boleros (Latin ballads) written between 1934 and 1993. It was produced by Luis Miguel with Juan Carlos Calderón, Kiko Cibrian and Armando Manzanero and recorded in early 1994 at the Record Plant in Los Angeles.

Luis Miguel promoted the album with tours in the United States and Latin America from August to December 1994. Four singles were released: "El Día Que Me Quieras", "La Media Vuelta", "Todo y Nada", and "Delirio". The former two reached the top of the Billboard Hot Latin Songs chart in the United States.

Segundo Romance received positive reviews from music critics, who praised its production, Luis Miguel's vocals and the choice of songs. It won several awards, including the Grammy Award for Best Latin Pop Performance. By 1995, Segundo Romance had sold over 4.5 million copies and achieved multi-platinum status in many Latin American countries and Spain, and was certified platinum in the United States. Like its predecessor, the album helped continue renewing mainstream interest in bolero music.

== Background and recording ==
In 1991, Luis Miguel released his eighth studio album, Romance, a collection of classic boleros (slow ballads "endowed with romantic lyrics"). The album was successful in Latin America and sold more than six million copies worldwide. It revived interest in the bolero genre and was the first record by a Spanish-speaking artist to be certified gold in Brazil, Taiwan and the United States. Despite its success, Luis Miguel did not immediately release another album of boleros as the follow-up album. Instead, he recorded Aries (1993), an album comprising original pop ballads and dance songs with R&B influences. Four months after the release of Aries, he confirmed that he would begin recording another collection of classic boleros in March 1994, with the working title Romance II.

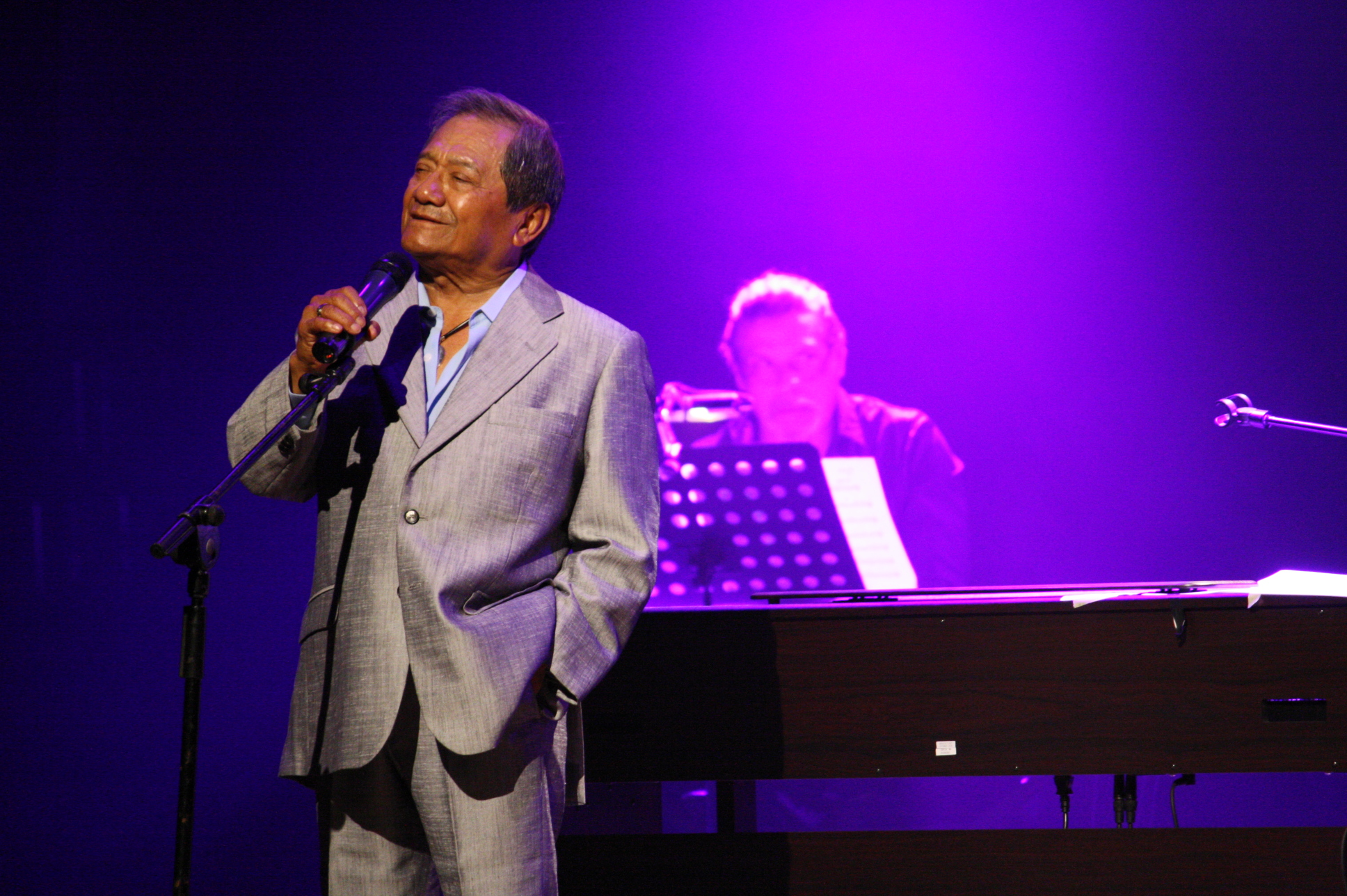
Mexican singer-songwriter Armando Manzanero (pictured) assisted production of Segundo Romance, as he had done with Romance. The album features covers of three Manzanero compositions: "Somo Novios", "Cómo Yo Te Amé", and "Yo Sé Que Volverás".

Segundo Romance was recorded at the Record Plant in Los Angeles, chosen for its state-of-the-art recording facilities. Its title was announced in June 1994. Luis Miguel co-produced the album with Armando Manzanero (who produced Romance), Juan Carlos Calderón (who produced Luis Miguel's albums prior to Romance) and Kiko Cibrian (who co-produced Aries). Manzanero helped with arrangements and song selection, Calderón was involved with the string section and Cibrian with music direction.

The song "Lo Mejor de Mí", composed by Rudy Pérez, was considered for inclusion on the album, but Luis Miguel decided against recording it as he felt the song would work better as a ballad for his next album, rather than as a bolero.

=== Musical style ===
"El Día Que Me Quieras"
A 22-second sample from Luis Miguel's cover of "El Día Que Me Quieras", a tango originally recorded by Carlos Gardel. The track's opening, which features a "romantic accordion", sets the "tone for the rest of the set", according to AllMusic critic Jose F. Promis.

Segundo Romance comprises 11 cover versions of classic boleros, the oldest dating to 1934. The arrangements consist of strings, saxophone solos, and a piano. Other styles include covers of Carlos Gardel and Alfredo Le Pera's tango "El Día Que Me Quieras", which uses a bandoneon (an accordion from Argentina), and the ranchera-bolero "La Media Vuelta" by José Alfredo Jiménez, which features horns, strings, and Spanish guitars. The album features covers of three songs composed by Manzanero: "Somos Novios", "Cómo Yo Te Amé", and "Yo Sé Que Volverás".

== Singles ==
"El Día Que Me Quieras" was released as the album's lead single on 5 August 1994. It reached number one on the Billboard Hot Latin Songs chart in the United States for the week of 17 September 1994, and remained there for five weeks. The track also topped the ballads chart in Mexico. Its music video was directed by Kiko Guerrero and filmed at the Palacio de Bellas Artes in Mexico City with Luis Miguel and a 36-piece orchestra. "La Media Vuelta", the second single, was released in November 1994 and reached number one on the Hot Latin Songs chart for the week of 26 November, topping the chart for three weeks. It became the second single to reach number on the ballads chart in Mexico. The song's music video, directed by Pedro Torres and filmed in black-and-white, features Luis Miguel reminiscing at a bar about a woman who deceived him. The third single, "Todo y Nada", reached number three on the Hot Latin Songs and number one on the Billboard Latin Pop Airplay charts in the US and number three on the ballads chart in Mexico."Todo y Nada" was featured as the main theme for the Mexican telenovela Imperio de cristal (1994). "Delirio", the fourth single, peaked at number 16 on the Hot Latin Songs chart; its music video was filmed in Brazil.

== Promotion ==
To promote the album, Luis Miguel began his Segundo Romance Tour in August 1994 with 16 shows at the National Auditorium in Mexico City, which drew a total audience of more than 155,000. Luis Miguel performed throughout Mexico, the United States, Peru and Argentina until 31 December 1994, when the tour concluded in Acapulco. The first part of Luis Miguel's set list featured pop songs and contemporary ballads; during the second half he sang boleros from Segundo Romance and ranchera songs, before closing with "Será Que No Me Amas", the Spanish version of the Jackson 5's "Blame It on the Boogie".

In October 1995, Warner Music released the El Concierto live album and video, a compilation of Luis Miguel's performances at the National Auditorium in Mexico City and his concert at the José Amalfitani Stadium in Buenos Aires. Stephen Thomas Erlewine of AllMusic praised its production and Luis Miguel's performance.

== Critical reception ==
Professional ratings
Review scores
Source	Rating
AllMusic	4.5/5 stars
Los Angeles Times	3/4 stars

AllMusic critic Jose F. Promis gave Segundo Romance four-and-a-half stars out of five, calling it "a first-rate collection of timeless Latin American standards" and praised Luis Miguel's vocals and the production. According to Promis, the album "further established Luis Miguel as a first-rate balladeer, and enhanced his immense international popularity, not only with the youth market, but with an older, more sophisticated market as well." Enrique Lopetegui of the Los Angeles Times gave the album three stars out of four, saying that it contained "updated, well-produced versions of classic romantic bolero and tango songs". In Americas magazine, Mark Holston described Segundo Romance as a "superb encore", citing "El Día Que Me Quieras" and "Historia de un Amor" as "memorable songs". Though Billboard reviewer Paul Verna wrote that it offered "few surprises," he praised Luis Miguel's "scrumptious, sophisti-pop take of 'Nosotros' and 'Delirio'." Mario Tarradell of the Miami Herald was less pleased with the album, writing that it "pales in comparison to the original". Tarradell criticized Luis Miguel's vocals being "on autopilot" compared to his "rich, sophisticated hues" on Romance and called the singer's production a "bad idea".

=== Accolades ===
In Argentina, Luis Miguel received the Asociación de Cronistas del Espectáculo award for Latin Ballad Album by a Male Solo Artist in 1994. At the 1995 Grammy Awards Segundo Romance won the Best Latin Pop Performance award despite competition from Cristian Castro, Juan Gabriel, La Mafia and Plácido Domingo, the latter who was favored to win by John Lannert of Billboard for his album De Mi Alma Latina. At the seventh Lo Nuestro Awards that year, Luis Miguel won Pop Male Artist of the Year, Pop Album of the Year, and Video of the Year for "La Media Vuelta"; "El Día Que Me Quieras" was nominated for Pop Song of the Year. Segundo Romance won the award for the Pop Album of the Year by a Male Artist at the 1995 Billboard Latin Music Awards, and was named Best Album of the Year by the Association of Latin Entertainment Critics. Luis Miguel was the Best-Selling Latin Artist of the Year at the 1995 World Music Awards.

== Commercial performance ==
Segundo Romance was released on 30 August 1994. Within two days, the album sold more than one million copies worldwide. In the United States, it debuted at number 29 on the Billboard 200 the week of 10 September 1994, the highest debut on the chart at the time for a Spanish-language album. That week, Segundo Romance also debuted at number seven on the Billboard Top Latin Albums chart; it reached number one a week later, replacing Selena's Amor Prohibido. It spent a total of 29 nonconsecutive weeks atop the chart, and was the second-bestselling Latin album of the year behind Mi Tierra by Gloria Estefan. The album topped the Billboard Latin Pop Albums chart for 30 weeks, and was the highest-selling Latin pop album of the year in the U.S. According to Nielsen SoundScan, the record has sold 603,000 copies in the US as of October 2017, making the 21st bestselling Latin album in the country. Segundo Romance was certified platinum for shipping one million copies, making Luis Miguel the first Latin artist to have two certified platinum albums in the U.S. following Romance.

The album was also successful in Spanish-speaking countries. It was certified quintuple platinum in Mexico, triple platinum in Paraguay and Uruguay as well as in Central America; double platinum in Bolivia, Colombia, Peru, Spain and Venezuela, and platinum in Ecuador. In Brazil, Segundo Romance was certified gold for sales of 100,000 copies. The album reached number one on the Chilean album charts, and was certified diamond for shipping 250,000 copies. In Argentina, it was certified 11× platinum and later received a diamond award for sales of 500,000 copies. By 1995, Segundo Romance had sold over 4.5 million copies worldwide.

== Legacy ==
Like its predecessor, Segundo Romance helped to revive interest in bolero music. Mark Holston wrote that the album "proves again that the bolero is back, its heart beating as strongly as ever, its soul alive with tropical passion, a music for every time and all times". According to Enrique Lopetegui of the Los Angeles Times, both albums "created a revival for the bolero – the old-fashioned, string-based romantic messages of unrequited love were embraced even by young listeners". Ed Morales wrote in his book The Latin Beat: The Rhythms and Roots of Latin Music from Bossa Nova to Salsa and Beyond: "Beyond merely being a revival, Romance and its 1994 follow-up, Segundo Romance was a significant update of the genre". Chicago Tribune editor Achy Obejas noted that the albums "scored in such unlikely places as Saudi Arabia and Finland". Segundo Romance was followed by two more bolero albums: Romances (1997) and Mis Romances (2001). In 1998, Romance, Segundo Romance, and Romances were compiled on Todos Los Romances, released by WEA Latina.

== Track listing ==
All tracks produced by Luis Miguel, Manzanero, Calderón, and Cibrian.

No.	Title	Lyrics	Music	Year of composition	Length
1.	"El Día Que Me Quieras"	Carlos Gardel	Alfredo Le Pera	1934	3:58
2.	"Sin Ti"	Pepe Guízar	Guízar	1940	3:00
3.	"Somos Novios"	Armando Manzanero	Manzanero	1968	3:10
4.	"La Media Vuelta"	José Alfredo Jiménez	Jiménez	1963	2:42
5.	"Solamente una Vez"	Agustín Lara	Lara	1941	2:58
6.	"Todo y Nada"	Vicente Garrido	Garrido	1957	3:35
7.	"Historia de un Amor"	Carlos E. Almarán	Almarán	1955	3:55
8.	"Cómo Yo Te Amé"	Manzanero	Manzanero	1986	3:30
9.	"Nosotros"	Pedro Junco	Junco	1943	4:00
10.	"Yo Sé Que Volverás"	Luis Pérez Sabido	Manzanero	1993	3:35
11.	"Delirio"	César Portillo de la Luz	Portillo de la Luz	1956	4:34

== Personnel ==
The following information is from AllMusic and from the Segundo Romance liner notes.

=== Performance credits ===
- Robbie Buchanan – piano, keyboards
- Jodi Burnett – cello
- Kenneth Burward-Hoy – viola
- Andrea Byers – violin
- Darius Campo – violin
- Ignacio "Kiko" Cibrian – acoustic guitar ("Delirio", "Historia de un Amor", "Todo y Nada"), co-producer
- Luis Conte – percussion
- Larry Corbett – cello
- Rollice Dale – viola
- Isabelle Daskoff – violin
- Mario Diaz de Leon – violin
- Brian Dembow – viola
- George Doering – acoustic guitar
- Bruce Donnelly – cello
- Kirstin Fife – violin
- Ramón Flores – trumpet ("La Media Vuelta")
- Matt Funes – viola
- Harris Goldman – violin
- Joseph Goodman – violin
- Endre Granat – violin
- Gary Grant – brass horn
- Jerry Hey – brass horn
- Dan Higgins – brass horn
- Tiffany Hu – violin
- Paul Jackson, Jr. – electric guitar
- Anne Karam – cello
- Suzie Katayama – cello
- Leslie Kats – violin
- Armen Ksadjikian – cello
- Natalie Leggett – violin
- Brian Leonard – violin
- Francisco Loyo – piano, keyboards ("El Día Que Me Quieras")
- Michael Markman – violin
- Luis Miguel – lead vocalist, main producer
- Jorge Moraga – viola
- Tommy Morgan – harmonica ("Solamente una Vez")
- Jeff Nathanson – saxophone ("Nosotros")
- Carolyn Osborn – violin
- Delia Park – violin
- Barbara Porter – violin
- Karie Prescott – viola
- Debra Price – violin
- Bill Reichenbach Jr. – brass horn
- John "J.R." Robinson – drums
- Jay Rosen – violin
- Mark Sazer – violin
- John Scanlon – viola
- Frederick Seykora – cello
- Kwihee Shambanari – violin
- Earl Smith – oboe
- Ramón Stagnaro – vihuela, requinto
- Neil Stubenhaus – bass guitar
- Jorge Travisano – bandoneon ("El Día Que Me Quieras")
- Francine Walsh – violin
- Vivian Wolf – violin

=== Technical credits ===
- Craig Brock – assistant engineer, mixing assistant
- Juan Carlos Calderón – co-producer
- Alfredo Gatica – art direction, art coordinator
- Bernie Grundman – mastering
- Brandon Harris – engineer, assistant Engineer
- Armando Manzanero – co-producer
- Brian Pollack – engineer, assistant engineer
- Jose L. Quintana – production coordination
- Rick Raponi – engineer, assistant engineer
- Robbes Stieglitz – engineer, assistant engineer
- Phil Smith – assistant engineer
- Carlos Somonte – photography
- Paul McKenna – engineer, mixing

== Charts ==
=== Weekly charts ===
Weekly chart performance for Segundo Romance
Chart (1994)	Peak position
Argentine Albums (CAPIF)	1
Chilean Albums (IFPI)	1
Spanish Albums (PROMUSICAE)	33
US Billboard 200	29
US Top Latin Albums (Billboard)	1
US Latin Pop Albums (Billboard)	1
US Cashbox Top 100 Pop Albums	27

=== All-time charts ===
All-time chart performance for Segundo Romance
Chart (1993–2018)	Position
US Top Latin Albums (Billboard)	4

=== Year-end charts ===
Year-end chart performance for Segundo Romance
Chart (1994)	Position
Argentine Albums (CAPIF)	1
Mexican Albums (AMPROFON)	1
US Top Latin Albums (Billboard)	2
US Latin Pop Albums (Billboard)	1

Chart (1995)	Position
US Top Latin Albums (Billboard)	4
US Latin Pop Albums (Billboard)	3

Chart (1996)	Position
US Top Latin Albums (Billboard)	20
US Latin Pop Albums (Billboard)	15

Chart (1997)	Position
US Top Latin Catalog Albums (Billboard)	9

== Certifications and sales ==
Region	Certification	Certified units/sales
Argentina (CAPIF)	Diamond	813,082
Bolivia	2× Platinum	
Brazil (Pro-Música Brasil)	Gold	100,000^{*}
Central America (CFC)	3× Platinum	
Chile	Diamond	325,000
Colombia	2× Platinum	120,000
Ecuador	Platinum	
Mexico (AMPROFON) 1994 Sales	5× Platinum	2,000,000
Paraguay	3× Platinum	
Perú (IFPI Perú)	2× Platinum	40,000
Spain (Promusicae)	2× Platinum	200,000^{^}
United States (RIAA)	Platinum	603,000
Uruguay (CUD)	3× Platinum	18,000^{^}
Venezuela	2× Platinum	
Summaries
Worldwide 1994 Sales	—	4,500,000
^{*} Sales figures based on certification alone.^{^} Shipments figures based on certification alone.

== See also ==
- 1994 in Latin music
- List of best-selling albums in Argentina
- List of best-selling albums in Chile
- List of best-selling albums in Colombia
- List of best-selling albums in Mexico
- List of best-selling Latin albums
- List of best-selling Latin albums in the United States
- List of diamond-certified albums in Argentina
- List of fastest-selling albums
- List of number-one Billboard Top Latin Albums from the 1990s
- List of number-one Billboard Latin Pop Albums from the 1990s
