= Pedro Junco =

Cuban composer (1920–1943)

Pedro Junco Jr.
- Born: 22 February 1920; Pinar del Río, Cuba
- Died: 25 April 1943 (aged 23); Pinar del Río, Cuba

Pedro Junco Jr. (born as Pedro Buenaventura Jesus del Junco-Redondas, 22 February 1920 – 25 April 1943) was a Cuban composer. He composed many boleros such as "Estoy Triste, "Soy Como Soy", "Me lo Dijo el Mar", "Quisiera", "Tus Ojos" and his most famous song "Nosotros". He was the first of three sons born to Pedro Nicolás del Junco-Valdés and María Regla Redondas-Rios.

== "Nosotros" ==
His song "Nosotros" was first sung in February 1943 by the singer Tony Chiroldes on the radio station from Pinar del Río CMAB. Since then, "Nosotros" has been sung by more than 400 artists such as Sara Montiel, Plácido Domingo and Luis Miguel.

"Nosotros"

Atiéndeme, Quiero decirte algo, Que quizás no esperes, - Doloroso tal vez,

Escúchame, Que aunque me duela el alma, Yo necesito hablarte, Y así lo haré.

Nosotros... Que fuimos tan sinceros, Que desde que nos vimos, Amándonos estamos..

Nosotros, Que del amor hicimos, Un sol maravilloso, Romance tan divino...

Nosotros, Que nos queremos tanto, Debemos separarnos, No me preguntes más...

No es falta de cariño, Te quiero con el alma, Te juro que te adoro, Y en nombre de este amor Y por tu bien...

Te digo adiós.

== Death ==
According to his friend, Aldo Martínez Malo, the author of Pedro Junco—Viaje A La Memoria, "On March 9, 1939, while studying at home, he coughs and spits blood. On April 3, he visited the doctor. He then had to rest at home where I visited him. Already in 1943, he seemed to be all right, but on April he had the same problem again and then he was admitted to Damas de la Covadonga clinic in Havana. On April 25, at approximately 10:00pm, he heard the radio premiere of his song "Soy Como Soy" by René Cabel, and some minutes later he dies." He died of tuberculosis and is interred at the Catholic Cemetery in Pinar del Río.
