= Kiko Cibrian =

Kiko Cibrián
- Born: Ignacio Cibrián Galindo; 3 February 1959 (age 67); Tijuana, Mexico
- Occupations: Guitarist, composer, arranger, record producer
- Instrument: guitar

Ignacio "Kiko" Cibrián is a Mexican-American guitarist, composer, arranger, record producer, recording engineer, and mixer known for his work with Luis Miguel, Cristian Castro, Rocío Dúrcal, Reik, Frank Sinatra and Jesús Adrian Romero . Cibrián has won one Grammy Award and three Latin Grammy Awards.

== Early life and career ==
Kiko Cibrián was born and grew up in Tijuana, Mexico, where his father played in mariachis. At age 14, Cibrián started playing boleros and mariachi music. During his late teenage years, he joined a local band and was introduced to jazz by the band's saxophonist.

At 19, he was invited to go to Las Vegas to play with a band called "Santa Fe". During his time in Las Vegas, Cibrián also played with the University of Nevada, Las Vegas' big band.

In 1982, Cibrián moved to California to play with the band that accompanied dance performances at Disneyland. A year later, in San Diego, he joined the band "People Movers" where Nathan East played the electric bass. Cibrián returned to the Disneyland band in 1987 and then formed the band "True Stories".

In 1990, he moved to Mexico City to work with Luis Miguel as guitarist. That same year, Cibrián was invited to be the producer for Cristian Castro's debut album Agua nueva. It was his first time producing an album for another artist. Cibrián's second album as a producer was Luis Miguel's 1993 Aries which won a Grammy Award for Best Latin Pop Album. He composed the hit single "Suave" from that same album. Cibrián continued working with Luis Miguel as touring musician, producer, composer and arranger throughout the 1990s and 2000s.

== Selected discography ==
Year	Album	Artist	Credits
1992	Kiko	Kiko Cibrián	Producer, composer, arranger, guitar
1992	Agua Nueva	Cristian Castro	Producer, arranger, vocals
1993	Aries	Luis Miguel	Producer, composer, arranger, guitar, vocals
1994	Duets II	Frank Sinatra	Vocal producer
1994	Segundo Romance	Luis Miguel	Producer, arranger, guitar
1995	El Concierto	Luis Miguel	Producer, composer, arranger, guitar
1996	Nada Es Igual	Luis Miguel	Producer, composer, arranger, guitar, synthesizer, programming
1996	The Hunchback of Notre Dame [Spanish Soundtrack]	Alan Menken	Translation, adaptation
2003	Señor Bolero 2	José Feliciano	Composer
2003	Caramelito	Rocío Dúrcal	Composer
2004	Buena suerte	Isabel Pantoja	Composer
2005	Reik	Reik	Engineer, arranger, guitar, piano, keyboards, programming
2005	El aire de tu casa	Jesús Adrián Romero	Arranger
2006	Sesión Metropolitana	Reik	Composer
2006	Secuencia	Reik	Engineer, arranger, guitar, programming
2007	Esta Es Mi Vida	Jesse & Joy	Producer, engineer, mixer, arranger, programming
2009	El Mismo Cielo	Marcela Gándara	Arranger, mixer
2009	El Culpable Soy Yo	Cristian Castro	Producer, engineer, mixer, arranger, guitar
2011	Peligro	Reik	Composer, arranger
2012	Soplando Vida	Jesús Adrián Romero	Arranger, mixer, cuatro
2013	Regreso a Ti	Alex Campos	Producer, mixer
2014	Soltando al Perro	Jesse & Joy	Arranger
2015	Derroche de Amor	Alex Campos	Mixer
2016	Des/Amor	Reik	Producer, arranger, programming
2017	Momentos	Alex Campos	Mixer
2017	Jesse & Joy	Jesse & Joy	Producer, engineer, mixer, arranger

== Awards ==
=== BMI Latin Awards ===
Year	Nominee / work	Award	Result
1995	"Suave"	Award-winning songs	Won
1995	"Hasta el fin"	Award-winning songs	Won
1998	"Dame"	Award-winning songs	Won
1998	"Cómo es posible que a mi lado"	Award-winning songs	Won

=== Grammy Awards ===
Year	Title	Artist	Category	Role	Result
1994	Aries	Luis Miguel	Best Latin Pop Album	Producer, composer, arranger, guitar, vocals	Won
1997	Nada Es Igual...	Luis Miguel	Best Latin Pop Album	Producer, composer, arranger, guitar, programming, synthesizer	Nominated

=== Latin Grammy Awards ===
Year	Title	Artist	Category	Role	Result
2013	Regreso a ti	Alex Campos	Best Christian Album (Spanish Language)	Producer, mixer	Won
2015	Derroche de amor	Alex Campos	Best Christian Album (Spanish Language)	Mixer	Won
2017	Momentos	Alex Campos	Best Christian Album (Spanish Language)	Mixer	Won
2022	A veces bien y a veces mal	Ricky Martin ft. Reik	Song Of The Year	Songwriter	Nominated
