= La Media Vuelta =

1963 song by José Alfredo Jiménez

Song by José Alfredo Jiménez
- Released: 1963
- Genre: Ranchera
- Songwriter: José Alfredo Jiménez

"La Media Vuelta" ("The Half Turn") is a song written and performed by Mexican singer José Alfredo Jiménez released in 1963. One of Jiménez' most famous compositions, the song has become part of the traditional Mexican musical repertoire, and has been recorded by dozens of singers and groups.

== Javier Solís version ==
The first version of the song to chart in Mexico was that of Javier Solís. His recording entered the Mexican charts on the 22 June 1963 week, peaking at number three on 20 July. The song would remain on the top 10 for almost six months, for a total of 27 weeks.

=== Weekly charts ===
Chart (1963)	Peak position
Mexico (Audiomusica)	3

== Luis Miguel version ==
"La Media Vuelta"

Single by Luis Miguel

from the album Segundo Romance
- Released: November 1994
- Genre: Bolero; ranchera
- Length: 2:42
- Label: WEA Latina
- Songwriter: José Alfredo Jiménez
- Producers: Luis Miguel; Armando Manzanero; Juan Carlos Calderón; Kiko Cibrian

Luis Miguel singles chronology
"El Día Que Me Quieras" (1994)	"La Media Vuelta" (1994)	"Todo y Nada" (1995)

It was covered by Mexican singer Luis Miguel on his album Segundo Romance where it was released as the second single from the album in November 1994 and reached number one on both the Billboard Hot Latin Songs and the Latin Pop Airplay charts. "La Media Vuelta" also became a number-one hit in Mexico and Panama; and a top-ten single in four other countries.

Luis Miguel's rendition is performed as a ranchera-bolero and features horns, strings, and Spanish guitars. Its music video, directed by Pedro Torres and filmed in black-and-white, features Miguel reminiscing at a bar about a woman who deceived him. Several Mexican celebrities including Juan Gabriel, Lola Beltrán, Amalia Mendoza, Katy Jurado, Pablo Montero, Carlos Monsiváis, Ofelia Medina and Jiménez's son made guest appearances in the video. "La Media Vuelta" won the Lo Nuestro award for Video of the Year. It was recognized as one of best-performing songs of the year at the 1996 ASCAP Latin Awards. A live version of the song was included on his album El Concierto (1995).

=== Charts ===
==== Weekly charts ====
Chart (1994–95)	Peak position
El Salvador (UPI)	10
Mexico (AMPROFON)	1
Panama (UPI)	1
Peru (UPI)	3
Puerto Rico (UPI)	10
US Hot Latin Songs (Billboard)	1
US Latin Pop Airplay (Billboard)	1
Venezuela (UPI)	7

==== Year-end charts ====
Chart (1995)	Peak position
US Latin Songs (Billboard)	10
US Latin Pop Airplay (Billboard)	11

=== Certifications ===
Region	Certification	Certified units/sales
Spain (PROMUSICAE)	Gold	30,000^{‡}
^{‡} Sales+streaming figures based on certification alone.

== Other covers ==
"La Media Vuelta" was covered by Tejano singer Michael Salgado on his album De Buenas Raíces (1996). His version peaked at number 38 on the Hot Latin Songs chart.

== See also ==
- List of number-one hits of 1994 (Mexico)
- Billboard Top Latin Songs Year-End Chart
- List of number-one Billboard Hot Latin Tracks of 1994
- List of number-one Billboard Latin Pop Airplay songs of 1994
