= Cómo Es Posible Que a Mi Lado =

1996 single by Luis Miguel

Single by Luis Miguel

from the album Nada Es Igual...
- Released: 1996
- Recorded: February 1996
- Studio: Record Plant (Los Angeles, California)
- Genre: House
- Length: 4:14
- Label: WEA Latina
- Songwriters: Kiko Cibrián; Alejandro Asensi; Luis Miguel
- Producers: Luis Miguel; Kiko Cibrian

Luis Miguel singles chronology
"Dame" (1996)	"Cómo Es Posible Que a Mi Lado" (1996)	"Que Tú Te Vas" (1996)

"Cómo Es Posible Que a Mi Lado"

Promotional single by Luis Miguel

from the album Vivo
- A-side: "Quiero"
- Released: 2001
- Recorded: 2000
- Genre: Latin pop
- Length: 3:58
- Label: WEA Latina
- Songwriters: Kiko Cibrián; Alejandro Asensi; Luis Miguel
- Producer: Luis Miguel

"Cómo Es Posible Que a Mi Lado" (English: "How Is It Possible That Beside Me") is a song by Mexican singer Luis Miguel. It was released as the second single from the album Nada Es Igual... in 1996. "Cómo Es Posible Que a Mi Lado" was recognized at the 1998 BMI Latin Awards as one of the best performing songs of the year. A live version of the song was included on the album Vivo (2000). The music video the song was directed by Pedro Torres. Dancers on video: Daisy Fuentes, Carolina Losada y Rocío Vilardell

== Charts ==
Chart (1996)	Peak position
US Hot Latin Songs (Billboard)	6
US Latin Pop Airplay (Billboard)	6
