= El día que me quieras (song) =

Tango composition by Carlos Gardel and Alfredo Le Pera

Single by Carlos Gardel
- Language: Spanish
- B-side: "Volvió una noche"
- Released: 1934
- Recorded: March 19, 1934
- Genre: Argentine tango
- Label: RCA Victor
- Composer: Carlos Gardel
- Lyricist: Alfredo Le Pera

"El día que me quieras" (English: The day that you love me) is an Argentine tango with music by Carlos Gardel and lyrics by Alfredo Le Pera. It is considered one of the most popular songs of the 20th century and one of the best Latin songs of all time. Originally featured in the 1935 film of the same name, sung by Gardel himself, it became a heavily recorded tango standard, even by artists outside of the realm of tango. It has subsequently been covered by various artists such as Luis Miguel, Julio Iglesias, Michael Bolton Roberto Carlos, Raphael de España and Shlomo Idov who translated the song to Hebrew. The song was inducted into the Latin Grammy Hall of Fame in 2001. "El día que me quieras" was honored at the 2014 La Musa Awards as "La Canción de Todos los Tiempos" ("The Song of All Times"). It was among the tango standards selected by Plácido Domingo for his 1981 album Plácido Domingo Sings Tangos. In addition to Domingo, the song has been covered by operatic tenors including José Carreras, Juan Diego Florez, Christian Ketter, and Alfredo Kraus.

== Luis Miguel version ==
"El día que me quieras"

Single by Luis Miguel

from the album Segundo Romance
- Released: August 1994
- Recorded: 1994
- Genre: Latin
- Length: 3:58
- Label: WEA
- Songwriters: Carlos Gardel; Alfredo Le Pera
- Producers: Luis Miguel; Armando Manzanero; Juan Carlos Calderón; Kiko Cibrian

Luis Miguel singles chronology
"Suave" (1993)	"El día que me quieras" (1994)	"La Media Vuelta" (1994)

Puerto Rican-born Mexican singer Luis Miguel recorded a cover version of the song on his studio album Segundo Romance (1994). It was released as the album's lead single in August 1994. This single peaked at number-one in the Billboard Hot Latin Tracks chart in 1994, one of the two songs along with "La Media Vuelta" from the album to do so. It also topped the charts in Mexico, Argentina, Panama and Peru; and reached the top-three in four other countries.

Luis Miguel's version received a nomination for Pop Song of the Year at the 1995 Lo Nuestro Awards. It was recognized as one best-performing Latin songs of the year at the 1996 BMI Latin Awards. The music video was directed by Kiko Guerrero and filmed at the Palacio de Bellas Artes in Mexico City with Miguel and a 36-piece orchestra. A live version of the song was included on his album El Concierto (1995).

=== Weekly charts ===
Chart (1994)	Peak position
Argentina (CAPIF)	1
Chile (UPI)	2
Dominican Republic (UPI)	2
El Salvador (UPI)	3
Mexico (AMPROFON)	1
Panama (UPI)	1
Peru (UPI)	1
US Hot Latin Songs (Billboard)	1
US Latin Pop Airplay (Billboard)	1
Venezuela (UPI)	3

=== Year-end charts ===
Chart (1994)	Peak position
US Hot Latin Songs (Billboard)	10

== Gloria Estefan version ==
"El día que me quieras"

Single by Gloria Estefan

from the album The Standards
- Released: 2013
- Recorded: 2013
- Genre: Traditional pop
- Label: Sony Masterworks
- Songwriters: Carlos Gardel; Alfredo Le Pera; Gloria Estefan

Gloria Estefan has written and recorded the first-ever English translation of the song ("The Day You Say You Love Me") for her 2013 album The Standards. “It was the wedding song that Emilio and I danced to!” she relates. “I wanted to record it. It was never done in English, and I wanted it to be as close to the author's version as possible and I was so inspired. Before we started doing the record, I wrote the translation. It’s always nice when you can write a standard!” Some editions of Estefan's album also include a cover with the original Spanish lyrics.

== See also ==
- List of number-one hits of 1994 (Mexico)
- Billboard Top Latin Songs Year-End Chart
- List of number-one Billboard Hot Latin Tracks of 1994
- List of number-one Billboard Latin Pop Airplay songs of 1994
