= Suave (song) =

1993 song by Luis Miguel

Single by Luis Miguel

from the album Aries
- Released: 1993
- Studio: Ocean Way (Hollywood); Record One (Los Angeles); Larrabee Sound (Hollywood); Ground Control (Los Angeles)
- Genre: Dance
- Length: 4:47
- Label: WEA Latina
- Songwriters: Kiko Cibrian; Orlando Castro
- Producers: Luis Miguel; Cibrian

Luis Miguel singles chronology
"Hasta Que Me Olvides" (1993)	"Suave" (1993)	"El Día Que Me Quieras" (1994)

Music video
- "Suave" on YouTube

"Suave" (transl. "Smooth") is a song by Mexican singer Luis Miguel from his ninth studio album, Aries (1993). The song was composed by Kiko Cibrian and Orlando Castro with the former handling its production along with the artist. It is a dance number in which the singer describes a woman who bewitches him and becomes the woman of his dreams. The song received positive reactions from two music critics. It was acknowledged as an award-winning song at the 1995 Broadcast Music Inc. (BMI) Latin Awards. Commercially, the song reached number nine on the Billboard Hot Latin Songs chart in the United States. Its music video was directed by Kiko Guerrero and filmed in Acapulco, Mexico, and features Miguel dancing in a beach with several women.

"Suave" has been covered by Puerto Rican singer Jerry Rivera in 1995 as a salsa track and Mexican entertainer Diego Boneta in 2021 as part of the soundtrack for the second season of Luis Miguel: The Series (2018). Rivera's version peaked at numbers 16 and one on the Billboard Hot Latin Songs and Tropical Airplay charts in the US, respectively. The cover was nominated in the category of Tropical Song of the Year at the 8th Lo Nuestro Award in 1996.

== Background and composition ==
"Suave"
A 27-second sample of "Suave", an "upbeat, brass-heavy, attitudinal" number.

In 1991 Miguel released his eighth studio album Romance, a collection of classic boleros. The album, which was produced by Armando Manzanero and arranged by Bebu Silvetti, was a commercial success in Latin America and sold over seven million copies worldwide. It revived interest in the bolero genre and was the first record by a Spanish-speaking artist to be certified gold in Brazil, Taiwan and the United States. In spite of the album's success, Miguel did not want to release a follow-up record that was similar to Romance. When asked why he chose not to record more boleros, he replied, "I wanted to try my music, just forgetting a little bit about those boleros that everyone knows." The singer began working with the composers for the album a year before recording in a studio in 1992; in Miguel's words, he wanted to "discuss the works, the themes, and melodies; ... The creation of an album has to be part of me or else I would not be able to interpret it, or sing in it."

On 24 August 1992, El Siglo de Torreón reported that Miguel had begun collaborating with David Foster and Juan Carlos Calderón on some compositions, along with English-speaking composers, and selecting cover versions for the album. Due to difficulty finding a suitable producer for the record, the singer decided to co-produce Aries (1993) with his long-time associate Kiko Cibrian. The final release is composed of ten tracks, four of which are dance songs that are "upbeat, brass-heavy, attitudinal numbers" including "Suave". "Suave" was composed by Cibrian and Orlando Castro and its lyrics narrate about a "seductive woman, how her smile has bewitched him...in a few words, she is the woman of his dreams". In the song, Miguel chants: "suave como me mata tu mirada, suave es el perfume de tu piel, suave son tus caricias, como siempre te soñé, como siempre te soñé" ("smooth, how you look kills, smooth, it is the perfume of your skin, smooth, it is your caress as I've always dreamed of you"). According to Castro, Miguel initially rejected the song as he did not like it, but later received a call from Cibrian with a reworked version.

== Promotion and reception ==
"Suave" was released as the album's third single in 1993 by WEA Latina. Its music video was directed by Kiko Guerrero, filmed in Acapulco, Mexico, and features Miguel dancing with several women in the beach. The song was later included on his greatest hits album Grandes Éxitos (2005). A live version of the song was featured on his live albums. AllMusic reviewer Jose F. Promis felt that Miguel "delivers to fine results" on the track along with "Dame Tu Amor" and "Que Nivel de Mujer". John Lannert of the Sun-Sentinel referred "Suave", along with "Luz Verde", as "rhythmic, romantic runes". In 2021, an editor for Terra listed it as one of the best three songs from the album. The track was listed among "10 Luis Miguel Songs You Should Know" by Emily Paulín on Sonica and "20 Best Luis Miguel Songs to Listen on YouTube Music" by an editor for El Comercio. It was acknowledged as an award-winning song at the 1995 BMI Latin Awards. "Suave" ranked at number 54 in the South American edition of the "VH1 100 Greatest Songs of the Nineties in Spanish". Commercially, it peaked at number nine on the Billboard Hot Latin Songs chart in the US and number one in Mexico according to Notitas Musicales. In 2021, Mexican entertainer Diego Boneta covered "Suave" on the soundtrack for the second season of Luis Miguel: The Series (2018).

== Track listing ==
CD Promo

1. "Suave" (radio edit) – 4:58
2. "Suave" (Instrumental Mix) – 5:29
3. "Suave" (MD's Freestyle Mix) – 7:13
4. "Suave" (MD's Freestyle Semi-Dub Mix) – 7:33
5. "Suave" (MD's Suavisimo Mix) – 7:58
6. "Suave" (Top 40 Radio Edit) – 4:30
7. "Suave" (album version) – 4:47

== Personnel ==
Adapted from the Aries liner notes:

Performance credits

- Robbie Buchanan – keyboards, arranger
- John Robinson – drums
- Kiko Cibrian – guitar, background vocals, arranger, brass arrangements
- Paulinho da Costa – percussion
- Jerry Hey – brass, brass arrangements
- Dan Higgins – brass
- Gary Grant – brass
- Bill Reichenbach Jr. – brass
- Kirk Whalum – saxophone solo
- Annie Cruz – background vocals
- Iliana Holland – background vocals
- Dan Navarro – background vocals
- Tom Bowes – background vocals

Technical credits

- Luis Miguel – producer
- Kiko Cibrian – co-producer
- Mauricio Abaroa – executive producer
- Julio Saenz – executive producer
- Benny Faccone – engineer
- Humberto Gatica – mixing
- Jim Champagne – assistant engineer, mixing assistant
- Noel Hazen – assistant engineer, mixing assistant
- Bernie Grundman – mastering
- Alfredo Gatica – artistic coordination
- Ezra Kliger – production coordination
- Jose Quintana – production coordination

== Charts ==
Chart performance for "Suave"
Chart (1993)	Peak position
Mexico (Notitas Musicales)	1
US Hot Latin Songs (Billboard)	9

== Jerry Rivera version ==
"Suave"

Promotional single by Jerry Rivera

from the album Fresco
- Released: 21 November 1995
- Studio: Charlie Dos Santos; E1212 Recording; Genesis Recording; Ocho Recording; Power Light Recording; Sir Sound Recording, NY; V, .U. Recording
- Genre: Salsa
- Length: 4:29
- Label: Sony Discos
- Songwriters: Orlando Castro; Kiko Cibrian
- Producers: Sergio George; Cuto Soto

In 1995, Puerto Rican singer Jerry Rivera covered "Suave" which was later included on his sixth studio album Fresco (1996). Rivera's version was released as a promotional single from the album on 21 November 1995 by Sony Discos. As with the tracks in the album, it is a traditional salsa number produced by Sergio George and Cuto Soto. Ramiro Burr of the Fort Worth Star-Telegram felt that George "injects a light urban touch of cool funk". In the US, the song peaked at number 16 on the Billboard Hot Latin Songs chart and became his first number one song on the Tropical Airplay chart. Rivera's version was nominated in the category of Tropical Song of the Year at the 8th Lo Nuestro Award in 1996, but ultimately lost to "Abriendo Puertas" by Gloria Estefan.

=== Weekly charts ===
Chart performance for Jerry Rivera's version
Chart (1996)	Peak position
US Hot Latin Songs (Billboard)	16
US Tropical Airplay (Billboard)	1

=== Year-end charts ===
Chart (1996)	Position
US Tropical Airplay (Billboard)	15

== See also ==
- List of number-one hits of 1994 (Mexico)
- List of Billboard Tropical Airplay number ones of 1996
