= List of awards and nominations received by Luis Miguel =

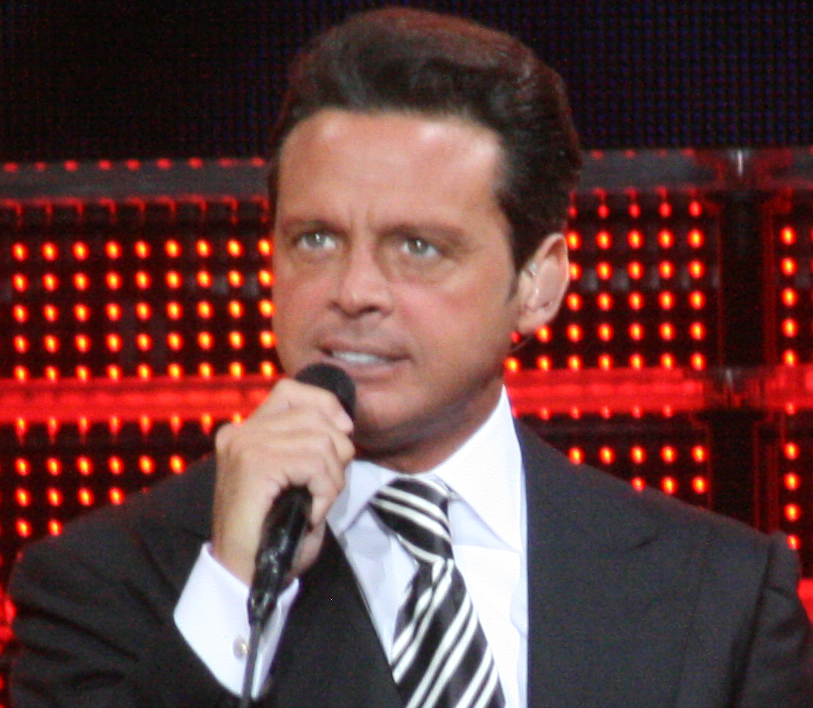
- Miguel at the Broomfield Events Center in 2008
Awards and nominations
Award	Wins	Nominations
ALMA Award	0	2
American Music Awards	0	3
ASCAP Latin Awards	10	10
Billboard Music Awards	6	6
Billboard Latin Music Awards	13	20
BMI Latin Awards	22	22
Grammy Awards	6	15
Latin Grammy Awards	6	9
Lo Nuestro Awards	11	41
MTV Video Music Awards	1	1
Pollstar Awards	0	4
Premios Juventud	4	17
Premios Oye!	1	3
World Music Awards	3	4

Totals (Note: Certain award groups do not simply award one winner. They acknowledge several different recipients, have runners-up, and have third place. Since this is a specific recognition and is different from losing an award, runner-up mentions are considered wins in this award tally. For simplification and to avoid errors, each award in this list has been presumed to have had a prior nomination.)
- Wins: 207
- Nominations: 341

Luis Miguel is a Mexican recording artist who has received many nominations and awards at the international level during his career spanning five decades. With over 60 million records sold, he is one of the best-selling Latin music artists of all-time.

Miguel began to receive major awards as a child star. He won the Premios TVyNovelas for the Best Child Singer during the inaugural event in 1983 and prominently participated in Italian's festival Un disco per l'estate of 1984. In 1985, he won his first Grammy Awards, becoming the youngest Grammy-winner male artist ever. The same year, he won his first Antorcha de Plata (Silver Torch) at the Chilean's Viña del Mar International Song Festival, and the second place at the Italian's Sanremo Music Festival with the song "Noi, ragazzi di oggi". Throughout the decade, in 1990, Miguel became the first Latin artist to receive a World Music Awards. In 1998, Miguel was nominated for the first Favorite Latin Artist at the American Music Awards. He won three Latin Grammy Awards at the inaugural edition in 2000 and has won a total of six awards from nine nominations. In addition to winning various awards at the Viña del Mar International Song Festival, he received the first Gaviota de Platino Award in its history—highest event's award.

Miguel's success and career have been recognized by various organizations. In 1989, he received an Antena de Cristal (Crystal Antenna) given by President of Mexico, Carlos Salinas de Gortari. He also won a Lifetime Award at the inaugural Lunas del Auditorio in 2002, a Lo Nuestro Excellence Award in 2003, an Achievement Award by People en Español (2012), a Diamond Award by Las Vegas International. Press Association (2013) and various recognitions by the National Auditorium of Mexico for his record-breaking concerts there. He was named Male Artist of the Century by Reforma in 1999 and Artist of the Century by Premios Latino in 2010. He also received the first "Lapislazuli disc" awards for his sales in Chile of over 1.7 million by 1999.

== Awards and nominations ==
Award/organization (Note: Charts are not included, unless they are explicitly described as "awards" or specific trophies are given.)	Year	Nominee/work	Category	Result	Ref.
ALMA Award	1999	Luis Miguel, The World Music Awards (ABC)	Outstanding performance by an individual in a music series or special	Nominated	
ALMA Award	2002	Mis Romances	Spanish-language Album of the Year	Nominated	
Asociación Latina de Periodistas de Entretenimiento (ALPE)	2010	Luis Miguel	Lesser friendly person with press	Won	
American Music Awards	1998	Luis Miguel	Favorite Latin Artist	Nominated	
American Music Awards	2003	Luis Miguel	Favorite Latin Artist	Nominated	
American Music Awards	2005	Luis Miguel	Favorite Latin Artist	Nominated	
ACE Awards (Argentina)	1993	Romance	Special Award	Honoree	
ACE Awards (Argentina)	1994	Luis Miguel	Most Popular Artist	Won	
ACE Awards (Argentina)	1994	Segundo Romance	Latin Ballad Album	Won	
Amigo Awards	1997	Luis Miguel	Best Latin Male Artist	Won	
Amigo Awards	1997	Nada Es Igual	Best Latin Album	Nominated	
Amigo Awards	1997	Romances	Best Latin Album	Nominated	
Amigo Awards	1998	Luis Miguel	Best Latin Male Artist	Nominated	
Amigo Awards	1999	Luis Miguel	Best Latin Male Artist	Nominated	
Amigo Awards	1999	Amarte Es un Placer	Best Latin Album	Won	
Amigo Awards	2003	Luis Miguel	Best Latin Male Artist	Nominated	
ASCAP Latin Awards	1993	"No Sé Tú"	Pop Song Of The Year	Won	
ASCAP Latin Awards	1994	"Ayer"	Award-Winning Songs — Pop/Contemporáneo	Won	
ASCAP Latin Awards	1995	"Tú y Yo"	Award-Winning Songs — Pop/Contemporáneo	Won	
ASCAP Latin Awards	1996	"La Media Vuelta"	Award-Winning Songs — Pop	Won	
ASCAP Latin Awards	1997	"Amanecí En Tus Brazos"	Award-Winning Songs — Pop/Rock	Won	
ASCAP Latin Awards	1997	"Dame"	Award-Winning Songs — Pop/Rock	Won	
ASCAP Latin Awards	1998	"Cómo Es Posible Que a Mi Lado"	Award-Winning Songs — Pop/Balada	Won	
ASCAP Latin Awards	1999	"Contigo (Estar Contigo)"	Award-Winning Songs — Pop/Balada	Won	
ASCAP Latin Awards	2000	"O Tú o Ninguna"	Award-Winning Songs — Pop/Balada	Won	
ASCAP Latin Awards	2001	"Amarte Es Un Placer"	Award-Winning Songs — Pop/Balada	Won	
Association of Latin Entertainment Critics (ACE, New York)	1988	Luis Miguel	Favorite Male Act	Nominated	
Association of Latin Entertainment Critics (ACE, New York)	1990	Luis Miguel	Outstanding Male Artist	Nominated	
Association of Latin Entertainment Critics (ACE, New York)	1991	Luis Miguel	Favorite Male Act	Won	
Association of Latin Entertainment Critics (ACE, New York)	1993	Romance	Album of the Year	Won	
Association of Latin Entertainment Critics (ACE, New York)	1994	Luis Miguel	Favorite Male Act	Nominated	
Association of Latin Entertainment Critics (ACE, New York)	1994	Luis Miguel	Best Concert	Nominated	
Association of Latin Entertainment Critics (ACE, New York)	1995	Segundo Romance	Album of the Year	Won	
Association of Latin Entertainment Critics (ACE, New York)	1995	Luis Miguel	Extraordinary Figure	Honoree	
Association of Latin Entertainment Critics (ACE, New York)	1996	El Concierto	Album of the Year	Nominated	
Association of Latin Entertainment Critics (ACE, New York)	1996	Luis Miguel	Extraordinary Figure of the Year	Won	
Association of Latin Entertainment Critics (ACE, New York)	1998	Luis Miguel	Favorite Male Act	Won	
Association of Latin Entertainment Critics (ACE, New York)	2001	Luis Miguel	Favorite Male Act	Nominated	
Billboard Number One Awards (Note: Prior to the inauguration of the Billboard Music Awards in 1990, the magazine had the "Number One Awards" to honor the top-performing artists of the year on each of chart categories.)	1988	"La Incondicional"	Top Hot Latin Tracks	Nominated	
Billboard Number One Awards	1989	En Busca de Una Mujer	Top Pop Latin Album	Nominated	
Billboard Number One Awards	1989	"La Incondicional"	Top Hot Latin Tracks	Nominated	
Billboard Number One Awards	1989	"Un Hombre Busca Una Mujer"	Top Hot Latin Tracks	Nominated	
Billboard Number One Awards	1989	"Fria Como el Viento"	Top Hot Latin Tracks	Nominated	
Billboard Music Awards	1992	Luis Miguel	Top Latin Artist	Won	
Billboard Music Awards	1992	Luis Miguel	Top Latin Album (Artist)	Won	
Billboard Music Awards	1992	Luis Miguel	Top Hot Latin Track Artist	Won	
Billboard Music Awards	1993	Luis Miguel	Best Latin Male Artist	Won	
Billboard Music Awards	1993	Luis Miguel	Top Latin Album (Artist)	Won	
Billboard Music Awards	2024	Luis Miguel	Top Latin Touring Artist	Won	
Billboard Music Video Awards	1993	"Ayer"	Latin Clip of the Year	Nominated	
Billboard Music Video Awards	2000	"Amarte Es Un Placer"	Latin Clip of the Year	Nominated	
Billboard Latin Music Awards	1994	Luis Miguel	Male Artist of the Year	Won	
Billboard Latin Music Awards	1994	Aries	Album of the Year	Won	
Billboard Latin Music Awards	1995	Segundo Romance	Album of the Year — Male Artist	Won	
Billboard Latin Music Awards	1998	Luis Miguel	Billboard Latin 50 Artist of the Year	Won	
Billboard Latin Music Awards	1998	Romances	Pop Album of the Year — Male Artist	Won	
Billboard Latin Music Awards	2000	Amarte Es un Placer	Pop Album of the Year — Male Artist	Won	
Billboard Latin Music Awards	2001	Vivo	Pop Album of the Year — Male Artist	Won	
Billboard Latin Music Awards	2002	Mis Romances	Pop Album of the Year — Male Artist	Won	
Billboard Latin Music Awards	2003	Luis Miguel	Latin Tour of the Year	Won	
Billboard Latin Music Awards	2004	Luis Miguel	Latin Tour of the Year	Won	
Billboard Latin Music Awards	2004	33	Pop Album of the Year — Male Artist	Nominated	
Billboard Latin Music Awards	2006	Luis Miguel	Latin Tour of the Year	Won	
Billboard Latin Music Awards	2007	Luis Miguel	Latin Tour of the Year	Nominated	
Billboard Latin Music Awards	2007	Navidades	Pop Album of the Year — Male Artist	Nominated	
Billboard Latin Music Awards	2009	Cómplices	Latin Pop Album Of The Year, Solo	Nominated	
Billboard Latin Music Awards	2009	Luis Miguel	Latin Tour of the Year	Nominated	
Billboard Latin Music Awards	2014	Luis Miguel	Latin Tour of the Year	Won	
Billboard Latin Music Awards	2019	Luis Miguel	Latin Tour of the Year	Won	
Billboard Latin Music Awards	2024	Luis Miguel	Latin Tour of the Year	Nominated	
Billboard Latin Music Awards	2025	Luis Miguel	Latin Tour of the Year	Nominated	
BMI Latin Awards	1994	"Ayer"	Award-Winning Songs	Won	
BMI Latin Awards	1994	"Inolvidable"	Award-Winning Songs	Won	
BMI Latin Awards	1995	"Hasta El Fin"	Award-Winning Songs	Won	
BMI Latin Awards	1995	"Hasta Que Me Olvides"	Award-Winning Songs	Won	
BMI Latin Awards	1995	"Suave"	Award-Winning Songs	Won	
BMI Latin Awards	1996	"El Día Que Me Quieras"	Award-Winning Songs	Won	
BMI Latin Awards	1996	"Todo Y Nada"	Award-Winning Songs	Won	
BMI Latin Awards	1998	"Cómo Es Posible Que a Mi Lado"	Award-Winning Songs	Won	
BMI Latin Awards	1998	"Dame"	Award-Winning Songs	Won	
BMI Latin Awards	1998	"Que Tú Te Vas"	Award-Winning Songs	Won	
BMI Latin Awards	1999	"El Reloj"	Award-Winning Songs	Won	
BMI Latin Awards	1999	"Por Debajo De La Mesa"	Award-Winning Songs	Won	
BMI Latin Awards	1999	"Sabor A Mí"	Award-Winning Songs	Won	
BMI Latin Awards	2001	"Sol, Arena y Mar"	Award-Winning Songs	Won	
BMI Latin Awards	2002	"Dormir Contigo"	Award-Winning Songs	Won	
BMI Latin Awards	2002	"La Bikina"	Award-Winning Songs	Won	
BMI Latin Awards	2002	"Y"	Award-Winning Songs	Won	
BMI Latin Awards	2003	"Amor, Amor, Amor"	Award-Winning Songs	Won	
BMI Latin Awards	2003	"Como Duele"	Award-Winning Songs	Won	
BMI Latin Awards	2003	"Si Nos Dejan"	Award-Winning Songs	Won	
BMI Latin Awards	2005	"Te Necesito"	Award-Winning Songs	Won	
BMI Latin Awards	2007	"Échame A Mí La Culpa"	Award-Winning Songs	Won	
Blockbuster Entertainment Awards	1998	Luis Miguel	Favorite Latino Artist	Nominated	
Bravo Awards	1990	Busca una Mujer	Album of the Year	Nominated	
Bravo Awards	1990	Luis Miguel	Young Singer of the Year	Nominated	
Bravo Awards	1990	"La Incondicional"	Song of the Year	Nominated	
Desi Entertainment Awards (Note: Established in 1989 in New York City.)	1995	Luis Miguel	Best Pop Singer	Won	
El Heraldo de México Awards	1987	Luis Miguel	Youth Idol (ídolo juvenil)	Won	
El Heraldo de México Awards	1989	"La Incondicional"	Best Video	Won	
El Heraldo de México Awards	1989	Luis Miguel	Best Singer	Won	
Festival Acapulco	1991	Luis Miguel	Special medal	Won	
Festival Acapulco	1993	Luis Miguel	Special medal	Won	
FMDOS Awards	2023	Luis Miguel	Concert of the Year	Nominated	
Galardón a los Grandes (Note: An award given by Raul Velasco in Siempre en Domingo.)	1988	Luis Miguel	15 Grandes Award	Won	
Galardón a los Grandes	1990	20 Años	For having selling one million copies	Won	
Galardón a los Grandes	1992	Luis Miguel	(1992 winners)	Won	
Grammy Awards	1985	"Me Gustas Tal Como Eres" (with Sheena Easton)	Best Mexican-American Performance	Won	
Grammy Awards	1988	Soy Como Quiero Ser	Best Latin Pop Performance	Nominated	
Grammy Awards	1991	20 Años	Best Latin Pop Performance	Nominated	
Grammy Awards	1993	Romance	Best Latin Pop Album	Nominated	
Grammy Awards	1994	Aries	Best Latin Pop Album	Won	
Grammy Awards	1995	Segundo Romance	Best Latin Pop Performance	Won	
Grammy Awards	1997	Nada Es Igual	Best Latin Pop Performance	Nominated	
Grammy Awards	1998	Romances	Best Latin Pop Performance	Won	
Grammy Awards	2000	Amarte Es Un Placer	Best Latin Pop Performance	Nominated	
Grammy Awards	2001	Vivo	Best Latin Pop Album	Nominated	
Grammy Awards	2004	33	Best Latin Pop Album	Nominated	
Grammy Awards	2006	Mexico en la Piel	Best Mexican/Mexican-American Album	Won	
Grammy Awards	2008	Navidades	Best Latin Pop Album	Nominated	
Grammy Awards	2009	Cómplices	Best Latin Pop Album	Nominated	
Grammy Awards	2019	¡México Por Siempre!	Best Música Mexicana Album (including Tejano)	Won	
Hollywood Walk of Fame	1996	Luis Miguel	Walk of Star	Won	
James L. Knight Center	1994	Luis Miguel	Plaque for selling out three shows at the venue	Honoree	
Juventud Awards	2004	Luis Miguel	He's Got Style	Nominated	
Juventud Awards	2004	Luis Miguel	He's So Hot!	Nominated	
Juventud Awards	2004	Luis Miguel	What A Actor!	Nominated	
Juventud Awards	2004	Luis Miguel	All Over The Dial	Nominated	
Juventud Awards	2004	Luis Miguel	My Idol Is	Nominated	
Juventud Awards	2004	Luis Miguel	Paparazzi's Favorite Target	Nominated	
Juventud Awards	2004	Luis Miguel & Myrka Dellanos	Paparazzi's Favorite Target	Won	
Juventud Awards	2004	Luis Miguel & Myrka Dellanos	Hottest Romance	Nominated	
Juventud Awards	2004	"Por Debajo de la Mesa"	Catchiest Tune	Nominated	
Juventud Awards	2004	33	I Die Without That CD	Nominated	
Juventud Awards	2004	Romances	I Die Without That CD	Nominated	
Juventud Awards	2005	Luis Miguel	Paparazzi's Favorite Target	Won	
Juventud Awards	2005	Luis Miguel & Aracely Arámbula	Hottest Romance	Nominated	
Juventud Awards	2006	Luis Miguel	Paparazzi's Favorite Target	Nominated	
Juventud Awards	2006	Luis Miguel & Aracely Arámbula	Hottest Romance	Nominated	
Juventud Awards	2007	Luis Miguel	Paparazzi's Favorite Target	Won	
Juventud Awards	2008	Luis Miguel	My Idol Is	Nominated	
Juventud Awards	2008	Luis Miguel & Aracely Arámbula	Hottest Romance	Nominated	
Juventud Awards	2009	Luis Miguel	Paparazzi's Favorite Target	Nominated	
Juventud Awards	2010	Luis Miguel	Paparazzi's Favorite Target	Won	
Juventud Awards	2011	"Tres Palabras"	Best Novelist Theme	Nominated	
Latin Grammy Awards	2000	Amarte Es un Placer	Album of the Year	Won	
Latin Grammy Awards	2000	Amarte Es un Placer	Best Pop Vocal	Won	
Latin Grammy Awards	2000	"Tu Mirada"	Best Male Pop Vocal	Won	
Latin Grammy Awards	2001	Vivo	Male Pop Vocal Album	Nominated	
Latin Grammy Awards	2003	"Hasta Que Vuelvas"	Record of the Year	Nominated	
Latin Grammy Awards	2004	33	Best Male Pop Vocal Album	Nominated	
Latin Grammy Awards	2005	México en la Piel	Best Ranchero Album	Won	
Latin Grammy Awards	2018	¡México Por Siempre!	Best Ranchero/Mariachi Album	Won	
Latin Grammy Awards	2018	¡México Por Siempre!	Album of the Year	Won	
Latin American Music Awards	2018	México Por Siempre Tour	Favorite Tour	Won	
Latin American Music Awards	2019	México Por Siempre Tour	Favorite Tour	Won	
Latin American Music Awards	2024	Luis Miguel Tour 2023–24	Favorite Tour	Nominated	
Laurel del Oro (Chile)	1992	Luis Miguel	Best International Artist	Won	
Laurel del Oro (Chile)	1992	Romance	Best Album of the Year	Won	
Laurel del Oro (Paraguay)	1992	Luis Miguel	Best Male Artist	Won	
Las Vegas International. Press Association	2013	Luis Miguel	Diamond Award	Honoree	
Las Vegas Walk of Stars	2006	Luis Miguel	Walk of Star	Won	
Lo Nuestro Awards	1990	Luis Miguel	Pop Male Artist of the Year	Nominated	
Lo Nuestro Awards	1990	"La Incondicional"	Pop Song of the Year	Won	
Lo Nuestro Awards	1991	Luis Miguel	Pop Male Artist of the Year	Won	
Lo Nuestro Awards	1991	20 Años	Pop Song of the Year	Nominated	
Lo Nuestro Awards	1991	"Tengo Todo Excepto a Ti"	Pop Album of the Year	Nominated	
Lo Nuestro Awards	1992	Luis Miguel	Pop Male Artist of the Year	Won	
Lo Nuestro Awards	1993	Luis Miguel	Pop Male Artist of the Year	Nominated	
Lo Nuestro Awards	1993	"No Sé Tú"	Pop Song of the Year	Won	
Lo Nuestro Awards	1993	Romance	Pop Album of the Year	Nominated	
Lo Nuestro Awards	1993	"América, América"	Video of the Year	Nominated	
Lo Nuestro Awards	1994	Luis Miguel	Pop Male Artist of the Year	Won	
Lo Nuestro Awards	1994	Aries	Pop Album of the Year	Won	
Lo Nuestro Awards	1994	"Hasta Que Me Olvides"	Pop Song of the Year	Nominated	
Lo Nuestro Awards	1994	"Ayer"	Pop Song of the Year	Nominated	
Lo Nuestro Awards	1994	"Ayer"	Video of the Year	Nominated	
Lo Nuestro Awards	1995	Luis Miguel	Pop Male Artist of the Year	Won	
Lo Nuestro Awards	1995	Segundo Romance	Pop Album of the Year	Won	
Lo Nuestro Awards	1995	"La Media Vuelta"	Video of the Year	Won	
Lo Nuestro Awards	1995	"El día que me quieras"	Pop Song of the Year	Nominated	
Lo Nuestro Awards	1996	Luis Miguel	Pop Male Artist of the Year	Won	
Lo Nuestro Awards	1996	El Concierto	Pop Album of the Year	Nominated	
Lo Nuestro Awards	1996	"Si Nos Dejan"	Pop Song of the Year	Nominated	
Lo Nuestro Awards	1997	Luis Miguel	Pop Male Artist of the Year	Nominated	
Lo Nuestro Awards	1997	Nada Es Igual	Pop Album of the Year	Nominated	
Lo Nuestro Awards	1997	"Dame"	Video of the Year	Nominated	
Lo Nuestro Awards	1998	Luis Miguel	Pop Male Artist of the Year	Nominated	
Lo Nuestro Awards	1998	"Por Debajo de la Mesa"	Pop Song of the Year	Nominated	
Lo Nuestro Awards	1998	Romances	Album of the Year	Nominated	
Lo Nuestro Awards	2000	Amarte Es un Placer	Pop Album of the Year	Nominated	
Lo Nuestro Awards	2001	Luis Miguel	Pop Male Artist of the Year	Nominated	
Lo Nuestro Awards	2001	Vivo	Pop Album of the Year	Nominated	
Lo Nuestro Awards	2001	"Amarte Es un Placer"	Pop Song of the Year	Nominated	
Lo Nuestro Awards	2003	Luis Miguel	Pop Male Artist of the Year	Nominated	
Lo Nuestro Awards	2003	Luis Miguel	Excellence Award	Honoree	
Lo Nuestro Awards	2006	Luis Miguel	Ranchero Artist of the Year	Nominated	
Lo Nuestro Awards	2006	Luis Miguel	Regional Mexican Male Artist	Nominated	
Lo Nuestro Awards	2006	"Que Seas Feliz"	Video of the Year	Nominated	
Lo Nuestro Awards	2019	México Por Siempre Tour	Tour of the Year	Nominated	
Lo Nuestro Awards	2020	Luis Miguel	Pop/Ballad Artist of the Year	Nominated	
Lo Nuestro Awards	2024	Luis Miguel Tour 2023	Tour of the Year	Nominated	
Lo Nuestro Awards	2025	Luis Miguel Tour 2023–24	Tour of the Year	Nominated	
Lunas del Auditorio	2002	Luis Miguel	Lifetime Award	Honoree	
Lunas del Auditorio	2002	Luis Miguel	Best Balada Act	Nominated	
Lunas del Auditorio	2002	Luis Miguel	Best Mexican Music Act	Nominated	
Lunas del Auditorio	2004	Luis Miguel	Best Spanish Pop Act	Nominated	
Lunas del Auditorio	2006	Luis Miguel	Best Spanish Pop Act	Won	
Madison Square Garden	1993	Luis Miguel	Plaque recognizing him as first Latin artist to achieve a sold-out concert at the venue	Honoree	
Meridiano de Oro	1995	Luis Miguel	Best Foreign Male Singer	Won	
MTV Latino	1998	Luis Miguel	Best Male Performance	Won	
MTV Video Music Awards	1993	Luis Miguel — "América, América"	MTV Internacional	Won	
Musa Awards (Chile)	2024	Luis Miguel 2024 Tour	Concert of the Year	Nominated	
National Auditorium (Mexico)	1995	Luis Miguel	Recognition: 16 concerts	Won	
National Auditorium (Mexico)	2000	Luis Miguel	Artist of the Year	Won	
National Auditorium (Mexico)	2000	Luis Miguel	Recognition: 21 concerts	Won	
National Auditorium (Mexico)	2004	Luis Miguel	Recognition: 121 concerts (1991–2004)	Won	
National Auditorium (Mexico)	2005	Luis Miguel	Recognition: 24 concerts (calendar year)	Won	
National Auditorium (Mexico)	2006	Luis Miguel	Estela de Plata (Silver Stele): 30 concerts (calendar year)	Won	
National Auditorium (Mexico)	2009	Luis Miguel	Dalia de Plata (Silver Dahlia): 180 concerts	Won	
National Auditorium (Mexico)	2011	Luis Miguel	Recognition: 200 concerts	Won	
Orgullosamente Latino Award	2004	"Te Necesito"	Latin Video of the Year	Nominated	
Orgullosamente Latino Award	2008	Luis Miguel	Lifetime Award	Nominated	
Orgullosamente Latino Award	2010	Luis Miguel	Lifetime Award	Nominated	
Paseo de las Estrellas (Chile)	1994	Luis Miguel	Viña Walk of the Stars	Won	
People en Español Awards	2010	Labios de Miel	Comeback of the Year	Nominated	
People en Español Awards	2012	Luis Miguel	Achievement Award	Honoree	
Pollstar Awards	2019	México Por Siempre Tour	Best Latin Tour	Nominated	
Pollstar Awards	2020	México Por Siempre Tour	Best Latin Tour	Nominated	
Pollstar Awards	2021	Luis Miguel	Latin Touring Artist of The Decade	Nominated	
Pollstar Awards	2025	Luis Miguel Tour 2023–24	Latin Tour of the Year	Nominated	
Premios Excelencia Europea (Spain)	1990	Luis Miguel	—N/a	Won	
Premios Eres (Mexico)	1991	20 Años	Best Album	Won	
Premios Eres (Mexico)	1991	"Entrégate"	Best Video	Won	
Premios Eres (Mexico)	1991	Luis Miguel	Best Male Singer	Won	
Premios Eres (Mexico)	1991	Luis Miguel	Best Male Show	Nominated	
Premios Eres (Mexico)	1992	Luis Miguel	Best Male Singer	Won	
Premios Eres (Mexico)	1992	Romance	Best Album	Nominated	
Premios Eres (Mexico)	1993	Luis Miguel	Best Male Singer	Won	
Premios Eres (Mexico)	1993	Luis Miguel	Best Male Show	Won	
Premios Eres (Mexico)	1993	Romance	Best Album	Won	
Premios Eres (Mexico)	1993	"No Sé Tú"	Best Video	Won	
Premios Eres (Mexico)	1994	Luis Miguel	Best Male Singer	Won	
Premios Eres (Mexico)	1994	Luis Miguel	Best Male Show	Won	
Premios Eres (Mexico)	1994	Aries	Best Album	Won	
Premios Eres (Mexico)	1994	"Ayer"	Best Video	Won	
Premios Eres (Mexico)	1994	"Hasta Que Me Olvides"	Best Song	Nominated	
Premios Eres (Mexico)	1995	Luis Miguel	Best Male Singer	Won	
Premios Eres (Mexico)	1995	Luis Miguel	Best Male Show	Won	
Premios Eres (Mexico)	1995	Segundo Romance	Best Album	Won	
Premios Eres (Mexico)	1995	"El Día Que Me Quieras"	Best Video	Nominated	
Premios Eres (Mexico)	1995	"La Media Vuelta"	Best Video	Won	
Premios Eres (Mexico)	1995	"La Media Vuelta"	Best Song	Won	
Premios Eres (Mexico)	1995	"Todo y Nada"	Best Song	Nominated	
Premios Eres (Mexico)	1996	El Concierto	Best Album	Won	
Premios Eres (Mexico)	1996	Luis Miguel	Best Male Singer	Won	
Premios Eres (Mexico)	1996	Luis Miguel	Best Male Show	Won	
Premios Eres (Mexico)	1996	Luis Miguel	Best Latin Artist	Nominated	
Premios Eres (Mexico)	1996	Si Nos Dejan	Best Song	Nominated	
Premios Eres (Mexico)	1997	Nada es Igual	Best Album	Won	
Premios Eres (Mexico)	1997	Luis Miguel	Best Male Singer	Won	
Premios Eres (Mexico)	1997	Luis Miguel	Best Male Show	Nominated	
Premios Eres (Mexico)	1997	"Dame"	Best Song	Nominated	
Premios Eres (Mexico)	1997	"Dame"	Best Video	Nominated	
Premios Eres (Mexico)	1998	Luis Miguel	Best Male Singer	Won	
Premios Eres (Mexico)	1998	Luis Miguel	Best Male Show	Won	
Premios Eres (Mexico)	1998	"Por Debajo de la Mesa"	Best Song	Nominated	
Premios Eres (Mexico)	1998	"Por Debajo de la Mesa"	Best Videoclip	Nominated	
Premios Eres (Mexico)	1998	Romances	Best Album	Nominated	
Premios Gardel	2000	Luis Miguel	Best Male Singer	Nominated	
Premios Gardel	2000	Amarte Es un Placer	Best Album	Nominated	
Premios Globo	1999	Luis Miguel	Male Artist of the Year - Pop/Ballad	Nominated	
Premios Globo	1999	Amarte Es un Placer	Best Album - Pop/Ballad	Nominated	
Premios INTE (Note: An award given by the Industria de la Televisión en Español (INTE) in Miami.)	2003	"Amor, Amor, Amor" in El Manantial	Telenovela Musical Theme of the Year	Won	
Premios Latino	2010	Luis Miguel	Artist of the Century	Honoree	
Premios Luces (Peru)	2025	Luis Miguel (Estadio Nacional)	Concert of the Year	Nominated	
Premios Mixup	2001	Luis Miguel	Spanish-language Male Artist	Won	
Premios Paoli	1988	Luis Miguel	International Male Singer	Won	
Premios Ondas	1997	Luis Miguel	Best Latino Artist	Won	
Premios Oye!	2002	Luis Miguel	Best Male Pop Artist — Spanish	Nominated	
Premios Oye!	2005	Luis Miguel	Best Ranchero Artist — Spanish	Won	
Premios Oye!	2008	Luis Miguel	Best Male Pop Artist — Spanish	Nominated	
Premios TVyNovelas	1983	Luis Miguel	Best Child Star	Won	
Premios TVyNovelas	1985	Luis Miguel	International Young Singer	Won	
Premios TVyNovelas	1986	Luis Miguel	Best Male TV-Singer	Won	
Premios TVyNovelas	1988	Luis Miguel	Best Male TV-Singer	Won	
Premios TVyNovelas	1990	Luis Miguel	Best Male TV-Singer	Won	
Premios TVyNovelas	1991	Luis Miguel	Most Outstanding Male Singer	Won	
Premios TVyNovelas	1993	Luis Miguel	Male Singer of the Year	Won	
Premios TVyNovelas	1993	Romance	Best Album of the Year	Won	
Premios TVyNovelas	1996	Luis Miguel	Best Male Singer	Won	
Premios TVyNovelas	2005	"Que seas feliz"	Best Musical Theme	Nominated	
Reforma	1999	Luis Miguel	Male Figure of the Century	Nominated	
Reforma	1999	Luis Miguel	Male Singer of the Century	Honoree	
Ritmo Latino Awards (Note: Also known as "Premio de la Gente" or Latin Music Fan Awards.)	2000	"Amarte Es Un Placer"	Video of the Year	Nominated	
Ritmo Latino Awards	2000	Luis Miguel	Artist of the Year	Nominated	
Ritmo Latino Awards	2000	Luis Miguel	Pop Male Artist of the Year	Nominated	
Ritmo Latino Awards	2000	Amarte Es un Placer	Album of the Year	Nominated	
Ritmo Latino Awards	2001	Luis Miguel	Male Pop Artist or Group	Nominated	
Ritmo Latino Awards	2002	Mis Romances	Album of the Year	Won	
Ronda Awards	1991	Romance	Best International Album	Won	
Ronda Awards	1991	Luis Miguel	Best International Artist	Won	
Ronda Awards	1992	Luis Miguel	Best International Artist	Won	
Ronda Awards	1993	Luis Miguel	International Artist of the Year	Won	
Ronda Awards	1993	Aries	Best Selling International Album	Won	
Ronda Awards	1994	Segundo Romance	Best Selling International Album	Nominated	
RTVE Disco del Año Gala (Spain)	2010	Labios de Miel	Album of the Year	Nominated	
Sanremo Music Festival	1985	"Noi, ragazzi di oggi"	Big Contest	Runner-up	
Showtime	2000	Luis Miguel	A special "crown"	Won	
South Korea Global Music Video Show Awards (Note: Awards given by KBS-TV.)	1992	Luis Miguel	Best Pop Vocalist	Won	
South Korea Global Music Video Show Awards	1993	Luis Miguel	Best Artist from a Non-English Speaking Country	Won	
Spotify Awards	2020	Luis Miguel	Most-Shared Artist	Nominated	
Spotify Awards	2020	Luis Miguel	Most-Streamed Mexican Artist	Nominated	
Spotify Awards	2020	Luis Miguel	Mexican Artist in Spotify of the Year	Nominated	
Spotify Awards	2020	Luis Miguel	Artist with more songs in the Top 200	Nominated	
Spotify Awards	2020	Luis Miguel	Most-Streamed Mexican Artist in Mexico	Won	
Spotify Awards	2020	Luis Miguel	Most-Streamed Pop Artist	Won	
Spotify Awards	2020	Luis Miguel	Most-Streamed Male Artist — by Users over 45 Years Old	Won	
Spotify Awards	2020	Luis Miguel	Most-Streamed Male Artist — by Users 30-45 Years Old	Won	
Spotify Awards	2020	Most-Streamed Song during Cry of Independence	"La Bikina"	Nominated	
Spotify Awards	2020	Most-Streamed Song during Cry of Independence	"México en la Piel"	Won	
Ticketmaster Awards (Spain)	2025	Top International Artist	Luis Miguel	Nominated	
Ticketmaster Awards (Spain)	2025	Most Spectacular Tour	Luis Miguel Tour 2023–24	Nominated	
Unión de Periodistas del Espectáculo de México	1989	Luis Miguel	Figure of the Month Award	Won	
Viña del Mar International Song Festival	1985	Luis Miguel	Antorcha de Plata (Silver Torch)	Won	
Viña del Mar International Song Festival	1986	Luis Miguel	Antorcha de Plata (Silver Torch)	Won	
Viña del Mar International Song Festival	1990	Luis Miguel	Antorcha de Plata (Silver Torch)	Won	
Viña del Mar International Song Festival	1990	Luis Miguel	Gaviota de Oro (Gold Gull)	Won	
Viña del Mar International Song Festival	1990	Luis Miguel	Gaviota de Plata (Silver Gull)	Won	
Viña del Mar International Song Festival	1994	Luis Miguel	Aplauso de Oro (for the most popular artist of the festival)	Won	
Viña del Mar International Song Festival	2012	Luis Miguel	Gaviota de Plata (Silver Gull)	Won	
Viña del Mar International Song Festival	2012	Luis Miguel	Gaviota de Oro (Gold Gull)	Won	
Viña del Mar International Song Festival	2012	Luis Miguel	Gaviota de Platino (Platinum Gull)	Won	
Vota la voce Festival	1985	Luis Miguel	Best Male Revelation	Won	
William Morris Agency	1998	Luis Miguel	Most Successful Latin Tour Ever	Won	
World Music Awards	1990	Luis Miguel	Best-Selling Latin Artist	Won	
World Music Awards	1995	Luis Miguel	Best-Selling Latin Artist	Won	
World Music Awards	1998	Luis Miguel	Best-Selling Latin Artist	Won	

== Other honors ==
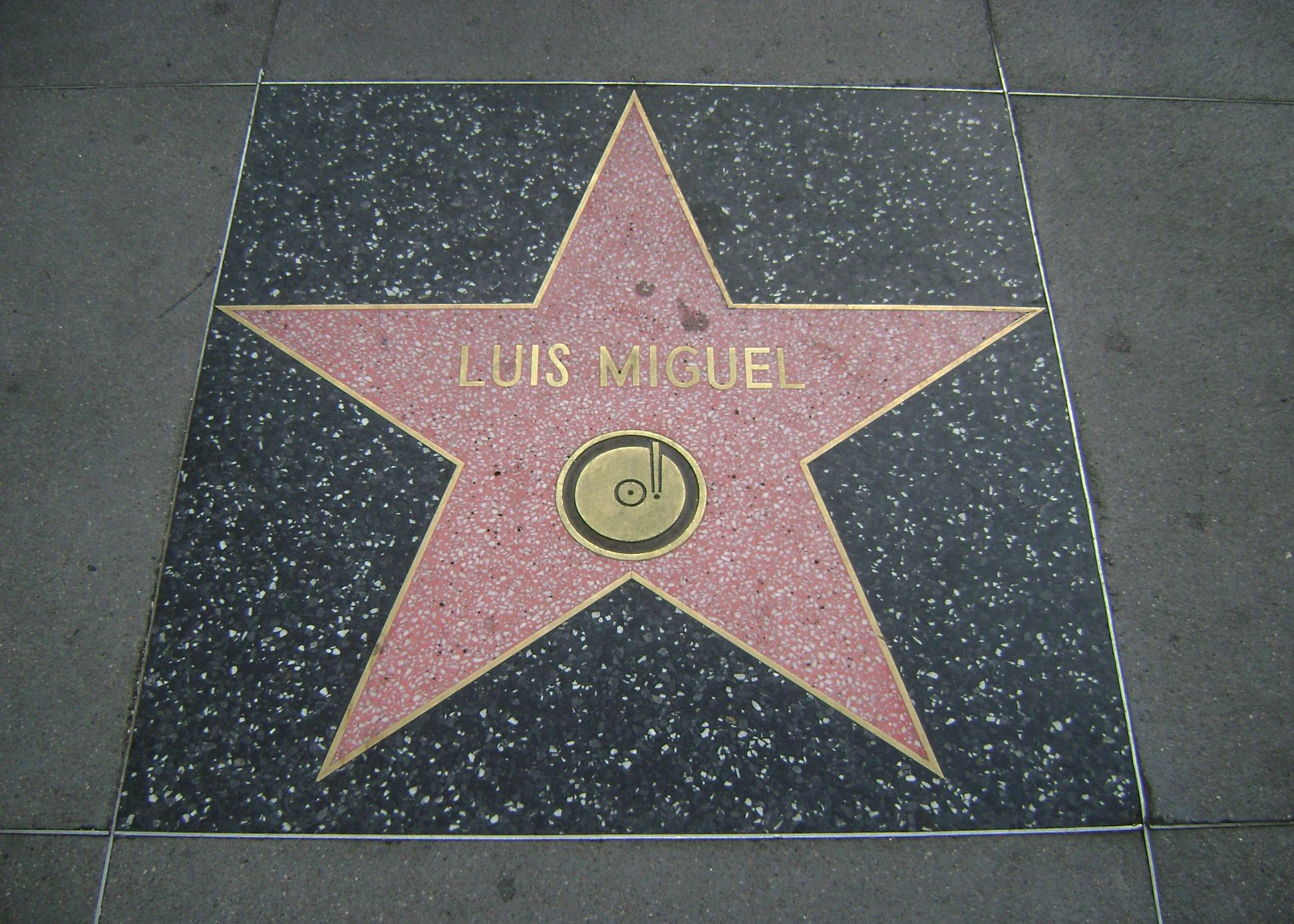
Miguel's Hollywood Walk of Fame

List of state honors
Country	City/Gov./Entity	Year	Description	Status	Ref.
United States	President of Mexico/Carlos Salinas de Gortari	1989	Antena de Cristal: Trayectoria (Crystal Antenna)	Honoree	
Bolivia	City of Oruro/Mayor of the City	1990	Silver Statuette / Honorary Guest	Honoree	
United States	City of Miami/Mayor Xavier Suarez	1993	Proclaimed "Luis Miguel Day" (June 19)	Honoree	
Panama	Panama City/Mayor Juan Carlos Navarro	2004	Key to City of Panama City	Honoree	
Paraguay	Junta Municipal de Asunción	2010	Illustrious Guest	Honoree	
Chile	Viña del Mar/Mayor Virginia Reginato	2012	Key to City of Viña del Mar	Honoree	
Chile	City of Antofagasta	2012	Illustrious Guest	Honoree	
United States	San Antonio City Council/Mayor Diego Bernal	2012	"Mayor For a Day"	Honoree	
Argentina	President Cristina Fernández de Kirchner	2012	Silver plaque	Honoree	
United States	Las Vegas City	2013	Proclaimed "Luis Miguel Day" (September 13)	Honoree	
Argentina	Buenos Aires City Legislature/Deputy Oscar Moscariello	2014	Guest of Honor	Honoree	
Paraguay	Junta Municipal de Asunción/Councilor Rossana Rolón	2014	Illustrious Guest	Honoree	
