= Ayer (Luis Miguel song) =

1993 song by Luis Miguel

Single by Luis Miguel

from the album Aries
- Released: 17 May 1993
- Recorded: June 1992 – May 1993
- Studio: Ocean Way (A & B); Record One (Los Angeles, CA)
- Length: 3:25
- Label: WEA Latina
- Composers: David Foster; Jeremy Lubbock
- Lyricist: Rudy Pérez
- Producers: Luis Miguel; Kiko Cibrian

Luis Miguel singles chronology
"América, América" (1992)	"Ayer" (1993)	"Hasta Que Me Olvides" (1993)

Music video
- "Ayer" on YouTube

"Ayer" (transl. "Yesterday") is a song by Mexican singer Luis Miguel from his ninth studio album, Aries (1993). Miguel and Kiko Cibrian handled the song's production. It was released as the album's lead single on 17 May 1993 by WEA Latina. It is a Spanish-language adaptation of David Foster's instrumental "All That My Heart Can Hold" with lyrics written by Rudy Pérez. A sentimental ballad, the song conveys the singer's pride and pain of his frustrated dreams. Three music videos for the song were filmed at the Longoria Mansion in Mexico City and were nominated for Video of the Year at the Premio Lo Nuestro 1994. The ballad received positive reactions from music critics who favorably compared it to the ballads of his previous studio album, Romance (1991).

"Ayer" was nominated in the category of Pop Song of the Year at the 1994 Lo Nuestro Awards and was a recipient of the American Society of Composers, Authors and Publishers (ASCAP) Latin Award in 1994 under the pop/ballad category. Commercially, it became Miguel's eighth number one song on the Billboard Hot Latin Songs chart in the United States and was the sixth best-performing Latin song of 1993 in the country. The song was covered by Mexican entertainer Diego Boneta for the soundtrack of Luis Miguel: The Series (2018).

== Background and composition ==
In 1991 Miguel released his eighth studio album Romance, a collection of classic boleros, the oldest of which originated in the 1940s. The album, which was produced by Armando Manzanero and arranged by Bebu Silvetti, was a commercial success in Latin America and sold over seven million copies worldwide. It revived interest in the bolero genre and was the first record by a Spanish-speaking artist to be certified gold in Brazil, Taiwan and the United States. In spite of the album's success, Miguel did not want to release a follow-up record that was similar to Romance. When asked why he chose not to record more boleros, he replied, "I wanted to try my music, just forgetting a little bit about those boleros that everyone knows." The singer began working with the composers for the album a year before recording in a studio in 1992; in Miguel's words, he wanted to "discuss the works, the themes, and melodies; ... The creation of an album has to be part of me or else I would not be able to interpret it, or sing in it."

On 24 August 1992, Mexican newspaper El Siglo de Torreón reported that Miguel had begun collaborating with David Foster and Juan Carlos Calderón on some compositions, along with English-speaking composers, and selecting cover versions for the album. Due to difficulty finding a suitable producer for the record, the singer decided to co-produce it with his long-time associate Kiko Cibrian. He also received assistance from Cuban composer Rudy Pérez who composed four of the tracks for Aries (1993), including "Ayer". "Ayer" is a Spanish-language adaptation of Foster and Jeremy Lubbock's instrumental "All That My Heart Can Hold" from the former's 1986 self-titled album. It is a sentimental ballad that "conveys pride and pain" of frustrating dreams.

== Promotion and reception ==
"Ayer" was released as the lead single from Aries by WEA Latina on 17 May 1993 throughout Latin America. Three music videos for the song were released and directed by Benny Corral, Rubén Galindo and Gustavo Garzón, respectively, and filmed at the Longoria Mansion in Mexico City. According to La Prensa de Antonio's Diana Raquel, the videos take one "through the delicate aspects of a rainy night, as well as the marked eroticism of a couple loving each other intensely". They were nominated in the category of Video of the Year at the 6th Annual Lo Nuestro Awards in 1994, which was presented to "Sabor, Sabor" by Rosario Flores. The visuals were also nominated Latin Clip of the Year at the 1993 Billboard Music Video Awards, but ultimately lost to "Sentir" by Jon Secada. The song was included on the set list for the Aries Tour (1993–94).

In her review of the album, the Chicago Tribune's Achy Obejas highlighted as one of the record's "luxuriantly slow narratives of love lost". Mario Tarradell of the Miami Herald called the song a "sweeping ballad" and noted it has the "longing love song feel, filled with crescendos and soft moment, and lush orchestrations". The San Antonio Express-News reviewer Ramiro Burr characterized the song as a "lush ballad sung by Miguel in his stylistic romantic swagger that simultaneously conveys pride and pain". Billboard reviewer Paul Verna called "Ayer" a "perfect transition track from Romance". Similarly, John Lannert wrote for the Sun-Sentinel that the track was comparable to Romance's "sparse lyrical muse and smooth musical backdrop". Diana Raquel of La Prensa de San Antonio praised its "incredible, wonderful and complete instrumentation, from keyboards to violins, cellos, percussion, and all the necessary personnel (without skimping) so that the tune sounds in style".

"Ayer" was nominated in the category of Pop Song of the Year at the 1994 Lo Nuestro Awards but ultimately lost to "Nunca Voy a Olvidarte" by Cristian Castro. It was recognized as one of the best-performing songs of the year at the ASCAP Latin Awards under the pop/ballad category in 1994 as well as the inaugural BMI Latin Awards in the same year. Commercially, "Ayer" became Miguel's eighth number one song on the Billboard Hot Latin Songs chart in the US. It was the sixth best-performing Latin song of 1993 in the country. In 2021, Mexican entertainer Diego Boneta covered "Ayer" on the soundtrack for the second season of Luis Miguel: The Series (2018).

== Personnel ==
Adapted from the Ayer liner notes:

Performance credits

- Randy Kerber – keyboards, arranger
- Harvey Mason – drums
- Kiko Cibrian – guitar
- Freddie Washington Jr. – bass
- The Hollywood String Ensemble – orchestra
- Ezra Kliger – concertmaster, violin
- Paul C. Shure – violin
- Shari Zippert – violin
- Roman Volodarsky – violin
- Barbara J. Porter – violin
- Vladimir Polimatidi – violin
- Cordon H. Marron – violin
- Charles H. Everett – violin
- Norman J. Hughes – violin
- Joel Derouin – violin
- Sid Page – violin
- Linda Rose – violin
- R.F. Peterson – violin
- John J. Wittenberg – violin
- Leslie J. Woodbury – violin
- Endre Granat – violin
- Alexander Horvath – violin
- Israel Baker – violin
- Herschel P. Wiserenita Koven – viola
- Raymond J. Tisher II – viola
- James J. Ross – viola
- John T. Acevedo – viola
- Cynthia Morrow – viola
- Larry Corbett – cello
- Daniel W. Smith – cello
- Nancy Stein – cello
- Roger Lebow – cello
- Steve G. Edelman – contrabass
- Jon C. Clarke – English horn, oboe
- Joseph Meyer – French horn
- Calvin Smith – French horn
- Michael A. Englander – percussion

Technical credits

- Luis Miguel – producer
- Kiko Cibrian – co-producer
- Rudy Pérez – co-producer in the voice recording
- Mauricio Abaroa – executive producer
- Julio Saenz – executive producer
- Benny Faccone – engineer, mixing
- Jim Champagne – assistant engineer, mixing assistant
- Noel Hazen – assistant engineer, mixing assistant
- Bernie Grundman – mastering
- Alfredo Gatica – artistic coordination
- Ezra Kliger – production coordination
- Jose Quintana – production coordination
- Carlos Somonte – photography
- Cartel Diseñadores – design

== Charts ==
=== Weekly charts ===
Chart performance for "Ayer"
Chart (1993)	Peak position
Mexico (Notitas Musicales)	1
US Hot Latin Songs (Billboard)	1

=== Year-end charts ===
1993 year-end chart performance for "Ayer"
Chart (1993)	Position
US Hot Latin Songs (Billboard)	6

== See also ==
- Billboard Hot Latin Songs Year-End Chart
- List of number-one Billboard Hot Latin Tracks of 1993
- List of number-one hits of 1993 (Mexico)
