= Aries Tour =

1993–94 concert tour by Luis Miguel

- Tour by Luis Miguel
- Associated album: Aries
- Start date: 6 May 1993
- End date: 24 July 1994
- Legs: 2
- No. of shows: TBD

Luis Miguel concert chronology
- Romance Tour (1991–92); Aries Tour (1993–94); Segundo Romance Tour (1994)

The Aries Tour was launched by Luis Miguel to some United States and Latin American countries to promote his album Aries. It began on 6 May 1993, in Guadalajara and ended on 24 July 1994, in Costa Rica.

During this tour he again broke all box office records: first Latin singer to achieve a sellout crowd at Madison Square Garden in New York City, ten consecutive shows at National Auditorium in Mexico City, two dates at the James L. Knight Center in Miami. He later also achieved four fully filled shows in the Universal Amphitheatre in Los Angeles and in Caesars Palace in Las Vegas, filling it completely for 7 nights; in Argentina, he achieved a full stadium in the Velez Sarsfield stadium with more than 50,000 people. He made more than 130 performances, most of them selling out.

== Set list ==
This set list is from the 19 November 1993, concert in Buenos Aires. It does not represent all dates throughout the tour.

1. "América, América"
2. "Dame Tú Amor"
3. "Entrégate"
4. "Oro De Ley"
5. "Alguien Como Tú" (Somebody In Your Life)
6. Medley:
  - "Yo Que No Vivo Sin Ti"
  - "Culpable O No"
  - "Mas Allá de Todo"
  - "Fría Como el Viento"
  - "La Incondicional"
7. "Suave"
8. "Tengo Todo Excepto a Ti"
9. "Hasta Que Me Olvides"
10. "Interlude" (Band)
11. "Que Nivel De Mujer" (Attitude Dance)
12. "Ayer"
13. "No Me Platiques Más"
14. "La Barca"
15. "No Sé Tú"
16. "Mucho Corazón"
17. "Inolvidable"
18. "Será Que No Me Amas"
  Encore
19. "Un Hombre Busca Una Mujer"
20. "Cuando Calienta El Sol"

== Tour dates ==
List of concerts, showing date, city, country and venue
Date	City	Country	Venue
North America
6 May 1993	Guadalajara	Mexico	Estadio Tres de Marzo
7 May 1993	Guadalajara	Mexico	Dinner Show
8 May 1993	Guadalajara	Mexico	—
9 May 1993	Querétaro	Mexico	Estadio Corregidora
10 May 1993	México City	Mexico	Centro De Espectaculos Premier
12 May 1993	Puebla	Mexico	Centro Libanés
14 May 1993	Hidalgo	Mexico	(Private show)
15 May 1993	Pachuca	Mexico	Estrellas
16 May 1993	Cuernavaca	Mexico	—
20 May 1993	San Juan	Puerto Rico	Hotel Hilton
23 May 1993	San Juan	Puerto Rico	Hiram Bithorn Stadium
28 May 1993	Acapulco	Mexico	Video Visa (Private show)
29 May 1993 (Note: The 29 May show in Acapulco was fully recorded for its transmission in Mexico by Televisa)	Acapulco	Mexico	Festival Acapulco
3 June 1993	México City	Mexico	Auditorio Nacional
4 June 1993	México City	Mexico	Auditorio Nacional
5 June 1993	México City	Mexico	Auditorio Nacional
6 June 1993	México City	Mexico	Auditorio Nacional
8 June 1993	México City	Mexico	Auditorio Nacional
9 June 1993	México City	Mexico	Auditorio Nacional
10 June 1993	México City	Mexico	Auditorio Nacional
11 June 1993	México City	Mexico	Auditorio Nacional
12 June 1993	México City	Mexico	Auditorio Nacional
13 June 1993	México City	Mexico	Auditorio Nacional
15 June 1993	San Diego	United States	San Diego Sports Arena
18 June 1993	Miami	United States	James L. Knight Center
19 June 1993	Miami	United States	James L. Knight Center
22 June 1993	Atlanta	United States	—
24 June 1993	Washington, D.C.	United States	—
25 June 1993	Atlantic City	United States	Circus Maximus Showroom
26 June 1993	Atlantic City	United States	Circus Maximus Showroom
27 June 1993	Atlantic City	United States	Circus Maximus Showroom
2 July 1993	Monterrey	Mexico	Cintermex
3 July 1993	Monterrey	Mexico	Plaza de Toros de Monterrey
4 July 1993	Saltillo	Mexico	Salón Candilejas
9 July 1993	Hermosillo	Mexico	Centro de Usos Múltiples (CUM)
10 July 1993	Chihuahua	Mexico	—
11 July 1993	Ciudad Juárez	Mexico	Estadio Olímpico Benito Juárez
16 July 1993	Tlalnepantla	Mexico	Arroyo Satelite (Dinner Show)
23 July 1993	Veracruz	Mexico	(Dinner show)
24 July 1993	Veracruz	Mexico	—
25 July 1993	Mexicali	Mexico	Plaza de Toros Calafia
July ?, 1993	Ciudad Valles	Mexico	—
30 July 1993	San Luis Potosí	Mexico	—
31 July 1993	Tampico	Mexico	Discothèque Biblos
1 August 1993	Tampico	Mexico	Estadio Tamaulipas
4 August 1993	Cancún	Mexico	—
6 August 1993	Mérida	Mexico	Parque Kukulcán Alamo
7 August 1993	Villahermosa	Mexico	—
8 August 1993	Campeche	Mexico	Estadio Venustiano Carranza
August ?, 1993	Tuxtla Gutiérrez	Mexico	—
11 August 1993	Tapachula	Mexico	(Inauguration of a hotel)
13 August 1993	Poza Rica	Mexico	Estadio Jara Corona
14 August 1993	Tulancingo	Mexico	—
15 August 1993	Puebla	Mexico	Estadio de Béisbol Hermanos Serdán
18 August 1993	Cuernavaca	Mexico	—
20 August 1993	León	Mexico	—
22 August 1993	Zamora	Mexico	—
29 August 1993	Tehuacán	Mexico	—
1 September 1993	McAllen	United States	—
2 September 1993	Laredo	United States	Civic Center
3 September 1993	El Paso	United States	Special Events Center
4 September 1993	Houston	United States	Sam Houston Coliseum
5 September 1993	San Antonio	United States	Municipal Auditorium
September ?, 1993	Boston	United States	—
11 September 1993	New York	United States	Madison Square Garden
12 September 1993	Chicago	United States	UIC Pavilion
15 September 1993	Las Vegas	United States	Circus Maximus Showroom
16 September 1993	Las Vegas	United States	Circus Maximus Showroom
17 September 1993	Las Vegas	United States	Circus Maximus Showroom
18 September 1993	Las Vegas	United States	Circus Maximus Showroom
19 September 1993	Las Vegas	United States	Circus Maximus Showroom
23 September 1993	Los Angeles	United States	Universal Amphitheatre
24 September 1993	Los Angeles	United States	Universal Amphitheatre
25 September 1993	Los Angeles	United States	Universal Amphitheatre
26 September 1993	Los Angeles	United States	Universal Amphitheatre
October ?, 1993	Phoenix	United States	—
2 October 1993	San Francisco	United States	Bill Graham Civic Auditorium
October ?, 1993	San Jose	United States	San Jose Arena
8 October 1993	Córdoba	Mexico	—
9 October 1993	Veracruz	Mexico	—
12 October 1993	México City	Mexico	Universidad del Valle de México
October ?, 1993	México City	Mexico	Reino Aventura
15 October 1993	Guadalajara	Mexico	Hyatt Hotel
16 October 1993	Guadalajara	Mexico	Hyatt Hotel
17 October 1993	Aguascalientes	Mexico	—
19 October 1993	Minatitlán	Mexico	—
October ?, 1993	Zacatecas	Mexico	—
October ?, 1993	Acapulco	Mexico	—
October ?, 1993	Toluca	Mexico	Estadio La Bombonera
30 October 1993	Cuernavaca	Mexico	—
31 October 1993	México City	Mexico	Auditorio Nacional
South America
6 November 1993	Lima	Peru	Muelle Uno
7 November 1993	Lima	Peru	Estadio Alianza Lima
9 November 1993	Quito	Ecuador	Coliseo General Rumiñahui
11 November 1993	Guayaquil	Ecuador	Estadio George Capwell
18 November 1993	Buenos Aires	Argentina	Hotel Sheraton
19 November 1993 (Note: The 19 November show in Buenos Aires was fully recorded for its transmission in Argentina by Channel 13)	Buenos Aires	Argentina	Estadio Velez Sarsfield
23 November 1993	Montevideo	Uruguay	Estadio Centenario
26 November 1993	Asunción	Paraguay	Estadio Defensores del Chaco
North America
15 December 1993 (Note: Private show)	México City	Mexico	Auditorio Nacional
17 December 1993	Las Vegas	United States	Circus Maximus Showroom
18 December 1993	Las Vegas	United States	Circus Maximus Showroom
12 February 1994	Acapulco	Mexico	Inauguration of the Palladium discotheque
South America
21 February 1994 (Note: The 21 February show in Viña del Mar International Song Festival was fully recorded for its transmission in all America by several channels)	Viña del Mar	Chile	Quinta Vergara Amphitheater
North America
13 March 1994	Mexico City	Mexico	Auditorio Nacional
14 March 1994 (Note: Private show, organized by "Colegio Mercedes")	Mexico City	Mexico	Auditorio Nacional
17 March 1994	Guadalajara	Mexico	Estadio Tres de Marzo
18 March 1994 (Note: Dinner Show)	Guadalajara	Mexico	Salón Fiesta Guadalajara
20 March 1994	Tepic	Mexico	Estadio Nicolás Álvarez Ortega
2 April 1994	Ciudad Valles	Mexico	Fenahuap
Central America
15 April 1994	Guatemala City	Guatemala	Estadio del Ejército
North America
19 April 1994	Mexico City	Mexico	Centro de Espectáculos Premier
21 April 1994	Santo Domingo	Dominican Republic	Hotel Jaragua
23 April 1994	Santo Domingo	Dominican Republic	Estadio Olímpico
South America
10 May 1994	Maracaibo	Venezuela	Estadio Luis Aparicio El Grande
11 May 1994	Maracay	Venezuela	Plaza de toros Maestranza César Girón
13 May 1994	Valencia	Venezuela	Plaza de toros Monumental de Valencia
14 May 1994	Caracas	Venezuela	Estadio La Rinconada
7 June 1994	Bogotá	Colombia	Centro de Convenciones
10 June 1994	Bogotá	Colombia	Coliseo Cubierto el Campín
North America
27 June 1994	Washington, D.C.	United States	Constitution Hall
30 June 1994	Torreón	Mexico	Centro De Convenciones
2 July 1994	Gómez Palacio	Mexico	Estadio Rosa Laguna
Central America
21 July 1994	San Salvador	El Salvador	Gimnasio Nacional José Adolfo Pineda
24 July 1994	Alajuela	Costa Rica	Estadio Alejandro Morera Soto

- Note: Some dates and venues are missing, and others may be wrong, due to the lack of reliable sources.

=== Box office score data ===
Venue	City	Tickets sold / available	Gross revenue
Auditorio Nacional (3-6 Jun)	Mexico City	39,229 / 39,229	$1,424,515
Auditorio Nacional (8-13 Jun)	Mexico City	58,856 / 58,856	$2,265,205
Auditorio Nacional (31 Oct)	Mexico City	9,844 / 9,902	$448,141
Auditorio Nacional (14 Mar)	Mexico City	5,000 / 5,000	$214,586
San Diego Sports Arena	San Diego	10,687 / 10,687	$332,000
	Total	118,616 / 118,674 (~100%)	$4,469,861

== Cancelled shows ==
List of cancelled concerts, showing date, city, country, venue, and reason for cancellation
Date	City	Country	Venue	Reason
23 July 1993	Tijuana	Mexico	Plaza Monumental	Security issues

== Band ==
- Vocals: Luis Miguel
- Acoustic & electric guitar: Kiko Cibrian
- Bass: Lalo Carrillo
- Piano: Francisco Loyo
- Keyboards: Arturo Pérez
- Drums: Victor Loyo
- Saxophone: Jeff Nathanson
- Trumpet: Armando Cedillo
- Trumpet: Juan Arpero
- Trombone: Alejandro Carballo
- Backing vocals: Ana Espina Salinas, Fedra Vargas, Patricia Tanus
