= Aries (album) =

Studio album by Luis Miguel
- Released: 22 June 1993
- Recorded: June 1992 – May 1993
- Studios: Ocean Way (Hollywood); Record One (Los Angeles); Larrabee (Hollywood); Ground Control (Los Angeles)
- Genres: Dance-pop; R&B
- Length: 44:31
- Language: Spanish
- Label: WEA Latina
- Producers: Luis Miguel; Kiko Cibrian; David Foster; Emilio Castillo

Luis Miguel chronology
América & en Vivo (1992)	Aries (1993)	Segundo Romance (1994)

Singles from Aries
- 1. "Ayer" Released: 17 May 1993; 2. "Hasta Que Me Olvides" Released: August 1993; 3. "Suave" Released: 1993

Aries is the ninth studio album by Mexican recording artist Luis Miguel. It was released by WEA Latina on 22 June 1993. After attaining commercial success in 1991 with his previous album, Romance, Luis Miguel decided to return to a style similar to his earlier work, featuring pop ballads and dance numbers with R&B influences. The record was produced by Miguel, who was assisted by Kiko Cibrian, Rudy Pérez, David Foster, and Juan Luis Guerra.

Three singles were released to promote the album. The first two singles, "Ayer" and "Hasta Que Me Olvides," topped the US Billboard Hot Latin Songs chart and the third, "Suave," peaked at number nine. Two other songs were released as promotional singles, "Hasta el Fin" and "Tú y Yo"; both peaked at number four on the Hot Latin Songs chart. To further promote the record, Luis Miguel launched the 1993 Aries Tour to some Latin American countries and the United States.

Aries peaked at number one on the US Billboard Latin Pop Albums, where it stayed for 19 weeks. Internationally, the album was certified quadruple platinum in Mexico, where it sold over one million copies. It was also certified diamond in Argentina. Aries sold over three million copies worldwide. Upon its release, the album received mixed reviews from music critics; they were divided on the dance tunes and ballads, although Luis Miguel's vocals and the album's arrangements garnered positive reactions. Luis Miguel received several accolades, including Best Latin Pop Album at the 36th Grammy Awards, Luis Miguel's second win.

== Background and recording ==
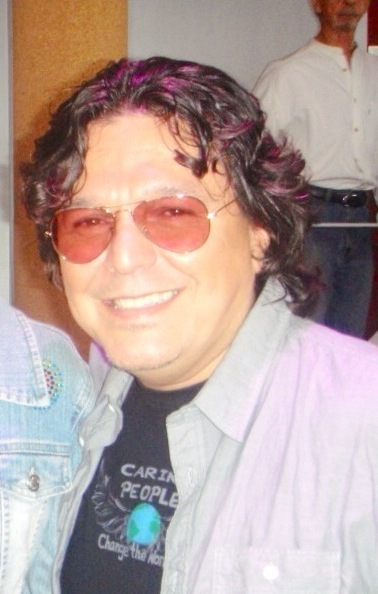
Rudy Pérez wrote four of the album's tracks including "Me Niego a Estar Solo", "Luz Verde", "Ayer", and "Tú y Yo".

In 1991 Miguel released his eighth studio album, Romance, a collection of classic boleros, the oldest of which originated in the 1940s. The album, which was produced by Armando Manzanero and arranged by Bebu Silvetti, was a commercial success in Latin America and sold over seven million copies worldwide. It revived interest in the bolero genre and was the first record by a Spanish-speaking artist to be certified gold in Brazil, Taiwan, and the United States. In spite of the album's success, Miguel did not want to release a follow-up record that was similar to Romance. When asked why he chose not to record more boleros, he replied "I wanted to try my music, just forgetting a little bit about those boleros that everyone knows". He began working with the composers for the album a year before recording in a studio in 1992; in Miguel's words, he wanted to "discuss the works, the themes, and melodies; ... The creation of an album has to be part of me or else I would not be able to interpret it, or sing in it".

On 24 August 1992, Mexican newspaper El Siglo de Torreón reported that Miguel had begun collaborating with David Foster and Juan Carlos Calderón on some compositions, along with English-speaking composers, and selecting cover versions for the album. He also received assistance from Cuban composer Rudy Pérez and Dominican singer-songwriter Juan Luis Guerra with the songwriting. Recording began on 4 July 1992. Miguel had difficulty finding a suitable producer for the record; he initially worked with American audio engineer Bruce Swedien, but decided to re-record the whole album after disagreements with Swedien's direction. Unable to find a producer, he decided to co-produce the album with his long-time associate Kiko Cibrian. Recording the album took almost a year and was affected by several complications, including its high budget of over US$1.5 million, his father's death, and an appendectomy. Miguel announced that the name of the album would be Aries during a presentation at the 1993 Festival Acapulco. About the naming of the album he said, "This album expresses my personal self. I had a lot to do. I produced everything and wanted to have a lot of fun, take what I like, and what better than the zodiac sign representing what one is."

== Composition ==
Luis Miguel "Que Nivel de Mujer"
A 27-second sample of Miguel's "Que Nivel de Mujer", a Spanish adaptation of "Attitude Dance" by Tower of Power. One of the band's member Emilio Castillo arranged the horn sections in the song. About the inclusion of the song, Miguel commented that he was very fond of "that type of R&B, Motown, and hip-hop" and that "My musical influence comes from those sounds".

Aries is composed of ten tracks, six of which are romantic ballads. The remaining four songs are dance numbers which San Antonio Express-News editor Ramiro Burr describes as containing a "pop groove" and R&B influences, further comparing them to Miguel's earlier recordings before Romance. Miguel said the mixture of ballads and uptempo music was done to "keep a steady musical line" because he did not want his music to be unrecognizable. The dance tunes "Suave", "Dame Tu Amor", and "Que Nivel de Mujer" are "upbeat, brass-heavy, attitudinal numbers" while "Luz Verde" incorporates Latin hip hop and R&B. "Suave" features a saxophone solo by American musician Kirk Whalum and "Que Nivel de Mujer" is a Spanish-language adaptation of "Attitude Dance" by American band Tower of Power. The band members assisted with the horn section in the song, which was led by one of its lead members Emilio Castillo. Miguel said he included the band's song on the album because of his fondness for R&B in the 1970s, citing the group as one of his musical influences.

"Ayer" is a Spanish-language cover of David Foster's instrumental "All That My Heart Can Hold" with additional lyrics by Rudy Pérez. Burr characterized the song as a "lush ballad sung by Miguel in his stylistic romantic swagger that simultaneously conveys pride and pain". Similarly, John Lannert wrote for the Sun-Sentinel that the track was comparable to Romance's "sparse lyrical muse and smooth musical backdrop". Lannert also called Juan Luis Guerra's composition "Hasta Que Me Olvides" an "emotion-drenched love ode" and referred to "Me Niego Estar Solo" and "Hasta El Fin" as "desperate confessionals about being out of love". Achy Obejas of the Chicago Tribune labeled the ballads "Hasta El Fin" and "Tú y Yo" as "luxuriantly slow narratives of love lost".

== Singles and promotion ==
"Ayer"
A 20-second sample of Miguel's "Ayer", the album's lead single. The song is a cover of David Foster's instrumental "All That My Heart Can Hold" with lyrics added by Rudy Pérez. Ramiro Burr writes for the San Antonio Express-News: "It is a lush ballad sung in Miguel's stylistic swagger that simultaneously conveys pride and pain".

"Ayer" was released as the lead single from Aries on 17 May 1993. It reached number one on the Billboard Hot Latin Songs chart in the United States the week of 17 July 1993, and stayed there for three weeks. The three music videos for "Ayer" were directed by Benny Corral, Rubén Galindo, and Gustavo Garzón respectively. The music videos were filmed in a mansion in Mexico City. "Ayer" ended 1993 as the sixth-best-performing Latin song of the year in the US. It also topped the ballads chart in Mexico. The album's second single, "Hasta Que Me Olvides", was released in August 1993 and reached number one on the Hot Latin Songs chart the week of October 23, and remained there for three weeks. In Mexico, the track reached number two on the ballads chart. The album's third single, "Suave", was released in 1993 and peaked at number nine on the Hot Latin Songs chart and number on the Mexican ballads chart. Its music video was directed by Kiko Guerrero and features Miguel dancing with several women on a beach. "Hasta el Fin" and "Tú y Yo" were released as promotional singles in the US and both peaked at number four on the Hot Latin Songs chart. "Pensar en Ti" received airplay in Mexico and reached number one on its ballads chart, while "Me Niego a Estar Solo" was released as a promotional single in Spain in 1993.

To promote the album, Miguel began his Aries Tour on 29 May at the 1993 Acapulco Festival in Mexico. After his performances in Mexico, he toured several countries in Latin America beginning with Argentina, and later performed in the US. His set list consisted mainly of pop songs and ballads from Aries and his earlier career, as well as boleros from Romance, which he performed during the second half of the concerts.

== Critical reception ==
Professional ratings
Review scores
Source	Rating
AllMusic	2.5/5 stars
Chicago Tribune	2.5/4 stars
Los Angeles Times	3/4 stars

AllMusic editor Jose F. Promis gave the album two-and-a-half stars out of five and found the ballads to be "sometimes a little too syrupy". He complimented some of the dance tunes such as "Suave" and "Dame Tu Amor", but said "Luz Verde" was a "somewhat dated attempt at early-'90s Latin hip-hop R&B". A music journalist for Billboard magazine wrote a favorable review of Aries, stating that Miguel "trades in nostalgic boleros for a stylish, up-to-date package" and called "Ayer" a "perfect transition track from Romance". Chicago Tribune music critic Achy Obejas gave the record two-and-a-half stars out of four, calling it "a kind of middle ground between Romance and its lush ballads, and the bouncy pop of 20 Años, its immediate antecedent". She praised Miguel's vocals as "wonderfully nuanced and dramatic", and said the ballads mostly "work", but that "the uptempo tunes fall flat most of the time". Enrique Lopetegui of the Los Angeles Times gave the album three stars out of four; he lauded Miguel's inclusion of "healthy elements of jazz and funk into his polished sound" and said he "returns to familiar territory accompanied by his usual superb arrangements and musicianship".

=== Accolades ===
At the 36th Annual Grammy Awards in 1994, Miguel won the Grammy Award for Best Latin Pop Album for Aries. At the 6th Lo Nuestro Awards in the same year, the album won the award for Pop Album of the Year and Miguel was named Pop Male Artist of the Year. He also received two nominations in the category of Pop Song of the Year for "Hasta Que Me Olvides" and "Ayer"; the latter track was also nominated Video of the Year. At the inaugural Billboard Latin Music Awards in 1994, Miguel received two awards including Pop Album of the Year and Pop Male Artist of the Year. Miguel was awarded Best Male Singer, Best Male Show for the tour, and Best Disc for the album at the 1994 Eres awards.

== Commercial performance ==
Aries was released internationally on 22 June 1993, although pirated cassettes of the album were being sold for $1 in Mexico ten days before the official release. WEA Latina prepared 500,000 copies to be distributed on the release date, but after finding legitimate copies of the compact disc were already being sold on the pirate market, they discovered only 300,000 units stored in their warehouse. WEA Latina responded to the piracy by having a Mexican radio station play the whole album a few days before its release. In Mexico, the album was certified quadruple platinum; it has sold over one million copies in the country. In the US, it debuted and peaked at number two on the Billboard Top Latin Albums chart, second to Gloria Estefan's album Mi Tierra. Aries remained in this position until it was replaced by the Gipsy Kings's album Love and Liberté 20 weeks later.

Aries peaked at number one on the Billboard Latin Pop Albums chart and stayed at the top for 19 weeks. It ended 1993 as the second best-selling Latin pop album in the US after Romance. In Argentina, the album peaked at number two on the album chart and was certified diamond by the Argentine Chamber of Phonograms and Videograms Producers for sales of 500,000 copies. Elsewhere in South America, the album peaked at number one on the Chilean albums chart and was certified platinum in Colombia. Aries sold over three million copies worldwide.

== Track listing ==
All recordings produced by Luis Miguel and Kiko Cibrian, except where noted.

No.	Title	Lyrics	Music	Producer(s)	Length
1.	"Suave"	Orlando Castro; Kiko Cibrian	Cibrian		4:47
2.	"Me Niego a Estar Solo"	Rudy Pérez	Pérez		4:17
3.	"Luz Verde"	Pérez; Carlos Castellón - Jorge L. Piloto (Spanish adaptation)	Pérez		4:59
4.	"Hasta el Fin"	Cibrian	Cibrian		4:49
5.	"Ayer"	Pérez	David Foster; Jeremy Lubbock	Miguel; Cibrian; Foster	3:25
6.	"Que Nivel de Mujer"	Castro	Emilio Castillo; Stephen Kupka	Miguel; Cibrian; Castillo	4:28
7.	"Pensar en Ti"	Francisco F. Céspedes	Céspedes		4:15
8.	"Dame Tu Amor"	Adrián Posse; Cibrian	Cibrian		3:23
9.	"Hasta Que Me Olvides"	Juan Luis Guerra	Guerra		4:40
10.	"Tú y Yo"	Pérez	Jorge Calandrelli		4:50

== Personnel ==
Adapted from the Aries liner notes:

=== Musicians ===
- Robbie Buchanan – keyboards (tracks 1–2, 4, 7–8, 10), arranger (1–2, 4, 7)
- Marcel East – keyboards, arranger and programming (track 3)
- Randy Kerber – keyboards, arranger (tracks 5, 9)
- Nick Milo – keyboards (track 6)
- Jorge Calandrelli – electric piano, arranger (track 10)
- John Robinson – drums (tracks 1, 9–10)
- Harvey Mason – drums (tracks 2–5, 7)
- Francis Russ McKinnon – drums (track 6)
- Kiko Cibrian – guitar (tracks 1, 3, 5, 8), background vocals (1–2, 6), arranger (1, 4, 8), programing (8), brass arrangements (1, 8)
- Michael Landau – guitar (tracks 2, 4, 7, 10)
- Carmen Grillo – guitar (track 6)
- Paul Jackson, Jr. – guitar (tracks 7, 9)
- Dean Parks – Acoustic guitar (track 9)
- Paulinho da Costa – percussion (tracks 1, 4, 8–10)
- Neil Stubenhaus – bass (tracks 2, 7, 9–10)
- Freddie Washington – bass (tracks 3, 5)
- Rocco Prestia – bass (track 6)
- Jerry Hey – brass, brass arrangements (tracks 1, 3, 8)
- Dan Higgins – brass (tracks 1, 3, 8)
- Gary Grant – brass (tracks 1, 3, 8)
- Bill Reichenbach Jr. – brass (tracks 1, 3, 8)
- Kirk Whalum – saxophone solo (track 1)
- Emilio Castillo – tenor saxophone (track 6), background vocals (track 6)
- Brandon Fields – tenor saxophone (track 6)
- Stephen "Doc" Kupka – baritone saxophone (track 6)
- Greg Adams – trumpet, arranger (track 6)
- Lee Thornburg – trombone, trumpet (track 6)
- Tower of Power – guest artist (track 6)
- Annie Cruz – background vocals (tracks 1–2, 8)
- Iliana Holland – background vocals (tracks 1–2)
- Dan Navarro – background vocals (tracks 1–2, 6)
- Tom Bowes – background vocals (tracks 1–2, 6)

The Hollywood String Ensemble (tracks 3, 5, 7–10)

- Ezra Kliger – concertmaster, violin
- Paul C. Shure – violin
- Shari Zippert – violin
- Roman Volodarsky – violin
- Barbara J. Porter – violin
- Vladimir Polimatidi – violin
- Cordon H. Marron – violin
- Charles H. Everett – violin
- Norman J. Hughes – violin
- Joel Derouin – violin
- Sid Page – violin
- Linda Rose – violin
- R.F. Peterson – violin
- John J. Wittenberg – violin
- Leslie J. Woodbury – violin
- Endre Granat – violin
- Alexander Horvath – violin
- Israel Baker – violin
- Herschel P. Wiserenita Koven – viola
- Raymond J. Tisher II – viola
- James J. Ross – viola
- John T. Acevedo – viola
- Cynthia Morrow – viola
- Larry Corbett – cello
- Daniel W. Smith – cello
- Nancy Stein – cello
- Roger Lebow – cello
- Steve G. Edelman – contrabass
- Jon C. Clarke – English horn, oboe
- Joseph Meyer – French horn
- Calvin Smith – French horn
- Michael A. Englander – percussion

=== Production ===
- Luis Miguel – producer
- Kiko Cibrian – co-producer
- Mauricio Abaroa – executive producer
- Julio Saenz – executive producer
- Benny Faccone – engineer, mixing (tracks 2–3, 5–6, 8–9)
- Humberto Gatica – mixing (tracks 1, 4, 7)
- Paul McKenna – mixing (track 10)
- Rudy Pérez – co-producer in the voice recording
- Emilio Castillo – co-producer in "Que Nivel de Mujer"
- Jose Quintana – production coordination
- Ezra Kliger – production coordination
- Jim Champagne – assistant engineer, mixing assistant
- Noel Hazen – assistant engineer, mixing assistant
- Bryan Pollack – assistant engineer, mixing assistant
- Kimm James – assistant engineer, mixing assistant
- Bernie Grundman – mastering
- Cartel Diseñadores – design
- Alfredo Gatica – artistic coordination
- Carlos Somonte – photography
- Bruce Swedien – special thanks for their collaboration in this production

== Charts ==
=== Weekly charts ===
Weekly chart performance for Aries
Chart (1993–94)	Peak position
Argentine Albums (CAPIF)	2
US Billboard 200	182
US Top Latin Albums (Billboard)	2
US Latin Pop Albums (Billboard)	1

Chart (2003)	Peak position
Spanish Albums (PROMUSICAE)	91

=== Monthly charts ===
Monthly chart performance for Aries
Chart (1994)	Peak position
Chilean Albums (IFPI)	1

=== Year-end charts ===
Year-end chart performance for Aries
Chart (1993)	Peak position
US Latin Pop Albums (Billboard)	2

Chart (1994)	Peak position
US Top Latin Albums (Billboard)	14
US Latin Pop Albums (Billboard)	9

=== All-time charts ===
All-time chart performance for Aries
Chart (1985–1994)	Position
US Latin Pop Albums (Billboard)	9

== Certifications and sales ==
Region	Certification	Certified units/sales
Argentina (CAPIF)	Diamond	693,162
Colombia (ASINCOL)	Platinum	60,000
Chile	—	200,000
Mexico (AMPROFON)	4× Platinum	1,000,000
Spain (Promusicae)	Platinum	100,000^{^}
Uruguay (CUD)	3× Platinum	18,000^{^}
Summaries
Worldwide	—	3,000,000
^{^} Shipments figures based on certification alone.

== See also ==
- 1993 in Latin music
- List of diamond-certified albums in Argentina
- List of number-one Billboard Latin Pop Albums from the 1990s
- List of best-selling albums in Argentina
- List of best-selling albums in Chile
- List of best-selling albums in Mexico
- List of best-selling Latin albums
- List of most expensive albums
