= Noelia (album) =

Studio album by Noelia
- Released: February 16, 1999
- Genre: Pop; Latin
- Length: 43:52
- Label: Fonovisa

Noelia chronology
Noelia (1999)	Golpeando fuerte (2000)

Professional ratings
Review scores
Source	Rating
AllMusic	link

Noelia is the debut studio album by Puerto Rican singer Noelia. The album was released in 1999 and peaked at No. 7 on Billboard's Top Latin Albums chart.

The album produced the hit single "Tú", which was written by popular songwriter Estéfano. The song peaked at No. 5 on Billboard's Hot Latin Tracks chart. The album certified gold in several countries and sold over 800,000 copies worldwide.

== Track listing ==
1. "Tú" (Estéfano) – 4:51
2. "Demasiado Amor" (Donato, Estéfano) – 5:08
3. "Candela" (Estéfano) – 3:54
4. "Te Amo" (Estéfano) – 4:40
5. "Yo No Lo Entiendo" (Estéfano) – 4:21
6. "Te Odio" (Gandía, Rodolfo) – 4:26
7. "Hombres" (Estéfano) – 3:58
8. "Morir De Amor" (Acevedo, Marzello, Estéfano) – 4:22
9. "Júrame" (Quiroga, Gisela) – 3:59
10. "Toco La Luz" (Fuster, Mendo) – 4:15

== Singles ==
1. "Tú" (1999) No. 1 (4:40)
2. "Demasiado Amor" (1999) No. 3 (4:51)
3. "Toco La Luz" (1999) No. 1 (4:04)
4. "Candela" (1999) No. 1 (3:55)
5. "Te Amo" (2000) No. 4 (4:29)
6. "Te Odio" (2000) No. 2 (4:17)

== Charts ==
Chart (1999)	Peak position
US Top Latin Albums (Billboard)	7
US Latin Pop Albums (Billboard)	3
US Heatseekers Albums (Billboard)	17

== Certifications and sales ==
Region	Certification	Certified units/sales
Argentina (CAPIF)	Gold	30,000^{^}
Mexico (AMPROFON)	Gold	100,000
United States (RIAA)	Gold	500,000^{^}
Summaries
Worldwide	—	800,000
^{^} Shipments figures based on certification alone.
