= Golpeando Fuerte =

Studio album by Noelia
- Released: December 5, 2000
- Recorded: 2000
- Genres: Pop, Latin
- Length: 39:54
- Label: Fonovisa Records

Noelia chronology
Noelia (1999)	Golpeando Fuerte (2000)	Natural (2003)

Professional ratings
Review scores
Source	Rating
AllMusic	link

Golpeando Fuerte is the second album by Puerto Rican singer Noelia. The album was released in 2000 and peaked at number one on Billboard magazine's Top Latin Albums chart.

The album produced the hit single "Ni Una Lágrima Más", which was written by popular songwriter Estéfano. The song peaked at number two on Billboard's Hot Latin Tracks chart.

== Track listing ==
1. "Golpeando Fuerte" (Estéfano) – 4:10
2. "Con El Alma Abierta" (Donato, Estéfano) – 5:04
3. "Fuera" (Estéfano) – 3:35
4. "Me Faltas Tú" (Noelia, Estéfano) – 4:06
5. "A Toda Maquina " (Estéfano) – 3:45
6. "Ni Una Lágrima Mas " (Noelia, Estéfano, Donato) – 3:44
7. "Profecia " (Estéfano) – 3:38
8. "El Suspiro De Un Angel " (Noelia) – 3:23
9. "Cerra Derretida " (Noelia) – 4:12
10. "Tuya Completa" (Noelia, Estéfano) – 4:15

== Singles ==
1. "Ni Una Lágrima Más" (2000) #1
2. "Golpeando Fuerte" (2001) #1
3. "El Suspiro de Un Ángel" (2001) #1
4. "Cera Derretida" (2001) #4
5. "Me Faltas Tú" (2001) #1
6. "Profecía" (2002) #3
7. "Tuya Completa (only in Chile) (2002) #1

== Videoclips ==
- "Ni Una Lágrima Más" (2000) #1
- "Golpeando Fuerte" (2001) #1

== Charts ==
Chart (2000)	Peak position
US Top Latin Albums (Billboard)	26

== Sales ==
3.204.894.- (United World).
