= Tú (Noelia song) =

Single by Noelia

from the album Noelia
- Released: 1999
- Genre: Latin pop
- Length: 4:51
- Label: Fonovisa
- Songwriter: Estéfano

Noelia singles chronology
"Tú" (1999)	"Toco la Luz" (1999)

Music video
- "Tú" on YouTube

"Tú" (English: You) is a song performed by the Puerto Rican singer Noelia, taken from her debut studio album of the same name (1999). The song was released as her debut single and it was written by Estéfano with minor uncredited lyrics by Noelia. The song reached No. 5 on the Billboard Hot Latin Tracks chart, becoming her most successful singles on that chart and it is her signature song. "Tú" received a nomination for Pop Song of the Year at the 2000 Lo Nuestro Awards. It was acknowledged as an award-winning song at the 2000 BMI Latin Awards. The song has been covered by Norteño singer Carín León and merengue singer Miriam Cruz.

== Charts ==
=== Weekly charts ===
Chart (1999)	Peak position
US Hot Latin Songs (Billboard)	5
US Latin Pop Airplay (Billboard)	3
US Tropical Airplay (Billboard)	4

=== Year-end charts ===
1999 year-end chart performance for "Tú"
Chart (1999)	Position
US Hot Latin Songs (Billboard)	16
US Latin Pop Airplay (Billboard)	6

== Cover versions ==
The song was covered by Norteño singer Carín León in 2020. Noelia disapproved the version because he did not pay royalties for it. Andrea Mireille described it for Chilango as a Regional Mexican acoustic song.

Chart (2020)	Peak position
US Hot Latin Songs (Billboard)	21
US Regional Mexican Airplay (Billboard)	4

In 2015, Dominican merengue singer Miriam Cruz, a former lead singer of the all-female band Las Chicas del Can, recorded a merengue cover of the song. This version was included on her album Me Sacudí, released on September 16, 2015.
