= List of number-one hits of 1993 (Mexico) =

This is a list of the songs that reached number one in Mexico in 1993, according to the Notitas Musicales magazine with data provided by Radio Mil(which also provided charts for Billboard's "Hits of the World" between 1969 and 1981).

Notitas Musicales was a bi-weekly magazine that published two record charts:

- "Canciones que México canta" ("Songs that Mexico sings"), which listed the Top 10 most popular Spanish-language songs in Mexico, and
- "Éxitos internacionales en México" ("International hits in Mexico"), which listed the most popular songs in Mexico that were in languages other than Spanish.

== Chart history ==
Issue Date	Spanish-language songs		Other languages		Ref.
Issue Date	Song	Artist(s)	Song	Artist(s)	Ref.
January 1	"América, América"	Luis Miguel	N/A		
January 15	"América, América"	Luis Miguel	N/A		
February 1	"Cambiando el destino"	Magneto	N/A		
March 15	"Veleta"	Lucero	N/A		
April 1	"Veleta"	Lucero	"Dur dur d'être bébé!"	Jordy	
April 15	"Veleta"	Lucero	"Dur dur d'être bébé!"	Jordy	
May 1	"Veleta"	Lucero	"Dur dur d'être bébé!"	Jordy	
May 15	"Veleta"	Lucero	"Dur dur d'être bébé!"	Jordy	
June 1	"Háblame"	Ilse	"Dur dur d'être bébé!"	Jordy	
June 15	"Háblame"	Ilse	"Alison (C'est ma copine à moi)"	Jordy	
July 1	"Ayer"	Luis Miguel	"Alison (C'est ma copine à moi)"	Jordy	
July 15	"Ayer"	Luis Miguel	"Two Princes"	Spin Doctors	
August 1	"Ayer"	Luis Miguel	"Informer"	Snow	
August 15	"Nunca voy a olvidarte"	Cristian Castro	"Informer"	Snow	
September 1	"Nunca voy a olvidarte"	Cristian Castro	"Informer"	Snow	
September 15	"Nunca voy a olvidarte"	Cristian Castro	"Informer"	Snow	
October 1	"Nunca voy a olvidarte"	Cristian Castro	"What's Up?"	4 Non Blondes	
October 15	"Hasta que me olvides"	Luis Miguel	"What's Up?"	4 Non Blondes	
November 1	"Hasta que me olvides"	Luis Miguel	"What's Up?"	4 Non Blondes	
November 15	"Hasta que me olvides"	Luis Miguel	"What's Up?"	4 Non Blondes	
December 1	"Hasta que me olvides"	Luis Miguel	"Go West"	Pet Shop Boys	
December 15	"Detrás de mi ventana"	Yuri	"Go West"	Pet Shop Boys	

== See also ==
- 1993 in music

== Sources ==
- Print editions of the Notitas Musicales magazine.
