= Hasta Que Me Olvides =

1993 song by Luis Miguel

Single by Luis Miguel

from the album Aries
- Released: August 1993
- Studio: Ocean Way (Hollywood); Record One (Los Angeles); Larrabee (Hollywood); Ground Control (Los Angeles)
- Length: 4:40
- Label: WEA Latina
- Songwriter: Juan Luis Guerra
- Producers: Luis Miguel; Kiko Cibrian

Luis Miguel singles chronology
"Ayer" (1993)	"Hasta Que Me Olvides" (1993)	"Suave" (1993)

"Hasta Que Me Olvides"

Promotional single by Luis Miguel

from the album El Concierto
- Released: 1995
- Recorded: 1994
- Venue: National Auditorium (Mexico City, Mexico)
- Length: 4:25
- Label: WEA Latina
- Songwriter: Juan Luis Guerra
- Producers: Luis Miguel; Kiko Cibrian

"Hasta Que Me Olvides" (transl. "Until You Forget Me") is a song by Mexican singer Luis Miguel from his ninth studio album, Aries (1993). The song was composed by Dominican Republic singer-songwriter Juan Luis Guerra with Miguel and Kiko Cibrian handling the production. It was released as the album's second single in August 1993 by WEA Latina. A sentimental ballad, the song narrates the protagonist who insists on loving his partner until he is forgotten.

The ballad received positive reactions from music critics, who listed it among Miguel's best songs. "Hasta Que Me Olvides" was nominated in the category of Pop Song of the Year at the 1994 Lo Nuestro Awards and was a recipient of the Broadcast Music Inc. (BMI) Latin Award in 1995. Commercially, it became his ninth number one song on the Billboard Hot Latin Songs chart in the United States. The song was covered by Mexican entertainer Diego Boneta for the soundtrack of Luis Miguel: The Series (2018).

== Background and composition ==
In 1991 Miguel released his eighth studio album Romance, a collection of classic boleros. The album, which was produced by Armando Manzanero and arranged by Bebu Silvetti, was a commercial success in Latin America and sold over seven million copies worldwide. It revived interest in the bolero genre and was the first record by a Spanish-speaking artist to be certified gold in Brazil, Taiwan and the United States. In spite of the album's success, Miguel did not want to release a follow-up record that was similar to Romance. When asked why he chose not to record more boleros, he replied, "I wanted to try my music, just forgetting a little bit about those boleros that everyone knows." The singer began working with the composers for the album a year before recording in a studio in 1992; in Miguel's words, he wanted to "discuss the works, the themes, and melodies; ... The creation of an album has to be part of me or else I would not be able to interpret it, or sing in it."

On 24 August 1992, El Siglo de Torreón reported that Miguel had begun collaborating with David Foster and Juan Carlos Calderón on some compositions, along with English-speaking composers, and selecting cover versions for the album. Due to difficulty finding a suitable producer for the record, he decided to co-produce the album with his long-time associate Kiko Cibrian. A chance meeting with Dominican Republic singer-songwriter Juan Luis Guerra in Mexico, led to him writing "Hasta Que Me Olvides" in a napkin for Miguel which the artist recorded for Aries (1993). Composed by Guerra, it is a sentimental ballad in which the protagonist "will insist until his partner forgets him, so he waits for an opportunity to recover his love, but if he realizes that she no longer feels anything for him, he will make the decision to leave".

== Promotion and reception ==
"Hasta Que Me Olvides" was released as the album's second single in August 1993 by WEA Latina. The song was later included on his greatest hits album Grandes Éxitos (2005). A live version of the song was featured on his live album El Concierto (1995) (which was recorded from his Segundo Romance Tour in August 1994), and was released as a promotional single in Spain in the same year. On the review of the album, the Sun-Sentinel's John Lannert praised Miguel for "crooning seductively on Juan Luis Guerra`s emotion-drenched love ode". La Prensa de San Antonio author Diana Raquel commended the track, along with "Tu y Yo", for exerting "eternal poetry". The track was listed among "10 Luis Miguel Songs You Should Know" by Emily Paulín on Sonica and "20 Best Luis Miguel Songs to Listen on YouTube Music" by an editor for El Comercio.

"Hasta Que Me Olvides" was nominated in the category of Pop Song of the Year at the 6th Annual Lo Nuestro Awards in 1994, but ultimately lost to "Nunca Voy a Olvidarte" by Cristian Castro. It was acknowledged as an award-winning song at the 1995 BMI Latin Awards. Commercially, it topped the Billboard Hot Latin Songs chart in the US, becoming his ninth number one single on the chart. In 2021, Mexican entertainer Diego Boneta covered "Hasta Que Me Olvides" on the soundtrack for the second season of Luis Miguel: The Series (2018).

== Personnel ==
Adapted from the Aries liner notes:

Performance credits

- Randy Kerber – keyboards, arranger
- John Robinson – drums
- Paul Jackson Jr. – rhythmic guitar
- Dean Parks – acoustic guitar
- Paulinho da Costa – percussion
- Neil Stubenhaus – bass
- The Hollywood String Ensemble – orchestra
- Ezra Kliger – concertmaster, violin
- Paul C. Shure – violin
- Shari Zippert – violin
- Roman Volodarsky – violin
- Barbara J. Porter – violin
- Vladimir Polimatidi – violin
- Cordon H. Marron – violin
- Charles H. Everett – violin
- Norman J. Hughes – violin
- Joel Derouin – violin
- Sid Page – violin
- Linda Rose – violin
- R.F. Peterson – violin
- John J. Wittenberg – violin
- Leslie J. Woodbury – violin
- Endre Granat – violin
- Alexander Horvath – violin
- Israel Baker – violin
- Herschel P. Wiserenita Koven – viola
- Raymond J. Tisher II – viola
- James J. Ross – viola
- John T. Acevedo – viola
- Cynthia Morrow – viola
- Larry Corbett – cello
- Daniel W. Smith – cello
- Nancy Stein – cello
- Roger Lebow – cello
- Steve G. Edelman – contrabass
- Jon C. Clarke – English horn, oboe
- Joseph Meyer – French horn
- Calvin Smith – French horn
- Michael A. Englander – percussion

Technical credits

- Luis Miguel – producer
- Kiko Cibrian – co-producer
- Mauricio Abaroa – executive producer
- Julio Saenz – executive producer
- Benny Faccone – engineer, mixing
- Jim Champagne – assistant engineer, mixing assistant
- Noel Hazen – assistant engineer, mixing assistant
- Bernie Grundman – mastering
- Alfredo Gatica – artistic coordination
- Ezra Kliger – production coordination
- Jose Quintana – production coordination

== Charts ==
=== Weekly charts ===
Chart performance for "Hasta Que Me Olvides"
Chart (1993)	Peak position
Chile (UPI)	10
Dominican Republic (UPI)	2
Mexico (UPI)	1
Panama (UPI)	1
US Hot Latin Songs (Billboard)	1
Uruguay (UPI)	3
Venezuela (UPI)	4

Chart (2021)	Peak position
Argentina Hot 100 (Billboard)	87

=== Year-end charts ===
1993 year-end chart performance for "Hasta Que Me Olvides"
Chart (1993)	Position
US Hot Latin Songs (Billboard)	11

== Certifications ==
Region	Certification	Certified units/sales
Spain (Promusicae)	Gold	30,000^{‡}
^{‡} Sales+streaming figures based on certification alone.

== See also ==
- List of number-one hits of 1993 (Mexico)
- List of number-one Billboard Hot Latin Tracks of 1993
