= Premio Lo Nuestro 1994 =

Latin Music awards show

6th Lo Nuestro Awards
- Date: Thursday, May 19, 1994
- Site: James L. Knight Center; Miami, Florida, USA
- Hosted by: Paul Rodriguez

Highlights
- Most awards: Gloria Estefan and La Mafia (3)
- Most nominations: Luis Miguel (5)

The 6th Lo Nuestro Awards ceremony, presented by the Univision, honored the best Latin music of 1993 and 1994 and took place on May 19, 1994, at a live presentation held at the James L. Knight Center in Miami, Florida. The ceremony was broadcast in the United States and Latin America by Univision.

During the ceremony, twenty categories were presented. Winners were announced at the live event and included Cuban-American singer Gloria Estefan and Tejano band La Mafia, each receiving three awards, and Luis Miguel and Wilfrido Vargas, each receiving two awards. Among its honors, Miguel won the award for "Pop Album of the Year," La Mafia for "Regional Mexican Album of the Year," and Estefan won the award for "Tropical/Salsa Album of the Year." Cuban-American record producer Emilio Estefan received the Excellence Award.

== Background ==
In 1989, the Lo Nuestro Awards were established by Univision, to recognize the most talented performers of Latin music. The nominees were selected by Univision and the winners chosen by the public. The categories included are for the Pop, Tropical/Salsa, Regional Mexican and Rap genres, and Music Video. The trophy awarded is shaped like a treble clef. The 6th Lo Nuestro Award ceremony was held on May 19, 1994, in a live presentation held at the James L. Knight Center in Miami, Florida. The ceremony was broadcast in United States and Latin America by Univision.

== Winners and nominees ==
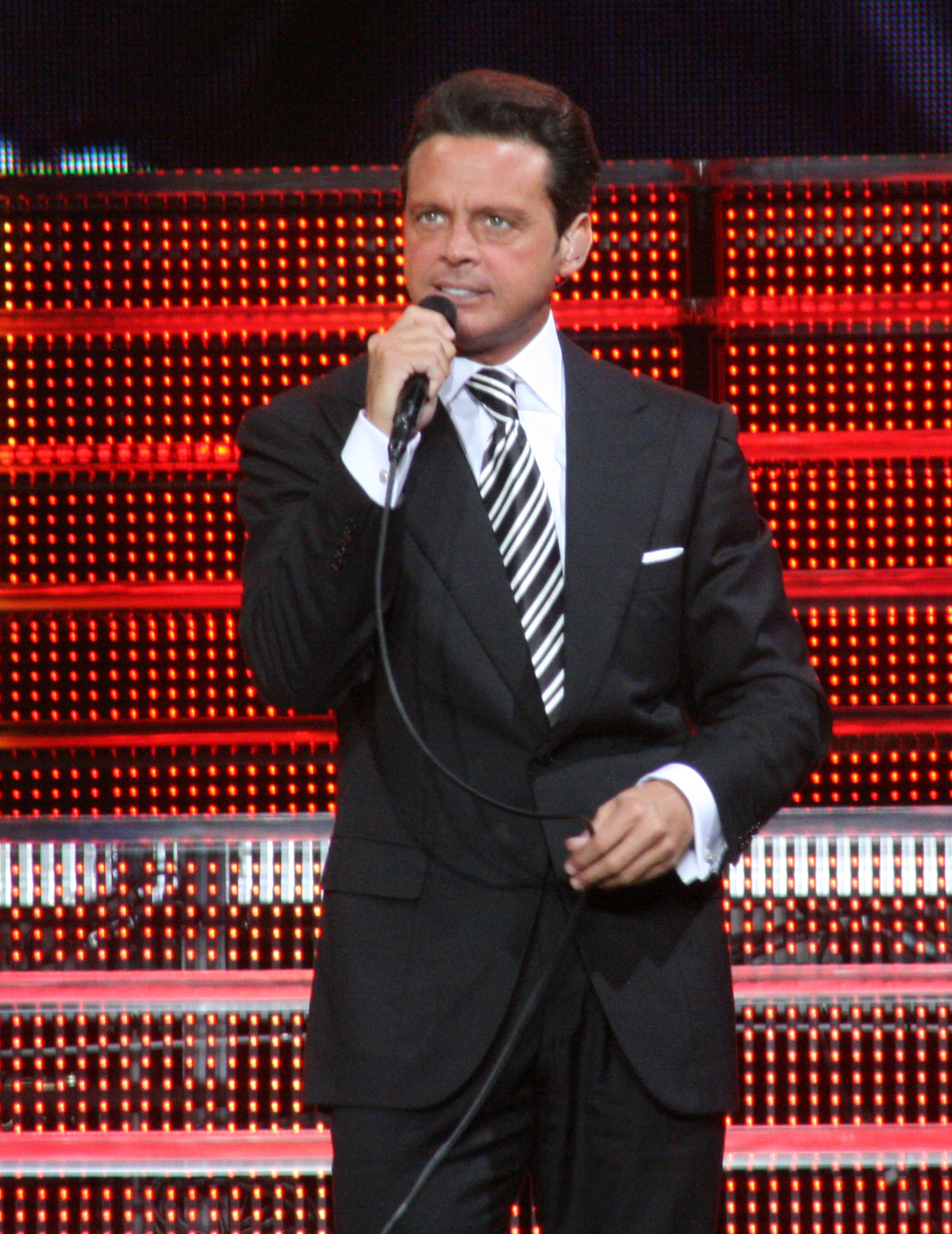
Mexican performer Luis Miguel (pictured in 2009), won the Lo Nuestro for Pop Album and Pop Male Artist of 1994

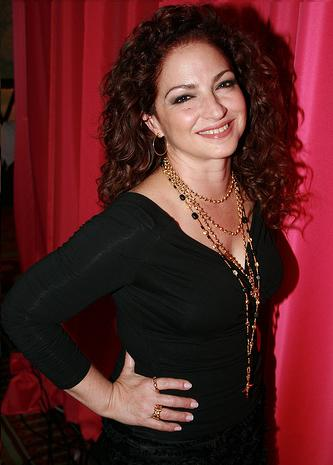
Cuban-American performer Gloria Estefan (pictured in 2009), three-time winner in 1994

Winners were announced before the live audience during the ceremony. Mexican singer Luis Miguel was the most nominated performer, with five nominations, including Pop Album (Aries), Male Artist, Pop Song ("Ayer" and "Hasta Que Me Olvides"), and Video of the Year ("Ayer"). Miguel was awarded in the first two categories, with fellow Mexican singer Cristian Castro winning for Pop Song for the single "Nunca Voy a Olvidarte", and Spanish singer Rosario Flores receiving the accolade for Video of the Year for "Sabor, Sabor". All the songs nominated for Pop Song of the Year, Miguel's "Ayer" and "Hasta Que Me Olvides", "Con Los Años Que Me Quedan" by Gloria Estefan, "Muchacha Triste" by Los Fantasmas del Caribe, and Castro's "Nunca Voy a Olvidarte", reached number-one at the Billboard Top Latin Songs chart. Tejano band La Mafia dominated the Regional Mexican field winning all their nominations, including Album of the Year (Ahora y Siempre), Regional Mexican Song ("Me Estoy Enamorando") and Group of the Year. Mi Tierra by Cuban-American singer Gloria Estefan was named Tropical/Salsa Album of the Year, and Estefan received the Female Artist Pop and Tropical/Salsa Artist awards. Estefan's husband, record producer Emilio Estefan earned the Excellence Award.

Winners and nominees of the 6th Annual Lo Nuestro Awards (winners listed first)
| Pop Album of the Year | Pop Song of the Year |
|---|---|
| Luis Miguel – Aries; Ana Gabriel – Luna; Ednita Nazario – Metamorfosis; Jon Secada – Otro Día Más Sin Verte; Marco Antonio Solís and Los Bukis – Inalcanzable | Cristian Castro – "Nunca Voy a Olvidarte"; Gloria Estefan – "Con Los Años Que Me Quedan"; Los Fantasmas del Caribe – "Muchacha Triste"; Luis Miguel – "Ayer"; Luis Miguel – "Hasta Que Me Olvides" |
| Male Artist of the Year, Pop | Female Artist of the Year, Pop |
| Luis Miguel; Cristian Castro; Jon Secada; Álvaro Torres | Gloria Estefan; Ana Gabriel; Lucero; Ednita Nazario |
| Pop Group of the Year | Pop New Artist of the Year |
| Los Bukis; Pandora; Barrio Boyzz; Los Fantasmas del Caribe | Los Fantasmas del Caribe; Ricardo Arjona; Barrio Boyzz; The Triplets |
| Regional Mexican Album of the Year | Regional Mexican Song of the Year |
| La Mafia – Ahora y Siempre; Banda Machos – Con Sangre de Indio; Bronco – Por El Mundo; Mazz – Lo Haré Por Ti; Selena – Live! | La Mafia – "Me Estoy Enamorando"; Bronco – "Dos Mujeres, Un Camino"; Los Bukis – "Morenita"; Vicente Fernández – "Lástima Que Seas Ajena"; Selena – "No Debes Jugar" |
| Male Artist of the Year, Regional Mexican | Female Artist of the Year, Regional Mexican |
| Alejandro Fernández; Vicente Fernández; Emilio Navaira; Joan Sebastian | Selena; Elsa García; Laura León; Linda Ronstadt |
| Regional Mexican Group of the Year | Regional Mexican New Artist of the Year |
| La Mafia; Los Bukis; Bronco; Mazz | Fama; Pepe Aguilar; Los Carlos; Elsa García |
| Tropical/Salsa Album of the Year | Tropical/Salsa Song of the Year |
| Gloria Estefan – Mi Tierra; Juan Luis Guerra y 440 – Areíto; Jerry Rivera – Cara de Niño; Gilberto Santa Rosa – Nace Aquí; Olga Tañón – Mujer de Fuego | Wilfrido Vargas – "El Baile del Perrito"; Marc Anthony – "Hasta Que Te Conocí"; Edgar Joel – "Hasta el Sol de Hoy"; Juan Luis Guerra y 440 – "Coronita de Flores"; Johnny Ventura – "Pitaste?" |
| Male Artist of the Year, Tropical/Salsa | Female Artist of the Year, Tropical/Salsa |
| Jerry Rivera; Marc Anthony; Rey Ruiz; Gilberto Santa Rosa | Gloria Estefan; Celia Cruz; Linda Ronstadt; Olga Tañón |
| Tropical/Salsa Group of the Year | Tropical/Salsa New Artist of the Year |
| Wilfrido Vargas y su Orquesta; Hermanos Rosario; Juan Luis Guerra y 440; Pochy y su Cocoband | Marc Anthony; Edgar Joel; Víctor Manuelle; Johnny Rivera |
| Rap Artist of the Year | Video of the Year |
| Proyecto Uno; El General; Ruben DJ; Vico C | Rosario Flores – "Sabor, Sabor"; Los Bukis – "Tu Ingratitud"; Café Tacuba – "Rarotonga"; Juan Luis Guerra y 440 – "Coronita de Flores"; Alejandra Guzmán – "Mírala, Míralo"; Luis Enrique – "La Mañana"; Luis Miguel – "Ayer"; Maná – "Vivir Sin Aire"; Eros Ramazzotti – "Otra Como Tú"; Edi Xol – "Somos" |

== See also ==
- 1993 in Latin music
