= Noelia =

Puerto Rican pop singer, songwriter (born 1979)

- Born: Noelia Lorenzo Monge; August 31, 1979 (age 47); San Juan, Puerto Rico
- Genres: Pop; dance-pop; EDM
- Occupations: Singer; songwriter; entrepreneur
- Years active: 1999–present
- Labels: Fonovisa (1999–2004); EMI (2005–2007); Pink Star (2007–present)
- Website: noeliaofficial.com

Noelia Lorenzo (née Monge) mostly known as Noelia, is a Mexican-Puerto Rican singer, songwriter and entrepreneur who rose to fame in 1999.

Her self-titled debut album was certified as a RIAA gold album in the United States. During her career, she has had 10 Latin Billboard top 40 hits and five top 40 Billboard Dance/Club Play Songs chart hits. She is a Latin Billboard Award winner.

== Musical career ==
Noelia started working on her first full-length album in 1998. The self-titled album was released in 1999, making her debut at the Madison Square Garden. The album produced the hit single "Tú", written by Estéfano. The album was certified gold in the U.S.

In 2000 she released her second album, Golpeando Fuerte. Her third album, Natural, released in 2003 featured another hit song, "Clávame Tu Amor", which peaked at No. 5 on Billboard Hot Latin Tracks. The album also featured songwriting contributions from Latin Producer Kike Santander and Jose Gaviria.

In 2004, she released her fourth studio album, titled Melao, which was a fusion of pop with reggaeton. The album was produced by reggaeton producer, DJ Eric, and features Yamil sharing lead vocals with Noelia. They also co-wrote most of the songs of the album.

In 2006, she returned to her musical roots with the album 40 Grados, produced by Adrián Posse. The album featured the single "Como Duele", which was nominated by Billboard as Pop Song of the Year. The song was also chosen as the theme for the Mexican telenovela Barrera de Amor and peaked at No. 8 on Billboard Hot Latin Songs.

In 2007, she released her sixth full-length album titled Volverte a Ver.

She then worked on two albums, her first English single for the European market was titled "Caribbean Queen". It was released in May 2009 mostly in Italy. The song is a cover version of Billy Ocean's hit song of 1984 with added lyrics by Noelia.

In mid-2011 Noelia broke a record for Hispanic online audience in the U.S. with her online concert produced by Hispanic Media Giant Univision. "In Studio" with Noelia on Univision.com attracted more than 3.5 million viewers.

In 2012 Noelia released the single "Kiss Me". On April 2 it appeared in the Billboard Charts both in the Dance and Latin Hot Track categories.

On June 15, 2013, Noelia launched her "Mind Blown" Tour at the House of Blues on Sunset in West Hollywood California. In October 2013 she released the "Mind Blown" music video, which reached more than 1 million views combined in less than 15 days.

February 2014 Noelia made another Hot Shot Debut on the Billboard Charts with "Mind Blown" produced by Timbaland and remixed by DJs Dave Aude, Tracy Young and Dan De Leon

In July 2018 Noelia released the first single from the new album "La mas Completa Coleccion". This is a remake of her song "Clávame tu Amor" recorded with Mexican Banda and Norteño Sounds.

In total, Noelia has sold almost 10 million albums worldwide.

== Philanthropy ==
Noelia is a supporter of the Boys and Girls Club of East Los Angeles.

Noelia also supports the "Juarez Sin Frio" Initiative, a movement to raise funds to provide warm clothing and portable heaters to the villages in the high altitude mountains of the Mexican state of Chihuahua.

== Entrepreneur ==
Noelia is the founder and creator of "Noelicious", a woman's lingerie and sexy clothing brand; she is also the founder of Noelia's Cabaret, an adult entertainment club chain.

In 2020, Noelia founded the company "Protecciones Comerciales de México" (Protecom) company dedicated to the production of acrylic products, such as masks, screens, and dividers in Mexico. Also in 2020, she was named entrepreneur leader of the year by the magazine "Executive Woman" in the edition of the 30 business leaders of Mexico.

By the end of 2021, Noelia launched two social media platforms – Celebriffy and Cherryland.vip. Celebriffy is a full social media platform with the features found in Facebook, YouTube and Instagram but content creators can monetize their content. Celebriffy is already available at Appstore and Playstore. Noelia has stated that the company that she commands and owns has a staff of more than 65 engineers who wrote and maintain the proprietary code of the platforms.

In November 2021, Noelia launched her own branded Mastercard Debit Card Program for the general market in the U.S.

== Personal life ==
Noelia, the first daughter of Puerto Rican singer and actress Yolandita Monge and Uruguayan businessman Alfredo Lorenzo, showed interest in music from childhood. Noelia has two half-siblings from Monge's subsequent marriages. In 2007 she secretly married Mexican American aviation entrepreneur and music producer Jorge Reynoso in Las Vegas, Nevada. Noelia is a Mexican national.

In June 2007, a sex tape of Noelia and her ex-boyfriend Yamil engaged in anal intercourse was leaked on the Internet.

== Discography ==
=== Studio albums ===
- Noelia (1999)
- Golpeando Fuerte (2000)
- Natural (2003)
- Melao (2004)
- 40 Grados (2005)
- Volverte a Ver (2007)

=== EPs ===
- Mind Blown (2013)
- Spell (2014)
- Explode (2016)

=== Singles ===
Year	Title	Album	Chart positions	
Year	Title	Album	Hot Latin Tracks	Hot Dance Club Play
1999	"Tú"	Noelia	5	-
1999	"Toco la Luz"	Noelia	32	-
1999	"Candela"	Noelia	27	-
2001	"Ni Una Lágrima Más"	Golpeando Fuerte	15	-
2003	"Ya No Eres El Mismo"	Natural	24	-
2003	"Clávame Tu Amor"	Natural	5	-
2004	"Ya No Eres El Mismo" (Notty Cotto Mixes)	Natural	-	40
2004	"Enamorada"	Natural	26	-
2006	"Como Duele"	40 Grados	8	-
2008	"Caribbean Queen Reloaded"	Non-album Single	-	-
2010	"Here I Go Again"	Non-album Single	-	-
2012	"Kiss Me (feat. Baby Boy")	Non-album Single	14	16
2013	"My Everything"	Mind Blown	-	2
2014	"Mind Blown"	Mind Blown	-	16
2015	"Spell"	Spell	-	6
2020	"Broken"	Non-album Single	-	-
