= Lo Nuestro Award for Pop Song of the Year =

Latin music award category

Lo Nuestro Awards for Pop Song of the Year
- Current: Premio Lo Nuestro 2019
- Awarded for: Pop Song of the Year
- Country: United States
- Presented by: Univision
- First award: 1989
- Currently held by: CNCO (2017)

Highlights
- Most awards: Enrique Iglesias (4)
- Most nominations: Enrique Iglesias (10)
- Website: univision.com/premiolonuestro

The Lo Nuestro Award for Pop Song of the Year is an honor presented annually by American television network Univision at the Lo Nuestro Awards. The accolade was established to recognize the most talented performers of Latin music. The nominees and winners were originally selected by a voting poll conducted among program directors of Spanish-language radio stations in the United States and also based on chart performance on Billboard Latin music charts, with the results being tabulated and certified by the accounting firm Deloitte. However, since 2004, the winners are selected through an online survey. The trophy awarded is shaped in the form of a treble clef.

The award was first presented to "Qué Te Pasa" by Mexican singer Yuri. Spanish performer Enrique Iglesias holds the record for the most awards, winning four times on three different decades, "Si Tú Te Vas" (1996), "Experiencia Religiosa" (1997), "¿Dónde Están Corazón?" (2009), and "Bailando" (2015). Puerto Rican-American singer Ricky Martin has received the award three times, and is the current holder (as of 2016) with "Disparo al Corazón". Mexican performers Camila, Ana Gabriel, Juan Gabriel, and Luis Miguel, and Colombian singer-songwriter Shakira received the award twice. Puerto Rican singer Chayanne is the most nominated artist without a win, with eight unsuccessful nominations.

== Winners and nominees ==
Listed below are the winners of the award for each year, as well as the other nominees for the majority of the years awarded.

| Key | Meaning |
|---|---|
| ‡ | Indicates the winning song |

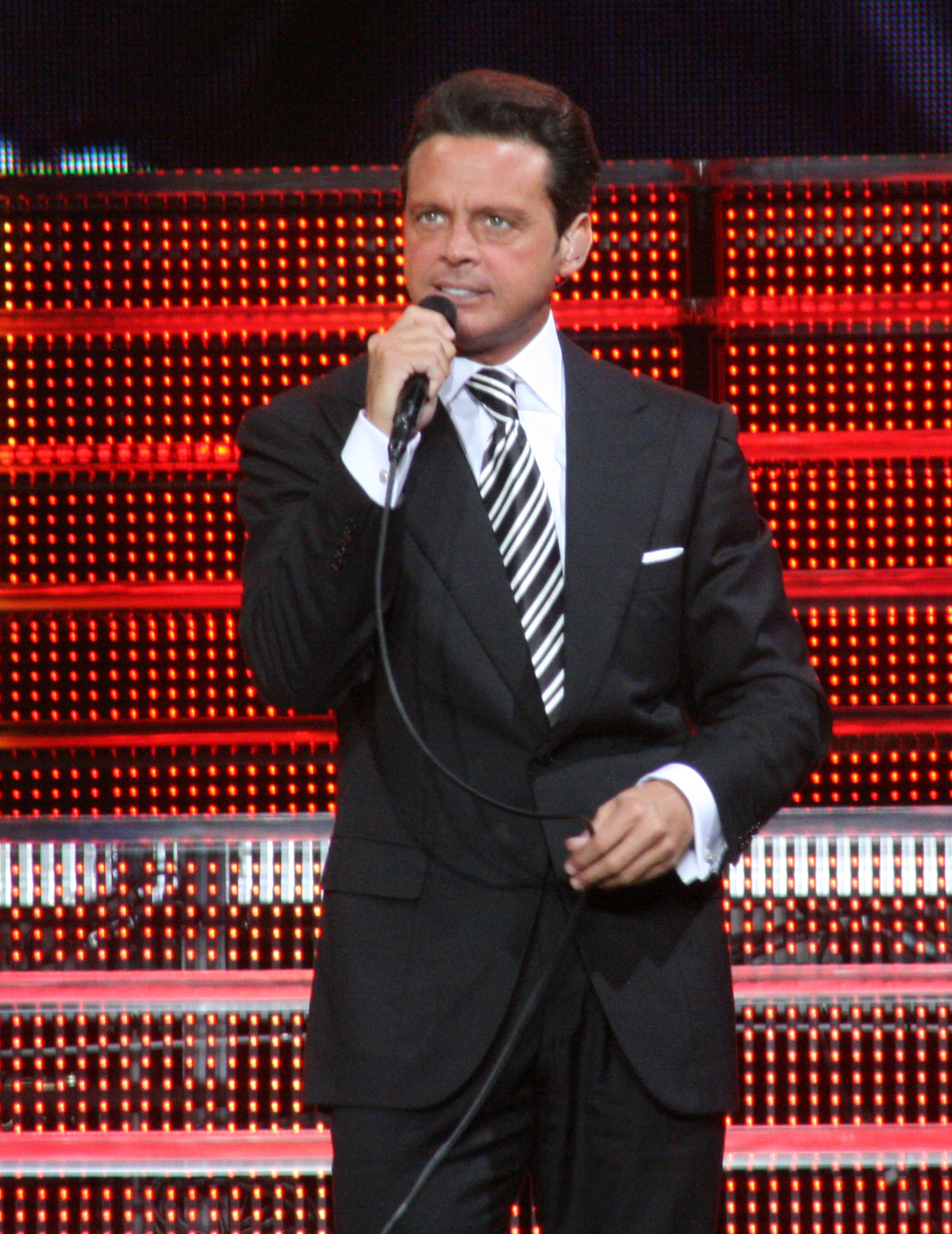
Mexican performer Luis Miguel (pictured in 2008), winner in 1990 and 1993

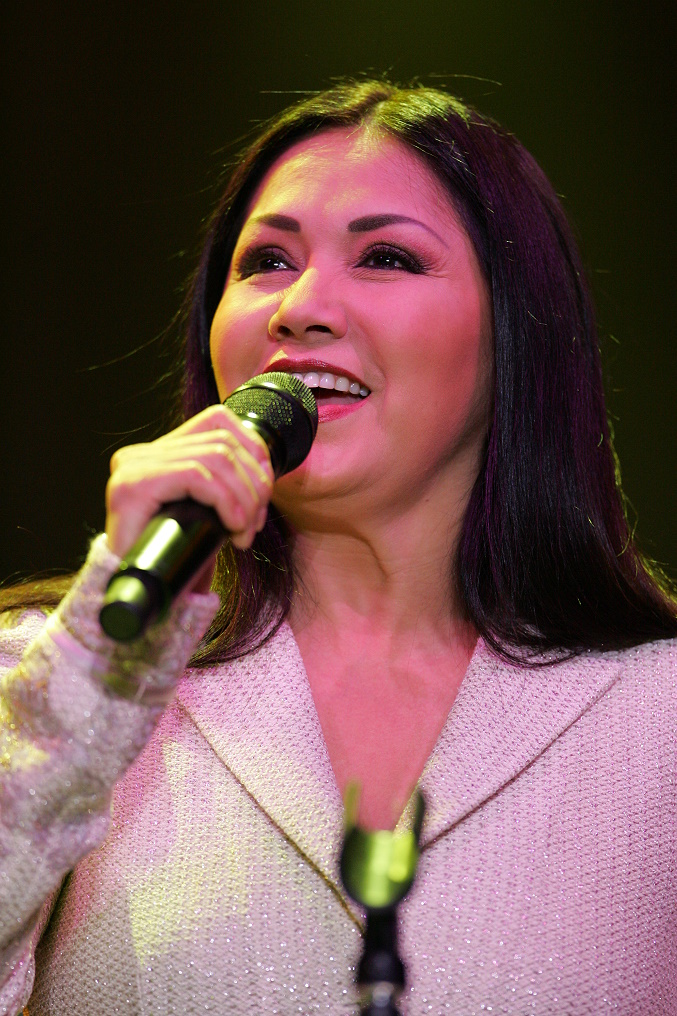
Mexican singer Ana Gabriel (pictured in 2006), winner in 1991 and 1992

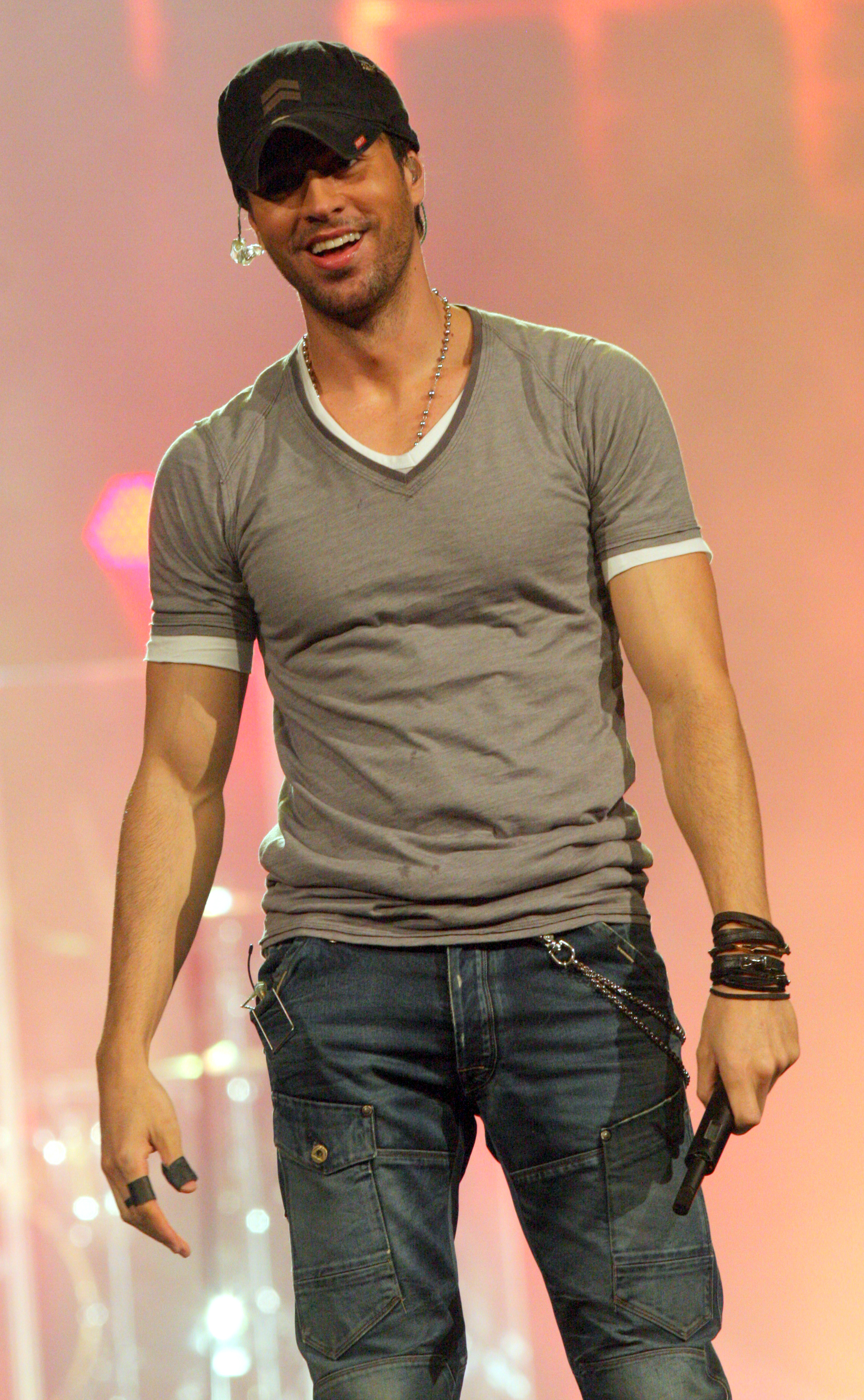
Spanish singer Enrique Iglesias (pictured in 2011), winner in 1996, 1997, 2009 and 2015

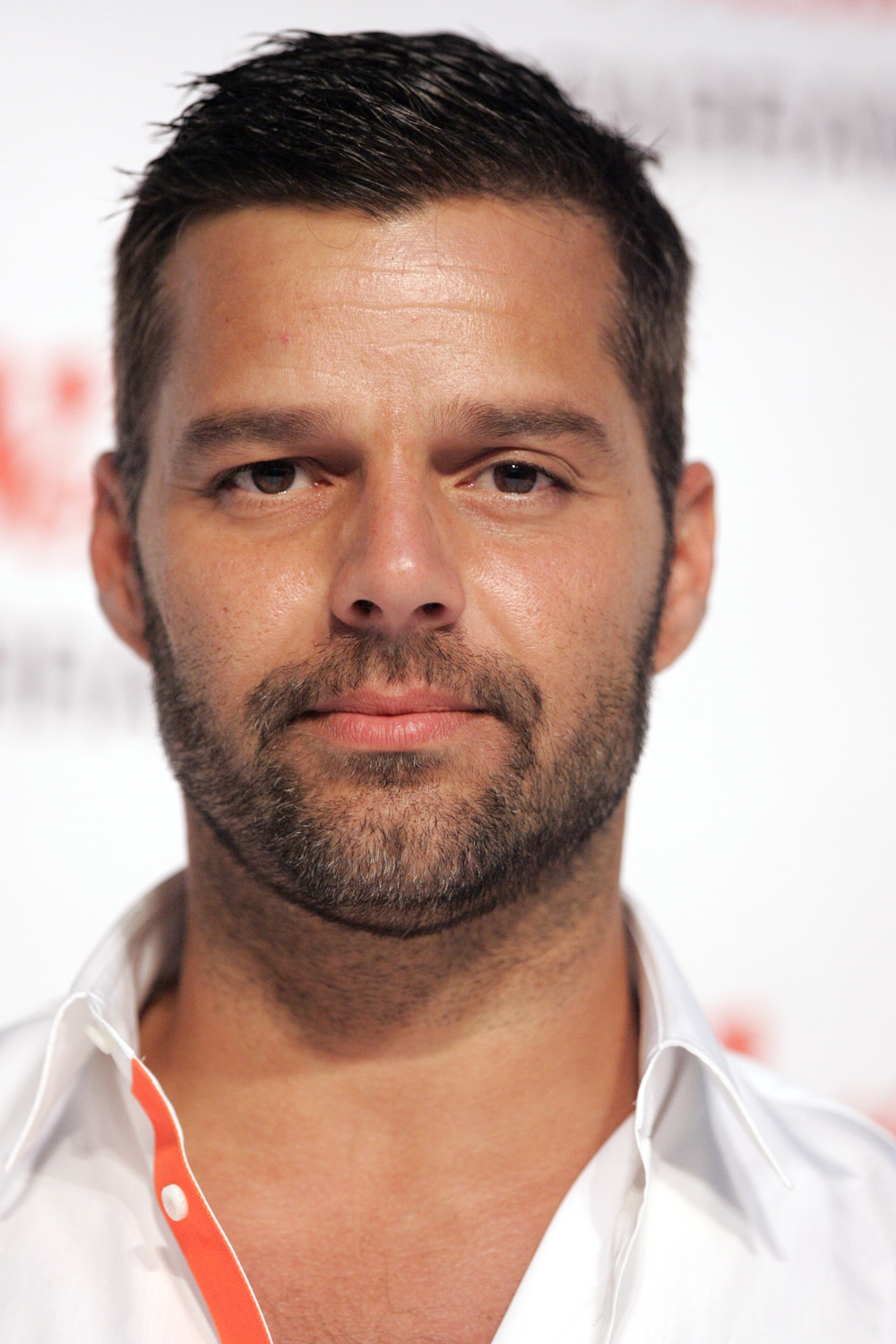
Puerto-Rican American singer Ricky Martin (pictured in 2013), winner in 1999, 2000 and 2016

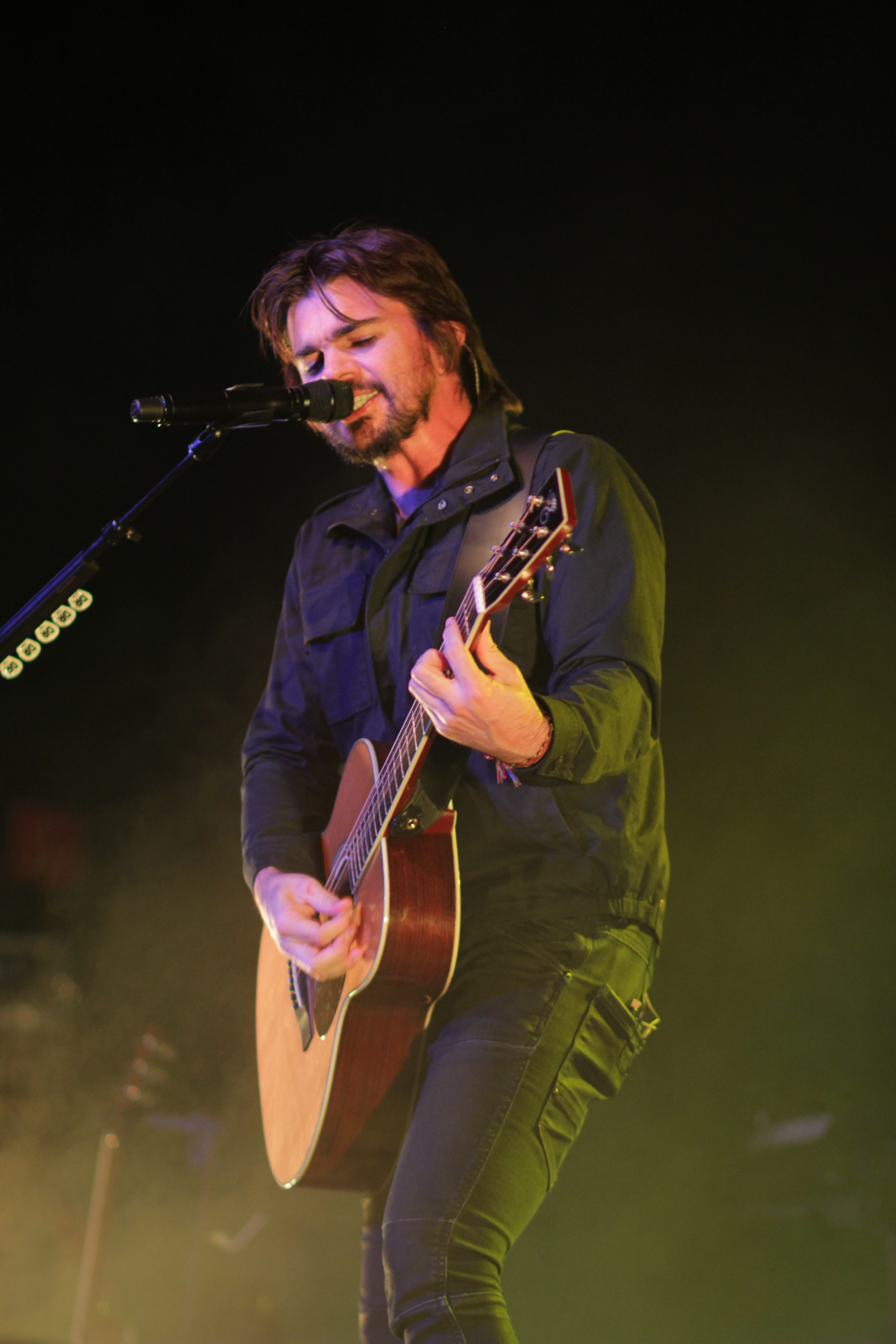
Colombian performer Juanes (pictured in 2012), winner in 2003

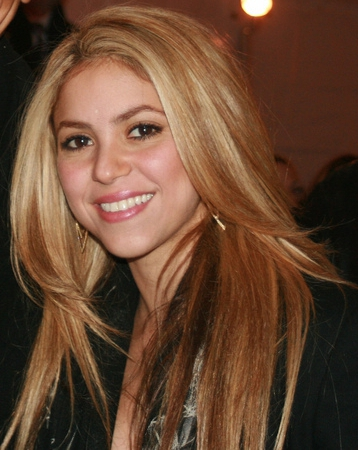
Colombian performer Shakira (pictured in 2009), winner in 2006 and 2012

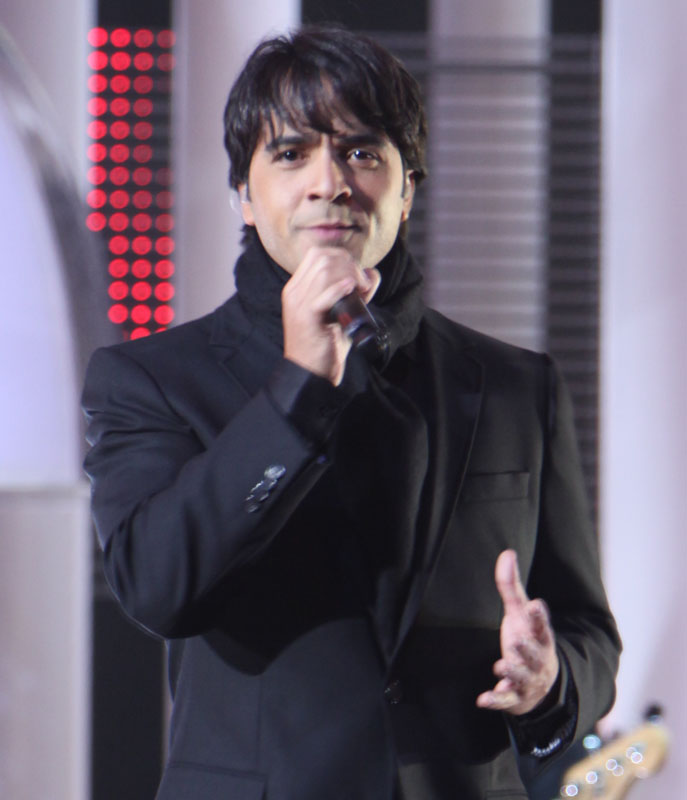
Puerto-Rican American performer Luis Fonsi (pictured in 2009), winner in 2010

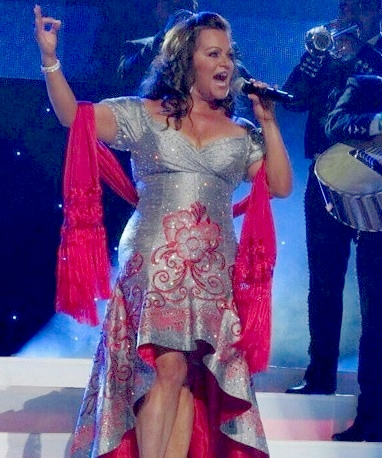
Mexican-American singer Jenni Rivera (pictured in 2012), winner in 2013 and 2014. Only winner to win posthumously for 2 consecutive times.

| Year | Song | Performer(s) | Ref |
|---|---|---|---|
| 1989 (1st) | "Qué Te Pasa"‡ | Yuri | |
| 1989 (1st) | "Boca Rosa" | Angela Carrasco | |
| 1989 (1st) | "Como Tu Mujer" | Rocío Dúrcal | |
| 1989 (1st) | "María" | Franco | |
| 1989 (1st) | "Toco Madera" | Raphael | |
| 1990 (2nd) | "La Incondicional"‡ | Luis Miguel | |
| 1990 (2nd) | "Baila Mi Rumba" | José Luis Rodríguez | |
| 1990 (2nd) | "Como Tú" | José José | |
| 1990 (2nd) | "Simplemente Amigos" | Ana Gabriel | |
| 1990 (2nd) | "Te Amo" | Franco De Vita | |
| 1991 (3rd) | "Es Demasiado Tarde"‡ | Ana Gabriel | |
| 1991 (3rd) | "Completamente Enamorados" | Chayanne | |
| 1991 (3rd) | "El Cariño Es Como Una Flor" | Rudy La Scala | |
| 1991 (3rd) | "Quién Como Tú" | Ana Gabriel | |
| 1991 (3rd) | "Tengo Todo Excepto a Ti" | Luis Miguel | |
| 1992 (4th) | "Cosas del Amor"‡ | Vikki Carr and Ana Gabriel | |
| 1992 (4th) | "Amor Mío, ¿Qué Me Has Hecho?" | Camilo Sesto | |
| 1992 (4th) | "Déjame Llorar" | Ricardo Montaner | |
| 1992 (4th) | "Mi Deseo" | Los Bukis | |
| 1992 (4th) | "Todo, Todo, Todo" | Daniela Romo | |
| 1993 (5th) | "No Sé Tú"‡ | Luis Miguel | |
| 1993 (5th) | "Angel" | Jon Secada | |
| 1993 (5th) | "El Centro de Mi Corazón" | Chayanne | |
| 1993 (5th) | "Evidencias" | Ana Gabriel | |
| 1993 (5th) | "Castillo Azul" | Ricardo Montaner | |
| 1994 (6th) | "Nunca Voy a Olvidarte"‡ | Cristian Castro | |
| 1994 (6th) | "Ayer" | Luis Miguel | |
| 1994 (6th) | "Con Los Años Que Me Quedan" | Gloria Estefan | |
| 1994 (6th) | "Hasta Que Me Olvides" | Luis Miguel | |
| 1994 (6th) | "Muchacha Triste" | Los Fantasmas del Caribe | |
| 1995 (7th) | "Pero Qué Necesidad"‡ | Juan Gabriel | |
| 1995 (7th) | "El Día Que Me Quieras" | Luis Miguel | |
| 1995 (7th) | "Luna" | Ana Gabriel | |
| 1995 (7th) | "Mañana" | Cristian Castro | |
| 1995 (7th) | "Vida" | La Mafia | |
| 1996 (8th) | "Si Tú Te Vas"‡ | Enrique Iglesias | |
| 1996 (8th) | "Llora Corazón" | José José | |
| 1996 (8th) | "Piel Morena" | Thalía | |
| 1996 (8th) | "Vuélveme a Querer" | Cristian Castro | |
| 1996 (8th) | "Si Nos Dejan" | Luis Miguel | |
| 1997 (9th) | "Experiencia Religiosa"‡ | Enrique Iglesias | |
| 1997 (9th) | "Amame Una Vez Más" | Amanda Miguel | |
| 1997 (9th) | "¡Basta Ya!" | Olga Tañón | |
| 1997 (9th) | "Estoy Aquí" | Shakira | |
| 1997 (9th) | "Por Amarte" | Enrique Iglesias | |
| 1998 (10th) | "Si Tú Supieras"‡ | Alejandro Fernández | |
| 1998 (10th) | "El Destino" | Juan Gabriel and Rocío Dúrcal | |
| 1998 (10th) | "Lo Mejor de Mí" | Cristian Castro | |
| 1998 (10th) | "Por Debajo de la Mesa" | Luis Miguel | |
| 1998 (10th) | "Te Sigo Amando" | Juan Gabriel | |
| 1999 (11th) | "La Copa de la Vida"‡ | Ricky Martin | |
| 1999 (11th) | "Dejaría Todo" | Chayanne | |
| 1999 (11th) | "Vuelve" | Ricky Martin | |
| 1999 (11th) | "Corazón Partío" | Alejandro Sanz | |
| 1999 (11th) | "Ciega, Sordomuda" | Shakira | |
| 2000 (12th) | "Livin' la Vida Loca"‡ | Ricky Martin | |
| 2000 (12th) | "Bailamos" | Enrique Iglesias | |
| 2000 (12th) | "Desnuda" | Ricardo Arjona | |
| 2000 (12th) | "Dímelo" | Marc Anthony | |
| 2000 (12th) | "Tú" | Noelia | |
| 2001 (13th) | "A Puro Dolor"‡ | Son By Four | |
| 2001 (13th) | "Amarte Es Un Placer" | Luis Miguel | |
| 2001 (13th) | "Atado a Tu Amor" | Chayanne | |
| 2001 (13th) | "Llegar a Ti" | Jaci Velasquez | |
| 2001 (13th) | "Muy Dentro de Mi" | Marc Anthony | |
| 2002 (14th) | "Abrázame Muy Fuerte"‡ | Juan Gabriel | |
| 2002 (14th) | "Azul" | Cristian Castro | |
| 2002 (14th) | "Cómo Se Cura Una Herida" | Jaci Velasquez | |
| 2002 (14th) | "O Me Voy o Te Vas" | Marco Antonio Solís | |
| 2002 (14th) | "Y Yo Sigo Aquí" | Paulina Rubio | |
| 2003 (15th) | "A Dios le Pido"‡ | Juanes | |
| 2003 (15th) | "Quítame Ese Hombre"‡ | Pilar Montenegro | |
| 2003 (15th) | "Entra en Mi Vida" | Sin Bandera | |
| 2003 (15th) | "Suerte" | Shakira | |
| 2003 (15th) | "Y Tú Te Vas" | Chayanne | |
| 2004 (16th) | "Mariposa Traicionera"‡ | Maná | |
| 2004 (16th) | "El Problema" | Ricardo Arjona | |
| 2004 (16th) | "No Me Enseñaste" | Thalía | |
| 2004 (16th) | "Que Me Quedes Tú" | Shakira | |
| 2004 (16th) | "Tal Vez" | Ricky Martin | |
| 2005 (17th) | "Que Lloro"‡ | Sin Bandera | |
| 2005 (17th) | "Cuidarte el Alma" | Chayanne | |
| 2005 (17th) | "Rosas" | La Oreja de Van Gogh | |
| 2005 (17th) | "Te Quise Tanto" | Paulina Rubio | |
| 2005 (17th) | "Y Todo Queda en Nada" | Ricky Martin | |
| 2006 (18th) | "La Tortura"‡ | Shakira featuring Alejandro Sanz | |
| 2006 (18th) | "La Camisa Negra" | Juanes | |
| 2006 (18th) | "Nada Es Para Siempre" | Luis Fonsi | |
| 2006 (18th) | "Víveme" | Laura Pausini | |
| 2006 (18th) | "Volverte a Ver" | Juanes | |
| 2007 (19th) | "No, No, No"‡ | Thalía featuring Romeo Santos | |
| 2007 (19th) | "Amor Eterno" | Cristian Castro | |
| 2007 (19th) | "Por Una Mujer" | Luis Fonsi | |
| 2007 (19th) | "Que Me Alcance la Vida" | Sin Bandera | |
| 2007 (19th) | "Te Echo de Menos" | Chayanne | |
| 2008 (20th) | "Todo Cambió"‡ | Camila | |
| 2008 (20th) | "Chiquilla" | A.B. Quintanilla presents Kumbia All Starz | |
| 2008 (20th) | "Dímelo" | Enrique Iglesias | |
| 2008 (20th) | "Me Muero" | La 5ª Estación | |
| 2008 (20th) | "Tu Recuerdo" | Ricky Martin featuring La Mari and Tommy Torres | |
| 2009 (21st) | "¿Dónde Están Corazón?"‡ | Enrique Iglesias | |
| 2009 (21st) | "Ahora Entendí" | Yuridia | |
| 2009 (21st) | "Cada Que..." | Belanova | |
| 2009 (21st) | "Inalcanzable" | RBD | |
| 2009 (21st) | "Soy Sólo Un Secreto" | Alejandra Guzmán | |
| 2010 (22nd) | "Aquí Estoy Yo"‡ | Luis Fonsi featuring Aleks Syntek, David Bisbal and Noel Schajris | |
| 2010 (22nd) | "Así Fue" | Playa Limbo | |
| 2010 (22nd) | "Causa y Efecto" | Paulina Rubio | |
| 2010 (22nd) | "Como Duele" | Ricardo Arjona | |
| 2010 (22nd) | "Que te Quería" | La 5ª Estación | |
| 2011 (23rd) | "Mientes"‡ | Camila | |
| 2011 (23rd) | "Cuando Me Enamoro" | Enrique Iglesias featuring Juan Luis Guerra | |
| 2011 (23rd) | "Lo Hecho Está Hecho" | Shakira | |
| 2011 (23rd) | "Me Enamoré de Ti" | Chayanne | |
| 2011 (23rd) | "Se Me Va la Voz" | Alejandro Fernández | |
| 2012 (24th) | "Rabiosa"‡ | Shakira featuring El Cata | |
| 2012 (24th) | "Lo Mejor De Mi Vida Eres Tu" | Ricky Martin featuring Natalia Jiménez | |
| 2012 (24th) | "Me Río de Ti" | Gloria Trevi | |
| 2012 (24th) | "Peligro" | Reik | |
| 2012 (24th) | "Sale el Sol" | Shakira | |
| 2013 (25th) | "A Cambio de Qué"‡ | Jenni Rivera | |
| 2013 (25th) | "¡Corre!" | Jesse & Joy | |
| 2013 (25th) | "Fuiste Tu" | Ricardo Arjona featuring Gaby Moreno | |
| 2013 (25th) | "Me Gustas Tanto" | Paulina Rubio | |
| 2013 (25th) | "Un Hombre Normal" | Espinoza Paz | |
| 2014 (26th) | "Detrás de Mi Ventana"‡ | Jenni Rivera | |
| 2014 (26th) | "Llorar" | Jesse & Joy featuring Mario Domm | |
| 2014 (26th) | "Mi Marciana" | Alejandro Sanz | |
| 2014 (26th) | "No Me Compares" | Alejandro Sanz | |
| 2014 (26th) | "Te Perdiste Mi Amor" | Thalía featuring Prince Royce | |
| 2015 (27th) | "Bailando"‡ | Enrique Iglesias featuring Gente de Zona and Descemer Bueno | |
| 2015 (27th) | "Decidiste Dejarme" | Camila | |
| 2015 (27th) | "El Perdedor" | Enrique Iglesias featuring Marco Antonio Solís | |
| 2015 (27th) | "La Noche es Tuya" | 3BallMTY featuring América Sierra and Gerardo Ortíz | |
| 2015 (27th) | "Tres Semanas" | Marco Antonio Solís | |
| 2016 (28th) | "Disparo al Corazón"‡ | Ricky Martin | |
| 2016 (28th) | "Lo Poco Que Tengo" | Ricardo Arjona | |
| 2016 (28th) | "Llegaste Tu" | Luis Fonsi and Juan Luis Guerra | |
| 2016 (28th) | "Juntos (Together)" | Juanes | |
| 2016 (28th) | "Mi Verdad" | Maná featuring Shakira | |
| 2017 (29th) | "Tan Fácil"‡ | CNCO | |
| 2017 (29th) | "Duele El Corazón" | Enrique Iglesias featuring Wisin | |
| 2017 (29th) | "No Soy Un de Esas" | Jesse & Joy featuring Alejandro Sanz | |
| 2017 (29th) | "Ironía" | Maná | |
| 2017 (29th) | "Solo Yo" | Sofía Reyes featuring Prince Royce | |
| 2017 (29th) | "Ya Me Enteré" | Reik featuring Nicky Jam | |
| 2019 (31st) | "Me Niego" | Reik featuring Ozuna and Wisin | |
| 2019 (31st) | "El Préstamo" | Maluma | |
| 2019 (31st) | "Fiebre" | Ricky Martin featuring Wisin & Yandel | |
| 2019 (31st) | "No Te Vas" | Nacho | |
| 2019 (31st) | "La Vida Sin Ti" | Piso 21 | |

== See also ==
- Billboard Latin Music Award for Latin Pop Song of the Year
- Latin Grammy Award for Best Pop Song
