= Endre Granat =

Hungarian-born American violinist (born 1937)

- Born: August 3, 1937 (age 88)
- Genres: Classical music, film soundtracks
- Occupation: Musician
- Instrument: Violin

Endre Granat (born in Hungary in August 3, 1937) is an American violinist. He is regarded as the most recorded violinist and concertmaster working in the studios today.

== Early life and education ==
Granat studied at the Franz Liszt Academy in Budapest, Jacobs School of Music at Indiana University Bloomington and the Thornton School of Music at the University of Southern California. Granat is a former Fulbright Scholar.

His teachers included Gyorgy Garay, Josef Gingold and Jascha Heifetz.

In 1962 Endre Granat won first prize at the International Competition in Heidelberg and he was a 1967 prize winner of the Queen Elizabeth International Competition in Brussels. He performs on an Italian "Domenicus Montagnana" 1721 violin.

== Career ==
Granat is a former assistant concertmaster of the Cleveland Orchestra, concertmaster of the Goteborg Symphony Orchestra, and concertmaster of the Pacific Symphony. He is a laureate of the Queen Elisabeth Music Competition and a recipient of the Ysaye Medal. Granat has been a frequent participant of the Marlboro Music Festival and the Casals Festival.

A former Fulbright scholar, he has taught at the Royal Conservatory of Music in Goteborg, the Cleveland Institute of Music, California State University at Northridge, and the University of Southern California.

Granat is noted for his Urtext editions of violin concerti by Johannes Brahms, Felix Mendelssohn and Henryk Wieniawski as well as The Essential Sevcik. Granat is editor for the Heifetz Collection that include urtext editions of Heifetz' favorites as well as the Urtext Edition of Paganini 24 Caprices and THE HEIFETZ SCALE BOOK.

For many years one of the leading concertmaster for the Hollywood film industry, he was the leader for Miklos Rozsa, Elmer Bernstein, Jerry Goldsmith, John Williams, James Newton Howard, Henry Mancini, Hans Zimmer and a host of others. Granat was the concertmaster of numerous awards ceremonies of the Academy Awards, the Emmy Awards and the Grammy Awards. He has over 2,800 motion pictures and thousands of television shows to his credit.

Granat has toured and recorded with numerous artists, including Earth, Wind, and Fire, Michael Jackson, Lionel Richie, Barbra Streisand, Yanni, Natalie Cole, Dionne Warwick, and Ricky Martin.

He was concertmaster for many recording studios that made soundtracks for films, including Ghostbusters (1984), Homeward Bound II: Lost in San Francisco (1996), Starship Troopers (1996), Anna and the King (1999), Legally Blonde (2001), The Bourne Identity (2002), Star Trek: Nemesis (2002), Dreamcatcher (2003), Looney Tunes: Back in Action (2003), The Last Samurai (2003), Peter Pan (2003), The Terminal (2004), Transformers (2007), Pirates of the Caribbean: At World's End (2007), The Simpsons Movie (2007), and Frozen (2013).
