= Joel Derouin =

- Born: July 29, 1956 (age 69); Cornwall, Ontario, Canada
- Origin: Canadian
- Occupations: Concert master; composer; music director
- Instrument: Violin

Joel Derouin is a Canadian violinist, concert master, composer and music director. In addition to having worked with many popular musicians, he is also known for his work in film, television and theatre.

== Biography ==
Born in Cornwall, Ontario, Canada, on July 29, 1956, Derouin began violin lessons at the age of five. He soon became one of the first members of the Riverdale String Ensemble under Canadian violinist Rosemonde Laberge, winning music festivals across Canada. He studied at the Le Conservatoire de Musique du Quebec in Montreal from 1970 to 1975 and at The Juilliard School in New York City from 1975 to 1979.

In 1977, when he was 21 years old, he was invited to tour with Emerson, Lake and Palmer. Since then, he has toured with Eric Clapton, Sheryl Crow, Marvin Gaye, Stevie Nicks, Barbra Streisand and Rush.

Since the early 1980s, Derouin has worked with Christina Aguilera, Barenaked Ladies, Beck, Mary J. Blige, Michael Buble, Mariah Carey, Vanessa Carlton, Kelly Clarkson, Leonard Cohen, Dido, Aretha Franklin, Ben Harper, Avril Lavigne, Paul McCartney, LeAnn Rimes, Liz Phair, Shakira, Carrie Underwood, and Rufus Wainwright.

He has provided music for many animated movies and television shows, including Cars and Up; Planes; The Simpsons, American Dad! and Family Guy; and Warner Bros. cartoons. His other film credits include acting as concert master for Anchorman 2: The Legend Continues, Ted, Eragon, and Lemony Snicket's A Series of Unfortunate Events, and playing violin on motion picture soundtracks, much as Epic, Oblivion, Men in Black 3, and Watchmen.

He has played violin on Broadway, the Grammy Awards, the Academy Awards, MTV Unplugged, The Tonight Show, Saturday Night Live, Dancing with the Stars, The X Factor, America: A Tribute to Heroes, and spent six seasons as concert master for American Idol.

His writing credits include the score to the 1991 movie The Hitman starring Chuck Norris, and the track "Jane" on Stevie Nicks' 1994 Street Angel album.
