= 1992 in Latin music =

This is a list of notable events in Latin music (music from Spanish- and Portuguese-speaking areas from Latin America, Europe, and the United States) that took place in 1992.

== Events ==
- February 25 – The 34th Annual Grammy Awards are held at the Radio City Music Hall in New York City.
  - Vikki Carr wins the Grammy Award for Best Latin Pop Album for her album Cosas del Amor.
  - Juan Luis Guerra wins the Grammy Award for Best Tropical Latin Album for his album Bachata Rosa
  - Little Joe wins the Grammy Award for Best Mexican-American Album for his album 16 de Septiembre.
- May 14 – The 4th Annual Lo Nuestro Awards are held at the James L. Knight Center in Miami, Florida. Mexican singer Ana Gabriel is the most awarded artist with four wins.

== Bands formed ==
- Cristian Castro (Latin pop singer)
- Paulina Rubio (Latin pop singer)
- Jon Secada
- Bachata Magic
- Alejandro Fernández
- Banda Vallarta Show
- Rey Ruiz
- Caña Brava
- Olga Tañón
- Zona Roja

== Number-ones albums and singles by country ==
- List of number-one albums of 1992 (Spain)
- List of number-one singles of 1992 (Spain)
- List of number-one Billboard Top Latin Albums of 1992
- List of number-one Billboard Hot Latin Tracks of 1992

== Awards ==
- 1992 Premio Lo Nuestro
- 1992 Tejano Music Awards

== Albums released ==
=== First quarter ===
==== January ====
Day	Title	Artist	Genre(s)	Singles	Label
24	The Mambo Kings	Various artists			
30	El Niño de Oro	Cano Estremera	Salsa, Guaguanco		PDC, PDC
30	El Conjunto del Amor	Conjunto Chaney	Salsa		Hitt Makers Inc.

==== February ====
Day	Title	Artist	Genre(s)	Singles	Label
15	Imaginame	María Conchita Alonso	Ballad, AOR, Soft Rock, Pop rock		Sony Latin

==== March ====
Day	Title	Artist	Genre(s)	Singles	Label
20	Condename	Tito Rojas	Salsa		Musical Productions
24	The Voice is Back	David Marez	Tejano, Conjunto, Cumbia		Capitol/EMI Latin

=== Second quarter ===
==== April ====
Day	Title	Artist	Genre(s)	Singles	Label
28	Con Sentimiento y Sabor	Los Tigres del Norte	Corrido		FonoVisa

==== May ====
Day	Title	Artist	Genre(s)	Singles	Label
5	Jon Secada	Jon Secada	Soft Rock, Latin, Downtempo	"Just Another Day" "Do You Believe in Us" "I'm Free"	SBK Records
12	Ave Fénix	Raphael	Ballad		Sony Discos

==== June ====
Day	Title	Artist	Genre(s)	Singles	Label
1	Buena Pesca	Orquesta La Solución	Salsa, Guaguanco		TH-Rodven
23	La Roka	Rokabanda	Salsa, Merengue		J&N Records

=== Third quarter ===
==== July ====
Day	Title	Artist	Genre(s)	Singles	Label
Unknown Day	Me Siento Tan Sola	Gloria Trevi	Alternative Rock		Ariola
Unknown Day	El Silencio	Caifanes	Alternative Rock		RCA, BMG
Unknown Day	Fisica y Quimica	Joaquín Sabina	Vocal		Ariola

==== August ====
Day	Title	Artist	Genre(s)	Singles	Label
7	Misa Negra	Irakere	Afro-Cuban		Timba Records
10	Capullo y Sorullo	Johnny Ventura	Salsa, Merengue	"Capullo y Sorullo"	Combo Records
10	The Music Makers	Bonny Cepeda	Merengue, Salsa		Combo Records
25	Frenesí	Linda Ronstadt	Bolero	"Frenesi" "Entre Abismos" "Cuando Me Querias Tu"	Elektra, Elektra

==== September ====
Day	Title	Artist	Genre(s)	Singles	Label
8	Llegó La India Via Eddie Palmieri	La India	Acid Jazz, Latin		Soho Sounds, Sony

=== Fourth quarter ===
==== October ====
Day	Title	Artist	Genre(s)	Singles	Label
6	Otro Día Más Sin Verte	Jon Secada	Latin, Ballad, RnB/Swing		Captiol/EMI Latin, Captiol/EMI Latin, SBK Records, SBK Records
7	Love	Thalía	Pop rock, Disco, Ballad		Fonovisa
27	No Me Faltes Nunca	Caña Brava	Merengue		Platano Records

==== November ====
Day	Title	Artist	Genre(s)	Singles	Label
13	Mexicanismo	Gerardo Reyes			
24	El Arrollador	Pochy y su Cocoband			
Unknown Day	Los Hijos del Sol	Ricardo Montaner	Ballad, Vocal		Rodven
Unknown Day	Miami Band	Miami Band	Salsa, Merengue, Boogaloo		TH-Rodven

==== December ====
Day	Title	Artist	Genre(s)	Singles	Label
30	Irresistible	Ray Barretto	Afro-Cuban Jazz, Salsa		Fania Records
30	Tribute a Ismael Miranda	Celia Cruz			

=== Unknown date ===
Title	Artist	Genre(s)	Singles	Label
Para Mi Pueblo	Fernando Villalona	Merengue		Kubaney
Beyond	Mazz	Tejano, Conjunto		CBS
Sueño Contigo	José Alberto "El Canario"	Salsa		RMM Records
Mis Amores	José Alberto "El Canario"	Salsa		RMM Records
En el Palacio de Bellas Artes	Juan Gabriel	Ballad, Ranchera		Ariola
Piel Canela	Angela Carrasco	Ballad		Capitol/EMI Latin
Piel de Hombre	José Luis Rodríguez "El Puma"	Ballad, Chanson		Sony Discos
Quiéreme	Los Bukis	Bolero, Cumbia		FonoVisa
De Vuelta en la Trampa	Lalo Rodríguez	Bolero, Salsa		Capitol/EMI Latin
Solo Para Ti	Ottmar Liebert	New Age, Flamenco, Contemporary Jazz		Epic, Epic
Ilegal	Pandora	Soft Rock, Power Pop, Ballad		EMI Latin, Capitol Records
I Love My Freedom, I Love Texas	Mingo Saldivary y sus Tremendos			
Calor	Julio Iglesias	Ballad, Vocal, Bolero		Sony Discos, Sony
Entre a Mi Mundo	Selena	Tejano, Cumbia, Latin Pop	"Como la Flor" "¿Qué Creias?" "La Carcacha"	Capitol/EMI Latin
Sola	Olga Tañón	Merengue	"Besame Agresivamente" "Me Cambio Por Ella" "Una Mujer Rota"	WEA Latina
Nieves de Enero	Chalino Sánchez	Norteno, Ranchera, Corrido		Musart Super
Alejandro Fernández	Alejandro Fernández		"Todo Terminó" "Equivocadamente" "Necesito Olvidarla"	Sony Records
María Bonita	Mijares	Bolero, Ballad		Capitol/EMI Latin, Capitol/EMI Latin
Cuenta Conmigo	Jerry Rivera	Salsa, Bolero	"Casi un Hechizo" "Amores Como el Nuestro" "Cuenta Conmigo"	Sony Discos Inc.
Que de Raro Tiene	Vicente Fernández	Ranchera		Sony, Discos International
Agua Nueva	Cristian Castro	Vocal		Fonovisa, Inc.
Silueta	Ana Gabriel	Bolero, Ranchera		Sony Discos, Sony
De Otro Planeta	H2O			Sony Discos
El Rey de los Soneros	Oscar D'León	Sonero, Salsa, Afro-Cuban	"Me Voy Pa' Cali" "La Carta"	Sonero Records
Partners	Flaco Jiménez	Conjunto, Country Rock, Norteno	"Change Partners" "Carmelita" "Across the Borderline"	Reprise Records
Provócame	Chayanne			Sony Discos
Duro a la Baila	Tropicalísimo Apache			Mercury, Mercury
Amor y Control	Rubén Blades	Salsa		Sony, Discos International
Live	Gipsy Kings	Flamenco		Elektra Musician, Elektra Musician
El León	Los Fabulosos Cadillacs	Ska, Dub, Batucada		Sony, Discos International
América & En Vivo	Luis Miguel			WEA Latina
Regalame Esta Noche	Alex d'Castro	Salsa	"Y Me Pregunto"	TH-Rodven, TH-Rodven
A Dos Tiempos de un Tiempo	Gilberto Santa Rosa	Salsa		Sony Discos
La Chica Dorada	Paulina Rubio	New Jack Swing		Capitol/EMI Latin
Latin Street '92	José Feliciano			Capitol/EMI Latin
Ahora y Siempre	La Mafia	Tejano		Sony Discos
Hangin' on by a Thread	Texas Tornados		"Guacamole" "To Ramona" "Adios Mi Corazon"	Reprise Records
Homenaje a Mexico	Álvaro Torres	Ballad		EMI
Adivina	Sergio Dalma	Vocal, Ballad		TH-Rodven
Areíto	Juan Luis Guerra	Merengue, Bachata, Ballad		Karen Records, BMG, BMG
Mi Libertad	Frankie Ruiz	Salsa	"Mi Libertad" "Otra Vez" "Bailando"	TH-Rodven
Rey Ruiz	Rey Ruiz	Salsa		Sony, Discos International
15 Años Después...	El Reencuentro	Pop rock, Ballad		Fonovisa

== Best-selling records ==
=== Best-selling albums ===
The following is a list of the top 5 best-selling Latin albums of 1992 in the United States in the categories of Latin pop, Regional Mexican, and Tropical/salsa, according to Billboard.

Category	Rank	Album	Artist
Latin pop	1	Romance	Luis Miguel
Latin pop	2	Magneto	Magneto
Latin pop	3	Con Amor Eterno...	Pandora
Latin pop	4	Nada Se Compara Contigo	Álvaro Torres
Latin pop	5	En el Último Lugar del Mundo	Ricardo Montaner
Regional Mexican	1	Estas Tocando Fuego	La Mafia
Regional Mexican	2	Mi México	Ana Gabriel
Regional Mexican	3	Salvaje y Tierno	Bronco
Regional Mexican	4	Mazz Live-Una Noche Juntos	Mazz
Regional Mexican	5	Mi Vida Eres Tú	Los Temerarios
Tropical/Salsa	1	Perspectiva	Gilberto Santa Rosa
Tropical/Salsa	2	Soy el Mismo	Eddie Santiago
Tropical/Salsa	3	Tito Rojas	Tito Rojas
Tropical/Salsa	4	Cuenta Conmigo	Jerry Rivera
Tropical/Salsa	5	Uno Mismo	Tony Vega

=== Best-performing songs ===
The following is a list of the top 10 best-performing Latin songs in the United States in 1992, according to Billboard.

Rank	Single	Artist
1	"Evidencias"	Ana Gabriel
2	"No Sé Tú"	Luis Miguel
3	"Inolvidable"	Luis Miguel
4	"Otro Día Más Sin Verte"	Jon Secada
5	"Mi Mayor Necesidad"	Los Bukis
6	"Amor Mío, ¿Qué Me Has Hecho?"	Camilo Sesto
7	"Si Piensas, Si Quieres"	Roberto Carlos and Rocío Dúrcal
8	"El Centro de Mi Corazón"	Chayanne
9	"Angel"	Jon Secada
10	"Torero"	José Luis Rodríguez "El Puma" and Julio Iglesias

== Births ==
- February 26 – Danilo Mesquita, Brazilian actor, singer and composer
- March 13 – Ozuna, Puerto Rican reggaeton and trap singer
- July 8 – Ariel Camacho, Founder and lead singer of Los Plebes del Rancho de Ariel Camacho (d. 2015)
- July 10 – Nego do Borel, Brazilian funk ostentação singer
- July 27 – El Dasa, Mexican banda singer
- August 19 – Feid Colombian urbano singer
- September 16 – Guaynaa, Puerto Rican reggaeton singer
- September 25 – Rosalía, Spanish pop singer
- October 30 – Greeicy, Colombian singer
- November 26 – Anuel AA, Puerto Rican trap artist

== Deaths ==
- February 5 – Nicomedes Santa Cruz, Afro-Peruvian musician
- February 29 – La Lupe, Cuban singer
- March 18 – Antonio Molina, Spanish flamenco singer
- May 16 - Chalino Sanchez, Mexican corrido singer
- May 23 – Atahualpa Yupanqui, Argentine trova singer
- May 31 – Iosu Expósito, Spanish rock musician
- June 11 – Rafael Orozco Maestre, Colombian vallenato singer
- July 2 – Camarón de la Isla, Spanish flamenco singer
- July 4 – Ástor Piazzolla, Argentine tango composer
- October 9 – Juanma Suárez, Spanish rock singer
- November 27 – Daniel Santos, Puerto Rican bolero singer
