= Otro Día Más Sin Verte =

Studio album by Jon Secada
- Released: October 6, 1992
- Recorded: 1992
- Genres: R&B; Latin; pop rock
- Length: 43:04
- Language: Spanish
- Label: EMI Latin
- Producers: Jorge Casas; Emilio Estefan; Clay Ostwald

Jon Secada chronology
Jon Secada (1992)	Otro Día Más Sin Verte (1992)	Heart, Soul & a Voice (1994)

Singles from Otro Día Más Sin Verte
- 1. "Otro Día Más Sin Verte" Released: 1992; 2. "Angel" Released: 1993; 3. "Cree En Nuestro Amor" Released: August 15, 1993; 4. "Sentir" Released: 1993; 5. "Tiempo Al Tiempo" Released: 1993

Sentir
- Spain edition

Otro Día Más Sin Verte (English: Another Day Without Seeing You), also called Sentir (English: Feel) in Spain, is the Spanish-language debut album by Cuban singer Jon Secada. It was released on October 6, 1992, by EMI Latin to complement his English-language self-titled debut album, which was released in April 1992. The idea to release an all Spanish-language album was pitched by Secada's music mentor Emilio Estefan, after realizing that SBK Records had yet released such an album. Estefan presented Secada's proposal for a Spanish-language recording to the head of SBK, Charles Koppelman and then president of EMI Latin Jose Behar. Koppelman accepted the proposal after Behar stated that he could see market potential for Secada. With the help of Emilio's wife, Gloria Estefan, Secada translated selected compositions from his English-language debut album for Otro Día Más Sin Verte.

The album spawned five singles; its title track, "Angel", "Cree En Nuestro Amor", "Sentir", and "Tiempo Al Tiempo". The first four singles peaked at number one on the US Billboard Hot Latin Tracks chart, becoming the first Latin artist to do so. Secada held the record for most number ones from a single album, until Spanish Latin pop singer Enrique Iglesias broke the record in 1997. Secada became the first Hispanic artist of color to have a number one song on the Hot Latin Tracks chart. The album peaked at number four on the US Billboard Latin Pop Albums chart and number eight on the US Billboard Top Latin Albums chart. Otro Día Más Sin Verte helped Secada to win Male Artist of the Year and New Artist of the Year at the 1993 Premio Lo Nuestro Awards. The album won the Grammy Award for Best Latin Pop Album in 1993.

== Production ==
Jon Secada was a backup vocalist for Cuban singer Gloria Estefan in 1989. He became close friends with Gloria and her husband, Emilio Estefan who helped guide Secada into the music business. Secada released his self-titled debut album in 1992 with SBK Records. The recording was made up of English-language compositions and two Spanish-language tracks. It was certified triple platinum by the Recording Industry Association of America (RIAA), denoting shipments of three million copies. His popularity as a singer grew with the release of his debut album. While on tour for the album, Secada remarked on how Emilio began coining the idea of releasing a full-length Spanish-language recording. Emilio had the idea after realizing that SBK Records never released a Spanish-language album. According to Secada, writing in his autobiography, Emilio pitched his ideas to EMI Latin, a subsidiary of Capitol EMI Records. Secada explained that Emilio went "full throttle" and wanted Secada to be a crossover artist with "major international appeal."

After Secada's debut album was a commercial success, Emilio met the executives at EMI Records. Emilio explained to the executives about Secada's background and that an album in Spanish by Secada wouldn't cost them anything because "he can do it himself." Jose Behar, then-president of EMI Latin, told Emilio that he quickly "recognized the market potential" for Secada. Behar suggested to the head of EMI Records, Charles Koppelman, that Secada should record his first Spanish-language album; Koppelman accepted the proposal.

During the recording sessions, Secada confirmed that Gloria helped translate his English-language recordings into Spanish. He said that she told him to record songs that he would be comfortable with singing throughout his career as a singer. She later told Secada and Emilio to not "translate everything literally" but to "keep the same theme of the song in play." Secada wrote in his autobiography that he was "grateful" that he and Gloria grew up in Miami, and spoke two languages. Secada said that recording in Spanish was "instinctively more passionate" when compared to his recordings in English, he also explained that it gave him "a different connection to the music as well." However, Chris Morris of Billboard, said that Secada lacked the emotional range that was present in his English-language debut album. Two of the songs "Angel" and the title track were originally on the English-language album as Spanish tracks. Four of the songs, including "Como En Un Sueño", "Tu Amor Es Mi Libertad", "Cree En Nuestro Amor", and "Sentir", were translated into Spanish from Secada's debut album.

== Release and singles ==
Once translation of the selected recordings were complete, Secada recorded them and released the album six months after his debut album Jon Secada was released on October 6, 1992. Otro Día Más Sin Verte peaked at number four on the US Billboard Latin Pop Albums chart in 1992 and number eight on the US Billboard Top Latin Albums chart the following year. The album's lead single "Otro Dia Mas Sin Verte" peaked at number one on the US Billboard Hot Latin Tracks on the week ending July 4, 1992. The second single released from the album, "Angel", peaked at number one on the US Billboard Hot Latin Tracks chart on the week ending October 31, 1992. "Angel" was written about a woman Secada met in Amsterdam. He wrote in his autobiography that "writing those songs crystallized for me the fact that I was missing out on a deep emotional connection." John Lannert of Billboard called "Angel" a "dramatic love ode", the song remained atop the Hot Latin Tracks chart for two consecutive weeks. "Cree En Nuestro Amor", released as the third single from the album on August 15, 1992, also peaked at number one on the US Billboard Hot Latin Tracks on February 27, 1993.

The fourth single released from the recording, "Sentir", peaked at number one on the US Billboard Hot Latin Tracks chart on the week ending July 3, 1993. By placing four singles atop the Hot Latin Tracks chart, Secada became the first Latin artist to accomplish this feat. Spanish Latin pop singer Enrique Iglesias broke Secada's record with five number one singles from his self-titled album in 1997. When the album's lead single "Otro Día Más Sin Verte" peaked at number one on the Billboard Hot Latin Tracks chart, Secada became the first Hispanic artist of color to do so. Secada released his fifth single from his album, "Tiempo Al Tiempo", debuted at number 33 on the US Billboard Hot Latin Tracks chart on the week ending August 14, 1993, it later peaked at number nine. Otro Día Más Sin Verte was re-released digitally on March 3, 2003. It was re-released on compact disc on July 19, 2005.

== Legacy and reception ==
Professional ratings
Review scores
Source	Rating
AllMusic	3/5 stars

Cordelia Candelaria wrote in her book Encyclopedia of Latino Popular Culture (2004) that Otro Día Más Sin Verte helped Secada "[infiltrate] the Latin music culture". Carlos Bolívar Ramírez called the singles "Otro Día Más Sin Verte" and "Angel" rock ballads in his book La balada: mensaje universal (2001). The album was a commercial success in Spain where Secada was named "Best Adult Contemporary Artist of the early 1990s" by Humberto López Morales in his book El español en el mundo: Anuario del Instituto Cervantes (2008). Chuck Taylor of Billboard called Secada's new Spanish offerings as having a "tailored, uptempo Latin vibe." Taylor called Secada's transition from recording songs in English to Spanish as "positioning [Secada] as more of a romantic Latin idol than his mainstream American image as a passionate pop singer."

Otro Día Más Sin Verte was a commercial and critical success. The album won Best Latin Pop Album at the 35th Grammy Awards in 1993. The titular single became the fourth best-performing song of 1992. Secada was nominated for Top New Artist, Top Male Artist, and Best Director at the 1992 Billboard Music Awards. He also won BMI's Latin Song of the Year for the title track. The title track became the first song by a Latin artist to peak within the top five of the Hot 100, Hot Adult Contemporary, and the Hot Latin Tracks chart simultaneously, since Gloria's 1989 single "Don't Wanna Lose You"/"Si Voy a Perderte".

Secada became the first Cuban-born recording artist to place a single atop the Billboard Hot Latin Tracks since Franco's 1988 single "María". Otro Día Más Sin Verte led Secada a nomination at the American Society of Composers, Authors and Publishers (ASCAP) Awards for Songwriter of the Year (for "Cree En Nuestro Amor") and Latin Pop Songs of the year (for "Sentir") in 1993. The album led Secada to win Male Artist of the Year and New Artist of the Year at the 1993 Lo Nuestro Awards. The recording's single, "Angel", was nominated for Pop Song of the Year, while the title track was nominated for Video of the Year at the same event. The album itself was nominated Pop Album of the Year at the 1994 Lo Nuestro Awards, but lost to Aries by Luis Miguel.

== Track listing ==
No.	Title	Writer(s)	Length
1.	"Otro Día Más Sin Verte"	Gloria Estefan; Miguel Morejon; Jon Secada	5:25
2.	"Como En Un Sueño"	Morejon; Secada; Joseph Stefano	4:46
3.	"Tu Mejor Amigo"	Secada	3:26
4.	"Cree En Nuestro Amor"	Morejon; Secada; Stefano	3:58
5.	"Tu Amor Es Mi Libertad"	Secada; Stefano	4:02
6.	"Angel"	Estefan; Stefano; Secada	4:35
7.	"Enseñame"	Willy Pérez Feria; Secada	5:06
8.	"Tiempo Al Tiempo"	Pérez Feria; Secada; Stefano	4:24
9.	"Sentir"	Morejon; Secada; Stefano	4:01
10.	"Perdoname Conciencia"	María Teresa Vera	3:21

== Personnel ==
Credits are taken from the album's liner notes.

- Jon Secada – vocals, composer, producer
- Jorge Casas – music producer
- Emilio Estefan Jr. – producer
- Clay Ostwald – producer
- Gloria Estefan – composer
- Willy Pérez Feria – composer
- Miguel Morejon – composer
- Joseph Stefano – composer
- Maria Teresa Vera – composer
- Henry Marquez – cover designer, graphic designer
- Carla Leighton – designer

== Charts ==
=== Weekly charts ===
Chart (1992)	Peak position
US Latin Pop Albums (Billboard)	4
Chart (1993)	Peak position
US Top Latin Albums (Billboard)	8

=== Year-end charts ===
Chart (1993)	Peak position
US Billboard Latin Pop Albums	7
Chart (1994)	Peak position
US Billboard Top Latin Albums	38

== See also ==
- 1992 in Latin music
