= Sentir =

Single by Jon Secada

from the album Jon Secada and Otro Día Más Sin Verte
- Released: 1993
- Recorded: 1992
- Genre: Latin pop
- Length: 4:01
- Label: EMI Latin
- Songwriters: Miguel Morejon; Joseph Stefano; Jon Secada
- Producer: Emilio Estefan Jr.

Jon Secada singles chronology
"Cree En Nuestro Amor" (1993)	"Sentir" (1993)	"Tiempo Al Tiempo" (1993)

"Sentir" is a song recorded by Cuban recording artist Jon Secada for his debut self-titled studio album and for his debut Spanish-language album Otro Día Más Sin Verte (1992). It was released in 1993 as the fourth single from his Spanish-language album. The Spanish version peaked at number one on the US Billboard Hot Latin Tracks chart, making Secada the first Hispanic artist to do so. It was composed by Secada, Miguel Morejon, and Joseph Stefano, while Emilio Estefan Jr. produced the piece.

== Production and success ==
Jon Secada was the backup vocalist for Cuban singer Gloria Estefan in 1989. Secada became close friends with Gloria and her husband, Emilio Estefan Jr., who helped guide Secada into the music business. Secada released his self-titled debut album in 1992 with SBK Records. The recording made up of English-language compositions and two Spanish-language tracks. It was certified triple platinum by the Recording Industry Association of America (RIAA), denoting shipments of three million copies. Secada, with the help from Emilio, decided to release an all Spanish-language album. During the recording sessions, Secada confirmed that Gloria helped translate his English-language recordings into Spanish. He said that she told him to record songs that he would be comfortably fine with singing throughout his career as a singer. She also told them not to "translate everything literally" but to "keep the same theme of the song in play."

"Sentir" was released as the fourth single from his Spanish album. It peaked at number one on the US Billboard Hot Latin Tracks chart ending on July 3, 1993. Secada became the first Latin artist to place four number one singles from a single album on the US Billboard Hot Latin Tracks chart. Spanish Latin pop singer Enrique Iglesias broke Secada's record with five number one singles from his self-titled album in 1997. "Sentir" was the seventh best-performing Latin single on the Hot Latin Tracks year-end chart in 1993.

== Chart performance ==
=== Weekly charts ===
Chart (1993)	Peak position
US Billboard Hot Latin Songs	1

=== Year-end charts ===
Chart (1993)	Peak position
US Billboard Hot Latin Songs	7

== Credits and personnel ==
Credits are taken from the album's liner notes.

- Jon Secada — vocals, composer
- Miguel Morejon — composer
- Joseph Stefano — composer
- Emilio Estefan Jr. — producer
