= List of number-one albums of 1992 (Spain) =

The List of number-one albums of 1992 in Spain is derived from the Top 100 España record chart published weekly by PROMUSICAE (Productores de Música de España), a non-profit organization composed by Spain and multinational record companies. This association tracks record sales (physical and digital) in Spain.

== Albums ==
Week	Chart Date	Album	Artist	Reference
1	January 6	Greatest Hits II	Queen	
2	January 13	Greatest Hits II	Queen	
3	January 20	Greatest Hits II	Queen	
4	January 27	Greatest Hits II	Queen	
5	February 3	Greatest Hits II	Queen	
6	February 10	Greatest Hits II	Queen	
7	February 17	Greatest Hits II	Queen	
8	February 24	Greatest Hits II	Queen	
9	March 2	Máquina Total Vol. 3	Various Artists	
10	March 9	Máquina Total Vol. 3	Various Artists	
11	March 16	Máquina Total Vol. 3	Various Artists	
12	March 23	Human Touch	Bruce Springsteen	
13	March 30	Human Touch	Bruce Springsteen	
14	April 6	Human Touch	Bruce Springsteen	
15	April 13	Human Touch	Bruce Springsteen	
16	April 20	Human Touch	Bruce Springsteen	
17	April 27	Adivina	Sergio Dalma	
18	May 4	Utopía	Joan Manuel Serrat	
19	May 11	Calor	Julio Iglesias	
20	May 18	Calor	Julio Iglesias	
21	May 25	Calor	Julio Iglesias	
22	June 1	Calor	Julio Iglesias	
23	June 8	Calor	Julio Iglesias	
24	June 15	Calor	Julio Iglesias	
25	June 22	Calor	Julio Iglesias	
26	June 29	Calor	Julio Iglesias	
27	July 6	Calor	Julio Iglesias	
28	July 13	Calor	Julio Iglesias	
29	July 20	Calor	Julio Iglesias	
30	July 27	Calor	Julio Iglesias	
31	August 3	Calor	Julio Iglesias	
32	August 10	Calor	Julio Iglesias	
33	August 17	Calor	Julio Iglesias	
34	August 24	Calor	Julio Iglesias	
35	August 31	Tubular Bells II	Mike Oldfield	
36	September 7	Tubular Bells II	Mike Oldfield	
37	September 14	Tubular Bells II	Mike Oldfield	
38	September 21	Tubular Bells II	Mike Oldfield	
39	September 28	Tubular Bells II	Mike Oldfield	
40	October 5	Tubular Bells II	Mike Oldfield	
41	October 12	Tubular Bells II	Mike Oldfield	
42	October 19	Tubular Bells II	Mike Oldfield	
43	October 26	Tubular Bells II	Mike Oldfield	
44	November 2	Jon Secada	Jon Secada	
45	November 9	Gold: Greatest Hits	ABBA	
46	November 16	Bandas Sonoras Originales	Varios Artistas	
47	November 23	Bolero Mix 9	Varios Artistas	
48	November 30	Bandas Sonoras Originales	Varios Artistas	
49	December 7	Bandas Sonoras Originales	Varios Artistas	
50	December 14	Boom 8	Varios Artistas	
51	December 21	Boom 8	Varios Artistas	
52	December 28	The Bodyguard: Original Soundtrack Album	Whitney Houston y Otros Interpretes	

== See also ==
- List of number-one singles of 1992 (Spain)
