= Tu Ultima Cancion =

Tu Última Canción

Studio album by Los Temerarios
- Released: October 1993
- Recorded: July–October 1993
- Genre: Romantic music, Latin music
- Label: Disa 1993; AFG Sigma Records 1994; Fonovisa 1996

Los Temerarios chronology
Mi Vida Eres Tu (1992)	Tu Última Canción (1993)	En Concierto, Vol. 1 (1994)

Tu Ultima Cancion (Your Last Song) is the 10th studio album released by the romantic ensemble Los Temerarios. All songs were composed by Adolfo Angel Alba, except where indicated.

== Track list ==
All songs were composed by Adolfo Angel Alba. But three songs is composed by Gustavo Angel Alba.

1. "Tu Última Canción" – 4:20
2. "Corazón de Otro" (Gustavo Angel Alba) – 3:36
3. "La Mujer Que Soñé" – 3:03
4. "Ahora Pienso Más En Ti" – 4:19
5. "Eres Un Sueño" – 4:00
6. "Una Tarde Fue" – 3:54
7. "Eres un Angel" – 4:39
8. "Enamorado de Ti" – 4:07
9. "Mi Secreto" – 4:42
10. "Voy a Quererte Más" (Gustavo Angel Alba) – 3:34
11. "Me Empiezo a Enamorar" (Gustavo Angel Alba) – 2:50

== Charts ==
Chart (1993–1994)	Peak position
US Top Latin Albums (Billboard)	5
US Regional Mexican Albums (Billboard)	2

== Sales and certifications ==
Region	Certification	Certified units/sales
United States (RIAA)	Diamond (Latin)	600,000^{‡}
^{‡} Sales+streaming figures based on certification alone.
