= Miami Band =

Venezuelan musical group

Miami Band was a merenrap group from Venezuela. They are known for the hit song "Ponte el Sombrero" which peaked at number 14 on the Billboard Hot Latin Songs chart. Their self-titled album peaked at number one on the Tropical Albums chart in the United States. They were nominated Rap Artist of the Year at the 5th Lo Nuestro Awards in 1993.
