= Premio Lo Nuestro 1993 =

Music award show in Miami, Florida

5th Lo Nuestro Awards
- Date: Thursday, May 20, 1993
- Site: James L. Knight Center; Miami, Florida, USA

Highlights
- Most awards: Jon Secada and Selena (3)
- Most nominations: Jon Secada (5)

The 5th Lo Nuestro Awards ceremony, presented by the Univision and Billboard magazine, honored the best Latin music of 1992 and 1993 and took place on May 20, 1993, at a live presentation held at the James L. Knight Center in Miami, Florida. The ceremony was broadcast in the United States and Latin America by Univision.

During the ceremony, twenty categories were presented. Winners were announced at the live event and included Cuban-American singer Jon Secada and Tejano performer Selena, each receiving three awards, and Juan Luis Guerra y 440, La Mafia and Jerry Rivera, each receiving two awards. Among its honors, Secada won the award for "Pop Album of the Year," La Mafia and Selena shared the award for "Regional Mexican Album of the Year," and Rivera won the award for "Tropical/Salsa Album of the Year." Mexican singer-songwriter Armando Manzanero received the Excellence Award.

== Background ==
In 1989, the Lo Nuestro Awards were established by Univision, to recognize the most talented performers of Latin music. The nominees were selected by Univision and Billboard magazine, and the winners chosen by the public. The categories included are for the Pop, Tropical/Salsa, Regional Mexican and Rap genres, and Music Video. The trophy awarded is shaped like a treble clef. The 5th Lo Nuestro Awards ceremony was held on May 20, 1993, in a live presentation held at the James L. Knight Center in Miami, Florida. The ceremony was broadcast in United States and Latin America by Univision.

== Nominees and winners ==
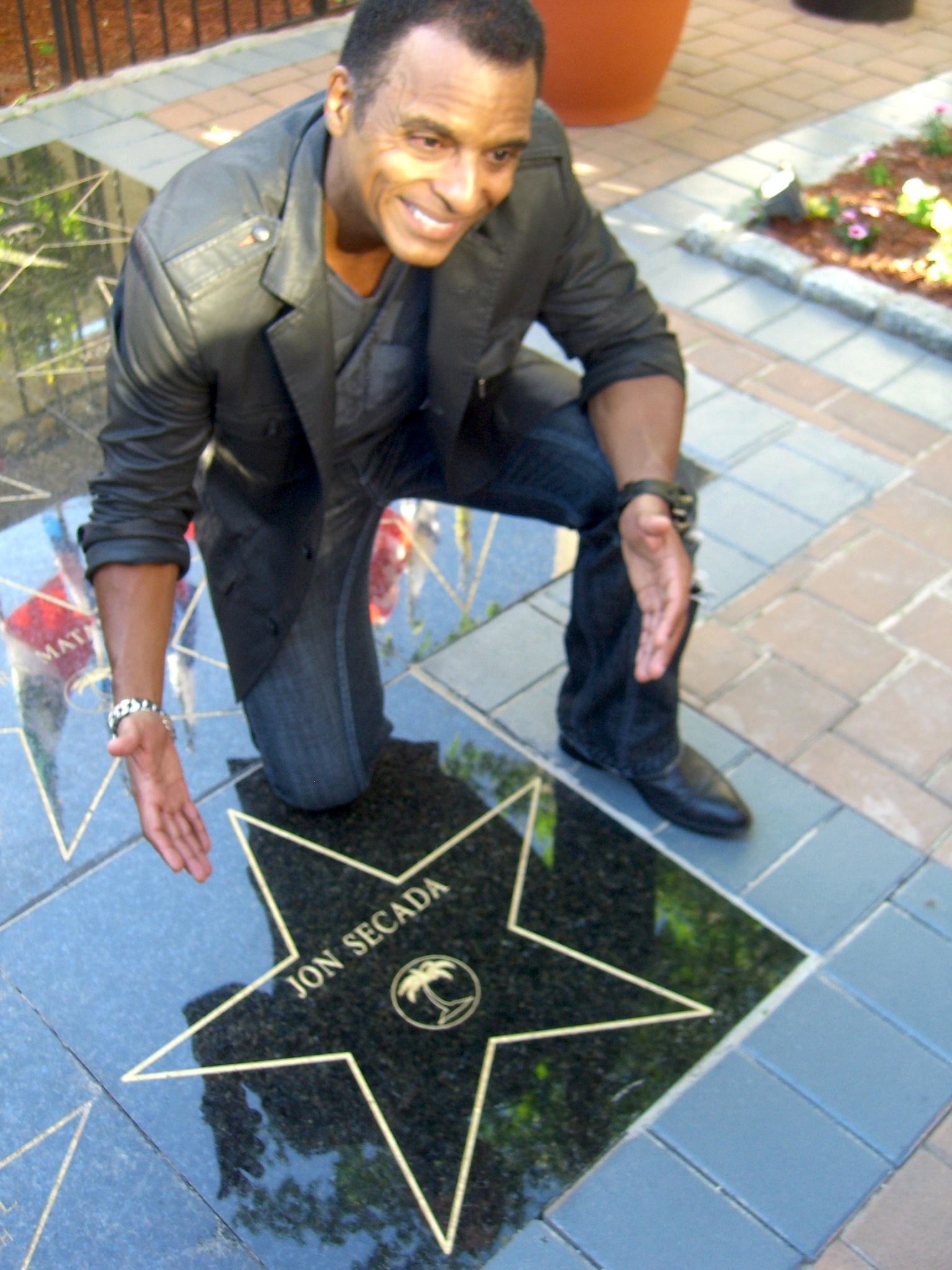
Jon Secada won the Grammy Award and three Lo Nuestro Awards in 1993.

Winners were announced before the live audience during the ceremony. Cuban singer Jon Secada was the most nominated performer, with five nominations, including Pop Album (Jon Secada), Male Artist, New Artist, Pop Song ("Angel"), and Video of the Year ("Otro Día Más Sin Verte"). Secada was awarded in the first three categories, with Mexican singer Luis Miguel winning for Pop Song for the single "No Sé Tú", and Spanish band Mecano receiving the accolade for Video of the Year for "Una Rosa es Una Rosa". All the songs nominated for Pop Song of the Year, Secada's "Angel", "El Centro de Mi Corazón" by Chayanne, "Castillo Azul" by Ricardo Montaner, "Evidencias" by Ana Gabriel, and Miguel's "No Sé Tú", reached number-one at the Billboard Top Latin Songs chart. Tejano performer Selena dominated the Regional Mexican field winning all her nominations, including Album of the Year (Entre a Mi Mundo), Regional Mexican Song ("Como La Flor") and Female Artist. Jerry Rivera and Juan Luis Guerra y 440 were awarded two prizes at the Tropical/Salsa field, Rivera for his album Cuenta Conmigo and Male Artist of the Year, and Guerra y 440 earning the awards for Song ("El Costo de la Vida") and Group of the Year.

Nominees and winners of the 5th Annual Lo Nuestro Awards (winners listed first)
Pop Album of the Year	Pop Song of the Year
Jon Secada – Jon Secada; Luis Miguel – Romance; Magneto – Magneto; Pandora – Ilegal; Álvaro Torres – Nada Se Compara Contigo	Luis Miguel – "No Sé Tú"; Chayanne – "El Centro de Mi Corazón"; Ana Gabriel – "Evidencias"; Ricardo Montaner – "Castillo Azul"; Jon Secada – "Angel"
Male Artist of the Year, Pop	Female Artist of the Year, Pop
Jon Secada; Chayanne; Luis Miguel; Ricardo Montaner	Ana Gabriel; Daniela Romo; Paulina Rubio; Gloria Trevi
Pop Group of the Year	New Pop Artist of the Year
Pandora; Los Bukis; H2O; Magneto	Jon Secada; Bachata Magic; Cristian; Paulina Rubio
Regional Mexican Album of the Year	Regional Mexican Song of the Year
La Mafia – Estas Tocando Fuego; Selena – Entre a Mi Mundo; Alejandro Fernández – Alejandro Fernández; Los Temerarios – Mi Vida Eres Tú; Vicente Fernández – Qué de Raro Tiene	Selena – "Como La Flor"; Bronco – "Adoro"; La Mafia – "Estás Tocando Fuego"; Los Temerarios – "Mi Vida Eres Tú"; Los Yonics – "Pero Te Vas a Arrepentir"
Male Artist of the Year, Regional Mexican	Female Artist of the Year, Regional Mexican
Vicente Fernández; Alejandro Fernández; Flaco Jiménez; Emilio Navaira	Selena; Ana Gabriel; Lucero; Linda Ronstadt
Regional Mexican Group of the Year	New Regional Mexican Artist of the Year
La Mafia; Bronco; Mazz; Los Temerarios	Banda Machos; Alejandro Fernández; Banda Vallarta Show; Zeus
Tropical/Salsa Album of the Year	Tropical/Salsa Song of the Year
Jerry Rivera – Cuenta Conmigo; Oscar D'León – El Rey de los Soneros; Tito Rojas – Tito Rojas; Gilberto Santa Rosa – Perspectiva; Olga Tañón – Sola	Juan Luis Guerra y 440 – "El Costo de la Vida"; Angela Carrasco – "Tu Amor Es Una Rueda"; Luis Enrique – "Lo Que Es Vivir"; Linda Ronstadt – "Perfidia"; Frankie Ruiz – "Bailando"
Male Artist of the Year, Tropical/Salsa	Female Artist of the Year, Tropical/Salsa
Jerry Rivera; Tito Rojas; Frankie Ruiz; Gilberto Santa Rosa	Angela Carrasco; India; Linda Ronstadt; Olga Tañón
Tropical/Salsa Group of the Year	New Tropical/Salsa Artist of the Year
Juan Luis Guerra y 440; Caña Brava; Los Sabrosos del Merengue; Zona Roja	Rey Ruiz; Caña Brava; Olga Tañón; Zona Roja
Rap Artist of the Year	Video of the Year
El General; Kid Power Posse; Miami Band; Ruben DJ	Mecano – "Una Rosa es Una Rosa"; Bronco – "El Sheriff de Chocolate"; Café Tacuba – "María"; Emmanuel – "Magdalena"; Juan Luis Guerra y 440 – "El Costo de la Vida"; La Mafia – "Me Estoy Enamorando"; Luis Miguel – "América, América"; Ricardo Montaner – "Castillo Azul"; Presuntos Implicados – "Llovió"; Jon Secada – "Otro Día Más Sin Verte"

== Honorary awards ==
- Excellence Award: Armando Manzanero.

== See also ==
- 1992 in Latin music
- 1993 in Latin music
- Grammy Award for Best Latin Pop Album
