= Just Another Day (Jon Secada song) =

1992 single by Jon Secada

Single by Jon Secada

from the album Jon Secada
- Released: March 16, 1992
- Studio: Crescent Moon
- Genre: Pop; soul
- Length: 5:27 (album version); 4:15 (edit)
- Label: SBK
- Songwriters: Jon Secada; Miguel A. Morejon
- Producer: Emilio Estefan, Jr.

Jon Secada singles chronology
| "Dias Como Hoy" (1989) | "Just Another Day" (1992) | "Do You Believe in Us" (1992) |

"Just Another Day" is a song by Cuban singer-songwriter Jon Secada recorded for his debut studio album, Jon Secada (1992). Secada and Miguel Morejon wrote the song, and SBK Records released it as the album's lead single in March 1992. The subject of this pop-soul-and-Latin-influenced ballad is the protagonist's deep desire to be with his lover and his inability to find happiness or contentment without them. Its music uses minor keys, piano melodies, and dramatic vocal performances, and a catchy hook serves as its foundation. Just Another Day combines a seductive, rhythmic cadence under Secada's baritenor vocal range that is enveloped by a simple song structure.

Critics gave a mixed response to Just Another Day: some critics lauded the song for being catchy and praised Secada's vocal delivery but others compared Secada to other artists and found his vocal performance too dramatic. The song's impact on radio, its emotional intensity, and its success in reaching diverse markets were acknowledged and celebrated by some critics. Kevin Layne directed the accompanying music video, which shows Secada using triumphant gestures and containing visual elements that mirror the musical progressions of music videos of the time. The video was nominated for Video of the Year at the 5th Annual Lo Nuestro Awards and Layne won Best Director at the 1993 Billboard Music Awards.

Just Another Day peaked at number five on the US Billboard Hot 100 and Adult Contemporary charts, and at number one on the Hot Latin Tracks chart, providing Secada the first number-one song of his career. It became the first song to simultaneously reach the top five of the Hot 100 and Adult Contemporary charts and, under the title Otro Día Más Sin Verte, the Hot Latin Tracks chart since Gloria Estefan's Don't Wanna Lose You in 1989. The Recording Industry Association of America (RIAA) certified it gold. Outside the US, Just Another Day peaked at number one in Sweden and in RPM's Adult Contemporary chart in Canada; it also reached the top ten in Austria, Czech Republic, Germany, Ireland, the Netherlands, New Zealand, Norway, Switzerland, and the UK. Otro Día Más Sin Verte helped Secada become an acclaimed singer-songwriter in the 1990s, gaining recognition in Latin America, Europe, and Mexico. It brought the singer international success, including extensive radio exposure in Mexico.

== Background and production ==
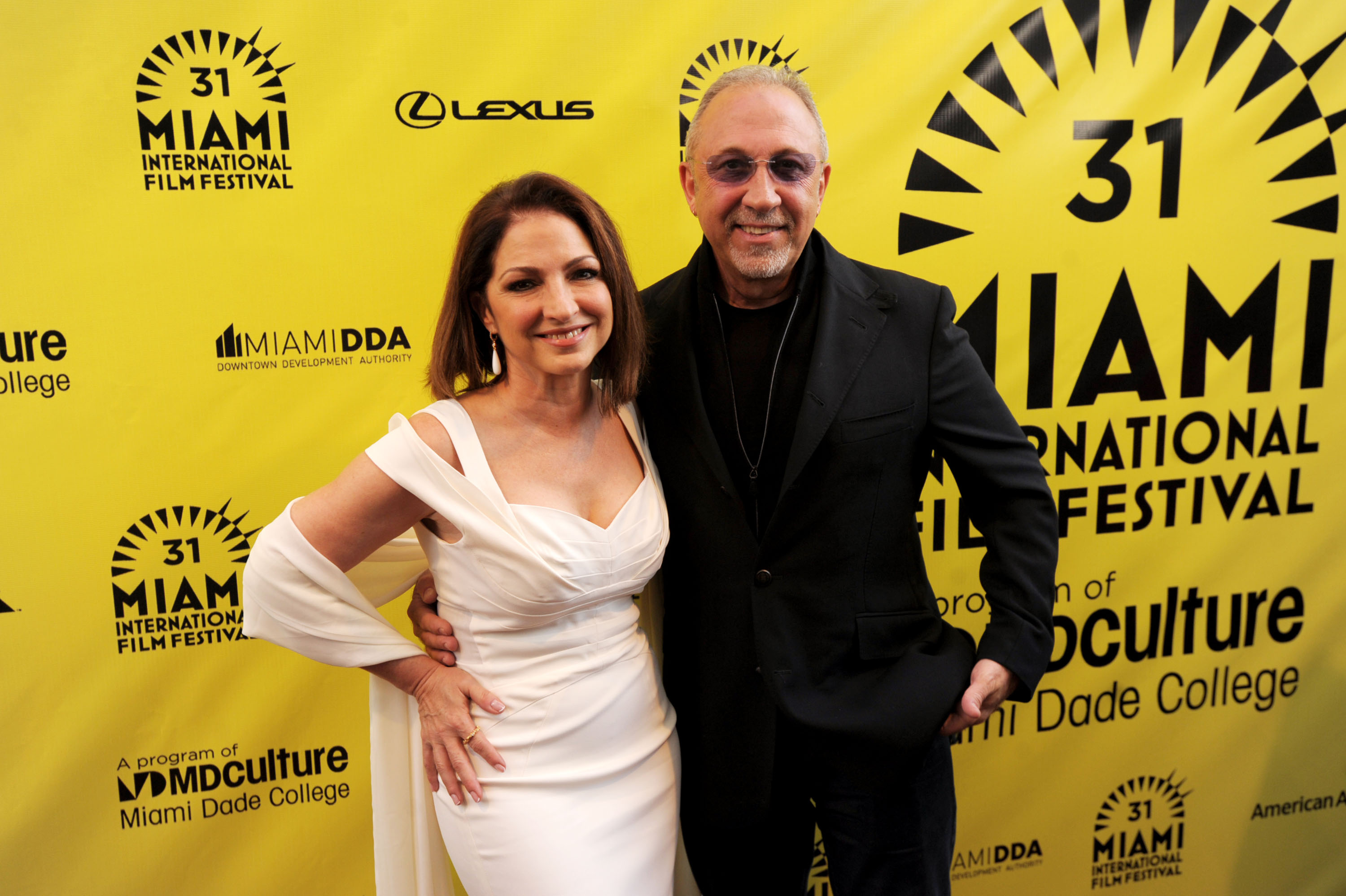
Emilio Estefan and Gloria Estefan (pictured together in 2014) assisted Jon Secada on Just Another Day and its Spanish counterpart, Otro Día Más Sin Verte.

Jon Secada discovered his passion for music while auditioning for his school's musical adaption of Charles Dickens' A Christmas Carol. He enjoyed the status it brought him because it began attracting friends. Secada attended the University of Miami, where he earned a master's degree in Jazz Vocal Performance. He worked as a backing singer for several artists, and composed songs for Japanese instrumentalists Takanaka and Seiko, Venezuelan singer Jose Luis "El Puma" Rodriguez, Mexican vocalist Luis Miguel, and Spanish singer Julio Iglesias. In 1987, Secada's former classmates Jorge Casas and Ray Ostwald gave music producer Emilio Estefan one of Secada's demo tapes. The tape evoked a range of emotions in Emilio and he believed Secada had a chance at success. In 1988, Secada released a Spanish-language album that highlighted his baritone voice and emotive delivery but was ignored. In 1989, he became a backup vocalist for Gloria Estefan and wrote "Say" for her album Cuts Both Ways (1989), and later composing six songs her album Into the Light (1991). Secada's compositions "Coming Out of the Dark" (1991) and "Can't Forget You" (1991) were released as singles and peaked at number one on the US Billboard Hot 100 chart. Secada provided backing vocals for Gloria during her world tour to promote Into the Light.

Secada aspired to become a soloist despite Emilio cautioning him it would require time. Emilio guided Secada in developing his songwriting and advised him on refining his abilities. Emilio encouraged Secada to compose his own music and cultivate a unique sound; Emilio also emphasized to Secada the importance of working on his appearance and enhancing it to the best of his abilities. Emilio provided a demo tape of Secada to SBK Records vice president of A&R Nancy Brennan and EMI Records chairman Charles Koppelman, both of whom enjoyed it. Brennan and Koppelman flew from New York City to London to see Secada perform at Wembley Stadium, where Gloria introduced him. After six hours of negotiations, at around 5 a.m., Secada signed a recording contract with the label. Koppelman expressed an interest in Secada flourishing as a singer who was capable of being a non-format artist. Emilio, finding few musical alternatives to rap and metal at the time, found Secada's timing as a soloist auspicious. He described Secada as a pop and R&B artist whom he believed represented a unique genre people were yearning for. Emilio became Secada's manager and producer.

Secada, who had concerns about a scarcity of original material, sensed an urgency to demonstrate record executives his artistic essence. He contacted Miguel Morejon and they secluded themselves in a period of intense emotional exhilaration, and wrote several songs. They considered "Just Another Day" the most exciting of these; the song was completed in 30 minutes and they both considered it as the album's title track. Secada felt Morejon played an important role in his artistic growth as a musician. Phil Ramone produced "Just Another Day" and "Angel", and Secada expressed his gratitude for having him produce both tracks. Secada believed "Just Another Day" is a testament to his emotional state during that period of his life, and that it represents a vibrant mixture of heartfelt sentiments. The song was recorded at Crescent Moon. Recognizing the market potential, Jose Behar approached Koppelman and requested the possibility of Secada recording a Spanish-language version of "Just Another Day". Gloria provided backing vocals on "Just Another Day"; it was her first time providing backing harmonies for another artist. Gloria also well as co-wrote the Spanish version of the song, which is titled "Otro Día Más Sin Verte". Secada felt Gloria was instrumental in translating the track.

== Music and lyrics ==
"Just Another Day" is an uptempo, pop and soul, romantic ballad (Note: "mid-to-fast tempo", uptempo pop, uptempo pop and soul, soul, ballad, a romantic pop.) that is characterized by its lively, skipping rhythm and adult contemporary (AC)-and-R&B, metallic, shuffle beats. (Note: lively skipping rhythm, metallic shuffles of adult contemporary and R&B beats.) It has Latin music influences and contains pulsating house music rhythms that broaden its appeal across multiple formats. "Just Another Day" narrates a melancholic tale of lost love. The track is constructed under a catchy hook, and is laced with a seductive Soul II Soul-like, rhythmic cadence in which Secada sings, "I don't want to find another way to make it through the day without you", capturing the lyrics' story of love's sporadic nature, in a baritone-tenor voice. The Palm Beach Post called the track, along with "If You Go" and "Angel", an integration of Secada's Latin rhythms with American pop-and-R&B tones. This is echoed by Deborah Davis of El Norte, who found the track to be a mixture of R&B, and the sound and passion of Latin music. Raquel Riaño of El Confidencial called the track a catchy, romantic pop song and María Ivette Vega Calles of El Nuevo Dia called it an "alternative ballad".

Stephen Holden of The New York Times lauded Secada's ability to transform a "lovelorn ballad" into an impactful song by infusing it with a driving beat, and said while Secada's intense vocal performance lends the song authenticity and credibility. Ricard Riccio of St. Petersburg Times lauded "Just Another Day" as an exceptional, rejuvenating pop song and commended Emilio's sound production but criticized Gloria's backing vocals for failing to prevent the overall blandness of the songs on the album. Waterloo Region Record deemed the Spanish version to be an improvement over the English version, applauding Secada's emotive vocals that are set against minor keys and unpredictable melodies. This combination, according to the review, results in an almost-anthemic expression of poignant longing. Billboard's Larry Flick praised Gloria's harmonies but found Secada had charismatic presence as a contender for top-40 and AC radio. Flick said the production was well-executed and blends a rhythmic, slow groove containing captivating piano melodies and suitably dramatic vocal performance. Flick called "Just Another Day" a great introduction to Secada, noticing his potential for a successful career.

In the song's lyrics, the protagonist desperately clings to a relationship, hoping his partner's inconsistent behavior will change. Expressing his emotions, he says without her, "it's just another day". Charlie Martin of The Messenger said the song's message is lacking because it depicts a person who is constantly depressed due to the unpredictable presence of his lover. According to Joseph Atilano of Inquirer.net, the song has a lively beat that resembles a dance-floor anthem and the lyrics have a poignant impact, particularly resonating with the broken-hearted and lonely. Atilano also said Secada expresses his deep emotions for the woman he loves, despite her indifference, leaving him feeling lost and adrift without her love.

== Critical reception ==
"Just Another Day" was released in both English and Spanish, aimed to capture both markets. The Spokesman-Review called it "easy yet catchy". Jim Abbott of Orlando Sentinel found it to feature "lilting Latin-flavored flare". Chuck Campbell of The Knoxville News-Sentinel lauded Secada's vocal delivery on the track as being powerful and restrained, suggesting that Michael Bolton should take note, while also noting that the song's structure is relatively simple. While praising "Just Another Day" as a "dynamic radio hit", Ernie Long of The Morning Call urged Secada to reduce the dramatic intensity of his vocal delivery on the tracks. Long expressed concern that the singer's tendency to "belt out every song like it's his last" could be detrimental to him, a tactic that has plagued Rick Astley and Bolton.

Don Mayhew of The Fresno Bee found the song to be a mundane journey of lost love and questions the necessity of having "a Richard Marx wannabe". Mario Tarradell of The Miami Herald, suggested "Just Another Day" to have been tailored for radio play. A reviewer in the Huddersfield Daily Examiner expressed their boredom from listening to the recording, as it failed to evoke the same joyous emotions it once brought them. The reviewer found solace in the discovery of superior soul tracks found elsewhere on the album. Billboard's Chuck Taylor expressed the view that the singer had a revolutionary impact on top 40 radio in the 1990s with "Just Another Day", "Angel" (1993), and "If You Go" (1994), likening it to a blowtorch on the airwaves. Michael Paoletta, also from Billboard, recognized Secada's singles "Just Another Day", "Whipped" (1994), and "Too Late Too Soon" (1997), as significant milestones in the singer's success within club scenes during the early 1990s.

Critic Ramiro Burr observed that Secada's vocals on "Just Another Day" exude an emotional intensity akin to Bill Medley. Atilano listed "Just Another Day" as one of his top songs for Valentine's Day, while uncertain if the lyrics are based on real-life experiences for Secada, Atilano finds it to evoke a tug at the listener's heart and the emotional connection is a triumph for Secada. Atilano finds that the raw emotion emitted from "Just Another Day" still resonates over 20 years later. Musicologist Thomas R. Harrison believed that Latin artists, including Secada with "Just Another Day", embraced the idea of releasing albums in both languages, acknowledging their ability to captivate and appeal to diverse markets without hesitation. Desmond Child, the producer of Ricky Martin's "Livin' la Vida Loca" (1999), which led to numerous Latin artists reaching the top of the Hot 100, described it as "an amazing moment", recognizing that the Latin crossover movement had remained stagnant and lacking progress since Secada's "Just Another Day". Riaño felt that people resonated so strongly with "Otro Dia Mas Sin Verte" that it became one of those songs which, regardless of personal taste, either evoke nostalgic sighs or elicit frustrated exclamations after being played relentlessly in the 1990s. Rino considered the track, along with "I Promised Myself", has become a part of music history.

While Grein regarded the Spanish version, "Otro Día Más Sin Verte" as a standout, Ian Russell of Kilmarnock Standard praised it as a dynamic recording. "Just Another Day" propelled Secada into a prominent figure on a national scale, and served as one of the tracks that helped him reach an audience beyond the American Latino community. "Otro Día Más Sin Verte" catapulted Secada to fame, and earned placements on several best-of lists, including Esquire's ranking it at number 38 on their list of the top 100 greatest Spanish songs of all time. It also secured the fifth spot on Espectaculos BCN's list of the 25 best summer songs of the 1990s. "Just Another Day" has since become one of Secada's favorite songs of his career. "Just Another Day" was recognized as one of the best-performing pop songs of the year at the 1993 BMI Pop Awards and again in 1994. "Otro Día Más Sin Verte" won Song of the Year at the first BMI Latin Awards in 1994. It received a nomination for Pop Song of the Year at the 1993 ASCAP Music Awards, though lost to Ana Gabriel's "Evidencias" and "No Sé Tú" by Armando Manzanero.

== Promotion ==
Following Jon Secada's release, Secada embarked on a US tour, making personal appearances and visiting radio stations across the US. Patterson Clark of The Miami Herald noted the importance of distributing the album to radio stations surveyed by Billboard magazine. Secada also appeared on the television chat show The Tonight Show on June 4, 1992. Following the success of "Just Another Day" in the United States, in July 1992, Secada embarked on a promotional tour of England, Europe, and Latin America. When "Otro Día Más Sin Verte" was released as the Spanish counterpart, Tarradell considered the label's ability to promote it on Latin radio stations as an advantage. With the inclusion of "Otro Día Más Sin Verte" on the television drama show Baywatch, Tom Foster of TVOvermind said Baywatch was a fitting platform for Secada's music. In 2014, Secada appeared in a bilingual advertisement for the American fast-food chain Wendy's that parodies "Otro Dia Mas Sin Verte", according to People en Espanol.

Secada performed "Otro Dia Mas Sin Verte" at the 1992 Acapulco Festival, where the audience enthusiastically encouraged him to return for an encore, during which Secada performed "Just Another Day". The performance garnered positive acclaim because it inspired the audience to stand up and dance. Secada also performed the track at Radio City Music Hall on March 26, 1995; Holden noted Secada's falsetto range displayed an "unusual strength and staying power", and described his performance of "Just Another Day" and "Mental Picture" (1994) as having a vocal that carries authentic emotional weight. In December 1999, Secada performed "Just Another Day" at the 11th annual BellSouth Big Orange New Year's Eve celebration. On August 2, 2000, he performed "Just Another Day" at Philadelphia Museum of Art during a visit by George W. Bush as part of his presidential campaign. During the Colors of Christmas celebration at Ordway Center for the Performing Arts in December 2002, Secada led a singalong rendition of "Just Another Day". Jon Bream of the Star Tribune praised Secada, saying he exuded the charm of Barry Manilow but distinguished himself with a more-captivating voice and being "much cuter". On May 31, 2007, Secada performed the song with the Florida Orchestra at Florida State Fairgrounds in Tampa. On October 6 and 7, 2011, he performed the song during the Epcot International Food & Wine Festival at Disney World.

== Chart performance ==
=== North America ===
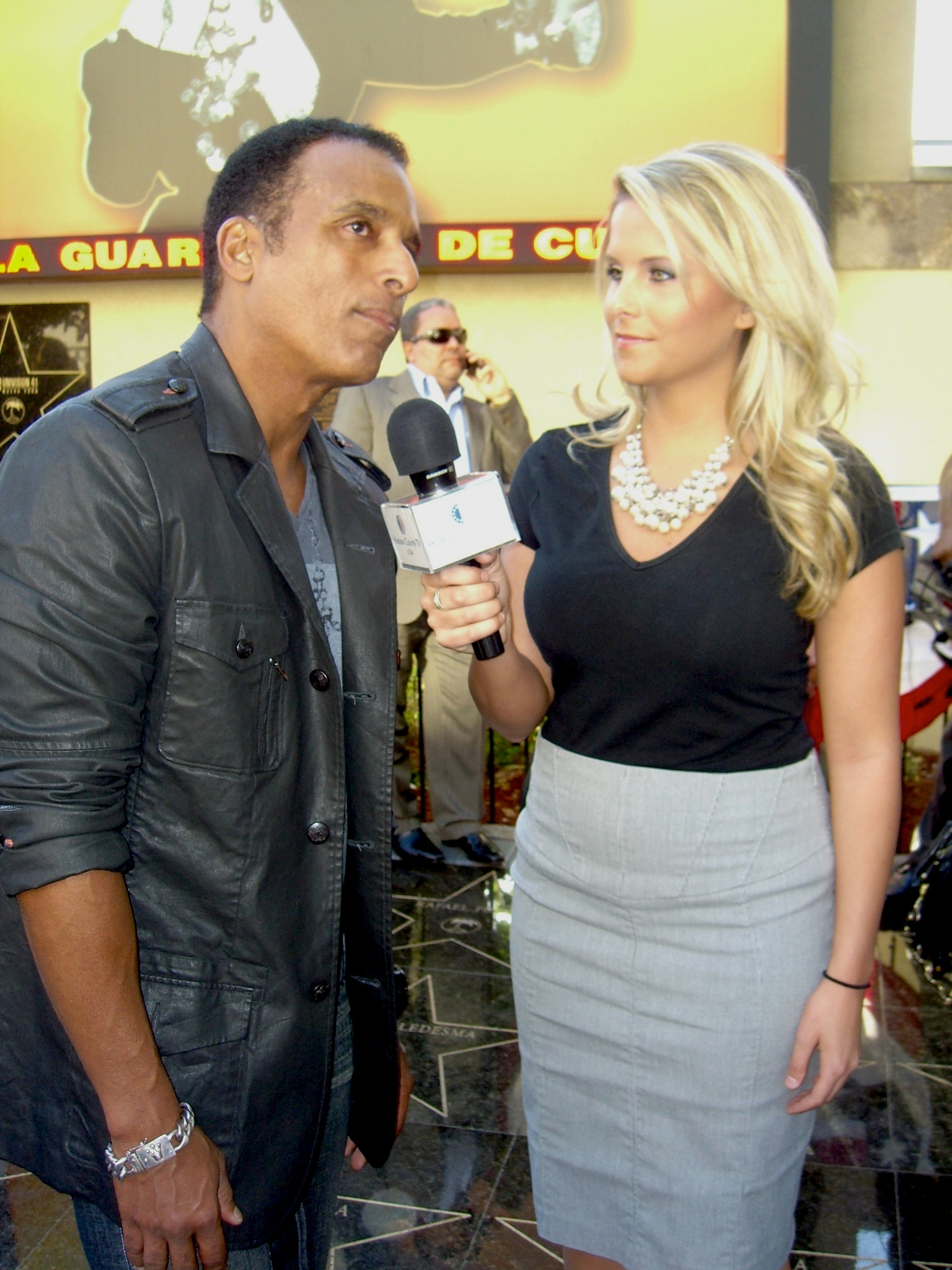
Secada (pictured in 2011) visited Latin radio stations as well as contemporary hit radios and adult contemporary stations, treating their influence equally.

"Just Another Day" was released at the lead single of Jon Secada. It debuted at number 99 on the Billboard Hot 100 for the week ending May 2, 1992. Secada was nervous as "Just Another Day" made its debut on the chart, contemplating the possibility of it quickly exiting the chart. Record executives appeared content and were optimistic about its chart trajectory. Emilio told Secada "Just Another Day" would likely only peak at number 20, telling Norma Niurka of El Nuevo Herald he deliberately gave Secada false hope to prevent him from becoming too confident. "Just Another Day" debuted at number 60 on the Billboard Hot Singles Sales chart for the week ending May 30, 1992. When the track reached number six, Emilio and Gloria Estefan called Secada to inform him; in response, Secada fell silent for a moment before crying over the phone. The label promoted Secada across domestic and international outlets, including showcase performances and extensive radio exposure. "Just Another Day" reached the top ten of the chart for the week ending July 18, 1992, just as its Spanish counterpart, "Otro Dia Mas Sin Verte", spent its third week at number one on the US Billboard Hot Latin Tracks chart. The label simultaneously promoted both versions: SBK Records worked the pop field while its affiliate EMI Latin promoted it on Latin music stations, an unusual tactic in the US.

Secada became the first artist of 1992 to secure the top 40 of the Billboard Hot 100, Hot Latin Tracks, and the Adult Contemporary charts. Latin music chart analyst John Lannert called it an "ultrarare chart triple" and noted the previous song to achieve this was Gloria Estefan with "Out of the Dark" and "Desde La Oscuridad" in 1991. "Just Another Day" peaked at number five on the Billboard Hot 100 chart for the week ending August 1, 1992, and became the first song to reach the top five on the Billboard Hot 100, Adult Contemporary, and the Hot Latin Tracks with "Otro Dia Mas Sin Verte" since Gloria's "Don't Wanna Lose You" and "Si Voy a Perderte" in 1989. "Just Another Day" spent 11 consecutive weeks in the top ten of the Billboard Hot 100 chart. "Otro Dia Mas Sin Verte" was the most-played song on radio stations in Providence, Rhode Island, and Washington, D.C., in the week ending July 3, 1992. It was also the most-played song in Miami in the week ending August 28, 1992, and the second-most-played song in Dallas and New York City, and the fifth-most-played track in Houston and Boston.

While Secada was touring, he visited Latin radio stations, contemporary hit stations, and adult contemporary stations, treating their influence equally. Secada enjoyed "Just Another Day" having the advantage of being a nonformat recording due to the substantial cost and influence required for radio promotion and marketing. "Just Another Day" made its debut at number 47 on the Billboard Adult Contemporary chart for the week ending May 2, 1992; it peaked at number five on the Adult Contemporary chart and at number ten on the Billboard Mainstream Top 40. It also appeared on the Billboard Rhythmic listing, peaking at number 26. The Recording Industry Association of America (RIAA) certified "Just Another Day" gold for shipping over 500,000 copies. "Otro Día Más Sin Verte" gave Secada his first number one on the Hot Latin Tracks chart, where it stayed for five weeks, and was the fourth-best-performing Latin single of 1992. Secada became the first Black artist to top the Hot Latin Tracks chart. "Just Another Day"'s constant demand on radio prevented his song "Do You Believe in Us" (1992) from reaching number one on the Adult Contemporary and Hot 100 charts. "Just Another Day", "Do You Believe in Us", and "Angel" gained Secada recognition as a smooth, versatile pop singer who delivers songs in both English and Spanish. "Just Another Day" ranked at number 15 on Billboard's top Latin and Brazilian songs to have appeared on the Hot 100 in its first 50 years.

"Just Another Day" ended 1992 as the 10th-best-performing song on the Hot 100 chart, and number eight on the Adult Contemporary chart. In Canada, it peaked at number two and reached number one on the country's adult contemporary chart according to RPM. "Just Another Day" made its debut at number nine in The Records Canadian Singles Chart for the week ending July 11, 1992, and ended that year as the best-performing Adult Contemporary song in RPM magazine, and the second-best-performing Canadian Top Singles song. On September 12, 1992, "Just Another Day" received a gold certification from the RIAA for sales of 500,000 copies. Along with its Spanish version, "Just Another Day" has sold one million copies in the US and five million copies worldwide. In 1992, the single became one of the best-selling in the United States. Secada expressed his astonishment at the song's popularity and his delight over the positive reception it has received. He said he was not prepared for the song's popularity and that he never thought he would reach such heights.

The label aimed to replicate Secada's chart success in different markets by capitalizing on the rising popularity of the Barrio Boyzz. Koppelman said Secada's bilingual success was "not a fluke" and that he believed there was potential for Latin music to crossover into pop. Influenced by Secada's achievements, the label began encouraging its other bilingual artists to explore recording in both languages; this approach attracted the attention of non-Hispanic artists such as Bryan Adams, Jon Bon Jovi, and Boyz II Men, who began releasing Spanish-language singles. The label acknowledged to some extent, a division between the two markets will always exist but the level of success Secada achieved surpassed the label's expectations. Following the success of "Just Another Day", Secada's expectations and life immediately changed. Having had some success, he became driven and ambitious. In 2012, to commemorate the 20th anniversary of "Just Another Day", Secada released "I'm Never Too Far Away".

=== Latin America ===
"Otro Dia Mas Sin Verte" gained significant popularity in Mexico, receiving extensive airplay on radio stations. "Just Another Day" received a double-platinum certification, and later attained 5× platinum for selling 500,000 copies. It received gold and platinum certifications. The song ranked among the top-ten best-performing and most popular songs in La Paz, based on polls conducted by local radio stations. According to the United Press International, "Otro Dia Mas Sin Verte" topped several music charts in the capital cities of the Dominican Republic, Mexico, Panama, and Uruguay. It also reached number two in the capital cities of Chile and Ecuador, number four in Lima, Peru, and number six in San Salvador, El Salvador.

"Otro Dia Mas Sin Verte" led Secada to become one of the most-renowned singer-songwriters of the 1990s in Latin America, Europe, and in Mexico. The song gave Secada international recognition and granted him extensive radio exposure in Mexico. Singles such as "Otro Dia Mas Sin Verte", "Angel", and "Ensename" contributed to Secada's sales. He attributed his rise to success to "Otro Dia Mas Sin Verte", and the guidance provided by Emilio and Gloria Estefan. In 2002, "Just Another Day" continued to receive extensive airplay in Mexico.. The English version was the seventh most played song on Brazil's radio charts for the year 1992.

=== Europe and Australasia ===
"Just Another Day" topped Sweden's Sverigetopplistan chart, spending two weeks at this position. The song was a top-ten hit in several other European countries. It reached number two the Czech Republic, the Netherlands (both the Dutch Top 40 and the Single Top 100 charts), and Switzerland. It was the fifth-best-performing of 1992 in the Netherlands. The single peaked at number three in Germany, number four in Ireland and Norway, number five in Austria and the United Kingdom, and number ten in Greece.

In the Flanders region of Belgium, the track peaked at number 21 on the Ultratop 50. "Just Another Day" made its debut at number 27 on Music Week's UK Singles Chart for the week ending August 8, 1992. It charted at number 12 on the Eurochart Hot 100 for the week ending October 10, 1992. It ended 1992 as the UK's fifth-best-performing song. "Just Another Day" was certified gold in Germany and silver in the UK. In Australia, the song spent 20 weeks on the ARIA Singles Chart, reaching number 12 during its seventh week in the chart's top 50. Australian Recording Industry Association (ARIA) certified the song gold for shipping over 35,000 units.

== Music videos ==
While a music video for "Just Another Day" was produced, Secada began a European tour. According to critic Carol Vernallis, Secada's arms rising overhead in a triumphant gesture while the camera tilts upward mirrors the musical progression in "Just Another Day". Vernallis said singers often raise their hands above their heads about two-thirds through the song. In the video, Secada symbolically opens the doors of a church, and both he and the building are bathed in radiant, white light from outside. Gloria Estefan makes a cameo appearance in the music video.

Koppelman worked with Jose Behar to produce a music video for "Otro Dia Mas Sin Verte". He said his approach worked in the US and believed it would translate well in other countries. Foster said while "Otro Dia Mas Sin Verte" is in Spanish, the non-verbal cues and body language of the two people in the video would be easily understandable to non-Spanish speakers.

The video for "Otro Dia Mas Sin Verte" was nominated for Video of the Year at the fifth annual Lo Nuestro Awards in 1993 but the award went to "Una Rosa Es una Rosa" by Mecano. At the Billboard Music Video Awards of 1993, the Spanish-language video won three accolades in the Latin field: Best Male Artist and Best New Artist for Secada, and Best Director for Kevin Layne. VH1 featured Secada as its Artist of the Month while the label promoted "Just Another Day" by launching a television advertising campaign.

== Covers ==
Former New York Yankees center-fielder Bernie Williams recorded a cover of "Just Another Day" for his album Moving Forward (2009). Secada provided lead vocals for the track, and was accompanied by the Harlem Boys & Girls Alumni Choir. Business Wire called William's cover an "energetic reprise". In 2009, Secada released Expressions: The Jazz Album, featuring jazz renditions of his songs, including "Just Another Day". Holden said the jazz version of "Just Another Day" has a sturdy, rhythmic foundation.

== Track listings ==
- US CD single
1. "Just Another Day" (English edit) – 4:15
2. "Just Another Day" (Spanglish edit) – 4:15
3. "Just Another Day" (Spanish edit) – 4:15
4. "Just Another Day" (dance mix) – 5:42
5. "Always Something" (live—recorded in Rotterdam, Holland, May 10, 1991) – 4:13
- UK CD single
1. "Just Another Day" (English edit) – 4:15
2. "Just Another Day" (Spanglish edit) – 4:15
3. "Just Another Day" (dance mix) – 4:15
4. "Always Something" (live) – 4:13

== Credits and personnel ==
Credits adapted from the album's liner notes.

- Jon Secada – lead vocals, background vocals, composer, translator
- Miguel A. Morejon – arrangement, programmer, composer
- Mark Dowdle – engineer
- Jorge Casas – additional producer
- Clay Ostwald – additional producer
- Emilio Estefan, Jr. – producer
- Phil Ramone – mixing and editing
- John Patterson – mixing and editing
- Hugo Dwyer – engineering
- Peter "Ski" Schwartz – keyboard programming
- Rafael Falcon – Drum programming
- David Morales – percussion
- Gloria Estefan – background vocals, translator
- James T. Alfano – programmer
- Rafael Padilla – shaker
- Henry Marguez – art direction
- Carla Leighton – designer

== Charts ==
=== Weekly charts ===
Weekly chart performance for "Just Another Day"
| Chart (1992–1993) | Peak position |
|---|---|
| Australia (ARIA) | 12 |
| Austria (Ö3 Austria Top 40) | 5 |
| Belgium (Ultratop 50 Flanders) | 21 |
| Canada Top Singles (RPM) | 2 |
| Canada Adult Contemporary (RPM) | 1 |
| Czech Republic | 2 |
| Europe (Eurochart Hot 100 Singles) | 6 |
| Europe (European Dance Radio) | 3 |
| Germany (Official German Charts) | 3 |
| Greece (IFPI) | 10 |
| Ireland (IRMA) | 4 |
| Netherlands (Dutch Top 40) | 2 |
| Netherlands (Single Top 100) | 2 |
| New Zealand (Recorded Music NZ) | 2 |
| Norway (VG-lista) | 4 |
| Sweden (Sverigetopplistan) | 1 |
| Switzerland (Schweizer Hitparade) | 2 |
| UK Singles (OCC) | 5 |
| UK Airplay (Music Week) | 2 |
| US Hot 100 (Billboard) | 5 |
| US Adult Contemporary (Billboard) | 5 |
| US Mainstream Top 40 (Billboard) | 10 |
| US Rhythmic (Billboard) | 26 |
| US Cash Box Top 100 | 6 |

Weekly chart performance for "Otro Día Más Sin Verte"
| Chart (1992) | Peak position |
|---|---|
| US Hot Latin Songs (Billboard) | 1 |

2015 weekly chart performance for "Just Another Day"
| Chart (1992) | Position |
|---|---|
| UK Top 10 (Music Week) | 5 |

=== Year-end charts ===
1992 year-end chart performance for "Just Another Day"
| Chart (1992) | Position |
|---|---|
| Australia (ARIA) | 55 |
| Brazil (Crowley) | 7 |
| Canada Top Singles (RPM) | 20 |
| Canada Adult Contemporary (RPM) | 6 |
| Europe (Eurochart Hot 100) | 24 |
| Europe (European Dance Radio) | 9 |
| Europe (European Hit Radio) | 3 |
| Germany (Media Control) | 15 |
| Netherlands (Dutch Top 40) | 5 |
| Netherlands (Single Top 100) | 26 |
| New Zealand (RIANZ) | 34 |
| Sweden (Topplistan) | 14 |
| Switzerland (Schweizer Hitparade) | 27 |
| UK Singles (OCC) | 19 |
| UK Airplay (Music Week) | 5 |
| US Billboard Hot 100 | 10 |
| US Adult Contemporary (Billboard) | 8 |
| US Cash Box Top 100 | 11 |

1992 year-end chart performance for "Otro Día Más Sin Verte"
| Chart (1992) | Position |
|---|---|
| US Hot Latin Tracks (Billboard) | 4 |

=== Decade-end charts ===
| Chart (1990–1999) | Rank |
|---|---|
| Netherlands (Dutch Top 40) | 49 |

== Sales and certifications ==
| Region | Certification | Certified units/sales |
|---|---|---|
| Australia (ARIA) | Gold | 35,000^{^} |
| Germany (BVMI) | Gold | 250,000^{^} |
| Mexico (AMPROFON) | 5× Platinum | 500,000 |
| New Zealand (RMNZ) | Gold | 15,000^{‡} |
| United Kingdom (BPI) | Silver | 200,000^{^} |
| United States (RIAA) | Gold | 500,000^{^} |
^{^} Shipments figures based on certification alone.^{‡} Sales+streaming figures based on certification alone.

== See also ==
- List of number-one Billboard Hot Latin Tracks of 1992

== Works cited ==
- Abbott, Jim (May 8, 1992). "In the Bin". Orlando Sentinel. Archived from the original on June 8, 2023 – via Newspapers.com.
- Armoudian, Maria (July 24, 1993). "Bilingual bonding drove Jon Secada's success". Billboard. Vol. 105, no. 30. Gale A14350221 – via Gale Research.
- Atilano, Joseph R. (February 14, 2017). "My Top 3 Songs for Valentine's Day". Inquirer.net. Gale A481428950.
- Borzillo, Carrie (May 29, 1993). "Carey, Bolton Take Top Honors At BMI Pop Awards" (PDF). Billboard. Vol. 105, no. 22. ISSN 0006-2510.
- Bream, Jon (December 4, 2002). "Newcomers add more sparkle to Colors of Christmas show". Star Tribune. Gale A94892286.
- Bronson, Fred (2003). The Billboard Book of Number 1 Hits. Billboard Books. ISBN 9780823076772.
- Burr, Ramiro (2004). Baker's biographical dictionary of popular musicians since 1990. Schirmer Reference. ISBN 9780028657998.
- Campbell, Chuck (June 24, 1992). "Half May Be Enough for Faith No More". The Knoxville News-Sentinel. Archived from the original on June 8, 2023 – via Newspapers.com.
- Céspedes, Roberto (October 21, 2002). "Entrevista/ Jon Secada/ Vive Jon Secada un nuevo 'Amanecer'". El Norte. Gale A125691486.
- Clark, Patterson (August 17, 1992). "Anatomy of a Hit: How Jon Secada Conquered the Airwaves". The Miami Herald. Archived from the original on June 9, 2023 – via Newspapers.com.
- Coscarón, Jorge (October 29, 2022). "Las 100 mejores canciones en español de la historia por Esquire & amigos". Esquire (in Spanish).
- Davis, Deborah (January 21, 1996). "Anticuado". El Norte. Gale A128473483.
- de Guadalupe, Manto (May 27, 1993). "Breves de Espectaculos". El Siglo de Torreón (in Spanish).
- Fernandez, Pepa (September 26, 2019). "Jon Secada: "'Otro día más sin verte' sigue siendo mi canción favorita"". RTVE.es (in Spanish). Archived from the original on June 11, 2023.
- Fink, Sharon (May 31, 2007). "He's A Sound Machine". St. Petersburg Times. Gale A164267069.
- Flick, Larry (March 14, 1992). "Single Reviews" (PDF). Billboard. Vol. 104, no. 11.
- Foster, Tom (April 13, 2018). "The Top Uses of Jon Secada Songs in Movies or TV". TVOvermind.
- Grein, Paul (September 12, 2009). "Led Zep leads in Aug. certs of gold, platinum". Billboard. Vol. 104, no. 37. Gale A13412013 – via Gale Research.
- Harrison, Thomas R. (2011). Music of the 1990s. Greenwood. ISBN 978-0-313-37942-0.
- Hau, Louis (May 2, 2009). "Bernie Williams: Moving Forward". Billboard. Vol. 121, no. 17. Gale A199911219 – via Gale Research.
- Holden, Stephen (September 19, 2009). "Jon Secada: blending old standards with new swing". The New York Times. Gale A208086207.
- Holden, Stephen (June 19, 1994). "Recordings View; Two Generations Of Latin Crooners". The New York Times. Gale A174445783.
- Holden, Stephen (March 27, 1995). "In Performance; Pop". The New York Times. Gale A155491437.
- Horton, Clare (July 4, 1992). "From Backing Group to Start of a Solo Career". Huddersfield Daily Examiner. Archived from the original on June 9, 2023 – via Newspapers.com.
- Lannert, John (March 30, 1993). "Secada Lead Latin Noms Following Grammy Win". Billboard. Vol. 105, no. 10. ISSN 0006-2510. Archived from the original on January 9, 2023.
- Lannert, John (April 16, 1994). "Secada aims to cross language, format lines". Billboard. Vol. 106, no. 16. Gale A15382007 – via Gale Research.
- Lannert, John (October 10, 1992c). "SBK's dual-lingo promo translates into success". Billboard. Vol. 104, no. 41. Gale A13413577 – via Gale Research.
- Lannert, John (July 18, 1992d). "Latin Notas". Billboard. Vol. 104, no. 29.
- Lannert, John (May 3, 1992). "Estefan Backup Finally Coming Into His Own". Sun Sentinel.
- Lannert, John (May 3, 1992). "Rhythmic Pop, Soulful Vocals Mark Strong Debut". Sun-Sentinel. ProQuest 388941981.
- Larkin, Colin (2011). The Encyclopedia of Popular Music. Omnibus Press. ISBN 9780857125958.
- Lichtman, Irv (June 4, 1994). "Parton, Morejon, Warner Music Tops for BMI" (PDF). Billboard. Vol. 106, no. 23. ISSN 0006-2510.
- Long, Ernie (June 24, 1992). "Jon Secada". The Morning Call. Archived from the original on June 8, 2023 – via Newspapers.com.
- Martin, Charlie (July 24, 1992). "Don't Allow Depressed Feelings to Rule Your Life". The Messenger. Archived from the original on June 9, 2023 – via Newspapers.com.
- Mayhew, Don (July 26, 1992). "The Billboard Top Ten". The Fresno Bee. Archived from the original on June 8, 2023 – via Newspapers.com.
- Morse, Steve (July 30, 1992). "Jon Secada". Boston Globe. ProQuest 294701103.
- Niurka, Norma (July 24, 1992). "Jon Secada". El Nuevo Herald. Archived from the original on June 8, 2023 – via Newspapers.com.
- Novas, Himilce (2007). Everything you need to know about Latino history. Plume. ISBN 9780452288898.
- Paoletta, Michael (March 25, 2000). "Secada Delivers 'Better Part' On 550 Music Debut". Billboard. Vol. 112, no. 13. Gale A61535983 – via Gale Research.
- Pitts, Jr., Leonard (August 26, 1992). "Complete package If looks, personality and talent count, Jon Secada shouldn't be hard to sell". Chicago Tribune. ProQuest 283195897.
- Riaño, Raquel (October 4, 2021). "Jon Secada cumple 60: cómo es hoy la vida de la estrella de los 90". vanitatis.elconfidencial.com (in Spanish).
- Riccio, Ricard (July 3, 1992). "Sound Bite Series". St. Petersburg Times. ProQuest 262910739.
- Rohter, Larry (September 19, 1993). "Pop Music; Latin Music Crosses New Borders". The New York Times. Gale A174686910.
- Rosa del Pino, Andrea M. (June 21, 2017). "¿Qué fue de Jon Secada, cuando se cumplen 25 años de su éxito 'Otro día más sin verte'?". El Mundo (in Spanish).
- Russell, Deborah (November 21, 1992). "Secada, Cyrus, Peniston, Michael Rake it in During Billboard Music Vid Awards" (PDF). Billboard. Vol. 104, no. 47. p. 21. ISSN 0006-2510.
- Russell, Ian (June 26, 1992). "Secada Brings Out the Goosebumps". Kilmarnock Standard – via Newspapers.com.
- Ryan, Gavin (2011). Australia's Music Charts 1988–2010 (PDF ed.). Mt. Martha, VIC, Australia: Moonlight Publishing.
- Sandall, Robert (November 30, 1997). "All by myself; CD Offer". Sunday Times. Gale A59788437.
- Secada, Jon (1992). Jon Secada (Media notes). Emilio Estefan (producer). SBK Records.
- Secada, Jon (2014). A New Day. Penguin Publishing Group. ISBN 978-0698154483.
- Tarradell, Mario (August 6, 1992). "Album Provides Showcase for Secada's Fine Voice". The Miami Herald. Archived from the original on June 8, 2023 – via Newspapers.com.
- Taylor, Chuck (September 10, 2005). "Jon Secada: Window to My Heart". Billboard. Vol. 117, no. 37. Gale A136073469 – via Gale Research.
- Vega Calles, Maria Ivette (August 3, 2017). "Inyecta energia a exitos de los 80 y 90". El Nuevo Día de Puerto Rico. Gale A500162294 – via Gale Research.
- Vernallis, Carol (2004). Experiencing music video: aesthetics and cultural context. Columbia University Press. ISBN 9780231117982.
- Villanueva, Aimara (October 27, 2022). "25 mejores canciones del verano de los 90!". EspectáculosBCN (in Spanish).
- "Eurochart Hot 100 Singles" (PDF). Music & Media. Vol. 9, no. 43. October 24, 1992.
- "European Dance Radio" (PDF). Music & Media. September 19, 1992.
- "Top 10 Sales in Europe" (PDF). Music & Media. Vol. 9, no. 44. October 31, 1992.
- "The RPM Top 100 Hit Tracks of 1992" (PDF). RPM. Vol. 56, no. 25. December 19, 1992.
- "The RPM Top 100 Adult Contemporary tracks of 1992". RPM. Library and Archives Canada.
- "1992 Year-End Sales Charts" (PDF). Music & Media. Vol. 9, no. 51/52. December 19, 1992.
- "Top 100 Singles–Jahrescharts 1992" (in German). GfK Entertainment. Archived from the original on May 9, 2015.
- "Top 100–Jaaroverzicht van 1992". Dutch Top 40. Archived from the original on March 22, 2020.
- "Jaaroverzichten – Single 1992" (in Dutch). MegaCharts. Archived from the original on December 16, 2019.
- "End of Year Charts 1992". Recorded Music NZ. Archived from the original on July 14, 2019.
- "Schweizer Jahreshitparade 1992" (in German). Archived from the original on November 27, 2018.
- "Year End Charts: Top Singles". Music Week. January 16, 1993.
- "Billboard Top 100 – 1992". Archived from the original on July 8, 2009.
- "1992 The Year in Music" (PDF). Billboard. Vol. 104, no. 52. December 26, 1992. Archived (PDF) from the original on June 28, 2021.
- "Topping The Charts Year By Year". Billboard. Vol. 110, no. 48. November 28, 1998.
- "Gold-/Platin-Datenbank (Jon Secada; 'Just Another Day')". Bundesverband Musikindustrie (in German). Archived from the original on February 27, 2023.
- "British single certifications – Jon Secada – Just Another Day". British Phonographic Industry. Archived from the original on December 17, 2022.
- "American single certifications – Jon Secada – Just Another Day". Recording Industry Association of America. Archived from the original on June 6, 2023.
- "Jon Secada – Just Another Day – Charts History". ARIA Top 50 Singles. Archived from the original on September 14, 2017.
- "Jon Secada – Just Another Day – Chart History". Library and Archives Canada. RPM. July 17, 2013. Archived from the original on September 11, 2022.
- "Jon Secada – Just Another Day – Chart Single". Library and Archives Canada. RPM. July 17, 2013.
- "Jona Secada – Just Another Day – Chart History". Irish Singles Chart. Archived from the original on August 4, 2020.
- "Dutch Top 40 > November 28, 1992". Dutch Top 40 (in Dutch). Archived from the original on June 8, 2023.
- "Jon Secada – Just Another Day – Chart History". Single Top 100 (in Dutch). Archived from the original on February 11, 2021.
- "Jon Secada – Just Another Day – Chart History". Swiss Singles Chart. Archived from the original on June 6, 2023.
- "Official Singles Chart Top 75 > 16 August 1992 – 22 August 1992". Official Charts Company. Archived from the original on September 27, 2022.
- "Jon Secada Chart History". Billboard.
- "Jon Secada > Adult Contemporary". Billboard.
- "Jon Secada > Pop Airplay". Billboard.
- "Jon Secada > Rhythmic Airplay". Billboard.
- "Jon Secada > Hot Latin Songs". Billboard.
- "Entertainment". Waterloo Region Record. July 9, 1992. ProQuest 275296308.
- "Album Reviews". The Spokesman-Review. May 3, 1992 – via Newspapers.com.
- "Album Reviews". Huddersfield Daily Examiner. August 29, 1992 – via Newspapers.com.
- "Jon Secada Y Su Nuevo LP". El Siglo de Torreón (in Spanish). June 29, 1994.
- "Just%2BAnother%2BDay"&sScopeID=DR&sDateFrom=01%252F01%252F1992&sDateTo=12%252F31%252F2000&x=31&y=13&RefineQueryView=&StartFrom=5&ViewMode=HTML "Discos Mas Populares de Latinoamerica". El Siglo de Torreón (in Spanish). August 28, 1992.
- "Discos Mas Populares de Latinoamerica". El Siglo de Torreón (in Spanish). February 3, 1993.
- "Regresa Jon Secada". El Siglo de Torreón (in Spanish). May 3, 2000.
- "Discos Mas Populares en E.U." El Siglo de Torreón (in Spanish). July 3, 1992.
- "Discos Mas Populares en E.U." El Siglo de Torreón (in Spanish). August 28, 1992.
- "Discos Mas Populares". El Siglo de Torreón (in Spanish). November 29, 1992.
- "Hit Parade". El Siglo de Torreón (in Spanish). February 22, 1993.
- "Luis Miguel Mantiene Popularidad". El Siglo de Torreón (in Spanish). February 15, 1993.
- "Discos Mas Populares". El Siglo de Torreón (in Spanish). March 5, 1993.
- "Jon Secada Un Verdadero Idolo de la Juventud Mexicana". El Siglo de Torreón (in Spanish). May 27, 1993.
- "Hit Parade". El Siglo de Torreón (in Spanish). December 28, 1993.
- "Hits don't lie: top Billboard Hot 100 Latin songs". Billboard. Vol. 120, no. 38. September 20, 2008. Gale A185429110 – via Gale Research.
- "Singles Top 10 > September 7, 2015". Music Week. September 7, 2015. Gale A430452948 – via Gale Research.
- "BellSouth Big Orange – Bigger Than Ever". PR Newswire. December 2, 1999. Gale A57901675.
- "Bernie Williams' New Album Moving Forward Will Be Released On April 14, 2009". Business Newswire. March 31, 2009. Gale A196824664.
- "Multiple Grammy Winner Jon Secada Returns to His Roots With Release of 'Expressions: The Jazz Album'". PR Newswire. August 14, 2009. Gale A221559297.
- "Multiple Grammy Winner Jon Secada Celebrates 20 Years of Hits with New Single & Music Video 'I'm Never Too Far Away'". PR Newswire. January 28, 2013. Gale A316575220.
- "Scenes From the Big Party Right Gets it Wrong". Cincinnati Post. August 3, 2000. Gale A63861197.
- "Jon Secada". The Palm Beach Post. December 14, 2007. Gale A172485498.
- "Pop Icons 'Bring It' to America Gardens Theatre at Epcot International Food & Wine Festival". Targeted News Service. July 10, 2011. Gale A261005065.
- "Jon Secada parodia uno de sus éxitos en un divertido vídeo (FOTOS Y VÍDEO)". People en Español (in Spanish).
- "Así luce Jon Secada a sus 59 años: De "Miami Sound Machine" a exitoso solista". meganoticias.cl (in Spanish). June 20, 2021.
- "Adult Contemporary > May 2, 1992" (PDF). Billboard. Vol. 106, no. 18. May 2, 1992.
- "Hits of the World". Billboard. Vol. 104, no. 28. July 11, 1992.
- "Hot 100 > August 1, 1992". Billboard. Vol. 104, no. 31. August 1, 1992.
- "Hits of the UK". Billboard. Vol. 104, no. 32. August 8, 1992.
- "Hits of the UK". Billboard. Vol. 104, no. 42. October 17, 1992.
- "Lo Nuestro – Historia" (in Spanish). TelevisaUnivision. Archived from the original on June 26, 2015.
- "Latin Music Conference to Celebrate Prospering Genre". Billboard. Vol. 105, no. 21. May 22, 1993.
- "ASCAP Salutes Latin Writers, Publishers" (PDF). Billboard. Vol. 105, no. 23. June 5, 1993.
