= Do You Believe in Us =

1992 single by Jon Secada

Single by Jon Secada

from the album Jon Secada and Otro Día Más Sin Verte
- B-side: "Misunderstood"
- Released: 1992
- Length: 4:03
- Label: SBK; EMI Latin
- Songwriters: Joseph Stefano; Jon Secada; Miguel Morejon
- Producer: Emilio Estefan Jr.

Jon Secada singles chronology
"Just Another Day" (1992)	"Do You Believe in Us" (1992)	"Angel" (1993)

"Do You Believe in Us" (Spanish: "Cree en nuestro amor") is a song by Cuban recording artist Jon Secada for his debut self-titled studio album and for his debut Spanish-language album, Otro Día Más Sin Verte (1992). It was released in late 1992 as the third single from his Spanish-language album. The English version peaked at numbers 12 and 13 on the US Cash Box Top 100 and Billboard Hot 100 charts, and number three on the Billboard Hot Adult Contemporary chart, while the Spanish version peaked at number one on the US Billboard Hot Latin Tracks chart. The song was also successful in Canada, reaching number three and topping the Adult Contemporary chart for one week. It was composed by Secada, Miguel Morejon, and Joseph Stefano, while Emilio Estefan Jr. produced the piece.

This single was sung by Secada at the 1994 FIFA World Cup opening ceremony.

== Production and success ==
Jon Secada was the backup vocalist for Cuban-American singer Gloria Estefan in 1989. Secada became close friends with her and her husband, Emilio Estefan Jr., who helped guide Secada into the music business. Secada released his self-titled debut album in 1992 with SBK Records. The recording was made up of English-language compositions and two Spanish-language tracks. It was certified triple platinum by the Recording Industry Association of America (RIAA), denoting shipments of three million copies. Secada, with the help from Emilio, decided to release an all Spanish-language album. During the recording sessions, Secada confirmed that Gloria helped translate his English-language recordings into Spanish. He said that she told him to record songs that he would be comfortably fine with singing throughout his career as a singer. She also told them not to "translate everything literally" but to "keep the same theme of the song in play."

"Cree en nuestro amor" was released as the third single from his Spanish album on 15 August 1992, peaking at number one on the US Billboard Hot Latin Tracks on 27 February 1993.

== Track listings ==
- US maxi-CD single
1. "Do You Believe in Us" (hit version) – 3:36
2. "Do You Believe in Us" (hot mix) – 3:57
3. "Do You Believe in Us" (album version) – 3:58
4. "Misunderstood" – 4:22
- US 12-inch single

A. "Do You Believe in Us" (Musto mix) – 4:28
B. "Just Another Day" (Musto mix) – 6:34

- US and Canadian cassette single
1. "Do You Believe in Us" (radio version) – 3:36
2. "Misunderstood" – 4:22
- UK CD single
1. "Do You Believe in Us" (LP version) – 3:58
2. "Do You Believe in Us" (hit version) – 3:36
3. "Do You Believe in Us" (hot mix) – 3:57
4. "Misunderstood" – 4:22
- UK 12-inch single

A1. "Do You Believe in Us" (LP version) – 3:58
B1. "Do You Believe in Us" (hit version) – 3:36
B2. "Do You Believe in Us" (hot mix) – 3:57

- UK 7-inch single

A. "Do You Believe in Us" (LP version) – 3:58
B. "Misunderstood" – 4:22

- European maxi-CD single
1. "Do You Believe in Us" (Musto mix) – 4:28
2. "Do You Believe in Us" (LP version) – 3:58
3. "Just Another Day" (Musto mix) – 6:34
4. "Otro día más sin verte" – 5:25
- Australasian CD single
1. "Do You Believe in Us" (hit version)
2. "Do You Believe in Us" (hot mix)
3. "Just Another Day" (radio Spanish edit)
4. "Just Another Day" (extended radio version)
5. "Misunderstood"
- Japanese CD single
1. "Do You Believe in Us" (hit version)
2. "Do You Believe in Us" (hot mix)
3. "Just Another Day" (radio edit)
4. "Just Another Day" (club edit)

== Credits and personnel ==
Credits are taken from the Otro Día Más Sin Verte liner notes.

- Jon Secada – vocals, composition
- Miguel Morejon – composition
- Joseph Stefano – composition
- Emilio Estefan Jr. – production

== Charts ==
=== Weekly charts ===
Chart (1992–1993)	Peak position
Australia (ARIA)	38
Canada Top Singles (RPM)	3
Canada Adult Contemporary (RPM)	1
Europe (Eurochart Hot 100)	97
Germany (GfK)	19
New Zealand (Recorded Music NZ)	33
Sweden (Sverigetopplistan)	34
UK Singles (Official Charts)	30
UK Airplay (Music Week)	7
US Billboard Hot 100	13
US Adult Contemporary (Billboard)	3
US Hot Latin Songs (Billboard) "Cree en nuestro amor"	1
US Pop Airplay (Billboard)	3
US Rhythmic Airplay (Billboard)	32
US Cash Box Top 100	12

=== Year-end charts ===
Chart (1992)	Position
Canada Top Singles (RPM)	38
Canada Adult Contemporary (RPM)	49

Chart (1993)	Position
US Billboard Hot 100	71
US Adult Contemporary (Billboard)	36

== Release history ==
Region	Date	Format(s)	Label(s)	Ref.
United States	1992	12-inch vinyl; CD; cassette	SBK; EMI Latin	
United Kingdom	October 19, 1992	7-inch vinyl; 12-inch vinyl; CD; cassette	SBK	
Australia	November 23, 1992	CD; cassette	SBK	
Japan	November 25, 1992	CD	SBK	
Australia	November 30, 1992	CD digipak	SBK	
