= The Messenger (Mount Airy, North Carolina) =

- Type: Newspaper
- Format: Tabloid
- Owner(s): Surry Publishing Group, Inc.
- Publisher: Michael Milligan
- Editor: Rebel Good
- Founded: July 9, 2007
- Language: English
- Headquarters: 101 W. Lebanon St., Suite 101. Mount Airy, NC 27030; United States
- Circulation: 11,000 (Wednesdays and Fridays); 20,000 (Sundays)
- Website: surrymessenger.com

The Messenger was an American newspaper published Sundays, Wednesdays and Fridays in Mount Airy, North Carolina. It was delivered free to homes in the Surry County area.

== History ==
The Messenger began as a weekday broadsheet whose first edition was printed on July 9, 2007, after the purchase of The Mount Airy News and Elkin's The Tribune by Heartland Publications. Several staffers, including the publishers of both The News and The Tribune, left their respective newspapers to launch The Messenger as a community newspaper for the area. Combined, the publisher, Michael Milligan, and editor, Rebel Good, have more than 75 years of experience in community journalism and between them have published more than 10 newspapers and magazines.

In January 2009, the paper cut back production to three days per week and switched from broadsheet to tabloid format due to a tough economic market.

In July 2009, a lawsuit filed by Heartland against The Messenger's owners and principals was dismissed without prejudice in Surry Superior Court.

On January 3, 2010, the paper ceased publications with no notification in their last issue, and closed all its operations shortly thereafter. After the community learned that the paper had closed, it was eventually reported that there were several reasons for the closing, but the continuing recession was a primary factor in their decision.
