= Calor (album) =

Studio album by Julio Iglesias
- Released: 5 April 1992
- Recorded: 39:24
- Genre: Latin pop
- Language: Spanish
- Label: Columbia (CBS)

Julio Iglesias chronology
Starry Night (1990)	Calor (1992)	Crazy (1994)

Professional ratings
Review scores
Source	Rating
AllMusic	3/5 stars

Calor (Heat) is a studio album by Julio Iglesias. It was released in 1992 on Columbia Records.

== Reception ==
In the United States the album peaked at number 186 on the Billboard 200 chart for the week of June 6, 1992.

Calor was nominated for Grammy Award for Best Latin Pop Album, but didn't win.

== Track listing ==
No.	Title	Writer(s)	Length
1.	"Milonga Medley: Milonga Sentimental / Vivo"	Ramón Arcusa / Homero Manzi / Sebastián Piana	4:05
2.	"Lia"	José María Cano	3:59
3.	"A Caña y a Cafe"	José Luis Perales	4:24
4.	"La Quiero Como Es"	Ramón Arcusa	4:07
5.	"De Domingo a Domingo"	Ramón Arcusa	3:21
6.	"Uno"	Enrique Santos Discépolo / Mariano Mores	4:37
7.	"Y Aunque Te Haga Calor"	José María Cano	3:49
8.	"Me Ama Mô"	Zé Catimba / Martinho da Vila	3:35
9.	"Somos"	Mario Clavel	3:44
10.	"Esos Amores"	Roberto Livi / Rudy Pérez	3:43
Total length:			39:24

== Charts ==
=== Weekly charts ===
Weekly chart performance for Calor
Chart (1992–1993)	Peak position
Belgian Albums (IFPI)	9
Dutch Albums (Album Top 100)	1
European Albums (Music & Media)	13
French Albums(SNEP)	12
German Albums (Offizielle Top 100)	72
Portuguese Albums (AFP)	4
Spanish Albums (AFYVE)	1
Swedish Albums (Sverigetopplistan)	49
US Billboard 200	186
US Top Latin Albums (Billboard)	34
US Latin Pop Albums (Billboard)	4

=== Year-end charts ===
Chart (1992)	Position
Brazilian Albums (Nopem)	41
Dutch Albums (Album Top 100)	19
European Top 100 Albums (Music & Media)	41
French Albums (SNEP)	60
Spanish Albums (AFYVE)	1
US Latin Pop Albums (Billboard)	14

== Certifications ==
Region	Certification	Certified units/sales
Argentina (CAPIF)	2× Platinum	120,000^{^}
Belgium (BRMA)	Gold	
Brazil (Pro-Música Brasil)	Platinum	250,000^{*}
Chile	Platinum	
Colombia	Gold	
Italy (FIMI)	Gold	50,000^{*}
Netherlands (NVPI)	Gold	50,000^{^}
Singapore (RIAS)	Gold	
Spain (PROMUSICAE)	5× Platinum	500,000^{^}
Venezuela	Gold	
Summaries
Worldwide Sales up to July 1992	—	2,000,000
^{*} Sales figures based on certification alone.^{^} Shipments figures based on certification alone.

== See also ==
- List of number-one albums of 1992 (Spain)
