= Mi Vida Eres Tú (album) =

Mi Vida Eres Tu

Studio album by Los Temerarios
- Released: 1992; 34 years ago
- Recorded: 1992
- Genres: Romantic music, Latin music
- Language: Spanish
- Labels: Disa 1992; AFG Sigma Records 1993; Fonovisa 1996

Los Temerarios chronology
Te Quiero... (1990)	Mi Vida Eres Tu (1992)	Tu Ultima Cancion (1993)

Mi Vida Eres Tú (My Life Is You) is the ninth studio album by Mexican grupera band Los Temerarios, released in 1992. It was nominated for Regional Mexican Album of the Year at the 1993 Lo Nuestro Awards.

== Track listing ==
No.	Title	Writer(s)	Length
1.	"Mi Vida Eres Tu"	Adolfo Angel Alba	4:08
2.	"Por Primera Vez"	Gustavo Ángel Alba	3:21
3.	"Yo Te Amo"	Adolfo Angel Alba	3:29
4.	"Fuiste Mala"	Adolfo Angel Alba	3:12
5.	"Perdóname"	Adolfo Angel Alba	3:45
6.	"Extrañandote"	Adolfo Angel Alba	3:45
7.	"A Quien Quieres Engañar"	Adolfo Angel Alba	4:11
8.	"O el O Yo"	Adolfo Angel Alba	3:28
9.	"Esa Mujer"	Gustavo Ángel Alba	3:14
10.	"Alejate"	Adolfo Angel Alba	3:04

== Charts ==
Chart (1992–1993)	Peak position
US Top Latin Albums (Billboard)	49
US Regional Mexican Albums (Billboard)	1

== Sales and certifications ==
Region	Certification	Certified units/sales
Mexico	—	1,000,000
United States (RIAA)	4× Platinum (Latin)	240,000^{‡}
^{‡} Sales+streaming figures based on certification alone.
