= Angel (Jon Secada song) =

Single by Jon Secada

from the album Jon Secada
- Released: January 1993
- Genre: Pop
- Length: 4:35
- Label: EMI Latin; SBK
- Songwriters: Jon Secada; Miguel A. Morejon
- Producer: Emilio Estefan Jr.

Jon Secada singles chronology
"Do You Believe in Us" (1992)	"Angel" (1993)	"I'm Free" (1993)

"Angel" is a song recorded by Cuban singer-songwriter Jon Secada for his eponymous debut studio album, Jon Secada (1992). Written by Secada and Miguel Morejon, SBK Records released it as the album's third single in January 1993 by EMI Latin and SBK. The Spanish version of "Angel" served as the second single of the album. The recording was inspired by a real-life experience that Secada encountered during a concert in Amsterdam. A downtempo romantic soul pop ballad, the track portrays a traditional storyline in which a man goes through the conclusion of a relationship, paying tribute to what he calls a lasting love.

The majority of music critics gave positive reviews on "Angel". Critics praised Secada's vocal range, strength, and emotive vocal delivery, while others compared his impact on top 40 radio. "Angel" received the nomination for Pop Song of the Year at the 1993 Lo Nuestro Awards. It received the award for being among the most-played recording of 1993 at the ASCAP Pop Music Awards, while Morejon and Gloria Estefan received the BMI Songwriter Award for composing the Spanish version of "Angel". The track peaked at numbers six and 18 on the US Cash Box Top 100 and Billboard Hot 100 charts, while the Spanish counterpart peaked at number one on the Billboard Hot Latin Songs chart, providing Secada the second number-one single of his career. While the Spanish version ended 1992 as the eighth most successful Latin single, "Angel" ended 1993 as the 72nd best-performing track on the Hot 100 chart.

== Background and production ==
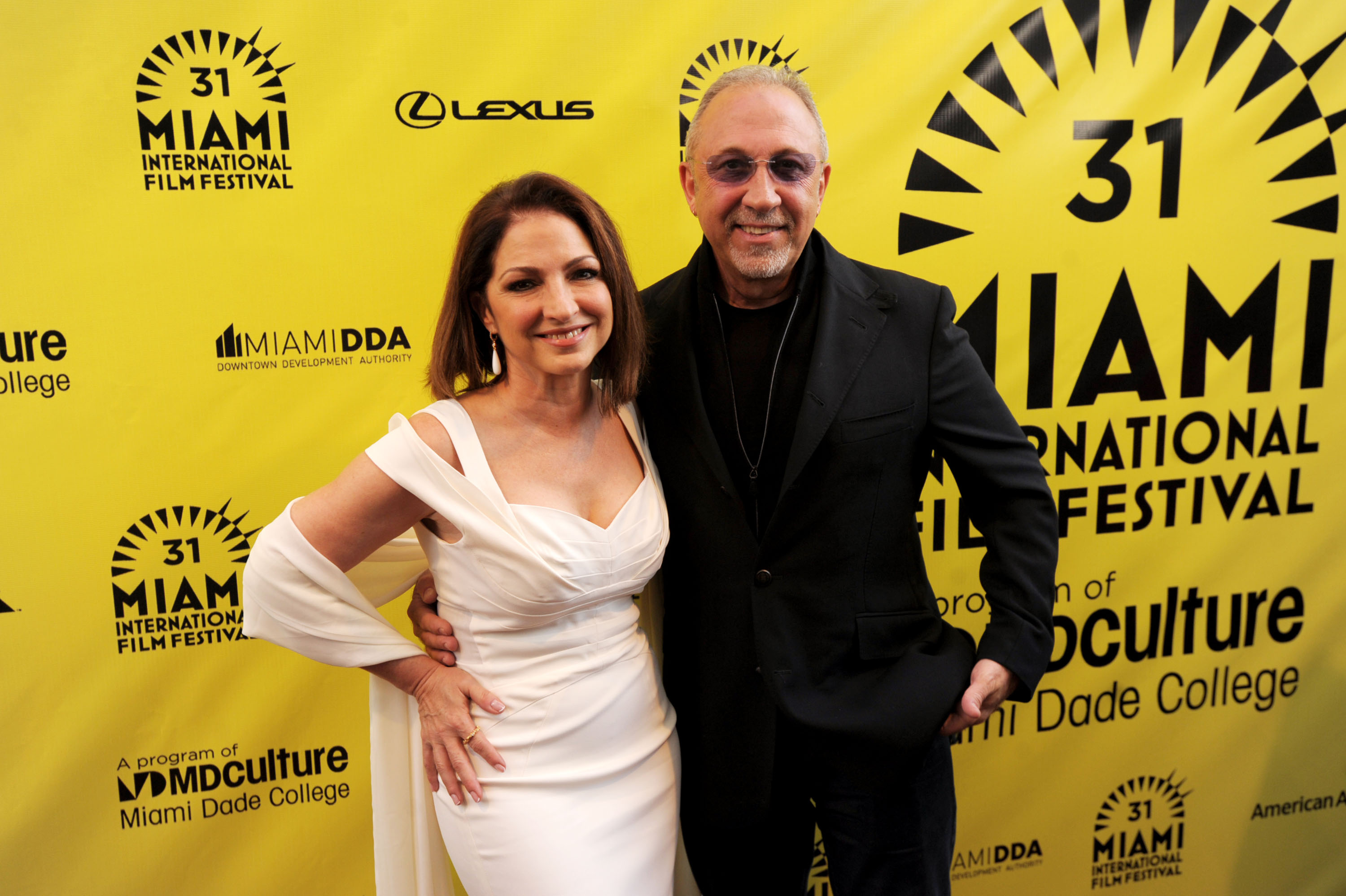
Emilio Estefan and Gloria Estefan (pictured together in 2014) assisted Jon Secada on "Angel".

Jon Secada auditioned for his school's musical production of Charles Dickens' A Christmas Carol, and discovered his passion for music. He attended the University of Miami, earning a master's degree in Jazz Vocal Performance. He composed songs for various artists, and in 1987, music producer Emilio Estefan received a demo tape of Secada and was impressed by his potential for success. In 1988, Secada released a Spanish-language album that didn't receive much attention. He then became a backup vocalist for Gloria Estefan in 1989 and wrote "Say" for her album Cuts Both Ways (1989). Secada also composed six tracks for her album Into the Light (1991), two of which, "Coming Out of the Dark" (1991) and "Can't Forget You" (1991), peaked at number one on the US Billboard Hot 100 chart. He provided backing vocals for Gloria during her world tour for the album.

Secada had a desire to pursue a solo career. Emilio guided Secada in developing his songwriting trajectory, and advised him on refining his abilities. He encouraged Secada to create his own music and develop a distinctive sound. Emilio also emphasized the importance of improving his appearance to the best of his abilities. Emilio shared a demo tape of Secada with Nancy Brennan, the vice president of A&R at SBK Records, and Charles Koppelman, the chairman of EMI Records, both of whom were impressed. Brennan and Koppelman traveled from New York City to London to watch Secada perform at Wembley Stadium, where Gloria introduced him. After six hours of negotiations, Secada signed a recording contract with the label. Koppelman expressed a desire for Secada to thrive as a versatile artist beyond specific genres. Emilio saw the timing as opportune for Secada's solo career, as there were limited alternatives to rap and metal at the time. He described Secada as a pop and R&B artist and believed that Secada represented a unique genre that people were eager for. Emilio took on the role of Secada's manager, and producer.

Faced with concerns about a scarcity of original material, Secada sensed the urgency to swiftly demonstrate to record executives his artistic essence. He then contacted Miguel Morejon and the two of them secluded themselves in a period of intense emotional exhilaration and penned several songs. Secada felt that Morejon played a pivotal role in his artistic growth and development as a musician. Phil Ramone produce "Just Another Day" and "Angel", and Secada expressed his gratitude for having him produce both tracks. Tracks, such as "Angel" and "Mental Picture", are based on real-life experiences. While writing several songs, Secada became aware that the lyrics he was penning reflected a dearth of profound emotional connections in his life. During a concert in Amsterdam, Secada encountered a woman with whom he later engaged in an affair. Initially desiring a platonic relationship, the singer gradually developed an attraction to her, finding her European charm immensely alluring. Secada had to convince the label to record the Spanish version of "Angel", who initially did not know he knew Spanish. Gloria assisted Secada with the Spanish translation of the lyrics.

== Composition and reception ==
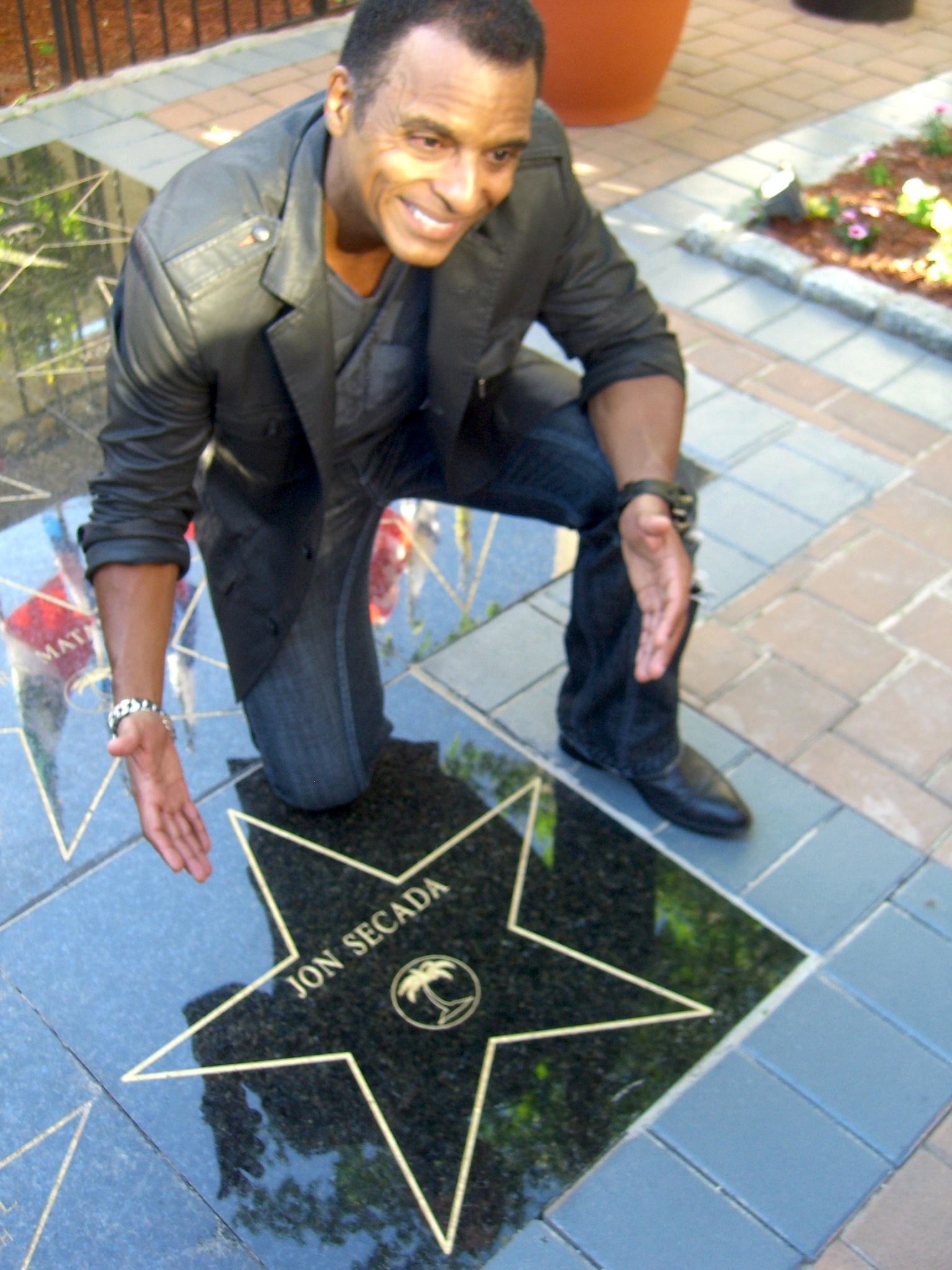
Critics praised Secada's vocal range, strength, and emotive vocal delivery, while others compared his impact on top 40 radio.

"Angel" is a downtempo romantic soul pop ballad. (Note: downtempo love song, romantic ballad, a pop ballad, a ballad, a soul track.) Lyrically, it depicts a conventional narrative where a man experiences the end of a relationship, giving homage to an enduring love. Secada provides an emotive vocal delivery on "Angel", and is accompanied by piano. Secada referred to "Angel" as being the most romantic song of his musical career, noting that people often associate him with the recording. Colin Larkin in The Encyclopedia of Popular Music, described "Angel" as being a romantic pop track. According to John Lannert of Billboard, "Angel" was described as an intense and passionate declaration of love. Secada described his musical style as a fusion of pop and R&B, infused with a touch of Latin flavor in the percussion. He emphasized that the fundamental element of his music is pop. Referred to as a "tender ballad", "Angel" has also been described as being a pop and R&B track.

Larry Flick of Billboard believed that Secada had the potential to replicate the broad chart success of "Just Another Day". Flick described it as an elegant piece where Secada demonstrates a commendable vocal range and strength comparable to Michael Bolton while avoiding unnecessary bravado. Flick found Gloria's Spanish translation of the lyrics to be a nice touch. Chuck Taylor, also from Billboard, expressed the view that Secada had a revolutionary impact on top 40 radio in the 1990s with "Just Another Day", "Angel", and "If You Go" (1994), likening it to a blowtorch on the airwaves. Critic Ramiro Burr found Secada to have passionately poured his emotions into "Angel", adding a touch of intensity to the song, calling it a perfectly suited song for slow dancing on prom night.

Jan DeKnock of Chicago Tribune named "Angel" as their pick song of the week, calling it an alluring track. While Michael Saunders of Boston Globe expressed the view that listeners could live without "Angel", considering it as a pseudo-soul track, Steve Morse, also from Boston Globe, provided a more positive review of "Angel". Morse felt that Secada possessed one of the "smoothest new pop voices" on tracks "Just Another Day", "Angel", and "Do You Believe in Us?", which allowed him to make a significant crossover between the top 40 and Latin charts. Billboard's Chuck Taylor opined that Secada exerted significant influence in both the Spanish and English markets with "Just Another Day", "If You Go", and "Angel". Mary Ann Bourbeau of Courier News, found Secada's vocal delivery in "Angel" to be smooth. Charles Runnells of The News Press, called it a romantic hit single that, along with "Just Another Day", enhanced Secada's music sales.

It received a nomination for Pop Song of the Year at the 1993 Premio Lo Nuestro. It received the ASCAP Pop Music Award for being among the most-performed song of 1993. Morejon and Gloria received the BMI Songwriter Award for composing "Angel". In 2009, Secada released Expressions: The Jazz Album, featuring jazz renditions of his songs including "Angel". Secada aimed for the album to possess a cohesive concept, and took inspiration from songs performed by Johnny Hartman. Mexican singer, Yuridia, covered "Angel" during a concert in Monterrey, Mexico in May 2009. Bernard Quilala performed his rendition of "Angel" during the second season of Canadian Idol, while Steve Karson performed the track during the third season. David Ionich performed "Angel" during the first season of Latin American Idol. Following Johnny Baretto's cover of "Angel" during the tenth season of American Idol, Secada tweeted Baretto of his appreciation and being flattered that he performed "Angel", calling it a "good rendition".

== Promotion ==
In August 1992, EMI Latin began promoting the Spanish version of "Angel" on Latin radio stations. Koppelman explained the promotional differences between Secada's songs that followed "Just Another Day", was due to timing discrepancies. While "Otro Dia Mas Sin Verte", the Spanish counterpart to "Just Another Day", reached its peak on the Hot Latin Songs chart, "Just Another Day" completed its chart ascent on the Hot 100 two months later. Koppelman wanted to maintain chart momentum and EMI Latin decided to release "Angel" to Latin radio in August. "Angel" was initially going to be the follow-up to "Just Another Day" for the top 40 radio, but was replaced with "Do You Believe in Us?", due to its slow-paced nature. Koppelman believed that since "Just Another Day" had a long stay on the charts as an upbeat recording, it was necessary to follow it up with a similar track. He felt that if they released a ballad as the next single, it would not receive enough rotations. He was concerned that "Angel" might get lost on the radio, whereas "Do You Believe in Us?" was a faster-paced record that could stand out.

At the 1993 Acapulco Festival in Monterrey, Mexico, Secada concluded his performance with "Angel". A review in El Siglo de Torreón noted that the audience was captivated by his performance, highlighting the song's role in his success in the country. In an October 1994 concert at the Auditorio Nacional, Secada delivered an unplugged rendition of "Angel" accompanied by a guitar. Secada performed "Angel" during the KISS and Unite AIDS benefit concert at Irvine Meadows in April 1993. Rick Vanderknyff of the Los Angeles Times, found that Secada effortlessly showcased his vocal abilities on "Angel", "Just Another Day", and "Do You Believe in Us?". During his performance of "Angel" at the O'Keefe Centre in March 1995, Ira Band of the Toronto Star, described Secada's rendition as a display of his husky tenor vocal range, with a lack of restraint that bordered on acrobatic Olympic proportions. On April 7, 1995, Secada performed "Angel" and dedicated it to Selena, who was shot and killed a week earlier, at the Cynthia Woods Mitchell Pavilion in The Woodlands, Texas.

On April 17, 1995, he performed the track at the Knight Center in Miami. Deborah Walker of the Sun Sentinel, observed that Secada's performance exuded audacious confidence, showcasing his agile falsetto on "Angel" and "Mental Picture". While Walked noted that Secada did not perform with grace, she acknowledged that he delivered the necessary power that these ballads required, consistently evoking cheers from fans. In June 1995, Secada performed "Angel" and other songs during an all-star concert at the Tinley Park in Chicago. Monica Eng of the Chicago Tribune believed that Secada effortlessly delivered his recordings during the concert. He also performed acoustic versions of "Angel", "Just Another Day", and "Do You Believe in Us?" at Miami-Dade Community College during a workshop he taught. In December 1999, Secada performed "Angel" at the 11th annual BellSouth Big Orange New Year's Eve celebration. Secada performed "Angel" in Central Park in a public ceremony for Pope John Paul II. Secada described it as one of the highlights of his career.

== Chart performance ==
"Angel" was released as the third single off of Jon Secada. It debuted at number 83 on the US Billboard Hot 100 chart, in the week ending January 30, 1993. It peaked at number 18 on the week ending April 24, 1993, and ended the year as the 72nd best-performing song on the Hot 100 chart. It was the 69th best-performing song on the Hot 100 Airplay chart and number 14 on the Adult Contemporary chart. The Spanish version peaked at number one on the Billboard Hot Latin Songs survey, in the week ending October 31, 1992. It provided Secada the second number-one single of his career, following "Otro Dia Mas Sin Verte" (1992), and spent six weeks atop the chart. It was the most-played song in Boston, Dallas, Houston, New York City, Washington D.C., the third most-played song in Chicago, and the fourth most-played in Miami. It ended 1992 as the ninth-most successful track on the Hot Latin Songs chart. The Spanish version peaked at number six on the Billboard Latin Pop Digital Song Sales chart, in the week ending March 19, 2011. "Angel" garnered Secada the largest acclaim in Mexico. It ranked among the most popular songs on radio stations in Mexico in the week ending May 19, 1993. It peaked at number one in the capital cities of Brazil, the Dominican Republic, El Salvador, Panama, number two in Chile, number 4 in Panama, and number 15 in Mexico.

Following the success of the Spanish versions of "Just Another Day" and "Angel", the label decided to release an all-Spanish-language album for Secada. Emilio, insisting on Secada becoming a bilingual artist, believed there was untapped potential in that market. Initially, Secada had no plans to record in Spanish, but Emilio decided to test, "Just Another Day" and "Angel", to see how well they performed in Latin markets. The response from Latin radio stations and record buyers was overwhelmingly positive, leading to the recording of the Spanish-language version of Jon Secada, titled Otro Dia Mas Sin Verte. Gloria noted that Secada's target market was the pop market and found that the crossover worked in reverse. The chart success of "Angel" and other songs on Jon Secada, provided Secada opportunities to explore other avenues in music such as performing in Broadway and acting. Secada became a popular recording artist as a result of "Angel" and "Otro Día Más Sin Verte", and found success with those songs in the early 1990s.

== Track listings ==
- US Maxi-Single
1. "Angel" (Radio Edit)
2. "Angel" (Album Version)
3. "Angel" (Spanglish Edit)
4. "Angel" (Spanish Album Version)
5. "One of a Kind"
- Europe Maxi-Single
1. "Angel" (Radio Edit)
2. "Angel" (Album Version)
3. "Angel" (Spanglish Edit)
4. "Angel" (Spanish Album Version)
- UK CD Single
1. "Angel" (Radio Edit)
2. "Just Another Day" (English Version)
3. "Angel" (Spanish Album Version)

== Credits and personnel ==
Credits adapted from the album's liner notes.

- Jon Secada – lead vocals, composer
- Miguel A. Morejon – composer
- Jorge Casas – additional producer
- Clay Ostwald – additional producer
- Emilio Estefan, Jr. – producer
- Phil Ramone – mixer and editor
- Mike Couzzi – mixer and editor
- Eric Shiling – mixer and editor
- John Patterson – mixer and editor
- Gloria Estefan – translator

== Charts ==
=== Weekly charts ===
Weekly chart performance for "Angel"
Chart (1992–1993)	Peak position
Australia (ARIA)	112
Canada Top Singles (RPM)	4
Canada Adult Contemporary (RPM)	2
Europe (Eurochart Hot 100)	69
Europe (European Hit Radio)	23
Germany (GfK)	72
Netherlands (Dutch Top 40)	34
Netherlands (Single Top 100)	35
New Zealand (Recorded Music NZ)	45
UK Singles (Official Charts)	23
UK Airplay (Music Week)	45
US Billboard Hot 100	18
US Adult Contemporary (Billboard)	3
US Pop Airplay (Billboard)	9
US Cash Box Top 100	6

Weekly chart performance for "Angel" (Spanish version)
Chart (1992)	Peak position
US Hot Latin Songs (Billboard)	1

=== Year-end charts ===
Year-end chart performance for "Angel"
Chart (1993)	Position
Canada Top Singles (RPM)	45
Canada Adult Contemporary (RPM)	11
US Billboard Hot 100	72
US Adult Contemporary (Billboard)	14

Year-end chart performance for "Angel" (Spanish version)
Chart (1992)	Position
US Hot Latin Tracks (Billboard)	9

== See also ==
- List of number-one Billboard Hot Latin Tracks of 1992

== Works cited ==
- Larkin, Colin (2011). The Encyclopedia of Popular Music. Omnibus Press. ISBN 9780857125958.
- Novas, Himilce (2007). Everything you need to know about Latino history. Plume. ISBN 9780452288898.
- Secada, Jon (2014). A New Day. Penguin Publishing Group. ISBN 978-0698154483.
- Burr, Ramiro (2004). Baker's biographical dictionary of popular musicians since 1990. Schirmer Reference. ISBN 9780028657998.
