= Jon Secada (album) =

Studio album by Jon Secada
- Released: May 5, 1992
- Recorded: 1991–1992
- Studio: Crescent Moon Studios (Miami, Florida); The Hit Factory (New York City, New York)
- Genre: Pop; R&B; Latin pop
- Length: 53:51
- Label: SBK
- Producer: Emilio Estefan, Jr.; Clay Ostwald; Jorge Casas

Jon Secada chronology
Jon Secada (1992)	Otro Día Más Sin Verte (1992)

Singles from Jon Secada
- 1. "Just Another Day" Released: March 16, 1992; 2. "Do You Believe in Us" Released: 1992; 3. "Angel" Released: January 1993; 4. "I'm Free" Released: 1993

Professional ratings
Review scores
Source	Rating
AllMusic	4/5 stars
Entertainment Weekly	C+

Jon Secada is the English-language debut album by Cuban American pop singer Jon Secada, released in 1992. The album features four singles that reached the top 40 on the US Billboard Hot 100 or the top 10 on Billboard's Adult Contemporary chart, including "Just Another Day", which was also a big hit worldwide. The album was certified 3× Platinum by the RIAA. It peaked at number 15 on the Billboard 200 album chart in March 1993. At the 5th Lo Nuestro Awards, the album won the award for "Pop Album of the Year".

== Track listing ==
All songs written by Jon Secada and Miguel A. Morejon, except as noted.

1. "Just Another Day" – 5:25
2. "Dreams That I Carry" – 4:46
3. "Angel" – 4:34
4. "Do You Believe in Us" – 3:58
5. "One of a Kind" – 4:02 (Secada)
6. "Time Heals" – 4:24 (Willy Perez Feria)
7. "Do You Really Want Me" – 4:04
8. "Misunderstood" – 4:22 (Secada, Scott Shapiro, Tom McWilliams, Jo Pat Cafaro)
9. "Always Something" – 4:13 (Secada, Clay Ostwald, Jorge Casas)
10. "I'm Free" – 4:01
11. "Otro Día Más Sin Verte" (Spanish version of "Just Another Day") – 5:27 (Secada, Morejon, Gloria Estefan)
12. "Angel" (Spanish version) – 4:35 (Secada, Morejon, Estefan)

== Personnel ==
=== Musicians ===
- Jon Secada – lead vocals, backing vocals (1, 2, 4–11)
- Miguel A. Morejon – programming (1–5, 7, 10–12), arrangements (1–5, 7, 10–12)
- Clay Ostwald – additional programming (3, 4, 8, 12), keyboards (6, 9), programming (6, 9), arrangements (6, 9), clavinet (8)
- Emilio Estefan Jr. – accordion (5)
- Scott Shapiro – programming (8), guitar solo (8), arrangements (8)
- John DeFaria – guitars (2, 3, 6, 7, 9, 12)
- Rene Luis Toledo – guitars (3, 10), guitar solo (12)
- Jorge Casas – bass (3, 4, 7, 9, 10, 12), programming (6, 9), arrangements (6, 9), fretless bass (6)
- Rafael Falcon – additional drum programming (1, 4, 11), additional programming (5)
- Tom McWilliams – additional drum programming (4), programming (8), arrangements (8)
- Rafael Padilla – shaker (1, 3, 4, 8, 11, 12), percussion (2, 5, 6, 9), tambourine (4, 12)
- Rouge Cougu – percussion (10), shaker (10)
- Ed Calle – flute (5)
- Gloria Estefan – backing vocals (1, 11)
- Anita Faye Green – backing vocals (2, 7–10)
- Rita Quintero – backing vocals (5)
- Charlotte McKinnon – backing vocals (7–9)
- Mark Dowdle – vocal intro (9)

=== Production ===
- Jorge Casas – producer
- Emilio Estefan Jr. – producer, management
- Clay Ostwald – producer, engineer
- Mike Couzzi – engineer, mixing (2–4, 6, 9)
- Mark Dowdle – engineer
- Charles Dye – engineer
- Patrice Levinsohn – engineer
- John Patterson – engineer
- Freddy Piñero Jr – engineer
- Eric Schilling – engineer, mixing (5, 7, 8, 10, 12)
- Ron Taylor – engineer
- Phil Ramone – mixing (1, 3, 11, 12)
- Bob Ludwig – mastering at Masterdisk (New York, NY)
- Henry Marquez – art direction
- Carla Leighton – design concept
- Alberto Tolot – cover photography
- Timothy White – other photography
- Paco – hair design
- Mike Blanco – hair stylist
- Lazaro Cuervo – make-up

== Charts ==
=== Weekly charts ===
Weekly chart performance for Jon Secada
Chart (1992–1993)	Peak position
Australian Albums (ARIA)	89
Austrian Albums (Ö3 Austria)	15
Dutch Albums (Album Top 100)	43
German Albums (Offizielle Top 100)	5
Spanish Albums (AFYVE)	1
Swedish Albums (Sverigetopplistan)	39
Swiss Albums (Schweizer Hitparade)	7
UK Albums (OCC)	20
US Billboard 200	15
US Latin Pop Albums (Billboard)	1

=== Year-end charts ===
1992 year-end chart performance for Jon Secada
Chart (1992)	Position
German Albums (Offizielle Top 100)	79
US Latin Pop Albums (Billboard)	6

1993 year-end chart performance for Jon Secada
Chart (1993)	Position
German Albums (Offizielle Top 100)	78
US Billboard 200	31
US Latin Pop Albums (Billboard)	5

=== All-time charts ===
All-time chart performance for Jon Secada
Chart (1985–1994)	Position
US Latin Pop Albums (Billboard)	2

== Sales and certifications ==
Sales and certifications for Jon Secada
Region	Certification	Certified units/sales
Argentina	—	48,000
Brazil (Pro-Música Brasil)	Gold	250,000
Canada (Music Canada)	3× Platinum	300,000^{^}
Germany (BVMI)	Gold	250,000^{^}
Mexico	—	300,000
Spain (PROMUSICAE)	2× Platinum	200,000^{^}
Switzerland (IFPI Switzerland)	Gold	25,000^{^}
United Kingdom (BPI)	Gold	100,000^{^}
United States (RIAA)	3× Platinum	3,000,000^{^}
^{^} Shipments figures based on certification alone.

== See also ==
- List of number-one Billboard Latin Pop Albums from the 1990s
