= Jon Secada =

American singer (born 1961)

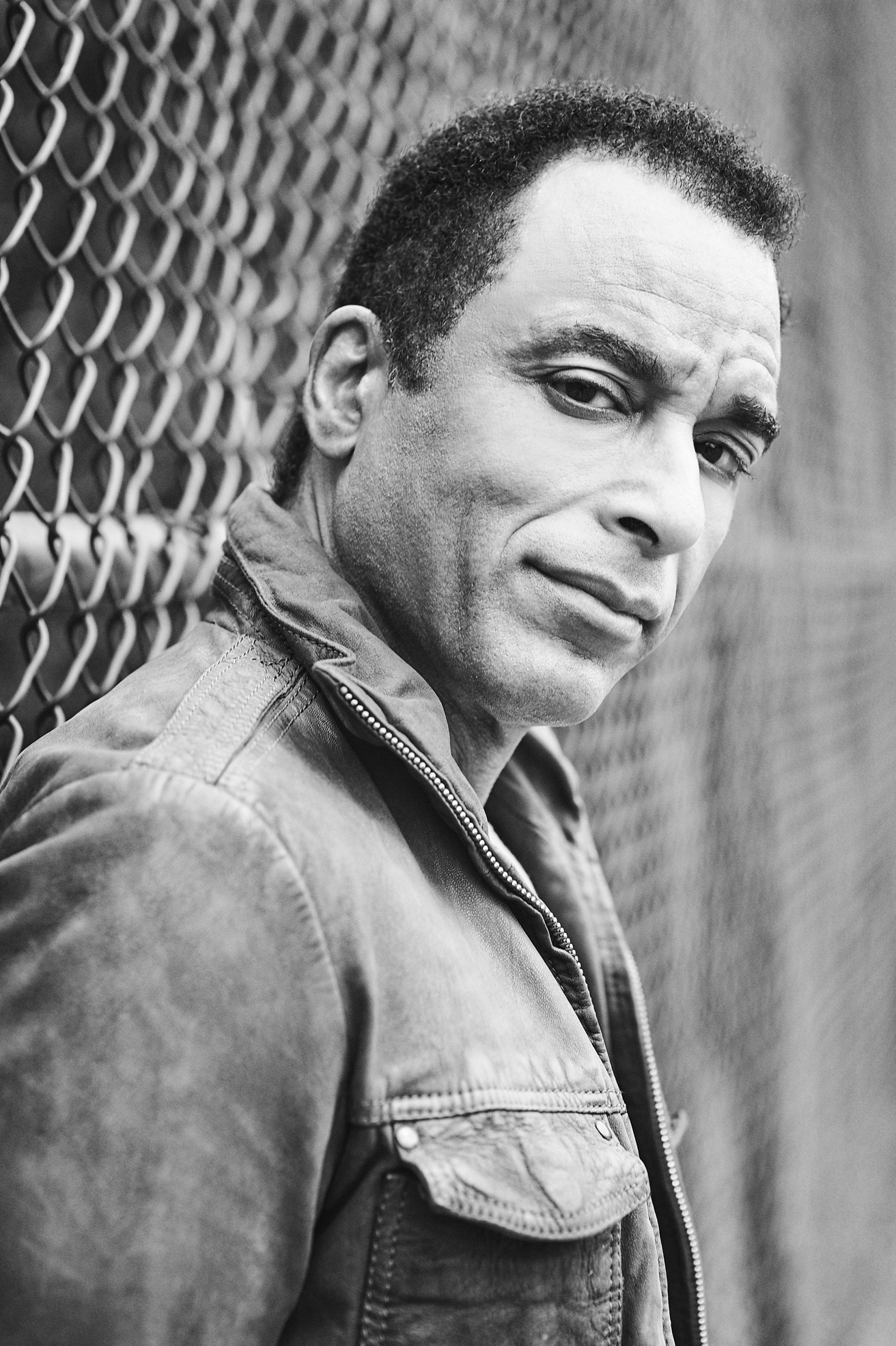
- Secada in 2017
- Born: Juan Francisco Secada Ramírez; October 4, 1961 (age 65); Havana, Cuba
- Education: University of Miami
- Occupations: Singer; songwriter; actor; record producer
- Years active: 1991–present
- Spouses: Jo Pat Cafro (m. 1988; div. 1993) Maritere Vilar (m. 1997)
- Children: 2
- Musical career
- Origin: Miami, Florida, U.S.
- Genres: Pop; Latin; Latin pop; R&B; funk; pop rock
- Instrument: Vocals
- Labels: SBK; EMI; 550
- Website: www.jonsecada.com

Juan Francisco Secada Ramírez (born October 4, 1961), better known as Jon Secada, is a Cuban-American singer. He has won two Grammy Awards and sold 15 million records, making him one of the best-selling Latin music artists. His music fuses funk, soul music, pop, and Latin percussion.

Secada has written songs for Gloria Estefan, Ricky Martin, and Jennifer Lopez. He has toured with Luciano Pavarotti and recorded duets with Jim Brickman, Olivia Newton-John, and Frank Sinatra.

Secada has performed several times at A Capitol Fourth, an annual Independence Day concert from the United States Capitol.

== Early life ==
Secada was born in 1961 in Havana, Cuba. Secada's father, José, was incarcerated for three years as a political prisoner by the communist Cuban government. In 1971, the Secadas received permission to emigrate and moved to Miami. His parents opened a coffee shop. Secada was raised in Hialeah, Florida.

== Education ==
In 1979, Secada graduated from Hialeah Senior High School in Hialeah, Florida. During his performance of A Christmas Carol in 11th grade, he says he realized his musical potential and was encouraged by teachers to pursue music as a career.

After graduating from high school, Secada attended the Frost School of Music at the University of Miami, where he received a Bachelor of Music in 1983 and a Master of Music in jazz vocal performance in 1986. He graduated cum laude and was later inducted into the Iron Arrow Honor Society, the highest honor bestowed by the University of Miami.

== Career ==
Secada performing at the 1999 Mayor's Ball in Miami-Dade County

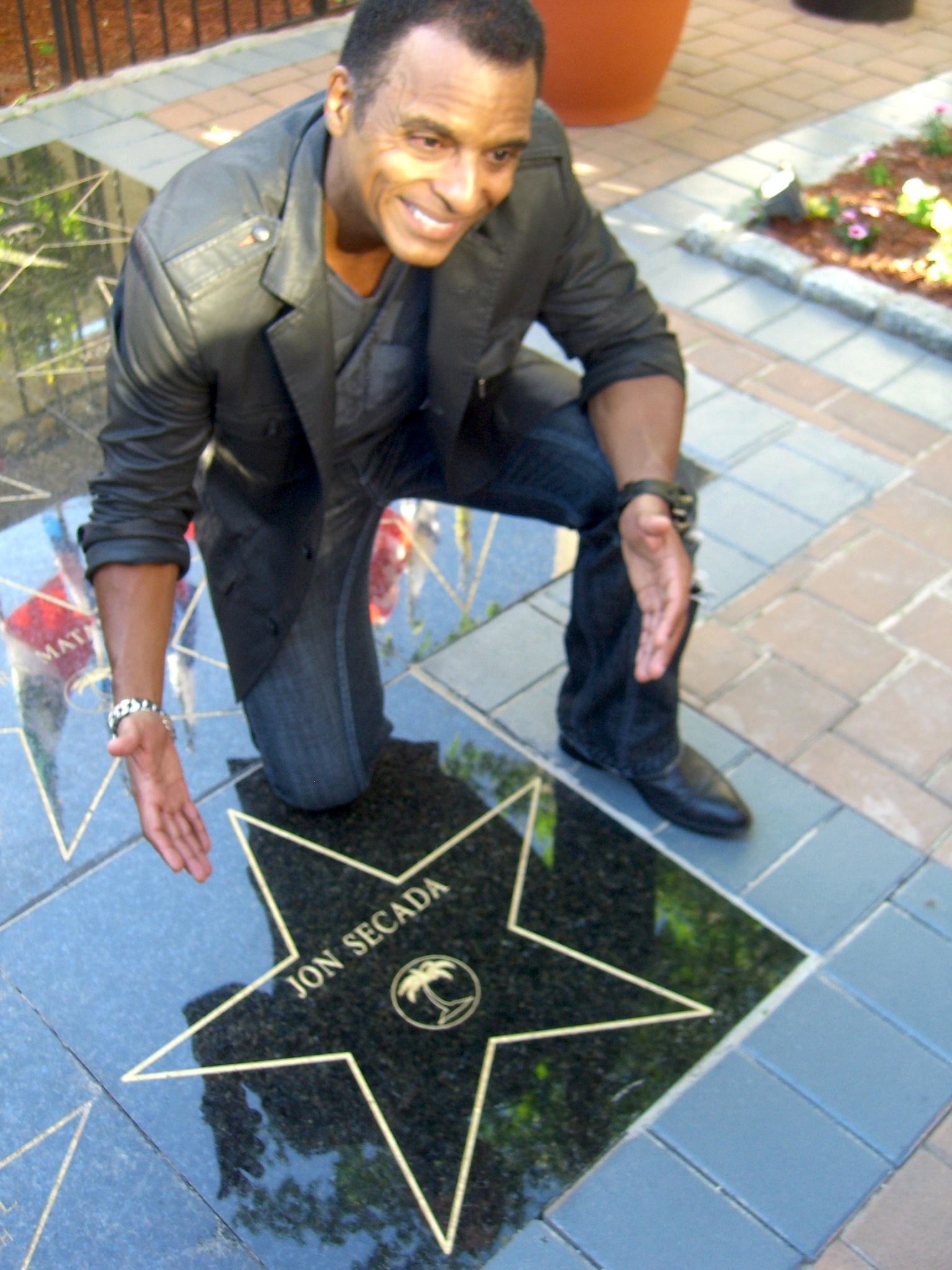
Jon Secada with his star on the Celia Cruz Plaza Walk of Fame in Union City, New Jersey, in 2011

From 1986 to 1991, Secada was a teacher at Miami Dade College.

In 1986, Secada's University of Miami acquaintances introduced him to Emilio Estefan, a musician in Miami Sound Machine and husband of Gloria Estefan. Estefan listened to one of Secada's demos and then became Secada's mentor and manager. This led to Secada becoming a backup singer for Miami Sound Machine.

In 1991, Secada co-wrote and was a backup singer for "Coming Out of the Dark", a number-one hit song inspired by a tour bus accident involving Gloria Estefan in 1990, in which her back was broken. In 1992, he released his self-titled debut album, which sold 7 million copies. In 1994, he performed a duet with Frank Sinatra, a re-recording of "The Best Is Yet to Come", released on Sinatra's album Duets II. He also performed at the awards for Miss Venezuela 1994. In 1995, he performed on Broadway in Grease, and he also presented at the 49th Tony Awards. He also recorded "If I Never Knew You", a duet with Shanice for Pocahontas. In 1999, he co-wrote and co-produced "She's All I Ever Had" for Ricky Martin.

In 2003, he performed in Cabaret. He also co-wrote "Juramento" for Ricky Martin. From 2006 to 2009, Secada was a judge on Latin American Idol. In 2007, he co-wrote three songs, and performed in one, on Lilian Garcia's album ¡Quiero Vivir!.

In 2017, he released a tribute album with cover versions of songs by Benny Moré.

In January 2025, Secada began teaching at the Wertheim School of Music of Florida International University.

== Personal life ==
From 1988 to 1993, Secada was married to Jo Pat Cafro. In February 1997, he married Maritere Vilar. The couple has two children.

Secada resides close to the University of Miami, his alma mater, in Coral Gables, Florida.

Secada has created the Jon Secada Music Scholarship at the University of Miami, raised funds for The Recording Academy's effort "Keeping Music in Schools", and supports many initiatives including the Pediatric AIDS Unit at Jackson Memorial Hospital, Make-A-Wish Foundation, and the Boys & Girls Clubs of America.

== Discography ==
- Jon Secada (1992)
- Otro Día Más Sin Verte (1992)
- Heart, Soul & a Voice (1994)
- Si Te Vas (1994)
- Amor (1995)
- Secada (1997)
- Better Part of Me (2000)
- The Gift (2001)
- Amanecer (2002)
- Same Dream (2005)
- A Christmas Fiesta/Una Fiesta Navideña (2007)
- Expressions (2009)
- Classics/Clasicos (2010)
- Otra Vez (2011)
- To Beny Moré with Love (2017)

== Awards and nominations ==
Award	Year	Nominee(s)	Category	Result	Ref.
ASCAP Latin Music Awards	2000	"Bella"	Most Performed Song	Won	
ASCAP Pop Music Awards	1992	"Coming Out of the Dark"	Most Performed Songs	Won	
ASCAP Pop Music Awards	1994	"Angel"	Most Performed Songs	Won	
ASCAP Pop Music Awards	1994	"Do You Believe in Us"	Most Performed Songs	Won	
ASCAP Pop Music Awards	1994	"Just Another Day"	Most Performed Songs	Won	
ASCAP Pop Music Awards	1995	"I'm Free"	Most Performed Songs	Won	
American Music Awards	1993	Himself	Favorite Adult Contemporary New Artist	Nominated	
BMI Latin Awards	1993	"Otro Día Más Sin Verte"	Song of the Year	Won	
BMI Latin Awards	2001	"Bella"	Award-Winning Song	Won	
BMI Pop Awards	1994	"Just Another Day"	Award-Winning Songs	Won	
BMI Pop Awards	1994	"Do You Believe in Us"	Award-Winning Songs	Won	
BMI Pop Awards	1994	"Angel"	Award-Winning Songs	Won	
BMI Pop Awards	1994	"I'm Free"	Award-Winning Songs	Won	
BMI Pop Awards	1996	"Mental Picture"	Award-Winning Songs	Won	
BMI Pop Awards	1996	"If You Go"	Award-Winning Songs	Won	
BMI Pop Awards	1998	"Too Late Too Soon"	Award-Winning Songs	Won	
BMI Pop Awards	2001	"She's All I Ever Had"	Award-Winning Songs	Won	
Billboard Music Awards	1993	Himself	Top Adult Contemporary Artist	Won	
Billboard Latin Music Awards	2001	"Así"	Latin Dance Club Play Track	Nominated	
Cash Box Year-End Awards	1994	"If You Go"	Top Pop Album	Nominated	
Grammy Awards	1993	Himself	Best New Artist	Nominated	
Grammy Awards	1993	Otro Día Más Sin Verte	Best Latin Pop Album	Won	
Grammy Awards	1996	Amor	Best Latin Pop Performance	Won	
Hit Awards (Hong Kong)	1993	Himself	Top Male Artist	Won	
Latin Grammy Awards	2017	To Beny Moré With Love	Best Traditional Tropical Album	Won	
Lo Nuestro Awards	1993	Himself	Male Artist of the Year, Pop	Won	
Lo Nuestro Awards	1993	Himself	New Pop Artist of the Year	Won	
Lo Nuestro Awards	1993	Jon Secada	Pop Album of the Year	Won	
Lo Nuestro Awards	1993	"Angel"	Pop Song of the Year	Nominated	
Lo Nuestro Awards	1993	"Otro Día Más Sin Verte"	Video of the Year	Nominated	
Lo Nuestro Awards	1994	Himself	Male Artist of the Year, Pop	Nominated	
Lo Nuestro Awards	1995	"Si Te Vas"	Video of the Year	Nominated	

Year	Award	Category	Work	Result	Ref.
1993	BMI Awards	Most Performed Latin Song	"Otro Día Más Sin Verte", "Sentir", and "Cree en Nuestra Amor" (Do You Believe in Us)	Won	
1993	The World Music Awards	Best-Selling Latin American Recording Artist	Himself	Won	
1993	The Caribbean Music Awards	Best New Latin Pop Album	Otro Día Más Sin Verte	Won	
1993	Billboard Latin Music Awards	Best Latin-Pop Album of the Year	Otro Día Más Sin Verte	Won	
1993	Billboard Latin Music Awards	Best Latin-Pop Artist	Himself	Won	
1993	Billboard Latin Music Awards	Best New Latin-Pop Artist of the Year	Himself	Won	
1993	Rolling Stone Magazine	Best Male Vocalist	Himself	Won	
1994	Asian Music Awards	Best Pop Song	"Mental Picture"	Won	

== Television series ==
- Alice's Wonderland Bakery as King of Hearts

== See also ==
- List of Afro-Latinos
- List of best-selling Latin music artists
