= Macarena Mix =

Compilation album by Various artists
- Released: June 27, 1995
- Genre: Latin pop; dance
- Length: 45:47
- Label: RCA

Various artists chronology
Macarena Mix (1995)	Macarena Non Stop (1996)

Macarena Mix is a compilation album released on June 27, 1995. It includes covers from popular dance songs of the 1990s and three versions of the monumental hit "Macarena" by Los del Río. The album peaked at number one on the Billboard Top Latin Albums chart for four non-consecutive weeks in 1996.

== Track listing ==
Track listing from Billboard.

No.	Title	Writer(s)	Performer	Length
1.	"Macarena"	Antonio Romero Monge; Rafael Ruíz	Los del Río	5:05
2.	"Te Informo"	Edmond Leary; Darrin O'Brien; Shawn Moltke	Sandalo	6:05
3.	"La Señal"	Joker	Sandalo	4:13
4.	"Amigos Para Siempre"	Don Black; Andrew Lloyd Webber	Los Manolos	4:24
5.	"Macarena (Bay Side Boyz Mix)"	Romero; Ruíz	Los del Río	3:53
6.	"All My Loving"	John Lennon; Paul McCartney	Los Manolos	3:12
7.	"Una Aventura"	Jairo Varela	Los Manolos	3:48
8.	"Ritmo de la Noche"	Castioni; Lagonda; Wycombe	The Sacados	4:59
9.	"Pedro Navaja"	Rubén Blades	El Lupe	4:48
10.	"Macarena (Extended)"	Romero; Ruíz	Los del Río	5:35

== Personnel ==
Adapted from AllMusic.

- Jesus Bola – arranger, musical direction
- Manuel Soler – arranger, musical direction
- Los del Río – performer
- Los Manolos – performer
- Sandalo – performer

== Charts ==
Chart (1995–1996)	Peak position
US Billboard 200	86
US Billboard Top Latin Albums	1
US Billboard Latin Pop Albums	1

== See also ==
- List of number-one Billboard Top Latin Albums from the 1990s
- List of number-one Billboard Latin Pop Albums from the 1990s
