= Auzaar =

- Poster
- Directed by: Sohail Khan
- Written by: Anwar Khan
- Produced by: Kumar S. Taurani; Ramesh Taurani
- Starring: Salman Khan; Sanjay Kapoor; Shilpa Shetty
- Cinematography: Kaka Thakur
- Edited by: A. Muthu
- Music by: Anu Malik
- Production company: Tips Industries
- Release date: 28 February 1997
- Running time: 136 minutes
- Country: India
- Language: Hindi
- Budget: ₹5.25 crore
- Box office: ₹10.37 crore

Auzaar (transl. Tool) is a 1997 Indian Hindi-language action thriller film directed by Sohail Khan and written by Anwar Khan. The film stars Salman Khan, Sanjay Kapoor and Shilpa Shetty. The film was released on 28 February 1997, and grossed ₹10.37 crore (equivalent to ₹58 crore or US$6.0 million in 2026) against a production budget of ₹5.25 crore (equivalent to ₹29 crore or US$3.0 million in 2026).

== Plot ==
Suraj and Yash were best friends in college, and Prarthana is the latter's college sweetheart. Yash's father, Thakur, is a gangster who had a rivalry with another gangster, Bhaiji. Yash always hated his father's business, although he loved his father. The friends almost had an unbreakable bond, but after Bhaiji's henchmen attack Thakur, Yash loses control and kills Bhaiji, the man responsible, leading to a separation between Suraj and Yash.

Yash turned into a gangster after learning that his father is disabled, but he also had more ethics than his father. He even married Prarthana, despite the latter knowing what he is. Yash also has a rivalry with a new gangster, Baba, Bhaiji's psychotic son, who wants to avenge his father's death. Yash never forgot his friendship either. Suraj, who is now a police officer, busts down a fake tourist group and a drugs and arms smuggling gang and nabs Thakur Jai Singh, a mastermind behind these. Suraj discovers that Yash runs an illegal business. He must now convince Yash to make his father mend his ways or face criticism from his superiors for not confronting him. Yash later meets Suraj, and they rekindle their friendship. Baba and his accomplice, Inspector Bhudev, have a discussion with each other and think about overpowering Yash, while the former also learns about Suraj's return from one of his henchmen.

Prarthana gets abducted by Baba's henchmen, but Suraj rescues her anyway. Finally, the police arrive on the spot despite Suraj failing to nab the criminals; he eventually shows his identity card to the police. When Prarthana learns of his identity and mission, he reveals the truth, also indicating someone else is blaming Yash through the illegal activities; she decides to help him either way. After a night out at a restaurant, Baba's henchmen have a scuffle with the friends, but Suraj's purse falls down during the scuffle, and Prarthana helps him retrieve it; Baba's henchmen are arrested by the police.

While trying to bail out Baba's henchmen, Bhudev learns that Suraj is a police officer after Suraj has an argument with him over his wristwatch, which was too costly for an officer to afford. He then reveals it to Baba as well as Thakur. Thakur also reveals to Yash that Suraj had betrayed him. Yash breaks ties with Suraj and Prarthana, who knew what Suraj was but didn't reveal the truth. Thakur mysteriously planned to kill Suraj, but the latter fights back and tries to reveal Thakur's real agenda. Suraj does so by firing at him, while Yash tries to stop him from doing so. Suddenly, Thakur stands up on his feet. It is revealed that Thakur faked his illness to turn Yash into a gangster like him, making Yash feel betrayed by his father. Unintentionally losing his friend and wife, he decides to surrender to the police. Before Yash is arrested, he receives a phone call and learns that Prarthana has been kidnapped. Now reunited, Yash and Suraj rescue Prarthana and take down Baba and his henchmen, as well as Thakur Jai Singh.

Inspector Bhudev, who later becomes honest and leaves Baba's side, apprehends Thakur Jai Singh. Suraj stops Yash from killing Baba, and Yash leaves him for the sake of their friendship. Bhudev tries to arrest Baba, who later snatches the former's service revolver and tries to kill Suraj and Yash, despite being handcuffed. Along with Yash, Suraj had to shoot down Baba multiple times, leading to his demise. In the end, Yash, Prarthana, and Suraj finally walk out of his den, although Yash finally surrenders himself to the police.

== Cast ==
- Sanjay Kapoor as Yash Thakur, Prarthana's husband.
- Salman Khan as CBI Officer Suraj Prakash
- Shilpa Shetty as Prarthana Thakur, Yash's wife.
- Nirmal Pandey as Baba, the main antagonist.
- Johnny Lever as Peter
- Kiran Kumar as Bhaiji
- Aashif Sheikh as Inspector Bhudev
- Paresh Rawal as Mr. Thakur, Yash's father.
- Ila Arun as herself in the song "Apni To Ek Hi Life"
- Vishwajeet Pradhan as Baba's Associate
- Arun Bakshi as Arun Bhai
- Achyut Potdar as Ahmed
- Vikas Anand as Doctor Mohan Dhupia
- Tiku Talsania as College Professor Narayan Singh
- Mukesh Rawal as Thakur's Associate
- Jeetu Verma as Thakur Jai Singh, a criminal
- Dinesh Hingoo as Qawwal Singer Laal in song "Apni To Ek Hi Life"
- Joginder Shelly as Truck driver Hakim Singh in song "Apni To Ek Hi Life"
- Sulabha Arya as Rekha
- Pinky Chinoy as an item number in the song "Dil Le Le Lena"

== Production ==
Sohail Khan initially wanted Aamir Khan for Sanjay Kapoor's role, but he declined it for unknown reasons. Then Sohail Khan approached Suniel Shetty for the role, but he was busy shooting another film. Raveena Tandon was offered the female lead, but declined; then Shilpa Shetty received the role.

== Soundtrack ==
Auzaar

Soundtrack album by Anu Malik
- Released: January 1997
- Recorded: 1996
- Genre: Bollywood film soundtrack
- Length: 42:35
- Label: Tips
- Producer: Anu Malik

Anu Malik chronology
Border (1997)	Auzaar (1997)	Dil Kitna Nadan Hai (1997)

The film's soundtrack album was composed by Anu Malik.

The song "I Love You, I Love You" was reportedly plagiarized from Pakistani Qawwali singer Nusrat Fateh Ali Khan's "Allah Hoo, Allah Hoo". Khan was reportedly aggrieved when Malik turned his spiritual "Allah Hoo, Allah Hoo" into "I Love You, I Love You". Khan said "He has taken my devotional song Allahu and converted it into I love you. He should at least respect my religious songs."

Even "Dil Le Le Lena" was also plagiarized from the song "Macarena", the opening theme of Los Del Rio's album A mí me gusta (1993).

#	Song	Singer(s)	Lyricist
1.	"Thahara Hai Yeh Sama"	Kumar Sanu, Alka Yagnik	Rahat Indori
2.	"I Love You I Love You"	Shankar Mahadevan	Rahat Indori
3.	"Tujhe Khas Fursat Mein"	Kumar Sanu, Udit Narayan, Chandana Dixit	Qateel Shifai
4.	"Dil Ke Sau Tukde"	Kumar Sanu, Alka Yagnik	Indeevar
5.	"Hum Aur Tum Aur Yeh Shaam"	Anu Malik, Remo Fernandes, Alka Yagnik	Rahat Indori
6.	"Dil Le Le Lena"	Abhijeet, Anu Malik, Jojo, Anamika	Anu Malik
7.	"Masti Ka Aalam Aaya Hai"	Gurdaas Maan, Ila Arun, Sabri Brothers	Ila Arun
