= List of Billboard Latin Pop Albums number ones from the 1990s =

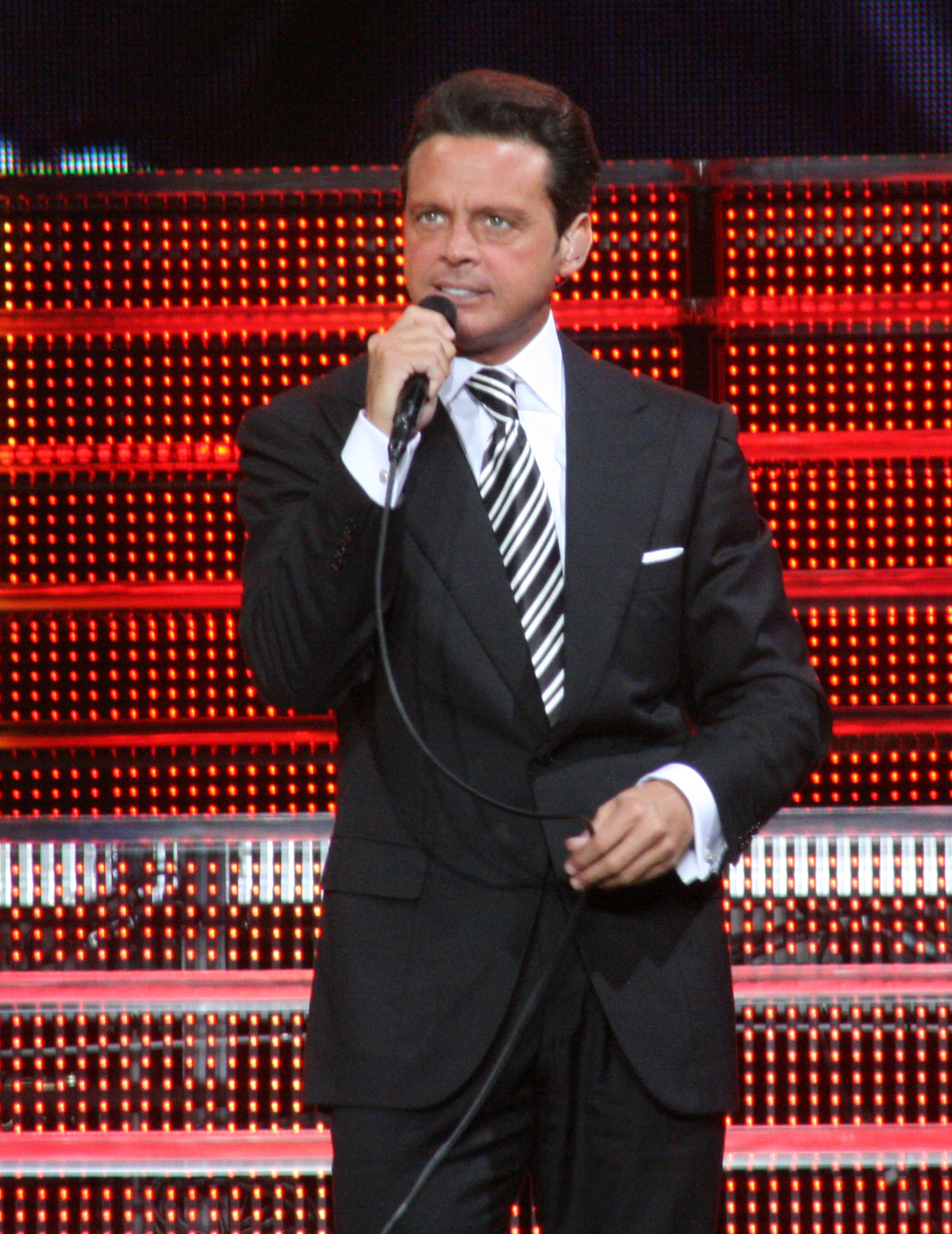
Luis Miguel (pictured in 2008) had the most number one albums of the 1990s with a total of six records.

Latin Pop Albums is a chart that ranks the best-selling Latin pop albums in the United States. Since its inception, the chart had been published on a fortnightly basis with its positions being compiled by sales data from Latin music retailers and distributors. The methodology for the chart was amended with the effect from the week of July 10, 1993, to have its sales compiled by Nielsen SoundScan, basing it on electronic point of sale data. At the same time, the chart began to be published weekly and became a sub chart of Top Latin Albums (which was established in the same week as the methodology change). Billboard also imposed a linguistic rule requiring an album to have 70% of its content in Spanish (later reduced to 50%) to be eligible to rank on the chart.

The first number one of the decade was Tierra de Nadie (1988) by Ana Gabriel, which had been in the top spot since the issue dated November 18, 1989. Ana Gabriel was also the female artist with the most number-one records of the 1990s with Quién como tú (1989), En Vivo (1990), and Silueta (1992). She had the bestselling Latin pop album of 1991 with En Vivo. Other female acts to reach number one on the chart in the 1990s included Vikki Carr, Gloria Estefan, Myriam Hernández, Daniela Romo, Selena, Shakira, and Olga Tañón. Selena had the longest-running number one of the decade with her posthumous studio album Dreaming of You (1995) with 44 weeks. It also topped the Billboard 200 chart, becoming the first predominately Spanish-language album to do so and remains the best-selling Latin album in the US of all-time as of December 2020.

Alejandro Fernández, Enrique Iglesias, Ricky Martin, and Luis Miguel, dubbed by the Los Angeles Times critic Ernesto Lechner as among "Latin Pop’s Golden Boys", all topped the Latin Pop Albums chart in the 1990s. Luis Miguel had the most number one albums of the decade. His album Romance (1991) was credited with reviving mainstream interest in the bolero genre, and spent 16 weeks at the apex of the chart. His follow-up bolero albums Segundo Romance (1994) and Romances (1997) also reached number one and all three albums were certified platinum by the Recording Industry Association of America (RIAA). The Romance-themed albums were followed by his pop albums: Aries (1993), Nada Es Igual... (1996), and Amarte Es un Placer (1999), the latter being the final number one record of the decade. Me Estoy Enamorando by Fernández and Vuelve by Martin were the best-selling Latin albums of 1998 and 1999, respectively, and were both certified platinum by the RIAA.

Two albums related to the song "Macarena" hit the top spot of the chart: Macarena Non Stop (1996) by Los del Río and Macarena Mix (1995), a compilation album with music by Sandalo, Manolos, El Lupe and The Sacados, to capitalize on the song's popularity. It would be Los del Río's only number one album on the chart. Three predominately non-Spanish-language albums topped the chart: Lambada (1989) by Kaoma, Jon Secada's self-titled album (1992), and Supernatural (1999) by Santana. Although Supernatural topped the chart in the week of July 3, 1999, it was removed the week following its debut after Billboard determined the album did not meet the linguistic requirement.

== Chart history ==
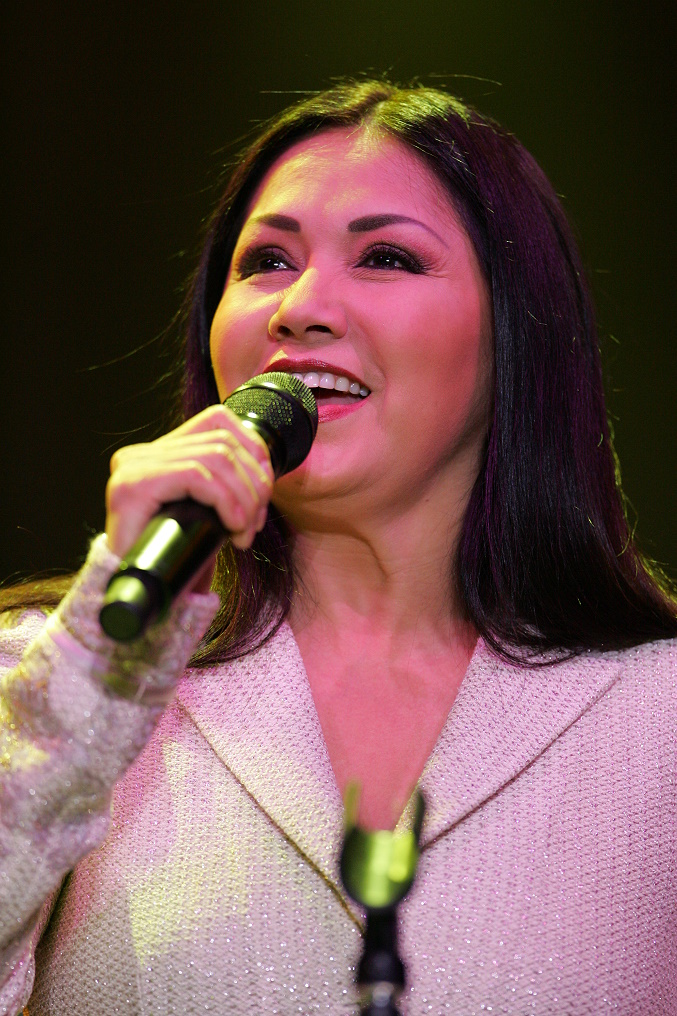
Ana Gabriel (pictured in 2006) was the female act with the most number ones of the decade with four albums

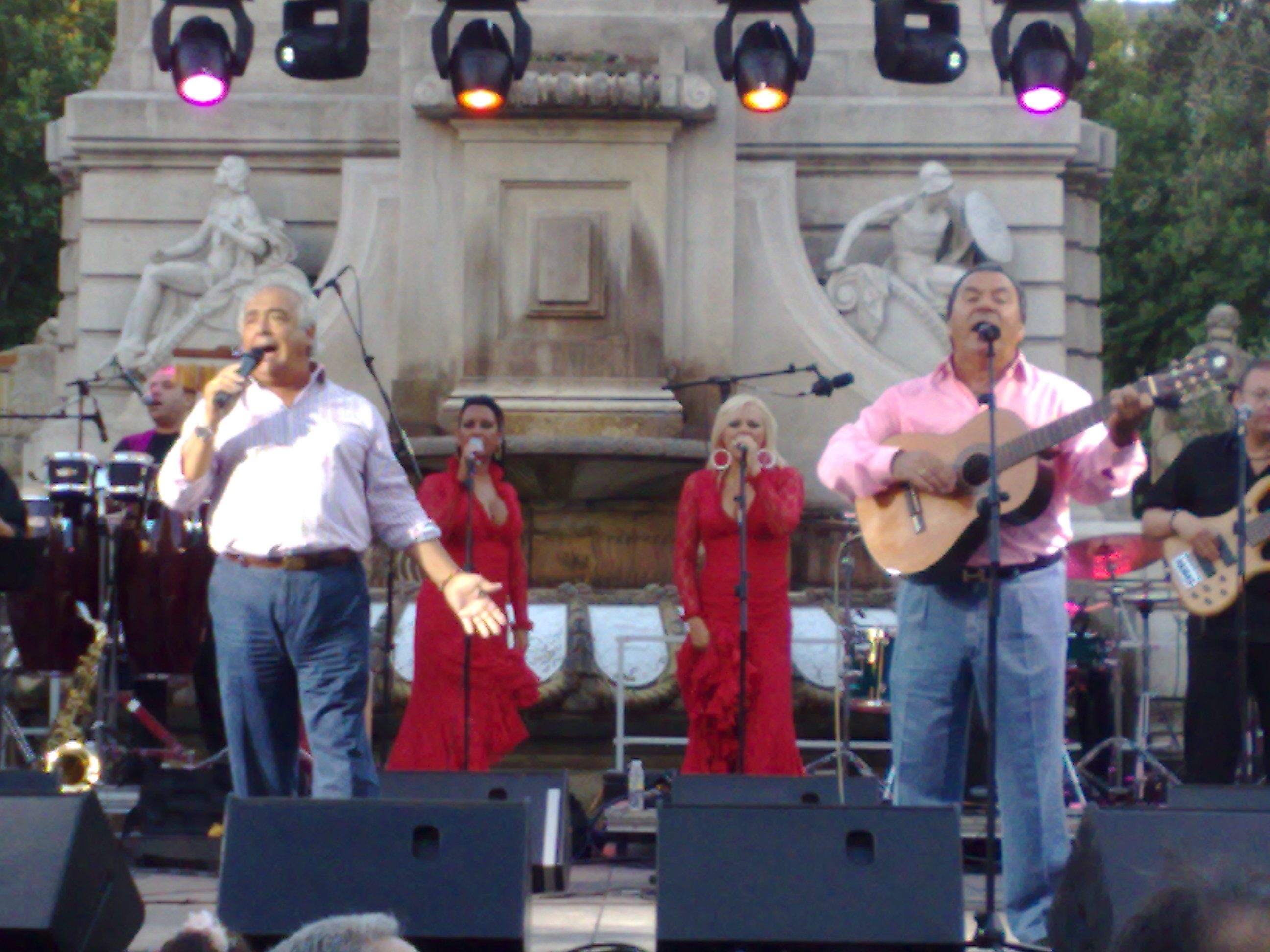
Los del Río (pictured in 2009) achieved their only number one on the chart

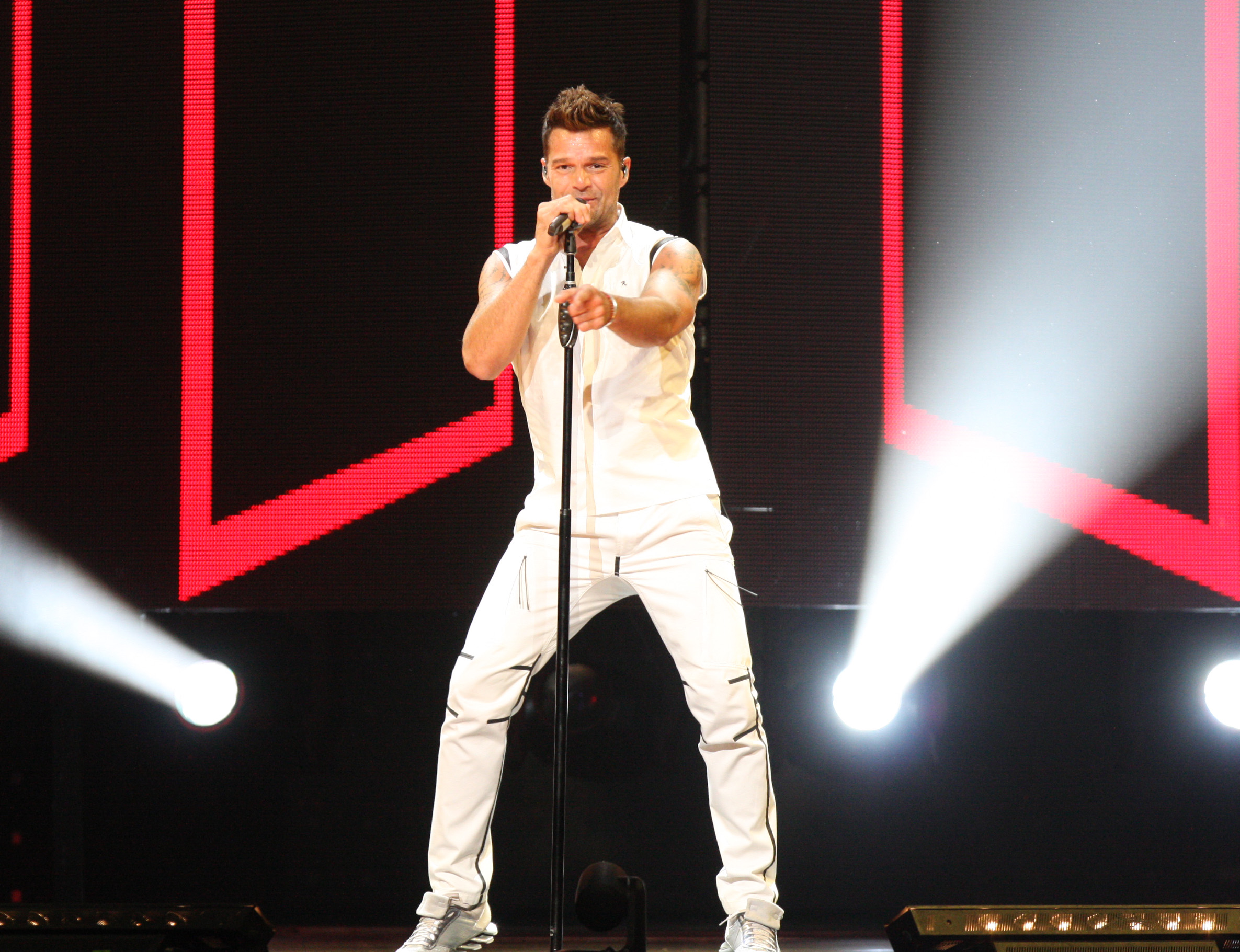
Ricky Martin (pictured in 2015) had the best-selling Latin pop album of 1999.

Key
†	Indicates the number one on Billboard's year-end Latin pop albums chart

Chart history
Issue date	Album	Artist(s)	Ref.
January 13, 1990	Tierra de Nadie	Ana Gabriel	
January 27, 1990	Tierra de Nadie	Ana Gabriel	
February 10, 1990	Tierra de Nadie	Ana Gabriel	
February 24, 1990	Lambada	Kaoma	
March 10, 1990	Lambada	Kaoma	
March 24, 1990	Lambada	Kaoma	
April 7, 1990	Lambada	Kaoma	
April 21, 1990	Lambada	Kaoma	
May 5, 1990	Lambada	Kaoma	
May 19, 1990	Quién Como Tú	Ana Gabriel	
June 2, 1990	Quién Como Tú	Ana Gabriel	
June 16, 1990	Quién Como Tú	Ana Gabriel	
June 30, 1990	Quién Como Tú	Ana Gabriel	
July 14, 1990	Quién Como Tú	Ana Gabriel	
July 28, 1990	Quiero Amanecer con Alguien †	Daniela Romo	
August 11, 1990	Quiero Amanecer con Alguien †	Daniela Romo	
August 25, 1990	Quiero Amanecer con Alguien †	Daniela Romo	
September 8, 1990	Quién Como Tú	Ana Gabriel	
September 22, 1990	Quién Como Tú	Ana Gabriel	
October 6, 1990	Quiero Amanecer con Alguien †	Daniela Romo	
October 20, 1990	Quiero Amanecer con Alguien †	Daniela Romo	
November 3, 1990	Dos	Myriam Hernández	
November 17, 1990	Dos	Myriam Hernández	
December 1, 1990	Dos	Myriam Hernández	
December 15, 1990	Éxitos de Gloria Estefan	Gloria Estefan	
December 29, 1990	Éxitos de Gloria Estefan	Gloria Estefan	
January 12, 1991	Dos	Myriam Hernández	
January 26, 1991	Dos	Myriam Hernández	
February 9, 1991	Dos	Myriam Hernández	
February 23, 1991	Dos	Myriam Hernández	
March 9, 1991	En Vivo †	Ana Gabriel	
March 23, 1991	Dos	Myriam Hernández	
April 6, 1991	En Vivo †	Ana Gabriel	
April 20, 1991	En Vivo †	Ana Gabriel	
May 4, 1991	En Vivo †	Ana Gabriel	
May 18, 1991	En Vivo †	Ana Gabriel	
June 1, 1991	En Vivo †	Ana Gabriel	
June 15, 1991	En Vivo †	Ana Gabriel	
June 29, 1991	En Vivo †	Ana Gabriel	
July 13, 1991	En Vivo †	Ana Gabriel	
July 27, 1991	Amada Más Que Nunca	Daniela Romo	
August 10, 1991	Amada Más Que Nunca	Daniela Romo	
August 24, 1991	Amada Más Que Nunca	Daniela Romo	
September 7, 1991	Amada Más Que Nunca	Daniela Romo	
September 21, 1991	Amada Más Que Nunca	Daniela Romo	
October 5, 1991	Cosas del Amor	Vikki Carr	
October 19, 1991	Cosas del Amor	Vikki Carr	
November 2, 1991	Cosas del Amor	Vikki Carr	
November 16, 1991	Cosas del Amor	Vikki Carr	
November 30, 1991	Amada Más Que Nunca	Daniela Romo	
December 14, 1991	Amada Más Que Nunca	Daniela Romo	
December 28, 1991	Amada Más Que Nunca	Daniela Romo	
January 11, 1992	Romance †	Luis Miguel	
January 25, 1992	Romance †	Luis Miguel	
February 8, 1992	Romance †	Luis Miguel	
February 22, 1992	Romance †	Luis Miguel	
March 7, 1992	Romance †	Luis Miguel	
March 21, 1992	Romance †	Luis Miguel	
April 4, 1992	Romance †	Luis Miguel	
April 18, 1992	Romance †	Luis Miguel	
May 2, 1992	Romance †	Luis Miguel	
May 16, 1992	Romance †	Luis Miguel	
May 30, 1992	Romance †	Luis Miguel	
June 13, 1992	Romance †	Luis Miguel	
June 27, 1992	Romance †	Luis Miguel	
July 11, 1992	Romance †	Luis Miguel	
July 25, 1992	Romance †	Luis Miguel	
August 8, 1992	Romance †	Luis Miguel	
August 22, 1992	Jon Secada	Jon Secada	
September 5, 1992	Jon Secada	Jon Secada	
September 19, 1992	Jon Secada	Jon Secada	
October 3, 1992	Jon Secada	Jon Secada	
October 17, 1992	Jon Secada	Jon Secada	
October 31, 1992	Jon Secada	Jon Secada	
November 14, 1992	Silueta	Ana Gabriel	
November 28, 1992	Jon Secada	Jon Secada	
December 12, 1992	Jon Secada	Jon Secada	
December 26, 1992	Jon Secada	Jon Secada	
January 9, 1993	Jon Secada	Jon Secada	
January 23, 1993	Jon Secada	Jon Secada	
February 6, 1993	Jon Secada	Jon Secada	
February 20, 1993	Jon Secada	Jon Secada	
March 6, 1993	Jon Secada	Jon Secada	
March 20, 1993	Jon Secada	Jon Secada	
April 3, 1993	Jon Secada	Jon Secada	
April 17, 1993	Jon Secada	Jon Secada	
May 1, 1993	Jon Secada	Jon Secada	
May 15, 1993	Jon Secada	Jon Secada	
May 29, 1993	Jon Secada	Jon Secada	
June 12, 1993	Jon Secada	Jon Secada	
June 26, 1993	Jon Secada	Jon Secada	
July 10, 1993	Mi Tierra	Gloria Estefan	
July 17, 1993	Aries	Luis Miguel	
July 24, 1993	Aries	Luis Miguel	
July 31, 1993	Aries	Luis Miguel	
August 7, 1993	Aries	Luis Miguel	
August 14, 1993	Aries	Luis Miguel	
August 21, 1993	Aries	Luis Miguel	
August 28, 1993	Aries	Luis Miguel	
September 4, 1993	Aries	Luis Miguel	
September 11, 1993	Aries	Luis Miguel	
September 18, 1993	Aries	Luis Miguel	
September 25, 1993	Aries	Luis Miguel	
October 2, 1993	Aries	Luis Miguel	
October 9, 1993	Aries	Luis Miguel	
October 16, 1993	Aries	Luis Miguel	
October 23, 1993	Aries	Luis Miguel	
October 30, 1993	Aries	Luis Miguel	
November 6, 1993	Aries	Luis Miguel	
November 13, 1993	Aries	Luis Miguel	
November 20, 1993	Aries	Luis Miguel	
November 27, 1993	Love and Liberté	Gipsy Kings	
December 4, 1993	Love and Liberté	Gipsy Kings	
December 11, 1993	Love and Liberté	Gipsy Kings	
December 18, 1993	Love and Liberté	Gipsy Kings	
December 25, 1993	Love and Liberté	Gipsy Kings	
January 1, 1994	Love and Liberté	Gipsy Kings	
January 8, 1994	Love and Liberté	Gipsy Kings	
January 15, 1994	Love and Liberté	Gipsy Kings	
January 22, 1994	Love and Liberté	Gipsy Kings	
January 29, 1994	Love and Liberté	Gipsy Kings	
February 5, 1994	Love and Liberté	Gipsy Kings	
February 12, 1994	Love and Liberté	Gipsy Kings	
February 19, 1994	Love and Liberté	Gipsy Kings	
February 26, 1994	Love and Liberté	Gipsy Kings	
March 5, 1994	Love and Liberté	Gipsy Kings	
March 12, 1994	Love and Liberté	Gipsy Kings	
March 19, 1994	Love and Liberté	Gipsy Kings	
March 26, 1994	Love and Liberté	Gipsy Kings	
April 2, 1994	Love and Liberté	Gipsy Kings	
April 9, 1994	Love and Liberté	Gipsy Kings	
April 16, 1994	Love and Liberté	Gipsy Kings	
April 23, 1994	Vida	La Mafia	
April 30, 1994	Vida	La Mafia	
May 7, 1994	Vida	La Mafia	
May 14, 1994	Vida	La Mafia	
May 21, 1994	Vida	La Mafia	
May 28, 1994	Vida	La Mafia	
June 4, 1994	Vida	La Mafia	
June 11, 1994	Love and Liberté	Gipsy Kings	
June 18, 1994	Vida	La Mafia	
June 25, 1994	Vida	La Mafia	
July 2, 1994	Vida	La Mafia	
July 9, 1994	Vida	La Mafia	
July 16, 1994	Love and Liberté	Gipsy Kings	
July 23, 1994	Piano de América 2	Raúl Di Blasio	
July 30, 1994	Piano de América 2	Raúl Di Blasio	
August 6, 1994	Vida	La Mafia	
August 13, 1994	Piano de América 2	Raúl Di Blasio	
August 20, 1994	Piano de América 2	Raúl Di Blasio	
August 27, 1994	Piano de América 2	Raúl Di Blasio	
September 3, 1994	Piano de América 2	Raúl Di Blasio	
September 10, 1994	Piano de América 2	Raúl Di Blasio	
September 17, 1994	Segundo Romance †	Luis Miguel	
September 24, 1994	Segundo Romance †	Luis Miguel	
October 1, 1994	Segundo Romance †	Luis Miguel	
October 8, 1994	Segundo Romance †	Luis Miguel	
October 15, 1994	Segundo Romance †	Luis Miguel	
October 22, 1994	Segundo Romance †	Luis Miguel	
October 29, 1994	Segundo Romance †	Luis Miguel	
November 5, 1994	Segundo Romance †	Luis Miguel	
November 12, 1994	Segundo Romance †	Luis Miguel	
November 19, 1994	Segundo Romance †	Luis Miguel	
November 26, 1994	Segundo Romance †	Luis Miguel	
December 3, 1994	Segundo Romance †	Luis Miguel	
December 10, 1994	Segundo Romance †	Luis Miguel	
December 17, 1994	Segundo Romance †	Luis Miguel	
December 24, 1994	Segundo Romance †	Luis Miguel	
December 31, 1994	Segundo Romance †	Luis Miguel	
January 7, 1995	Segundo Romance †	Luis Miguel	
January 14, 1995	Segundo Romance †	Luis Miguel	
January 21, 1995	Segundo Romance †	Luis Miguel	
January 28, 1995	Segundo Romance †	Luis Miguel	
February 4, 1995	Segundo Romance †	Luis Miguel	
February 11, 1995	Segundo Romance †	Luis Miguel	
February 18, 1995	Segundo Romance †	Luis Miguel	
February 25, 1995	Segundo Romance †	Luis Miguel	
March 4, 1995	Segundo Romance †	Luis Miguel	
March 11, 1995	Segundo Romance †	Luis Miguel	
March 18, 1995	Segundo Romance †	Luis Miguel	
March 25, 1995	Éxitos En Vivo	La Mafia	
April 1, 1995	Segundo Romance	Luis Miguel	
April 8, 1995	Segundo Romance	Luis Miguel	
April 15, 1995	The Best of the Gipsy Kings	Gipsy Kings	
April 22, 1995	The Best of the Gipsy Kings	Gipsy Kings	
April 29, 1995	The Best of the Gipsy Kings	Gipsy Kings	
May 6, 1995	The Best of the Gipsy Kings	Gipsy Kings	
May 13, 1995	The Best of the Gipsy Kings	Gipsy Kings	
May 20, 1995	The Best of the Gipsy Kings	Gipsy Kings	
May 27, 1995	The Best of the Gipsy Kings	Gipsy Kings	
June 3, 1995	The Best of the Gipsy Kings	Gipsy Kings	
June 10, 1995	The Best of the Gipsy Kings	Gipsy Kings	
June 17, 1995	The Best of the Gipsy Kings	Gipsy Kings	
June 24, 1995	The Best of the Gipsy Kings	Gipsy Kings	
July 1, 1995	The Best of the Gipsy Kings	Gipsy Kings	
July 8, 1995	The Best of the Gipsy Kings	Gipsy Kings	
July 15, 1995	The Best of the Gipsy Kings	Gipsy Kings	
July 22, 1995	The Best of the Gipsy Kings	Gipsy Kings	
July 29, 1995	The Best of the Gipsy Kings	Gipsy Kings	
August 5, 1995	Dreaming of You †	Selena	
August 12, 1995	Dreaming of You †	Selena	
August 19, 1995	Dreaming of You †	Selena	
August 26, 1995	Dreaming of You †	Selena	
September 2, 1995	Dreaming of You †	Selena	
September 9, 1995	Dreaming of You †	Selena	
September 16, 1995	Dreaming of You †	Selena	
September 23, 1995	Dreaming of You †	Selena	
September 30, 1995	Dreaming of You †	Selena	
October 7, 1995	Dreaming of You †	Selena	
October 14, 1995	Dreaming of You †	Selena	
October 21, 1995	Dreaming of You †	Selena	
October 28, 1995	Dreaming of You †	Selena	
November 4, 1995	Dreaming of You †	Selena	
November 11, 1995	Dreaming of You †	Selena	
November 18, 1995	Dreaming of You †	Selena	
November 25, 1995	Dreaming of You †	Selena	
December 2, 1995	Dreaming of You †	Selena	
December 9, 1995	Dreaming of You †	Selena	
December 16, 1995	Dreaming of You †	Selena	
December 23, 1995	Dreaming of You †	Selena	
December 30, 1995	Dreaming of You †	Selena	
January 6, 1996	Dreaming of You †	Selena	
January 13, 1996	Dreaming of You †	Selena	
January 20, 1996	Dreaming of You †	Selena	
January 27, 1996	Dreaming of You †	Selena	
February 3, 1996	Dreaming of You †	Selena	
February 10, 1996	Dreaming of You †	Selena	
February 17, 1996	Dreaming of You †	Selena	
February 24, 1996	Dreaming of You †	Selena	
March 2, 1996	Dreaming of You †	Selena	
March 9, 1996	Dreaming of You †	Selena	
March 16, 1996	Dreaming of You †	Selena	
March 23, 1996	Dreaming of You †	Selena	
March 30, 1996	Dreaming of You †	Selena	
April 6, 1996	Dreaming of You †	Selena	
April 13, 1996	Dreaming of You †	Selena	
April 20, 1996	Dreaming of You †	Selena	
April 27, 1996	Dreaming of You †	Selena	
May 4, 1996	Dreaming of You †	Selena	
May 11, 1996	Dreaming of You †	Selena	
May 18, 1996	Dreaming of You †	Selena	
May 25, 1996	Enrique Iglesias	Enrique Iglesias	
June 1, 1996	Enrique Iglesias	Enrique Iglesias	
June 8, 1996	Enrique Iglesias	Enrique Iglesias	
June 15, 1996	Enrique Iglesias	Enrique Iglesias	
June 22, 1996	Enrique Iglesias	Enrique Iglesias	
June 29, 1996	Enrique Iglesias	Enrique Iglesias	
July 6, 1996	Enrique Iglesias	Enrique Iglesias	
July 13, 1996	Enrique Iglesias	Enrique Iglesias	
July 20, 1996	Enrique Iglesias	Enrique Iglesias	
July 27, 1996	Enrique Iglesias	Enrique Iglesias	
August 3, 1996	Macarena Mix	Various artists	
August 10, 1996	Enrique Iglesias	Enrique Iglesias	
August 17, 1996	Macarena Mix	Various artists	
August 24, 1996	Macarena Mix	Various artists	
August 31, 1996	Macarena Mix	Various artists	
September 7, 1996	Nada Es Igual...	Luis Miguel	
September 14, 1996	Nada Es Igual...	Luis Miguel	
September 21, 1996	Macarena Non Stop	Los del Río	
September 28, 1996	Macarena Non Stop	Los del Río	
October 5, 1996	Macarena Non Stop	Los del Río	
October 12, 1996	Macarena Non Stop	Los del Río	
October 19, 1996	Macarena Non Stop	Los del Río	
October 26, 1996	Macarena Non Stop	Los del Río	
November 2, 1996	Macarena Non Stop	Los del Río	
November 9, 1996	Macarena Non Stop	Los del Río	
November 16, 1996	Macarena Non Stop	Los del Río	
November 23, 1996	Macarena Non Stop	Los del Río	
November 30, 1996	Macarena Non Stop	Los del Río	
December 7, 1996	Tango †	Julio Iglesias	
December 14, 1996	Tango †	Julio Iglesias	
December 21, 1996	Tango †	Julio Iglesias	
December 28, 1996	Tango †	Julio Iglesias	
January 4, 1997	Tango †	Julio Iglesias	
January 11, 1997	Tango †	Julio Iglesias	
January 18, 1997	Tango †	Julio Iglesias	
January 25, 1997	Tango †	Julio Iglesias	
February 1, 1997	Tango †	Julio Iglesias	
February 8, 1997	Tango †	Julio Iglesias	
February 15, 1997	Vivir	Enrique Iglesias	
February 22, 1997	Vivir	Enrique Iglesias	
March 1, 1997	Vivir	Enrique Iglesias	
March 8, 1997	Vivir	Enrique Iglesias	
March 15, 1997	Vivir	Enrique Iglesias	
March 22, 1997	Vivir	Enrique Iglesias	
March 29, 1997	Vivir	Enrique Iglesias	
April 5, 1997	Vivir	Enrique Iglesias	
April 12, 1997	Dreaming of You	Selena	
April 19, 1997	Vivir	Enrique Iglesias	
April 26, 1997	Vivir	Enrique Iglesias	
May 3, 1997	Vivir	Enrique Iglesias	
May 10, 1997	Vivir	Enrique Iglesias	
May 17, 1997	Vivir	Enrique Iglesias	
May 24, 1997	Juntos Otra Vez	Juan Gabriel and Rocío Dúrcal	
May 31, 1997	Vivir	Enrique Iglesias	
June 7, 1997	Vivir	Enrique Iglesias	
June 14, 1997	Vivir	Enrique Iglesias	
June 21, 1997	Vivir	Enrique Iglesias	
June 28, 1997	Vivir	Enrique Iglesias	
July 5, 1997	Vivir	Enrique Iglesias	
July 12, 1997	Vivir	Enrique Iglesias	
July 19, 1997	Vivir	Enrique Iglesias	
July 26, 1997	Vivir	Enrique Iglesias	
August 2, 1997	Vivir	Enrique Iglesias	
August 9, 1997	Vivir	Enrique Iglesias	
August 16, 1997	Vivir	Enrique Iglesias	
August 23, 1997	Romances	Luis Miguel	
August 30, 1997	Romances	Luis Miguel	
September 6, 1997	Romances	Luis Miguel	
September 13, 1997	Romances	Luis Miguel	
September 20, 1997	Romances	Luis Miguel	
September 27, 1997	Romances	Luis Miguel	
October 4, 1997	Romances	Luis Miguel	
October 11, 1997	Romances	Luis Miguel	
October 18, 1997	Romances	Luis Miguel	
October 25, 1997	Romances	Luis Miguel	
November 1, 1997	Sueños Líquidos	Maná	
November 8, 1997	Romances	Luis Miguel	
November 15, 1997	Romances	Luis Miguel	
November 22, 1997	Romances	Luis Miguel	
November 29, 1997	Me Estoy Enamorando †	Alejandro Fernández	
December 6, 1997	Me Estoy Enamorando †	Alejandro Fernández	
December 13, 1997	Me Estoy Enamorando †	Alejandro Fernández	
December 20, 1997	Me Estoy Enamorando †	Alejandro Fernández	
December 27, 1997	Me Estoy Enamorando †	Alejandro Fernández	
January 3, 1998	Me Estoy Enamorando †	Alejandro Fernández	
January 10, 1998	Me Estoy Enamorando †	Alejandro Fernández	
January 17, 1998	Me Estoy Enamorando †	Alejandro Fernández	
January 24, 1998	Me Estoy Enamorando †	Alejandro Fernández	
January 31, 1998	Me Estoy Enamorando †	Alejandro Fernández	
February 7, 1998	Me Estoy Enamorando †	Alejandro Fernández	
February 14, 1998	Me Estoy Enamorando †	Alejandro Fernández	
February 21, 1998	Me Estoy Enamorando †	Alejandro Fernández	
February 28, 1998	Vuelve	Ricky Martin	
March 7, 1998	Vuelve	Ricky Martin	
March 14, 1998	Vuelve	Ricky Martin	
March 21, 1998	Vuelve	Ricky Martin	
March 28, 1998	Vuelve	Ricky Martin	
April 4, 1998	Vuelve	Ricky Martin	
April 11, 1998	Vuelve	Ricky Martin	
April 18, 1998	Vuelve	Ricky Martin	
April 25, 1998	Vuelve	Ricky Martin	
May 2, 1998	Vuelve	Ricky Martin	
May 9, 1998	Vuelve	Ricky Martin	
May 16, 1998	Vuelve	Ricky Martin	
May 23, 1998	Vuelve	Ricky Martin	
May 30, 1998	Vuelve	Ricky Martin	
June 6, 1998	Me Estoy Enamorando †	Alejandro Fernández	
June 13, 1998	Me Estoy Enamorando †	Alejandro Fernández	
June 20, 1998	Vuelve	Ricky Martin	
June 27, 1998	Vuelve	Ricky Martin	
July 4, 1998	Vuelve	Ricky Martin	
July 11, 1998	Vuelve	Ricky Martin	
July 18, 1998	Vuelve	Ricky Martin	
July 25, 1998	Vuelve	Ricky Martin	
August 1, 1998	Vuelve	Ricky Martin	
August 8, 1998	Vuelve	Ricky Martin	
August 15, 1998	Vuelve	Ricky Martin	
August 22, 1998	Vuelve	Ricky Martin	
August 29, 1998	Vuelve	Ricky Martin	
September 5, 1998	Cantos de Amor	Gipsy Kings	
September 12, 1998	Vuelve	Ricky Martin	
September 19, 1998	Vuelve	Ricky Martin	
September 26, 1998	Vuelve	Ricky Martin	
October 3, 1998	Vuelve	Ricky Martin	
October 10, 1998	Cosas del Amor	Enrique Iglesias	
October 17, 1998	Cosas del Amor	Enrique Iglesias	
October 24, 1998	Cosas del Amor	Enrique Iglesias	
October 31, 1998	Cosas del Amor	Enrique Iglesias	
November 7, 1998	Cosas del Amor	Enrique Iglesias	
November 14, 1998	Te Acordarás de Mí	Olga Tañón	
November 21, 1998	Te Acordarás de Mí	Olga Tañón	
November 28, 1998	Dónde Están los Ladrones?	Shakira	
December 5, 1998	Dónde Están los Ladrones?	Shakira	
December 12, 1998	Dónde Están los Ladrones?	Shakira	
December 19, 1998	Dónde Están los Ladrones?	Shakira	
December 26, 1998	Dónde Están los Ladrones?	Shakira	
January 2, 1999	Dónde Están los Ladrones?	Shakira	
January 9, 1999	Dónde Están los Ladrones?	Shakira	
January 16, 1999	Dónde Están los Ladrones?	Shakira	
January 23, 1999	Dónde Están los Ladrones?	Shakira	
January 30, 1999	Dónde Están los Ladrones?	Shakira	
February 6, 1999	Dónde Están los Ladrones?	Shakira	
February 13, 1999	Trozos de Mi Alma	Marco Antonio Solís	
February 20, 1999	Cosas del Amor	Enrique Iglesias	
February 27, 1999	Cosas del Amor	Enrique Iglesias	
March 6, 1999	Cosas del Amor	Enrique Iglesias	
March 13, 1999	Vuelve †	Ricky Martin	
March 20, 1999	Vuelve †	Ricky Martin	
March 27, 1999	Vuelve †	Ricky Martin	
April 3, 1999	Vuelve †	Ricky Martin	
April 10, 1999	Vuelve †	Ricky Martin	
April 17, 1999	Vuelve †	Ricky Martin	
April 24, 1999	Vuelve †	Ricky Martin	
May 1, 1999	Vuelve †	Ricky Martin	
May 8, 1999	Vuelve †	Ricky Martin	
May 15, 1999	Vuelve †	Ricky Martin	
May 22, 1999	Vuelve †	Ricky Martin	
May 29, 1999	Vuelve †	Ricky Martin	
June 5, 1999	Vuelve †	Ricky Martin	
June 12, 1999	Vuelve †	Ricky Martin	
June 19, 1999	Vuelve †	Ricky Martin	
June 26, 1999	Bailamos Greatest Hits	Enrique Iglesias	
July 3, 1999	Supernatural	Santana	
July 10, 1999	MTV Unplugged	Maná	
July 17, 1999	MTV Unplugged	Maná	
July 24, 1999	Bailamos Greatest Hits	Enrique Iglesias	
July 31, 1999	Bailamos Greatest Hits	Enrique Iglesias	
August 7, 1999	Bailamos Greatest Hits	Enrique Iglesias	
August 14, 1999	Bailamos Greatest Hits	Enrique Iglesias	
August 21, 1999	Bailamos Greatest Hits	Enrique Iglesias	
August 28, 1999	Bailamos Greatest Hits	Enrique Iglesias	
September 4, 1999	Bailamos Greatest Hits	Enrique Iglesias	
September 11, 1999	Bailamos Greatest Hits	Enrique Iglesias	
September 18, 1999	Bailamos Greatest Hits	Enrique Iglesias	
September 25, 1999	Bailamos Greatest Hits	Enrique Iglesias	
October 2, 1999	Amarte Es un Placer	Luis Miguel	
October 9, 1999	Amarte Es un Placer	Luis Miguel	
October 16, 1999	Amarte Es un Placer	Luis Miguel	
October 23, 1999	Amarte Es un Placer	Luis Miguel	
October 30, 1999	Amarte Es un Placer	Luis Miguel	
November 6, 1999	Amarte Es un Placer	Luis Miguel	
November 13, 1999	Amarte Es un Placer	Luis Miguel	
November 20, 1999	Amarte Es un Placer	Luis Miguel	
November 27, 1999	Amarte Es un Placer	Luis Miguel	
December 4, 1999	Bailamos Greatest Hits	Enrique Iglesias	
December 11, 1999	Amarte Es un Placer	Luis Miguel	
December 18, 1999	Amarte Es un Placer	Luis Miguel	
December 25, 1999	Amarte Es un Placer	Luis Miguel	

== Notes ==
- The best-selling Latin pop album of 1993 was Romance by Luis Miguel, but it did not reach number one during that chart year.
