= Calentito =

Studio album by Los del Río
- Released: 1995
- Recorded: 1994–95
- Genre: Pop
- Label: BMG US Latin

Los del Río chronology
| A mí me gusta (1993) | Calentito (1995) | Macarena Non Stop (1996) |

Calentito (Warm) is a 1995 music album by Los del Río, released by Ariola/BMG. It contains 13 tracks, including their original version of the hit song "Macarena" as well as the Bayside Boys mix.

== Track listing ==
1. "Pura Carrocería" – (2:44)
2. "Venta a la Fiesta" – (3:18)
3. "Corazón Loco" – (3:31)
4. "No Te Vayas Todavía (The Old School Meme)" – (4:20)
5. "Macarena (Bayside Boys Mix)" – (3:52)
6. "Tengo, Tengo" – (4:23)
7. "Clodomiro el Ñajo" – (4:03)
8. "Yo Tengo Mis Preferencias" – (4:20)
9. "La Niña (Del Pañuelo Colorado)" – (3:45)
10. "Estás Pilla'o" – (4:30)
11. "Sevillanas de la Infanta Elena" – (4:22)
12. "Clomodiro el Ñajo (Remix)" – (5:15)
13. "Macarena (River Re-Mix 103 BMP)" – (5:02)
