= Macarena Non Stop =

Remix album by Los del Río
- Released: December 21, 1996
- Recorded: January–November 1996
- Genre: Latin pop; Latin dance
- Label: BMG US Latin; Dell Donna
- Producer: Tom Blonga

Los del Río chronology
Calentito (1995)	Macarena Non Stop (1996)	Colores (1996)

Professional ratings
Review scores
Source	Rating
AllMusic	4.5/5 stars

Macarena Non Stop is a compilation album by Latin dance group Los del Río. It was released in 1996, by BMG US Latin and Del Donna Entertainment.

Preceding the album was the Bayside Boys Remix and the original version, which reached number 1 and 23 respectively on the US Billboard Hot 100.

== Track listing ==
1. "Macarena (River Fe Mix 103 BMP)" – 5:02
2. "Pura Carroceria (Meme Dance Short Remix)" – 4:37
3. "Macarena (Mezcla Guerrillera)" – 5:35
4. "La Niña (Del Pañuelo Colorado) (The Afterhours Meme Dub)" – 6:41
5. "Macarena (New Remix by Bass Bumpers Radio Edit)" – 3:24
6. "Macarena (Bayside Boys Remix) – 3:51
7. "La Niña (Del Pañuelo Colorado) (Party Radio Edit)" – 4:05
8. "Macarena (Non Stop Version) – 7:40

== See also ==
- List of number-one Billboard Top Latin Albums from the 1990s
- List of number-one Billboard Latin Pop Albums from the 1990s
