= Los del Mar =

Canadian music duo

Los del Mar (Spanish for those from the sea, referring to Marbella) was a short-lived Canadian music duo, best known for their 1995 cover version of the Los del Río 1993 song "Macarena", which was included on their album Macarena: The Hit Album.

Their version peaked at No. 2 in Australia and No. 4 in France, and just missed the top 40 of the UK Singles Chart, peaking at number 43 while the Los Del Río version reached number 2.

Member Pedro Castaño is still touring with this song.

They are specialized in Andalusian folk music, especially sevillanas, the most typical light music of Andalusia.

== Discography ==
=== Albums ===
==== Studio albums ====
| Title | Year | Peak chart positions |
| Title | Year | CAN |
|---|---|---|
| Macarena: The Hit Album | Released on August 14, 1995 by Critique Records | 11 |
| Viva Evita | Released on July 16, 1995 by Critique Records | — |
| Los Del Mar Feat. Josè Garcia | Released in 1997 by IT-WHY | — |
| Are You Ready For This | Released on June 1, 1997 by Unidisc Music Inc. | — |
| Phase 2 | Released in 2004 by Unidisc Music Inc | — |

==== Compilation albums ====
| Title | Year |
|---|---|
| The Best Of | Released in 2002 by Unidisc Records |

=== Singles ===
| Title | Year | Peak chart position | | | | | Album |
| Title | Year | CAN | AUS | NZ | UK | US | Album |
|---|---|---|---|---|---|---|---|
| “Macarena” | 1995 | 62 | 2 | 22 | 43 | 71 | Macarena: The Hit Album & Los Del Mar Feat. Josè Garcia |
| “Maria Madalena” | 1996 | — | — | — | — | — | Viva Evita |
| “Oh Maria” | 1997 | — | — | — | — | — | Los Del Mar Feat. Josè Garcia |
| “Do Wah Nanny” | 1997 | — | — | — | — | — | Non-album singles |
| “Ooh La La La” | 2000 | — | — | — | — | — | Non-album singles |
| “Kiss Kiss On A Saturday Night” | 2000 | — | — | — | — | — | Non-album singles |
| “Papi Chulo” | 2004 | — | — | — | — | — | Phase 2 |
