= Piano de América, Vol. 2 =

Studio album by Raúl Di Blasio
- Released: 14 June 1994
- Genre: Latin pop
- Length: 50:05
- Label: RCA
- Producer: Lee Levin; Michael Levine; Raúl Di Blasio

Raúl Di Blasio chronology
En Tiempo De Amor (1993)	Piano de América, Vol. 2 (1994)	Latino (1995)

Piano de América, Vol. 2 is the ninth studio album by Argentinian musician Raúl Di Blasio. It was released on June 14, 1994. It reached number three on the Top Latin Albums chart and topped the Latin Pop Albums chart.

== Track listing ==
No.	Title	Writer(s)	Length
1.	"El Piano de America"	Raúl Di Blasio	6:14
2.	"Medley: Delicado-Tico Tico"		3:51
3.	"Medley: Detalles/El Gato Que Esta Triste y Azul"	Roberto Carlos	5:20
4.	"Hasta Que Te Conocí" (featuring Juan Gabriel)	Juan Gabriel	7:01
5.	"Cuando Te Beso"	Juan Luis Guerra	3:59
6.	"Uno" (featuring Julio Iglesias)	Enrique Santos Discépolo; Mariano Mores	5:47
7.	"Malagueña"	Ernesto Lecuona	3:22
8.	"Medley: Verde Luz (Puerto Rico)"	Antonio Cabán Vale	4:48
9.	"Pajaro Campana (Paraguay)"		5:05
10.	"What a Wonderful World" (featuring Wendy Pederson)	Bob Thiele; George David Weiss	4:38

== Certifications and sales ==
Region	Certification	Certified units/sales
United States (RIAA)	2× Platinum (Latin)	200,000^{^}
^{^} Shipments figures based on certification alone.

== See also ==
- 1994 in Latin music
- List of Billboard Latin Pop Albums number ones from the 1990s
