= Fiesta Macarena =

Studio album by Los del Río
- Released: 1996
- Recorded: 1995–1996
- Genres: Latin dance; Latin
- Length: 50:54
- Label: BMG US Latin
- Producer: Tom Blonga

Los del Río chronology
Colores (1996)	Fiesta Macarena (1996)

Singles from Fiesta Macarena
- 1. "Macarena (Bayside Boys Mix)" Released: 15 August 1995

Professional ratings
Review scores
Source	Rating
AllMusic	3/5 stars
Music Week	2/5 stars

"Macarena" (Bayside Boys Mix)
Los del Río's "Macarena" from A mí me gusta and Fiesta Macarena

Fiesta Macarena is a 1996 album by Spanish duo Los del Río based on their hit single "Macarena", released by BMG US Latin.

== Track listing ==
1. "La Niña (Del Pañuelo Colorado)" (The Party Radio Edit) – 4:08
2. "Tocalo, Tocalo" – 3:09
3. "Macarena" (Bayside Boys Remix) – 4:12
4. "San Sereni" – 4:37
5. "No Te Vayas Todavía" (The Old School Memê Remix) – 3:53
6. "Estas Pilla'o" – 4:28
7. "Pura Carroceria" (Memê Dance Short Remix) – 4:38
8. "Tengo, Tengo" – 4:24
9. "El Sueño de la Marisma" – 3:31
10. "La Polvareda" – 3:42
11. "La Niña (Del Pañuelo Colorado)" (The Afterhours Meme Dub) – 6:43
12. "Macarena" (original) – 4:09

Bonus tracks

13. "Macarena" (River Remix 103 BPM) – 5:04
14. "Macarena" (New Remix by Bass Bumpers) – 3:27
15. "Macarena" (Christmas Joy Remix, hidden track) – 3:27

== Charts ==
Chart performance for Fiesta Macarena
Chart (1996)	Peak position
Belgian Albums (Ultratop Wallonia)	49
Dutch Albums (Album Top 100)	69
Finnish Albums (Suomen virallinen lista)	22
French Albums (SNEP)	42
German Albums (Offizielle Top 100)	46
Hungarian Albums (MAHASZ)	10
Swiss Albums (Schweizer Hitparade)	19
Taiwanese International Albums (IFPI)	9
