= A mí me gusta =

Studio album by Los del Río
- Released: 13 December 1993
- Recorded: Late 1992 – Early 1993
- Genres: Latin dance; flamenco; pop
- Length: 50:45
- Label: Serdisco

Los del Río chronology
A mí me gusta (1993)	Calentito (1995)

Singles from A Mí Me Gusta
- 1. "Macarena" Released: 15 August 1995 (U.S.)

"Macarena" (Bayside Boys Mix)
Los del Río's "Macarena" from A mí me gusta and Fiesta Macarena

A mí me gusta (Spanish pronunciation: [a ˈmi me ˈɣusta], I like it) is a studio album by Spanish pop duo Los del Río, released on 13 December 1993. The opening track, "Macarena", would go on to become an international hit after it was remixed in 1995.

== Track listing ==
International version

No.	Title	Writer(s)	Length
1.	"Macarena"	Ruiz; Rafael	4:12
2.	"Tocalo, Tocalo"		3:53
3.	"Con el Corazon"		3:39
4.	"San Serení"		4:33
5.	"La Piropean"		3:40
6.	"Macarena (River Re-Mix 103 BPM)"		5:02
7.	"Que Bonita Esta la Feria"		2:55
8.	"Aqui Me Tienes Rocio"		4:30
9.	"El Sueño de la Marisma"		3:55
10.	"Abuela Rosario"		4:23
11.	"Sevillania"		4:28
12.	"Macarena (La Mezcla Guerrillera 130 BPM)"		5:35
Total length:			50:45

Colombian version (BMG Ariola de Colombia)

No.	Title	Writer(s)	Length
1.	"Macarena"	Ruiz; Rafael	4:12
2.	"Tocalo, Tocalo"		3:53
3.	"Con el Corazon"		3:39
4.	"San Serení"		4:33
5.	"La Piropean"		3:40
6.	"Que Bonita Esta la Feria"		2:55
7.	"Aqui Me Tienes Rocio"		4:30
8.	"El Sueño de la Marisma"		3:55
9.	"Abuela Rosario"		4:23
10.	"Sevillania"		4:28
11.	"Macarena (Bola Remix)"		6:01
Total length:			50:45

== Chart performance ==
Chart (1994–95)	Peak position
US Billboard Latin Albums	49
US Billboard Latin Pop Albums	25

== Certifications and sales ==
Region	Certification	Certified units/sales
Spain (Promusicae)	Platinum	500,000
