= Los del Río =

Spanish Latin pop duo

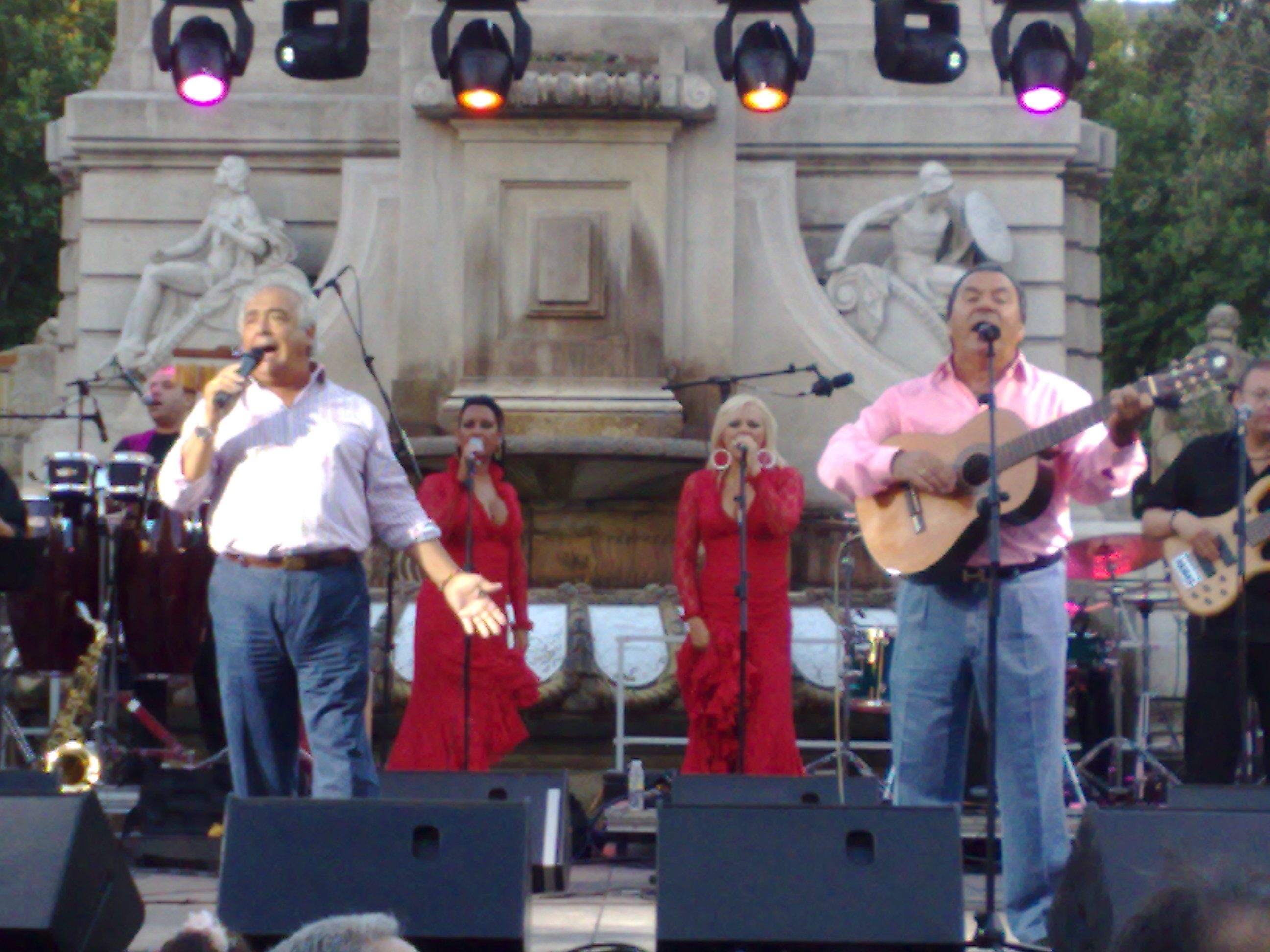
- Los del Río performing in 2009

Background information
- Origin: Dos Hermanas, Andalusia, Spain
- Genres: Latin pop; Latin dance; sevillanas
- Years active: 1962–present
- Labels: BMG US Latin; Dell Donna; RCA; IMC Records
- Members: Antonio Romero Monge; Rafael Ruiz Perdigones
- Website: Official website

Los del Río (Spanish pronunciation: [ˈlos ðel ˈri.o], "those from the river"), also known as the Del Rios, are a Spanish Latin pop and dance duo formed in Dos Hermanas, Andalusia, in 1962. Consisting of Antonio Romero Monge (born 17 February 1948) and Rafael Ruiz Perdigones (born 10 November 1938), they have released over 20 albums since their formation, beginning with Luces de Sevilla in 1967. The duo are best known for their hit 1993 dance single "Macarena", which went on to become a worldwide success after it was remixed by Bayside Boys in 1995.

== Discography ==
=== Albums ===
Year	Album	Peak chart positions	
Year	Album	US Latin	US Latin Pop
1967	Luces de Sevilla	—	—
1971	De Triana al Rocío con Los del Río	—	—
1972	Sevillanas y rumbas	—	—
1973	Sevillanas – rumbas	—	—
1974	Sevillanas – rumbas – tanguillo y vals	—	—
1975	Sevillanas – rumbas	—	—
1976	Los del Río	—	—
1978	Los del Río	—	—
1981	Con son de alegría	—	—
1984	Los del Río (El fantasma de tu nombre)	—	—
1986	Los del Río (Te estás poniendo viejo, Picoco)	—	—
1987	¡¡Qué verano me estás dando!!	—	—
1988	El mudo	—	—
1989	Puerta grande	—	—
1990	Cantemos por sevillanas	—	—
1991	Sabor y... gloria	—	—
1992	Sevilla tiene un color especial	—	—
1992	Fiesta en Belén	—	—
1993	A mí me gusta	20	6
1994	Calentito	—	—
1996	Colores	—	—
1996	Fiesta Macarena	—	—
1999	Baila	—	—
2003	Río de sevillanas	—	—
2004	P'alante	—	—
2008	Quinceañera Macarena	—	—
2011	Retrato a Sevilla	—	—
2012	Vámonos que nos vamos	—	—
"—" denotes releases that did not chart.

=== Singles ===
Year	Single	Peak chart positions						Certifications (sales threshold)	Album
Year	Single	AUS	UK	US	US Adult	US Latin	US Pop	Certifications (sales threshold)	Album
1995	"Macarena"	—	—	23	—	12	—		A mí me gusta
1995	"Macarena" (Bayside Boys Mix)	1	2	1	19	1	5	US: 4× Platinum	Fiesta Macarena
1996	"Macarena Christmas"	5	—	57	—	—	—		Non-album songs
1999	"Baila Baila"	—	—	—	—	—	—		Non-album songs
2008	"Macarena (the Art of Sound Group Mix)"	—	—	—	—	—	—		Quinceañera Macarena
2009	"Mi Gitana" (featuring the D.E.Y.)	—	—	—	—	—	—		Quinceañera Macarena
"—" denotes releases that did not chart or were not released in that country.

== Awards and nominations ==
Award	Year	Nominee(s)	Category	Result	Ref.
World Music Awards	1997	Themselves	World's Best Selling Spanish Group	Won	
World Music Awards	1997	Themselves	World's Best Selling Latin Group	Won	

== See also ==
- List of best-selling Latin music artists
