= Macarena =

1993 single by Los del Río

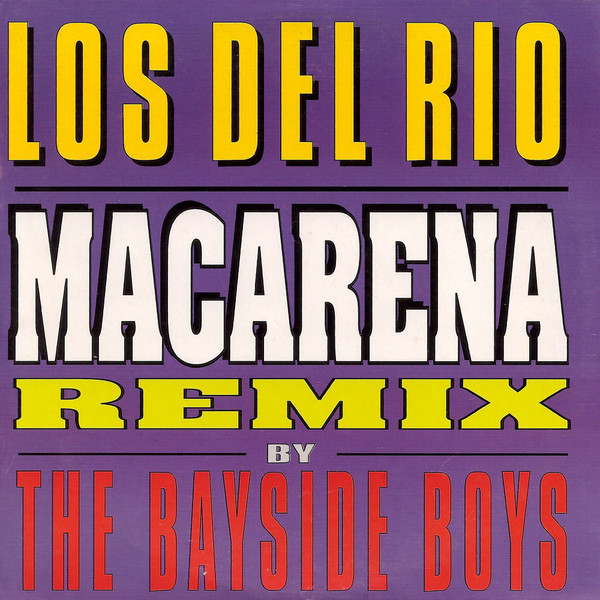
- 1995 European release (Bayside Boys mix)

Single by Los del Río

from the album A mí me gusta and Fiesta Macarena
- Released: 1993 (original version); 15 August 1995 (Bayside Boys mix)
- Genre: Flamenco; pop; dance-pop
- Length: 4:10 (original version); 4:12 (Bayside Boys mix)
- Label: RCA
- Songwriters: Rafael Ruíz; Antonio Romero
- Producer: Los del Río

Los del Río singles chronology
"Macarena" (1993)	"Macarena Christmas" (1996)

Alternative cover
- Artwork for Maquina retail release

Audio
- "Macarena" (original version) on YouTube
- "Macarena" (River Re-Mix) on YouTube

Music video
- "Macarena" (Bayside Boys remix) on YouTube

"Macarena" is a song by Spanish pop duo Los del Río, originally recorded for their 1993 album A mí me gusta. A dance remix by the electropop group Fangoria was a success in Spain, and a cover version by Los del Mar became popular in Canada. Another remix by Miami-based producers the Bayside Boys, who added a section with English lyrics, expanded its popularity, initially peaking at No. 45 on the US Billboard Hot 100 in late 1995.

The Bayside Boys mix enjoyed a significant revival the following year when it re-entered the Billboard Hot 100 and reached No. 1 for 14 weeks between August and November 1996. Its resurgence was aided by a dance craze that became a cultural phenomenon throughout the latter half of 1996 and early 1997. The song got the group ranked the "No. 1 Greatest One-Hit Wonder of All Time" by VH1 in 2002. In 2012, it was ranked No. 7 on Billboard's All Time Top 100. It also ranked at No. 7 on Billboard's All Time Latin Songs list. In 2023, Billboard ranked "Macarena" number 500 in their list of Best Pop Songs of All Time. All versions of the song have sold over 14 million copies worldwide, becoming one of the best-selling singles of all time.

== Los del Rio versions ==
=== Composition ===
As a result of their lounge act, Los del Río were invited to tour South America in 1992. While visiting Venezuela, they were invited to a private party held by the Venezuelan impresario Gustavo Cisneros. During the celebration, a local flamenco teacher, Diana Patricia Cubillán Herrera, performed a dance for the guests, and Los del Río were pleasantly surprised by Cubillán's dance skills. Spontaneously, Antonio Romero Monge, one half of the Los del Río duo, recited the song's chorus-to-be on the spot, as an accolade to Cubillán: "¡Diana, dale a tu cuerpo alegría y cosas buenas!'" ("Give your body some joy, Diana"). When Monge wrote the song, he changed the name to Macarena, in honor of his daughter Esperanza Macarena. The composition of "Macarena" features a variant on the clave rhythm. The song is written in the key of A♭ Mixolydian, moves at a tempo of 103 beats per minute, and follows the repeated chord progression A♭_{5}–G♭_{5} throughout.

=== Original and Spanish-language remixes ===
In 1993, RCA Records released "Macarena" as a single in Spain along with two house remixes by Spanish group Fangoria, intended to popularize the song in nightclubs and discotheques. The original recording had a flamenco rhythm, and the remixes change this to an electronic beat. According to Alaska, member of Fangoria, the Bayside Boys remix that followed in 1996 took their version labelled "Macarena (River Remix)" as its base. The band denounced it as plagiarism on the Court of Justice of the European Union but the case did not go through.

=== English-language Bayside Boys remix ===
"Macarena" (Bayside Boys Mix)
Los del Río's "Macarena" from A mí me gusta and Fiesta Macarena

In 1995, the Bayside Boys (composed of Mike Triay and Carlos de Yarza) produced a remix of the song that added English lyrics. Jammin Johnny Caride, a radio personality at Power 96 in Miami, first learned of the original "Macarena" when clubgoers at a club where he worked as a DJ requested the song. Caride brought the "Macarena" to his supervisors at Power 96 who asked him to create an English-language version of the song.

Caride recruited his two partners at Bayside Records, Mike "In the Night" Triay and Carlos de Yarza, to remix the original song. The new English-language lyrics were written by de Yarza. The Bayside Boys added a new dance beat with English-language lyrics sung originally by the studio singer Patty Alfaro. The finished version was called "Macarena (Bayside Boys Remix)".

The Bayside Boys remix hit No. 1 on the Billboard Hot 100 in August 1996 and remained at the top of the chart for fourteen weeks. It also topped the US Cash Box Top 100. Remarkably, even this version of the song was completely ignored by the US Hot Dance Club Play chart which represented DJ club playlists. During a concert tour, the female vocals were sung by Carla Vanessa. Vanessa accepted a fixed-fee contract for her participation and live performances, and so does not receive any residual performer royalties. The Bayside Boys mix of "Macarena" was featured in Sonic Team's Samba de Amigo for the Sega NAOMI arcade system and the Sega Dreamcast.

=== Critical reception ===
David Browne from Entertainment Weekly wrote, "It says something about our culture—something delightfully devious, probably—that a wink-wink club song has become an all-ages-approved dance step and novelty hit. Like the story it tells, 'Macarena' is a one-night stand, but you won't forget her name in the morning." Dan Glaister from The Guardian said that the track was "imitating the successes of previous summer pop sensations such as 'Y Viva Espana', 'Agadoo' and 'Saturday Night'." Melody Maker commented, "Admit it. You loved it. The sarky girlie lyric, the middle-aged Spanish geezers crooning away, the placidly agreeable beat. Eyyyyyy, macarena!" James Hamilton from Music Week's RM Dance Update described the song as an "infectious cheerful girls giggled and guys chanted 'Me No Pop I'-ish original hit version of a jaunty hip wiggling dance craze huge for ages around Europe and now (breaking out of Florida) the US, in frisky flamenco clapped jiggling 103.2bpm Bayside Boys Mix".

Peter Castro from People Magazine wrote, "The 'Achy Breaky Heart' flatlined years ago and the 'Electric Slide' is short-circuiting, so what's a dance-crazed world to do? The 'Macarena', obviously." Dave Fawbert from ShortList stated that "Macarena" is "a song that exists independently of cool, time, criticism – it's just there." Jordan Paramor from Smash Hits gave it one out of five, saying, "'Macarena' is 1996's answer to Whigfield's 'Saturday Night', overflowing with nauseating Latino-style beats and repetitive lyrics, sung by two suited middle-aged blokes who should know better. And, quelle surprise, there's even a quirky little dance routine to go with it."

=== Commercial performance ===
The reworked "Macarena (Bayside Boys remix)" spent 14 weeks at No. 1 on the US Billboard Hot 100 singles chart, becoming one of the longest runs atop the Hot 100 chart in history. The single spent its final week at No. 1 on its 46th week on the chart, recorded as the latest No. 1 single in Hot 100 history. Billboard ranked it as the No. 1 song for 1996. In the United Kingdom the song was released on 10 June 1996 and peaked at No. 2 on 17 August 1996, kept off the No. 1 spot by the huge popularity of the Spice Girls song "Wannabe". In Australia, it was the most successful song of 1996.

"Macarena" remained popular through 1996, but by the beginning of 1997, its popularity had begun to diminish. The song stayed in the Hot 100 chart for 60 weeks, the longest reign among No. 1 songs, only surpassed fifteen years later by Adele's "Rolling in the Deep". The Bayside Boys remix includes a sample from the Yazoo (also known in the United States as Yaz) track "Situation"—the laughter of Yazoo vocalist Alison Moyet. The chorus uses female vocal samples previously used by the Farm in their song "Higher and Higher (Remix)" from their album, Spartacus. The Bayside Boys toured the U.S. and the world and featured singer Carla Vanessa.

In the United States, the song, and its corresponding Macarena dance, became popular around the time of the 1996 Democratic National Convention in August of that year. C-SPAN filmed attendees dancing to the song in an afternoon session, a clip of which became popular on YouTube years later. Vice President Al Gore, having a reputation for stiffness, made a joke about doing the Macarena dance during his speech. He said, "I would like to demonstrate for you the Al Gore version of the Macarena", then remained motionless for a few seconds, and eventually asked, "Would you like to see it again?"

By 1997, the song had sold 11 million copies. While having only a 25% take in royalties from the song, Romero and Ruiz became immensely wealthy. According to BBC News, during the year 2003 alone—a full decade after the song's initial release—Romero and Ruiz made US$250,000 in royalties. (Note: Antonio Burgos claims that the song generated 1.5 billion Spanish pesetas or US $8.9 million, at the exchange rate from the time the peseta was replaced by the euro (167 pesetas was equal to $1 United States dollar).) Julio Iglesias is quoted as congratulating the duo personally: "My success singing in English from Miami is nothing compared to yours; coming out of Dos Hermanas with little international exposure elsewhere and selling these many records in Spanish takes two huge sets of cojones."

In VH1's 2002 documentary 100 Greatest One-hit Wonders, "Macarena" was ranked as No. 1. "Macarena" was also ranked No. 1 on a different VH1 documentary, 40 Awesomely Bad No. 1 Songs. On America's Best Dance Crew, it was danced to on the Whack Track Challenge, given to the Ringmasters. In July 2020, digital publication The Pudding carried out a study on the most iconic songs from the 1990s and songs that are most known by Millennials and the people of Generation Z. "Macarena" was the eighth song with the highest recognisability rate. In a December 1, 1996, Peanuts comic strip, Snoopy is about to join Woodstock and an unnamed identical bird at a frozen-over birdbath for a hockey game, but they start off by doing the Macarena dance first before playing, much to his embarrassment.

=== Dance ===
According to Los del Rio, the dance originated from the interaction between the band and the audience at concerts. It started with some improvised arm movements from the singers during an instrumental part of the song. Some people in the audience then began to imitate similar dance moves. In the interplay between the band and the audience, an early form of Macarena dance gradually emerged over the course of several concerts because stories about the Macarena dance spread among the band's fans by word of mouth.

=== Music video ===
The music video for the reworked Bayside Boys-remix of "Macarena" was directed by Vincent Calvet. It starred Mia Frye, who was also the choreographer, and features ten different women singing and dancing with Los del Río against a white background. In contrast to the scantily-clad women, Los del Río are dressed in suits. When the music video for the Bayside Boys Remix was filmed, Mia Frye choreographed a greatly simplified version of the Macarena dance that already existed at the time. Frye and director Calvet drew inspiration from video footage from clubs in Mexico that showed large crowds of people dancing the original, more complex, Macarena.

=== Accolades ===
Accolades for "Macarena"
Year	Publisher	Accolade	Rank
1996	Melody Maker	"Singles of the Year"	46
2000	VH1	"100 Greatest Dance Songs"	84
2005	Blender	"The 500 Greatest Songs Since You Were Born"	198
2013	Billboard	"Hot 100 55th Anniversary: The All-Time 100 Biggest Songs"	8
2014	Rolling Stone	"20 Biggest Songs of the Summer: The 1990s"	3
2017	Billboard	"The 100 Biggest Summer Songs of All Time"	27
2017	BuzzFeed	"The 101 Greatest Dance Songs of the '90s"	49
2017	Paste	"The 60 Best Dancefloor Classics"	60
2018	ThoughtCo	"The Best 100 Songs from the 1990s"	2
2019	Billboard	"Billboard's Top Songs of the '90s"	3
2019	Insider	"100 of the Best Songs from the '90s"	*
2019	Insider	"The 57 Best One-Hit Wonders of All Time"	*
2019	Stacker	"Best 90s Pop Songs"	2
2020	Cleveland.com	"Best Billboard Hot 100 No. 1 Song of the 1990s"	134
2023	Billboard	"Best Pop Songs of All Time"	500

(*) indicates the list is unordered.

=== Charts ===
==== Weekly charts ====
Chart (1993–1996)	Peak position
Netherlands (Dutch Top 40)	20
Netherlands (Single Top 100)	15
Peru (UPI)	1
Quebec (ADISQ)	28
Spain (AFYVE)	10
Uruguay (UPI)	1
US Billboard Hot 100	23
US Dance Singles Sales (Billboard)	15
US Hot Latin Songs (Billboard)	12

Chart (2026)	Peak position
Greece International (IFPI)	31

==== Year-end charts ====
Chart (1993)	Position
Netherlands (Dutch Top 40)	179

Chart (1996)	Position
US Billboard Hot 100	98

==== Weekly charts ====
Chart (1995–1997)	Peak position
Australia (ARIA)	1
Austria (Ö3 Austria Top 40)	1
Belgium (Ultratop 50 Flanders)	1
Belgium (Ultratop 50 Wallonia)	1
Canada (Nielsen SoundScan)	8
Canada Dance/Urban (RPM)	16
Denmark (IFPI)	1
Estonia (Eesti Top 20)	1
Europe (Eurochart Hot 100)	1
Europe (European Hit Radio)	8
Finland (Suomen virallinen lista)	1
France (SNEP)	1
Germany (GfK)	1
Greece (Pop + Rock)	1
Hungary (Mahasz)	5
Iceland (Íslenski Listinn Topp 40)	8
Ireland (IRMA)	3
Israel (Israeli Singles Chart)	1
Italy (Musica e dischi)	24
Latvia (Latvijas Top 50)	1
Netherlands (Dutch Top 40)	1
Netherlands (Single Top 100)	1
New Zealand (Recorded Music NZ)	2
Norway (VG-lista)	2
Scottish Singles Sales (Official Charts)	2
Sweden (Sverigetopplistan)	2
Sweden (Swedish Dance Chart)	1
Switzerland (Schweizer Hitparade)	1
Taiwan (IFPI)	2
UK Singles (Official Charts)	2
UK Airplay (Music Week)	20
UK Pop Tip Club Chart (Music Week)	1
US Billboard Hot 100	1
US Adult Contemporary (Billboard)	28
US Adult Pop Airplay (Billboard)	19
US Dance Singles Sales (Billboard)	46
US Pop Airplay (Billboard)	5
US Rhythmic Airplay (Billboard)	5
US Cash Box Top 100	1

==== Year-end charts ====
Chart (1996)	Position
Australia (ARIA)	1
Austria (Ö3 Austria Top 40)	1
Belgium (Ultratop 50 Flanders)	3
Belgium (Ultratop 50 Wallonia)	5
Europe (Eurochart Hot 100)	2
Europe (European Hit Radio)	11
France (SNEP)	1
Germany (Media Control)	3
Iceland (Íslenski Listinn Topp 40)	16
Latvia (Latvijas Top 50)	28
Netherlands (Dutch Top 40)	1
Netherlands (Single Top 100)	5
New Zealand (RIANZ)	9
Norway (VG-lista)	3
Sweden (Topplistan)	11
Sweden (Swedish Dance Chart)	32
Switzerland (Schweizer Hitparade)	1
UK Singles (OCC)	22
UK Pop Tip Club Chart (Music Week)	24
US Billboard Hot 100	1

Chart (1997)	Position
US Billboard Hot 100	82

==== Decade-end charts ====
Chart (1990–1999)	Position
Austria (Ö3 Austria Top 40)	3
Belgium (Ultratop 50 Flanders)	25
Canada (Nielsen SoundScan)	14
Netherlands (Dutch Top 40)	3
US Billboard Hot 100	2

=== Certifications and sales ===
Region	Certification	Certified units/sales
Australia (ARIA)	3× Platinum	210,000^{^}
Austria (IFPI Austria)	Platinum	50,000^{*}
Belgium (BRMA)	2× Platinum	100,000^{*}
Canada	—	45,000
Colombia	—	500,000
France (SNEP)	Diamond	1,000,000
Germany (BVMI)	3× Gold	750,000^{^}
Mexico Maxi single - 4 versions	—	130,000
Netherlands (NVPI)	Platinum	95,000
New Zealand (RMNZ)	Platinum	30,000^{‡}
Spain (Promusicae) Digital sales	Gold	30,000^{‡}
Sweden (GLF)	Gold	25,000^{^}
Switzerland (IFPI Switzerland)	Gold	25,000^{^}
United Kingdom (BPI) Digital sales	2× Platinum	1,200,000^{‡}
United States (RIAA)	4× Platinum	4,000,000
Streaming
Greece (IFPI Greece)	Gold	1,000,000^{†}
Summaries
Worldwide	—	14,000,000
^{*} Sales figures based on certification alone.^{^} Shipments figures based on certification alone.^{‡} Sales+streaming figures based on certification alone.^{†} Streaming-only figures based on certification alone.

=== "Macarena Christmas" ===
Pan-European magazine Music & Media wrote, "Just when you thought this was just a version of their worldwide smash with a couple of jingle bells added, this seasonal single erupts into a cheerful medley of Joy to the World, Jingle Bells and Silent Night. For all those who are looking for an uncomplicated Christmas."

==== Weekly charts ====
Chart (1996–1997)	Peak position
Australia (ARIA)	5
Belgium Dance (Ultratop)	19
Denmark (IFPI)	11
Finland (Suomen virallinen lista)	12
France (SNEP)	34
Germany (GfK)	84
Netherlands (Single Top 100)	31
Norway (VG-lista)	16
Spain (AFYVE)	1
Sweden (Sverigetopplistan)	40
Taiwan (IFPI)	10
UK Pop Tip Club Chart (Music Week)	30
US Billboard Hot 100	57

==== Year-end charts ====
Chart (1997)	Position
Australia (ARIA)	81

=== Certifications ===
Region	Certification	Certified units/sales
Australia (ARIA)	Gold	35,000^{^}
^{^} Shipments figures based on certification alone.

== Los del Mar cover version ==
"Macarena"
- Cover art of original Wil Veloz version

Single by Los del Mar

from the album Viva Evita/Macarena: The Hit Album
- Released: 1995; 1996 (international)
- Recorded: 1995
- Genre: Latin pop; dance-pop
- Length: 3:49
- Label: Lime Inc.
- Songwriters: Rafael Ruiz Perdigones; Antonio Romero Monge; SWK
- Producer: Los del Mar

Alternative cover
- Artwork for French and Australian releases

The song was covered by Canadian musical duo Los del Mar with vocals by Wil Veloz. It was first released in 1995. In their native Canada, this version was popular on MuchMusic and top 40 radio in 1995. It was reissued in 1996 in a new version with vocals from Pedro Castaño, which was also featured on their album Viva Evita (retitled Macarena: The Hit Album overseas). In Australia, this new version reached No. 2 on the ARIA Singles Chart, below the Bayside Boys' reworking of the original.

=== Critical reception ===
British magazine Music Week rated the song three out of five, writing, "Hot on the heels of RCA's release of the original version by Los Del Rio comes a second, lower-key version of the Spanish dance tune. Whoever wins the battle, the song is destined to become 1996's 'Lambada', loved and loathed in equal measure."

=== Music video ===
A music video was produced for the Los del Mar version. It shows Pedro Castano and his pet cat in an apartment getting ideas for the song's dance while watching people on television. By the next verse, more people dance outside to the song wherein Castano joins in and sings. Later on, a mob boss and his sidekicks pull up in a car and ask if they can join the dance. They are they are then seen dancing with the others. Excluding the outro segment, the video cuts around 40 seconds from the regular song.

=== Track listings ===
==== Will Veloz version ====
- Canadian CD single
1. "Macarena" (Radio Mix) – 3:49
2. "Macarena" (Mar Fe Mix) – 5:02
3. "Macarena" (Bola Mix) – 6:38
- German CD single
1. "Macarena" (Radio Mix) – 3:15
2. "Macarena" (Mar Fe Mix) – 5:02
3. "Macarena" (Ibiza House Mix) – 5:56
4. "Macarena" (Bola Remix) – 6:38
5. "Macarena" (Club Mix) – 5:18
- UK CD single
1. "Macarena" (Radio Version) – 3:48
2. "Macarena" (Mar Fe Mix) – 5:05
3. "Macarena" (Gregorio Mix) – 7:01
4. "Macarena" (Beat Foundation-Full Frontal Mix) – 6:21
5. "Macarena" (Beat Foundation-Infinity Dub) – 6:46

==== Pedro Castaño version ====
- France CD single
1. "Macarena" (Radio Mix) – 3:49
2. "Macarena" (Bola Mix) – 6:08
3. "Macarena" (Summer Mix '96) – 5:43
4. "Macarena" (Mar Fe Mix) – 5:03
- France cardboard sleeve/Australian CD single
1. "Macarena" (Radio Mix) – 3:49
2. "Macarena" (Bola Mix) – 6:08

=== Charts ===
==== Weekly charts ====
Chart (1995–1997)	Peak position
Australia (ARIA)	2
Belgium (Ultratop 50 Wallonia)	22
Canada Retail Singles (The Record)	1
Canada Top Singles (RPM)	62
Canada Dance/Urban (RPM)	2
Europe (Eurochart Hot 100)	19
France (SNEP)	4
Iceland (Íslenski Listinn Topp 40)	37
New Zealand (Recorded Music NZ)	22
Quebec (ADISQ)	19
Scottish Singles Sales (Official Charts)	29
UK Singles (Official Charts)	43
UK Club Chart (Music Week)	28
US Billboard Hot 100	71
US Hot Dance Singles Sales (Billboard)	46

==== Year-end charts ====
Chart (1995)	Position
Canada Dance/Urban (RPM)	10

Chart (1996)	Position
Australia (ARIA)	14
France (SNEP)	12

==== Decade-end charts ====
Chart (1990–1999)	Position
Canada (Nielsen SoundScan)	14

=== Certifications ===
Region	Certification	Certified units/sales
Australia (ARIA)	Platinum	70,000^{^}
France (SNEP)	Gold	250,000^{*}
^{*} Sales figures based on certification alone.^{^} Shipments figures based on certification alone.

== Tyga cover version ==
"Ayy Macarena"

Single by Tyga
- Released: 13 November 2019
- Recorded: 2019
- Length: 2:11
- Label: Last Kings; Columbia
- Songwriters: Michael Stevenson; Rafael Ruiz Perdigones; Antonio Romero Monge; Pliznaya
- Producer: Pliznaya

Tyga singles chronology
"Juicy" (2019)	"Ayy Macarena" (2019)	"Freak" (2020)

Music video
- "Ayy Macarena" on YouTube

On 13 November 2019, American rapper Tyga released a remix, rap version of the song, called "Ayy Macarena". J Balvin also sings the hook of the original song at the beginning of this version. This version has a more club-oriented sound. This version's official remix features Ozuna. In addition to this, a music video premiered on Tyga's official YouTube channel on 17 December 2019, heavily inspired by the film The Mask. Los Del Rio also make a cameo appearance, performing the original chorus at the beginning of the video and making sparse appearances throughout. The made international charts raking in at 88th globally at its first debut and 64th overall. The song also top the Apple Music and ITunes Charts and garnered 8 weeks on the global charts.

=== Charts ===
==== Weekly charts ====
Chart (2020)	Peak position
Austria (Ö3 Austria Top 40)	13
Belgium (Ultratip Bubbling Under Flanders)	4
Belgium (Ultratip Bubbling Under Wallonia)	16
Canada Hot 100 (Billboard)	48
Czech Republic Singles Digital (ČNS IFPI)	82
Denmark (Tracklisten)	24
France (SNEP)	97
Germany (GfK)	9
Hungary (Dance Top 40)	28
Hungary (Stream Top 40)	32
Italy (FIMI)	21
Romania (Airplay 100)	6
Slovakia Singles Digital (ČNS IFPI)	56
Spain (Promusicae)	27
Switzerland (Schweizer Hitparade)	9
Turkey (Radiomonitor International List)	1
Ukraine Airplay (TopHit)	33
US Bubbling Under Hot 100 (Billboard)	3
US Hot R&B/Hip-Hop Songs (Billboard)	42
US Rhythmic Airplay (Billboard)	27

==== Year-end charts ====
Chart (2020)	Position
Germany (GfK)	74
Hungary (Dance Top 40)	79
Romania (Airplay 100)	8
Switzerland (Schweizer Hitparade)	81
Turkey (Radiomonitor International List)	12

=== Certifications ===
Region	Certification	Certified units/sales
Denmark (IFPI Danmark)	Gold	45,000^{‡}
France (SNEP)	Gold	100,000^{‡}
Germany (BVMI)	Gold	200,000^{‡}
Italy (FIMI)	Platinum	70,000^{‡}
Mexico (AMPROFON)	Platinum	60,000^{‡}
Poland (ZPAV)	Platinum	20,000^{‡}
Spain (Promusicae)	Gold	30,000^{‡}
Switzerland (IFPI Switzerland)	Gold	10,000^{‡}
United States (RIAA)	Gold	500,000^{‡}
^{‡} Sales+streaming figures based on certification alone.

== Other remixes, covers, sampling and parodies ==
=== MC Rage parody ===
MC Rage released the single "Fuck Macarena" in November 1996. It is a hardcore techno parody of Los del Río's "Macarena" and mocks the original version's lyrics, as do the dancers in the music video. MC Rage sings vulgar mocking lyrics as an outburst against the huge success of "Macarena". It peaked at No. 7 on the Dutch Top 40 on 27 December 1996, and at No. 8 on the Dutch Mega Top 100 on 25 January 1997. The song has a music video featuring gabber ravers dancing hakken.

=== The GrooveGrass Boyz version ===
In 1997, the GrooveGrass Boyz recorded a country music version of the "Macarena", with rewritten lyrics. This rendition peaked at No. 70 on the Hot Country Songs chart and No. 7 on the Bubbling Under Hot 100. This version was released on Imprint Records and sold over 80,000 copies.

=== Jeffrey A. Harvey physics parody ===
At the Strings 1998 conference in Santa Barbara about string theory, shortly after the publication of the paper Anti De Sitter Space and Holography by Edward Witten, Jeffrey A. Harvey composed a parody song called "The Maldecena" about the holographic principle.

=== Pitbull sampling ===
In 2012, Cuban-American rapper Pitbull and Dominican rapper Sensato recorded the song titled "Global Warming" as the intro song from his seventh studio album of the same name. The song sampled the Bayside Boys remix.

=== Jay-5 versions ===
Reggae and dancehall artist Jay-5 released the album The Dancehall Macarena on VP Records in 2015, featuring the song "Dancehall Macarena", an upbeat fusion of dancehall moves, inspired by the infectious 1990s classic. The single "Dancehall Macarena" is the first official Jamaican dancehall line dance, and gained over 1.6 million views on YouTube. The success of "Dancehall Macarena" inspired a popular reggaeton version in 2016, "Dancehall Macarena Remix", by Colombian reggaeton artist Japanese featuring Jay-5.

=== Gente de Zona version ===
In 2016, Cuban duo Gente de Zona teamed up with Los del Río and released a new joint version of the song, with new lyrics.

=== Le Sserafim sampling ===
In 2026, South Korean girl group Le Sserafim released the song "Boompala" as the lead single of their second full album Pureflow Pt. 1. The song samples the chorus of "Macarena", and its choreography includes a part of the original dance.

== See also ==
- List of best-selling singles
- List of best-selling Latin singles
