= List of songs recorded by Luis Miguel =

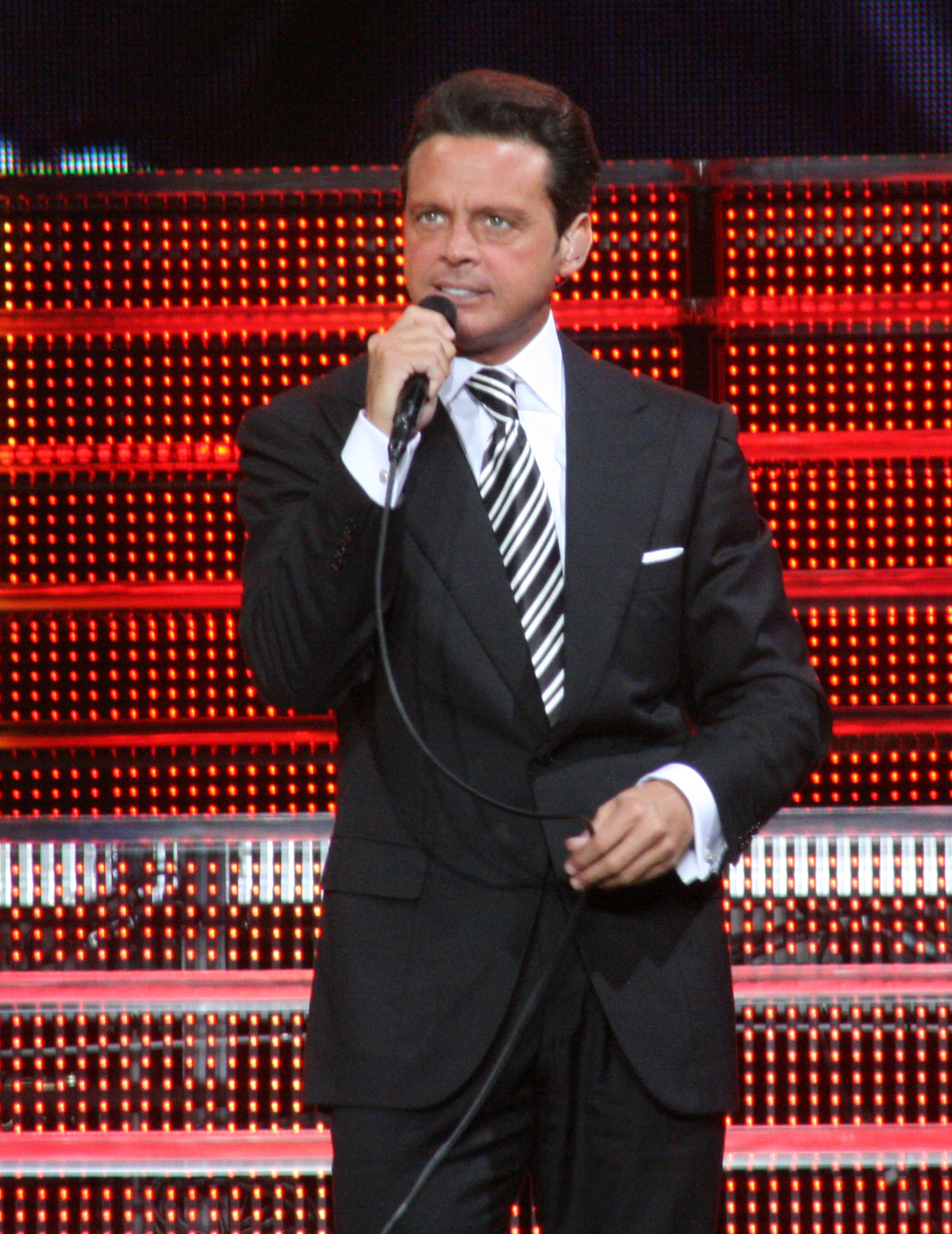
Luis Miguel performing at the Broomfield Event Center in Denver, 2008

Mexican singer Luis Miguel has recorded material for 20 studio albums and sung songs mostly in Spanish. He has also recorded his music in Italian and Portuguese. His pop music albums mainly consist of soft rock and pop ballad tunes.

== Recording history ==
At age 11, Miguel signed with EMI Music, and released his debut album Un Sol in 1982; it produced his first hit, "1+1=2 Enamorados" ("1+1=2 Lovers"). Most of the tracks on the album were written by Javier Santos and Rubén Amado. Mexican singer-songwriter Juan Gabriel wrote two songs for Un Sol: "Mentira" and "Lo Que Me Gusta". Luis Miguel's second studio album, Directo al Corazón, was released later in the year.

Miguel released his third and fourth studio albums, Decídete and Palabra de Honor, in 1983 and 1984, respectively. The songs on both albums were mostly written by Honorio Herrero, the director of Spanish record label Hispavox. Notable hits from the albums include "Un Rock and Roll Sonó" ("A Rock and Roll Sound"), "La Chica del Bikini Azul" ("The Girl in the Blue Bikini"), "Decídete", and "No Me Puedes Dejar Así". For the Brazilian market, Miguel recorded Portuguese-language versions of Decídete (Decide Amor) and Palabra de Honor (Meu Sonho Perdido). The tracks were adapted into Portuguese by Brazilian composer Carlos Colla. The former album also contains Portuguese-language versions of "1+1=2 Enamorados" and "Mentira" which were previously released as singles only.

Miguel made a guest appearance on Scottish singer Sheena Easton's album Todo Me Recuerda a Ti (1984) on the duet "Me Gustas Tal Como Eres", which was composed by Juan Carlos Calderón. The track won the Grammy Award for Best Mexican/Mexican-American Performance in 1985. It was later included on Palabra de Honor. Miguel starred in the 1984 film Ya nunca más and recorded tracks for the film's soundtrack. In the same year, he released También es Rock, an extended play (EP) of rock and roll covers, mainly those originally performed by Elvis Presley.

Miguel participated in the 1985 Sanremo Music Festival in Italy and placed second for his song "Noi Ragazzi di Oggi" ("We Children of Today"). He then recorded Italian-language versions of his songs from Palabra de Honor and a new track, "Il Cielo" ("The Sky"), written by Toto Cutugno and Cristiano Minellono. The songs were included on his compilation album Canta en Italiano (1985) with Luigi Albertelli translating the recordings in Italian. Miguel appeared as a lead role in the 1985 film Fiebre de amor and sang for the soundtrack from the film. Fellow Mexican entertainer Lucero, who co-stars in the film, performs a duet with Miguel on the soundtrack with the song "Todo el Amor del Mundo".

In 1986, Miguel left EMI and signed with Warner Music following a fallout from his father and his mother's disappearance. He collaborated with Calderón to work on his fifth studio album, Soy Como Quiero Ser, which was released in 1987. The album mainly consists of Spanish-language adaptations of songs first sung in English. "Ahora Te Puedes Marchar" ("You Can Go Away Now"), a cover of Dusty Springfield's "I Only Want to Be with You", became his first song to reach number-one on the Billboard Hot Latin Song chart in the United States. Soy Como Quiero Ser also features two duets, both penned by Calderón: "Sin Hablar" ("Without Speaking") with American singer Laura Branigan and "No Me Puedo Escapar de Ti" ("I Can't Escape From You") with Rocío Banquells. In Brazil, "Ahora Te Puedes Marchar", "Eres Tú", and "Yo Que No Vivo Sin Ti" were translated into Portuguese as "Agora Você Pode Ir", "Era Você", and "Eu Que Não Vivo Sem Você" respectively by Arnaldo Sacomanni.

Miguel worked with Calderón again on the subsequent album Busca una Mujer (1988). Calderón composed the majority of the tracks on the album, including "Fría Como el Viento" ("Cold as the Wind") and "La Incondicional", the lead singles from the album which reached number-one on the Hot Latin Songs in the US. Sacomanni translated the songs in Portuguese as "Fria Como o Vento" and "A Incondicional", which was included in the Brazil edition of Busca una Mujer. Miguel collaborated with Calderón once more to compose tracks on his seventh studio album, 20 Años (1990). "Entrégate" and "Tengo Todo Excepto a Ti", were the lead singles from the album and topped the Hot Latin Songs chart in the US. Calderón adapted The Jackson 5's "Blame It on the Boogie" in Spanish as "Será Que No Me Amas" ("It's Just That You Don't Love Me"), and it became a hit in Mexico.

Facing a contractual deadline to record a new album, Miguel teamed up with Mexican singer-songwriter Armando Manzanero to produce Romance (1991), a collection of twelve boleros that were performed by other artists. Unlike Miguel's previous albums, the music in Romance features strings with arrangements by Bebu Silvetti. The success of the album led to a renewed mainstream interest in the bolero genre. Miguel covers two of Manzanero's songs on the album—"Te Extraño" ("I Miss You") and "No Sé Tú" ("I Don't Know You")—the latter track became his seventh song to reach number-one on the Hot Latin Songs chart and won the Lo Nuestro Award for Pop Song of the Year in 1993. A year later, Miguel recorded a cover of Nino Bravo's "América, América" for the live EP América & en Vivo. He performed it as a tribute to the soldiers who fought in the Gulf War.

Romance was followed by three more albums: Segundo Romance (1994), Romances (1997), and Mis Romances (2001). Between the release of the Romance-themed products, Miguel released Aries, Nada Es Igual... (1996), and Amarte Es un Placer (1999). He performed a duet with Frank Sinatra on Sinatra's album Duets II (1994) on the track "Come Fly with Me". To date, it is his only English-language song that he has commercially released. Miguel recorded "Sueña", the Spanish-language version of "Someday" from Disney's 1996 film The Hunchback of Notre Dame for the Latin American edition of the film's soundtrack and it was included on Nada Es Igual. "Tu Mirada", from Amarte Es un Placer, won the Latin Grammy Award for Best Male Pop Vocal Performance. Miguel concluded the Romance series in 2002 with Mis Boleros Favoritos, a compilation of previously recorded songs from bolero albums, and recorded a new track, "Hasta Que Vuelvas".

Manzanero collaborated with Miguel on the Romance albums as well as on Amarte Es un Placer and penned original compositions for the artist including "Por Debajo de la Mesa" and "Dormir Contigo", which Manzanero has stated are his favorite songs that he has written. Miguel's 15th studio album, 33 (2003), was a return to the pop music genre. The lead single, "Te Necesito", was written by Juan Luis Guerra and features American a capella group Take 6 on the background vocals. It became Miguel's 16th song to reach number-one on the Hot Latin Songs chart. The following year, Miguel recorded his first mariachi album México en la Piel. Afterwards, he released his greatest hits album in 2005 which contained two original compositions: "Misterios de Amor" and "Si Te Perdiera".

Miguel launched a Christmas album in 2006 titled Navidades. Two years later, he enlisted Spanish songwriter Manuel Alejandro to compose tracks for his 18th studio album, Cómplices. Miguel released his self-titled album in 2010 featuring his familiar up-tempo pop sounds and orchestrated ballads. His single, "Déjà Vu", premiered as a digital download in 2014 but was a commercial failure. After a three-year hiatus, Miguel released ¡México Por Siempre! in 2017, his first disc in seven years and his second mariachi album.

== Songs ==
Key
†	Indicates bilingual recording
#	Indicates English-language recording
‡	Indicates Italian-language recording
§	Indicates Portuguese-language recording
*	Indicates Spanish-language recording

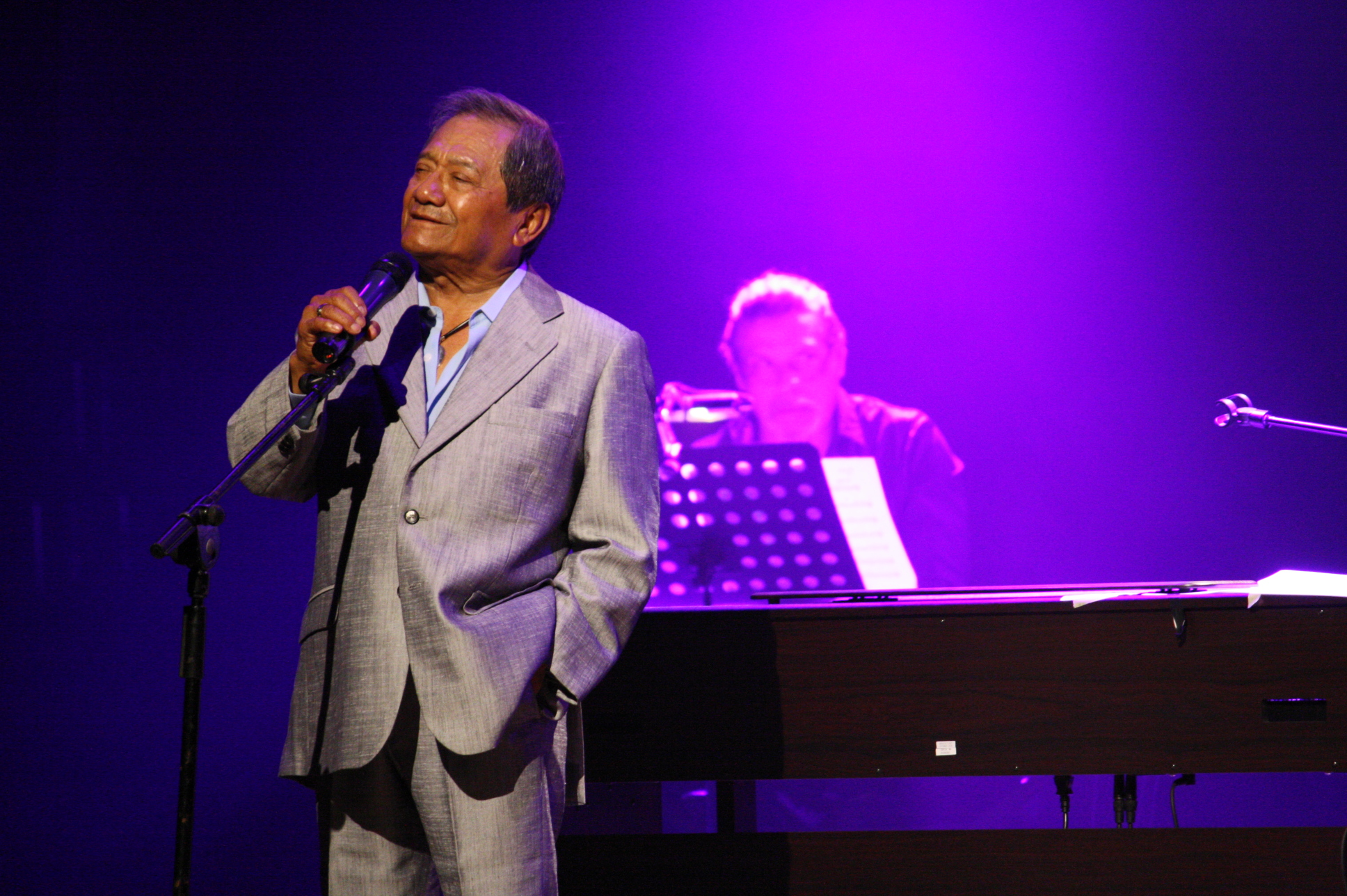
Luis Miguel covers Armando Manzanero's songs on his bolero albums Romance, Segundo Romance, and Romances. In turn, Manzanero has written several compositions for Luis Miguel including "Por Debajo de la Mesa and Dormir Contigo.

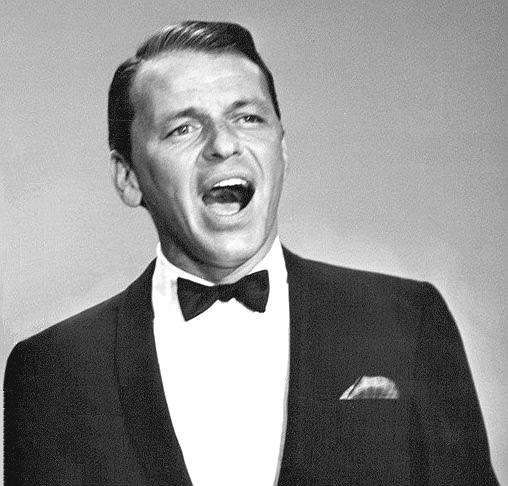
American singer Frank Sinatra and Luis Miguel recorded a duet of Sinatras's 1958 single "Come Fly with Me".

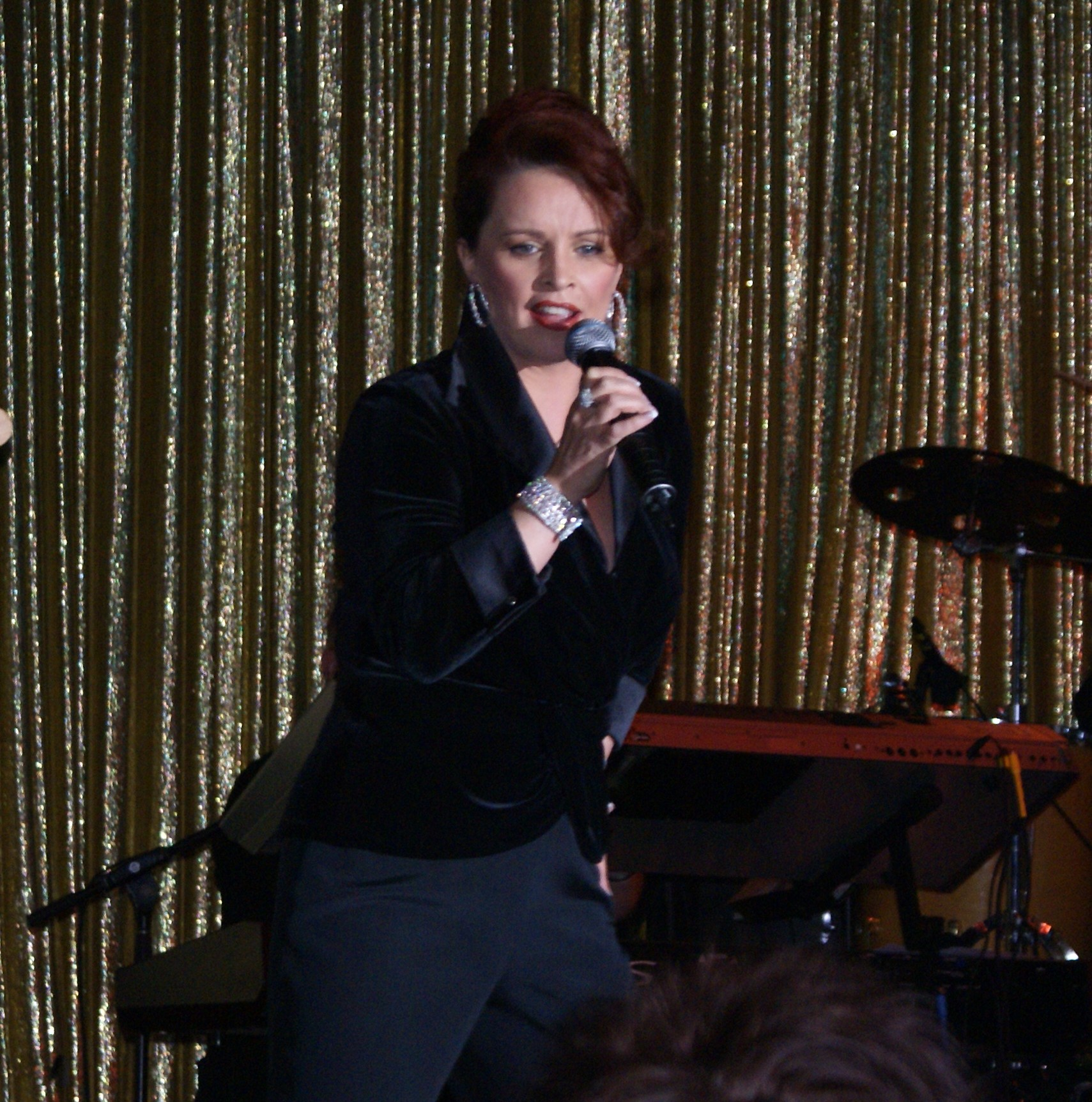
Sheena Easton performed "Me Gustas Tal Como Eres with Luis Miguel in 1984.

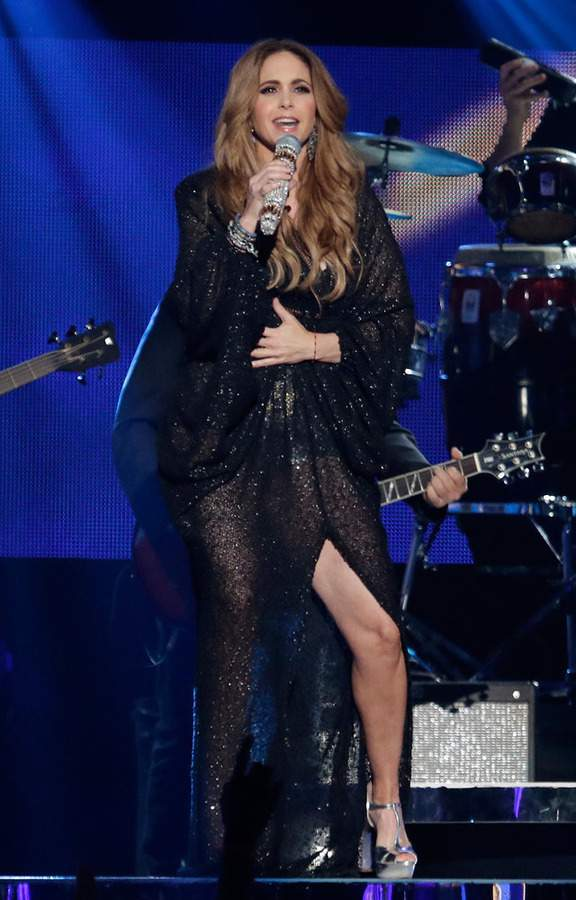
Lucero co-starred with Luis Miguel on the 1985 film Fiebre de amor. She also recorded a duet with Luis Miguel on the track, "Todo el Amor del Mundo" from the film's soundtrack.

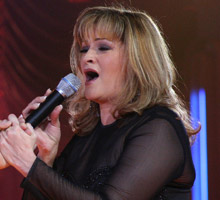
Mexican singer Rocío Banquells collaborated with Luis Miguel on song "No Me Puedo Escapar de Ti" in 1987.

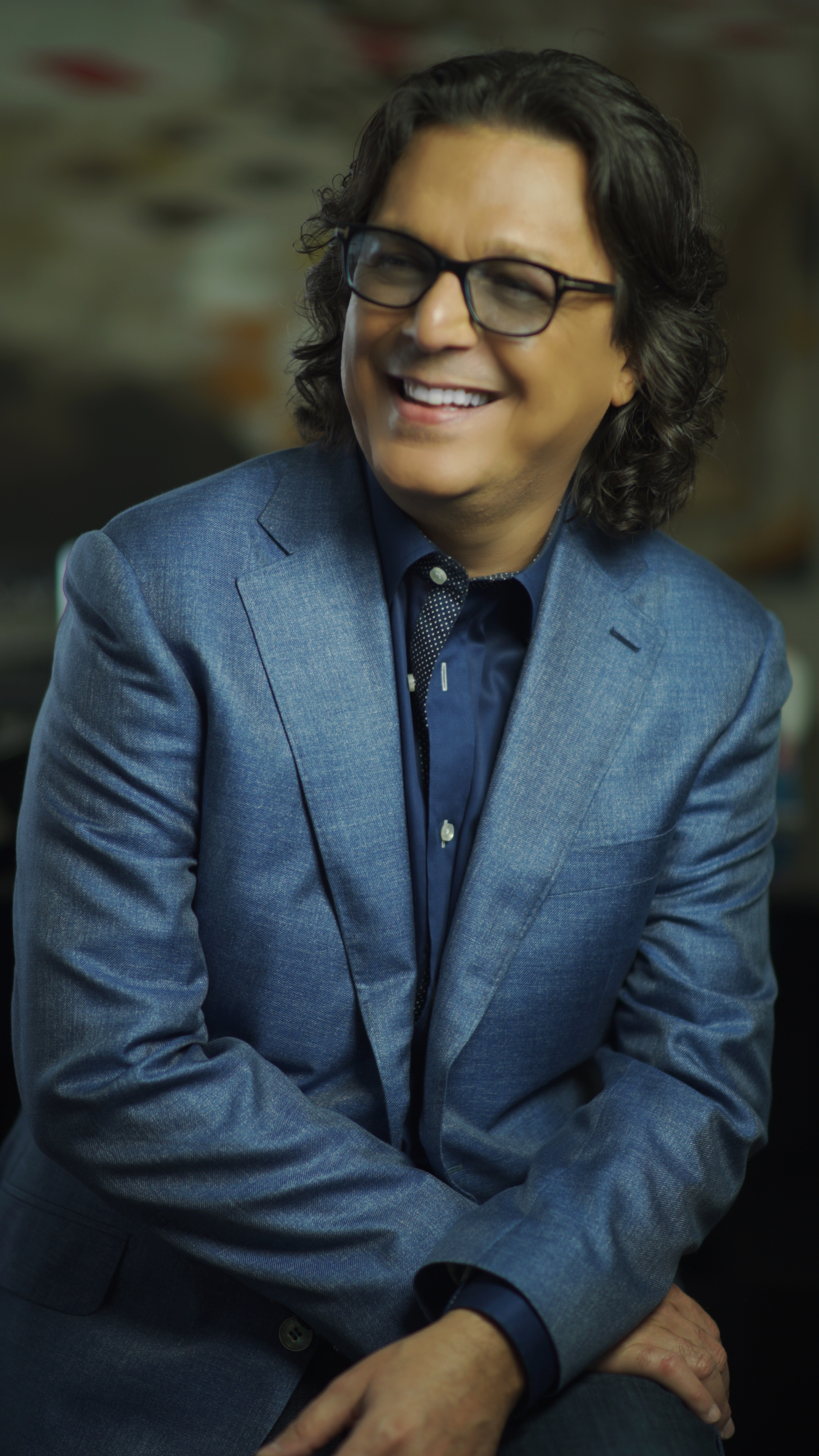
Cuban American musician Rudy Pérez composed four tracks on Luis Miguel's 1993 album Aries. Pérez also wrote two songs for Luis Miguel on his 1996 album Nada Es Igual....

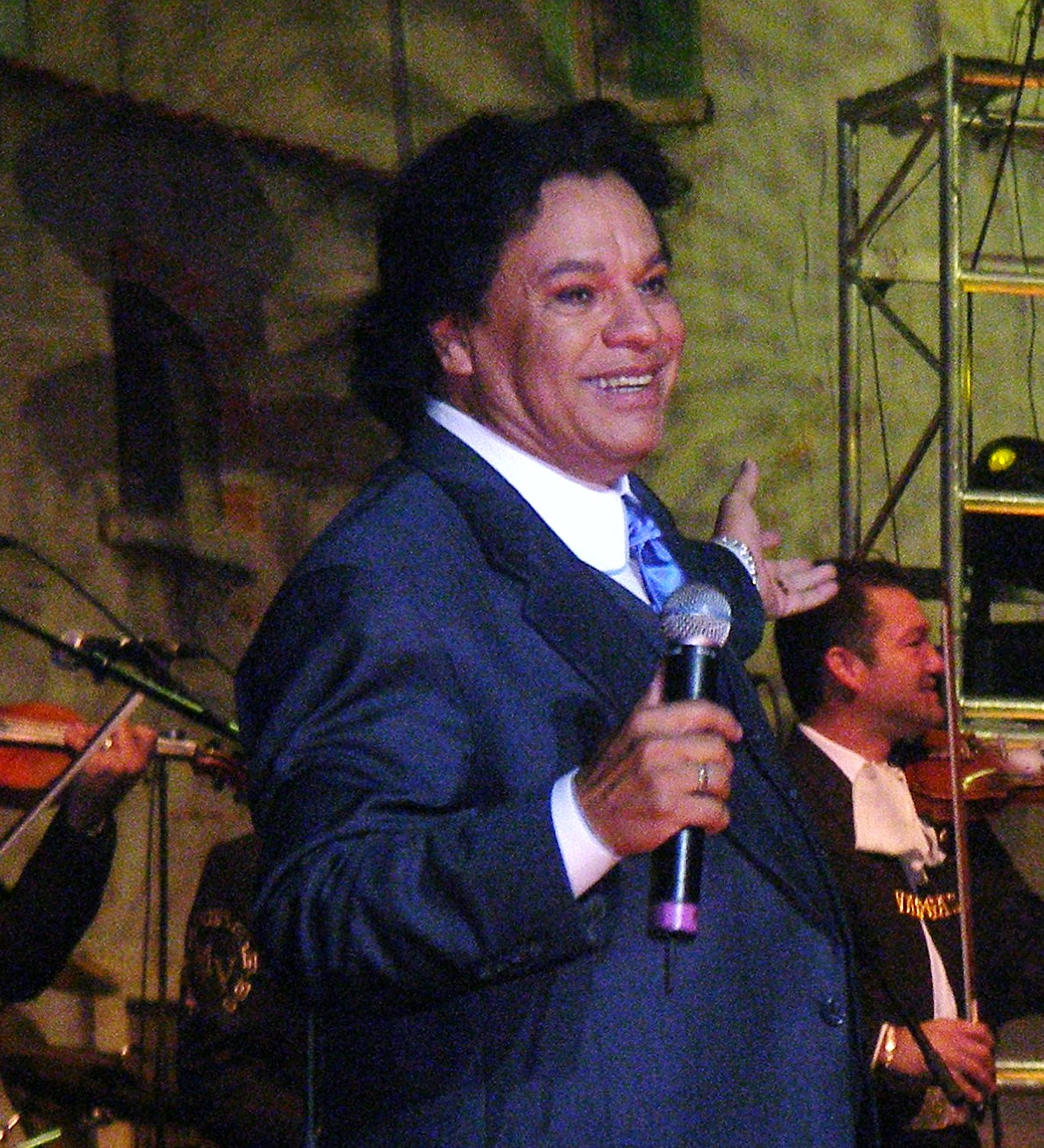
Singer-songwriter Juan Gabriel penned two tracks on Luis Miguel's debut in 1982: "Mentira" and "Lo Que Me Gusta". Luis Miguel also covered Juan Gabriel's song "No Discutamos" in 2017.

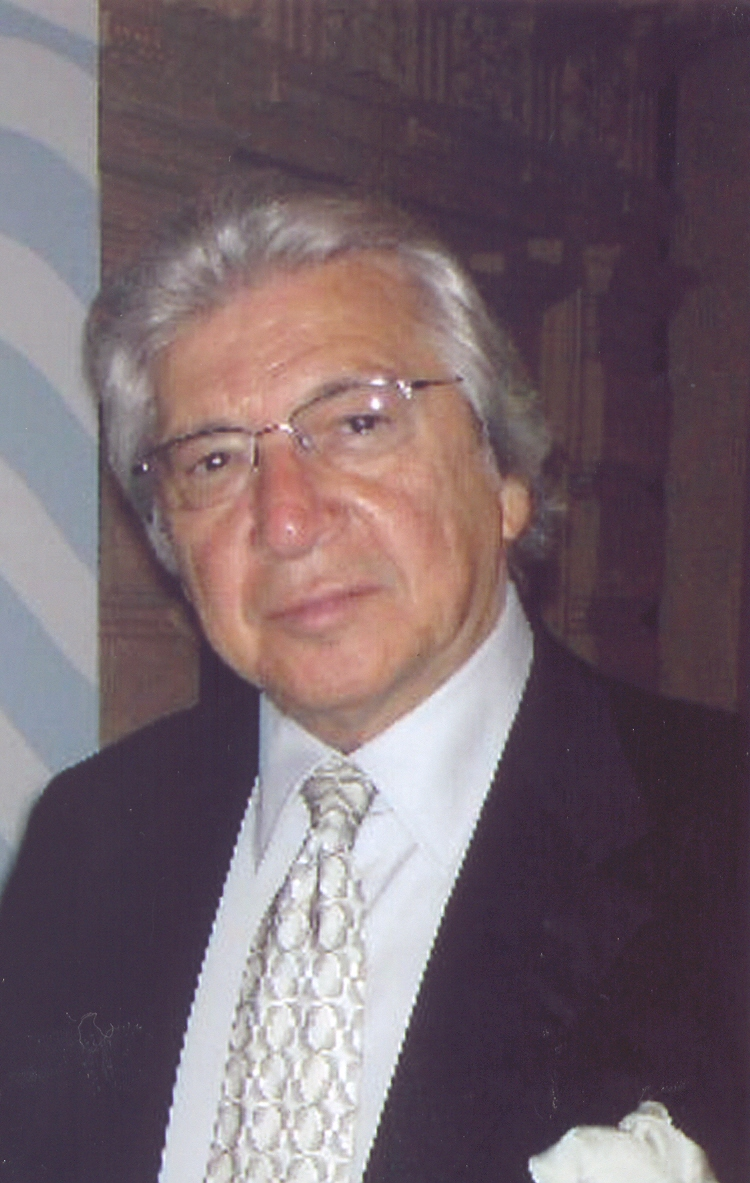
Spanish songwriter Manuel Alejandro collaborated with Luis Miguel in 2008 by composing songs for his album Cómplices. He also penned the tracks "Al Que Me Siga" and "Si Te Perdiera" for Luis Miguel in 2001 and 2005, respectively.

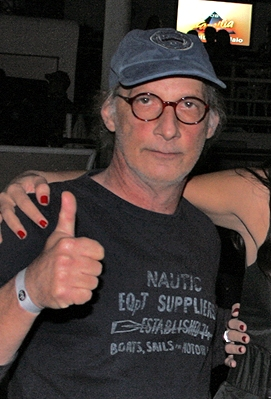
Brazilian songwriter Arnaldo Sacomanni adapted several of Luis Miguel's songs in Portuguese for the Brazilian editions of Soy Como Quiero Ser and Busca una Mujer.

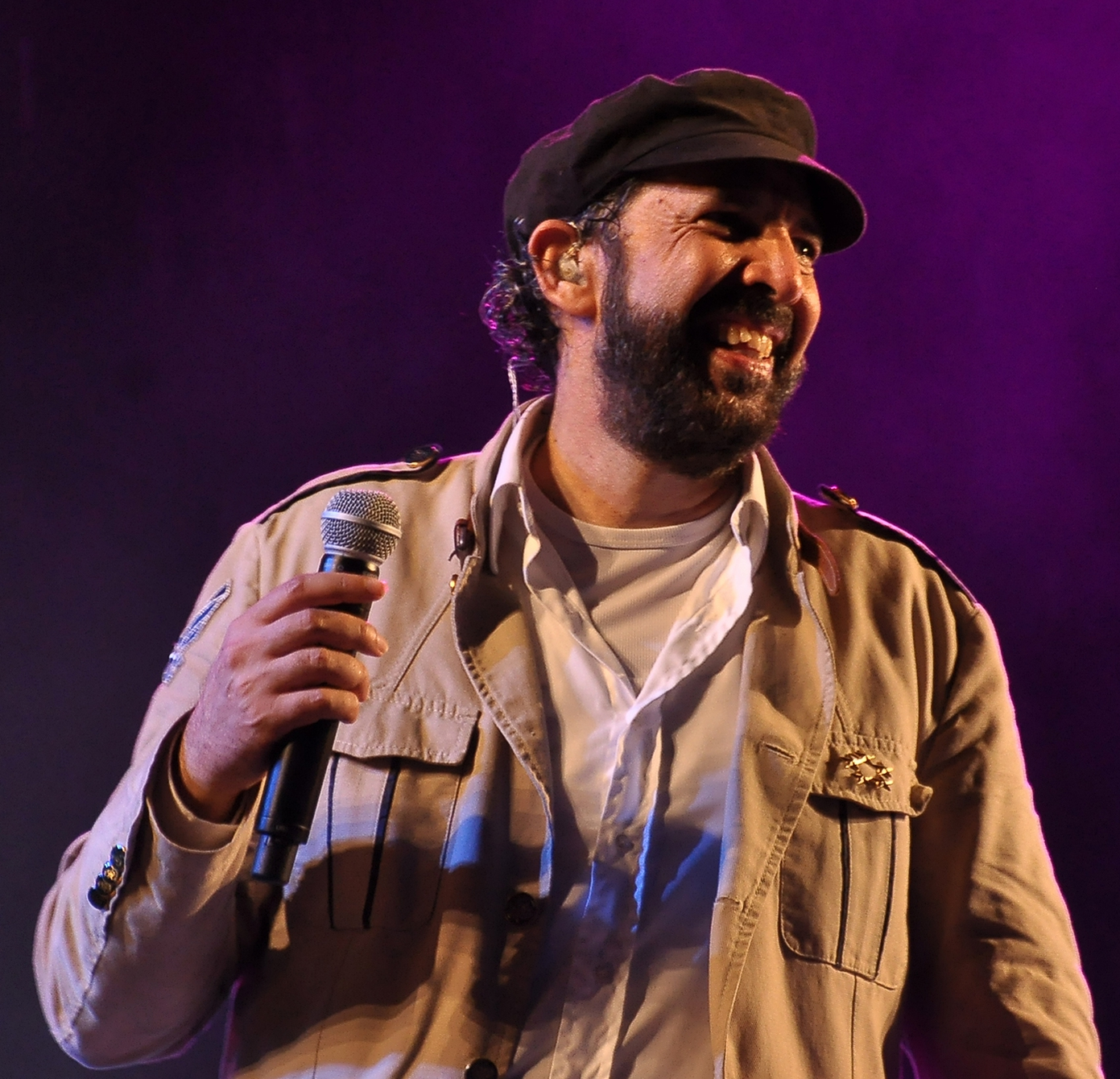
Dominican Republic singer-songwriter Juan Luis Guerra penned the tracks "Hasta Que Me Olvides and "Te Necesito" for Luis Miguel.

Released songs recorded by Luis Miguel
Song	Other performer(s)	Writer(s)	Originating album	Year	Ref.
"1+1=2 Enamorados" *	—N/a	Rubén Amado; Javier Santos Arrieta	Un Sol	1982	
"A Mis Años Ya Te Amo" *	—N/a	Luis Gómez-Escolar; Julio Seijas	Directo al Corazón	1982	
"Abrázame" *	—N/a	Rudy Pérez; Mark Portmann	Nada Es Igual...	1996	
"Acapulco Amor" *	—N/a	Luisito Rey	Fiebre de amor	1985	
"Adolescente Soñador" *	—N/a	Rubén Amado; Javier Santos Arrieta	Un Sol	1982	
"Ahora Que Te Vas" *	—N/a	Armando Manzanero	33	2003	
"Agora Você Pode Ir" §	—N/a	Mike Hawker; Ivor Raymonde; Luis Gómez-Escolar; Arnaldo Saccomani	Soy Como Quiero Ser (Note: Included exclusively in the version of Soy Como Quiero Ser released in Brazil.)	1987	
"Ahora Te Puedes Marchar" *	—N/a	Mike Hawker; Ivor Raymonde; Luis Gómez-Escolar	Soy Como Quiero Ser	1987	
"Al Compás del Reloj/Rip It Up/La Marcha de los Santos/Nos Vemos Cocodrillo/Lucila" *	—N/a	Max C. Freedman; Jimmy DeKnight; Robert Blackwell; John Marascalco; Robert Guidry; Albert Collins	También es Rock	1983	
"Al Que Me Siga" *	—N/a	Manuel Alejandro	Mis Romances	2001	
"Alguien Como Tu" *	—N/a	Robbie Buchanan; Luis Ángel Marquez	20 Años	1990	
"Amanecer" *	—N/a	Armando Manzanero	Romances	1997	
"Amante del amor" *	—N/a	Juan Carlos Calderón; Naomi Neville	20 Años	1990	
"Amarte Es un Placer" *	—N/a	Juan Carlos Calderón; Marcos Lifshitz (Note: A court ruling in 2007 found that "Amarte Es un Placer" had plagiarized Marcos Lifshitz's composition "Siento nuestro aliento" and was given royalties afterwards for the song.)	Amarte Es un Placer	1999	
"América, América" *	—N/a	José Luis Armenteros; Pablo Herrero	América & en Vivo	1992	
"Amor a Mares" *	—N/a	Manuel Alejandro	Cómplices	2008	
"Amor de Escola" §	—N/a	Octavio; Carlos Colla	—N/a	1982	
"Amor de Escuela" *	—N/a	Octavio	Un Sol	1982	
"Amor de Hecho" *	—N/a	Manuel Alejandro	Cómplices	2008	
"Amor, Amor, Amor" *	—N/a	Ricardo López Méndez; Gabriel Ruiz	Mis Romances	2001	
"Amorcito Corazón" *	—N/a	Jesús Camacho Villaseñor	Mis Romances	2001	
"Aviéntense Todos/Polvora/Popotitos/Presumida" *	—N/a	Eddie Cochran; Ian Samwell; Larry Williams; John Marascalco	También es Rock	1983	
"Ay, Cariño" *	—N/a	Manuel Alejandro	Cómplices	2008	
"Ayer" *	—N/a	David Foster; Jeremy Lubbock; Rudy Pérez	Aries	1993	
"Balada Para Mi Abuela" *	—N/a	King Clave	Un Sol	1982	
El Balajú *	—N/a	Pedro Galindo Galarza; Ernesto Cortazar Hernandez; José Pablo Moncayo	¡México Por Siempre!	2017	
"Bandido Cupido" *	—N/a	Honorio Herrero	Decídete	1983	
"La Barca" *	—N/a	Roberto Cantoral	Romance	1991	
"Bésame Mucho" *	—N/a	Consuelo Velázquez	Romances	1997	
"Il Bikini Blu" ‡	—N/a	Luigi Albertelli; Honorio Herrero	Canta en Italiano	1985	
"Blanca Navidad" *	—N/a	Irving Berlin; Juan Carlos Calderón	Navidades	2006	
"Bravo Amor, Bravo" *	—N/a	Manuel Alejandro	Cómplices	2008	
"El Brujo" *	—N/a	Joey Levine; Arthur Resnick; Honorio Herrero	Decídete	1983	
"O Bruxo" §	—N/a	Joey Levine; Arthur Resnick; Honorio Herrero; Carlos Colla	Decide Amor	1983	
"Campeón" *	—N/a	Honorio Herrero; Luis Gómez-Escolar	Decídete	1983	
"Campeão" §	—N/a	Honorio Herrero; Luis Gómez-Escolar; Carlos Colla	Decide Amor	1983	
"Chama-me" §	—N/a	Luis Gómez-Escolar; Honorio Herrero; Carlos Colla	Meu Sonho Perdido	1984	
"Chiamami" ‡	—N/a	Luigi Albertelli; Luis Gómez-Escolar; Honorio Herrero	Canta en Italiano	1985	
"Chica Alborotada/Confidente de Secundaria/Buen Rock Esta Noche" *	—N/a	Bob Crewe; Frank Slay; Jerry Lee Lewis; Ron Hargrave; Roy Brown	También es Rock	1983	
"La Chica del Bikini Azul" *	—N/a	Honorio Herrero	Palabra de Honor	1984	
"Il Cielo" ‡	—N/a	Toto Cutugno; Cristiano Minellono	Canta en Italiano (Note: Included exclusively in the version of Canta en Italiano released in Italy.)	1985	
"Cielo Rojo" *	—N/a	Juan Zaizar; David Zaizar	México en la Piel	2004	
"Come Fly with Me" #	Frank Sinatra	Sammy Cahn; Jimmy Van Heusen	Duets II	1994	
"Cómo" *	—N/a	Chico Novarro	Romance	1991	
"Cómo Duele" *	—N/a	Armando Manzanero	Mis Romances	2001	
"Cómo Es Posible Que a Mi Lado" *	—N/a	Ignacio "Kiko" Cibrián; Alejandro Asensi; Luis Miguel	Nada Es Igual...	1996	
"Cómo Yo Te Amé" *	—N/a	Armando Manzanero	Segundo Romance	1994	
"Cómplices" *	—N/a	Manuel Alejandro	Cómplices	2008	
"Con Tus Besos" *	—N/a	Luis Miguel; Salo Loyo; Francisco Loyo	33	2003	
"Contigo (Estar Contigo)" *	—N/a	Bebu Silvetti; Sylvia Riera Ibañez	Romances	1997	
"Contigo en la Distancia" *	—N/a	César Portillo de la Luz	Romance	1991	
"Cruz de Olvido" *	—N/a	Juán Zaizar	México en la Piel	2004	
"Cuando Calienta el Sol" *	—N/a	Rafael Pérez; Carlos Rigual; Mario Rigual; Carlos Albert Martinoli	Soy Como Quiero Ser	1987	
"Cuando Vuelva a Tu Lado" *	—N/a	María Grever	Romance	1991	
"Cuestión de Piel" *	—N/a	Juan Carlos Calderón; Luis Gómez-Escolar	20 Años	1990	
"Culpable o No (Miénteme Como Siempre)" *	—N/a	Juan Carlos Calderón	Busca una Mujer	1988	
"Dame" *	—N/a	Ignacio "Kiko" Cibrián; Alejandro Lerner	Nada Es Igual...	1996	
"Dame Tu Amor" *	—N/a	Ignacio "Kiko" Cibrián; Adrián Possé	Aries	1993	
"Danny" §	—N/a	Luis Gómez-Escolar; Honorio Herrero; Carlos Colla	Meu Sonho Perdido	1984	
"De Nuevo al Paraíso" *	—N/a	Manuel Alejandro	Cómplices	2008	
"De Que Manera de Te Olvido" *	—N/a	Federico Méndez	México en la Piel	2004	
"De Quererte Así (De T'Avoir Aimee)" *	—N/a	Charles Aznavour; Alex Marco	Romances	1997	
"De Quién Es Usted" *	—N/a	Armando Manzanero	Luis Miguel	2010	
"Decídete" *	—N/a	Honorio Herero	Decídete	1983	
"Decide Amor" §	—N/a	Honorio Herrero; Carlos Colla	Decide Amor	1983	
"Deja Que Salga la Luna" *	—N/a	José Alfredo Jiménez	¡México Por Siempre!	2017	
"Déjà Vu" *	—N/a	Edgar Cortazar; Enrique Gutierrez; Francisco Loyo	—N/a	2014	
"Devuélveme El Amor" *	—N/a	Luis Miguel; Kike Santander	33	2003	
"Un Día Más" *	—N/a	Alejandro Asensi; Ignacio "Kiko" Cibrián; Luis Miguel	Nada Es Igual...	1996	
"El Día Que Me Quieras" *	—N/a	Carlos Gardel; Alfredo Le Pera	Segundo Romance	1994	
"Los Días Felices" *	—N/a	Charles Aznavour	¡México Por Siempre!	2017	
"Dicen" *	—N/a	Manuel Alejandro	Cómplices	2008	
"Dímelo en un Beso" *	—N/a	Luis Miguel; Salo Loyo; Francisco Loyo; Victor Loyo	Amarte Es un Placer	1999	
"Directo al Corazón" *	—N/a	Ruben Amado; Javier Santos Arrieta	Directo al Corazón	1982	
"Disfraces" *	—N/a	Manuel Alejandro	Cómplices: Edición Especial	2009	
"Dormir Contigo" *	—N/a	Armando Manzanero	Amarte Es un Placer	1999	
"Échame a Mí la Culpa" *	—N/a	José Ángel Espinoza	México en la Piel	2004	
"Ella Es Así" *	—N/a	Alejandro Carballo; Edgar Cortázar; Francisco Loyo; Salo Loyo; Luis Miguel	Luis Miguel	2010	
"En Japón" *	—N/a	Honorio Herrero	Decídete	1983	
"Encadenados" *	—N/a	Carlos Arturo Briz	Romances	1997	
"Entrega Total" *	—N/a	Abelardo Pulido	México en la Piel	2004	
"Entrégate" *	—N/a	Juan Carlos Calderón	20 Años	1990	
"Era Você" §	—N/a	Juan Carlos Calderón; Arnaldo Saccomani	Soy Como Quiero Ser (Note: Included exclusively in the version of Soy Como Quiero Ser released in Brazil.)	1987	
"Eres" *	—N/a	Luis Miguel; Edgar Cortázar; Salo Loyo; Francisco Loyo	33	2003	
"Eres Tú" *	—N/a	Juan Carlos Calderón	Soy Como Quiero Ser	1987	
"Es Mejor" *	—N/a	Lamont Dozier; Eddie Holland; Brian Holland; Alejandro Monroy; Carlos Villa	Soy Como Quiero Ser	1987	
"Es por Ti" *	—N/a	Alejandro Carballo; Angel Roberto Larrañaga Flores; Héctor E. Gutiérrez; Honorio Herrero; Luis Miguel	Luis Miguel	2010	
"Esa Niña" *	—N/a	Juan Carlos Calderón	Busca una Mujer	1988	
"Esa Niña" *	—N/a	Juan Carlos Calderón	Busca una Mujer	1988	
"Ese Momento" *	—N/a	Armando Manzanero	Amarte Es un Placer	1999	
"Este Amor" *	—N/a	Luisito Rey	Fiebre de amor	1985	
"Estrenando Amor" *	—N/a	Manuel Alejandro	Cómplices	2008	
"Eu Não Posso Ficar Assim" §	—N/a	Honorio Herrero; Luis Gómez-Escolar; Carlos Colla	Decide Amor	1983	
"Eu Que Não Vivo Sem Você" §	—N/a	Pino Donaggio; Vito Pallavicini; Luis Gómez-Escolar; Arnaldo Saccomani	Soy Como Quiero Ser (Note: Included exclusively in the version of Soy Como Quiero Ser released in Brazil.)	1987	
"Eu Quero Você " §	—N/a	Honorio Herrero; Carlos Colla	Meu Sonho Perdido	1984	
"Fiebre de Amor" *	—N/a	Luisito Rey	Fiebre de amor	1985	
"La Fiesta del Mariachi" *	—N/a	José "Pepe" Martinez"	¡México Por Siempre!	2017	
"Frente la Chimenea" *	—N/a	Johnny Marks; Edgar Cortázar	Navidades	2006	
"Fría Como el Viento" *	—N/a	Juan Carlos Calderón	Busca una Mujer	1988	
"Fria Como o Vento" §	—N/a	Juan Carlos Calderón; Arnaldo Saccomani	Busca una Mujer (Note: Included exclusively in the version of Busca una Mujer released in Brazil.)	1988	
"La Gloria Eres Tú" *	—N/a	José Antonio Mendez	Romances	1997	
"Hablame" *	—N/a	Luis Gómez-Escolar; Honorio Herrero	Palabra de Honor	1984	
"Hasta el Fin" *	—N/a	Ignacio "Kiko" Cibrián	Aries	1993	
"Hasta Que Me Olvides" *	—N/a	Juan Luis Guerra	Aries	1993	
"Hasta Que Vuelvas" *	—N/a	Felipe Bojalil Garza; Mario Arturo Ramos	Mis Boleros Favoritos	2002	
"Hay un Algo" *	—N/a	Luisito Rey	Un Sol	1982	
"Historia de un Amor" *	—N/a	Carlos Eleta Almarán	Segundo Romance	1994	
"Un Hombre Busca a una Mujer" *	—N/a	Juan Carlos Calderón; Luis Gómez-Escolar	Busca una Mujer	1988	
"Hoy el Aire Huele a Ti" *	—N/a	Juan Carlos Calderón	20 Años	1990	
"A Incondicional" §	—N/a	Juan Carlos Calderón; Arnaldo Saccomani	Busca una Mujer (Note: Included exclusively in the version of Busca una Mujer released in Brazil.)	1988	
"La Incondicional" *	—N/a	Juan Carlos Calderón	Busca una Mujer	1988	
"Inolvidable" *	—N/a	Julio Gutiérrez	Romance	1991	
"Io Muoio Per Te" ‡	—N/a	Luigi Albertelli; Honorio Herrero	Canta en Italiano	1985	
"Isabel" *	—N/a	José Ramón García Flores; Juan Giralt	Palabra de Honor	1984	
"Isabel (Italian version)" ‡	—N/a	Luigi Albertelli; José Ramón García Flores; Juan Giralt	Canta en Italiano	1985	
"Juego de Amigos" *	—N/a	Miguel Angel Medina; Oscar Nicolini	Ya Nunca Más	1983	
"Júrame" *	—N/a	María Grever	Romances	1997	
"La Juventud" *	—N/a	Rubén Amado	Directo al Corazón	1982	
"Labio de Miel" *	—N/a	Alejandro Carball; Angel Roberto Larrañaga Flores; Héctor E. Gutiérre; Luis Miguel; Andrés Peláez Miranda; Angel Roberto	Luis Miguel	2010	
"Lili" *	—N/a	Luis Gómez-Escolar; Honorio Herrero	Palabra de Honor	1984	
"Lili" (Italian version) ‡	—N/a	Luigi Albertelli; Luis Gómez-Escolar; Honorio Herrero	Canta en Italiano	1985	
"Llamarda" *	—N/a	Jorge Villamil	¡México Por Siempre!	2017	
"Llegó la Navidad" *	—N/a	Felix Bernard; Richard Bernhard Smith	Navidades	2006	
"Lo Leí en Tu Diario" *	—N/a	Rubén Amado; Javier Santos Arrieta	Directo al Corazón	1982	
"Lo Que Me Gusta" *	—N/a	Alberto Aguilera Valadez	Un Sol	1982	
"Lo Que Queda de Mi" *	—N/a	Armando Manzanero	Luis Miguel	2010	
"Lupe" *	—N/a	Honorio Herrero	Decídete	1983	
Lupe (Portuguese version) §	—N/a	Honorio Herrero; Carlos Colla	Decide Amor	1983	
"Luz de Luna" *	—N/a	Álvaro Carrillo	México en la Piel	2004	
"Luz Verde" *	—N/a	Rudy Pérez	Aries	1993	
"Mamá, Mamá" *	—N/a	Luisito Rey	Ya Nunca Más	1983	
"Mañana de Carnaval (Manhã de Carnaval)" *	—N/a	Luiz Bonfá; Antonio Maria; Jesus María Arozamena	Romances	1997	
"Marcela" *	—N/a	Luisito Rey	Directo al Corazón	1982	
"Más" *	—N/a	Juan Carlos Calderón	20 Años	1990	
"Más Allá de Todo" *	—N/a	Juan Carlos Calderón	20 Años	1990	
"Me Gustas Tal Como Eres" *	Sheena Easton	Juan Carlos Calderón; Luis Gómez-Escolar	Todo Me Recuerda a Ti	1984	
"Me Muero por Ti" *	—N/a	Honorio Herrero	20 Años	1984	
"Me Niego a Estar Solo" *	—N/a	Rudy Pérez	Aries	1993	
"Meu Sonho Perdido" §	—N/a	Luis Gómez-Escolar; Honorio Herrero; Julio Seijas; Carlos Colla	Meu Sonho Perdido	1984	
"La Media Vuelta" *	—N/a	José Alfredo Jiménez	Segundo Romance	1994	
"Menina do Bikini Azul" §	—N/a	Honorio Herrero; Carlos Colla	Meu Sonho Perdido	1984	
"Mentira" *	—N/a	Alberto Aguilera Valadez	Un Sol	1982	
"Mentira" (Portuguese version) §	—N/a	Alberto Aguilera Valadez; Carlos Colla	—N/a	1982	
"México en la Piel" *	—N/a	José Manuel Fernández Espinoza	México en la Piel	2004	
"Mi Ciudad" *	—N/a	Guadalupe Trigo	México en la Piel: Edición Diamante	2005	
"Mi Humilde Oración" *	—N/a	David Foster; Linda Thompson	Navidades	2006	
"Mini Amor" *	—N/a	Luis Gómez-Escolar; Julio Seijas	Directo al Corazón	1982	
"Mini Amor" (Portuguese version) §	—N/a	Luis Gómez-Escolar; Julio Seijas; Carlos Colla	Decide Amor	1983	
"Misterios del Amor" *	—N/a	Alejandro Asensi; Francisco Loyo	Grandes Éxitos	2005	
"Motivos" *	—N/a	Italo Pizzolante	México en la Piel	2004	
"Los Muchachos de Hoy" *	—N/a	Toto Cutugno; Cristiano Minellono	Fiebre de amor	1985	
"Mujer de Fuego" *	—N/a	Alejandro Carballo; Angel Roberto Larrañaga Flore; Héctor E. Gutiérrez; Luis Miguel	Luis Miguel	2010	
"Un Mundo Raro" *	—N/a	José Alfredo Jiménez	México en la Piel	2004	
"Muñeca Rota" *	—N/a	Luis Gómez-Escolar; Honorio Herrero	Palabra de Honor	1984	
"Nada Es Igual" *	—N/a	Ignacio "Kiko" Cibrián; Alejandro Lerner	Nada Es Igual...	1996	
"Navidad, Naviad" *	—N/a	James Lord Pierpont; Juan Carlos Calderón	Navidades	2006	
"Negro es Negro/Rey Criollo/Muévanse Todos/El Rock de la Cárcel" *	—N/a	Michelle Grainger; Tony Hayes; Steve Wadey; Jerry Leiber; Mike Stoller	También es Rock	1983	
"Nena No Me Importa/Trátame Bien/Ahora o Nunca" *	—N/a	Jerry Leiber; Mike Stoller; Wally Gold; Aaron Schroeder; Eduardo di Capua	También es Rock	1983	
"No Discutamos" *	—N/a	Alberto Aguilera Valadez	¡México Por Siempre!	2017	
"No Es Permitido" *	—N/a	Nano Concha	Directo al Corazón	1982	
"No Existen Límites" *	—N/a	Alejandro Lerner; Armando Manzanero; Roberto Sorokin	Luis Miguel	2010	
"No Japão" §	—N/a	Honorio Herrero; Carlos Colla	Decide Amor	1983	
"No Me Amenaces" *	—N/a	José Alfredo Jiménez	¡México Por Siempre!	2017	
"No Me Fío" *	—N/a	Luis Miguel; Francisco Loyo; Salo Loyo; Victor Loyo	Amarte Es un Placer	1999	
"No Me Platiques Más" *	—N/a	Vicente Garrido	Romance	1991	
"No Me Puedes Dejar Así" *	—N/a	Luis Gómez-Escolar; Honorio Herrero	Decídete	1983	
"No Me Puedo Escapar de Ti" *	Rocío Banquells	Juan Carlos Calderón	Soy Como Quiero Ser	1987	
"No Sé Tú" *	—N/a	Armando Manzanero	Romance	1991	
"Noche de Paz" *	—N/a	Joseph Mohr; Juan Carlos Calderón	Navidades	2006	
"Noche de Ronda" *	—N/a	Agustín Lara	Romances	1997	
"Noi Ragazzi Di Oggi" ‡	—N/a	Toto Cutugno; Cristiano Minellono	Canta en Italiano	1985	
"Nos Hizo Falta Tiempo" *	—N/a	Armando Manzanero	33	2003	
"Nosotros" *	—N/a	Pedro Junco	Segundo Romance	1994	
"Nosotros Dos" *	—N/a	Oscar Nicolini	Directo al Corazón	1982	
"O Que Eu Gosto" §	—N/a	Alberto Aguilera Valadez; Carlos Colla	—N/a	1982	
"O Tú o Ninguna" *	—N/a	Juan Carlos Calderón	Amarte Es un Placer	1999	
"Ora Pronobis" *	—N/a	Luisito Rey	Ya Nunca Más	1983	
"Oro de Ley" *	—N/a	Juan Carlos Calderón	20 Años	1990	
"Palabra de Honor" *	—N/a	Luis Gómez-Escolar; Honorio Herrero; Julio Seijas	Palabra de Honor	1984	
"Paloma Querida" *	—N/a	José Alfredo Jiménez	México en la Piel	2004	
"Parola d' Onore" ‡	—N/a	Luigi Albertelli; Luis Gómez-Escolar; Honorio Herrero; Julio Seijas	Canta en Italiano	1985	
"Pensar en Ti" *	—N/a	Francisco Fabián Céspedes	Aries	1993	
"Perdóname" *	—N/a	Eric Carmen; Carlos Toro	Soy Como Quiero Ser	1987	
"Perfidia" *	—N/a	Alberto Domínguez	Mis Romances	2001	
"Perro Callejero/No Seas Cruel/Osito Teddy/Estremécete" *	—N/a	Jerry Leiber; Mike Stoller; Otis Blackwell; Kal Mann; Bernie Lowe	También es Rock	1983	
"Por Debajo de la Mesa" *	—N/a	Armando Manzanero	Romances	1997	
"Por Favor Señora" *	—N/a	Juan Carlos Calderón	Busca una Mujer	1988	
"¿Por Qué Te Conocí?" *	—N/a	Juan Bruno Tarraza Montalvan	¡México Por Siempre!	2017	
"Por un Amor" *	—N/a	Gilberto Parra	México en la Piel: Edición Diamante	2005	
"El Primero" *	—N/a	Juan Carlos Calderón; Luis Gómez-Escolar	Busca una Mujer	1988	
"La Puerta" *	—N/a	Luis Demetrio	Romance	1991	
"Pupilas de Gato" *	—N/a	Luna Fría	Busca una Mujer	1988	
"Que Bonito Es Mi Tierra" *	—N/a	Rubén Fuentes Gasson; Mario Molina Montes	¡México Por Siempre!	2017	
"Qué Hacer" *	—N/a	Edgar Cortázar; Ernesto Cortázar; Luis Miguel	33	2003	
"Que Nivel de Mujer" *	—N/a	Emilio Castillo; Orlando Castro; Stephen "Doc" Kupka	Aries	1993	
"¿Qué Sabes Tú?" *	—N/a	Myrta Silva	Mis Romances	2001	
"Que Te Vaya Bonito" *	—N/a	Jose "Pepe" Martinez	¡México Por Siempre!	2017	
"Que Tristeza" *	—N/a	Armando Manzanero	33	2003	
"Que Tú Te Vas" *	—N/a	Francisco Fabián Céspedes	Nada Es Igual...	1996	
"Quiero" *	—N/a	Alejandro Asensi; Roland Kortbawi; Francisco Loyo; Luis Miguel	Amarte Es un Placer	1999	
"Il Re Di Cuori" ‡	—N/a	Luigi Albertelli; Honorio Herrero; Luis Gómez-Escolar	Canta en Italiano	1985	
"Recuerdos Encadenados" *	—N/a	Ruben Amado; Javier Santos Arrieta	Directo al Corazón	1982	
"Rei, Rei, Rei" §	—N/a	Luis Gómez-Escolar; Honorio Herrero; Carlos Colla	Meu Sonho Perdido	1984	
"El Reloj" *	—N/a	Roberto Cantoral	Romances	1997	
"Rey de Corazónes" *	—N/a	Luis Gómez-Escolar; Honorio Herrero	Palabra de Honor	1984	
"Un Rock and Roll Sonó" *	—N/a	Juan Carlos Calderón; Honorio Herrero	Palabra de Honor	1984	
"Um Rock & Roll Tocou" §	—N/a	Juan Carlos Calderón; Honorio Herrero; Carlos Colla	Meu Sonho Perdido	1984	
"Un Rock Suono" ‡	—N/a	Luigi Albertelli; Juan Carlos Calderón; Luis Gómez-Escolar	Canta en Italiano	1985	
"Rock de la Niña Cruel" *	—N/a	Rubén Amado; Javier Santos Arrieta	Directo al Corazón	1982	
"Sabes una Cosa" *	—N/a	Rubén Fuentes	México en la Piel	2004	
"Sabor a Mí" *	—N/a	Álvaro Carrillo	Romances	1997	
"Safari" *	—N/a	Luis Gómez-Escolar; Julio Seijas	Decídete	1983	
"Salva-me" §	—N/a	José Ramón García Flores; Juan Giralt; Carlos Colla	Meu Sonho Perdido	1984	
"Santa Claus Llegó a la Ciudad" *	—N/a	John Frederick Coots; Haven Gillespie; Juan Carlos Calderón	Navidades	2006	
"Se Amaban" *	—N/a	Manuel Alejandro	Cómplices	2008	
"Separados" *	—N/a	Juan Carlos Calderón; Luis Gómez-Escolar	Busca una Mujer	1988	
"Será Que No Me Amas" *	—N/a	Mick Jackson; Dave Jackson; Elmar Krohn; Juan Carlos Calderón	20 Años	1990	
"Serenata Huasteca" *	—N/a	José Alfredo Jiménez	¡México Por Siempre!	2017	
"Si la Ves a Mi Chica, Dile Que la Amo" *	—N/a	Rubén Amad; Javier Santos Arrieta	Directo al Corazón	1982	
"Si Te Perdiera" *	—N/a	Manuel Alejandro	Grandes Éxitos	2005	
"Si Te Vas" *	—N/a	Ignacio "Kiko" Cibrian; Orlando Castro; Salvador Tercero	Nada Es Igual...	1996	
"Si Tú Te Atreves" *	—N/a	Manuel Alejandro	Cómplices	2008	
"Siempre Me Quedo, Siempre Me Voy" *	—N/a	Luisito Rey	Fiebre de amor	1985	
"Siento" *	—N/a	Edgar Cortázar; Francisco Loyo; Luis Miguel	Luis Miguel	2010	
"El Siete Mares" *	—N/a	José Alfredo Jiménez	¡México Por Siempre!	2017	
"Sin Hablar" *	Laura Branigan	Juan Carlos Calderón	Soy Como Quiero Ser	1987	
"Sin Sangre en las Venas" *	—N/a	Rubén Fuentes Gasson; Mario Molina Montes	¡México Por Siempre!	2017	
"Sin Ti" *	—N/a	Pepe Guízar	Segundo Romance	1994	
"Sin Ti, Por Ti" *	—N/a	Honorio Herrero	Fiebre de amor	1985	
"Sintiéndote Lejos" *	—N/a	Ignacio "Kiko" Cibrián; Gerardo Flores; Salo Loyo	Nada Es Igual...	1996	
"Sol, Arena y Mar" *	—N/a	Luis Miguel; Arturo Pérez; Francisco Loyo; Salo Loyo	Amarte Es un Placer	1999	
"Solamente una Vez" *	—N/a	Agustín Lara	Segundo Romance	1994	
"Sólo Tú" *	—N/a	Buck Ram; Carlos Toro	Soy Como Quiero Ser	1987	
"Somos Novios" *	—N/a	Armando Manzanero	Segundo Romance	1994	
"Sonríe" *	—N/a	Charles Chaplin	Navidades	2006	
"Soy Cómo Quiero Ser" *	—N/a	Luisito Rey	Soy Como Quiero Ser	1987	
"Soy Cómo Soy" *	—N/a	Jose Ramon Florez; Joe López	Decídete	1983	
"Sou Como Sou" §	—N/a	Jose Ramon Florez; Joe López; Carlos Colla	Decide Amor	1983	
"Soy Lo Prohibido" *	—N/a	Roberto Cantoral; Francisco Dino Lopez Ramos	¡México Por Siempre!	2017	
"Soy un Perdedor" *	—N/a	Tito Duarte	Busca una Mujer	1988	
"Suave" *	—N/a	Orlando Castro; Ignacio "Kiko" Cibrián	Aries	1993	
"Sueña" *	—N/a	Stephen Schwartz; Luis Miguel; Ignacio "Kiko" Cibrián; Gerardo Flores; Renato López; Alan Menken	El Jorobado de Notre Dame: Banda Sonora en Español	1996	
"Sueños" *	—N/a	Luisito Rey	Fiebre de amor	1985	
"Sunny" *	—N/a	Bobby Hebb; Luis Gómez-Escolar	Soy Como Quiero Ser	1987	
"Susy Q/Memphis/ Música de Rock and Roll" *	—N/a	Dale Hawkins; Robert Chaisson; Stan Lewis; Eleanor Broadwater; Chuck Berry	También es Rock	1983	
"Tal Vez Me Mientes" *	—N/a	Larrañaga Flores; Francisco Loyo; Luis Miguel; Angel Roberto	Luis Miguel	2010	
"Un Te Amo" *	—N/a	Armando Manzanero	33	2003	
"Te Desean" *	—N/a	Manuel Alejandro	Cómplices	2008	
"Te Deseo Muy Felices Fiestas" *	—N/a	Hugh Martin; Ralph Blane; Juan Carlos Calderón	Navidades	2006	
"Te Extraño" *	—N/a	Armando Manzanero	Romance	1991	
"Te Necesito" *	—N/a	Juan Luis Guerra	33	2003	
"Te Propongo Esta Noche" *	—N/a	Alejandro Asensi; Juan Carlos Calderón; Luis Miguel; Arturo Pérez	Amarte Es un Placer	1999	
"Tengo Todo Excepto a Ti" *	—N/a	Juan Carlos Calderón	20 Años	1990	
"El Tiempo" *	—N/a	Luisito Rey	Un Sol	1982	
"El Tiempo Que Te Quede Libre" *	—N/a	José Ángel Espinoza	Mis Romances	2001	
"Toda una Vida" *	—N/a	Osvaldo Farrés	Mis Romances	2001	
"Todo el Amor del Mundo" *	Lucero (Note: Credited as Lucerito)	Luisito Rey	Fiebre de amor	1985	
"Todo Para Ti" *	The All Stars	Michael Jackson; Rubén Blades	—N/a	2001	
"Todo Por Su Amor" *	—N/a	Manuel Lopez; Rudy Pérez	Nada Es Igual...	1996	
"Todo y Nada" *	—N/a	Vicente Garrido	Segundo Romance	1994	
"Tomemos los Patines" *	—N/a	Maurizio Fabrizio; Riccardo Fogli; Guido Morra; Miguel A. Medina	Un Sol	1982	
"Tres Palabras" *	—N/a	Osvaldo Farrés	Luis Miguel	2010	
"Tu di Couri Nonne Hai" ‡	—N/a	Honorio Herrero	Canta en Italiano	1985	
"Tu Imaginación" *	—N/a	Manuel Alejandro; Pepe Dougan; Victor Feijóo	Cómplices	2008	
"Tú Me Acostumbraste" *	—N/a	Frank Domínguez	Mis Romances	2001	
"Tu Mirada" *	—N/a	Alejandro Asensi; Luis Miguel; Francisco Loyo	Amarte Es un Placer	1999	
"Tu" §	—N/a	Honorio Herrero; Carlos Colla	Meu Sonho Perdido	1984	
"Tú No Tienes Corazón" *	—N/a	Honorio Herrero	Palabra de Honor	1984	
"Tú, Sólo Tú" *	—N/a	Luis Miguel; Arturo Pérez	Amarte Es un Placer	1999	
"Tú y Yo" *	—N/a	Jorge Calandrelli; Rudy Pérez	Aries	1993	
"La Última Noche" *	—N/a	Bobby Collazo	Mis Romances	2001	
"Um Mais Um – Dois Apaixonados" §	—N/a	Rubén Amado; Javier Santos Arrieta; Carlos Colla	—N/a	1982	
"Uno" *	—N/a	Enrique Santos Discépolo; Mariano Mores	Romances	1997	
"Usted" *	—N/a	Gabriel Ruiz; Monis Zorrilla	Romance	1991	
"Va a Nevar" *	—N/a	Jule Styne; Sammy Cahn	Navidades	2006	
"El Viajero" *	—N/a	Roberto Sierra	México en la Piel	2004	
"Volver" *	—N/a	Alfredo Le Pera; Carlos Gardel	Mis Romances	2001	
"Voy a Apagar la Luz/Contingo Aprendí" *	—N/a	Armando Manzanero	Romances	1997	
"Vuelve" *	—N/a	Alejandro Asensi; Edgar Cortázar; Francisco Loyo; Luis Miguel	33	2003	
"Y Sigo" *	—N/a	Luis Miguel; Kike Santander	33	2003	
"Ya Nunca Más" *	—N/a	Luisito Rey	Ya Nunca Más	1983	
"Yo Que No Vivo Sin Ti" *	—N/a	Pino Donaggio; Vito Pallavicini; Luis Gómez-Escolar	Soy Como Quiero Ser	1987	
"Yo Sé Que Volverás" *	—N/a	Armando Manzanero; Luis Pérez Sabido	Segundo Romance	1994	

== See also ==
- Luis Miguel discography
