= Luis Miguel singles discography =

List of singles by Luis Miguel

Mexican singer Luis Miguel has released 89 singles as lead artist.

== Singles ==
=== 1980s ===
List of singles, with selected chart positions and certifications, showing year released and album name
Year	Title	Peak chart positions						Certifications	Album
Year	Title	US Latin	MEX (Note: In Mexico, chart positions shown were published in Notitas Musicales magazine with data provided by Radio Mil.)	ARG (Note: In Argentina, in the 1980s, chart positions shown were published in Cashbox's "International Bestsellers".)	BRA	ITA	BEL	Certifications	Album
1982	"1 + 1 = 2 Enamorados"	—	1	4	—	—	—		Un sol
1982	"Mentira"	—	2	—	—	—	—		Un sol
1982	"Um Mais Um - Dois Apaixonados"	—	—	—	—	—	—	ABPD: Gold	Decide Amor
1982	"Mentira" (Portuguese version)	—	—	—	—	—	—		Decide Amor
1982	"Directo Al Corazón"	—	1	1	—	—	—		Directo al corazón
1983	"Recuerdos Encadenados"	—	—	10	—	—	—		Directo al corazón
1983	"Popurrí De Rock"	—	7	7	—	—	—		También es Rock
1983	"Decídete"	—	2	1	—	—	—		Decídete
1984	"No Me Puedes Dejar Así"	—	4	—	—	—	—		Decídete
1984	"Ya Nunca Más"	—	—	1	—	—	—		Ya Nunca Más
1984	"Palabra De Honor"	—	1	3	—	—	—		Palabra De Honor
1984	"Me Gustas Tal Como Eres" (featuring Sheena Easton)	—	9	—	—	—	—	AMPROFON: Gold	Palabra De Honor
1985	"Isabel"	—	2	—	—	—	—		Palabra De Honor
1985	"Noi Ragazzi Di Oggi"	—	—	—	—	1	37		Noi Ragazzi Di Oggi
1985	"Los Muchachos De Hoy"	—	3	2	—	—	—		Fiebre De Amor
1987	"Ahora Te Puedes Marchar"	1	1	—	—	—	—	PROMUSICAE: Platinum	Soy Como Quiero Ser
1987	"No Me Puedo Escapar de Ti" (featuring Rocío Banquells)	14	—	—	—	—	—		Soy Como Quiero Ser
1988	"Soy Como Quiero Ser"	36	—	—	—	—	—		Soy Como Quiero Ser
1988	"Cuando Calienta El Sol"	50	9	—	—	—	—		Soy Como Quiero Ser
1988	"Yo Que No Vivo Sin Ti"	26	—	—	—	—	—		Soy Como Quiero Ser
1989	"La Incondicional"	1	1	—	—	—	—	AMPROFON: Gold; PROMUSICAE: Platinum	Busca Una Mujer
1989	"Fría Como el Viento"	1	4	—	—	—	—		Busca Una Mujer
1989	"Un Hombre Busca a Una Mujer"	5	7	—	—	—	—		Busca Una Mujer
1989	"Separados"	8	—	—	—	—	—		Busca Una Mujer
1989	"Culpable O No"	22	1	—	—	—	—		Busca Una Mujer
"—" denotes the single failed to chart or not released

=== 1990s ===
List of singles, with selected chart positions and certifications, showing year released and album name
Year	Title	Peak chart positions					Certifications	Album
Year	Title	US Latin	US Latin Pop	US Tropical	US Regional Mex	MEX	Certifications	Album
1990	"Esa Niña"	35	—	—	—	—		Busca Una Mujer
1990	"Tengo Todo Excepto a Ti"	1	—	—	—	1		20 Años
1990	"Entrégate"	1	—	—	—	2		20 Años
1991	"Amante del amor"	4	—	—	—	10		20 Años
1991	"Inolvidable"	1	—	—	—	1		Romance
1992	"No Se Tú"	1	—	—	—	1	PROMUSICAE: Gold	Romance
1992	"Contigo en la Distancia"	—	—	—	—	13		Romance
1992	"Como"	4	—	—	—	—		Romance
1992	"Mucho Corazón"	3	—	—	—	—		Romance
1992	"America, America"	20	—	—	—	1		América & En Vivo
1993	"Ayer"	1	—	—	—	1		Aries
1993	"Hasta Que Me Olvides"	1	—	—	—	1	PROMUSICAE: Gold	Aries
1993	"Suave"	9	—	—	—	1		Aries
1994	"Pensar en Ti"	—	—	—	—	1		Aries
1994	"Hasta el Fin"	4	—	—	—	—		Aries
1994	"Tu y Yo"	4	—	—	—	—		Aries
1994	"El Dia Que Me Quieras"	1	1	—	—	1		Segundo Romance
1994	"La Media Vuelta"	1	1	8	11	1	PROMUSICAE: Gold	Segundo Romance
1995	"Delirio"	16	6	—	—	—		Segundo Romance
1995	"Todo y Nada"	3	1	9	—	—		Segundo Romance
1995	"Si Nos Dejan"	1	2	2	1	—		El Concierto
1995	"Amanecí En Tus Brazos"	3	3	—	4	—		El Concierto
1996	"Dame"	2	1	3	—	—		Nada Es Igual...
1996	"Cómo Es Posible Que a Mi Lado"	10	6	—	—	—		Nada Es Igual...
1996	"Sueña"	3	1	7	—	—		Nada Es Igual...
1997	"Que Tu Te Vas"	6	5	13	—	—		Nada Es Igual...
1997	"Por Debajo de la Mesa"	1	1	3	—	—	PROMUSICAE: Gold	Romances
1997	"Contigo (Estar Contigo)"	2	2	7	—	—		Romances
1997	"El Reloj"	2	1	9	15	—		Romances
1998	"De Quererte Asi (De T'Avoir Aimee)"	23	16	—	—	—		Romances
1998	"Sabor a Mi"	6	3	—	—	—		Romances
1999	"Sol, Arena y Mar"	3	2	12	—	—		Amarte Es Un Placer
1999	"O Tú o Ninguna"	1	1	3	—	—		Amarte Es Un Placer
"—" denotes the single failed to chart or not released

=== 2000s ===
List of singles, with selected chart positions and certifications, showing year released and album name
Year	Title	Peak chart positions						Certifications	Album
Year	Title	US Latin	US Latin Pop	US Tropical	US Regional Mex	MEX	MEX Español	Certifications	Album
2000	"Amarte Es Un Placer"	6	5	9	—	—	—		Amarte Es Un Placer
2000	"Dormir Contigo"	11	2	25	—	—	—		Amarte Es Un Placer
2000	"La Bikina"	2	3	9	—	—	—		Vivo
2000	"Y"	8	8	18	—	—	—		Vivo
2001	"Amor, Amor, Amor"	13	7	13	—	—	—		Mis Romances
2001	"Como Duele"	1	1	5	—	—	—		Mis Romances
2002	"Al Que Me Siga"	21	12	30	—	—	—		Mis Romances
2002	"Hasta Que Vuelvas"	16	7	21	—	—	—		Mis Boleros Favoritos
2003	"Te Necesito"	1	1	28	—	—	—		33
2004	"Un Te Amo"	30	20	—	—	—	—		33
2004	"El Viajero"	—	—	—	—	—	—		Mexico En La Piel (and Edición Diamante)
2004	"Que Seas Feliz"	3	3	38	27	—	—		Mexico En La Piel (and Edición Diamante)
2005	"Échame A Mí La Culpa"	18	13	—	—	—	—		Mexico En La Piel (and Edición Diamante)
2005	"Sabes Una Cosa"	8	9	—	9	—	—		Mexico En La Piel (and Edición Diamante)
2005	"Mi Ciudad"	—	—	—	—	—	—		Mexico En La Piel (and Edición Diamante)
2005	"Misterios del Amor"	29	8	—	—	—	—		Grandes Éxitos
2006	"Si Te Perdiera"	47	20	—	—	—	—		Grandes Éxitos
2006	"Mi Humilde Oracion"	—	31	—	—	—	—		Navidades
2006	"Santa Claus Llego A La Ciudad"	—	26	—	—	—	—		Navidades
2008	"Si Tú Te Atreves"	11	4	—	25	—	—	AMPROFON: Gold	Cómplices
2008	"Te Desean"	—	—	—	—	—	—		Cómplices
2008	"Amor De Hecho"	—	—	—	—	12	16		Cómplices
2009	"Será Que No Me Amas (Hex Hector Mix)"	—	—	—	—	17	15		No Culpes a La Noche
2009	"Eres (Dario Gomez & Vlad Diaz Mix)"	—	—	—	—	—	—		No Culpes a La Noche
"—" denotes the single failed to chart or not released

=== 2010s ===
List of singles, with selected chart positions and certifications, showing year released and album name
Year	Title	Peak chart positions				Album
Year	Title	US Latin	US Latin Pop	MEX	MEX Español	Album
2010	"Labios de Miel"	31	10	1	2	Luis Miguel
2011	"Mujer De Fuego"	—	—	18	10	Luis Miguel
2014	"Déjà Vu"	—	—	—	39	Non-album single
2017	"La Fiesta Del Mariachi"	—	—	33	19	¡México Por Siempre!
2017	"Llamarada"	—	—	14	6	¡México Por Siempre!
2018	"Soy Lo Prohibido"	—	—	—	21	¡México Por Siempre!
2018	"No Discutamos"	—	—	—	29	¡México Por Siempre!
"—" denotes the single failed to chart or not released

== See also ==
- Luis Miguel albums discography
