= Deja Vu Tour =

2014–15 series of concerts by Luis Miguel

- World tour by Luis Miguel
- Associated album: Luis Miguel; "Deja Vu"
- Start date: 12 September 2014
- End date: 12 December 2015
- Legs: 4
- No. of shows: 63 in North America; 25 in South America; 88 total

Luis Miguel concert chronology
- The Hits Tour (2012–13); Deja Vu Tour (2014–15); México Por Siempre Tour (2018–19)

The Deja Vu Tour, previously named as The Hits Tour during 2014 (as in 2012–2013), is a series of concerts performed by Mexican artist Luis Miguel to perform a brand new setlist consisting of his earliest hits (80's and 90's) as well as his most recent hits included in productions such as México En La Piel (2004) and Luis Miguel (2010). Even though, in 2014 the USA Tour advertising mentioned it as "Tour 2014" and the Sudamerican advertising as "The Show" these were not the tour official names. Along with the tour start date (September 12, 2014) the single "Deja Vu" came out, it can be inferred that this is the reason why the tour was renamed as "Deja Vu".

== History ==
This tour began in Las Vegas with four concerts as part of the celebration of the proclamation of independence of Mexico. He appeared in the following cities: Phoenix, San Diego, Inglewood and Oakland for a total of nine concerts in United States. Then travels to Mexico to present themselves for first time in the "Palenque" of Guadalajara with four shows.

In October returns to Chile (Santiago and Viña del Mar), Argentina (Buenos Aires, Rosario, Córdoba, Mendoza, Tucumán and Posadas) and Paraguay for a total of 16 presentations. In January 2015 begins its season of concerts in Mexico.

== Set list ==
(names taken from the official Staff list)

El Show Tour: (9 shows) Sep/12/2014 - Sep/21/2014

El Show Tour : (9 shows) Sep/12/2014 – Sep/21/2014
| No. | Title | Original album | Length |
|---|---|---|---|
| 1. | "Intro (Trumpet) / Quién Será" |
| 2. | "Tú Solo Tú" | Amarte Es Un Placer |
| 3. | "Medley" (Dame Tu Amor / Sol, Arena Y Mar / Suave) | Aries, Amarte Es Un Placer |
| 4. | "Amor, Amor, Amor" | Mis Romances |
| 5. | "Que Tú Te Vas" | Nada Es Igual |
| 6. | "Medley" (Todo Y Nada / Sabor A Mí / Sin Tí) | Segundo Romance, Romances |
| 7. | "Medley" (Por Debajo De La Mesa / La Gloria Eres Tú / Bésame Mucho) | Romances |
| 8. | "Medley" (Pupilas De Gato / Alguien Como Tú) | Busca Una Mujer, 20 Años |
| 9. | "Medley" (Hoy El Aire Huele a Ti / Siento / Más / Sintiéndote Lejos) | 20 Años, Luis Miguel, Nada Es Igual |
| 10. | "Esa Niña" | Busca Una Mujer |
| 11. | "Medley (excluded in Vegas September 12th, Inglewood and Oakland)" (Amante del Amor / Más Allá de Todo / Fría Como el Viento / Tengo Todo Excepto a Ti / La Incondicional) | 20 Años, Busca Una Mujer, |
| 12. | "Interlude (Saxofon) / Hasta Que Me Olvides" | Aries |
| 13. | "Te Necesito" | 33 |
| 14. | "Y Sigo" | 33 |
| 15. | "Medley" (Mucho Corazón / La Media Vuelta / Amorcito Corazón) | Romance, Segundo Romance, Mis Romances |
| 16. | "Intro (Mariachi) / El Son De La Negra" |
| 17. | "Intro (Mariachi) / El Viajero" | México En La Piel |
| 18. | "La Bikina" | Vivo |
| 19. | "Medley" (Si Nos Dejan / Échame A Mí La Culpa / Sabes Una Cosa) | El Concierto, México En La Piel |
| 20. | "Amanecí Entre Tus Brazos" | El Concierto |
| 21. | "México En La Piel" | México En La Piel |
| 22. | "Medley" (Cielito Lindo / Que Bonita Es Mi Tierra / Viva México, Viva América) |
| 23. | "El Rey" | El Concierto |
| 24. | "Medley" (Separados / 1+1 = Dos Enamorados / Directo Al Corazon) | Busca Una Mujer, Un sol, Directo al corazón |
| 25. | "Medley" (Vuelve / Eres / Como Es Posible Que A Mi Lado / Será Que No Me Amas / Te Propongo Esta Noche)/ Te Propongo Esta Noche (Reprise) | 33, Nada Es Igual, 20 Años, Amarte Es Un Placer |

Fiestas de Octubre Tour: (4 shows) Oct/09/2014 - Oct/12/2014

Fiestas de Octubre Tour : (4 shows) Oct/09/2014 – Oct/12/2014
| No. | Title | Original album | Length |
|---|---|---|---|
| 1. | "Intro (Trumpet) / Quién Será" |
| 2. | "Tú Solo Tú" | Amarte Es Un Placer |
| 3. | "Medley" (Dame Tu Amor / Sol, Arena Y Mar / Suave) | Aries, Amarte Es Un Placer |
| 4. | "Amor, Amor, Amor" | Mis Romances |
| 5. | "Medley" (Mucho Corazón / La Media Vuelta / Amorcito Corazón) | Romance, Segundo Romance, Mis Romances |
| 6. | "Intro (Mariachi) / El Son De La Negra" |
| 7. | "Intro (Mariachi) / El Viajero" | México En La Piel |
| 8. | "La Bikina" | Vivo |
| 9. | "Sabes Una Cosa Medley" (Si Nos Dejan / Échame A Mí La Culpa / Sabes Una Cosa) | El Concierto, México En La Piel |
| 10. | "Amanecí Entre Tus Brazos" | El Concierto |
| 11. | "De Que Manera te Olvido" | México En La Piel |
| 12. | "Fallaste Corazón" |
| 13. | "México En La Piel" | México En La Piel |
| 14. | "Mi Ciudad" | México En La Piel |
| 15. | "Cielito Lindo Medley" (Cielito Lindo / Que Bonita Es Mi Tierra / Viva México, Viva América) |
| 16. | "El Rey" | El Concierto |
| 17. | "Medley" (Vuelve / Eres / Como Es Posible Que A Mi Lado / Será Que No Me Amas / Te Propongo Esta Noche) | 33, Nada Es Igual, 20 Años, Amarte Es Un Placer |
| 18. | "Labios de Miel / Reprise" | Luis Miguel |

El Show Tour: (16 shows) Oct/15/2014 - Nov/08/2014

El Show Tour : (16 shows) Oct/15/2014 – Nov/08/2014
| No. | Title | Original album | Length |
|---|---|---|---|
| 1. | "Intro (Trumpet) / Quién Será" |
| 2. | "Tú Solo Tú" | Amarte Es Un Placer |
| 3. | "Medley" (Dame Tu Amor / Sol, Arena Y Mar / Suave) | Aries, Amarte Es Un Placer |
| 4. | "Amor, Amor, Amor" | Mis Romances |
| 5. | "Que Tú Te Vas" | Nada Es Igual |
| 6. | "Medley" (Todo Y Nada / Sabor A Mí / Sin Tí) | Segundo Romance, Romances |
| 7. | "Medley" (Por Debajo De La Mesa / La Gloria Eres Tú / Bésame Mucho) | Romances |
| 8. | "Medley" (Pupilas De Gato / Alguien Como tu) | Busca Una Mujer, 20 Años |
| 9. | "Medley" (Hoy El Aire Huele a Ti / Siento / Más / Sintiéndote Lejos) | 20 Años, Luis Miguel, Nada Es Igual |
| 10. | "Esa Niña" | Busca Una Mujer |
| 11. | "Medley" (Amante del Amor / Más Allá de Todo / Fría Como el Viento / Tengo Todo Excepto a Ti / La Incondicional) | 20 Años, Busca Una Mujer |
| 12. | "Intro (Saxophone) / Medley" (Yo Que No Vivo Sin Ti / Culpable o No) | Soy Como Quiero Ser, Busca Una Mujer, |
| 13. | "Hasta Que me Olvides" | Aries |
| 14. | "Te Necesito" | 33 |
| 15. | "Y Sigo" | 33 |
| 16. | "Medley" (Separados / 1+1 = Dos Enamorados / Directo Al Corazon) | Busca Una Mujer, Un sol, Directo al corazón |
| 17. | "Medley" (Vuelve / Eres / Como Es Posible Que A Mi Lado / Será Que No Me Amas / Te Propongo Esta Noche / Reprise) | 33, Nada Es Igual, 20 Años, Amarte Es Un Placer |
| 18. | "Medley" (Decídete / Muchachos de Hoy / Ahora Te Puedes Marchar / La Chica Del Bikini Azul / Isabel / Cuando Calienta El Sol (Only Rosario, Argentina)) | Decídete, Fiebre De Amor, Soy Como Quiero Ser, Palabra De Honor |
| 19. | "Dejá Vú (Only Argentina and Paraguay)" |
| 20. | "Labios de Miel / Reprise" | Luis Miguel |

Fiesta de Año Nuevo de Nuevo León: (1 show) Dec/31/2014

Fiesta de Año Nuevo de Nuevo León : (1 show) Dec/31/2014
| No. | Title | Original album | Length |
|---|---|---|---|
| 1. | "Intro (Trumpet) / Quién Será" |
| 2. | "Tú Solo Tú" | Amarte Es Un Placer |
| 3. | "Medley" (Dame Tu Amor / Sol, Arena Y Mar / Suave) | Aries, Amarte Es Un Placer |
| 4. | "Amor, Amor, Amor" | Mis Romances |
| 5. | "Que Tú Te Vas" | Nada Es Igual |
| 6. | "Medley" (Todo Y Nada / Sabor A Mí / Sin Tí) | Segundo Romance, Romances |
| 7. | "Medley" (Por Debajo De La Mesa / La Gloria Eres Tú / Bésame Mucho) | Romances |
| 8. | "Medley" (Pupilas De Gato / Alguien Como tu) | Busca Una Mujer, 20 Años |
| 9. | "Medley" (Hoy El Aire Huele a Ti / Siento / Más / Sintiéndote Lejos) | 20 Años, Luis Miguel, Nada Es Igual |
| 10. | "Esa Niña" | Busca Una Mujer |
| 11. | "Medley" (Amante del Amor / Más Allá de Todo / Fría Como el Viento / Tengo Todo Excepto a Ti / La Incondicional) | 20 Años, Busca Una Mujer |
| 12. | "Intro (Saxophone) / Medley" (Yo Que No Vivo Sin Ti / Culpable o No) | Soy Como Quiero Ser, Busca Una Mujer, |
| 13. | "Hasta Que me Olvides" | Aries |
| 14. | "Te Necesito" | 33 |
| 15. | "Medley" (Mucho Corazón / La Media Vuelta / Amorcito Corazón) | Romance, Segundo Romance, Mis Romances |
| 16. | "Intro (Mariachi) / El Son De La Negra" |
| 17. | "Intro (Mariachi) / El Viajero" | México En La Piel |
| 18. | "Medley" (Si Nos Dejan / Échame A Mí La Culpa / Sabes Una Cosa) | El Concierto, México En La Piel |
| 19. | "Medley" (Cielito Lindo / Que Bonita Es Mi Tierra / Viva México, Viva América) |
| 20. | "Medley" (Separados / 1+1 = Dos Enamorados / Directo Al Corazon) | Busca Una Mujer, Un sol, Directo al corazón |
| 21. | "Medley" (Vuelve / Eres / Como Es Posible Que A Mi Lado / Será Que No Me Amas / Te Propongo Esta Noche / Reprise) | 33, Nada Es Igual, 20 Años, Amarte Es Un Placer |
| 22. | "Dejá Vú" |
| 23. | "Santa Claus Llegó a la Ciudad" | Navidades |
| 24. | "Frente a la Chimenea" | Navidades |
| 25. | "Labios de Miel / Reprise" | Luis Miguel |

Dejá Vu Tour: (29 shows) Jan/27/2015 - Mar/28/2015

Dejá Vu Tour : (29 shows) Jan/27/2015 – Mar/28/2015
| No. | Title | Original album | Length |
|---|---|---|---|
| 1. | "Intro (Trumpet) / Quién Será" |
| 2. | "Tú Solo Tú" | Amarte Es Un Placer |
| 3. | "Medley" (Dame Tu Amor / Sol, Arena Y Mar / Suave) | Aries, Amarte Es Un Placer |
| 4. | "Amor, Amor, Amor" | Mis Romances |
| 5. | "Que Tú Te Vas" | Nada Es Igual |
| 6. | "Medley" (Todo Y Nada / Sabor A Mí / Sin Tí) | Segundo Romance, Romances |
| 7. | "O Tú O Ninguna" | Amarte Es Un Placer |
| 8. | "Somos Novios (Sometimes)" | Segundo Romance |
| 9. | "Contigo en la Distancia (Sometimes)" | Romance |
| 10. | "Medley (Only Puebla)" (Por Debajo De La Mesa / La Gloria Eres Tú / Bésame Mucho (Sometimes)) | Romances |
| 11. | "Medley (Only Puebla)" (Pupilas De Gato / Alguien Como tu (Sometimes)) | Busca Una Mujer, 20 Años |
| 12. | "Medley (Sometimes)" (Hoy El Aire Huele a Ti / Siento / Más / Sintiéndote Lejos) | 20 Años, Luis Miguel, Nada Es Igual |
| 13. | "Esa Niña" | Busca Una Mujer |
| 14. | "Medley" (Amante del Amor / Más Allá de Todo / Fría Como el Viento / Tengo Todo Excepto a Ti / La Incondicional) | 20 Años, Busca Una Mujer, |
| 15. | "Intro (Saxophone) / Medley" (Yo Que No Vivo Sin Ti / Culpable o No) | Soy Como Quiero Ser, Busca Una Mujer, |
| 16. | "Hasta Que Me Olvides" | Aries |
| 17. | "Te Necesito" | 33 |
| 18. | "Y Sigo (Sometimes)" | 33 |
| 19. | "Medley" (Mucho Corazón / La Media Vuelta / Amorcito Corazón (Sometimes)) | Romance, Segundo Romance, Mis Romances |
| 20. | "Intro (Mariachi) / El Son De La Negra" |
| 21. | "Intro (Mariachi) / El Viajero" | México En La Piel |
| 22. | "La Bikina" | Vivo |
| 23. | "Medley (Sometimes)" (Si Nos Dejan / Échame A Mí La Culpa / Sabes Una Cosa) | El Concierto, México En La Piel |
| 24. | "México En La Piel (Sometimes)" | México En La Piel |
| 25. | "Medley" (Cielito Lindo / Que Bonita Es Mi Tierra / Viva México, Viva América) |
| 26. | "Medley" (Separados / 1+1 = Dos Enamorados / Directo Al Corazon) | Busca Una Mujer, Un sol, Directo al corazón |
| 27. | "Medley (Only Puebla)" (Vuelve / Eres / Como Es Posible Que A Mi Lado / Será Que No Me Amas / Te Propongo Esta Noche)/ Te Propongo Esta Noche (Reprise) | 33, Nada Es Igual, 20 Años, Amarte Es Un Placer |
| 28. | "Dejá Vú" |
| 29. | "Labios de Miel / Reprise" | Luis Miguel |

Dejá Vu Tour: (6 shows) Apr/09/2015 - Apr/11/2015

Dejá Vu Tour : (6 shows) Apr/09/2015 – Apr/11/2015, Apr/17/2015 – Apr/18/2015
| No. | Title | Original album | Length |
|---|---|---|---|
| 1. | "Intro (Trumpet) / Quién Será" |
| 2. | "Tú Solo Tú" | Amarte Es Un Placer |
| 3. | "Medley" (Dame Tu Amor / Sol, Arena Y Mar / Suave) | Aries, Amarte Es Un Placer |
| 4. | "Amor, Amor, Amor" | Mis Romances |
| 5. | "O Tú o Ninguna (Only Aguascalientes)" | Amarte Es Un Placer |
| 6. | "Medley (Only Aguascalientes)" (Todo Y Nada / Sabor A Mí / Sin Tí) | Segundo Romance, Romances |
| 7. | "Medley" (Mucho Corazón / La Media Vuelta / Amorcito Corazón) | Romance, Segundo Romance, Mis Romances |
| 8. | "Intro (Mariachi) / El Son De La Negra" |
| 9. | "Intro (Mariachi) / El Viajero" | México En La Piel |
| 10. | "La Bikina" | Vivo |
| 11. | "De Que Manera te Olvido" | México En La Piel |
| 12. | "Fallaste Corazón" |
| 13. | "México En La Piel" | México En La Piel |
| 14. | "Mi Ciudad" | México En La Piel |
| 15. | "Cielito Lindo Medley" (Cielito Lindo / Que Bonita Es Mi Tierra / Viva México, Viva América) |
| 16. | "El Rey" | El Concierto |
| 17. | "Medley" (Separados / 1+1 = Dos Enamorados / Directo Al Corazon) | Busca Una Mujer, Un sol, Directo al corazón |
| 18. | "Medley" (Vuelve / Eres / Como Es Posible Que A Mi Lado / Será Que No Me Amas / Te Propongo Esta Noche) | 33, Nada Es Igual, 20 Años, Amarte Es Un Placer |
| 19. | "Dejá Vu" |
| 20. | "Labios de Miel" | Luis Miguel |

Dejá Vu Tour: (8 shows) Sep/11/2015 - Sep/20/2015

Dejá Vu Tour : (8 shows) Sep/11/2015 – Sep/20/2015
| No. | Title | Original album | Length |
|---|---|---|---|
| 1. | "IntroMix / Que Nivel de Mujer" | Aries |
| 2. | "Tú Solo Tú" | Amarte Es Un Placer |
| 3. | "Medley" (Dame Tu Amor / Sol, Arena Y Mar / Suave) | Aries, Amarte Es Un Placer |
| 4. | "Medley" (Todo Y Nada / Sabor A Mí / Sin Tí) | Segundo Romance, Romances |
| 5. | "Medley" (La Última Noche / Amor Amor Amor) | Mis Romances |
| 6. | "Medley" (Hoy El Aire Huele a Ti / Siento / Más / Sintiéndote Lejos) | 20 Años, Luis Miguel, Nada Es Igual |
| 7. | "Esa Niña" | Busca Una Mujer |
| 8. | "Medley" (Amante del Amor / Más Allá de Todo / Fría Como el Viento / Tengo Todo Excepto a Ti / La Incondicional) | 20 Años, Busca Una Mujer |
| 9. | "Nosotros" | Segundo Romance |
| 10. | "Intro (Saxophone) / Medley" (Yo Que No Vivo Sin Ti / Culpable o No) | Soy Como Quiero Ser, Busca Una Mujer, |
| 11. | "Hasta Que Me Olvides" | Aries |
| 12. | "Te Necesito" | 33 |
| 13. | "Medley" (Mucho Corazón / La Media Vuelta / Amorcito Corazón) | Romance, Segundo Romance, Mis Romances |
| 14. | "Cucurrucucu Paloma" |
| 15. | "Intro (Mariachi) / El Son De La Negra" |
| 16. | "Intro (Mariachi) / El Viajero" | México En La Piel |
| 17. | "La Bikina" | Vivo |
| 18. | "Medley" (Si Nos Dejan / Échame A Mí La Culpa / Sabes Una Cosa) | El Concierto, México En La Piel |
| 19. | "Medley" (Cielito Lindo / Que Bonita Es Mi Tierra / Viva México, Viva América) |
| 20. | "Medley (Sometimes)" (Separados / 1+1 = Dos Enamorados / Directo Al Corazon) | Busca Una Mujer, Un sol, Directo al corazón |
| 21. | "Medley (Sometimes)" (Vuelve / Eres / Como Es Posible Que A Mi Lado / Será Que No Me Amas / Te Propongo Esta Noche)/ Te Propongo Esta Noche (Reprise)) | 33, Nada Es Igual, 20 Años, Amarte Es Un Placer |
| 22. | "Dejá Vu (Sometimes)" |
| 23. | "Labios de Miel (Sometimes)" | Luis Miguel |

Dejá Vu Tour: (8 shows) Nov/11/2015 - Nov/21/2015

Dejá Vu Tour : (8 shows) Nov/11/2015 – Nov/21/2015
| No. | Title | Original album | Length |
|---|---|---|---|
| 1. | "Intro (Mix) / Que Nivel de Mujer" | Aries |
| 2. | "Tú Solo Tú" | Amarte Es Un Placer |
| 3. | "Medley" (Dame Tu Amor / Sol, Arena Y Mar / Suave) | Aries, Amarte Es Un Placer |
| 4. | "Medley" (Todo Y Nada / Sabor A Mí / Sin Tí) | Segundo Romance, Romances |
| 5. | "Medley" (La Última Noche / Amor Amor Amor) | Mis Romances |
| 6. | "Nosotros" | Segundo Romance |
| 7. | "Esa Niña" | Busca Una Mujer |
| 8. | "Medley" (Amante del Amor / Más Allá de Todo / Fría Como el Viento / Tengo Todo Excepto a Ti / La Incondicional) | 20 Años, Busca Una Mujer |
| 9. | "Intro (Saxophone) / Medley" (Yo Que No Vivo Sin Ti / Culpable o No) | Soy Como Quiero Ser, Busca Una Mujer, |
| 10. | "Hasta Que Me Olvides" | Aries |
| 11. | "Te Necesito" | 33 |
| 12. | "Y Sigo" | 33 |
| 13. | "Medley" (Mucho Corazón / La Media Vuelta / Amorcito Corazón) | Romance, Segundo Romance, Mis Romances |
| 14. | "Cucurrucucu Paloma" |
| 15. | "Intro (Mariachi) / El Son De La Negra" |
| 16. | "Intro (Mariachi) / El Viajero" | México En La Piel |
| 17. | "La Bikina" | Vivo |
| 18. | "Medley" (Cielito Lindo / Que Bonita Es Mi Tierra / Viva México, Viva América) |
| 19. | "Medley" (Separados / 1+1 = Dos Enamorados / Directo Al Corazon) | Busca Una Mujer, Un sol, Directo al corazón |
| 20. | "Medley" (Vuelve / Eres / Como Es Posible Que A Mi Lado / Será Que No Me Amas / Te Propongo Esta Noche)/ Te Propongo Esta Noche (Reprise)) | 33, Nada Es Igual, 20 Años, Amarte Es Un Placer |
| 22. | "Dejá Vu (Only Puebla)" |
| 23. | "Labios de Miel" | Luis Miguel |

Dejá Vu Tour: (9 shows) Nov/25/2015 - Dic/6/2015

Dejá Vu Tour : (9 shows) Nov/25/2015 – Dic/6/2015
| No. | Title | Original album | Length |
|---|---|---|---|
| 1. | "Intro (Mix) / Que Nivel de Mujer" | Aries |
| 2. | "Tú Solo Tú" | Amarte Es Un Placer |
| 3. | "Medley" (Dame Tu Amor / Sol, Arena Y Mar / Suave) | Aries, Amarte Es Un Placer |
| 4. | "Medley" (La Última Noche / Amor Amor Amor) | Mis Romances |
| 5. | "Que Tu Te Vas (Only Chile)" | Nada Es Igual |
| 6. | "Medley (Sometimes)" (Todo Y Nada / Sabor A Mí / Sin Tí) | Segundo Romance, Romances |
| 7. | "Somos Novios (Only Chile)" | Segundo Romance |
| 8. | "Nosotros (Sometimes)" | Segundo Romance |
| 9. | "Medley (Sometimes)" (Hoy El Aire Huele a Ti / Siento / Más / Sintiéndote Lejos) | 20 Años, Luis Miguel, Nada Es Igual |
| 10. | "Esa Niña" | Busca Una Mujer |
| 11. | "Medley" (Amante del Amor / Más Allá de Todo / Fría Como el Viento / Tengo Todo Excepto a Ti / La Incondicional) | 20 Años, Busca Una Mujer |
| 12. | "Intro (Saxophone) / Medley" (Yo Que No Vivo Sin Ti / Culpable o No) | Soy Como Quiero Ser, Busca Una Mujer, |
| 13. | "Hasta Que Me Olvides" | Aries |
| 14. | "Te Necesito" | 33 |
| 15. | "Cucurrucucu Paloma" |
| 16. | "Intro (Mariachi) / El Son De La Negra (Only Colombia)" |
| 17. | "Intro (Mariachi) / El Viajero (Only Colombia)" | México En La Piel |
| 18. | "La Bikina (Only Colombia)" | Vivo |
| 19. | "Medley (Only Colombia)" (Cielito Lindo / Que Bonita Es Mi Tierra / Viva México, Viva América) |
| 20. | "Medley" (Separados / 1+1 = Dos Enamorados / Directo Al Corazon) | Busca Una Mujer, Un sol, Directo al corazón |
| 21. | "Medley" (Vuelve / Eres / Como Es Posible Que A Mi Lado / Será Que No Me Amas / Te Propongo Esta Noche / Te Propongo Esta Noche (Reprise)) | 33, Nada Es Igual, 20 Años, Amarte Es Un Placer |
| 22. | "Labios de Miel" | Luis Miguel |

Dejá Vu Tour: (2 shows) Dic/10/2015 - Dic/12/2015

Dejá Vu Tour : (8 shows) Dic/10/2015 – Dic/12/2015
| No. | Title | Original album | Length |
|---|---|---|---|
| 1. | "Intro (Mix) / Que Nivel de Mujer" | Aries |
| 2. | "Tú Solo Tú" | Amarte Es Un Placer |
| 3. | "Medley" (Dame Tu Amor / Sol, Arena Y Mar / Suave) | Aries, Amarte Es Un Placer |
| 4. | "Medley" (La Última Noche / Amor Amor Amor) | Mis Romances |
| 5. | "Medley" (Todo Y Nada / Sabor A Mí / Sin Tí) | Segundo Romance, Romances |
| 6. | "Esa Niña" | Busca Una Mujer |
| 7. | "Medley" (Amante del Amor / Más Allá de Todo / Fría Como el Viento / Tengo Todo Excepto a Ti / La Incondicional) | 20 Años, Busca Una Mujer |
| 8. | "Intro (Saxophone) / Medley" (Yo Que No Vivo Sin Ti / Culpable o No) | Soy Como Quiero Ser, Busca Una Mujer, |
| 9. | "Hasta Que Me Olvides" | Aries |
| 10. | "Te Necesito" | 33 |
| 11. | "Cucurrucucu Paloma" |
| 12. | "Intro (Mariachi) / El Son De La Negra" |
| 13. | "Intro (Mariachi) / El Viajero" | México En La Piel |
| 14. | "La Bikina" | Vivo |
| 15. | "Medley" (Cielito Lindo / Que Bonita Es Mi Tierra / Viva México, Viva América) |
| 16. | "Medley" (Separados / 1+1 = Dos Enamorados / Directo Al Corazon) | Busca Una Mujer, Un sol, Directo al corazón |
| 17. | "Medley" (Vuelve / Eres / Como Es Posible Que A Mi Lado / Será Que No Me Amas / Te Propongo Esta Noche / Te Propongo Esta Noche (Reprise)) | 33, Nada Es Igual, 20 Años, Amarte Es Un Placer |
| 18. | "Labios de Miel" | Luis Miguel |

== Tour dates ==
List of concerts, showing date, city, country, venue, tickets sold, number of available tickets and amount of gross revenue
| Date | City | Country | Venue | Attendance | Revenue |
North America - Leg 1
| September 12, 2014 | Las Vegas | United States | The Colosseum at Caesars Palace | 13,581 / 16,037 | $2,412,855 |
| September 13, 2014 | Las Vegas | United States | The Colosseum at Caesars Palace | 13,581 / 16,037 | $2,412,855 |
| September 14, 2014 | Las Vegas | United States | The Colosseum at Caesars Palace | 13,581 / 16,037 | $2,412,855 |
| September 15, 2014 | Las Vegas | United States | The Colosseum at Caesars Palace | 13,581 / 16,037 | $2,412,855 |
| September 17, 2014 | Phoenix | United States | Comerica Theatre | 3,110 / 3,900 | $421,413 |
| September 18, 2014 | San Diego | United States | Viejas Arena | 6,168 / 9,500 | $227,345 |
| September 19, 2014 | Inglewood | United States | The Forum | 14,577 / 17,715 | $1,213,780 |
| September 20, 2014 | Inglewood | United States | The Forum | 14,577 / 17,715 | $1,213,780 |
| September 21, 2014 | Oakland | United States | Oracle Arena | 4,801 / 9,660 | $409,001 |
| October 9, 2014 | Guadalajara | Mexico | Palenque | —N/a | —N/a |
| October 10, 2014 | Guadalajara | Mexico | Palenque | —N/a | —N/a |
| October 11, 2014 | Guadalajara | Mexico | Palenque | —N/a | —N/a |
| October 12, 2014 | Guadalajara | Mexico | Palenque | —N/a | —N/a |
South America - Leg 2
| October 15, 2014 | Santiago | Chile | Movistar Arena | —N/a | —N/a |
| October 16, 2014 | Santiago | Chile | Movistar Arena | —N/a | —N/a |
| October 17, 2014 | Santiago | Chile | Movistar Arena | —N/a | —N/a |
| October 18, 2014 | Viña del Mar | Chile | Quinta Vergara Amphitheater | —N/a | —N/a |
| October 21, 2014 | Buenos Aires | Argentina | La Rural | 1,155 / 1,656 | $708,214 |
| October 23, 2014 | Buenos Aires | Argentina | Estadio G.E.B.A. | 30,952 / 56,448 | $3,328,863 |
| October 24, 2014 | Buenos Aires | Argentina | Estadio G.E.B.A. | 30,952 / 56,448 | $3,328,863 |
| October 25, 2014 | Buenos Aires | Argentina | Estadio G.E.B.A. | 30,952 / 56,448 | $3,328,863 |
| October 26, 2014 | Buenos Aires | Argentina | Estadio G.E.B.A. | 30,952 / 56,448 | $3,328,863 |
| October 30, 2014 | Córdoba | Argentina | Orfeo Superdomo | —N/a | —N/a |
| October 31, 2014 | Córdoba | Argentina | Orfeo Superdomo | —N/a | —N/a |
| November 1, 2014 | Mendoza | Argentina | Arena Maipú | —N/a | —N/a |
| November 2, 2014 | Rosario | Argentina | Metropolitano | —N/a | —N/a |
| November 4, 2014 | Tucumán | Argentina | Estadio Club Atlético Central Córdoba de Tucumán | —N/a | —N/a |
| November 6, 2014 | Posadas | Argentina | Club Atlético Posadas | —N/a | —N/a |
| November 8, 2014 | Asunción | Paraguay | Jockey Club | —N/a | —N/a |
North America
| December 31, 2014 | Monterrey | Mexico | Fundidora Park | —N/a | —N/a |
North America - Leg 3
| January 27, 2015 | Puebla | Mexico | Auditorio Siglo XXI | 5,327 / 5,327 | $578,783 |
| January 29, 2015 | Mexico City | Mexico | National Auditorium | 36,637 / 38,336 | $2,442,746 |
| January 30, 2015 | Mexico City | Mexico | National Auditorium | 36,637 / 38,336 | $2,442,746 |
| January 31, 2015 | Mexico City | Mexico | National Auditorium | 36,637 / 38,336 | $2,442,746 |
| February 1, 2015 | Mexico City | Mexico | National Auditorium | 36,637 / 38,336 | $2,442,746 |
| February 4, 2015 | Xalapa | Mexico | Estadio Colon | 8,240 / 8,240 | $709,987 |
| February 6, 2015 | Ciudad del Carmen | Mexico | Estadio Resurgimiento | 5,520 / 5,520 | $588,292 |
| February 10, 2015 | Querétaro | Mexico | Auditorio Josefa Ortiz de Domínguez | 4,099 / 4,700 | $391,790 |
| February 12, 2015 | Mexico City | Mexico | National Auditorium | 35,900 / 38,336 | $2,617,844 |
| February 13, 2015 | Mexico City | Mexico | National Auditorium | 35,900 / 38,336 | $2,617,844 |
| February 14, 2015 | Mexico City | Mexico | National Auditorium | 35,900 / 38,336 | $2,617,844 |
| February 15, 2015 | Mexico City | Mexico | National Auditorium | 35,900 / 38,336 | $2,617,844 |
| February 26, 2015 | Mexico City | Mexico | National Auditorium | 30,347 / 38,080 | $1,831,880 |
| February 27, 2015 | Mexico City | Mexico | National Auditorium | 30,347 / 38,080 | $1,831,880 |
| February 28, 2015 | Mexico City | Mexico | National Auditorium | 30,347 / 38,080 | $1,831,880 |
| March 1, 2015 | Mexico City | Mexico | National Auditorium | 30,347 / 38,080 | $1,831,880 |
| March 5, 2015 | Guadalajara | Mexico | Telmex Auditorium | 5,058 / 8,159 | $474,841 |
| March 6, 2015 | Morelia | Mexico | Estadio Venustiano Carranza | 11,786 / 12,000 | $1,022,809 |
| March 7, 2015 | León | Mexico | Poliforum León | 5,838 / 7,000 | $454,269 |
| March 10, 2015 | San Luis Potosí | Mexico | El Domo | 4,242 / 5,500 | $322,919 |
| March 12, 2015 | Monterrey | Mexico | Auditorio Banamex | 15,647 / 19,803 | $1,342,730 |
| March 13, 2015 | Monterrey | Mexico | Auditorio Banamex | 15,647 / 19,803 | $1,342,730 |
| March 14, 2015 | Monterrey | Mexico | Auditorio Banamex | 15,647 / 19,803 | $1,342,730 |
| March 17, 2015 | Torreón | Mexico | Coliseo Centenario | 3,805 / 4,500 | $358,350 |
| March 20, 2015 | Chihuahua | Mexico | ExpoChihuahua | 3,587 / 5,000 | $257,174 |
| March 21, 2015 | Ciudad Juárez | Mexico | Estadio Juárez Vive | 4,940 / 10,000 | $210,525 |
| March 25, 2015 | Hermosillo | Mexico | Centro de Usos Múltiples (CUM) | 3,308 / 5,000 | $281,929 |
| March 27, 2015 | Mexicali | Mexico | Plaza de Toros Calafia | 4,536 / 5,000 | $244,899 |
| March 28, 2015 | Tijuana | Mexico | Plaza de toros Monumental | 6,135 / 8,000 | $389,117 |
| April 9, 2015 | Texcoco | Mexico | Palenque | —N/a | —N/a |
| April 10, 2015 | Texcoco | Mexico | Palenque | —N/a | —N/a |
| April 11, 2015 | Texcoco | Mexico | Palenque | —N/a | —N/a |
| April 12, 2015 | Veracruz | Mexico | Macroplaza del Malecón | —N/a | —N/a |
| April 17, 2015 | Aguascalientes | Mexico | Palenque | —N/a | —N/a |
| April 18, 2015 | Aguascalientes | Mexico | Palenque | —N/a | —N/a |
North America - Leg 4
| September 11, 2015 | Salt Lake City | United States | USANA Amphitheatre | —N/a | —N/a |
| September 12, 2015 | Las Vegas | United States | Mandalay Bay Events Center | —N/a | —N/a |
| September 13, 2015 | Anaheim | United States | Honda Center | 4,751 / 8,352 | $495,428 |
| September 15, 2015 | El Paso | United States | Don Haskins Center | —N/a | —N/a |
| September 16, 2015 | Phoenix | United States | Comerica Theatre | —N/a | —N/a |
| September 18, 2015 | Indio | United States | Fantasy Springs Resort Casino | —N/a | —N/a |
| September 19, 2015 | Reno | United States | Grand Sierra Resort | —N/a | —N/a |
| September 20, 2015 | San Jose | United States | SAP Center | 2,702 / 9,852 | $247,870 |
| November 11, 2015 | Puebla | Mexico | Auditorio Metropolitano | —N/a | —N/a |
| November 12, 2015 | Monterrey | Mexico | Auditorio Banamex | 6,384 / 6,815 | $522,560 |
| November 14, 2015 | Villa de Álvarez | Mexico | Palenque | —N/a | —N/a |
| November 15, 2015 | Puerto Vallarta | Mexico | Centro Internacional de Convenciones | —N/a | —N/a |
South America
| November 25, 2015 | Córdoba | Argentina | Orfeo Superdomo | —N/a | —N/a |
| November 27, 2015 | Buenos Aires | Argentina | Estadio G.E.B.A. | —N/a | —N/a |
| November 28, 2015 | Buenos Aires | Argentina | Estadio G.E.B.A. | —N/a | —N/a |
| November 30, 2015 | Santiago | Chile | Movistar Arena | 9,070 / 12,510 | $868,450 |
| December 1, 2015 | Santiago | Chile | Movistar Arena | 7,664 / 12,510 | $649,335 |
| December 2, 2015 | Viña del Mar | Chile | Quinta Vergara Amphitheater | —N/a | —N/a |
| December 4, 2015 | Cali | Colombia | Plaza de Toros Cañaveralejo | —N/a | —N/a |
| December 5, 2015 | Bogotá | Colombia | Centro de Eventos Autopista Norte | —N/a | —N/a |
| December 6, 2015 | Cartagena | Colombia | Centro de Convenciones Las Américas "Plaza de la Independencia" | —N/a | —N/a |
North America
| December 10, 2015 | Miami | United States | American Airlines Arena | 13,421 / 14,000 | $1,447,395 |
| December 12, 2015 | Miami | United States | American Airlines Arena | 13,421 / 14,000 | $1,447,395 |
| Total | | | | 313,298 / 407,456 (76,9%) | $27,473,393 |

== Cancelled shows ==
List of cancelled concerts, showing date, city, country, venue, and reason for cancellation
| Date | City | Country | Venue | Reason |
|---|---|---|---|---|
| February 7, 2015 | Mérida | México | Coliseo Yucatán | Aircraft technical problems |
| December 13, 2015 | Duluth | United States | Infinite Energy Center | Health problems |
| December 14, 2015 | Charlotte | United States | Time Warner Cable Arena | Health problems |
| December 16, 2015 | Fairfax | United States | Patriot Center | Health problems |
| December 17, 2015 | Boston | United States | Wang Theater | Health problems |
| December 18, 2015 | New York City | United States | Madison Square Garden | Health problems |
| December 20, 2015 | Rosemont | United States | Rosemont Theatre | Health problems |
| March 30, 2016 (Note: The March 30, April 1, 2 and 3, 2016 shows at National Auditorium in Mexico City was originally scheduled to take place on November 18, 19, 20 and 21, 2015, but was postponed due to "Health Problems" and then canceled.) | Mexico City | México | National Auditorium | Medical treatment |
| April 1, 2016 | Mexico City | México | National Auditorium | Medical treatment |
| April 2, 2016 | Mexico City | México | National Auditorium | Medical treatment |
| April 3, 2016 | Mexico City | México | National Auditorium | Medical treatment |

== Awards and records ==
- On October 25, 2014, he was named "distinguished guest" by the city of Buenos Aires; Certificate and gold medal for record of performances in Buenos Aires (1982–2014).
- On September 11, 2015, is awarded by The Utah Office Of The Attorney General with a recognition plaque for his years of music.

== Band ==
- Acoustic & electric guitar: Todd Robinson
- Bass: Lalo Carrillo
- Piano: Francisco Loyo
- Keyboards & programming: Salo Loyo
- Drums: Victor Loyo
- Percussion: Tommy Aros (2014)
- Percussion: Armando Espinosa "Pinaca"
- Saxophone: Jeff Nathanson
- Trumpet: Ramón Flores
- Trumpet: Peter Olstad (2014)
- Trumpet: Brad Steinwehe
- Trombone: Alejandro Carballo
- Backing vocals: Kasia Sowinska (2014)
- Backing vocals: Paula Peralta (2014–2015)
