= List of number-one hits of 1984 (Argentina) =

This is a list of the songs that reached number one in Argentina in 1984, according to Cashbox magazine with data provided by the Argentine Chamber of Phonograms and Videograms Producers.

Issue date	Song	Artist(s)
January 14	"A Esa"	Pimpinela
January 21	"A Esa"	Pimpinela
January 28	"A Esa"	Pimpinela
February 11	"Paraíso"	Pomada
March 17	"Decídete"	Luis Miguel
March 24	"Dolce Vita"	Ryan Paris
March 31	"Ya nunca más"	Luis Miguel
April 7	"Dolce Vita"	Ryan Paris
April 21	"Dolce Vita"	Ryan Paris
April 28	"Dolce Vita"	Ryan Paris
May 19	"No me puedo quejar"	Ángela Carrasco
May 26	"Ya nunca más"	Luis Miguel
June 2	"Ya nunca más"	Luis Miguel
June 16	"Walking In The Sunshine"	Laid Back
June 30	"Walking In The Sunshine"	Laid Back
July 7	"Walking In The Sunshine"	Laid Back
July 14	"Walking In The Sunshine"	Laid Back
July 21	"Walking In The Sunshine"	Laid Back
August 11	"Corazón mágico"	Dyango
September 1	"Walking In The Sunshine"	Laid Back
September 8	"Walking In The Sunshine"	Laid Back
September 15	"Ya nunca más"	Luis Miguel
September 29	"Walking In The Sunshine"	Laid Back
October 6	"De Profesion...... Tu Amante"	Julio Sandiego
October 13	"Thriller"	Michael Jackson
October 27	"La otra"	Aldo Monges
November 3	"Ya nunca más"	Luis Miguel
November 24	"Tentación"	José Luis Perales
December 8	"Tentación"	José Luis Perales
December 15	"Ahora decide"	Pimpinela
December 22	"Original Sin"	INXS

== See also ==
- 1984 in music
