= List of number-one hits of 1968 (Argentina) =

This is a list of the songs that reached number one in Argentina in 1968, according to Billboard magazine with data provided by Rubén Machado's "Escalera a la fama".

Issue date	Song	Artist(s)
January 6	"Quiero llenarme de ti"	Sandro
January 20	"Quiero llenarme de ti"	Sandro
January 27	"Esta tarde vi llover"	Armando Manzanero/Roberto Yáñez/Hermanos Arriagada/ Olga Guillot/King Clave/Polo Márquez
February 3	"Esta tarde vi llover"	Armando Manzanero/Roberto Yáñez/Hermanos Arriagada/ Olga Guillot/King Clave/Polo Márquez
February 10	"Esta tarde vi llover"	Armando Manzanero/Roberto Yáñez/Hermanos Arriagada/ Olga Guillot/King Clave/Polo Márquez
February 17	"Pata Pata"	Miriam Makeba/Los Cuatro Brillantes/Jacko Zeller
March 23	"Pata Pata"	Miriam Makeba/Los Cuatro Brillantes/Jacko Zeller
March 30	"Pata Pata"	Miriam Makeba/Los Cuatro Brillantes/Jacko Zeller
May 4	"Mi gran noche"/"Digan lo que digan"	Raphael
May 11	"Mi gran noche"/"Digan lo que digan"	Raphael
May 18	"Mi gran noche"/"Digan lo que digan"	Raphael
May 25	"Mi gran noche"/"Digan lo que digan"	Raphael
June 1	"Mi gran noche"/"Digan lo que digan"	Raphael
June 15	"Mi gran noche"/"Digan lo que digan"	Raphael
June 22	"Viento, dile a la lluvia"	Los Gatos
June 29	"Viento, dile a la lluvia"	Los Gatos
July 6	"Viento, dile a la lluvia"	Los Gatos
July 13	"Viento, dile a la lluvia"	Los Gatos
July 20	"Viento, dile a la lluvia"	Los Gatos
July 27	"Corazón contento"/"Estoy celoso"	Palito Ortega
August 10	"Delilah"	Jimmy Fontana/Tom Jones/Paul Mauriat/Miguel Ramos
August 17	"’O sole mio"/"Giovane Giovane"	Topo Gigio
August 24	"’O sole mio"/"Giovane Giovane"	Topo Gigio
August 31	"’O sole mio"/"Giovane Giovane"	Topo Gigio
September 14	"Porque yo te amo"	Sandro
September 21	"Porque yo te amo"	Sandro
September 28	"Porque yo te amo"	Sandro
October 5	"Porque yo te amo"	Sandro
October 12	"Porque yo te amo"	Sandro
October 19	"La primavera"	Palito Ortega
October 26	"La primavera"	Palito Ortega
November 2	"La primavera"	Palito Ortega
November 9	"Fuiste mía un verano"	Leonardo Favio
November 16	"Fuiste mía un verano"	Leonardo Favio
November 23	"Fuiste mía un verano"	Leonardo Favio
November 30	"Fuiste mía un verano"	Leonardo Favio
December 7	"Fuiste mía un verano"	Leonardo Favio
December 14	"Fuiste mía un verano"	Leonardo Favio
December 21	"Fuiste mía un verano"	Leonardo Favio
December 28	"Fuiste mía un verano"	Leonardo Favio

== See also ==
- 1968 in music
