= Luis Miguel discography =

Luis Miguel discography may refer to:

- Luis Miguel albums discography
- Luis Miguel singles discography
