= Ya nunca más (film) =

1983 Mexican musical film directed by Abel Salazar

Ya nunca más is a 1983 Mexican musical film directed by Abel Salazar. It starred the young Luis Miguel in his first film role as a soccer-loving youngster who after breaking his leg, is diagnosed with leukemia and has to cope with the amputation of that leg. The soundtrack album Ya nunca más became Miguel's first gold record.

== Cast ==
- Luis Miguel – Luis Aranda
- Gonzalo Vega – Enrique Aranda
- Rosa Salazar Arenas – Lorena
- Ariadna Welter – Sra. Cecilia
- Sergio Kleiner – Doctor
