= Amándote a la Italiana =

1985 compilation album by Luis Miguel

Amándote A La Italiana

Compilation album by Luis Miguel
- Released: 1985
- Genre: Latin pop

Luis Miguel chronology
Fiebre de Amor (album) (1985)	Amándote A La Italiana (1985)	Tambien es Rock (1986)

The release of Amándote A La Italiana was meant to compile Luis Miguel's recordings in the Italian language. This album was originally released in 1985 under the name of Luis Miguel: Canta In Italiano, and in 1992, was re-released also as Collezione Privata (Private Collection). In countries like Argentina, Chile and Italy this album is also known as Noi, Ragazzi di Oggi (We, the boys of today). The Italian edition of the album contained also one more song "Il cielo".

== Track listing ==
1. "Parola D'Onore"
2. "Il Bikini Blu"
3. "Chiamami"
4. "Tu Di Cuore Nonne Hai"
5. "Il Re Di Cuori"
6. "Isabel"
7. "Noi, Ragazzi Di Oggi"
8. "Lili"
9. "Io Muoio Per Te"
10. "Un Rock And Roll Suono"

== Charts ==
=== Weekly charts ===
Chart (1985)	Peak position
Italian Albums (Fimi)	7

=== Year-end charts ===
Chart (1985)	Peak position
Italian Albums (Fimi)	63
