= King Clave =

Argentine singer and songwriter

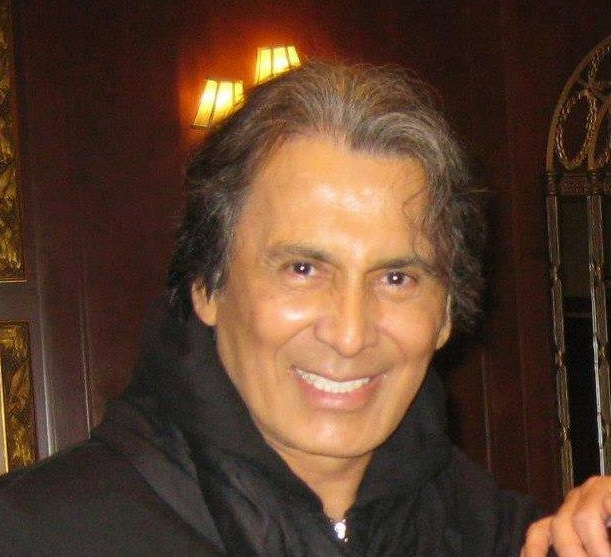

Jorge Ayala (born February 14, 1944, in Formosa, Argentina), better known as King Clave, is an Argentine singer and songwriter with hits from the 1970s and 1980s.

== Career ==
King Clave's career began on Argentina's Canal 13. He was later featured in the show "Sábados Circulares de Mancera." From there, he went on to act in "Special", "Tropicana Club", "Sábados de la bondad," and other shows.

In 1973 he acted in the show "Sábado Sensacional de Amador Bendayan" (Amador Bendayan's Sensational Saturday), later simply known as Super Sábado Sensacional transmitted through Venezuela's main TV broadcaster Venevisión and in 1974 he decided to be his own record producer and recorded his first international album with the hit "Los hombres no deben llorar" (Men shouldn't cry), followed by "Mi corazón lloro" (My heart cried), "Usted me dejo llorando" (You left me crying), "Tema de amor para una chiquilina" (A little girl's love's theme), "Nunca mas podré olvidarte" (I'll never forget you), "Por culpa de tu amor" (Because of your love), among others.

In 1976 he debuted in Raúl Velasco's "Siempre en Domingo" (Always on Sunday). Since then, he has given shows across the world.

King Clave befriended the singer Roberto Sanchez (who later became the famous Sandro), and one day he went to the legendary show lounge La Cueva and introduced him to Billy Bond, one of the musicians they created the movement called "Rock Nacional Argentino".

In return for washing the dishes in his night club, Billy Bond let him sing his native guaranias and some boleros. One day Billy and King Clave composed the first ballad together "La canción de tus lágrimas" and Billy took him, with that song, to debut in the biggest musical TV show of that era "ESCALA MUSICAL" on Channel 13.

Then he began his career, constantly appearing in the best television programs as "Sábados circulares de Mancera" (Canal 13); " Sábado de la bondad "; "El Special"; "Tropicana Club " y "Grandes valores" (Canal 9).

In 1968 he won the "Newcomer" award at the third festival Buenos Aires songs and began a beautiful face in his career, participated in the film La Pandilla Inolvidable released on October 27, 1971, in the movie theater Italia de Formosa. Some of the actors in that movie: Ana Maria Picchio, Celia Cadaval, Ubaldo Martínez, Santiago Gómez Cou, Luis Medina Castro, Louie Cohen, Pablo Codevilla Cachito Gomez, Carlos Medina "TABOO" Saturnino Lopez with the Polyphonic Choir of Formosa led by Elda Milanese, June 4 his best-known songs so far were used: "Yo te amo mi amor... yo te amo" and "El niño de la calle sonriente" in 1970, following a personal problem he returned to his home province . In winter of 1972 he returned to Buenos Aires.

In 1972 he began his studies at the School of Fine Arts in Buenos Aires, where he specialized in various artistic disciplines. Also at that time he studied a degree in copyright SADAIC (Argentina Society of Authors and Composers). His teachers Homero Expósito y Eladia Blázquez were counted. In 1973 he graduated as "Bachelor of copyright". That year would win the first prize at the Festival of Piriápolis (Republic of Uruguay).

In 1973 he starred in the "Sábados Sensacionales" of Amador Bendayán's program in Venevisión of Venezuela. He was hired by Karen Record of Bienvenido Rodriguez (Dominican Republic) to artistically produce Fausto Rey, Sonia Silvestre, and Camboy Estevez, among others, with whom he achieved significant international recognition as a producer and composer. That same year he produced for the PROMUS seal (of Venezuela) an LP with the star and actress Susana Gimenez from Argentina.

In 1974 he decided to become the first independent producer in Argentina. He placed several artists at the top of sales at record companies Odeon, RCA Victor and Music Hall, among others. That year he traveled to Mexico, where he presented his own material and jumped into the international market. He immediately placed first in the rankings of Latin America and receives a Gold Record from Orfeon for 300,000 copies of the single sold "LOS HOMBRES NO DEBEN LLORAR". It is estimated sold 5 million singles the total "LOS HOMBRES NO DEBEN LLORAR", "ABEJA REINA", "MI CORAZÓN LLORÓ", "NUNCA MÁS PODRÉ OLVIDARTE", "POR CULPA DE TU AMOR" and "TEMA DE AMOR PARA UNA CHIQUILINA" among others.

"ABEJA REINA" and other hits from King Clave were recorded and re-recorded by various artists from Latin America and Europe. In January 2012, King Clave re-recorded a version as Formosa Folk Music.

2 and 3 June 1975 was presented for the first time at Madison Square Garden (New York) and brought together in three concerts, 50,000 people, follow by the Olympia (Paris), Caesars Palace (Las Vegas) and many other world casinos, that same year was presented at the Televisa channel (of Mexico) to the most important program in that country: "Siempre en Domingo", led by Raul Velasco. Primetime debut with him Brazil Singer Morris Albert and Spanish Singer-Songwriter Camilo Sesto.

In 1976, he appeared in Madison Square Garden, and began a tour across the United States, leading a caravan with Vicente Fernandez, with the participation of Juan Gabriel, Lola Beltran, Trio Los Panchos, Yolanda del Río and Jorge Vargas, among other Mexican artists.

After the tour, he starred in the Mexican film "La hija de nadie" (released in early 1979). Immediately after appeared in " Los Hombres no deben llorar" movie (released on June 21, 1979) starring with Naomi Ceratto (actress whom he married in 1976) and Yolanda del Río.

In 1980 he participated in the Argentinean film Rhythm "Ritmo, amor y primavera" of Enrique Carreras, with Cacho Chestnut, Monica Gonzaga, Tincho Zabala, Carlos Calvo, Juan Carlos Thorry Alan and Naomi. It premiered in January 1981. That year appeared several songs in Argentine telenovelas: "Herencia de amor", "Un callejón en las nubes", "Rossé", "Aprender a vivir", "Lo imperdonable" and thus manages to enter the market in his country, Argentina.

In 1982, Mexican singer Luis Miguel included a song of King Clave, "Balada Para mi Abuela", on his album Un Sol.

In 1984 he co-starred in the Argentine-Mexican film "La Superdotada", directed by Juan Bautista Maggipinto with Tixou Thelma, Orlando Marconi and his own wife Naomi Ceratto .

From 1985 to 1989, elected by vote of his fellow composers, he served as Vice President of S.A.D.A.I.C, Argentinian Society of Authors and Composers.

He has shot several films in Mexico, the US and Argentina, including "Los hombres no deben llorar", "El nido", "La hija de nadie", "El cara parchada" y La pandilla inolvidable, among others are. In 1985 he left his profession as a singer when he was elected vice president of Sadaic (in Buenos Aires). He devoted all his time to defend copyright.

In 1990 he decided to become a trader in the Ramos Mejía neighborhood of Buenos Aires, Argentina, with his wife Naomi Ceratto (actress and model). In 2002, his wife and his son Sebastian convinced him to go back on stage. He was presented at the Hollywood Palladium in Los Angeles (California). From then he made successful performances in the best venues of Las Vegas, New York, Texas and Arizona, Mexico, Canada and Europe and is still presented in different Latin American scenarios. Since then he lives with his family in Hollywood, Los Angeles, California.

In January 2012 he was summoned to appear at the two most important festivals of Argentina: Cosquín (Córdoba) and the Festival of Corvina (Formosa). That same year he recorded his folk cantata "La Gran Fiesta Formoseña".

In August 2013, King Clave was recognized by the UN for his interpretation of "Los hombres no deben llorar" song was chosen as music for the international campaign to combat the abuse of women and girls.

In 2013, King Clave released his new album Punto G, produced by his son Sebastian Ayala Ceratto. In 2014, on a tour of Colombia, he received a warm welcome from 17,000 people in "Diamante" baseball Cali Stadium. Today he is on tour throughout the US, and Latin America.

== Personal life ==
On September 21, 1976 he married in Acapulco (Mexico) with Noemi Ceratto (to whom he remains married until today) they had a son named Sebastian Ayala Ceratto.
