= También es Rock =

Tambien es Rock

Studio album by Luis Miguel
- Released: 1984
- Genre: Rock and roll
- Length: 26:23
- Label: EMI
- Producer: Miguel Angel Medina

Luis Miguel chronology
Ya nunca más (1984)	Tambien es Rock (1984)	Palabra de honor (1984)

Tambien es Rock is a studio album released on 1984 by Mexican singer Luis Miguel. All the track are covers mostly from songs by Elvis Presley.

== Track listing ==
#	Title
1	Medley – "Negro es negro" ("Black Is Black"), "Rey criollo" ("King Creole"), "Muévanse todos" ("Twist and Shout"), El rock de la cárcel" ("Jailhouse Rock")
2	Medley – "Nena no me importa" ("Baby I Don't Care"), "Trátame bien" ("Treat Me Nice"), "Ahora o nunca" ("It's Now or Never")
3	Medley – "Aviéntense todos" ("C'mon Everybody"), "Pólvora" ("Dynamite"), "Popotitos" ("Bony Moronie"), "Presumida" ("High Class Baby")
4	Medley – "Perro callejero" ("Hound Dog"), "No seas cruel" ("Don't Be Cruel"), "Osito Teddy" ("Teddy Bear"), "Estremécete" ("All Shook Up")
5	Medley – "Chica alborotada" ("Tallahassee Lassie"), "Confidente de secundaria" ("High School Confidential"), "Buen rock esta noche" ("Good Rockin' Tonight")
6	Medley – "Susy Q" ("Susie Q"), "Memphis" ("Memphis Tennessee"), "Música de rock and roll" ("Rock and Roll Music")
7	Medley – "Al compás del reloj" ("We're Gonna"), Rip It Up, "La marcha de los santos" ("The Saints Rock And Roll"), "Nos vemos cocodrillo" ("See You Later Alligator"), "Lucila" ("Lucille")
