= Palabra de honor (album) =

Studio album by Luis Miguel
- Released: November 9, 1984
- Genre: Latin pop
- Length: 31:38
- Label: EMI
- Producer: Juan Carlos Calderón; Honorio Herrero; Greg Mathieson

Luis Miguel chronology
Tambien es Rock (1984)	Palabra de honor (1984)	Fiebre de amor (1985)

Palabra de honor ("Word of honour") is the fourth studio album released by Mexican performer Luis Miguel on 9 November 1984 with his then record label EMI. It was heavily promoted in México. The single "Isabel" was ranked at number 70 on the VH1 Top 100 of Greatest Songs of the 80's in Spanish. It also includes a duet with Scottish singer Sheena Easton, "Me Gustas Tal Como Eres", which received the Grammy Award for Best Mexican-American Performance. The album peaked at No. 9 in the California's Billboard Top Latin Albums. According to a promotional ad by EMI, the album was certified gold in Mexico and platinum in Argentina.

There is a Portuguese adaptation of the album called Meu Sonho Perdido. The original songs and the Portuguese versions are listed below.

In mid 2023 its track "La Chica Del Bikini Azul" went viral on the Spanish-speaking part of the TikTok platform. This saw an uptick in the song's popularity.

== Track listing ==
1. "Tú No Tienes Corazón" (Honorio Herrero) - 2:39
2. "Un Rock & Roll Sonó" (Juan Carlos Calderón / Honorio Herrero) - 3:04
3. "La Chica Del Bikini Azul" (Honorio Herrero) - 2:56
4. "Lili" (Luis Gómez-Escolar) - 3:28
5. "Palabra de Honor" (Luis Gómez-Escolar / J. Seijas / H. Herrero) - 3:32
6. "Rey de Corazones" (Luis Gómez-Escolar / H. Herrero) - 2:20
7. "Me Muero Por Ti" (Honorio Herrero) - 2:09
8. "Isabel" (J.R. García Florez / J. Giralt) - 2:31
9. "Me Gustas Tal Como Eres" (Duet with Sheena Easton) (J.C. Calderón) - 3:07
10. "Muñeca Rota" (L. Gómez-Escolar / H. Herrero) - 3:13
11. "Háblame" (L. Gómez-Escolar / H. Herrero) - 2:39

=== Portuguese version ===
1. Tu ("Tú No Tienes Corazón") (H. Herrero; Vers: Carlos Colla)
2. Um Rock And Roll Tocou ("Un Rock & Roll Sonó") (J. C. Calderón, H. Herrero; Vers: Carlos Colla)
3. Menina do Biquini Azul ("La Chica Del Bikini Azul") (H. Herrero; Vers: Carlos Colla)
4. Danny ("Lili") (Luiz Gómez Escolar, H. Herrero; Vers: Carlos Colla)
5. Chama-me ("Háblame") (Luiz Gómez Escolar, H. Herrero; Vers: Carlos Colla)
6. Rei, Rei, Rei ("Rey de Corazones") (Luiz Gómez Escolar, H. Herrero; Vers: Carlos Colla)
7. Eu Quero Você ("Me Muero Por Ti") (H. Herrero; Vers: Carlos Colla)
8. Salva-me ("Isabel") (J. R. García Florez, J. Giralt; Vers: Carlos Colla)
9. Meu Sonho Perdido ("Palabra de Honor") (Luiz Gómez Escolar, Julio Seijas, H. Herrero; Vers: Carlos Colla)
10. Mírate (sung in Spanish) (Luiz Gómez Escolar, H. Herrero)
11. Mini Amor (Bonus Track) (Luiz Gómez Escolar, Julio Seijas; Vers: Carlos Colla)

== Certifications and sales ==
Region	Certification	Certified units/sales
Argentina (CAPIF)	Platinum	75,000
Mexico (AMPROFON)	Gold	500,000
