= Soy Como Quiero Ser =

Studio album by Luis Miguel
- Released: July 15, 1987
- Recorded: 1986–1987; Record One; (Sherman Oaks, California); Metropolis Studios; George Tobin Studios; Sunset Sound Studios; (Hollywood, California)
- Genres: Latin pop; R&B; soul
- Length: 39:21
- Language: Spanish
- Label: WEA Latina
- Producer: Juan Carlos Calderón

Luis Miguel chronology
Fiebre de Amor (1985)	Soy Como Quiero Ser (1987)	Busca una Mujer (1988)

Singles from Soy Como Quiero Ser
- 1. "Ahora Te Puedes Marchar" Released: June 8, 1987; 2. "Sin Hablar" Released: 1987; 3. "No Me Puedo Escapar de Tí" Released: 1987; 4. "Cuando Calienta el Sol" Released: 1987; 5. "Soy Como Quiero Ser" Released: 1987; 6. "Yo Que No Vivo Sin Tí" Released: 1988; 7. "Eres Tú" Released: 1988; 8. "Sólo Tú (Only You)" Released: 1988; 9. "Perdóname (All by Myself)" Released: 1988; 10. "Sunny" Released: 1988

Professional ratings
Review scores
Source	Rating
Allmusic	2.5/5 stars

Soy Como Quiero Ser (I Am How I Want to Be) is the fifth studio album by Mexican singer Luis Miguel, released on July 15, 1987, by WEA Latina. It was his first release with WEA. The album was subtitled Luis Miguel '87: Soy Como Quiero Ser. Singers Laura Branigan and Rocío Banquells appear on two of the album's tracks as backing vocals. The majority of the songs included are Spanish-language adaptations of popular songs from the 1960s, 1970s and 1980s.

In 1988, it received a nomination for Best Latin Pop Performance at the 30th Grammy Awards, becoming Luis Miguel's second Grammy nomination.

== Track listing ==
#	Title	Composer	Time
1	Es Mejor (Reach Out I'll Be There)	Lamont Dozier/Eddie Holland/Brian Holland/Alejandro Monroy/Carlos Villa	3:51
2	Sin Hablar (Duet with Laura Branigan)	Juan Carlos Calderón	4:30
3	Ahora Te Puedes Marchar (I Only Want to Be With You)	Ivor Raymonde/Mike Hawker/Luis Gómez-Escolar	3:15
4	Yo Que No Vivo Sin Tí (You Don't Have to Say You Love Me)	Pino Donaggio/Vito Pallavicini/Luis Gómez-Escolar	3:31
5	Eres Tú	Juan Carlos Calderón	4:11
6	Sólo Tú (Only You)	Andy Rande/Buck Ram/Carlos Toro	3:21
7	No Me Puedo Escapar de Tí (Duet with Rocío Banquells)	Juan Carlos Calderón	3:31
8	Cuando Calienta el Sol (Love Me with All Your Heart)	Rafael Gastón Pérez/Carlos Rigual/Mario Rigual/Carlos Alberto Martinoli	3:57
9	Soy Como Quiero Ser	Luisito Rey	2:55
10	Perdóname (All by Myself)	Eric Carmen/Carlos Toro	3:31
11	Sunny	Bobby Hebb/Luis Gómez-Escolar	3:18

=== Portuguese version ===
A Portuguese version was released in 1988 and is referred to as Luis Miguel '88 instead of '87. It was released as a vinyl LP and on Cassette only.

Side A

1. Es Mejor
2. Sin Hablar
3. Agora Você Pode Ir (Ahora Te Puedes Marchar)
4. Eu Que Não Vivo Sem Você (Yo Que No Vivo Sin Tí)
5. Era Você (Eres Tú)
6. Solo Tu

Side B

1. No Me Puedo Escapar de Ti
2. Cuando Calienta El Sol
3. Soy Como Quiero Ser
4. Perdoname
5. Sunny

== Chart performance ==
Year	Chart	Track	Peak
1987	Billboard Hot Latin Tracks	Ahora Te Puedes Marchar	1
1988	Billboard Hot Latin Tracks	No Me Puedo Escapar de Tí (duet with Rocio Banquells)	14
1988	Billboard Hot Latin Tracks	Yo Que No Vivo Sin Tí	26
1988	Billboard Hot Latin Tracks	Soy Como Quiero Ser	36
1988	Billboard Hot Latin Tracks	Cuando Calienta El Sol	50

== Sales and certifications ==
Region	Certification	Certified units/sales
Argentina (CAPIF)	3× Platinum	180,000^{^}
Chile	Gold	
Mexico (AMPROFON)	5× Platinum	1,250,000^{^}
Spain (Promusicae)	Platinum	100,000^{^}
Summaries
Worldwide	—	2,000,000
^{^} Shipments figures based on certification alone.

== Personnel ==
- Producer: Juan Carlos Calderón
- Executive Producer: Luisito Rey
- Arrangements on "Sin Hablar", "Cuando Calienta el Sol", "Sólo Tú" and "Yo Que No Vivo Sin Tí" by Juan Carlos Calderón
- Arrangements on "No Me Puedo Escapar De Tí", "Ahora Te Puedes Marchar" and "Eres Tú" by K. C. Porter
- Arrangements on "Es Mejor" and "Sunny" by: Randy Kerber
- Arrangements on: "Perdóname" and "Soy Como Quiero Ser" by Erich Bulling.
- Bass: Dennis Bellfield
- Drums: Carlos Vega and Paul Leim
- Guitars: Dan Huff and Paul Jackson Jr.
- Keyboards: Randy Kerber, Juan Carlos Calderón and K. C. Porter
- Percussion: Paulinho DaCosta
- Piano: Randy Kerber
- Saxophone solos: Joel Peskin
- Strings: Ezra Kilger
- Horns on "Es Mejor": Jerry Hey, Mark Russo, Bill Richenbach and Gary Grant.
- Horns on "Cuando Calienta El Sol": Burnette Dillon, Charles Davis, Jim sawyer and Joseph Johnson
- Background vocals: Tony DeFranco, K. C. Porter, Isela Sotelo and Darlene Kolden-Hoven
- Photography: Randee St. Nicholas

== See also ==
- List of best-selling albums in Mexico
- List of best-selling Latin albums
