= Un sol =

...Un Sol

Studio album by Luis Miguel
- Released: January 21, 1982
- Recorded: 1981
- Genre: Latin pop
- Length: 27:29
- Label: EMI Mexico
- Producer: Jose Enrique Okamura; (executive production); Luisito Rey; (artistic production)

Luis Miguel chronology
...Un Sol (1982)	Directo Al Corazón (1982)

Un Sol (stylized as ...Un Sol), also known as 1 + 1 = 2 Enamorados, is the debut studio album by Mexican singer Luis Miguel. Released in 1982, when Miguel was eleven years old, the album peaked at number two at the California's "Hot Latin LPs".

Four songs from the album were done in Portuguese and released as two different singles in Brazil. According to the Brazilian newspaper A Luta Democrática, the single "1 + 1 = Dois Apaixonados" was certified gold there while the single "Mentira" sold 80,000 copies in the country. The success motivated the label to plan an album by the singer with songs in Brazilian Portuguese.

According to different sources the album sold around 700,000 copies in Miguel's home country, earning a gold and platinum certification there, and one million copies in Mexico alone. In Argentina it sold over 10,000 copies. The single "1 + 1 = 2 Enamorados" sold 750,000 units.

== Track listing ==
- Source

#	Title	Composer	Time
1	1 + 1 = 2 Enamorados	Rubén Amado / Javier Santos	3:35
2	Amor De Escuela	Octavio	3:08
3	Tomemos Los Patines (Prendiamo I Pattini) *	M. Fabrizio / R. Fogli / G. Morra - Adapt: Miguel A. Medina	3:10
4	Hay Un Algo *	Luisito Rey	3:19
5	Lo Que Me Gusta	Juan Gabriel	2:47
6	Balada Para Mi Abuela *	King Clave	2:45
7	Mentira	Juan Gabriel	2:54
8	El Tiempo *	Luisito Rey	2:50
9	Adolescente Soñador	Rubén Amado / Javier Santos	3:01

Musical direction and arrangements by Chucho Ferrer except (*) Peque Rossino.

== Certifications and sales ==
Region	Certification	Certified units/sales
Argentina	—	10,000
Mexico (AMPROFON)	Platinum+Gold	1,000,000
Summaries
Worldwide	—	1,500,000
