= Directo al corazón =

Studio album by Luis Miguel
- Released: 1982
- Genre: Latin pop
- Length: 28:04
- Label: EMI
- Producer: Jose Enrique Okamura

Luis Miguel chronology
Un sol (1982)	Directo al corazón (1982)	Decídete (1983)

Directo al corazón (Straight to the heart) is the second album released by Mexican singer Luis Miguel and was released in 1982. The album sold around 900,000 copies in Mexico, and 115,000 copies in Argentina, where it was certified Platinum.

== Track listing ==
#	Title	Composer	Time
1	Directo Al Corazón *	Rubén Amado / Javier Santos	2:44
2	Recuerdos Encadenados	Rubén Amado / Javier Santos	3:04
3	Lo Lei En Tu Diario	Miguel Tottis / Carlos Gaviola	3:03
4	A Mis Años Ya Te Amo	Rubén Amado / Javier Santos	2:58
5	Nosotros Dos *	Oscar Nicolini	2:58
6	Rock de La Niña Cruel *	Rubén Amado / Javier Santos	2:28
7	Marcela	Luisito Rey	2:50
8	Si Ves A Mi Chica, Dile Que La Amo *	Rubén Amado / Javier Santos	2:34
9	No Es Permitido	Nano Concha	2:59
10	La Juventud *	Rubén Amado	2:26

Musical direction and arrangements by Peque Rossino except (*) Chucho Ferrer

== Charts ==
Chart (1983)	Peak position
Argentine Albums (CAPIF)	1

== Certifications and sales ==
Region	Certification	Certified units/sales
Argentina (CAPIF)	Platinum	115,000
Mexico (AMPROFON)	2× Platinum	900,000
