= Ya nunca más (soundtrack) =

Soundtrack album by Luis Miguel
- Released: 1984
- Recorded: 1983
- Genre: Latin pop
- Length: 22:19
- Label: EMI
- Producer: J. Enrique Rossino

Luis Miguel chronology
Decídete (1983)	Ya nunca más (1984)	También es Rock (1984)

Ya nunca más (Never again) is a soundtrack album for a movie of the same title by Luis Miguel, which was released in 1984. Miguel had a major role in the film of the same name which was his film debut.

== Track listing ==
#	Title	Composer	Time
1	Ya Nunca Más	Luisito Rey	2:39
2	La Juventud	Rubén Amado	2:39
3	Juegos De Amigos (Instrumental)	Miguel A. Medina / Oscar Nicolini	2:30
4	Mamá, Mamá	Luisito Rey	3:07
5	Juegos De Amigos	Miguel A. Medina / Oscar Nicolini	2:41
6	La Juventud (Instrumental)	Rubén Amado	2:23
7	Ora Pronobis	Luisito Rey	3:42
8	Ya Nunca Más (Instrumental)	Luisito Rey	2:38

Musical arrangement: Chucho Ferrer and Peque Rossino
