= Decídete =

Studio album by Luis Miguel
- Released: 1983
- Recorded: July – September 1983
- Studio: Estudios Kirios (Madrid, Spain)
- Genre: Latin pop
- Length: 31:34
- Label: EMI
- Producer: Honorio Herrero

Luis Miguel chronology
Directo al corazón (1982)	Decídete (1983)	Ya nunca más (1984)

Decídete (Decide) is the third album released by Mexican singer Luis Miguel Gallego Basteri. It was released in 1983.

There are two versions of Decídete's title track. The original version was deemed too explicit as it contained suggestive lyrics referring to a teenage couple's first sexual encounter, so it was replaced with more tender lyrics about teenage romance.

== Track listing ==
#	Title	Composer	Time
1	Decídete	Honorio Herrero	2:59
2	Lupe	Honorio Herrero	3:06
3	No Me Puedes Dejar Así	Honorio Herrero / Luis G. Escolar	3:21
4	Safari	Luis G. Escolar / Julio Seijas	3:21
5	Bandido Cupido	Honorio Herrero	2:15
6	Campeón	Honorio Herrero / Luis G. Escolar	3:31
7	El Brujo (Yummy, Yummy, Yummy)	Joey Levine / Arthur Resnick – Adapt: Honorio Herrero	3:31
8	En Japón	Honorio Herrero	3:01
9	Soy Como Soy	José Ramón García Florez	3:04
10	Mini Amor	Luis G. Escolar / Julio Seijas	3:25

== Charts ==
Chart (1984)	Peak position
Spanish Albums (Promusicae)	14

== Certifications and sales ==
Region	Certification	Certified units/sales
Argentina	—	50,000
Brazil (Pro-Música Brasil) for Decide Amor	Gold	100,000^{*}
Mexico (AMPROFON)	2× Platinum	500,000^{^}
^{*} Sales figures based on certification alone.^{^} Shipments figures based on certification alone.
