= 20 Años Tour =

1990–91 concert tour by Luis Miguel

- Tour by Luis Miguel
- Associated album: 20 Años
- Start date: July 12, 1990
- End date: June 1, 1991
- Legs: 1
- No. of shows: TBD

Luis Miguel concert chronology
- Busca Una Mujer Tour (1989–90); 20 Años Tour (1990–91); Romance Tour (1991–92)

The 20 Años Tour was a concert tour performed by Luis Miguel during the years 1990 and 1991 to promote his last album 20 Años. On this tour he performed more than 10 sold-out concerts at the Centro de Espectáculos Premier in Mexico City, that season of concerts was recorded to later launch a VHS Video called Luis Miguel: 20 Años.

== Set list ==
This set list is representative of the shows in Centro de Espectáculos Premier. It does not represent all dates throughout the tour.

1. "Introduction"
2. "Oro De Ley"
3. "Yo Que No Vivo Sin Ti"
4. "Amante del amor"
5. "Pupilas de Gato"
6. "Culpable o No"
7. "Hoy El Aire Huele a Ti"
8. "Más Allá de Todo"
9. "Ahora Te Puedes Marchar"
10. "Il Cielo" (in Italian)
11. "Alguien Como Tú"
12. "Entrégate"
13. "Fría Como el Viento"
14. "Strana Gelosia" (in Italian)
15. "Tengo Todo Excepto a Ti"
16. "Interlude" (Band)
17. "Será Que No Me Amas"
18. Trio Medley (with the trio "Los Pao"):
  - "Un Poco Más"
  - "Llévatela"
  - "El Reloj"
  - "Sabor a Mí"
  - "Contigo Aprendí"
19. "De Que Manera Te Olvido" (with the trio "Los Pao")
20. "Como Fue" (with the trio "Los Pao")
21. "Un Hombre Busca Una Mujer"
22. "La Incondicional"
23. "Cuando Calienta El Sol"

== Tour dates ==
List of concerts, showing date, city, country and venue
Date	City	Country	Venue
North America
July 12, 1990	Mexico City	Mexico	Hotel Crowne Plaza
August 10, 1990	Guadalajara	Mexico	Hotel Fiesta Americana
August 11, 1990	Guadalajara	Mexico	Auditorio Benito Juarez
South America
September 18, 1990	Caracas	Venezuela	Teatro Teresa Carreño
September 19, 1990	Caracas	Venezuela	Teatro Teresa Carreño
September ?, 1990	Valencia	Venezuela	—
September 22, 1990	Barquisimeto	Venezuela	Club Canario Larense
September ?, 1990	Puerto Ordaz	Venezuela	Polideportivo Cachamay
September 29, 1990	Caracas	Venezuela	Poliedro de Caracas
September 30, 1990	Maracaibo	Venezuela	El Lago Country Club
North America
October 7, 1990 (Note: Gala concert called "México en la Música" with various artists as Daniela Romo, Los Bukis, Manuel Mijares, Marco Antonio Muñiz and others.)	New York City	United States	Madison Square Garden
October 12, 1990	San Juan	Puerto Rico	Centro de Convenciones
October 13, 1990	San Juan	Puerto Rico	Centro de Convenciones
October 14, 1990	Mayagüez	Puerto Rico	Palacio de Recreación y Deportes
October ?, 1990	Mexico City	Mexico	—
October ?, 1990	Puebla	Mexico	Universidad de las Américas Puebla
October ?, 1990	Culiacán	Mexico	—
October ?, 1990	Toluca	Mexico	—
November ?, 1990	Mexico City	Mexico	—
November ?, 1990	Mexico City	Mexico	—
November ?, 1990	Mexico City	Mexico	—
November ?, 1990	Xalapa	Mexico	—
November 18, 1990	Salina Cruz	Mexico	—
November 19, 1990	Oaxaca	Mexico	—
November 20, 1990	Villahermosa	Mexico	—
November 22, 1990	Aguascalientes	Mexico	—
November 23, 1990	Cuernavaca	Mexico	—
November 24, 1990	Mexico City	Mexico	—
November 25, 1990	Mexico City	Mexico	—
December 11, 1990	Mexico City	Mexico	Quetzal
December 12, 1990	Mexico City	Mexico	Quetzal
December 13, 1990	Mexico City	Mexico	Quetzal
December 14, 1990	Guadalajara	Mexico	Discoteque Dady'O
December 15, 1990	Zamora	Mexico	—
December 16, 1990	Naucalpan	Mexico	Auditorio Lomas Verdes
December 20, 1990	Torreón	Mexico	Estadio Revolución
December 21, 1990	Monterrey	Mexico	Plaza de Toros Monumental
December 22, 1990	Reynosa	Mexico	—
December ?, 1990	Mexico City	Mexico	—
December 28, 1990	Acapulco	Mexico	Hard Rock Cafe
February 6, 1991	Mexico City	Mexico	Premios Eres
February 9, 1991	Mexico City	Mexico	Centro de Espectáculos Premier
February 14, 1991	Mexico City	Mexico	Centro de Espectáculos Premier
February 15, 1991	Mexico City	Mexico	Centro de Espectáculos Premier
February 16, 1991	Mexico City	Mexico	Centro de Espectáculos Premier
February 23, 1991	Ciudad Juárez	Mexico	Gimnasio Universitario UACJ
Central America
March 8, 1991	San José	Costa Rica	Country Club
March 9, 1991	Heredia	Costa Rica	Palacio de los Deportes
March 10, 1991	Heredia	Costa Rica	Palacio de los Deportes
North America
March 15, 1991	Mexico City	Mexico	Centro Asturiano
March 16, 1991	Texcoco	Mexico	Estadio de Beisbol
March 17, 1991	Mexico City	Mexico	Siempre en Domingo
South America
March 19, 1991 (Note: The March 19 concert in Bogotá was partially broadcast in Colombia by Caracol Televisión.)	Bogotá	Colombia	Teatro La Castellana
March 20, 1991	Barranquilla	Colombia	Estadio Metropolitano Roberto Meléndez
March 22, 1991	Bogotá	Colombia	Coliseo Cubierto El Campín
March 23, 1991	Cali	Colombia	Estadio Olímpico Pascual Guerrero
March 25, 1991	Bucaramanga	Colombia	Estadio Alfonso López
Europe
April 8, 1991	Madrid	Spain	Teatro Alcalá Palace
April 11, 1991	Barcelona	Spain	Sala Studio 54
South America
May 18, 1991	Valencia	Venezuela	Teatro Municipal de Valencia
North America
June 1, 1991	Acapulco	Mexico	Festival de Acapulco

- Note: A lot of dates and venues are missing, and others may be wrong, due to the lack of reliable sources.

== Band ==
- Vocals: Luis Miguel
- Musical director: Juan Carlos Toribio
- Acoustic & electric guitar: Kiko Cibrian
- Bass: Rudy Machorro
- Piano & keyboards: Juan Carlos Toribio
- Keyboards: Arturo Pérez
- Drums: Fernando Caballero
- Percussion & chorus: Alfredo Algarin
- Saxophone:
- Trumpet: Juan Manuel Arpero
- Trumpet: José Villar
- Backing vocals: Patricia Tanus
- Trio: Los Pao
