= Busca Una Mujer Tour =

1989–90 concert tour by Luis Miguel

- Tour by Luis Miguel
- Associated album: Busca una Mujer
- Start date: January 30, 1989
- End date: May 4, 1990
- Legs: 1
- No. of shows: TBD

Luis Miguel concert chronology
- Soy Como Quiero Ser Tour (1987–88); Busca Una Mujer Tour (1989–90); 20 Años Tour (1990–91)

The Busca Una Mujer Tour was a concert tour performed by Luis Miguel during 1989 and 1990 to promote his sixth studio album Busca una Mujer. In 1989 a VHS video compiling his presentations in Mexico, called Un Año de Conciertos, was released.

== Set list ==
This set list is representative of one show in Hotel Crowne Plaza, Mexico City. It does not represent all dates throughout the tour.

1. "Introduction"
2. "Soy Como Quiero Ser"
3. "Sunny"
4. "Es Mejor"
5. "Perdoname"
6. "Separados"
7. "Yo Que No Vivo Sin Ti"
8. "Ahora Te Puedes Marchar"
9. "Culpable O No"
10. "Isabel"
11. "Yesterday" (The Beatles cover)
12. "Pupilas de Gato"
13. Duets Medley:
  - "Sin Hablar"
  - "No Me Puedo Escapar de Ti"
  - "Me Gustas Tal Como Eres"
14. "Siempre Me Quedo, Siempre Me Voy"
15. "Cucurrucucú Paloma"
16. "Fría Como el Viento"
17. "Por Favor Señora"
18. "Soy Un Perdedor"
19. "La Incondicional"
20. "Un Hombre Busca Una Mujer"
21. "Cuando Calienta El Sol"
22. "Palabra De Honor"

== Tour dates ==
List of concerts, showing date, city, country and venue
Date	City	Country	Venue
South America
January 30, 1989	Mar del Plata	Argentina	Teatro Hotel Hermitage
February 2, 1989	Itá	Paraguay	Club Sportivo Iteño
February 9, 1989	Buenos Aires	Argentina	Teatro Opera
February 10, 1989	Buenos Aires	Argentina	Teatro Opera
February 11, 1989	Buenos Aires	Argentina	Teatro Opera
February 25, 1989	Cosquín	Argentina	Plaza Prospero Molina
March 4, 1989	Rosario	Argentina	Estadio Cubierto Newell's Old Boys
March 11, 1989	Córdoba	Argentina	Club Atenas
April 6, 1989	Buenos Aires	Argentina	Teatro Opera
April 7, 1989	Buenos Aires	Argentina	Teatro Opera
April 8, 1989	Buenos Aires	Argentina	Teatro Opera
April 9, 1989	Buenos Aires	Argentina	Teatro Opera
North America
April 25, 1989	Mexico City	Mexico	Hotel Crowne Plaza
April 26, 1989	Mexico City	Mexico	Hotel Crowne Plaza
April 27, 1989	Mexico City	Mexico	Hotel Crowne Plaza
April 28, 1989	Mexico City	Mexico	Hotel Crowne Plaza
April 29, 1989	Mexico City	Mexico	Hotel Crowne Plaza
April 30, 1989	Mexico City	Mexico	Siempre en Domingo
May 3, 1989	Monterrey	Mexico	—
May ?, 1989	Matamoros	Mexico	—
May 6, 1989	Reynosa	Mexico	Plaza de Toros Reynosa
May 12, 1989	Mexico City	Mexico	Auditorio Nacional
May 14, 1989	León	Mexico	Estadio La Martinica
May 20, 1989	Guadalajara	Mexico	Expo Guadalajara
May 21, 1989	Guadalajara	Mexico	Expo Guadalajara
May 27, 1989	Ciudad Madero	Mexico	Centro de Convenciones
May 28, 1989	Ciudad Madero	Mexico	Centro de Convenciones
June 2, 1989	Torreón	Mexico	Auditorio Municipal
June 4, 1989	Ciudad Juárez	Mexico	Gimnasio Universitario UACJ
June 9, 1989	San Diego	United States	Civic Theatre
June 11, 1989	Phoenix	United States	Celebrity Theatre
June 23, 1989	San Luis Potosí	Mexico	Parque Tangamanga
June 25, 1989	Guadalajara	Mexico	Coliseo Olímpico
July 1, 1989	Mexico City	Mexico	Hotel Crowne Plaza
July 4, 1989 (Note: TV show hosted by Verónica Castro in which he perform his usual repertoire, plus a few mariachi songs and four songs with Armando Manzanero on the piano, in addition to an interview of more than an hour.)	Mexico City	Mexico	Aquí Está
July 7, 1989	Mérida	Mexico	Club Campestre
August 2, 1989	Agua Prieta	Mexico	Centro de Espectáculos El Griego
Central America
August 4, 1989	San José	Costa Rica	Gimnasio Nacional
August 5, 1989	San José	Costa Rica	Gimnasio Nacional
August 11, 1989	Escuintla	Guatemala	Hotel El Dorado
August 12, 1989	Guatemala City	Guatemala	Estadio del Ejército
August 13, 1989	San Salvador	El Salvador	Teatro Presidente
South America
August 16, 1989	Santiago	Chile	Siempre en Lunes
September 29, 1989	Tegucigalpa	Honduras	Gimnasio Ruballejas
September 30, 1989	Tegucigalpa	Honduras	Gimnasio Ruballejas
October 2, 1989	San Pedro Sula	Honduras	Gimnasio Municipal
October 19, 1989	Caracas	Venezuela	Teatro Teresa Carreño
February 23, 1990	Viña del Mar	Chile	Quinta Vergara Amphitheater
February 24, 1990	Viña del Mar	Chile	Quinta Vergara Amphitheater
March 2, 1990	Santiago	Chile	Estadio Santa Laura
March 9, 1990	Buenos Aires	Argentina	Teatro Opera
March 10, 1990	Buenos Aires	Argentina	Teatro Opera
March ?, 1990	Cochabamba	Bolivia	—
March 16, 1990	Oruro	Bolivia	Estadio Jesús Bermúdez
March 17, 1990	La Paz	Bolivia	—
March 21, 1990	Lima	Peru	Coliseo del Colegio San Agustín
March 22, 1990	Lima	Peru	Coliseo del Colegio San Agustín
March 23, 1990	Lima	Peru	Estadio Nacional
Central America
March ?, 1990	Panama City	Panama	—
North America
April 19, 1990	Phoenix	United States	Phoenix Civic Plaza
April 20, 1990	Los Angeles	United States	Los Angeles Memorial Sports Arena
April 21, 1990	Chicago	United States	UIC Pavilion
April 22, 1990	San Diego	United States	San Diego Sports Arena
April 25, 1990	McAllen	United States	Villa Real Convention Center
April 26, 1990	Laredo	United States	Laredo Civic Center Auditorium
April 27, 1990	San Antonio	United States	Freeman Coliseum
April 28, 1990	Miami	United States	James L. Knight Center
April 29, 1990	San Jose	United States	San Jose State Recreational Center
May 2, 1990	Houston	United States	Sam Houston Coliseum
May 3, 1990	Dallas	United States	Dallas Convention Center
May 4, 1990	El Paso	United States	El Paso County Coliseum

- Note: A lot of dates and venues are missing due to the lack of reliable sources.

== Cancelled shows ==
List of cancelled concerts, showing date, city, country, venue, and reason for cancellation
Date	City	Country	Venue	Reason
February 3, 1989	Asunción	Paraguay	Estadio Defensores del Chaco	Paraguayan coup d'état
June 24, 1989	Irapuato	Mexico	Estadio Sergio León Chávez	Security issues

== Band ==
- Vocals: Luis Miguel
- Guitar: Hector Hermosillo
- Bass: Jaime de la Parra (1989), Rudy Machorro (1990)
- Piano & keyboards: Heriberto Hermosillo
- Keyboards: Jorge René González
- Drums: Álvaro López, Fernando Caballero (1990)
- Percussion: Julio Vera
- Saxophone: Adolfo Díaz
- Backing vocals: Marina Rivera, Silvia Rivera, Renata Rivera
