= Luis Miguel: The Series =

Spanish-language American TV series

- Spanish: Luis Miguel: La serie
- Genre: Biographical
- Directed by: Humberto Hinojosa; Natalia Beristáin
- Starring: Diego Boneta; Óscar Jaenada; Izan Llunas; Paulina Dávila; Martín Bello; Anna Favella; César Bordón; Juanpa Zurita; Vanessa Bauche; Camila Sodi; Macarena Achaga; Fernando Guallar; Pablo Cruz; Teresa Ruiz; Juan Ignacio Cané; Jade Ewen; Sebastián Zurita
- Country of origin: United States
- Original language: Spanish
- No. of seasons: 3
- No. of episodes: 27

Production
- Executive producers: Diego Boneta; Óscar Jaenada; Daniel Krauze; Antonio Cue; Miguel Alemán; José Luis Ramírez; Carla González Vargas; Mark Burnett; Luis Miguel; Pablo Cruz
- Camera setup: Multi-camera
- Production companies: Gato Grande Productions; MGM Television

Original release
- Network: Telemundo
- Release: 22 April – 15 July 2018
- Network: Netflix
- Release: 18 April – 28 October 2021

Luis Miguel: The Series (Spanish: Luis Miguel: La serie) is a Spanish-language American biographical television series produced by Gato Grande Productions along with MGM Television for Netflix and Telemundo. It is an authorized version on the life of the Mexican singer Luis Miguel. It stars Diego Boneta as the titular character. Filming began on November 16, 2017.

On 22 April 2018, Karla Gonzales, series showrunner, confirmed that the show has been renewed for a second season. On 7 January 2020, it was confirmed that the shooting of the second season would begin in February 2020 and that the season is scheduled to be released in the same year. However, in April 2020, the shooting of the second season was put on hold due to the COVID-19 pandemic and on May 21, 2020, it was announced that the season would be released on April 18, 2021. On May 30, 2021, it was announced that the series was renewed for a third and final season, which premiered on October 28, 2021.

== Plot ==
Before being known as Luis Miguel, Micky, as his family called him, finds a great satisfaction, love, and security alongside his beloved mother Marcela (Anna Favella) and his younger brother Alex (Juanpa Zurita). A singer of natural talent, he begins gaining recognition and popularity until he turns 11, when his father, Luis Rey (Óscar Jaenada), obsessively gives himself the task of turning his son into the superstar that he himself did not manage to be. As Micky grows and becomes a pop star of the time, with the name of Luis Miguel (Diego Boneta), problems associated with fame and protecting his private life and his great loves begin. While the world falls in love with the masculine image of a tanned young man with a beautiful smile and fascinating lifestyle in Acapulco, which was the hallmark of his career, what lies behind this reality is how fame and fortune can impact a family.

== Cast and characters ==
Legend
= Main cast (credited)
= Recurring cast (2+)
= Guest cast (1)

Character	Portrayed by	Seasons		
Character	Portrayed by	1	2	3
Main
Luis Miguel	Diego Boneta	Main	Main	Main
Luisito Rey	Óscar Jaenada	Main	Archive footage (Note: Video footage of the character is shown during the second episode of the second season, but is not credited.)	Main (Note: Óscar Jaenada is credited as a series regular in the fifth episode of season three.)
Child Luis Miguel	Izan Llunas	Main (Note: Izan Llunas is credited as a series regular from 1x01 through 1x07.)	Archive footage (Note: Video footage of the character is shown during the second and third seasons, but is not credited.)	Archive footage
Mariana Yazbek	Paulina Dávila	Main (Note: Paulina Dávila is credited as a series regular from 1x01 through 1x04.)		
Tito	Martín Bello	Main	Guest	
Marcela Basteri	Anna Favella	Main	Archive footage (Note: Video footage of the character is shown during the second episode of the second season, but is not credited.)	Main (Note: Anna Favella is credited as a series regular in the fifth episode of season three.)
Hugo López	César Bordón	Main (Note: César Bordón is credited as a series regular from 1x01 through 2x05.)	Main	Guest
Alex Basteri	Juanpa Zurita	Main (Note: Juanpa Zurita is credited as a series regular in the episodes in which he appears.)	Main	Main
Rosy Esquivel	Vanessa Bauche	Main		
Young Luis Miguel	Luis de la Rosa	Main (Note: Luis de la Rosa is credited as a series regular from 1x08 through 1x13.)		Guest
Erika	Camila Sodi	Main (Note: Camila Sodi is credited as a series regular from 1x08 through 2x03. For the rest of the episodes, she is credited a guest star.)	Main	
Mauricio Ambrosi	Fernando Guallar		Main	Main
Patricio Robles	Pablo Cruz		Main	Main
Michelle Salas	Macarena Achaga		Main (Note: Macarena Achaga is credited as a series regular from 2x04 onwards in season two after guest starring in 2x03. In season three she is credited in the third and sixth episodes.)	Main
Mariah Carey	Jade Ewen			Main (Note: Jade Ewen is credited as a series regular from 3x01 through 3x05.)
Azucena	Teresa Ruiz		Recurring	Main (Note: Teresa Ruiz is credited as a series regular in the episodes in which she appears.)
José Pérez	Juan Ignacio Cané		Recurring	Main
Adult Alex Basteri	Sebastián Zurita			Main
Humberto	Plutarco Haza			Main
Adult Miguel Alemán	Carlos Ponce			Main

=== Main ===
- Diego Boneta as Luis Miguel
- Izan Llunas as Child Luis Miguel (season 1)
- Luis de la Rosa as Young Luis Miguel (season 1; guest season 3)
- Óscar Jaenada as Luis Rey (seasons 1, 3)
- Camila Sodi as Erika, based on Issabela Camil (seasons 1–2)
- Martín Bello as Tito (season 1; guest season 2)
- Anna Favella as Marcela Basteri (seasons 1, 3)
- César Bordón as Hugo López (seasons 1–2; guest season 3)
- Juanpa Zurita as Alex Basteri
- Paulina Dávila as Mariana Yazbek (season 1)
- Vanessa Bauche as Rosy Esquivel (season 1)
- Macarena Achaga as Michelle Salas (seasons 2–3)
- Fernando Guallar as Mauricio Ambrosi (seasons 2–3)
- Pablo Cruz as Patricio Robles (seasons 2–3)
- Teresa Ruiz as Azucena (season 3; recurring season 2)
- Juan Ignacio Cané as José Pérez (season 3; recurring season 2)
- Jade Ewen as Mariah Carey (season 3)
- Sebastián Zurita as Adult Alex Basteri (season 3)

=== Recurring and guest ===
- Alfonso Borbolla as Raúl Velasco (season 1)
- León Peraza as Andrés García (season 1)
- Alberto Caneva as Sergio Basteri (season 1)
- Sergio Lanza as Juan Carlos Calderón
- César Santa Ana as Alex McCluskey (seasons 1–2; guest season 3)
- Javier Gómez as Jaime Camil Garza (season 1; guest season 2)
- Lola Casamayor as Matilde Sánchez Repiso (season 2; guest season 1)
- Vicente Tamayo as Bobby, based on Roberto Palazuelos (season 1)
- Alexis Ortega as Burro, based on Jorge van Rankin (season 1)
- Kevin Holt as Miguel Alemán Magnani
- Gabriel Nuncio as El Doc
- Pilar Santacruz as Sophie, based on Stephanie Salas (season 2; guest season 1)
- Andrés Almeida as Armando Serna
- Arturo Barba as El Tigre Azcárraga, based on Emilio Azcárraga Milmo (season 1)
- Mario Zaragoza as General Durazo, based on Arturo Durazo Moreno (season 1)
- Hugo Catalán as Moro, based on Alejandro González Iñárritu
- Albi De Abreu as Miguel Ángel Villegas
- Isabel Burr as Adela Noriega (season 1)
- Marcela Guirado as Verónica Castro
- Sofía Castro as Alina
- Karla Carrillo as Conductora MTV
- Aurora Gil (season 1) and Rocío Verdejo (season 2) as Cynthia Casas
- Viridiana Olvera as Pati Chapoy
- Pierre David as Armando Manzanero
- Daniel Cubillo as Bebu Silvetti
- Fatima Molina as Paola Moreno (season 2)
- Amparo Barcia as Sasha Sökol
- Valery Sais as young Michelle (season 2)
- Axel Llunas as young Sergio Basteri
- Guy Pennacchio as Frank Sinatra (Season 2)
- Ximena Ayala as Adriana (Season 1)
- Mariela Garriga as Daysi Fuentes

=== Cameo appearances ===
- Luis Miguel as Himself
- Jorge van Rankin as Himself
- Toño Mauri as Himself
- Alejandro Basteri as Himself
- Michael Ronda as Diego Boneta

== Broadcast history ==
On 9 April 2018, Telemundo published through its website Now Telemundo a preview of the first episode entitled "Primera Mirada". The first episode of the series premiered on 12 April 2018 during an exclusive screening held in Beverly Hills, California, as part of the presentation of the series, Its official premiere was on 22 April 2018 on Telemundo at 9pm/8c, and in Spain and Latin America on Netflix after its broadcast on television, each episode is broadcast every Sunday.

== Television ratings ==
Viewership and ratings per season of Luis Miguel: The Series
Season	Timeslot (ET)	Episodes	First aired		Last aired		Avg. viewers (millions)	18–49 rank
Season	Timeslot (ET)	Episodes	Date	Viewers (millions)	Date	Viewers (millions)	Avg. viewers (millions)	18–49 rank
1	Sunday 9:00 p.m.	13	22 April 2018	0.95	15 July 2018	0.74	0.77	TBD

== Episodes ==
Season	Episodes	Originally released		
Season	Episodes	First released	Last released	Network
1	13	April 22, 2018	July 15, 2018	Telemundo
2	8	April 18, 2021	May 30, 2021	Netflix
3	6	October 28, 2021		Netflix

=== Season 1 (2018) ===
No. overall	No. in season	Title	Directed by	Written by	Original release date	US viewers (millions)
1	1	"Cuando calienta el sol" "Nace El Sol de México (Note: Titles of its broadcast by Telemundo.)"	Humberto Hinojosa	Susana Casares & Daniel Krauze	22 April 2018	0.95
Luis Rey, the father of Luis Miguel discovers the enormous talent of his son at 10 years old and is responsible for managing his career and personal life. While, Micky meets his first love, Mariana Yazbek.
2	2	"La Malagueña" "Luis Miguel despide a su padre"	Natalia Beristáin & Humberto Hinojosa	Susana Casares & Carolina Rivera	29 April 2018	0.88
Micky sings on TV, for the first time. Luis Rey tries to get Michael Jackson for a duet with his son. After obeying his father for many years and being exploited at will, Luis Miguel opens his eyes to so many lies, demands and manipulation.
3	3	"Yo que no vivo sin ti" "Marcela se humilla por su hijo"	Natalia Beristáin & Humberto Hinojosa	Flavia Atencio & Susana Casares	6 May 2018	0.82
Luis Rey manages to have Micky sing at the wedding of the daughter of the president of Mexico: he uses Marcela, turning a blind eye to a powerful man who wants her. Luis Miguel looks for his own style.
4	4	"Culpable o no" "Luis Miguel rompe con Mariana"	Natalia Beristáin & Humberto Hinojosa	Susana Casares	13 May 2018	0.83
Luis Miguel is devastated by his break with his first love and the composer, Juan Carlos Calderón, is inspired by his pain and writes "Culpable o No", one of his most emblematic themes. Alex finds a letter from Marcela and he gets mad at Luis Miguel, believing that he betrayed him.
5	5	"La chica del bikini azul" "El padre de Luismi lo estafa"	Humberto Hinojosa	Daniel Krauze	20 May 2018	0.87
Luis Miguel, isolated in his spiral of evasion, alcohol and sex, does not know that his father and uncle divert funds to accounts in Switzerland. A fan ends up in the hospital, due to the recklessness of Luis Miguel.
6	6	"Mamá Mamá" "Luis Rey droga a Mickey"	Humberto Hinojosa	Flavia Atencio & José Luis Gutiérrez Arias	27 May 2018	0.62
The ambition of Luis Rey has no boundaries; he bribes a doctor to prescribe Luis Miguel's ephedrine, and so he continues with the film and his concerts.
7	7	"La Incondicional" "Luis Miguel abre los ojos"	Humberto Hinojosa	Susana Casares & Carolina Rivera	3 June 2018	0.67
Outraged by the farces of his father, Luis Miguel interrogates him about the whereabouts of his mother and demands that he return the 20 million dollars, which he stole. If not, Luis Miguel will be imprisoned, for not paying taxes.
8	8	"Alguien como tú" "Micky pierde su virginidad"	Humberto Hinojosa	Daniel Krauze	10 June 2018	0.66
Concerned about the change of voice of his son to his 13 years, Luis Rey hires a prostitute, so that Micky becomes a man. Luis Miguel is reunited with an old friend, Erika Camil.
9	9	"Todo el amor del mundo" "Luismi busca a su madre"	Humberto Hinojosa	Susana Casares	17 June 2018	0.62
Luis Miguel is affected, to discover that his mother was in a psychiatric, in the Canary Islands, by a strong depression and wants to know where he is. The farce of Luis Rey comes to light. Luis Miguel becomes increasingly frustrated because the reporters keep asking him questions about his father.
10	10	"Decídete" "Una pista de Marcela"	Humberto Hinojosa	Daniel Krauze	24 June 2018	0.74
With the help of the private investigator, Luis Miguel enters the psychiatric hospital, to confirm if the mysterious woman in the photograph is her mother. Luis Rey is on the verge of bankruptcy.
11	11	"Marcela" "Lo que marcó la vida de Luismi"	Humberto Hinojosa	Susana Casares & Daniel Krauze	1 July 2018	0.84
Marcela leaves Luis Rey and he forces Luis Miguel to choose who he prefers to live with. Luis Miguel dedicates the theme, "Marcela" to his mother and it is the last time he sees her and that she appears in public. Luis Miguel and Erika pursue a relationship.
12	12	"No me platiques más" "Micky gana su primer Grammy"	Humberto Hinojosa	Susana Casares & Daniel Krauze	8 July 2018	0.65
As one of the youngest in the industry, Luis Miguel at age fifteen, is recognized with this award from the US Academy of Arts and Sciences, for the song “Me gustas tal como eres”. The truth about Luis Miguel's birthplace comes out, forcing him to apologize to the public.
13	13	"No me puedes dejar así" "Luis Rey muere con su secreto"	Humberto Hinojosa	Daniel Krauze	15 July 2018	0.74
Luis Miguel begs his father, for the last time, to tell him where his mother is. Luis Rey takes the secret to his grave, but a new hopeful track emerges. Luismi recognizes his daughter.

=== Season 2 (2021) ===
No. overall	No. in season	Title	Directed by	Written by	Original release date
14	1	"Qué nivel de mujer"	Humberto Hinojosa	Daniel Krauze	18 April 2021
In 1992, Luis Miguel attends his father Luis Rey's funeral in Cádiz, Spain where Matilde, his paternal grandmother, refuses to grant Micky full custody of his younger brother Sergio and Micky warns her that he will not allow his uncle Tito to exploit Sergio like his own father did to him in the past. To ensure Sergio's safety, he and his brother Alex get him a flight to Mexico without telling Tito or Matilde. Micky finds out, through an Israeli agency, that the woman found near a bank is not actually Marcela, but instead María Carrasco, Micky's former neighbor who reveals that Tito bribed her into remaining quiet about the day Marcela was last seen and when she came to the house she heard screaming and Tito's clothes were covered in blood. Coerced into revealing Marcela's whereabouts, Tito tells Micky that she and his father had an argument which escalated into an accident Marcela suffered. Meanwhile, in 2005, a now adult Micky is giving presentations at the National Auditorium until in the middle of a concert he has accident that damages his hearing due to a problem in the audio equipment and he is quickly rushed to the hospital.
15	2	"Noche de paz"	Humberto Hinojosa	Ana Sofía Clerici and Daniel Krauze	18 April 2021
The aftermath of Micky's hearing accident causes him to plunge into an alcoholism spiral due to depression over cancelling all of his presentations for at least a year until he fully recovers. Even when he tries to record a song at the studio, Micky isn't able to keep himself on track because of his self-destructive behavior and a frequent beep in his infected ear, on account of the high volume that caused his earphone to explode. Back in 1992, shocked about Tito's confession, Micky tries at all costs to buy his father's house in Las Matas, Madrid, in order to make sure that Marcela is buried in said place, refusing to adhere to the investigator's unethical methods to proceed with the task. Micky's obsession with investigating the truth about his mother strains his relationships with Alex, Sergio and his girlfriend Erika, who leaves for New York after being ignored by him. After a conversation with Hugo and watching with Sergio a video of Luis Rey giving a serenade to Marcela, Micky finally decides to drop the investigation, instead dedicating the song "Hasta Que Me Olvides" in his mother's memory and visiting his daughter Michelle for the first time.
16	3	"Suave"	Humberto Hinojosa	Diego Ayala and Daniel Krauze	25 April 2021
Micky has been having a bad time due to misunderstandings he has with both Sergio and Alex, as are his attempts to reconnect with Michelle, whom he hasn't seen for eleven years. He also struggles with the decreasing stardom of his career while a new singer, Cris Valdés, whose song "No lo Harás" becomes a worldwide hit, arises. His new manager, Patricio Robles, urges Micky to go to Viña del Mar to regain the public's attention. Micky hires guitarist Kiko Cibrián as the producer of his upcoming album, Aries. After Alex accidentally crashes his car, Micky scolds him for his irresponsibility and they get into argument which ends with Alex deciding to stop living with his brothers, which angers Sergio. Meanwhile, Michelle, now 18-years-old, is eager to meet her father Micky, something that Sophie strongly opposes both because she wants nothing to do with him and they are about to move to Miami. After some thought, Michelle is finally allowed to see him. Although everything seems to go well, Michelle leaves in disgust while they are having dinner after Micky turns down her offer to live with him, choosing to buy her a house rather than sharing his. Mauricio, who is Micky's childhood friend and helped Michelle to get in touch with him, convinces her to give a relationship with her father a chance and let him try even if he messes up.
17	4	"Ayer"	Adrián Grünberg	Karin Valecillos	2 May 2021
Micky is still struggling to fix the broken relationship with his daughter Michelle. When she is about to leave for Miami, Michelle questions why he had abandoned her for eleven years, mostly believing it was her fault. Micky explains that he has been through very tough years and all he wanted to do was to take care of Michelle and protect her from him. He reconsiders her offer to live with him. Back in Michelle's youth, Micky is forced to bring her along during the filming of his song's "Ayer" music video while Sophie is out for some days. Michelle gets lost in the set looking for her father, but managed to be found by Hugo, after becoming distracted by a sexual encounter with her daughter's babysitter. Although Micky's career distances him from Michelle, Hugo puts the filming on hold in order for Micky to spend time with Michelle, which proves to be working, in spite of Sophie's doubts. Still struggling with the downfall of his career, Micky also dedicates some time with the production of his album "Aries" and the creation of a vineyard. Meanwhile, Micky's younger brother Sergio, who is on a camping trip, confides in Matilde about how lonely he feels because of Micky's demanding work, Alex's departure and his mother's mysterious disappearance; she promises to be closer to him. As Hugo's disease begins to show, Micky becomes concerned about his wellbeing and reaches out to him.
18	5	"Te extraño"	Adrián Günberg	Paulina Barros and Daniel Krauze	9 May 2021
Micky travels all the way to New York seeking the opportunity of making a duet with legendary singer Frank Sinatra, earning him a spot in the record production after showing his singing abilities with "Te extraño". During his staying in New York, Micky reunites with Erika and they spend the night together. However, Micky finds himself at crossroads after someone leaks to the press the would-be duet with Sinatra. The situation is eventually handled by Patricio, allowing the singer to record "Come Fly with Me" with Sinatra. Meanwhile, back in Mexico, a funeral is held for Hugo, who has died of colon cancer, with everyone in attendance, minus Erika, who is convinced by her roommate not to go, fearing that Micky will jump to the wrong conclusion about their relationship. Once again, Matilde makes it clear to Micky that she is Sergio's legal guardian, and he threatens to make her life miserable before ever staying near Sergio. Micky realizes from Azucena, his accountant, that he is being robbed.
19	6	"El día que me quieras"	Adrián Grünberg	Anton Goenechea	16 May 2021
Micky finds it difficult to write any new songs for his next album, still reeling from Hugo's death. After some disagreements with Kiko and producer Armando Manzanero, he encourages Micky to write a song that talks about how he really feels and the grief he is battling, inspiring him to include "El día que me quieras". Alex McCluskey, a member of Micky's teamwork, finds out that Patricio intends to become Micky's manager. He wants him fired, but Micky refuses to do so. Micky becomes angered at Erika, accusing her of abandoning him when he needed her the most after failing to attend Hugo's funeral. She apologizes to him, but he rejects her, causing Erika to walk out. However, Micky quickly regrets it and rushes to find Erika, reconciling with a passionate kiss. Michelle, who wanted to spend the holidays with her father, is upset to find out that he left all of a sudden without saying anything. Michelle initially reconsiders her decision of moving to Miami with her mother, but changes her mind after Micky explains to her that he wanted to be away from places that reminded him of his mother, who is also Michelle's grandmother. Giving her the necklace that Marcela once gave to him, Micky confesses to Michelle that she has become his Sun. Unless Micky agrees to meet her demands about Sergio's custody, Matilde privately blackmails him by threatening to expose every detail of his personal life to a journalist who is writing a book about him. Azucena informs Micky that his hearing accident came about because the required sound equipment was never bought and reveals the identity of the person responsible for the arrangement: his friend Mauricio Ambrosi. It is later revealed that José Pérez is the true culprit behind the scheme and he had framed Mauricio to cover his tracks.
20	7	"Entrégate"	Humberto Hinojosa	Ana Sofía Clerici & Daniel Krauze	23 May 2021
Micky confronts Mauricio and accuses him of stealing from him during the fateful concert at Perú, which almost cost him his hearing, but Mauricio insists he would never do something like that. Micky fires him nonetheless, bringing up his father's actions that led to their breakup. However, Micky talks to the owner of the forum, and realizes Mauricio's innocence. On account of that, the singer apologizes to his friend and ends up firing José, the true culprit. Michelle, who also doubted Mauricio's innocence in the incident, apologizes to him as well, ending with the two kissing. Meanwhile, Erika moves in with Micky and invites her parents over for dinner, though she feels disappointed when Micky shows up two hours late due to commitments with his career. Micky disassociates Alex from his team after seeking Italian singer Laura Pausini and firing Patricio without his consent. Micky later agrees to let Matilde watch Sergio so that she won't reveal any details about his personal life. She uses this as an opportunity to turn Sergio into a professional singer by signing him up for a singing contest in Spain. Micky finds out about this and tries to stop her by sending Patricio to make her sign a Warner Music contract that goes against her terms to control Sergio, which she rebuffs. In response, Matilde reneges on her promise and turns to Cynthia to tell her everything she knows about her grandson.
21	8	"Historia de un amor"	Humberto Hinojosa	Daniel Krauze	30 May 2021
In 2007, Micky makes his triumphant return to the stages while Mauricio decides to take some vacations. José, now fired, tries to seek a controversial story as revenge for his dismissal after his involvement in Micky's hearing accident was exposed. Mauricio and Michelle keep enjoying their affair, which nobody knows about. After dropping by at Azucena's office to pick up his contract settlement, José robs Mauricio's office where he finds the receipts for the plane tickets to Madrid for Mauricio and Michelle's trip. José manages to take some pictures of them kissing at their hotel entrance and shows them to a shocked Micky, though not before blackmailing the singer by threatening to make them public unless he stays quiet about the money stolen from him. Meanwhile, in 1994, Micky is still dating Erika who is auditioning for a film. Sergio is bullied at his school over Marcela's disappearance and subsequently harassed by journalists on his way out. Matilde arrives at Micky's home to pick Sergio up, where he and Alex make him choose who he wants to live with: Matilde or his brothers. He ends up choosing the former. Later on, Micky finally manages to give Matilde away to Sergio, revealing that she not only told everything to the press, but that she also has been sending him letters posing as Marcela, and shows them to him as solid evidence. Realizing her true nature, Sergio reneges on his previous choice and goes back to living with his brothers. However, their reunion is short-lived when Sergio is to leave for Boston in Doc's care in order to protect him from the press. Convinced by Sophie, Micky initially intends to reveal Michelle's existence to the world. However, Patricio manipulates him by saying that this could affect his career, even bringing up the fact that she could be harassed by journalists, just like they did to Sergio. As a result, Micky again denies Michelle's existence during an interview, much to Sophie's chagrin. A heartbroken Erika breaks up with Micky after seeing his interview in which he denied having a girlfriend and is shown with the interviewer, Daisy Fuentes, sharing flirtatious looks, which explains his two-hour absence at the dinner with her parents. Just as she leaves, it is revealed that Micky intended to propose to her.

=== Season 3 (2021) ===
No. overall	No. in season	Title	Directed by	Written by	Original release date
22	1	"Sueña"	Humberto Hinojosa	Giulia Cardamone & Daniel Krauze	October 28, 2021
In 1995, Micky attempts to woo Mariah Carey. Patricio takes financial risks. Years later, the singer struggles to overcome his demons.
23	2	"Cómo es posible que a mi lado"	Adrián Grünberg	Larissa Andrade & Giulia Cardamone & Karin Valecillos	October 28, 2021
Luis Miguel faces tough decisions amid a legal battle. In the past, Mauricio starts working for Micky just as Patricio handles a plagiarism claim.
24	3	"Por debajo de la mesa"	Humberto Hinojosa	Giulia Cardamone & Anton Goenechea & Daniel Krauze	October 28, 2021
Mauricio hopes to repair the relationship between Micky and his daughter. In the 90s, with Mariah's help, the singer is offered a chance to play Zorro.
25	4	"Sabor a mí"	Adrián Grünberg	Larissa Andrade & Giulia Cardamone	October 28, 2021
Amid personal struggles, Luis Miguel contemplates making a movie about his life. Years earlier, Micky's jealousy creates conflict with Mariah.
26	5	"Amante del amor"	Humberto Hinojosa	Giulia Cardamone & Anton Goenechea & Daniel Krauze	October 28, 2021
Mariah and Micky's relationship is on the rocks as they record a duet together. Decades later, Micky tells filmmakers anecdotes about his parents.
27	6	"La Bikina"	Adrián Grünberg	Giulia Cardamone & Daniel Krauze	October 28, 2021
After Patricio deceives him, Luis Miguel retaliates. Flashing forward, Micky prepares for a comeback concert and finally reaches out to his daughter.

== Awards and nominations ==
Year	Award	Category	Nominated	Result
2018	Fénix Awards	Best Series		Nominated
2018	Fénix Awards	Best Ensemble		Nominated
2018	Produ Awards	Director of Photography	Marc Bellver	Won
2018	Produ Awards	Best Actor in Miniseries or TV-Series	Óscar Jaenada	Won
2018	Produ Awards	Best Actor (Best digital strategy)	Diego Boneta	Won
2019	Spanish Actors Union	Best Actor in an International Production	Óscar Jaenada	Nominated
2019	Platino Awards	Best Actor in Miniseries or TV-Series	Diego Boneta	Nominated
2022	Actors and Actresses Union Awards	Best Actress in an International Production	Lola Casamayor	Nominated

== Music ==
Luis Miguel

Soundtrack album by Various artists
- Released: April 22, 2018
- Recorded: 2017–2018
- Label: Sony Music Entertainment

Singles from Luis Miguel
- 1. "Cuando Calienta el Sol" Released: April 20, 2018

The first soundtrack of the series, titled Luis Miguel La Serie Soundtrack, was released on 22 April 2018.

=== Track listing ===
No.	Title	Length
1.	"Ahora Te Puedes Marchar" (Diego Boneta)	3:12
2.	"Cuando Calienta el Sol" (Diego Boneta)	3:59
3.	"Fría Como el Viento" (Diego Boneta)	3:49
4.	"Un Hombre Busca Una Mujer" (Diego Boneta)	3:33
5.	"La Malagueña" (Izan Llunas)	4:08
6.	"Frente a una Copa de Vino" (Izan Llunas)	2:15
7.	"Culpable o No (Miénteme Como Siempre)" (Diego Boneta)	3:56
8.	"La Chica del Bikini Azul" (Diego Boneta)	3:00
9.	"Yo que no vivo sin ti" (Diego Boneta)	3:28
10.	"La Incondicional" (Diego Boneta)	4:20
11.	"1 + 1 = Dos Enamorados" (Izan Llunas)	3:33
12.	"Será que no me amas (Blame It On the Boogie)" (Diego Boneta)	4:08
13.	"Tengo Todo Excepto a Ti" (Diego Boneta)	4:35
14.	"Alguien Como Tú (Somebody In Your Life)" (Diego Boneta)	4:05
15.	"Palabra de honor" (Diego Boneta)	3:41
16.	"No Me Platiques Más" (Diego Boneta)	3:36
17.	"Mamá, Mamá" (Izan Llunas)	3:09
18.	"Decídete" (Izan Llunas)	3:05
19.	"No Me Puedes Dejar Así" (Izan Llunas)	3:30
20.	"Todo el Amor del Mundo" (Izan Llunas)	2:42
21.	"Marcela" (Izan Llunas)	2:51

The soundtrack of the series only contains 21 songs available on Spotify. There are some songs that are not shown in the album and are listed below:

- "Soy Como Quiero Ser" performed by Izan Llunas
- "Eres" performed by Izan Llunas

=== Charts ===
==== Weekly charts ====
Chart (2018)	Peak position
Mexican Albums (AMPROFON)	6

==== Year-end charts ====
Chart (2018)	Position
Mexican Albums (AMPROFON)	48

=== Certifications ===
Region	Certification	Certified units/sales
Mexico (AMPROFON)	Gold	30,000^{^}
^{^} Shipments figures based on certification alone.
