= Grandes Éxitos (Luis Miguel album) =

Greatest hits album by Luis Miguel
- Released: 22 November 2005
- Recorded: 1987–2005
- Genres: Pop; bolero; mariachi
- Length: 1:37:19
- Language: Spanish
- Label: Warner Music Latina
- Producer: Luis Miguel

Luis Miguel chronology
México en la Piel (2004)	Grandes Éxitos (2005)	Navidades (2006)

Luis Miguel video chronology
Mexico en la Piel: Edición Diamante (2005)	Grandes Éxitos Videos (2005)

Singles from Grandes Éxitos
- 1. "Misterios del Amor" Released: 24 October 2005; 2. "Si Te Perdiera" Released: 16 January 2006

Grandes Éxitos (English: "Greatest Hits") is a greatest hits album by Mexican singer Luis Miguel. Released on 22 November 2005 by Warner Music Latina, the album features 24 previously recorded songs from Miguel's career with his record label as well as two new songs ("Misterios del Amor" and "Si Te Perdiera"); both songs were released as singles from the album. A special edition of the record was also released and features six extra songs as well as a DVD containing music videos from Miguel's career. Grandes Éxitos received a favorable review by AllMusic critic, Thom Jurek who commended Miguel's trajectory as an artist. Commercially, it reached number one in Mexico and the top ten in Argentina, Spain, Portugal, and the Billboard Top Latin Albums chart in the United States. It was certified Multi-Platinum in Mexico and the United States (Latin) and Platinum in Spain.

== Background and content ==
On 15 October 2005, Luis Miguel announced that he was releasing a greatest hits album on 22 November 2005. The contains 24 previously recorded songs from his music career, ranging from pop music, boleros from his Romance series, and mariachi. The set includes tracks he recorded under his label Warner Music Latina since 1987. A special edition of the album was also released on 22 November and features six extra songs, as well as a DVD of his music videos.

Two original songs were composed for Grandes Éxitos: "Misterios del Amor" and "Si Te Perdiera". The former song was composed by Francisco Loyo and Alejandro Asensi while the latter track was written by Manuel Alejandro; both songs were produced by Miguel. "Misterios del Amor" was released as the album's lead single on 24 October 2005 and peaked at number 29 on the Billboard Hot Latin Songs chart in the United States. "Si Te Perdiera" was released as the album's second single on 16 January 2006 and peaked at number 47 on the Hot Latin Songs chart. "Si Te Perdiera" served as the main theme for the Mexican telenovela La verdad oculta (2006).

== Reception ==
AllMusic critic Thom Jurek gave Grandes Éxitos four-out-of-five stars noting Miguel's maturity from a teen idol into crooner. He commented some of the songs sounds "dated" but remarked that Miguel's trajectory as "utterly engaging and worthwhile". In the United States, Grandes Éxitos peaked at number eight on the Billboard Top Latin Albums chart and was certified double platinum in the Latin field by the Recording Industry Association of America for shipping 200,000 copies. In Mexico, the double-disc reached the top of the Top 100 Mexico albums chart and was certified quadruple platinum by the Asociación Mexicana de Productores de Fonogramas y Videogramas (AMPROFON) for shipping 400,000 units. The DVD was certified double platinum by AMPROFON as well for shipments of 40,000 units. In Argentina, it peaked at number three on the albums chart. In Europe, the record peaked at number five in Spain and was certified platinum by the Productores de Música de España and reached seven in Portugal.

== Track listing ==
Standard edition – Disc one
No.	Title	Writer(s)	Length
1.	"Ahora Te Puedes Marchar" (from Soy Como Quiero Ser, 1987)	Ivor Raymonde; Mike Hawker; Luis Gómez-Escolar	3:11
2.	"Cuando Calienta el Sol" (from Soy Como Quiero Ser, 1987)	Rafael Pérez; Carlos Rigual; Mario Rigual; Carlos Albert Martinoli	3:56
3.	"Fría Como el Viento" (from Busca una Mujer, 1988)	Juan Carlos Calderón	3:53
4.	"Un Hombre Busca una Mujer" (from Busca una Mujer, 1988)	Calderón; Gómez-Escolar	3:31
5.	"La Incondicional" (from Busca una Mujer, 1988)	Calderón	4:22
6.	"Entrégate" (from 20 Años, 1990)	Calderón	4:22
7.	"Tengo Todo Excepto a Ti" (from 20 Años, 1990)	Calderón	4:32
8.	"Inolvidable" (from Romance, 1991)	Julio Gutiérrez	4:15
9.	"No Sé Tú" (from Romance, 1991)	Armando Manzanero	3:48
10.	"América, América" (from América & en Vivo, 1992)	José Luis Armenteros; Pablo Herrero	4:34
11.	"Hasta Que Me Olvides" (from Aries, 1993)	Juan Luis Guerra	4:40
12.	"Suave" (from Aries, 1993)	Orlando Castro; Ignacio "Kiko" Cibrián	4:47
13.	"El Día Que Me Quieras" (from Segundo Romance, 1994)	Alfredo Le Pera; Carlos Gardel	3:58

Standard edition – Disc two
No.	Title	Writer(s)	Length
1.	"La Media Vuelta" (from Segundo Romance, 1994)	José Alfredo Jiménez	2:41
2.	"Si Nos Dejan" (from El Concierto, 1995)	Jiménez	2:34
3.	"Cómo Es Posible Que a Mi Lado" (from Nada Es Igual..., 1996)	Luis Miguel; Cibrián; Alejandro Asensi	4:13
4.	"Por Debajo de la Mesa" (from Romances, 1997)	Manzanero	3:03
5.	"Amor, Amor, Amor" (from Mis Romances, 2001)	Ricardo López Méndez; Gabriel Ruiz	3:41
6.	"O Tú o Ninguna" (from Amarte Es un Placer, 1999)	Calderón	3:16
7.	"Sol, Arena y Mar" (from Amarte Es un Placer, 1999)	Miguel; Francisco Loyo; Salo Loyo; Arturo Pérez	3:18
8.	"Te Necesito" (from 33, 2003)	Guerra	3:14
9.	"Vuelve" (from 33, 2003)	Asensi; Edgar Cortázar; Miguel; F. Loyo	3:33
10.	"La Bikina" (from Vivo, 2000)	Rubén Fuentes	2:57
11.	"Que Seas Feliz" (from México en la Piel, 2004)	Consuelo Velázquez	3:05
12.	"Misterios del Amor" (Previously unreleased)	F. Loyo; Asensi	3:58
13.	"Si Te Perdiera" (Previously unreleased)	Manuel Alejandro	3:59

Deluxe edition – Disc one
No.	Title	Writer(s)	Length
1.	"Ahora Te Puedes Marchar" (from Soy Como Quiero Ser, 1987)	Raymonde; Hawker; Gómez-Escolar	3:11
2.	"Cuando Calienta el Sol" (from Soy Como Quiero Ser, 1987)	Rafael Pérez; C. Rigual; M. Rigual; Martinoli	3:56
3.	"Fría Como el Viento" (from Busca una Mujer, 1988)	Calderón	3:53
4.	"Un Hombre Busca una Mujer" (from Busca una Mujer, 1988)	Calderón; Gómez-Escolar	3:31
5.	"La Incondicional" (from Busca una Mujer, 1988)	Calderón	4:22
6.	"Entrégate" (from 20 Años, 1990)	Calderón	4:22
7.	"Tengo Todo Excepto a Ti" (from 20 Años, 1990)	Calderón	4:32
8.	"Será Que No Me Amas" (from 20 Años, 1990)	Mick Jackson; Elmar Krohn; Calderón	4:06
9.	"Inolvidable" (from Romance, 1991)	Gutiérrez	4:15
10.	"No Sé Tú" (from Romance, 1991)	Manzanero	3:48
11.	"América, América" (from América & en Vivo, 1992)	Armenteros; Herrero	4:34
12.	"Hasta Que Me Olvides" (from Aries, 1993)	Guerra	4:40
13.	"Suave" (from Aries, 1993)	Castro; Cibrián	4:47
14.	"El Día Que Me Quieras" (from Segundo Romance, 1994)	Le Pera; Gardel	3:58
15.	"Somos Novios" (from Segundo Romance, 1994)	Manzanero	3:10
16.	"La Media Vuelta" (from Segundo Romance, 1994)	Jiménez	2:41
Total length:			63:48

Deluxe edition – Disc two
No.	Title	Writer(s)	Length
1.	"Si Nos Dejan" (from El Concierto, 1995)	Jiménez	2:34
2.	"Dame" (from Nada Es Igual..., 1996)	Alejandro Lerner; Cibrián	4:55
3.	"Cómo Es Posible Que a Mi Lado" (from Nada Es Igual..., 1996)	Luis Miguel; Cibrián; Alejandro Asensi	4:13
4.	"Por Debajo de la Mesa" (from Romances, 1997)	Manzanero	3:03
5.	"Amor, Amor, Amor" (from Mis Romances, 2001)	Méndez; Ruiz	3:41
6.	"O Tú o Ninguna" (from Amarte Es un Placer, 1999)	Calderón	3:16
7.	"Sol, Arena y Mar" (from Amarte Es un Placer, 1999)	Miguel; F. Loyo; S. Loyo; Pérez	3:18
8.	"Perfidia" (from Mis Romances, 2001)	Alberto Domínguez	3:22
9.	"Te Necesito" (from 33, 2003)	Guerra	3:14
10.	"Vuelve" (from 33, 2003)	Asensi; Cortázar; Miguel; F. Loyo	3:33
11.	"Y" (from Vivo, 2000)	Mario de Jesús Báez	2:42
12.	"La Bikina" (from Vivo, 2000)	Fuentes	2:57
13.	"Que Seas Feliz" (from México en la Piel, 2004)	Velázquez	3:05
14.	"Sabes una Cosa" (from México en la Piel, 2004)	Manuel Lozano; Fuentes	3:19
15.	"Misterios del Amor" (Previously unreleased)	F. Loyo; Asensi	3:58
16.	"Si Te Perdiera" (Previously unreleased)	Alejandro	3:59
Total length:			55:20

DVD – Disc one
No.	Title	Writer(s)	Length
1.	"Cuando Calienta el Sol" (from Soy Como Quiero Ser, 1987)	R. Pérez; C. Rigual; M. Rigual; Martinoli
2.	"Ahora Te Puedes Marchar" (from Soy Como Quiero Ser, 1987)	Raymonde; Hawker; Gómez-Escolar
3.	"La Incondicional" (from Busca una Mujer, 1988)	Calderón
4.	"Fría Como el Viento" (from Busca una Mujer, 1988)	Calderón
5.	"Tengo Todo Excepto a Ti" (from 20 Años, 1990)	Calderón
6.	"Entrégate" (from 20 Años, 1990)	Calderón
7.	"No Sé Tú" (from Romance, 1991)	Manzanero
8.	"Contigo en la Distancia" (from Romance, 1991)	César Portillo de la Luz
9.	"América, América" (from América & en Vivo, 1992)	Armenteros; Herrero
10.	"Suave" (from Aries, 1993)	Castro; Cibrián
11.	"Ayer" (from Aries, 1993)	David Foster; Jeremy Lubbock; Rudy Pérez
12.	"La Media Vuelta" (from Segundo Romance, 1994)	Jiménez
13.	"Delirio" (from Segundo Romance, 1994)	Portillo de la Luz

DVD – Disc two
No.	Title	Writer(s)	Length
1.	"El Día Que Me Quieras" (from Segundo Romance, 1994)	Le Pera; Gardel
2.	"Cómo Es Posible Que a Mi Lado" (from Nada Es Igual..., 1996)	Miguel; Cibrián; Asensi
3.	"Dame" (from Nada Es Igual..., 1996)	Lerner; Cibrián
4.	"Por Debajo de la Mesa" (from Romances, 1997)	Manzanero
5.	"Amarte Es un Placer" (from Amarte Es un Placer, 1999)	Calderón
6.	"O Tú o Ninguna" (from Amarte Es un Placer, 1999)	Calderón
7.	"La Bikina" (from Vivo, 2000)	Fuentes
8.	"Y" (from Vivo, 2000)	De Jesús Báez
9.	"Amor, Amor, Amor" (from Mis Romances, 2001)	Méndez; Ruiz
10.	"Te Necesito" (from 33, 2003)	Guerra
11.	"Que Seas Feliz" (from México en la Piel, 2004)	Velázquez
12.	"El Viajero" (from México en la Piel, 2004)	Roberto Sierra; José "Pepe" Martínez

== Charts ==
=== Weekly charts ===
Chart (2005)	Peak position
Argentina (CAPIF)	1
Mexico (Top 100 Mexico)	1
Portuguese Albums (AFP)	7
Spanish Albums (Promusicae)	5
US Top Latin Albums (Billboard)	8
US Latin Pop Albums (Billboard)	5

Chart (2023)	Peak position
US Latin Pop Albums (Billboard)	2

=== Year-end charts ===
Chart (2005)	Position
Argentina (CAPIF)	18
Mexico (Top 100 AMPROFON)	33
Spain (PROMUSICAE)	42

Chart (2006)	Position
Mexico (Top 100 AMPROFON)	28
US Top Latin Albums (Billboard)	45
US Latin Pop Albums (Billboard)	18

Chart (2018)	Position
Mexico (Top 100 AMPROFON)	7
US Top Latin Albums (Billboard)	36
US Latin Pop Albums (Billboard)	7

Chart (2019)	Position
Mexico (Top 100 AMPROFON)	17
US Top Latin Albums (Billboard)	55
US Latin Pop Albums (Billboard)	10

Chart (2020)	Position
US Latin Pop Albums (Billboard)	6

Chart (2021)	Position
US Top Latin Albums (Billboard)	60
US Latin Pop Albums (Billboard)	8

Chart (2022)	Position
US Latin Pop Albums (Billboard)	11

Chart (2023)	Position
US Top Latin Albums (Billboard)	58
US Latin Pop Albums (Billboard)	8

Chart (2024)	Position
US Top Latin Albums (Billboard)	82
US Latin Pop Albums (Billboard)	9

Chart (2025)	Position
US Latin Pop Albums (Billboard)	15

== Certifications ==
=== Album ===
Region	Certification	Certified units/sales
Argentina (CAPIF)	Platinum	40,000^{^}
Mexico (AMPROFON)	4× Platinum	395,000
Spain (Promusicae)	Platinum	80,000^{^}
United States (RIAA)	2× Platinum (Latin)	200,000^{^}
Summaries
Worldwide First-week sales	—	600,000
^{^} Shipments figures based on certification alone.

=== Video ===
Region	Certification	Certified units/sales
Argentina (CAPIF)	Platinum	8,000^{^}
Mexico (AMPROFON)	2× Platinum	40,000^{^}
^{^} Shipments figures based on certification alone.

== Personnel ==
Adapted from the Grandes Éxitos liner notes:

"Misterios del Amor"

- Luis Miguel – producer, vocals
- Rafa Sardina – recording engineer
- David Reitzas – audio mixing
- Ron McMaster – mastering

"Si Te Perdiera"

- Luis Miguel – producer, vocals
- Rafa Sardina – recording engineer, audio mixing
- Ron McMaster – mastering
