= Entrégate =

1990 single by Luis Miguel

Single by Luis Miguel

from the album 20 Años
- Released: September 3, 1990
- Recorded: 1989–1990; Sunset Sound Studios (Hollywood, California)
- Genre: Latin
- Length: 4:24
- Label: WEA Latina
- Songwriter: Juan Carlos Calderón
- Producer: Juan Carlos Calderón

Luis Miguel singles chronology
| "Tengo Todo Excepto a Tí" (1990) | "Entrégate" (1990) | "Será Que No Me Amas" (1990) |

"Entrégate" (English: "Surrender Yourself [To Me]") is a pop song written, produced and arranged by Juan Carlos Calderón, and performed by Mexican singer Luis Miguel. It was released as the second single from his Grammy Award nominated studio album 20 Años (1990), and became his fifth number-one single in the Billboard Top Latin Songs chart. The parent album became commercially successful, with sales records throughout Latin America and six of its singles entering the charts in Mexico simultaneously. After its release, Miguel was recognized as the leading male vocalist in Latin America.

An English-language version of the song, titled "Before the Dawn" was recorded, but as another track from the album 20 Años "Somebody in Your Life" penned by Diane Warren and originally performed by Peabo Bryson on his album Quiet Storm (1986), was released in the United Kingdom with mediocre results, Miguel decided not to record English versions of his songs again. A bootleg recording can be found on the video-sharing website YouTube, along with "Fría Como el Viento".

"Entrégate" was included in the track list for his 20 Años Tour in 1990, in a medley along "Yo Que No Vivo Sin Tí", "Culpable o No (Miénteme Como Siempre)", "Más Allá de Todo", "Fría Como el Viento", "Tengo Todo Excepto a Tí" and "La Incondicional" during his live performances in the National Auditorium in Mexico City. This performance was released on his album El Concierto (1995). In 2005, the song was included on the compilation album Grandes Éxitos. In 2021, Diego Boneta covered this song in the soundtrack of the second season of Luis Miguel: The Series.

== Chart performance ==
The song debuted in the Billboard Top Latin Songs chart (previously Hot Latin Tracks) at number 28 in the week of September 22, 1990, climbing to the top ten four weeks later, peaking at number-one on November 24, 1990, holding this position for one week, replacing "Completamente Enamorados" by Chayanne and being replaced by Lourdes Robles with "Abrázame Fuerte". The song became Miguel's fifth single to peak at the top in this chart, following "Ahora Te Puedes Marchar" (1987), "La Incondicional" and "Fría Como el Viento" (both 1989) and his preceding single "Tengo Todo Excepto a Ti". It ranked Number 28 on the Hot Latin Tracks year-end chart of 1991. The song also became a success in Ecuador and Mexico where it peaked at number-one. "Entrégate" has been covered by several performers, including César Flores, Grupo Villanhos, K-Paz de la Sierra, The Latin Stars Orchestra, Gerardo López and Los Students.

== Credits and personnel ==
This information adapted from 20 Años liner notes.

- Juan Carlos Calderón – production, songwriting, arranger
- Bennie Faccone – mixing
- John Robinson – drums, percussion
- Dennis Belfield – bass guitar
- Paul Jackson, Jr. – electric guitar
- Robbie Buchanan – piano

== Charts ==
=== Weekly charts ===
| Chart (1990–91) | Peak position |
|---|---|
| Mexico (AMPROFON) | 1 |
| US Hot Latin Songs (Billboard) | 1 |
