= Tengo Todo Excepto a Ti =

Single by Luis Miguel

from the album 20 Años
- Released: April 16, 1990
- Recorded: 1989–1990; Sunset Sound Studios (Hollywood, California)
- Genre: Latin pop
- Length: 4:32
- Label: WEA Latina
- Songwriter: Juan Carlos Calderón
- Producer: Juan Carlos Calderón

Luis Miguel singles chronology
"Culpable o No (Miénteme Como Siempre)" (1990)	"Tengo Todo Excepto a Ti" (1990)	"Entrégate" (1990)

"Tengo Todo Excepto a Ti" ("I Have Everything Except for You") is a song written, produced, and arranged by Juan Carlos Calderón, and performed by Mexican singer Luis Miguel. It was released as the lead single from his studio album 20 Años (1990). It reached the number one position all over Ibero-America, became his fourth number-one single in the Billboard Hot Latin Songs chart after "Ahora Te Puedes Marchar", "La Incondicional" and "Fría Como el Viento" and was nominated for Pop Song of the Year at the Lo Nuestro Awards. The parent album peaked at number two in the Latin Pop Albums chart and sold more than 600,000 copies in its first week of release.

The singer made the transition into adulthood with the album 20 Años, which reflected his age at the time of its release. "Tengo Todo Excepto a Ti" was included in the track list for his 20 Años Tour in 1990, also in a medley along "Yo Que No Vivo Sin Tí", "Culpable o No", "Más Allá de Todo", "Fría Como el Viento", "Entrégate" and "La Incondicional" during his live performances in the National Auditorium in México City. This performance was later released on his album El Concierto (1995). In 2005, the song was included on the compilation album Grandes Éxitos.

== Chart performance ==
The song debuted in the Billboard Hot Latin Songs chart (formerly Hot Latin Tracks) at number 33 in the week of June 2, 1990, climbing to the top ten two weeks later. "Tengo Todo Excepto a Ti" peaked at number-one on July 21, 1990, holding this position for eight consecutive weeks, replacing "El Cariño Es Como Una Flor" by Rudy La Scala and being replaced by José Feliciano with "¿Por Qué Te Tengo Que Olvidar?". "Tengo Todo Excepto a Ti" ranked second in the Billboard Year-End Chart of 1990, and became Luis Miguel's longest stay at number-one and his fourth single to peak at the top, following "Ahora Te Puedes Marchar" (1987), "La Incondicional" and "Fría Como el Viento" (both 1989). The single also peaked at number-one in Mexico.

== Music video ==
A video for the song was made in locations of Los Roques, Venezuela. It was directed and produced in 1990 by Henrique Lazo. The video was filmed on the beach with Luis Miguel alongside actress and former model Ruddy Rodríguez.

== Cover versions ==
"Tengo Todo Excepto a Ti" has been covered by several performers, including Aramis Camilo, Carlos Cuevas, Los Flamers, Darvel García, Kika y Raúl, Komboloko and Giovanni Vivanco. Mexican band La Posta also recorded a version of the track, which was used as the main theme for the telenovela of the same title, which was broadcast in México by TV Azteca. The song was also recorded by Mexican singer Edith Márquez and was included on her album ¿Quién Te Cantará? La Música de Juan Carlos Calderón, a 2003 tribute album produced by Calderón. Márquez was awarded with a Gold album certification in México for this album.

== Charts ==
=== Weekly charts ===
Chart (1990)	Peak position
Chile (UPI)	2
El Salvador (UPI)	8
Mexico (AMPROFON)	1
Puerto Rico (UPI)	9
US Hot Latin Songs (Billboard)	1

== See also ==
- List of number-one Billboard Hot Latin Tracks of 1990
