= México Por Siempre Tour =

2018–19 concert tour by Luis Miguel

- World tour by Luis Miguel
- Associated album: ¡México Por Siempre!
- Start date: 21 February 2018
- End date: 16 September 2019
- Legs: 4
- No. of shows: 128 in North America; 8 in Europe; 10 in South America; 4 in Central America; 150 total
- Attendance: 1,155,629 (127 shows); 1,360,029 (estimated from 147 shows)
- Box office: $115.15 million (127 shows); $134.15 million (estimated from 147 shows)

Luis Miguel concert chronology
- Deja Vu Tour (2014–15); México Por Siempre Tour (2018–19); Luis Miguel Tour 2023–24 (2023–24)

The México Por Siempre Tour was a concert tour by Mexican singer Luis Miguel in support of his 20th studio album ¡México Por Siempre!.

The tour totaled of 150 concerts throughout the United States, Canada, Latin America and Spain and was confirmed by Billboard as the tour of the year and the most successful Latin tour worldwide. Billboard Boxscore reported that the 2018 leg of Luis Miguel's México Por Siempre Tour run was the highest-grossing Latin tour since the chart launched in 1990, and earning the hitmaker a Latin American Music Award for tour of the year. He also broke his own record performing 35 concerts in a tour at the National Auditorium in Mexico City, grossing $28.3 million from 332,867 sold seats, surpassing the 30 shows he completed with the México En La Piel Tour in 2006.

According to Pollstar, the tour grossed $115,151,674 and was attended by 1,155,629 spectators in 127 shows reported. With an estimation from 147 concerts of $134,151,674 and 1,360,029 attendance.

== History ==
The tour started in the National Auditorium of Mexico City with 5 shows.

== Awards and nominations ==
Year	Organization	Award	Result	Ref.
2018	Latin American Music Award	Favorite Tour	Won	
2019	Billboard Latin Music Awards	Tour of the Year	Won	
2019	Latin American Music Award	Favorite Tour	Won	
2019	Premio Lo Nuestro	Tour of the Year	Nominated	
2019	30th Annual Pollstar Awards	Best Latin Tour	Nominated	
2020	31st Annual Pollstar Awards	Best Latin Tour	Nominated	

== Tour set list ==
México Por Siempre Tour: (18 shows) Feb/21/2018 - Mar/26/2018

México Por Siempre Tour : (18 shows) Feb/21/2018 – Mar/26/2018
No.	Title	Original album	Length
1.	"Intro / Si Te Vas"	Nada Es Igual
2.	"Tú Solo Tú"	Amarte Es Un Placer
3.	"Amor, Amor, Amor"	Mis Romances
4.	"Tres Palabras (Until 2 March)"	Luis Miguel
5.	"Devuélveme El Amor ("Ahora Que Te Vas" only in the first concert)"	33
6.	"Medley" (Por Debajo De La Mesa / No Se Tú)	Romances, Romance
7.	"Medley" (Un Hombre Busca a Una Mujer / Cuestión De Piel / Oro De Ley)	Busca Una Mujer, 20 Años
8.	"Esa Niña"	Busca Una Mujer
9.	"Medley" (Amante del Amor / Más Allá de Todo / Fría Como el Viento / Tengo Todo Excepto a Ti / Entregate)	20 Años, Busca Una Mujer
10.	"Medley" (Hoy El Aire Huele A Ti / Siento / Más / Sintiendote Lejos)	20 Años, Luis Miguel, Nada Es Igual
11.	"Todo Por Su Amor"	Nada Es Igual
12.	"Hasta Que Me Olvides"	Aries
13.	"Te Necesito"	33
14.	"Tú y Yo / Repise"	Aries
15.	"La Barca"	Romance
16.	"La Mentira"	Romance
17.	"Contigo En La Distancia"	Romance
18.	"La Gloria Eres Tú (Sometimes)"	Romances
19.	"Intro (México Por Siempre) / La Fiesta Del Mariachi"	¡México Por Siempre!
20.	"Soy Lo Prohibido"	¡México Por Siempre!
21.	"Serenata Huasteca"	¡México Por Siempre!
22.	"No Discutamos"	¡México Por Siempre!
23.	"El Siete Mares"	¡México Por Siempre!
24.	"¿Por Qué Te Conocí?"	¡México Por Siempre!
25.	"Llamarada"	¡México Por Siempre!
26.	"Intro (Huapango) / El Balajú"	¡México Por Siempre!
27.	"Intro (Drop Drape) / Mujer De Fuego"	Luis Miguel
28.	"Medley" (No Me Puedes Dejar Así / Palabra De Honor / La Incondicional)	Decídete, Palabra De Honor, Busca Una Mujer
29.	"Medley" (Separados / 1 + 1 = 2 Enamorados / Directo al Corazón)	Busca Una Mujer, Un sol, Directo al corazón
30.	"Suave (First 2 Concerts)"	Aries
31.	"Medley" (Decídete / Muchachos De Hoy / Ahora Te Puedes Marchar / La Chica Del Bikini Azul / Isabel / Cuando Calienta El Sol)	Decídete, Palabra De Honor, Fiebre De Amor, Soy Como Quiero Ser
32.	"Cucurrucucú Paloma (Rarely)"

México Por Siempre Tour: (11 shows) Apr/10/2018 - Apr/28/2018

México Por Siempre Tour : (11 shows) Apr/10/2018 – Apr/28/2018
No.	Title	Original album	Length
1.	"Intro / Si Te Vas"	Nada Es Igual
2.	"Tú Solo Tú"	Amarte Es Un Placer
3.	"Amor, Amor, Amor"	Mis Romances
4.	"Devuélveme El Amor"	33
5.	"Medley" (Por Debajo De La Mesa / No Se Tú)	Romances, Romance
6.	"Medley" (Un Hombre Busca a Una Mujer / Cuestión De Piel / Oro De Ley)	Busca Una Mujer, 20 Años
7.	"Esa Niña"	Busca Una Mujer
8.	"Medley" (Amante del Amor / Más Allá de Todo / Fría Como el Viento / Tengo Todo Excepto a Ti / Entregate)	20 Años, Busca Una Mujer
9.	"Medley" (Hoy El Aire Huele A Ti / Siento / Más / Sintiendote Lejos)	20 Años, Luis Miguel, Nada Es Igual
10.	"Todo Por Su Amor (Until 12 April)"	Nada Es Igual
11.	"Hasta Que Me Olvides"	Aries
12.	"Medley (24 to 28 April)" (No Me Puedes Dejar Así / Palabra De Honor / La Incondicional)	Decídete, Palabra De Honor, Busca Una Mujer
13.	"Te Necesito"	33
14.	"Tú y Yo / Repise"	Aries
15.	"La Barca"	Romance
16.	"La Mentira"	Romance
17.	"Contigo En La Distancia"	Romance
18.	"Intro (México Por Siempre) / La Fiesta Del Mariachi"	¡México Por Siempre!
19.	"Llamarada"	¡México Por Siempre!
20.	"Intro (Huapango) / El Balajú"	¡México Por Siempre!
21.	"La Bikina"	Vivo
22.	"Sabes Una Cosa"	México En La Piel
23.	"Serenata Huasteca (Sometimes)"	¡México Por Siempre!
24.	"El Siete Mares (Sometimes)"	¡México Por Siempre!
25.	"Soy Lo Prohibido (Sometimes)"	¡México Por Siempre!
26.	"No Discutamos (Sometimes)"	¡México Por Siempre!
27.	"El Viajero (Sometimes)"	México En La Piel
28.	"Amanecí Entre Tus Brazos"	El Concierto
29.	"México En La Piel (Sometimes)"	México En La Piel
30.	"Si Nos Dejan (Sometimes)"	El Concierto
31.	"De Que Manera Te Olvido (Sometimes)"	México En La Piel
32.	"Mi Ciudad (Sometimes)"	México En La Piel
33.	"Suave (Sometimes)"	Aries
34.	"Medley" (Decídete / Muchachos De Hoy / Ahora Te Puedes Marchar / La Chica Del Bikini Azul / Isabel / Cuando Calienta El Sol)	Decídete, Palabra De Honor, Fiebre De Amor, Soy Como Quiero Ser

México Por Siempre Tour: (18 shows) May/04/2018 - Jun/09/2018

México Por Siempre Tour : (18 shows) May/04/2018 – Jun/09/2018
No.	Title	Original album	Length
1.	"Intro / Si Te Vas"	Nada Es Igual
2.	"Tú Solo Tú"	Amarte Es Un Placer
3.	"Amor, Amor, Amor"	Mis Romances
4.	"Devuélveme El Amor"	33
5.	"Medley" (Por Debajo De La Mesa / No Se Tú)	Romances, Romance
6.	"Medley" (Un Hombre Busca a Una Mujer / Cuestión De Piel / Oro De Ley)	Busca Una Mujer, 20 Años
7.	"Esa Niña (Until 16 May)"	Busca Una Mujer
8.	"Culpable o No (Since 19 May)"	Busca Una Mujer
9.	"Medley" (Amante del Amor / Más Allá de Todo / Fría Como el Viento / Tengo Todo Excepto a Ti / Entregate)	20 Años, Busca Una Mujer
10.	"Medley (Until 10 May)" (Hoy El Aire Huele A Ti / Siento / Más / Sintiendote Lejos)	20 Años, Luis Miguel, Nada Es Igual
11.	"Hasta Que Me Olvides"	Aries
12.	"Come Fly With Me (Only in Los Angeles)"	Duets II
13.	"Medley" (No Me Puedes Dejar Así / Palabra De Honor / La Incondicional)	Decídete, Palabra De Honor, Busca Una Mujer
14.	"Te Necesito"	33
15.	"Tú y Yo / Repise"	Aries
16.	"La Barca"	Romance
17.	"La Mentira"	Romance
18.	"Contigo En La Distancia"	Romance
19.	"Intro (México Por Siempre) / La Fiesta Del Mariachi"	¡México Por Siempre!
20.	"Llamarada"	¡México Por Siempre!
21.	"Intro (Huapango) / El Balajú"	¡México Por Siempre!
22.	"La Bikina"	Vivo
23.	"Sabes Una Cosa"	México En La Piel
24.	"No Discutamos (Sometimes)"	¡México Por Siempre!
25.	"Si Nos Dejan (Sometimes)"	El Concierto
26.	"De Que Manera Te Olvido (Sometimes)"	México En La Piel
27.	"Amanecí Entre Tus Brazos (Sometimes)"	El Concierto
28.	"Serenata Huasteca (Sometimes)"	¡México Por Siempre!
29.	"Mi Ciudad (Sometimes)"	México En La Piel
30.	"Suave (Sometimes)"	Aries
31.	"Medley" (Decídete / Muchachos De Hoy / Ahora Te Puedes Marchar / La Chica Del Bikini Azul / Isabel / Cuando Calienta El Sol)	Decídete, Palabra De Honor, Fiebre De Amor, Soy Como Quiero Ser

México Por Siempre Tour: (8 shows) July/01/2018 - July/14/2018

México Por Siempre Tour : (8 shows) July/01/2018 – July/14/2018
No.	Title	Original album	Length
1.	"Intro / Si Te Vas"	Nada Es Igual
2.	"Tú Solo Tú"	Amarte Es Un Placer
3.	"Amor, Amor, Amor"	Mis Romances
4.	"Devuélveme El Amor"	33
5.	"Medley" (Por Debajo De La Mesa / No Se Tú)	Romances, Romance
6.	"Medley" (Un Hombre Busca a Una Mujer / Cuestión De Piel / Oro De Ley)	Busca Una Mujer, 20 Años
7.	"Culpable o No"	Busca Una Mujer
8.	"Medley" (Amante del Amor / Más Allá de Todo / Fría Como el Viento / Tengo Todo Excepto a Ti / Entregate)	20 Años, Busca Una Mujer
9.	"La Barca"	Romance
10.	"El Reloj"	Romances
11.	"Hasta Que Me Olvides"	Aries
12.	"Medley" (No Me Puedes Dejar Así / Palabra De Honor / La Incondicional)	Decídete, Palabra De Honor, Busca Una Mujer
13.	"Te Necesito"	33
14.	"Tú y Yo / Repise"	Aries
15.	"La Mentira"	Romance
16.	"Contigo En La Distancia"	Romance
17.	"Intro (México Por Siempre) / La Fiesta Del Mariachi"	¡México Por Siempre!
18.	"Llamarada"	¡México Por Siempre!
19.	"Intro (Huapango) / El Balajú"	¡México Por Siempre!
20.	"La Bikina"	Vivo
21.	"Sabes Una Cosa"	México En La Piel
22.	"Échame A Mi La Culpa"	México En La Piel
23.	"Si Nos Dejan"	El Concierto
24.	"No Discutamos (Sometimes)"	¡México Por Siempre!
25.	"Soy Lo Prohibido (Only in Madrid)"	¡México Por Siempre!
26.	"Serenata Huasteca"	¡México Por Siempre!
27.	"De Qué Manera Te Olvido (Only Cap Roig Festival)"	México En La Piel
28.	"Medley" (Decídete / Muchachos De Hoy / Ahora Te Puedes Marchar / La Chica Del Bikini Azul / Isabel / Cuando Calienta El Sol)	Decídete, Palabra De Honor, Fiebre De Amor, Soy Como Quiero Ser

México Por Siempre Tour: (11 shows) Aug/30/2018 – Sep/16/2018

México Por Siempre Tour : (11 shows) August/30/2018 – September/16/2018
No.	Title	Original album	Length
1.	"Intro / Si Te Vas"	Nada Es Igual
2.	"Tú Solo Tú"	Amarte Es Un Placer
3.	"Amor, Amor, Amor"	Mis Romances
4.	"Devuélveme El Amor"	33
5.	"Medley" (Por Debajo De La Mesa / No Se Tú)	Romances, Romance
6.	"Medley" (Un Hombre Busca a Una Mujer / Cuestión De Piel / Oro De Ley)	Busca Una Mujer, 20 Años
7.	"Culpable o No"	Busca Una Mujer
8.	"Medley" (Amante del Amor / Más Allá de Todo / Fría Como el Viento / Tengo Todo Excepto a Ti / Entregate)	20 Años, Busca Una Mujer
9.	"Hasta Que Me Olvides"	Aries
10.	"Medley" (No Me Puedes Dejar Así / Palabra De Honor / La Incondicional)	Decídete, Palabra De Honor, Busca Una Mujer
11.	"Lo Que Queda De Mí (Only in San Antonio)"	Luis Miguel
12.	"Historia De Un Amor (Only in San Antonio)"	Segundo Romance
13.	"Te Necesito"	33
14.	"Tú y Yo / Repise (Excluded in Las Vegas)"	Aries
15.	"La Barca"	Romance
16.	"La Mentira"	Romance
17.	"Contigo En La Distancia"	Romance
18.	"Interlude Son De La Negra (Only in Las Vegas & Inglewood)"
19.	"Intro (México Por Siempre) / La Fiesta Del Mariachi"	¡México Por Siempre!
20.	"Llamarada"	¡México Por Siempre!
21.	"Intro (Huapango) / El Balajú"	¡México Por Siempre!
22.	"La Bikina"	Vivo
23.	"Sabes Una Cosa"	México En La Piel
24.	"Medley (Only in Las Vegas & Inglewood)" (Cielito Lindo / Que Bonita Es Mi Tierra / Viva México, Viva América)
25.	"De Que Manera Te Olvido (Sometimes)"	México En La Piel
26.	"Échame A Mi La Culpa (Sometimes)"	México En La Piel
27.	"Serenata Huasteca (Sometimes)"	¡México Por Siempre!
28.	"Si Nos Dejan (Sometimes)"	El Concierto
29.	"México En La Piel (Sometimes)"	México En La Piel
30.	"Suave (Sometimes)"	Aries
31.	"Medley" (Decídete / Muchachos De Hoy / Ahora Te Puedes Marchar / La Chica Del Bikini Azul / Isabel / Cuando Calienta El Sol)	Decídete, Palabra De Honor, Fiebre De Amor, Soy Como Quiero Ser

México Por Siempre Tour: (40 shows) Sep/25/2018 – Dec/18/2018

México Por Siempre Tour : (40 shows) September/25/2018 – December/18/2018
No.	Title	Original album	Length
1.	"Intro / Si Te Vas"	Nada Es Igual
2.	"Tú Solo Tú"	Amarte Es Un Placer
3.	"Amor, Amor, Amor"	Mis Romances
4.	"Devuélveme El Amor"	33
5.	"Medley" (Por Debajo De La Mesa / No Se Tú)	Romances, Romance
6.	"Medley" (Un Hombre Busca a Una Mujer / Cuestión De Piel / Oro De Ley)	Busca Una Mujer, 20 Años
7.	"Culpable o No"	Busca Una Mujer
8.	"Te Necesito"	33
9.	"Medley" (Amante del Amor / Más Allá de Todo / Fría Como el Viento / Tengo Todo Excepto a Ti / Entregate)	20 Años, Busca Una Mujer
10.	"Hasta Que Me Olvides"	Aries
11.	"Medley" (No Me Puedes Dejar Así / Palabra De Honor / La Incondicional)	Decídete, Palabra De Honor, Busca Una Mujer
12.	"Tú y Yo / Repise"	Aries
13.	"La Barca (Excluded 3 Oct to 7 Oct)"	Romance
14.	"La Mentira (Excluded 3 Oct to 7 Oct)"	Romance
15.	"Contigo En La Distancia (Excluded 3 Oct to 7 Oct)"	Romance
16.	"Interlude (Son De La Negra)"
17.	"Intro (México Por Siempre) / La Fiesta Del Mariachi"	¡México Por Siempre!
18.	"Llamarada"	¡México Por Siempre!
19.	"Intro (Huapango) / El Balajú"	¡México Por Siempre!
20.	"La Bikina"	Vivo
21.	"Sabes Una Cosa"	México En La Piel
22.	"Échame A Mi La Culpa (Sometimes)"	México En La Piel
23.	"Serenata Huasteca (Sometimes)"	¡México Por Siempre!
24.	"De Que Manera Te Olvido (Sometimes)"	México En La Piel
25.	"Amanecí Entre Tus Brazos (Sometimes)"	El Concierto
26.	"Si Nos Dejan (Sometimes)"	El Concierto
27.	"La Media Vuelta (Only 12 December)"	Segundo Romance
28.	"No Discutamos (Sometimes)"	¡México Por Siempre!
29.	"México En La Piel (Sometimes)"	México En La Piel
30.	"Mi Ciudad (Sometimes)"	México En La Piel
31.	"Interlude"
32.	"Suave (Sometimes) (Until 12 November)"	Aries
33.	"Será Que No Me Amas (Since 13 November)"	20 Años
34.	"Santa Claus Llegó A La Ciudad (Only 6 and 12 December)"	Navidades
35.	"Medley" (Decídete / Muchachos De Hoy / Ahora Te Puedes Marchar / La Chica Del Bikini Azul / Isabel / Cuando Calienta El Sol)	Decídete, Palabra De Honor, Fiebre De Amor, Soy Como Quiero Ser

México Por Siempre Tour: (16 shows) Feb/19/2019 – Mar/31/2019

Luis Miguel Tour : (16 shows) February/19/2019 – March/31/2019
No.	Title	Original album	Length
1.	"Intro / Si Te Vas"	Nada Es Igual
2.	"Tú Solo Tú"	Amarte Es Un Placer
3.	"Amor, Amor, Amor"	Mis Romances
4.	"Devuélveme El Amor"	33
5.	"Suave"	Aries
6.	"Medley" (Por Debajo De La Mesa / No Se Tú)	Romances, Romance
7.	"Medley" (Un Hombre Busca a Una Mujer / Cuestión De Piel / Oro De Ley)	Busca Una Mujer, 20 Años
8.	"Culpable o No"	Busca Una Mujer
9.	"Te Necesito"	33
10.	"Medley" (Amante del Amor / Más Allá de Todo / Fría Como el Viento / Tengo Todo Excepto a Ti / Entregate)	20 Años, Busca Una Mujer
11.	"Hasta Que Me Olvides"	Aries
12.	"O Tú O Ninguna (Excluded 19 February)"	Amarte Es Un Placer
13.	"Medley" (No Me Puedes Dejar Así / Palabra De Honor / La Incondicional)	Decídete, Palabra De Honor, Busca Una Mujer
14.	"Medley" (Separados / 1 + 1 = 2 Enamorados / Directo al Corazón)	Busca Una Mujer, Un sol, Directo al corazón
15.	"Tú y Yo / Repise"	Aries
16.	"La Barca"	Romance
17.	"La Mentira"	Romance
18.	"Contigo En La Distancia"	Romance
19.	"Historia De Un Amor (Excluded 19 February)"	Segundo Romance
20.	"Interlude / Será Que No Me Amas"	20 Años
21.	"Medley" (Decídete / Muchachos De Hoy / Ahora Te Puedes Marchar / La Chica Del Bikini Azul / Isabel / Cuando Calienta El Sol)	Decídete, Palabra De Honor, Fiebre De Amor, Soy Como Quiero Ser
22.	"Medley (Sometimes)" (Vuelve / Eres / Como Es Posible Que A Mi Lado / Te Propongo Esta Noche)	33, Nada Es Igual, Amarte Es Un Placer

México Por Siempre Tour: (18 shows) Jun/1/2019 – July/6/2019

Luis Miguel Tour : (18 shows) June/1/2019 – July/6/2019
No.	Title	Original album	Length
1.	"Intro / Si Te Vas"	Nada Es Igual
2.	"Tú Solo Tú"	Amarte Es Un Placer
3.	"Amor, Amor, Amor"	Mis Romances
4.	"Devuélveme El Amor"	33
5.	"Suave"	Aries
6.	"Medley" (Por Debajo De La Mesa / No Se Tú)	Romances, Romance
7.	"Medley" (Un Hombre Busca a Una Mujer / Cuestión De Piel / Oro De Ley)	Busca Una Mujer, 20 Años
8.	"Culpable o No"	Busca Una Mujer
9.	"Te Necesito"	33
10.	"Medley" (Amante del Amor / Más Allá de Todo / Fría Como el Viento / Tengo Todo Excepto a Ti / Entregate)	20 Años, Busca Una Mujer
11.	"Hasta Que Me Olvides"	Aries
12.	"Medley" (No Me Puedes Dejar Así / Palabra De Honor / La Incondicional)	Decídete, Palabra De Honor, Busca Una Mujer
13.	"Tú y Yo / Repise"	Aries
14.	"La Barca"	Romance
15.	"La Mentira (First 3 Concerts)"	Romance
16.	"Contigo En La Distancia"	Romance
17.	"Intro (México Por Siempre) / La Fiesta Del Mariachi"	¡México Por Siempre!
18.	"Llamarada"	¡México Por Siempre!
19.	"Intro (Huapango) / El Balajú"	¡México Por Siempre!
20.	"La Bikina"	Vivo
21.	"Sabes Una Cosa"	México En La Piel
22.	"Échame A Mi La Culpa (Until 18 June)"	México En La Piel
23.	"De Que Manera Te Olvido"	México En La Piel
24.	"Serenata Huasteca (Sometimes)"	¡México Por Siempre!
25.	"No Discutamos (First 2 Concerts)"	¡México Por Siempre!
26.	"Amanecí Entre Tus Brazos (Only Phoenix)"	El Concierto
27.	"Mi Ciudad (Only Newark)"	México En La Piel
28.	"México En La Piel"	México En La Piel
29.	"Interlude / Será Que No Me Amas (Until 18 June)"	20 Años
30.	"Medley" (Decídete / Muchachos De Hoy / Ahora Te Puedes Marchar / La Chica Del Bikini Azul / Isabel / Cuando Calienta El Sol)	Decídete, Palabra De Honor, Fiebre De Amor, Soy Como Quiero Ser

México Por Siempre Tour: (4 shows) Sep/12/2019 – Sep/16/2019

Luis Miguel Tour : (4 shows) September/12/2019 – September/16/2019
No.	Title	Original album	Length
1.	"Intro / Si Te Vas"	Nada Es Igual
2.	"Tú Solo Tú"	Amarte Es Un Placer
3.	"Amor, Amor, Amor"	Mis Romances
4.	"Devuélveme El Amor"	33
5.	"Suave"	Aries
6.	"Medley" (Por Debajo De La Mesa / No Se Tú)	Romances, Romance
7.	"Medley" (Un Hombre Busca a Una Mujer / Cuestión De Piel / Oro De Ley)	Busca Una Mujer, 20 Años
8.	"Culpable o No"	Busca Una Mujer
9.	"Te Necesito"	33
10.	"Medley" (Amante del Amor / Más Allá de Todo / Fría Como el Viento / Tengo Todo Excepto a Ti / Entregate)	20 Años, Busca Una Mujer
11.	"Hasta Que Me Olvides"	Aries
12.	"Medley" (No Me Puedes Dejar Así / Palabra De Honor / La Incondicional)	Decídete, Palabra De Honor, Busca Una Mujer
13.	"Tú y Yo / Repise"	Aries
14.	"La Barca"	Romance
15.	"Contigo En La Distancia"	Romance
16.	"Interlude (Son De La Negra)"
17.	"Intro (México Por Siempre) / La Fiesta Del Mariachi"	¡México Por Siempre!
18.	"Llamarada"	¡México Por Siempre!
19.	"Intro (Huapango) / El Balajú"	¡México Por Siempre!
20.	"La Bikina"	Vivo
21.	"Sabes Una Cosa"	México En La Piel
22.	"De Que Manera Te Olvido"	México En La Piel
23.	"México En La Piel"	México En La Piel
24.	"Échame A Mi La Culpa"	México En La Piel
25.	"Si Nos Dejan"	El Concierto
26.	"El Viajero"	México En La Piel
27.	"Medley (Only in the second concert)" (Cielito Lindo / Que Bonita Es Mi Tierra / Viva México, Viva América)
28.	"Interlude / Medley" (Decídete / Muchachos De Hoy / Ahora Te Puedes Marchar / La Chica Del Bikini Azul / Isabel / Cuando Calienta El Sol)	Decídete, Palabra De Honor, Fiebre De Amor, Soy Como Quiero Ser

== Tour dates ==
List of concerts, showing date, city, country, venue, tickets sold, number of available tickets and amount of gross revenue
Date	City	Country	Venue	Attendance	Revenue
North America – Leg 1
21 February 2018	Mexico City	Mexico	National Auditorium	75,933 / 75,933 (Note: The score data is combined from the shows held at the National Auditorium from 21-23 Feb., 27-28 and 6–8 March 2018, respectively.)	$6,768,372
22 February 2018	Mexico City	Mexico	National Auditorium	75,933 / 75,933	$6,768,372
23 February 2018	Mexico City	Mexico	National Auditorium	75,933 / 75,933	$6,768,372
27 February 2018	Mexico City	Mexico	National Auditorium	75,933 / 75,933	$6,768,372
28 February 2018	Mexico City	Mexico	National Auditorium	75,933 / 75,933	$6,768,372
2 March 2018	Puebla	Mexico	Acrópolis	7,371 / 7,371	$805,369
3 March 2018	Querétaro	Mexico	Club Hípico de Juriquilla	8,551 / 8,743	$824,242
6 March 2018	Mexico City	Mexico	National Auditorium	—	—
7 March 2018	Mexico City	Mexico	National Auditorium	—	—
8 March 2018	Mexico City	Mexico	National Auditorium	—	—
10 March 2018	San Luis Potosí	Mexico	El Domo	6,134 / 7,643	$744,437
14 March 2018	Monterrey	Mexico	Auditorio Citibanamex	12,590 / 12,590	$1,648,574
15 March 2018	Monterrey	Mexico	Auditorio Citibanamex	12,590 / 12,590	$1,648,574
17 March 2018	Guadalajara	Mexico	Telmex Auditorium	31,801 / 31,801	$3,345,772
18 March 2018	Guadalajara	Mexico	Telmex Auditorium	31,801 / 31,801	$3,345,772
21 March 2018	Guadalajara	Mexico	Telmex Auditorium	31,801 / 31,801	$3,345,772
22 March 2018	Guadalajara	Mexico	Telmex Auditorium	31,801 / 31,801	$3,345,772
26 March 2018 (Note: The 26 March 2018 concert at Explanada María Bonita in Acapulco was originally scheduled to take place on 24 March 2018 at Expo Mundo Imperial, but was cancelled in the middle of the show and postponed due to "sound technical problems".)	Acapulco	Mexico	Explanada María Bonita	8,630 / 10,278	$814,786
10 April 2018 (Note: Private dinner show for 700 people.)	Monterrey	Mexico	Auditorio Citibanamex	—	—
12 April 2018	Monterrey	Mexico	Auditorio Citibanamex	11,626 / 12,590	$1,560,517
13 April 2018	Monterrey	Mexico	Auditorio Citibanamex	11,626 / 12,590	$1,560,517
15 April 2018	Mexico City	Mexico	National Auditorium	67,340 / 67,340 (Note: The score data is combined from the shows held at the National Auditorium from 15–16 April, 18 and 24–25 April, 27-28, 2018, respectively.)	$6,128,068
16 April 2018	Mexico City	Mexico	National Auditorium	67,340 / 67,340	$6,128,068
18 April 2018	Mexico City	Mexico	National Auditorium	67,340 / 67,340	$6,128,068
20 April 2018	León	Mexico	Velaria de la Feria de León	8,805 / 8,807	$983,113
24 April 2018	Mexico City	Mexico	National Auditorium	—	—
25 April 2018	Mexico City	Mexico	National Auditorium	—	—
27 April 2018	Mexico City	Mexico	National Auditorium	—	—
28 April 2018	Mexico City	Mexico	National Auditorium	—	—
4 May 2018	Chula Vista	United States	Mattress Firm Amphitheatre	16,011 / 16,011	$1,344,742
6 May 2018	Los Angeles	United States	Hollywood Bowl	16,549 / 16,549	$1,901,217
10 May 2018	San José	United States	SAP Center	10,775 / 10,775	$1,179,925
11 May 2018	Sacramento	United States	Golden 1 Center	9,466 / 9,466	$1,032,303
13 May 2018	Phoenix	United States	Comerica Theatre	4,779 / 4,779	$654,117
16 May 2018	Tucson	United States	AVA Amphitheater	4,556 / 4,556	$466,175
19 May 2018	Salt Lake City	United States	USANA Amphitheatre	6,735 / 6,735	$398,749
20 May 2018	Denver	United States	Pepsi Center	7,519 / 8,714	$787,158
23 May 2018	Rosemont	United States	Allstate Arena	12,242 / 12,242	$1,485,289
25 May 2018	Dallas	United States	American Airlines Center	12,544 / 12,544	$1,401,707
26 May 2018	Laredo	United States	Laredo Energy Arena	8,179 / 8,179	$1,100,582
27 May 2018	Houston	United States	Toyota Center	11,690 / 11,690	$1,483,509
30 May 2018	Orlando	United States	Amway Center	5,536 / 5,923	$703,650
1 June 2018	Miami	United States	American Airlines Arena	14,098 / 14,098	$2,250,075
2 June 2018	Miami	United States	American Airlines Arena	14,098 / 14,098	$2,250,075
5 June 2018	National Harbor	United States	The Theater at MGM National Harbor	2,631 / 2,631	$533,751
7 June 2018	Toronto	Canada	Budweiser Stage	5,695 / 8,517	$471,410
8 June 2018	Montreal	Canada	Bell Centre	7,224 / 9,669	$580,659
9 June 2018	New York City	United States	Madison Square Garden	12,815 / 12,815	$2,086,145
Europe
1 July 2018	Madrid	Spain	WiZink Center	21,919	$2,080,219
2 July 2018	Madrid	Spain	WiZink Center	21,919	$2,080,219
5 July 2018	Seville	Spain	Estadio de La Cartuja	—	—
7 July 2018	Murcia	Spain	Estadio Nueva Condomina	—	—
8 July 2018	Barcelona	Spain	Palau Sant Jordi	—	—
11 July 2018	Marbella	Spain	Starlite Festival	—	—
13 July 2018	Palafrugell	Spain	Cap Roig Festival	—	—
14 July 2018	Valencia	Spain	Auditorio Marina Sur	—	—
North America – Leg 2
30 August 2018	San Antonio	United States	AT&T Center	12,319 / 12,319	$1,432,921
31 August 2018	Edinburg	United States	Bert Ogden Arena	7,749 / 7,749	$1,204,303
2 September 2018	El Paso	United States	Don Haskins Center	6,748 / 6,748	$1,087,388
4 September 2018	Albuquerque	United States	Sandia Casino Amphitheater	4,195	$328,650
7 September 2018	Rancho Mirage	United States	The Show at Agua Caliente Casino	1,405	$281,425
8 September 2018	Anaheim	United States	Honda Center	11,538 / 11,538	$1,489,706
9 September 2018	Fresno	United States	Save Mart Center	6,594	$571,905
11 September 2018	Santa Barbara	United States	Santa Barbara Bowl	—	—
13 September 2018	Las Vegas	United States	The Colosseum at Caesars Palace	—	—
14 September 2018	Las Vegas	United States	The Colosseum at Caesars Palace	—	—
16 September 2018	Inglewood	United States	The Forum	12,417 / 12,417	$1,319,014
25 September 2018	Querétaro	Mexico	Club Hípico de Juriquilla	8,919 / 8,931	$971,401
27 September 2018	Guadalajara	Mexico	Telmex Auditorium	24,012 / 24,076	$2,657,656
29 September 2018	Guadalajara	Mexico	Telmex Auditorium	24,012 / 24,076	$2,657,656
30 September 2018	Guadalajara	Mexico	Telmex Auditorium	24,012 / 24,076	$2,657,656
2 October 2018	Mexico City	Mexico	National Auditorium	57,192 / 57,219 (Note: The score data is combined from the shows held at the National Auditorium from 2–4 October and 9–11 October 2018, respectively.)	$5,163,245
3 October 2018	Mexico City	Mexico	National Auditorium	57,192 / 57,219	$5,163,245
4 October 2018	Mexico City	Mexico	National Auditorium	57,192 / 57,219	$5,163,245
7 October 2018	Toluca	Mexico	Estadio de Béisbol Toluca 80	4,652	$383,335
9 October 2018	Mexico City	Mexico	National Auditorium	—	—
10 October 2018	Mexico City	Mexico	National Auditorium	—	—
11 October 2018	Mexico City	Mexico	National Auditorium	—	—
13 October 2018	Torreón	Mexico	Feria de Torreón	15,921 / 16,228	$1,460,942
14 October 2018	Torreón	Mexico	Feria de Torreón	15,921 / 16,228	$1,460,942
16 October 2018	Culiacán	Mexico	Foro Tecate	7,710 / 7,712	$866,128
20 October 2018	Ensenada	Mexico	Foro Santo Tomás	9,274	$1,276,205
21 October 2018	Mexicali	Mexico	La Isla de Las Estrellas	7,367	$877,205
24 October 2018	Veracruz	Mexico	Estadio Universitario Beto Ávila	18,927 (Note: The score data is combined from the shows from 24 and 28 October 2018, respectively.)	$1,868,612
26 October 2018	Mérida	Mexico	Coliseo Yucatán	12,265	$1,606,463
27 October 2018	Mérida	Mexico	Coliseo Yucatán	12,265	$1,606,463
28 October 2018	Cancún	Mexico	Estadio de Béisbol Beto Ávila		
10 November 2018 (Note: The 10 November 2018 concert at Estadio de Beisbol Francisco Villa in Morelia was originally scheduled to take place on 6 October 2018, but was postponed due to "weather problems".)	Morelia	Mexico	Estadio de Beisbol Francisco Villa	9,071	$819,005
12 November 2018	Mexico City	Mexico	National Auditorium	131,684 / 131,684 (Note: The score data is combined from the shows held at the National Auditorium from 12-20 Nov., 27-29 and 6–10 Dec. 2018, respectively.)	$10,664,760
13 November 2018	Mexico City	Mexico	National Auditorium	131,684 / 131,684	$10,664,760
14 November 2018	Mexico City	Mexico	National Auditorium	131,684 / 131,684	$10,664,760
16 November 2018	Mexico City	Mexico	National Auditorium	131,684 / 131,684	$10,664,760
17 November 2018	Mexico City	Mexico	National Auditorium	131,684 / 131,684	$10,664,760
19 November 2018	Mexico City	Mexico	National Auditorium	131,684 / 131,684	$10,664,760
20 November 2018	Mexico City	Mexico	National Auditorium	131,684 / 131,684	$10,664,760
22 November 2018	Guadalajara	Mexico	Telmex Auditorium	8,043	$795,622
24 November 2018	Aguascalientes	Mexico	Estadio Alberto Romo Chávez	9,943	$885,388
27 November 2018	Mexico City	Mexico	National Auditorium	—	—
28 November 2018	Mexico City	Mexico	National Auditorium	—	—
29 November 2018	Mexico City	Mexico	National Auditorium	—	—
2 December 2018	Villahermosa	Mexico	Estadio Centenario 27 de Febrero	8,451	$800,536
4 December 2018	Puebla	Mexico	Acrópolis	7,601	$772,513
6 December 2018	Mexico City	Mexico	National Auditorium	—	—
7 December 2018	Mexico City	Mexico	National Auditorium	—	—
8 December 2018	Mexico City	Mexico	National Auditorium	—	—
10 December 2018	Mexico City	Mexico	National Auditorium	—	—
12 December 2018	Monterrey	Mexico	Auditorio Citibanamex	25,120 / 25,120	$3,015,807
13 December 2018	Monterrey	Mexico	Auditorio Citibanamex	25,120 / 25,120	$3,015,807
14 December 2018	Monterrey	Mexico	Auditorio Citibanamex	25,120 / 25,120	$3,015,807
16 December 2018	Monterrey	Mexico	Auditorio Citibanamex	25,120 / 25,120	$3,015,807
18 December 2018 (Note: The 18 December 2018 concert at Expo Forum in Hermosillo was originally scheduled to take place on 18 October 2018, but was postponed due to "Production delays".)	Hermosillo	Mexico	Expo Forum	6,218	$561,521
Latin America – Leg 3		Mexico			
19 February 2019	Santiago	Chile	Movistar Arena	43,421	$4,951,051
20 February 2019	Santiago	Chile	Movistar Arena	43,421	$4,951,051
22 February 2019	Santiago	Chile	Movistar Arena	43,421	$4,951,051
23 February 2019	Santiago	Chile	Movistar Arena	43,421	$4,951,051
26 February 2019	Córdoba	Argentina	Orfeo Superdomo	9,777 / 9,777	$1,074,864
1 March 2019	Buenos Aires	Argentina	Campo Argentino de Polo	85,746	$5,431,743
2 March 2019	Buenos Aires	Argentina	Campo Argentino de Polo	85,746	$5,431,743
7 March 2019	Asunción	Paraguay	Hipódromo de Asunción	—	—
10 March 2019	Lima	Peru	Jockey Club	—	—
16 March 2019	Bogotá	Colombia	Estadio El Campín	24,404 / 26,000	$2,106,687
19 March 2019	Panama City	Panama	Amador Convention Center	—	—
21 March 2019	San José	Costa Rica	Estadio Nacional de Costa Rica	—	—
24 March 2019	San Salvador	El Salvador	Estadio Jorge "Mágico" González	—	—
26 March 2019	Guatemala City	Guatemala	Explanada Cardales de Cayalá	—	—
29 March 2019	Santo Domingo	Dominican Republic	Estadio Olímpico Félix Sánchez	16,036	$1,163,029
31 March 2019	San Juan	Puerto Rico	José Miguel Agrelot Coliseum	12,121	$1,086,315
North America – Leg 4
1 June 2019	Phoenix	United States	Talking Stick Resort Arena	7,034	$594,784
4 June 2019	Oklahoma City	United States	Chesapeake Energy Arena	3,851	$356,926
6 June 2019	Kansas City	United States	Sprint Center	—	—
8 June 2019	Saint Paul	United States	Xcel Energy Center	4,840	$403,790
9 June 2019	Rosemont	United States	Allstate Arena	8,351	$861,814
12 June 2019	Uniondale	United States	Nassau Coliseum	3,084	$413,398
14 June 2019	Newark	United States	Prudential Center	5,389	$636,313
15 June 2019	Boston	United States	TD Garden	5,714	$504,319
18 June 2019	Raleigh	United States	PNC Arena	—	—
19 June 2019	Duluth	United States	Infinite Energy Center	7,055 / 8,669	$664,131
22 June 2019	Sunrise	United States	BB&T Center	7,127	$789,979
23 June 2019	Miami	United States	American Airlines Arena	6,724	$828,512
25 June 2019	Tampa	United States	Amalie Arena	5,380	$507,099
27 June 2019	Houston	United States	Toyota Center	10,394	$1,055,902
29 June 2019	Corpus Christi	United States	American Bank Center	—	—
30 June 2019	Edinburg	United States	Bert Ogden Arena	—	—
2 July 2019	Laredo	United States	Sames Auto Arena	—	—
5 July 2019	Lubbock	United States	United Supermarkets Arena	—	—
6 July 2019	El Paso	United States	Don Haskins Center	—	—
12 September 2019	Las Vegas	United States	The Colosseum at Caesars Palace	7,026 / 8,177	$1,642,965
13 September 2019	Las Vegas	United States	The Colosseum at Caesars Palace	7,026 / 8,177	$1,642,965
15 September 2019	Las Vegas	United States	The Colosseum at Caesars Palace	8,137 / 8,137	$1,973,109
16 September 2019	Las Vegas	United States	The Colosseum at Caesars Palace	8,137 / 8,137	$1,973,109
150 Concerts	79 Cities	15 Countries	80 Venues	1,155,629	$115,151,674

== Cancelled shows ==
List of cancelled concerts, showing date, city, country, venue, and reason for cancellation
Date	City	Country	Venue	Reason
25 November 2018	Irapuato	Mexico	Explanada de Inforum Irapuato	Production Delays
13 March 2019	Guayaquil	Ecuador	Estadio Modelo	Heavy Rains

== Band ==
- Musical Director & guitar: Kiko Cibrian
- Bass: Lalo Carrillo
- Piano & Keyboards: Mike Rodriguez
- Keyboards & Programming: Salo Loyo
- Grand Piano: Ismael Alderete
- Drums: Victor Loyo
- Saxophone: Greg Vail
- Trumpet: Ramón Flores
- Trombone: Alejandro Carballo
- Backing vocals: Paula Peralta, Mollie Gould, Anna Berenyi (2018), Lauren Lutostanski (2019)
- Mariachi: Vargas de Tecalitlán

== See also ==
- List of highest-grossing concert tours by Latin artists
- List of most-attended ticketed multi-night concerts
