= Culpable o No (Miénteme Como Siempre) =

1989 single by Luis Miguel

Single by Luis Miguel

from the album Busca una Mujer
- Language: Spanish
- Released: 1990
- Genre: Latin pop
- Length: 3:56
- Label: Warner Music
- Songwriter: Juan Carlos Calderón
- Producer: Juan Carlos Calderón

Luis Miguel singles chronology
"Yo Que No Vivo Sin Ti" (1988)	"Culpable o No (Miénteme Como Siempre)" (1989)	"Cuando Calienta el Sol" (1988)

"Culpable o No (Miénteme Como Siempre)" (English: "Guilty or Not (Lie to Me Like Always)"), also simply known as "Culpable o No", is a song by Mexican singer Luis Miguel. Written and produced by Juan Carlos Calderón, it was released as the fifth single from Miguel's sixth studio album, Busca una Mujer.

The song debuted at number 28 on the Billboard Hot Latin Songs chart in 1990, peaking at number 22 in its second week during a four-week chart run. It debuted at number 10 on the Notitas Musicales chart, provided by Radio Mil, and eventually peaked at number 1 for two consecutive weeks.

== Promotion ==
"Culpable o No" was released as the fifth single from Busca una Mujer in 1989 via Warner Music Latina, and became Miguel's fourth top-five single from the album on the Notitas Musicales chart. The song was included as the ninth track on the setlist for the Busca una Mujer tour. The song has become a staple in Miguel's subsequent tours, appearing in the 20 Años Tour and Romance Tour as a full track, and in other tours thereafter as part of a medley.

== Charts ==
Chart performance for "Culpable o No (Miénteme Como Siempre)"
Chart (1989–1990)	Peak position
Mexico (Notitas Musicales)	1
US Hot Latin Songs (Billboard)	22

Chart (2018)	Peak position
Mexico Streaming (AMPROFON)	6
