= Luis Miguel: 20 Años =

Luis Miguel: 20 Años Gira 20 Años

Video by Luis Miguel
- Released: 1991
- Recorded: 1991
- Genre: Latin pop
- Length: 100:00
- Label: Warner Music Vision

Luis Miguel chronology
Un Año De Conciertos (1989)	Luis Miguel: 20 Años; Gira 20 Años (1991)	Romance: En Vivo (1992)

Luis Miguel: 20 Años (also known as Gira 20 Años or Premier 1991) is a VHS Video from the Mexican singer Luis Miguel. It was recorded in 1991 during the presentations of the artist with the Gira 20 Años by various places in Mexico after the release of his last album (at that time) 20 Años.

This tour is considered to be the first grand tour by Luis Miguel, with presentations in all Mexico, and in various cities of the United States.

This video records a presentation of the artist in the now destroyed Centro de Espectaculos Premier (Premier Shows Center). The video contains around 90 minutes of the concerts, and the other 10 minutes include an interview that Luis Miguel made specially for the video. In this video Luis Miguel sang his pop songs, but the special feature of this video is that Luis Miguel sang 2 songs in Italian, and also 10 minutes of never-released songs in Trio (guitar).

== Song list ==
1. Introduction
2. Oro de Ley
3. Yo Que No Vivo Sin Ti
4. Amante del Amor
5. Pupilas de Gato
6. Culpable O No
7. Hoy El Aire Huele a Tí
8. Más Allá de Todo
9. Ahora Te Puedes Marchar
10. Il Cielo (in Italian) (never released)
11. Álguien Como Tú
12. Entrégate
13. Fría Como el Viento
14. Stragna Gelozzia (in Italian) (never released)
15. Tengo Todo Excepto a Tí
16. Será Que No Me Amas
17. Trios Medley
  - Un Poco Más (never released)
  - Llévatela (never released)
  - El Reloj (never released)
  - Sabor A Mí (never released)
  - Contigo Aprendi (never released)
18. De Que Manera Te Olvido (never released)
19. Como Fue (never released)
20. Un Hombre Busca Una Mujer
21. La Incondicional
22. Cuando Calienta El Sol
