= ¡México Por Siempre! =

Studio album by Luis Miguel
- Released: 24 November 2017
- Studio: United Recording; Westlake Recording Studios (Hollywood, CA)
- Genre: Mariachi; ranchera
- Length: 42:08
- Language: Spanish
- Label: Warner Music Mexico
- Producer: Luis Miguel

Luis Miguel chronology
| Luis Miguel (2010) | ¡México Por Siempre! (2017) |

Singles from ¡México por siempre!
- 1. "La Fiesta del Mariachi" Released: 27 October 2017; 2. "Llamarada" Released: 17 November 2017

¡México Por Siempre! (Spanish for: 'Mexico Forever'; stylized as ¡MÉXICO Por Siempre!) is the 20th studio album by Mexican singer Luis Miguel. Released on 24 November 2017 via Warner Music Mexico, it is his second full-length mariachi album following México en la Piel (2004). The album was produced solely by Luis Miguel, with instrumentation done by mariachi ensemble Vargas de Tecalitlán.

The album was a commercial success, being certified three times platinum by the Asociación Mexicana de Productores de Fonogramas y Videogramas (AMPROFON) and peaking in the top ten on record charts in Mexico, Argentina and Spain. It won two Latin Grammy Awards for Album of the Year and Best Ranchero/Mariachi Album, and won the Grammy Award for Best Regional Mexican Music Album.

== Promotion ==
To promote ¡México por siempre!, Luis Miguel began his México Por Siempre Tour on 21 February 2018 at the National Auditorium in Mexico City. The tour totaled 150 concerts throughout the United States, Canada, Latin America and Spain and was confirmed by Billboard as the tour of the year and the most successful Latin tour worldwide.

Boxscore reported that the 2018 leg of Luis Miguel's México Por Siempre Tour was the highest-grossing Latin tour since the chart launched in 1990, pulling in $64.9 million from 613,000 tickets sold, and earning Luis Miguel a Latin American Music Award for tour of the year. He also broke his own record, performing 35 concerts in a tour at the National Auditorium in Mexico City, surpassing the 30 shows he did with the México En La Piel Tour in 2006.

== Track listing ==
| No. | Title | Writer(s) | Length |
|---|---|---|---|
| 1. | "La Fiesta del Mariachi" | José Martínez Barajas | 2:44 |
| 2. | "No Me Amenaces" | José Alfredo Jiménez | 2:39 |
| 3. | "Llamarada" | Jorge Villamil | 3:35 |
| 4. | "El Balajú / Huapango" | Pedro Galindo Galarza; Ernesto Cortázar; José Pablo Moncayo | 2:49 |
| 5. | "Soy Lo Prohibido" | Roberto Cantoral; Francisco Dino Ramos | 3:05 |
| 6. | "El Siete Mares" | Jiménez | 2:39 |
| 7. | "¿Por Qué Te Conocí?" | Juan Bruno Tarraza | 3:23 |
| 8. | "Deja Que Salga la Luna" | Jiménez | 3:23 |
| 9. | "Serenata Huasteca" | Jiménez | 2:55 |
| 10. | "Que Te Vaya Bonito" | Jiménez | 2:42 |
| 11. | "No Discutamos" | Juan Gabriel | 3:22 |
| 12. | "Sin Sangre en las Venas" | Rubén Fuentes; Montes | 2:40 |
| 13. | "Que Bonita Es Mi Tierra" | Fuentes; Montes | 2:53 |
| 14. | "Los Días Felices (Les jours heureux)" | Charles Aznavour | 3:49 |
| Total length: | | | 42:08 |

== Personnel ==
Adapted from the ¡México Por Siempre! liner notes:

=== Performance credits ===
Mariachi Vargas De Tecalitlán

- Carlos Martínez – director, first violin
- Alberto Alfaro – violin
- Miguel Ángel Barrón "Gigio" – violin
- Andrés González – violin
- Arturo Vargas – guitar
- Enrique de Santiago – guitarrón
- Gilberto Aguirre – vihuela
- Gustavo Alvarado – trumpet
- Jorge Aguayo – trumpet
- Eduardo Serna – trumpet

Additional musicians

- Armando Arellano – violin
- Sergio Caratache – violin
- Simón Casas – violin
- Fernando Martínez – violin
- Pepe Martínez Jr. – violin
- Julio Serna – violin
- Luke Maurer – viola
- Michael Whitson – viola
- Rodney Wirtz – viola
- Alwyn Wright – viola
- Vanessa Freebairn-Smith – cello
- Alisha Bauer – cello
- Giovanna Clayton – cello
- Trevor Handy – cello
- Chris Bleth – oboe
- Heather Clark – flute
- Stephen Kujala – flute
- James Thatcher – french horn
- Jenny Kim – french horn
- Guillermo Acuña – harp (tracks 1, 3–4, 6, 8–9, 12–13)
- Ramón Stagnaro – acoustic guitar (tracks 2, 7, 10)
- David Reitzas – percussion (tracks 1–3, 5, 7–8, 10–14)

Chorus (tracks 1, 4, 6, 9, 13)

- Alberto Alfaro
- Israel Bustos
- Simón Casas
- Andrés González
- Carlos Martínez
- Pepe Martínez Jr.
- Jonathan Palomar
- Arturo Vargas

=== Technical credits ===
- Luis Miguel – producer
- David Reitzas – co-producer, engineer, mixer, mastering engineer
- Carlos Martínez – musical direction
- Shari Sutcliffe – production coordinator
- Jess Sutcliffe – orchestra recording
- Jeremy Simoneaux – recording assistant and mixing
- Wesley Seidman – recording assistant
- Monique Evelyn – recording assistant
- Greg Eliason – recording assistant
- Eric Boulanger – mastering engineer
- Omar Cruz – photography
- Stephanie Hsu – graphic design
- Ravali Yan – photography pages 10 & 11

== Charts ==
=== Weekly charts ===
| Chart (2017) | Peak position |
|---|---|
| Argentinian Albums (CAPIF) | 2 |
| Mexican Albums (AMPROFON) | 1 |
| Spanish Albums (PROMUSICAE) | 6 |
| US Billboard 200 | 184 |
| US Regional Mexican Albums (Billboard) | 1 |
| US Top Latin Albums (Billboard) | 2 |

=== Year-end charts ===
| Chart (2017) | Position |
|---|---|
| Mexican Albums (AMPROFON) | 2 |
| Spanish Albums (PROMUSICAE) | 75 |
| Chart (2018) | Position |
| Mexican Albums (AMPROFON) | 2 |
| Spanish Albums (PROMUSICAE) | 65 |
| US Regional Mexican Albums (Billboard) | 15 |
| US Top Latin Albums (Billboard) | 44 |
| Chart (2019) | Position |
| Mexican Albums (AMPROFON) | 50 |

== Certifications ==
| Region | Certification | Certified units/sales |
|---|---|---|
| Mexico (AMPROFON) | 3× Platinum | 180,000^{‡} |
| United States (RIAA) | Gold (Latin) | 30,000^{‡} |
^{‡} Sales+streaming figures based on certification alone.

== See also ==
- 2017 in Latin music
- List of number-one albums of 2017 (Mexico)
- List of number-one albums of 2018 (Mexico)
