= Gimnasio Universitario UACJ =

Arena in Chihuahua, Mexico

Gimnasio Universitario UACJ is a 4,347-seat indoor arena located in Ciudad Juárez, Chihuahua, Mexico. It was built in 1985 and is home to the Universidad Autónoma de Ciudad Juárez basketball and volleyball teams.

Most of the fixed seating is at the upper level, 3,003 in all, with the remaining 1,344 in the lower level. In addition to sports —lucha libre, boxing and other sporting events have been held here – the Gimnasio has also been used for graduation ceremonies, political rallies, religious crusades and concerts, although in recent years other venues, including Estadio Cohen and the Nova Luna nightclub, both in El Paso, Texas, are becoming preferred stops for concerts by Mexican recording acts. Its maximum concert capacity is 6,000. Gloria Trevi, Alicia Villarreal, Pedro Fernández, Lupita D'Alessio, and Pepe Aguilar, among others, have performed here.
