= 20 Años (Luis Miguel album) =

- Cover to the standard edition of the album

Studio album by Luis Miguel
- Released: May 18, 1990
- Recorded: 1989–1990
- Studios: Sunset Sound Studios (Hollywood, CA)
- Genre: Latin pop
- Length: 39:55
- Language: Spanish
- Label: WEA Latina
- Producer: Juan Carlos Calderón

Luis Miguel chronology
Busca una Mujer (1988)	20 Años (1990)	Romance (1991)

Singles from 20 años
- 1. "Tengo Todo Excepto a Ti" Released: 1990; 2. "Entrégate" Released: 1990; 3. "Amante del amor" Released: 1990; 4. "Hoy el aire huele a ti" Released: 1991; 5. "Más allá de todo" Released: 1991; 6. "Será que no me amas" Released: 1991

Professional ratings
Review scores
Source	Rating
Allmusic	4/5 stars

20 Años (transl. 20 Years) is the seventh studio album recorded by Mexican singer Luis Miguel, It was released by WEA Latina on May 18, 1990. The album was produced by Spanish singer-songwriter, composer and record producer Juan Carlos Calderón, who had worked on the two previous albums by Luis Miguel, and was a massive success across Latin-America, Spain, and with Hispanic listeners in the United States. A large majority of the tracks from the album received radio airplay, but the songs officially issued as singles were "Tengo Todo Excepto A Tí", "Entrégate", "Amante del amor", "Hoy el aire huele a ti", "Más allá de todo" and "Será que no me amas".

In 1991, it received a nomination for Best Latin Pop Performance at the 33rd Grammy Awards, becoming Luis Miguel's third Grammy nomination. At the 3rd Lo Nuestro Awards, the album was nominated for Pop Album of the Year.

This album was the album that confirmed the success that Luis Miguel had reached with his last album Busca Una Mujer. In Mexico, it broke the record for the most copies sold in a single weekend (600,000 units).

"Será que no me amas" had an "official choreography" that remains popular in Latin America to date. The album's second song, Oro de ley has become known among fans of professional wrestling for being the entrance theme of Japanese joshi wrestler Akira Hokuto.

== Promotion ==
To promote the album, Luis Miguel began his 20 Años Tour on 12 July 1990 in Mexico City. On this tour he performed several shows at Mexico's Centro de Espectáculos Premier. These concerts were recorded and later released as a VHS video called Luis Miguel: 20 Años.

== Track listing ==
All tracks are written by Juan Carlos Calderón, except where noted.

No.	Title	Writer(s)	Length
1.	"Entrégate"		4:22
2.	"Oro de Ley"	Calderón; L. Gómez-Escolar	4:04
3.	"Tengo Todo Excepto a Ti"		4:31
4.	"Será que no me Amas (Blame It on the Boogie)"	M. George Jackson-Clarck; D. John Jackson Rich; E. Krohn; Calderón (Adaptation)	4:03
5.	"Amante del amor"		3:19
6.	"Hoy el Aire Huele a Ti"		3:35
7.	"Cuestión de Piel"	Calderón; Escolar	4:24
8.	"Más Allá de Todo"		4:10
9.	"Alguien Como Tú (Somebody In Your Life)"	D. Warren; R. Buchanan; Luis Ángel Márquez (Adaptation)	4:17
10.	"Más"		3:10
Total length:			39:55

== Personnel ==
Adapted from the 20 Años liner notes:

=== Performance credits ===
- John Robinson – drums, percussion
- Dennis Belfield – bass
- Neil Stubenhaus – bass
- Paul Jackson Jr. – electric guitar
- Oscar Castro-Neves – acoustic guitar
- Robbie Buchanan – piano, synthesizers
- Juan Carlos Calderón – piano, synthesizers
- Gina Kronstadt String Section – strings
- Jerry Hey Brass Section – brass
- Herb Alpert – trumpet solo (track 6)
- Dan Higgins – saxophone solo
- Martika – chorus
- Darlene Koldenhoven – chorus
- Marlene Landin – chorus
- K. C. Porter – chorus
- Jose Pezullo – chorus
- Dan Navarro – chorus
- Clydene Jackson – chorus

=== Technical credits ===
- Juan Carlos Calderón – producer, arrangements
- Robbie Buchanan – arrangements
- Jerry Hey – brass arrangements
- Philip Cacayorin – computer programming
- Ivy Skoff – general coordination
- Carlos Somonte – photography
- José Quintana – production coordination
- Bernie Grundman – mastering
- Benny Faccone – recording engineer, mixer engineer
- Mike Kloster – recording assistant
- Brad Gilderman – mixer (tracks 4, 7, 9)

== Charts ==
=== Weekly charts ===
Weekly chart performance for 20 Años
Chart (1990–94)	Peak position
Argentine Albums (CAPIF)	8
US Top Latin Albums (Billboard)	46
US Latin Pop Albums (Billboard)	2

Chart (2003)	Peak position
Spanish Albums (PROMUSICAE)	92

=== Year-end charts ===
Year-end chart performance for 20 Años
Chart (1990)	Position
US Latin Pop Albums (Billboard)	11

Chart (1991)	Position
US Latin Pop Albums (Billboard)	15

== Certifications and sales ==
Region	Certification	Certified units/sales
Argentina (CAPIF)	5× Platinum	300,000^{^}
Chile	—	117,000
Mexico (AMPROFON)	2× Platinum+5× Gold	1,000,000
Spain (Promusicae)	3× Platinum	300,000^{^}
United States	—	200,000
Venezuela	Gold	
Summaries
Worldwide	—	2,000,000
^{^} Shipments figures based on certification alone.

== See also ==
- List of best-selling albums in Argentina
- List of best-selling albums in Mexico
- List of best-selling Latin albums
