= Ahora Te Puedes Marchar =

1987 single by Luis Miguel

Single by Luis Miguel

from the album Soy Como Quiero Ser
- Language: Spanish
- B-side: "Sunny"
- Released: June 8, 1987
- Genre: Latin pop
- Length: 3:15
- Label: Warner Music Latina
- Songwriters: Ivor Raymonde; Luis Gómez-Escolar; Mike Hawker
- Producer: Juan Carlos Calderón

Luis Miguel singles chronology
"Todo el Amor del Mundo" (1986)	"Ahora Te Puedes Marchar" (1987)	"No Me Puedo Escapar de Ti" (1987)

Audio sample
- file; help

"Ahora Te Puedes Marchar" (in English: "Now You Can Leave") is a song by Mexican singer Luis Miguel, released as the lead single from his fifth studio album, Soy Como Quiero Ser (1987). Written by Ivor Raymonde, Luis Gómez-Escolar, and Mike Hawker, it is a Spanish-language adaptation of the 1964 song "I Only Want to Be with You" by Dusty Springfield, though the song differs lyrically.

== Background and promotion ==
In 1987, Luis Miguel released his fifth studio album Soy Como Quiero Ser, via Warner Music Latina. The track "Ahora Te Puedes Marchar" was released as the album's lead single. The song is a Spanish-language adaptation of Dusty Springfield's 1964 single "I Only Want to Be with You", with the translated lyrics being written by Luis Gómez-Escolar. Contrary to the original song, the Spanish lyrics find Miguel telling a former lover "now you can walk away", after not having been a good partner.

"Ahora Te Puedes Marchar" was featured as the first track on Miguel's greatest hits album, Grandes Exitos (2005). The song was additionally released as "Agora Você Pode Ir" on the 1988 Portuguese-language release of Soy Como Quiero Ser.

== Chart performance ==
The song entered several Latin American record charts, published by El Informador. It topped charts in Mexico and Santiago, and peaked at number 9 in Panama. In the US, it went on to be Miguel's first number-one hit on the Billboard Hot Latin Songs chart, making Miguel at the time the youngest artist to top the chart at 17 years old.

== Charts ==
=== Weekly charts ===
Chart (1987)	Peak position
Panama (UPI)	9
Santiago (UPI)	1
Mexico (AMPROFON)	1
US Hot Latin Songs (Billboard)	1

=== Year-end charts ===
Chart (1987)	Peak position
US Hot Latin Songs (Billboard)	11

== Certifications ==
Region	Certification	Certified units/sales
Spain (Promusicae)	Platinum	60,000^{‡}
^{‡} Sales+streaming figures based on certification alone.

== Super Junior version ==
South Korean boy band Super Junior released the cover of "Ahora Te Puedes Marchar" on October 8, 2018, as the fourth track on their Latin pop extended play One More Time. On March 2, 2019, they released a music video for the song as a promotion for their tour Super Show 7S. The video is a tribute to its original iteration and was shot to mimic its cinematography, with the members of the band taking turns acting as Miguel. Since its release, the song has become a staple of Super Junior's tour setlist and was performed in the Latin American legs of Super Show 9: Road (2023), and Super Show 10 (2025). In addition, they had also performed the song at the Telehit 25th anniversary concert in Mexico, and at the two-day concert SMTown Special Stage in Santiago.
