= Busca una Mujer =

Studio album by Luis Miguel
- Released: November 25, 1988
- Recorded: 1988
- Studios: Studio 55 (Hollywood, California); Torresonido (Madrid, Spain); Ocean Way Studios (Hollywood, California); Precision Lacquer (Hollywood, California); Suma Music Group (West Hollywood, California); Estudio Mediterranean Sound (Ibiza, Spain)
- Genre: Latin pop
- Length: 38:53
- Language: Spanish
- Label: Warner Music
- Producer: Juan Carlos Calderón

Luis Miguel chronology
Soy Como Quiero Ser (1987)	Busca una Mujer (1988)	20 Años (1990)

Singles from Busca una Mujer
- 1. "Fría Como el Viento" Released: 1988; 2. "Separados" Released: 1988; 3. "La Incondicional" Released: 1989; 4. "Un Hombre Busca una Mujer" Released: 1989; 5. "Culpable o No (Miénteme Como Siempre)" Released: 1989; 6. "Esa Niña" Released: 1989; 7. "El Primero" Released: 1989

Professional ratings
Review scores
Source	Rating
Allmusic	3/5 stars

Busca una Mujer (English: Looking for a Woman), also known as Un Hombre Busca una Mujer, is the sixth studio album by Mexican singer Luis Miguel. It was mainly written and produced by Juan Carlos Calderón, and released on November 25, 1988, as the second album released with Warner Music. "Fría Como el Viento" was released as the album's lead single, which spent seven months on the top-ten of many record charts in Latin America. The success of "Fría Como el Viento" almost overshadowed the rest of the singles released from the album ("Separados", "La Incondicional", "Un Hombre Busca una Mujer", "Culpable o No (Miénteme Como Siempre)", "Esa Niña" and "El Primero" ). The album title was simply Busca una Mujer since his name would complement the title (i.e. meaning Luis Miguel Busca una Mujer). On the Billboard Billboard Hot Latin Songs Year-End Chart of 1989, "La Incondicional" appeared at number three. "Separados" has since become known among fans of professional wrestling for being the entrance theme of Japanese masked wrestler Último Dragón, outside of his tenure in WWE.

== Promotion ==
To promote the album, Luis Miguel embarked on a tour during 1989 and 1990. In 1989 a VHS video was released, a compilation of his concerts in Mexico called Un Año de Conciertos.

== Track listing ==
All tracks are written by Juan Carlos Calderón, except where noted.

No.	Title	Writer(s)	Length
1.	"Fría Como el Viento"		3:55
2.	"Esa Niña"		4:05
3.	"Culpable o No (Miénteme Como Siempre)"		3:56
4.	"Un Hombre Busca una Mujer"	Calderón; Luis Gómez-Escolar	3:34
5.	"La Incondicional"		4:25
6.	"Separados"	Calderón; Escolar	3:35
7.	"Por Favor Señora"		4:00
8.	"Pupilas de Gato"	Luna Fría	3:57
9.	"El Primero"	Calderón; Escolar	3:14
10.	"Soy Un Perdedor"	Tito Duarte	4:12
Total length:			38:53

Brazilian version

The Brazilian version of Busca Una Mujer was released in 1988 with 2 songs in Portuguese, “Fria Como O Vento” and “A Incondicional”.

== Personnel ==
Adapted from the Busca Una Mujer liner notes:

=== Performance credits ===
- Juan Carlos Calderón – keyboards (tracks 1, 3–5, 7), arranger (1–5, 7, 9), chorus arrangement (2, 4–6, 10)
- Randy Kerber – keyboards (all tracks), arranger (6, 8, 10), brass arranger (10)
- K.C. Porter – keyboards (tracks 2, 9), arranger (2, 9)
- Dennis Belfield – bass (all tracks)
- John Robinson – drums (tracks 1, 3–5, 9)
- Jeff Porcaro – drums (tracks 2, 6–8, 10)
- Paul Jackson Jr. – guitar (all tracks)
- Buzz Feiten – guitar (track 2), guitar solo (1, 7)
- Jerry Hey – brass (tracks 4, 10)
- Gary Grant – brass (tracks 4, 10)
- Kim Hutchcroft – brass (tracks 4, 10)
- Alan Kaplan – brass (tracks 4, 10)
- Lew McCreary – brass (tracks 4, 10)
- Antonio Molto – saxophone solo (tracks 1–2)
- Conjunto de Cuerda de Madrid – strings (tracks 1, 3, 5, 7, 9)
- Luis Miguel – background vocals (tracks 2, 6, 7, 10), brass arranger (10)
- Andrea Bronston – background vocals (tracks 2, 4–5, 7, 9–10)
- Mary Jamison – background vocals (tracks 2, 7, 10)
- Doris – background vocals (tracks 4–6, 9)
- Huevo – background vocals (tracks 4–6)
- Mikel – background vocals (tracks 4–6)

=== Technical credits ===
- Juan Carlos Calderón – producer
- Benny Faccone – engineer (rhythmic bases, dubbing, brass section)
- Brad Gilderman – mixer
- Stephen Marcussen – mastering engineer
- Carlos Martos – engineer (voice recording)
- Vicente – engineer (voice recording)
- Joaquin Torres – engineer (strings, additional dubs)
- Ivy Skoff – production coordination
- Carlos Somonte – photography
- Gilardi M/W S.A. publicidad – design

=== Recording and mixing locations ===
- Studio 55, Hollywood, California – rhythmic bases and dubbing
- Torresonido, Madrid, Spain – strings and additional dubs
- Ocean Way Studios, Hollywood, California – brass section
- Precision Lacquer, Hollywood, California – mastering
- Suma Music Group, West Hollywood, California – mixing
- Estudio Mediterranean Sound, Ibiza, Spain – Luis Miguel's voice recording

== Chart performance ==
=== Album ===
==== Weekly charts ====
Weekly chart performance for Busca una Mujer
Chart (1989)	Peak position
US Latin Pop Albums (Billboard)	4

Chart (2003)	Peak position
Spanish Albums (PROMUSICAE)	85

Chart (2018)	Peak position
Mexican Albums (AMPROFON)	21

==== Year-end charts ====
Year-end chart performance for Busca una Mujer
Chart (1989)	Position
US Latin Pop Albums (Billboard)	11

Chart (1990)	Position
US Latin Pop Albums (Billboard)	25

Chart (2018)	Position
Mexican Albums (AMPROFON)	98

=== Singles ===
Year	Chart	Single	Peak
1988	Billboard Hot Latin Tracks	Un Hombre Busca Una Mujer	5
1988	Billboard Hot Latin Tracks	La Incondicional	1
1988	Billboard Hot Latin Tracks	Fría Como El Viento	1
1989	Billboard Hot Latin Tracks	Separados	8
1989	Billboard Hot Latin Tracks	Esa Niña	35
1989	Billboard Hot Latin Tracks	Culpable O No (Miénteme Como Siempre)	22
2018	Mexico Streaming (AMPROFON)	Culpable O No (Miénteme Como Siempre)	6

== Certifications and sales ==
Region	Certification	Certified units/sales
Argentina (CAPIF)	4× Platinum	240,000^{^}
Bolivia	Platinum	
Chile	Gold	120,000
Ecuador	Gold	50,000
Mexico (AMPROFON)	10× Gold	1,400,000
Peru	Gold	
Spain (Promusicae)	Platinum	100,000^{^}
United States	—	85,000
Summaries
Worldwide	—	3,000,000
^{^} Shipments figures based on certification alone.

== See also ==
- List of best-selling albums in Mexico
- List of best-selling Latin albums
