= Fría Como el Viento =

Single by Luis Miguel

from the album Busca Una Mujer
- B-side: "Pupilas de Gato"
- Released: 1988
- Recorded: 1987–1988; Estudios 55; Ocean Way Recording Studios; Suma Music Group (Hollywood, California); Torresonido (Madrid, Spain); Mediterranean Sound Studio (Ibiza, Spain)
- Genre: Latin
- Length: 3:55
- Label: WEA Latina
- Songwriter: Juan Carlos Calderón
- Producer: Juan Carlos Calderón

Luis Miguel singles chronology
"Yo Que No Vivo Sin Tí" (1988)	"Fría Como el Viento" (1988)	"Separados" (1988)

"Fría Como el Viento" ("Cold as the Wind") is a ballad written, produced and arranged by Juan Carlos Calderón and performed by Mexican singer Luis Miguel. It was released as the first single from the Grammy-nominated studio album Busca una Mujer (1988). The song became the third number-one single for the singer in the Billboard Hot Latin Tracks chart after "Ahora Te Puedes Marchar" in 1987 and "La Incondicional", the preceding single.

The song has been performed by the singer on promotional tours, mostly on medleys along with songs from his 1980s repertoire. Also, several performers have recorded cover versions, including Los Byby's, Fuera de Liga, Mazz, Grieta Calderòn, Grupo El Momento, The Latin Stars Orchestra, El Momento vs. Hijo de Chila, Frankie Negrón, New Variety Band, Los Player's, Silva Y Guerra and Terrazas Musical.

Shortly after its release a Portuguese adaptation was created called “Fria Como O Vento”. Similar to the original Spanish it has nearly the same lyrics but the bass and tone of the song are a little different to clearly distinguish the difference between the two songs.

== Song history ==
Released as the third single from Luis Miguel's studio album Busca Una Mujer, "Fría Como el Viento" became a very successful song and was included on the track list for his 20 Años Tour in 1990. Five years later, during his live performances in the National Auditorium in México City, the song was performed in a medley along "Yo Que No Vivo Sin Tí", "Culpable O No", "Más Allá de Todo", "Entrégate", "Tengo Todo Excepto a Tí", and "La Incondicional". This medley was later included on his album El Concierto. In 2005, the song was included on the compilation album Grandes Éxitos. There were rumors about the re-recording of this song as a duet with Mexican singer Paulina Rubio or Chilean performer Myriam Hernández. However, this recording never took place since was announced that Miguel's following album at the time, Cómplices (2008), would be his first full-length album written and produced by Spanish singer-songwriter Manuel Alejandro.

== Chart performance ==
The song debuted on the Billboard Hot Latin Tracks chart at Number 27 in the week of September 2, 1989, climbing to the top ten four weeks later. "Fría Como el Viento" peaked at No. 1 on October 21, 1989, on its eighth week, holding this position for two consecutive weeks, replacing "Si Voy a Perderte" by Cuban-American singer-songwriter Gloria Estefan and being replaced by Chayanne with "Fuiste un Trozo de Hielo en la Escarcha". Two weeks later the song reached the top spot for a second week, being succeeded one week later by Chayanne. The song ranked Number 30 on the Hot Latin Tracks year-end charts of 1989.

== Charts ==
=== Weekly charts ===
Chart (1989)	Peak position
El Salvador (UPI)	2
Mexico (AMPROFON)	1
Peru (UPI)	1
US Hot Latin Songs (Billboard)	1
Venezuela (UPI)	4

== See also ==
- List of number-one Billboard Top Latin Songs from the 1980s
