= La Incondicional =

Single by Luis Miguel

from the album Busca una Mujer
- B-side: "Separados"
- Released: February 20, 1989
- Recorded: 1988
- Studio: Estudios 55; Ocean Way Recording Studios; Suma Music Group (Hollywood, California); Torres Sonido (Madrid, Spain); Mediterranean Sound Studio (Ibiza, Spain)
- Genre: Latin
- Length: 4:27
- Label: WEA Latina
- Songwriter: Juan Carlos Calderón
- Producer: Juan Carlos Calderón

Luis Miguel singles chronology
"Separados" (1988)	"La Incondicional" (1989)	"Un Hombre Busca Una Mujer" (1989)

"La Incondicional" ("The Unconditional") is a song written, produced, and arranged by Spanish musician Juan Carlos Calderón and performed by Mexican singer Luis Miguel. It was released in 1989 via WEA Latina as the third single from Miguel's sixth studio album, Busca una Mujer (1988). The song became his second #1 single on the Billboard Hot Latin Tracks chart after "Ahora Te Puedes Marchar" in 1987. The song broke several airplay records in Latin America, topping the charts in Mexico (where it became the biggest hit of the year), Chile and Peru; and the top-ten in other countries. The success of the song helped push the album to #3 on the Billboard Latin Pop Albums with approximate sales of four million units.

"La Incondicional" won Pop Song of the Year at the Premios Lo Nuestro in 1990. In 2008, the North feed of VH1 Latin America aired the program entitled The 100 Greatest Songs of the '80s in Spanish, which declared "La Incondicional" as the #1 Spanish track of the 1980s.

== Chart performance ==
The song debuted on the Billboard Hot Latin Tracks chart at #32 the week of April 1, 1989. After its first week at #32, it dropped out of the chart for one week but then reentered the following week at #36 and climbed all the way to the Top Ten the week of May 6, 1989. "La Incondicional" reached #1 the week of May 27, 1989, and held this position for seven consecutive weeks, replacing "Cómo Tú" by José José and being replaced by "Baila Mi Rumba" by José Luis Rodríguez. "La Incondicional" ranked third in the Hot Latin Tracks Year-End Chart of 1989 and became Luis Miguel's second #1 single in the United States following "Ahora Te Puedes Marchar" which reached #1 two years earlier. In Latin America, "La Incondicional" reached number one in Mexico and it was certified gold. Additionally, the song topped the charts in Chile and Peru; and reached the top-ten in Colombia, Ecuador, Panama and Puerto Rico.

== Music video ==
A music video was directed by Pedro Torres, and was one of the first super-productions presented in Mexico. The music video was filmed in locations of Heroico Colegio Militar in Mexico City. The story was about a man who serves for the Mexican Air Force in his country, and separates from the love of his life. The music video surprised some of his fans because Luis Miguel's look at the time had him sport a semi-long hairstyle, yet in the video he appears with a very short military hairstyle. It was included in Grandes Exitos Videos. In the long version of the music video, Luis Miguel is having his hair cut to simulate military standards.

== Cover versions ==
"La Incondicional" has been covered by several performers including the All Stars Big Band, Miguel Angel, Austin, Banda Viejo Oeste, Richard Clayderman, Ernesto D'Alessio, Estilo de Durango, Fabian, Florida, Mikel Herzog, Juan Gotti, the Latin Stars Orchestra, the Latin Tribute Players, Edith Márquez, Los Nietos, Nu Flavor, La Posta, Emilio Santiago, and Tropical Florida.

Sergio Vargas of the Dominican Republic also recorded a tropical merengue version of the song which was included on his self-titled fourth album. This version peaked at #28 on the Billboard Hot Latin Tracks chart in 1990.

Spanish singer Elsa Ríos included a version of the song on her 2007 album also entitled La Incondicional which was a Juan Carlos Calderón tribute album. The album peaked at #61 on the Spanish Album Chart.

Taiwan-born, Hong Kong-based singer Sally Yeh also recorded a Cantopop version titled 他(Him) for her 1990 album 珍重 sung in the Chinese language of Cantonese.

== Charts and certifications ==
=== Weekly charts ===
Chart (1989–90)	Peak position
Chile (UPI)	1
Colombia (UPI)	3
Ecuador (UPI)	7
Mexico (AMPROFON)	1
Panama (UPI)	6
Peru (UPI)	1
Puerto Rico (UPI)	2
US Hot Latin Songs (Billboard)	1

=== Certifications ===
Region	Certification	Certified units/sales
Mexico (AMPROFON)	Gold	30,000^{*}
Spain (Promusicae)	Platinum	60,000^{‡}
^{*} Sales figures based on certification alone.^{‡} Sales+streaming figures based on certification alone.
