= Cuando calienta el sol (song) =

Popular Spanish language song

"Cuando calienta el sol" (meaning When the sun heats (or warms) up) is a popular Spanish language song originally composed as "Cuando calienta el sol en Masachapa", Masachapa being a coastal town in Nicaragua. The music was written by Rafael Gaston Perez, a Nicaraguan songwriter and bandleader. The Argentine Society of Music Authors and Composers credits the Argentine composer Carlos Albert Martinoli.

The song was published in 1961 and made famous by the Cuban Mexican vocal group Los Hermanos Rigual with the lyrics by Carlos Rigual and Mario Rigual from the band. It was a big hit in many European charts, reaching No. 1 in Italy, and staying at the top for four consecutive weeks.

The song has been interpreted by a singers such as Javier Solis, Alberto Vázquez, Connie Francis, Los Marcellos Ferial, Pablo Montero, Raffaella Carrà. Italian singer Ines Taddio covered the song on his album with the Hungarian dance band Club Együttes in 1963. In 1967, Vikki Carr recorded the song on her album "The Liberty Years." Mexican singer Luis Miguel covered the song on his album Soy Como Quiero Ser in 1987, produced by Juan Carlos Calderón. It was released as the third single from the album and peaked at No. 50 on the Billboard Hot Latin Songs chart in the United States. The music video for Miguel's version was directed by Pedro Torres and filmed in Acapulco.

Character Bruno Cortona, played by Vittorio Gassman in the classic Il Sorpasso (1962) sings, in Spanish, the first verse of "Cuando Calienta el sol" in a beach scene.

== Adaptations ==
=== Love Me with All Your Heart ===
The song was adapted into English with the English lyrics credited to Michael Vaughn (or Maurice Vaughn) and sometimes to Sunny Skylar. The English lyrics are not a translation of the original lyrics.

- A version recorded by The Ray Charles Singers went to No. 3 on the Billboard Hot 100 and spent four weeks at No. 1 on the Pop-Standard singles chart in June 1964.
- Karl Denver's version charted at No. 37 in the UK in 1964.
- The Bachelors version reached No. 38 on U.S. Pop charts in 1966.
- Johnny Rodriguez version made it to No. 7 on the U.S. country charts in 1978.
- Other notable versions include those by Andy Russell, Carr, The Lettermen, Bing Crosby, Petula Clark, Engelbert Humperdinck, Nancy Sinatra, Agnetha Fältskog, and Jim Nabors.

=== Quand le soleil était là ===
The song was adapted into French language as "Quand le soleil était là" and was recorded by Gloria Lasso, and in 1962 by artists in French including Bob Azzam, John William, Florence Passy and Rosy Armen, Ginette Ravel recorded the song in 1963.

=== Other languages ===
There are many language interpretations including by Lola Novakovic as "Zalazak sunca" (in Serbo-Croat), and Croat singers Trio Tividi and Gabi Novak as "Kad zalazi sunce". There is also a version in Portuguese sung by Marco Paulo titled "Sempre que Brilha o Sol".

== See also ==
- List of number-one hits of 1962 (Italy)
