= Juan Carlos Calderón =

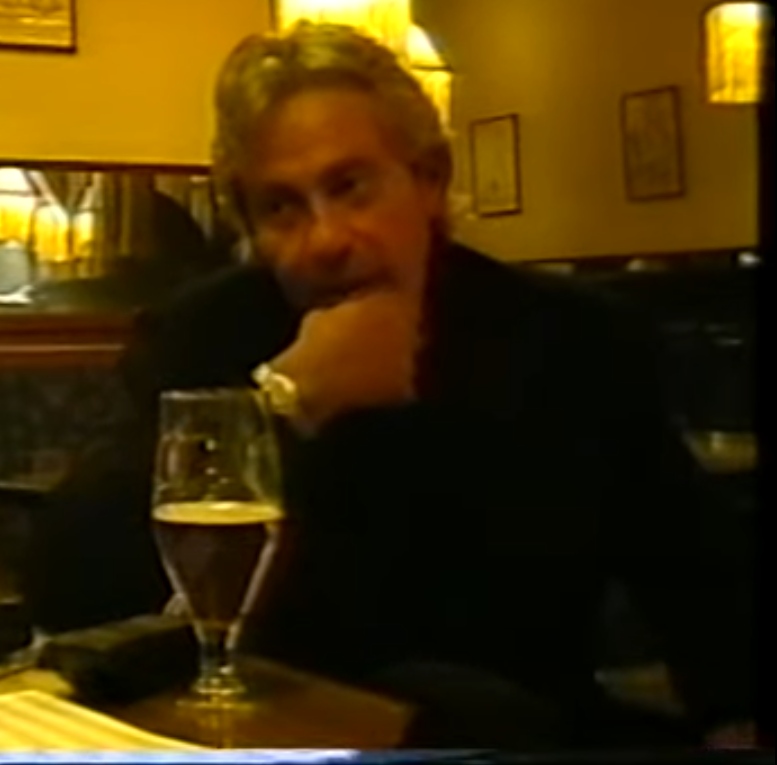

Background information
- Born: Juan Carlos Calderón López de Arróyabe; 7 July 1936; Santander, Spain
- Died: 26 November 2012 (aged 76) Madrid, Spain
- Genres: Pop; jazz; bolero
- Occupations: Singer; songwriter; musician; record producer
- Instrument: Piano
- Years active: 1970s–2010s

Juan Carlos Calderón López de Arróyabe (7 July 1936 – 26 November 2012) was a Spanish composer, arranger and music/record producer.

== Career ==
Born in Santander, he was the author of "Eres tú", which, performed by Mocedades, came second in the Eurovision Song Contest 1973. It was an important hit in several countries, including the United States. He wrote another three Eurovision entries: "Tú volverás" by Sergio y Estíbaliz in 1975, "La fiesta terminó" by Paloma San Basilio in 1985, and "Nacida para amar" by Nina in 1989; as well as an entry for the OTI Festival: "Amor de medianoche", which ended up runner-up in 1975 performed by Cecilia. He also wrote music for several movies, including the horror films Vengeance of the Zombies (1973) and Blue Eyes of the Broken Doll (1974). In 1968 he won an Ondas Award. He wrote songs for artists like Luis Miguel (who received a nomination for Song of the Year at Latin Grammy Awards in 2000 with a Calderón song, "O Tú o Ninguna"), Julio Iglesias, Joan Manuel Serrat, Donald Byrd, Stéphane Grappelli, Bill Coleman, Pedro Iturralde, Herb Alpert, Chayanne, Nino Bravo, Camilo Sesto, Paloma San Basilio, Rocío Dúrcal, David Bustamante, Mari Trini, José José, Manuel Mijares, Marcos Llunas, María Conchita Alonso and Myriam Hernández, among others
