= Romance Tour (Luis Miguel) =

1991–92 concert tour by Luis Miguel

- Tour by Luis Miguel
- Associated album: Romance
- Start date: September 12, 1991
- End date: December 19, 1992
- Legs: 2
- No. of shows: TBD

Luis Miguel concert chronology
- 20 Años Tour (1990–91); Romance Tour (1991–92); Aries Tour (1993–94)

The Romance Tour was launched by Luis Miguel to some United States countries, Latin American and Spain to promote his album Romance. During this tour he made the first season of his career in Las Vegas, performing four nights at Circus Maximus Showroom of Caesars Palace. He played a concert in Seville during the Universal Exposition 1992, and in the National Auditorium in Mexico City, where he broke the World Record by selling the 10,000 tickets for his only show in 3 hours. Near the end of the tour, he had to postpone two concerts in Argentina to travel to Spain, due to the death of his father Luisito Rey.

== Set list ==
Romance Tour: Leg 1 – September 1991 – April 1992

This set list is from the November 2, 1991, concert in Chicago. It is not intended to represent all concerts for this leg.

1. "Introduction"
2. "Oro De Ley"
3. "Yo Que No Vivo Sin Ti"
4. "Amante Del Amor"
5. "Pupilas De Gato"
6. "Hoy El Aire Huele A Ti"
7. "Culpable O No"
8. "Ahora Te Puedes Marchar"
9. "Más Allá De Todo"
10. "Alguien Como Tú" (Somebody In Your Life)
11. "Entrégate":
12. "Fría Como el Viento" (Salsa version)
13. "Renacer" (Gloria Estefan cover)
14. "Tengo Todo Excepto a Ti"
15. "Interlude" (Band)
16. "Será Que No Me Amas"
17. "La Barca" (with trio)
18. "Mucho Corazón" (with trio)
19. "De Que Manera Te Olvido" (with trio)
20. "Un Hombre Busca Una Mujer"
21. "La Incondicional"
22. "Cuando Calienta El Sol"
Romance Tour: Leg 2 – May–December 1992

This set list is from the June 26, 1992, concert in Mexico City. It is not intended to represent all concerts for this leg.

1. "Introduction"
2. "Oro De Ley"
3. "Amante Del Amor"
4. "Pupilas De Gato"
5. "Hoy El Aire Huele A Ti"
6. "Ahora Te Puedes Marchar"
7. "Alguien Como Tú"
8. "Entrégate":
9. "Tengo Todo Excepto a Ti"
10. "Interlude" (Band)
11. "Será Que No Me Amas"
12. "No Me Platiques Más"
13. "Contigo En La Distancia"
14. "La Puerta"
15. "La Mentira"
16. "Cuando Vuelva A Tú Lado"
17. "No Sé Tú"
18. "Inolvidable"
19. "Un Hombre Busca Una Mujer"
20. "Cuando Calienta El Sol"

== Tour dates ==
List of concerts, showing date, city, country and venue
Date	City	Country	Venue
North America
September 12, 1991	Mexico City	Mexico	Auditorio Nacional
September 16, 1991	Mexico City	Mexico	Auditorio Nacional
South America
October 3, 1991	Lima	Peru	—
October 4, 1991	Lima	Peru	—
October 5, 1991	Lima	Peru	—
October ?, 1991	Guayaquil	Ecuador	Coliseo Cerrado
October 11, 1991	Quito	Ecuador	Plaza de toros de Quito
North America
October 18, 1991	San Diego	United States	San Diego Convention Center
October 19, 1991	San José	United States	San José State Recreation Center
October 20, 1991	Los Angeles	United States	Universal Amphitheatre
October 25, 1991	Houston	United States	Jones Hall
October 27, 1991	Dallas	United States	—
November 2, 1991	Chicago	United States	Arie Crown Theater
November 3, 1991	New York City	United States	Paramount Theater
November 15, 1991	Santo Domingo	Dominican Republic	Hotel Jaragua
November 16, 1991	Santo Domingo	Dominican Republic	Hotel Jaragua
November 30, 1991	San Juan	Puerto Rico	Roberto Clemente Coliseum
December 1, 1991	San Juan	Puerto Rico	Roberto Clemente Coliseum
Central America
December 7, 1991	Guatemala City	Guatemala	Estadio La Pedrera
December 8, 1991	Guatemala City	Guatemala	Estadio La Pedrera
December ?, 1991	Managua	Nicaragua	—
December ?, 1991	Managua	Nicaragua	—
North America
December 16, 1991	Mexico City	Mexico	Auditorio Nacional
December 31, 1991 (Note: The December 31 show in Acapulco show was recorded for its partial transmission in México by Las Estrellas)	Acapulco	Mexico	Hotel Hyatt Regency
January 31, 1992	Mexico City	Mexico	Centro de Espectáculos D'Cristal
February 1, 1992	Mexico City	Mexico	Centro de Espectáculos D'Cristal
South America
February 5, 1992 (Note: TV concert broadcast by Venevisión)	Caracas	Venezuela	Venevisión Studios
North America
February 15, 1992	Tampico	Mexico	Hotel Camino Real
February 16, 1992	Ciudad Madero	Mexico	Centro de Convenciones
February 28, 1992 (Note: Dinner Show)	Ciudad Juárez	Mexico	Centro de Comercio Exterior
February 29, 1992	Ciudad Juárez	Mexico	Gimnasio Universitario UACJ
March 2, 1992	Mazatlán	Mexico	Estadio Teodoro Mariscal
March 7, 1992	Mexico City	Mexico	Centro Asturiano
March 15, 1992	Aguascalientes	Mexico	—
March 20, 1992	Monterrey	Mexico	Plaza de Toros Monumental
March 21, 1992	Monterrey	Mexico	Plaza de Toros Monumental
March 22, 1992	Torreón	Mexico	Auditorio Municipal
March 27, 1992	Mexico City	Mexico	Centro Asturiano (Private Show)
April 3, 1992	Guadalajara	Mexico	Expo Guadalajara
April 12, 1992	Veracruz	Mexico	—
April ?, 1992	Villahermosa	Mexico	—
April 18, 1992	Puerto Vallarta	Mexico	Casino Flamingos
April 22, 1992	San Juan	Puerto Rico	Centro de Convenciones
April 23, 1992	San Juan	Puerto Rico	Centro de Convenciones
April 24, 1992	San Juan	Puerto Rico	Centro de Convenciones
April 26, 1992	Miami	United States	James L. Knight Center
May 2, 1992	Fresno	United States	Paul Paul Theater
Central America
May 9, 1992	Heredia	Costa Rica	Palacio de los Deportes
May 10, 1992	Heredia	Costa Rica	Palacio de los Deportes
South America
May 14, 1992	Valencia	Venezuela	Hotel Intercontinental
May 15, 1992	Maracaibo	Venezuela	Coliseo
May 16, 1992	Caracas	Venezuela	Poliedro de Caracas
May 17, 1992	Caracas	Venezuela	Poliedro de Caracas
May 22, 1992	San Cristóbal	Venezuela	—
May 24, 1992	Caracas	Venezuela	Hotel Caracas Hitlon
Central America
May 26, 1992	Panama City	Panama	Teatro Anayansi
North America
May 29, 1992	Tijuana	Mexico	Hotel Fiesta Americana
May 30, 1992	Mexicali	Mexico	Plaza de Toros Calafia
May 31, 1992	Tijuana	Mexico	Auditorio Fausto Gutierrez Moreno
June 3, 1992	Mexico City	Mexico	Salón del Bosque (Private show)
June 5, 1992	León	Mexico	Estadio La Martinica
June 6, 1992	Morelia	Mexico	Plaza de Toros Monumental
South America
June 11, 1992 (Note: Concert with Carlos Vives)	Medellín	Colombia	—
June 12, 1992	Bogotá	Colombia	Estadio El Campín
June 14, 1992	Cali	Colombia	Estadio Olímpico Pascual Guerrero
North America
June 19, 1992	Xalapa	Mexico	Gimnasio Omega
June 20, 1992	Minatitlán	Mexico	—
June 23, 1992	Mexico City	Mexico	Teatro San Rafael
June 26, 1992 (Note: Luis Miguel released three songs of this concert for his EP "América & en Vivo", and also was fully recorded for his VHS video Romance: En Vivo)	Mexico City	Mexico	Auditorio Nacional
June 27, 1992	Puebla	Mexico	Estadio de Béisbol Hermanos Serdán
Central America
August 13, 1992	San Salvador	El Salvador	—
North America
August 21, 1992	Mexico City	Mexico	Palacio de los Deportes
September 11, 1992	Las Vegas	United States	Circus Maximus Showroom
September 13, 1992	Las Vegas	United States	Circus Maximus Showroom
September 14, 1992	Las Vegas	United States	Circus Maximus Showroom
September 15, 1992 (Note: Private show.)	Las Vegas	United States	Circus Maximus Showroom
September 17, 1992 (Note: Benefit gala show for 1,100 people, in which he raised more than $90,000 for the American Cancer Society.)	Beverly Hills	United States	The Beverly Hilton
Europe
October 3, 1992 (Note: The October 3 show in Seville was recorded for its transmission in México by Televisa)	Seville	Spain	Plaza Sony (Expo '92)
North America
October 10, 1992	Los Angeles	United States	Universal Amphitheatre
November 12, 1992	Mexico City	Mexico	Auditorio Nacional
South America
November 27, 1992	Lima	Peru	Jockey Club del Perú
November 28, 1992	Lima	Peru	Jockey Club del Perú
November 29, 1992	Lima	Peru	Estadio Alianza Lima
December 4, 1992	Buenos Aires	Argentina	Estadio Luna Park
December 5, 1992	Buenos Aires	Argentina	Estadio Luna Park
December 6, 1992	San Bernardino	Paraguay	Anfiteatro José Asunción Flores
December 7, 1992	Asunción	Paraguay	Teatro Hotel Guaraní
December 12, 1992 (Note: First concert after the death of his father.)	Buenos Aires	Argentina	Estadio Luna Park
December 13, 1992 (Note: TV show hosted by Marcelo Tinelli in which he performed five songs. He also received the quintuple platinum award for the sales in Argentina of "Romance".)	Buenos Aires	Argentina	Ritmo de la Noche
December 14, 1992	Tucumán	Argentina	Estadio Monumental José Fierro
December 15, 1992 (Note: The December 15, 1992 concert at Luna Park in Buenos Aires was originally scheduled to take place on December 11, 1992, but was postponed due to his father's death.)	Buenos Aires	Argentina	Estadio Luna Park
December 16, 1992 (Note: The December 16, 1992 concert at Estadio Córdoba in Córdoba was originally scheduled to take place on December 9, 1992, but was postponed due to his father's death.)	Córdoba	Argentina	Estadio Chateau Carreras
December 17, 1992	Buenos Aires	Argentina	Estadio Luna Park
December 18, 1992	Buenos Aires	Argentina	Estadio Luna Park
December 19, 1992	Santiago	Chile	Estadio San Carlos de Apoquindo

- Note: Some dates and venues are missing, and others may be wrong, due to the lack of reliable sources.

=== Box office score data ===
Venue	City	Tickets sold / available	Gross revenue
Auditorio Nacional (Nov 12)	Mexico City	9,885 / 9,902	$439,229
	Total	9,885 / 9,902 (99,8%)	$439,229

== Cancelled shows ==
List of cancelled concerts, showing date, city, country, venue, and reason for cancellation
Date	City	Country	Venue	Reason
October 26, 1991	El Paso	United States	Special Event Center	Unknown

== Band ==
- Vocals: Luis Miguel
- Musical director: Juan Carlos Toribio
- Acoustic & electric guitar: Kiko Cibrian
- Bass: Rudy Machorro
- Piano & keyboards: Juan Carlos Toribio
- Keyboards: Arturo Pérez
- Drums: Fernando Caballero
- Percussion & chorus: Alfredo Algarin
- Saxophone: Jeff Nathanson
- Trumpet: Juan Manuel Arpero
- Trumpet: José Villar
- Backing vocals: Patricia Tanus, Eva María Bojalil
- Trio: Los Pao
