= Luis Miguel videography =

The following is a list of music videos and video releases from Luis Miguel.

== Music videos ==
Music videos
Album	Videos	Link
Un sol	"1+1=2 enamorados" "Adolescente soñador"	
Directo al corazón	"Directo al corazón" "La juventud"	
Decídete	"Decídete" "No me puedes dejar así"	
Palabra de honor	"Me gustas tal como eres" "Palabra de honor" "La chica del bikini azul" "Isabel" "Tú no tienes corazón"	N/A
Fiebre de amor	"Fiebre de amor" "Todo el amor del mundo"	N/A
Soy como quiero ser	"Ahora te puedes marchar" (2 versions) "Cuando calienta el sol" "Yo que no vivo sin ti"	
Busca una mujer	"La incondicional" "Fría como el viento"	
20 años	"Tengo todo excepto a ti" "Entrégate" "Será que no me amas"	
Romance	"No sé tú" "Contigo en la distancia"	
América & en vivo	"América, América"	
Aries	"Ayer" "Suave"	
Segundo romance	"Delirio" "El día que me quieras" "La media vuelta"	
El concierto	"Si nos dejan"	
Nada es igual	"Dame" "Cómo es posible que a mi lado" "Sueña"	
Romances	"Por debajo de la mesa"	
Amarte es un placer	"O tú o ninguna" "Dormir contigo" "Amarte es un placer"	
Vivo	"La bikina" "Y"	
Mis romances	"Amor, amor, amor"	
33	"Te necesito"	
Mexico en la piel	"El viajero" "Que seas feliz"	
Navidades	"Santa Claus llegó a la ciudad"	
Cómplices	"Si tú te atreves" "Te desean"	
¡México por siempre!	"La fiesta del mariachi"	

== Video albums ==
Year	Title	Video details	Certifications	Sales
1989	Un Año de Conciertos	Release date: 1989; Studio: Televisa / Warner Music Vision; Format: VHS		
1991	Luis Miguel: 20 Años	Release date: 1991; Studio: Warner Music Vision; Format: VHS		
1992	Romance: En Vivo	Release date: 1992; Studio: Warner Music Vision; Format: VHS		
1995	El Concierto	Release date: 17 October 1995; Studio: Warner Music Vision; Format: VHS / DVD / LaserDisc	CAPIF: Platinum; RIAA: Gold	World: 100,000
1997	Los Videos	Release date: 1997; Studio: Warner Music Vision; Format: VHS		
2000	Vivo	Release date: 24 October 2000; Studio: Warner Music Vision; Format: VHS / DVD	AMPROFON: 2× Platinum; CAPIF: Platinum; PMB: Gold	
2002	Mis Boleros Favoritos	Release date: 8 October 2002; Studio: Warner Music Vision; Format: DVD	CAPIF: Platinum	
2005	Grandes Éxitos Videos	Release date: 22 November 2005; Studio: Warner Music Vision; Format: DVD	AMPROFON: 2× Platinum	
2008	Celebridades	Released: 11 March 2008; Label: EMI Music; Format: DVD		
