= Mania (Menudo album) =

Studio album by Menudo
- Released: 1984
- Studio: Kirios Studios (Madrid)
- Genre: Latin pop
- Label: Edgardo Diaz for Padosa America

Menudo chronology
Con Amor - Tus Éxitos Favoritos (1984)	Mania (1984)	Evolución (1984)

Mania is the fifteenth album by the boy band Menudo and their first album recorded in Portuguese, released in 1984 by the Brazilian label Som Livre. The album features a lineup consisting of Ricky Meléndez, Charlie Massó, Ray Reyes, Roy Rosselló, and Robbi Rosa, and notably marked the final album with Ricky Meléndez, the group's last original member. Comprising Portuguese-language adaptations of hits from four of their previous Spanish-language albums, the project was designed to capitalize on the band's growing popularity in Brazil.

The album was a massive commercial success in the country, becoming Menudo's best-selling release there with over 1.5 million copies sold. Its promotion included an extensive media tour of Brazil, with appearances on major television programs. The lead singles "Não se Reprima" and "Quero Ser" both reached number one on the Brazilian charts and were certified diamond for their high sales.

== Background and context ==
In 1983, the group Menudo signed a six-year contract (for the release of 12 LPs) with RCA Records, a multimillion-dollar deal comparable to those of artists like Kenny Rogers and Diana Ross. The campaign supporting their first English-language album, Reaching Out (1984), was part of RCA's efforts to expand its business beyond its southern borders, including into countries like Brazil.

Following the positive reception of Reaching Out, the Brazilian label Som Livre worked on producing a Portuguese-language album to further expand Menudo's market in the country. The quintet arrived in Brazil during the height of the rock movement, which was gaining ground over traditional rhythms like samba. With radio stations and artists adapting to the genre and significant events like Rock in Rio, the musical landscape was ideal for new trends.

The lineup for this project included Ricky Meléndez, Charlie Massó, Ray Reyes, Roy Rosselló, and Robbi Rosa. Notably, this was the last album featuring Ricky Meléndez as a member of Menudo, marking the end of his seven-year journey with the group. He was the last original member to leave the lineup, later passing his spot to Ricky Martin.

== Production and recording ==
Characterized essentially as a compilation album, featuring the group's greatest hits from previous records, Mania includes a diverse selection of tracks, among which the most notable in Brazil is the song titled "Não se reprima". It features a selection of tracks from four previous albums originally released in Spanish and translated into Portuguese, namely: Quiero Ser (1981), Por Amor (1982), Una aventura llamada Menudo (1982), and A Todo Rock (1983). From the album Quiero Ser (1981), the tracks "Quiero ser" ("Quero Ser"), "Súbete a mi moto" ("Sobe em Minha Moto"), and "Rock en la TV" ("Rock na TV") were adapted. From the album Por Amor (1982), "Dulces besos" ("Doces Beijos") and "Quiero rock" ("Quero Rock") were included. From Una aventura llamada Menudo (1982), the song "Cámbiale las pilas" ("Troque suas Pilhas") was adapted. Finally, from A Todo Rock (1983), the tracks "Indianápolis," "Todo va bien" ("Tudo Vai Bem"), "Si tú no estás" ("Se tu Não Estás"), and "No te reprimas" ("Não se Reprima") appear.

The album was produced by Padosa America, under the direction and production of Edgardo Díaz, with executive production in Portuguese by Carlos Colla. The arrangements and orchestration were handled by Alejandro Monroy and Carlos Villa. Recording and mixing took place at Kirios Studio in Madrid, Spain, with recording engineer Carlos M. Wensell. The photographs were taken by Rio Hernandez, and the sports equipment featured was provided by Playero in Puerto Rico. The entire project was mixed using a digital system.

== Promotion ==
On July 25, 1984, the group Menudo visited Brazil to promote their work, staying in the country for ten days. During their stay, they were lodged at the Caesar Park Hotel and made appearances on several Brazilian television shows, although no live concerts were held during this period. Notable appearances included the Cassino do Chacrinha, Globo de Ouro, and Balão Mágico, all aired by TV Globo. On Viva a Noite (TVS), the group entered on bicycles as part of the "Sonho Maluco" segment. On Record, they participated in Programa Raul Gil during the "Cartas e Cartazes" segment and also appeared on Programa Barros de Alencar. Additionally, they featured on Programa J. Silvestre on Band.

The group's success in Brazil was substantial, prompting Silvio Santos to acquire a package of programs they hosted in Puerto Rico for broadcast in Brazil. These programs, initially aired dubbed, were later recommended to be subtitled or offered with simultaneous translation at the insistence of the group's management. At the time, the dubbing quality was widely criticized.

On October 19, 1984, TV Globo aired a special program titled Menudo Especial, featuring performances of the group's biggest hits and footage from the II Menudo International Festival held in August 1984 in Puerto Rico. Band also produced a special about the group, further solidifying their popularity in Brazil. In November, TV Brasília began airing 26 new episodes of the group's show, each lasting 30 minutes.

== Singles ==
"Não se Reprima" was released as the first single from the album, featuring "Se tu Não Estás" on its B-side on the 7-inch single. The song is a version of "No te reprimas" from the A Todo Rock album, released in 1983. In Brazil, it became a hit, reaching the number one spot for two weeks as the most played song in the country, according to Nelson Oliveira Pesquisa e Estudo de Mercado (Nopem). The group was awarded a diamond disc for the single's sales, having reached 1 million copies, and the song was included in the setlist of the group's first concerts in the country, being performed as the final number.

"Quero Ser" was released as the second single, with the B-side featuring the song "Doces Beijos". It is a Portuguese version of the song "Quiero ser" from the eponymous album released in 1981. The single peaked at number 1 in Brazil, and was also certified diamond in Brazil.

== Critical reception ==
The album was featured in the "new releases" section of Manchete magazine. The critic described it as a "cheerful plaything" and concluded with the remark: "consume it if you want".

== Commercial performance ==
Commercially, it was successful. On the weekly list of best-selling albums in Brazil, audited by Nelson Oliveira Pesquisa e Estudo de Mercado (Nopem), it reached the first position. On the same list, it appeared as the fifth best-selling album in the country for the year 1984.

From a sales perspective, Mania performed remarkably well, establishing itself as Menudo's most commercially successful album in Brazil and a distinctive milestone in the band's heyday. By August 1984, it was already eligible for a Gold Record. In October, 300,000 copies of the album had been sold. By April 1985, it had sold 1.2 million copies in the country. Total sales exceeded 1.5 million copies in Brazil.

== Track listing ==
No.	Title	Writer(s)	Performer	Length
1.	"Não Se Reprima"	C. Villa, A. Monroy, E. Díaz, C. Colla	Charlie Massó	3:04
2.	"Quero Ser"	E. Díaz, P. Soto, C. Colla	Ray Reyes	3:19
3.	"Rock Na TV"	E. Díaz, C. Villa, C. Rabello	Robby Rosa	2:45
4.	"Sobe Em Minha Moto"	E. Díaz, C. Villa, C. Colla	Ricky Meléndez	3:36
5.	"Tudo Vai Bem"	C. Villa, A. Monroy, C. Colla	Charlie Massó	3:09
6.	"Doces Beijos"	J. Seijas, C. Villa, A. Monroy, C. Colla	Robby Rosa	3:33
7.	"Indianápolis"	C. Villa, A. Monroy, E. Díaz, C. Colla	Charlie Massó	3:33
8.	"Se Tu Não Estás"	C. Villa, A. Monroy, E. Díaz, Miguel P.	Robby Rosa	4:26
9.	"Troque Suas Pilhas"	A. Monroy, C. Villa, C. Rabello	Ricky Meléndez	3:30
10.	"Quero Rock"	J. Seijas, C. Villa, A. Monroy, C. Colla	Robby Rosa	2:41
Total length:				33:36

== Chart ==
=== Weekly charts ===
Chart (1984)	Position
Brazil (Nopem)	1

=== Year-end charts ===
Chart (1984)	Position
Brazil (Nopem)	5

== Certifications and sales ==
Region	Certification	Sales
Brazil	Gold	1,500,000
