= Romance (Luis Miguel album) =

Studio album by Luis Miguel
- Released: 19 November 1991
- Recorded: August–September 1991
- Studio: Ocean Way (Hollywood)
- Genre: Bolero
- Length: 44:02
- Language: Spanish
- Label: WEA Latina
- Producers: Luis Miguel; Armando Manzanero

Luis Miguel chronology
20 Años (1990)	Romance (1991)	América & en Vivo (1992)

Singles from Romance
- 1. "Inolvidable" Released: November 1991; 2. "No Sé Tú" Released: February 1992; 3. "Contigo en la Distancia" Released: July 1992

Romance is the eighth studio album by Mexican singer Luis Miguel. It was released by WEA Latina on 19 November 1991. Although the production was originally intended as another collaboration with Juan Carlos Calderón, that plan was scrapped when Calderón was unable to compose songs for the album. Facing a new material deadline in his recording contract, at his manager's suggestion, Miguel chose bolero music for his next project. Mexican singer-songwriter Armando Manzanero was hired by WEA Latina to co-produce the album with Miguel. Recording began in August 1991 at Ocean Way Recording in Hollywood, California, with Bebu Silvetti as the arranger.

On the album, Miguel covers twelve boleros, originally recorded from 1944 to 1986. The first two singles, "Inolvidable" and "No Sé Tú", reached number one on the Billboard Hot Latin Songs chart in the United States and spent six months atop the Mexican charts. "Mucho Corazón" and "Cómo" were in the top five of the Hot Latin Songs chart, and "Usted" and "La Barca" received airplay throughout Latin America. Miguel promoted the record with a tour of the United States and Latin America. The album was generally well received by music critics, who praised Miguel's singing and the record's production. The singer received several accolades, including Luis Miguel's fourth Grammy nomination for Best Latin Pop Album.

Romance sold over eight million copies worldwide, becoming Luis Miguel's all-time bestselling record. In the United States, it spent 16 weeks at number one on the Billboard Latin Pop Albums chart, and was the first Spanish-language album by a non-crossover Latin artist to be certified gold by the Recording Industry Association of America (RIAA); it was also certified gold in Brazil and Taiwan, firsts for a Spanish-speaking artist. Romance is the best-selling album in Argentina. (Note: Attributed in various reports:) The album was noted by critics as reviving interest in bolero music. Its success encouraged Miguel to release three more bolero records: Segundo Romance (1994), Romances (1997), and Mis Romances (2001).

== Background and recording ==
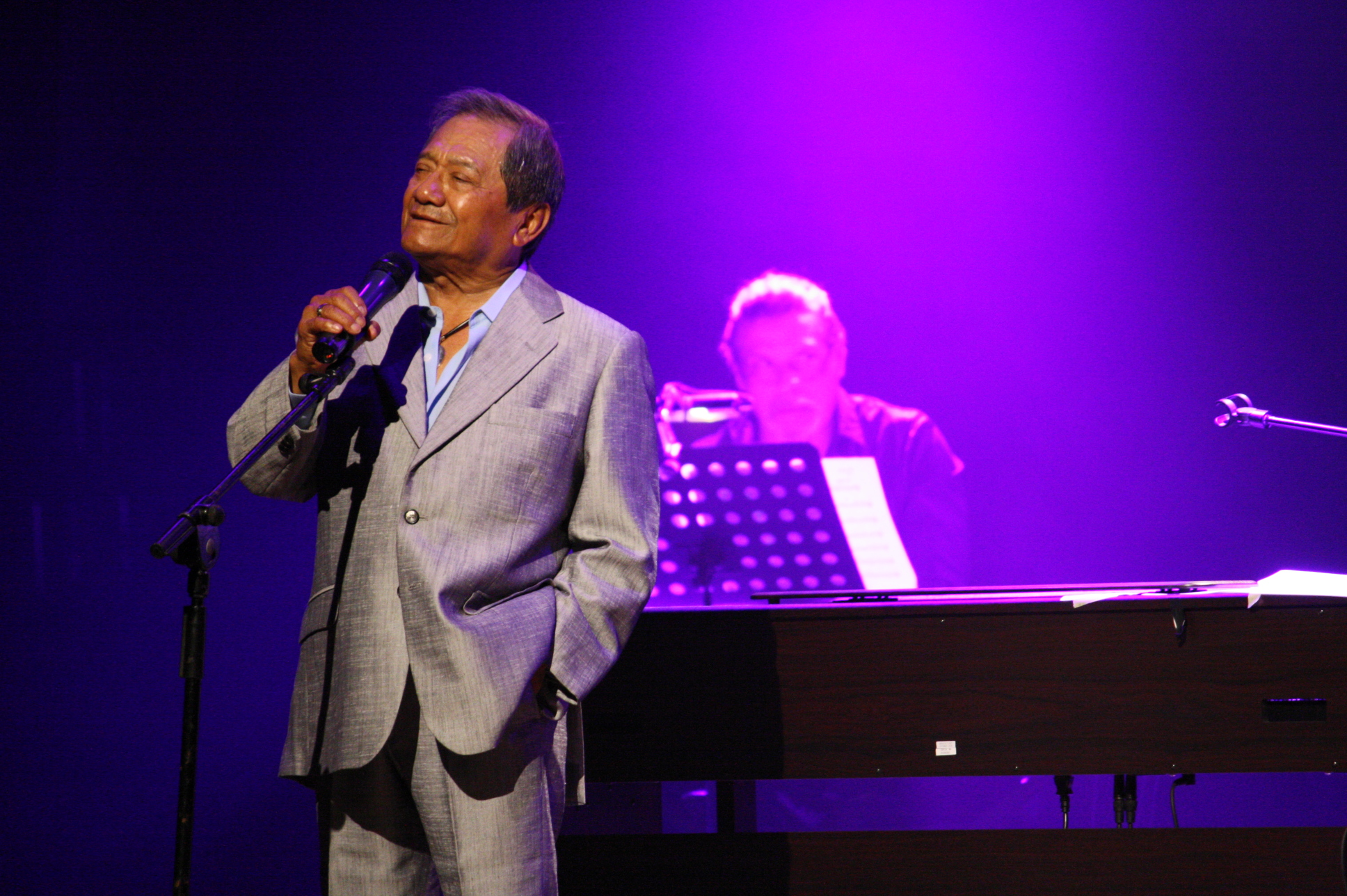
When Miguel decided to record boleros for his next album, WEA Latina hired Mexican singer-songwriter Armando Manzanero (pictured) to help with their production. Romance has covers of two Manzanero compositions: "Te Extraño" and "No Sé Tú".

Since Miguel signed with WEA Latina in 1986, his albums Soy Como Quiero Ser (1987), Busca una Mujer (1988), and 20 Años (1990) have sold over three million copies cumulatively in Mexico. His early recordings consisted of soft rock and pop ballad tunes, which led to Miguel becoming a teen idol. On 14 January 1991, WEA Latina announced a new album with longtime producer and composer Juan Carlos Calderón, who produced the three previous records by Miguel. Wanting to replicate the success of 20 Años, Calderón would compose pop songs and ballads and find tracks for Miguel to cover in Spanish. Production was scheduled to begin in April, with Italian- and English-language studio albums to follow. The record label was unconvinced by Calderón's pre-selected songs; he had to write more compositions, and production halted indefinitely. Ultimately, he was unable to compose songs for the album.

Miguel had a contractual deadline with his label to record new material, and considered recording boleros (slow ballads "endowed with romantic lyrics") after meeting Mexican singer-songwriter Armando Manzanero during a televised interview. The singer had performed boleros (including compositions recorded by Manzanero) during his 1991 tour. At the suggestion of manager Hugo López, and realizing that he could appeal to an older audience, Miguel chose boleros for his next album and WEA Latina hired Manzanero to take over its production. Manzanero was enthusiastic, hoping that Miguel's popularity would introduce the genre to young listeners. On 25 October 1991, the album's title was announced as a homage to boleros; it was Miguel's first as a producer.

Recording began on 24 August 1991, at Ocean Way Recording in Hollywood, California. Miguel and Manzanero produced the album, with Bebu Silvetti arranging the strings with additional contributions from 32 violinists under the direction of American conductor Ezra Kliger. On Romance Miguel covers twelve boleros (with each track being described as love numbers), which were selected by Manzanero from five hundred songs including his "Te Extraño" and "No Sé Tú". Seven of the twelve tracks were recorded by 13 September when production was suspended the following day when Miguel was hospitalized with appendicitis. The album's planned late-October release was postponed until 19 November and recording resumed two weeks after Miguel was hospitalized.

== Singles and promotion ==
Luis Miguel "No Sé Tú"
A 23-second sample of Miguel's cover of Armando Manzanero's 1986 "No Sé Tú", which contains parts of the chorus and features string arrangements by Bebu Silvetti. Danyel Smith of Vibe magazine writes: "Backed by a full orchestra, his voice rises, falls and penetrates, making us wish we'd been there la otra vez".

"Inolvidable" was released as Romance's lead single in November 1991. It reached number one on the Billboard Hot Latin Songs chart in the United States the week of 25 January 1992, topping the chart for five weeks. Its second single, "No Sé Tú", was released in February 1992 and reached number one on the Hot Latin Songs chart the week of 18 April, topping the chart for seven weeks. The music video for "No Sé Tú" was directed by Pedro Torres and filmed in Miami, it features Miguel and an orchestra performing in front of a building. The video premiered on 16 February on the Mexican variety show Siempre en Domingo. "Inolvidable" and "No Sé Tú" ended 1992 as the third- and second-best-performing Latin songs of the year, respectively, in the United States. In Mexico, the songs topped the charts for a total of six months. The album's third single, "Contigo en la Distancia", was released in Mexico in July 1992, where it peaked at number six on the ballad chart. Its music video was also directed by Torres and filmed in Miami. "Mucho Corazón" peaked at number three on the Hot Latin Songs chart, with "Cómo" peaking at number four. "Usted" and "La Barca" received airplay throughout Latin America.

To promote the record, Miguel began his Romance Tour on 26 June 1992 at a sold out 10,000-seat National Auditorium in Mexico City. After performing throughout Latin America and the United States, he concluded the tour in Chile in December. In addition to touring, Miguel performed at the Seville Expo '92 in Spain. His set list consisted primarily of songs from his earlier career and boleros from Romance. In October 1992 WEA Latina released América & En Vivo, a live EP featuring a new track ("America, America") and tour recordings of "Contigo en la Distancia", "No Sé Tú" and "Inolvidable". AllMusic gave the EP three stars out of five.

== Critical reception ==
Professional ratings
Review scores
Source	Rating
AllMusic	3/5 stars
Chicago Tribune	4/4 stars

AllMusic editor Janet Rosen gave Romance three stars out of five, saying that it "features the usual smooth, well-crafted pop ear candy from Luis Miguel, earnestly sung over strings and polite Latin rhythms". However, she noted that the songs in the album booklet and the lack of liner notes made it difficult for listeners to know what "to make of this presentation". Rosen concluded, "It doesn't matter—the title of the release says it all." Achy Obejas of the Chicago Tribune gave the record four stars out of four, praising Miguel's refusal "to get campy, which gives the effort far more integrity than might have been imagined" and calling his take on boleros "vibrant and real."

Mark Holston reviewed the album positively in the magazine Américas, praising Miguel's vocals, the choice of songs and Silvetti's arrangements: "Romance is a reminder of the enduring quality of timeless music". Sun-Sentinel critic John Lannert called Romance a "superb collection of updated classics" and complimented the artist for staying "fairly close to the string-laden original versions". Gloria Calzada of El Informador described the album as "a beauty with twelve songs", stating, "the songs I liked the most were the ones that the masterful Armando Manzanero made".

=== Accolades ===
At the 1992 Billboard Music Awards Miguel was the Top Pop Latin Artist and the Top Hot Latin Tracks Artist, and Romance was the Top Pop Latin Album. In Chile, Romance won the Laurel de Oro Award for best album of the year. The singer was the Best Artist From a Non-English-Speaking Country at the Korean International Music Awards. At the 1993 Grammy Awards, Romance was nominated for Best Latin Pop Album, which was awarded to Jon Secada for his album Otro Día Más Sin Verte. That year Romance was also nominated for Pop Album of the Year at the Lo Nuestro Awards, again losing to Secada for his self-titled album. At the 1993 annual Premios Eres, Miguel won three awards: Best Album, Best Male Singer and Best Show (for his tour). The record was the Best International Album and Miguel won the Best International Artist of the Year at the 1993 Ronda de Venezuela awards.

== Commercial performance ==
Romance was released internationally on 19 November 1991, and sold over 400,000 copies in its first 10 days. In Mexico it was certified octuple platinum by the Asociación Mexicana de Productores de Fonogramas y Videogramas (AMPROFON) for shipping two million copies, the album was also the best selling album in the country in 1992 with 1,623,000 copies sold. In the United States, Romance debuted at number ten on the Billboard Latin Pop Albums chart for the week of 14 December 1991, and reached number one four weeks later. The record topped the chart for 16 consecutive weeks when it was displaced by Jon Secada's eponymous album on the week of 22 August 1992, ending 1992 and 1993 as the bestselling Latin pop album of the year in the country. It was the first record by a Spanish-speaking artist to be certified gold in Brazil and Taiwan, and the first gold certification by a non-crossover Latin artist in the United States (later certified platinum in the U.S. by the RIAA for shipments of one million copies). In South America, Romance was certified platinum in Colombia and Venezuela, gold in Paraguay and triple platinum in Peru. In Argentina was the best selling album of 1992 with 411,502 copies sold, and eventually was certified 16× platinum for sales of over one million copies, the bestselling record by a non-Argentine artist. It received a diamond award from the Argentine Chamber of Phonograms and Videograms Producers (CAPIF), and was certified diamond in Chile and double platinum in Spain. Romance had sold over eight million copies worldwide and is Miguel's bestselling record.

== Influence and legacy ==
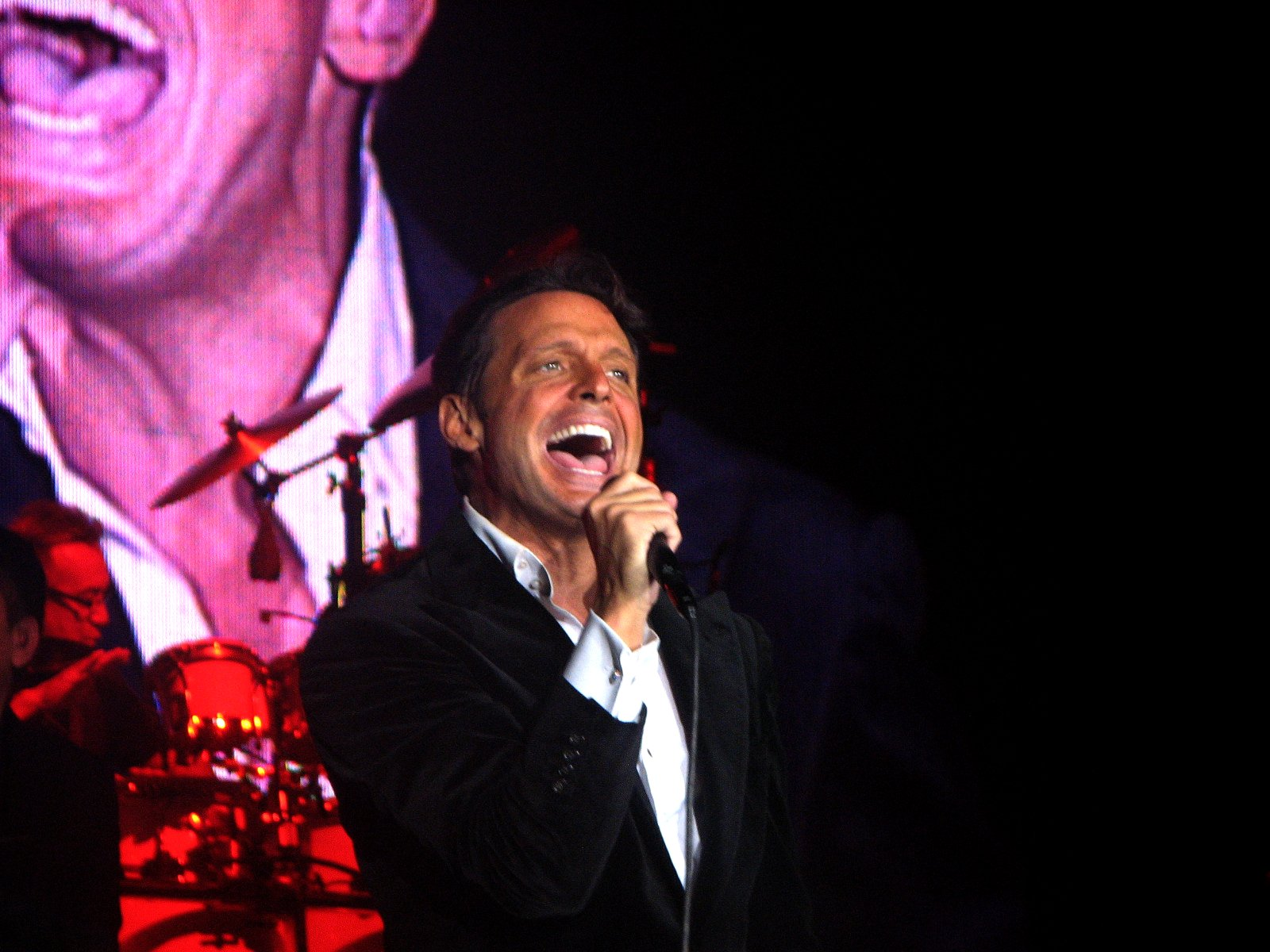
Luis Miguel's recording of Romance was attributed by music critics for reviving interest in bolero music.

Romance was credited by music critics to have renewed mainstream interest in bolero music. According to Chicago Tribune editor Monica Eng, "Just as Harry Connick, Jr. re-popularized the sounds of Sinatra and Tony Bennett, Mexican platinum-selling heartthrob Luis Miguel brought back an appreciation for the music of Mexico's boleristas." In The Wall Street Journal, Mary Talbot compared renewed interest in boleros to the revival of big band and swing music in the Anglo-American market, previously dominated by rock music (which had seized bolero's popularity during the 1960s). Elena Kellner of the Los Angeles Times noted the album's "introducing old favorites to younger audiences" while Achy Obejas of the Chicago Tribune documented Miguel's popularity with older listeners. In Latin Beat Magazine, Franz Reynold wrote that before Miguel, boleros were considered by young people the "music of the ancients, something to be feared, since it seemed to signal the advent of senility". Mark Holston wrote in Américas magazine that the record's "irresistible combination of classic songs, string-laden arrangements, and subtle contemporary influences proved to be the perfect formula to reawaken the bolero's slumbering passions once again."

In his book, The Latin Beat: The Rhythms And Roots Of Latin Music From Bossa Nova To Salsa And Beyond, Ed Morales wrote that Miguel's collaboration with Manzanero "brought light to an overlooked master of [bolero]" and "was a significant update of the genre". Romance enhanced Silvetti's reputation as an arranger and producer; according to Leila Cobo of Billboard, the album "categorically redefined the interpretations of traditional boleros" and "sparked a torrent of work for Silvetti, including records with Vic Damone and Engelbert Humperdinck". His arrangements became known as the "Silvetti Sound", which Cobo described as "anchored in sweeping melodies, lush string arrangements, acoustic instrumentation, and above all, unabashed romanticism". Romance's success encouraged Linda Ronstadt, José Luis Rodríguez and Plácido Domingo to record modern versions of traditional boleros. According to Miguel's former manager Mauricio Abaroa, although boleros were still recorded by traditional musicians at the time, "what made Luis Miguel so successful was that it was a young man singing them and that he sang them like modern ballads". During the Billboard Hot Latin Songs Chart's 25th anniversary in 2011, Miguel was number one on the Hot Latin Songs Top Artists chart. Manzanero reflected on their partnership, saying that he "put in the mouths of his generation all of the great romantic songs that had a 30-year history". In 2015, Billboard listed Romance as one of the Essential Latin Albums of Past 50 Years, an editor writes: "What's become so formulaic in Latin music these days – the tribute album by a contemporary artist honoring a genius of another era – started with Romance".

The album's success encouraged Miguel to record three more Romance records. Its follow-up, Segundo Romance, was released in 1994; Manzanero, Calderón and Kiko Cibrian co-produced with Miguel, and it won a Grammy Award for Best Latin Pop Performance. In 1997 Romances was released, with Miguel and Manzanero co-producing Silvetti's arrangements; it sold over 4.5 million copies, winning another Grammy for Best Latin Pop Performance. A year later WEA Latina released Todos Los Romances, a three-disc compilation of the romance-themed records. The fourth record in the series, Mis Romances (produced by Miguel), was released in 2001. Although the singer had planned a ten-album series, Mis Romances was critically and commercially unsuccessful. The following year saw the release of Mis Boleros Favoritos, with 13 previously recorded tracks from the Romance series and a new version of "Hasta Que Vuelvas". According to AllMusic editor Iván Adaime, the record's purpose was to "close this era" of the Romance series. In 2012, Warner Music Latina reissued a commemorative Romance: 20th Anniversary set with a CD, the original LP record and three 45 rpm singles: "Inolvidable", "No Sé Tú" and "Contigo en la Distancia".

== Track listing ==
No.	Title	Writer(s)	Year of composition	Length
1.	"No Me Platiques Más (Don't Say Any More)"	Vicente Garrido	1954	3:31
2.	"Inolvidable (Unforgettable)"	Julio Gutiérrez	1944	4:16
3.	"La Puerta (The Door)"	Luis Demetrio	1958	3:19
4.	"La Barca (The Boat)"	Roberto Cantoral	1957	3:28
5.	"Te Extraño (I Miss You)"	Armando Manzanero	1968	4:23
6.	"Usted (You)"	Gabriel Ruiz; Monis Zorrilla	1951	3:43
7.	"Contigo en la Distancia (With You in the Distance)"	César Portillo de la Luz	1952	3:23
8.	"Mucho Corazón (A Lot of Heart)"	Ema Elena Valdelamar	1953	3:23
9.	"La Mentira (The Lie)"	Álvaro Carrillo	1965	3:46
10.	"Cuando Vuelva a Tu Lado (When I Return to Your Side)"	María Grever	1961	3:48
11.	"No Sé Tú (I Don't Know About You)"	Manzanero	1986	3:50
12.	"Cómo (How)"	Chico Novarro	1967	3:14

== Personnel ==
The following credits are from AllMusic and from the Romance liner notes:

=== Performance credits ===
- Carlos Vega – Drums
- Abraham Laboriel – Bass
- Bebu Silvetti – Arranger, director, piano, synthesizer, co-producer
- Grant Geissman – Guitar
- Luis Conte – Percussion
- Pedro Flores – Vihuela ("Mucho Corazón")
- Benjamin Correa – Requinto ("La Barca", "Mucho Corazón")
- Charlie Davis – Trumpet
- Ramon Flores – Trumpet
- Alan Kaplan – Trombone
- Robert Payne – Trombone
- Joseph Meyer – French horn
- Calvin Smith – French horn
- Don Markese – Alto saxophone ("Inolvidable")
- Justo Almario – tenor saxophone, alto saxophone solo ("No Me Platiques Más")
- Peter Scott – Oboe solo ("No Sé Tú", "Contigo en la Distancia")
- Ezra Kliger – Coordination, director, production coordination, string arrangement
- Luis Miguel – producer, vocals

=== Technical credits ===
- Ken Allardyce – Assistant engineer
- Kenneth Barzilai – Photography
- Gustavo Borner – Keyboard programming
- J. Vicente Diosdado – Graphic design
- Benny Faccone – Engineer, mixing
- Bernie Grundman – Mastering
- Steve Holrayde – Assistant engineer
- Armando Manzanero – producer

== Charts ==
=== Weekly charts ===
Weekly chart performance for Romance
Chart (1992–95)	Peak position
Argentine Albums (CAPIF)	1
Brazilian Albums (Nopem)	3
Chilean Albums (IFPI)	5
European Albums (Music & Media)	85
Spanish Albums (PROMUSICAE)	7
US Latin Pop Albums (Billboard)	1
US Top Latin Albums (Billboard)	3
Chart (2025)	Peak position
US Latin Pop Albums (Billboard)	9

=== All-time charts ===
All-time chart performance for Romance
Chart (1985–1994)	Position
US Latin Pop Albums (Billboard)	1

=== Year-end charts ===
Year-end chart performance for Romance
Chart (1992)	Position
Argentine Albums (CAPIF)	1
Brazilian Albums (Nopem)	48
Mexican Albums (AMPROFON)	1
US Latin Pop Albums (Billboard)	1

Chart (1993)	Position
US Latin Pop Albums (Billboard)	1

Chart (1994)	Position
US Latin Pop Albums (Billboard)	5
US Top Latin Albums (Billboard)	8

Chart (1995)	Position
US Latin Pop Albums (Billboard)	6
US Top Latin Albums (Billboard)	15

Chart (1996)	Position
US Top Latin Albums (Billboard)	24

Chart (1997)	Position
US Top Latin Catalog Albums (Billboard)	8

== Certifications and sales ==
Region	Certification	Certified units/sales
Argentina (CAPIF)	Diamond	1,354,795
Brazil (Pro-Música Brasil)	Gold	500,000
Chile	4× Platinum	500,000
Colombia	Platinum	70,000
Mexico (AMPROFON)	8× Platinum	3,000,000
Paraguay	Gold	
Peru	3× Platinum	60,000
Spain (Promusicae)	2× Platinum	200,000^{^}
Taiwan (RIT)	Gold	50,000
United States (RIAA)	Platinum	1,000,000^{^}
Uruguay (CUD)	4× Platinum	24,000^{^}
Venezuela	Platinum	100,000
Summaries
Orient	—	500,000
Worldwide Worldwide sales up to 1995	—	8,000,000
^{^} Shipments figures based on certification alone.

== See also ==
- 1991 in Latin music
- List of best-selling albums by country
- List of best-selling albums in Argentina
- List of best-selling albums in Brazil
- List of best-selling albums in Chile
- List of best-selling albums in Mexico
- List of best-selling Latin albums
- List of number-one Billboard Latin Pop Albums from the 1990s
