= Minha Música =

Studio album by Menudo
- Released: 1986
- Studio: Ochoa Recording Studio
- Genre: Pop
- Label: Philips

Menudo chronology
Minha Música (1986)	Una y Otra Vez (1986)

Minha Música is a studio album by Puerto Rican singer Ray Reyes, a former member of the boy band Menudo, released in 1986 by the label Philips. The album blends musical elements reminiscent of his time with the group with original compositions, including seven songs by Brazilian songwriters and three by Puerto Ricans, such as the self-penned track "Quero." During his transition to a solo career, Ray performed in Brazil, solidifying his new artistic phase with a repertoire that mixed original songs and Menudo hits. Critical reception was mixed: while some praised his musical maturity, others pointed out technical flaws in the album.

Ray developed a strong connection with the Brazilian audience, appearing on numerous television shows and praising the country's warm welcome, though he admitted difficulties due to being far from his family in Puerto Rico. Despite the challenges, his Brazilian tour extended into 1987, with performances marked by enthusiastic crowds. Although he did not materialize projects like the telenovela O Ídolo on SBT, his dedication to the Brazilian music scene demonstrated an effort to redefine his artistic identity, even in the face of negative criticism from some experts.

== Background and context ==
Ray Reyes left the Puerto Rican group Menudo in 1985 at age 16, following the band's common practice of replacing members as they aged. He was replaced by Ramon, who had been selected six months before Ray's official departure in June of that year. Despite already being distanced from the group, Ray continued fulfilling international commitments while Puerto Rican fans bid him farewell in a series of five shows held in San Juan. His departure marked the end of an era in which he was considered Menudo's most beloved member.

From the beginning of his Menudo career, Ray was accompanied by a psychologist to help him cope with fan harassment and the transition to a quiet life after leaving the group. In interviews, the singer expressed his desire to resume his studies, with interests in fields like aerospace engineering, theater, or even pursuing a solo career. About his future, Ray commented: "Well, initially, the plans are a bit unclear. I want to focus on my studies, maybe pursue a solo career or study theater. I can’t say for sure yet." His exit caused great emotion among fans, reflected in the sold-out special edition of the magazine Contigo! Superstar, published by Editora Abril, dedicated exclusively to Menudo.

In 1985, some Brazilian media outlets even confirmed that the singer would star in a telenovela on SBT. The telenovela, titled O Ídolo (The Idol), would be written specifically for the singer, replacing Uma Esperança no Ar. The episodes would be directed by Chico de Assis and Ana Maria Diaz, telling the story of a poor boy who becomes a famous singer, allowing Ray to perform songs throughout the plot. However, the project did not materialize, as his manager, Hélio Nascimento, stated: "Ray is a singer with a career that’s just starting; other activities, like acting, could interfere with his work on the album... In the future, this is a possibility we might consider."

== Production and recording ==
The album was recorded in Puerto Rico and features seven songs by Brazilian composers, such as César Rossini and Dom Bento, and three by Puerto Ricans, including a collaboration with Ruco Gandia titled "Quero." According to the singer, the song came about spontaneously while he was in Brazil: "It was kind of crazy. I was with Ruco—a Puerto Rican friend who’s part of my band—in Campinas, and I felt inspired. I showed it to him and asked what he thought. He liked it, and we worked on it together. The song has a beautiful message, saying no to war and hunger, and it’s about everything I want to express."

In interviews, Ray revealed that his new musical project sought to blend elements from his Menudo days with original compositions, creating a distinct identity reflecting his transition to an independent artist. "I’m trying to mix things I did in Menudo with something new. I want something that feels like me but also connects with what the audience already knows and loves about me," he said.

== Release and promotion ==
Before the album's release, the singer performed a series of concerts in Brazil, touring twelve of the country’s largest cities. His official solo debut took place at the Clube de Regatas Santista in Santos. The show’s setlist included original songs co-written with Ruco, as well as Brazilian hits like "Dona" by Sá e Guarabyra and "Volta Pra Mim" by Roupa Nova. Before the first show, Ray revealed in an interview: "[The show] includes not just new songs but also some Menudo hits that were popular here and that I love to sing. I’m trying to build something that’s a bit of everything but with my own identity." He added that Brazil had been a source of inspiration and learning for his new phase and that he hoped to meet fans' expectations: "I’m really excited about the show at Clube de Regatas Santista because I know the audience here is passionate and full of energy. I hope it’s as thrilling for them as it will be for me."

The show was well-received, with critics noting the artist’s growth. According to J. M de Sampaio Neto of Cidade de Santos journal, the song "Quero" was a highlight, showcasing Ray’s maturity with its strong, modern rhythm. Sampaio noted that even when singing three Menudo tracks ("Quiero ser" from Quiero Ser (1981), "Si tú no estás" from A Todo Rock (1983), and "Persecución" from Evolución (1984)), his performance bore little resemblance to the innocent boy from that era. The tour included shows scheduled through 1987.

In Brazil, the singer appeared on various TV shows. On SBT, he performed on Viva a Noite, singing "Só Um Dia e Nada Mais" and "Com a Cabeça no Ar." At the time, he had been living in Brazil for four months, rehearsing with his band and recording Minha Música, as he told host Gugu Liberato. On Show de Calouros, he sang "Com a Cabeça no Ar" and answered questions from the judges. On Show Maravilha, he performed "Eu Fiquei Sem Jeito" and was interviewed by host Mara Maravilha. On TV Gazeta, he appeared on Brincando na Paulista, singing "Alegria de Sonhar" and "A Primeira Vez," and was interviewed by clowns Atchim & Espirro. On Band, he participated in Batalha 85, performing "Com a Cabeça no Ar" and "Só um Dia e Nada Mais," and was interviewed by Serginho Caffe on Super Special.

When asked about the challenges of living in Brazil to promote his work, Ray admitted that being away from his family in Puerto Rico was difficult but said he was making the most of the experience. "Honestly, I’m not fully settled here yet. I’ve been going back to Puerto Rico a lot to visit my family and work on my second album. But I’m adapting and loving the experience of living in such a welcoming place," he said at the time.

== Critical reception ==
Regarding music critics’ reviews, Edgar Augusto of Diário do Pará gave a negative assessment, stating that the album highlighted the singer’s shortcomings: "He sings poorly, doesn’t know how to choose keys that mask his flaws, and carries a repertoire even the Menudos would hesitate to claim." He also criticized the album’s technical aspects, saying the sound recording was subpar.

== Track listing ==
No.	Title	Writer(s)	Length
1.	"Uma Noite no Hawaí"	Cezar Rossini, Gil Gerson	3:18
2.	"Só um Dia e Nada Mais"	Cezar Rossini, Gil Gerson	3:54
3.	"Fui Lembrar de Você"	André Christovam	3:32
4.	"Tenerte cerca"	Ruco Gandia	5:06
5.	"Quero"	Ruco Gandia, Ray	4:32
6.	"Alegria de Sonhar"	Dom Beto, Brenda	3:25
7.	"A Primeira Vez"	Dom Beto, Brenda	4:25
8.	"Lua Cheia de Desejo"	Cezar Rossini, Paulo Flexa	3:50
9.	"Eu Fiquei Sem Jeito"	Wilkins	5:29
10.	"Com a Cabeça no Ar"	Luiz Cláudio, Tony	4:08
Total length:			42:39

== Personnel ==
Information adapted from the back cover of the 1986 LP Minha Música.

- Recorded at: Puerto Rico – Ochoa Recording Studio
- Producer: Rudo Gandia
- Arrangements: Rudo Gandia and Mario Tesoni Jr.
- Recording Engineer: Ronnie
- Photography & Direction: Beto Napole and Rogério Soares
- Artwork: Via Brasil Publicidade e Promoções Ltda.
- General Direction: Editora Musical Via Brasil Ltda.
- Assembly: Ricardo Pereira (Polygram)
- Mastering: Américo (Polygram)
- Graphic Coordination: Jorge Vianna
