= Una y Otra Vez =

Una y Otra Vez may refer to:

- Una y Otra Vez (Sergent Garcia album), 2011
- Una y Otra Vez (Ray Reyes album), 1986
- Una y Otra Vez, a 2010 Colombian film
- "Una y Otra Vez", a song by Marlango and Guille Galván that serves as the theme song for ANA. all in, 2021
- "Una y Otra Vez", a song by Antonio Orozco, 2005
- "Una y Otra Vez", a song by Ednita Nazario from Apasionada, 2005
- "Una y Otra Vez", a song by El Tri from Hecho en México, 2005
- "Una y Otra Vez", a song by Jesse & Joy from Electricidad, 2009
- "Una y Otra Vez", the working title for "Una Na" by Lali Espósito, 2017
- "Una y Otra Vez", a song by Magento, 2001
- "Una y Otra Vez", a song by María León written for the telenovela Guerra de ídolos, 2017
- "Una y Otra Vez", a song by Rombai, 2017
- "Una y Otra Vez", a song by Santiago Cruz and Morat, 2019
- "Una y Otra Vez", a song by Yolandita Monge from Mala, 2008
