= América & en Vivo =

EP by Luis Miguel
- Released: 25 September 1992
- Recorded: 1992
- Venues: National Auditorium (Mexico City, Mexico)
- Studios: Ground Control (Los Angeles California); Sound Shop (Nashville, Tennessee); Woodland (Nashville, Tennessee)
- Genres: Bolero; Latin pop
- Length: 16:57
- Language: Spanish
- Label: WEA Latina
- Producers: Humberto Gatica; Mauricio Abaroa

Luis Miguel chronology
Romance (1991)	América & en Vivo (1992)	Aries (1993)

Singles from América & En Vivo
- 1. "America, America" Released: 1992

América & en Vivo is a live extended play (EP) by Mexican singer Luis Miguel. It was released on 25 September 1992 by WEA Latina. The EP consists of three live versions of "Inolvidable", No Sé Tú", and "Contigo en la Distancia" from his performance at the National Auditorium in Mexico during his Romance Tour on June 26, 1992, as well as a new track "America, America", originally performed by Nino Bravo. "America, America" was released as a single and peaked at number 20 on the Billboard Hot Latin Songs chart. The EP was rated three out of five stars by an editor on AllMusic and received a positive review from Mario Taradell of the Miami Herald, who praised his vocals and the production of the EP. América & En Vivo peaked at number 12 on the Billboard Latin Pop Albums chart and was certified platinum in Argentina by the Argentine Chamber of Phonograms and Videograms Producers (CAPIF).

== Background and content ==
In 1991 Miguel released his eighth studio album, Romance, a collection of classic boleros, the oldest of which originated in the 1940s. The album, which was produced by Armando Manzanero and arranged by Bebu Silvetti, was a success in Latin America and sold over seven million copies worldwide. It revived interest in the bolero genre and was the first record by a Spanish-speaking artist to be certified gold in Brazil, Taiwan, and the United States. Luis Miguel promoted the album by launching the Romance Tour in 1992. As part of the tour, Luis Miguel performed at a sold-out show on 26 June 1992 at the National Auditorium in Mexico City.

Luis Miguel "America, America"
A 27-second sample of "America, America", which features a verse sung English. Mario Taradell of the Miami Herald noted the English verse "coats the tune with a multicultural feel".

América & En Vivo features the live versions of "Inolvidable", "No Sé Tú", and "Contigo en la Distancia" from Miguel's performance at the National Auditorium. The three songs were also promotional singles for Romance. In addition, the EP features a new track "America, America" composed by José Luis Armenteros and Pablo Herrero. The song was originally performed by Spanish singer Nino Bravo on his album ...y volumen 5 (1973). Miguel dedicated the song to the soldiers who participated in the Gulf War.

== Reception ==
América & En Vivo was released on 25 September 1992. It sold 95,000 copies in Mexico on the first week of release. The EP peaked at number 12 on the Billboard Latin Pop Albums chart. It was certified platinum in Argentina by the CAPIF for sales of 60,000 copies. "America, America" was released, peaking at number 20 on the Billboard Hot Latin Songs chart and number one on the Mexican ballads chart. The music video for "America, America" was filmed across several locations in the United States and Puerto Rico. The music video won the award for MTV International at the 1993 MTV Video Music Awards and received a nomination for Video of the Year at the 5th Annual Lo Nuestro Awards in the same year.

An editor for AllMusic rated the EP three stars out of five. An editor writing for Billboard magazine complimented the EP stating that it "should add another trophy to the already impressive collection amassed by this 22 year-old Mexican crooner". Mario Taradell of the Miami Herald gave the EP a positive review; he compared "America, America" to Neil Diamond's song "America" stating it is "filled with land-of-hope lyrics, heavily orchestrated production and a big, inspirational chorus". On the live tracks, he felt that Miguel is "in fine voice and a playful mood" and noted that "Inolvidable" was "more percussive and danceable than the album version" and commented that "Contigo en la Distancia" and "No Sé Tú" "showcase Miguel's romantic croon".

== Track listing ==
- The track listing is adapted from AllMusic.

No.	Title	Writer(s)	Length
1.	"América, América"	José Luis Armenteros; Pablo Herrero	4:33
2.	"Contigo en la Distancia"	César Portillo de la Luz	3:31
3.	"No Sé Tú"	Armando Manzanero	4:09
4.	"Inolvidable"	Julio Gutiérrez	4:40

== Credits and personnel ==
The following credits are from AllMusic:

=== Performance credits ===
- Luis Miguel - lead vocal

==== America, America ====
- Claude Gaudette - keyboards, synthesizer bass, drum programming, synth programming, arrangements
- Michael Thompson - lead guitar
- Michael Landau - electric guitar
- Tim Pierce - acoustic guitar
- Simon Franglen - synclavier programming

==== En Vivo ====
- Juan Carlos Toribio - piano, keyboards, musical director
- Ignacio "Kiko" Cibrian – guitars
- Arturo Perez – keyboards
- Rodolfo Machorro – bass guitar
- Fernando Caballero - drums
- Alfredo Algarin – percussion, background vocals
- Jeff Nathanson - saxophone
- Jose Villar, Juan Manuel Arpero - trumpet
- Orquesta De Camara De La Ciudad De Mexico - strings
- Bob Bailey, Christina Abaroa, Eva Ma. Bojalil, Francis Benítez, Dan Navarro, Donna McElroy, Isela Sotelo, Kim Fleming, Lionel Hampton, Leyla Hoyle, Maria del Rey, Patricia Tanus – background vocals

=== Technical credits ===
- Humberto Gatica – engineer, mixing, producer (1)
- Mauricio Abaroa – producer (2-4)
- Felipe Elgueta;– assistant producer (2-4)
- Alfredo Gatica - coordination (2-4)
- Carlos Villar, Humberto Terán – technical coordination (2-4)
- Benny Faccone – engineer, mixing (2-4)
- Alejandro Rodriguez, Robert Tassi, Salvador Tercero – engineer (2-4)
- Bernie Grundman - mastering (2-4)
- Juan White - recording assistant (2-4)
- Antonio Jimenez, Joel Robles, Manuel Lopez, Raul Durand – assistant (2-4)
- Ivan Manjarrez – photography

== Charts ==
Chart (1992)	Peak position
US Latin Pop Albums (Billboard)	12

Chart (1993)	Peak position
US Top Latin Albums (Billboard)	30

== Certifications and sales ==
Region	Certification	Certified units/sales
Argentina (CAPIF)	Platinum	60,000^{^}
Mexico First-week sales	—	95,000
^{^} Shipments figures based on certification alone.

== See also ==
- 1992 in Latin music
