= No Sé Tú =

1986 song written and composed by Armando Manzanero

Promotional single by Armando Manzanero

from the album Cariñosamente
- Language: Spanish
- B-side: "Otra Vez"
- Published: 1986
- Released: 1986
- Length: 3:07
- Label: CBS
- Songwriter: Armando Manzanero

"No Sé Tú" (transl. "I Don't Know About You") is a song written and performed by Mexican singer-songwriter Armando Manzanero, released from his studio album, Cariñosamente (1986). A popular bolero song, the lyrics describe the protagonist unable to stop thinking about his lover. Manzanero re-recorded "No Sé Tú" as a duet with Francisco Céspedes on Manzanero's album Duetos (2000). It was listed among Manzanero's best songs by an editor for BBC Mundo.

A cover of the song by Mexican singer Luis Miguel was released as the second single from his eighth studio album, Romance (1991). Miguel co-produced his rendition along with Manzanero, with string arrangements being composed by Bebu Silvetti. The music video for Miguel's cover was directed by Pedro Torres, filmed in Miami, and features the artist performing in front of an orchestra. It won the Eres award for Video of the Year.

Retrospectively, his rendition received favorable reviews from music critics who listed it among the artist's best songs. At the 1993 Lo Nuestro Awards, "No Sé Tú" won Pop Song of the Year while Manzanero received the American Society of Composers, Authors and Publishers (ASCAP) Latin Award for the same category.

== Background and composition ==
In 1986, Manzanero released Cariñosamente, an album of new arrangements of songs he had previously composed as well as two original compositions written by Manzanero ("No Sé Tú" and "Otra Vez"). The former is a bolero that tells of a man "who can't stop thinking about the love of his life". "No Sé Tú" was released as a promotional single from the album. Manzanero performed an instrumental version of the song on the piano for his studio album, El Piano, Armando Manzanero, y sus amigos (1995). According to La Verdad's Paola Alejandra Parra, while Manzanero has written songs based on his life, it is not known to whom "No Sé Tú" was dedicated.

He later re-recorded "No Sé Tú" as a duet with Francisco Céspedes on Manazero's album Duetos (2000). He also performed the song with fellow Mexican singer Susana Zabaleta on their live album De la A a la Z (2006). "No Sé Tú" ranked number three on BBC Mundo's "Armando Manzanero 10 Songs That We Love the Most". As part of Billboard's tribute to the artist, who was presented with the Lifetime Achievement Award in 2020, Joy Huerta of Jesse & Joy performed the song live with Manzanero playing on the piano. Following Manzanero's death, Huerta recorded her own rendition of the track and was featured as the closing theme for the Mexican telenovela Fuego ardiente (2021).

== Luis Miguel version ==
"No Sé Tú"

Single by Luis Miguel

from the album Romance
- Released: February 1992
- Studio: Ocean Way Recording (Hollywood, California)
- Genre: Bolero
- Length: 3:48
- Label: WEA Latina
- Songwriter: Armando Manzanero
- Producers: Manzanero; Luis Miguel

Luis Miguel singles chronology
"Inolvidable" (1991)	"No Sé Tú" (1992)	"Contigo en la Distancia" (1992)

Music video
- "No Sé Tú" on YouTube

"No Sé Tú"
A 23-second sample of Miguel's cover of Armando Manzanero's 1986 "No Sé Tú", which contains parts of the chorus and features string arrangements by Bebu Silvetti.

In 1991, Mexican singer Luis Miguel covered "No Sé Tú" on his eighth studio album, Romance, a collection of boleros performed by the artist. Released as the album's second single in February 1992 by WEA Latina, it is one of two songs by Manzanero that Miguel covered in the album, along with "Te Extraño", as selected from among 500 others.

As with the rest of the album's tracks, it was co-produced by Manzanero and Miguel, with Bebu Silvetti arranging the strings. Recording took place at the Ocean Way Recording in Hollywood, California. The song was later included on his compilation albums Mis Boleros Favoritos (2002) and Grandes Éxitos (2005). A live version of the song was featured on his live albums and as part of the "Romance Medley" on Vivo (2000).

=== Reception ===
Retrospectively, music critics commended "No Sé Tú" as one of Miguel's best songs. The track was listed among "10 Luis Miguel Songs You Should Know" by Emily Paulín on Sonica and "20 Best Luis Miguel Songs to Listen on YouTube Music" by an editor for El Comercio. Danyel Smith of Vibe magazine listed it as among the 99 best love songs of the and wrote: "Backed by a full orchestra, his voice rises, falls and penetrates, making us wish we'd been there la otra vez". The Classic Rock editor ranked "No Sé Tú" as Miguel's third best song of all-time by complimented it as "another satisfying ballad" and praised its "exquisite" musical arrangements. Cindy Carcamo of the Orange County Register called it "beautifully written". Commercially, it topped the Billboard Hot Latin Songs in the United States, where it spent seven weeks at this position. It ended 1992 as the second best-performing Latin song of the year. In Mexico, both "No Sé Tú" and "Inovidable" topped the charts for a total of six months.

=== Music video ===
An accompanying music video for "No Sé Tú" was directed by Pedro Torres and filmed in Miami; it features Miguel and an orchestra performing in front of a building. The video premiered on 16 February on the Mexican variety show Siempre en Domingo. At the 1993 annual Premios Eres, it won Best Video.

=== Accolades ===
At the 5th Annual Lo Nuestro Awards in 1993, "No Sé Tú" won Pop Song of the Year. At the inaugural ASCAP Latin Awards in the same year, Manzanero won Pop Song of the Year for the track in a tie with Ana Gabriel's song "Evidencias". In 2002, "No Sé Tú" ranked second on the poll for the best all-time Spanish song in the United States by Univision, after "Piel Morena" by Mexican singer Thalía.

=== Weekly charts ===
Chart performance for "No Sé Tú"
Chart (1992)	Peak position
Mexico (El Informador)	1
US Hot Latin Songs (Billboard)	1

=== Year-end charts ===
Chart (1992)	Rank
US Hot Latin Songs (Billboard)	2

== Certifications ==
Region	Certification	Certified units/sales
Spain (Promusicae)	Gold	30,000^{‡}
^{‡} Sales+streaming figures based on certification alone.

== See also ==
- List of number-one hits of 1992 (Mexico)
- List of number-one Billboard Hot Latin Tracks of 1992
