= Roy Rosselló =

Puerto Rican singer (born 1969)

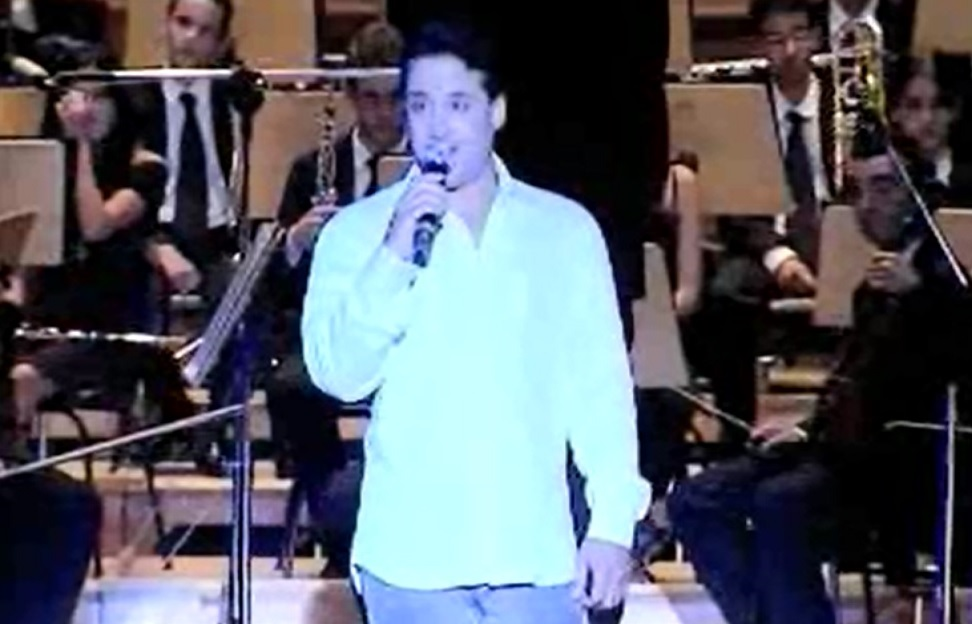
- Roy Rosselló performing in 2002
- Born: Roy Stephan Rosselló Diaz; May 1, 1970 (age 56); San Juan, Puerto Rico
- Occupations: Singer, actor, missionary
- Children: 5

Roy Stephan Rosselló Díaz (born May 1, 1969) is a Puerto Rican pop and gospel singer, businessman, and former member of the popular Puerto Rican group Menudo. Roy currently lives in Brazil, where he focused his musical career and built a family.

Through his membership in Menudo as well as his personal pursuits, he has participated in several television series and shows, such as The Love Boat, The Morning Show, Solid Gold, Good Morning America, and Soul Train, appearing in all the major networks, such as CBS, NBC, SBT and Fox, in addition to several international festivals and award ceremonies, such as the Tokyo Music Festival, where he won the Gold Award. In 1984, he was a presenter at the Grammys, handing the award for Best Recording for Children to Michael Jackson for his album "E.T. the Extra Terrestrial"

== Early life ==
In his youth, Roy was a player for the Puerto Rican National Children's Soccer Team.

Roselló was a member of Menudo from August 1983 to January 1986 and debuted on the album A Todo Rock, albeit he didn't have lead vocals from the album, including Reaching Out and Mania. He recorded a total of six albums with the group, with the second half of the albums he was in, he had lead vocals on one song per each album. During his time, Menudo reached great popularity in Asia, more specifically in the Philippines and Japan. They had hits like "Indianápolis" and "Like A Cannonball," which was featured in the film Cannonball Run 2. It was also during his tenure in the Menudo lineup that the group scored their biggest hit in the United States, "Hold Me." Roy sang lead in the second version of "Ladron De Amor" and is seen prominently in the music video. He also sang lead in the song, "No Hay Reflexion" from the Grammy nominated album Evolucion. He also sang lead in the songs "Transformation" in English, "Alegra Esa Cara" in Spanish and "Alegra Essa Cara" in Portuguese. During concerts and TV appearances he sang lead in the song "Cambiale las Pilas"'s ("Gotta Get On Moving") second Spanish version as well as its English version, "Subete a Mi Moto", "Ghostbusters" and "One Night in Bangkok."

== Personal life ==
In 1986, Roy met Brazilian children’s TV host Mara Maravilha and they started dating. Mara got pregnant by Roy, but her mother made her get an abortion in 1987. At the time the couple lived together for two years in a house he had in New York. Their relationship ended in 1988; Mara stated in interviews that he wanted her to stop singing.

Rosselló is the father of five children with five different women, including eldest son Roy Jr. with his first wife Mireya Nieves, whom he married on October 14, 1989. The marriage was concluded by a divorce decree issued on December 10, 1993. He was married to his second wife Brenda Colon Reyes for a year and a half. He also has another son named Enrico with his third wife, Mirella Rodriguez Marcolini (m. 2008-2010), and a daughter Sophia, born in 2009, who was the result of a six-month relationship with Natália Borges, a former employee of a store he owned in Campinas.

In 2003, he went to Campinas after he had to acknowledge the paternity of his eldest child, Bianca, when he appeared on a TV program in Brazil. She was born when he was 15 years old. The girl is a result of his fling with a teenage Brazilian fan when he was on tour with Menudo in 1985. In addition to Roy Jr., Enrico, Sophia and Bianca, he also has a son named Guilhermo.

In a 2014 interview, he said he should have been more responsible in his romantic life: "I always liked women, but I should have been more careful." He also stated that he believes women approached him because of money. "Because I was a famous guy, they think I have money, but it’s all an illusion. For them it’s not important to allow me to have a good relationship with my children, they just want money," he said.

In 1994, he married Marta Rhaulin. For 11 years, the two performed as a called Duo Roy and Rhaulin.

He married Patricia Avila in 2014. They divorced in 2018.

=== Post-Menudo ===
He spent 1987 touring the United States, starred in a movie called Star of the Jungle, and was the host of Frente Jovem in 1986, a Brazilian TV show.

In 1991, Rossello studied TV production at the Art Institute of Fort Lauderdale in Florida.

Since 2006, Rosselló has run a Caribbean-themed bar in the city of Campinas, located in the state of São Paulo, Brazil, where he also owns a jewelry store, Roy Rosello Fine Jewelry.

In 2006, through another TV show in Brazil, he met his long-lost daughter and decided to settle in the South American country.

In April 2025, NBC was sued in Federal Court for libel to the brand name Menudo. NBC Lawsuit Story on TMZ Menudo Promoter Sues NBC

=== Return to music ===
In 2009, Rosselló entered into the Brazilian music scene, when he formed a band of axé and Caribbean music.

=== A Fazenda ===
On September 14, 2014, he was a contestant on the Brazilian reality show A Fazenda 7 on TV Record.

== Discography ==
=== With Menudo ===
- A Todo Rock (1983) (Didn't have lead vocals)
- Reaching Out (1984) (Didn't have lead vocals)
- Mania (1984) (Didn't have lead vocals)
- Evolucion (1984)
- Menudo (1985)
- Ayer y Hoy (1985)

== See also ==
- List of Puerto Ricans
