= No Podrás =

1992 single by Cristian Castro

Single by Cristian Castro

from the album Agua Nueva
- Released: 1992
- Recorded: 1991
- Genre: Latin pop, pop rock, glam metal
- Length: 4:02
- Label: Melody, Fonovisa
- Songwriters: Alejandro Zepeda, Peter Skrabak
- Producer: Alejandro Zepeda

Cristian Castro singles chronology
"No Podrás" (1992)	"Solo Dame una Noche" (1993)

Audio sample
- A 24-second sample of No Podrás by Cristian Castro.: file; help

"No Podrás" (English: "You Won't Be Able To") is a song written and composed by Alejandro Zepeda and Peter Skrabak, originally recorded by Mexican recording artist Cristian Castro. Lyrically, the song describes the end of a relationship between two lovers where the protagonist tells the lover that she will not forget how much he loved her. The song was released by Fonovisa Records as the lead single from Castro's debut studio album Agua Nueva (1992). It peaked at number three on the US Billboard Hot Latin Songs chart. It was well received by music critics, despite negative reception of its parent album.

In 1993 Dominican merengue musician Fernando Villalona covered the song on his album El Niño Mimado. His version of the song peaked at number thirty-two on the US Billboard Hot Latin Songs.

== Background ==
Cristian Castro rose to fame at age five when he began his acting career with his mother, famous actress and singer, Verónica Castro. His first role was on the telenovela El Derecho de Nacer (1981). At age seven, he became the lead singer of his band Cristian y los Pollitos (Cristian and the Little Roosters) and performed live on the TV show Siempre en Domingo. At age fourteen, he formed rock band Los Demonios Deliciosos (The Delicious Demons) whom he performed with for two years. After his departure from the band, Castro became a presenter at the annual OTI Festival where he performed the song "16 Diciembres" ("16 Decembers").

Castro could not afford to record a studio album with his own finances. His friend, Alejandro Zepeda, resolved this problem by selling Castro's personal belongings, including his car. As a result, Castro recorded his first album, Agua Nueva, produced by Zepeda and released by Fonovisa Records. In 2012, Castro recorded a live version of "No Podrás" with new arrangements by Matt Rolling and produced Aureo Baqueiro and features fellow Mexican singer Benny Ibarra. This version was included on his second live album En Primera Fila: Día 2 in 2014.

== Music and lyrics ==
"No Podrás" was written and composed by Alejandro Zepeda and Peter Skrabak. Lyrically, the song describes the end of a relationship between two lovers where the protagonist tells the lover that she will not forget how much he loved her. As with the other songs in the album, "No Podrás" was recorded and produced in California and promoted by Televisa.

== Release and reception ==
"No Podrás" debuted at number 39 on the Billboard Hot Latin Songs chart on the week of 25 July 1992. The song climbed to the top ten on the week of 29 August 1992 and peaked at number three two weeks later. To promote the song, a music video was made for "No Podrás" which shows Castro performing the song for a live audience, inserting some sequences of a female dancer and different backgrounds. The video ends in a freeze frame of Castro embracing a 15-year-old female fan on stage, after his performance. Another music video features Castro performing this song while he is walking at the sea shore. The song also reached number one on the hit parade chart in Mexico City.

An editor of Caretas magazine, while giving Agua Nueva a negative review, felt that "No Podrás" was "excellent work" and remarked that the other songs in the album did not come close to its quality. An editor of Cromos magazine praised the lyrics of the song and said "it was the most beautiful song I have heard". On the review of the Castro's compilation album Esenciales: The Ultimate Collection, Heather Phares of Allmusic commented that "No Podrás" had a "slinky" feel. "No Podrás" was recognized as one of the award-winning songs at the first BMI Latin Awards in 1994.

== Formats and track listings ==
7" promo
No.	Title	Length
1.	"No Podrás"	4:02

No Podras Remixes
No.	Title	Length
1.	"No Podrás (Radio Mix)"
2.	"No Podrás (Club Mix)"

== Charts ==
=== Weekly charts ===
Chart (1992)	Peak position
US Hot Latin Songs (Billboard)	3

=== Yearly charts ===
Chart (1992)	Peak position
US Hot Latin Songs (Billboard)	16

== Credits and personnel ==
Credits adapted from the Allmusic.

- Cristian Castro – vocals
- Alejandro "Alex" Zepeda – producer, arranger, songwriting, vocals
- Kiko Cibrian – Arranger, Chorus, Production Coordination,
- Peter Skrabak – Composer

== Fernando Villalona version ==
"No Podrás"

Single by Fernando Villalona

from the album El Nino Mimado
- Released: 1993
- Genre: Merengue
- Length: 5:04
- Label: Camino
- Songwriters: Alejandro Zepeda, Peter Skrabak
- Producer: Fernando Villalona

Fernando Villalona singles chronology
"No Podrás" (1993)	"Corazón Salvaje" (1994)

In 1993, Dominican merengue musician Fernando Villalona covered the song on his album, El Nino Mimado and released it as the album's first single. His version peaked at number 32 on the Hot Latin Songs chart. In 1997, it appeared on his compilation album Historias de Una Vida. Stephen Erlewine of Allmusic considered the song to be "one of his finest" in his career.

=== Weekly charts ===
Chart (1994)	Peak position
US Hot Latin Songs (Billboard)	32

=== Credits and personnel ===
Credits adapted from Allmusic.

- Fernando Villalona – Arranger, composer, Executive Producer, Mixing, Primary Artist, producer, Vocals, Vocals (Background)
- Angel Cornielle – Bass
- Pavin Cornielle – Bass
- Arturo Sanquintin – Congas
- Jose Contreras – Guira, Tamboura
- Martin Villalona – Mixing, producer, Trombone, Vocals (Background)
- Papo Cadena – Saxophone
- Aramis Villalona – Vocals (Background)

== See also ==
- List of number-one hits of 1992 (Mexico)
