= Con Amor - Tus Éxitos Favoritos =

Compilation album by Menudo
- Released: 1984
- Recorded: 1979–1984
- Genre: Pop
- Label: RCA

Menudo chronology
Reaching Out (1984)	Con Amor - Tus Éxitos Favoritos (1984)	Mania (1984)

Con Amor - Tus Éxitos Favoritos is a compilation album by the Puerto Rican boy band Menudo, released in 1984. The tracklist brings together many of the hits that contributed to the quintet's popularity at the time, performed by both past and current members. In total, it features twelve songs that previously appeared on six of the group's albums released between 1979 and 1984, namely: Chiquitita (1979), Fuego (1981), Quiero ser (1981), Una Aventura Llamada Menudo (1982), Por amor (1982), and Reaching Out (1984).

== Content ==
All songs were produced by Menudo's creator, Edgardo Díaz, except for "Like a Cannonball," the theme song for the movie Cannonball Run II, which was produced by Díaz alongside Snuff Garrett and Mary Lynne Pagán. Regarding the album's artwork, the LP includes a colorful poster featuring photos of the group's 13 members since its formation in 1977.

According to the vice president of RCA International, Mario de la Higuera, "Menudo's global fanbase had been eagerly awaiting a definitive compilation of their hits. We are pleased with the sales prospects in the group's traditional markets. However, we also aim, with this luxurious combination of a record and poster, to expand the group's popularity into new territories."

== Reception ==
Regarding reviews by music critics, the AllMusic critic rated it two out of five stars, though they did not write any commentary for the album.

Commercially, the album performed well in the United States, where it appeared on Billboard magazine's Top Latin Albums chart.

== Track listing ==
- Credits adapted from the LP Con amor - tus éxitos favoritos, released in 1984.

No.	Title	Writer(s)	Original album	Length
1.	"Like a Cannonball"	S. H. Dorff, M. L. Brown, S. Garrett	Reaching Out	3:20
2.	"Lady"	J. Seijas, C. Villa, A. Monroy	Por amor	3:35
3.	"Quiero Rock"	J. Seijas, C. Villa, A. Monroy	Por amor	2:33
4.	"Chiquitita"	J. Anderson, B. Ulvaeus	Chiquitita	5:02
5.	"Cambiale las pilas"	A. Monroy, C. Villa	Una aventura llamada Menudo	3:39
6.	"Clara"	A. Monroy, C. Villa	Una aventura llamada Menudo	3:30
7.	"Súbete a mi moto"	E. Díaz, C. Villa	Quiero Ser	3:30
8.	"Quiero ser"	E. Díaz, L. Soto	Quiero ser	3:04
9.	"A volar"	A. Monroy, C. Villa, E. Díaz	Una aventura llamada Menudo	4:12
10.	"Es por amor"	J. Seijas, C. Villa, A. Monroy	Por amor	3:51
11.	"Fuego"	L. E. Colón	Fuego	3:02
12.	"Lluvia"	A. Monroy, C. Villa, E. Díaz	Una aventura llamada Menudo	3:06

== Charts ==
Music chart (1984)	Peak position
US (Billboard Top Latin Albums - Texas)	8
