= List of number-one hits of 1992 (Mexico) =

This is a list of the songs that reached number one in Mexico in 1992, according to the Notitas Musicales magazine with data provided by Radio Mil(which also provided charts for Billboard's "Hits of the World" between 1969 and 1981).

Notitas Musicales was a bi-weekly magazine that published two record charts:

- "Canciones que México canta" ("Songs that Mexico sings"), which listed the Top 10 most popular Spanish-language songs in Mexico, and
- "Hit Parade", which was a Top 10 of the most popular songs in Mexico that were in languages other than Spanish. For reasons unknown, the magazine stopped publishing the "Hit Parade" chart in 1988 and wouldn't feature it again until 1993.

== Chart history ==
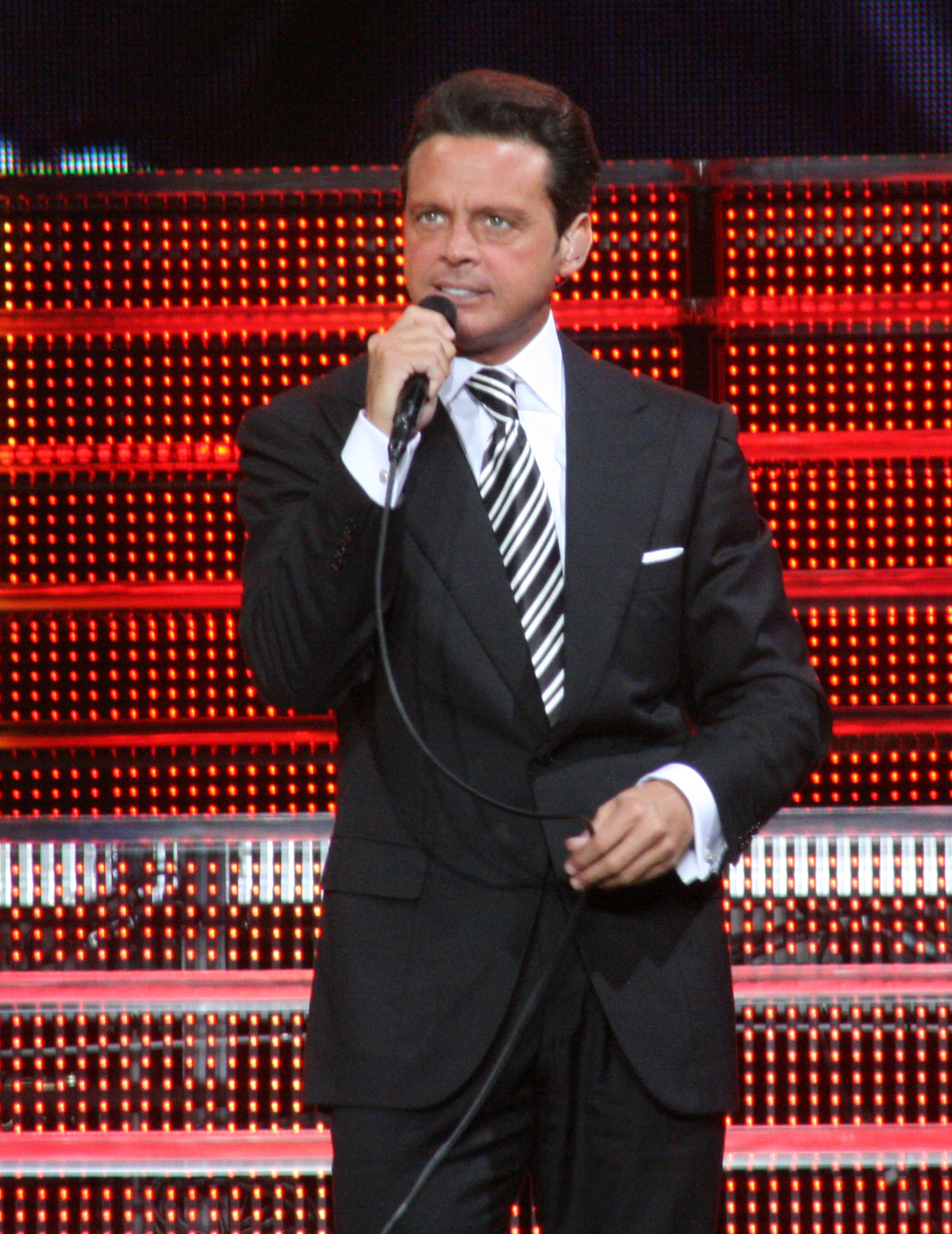
Mexican singer Luis Miguel (pictured) spent 6 months at the No. 1 position.

| Issue Date | "Songs that Mexico sings" (Spanish) | | |
| Issue Date | Song | Artist(s) | Ref. |
|---|---|---|---|
| 1 January | "Inolvidable" | Luis Miguel | |
| 15 January | "Inolvidable" | Luis Miguel | |
| 1 February | "Inolvidable" | Luis Miguel | |
| 15 February | "Inolvidable" | Luis Miguel | |
| 1 March | "Inolvidable" | Luis Miguel | |
| 15 March | "Inolvidable" | Luis Miguel | |
| 1 April | "Inolvidable" | Luis Miguel | |
| 15 April | "No sé tú" | Luis Miguel | |
| 1 May | "No sé tú" | Luis Miguel | |
| 15 May | "No sé tú" | Luis Miguel | |
| 1 June | "No sé tú" | Luis Miguel | |
| 15 June | "Pisando fuerte" | Alejandro Sanz | |
| 1 July | "No sé tú" | Luis Miguel | |
| 15 July | "No sé tú" | Luis Miguel | |
| 1 August | "No Podrás" | Cristian Castro | |
| 15 August | "No Podrás" | Cristian Castro | |
| 1 September | "No Podrás" | Cristian Castro | |
| 15 September | "Evidencias" | Ana Gabriel | |
| 1 October | "Evidencias" | Ana Gabriel | |
| 15 October | "La puerta del colegio" | Magneto | |
| 1 November | "Evidencias" | Ana Gabriel | |
| 15 November | "América, América" | Luis Miguel | |
| 1 December | "América, América" | Luis Miguel | |
| 15 December | "América, América" | Luis Miguel | |

== See also ==
- 1992 in music

== Sources ==
- Print editions of the Notitas Musicales magazine.
