= Reaching Out (Menudo album) =

Studio album by Menudo
- Released: January 1984
- Recorded: 1983–1984, Kirios, Spain (Music) and Ochoa, Puerto Rico (vocals)
- Genre: Latin pop
- Length: 33:19
- Label: RCA
- Producer: Edgardo Díaz; additional production by Mary Lynne M Pagan

Menudo chronology
A Todo Rock (1983)	Reaching Out (1984)	Con Amor - Tus Éxitos Favoritos (1984)

Reaching Out is the fourteenth studio album by the Puerto Rican boy band Menudo, released in 1984 by RCA. The album stands out as their first English record in their discography, and marks the group's phonographic debut in Brazil. The group consisted of members Ricky, Charlie, Ray, Roy, and Robby.

The album's songs consist of tracks selected from their last four Spanish language albums, translated into English, with the exception of the original song "Like A Cannonball," recorded for the soundtrack of Burt Reynolds’ film Cannonball Run II. In addition to the mentioned track, singles included "If You're Not Here (By My Side)", "Heavenly Angel", and "Motorcycle Dreamer".

The album received a positive reception from audiences and critics alike. Sales surpassed 425,000 copies in the United States and 1 million in Brazil, earning it a diamond certification in the latter.

== Background and production ==
The album was the group’s first release after signing a six-year deal (for 12 LPs) with RCA, valued at a multimillion-dollar amount comparable to artists such as Kenny Rogers and Diana Ross. The lineup featured members Ricky (16), Charlie (15), Ray (14), Roy (14), and new member Robby (14). The latter replaced Johnny Lozada after he reached the group's age limit of 16. The campaign supporting their first English album was part of the label's strategy to expand its market beyond its southern borders, particularly targeting American audiences. By 1983, Menudo had already sold 750,000 copies of all their albums in the U.S., while their next album, A Todo Rock, sold 250,000 copies in the country within a month.

The success of this transition greatly depended on the group's ability to sing well in English, prompting the members to undergo an intensive language training program aimed at minimizing any traces of a Spanish accent. The group even recorded the English version of the theme song for the film Cannonball Run II, starring Burt Reynolds. Another challenge identified was maintaining the group's popularity in a volatile market, especially considering the rotation of members since Menudo's concept involved replacing members as they aged. According to music critic Stephen Holden, although this formula could theoretically ensure eternal youth, concerns remained about the durability of their music, which followed a pre-packaged pop style that limited its longevity in the music market.

Beyond the album, RCA planned the release of two music videos directed by Paquito Cordero, who also produced TV specials featuring the group.

As written in the LP's credit section: Reaching Out was a collaborative production, arranged and conducted by Alejandro Monroy and Carlos Villa. The main production was handled by Edgardo Díaz, with additional contributions by Mary Lynne M. Pagan. Vocal recordings were engineered by Jaime Camacho, while José Vinader managed the music engineering. Carlos Martos was responsible for the album's mixing.

== Promotion ==
On October 19, 1984, TV Globo aired a special titled Menudo Especial, in which eight of the ten songs from Reaching Out were performed live. The recordings took place during the II Festival Internacional do Menudo, held in August 1984 in Puerto Rico.

The group performed ten sold-out shows at the Radio City Music Hall in New York City.

== Singles ==
"If You're Not Here (By My Side)" was released as a single in 1983. The track is the English version of the Spanish single "Si Tú No Estás," featured on the 1983 album A Todo Rock. This love song features Robby Rosa as the lead vocalist. According to Cashbox magazine, the song "features a classic pop melody sung by a youthful, high-pitched, and exceptionally clear male voice, accompanied by an orchestral background with 101 string instruments". In the United States, the song reached number 36 on Billboard's Hot R&B/Hip-Hop Songs chart.

In Brazil, the song was included in the soundtrack of the TV Globo soap opera Partido Alto, serving as the theme for the character Fernando, played by Roberto Bataglin. According to Veja magazine, the song "topped the charts as one of the most played songs on FM radio stations across the country." (Note: According to Diário de Pernambuco journal, "If You're Not Here (By My Side)" appeared in the lists of most-played songs on FM radio stations in Rio de Janeiro and São Paulo.) The single sold 270,000 copies in Brazil, and reached number one on the Nelson Oliveira Pesquisa e Estudo de Mercado (Nopem) list.

According to the Correio Braziliense newspaper, the songs "If You're Not Here," "Heavenly Angel," and "Because of Love" were frequently requested on the radio in 1985, even though the group had released a more recent album in the country.

== Critical reception ==
Professional ratings
Review scores
Source	Rating
AllMusic	4/5 stars

Although AllMusic did not publish a written review, the site rated the album four out of five stars. Sérgio Nona of Diário de Pernambuco described the album as very well-produced, with joyful songs likely to appeal to both adults and children.

Journalist Tárik de Souza from Jornal do Brasil noted that the album mixes rock and ballads in the "shrill voices" of the quintet, accompanied by a "standardized and outdated" sonic backdrop. He mentioned that the track "Motorcycle Dreamer" "is the album's sole moment where the drums break free from the danceable constraints for a brief dry solo", but he pointed out that the group was far from artists like The Beatles, to whom they were often compared.

== Commercial performance ==
The album peaked at number 108 on the Billboard 200, becoming the group's first album to chart in the United States. According to Rolling Stone, the album's and singles' modest success on U.S. charts did not prevent the group from becoming "a cultural phenomenon driven by marketing prowess and the sale of essential non-musical merchandise".

In Brazil, it appeared on the Nopem charts as one of the best-selling albums. By mid-1985, Billboard reported sales of 425,000 copies in the country. According to Jornal dos Sports on March 28, 1985, after their final concert in São Paulo, the group received a diamond disc from the vice president of RCA International's Latin American Division for selling 1 million copies of the album.

== Track listing ==
No.	Title	Writer(s)	Performer	Length
1.	"Like a Cannonball"	Snuff Garrett, Steve Dorff, Milton Brown	Robby Rosa	3:18
2.	"Indianapolis"	Alejandro Monroy, Carlos Villa	Charlie Massó	3:34
3.	"Heavenly Angel"	Monroy, Villa, Mary Lynne M Pagan	Charlie Massó	3:34
4.	"Because of Love"	Pagan, Villa, Julio Seijas, Eddy Guerin	Robby Rosa	3:46
5.	"Motorcycle Dreamer"	Pagan, Villa, Edgardo Díaz	Ricky Meléndez	3:20
6.	"If You're Not Here - By My Side"	Díaz, Monroy, Pagan, Villa	Robby Rosa	4:27
7.	"That's What You Do"	Monroy, Pagan, Villa	Ray Reyes	2:38
8.	"Gimme Rock"	Monroy, Pagan, Seijas, Villa	Robby Rosa	2:30
9.	"Gotta Get On Moving"	Monroy, Pagan, Villa	Ricky Meléndez	3:23
10.	"Fly Away"	Díaz, Monroy, Pagan, Villa	Robby Rosa	3:08

== Charts ==
Chart (1984)	Peak position
US Billboard 200	108

== Certifications and sales ==
Region	Certification	Sales
Brazil	Diamond	1,000,000
Philippines	Gold	
United States	—	450,000

== Production ==
- Arranged and conducted by Alejandro Monroy and Carlos Villa
- Produced by Edgardo Díaz, with additional production by Mary Lynne M. Pagan
- Engineered by Jaime Camacho (vocals) and Jose Vinader (music)
- Mixed by Carlos Martos
