= Ray Reyes =

Puerto Rican singer (1970–2021)

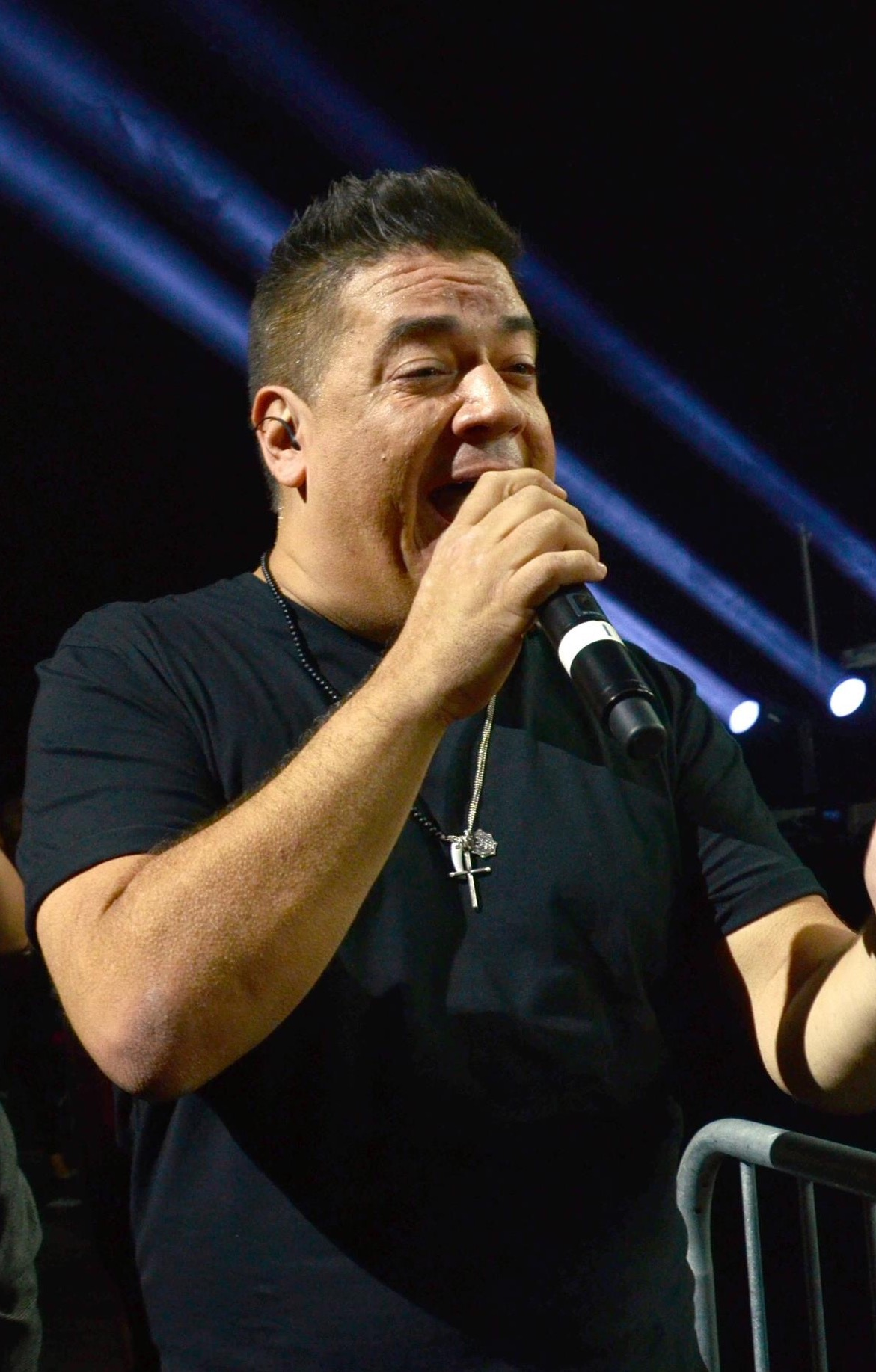

Background information
- Born: Ray Reyes Léon; March 13, 1970; New York City, NY
- Died: April 30, 2021 (aged 51) Toa Baja, Puerto Rico
- Genres: Latin pop, rock
- Occupations: Singer, producer
- Instrument: Vocals
- Years active: 1983–2021

Ray Reyes León (March 13, 1970 – April 30, 2021) was a Puerto Rican singer who was a member of the Puerto Rican boy band Menudo.

== Career ==
He was born in New York City and was raised in Levittown, a neighborhood in Toa Baja, Puerto Rico, the son of Ramon Reyes and Carmen Leon. He became a member of Menudo in early 1983. Reyes came to substitute Xavier Serbiá in the band, and joined the band right in the middle of Menudo's golden era.

Reyes amassed great popularity among Menudo fans, although he was known as the chubby one of the band. That nickname was started because, when he joined Menudo, Edgardo Diaz put him on a strict diet. That information was leaked out to all gossip magazines, which published the information immediately.

Ray's first album with Menudo was 1983's A Todo Rock, where he sang lead vocals on "Si Tu No Estas", "Chicle De Amor", and "Zumbador". He continued through the time when Menudo had the number 1 hit Indianapolis from the same album and when Menudo started making it to the covers of Tiger Beat and other major teen magazines, and also when Menudo became famous in Brazil, the Philippines, and Japan.

His next 3 albums recorded as a member of the band were all recorded in 1984. Reaching Out was the first one of '84 and the band's first album in English. Ray sang lead vocals on "That's What You Do". Mania was the second album of '84 and the band's first album in Portuguese. Ray sang lead vocals on "Quero Ser". Evolución was the third album of '84, it was also the last album recorded in 1984. Ray sang lead vocals on "Persecución" and "Yo No Fui". It was also Ray's last album recorded as a member of Menudo.

Ray was forced to leave the band after only 2 years in the group due to a sudden growth spurt. In 1986, the solo album Una y Otra Vez was released in Spanish and the album Minha Música in Portuguese. In 1988, he joined former Menudos Rene Farrait and Johnny Lozada in Proyecto M, once again substituting Serbiá. Proyecto M went on to enjoy great success in Puerto Rico and Venezuela.

In 1997 he came up with the idea of doing an ex Menudos' concert and reunited 6 of the golden era with former Menudo bandmates Miguel Cancel, Ricky Melendez, Charlie Massó and Johnny Lozada as well as Farrait for a single concert named El Reencuentro in the Roberto Clemente Coliseum (12,000 capacity) in San Juan. The concert did so well, that they finished doing 7 shows in two weekends and then went on a worldwide tour. They also had the record of most performances in that coliseum with 11 concerts. He produced their gold-certified live album El Reencuentro: 15 Años Después released by Fonovisa Records.

== Personal life ==
In 1992, Reyes married his first wife, Nora, with whom he had his son, Marcos Reyes, born in 1997. In 2004, he married his second wife, Maria, and later had a daughter, Cecilia Reyes. His father, Rey Reyes Sr., managed various business ventures. Ray remained active in music and performance until he died on April 30, 2021, in Puerto Rico from a massive heart attack at the age of 51.

== Death ==
On April 30, 2021, Ray Reyes died in Puerto Rico. Reyes was the second member of Menudo to die; Anthony Galindo, the first, preceded him by six months. Reyes died of a massive heart attack.

== Discography ==
=== With Menudo ===
- A Todo Rock (1983)
- Reaching Out (1984)
- Mania (1984)
- Evolución (1984)

=== As a solo artist ===
- Minha Música (1986) (in Portuguese)
- Una y Otra Vez (1986) (in Spanish)

=== With Proyecto M ===
- Proyecto M 2 (1989)
- Arde que me quemas (1991)
- Si No Estás Conmigo (1993)
