= América, América (song) =

1973 single by Nino Bravo

"América América"
- 1973 original Spain vinyl release

Single by Nino Bravo

from the album ....Y Volumén 5
- B-side: "Yo no sé por qué esta melodia"
- Released: September 1973
- Genre: pop
- Length: 3:34
- Label: PolyGram
- Songwriters: José Luis Armenteros; Pablo Herrero

Nino Bravo singles chronology
"Libre" (1972)	"América América" (1973)	"Amanecer" (1975)

"América América" is a song written by José Luis Armenteros and Pablo Herrero and performed by Spanish performer Nino Bravo. It was released as a single for his fifth studio album y volumen 5 (1973). The song reached number one on the Spanish Singles Chart in 1973. In 2013, the song was inducted into the Latin Grammy Hall of Fame.

== Luis Miguel version ==
"América América"

Single by Luis Miguel

from the album América & En Vivo
- Released: 1992
- Recorded: 1992
- Genre: Latin pop
- Length: 4:33
- Label: WEA Latina
- Songwriters: José Luis Armenteros; Pablo Herrero
- Producers: Humberto Gatica; Mauricio Abaroa

Luis Miguel singles chronology
"Contigo en la Distancia" (1992)	"América América" (1992)	"Ayer" (1993)

In 1992, Mexican recording artist Luis Miguel covered "América América" on his live extended play (EP) América & En Vivo. The song peaked at number 20 on the Billboard Hot Latin Songs chart. The music video for "América América" was filmed across several locations in the United States and Puerto Rico. Miguel dedicated the song to the soldiers who participated in the Gulf War. The music video won the Viewer's Choice award for MTV Internacional at the 1993 MTV Video Music Awards and received a nomination for Video of the Year at the 5th Annual Lo Nuestro Awards in the same year.

=== Weekly charts ===
Chart (1992–93)	Peak position
Dominican Republic (UPI)	1
Ecuador (UPI)	1
El Salvador (UPI)	6
Mexico (AMPROFON)	1
Peru (UPI)	6
Uruguay (UPI)	8
US Hot Latin Songs (Billboard)	20

== See also ==
- List of number-one singles of 1973 (Spain)
- List of number-one hits of 1992 (Mexico)
