= Inolvidable (song) =

Song written and composed by Julio Gutiérrez

Song
- Language: Spanish
- Published: 1944
- Genre: Bolero
- Songwriter: Julio Gutiérrez

"Inolvidable" ("Unforgettable") is a song written by Julio Gutiérrez in 1944. It is considered one of the most popular boleros released during the Cuban musical movement led by pianists. The song has been recorded by several performers, including Roberto Carlos, Diego El Cigala, Fania All-Stars, Eydie Gormé, Danny Rivera, Tito Rodríguez and Bebo Valdés, among others.

In the song, the protagonist kisses different lips looking for new sensations, haunted by the memory of a past love. The song has experienced popular acclaim, especially with the version recorded by Mexican singer Luis Miguel on his album Romance released in 1991. This version peaked at the top of the Billboard Top Latin Songs chart in the United States, and the album was deemed responsible for reviving the bolero genre.

== Background and composition ==
"Inolvidable" was written by Cuban pianist Julio Gutiérrez. Gutiérrez was born in Manzanillo, Cuba, and at age six he played piano and at 14 he directed his own orchestra. In 1940, the Orchestra Casino de la Playa toured eastern Cuba, and on that tour Miguelito Valdés met Gutiérrez and suggested he should go to the capital (Havana), where better opportunities would arise. Months later, Gutiérrez moved to the capital, and was hired as a pianist in the orchestra Casino de la Playa. "Inolvidable", written in 1944, was released during the Cuban musical movement led by pianists, in which Gutiérrez participated. Two songs composed by Gutiérrez, "Inolvidable" and "Llanto de Luna" ("Crying Moon"), were highly successful boleros in Latin America. In 1992, a compilation album including an instrumental version of the song performed by Gutiérrez was released.

Musically "Inolvidable" is a bolero. According to Rodrigo Bazán, in his book Y Si Vivo Cien Años... Antología del Bolero en México, the song was not different from others that were released at the time about unhappy love, but differed from other popular genres that based their lyrics on the lack of love such as tango. With the song, Julio Gutiérrez joined the list of prominent boleristas in Cuba. Lyrically, the song presents the protagonist kissing different lips and looking for new sensations ("He besado otras bocas buscando nuevas ansiedades").

== Performers ==
In 1963, Tito Rodríguez recorded "Inolvidable" on his album From Tito Rodríguez with Love. The song became very successful, selling one-and-a-half million units. Musical ensemble Fania All-Stars released their first studio album, Tribute to Tito Rodríguez, in 1976 and included a cover version of "Inolvidable". The album was originally intended to feature the group in a supporting role for Rodríguez, but it resulted in a tribute album after the singer died from leukemia in early 1973. Brazilian singer-songwriter Roberto Carlos included his version of the song on the album Quero Que Vá Tudo Pro Inferno in 1975. Puerto Rican Danny Rivera recorded a tribute album titled Inolvidable Tito: A Mi Me Pasa lo Mismo Que a Usted, including a version of "Inolvidable". The album received a Grammy Award nomination for Best Latin Pop Performance. In 1988, American singer Eydie Gormé had her version of the track on the album De Corazón a Corazón. Cuban pianist Bebo Valdés and Spanish flamenco performer Diego El Cigala recorded the track for their collaborative album Lágrimas Negras. The album was produced in 2003 by Academy Award winner Fernando Trueba, sold 200,000 units in Spain, and won the Latin Grammy Award for Best Traditional Tropical Album. Paloma San Basilio recorded "Inolvidable" on her album Invierno Sur, released in January 2007.

=== Luis Miguel version ===
"Inolvidable"

Single by Luis Miguel

from the album Romance
- Released: November 1991
- Recorded: 1991, Ocean Way Recording (Hollywood, California)
- Genre: Bolero
- Length: 4:19
- Label: WEA Latina
- Songwriter: Julio Gutiérrez
- Producers: Armando Manzanero; Luis Miguel

Luis Miguel singles chronology
"Amante del Amor" (1991)	"Inolvidable" (1991)	"No Sé Tú" (1992)

Audio sample
- A 24-second sample of Luis Miguel's cover of "Inolvidable".: file; help

Mexican singer Luis Miguel released the 1991 album Romance, which was produced by Luis Miguel and Mexican singer-songwriter Armando Manzanero, and included a selection of classic boleros. The success of the album revived interest in bolero, even though the new musical arrangements of the songs make them unrecognizable. Romance received a Grammy Award nomination for Best Latin Pop Album (which it lost to Jon Secada's Otro Día Más Sin Verte), was certified platinum by the Recording Industry Association of America, and sold seven million copies worldwide. The first single taken from the album was "Inolvidable", a version that, according to Carlos Monsiváis in his book Los Rituales del Caos, guarantees "the adoption of the past, and that the romantic sensibility is not dead."

The track debuted in the Billboard Top Latin Songs chart (formerly Hot Latin Tracks) at number 30 in the week of November 23, 1991, climbing to the top ten three weeks later. "Inolvidable" peaked at number one on January 25, 1992, spending five weeks at the top of the chart. The song was number three on the Billboard Top Latin Songs Year-End Chart of 1992. In Mexico, the song and the following single ("No Sé Tú") remained at the top of the charts for six months altogether. Luis Miguel's cover was recognized as one of the award-winning songs at the 1994 BMI Latin Awards. Elsewhere in Latin America, "Inolvidable" topped the charts in Colombia; and reached the top-ten in Chile, El Salvador, Panama, Peru, and Puerto Rico.

A live version of "Inolvidable" was included on the EP América & En Vivo in 1992 and as a part of a medley with the rest of the singles taken from Romance on the live album Vivo (2000). The track was also added to the compilation album Grandes Éxitos in 2005.

==== Format and track listing ====
Mexican Promo CD Single

1. "Inolvidable" – 4:19

==== Credits and personnel ====
Credits adapted from the "Inolvidable" liner notes.

- Luis Miguel – co-production, vocals
- Julio Gutiérrez – songwriting
- Armando Manzanero – production
- Bebu Silvetti – co-production, arranging

==== Weekly charts ====
Chart (1991–92)	Peak position
Chile (UPI)	3
Colombia (UPI)	1
El Salvador (UPI)	10
Mexico (AMPROFON)	1
Panama (UPI)	2
Peru (UPI)	8
Puerto Rico (UPI)	8
US Hot Latin Songs (Billboard)	1

== See also ==
- List of number-one hits of 1992 (Mexico)
- List of number-one Billboard Hot Latin Tracks of 1992
- Billboard Top Latin Songs Year-End Chart
