= Una y Otra Vez (Ray Reyes album) =

Studio album by Menudo
- Released: 1986
- Studio: Rey Records
- Genre: Pop
- Label: Philips

Menudo chronology
Minha Música (1986)	Una y Otra Vez (1986)

Una y Otra Vez is a studio album by Puerto Rican singer Ray Reyes, a former member of the boy band Menudo, released in 1986 by the record label Rey Records. The album consists of ten tracks divided between sides A and B, with compositions by various writers, including César Noroña, Gari Bribiesca, Ernesto Cardinal, Don Batte, Jeanette Dacosta, Susy D’Pecor, among others, as well as contributions from Ray Reyes himself in lyrics and melodies.

This was Reyes' last solo album. After the release of this album and its predecessor, Minha Música, the artist joined other former Menudo members in projects like Proyecto M and El Reencuentro.

== Background and context ==
After leaving Menudo in 1985, Ray Reyes began his solo career with the album Minha Música, released in Brazil. Recorded in Puerto Rico, the album featured songs by Brazilian and Puerto Rican composers, including the original track "Quero", co-written with Ruco Gandía. The promotion included an extensive tour across Brazilian cities and appearances on TV shows. The project marked Ray's transition to an independent career, blending Menudo's influences with a new artistic identity. During this period, the singer moved to Brazil and began working on his second album, which would become Una y otra vez.

== Production and recording ==
The album was produced and directed by Ruco Gandía for Rey Records. Recording took place at Ochoa Recordino Studios in Puerto Rico, with sound engineer Ronnie Torres handling recording and mixing. The technical process was finalized at Laquer Lab, where the album was mastered. Musical direction and arrangements were led by Ruco Gandía, who also contributed as a bassist and co-writer on some tracks. The backing band included musicians like Jorge Labdy (guitar), Hector Candela (drums), Carmen "Amuni" Nacer (keyboards), Roberto Cimenez (savedon), and Sabu (percussion). Backup vocals were performed by Dagmar, Giloa González, Humberto González, and Jamira Torres.

The compositions featured collaborations with Cezar Rossini, Gil Berson, Dom Beto, Brenda, André Christovam, Ruco Gandía, Willkins, Luis Claudio, and Tony Sampaio. The Spanish-language adaptations were handled by Ruco Gandía and Ray Reyes, showcasing a mix of romantic ballads and tropical rhythms. Visual design was overseen by Reine Zayas, with photography by Jochi Melero and final artwork by Ángel Ortiz.

== Songs ==
The album includes 10 tracks split between sides A and B. Eight of the songs are Spanish versions of tracks from Minha Música, while "Tenerte Cerca" appears in Spanish on both albums.

The track "Nora" is a Spanish version of "Dona", a 1982 song by the Brazilian duo Sá & Guarabyra, later covered by Roupa Nova on their 1985 album Roupa Nova. That same year, the song was featured in the soundtrack of the Rede Globo telenovela Roque Santeiro, becoming a major hit and the second most-played song on Brazilian radio that year. Reyes included the original Portuguese version in his Brazilian concerts.

== Promotion ==
To promote the album, Reyes embarked on a tour performing its tracks and appeared on TV shows. In 1986, he performed the song "Nora" on the Puerto Rican program Lo tomas o lo dejas, hosted by Pedro Zervigón and Cyd Marie Fleming. During the show, he gave an interview and dedicated the song to a fan in the audience (Maria Celeste).

== Track listing ==
Side A
No.	Title	Writer(s)	Portuguese version	Length
1.	"Una Noche en San Juan"	Cezar Rossini, Gil Berson	"Uma Noite no Havaí"
2.	"Nora"	Sá e Guarabyra	"Dona"
3.	"Pero el Tiempo Pasó"	Andre Christovam	"Fui Lembrar de Você"
4.	"Tenerte Cerca"	Ruco Candia
5.	"Quiero"	Ruco Candia, Ray	"Quero"

Side B
No.	Title	Writer(s)	Portuguese version	Length
1.	"Una y Otra Vez"	Dom Beto, Brenda	"A Primeira Vez"
2.	"Alegría de Soñar"	Dom Beto, Brenda	"Alegria de Sonhar"
3.	"Luna de Deseo"	Cezar Rossini, Paulo Reza	"Lua Cheia de Desejo"
4.	"Me Sentí Desnudo"	Willkins	"Eu Fiquei Sem Jeito"
5.	"No Me Puedo Controlar"	Luis Claudio, Tony Sampaio	"Com a Cabeça no Ar"
