= Un Año de Conciertos =

Video by Luis Miguel
- Released: 1989
- Recorded: April – June 1989
- Genre: Latin pop
- Length: 85:00
- Label: Televisa/Warner Music Vision

Luis Miguel chronology
Un Año de Conciertos (1989)	Luis Miguel: 20 Años (1991)

Un Año de Conciertos is a VHS video from the Mexican singer Luis Miguel. It was recorded in 1989 during the presentations of the artist by various places in Mexico after the release of his last album (at that time), Busca Una Mujer.

This video records (as the same title and an explanation in the video by Luis Miguel) one year of presentations. The video contains around 80 minutes of the concerts, and the other 5 minutes include an interview that Luis Miguel made specially for the video. The interview is cut and put in some parts of the video sequentially.

== Song list ==
1. Presentation
2. Soy Como Quiero Ser
3. Sunny
4. Yesterday
5. Es Mejor
6. Culpable o No
7. Ahora Te Puedes Marchar
8. Pupilas de Gato
9. Soy Un Perdedor
10. Cucurrucucú Paloma
11. La Incondicional
12. Perdoname
13. Yo Que No Vivo Sin Ti
14. Isabel
15. Separados
16. Por Favor Señora
17. Un Hombre Busca Una Mujer
18. Entregate
19. Palabra de Honor
20. Cuando Calienta el Sol
