= Romance: En Vivo =

Video by Luis Miguel
- Released: 1992
- Recorded: Summer 1992
- Genre: Latin pop, bolero
- Length: 97:00
- Label: Warner Music Vision

Luis Miguel chronology
Luis Miguel: 20 Años (1991)	Romance: En Vivo (1992)	El Concierto (1995)

Romance: En Vivo is a VHS video from Mexican singer Luis Miguel that was recorded in 1992 during the concert tour called Tour Romance (also known as Gira Romance ) that Luis Miguel perform in various places like Caracas, Venezuela, in the Circus Maximus Theatre in Las Vegas, Nevada, in a concert in Seville, Spain, and in the National Auditorium in Mexico City, where he broke the World Record by selling the 10,000 tickets for his only show in 3 hours.

The production of this video consists in taping all the concerts mentioned above. The result is that in the tape are featured parts of all concerts, making it in one tape with all the songs performed there.

Because the concerts were taped entirely, a years later were broadcast by various countries around South America and Mexico. From the show in the National Auditorium was recorded an EP that was released as América & En Vivo.

== Song list ==
1. Introduction
2. Oro De Ley
3. Amante Del Amor
4. Pupilas De Gato
5. Hoy El Aire Huele A Ti
6. Ahora Te Puedes Marchar
7. Alguien Como Tu
8. Entregate
9. Tengo Todo Excepto A Ti
10. Sera Que No Me Amas
11. No Me Platiques Mas
12. Contigo En La Distancia
13. La Puerta
14. La Mentira
15. Cuando Vuelva A Tu Lado
16. No Se Tu
17. Inolvidable
18. Un Hombre Busca Una Mujer
19. Cuando Calienta El Sol
