= A Todo Rock =

Studio album by Menudo
- Released: 1983
- Genre: Latin pop
- Length: 32:07
- Label: RCA Victor

Menudo chronology
| Feliz Navidad (1983) | A Todo Rock (1983) | Reaching Out (1984) |

A Todo Rock (All Rock) is the thirteenth studio album by the Puerto Rican boy band Menudo. It marked their first release following the signing of the quintet by RCA at the end of 1983. The album features Ricky Meléndez, Johnny Lozada, Charlie Massó, and new members Ray Reyes, who replaced Xavier Serbiá after Serbiá reached the age limit, and Roy Rosselló, who replaced Miguel Cancel after Cancel decided to quit the group. This was the first time that a member decided to leave before his time was due.

RCA launched an extensive promotional campaign that included ads in various media outlets, TV appearances, and live performances, which helped several singles chart and made this album one of the most successful in Menudo's career, with over 1 million copies sold worldwide.

== Background ==
The album features Ricky Meléndez, Johnny Lozada, Charlie Massó, and new members Ray Reyes, who replaced Xavier Serbiá upon his reaching the age limit, and Roy Rosselló, who replaced Miguel Cancel after Cancel chose to leave the group. This was the first time a member chose to leave before completing his time with the group. By that time, Menudo had already sold 750,000 copies in the United States and 3 million worldwide. In their home country, the group already had four gold and two platinum records for their albums and singles released in Puerto Rico.

In a 1998 interview, Cancel revealed his dissatisfaction with no longer being able to sing his songs after a sudden change in his voice, leading him to leave ahead of schedule and being replaced by Rosselló (who did not sing on the first three albums).

This was the last album that Johnny Lozada recorded as a group member. Robby Rosa (also known as Draco Rosa) sang on the album but was not credited for his contribution; he would later become an official member of the group.

== Promotion ==
RCA planned an intense promotional campaign for the album, including a 13-city national tour from November 5 to November 20. The group would perform in major markets, including Miami, Houston, Los Angeles, San Francisco, Chicago, and Hartford, Connecticut. The promotional strategy also involved posters, counter displays, and a massive national ad campaign aimed at both English and Spanish-speaking consumers.

Additionally, Menudo appeared on various U.S. television platforms. They made a special appearance on NBC's Silver Spoons in November and were featured by ABC's 20/20 during the Christmas season. Their television presence was further expanded with weekly appearances on ABC's Saturday morning programming aimed at young audiences, enhancing visibility with younger and family viewersIt is estimated that Menudo's appearances reached 70 million viewers in the United States.

Singles released for radio promotion of the album included "No Te Reprimas," "Chicle De Amor," "Indianapolis," "Si Tu No Estas," and "Piel De Manzana." The single "Chicle de Amor" peaked at numbers 4 and 6 in Mexico and Peru, respectively.

== Critical reception ==
Professional ratings
Review scores
| Source | Rating |
|---|---|
| AllMusic | 1/5 stars |

Critics' reviews of the album varied, with the critic from AllMusic rating it one star out of five but providing no written commentary.

== Commercial reception ==
On January 7, 1984, Billboard reported that sales reached 250,000 copies in the United States and Puerto Rico in the first month of release, which led RCA to award it a silver disc for the achievement. The group also earned a gold record for selling 500,000 copies in Central America. This was Menudo's first album to sell more than one million copies worldwide.

At that time, the group was named the first UNICEF Youth Ambassador by the United Nations Children's Fund. The RCA label promised UNICEF five cents from each album sold in the United States. The first payment was a check for $12,500 to the US Committee for UNICEF, drawn from the $250,000 earned from album sales. In September 1983, the newspaper La Opinion reported that sales had reached 300,000 copies, resulting in a $15,000 contribution to the organization up to that point.

== Track listing ==
| No. | Title | Writer(s) | Singer | Length |
|---|---|---|---|---|
| 1. | "Indianápolis" | Alejandro Monroy, Carlos Villa | Charlie Massó | 3:35 |
| 2. | "Piel De Manzana" | Edgardo Díaz, Alejandro Monroy, Manuel Pagan, Carlos Villa | Charlie Massó | 3:33 |
| 3. | "Chicle De Amor" | Alejandro Monroy, Carlos Villa | Ray Reyes | 2:43 |
| 4. | "Una Buena Razón" | Edgardo Díaz, Alejandro Monroy, Carlos Villa | Johnny Lozada | 2:42 |
| 5. | "Todo Va Bien" | Alejandro Monroy, Carlos Villa | Charlie Massó | 3:11 |
| 6. | "Si Tú No Estás" | Edgardo Díaz, Alejandro Monroy, Carlos Villa | Ray Reyes | 4:28 |
| 7. | "Amor En Bicicleta" | Edgardo Díaz, Alejandro Monroy, Carlos Villa | Ricky Meléndez | 3:36 |
| 8. | "Zumbador" | Alejandro Monroy, Carlos Villa | Ray Reyes | 3:12 |
| 9. | "Ladrón De Amor" | Alejandro Monroy, Carlos Villa | Johnny Lozada | 2:06 |
| 10. | "No Te Reprimas" | Edgardo Díaz, Alejandro Monroy, Carlos Villa | Charlie Massó | 3:01 |

== Charts ==
Weekly chart for A Todo Rock
| Music chart (1983) | Peak position |
|---|---|
| US (Billboard Top Latin Albums - California) | 1 |
| US (Billboard Top Latin Albums - Florida) | 2 |
| US (Billboard Top Latin Albums - New York) | 1 |
| US (Billboard Top Latin Albums - Texas) | 1 |
| Puerto Rico (Billboard Top LPs) | 1 |

== Certification sand sales ==
| Region | Certification | Estimated sales |
|---|---|---|
| United States and Puerto Rico | Silver | 300,000 |
Summaries
| Central America | Gold | 500,000 |
| World | — | 1,000,000+ |
