= César Portillo de la Luz =

César Portillo
- Born: César Portillo de la Luz; October 31, 1922; Havana, Cuba
- Origin: Havana
- Died: May 4, 2013 (aged 90) Havana
- Genres: Bolero, filin
- Occupations: Musician, lyricist, composer, housepainter
- Instrument: Guitar
- Years active: 1940s–2013 (till death)

César Portillo de la Luz (October 31, 1922 – May 4, 2013) was a Cuban musician, lyricist and composer. Born in Havana, Cuba, Portillo is credited with founding the filin music genre. The Miami Herald described Portillo as "a fundamental author of Latin American music" and "one of Cuba's most celebrated composers". Portillo is also cited as "the most distinguished lyricist of his generation" and "one of the most prolific Cuban composers of the twentieth century".

== Early life ==
Born on October 31, 1922 in Havana, Cuba to a cigar-roller, Portillo taught himself play the guitar. At first, he painted houses to earn his living and supplemented his income by giving guitar lessons. In 1946, he made his debut as a professional guitar player on radio. A weekly slot on Radio Mil Diez followed, which increased his popularity.

== Career and death ==
Portillo had his own show titled Feeling Season. Portillo received international prominence after his 1946 romance song "Contigo en la Distancia" ("With You in the Distance") was performed by Andy Russell. Portillo never revealed the identity of the woman who supposedly inspired him to write "Contigo en la Distancia". He is credited with founding the filin music genre, which was popular in the 1950s. Starting from the 1940s to the 1950s, Portillo actively performed at bars and clubs. More than a hundred different cover versions of his songs have been recorded internationally.

Portillo was awarded the Premio Latino a Toda Una Vida by the Spanish Academy of the Arts and Lyrics of Music at a ceremony held in Madrid in 2004. His songs like "Contigo en la distancia", "Tú mi delirio", "Sabrosón", "Noche cubana", "Realidad y Fantasía" and "Canción de un festival" have been performed by many well-established artists worldwide, including Nat King Cole, Christina Aguilera, José José, Luis Miguel and Lucho Gatica. He died on May 4, 2013, in Havana, Cuba, of an unspecified cause. In accordance with Portillo's requests, his body was cremated.

== See also ==
- Music of Cuba
- Deaths in 2013

== Bibliography ==
- Sublette, Ned (2007). Cuba and Its Music: From the First Drums to the Mambo. Chicago Review Press. ISBN 9781569764206.
