= Yellow Days =

Song composed by Alan Bernstein c. 1965

"La mentira (Se te olvida)", known in English as "Yellow Days", is a bolero written by Álvaro Carrillo around 1965. Alan Bernstein wrote the song's lyrics in English. It has become a Latin and jazz standard, having been featured as the theme song of films and telenovelas, as well as being covered by artists such as Frank Sinatra, who sang it to an arrangement by Billy May. It appeared on the Francis A. & Edward K. (Sinatra and Duke Ellington) album on Reprise. It has also been covered by Jerry Vale, the Sandpipers, Anita Bryant, Johnny Mann, Lenny Dee, Johnny Mathis, Jonah Jones, and Luis Miguel.
