= Contigo en la Distancia =

1946 bolero by César Portillo de la Luz

Song
- Language: Spanish
- Published: 1946
- Genre: Bolero
- Songwriter: César Portillo de la Luz

"Contigo En La Distancia" (With you in the distance) is a bolero which was written by the Cuban singer-songwriter César Portillo de la Luz when he was 24 years old. It was written in the year 1946.

Nowadays it is one of the most acclaimed boleros in Cuban music, having been interpreted by a multitude of singers such as Christina Aguilera, Il Divo, Pedro Infante, Pablo Milanés, Joan Manuel Serrat, Luis Miguel, Caetano Veloso, Plácido Domingo, José José, María Dolores Pradera and Belinda, Ana Belén, among others.

== Background and composition ==
"Contigo en la Distancia" was written by Cuban guitarist César Portillo de la Luz. Born in Havana, Cuba to a cigar-roller, Portillo taught himself play the guitar. At first, he painted houses to earn his living and would listen to jazz while working. Portillo de la Luz was introduced to filin (a form of bolero music influenced by jazz) by trovador musician Angel Díaz when Portillo de la Luz was performing at a friend's house. Diaz invited Portillo de la Luz to perform with the rest of the filin musicians at the Callejón de Hemmel. In 1946, he made his debut as a professional guitar player on radio and a weekly slot on Radio Mil Diez followed, which increased his popularity. "Contigo en la Distancia", recorded in the same year, was released when filin was gaining popularity in Cuba. Portillo de la Luz's recording of the song was included on a compilation album titled Un Momento con Portillo de la Luz.

== Performers ==
=== Luis Miguel version ===
"Contigo en la Distancia"

Single by Luis Miguel

from the album Romance
- Released: July 1992
- Recorded: 1991, Ocean Way Recording (Hollywood, California)
- Genre: Bolero
- Length: 3:23
- Label: WEA Latina
- Songwriter: César Portillo de la Luz
- Producers: Armando Manzanero; Luis Miguel

Luis Miguel singles chronology
"No Sé Tú" (1992)	"Contigo en la Distancia" (1992)	"América, América" (1992)

Mexican singer Luis Miguel released the 1991 album Romance, which was produced by Miguel and Mexican singer-songwriter Armando Manzanero, and included a selection of classic boleros. The success of the album revived the interest for bolero, even though the new musical arrangements of the songs make them unrecognizable. Romance received a Grammy Award nomination for Best Latin Pop Performance (which it lost to Jon Secada's Otro Día Más Sin Verte), was certified platinum by the Recording Industry Association of America and sold seven million copies worldwide. "Contigo en la Distancia" was released as the album's third single in Mexico in July 1992. The music video for song was directed by Pedro Torres and filmed in Miami, it features Miguel and an orchestra performing in front of a building. Mark Holston reviewed Miguel's cover version positively in the magazine Américas as "among the great ballads of all time and Miguel pays them full respect".

A live version of "Contigo en la Distancia" was included on the EP América & En Vivo in 1992 and its music video was added to the video compilation album Grandes Éxitos in 2005.

=== Christina Aguilera version ===
"Contigo en la Distancia"

Song by Christina Aguilera

from the album Mi Reflejo
- Released: 2000
- Length: 3:04
- Label: RCA
- Songwriter: César Portillo de la Luz
- Producer: Rudy Pérez

Licensed audio
- "Contigo en la Distancia" on YouTube

In 2000, American recording artist Christina Aguilera covered "Contigo en la Distancia" on her second studio album Mi Reflejo which was produced by Rudy Pérez. According to Aguilera, she wanted to record the song after hearing Pérez play it during a recording session break.

Aguilera's cover received mixed reactions from music critics. In the review for Mi Reflejo, an editor for Billboard called Aguilera's rendition the "most breathtaking cover" of the song while Eliseo Cardona of CDNow referred to it as the "album's finest moments". However, Ernesto Lechner of the Los Angeles Times criticized her vocals in the song and felt she "turns a gem of understatement into bloated confection". Kembrew McLeod wrote for Sonic.net opined that the usage of the Spanish guitars did not make the song authentically "Latin" while Kurt B. Reighley from Wall of Sound also criticized Aguilera's vocals by calling it "over the top" and stated she "cranks up her volume to ear-shattering levels, trying to wring emotion from each syllable in the same way that ordinary mortals squeeze dishwater from a sponge". Aguilera herself called "Contigo en la Distancia" her personal favorite song from Mi Reflejo.

In December 2019, Aguilera performed the song, along with "Falsas Esperanzas" and "Pero Me Acuerdo de Ti", during the Mexican leg of her concert tour, The X Tour. In July 2021, she performed "Contigo en la Distancia" for two nights at the Hollywood Bowl with Gustavo Dudamel and the Los Angeles Philharmonic.

=== Il Divo version ===
"Contigo en la Distancia"

Single by Il Divo

from the album Amor & Pasión
- Released: November 2015
- Recorded: 2015, México
- Genre: Classical crossover
- Label: Sony; Syco; Columbia
- Songwriter: César Portillo de la Luz
- Producer: Julio Reyes Copello

- Il Divo, the vocal quartet of male singers; Swiss tenor Urs Buhler, Spanish baritone Carlos Marin, American tenor David Miller and French pop singer Sébastien Izambard, along with Colombian producer winner of multiple Grammy Latino Julio Reyes Copello, recorded the song for the album Amor & Pasión from Il Divo (2015).

=== Other versions ===
==== José José ====
«Contigo en la distancia» is a cover of the Mexican singer José José included on his 1973 album "Hasta que vuelvas", under the RCA Victor record label. José José helped popularize the song worldwide by placing the singer and the song in the first places of popularization.

==== Plácido Domingo ====
«Contigo en la distancia» is a cover of the Spanish tenor Plácido Domingo for his album titled Passion published on January 29, 2013, produced by David Foster.+

==== María Dolores Pradera ====
«With you in the distance» is a cover of the singer María Dolores Pradera for his album titled sing You a bolero published in 2008 in collaboration with The Sabandeños. Later it goes back to record in 2013 for the disk Thanks to you to duet with Sole Giménez.

==== Other interpreters ====
Only it shows some of the most stood out interpretations

- David Archuleta
- David Bisbal
- David Lee Garza
- Andrea Bocelli
- Dyango
- José Feliciano
- Olga Guillot
- Pedro Infante
- Eugenia Leon
- Los Machucambos
- Armando Manzanero
- Ricardo Montaner
- Belinda
- Luis Salinas
- Susana Zabaleta
- Lucho Gatica
