= Nelson Oliveira Pesquisa e Estudo de Mercado =

Nelson Oliveira Pesquisa e Estudo de Mercado (Nopem) is an institute that surveys record sales and the most played songs in Brazil. The institute started its activities in 1964, and its survey takes into account stores in Rio de Janeiro and São Paulo.

== History ==
The first chart of most played songs was released on December 28, 1964, recording the most popular songs in Rio de Janeiro.

Lists of the 50 most sold phonograms (LP, single, K7, and double single) of each year started to be published from 1965.

Nopem's lists do not provide the quantities of records sold, only the names of the 50 best-selling titles per year. Despite the limited information, the lists (along with those of Pro-Música Brasil) constitute one of the only reliable research documents on record sales in the Brazilian phonographic market.

The weekly lists have been published in newspapers such as Folha de S.Paulo and Jornal do Brasil, and have also been used by TV Globo in some of its programs.

One of the criticisms of the organization is that the survey is not representative, as it reflects only the markets of the two largest cities in the country, ignoring the rest of Brazil.
