= La Más Perfecta Colección =

Compilation album by Mónica Naranjo
- Released: 6 December 2011
- Recorded: 1994–2011
- Genre: Latin pop; dance; pop rock
- Label: Sony

Mónica Naranjo chronology
Tarántula (2008)	La Más Perfecta Colección (2011)	Esencial (2013)

La Más Perfecta Colección is the third greatest hits compilation by Spanish recording artist Mónica Naranjo released on 6 December 2011 through Sony. The album includes most of her hits from her five studio albums and "Enamorada de Ti", which was included on her compilation Colección Privada (2005), and also includes one new track, "Emperatriz de Mis Sueños", which was used as the theme song for the Mexican telenovela Emperatriz. The album also includes a bonus DVD with music videos and live performances from her hits.

== Track listing ==
La Más Perfecta Colección – CD 1
No.	Title	Album	Length
1.	"El Amor Coloca"	Mónica Naranjo (1994)	4:02
2.	"Solo Se Vive una Vez"	Mónica Naranjo	4:10
3.	"Oyeme"	Mónica Naranjo	4:52
4.	"Sola"	Mónica Naranjo	4:02
5.	"Supernatural"	Mónica Naranjo	3:59
6.	"Desatame"	Palabra de mujer (1997)	4:47
7.	"Empiezo a Recordarte"	Palabra de mujer	4:08
8.	"Las Campanas del Amor"	Palabra de mujer	4:08
9.	"Miedo"	Palabra de mujer	3:39
10.	"Ámame o Déjame"	Palabra de mujer	4:57
11.	"Sobreviviré"	Minage (2000)	4:55
12.	"Enamorada" (Spanglish Version)	Minage	4:21
13.	"No Voy a Llorar"	Chicas Malas (2001)	4:00
14.	"Chicas Malas"	Chicas Malas	3:53
15.	"Enamorada de Ti"	Colección Privada (2005)	4:13
16.	"Europa"	Tarántula (2008)	7:07
17.	"Emperatriz de Mis Sueños"	Previously unreleased (2011)	4:15

La Más Perfecta Colección – CD 2 (DVD)
No.	Title	Length
1.	"Solo Se Vive Una Vez" (music video)	4:05
2.	"Óyeme" (Live performance: Adagio Tour)	5:28
3.	"Sola" (music video)	4:05
4.	"Desatame" (music video)	4:49
5.	"Empiezo A Recordarte" (music video)	4:09
6.	"Ámame o Déjame" (Live performance: Adagio Tour)	8:13
7.	"Pantera En Libertad" (music video)	4:43
8.	"Sobreviviré" (music video)	4:57
9.	"Enamorada" (Spanish Version) (music video)	4:21
10.	"No Voy A Llorar" (music video)	4:37
11.	"Europa" (Live performance: Adagio Tour)	5:59
12.	"Para Siempre" (Live performance: Stage Tour)	5:11
13.	"Siempre Fuiste Mío" (Live performance: Adagio Tour)	6:44
14.	"If You Leave Me Now" (Live performance: Minage Tour)	3:59
15.	"Perra Enamorada" (music video)	5:00
16.	"I Ain't Gonna Cry (Steelworks Mix Radio Edit)" (music video)	3:49
