= Esencial (Mónica Naranjo album) =

Esencial: Mónica Naranjo

Compilation album by Mónica Naranjo
- Released: 18 June 2013
- Recorded: 1994–2011
- Genre: Latin pop; dance; pop rock
- Label: Legacy; Sony

Mónica Naranjo chronology
| La Más Perfecta Colección (2011) | Esencial: Mónica Naranjo (2013) | 4.0 (2014) |

Esencial: Mónica Naranjo is the fourth greatest hits compilation by Spanish recording artist Mónica Naranjo released on 11 June 2013 through Legacy and Sony. The album includes all her hits, including promotional singles, three remixes, plus two songs which were never included in any of her albums, "Dream Alive" (2011) featuring Brian Cross, and "Insensatez", from the compilation album Samba Pa Ti (2005).

== Track listing ==
Esencial: Mónica Naranjo – CD 1
| No. | Title | Album | Length |
|---|---|---|---|
| 1. | "Desatame" | Palabra de mujer (1997) | 4:45 |
| 2. | "Amor y Lujo" | Tarántula (2008) | 3:48 |
| 3. | "No Voy a Llorar" | Chicas Malas (2001) | 3:58 |
| 4. | "Enamorada" (Spanish Version) | Minage (2000) | 4:21 |
| 5. | "Solo Se Vive una Vez" | Mónica Naranjo (1994) | 4:10 |
| 6. | "Pantera en Libertad" | Palabra de mujer (1997) | 4:42 |
| 7. | "Chicas Malas" | Chicas Malas (2001) | 3:53 |
| 8. | "Europa" | Tarántula (2008) | 7:10 |
| 9. | "If You Leave Me Now" | Minage (2000) | 3:33 |
| 10. | "Sola" | Mónica Naranjo (1994) | 4:05 |
| 11. | "Sacrificio" | Chicas Malas (2001) | 4:16 |
| 12. | "Usted" | Tarántula (2008) | 3:45 |
| 13. | "Dream Alive" (featuring Brian Cross) | Single release (2011) | 4:23 |
| 14. | "Kambalaya" (Remix Extended) | Tarántula (2008) | 6:20 |
| 15. | "Todo Mentira" (David Ferrero Remix) | Tarántula (2008) | 4:58 |

Esencial: Mónica Naranjo – CD 2
| No. | Title | Album | Length |
|---|---|---|---|
| 1. | "Sobreviviré" | Minage (2000) | 4:55 |
| 2. | "Entender el Amor" | Palabra de mujer (1997) | 5:22 |
| 3. | "Todo Mentira" | Tarántula (2008) | 3:47 |
| 4. | "El Amor Coloca" | Mónica Naranjo (1994) | 4:05 |
| 5. | "Para Siempre" | Tarántula (2008) | 5:12 |
| 6. | "De Que Me Sirve Ya" | Chicas Malas (2001) | 4:37 |
| 7. | "Empiezo a Recordarte" | Palabra de mujer (1997) | 4:07 |
| 8. | "Que Imposible" | Minage (2000) | 4:03 |
| 9. | "Supernatural" | Mónica Naranjo (1994) | 3:57 |
| 10. | "Tu y Yo Volvemos al Amor" | Palabra de mujer (1997) | 4:30 |
| 11. | "Seguire Sin Ti" ("If You Leave Me Now" Spanish Version) | Minage (2000) | 3:35 |
| 12. | "Ain't It Better Like This" | Chicas Malas (2001) | 3:50 |
| 13. | "Insensatez" | Samba Pa Ti by Various Artists (2005) | 3:38 |
| 14. | "Idilio" | Tarántula (2008) | 4:25 |
| 15. | "Desatame" (Latins Do It Better Club Mix) | Mónica Naranjo (Remixes) (1997) | 5:33 |

== Release history ==
| Country | Date | Format | Label |
|---|---|---|---|
| Spain | June 11, 2013 | CD / Digital download | Legacy |
| Worldwide | June 18, 2013 | CD / Digital download | Sony |
