= 4.0 (Mónica Naranjo album) =

Compilation album by Mónica Naranjo
- Released: May 5, 2014
- Genre: Dance; Synthpop
- Label: Sony Music Spain; Legacy
- Producer: Chris Gordon; Emily Lazar

Mónica Naranjo chronology
| Esencial (2013) | 4.0 (2014) |

4.0 is a compilation album by Spanish recording singer-songwriter Mónica Naranjo. The album was released through Sony Music Spain and Legacy on May 6, 2014. The album contains 4.0 re-recorded versions of tracks from her studio albums—Mónica Naranjo (1994), Palabra de mujer (1997), Minage (2000) and Tarántula (2008)—and a 4.0 version of "Make You Rock". "Solo Se Vive una Vez (4.0 Version)" was released as the first single from the album on March 31, 2014.

== Track listing ==
| No. | Title | Length |
|---|---|---|
| 1. | "Desatame / Intro (4.0 Version)" | 6:29 |
| 2. | "Solo Se Vive una Vez (4.0 Version)" | 4:14 |
| 3. | "Todo Mentira (4.0 Version)" | 4:01 |
| 4. | "Entender el Amor (4.0 Version)" | 6:16 |
| 5. | "Europa (4.0 Version)" | 6:25 |
| 6. | "Pantera en Libertad (4.0 Version)" | 4:37 |
| 7. | "Usted (4.0 Version)" | 4:23 |
| 8. | "Kambalaya (4.0 Version)" | 5:26 |
| 9. | "Amor y Lujo (4.0 Version)" | 4:42 |
| 10. | "Sobreviviré (4.0 Version)" | 5:10 |

Bonus track
| No. | Title | Length |
|---|---|---|
| 11. | "Make You Rock (4.0 Version)" | 3:45 |

== Charts ==
| Chart (2014) | Peak position |
|---|---|
| Spanish Albums Chart | 1 |
