= Colección Privada =

Compilation album by Mónica Naranjo
- Released: 27 April 2005
- Recorded: 10 October 2000 (Tour Minage) (Palacio de los Deportes; Madrid, Spain)
- Length: 2:20:38
- Label: Sony; Locomotive; Dynamo; Columbia; Ryco

Mónica Naranjo chronology
Bad Girls (2002)	Colección Privada (2005)	Tarántula (2008)

Alternative Cover
- Tour Minage Edition

Singles from Colección Privada
- 1. "Enamorada de Ti" Released: 18 April 2005

Colección Privada is a greatest hits and remix compilation album by Spanish singer Mónica Naranjo, released in 2005 by Sony Music Spain to celebrate 10 years of her musical career.

The compilation includes her most successful singles, remixes, and previously unreleased material, including the single “Enamorada de Ti”. A special edition also features a DVD with music videos and live performances.

The album was released following the commercial disappointment of her 2001 English-language album Bad Girls and during a hiatus from new studio material that lasted until 2008. It also served as a retrospective, summarizing Naranjo’s career up to that point and effectively closing the chapter on her dance-pop era while she prepared for her more experimental project, Tarántula.

The previously unreleased track “Enamorada de Ti” was promoted ahead of the album’s release, appearing on radio and included in the compilation’s track listing.

The album has been described by the press as a summary of Naranjo’s early mainstream pop period and a bridge to her later, more independent and experimental work.

The album reached number three on the Spanish Albums Chart and was certified platinum in Spain, with sales exceeding 100,000 copies.

According to contemporary reports, Colección Privada was released as part of the finalization of Naranjo’s contract with Sony BMG, after the label rejected early versions of what would later become Tarántula for being too experimental. The compilation marked the end of her relationship with the label and allowed her to pursue new artistic directions.

== Track listing ==
Colección Privada – Grandes Éxitos CD 1
No.	Title	Album	Length
1.	"Enamorada de Ti"	Previously unreleased	4:13
2.	"Sobreviviré"	Minage	4:58
3.	"Desátame"	Palabra de mujer	4:45
4.	"Pantera en Libertad"	Palabra de mujer	4:42
5.	"Entender el Amor"	Palabra de mujer	5:24
6.	"Chicas Malas"	Chicas Malas	3:53
7.	"Tú y Yo Volveremos al Amor"	Palabra de mujer	4:30
8.	"Empiezo a Recordarte"	Palabra de mujer	4:07
9.	"Enamorada" (Spanish version)	Minage	4:21
10.	"No Voy a Llorar"	Chicas Malas	3:59
11.	"El Amor Coloca"	Mónica Naranjo	4:01
12.	"Seguiré Sin Ti" ("If You Leave Me Now" Spanish version)	Minage	3:35
13.	"Las Campanas del Amor"	Palabra de mujer	4:06
14.	"Ámame O Déjame"	Palabra de mujer	4:58
15.	"No Puedo Seguir"	Chicas Malas	4:25
16.	"Sacrificio"	Chicas Malas	4:14
17.	"Supernatural"	Mónica Naranjo	3:57
18.	"Sola"	Mónica Naranjo	4:08

Colección Privada – Remixes CD 2
No.	Title	Length
1.	"Enamorada de Ti" (Kai Miller's Intimate Moment)	6:10
2.	"Chicas Malas" (Ferrero & Del Moral Single Remix)	4:52
3.	"Desátame" (Latins Do It Better Club Mix)	5:31
4.	"Sacrificio" (Corky Mix)	3:26
5.	"No Voy a Llorar" (LA Fabrique du Son Weekend Remix)	5:07
6.	"If You Leave Me Now" (Ferrero & Del Moral Extended Remix)	7:23
7.	"Pantera en Libertad" (Dub Apollo 440)	4:55
8.	"No Puedo Seguir" (Ferrero & Del Moral Spanish Batucada Remix)	4:27
9.	"Sobreviviré" (Pumpin' Dolls Armaggedon Club Mix)	7:33
10.	"No Voy a Llorar" (Wally López & Dr. Kucho Weekend Remix)	4:54
11.	"Entender el Amor" (Ferrero & Del Moral Xtended Remix)	7:43

Colección Privada – Music Videos CD 3
No.	Title	Length
1.	"Sólo Se Vive Una Vez"
2.	"Sola"
3.	"Pantera en Libertad"
4.	"Desátame"
5.	"Empiezo a Recordarte"
6.	"Sobreviviré"
7.	"Enamorada"
8.	"Perra Enamorada" (previously unreleased)
9.	"No Voy a Llorar"
10.	"I Ain't Gonna Cry (Steelworks Mix Radio Edit)"

Colección Privada – Tour Minage (CD+DVD)
No.	Title	Length
1.	"Entender el Amor"	6:39
2.	"If You Leave Me Now"	3:58
3.	"Sólo Se Vive Una Vez"	5:05
4.	"Empiezo a Recordarte"	4:44
5.	"Ahora, Ahora"	4:39
6.	"Perra Enamorada"	5:17
7.	"Enamorada"	5:54
8.	"Abismo"	6:02
9.	"Pantera en Libertad"	5:39
10.	"Inmensidad"	5:34
11.	"Que Imposible"	4:07
12.	"Amando Locamente"	4:48
13.	"Desátame"	5:09
14.	"Sobreviviré"	8:30

== Release history ==
Country	Date	Format	Label	Version	
Spain	5 May 2005	CD / Digital download	Locomotive	Standard Edition (Double CD; Grandes éxitos and remixes)	
Worldwide	5 May 2005	CD / Digital download / DVD	Sony	Deluxe Edition (Standard Edition + Videoclips)	
Worldwide	5 May 2005	CD / Digital download / DVD	Sony	Edición Coleccionista (Box Set 3 CD + Tour Minage)	
Spain	5 May 2005	CD / Digital download / DVD	Sony	9 October 2010	Tour Minage (CD + DVD)
United Kingdom	14 October 2005	CD / Digital download / DVD	Columbia	Standard Edition	
Canada	21 February 2006	CD / Digital download / DVD	Dynamo	Standard Edition	
Spain	26 February 2006	CD / Digital download / DVD	Dynamo	Tour Minage (CD + DVD)	
United States	16 October 2016	CD / Digital download / DVD	Ryko	Tour Minage (CD + DVD)	
United States	27 February 2015	CD / Digital download / DVD	Ryko		

== Charts ==
Chart (2005)	Peak position
Spanish Albums Chart	3
