= Grandes éxitos =

Grandes éxitos or Grandes Éxitos may refer to:

- Greatest hits album, referred to in Spanish as álbum de grandes éxitos
- Grandes Éxitos (Billo album) (1996)
- Grandes éxitos (Chayanne album) (2002)
- Grandes éxitos (Jarabe de Palo album) (2003)
- Grandes Éxitos (Luis Miguel album) (2005)
- Grandes éxitos (Los Prisioneros album) (1991)
- Grandes Éxitos (Mónica Naranjo album) (2002)
- Grandes Éxitos (Shakira album) (2002)
- Grandes Exitos (Westlife album) (2002)
- Grandes Éxitos 1991–2004, an album by Alejandro Sanz
- Oro: Grandes Éxitos, a compilation album by ABBA
- Mucho Azúcar – Grandes Éxitos, an album by Azúcar Moreno
- Grandes Éxitos, a 1984 album by Gary Low

== See also ==
- Éxitos (disambiguation)
- Éxitos Originales (disambiguation)
- 14 Grandes Éxitos, an album by Luis Miguel
- Los grandes éxitos en español, a 1999 album by Cypress Hill
- 20 Grandes Éxitos (Los Fabulosos Cadillacs)
- 20 Grandes Éxitos (Enanitos Verdes album)
- 20 – Grandes Éxitos (Laura Pausini album) or 20 – The Greatest Hits
