= Éxitos =

Éxitos ("Hits" in Spanish) may refer to:

- Éxitos (Don Chezina album), 2004
- Exitos (Electric Company album), 2000
- Éxitos (Fey album), 2000
- Éxitos (Tempo album), 2002
- Éxitos de Floria Márquez
- Éxitos de Gloria Estefan
- Éxitos 98:06, by Luis Fonsi
- Todos Éxitos, by Diego Torres

== Other albums ==
- 10 Éxitos de Juan Gabriel
- 12 Super Éxitos, an album by Selena
- 12 Super Éxitos (Barrio Boyzz album)
- 15 Éxitos (disambiguation)
- 15 años de éxitos, by Alejandro Fernández
- Mis Mejores Canciones – 17 Super Éxitos by Selena
- Mis Mejores Canciones: 17 Super Éxitos, by Manuel Mijares
- 20 Años de Éxitos En Vivo con Moderatto, by Alejandra Guzmán
- Personalidad: 20 Éxitos, by Ana Gabriel
- 30 Éxitos Insuperables (disambiguation)

== See also ==
- Éxitos y Más (disambiguation)
- Grandes Éxitos (disambiguation)
- Éxitos y Recuerdos, a series of compilation albums released by EMI and Capitol Records
