= Grandes Éxitos (Mónica Naranjo album) =

Compilation album by Mónica Naranjo
- Released: September 30, 2002
- Recorded: 1994–97
- Genre: Latin pop; Dance
- Label: Sony

Mónica Naranjo chronology
Chicas Malas (2001)	Grandes Éxitos (2002)	Bad Girls (2002)

Grandes Éxitos is the first greatest hits compilation by Spanish recording artist Mónica Naranjo released on September 30, 2002 through Sony. The album includes most of her hits from her first studio albums Mónica Naranjo (1994) and Palabra de mujer (1997).

== Track listing ==
No.	Title	Length
1.	"El Amor Coloca"	4:01
2.	"Sola"	4:08
3.	"Óyeme"	4:38
4.	"Supernatural"	4:00
5.	"Dáme Tu Calor"	4:50
6.	"Fuego De Pasión (Love's About to Change My Heart)"	3:49
7.	"Llorando Bajo La Lluvia"	3:46
8.	"Sólo Se Vive Una Vez"	4:11
9.	"Hoy La Luna Sale Para Mí"	3:11
10.	"Desátame"	4:49
11.	"Empiezo A Recordarte"	4:09
12.	"Yo Vengo Y Tu Te Vas"	4:10
13.	"Amame O Dejame"	4:59
14.	"Pantera En Libertad"	4:43
15.	"Rezando En Soledad"	4:51
16.	"Las Campanas Del Amor"	4:08
17.	"Miedo"	3:40
18.	"Tu Y Yo Volvemos Al Amor"	4:32
