= Let the Love Begin =

Let the Love Begin may refer to:

- Let the Love Begin (film), a 2005 Philippine film
  - "Let the Love Begin", 2005 song by Kyla and the film's theme song (cover of the song from the 1986 American film Thrashin')
- Let the Love Begin (TV series), a 2015 Philippine TV series
- "Let the Love Begin", a song from the 1986 American film Thrashin'
- "Let the Love Begin", an English-language version of the Mónica Naranjo song "De Qué Me Sirve Ya" from Bad Girls
