= Palabra de Mujer =

Palabra de Mujer may refer to:

- Palabra de mujer (TV series)
- Palabra de Mujer (album)
