= 20 Grandes Éxitos =

20 Grandes Éxitos may refer to:

- 20 Grandes Éxitos (Los Fabulosos Cadillacs album)
- 20 Grandes Éxitos (Enanitos Verdes album) or 20 Éxitos Originales
- 20 – Grandes Éxitos (Laura Pausini album) or 20 – The Greatest Hits

== See also ==
- Grandes éxitos (disambiguation)
