= Éxitos Originales =

Éxitos Originales (Spanish "Original Hits") may refer to:

- Para Ti... 14 Éxitos Originales, a compilation album by Juan Gabriel from 1988

== 20 Éxitos Originales ==
Sony Music compilation releases:

- 20 Éxitos Originales (Enanitos Verdes album), 1995
- 20 Éxitos Originales, Azúcar Moreno 2005
- 20 Éxitos Originales, Leo Dan 2006
- 20 Éxitos Originales, José José 2005
- 20 Éxitos Originales, Dark Latin Groove 2005
- 20 Éxitos Originales, Willy Chirino 2006
- 20 Éxitos Originales, Desde El Principio 2005
- 20 Éxitos Originales, Lucero discography 2005
- 20 Éxitos Originales, Soda Stereo 2005
- 20 Éxitos Originales, Johnny Ventura 2006
- 20 Éxitos Originales, Fey discography 2005
- 20 Éxitos Originales, Jeanette (singer) 2005

== See also ==
- Éxitos (disambiguation)
