= 4.0 =

4.0 may refer to:

- 4 (disambiguation)
- 4.0 (Mónica Naranjo album), a 2014 compilation album by Spanish recording singer-songwriter Mónica Naranjo
- LP Underground 4.0, a 2004 CD and digital download set by Linkin Park Underground
- Live Free or Die Hard, a 2007 American action thriller film (released as Die Hard 4.0 outside North America)

== See also ==
- Industry 4.0
