= Greatest hits album =

Type of compilation album

A greatest hits album or best-of album is a type of compilation album that collects popular and commercially successful songs by a particular artist or band. While greatest hits albums are typically supported by the artist, they can also be created by record companies without express approval from the original artist as a means to generate sales. They are typically regarded as a good starting point for new fans of an artist, but are sometimes criticized by longtime fans as not inclusive enough or necessary at all.

It is also common for greatest hits albums to include new recordings, remixes or unreleased alternate takes of the hit songs, plus other new material as bonus tracks to increase appeal for longtime fans (who might otherwise already own the recordings included). At times, a greatest hits compilation marks the first album appearance of a successful single that was never attached to a previous studio album.

== History ==
The first greatest hits album was Johnny Mathis's Johnny's Greatest Hits, released in 1958. The album collected eight of Mathis's charting singles, as well as three non-charting B-sides and an altogether new track. The album spent three weeks at the number one spot on Billboard's Best Selling Pop LP's chart. The greatest hits album format then gained popularity in the 1960s and 1970s among American and British rock and pop artists. One notable example was the Beach Boys 1974 album Endless Summer, which upon release was certified 3× platinum by the Recording Industry Association of America. It propelled them from an opening act for Crosby, Stills, Nash & Young to headlining their own tour in just a matter of weeks. Some artists were even popular enough to release multiple greatest hits albums during and after their career.

Greatest hits compilations were sometimes also released as 4-track 7" vinyl EPs. In the late 1960s, EMI Sweden released a series of greatest hits-EPs featuring artists such as The Supremes, Ray Charles and Louis Armstrong.

By the 1990s, greatest hits albums were common for popular artists, with some artists even releasing the greatest hits album as a music video collection concurrently with the album. It also became a commercially viable option to boost popularity for artists with dwindling careers. Some bands refuse to release a greatest hits album, such as rock groups AC/DC, Tool, and Metallica. Garth Brooks had initially refused releasing one, but he eventually agreed to it in 1994 for a limited release (the resulting record, The Hits, sold over ten million copies).

In 2000, Sony Music Entertainment launched their The Essential series, which collects singles and other career-defining tracks of artists licensed to Sony. The Essential Bob Dylan was the first in the series, and the company has since released dozens of albums in the series with other artists under their label. In addition to artist-specific collections, the series has also released genre-specific and themed albums, such as The Essential Christmas (collecting pop and rock covers of Christmas songs) or The Essential Australian Rock (collecting a specific regional output). In 2005, Universal Music Group launched a similar line, Gold, which collects artists' greatest hits onto two discs.

In the late 2000s and 2010s, digital downloads and music streaming services increased in popularity, which allow users to listen to their favorite tracks without the need of a greatest hits package. In 2016, Pitchfork said that "in the digital era, once a catalog enters a streaming service or an MP3 store, there's no need for a reissue and, therefore, there's no reason for a label to mine the vaults, searching for old music to make new again. Users can assemble their own personalized greatest hits playlists or just scan through an act's most accessed songs", which has led to greatest hits collections becoming redundant.

Despite the popularity of streaming in the 2010s and early 2020s, some artists continued to issue physical greatest hits albums, including the White Stripes, Spoon, and the Weeknd. Spoon lead singer Britt Daniel said he chose to compile 2019's Everything Hits at Once: The Best of Spoon out of an affinity for compilations such as Standing on a Beach by the Cure and Substance 1987 by New Order, which had introduced him to those artists in his youth, and to provide an official introduction to Spoon's catalog for new listeners. Alex Kapranos of Franz Ferdinand echoed those sentiments when describing the decision to release the band's 2022 Hits to the Head compilation, stating that "I have friends who believe you're somehow not a 'real' fan if you own a best of rather than a discography. I disagree. I think of my parents' record collection as a kid. I loved their compilation LPs. I am so grateful that they had Changes or Rolled Gold. Those LPs were my entrance point. My introduction."

== Notable examples ==
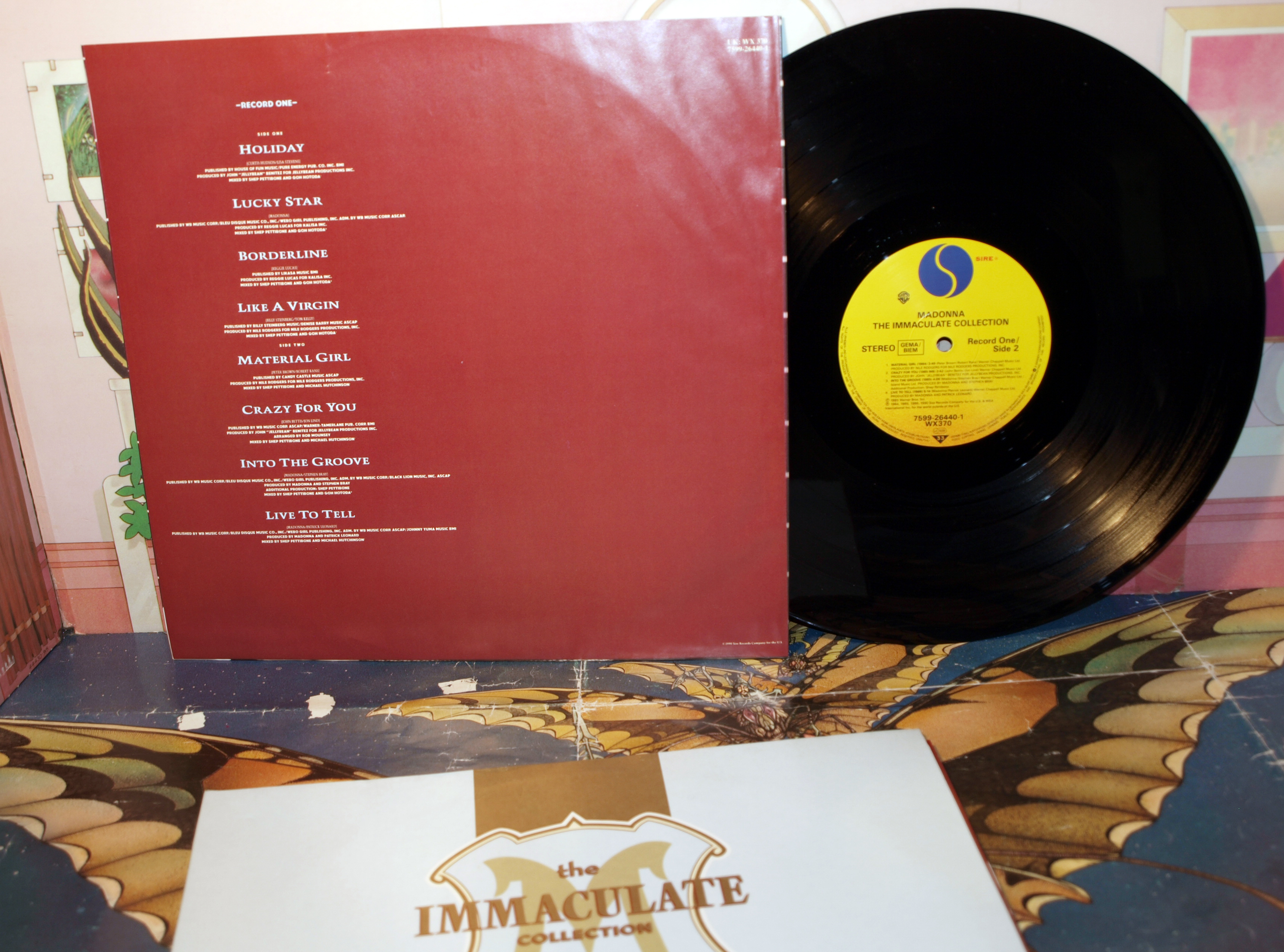
One of the vinyl pressings of The Immaculate Collection, the highest-selling compilation album by a female and solo artist.

Various compilation albums became amongst the best-selling albums worldwide with sales of over 20 million copies. For example, Eagles' Their Greatest Hits (1971–1975) is the best-selling album in the United States, according to Billboard, selling over 40 million copies. Worldwide, The Immaculate Collection by Madonna is the best-selling compilation by a solo artist, with 30 million copies, and is the best-selling compilation by a female artist in major music markets such as Australia, United Kingdom and United States. In the UK, Queen's Greatest Hits is the biggest selling album of all time. In second place is ABBA Gold, another greatest hits compilation which has gone on to become the longest-charting album in the UK. Queen's Greatest Hits II is also one of the UK's top ten biggest sellers.

One example of a greatest hits compilation released against the artists' intentions is British rock group the Rolling Stones' 1971 compilation Hot Rocks 1964–1971. The music magazine Rolling Stone remarked that the album served as a "beautifully packaged... purely mercenary item put together by former record executives of the Stones' to cash in on the Christmas season and wring some more bucks out in the name of the Mod Princes they once owned." After their management tricked the band into signing over the copyrights to their 1963–1970 song catalog, the band did succeed in changing management and major labels. However, they could neither prevent the release of Hot Rocks nor its successor, More Hot Rocks (Big Hits & Fazed Cookies). Hot Rocks remains the best-selling album of the Rolling Stones' career. Mick Jagger and Keith Richards continue to collect significant songwriting royalties from the Hot Rocks sales, but not the ownership royalties.

== In other media ==
The concept of greatest hits compilations has been adapted to other media as well. In television, some shows have released compilations of their critically successful and highest-rated episodes to drive new viewers to watch a program, such as Family Guy's Freakin' Sweet Collection and South Park: The Hits. Several video game companies have re-released popular games for continued sales, sometimes with discounted prices: Sony's PlayStation has released games under their Greatest Hits series; Nintendo has re-released games under the Nintendo Selects label (formerly called "Player's Choice"); and Microsoft has re-released games under the Platinum Hits label. Some video game franchises have released greatest hits collections of their own content, such as Super Mario All-Stars, Sonic Mega Collection, and Guitar Hero Smash Hits. Film studios also have participated in the practice, often including a number of films in one package (usually by decade) under an equivalent label to 'greatest hits' through optical physical media and often timed to a landmark anniversary, and digital purchase bundles in the same vein continue to exist.

== See also ==
- Hit record
- Grandes éxitos – the Spanish language equivalent of the concept
