= Sobreviviré (Mónica Naranjo song) =

Mónica Naranjo's song

Single by Mónica Naranjo

from the album Minage
- Language: Spanish
- Released: 26 February 2000
- Genre: Soft rock
- Length: 4:57
- Label: Sony
- Composer: Enrico Riccardi
- Lyricists: Luigi Albertelli; José Manuel Navarro
- Producer: Phil Manzanera

Mónica Naranjo singles chronology
| "Rezando en soledad" (1999) | "Sobreviviré" (2000) | "If You Leave Me Now" (2000) |

Music video
- "Sobreviviré" on YouTube

"Sobreviviré" (transl. 'I Will Survive') is song recorded by Mónica Naranjo. It was first broadcast on 26 February 2000, it is the first single off Naranjo's album Minage. It is a version of "Fiume azzurro" performed by Italian singer Mina and composed by Luigi Albertelli and Enrico Riccardi, in turn released on Mina's 1972 effort Cinquemilaquarantatre. The original lyrics were adapted by Naranjo's recurring collaborator José Manuel Navarro. It was produced by Phil Manzanera.

The song became a number 1 in Los 40 chart list on 6 May 2000. The song eventually became an LGBT anthem and is one of her biggest hits.

== Charts ==
=== Weekly charts ===
Weekly chart performance for "Sobreviviré"
| Chart (2000) | Peak position |
|---|---|
| Spain (Promusicae) | 1 |

=== Year-end charts ===
Year-end chart performance for "Sobreviviré"
| Chart (2000) | Position |
|---|---|
| Spain (PROMUSICAE) | 6 |
