= 30 Éxitos Insuperables =

30 Éxitos Insuperables (Spanish for: "30 Unbeatable Hits") refers to multiple compilation albums released from 2003 to 2004 by EMI, including:

- 30 Éxitos Insuperables (Luis Miguel album)
- 30 Éxitos Insuperables (Mijares album)
- 30 Éxitos Insuperables, by Los Alegres de Terán
- 30 Éxitos Insuperables, by Álvaro Torres
- 30 Éxitos Insuperables, by Los Ángeles Negros
- 30 Éxitos Insuperables, by Los Barón de Apodaca
- 30 Éxitos Insuperables, by Bobby Pulido
- 30 Éxitos Insuperables, by Daniela Romo
- 30 Éxitos Insuperables, by Los Donneños
- 30 Éxitos Insuperables, by Dyango
- 30 Éxitos Insuperables, by Eddie Santiago
- 30 Éxitos Insuperables, by Ednita Nazario
- 30 Éxitos Insuperables, by Emilio Navaira
- 30 Éxitos Insuperables, by Graciela Beltrán
- 30 Éxitos Insuperables, by Jailene Cintrón
- 30 Éxitos Insuperables, by Jon Secada
- 30 Éxitos Insuperables, by José Luis Perales
- 30 Éxitos Insuperables, by Laura Canales
- 30 Éxitos Insuperables, by Lorenzo de Monteclaro
- 30 Éxitos Insuperables, by Lucho Gatica
- 30 Éxitos Insuperables, by La Mafia
- 30 Éxitos Insuperables, by Mazz
- 30 Éxitos Insuperables, by Miguel Gallardo (singer)
- 30 Éxitos Insuperables, by Los Mismos
- 30 Éxitos Insuperables, by Nelson Ned
- 30 Éxitos Insuperables, by Paloma San Basilio
- 30 Éxitos Insuperables, by Pandora (musical group)
- 30 Éxitos Insuperables, by Paulina Rubio
- 30 Éxitos Insuperables, by Ram Herrera
- 30 Éxitos Insuperables, by Raphael (singer)
- 30 Éxitos Insuperables, by Salvatore Adamo
- 30 Éxitos Insuperables, by La Tropa F
- 30 Éxitos Insuperables, by Yuri (Mexican singer)
