= Romantico Desde Siempre =

Romantico Desde Siempre Volume 1 and 2, are a compilation of romantic songs from the first albums by Mexican singer Luis Miguel. The Volume 1 was released on November 29, 1994, and the Volume 2 on 1997, both by EMI Latin. The first volume peaked at No. 26 on the Top Latin Albums chart.

== Track listing - Volume 1 ==
1. "Rey de Corazones"
2. "Palabra de Honor"
3. "Isabel"
4. "La Chica del Bikini Azul"
5. "Hablame"
6. "Mentira"
7. "Fiebre de Amor"
8. "Directo Al Corazón"
9. "No Me Puedes Dejar Así"
10. "1+1=2 Enamorados"
11. "Lili"
12. "Los Muchachos de Hoy"

== Track listing - Volume 2 ==
1. "No Me Puedes Dejar Así"
2. "Decidete"
3. "Me Gustas Tal Como Eres"
4. "Tú No Tienes Corazón"
5. "Por Tí"
6. "Soy Como Soy"
7. "Hay un Algo"
8. "Amor de Escuela"
9. "Un Rock & Roll Sonó"
10. "Noi Raggazzi Di Oggi"
11. "Palabra de Honor"
12. "Me Muero Por Tí"
13. "Todo el Amor del Mundo"
14. "Ya Nunca Más"
15. "Marcela"
16. "Juego de Amigos"
17. "Recuerdos Encadenados"
