= Para Ti... 14 Éxitos Originales =

Para Ti 14 Exitos Originales

Compilation album by Juan Gabriel
- Released: 1988
- Recorded: 1971–1986
- Genre: Pop Latino, Mariachi
- Label: BMG Ariola

Para Ti 14 Exitos Originales is a compilation album released by Juan Gabriel in 1988.

== Track listing ==
All tracks are written by Juan Gabriel.

No.	Title	Length
1.	"Hasta Que Te Conoci"	7:11
2.	"El Noa Noa"	4:18
3.	"Inocente Pobre Amigo"	4:07
4.	"Cosas de Enamorados"	3:28
5.	"Buenos Dias Señor Sol"	2:42
6.	"Caray"	3:50
7.	"Siempre en Mi Mente"	3:27
8.	"Yo No Se Que Paso"	5:14
9.	"He Venido a Pedirte Perdon"	5:00
10.	"Querida"	5:19
11.	"Ya Para Que"	3:06
12.	"Tus Ojos Mexicanos Lindos"	5:00
13.	"No Me Vuelvo a Enamorar"	3:20
14.	"Cuando Quieras Dejame"	3:02

== Charts ==
Chart (1987–1988)	Peak position
US Latin Pop Albums (Billboard)	4

== Album certification ==
Region	Certification	Certified units/sales
United States (RIAA)	4× Platinum (Latin)	400,000^{^}
^{^} Shipments figures based on certification alone.
