= Éxitos y Más (disambiguation) =

Éxitos y Más (Spanish "Hits and More") is a 2006 album by Monchy & Alexandra.

Éxitos y Más may also refer to:

- Éxitos y Más, compilation album by Olga Tañón 1995
- Exitos y Mas, compilation album by Tito Rojas 2007
- Éxitos y Más, compilation album by Milly Quezada 2001
- Éxitos y Más, compilation album by Puerto Rican Power Orchestra 2006
- Éxitos y Más, compilation album by Lisandro Meza 2002
- Éxitos y Más Éxitos, compilation album by Vicente Fernández 1990
- Éxitos y Más Éxitos, compilation album by 2Mex
- Exitos Y Algo Mas, Oscar D'León 1991
