= Mónica Naranjo =

Spanish singer and songwriter

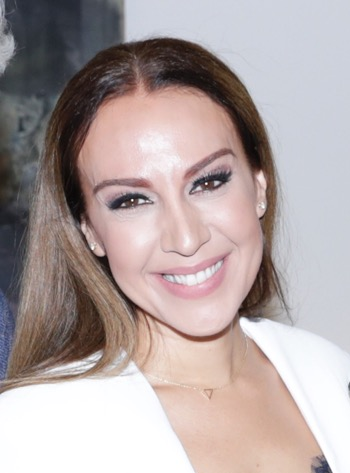
- Naranjo in 2017
- Born: Monica Naranjo Carrasco; 23 May 1974 (age 52); Figueres, Catalonia, Spain
- Spouses: Cristóbal Sansano (m. 1994; div. 2004) Óscar Tarruella (m. 2004; div. 2018)
- Children: 1
- Musical career
- Genres: Pop; rock
- Instruments: Vocals; keyboards
- Years active: 1994–present
- Labels: Epic, Sony Music, Ariola, BMG, Altafonte, Missis Oranges
- Website: monicanaranjo.com

Mónica Naranjo Carrasco (born 23 May 1974) is a Spanish singer widely popular in Spain and Latin America and recognised as one of the most powerful voices of the Spanish and Latin American music scenes. She has performed with singers such as Luciano Pavarotti, Rocío Jurado and Mina Mazzini amongst others.

== Biography ==
=== Early years ===
Mónica Naranjo was born in Figueres. Her parents, Francisco, a construction worker, and Patricia, a housewife, migrated from southern Spain (Seville and Málaga) to the north in the 1960s. Mónica, who is the oldest daughter in the family, has two younger siblings, Raquel and Enrique. Despite her troubled childhood, when she was only 4, she realised that music was her favourite activity.

At the age of 14, the young Mónica enrolled in a music school to learn singing, and she also was given a voice recorder as a present so that she could start composing and recording her own songs.

=== Pop career ===
She started singing at a very young age. Cristóbal Sánsano became her first producer. At 18, she emigrated to Mexico.

In 1994, she recorded her debut album, the self-titled Mónica Naranjo, after signing with Sony Music. The album resulted in the hit singles "Sola", "Solo se vive una vez", "El amor coloca", "Supernatural", "¡Óyeme!" and "Fuego de pasión". She was nominated for Eres Awards. Although the album went almost unnoticed in Spain, it had a great reception in Mexico, where it sold more than 900,000 copies.

In 1997, taking advantage of her popularity in Latin America, she released her second album, Palabra de Mujer. This time, the album was a hit not only in Mexico, but also in Spain, her home country. Managing to sell more than 2,000,000 copies. This success in Spain enabled the singer to return to her home country, and to perform in numerous TV programmes. The album was also successful in the United States, Latin America, thanks to singles such as "Entender el amor", "Desátame", "Pantera en libertad" and "Las campanas del amor". Due to the success of this album, she was awarded with the Amigo Award for the best Spanish female solo artist.

In 2000 she released her third album, Minage, a tribute to the Italian singer Mina. In an interview that year, she mentioned that the album was like nothing her producers expected:

They were expecting another Palabra de Mujer album, but more than just a hit, I wanted something to let the world know that I am also a fanatic, and that there are many great artists/singers out there who deserve more recognition. An example of such an artist is Mina Mazzini.

Minage was known for the song "Sobreviviré", a hit song that would turn into one of the most remembered and representative hits of the singer. This song, which is a cover of Mina Mazzini's "Fiume azurro" is not only considered a fight song, but also an LGBT anthem and a hymn against domestic violence. She performed that song during the "Pavarotti and Friends" gala, where she also performed "Agnus dei" in a duet with the Italian tenor.

In 2001, she released Chicas Malas, an album with several collaborations, among them Diane Warren, Gregg Alexander, John Reid, Cliff Masterson, Sam Watters, and many more. Having such worldwide-known influences, the commercial dance album sales were disappointing, having sold only 120,000 copies in its first year, making it the lowest-selling studio album in her Spanish-singing career.

In 2001, she decided to make a big leap into the English language public by recording the English version of "Chicas Malas" named "Bad Girls". The international push met very little support, although the song "I Ain't Gonna Cry" did get Mónica some recognition in continental Europe. The album was finally released in 2002, while in some countries it came out in 2003 and 2006. The album was out of print until 2019 and 2020.

=== Hiatus ===
After feeling overwhelmed by the music industry in general, and after thinking about her own personal life and career, the performer took the decision of moving away from the stage.

In 2005, after a long break from music, Mónica released a greatest hits album, Colección Privada, a big success that also included one new release "Enamorada de ti". With this album, Mónica closed a stage in her life and career. In December 2005, she sang "Punto de partida" as a duet with Rocío Jurado in a TV homage titled Rocío... Siempre. In 2004, she recorded a version of Insensatez, from Mina for her album, Sampa Pa Ti. In 2006, she announced she was recording what would be Tarantula, her next album, and in 2007 the participated in a Spanish TV Program called "Sorpresa Sorpresa." She also made some red carpet appearances.

=== Return ===
On 29 February 2008, her new single Europa was officially launched on her official site climbing to No. 1 in the Spanish Single Charts. The Album Tarántula was made available in stores on 22 April 2008. This album, which marked her return to music after almost seven years reached number 1 in Spain, and was certified Platinum. Later, she released a limited special edition of the album, with a DVD and a photographic book of pictures of the Tarántula era.

Following the success of her latest album Tarántula, Mónica Naranjo embarked on the tour Adagio Tour in which she offered a new vision of her songs and symphonic CD + DVD is a reflection of this journey. The concert included in this album was recorded on 16 October 2009 at the Teatro de la Ciudad de México, with the Philharmonic Orchestra of Mexico City, one of the most prestigious in America, directed by Pepe Herrero, who also signed the new orchestral arrangements. The 16-track CD was mixed and mastered by John M. Vinader. It was released in Mexico and the U.S.

Thanks to the success of Tarántula, in 2010 the singer partnered with Studio Kawaii, (a Madrid-based studio specialised in manga style comics) and released simultaneously two comics, the semiautobiographical "Amor y lujo" and the fictional and futuristic "Todo mentira". Some years she started new projects and also released a recipe book.

In 2011, she sang the theme song for Mexican telenovela Emperatriz and in 2012, she released A Opera-Rock, accompanying a novel in Spanish with a few strokes in other languages. It was co-produced by Mónica and by Óscar Tarruella, and arrangements were by Pepe Herrero and Chris Gordon. The release originally due in 2010 was postponed for release to February 2016 which finally had the title of Lubna, based on a same name novel.

=== New projects ===
In 2014, Mónica was part of the jury of the programme Tu cara me suena (Your face sounds familiar to me) which was broadcast by Antena 3. That same year, she was also a juror in the Spanish selection for the Eurovision Song Contest, which was won by Ruth Lorenzo, with whom she would perform in future concerts.

In 2017, she was also a juror in Operación Triunfo 2018, whose participation was controversial due to her sincere but also severe critics to the participating performers.

In 2019, Mónica debuted her new television show called Mónica y el Sexo (Sex and Mónica) on which the performer talks openly about the problems brought by her recent divorce from Óscar Tarruella who had been her husband for 16 years. Her song "Tú y yo y el loco amor" (You and me and that crazy love) was released as the principal song of the OST of the same name film. After that, she started working in a new project called "Mes Excentricités", a project that will be split in three EP's, of which the first one, entitled "Le psiquiatrique" will be released in middle 2019. The first single entitled "Doble Corazón" will be released during the Gay Pride parade in Madrid.

In 2020, the singer presented the popular but at the same time controversial reality show "La isla de las tentaciones" (Temptation island) and also performed the opening theme of the program. At the same time, she worked on the second volume of the EP series "Mes Excentricités" entitled "Les quatre saisons". This second volume will feature a cover of Radiohead's song Creep.

Mónica released her new single from the album, Mimétika, released in 2022, "Lagrimas de un Angel" on November 4.

== Discography ==
=== Studio albums ===
Year	Title	Details	Chart positions		Certifications (sales thresholds)	Sales
Year	Title	Details	MEX	SPA	Certifications (sales thresholds)	Sales
1994	Mónica Naranjo	First studio album; Released: 14 June 1994; Label: Epic, Sony Music	—	—	US: Platinum (Latin)	MEX: 900,000
1997	Palabra de Mujer	Second studio album; Released: 27 May 1997; Label: Epic, Sony Music	—	2	IFPI Europe: Platinum; SPA: 10× Platinum; U.S.: Platinum (Latin)	MEX: 700,000; SPA: 1.3 million; U.S.: 71,000
2000	Minage	Third studio album; Released: 16 March 2000; Label: Epic, Sony Music	—	1	MEX: Gold; SPA: 3xPlatinum	Global: 1 million; MEX: 75,000; SPA: 300,000
2001	Chicas Malas	Fourth studio album; Released: 26 October 2001; Label: Epic, Sony Music	—	4	SPA: Gold	SPA: 200,000
2002	Bad Girls	Fifth studio album; Released: 12 November 2002 (Spain); Label: Epic, Sony Music	—	—		
2008	Tarántula	Sixth studio album; Released: 12 April 2008; Label: Ariola, BMG	30	1	SPA: Platinum	SPA: 80,000
2016	Lubna	Seventh studio album; Released: 29 January 2016; Label: Sony Music	49	1	SPA: Platinum	SPA: 40,000
2019	Mes Excentricités Vol. 1: Le Psychiatrique	Extended play; Released: 11 October 2019; Label: Sony Music	—	1		
2020	Mes Excentricités Vol. 2: Les Quatre Saisons	Extended play; Released: 26 June 2020; Label: Sony Music	—	6		
2022	Mimétika	Eighth studio album; Released: 10 June 2022; Label: Altafonte, Sony Music	—	2		
"—" denotes releases that did not chart, were not released or information is not available.

=== Compilations ===
Year	Title	Details	Chart positions		Certifications (sales thresholds)	Sales
Year	Title	Details	MEX	SPA	Certifications (sales thresholds)	Sales
2005	Colección Privada	Released: 27 April 2005; 2nd compilation album	–	3		Worldwide: 100,000
2011	La Más Perfecta Colección	Released: 6 December 2011; 3rd compilation album	–	–		
2013	Esencial	Released: 11 June 2013; 4th compilation album	–	27		
2014	4.0	Released: 6 May 2014; 5th compilation album	54	1		
2019	Renaissance	Released: 15 November 2019; 6th compilation album	–	1		

=== Live albums ===
Year	Album	SPA	MEX	Sales
2009	Stage: Released: 22 March 2009; 1st live album	1	31	
2009	Adagio: Released: 1 December 2009	9	55	

=== Singles ===
Year	Single	ES	Album
1994	"El amor coloca"	—	Mónica Naranjo
1994	"Sólo se vive una vez"	—	Mónica Naranjo
1994	"Sola"	—	Mónica Naranjo
1994	"Fuego de pasión"	—	Mónica Naranjo
1994	"Óyeme"	—	Mónica Naranjo
1995	"Supernatural"	—	Mónica Naranjo
1995	"Llorando bajo la lluvia"	—	Mónica Naranjo
1997	"Entender el amor"	5	Palabra De Mujer
1997	"Desátame"	2	Palabra De Mujer
1997	"Empiezo a recordarte"	—	Palabra De Mujer
1997	"Pantera en libertad"	7	Palabra De Mujer
1997	"Las campanas del amor"	5	Palabra De Mujer
1997	"Ámame o déjame"	—	Palabra De Mujer
1997	"Tú y yo volvemos al amor"	—	Palabra De Mujer
1997	"Rezando en soledad"	—	Palabra De Mujer
2000	"Sobreviviré"	1	Minage
2000	"If You Leave Me Now/Seguire sin ti"	1	Minage
2000	"Perra enamorada"	—	Minage
2000	"Enamorada"	2	Minage
2001	"Chicas malas"	3	Chicas Malas
2002	"Sacrificio"	3	Chicas Malas
2002	"No voy a llorar"	4	Chicas Malas
2002	"Ain't It Better Like This"	10	Chicas Malas
2002	"I Ain't Gonna Cry"	—	Bad Girls
2002	"Santa Señal / Shake The House"	—	The Official Album of the 2002 FIFA World Cup
2005	"Enamorada de ti"	1	Colección Privada
2008	"Europa"	1	Tarántula
2008	"Amor y lujo"	1	Tarántula
2012	"Make You Rock"	11	Single-only
2014	"Sólo se vive una vez (4.0 Version)"	4	4.0
2015	"Jamás"	2	Lubna
2016	"Fin"	—	Lubna
2016	"Perdida"	—	Lubna
2019	"Tu, Yo y el loco amor"	—	Salir del ropero film OST.
2019	"Doble Corazón"	—	Mes excentricites: Vol 1: Le Psychiatrique
2019	"Libre amar"	1	Mes excentricites: Vol 1: Le Psychiatrique
2020	"¡Hoy No! (Never Trust A Stranger)"	—	Mes excentricites: Vol 2: Les Quatre Saisons

(—) means the singles did not chart or were not eligible to chart, as they were sent only as a promo to radios.

== Tours ==
- 1995/1996 – Mónica Naranjo Tour (America)
- 1998, 1999 – Tour Palabra de mujer (Spain/America)
- 2000 – Tour Minage (Spain)
- 2008 – Tarántula Tour (Spain)
- 2009/2010 – Adagio Tour (Spain/America)
- 2011/2012 – Madame Noir (Spain/America)
- 2014 – Mónica Naranjo: 4.0 Tour (Spain)
- 2019/2020 – Mónica Naranjo: Renaissance (Spain/America)

== Other works ==
=== Television ===
- El Número Uno, Antena 3 (2012). Judge.
- Mira quien va a Eurovisión, TVE (2014). Judge.
- Tu cara me suena, Antena 3 (2014–2017). Judge.
- Operación Triunfo 2017, TVE (2017–2018). Judge.
- Mónica y el Sexo, Cuatro (2019). Host.
- La isla de las tentaciones, Cuatro (2019). Host.
- Love Never Lies, Netflix (2021–present). Host.
- Benidorm Fest 2023, TVE (2023). Host.

=== Other releases ===
- Amor y lujo, with Studio Kawaii (Manga) (2008)
- Todo mentira, With Studio Kawaii (Manga) (2010)
- Come y calla (Recipe book) (2013)
