= Luis Miguel albums discography =

- Studio albums: 21
- Extended plays: 3
- Soundtrack albums: 2
- Live albums: 2
- Compilation albums: 30
- Box sets: 5
- Reissues: 4
- Remix albums: 1

Mexican recording artist Luis Miguel has released 21 studio albums, 30 compilation albums, three extended plays (EP) two live albums, two soundtrack albums and five box set. Luis Miguel has sold over 60 million records, making him one of the best-selling Latin music artists of all time. Luis Miguel is also the artist with the second-most number ones on the Billboard Top Latin Albums chart with nine albums. At the age of 11, he released his debut studio album, Un Sol (1982), which was certified platinum and gold in Mexico. The artist would release four more studio albums under the record label EMI: Directo al Corazón (1982), Decídete (1983), También es Rock (1984), and Palabra de Honor (1984). A Portuguese-language version of Decídete and Palabra de Honor were released in Brazil as Decide Amor and Meu Sonho Perdido, respectively. Luis Miguel made his acting debut in the film as the lead role on Ya nunca más (1984) and recorded its soundtrack. In 1985, he participated in the Sanremo Music Festival 1985 with the song "Noi ragazzi di oggi"; it placed second in the Big Artist category and was later included on the Italian-language edition of Palabra de Honor. In the same year, Luis Miguel recorded the soundtrack for the film Fiebre de amor, which he co-starred with fellow Mexican singer Lucero.

In 1986, Luis Miguel left EMI and signed with Warner Music following a fallout from his father, Luisito Rey, and his mother's disappearance. His first record under Warner Music was Soy Como Quiero Ser (1987), which was produced by Spanish musician Juan Carlos Calderón. Calderón had previously composed several of the tracks on Palabra de Honor The album was promoted by its lead single, "Ahora Te Puedes Marchar" and became the artist's first chart topper on the Billboard Hot Latin Songs chart. Soy Como Quiero Ser was followed by Busca una Mujer (1988) and 20 Años (1990), which were also produced by Calderón. The albums reached peaked at number four and two on the Billboard Latin Pop Albums chart, respectively. The songs on his early recordings were characterized as soft rock and pop ballad tunes, which led to Miguel becoming a teen idol. With his first three albums under Warner Music label he sold over three million copies only in Mexico.

In 1991, Luis Miguel released Romance, a collection of bolero covers and co-produced with Armando Manzanero. With sales of over eight million copies, it is his best-selling record and was credited with reviving mainstream interest in the bolero genre. Luis Miguel would record three more bolero albums: Segundo Romance (1994), Romances (1997), and Mis Romances (2001). The first three bolero albums were certified platinum in the United States by the Recording Industry Association of America (RIAA), making him the first Latino artist to have two Spanish-language records with this achievement. Segundo Romance and Romances are also among the best-selling Latin albums in the US. The artist concluded the bolero recordings with the release of the compilation album Mis Boleros Favoritos (2002), following poor sales of Mis Romances. With only his bolero albums he sold 23 million copies worldwide.

In between the Romance-themed studio records, Luis Miguel released three pop studio albums: Aries (1993), Nada Es Igual... (1996), and Amarte Es un Placer (1999). Aries received a diamond certification in Argentina by the Argentine Chamber of Phonograms and Videograms Producers (CAPIF) while Nada Es Igual... and Amarte Es un Placer were certified gold in the US by the RIAA. In 2003, Luis Miguel released another pop record, 33, which topped the Top Latin Albums chart in the US, but was otherwise not commercially well received. It was followed by México en la Piel (2004), his first album of mariachi standards and it received a diamond certification in Mexico. Afterwards, Luis Miguel released his first greatest hits album under Warner Music, Grandes Éxitos (2005) which consists of all previously recorded material since he began working with the label in 1987 as well as two original tracks ("Misterios del Amor" and "Si Te Perdiera"); it reached number one on the Mexican Albums Chart. In 2006, he released Navidades, a Spanish-language Christmas album. Two years later, he collaborated with Spanish songwriter Manuel Alejandro to compose and produce his 19th studio record, Cómplices. It was then succeeded by his self-titled album in 2010. All three recordsreached number one on the Billboard Top Latin Albums chart. After seven years, which was marked with legal and health issues, he released his second album of mariachi covers, ¡México Por Siempre! (2017).

== Studio albums ==
List of studio albums, with selected chart positions, certifications and sales figures
Title	Album details	Peak chart positions							Certifications	Sales
Title	Album details	MEX (Note: In Mexico, both Hung Medien and AMPROFON websites are used to retrieve chart positions.)	ARG (Note: In Argentina, in the 1980s, chart positions shown were published in Cashbox's "International Bestsellers", while from 1991 to 1998, chart positions shown were published in Billboard's "Hits of the World" section. From 2000 onwards, chart information shown is provided by CAPIF.)	CHI (Note: Chilean chart information was published in Billboard's "Hits of the World" section, which was provided by the courtesy of the Asociacion Fonográfica de Chile (IFPI Chile).)	SPA (Note: In Spain, chart positions shown were published on the book Sólo éxitos. Año a año. 1959–2002 (2005) by Fernando Salaverri and on Billboard's "Hits of the World" section. From 2005 onwards, chart information shown is provided by PROMUSICAE.)	US	US Latin	US Latin Pop	Certifications	Sales
Un Sol	Released: 21 January 1982; Label: EMI; Formats: Cassette, LP, CD	—	4	—	—	—	—	—	AMPROFON: Platinum+Gold	WW: 1,500,000; MEX: 1,000,000; ARG: 10,000
Directo al Corazón	Released: 1982; Label: EMI; Formats: Cassette, LP, CD, Digital	—	1	—	—	—	—	—	AMPROFON: 2× Platinum; CAPIF: Platinum	MEX: 900,000; ARG: 115,000
Decídete (Note: Released in Brazil as Decide Amor.)	Released: 1983; Label: EMI; Formats: Cassette, LP, CD, Digital	—	3	—	14	—	—	—	AMPROFON: 2× Platinum	MEX: 400,000; ARG: 50,000
También es Rock	Released: 1984; Label: EMI Music; Formats: LP, CD	—	—	—	—	—	—	—		
Palabra de Honor (Note: Released in Brazil and Italy as Meu Sonho Perdido and Noi, Ragazzi Di Oggi, respectively.)	Released: 9 November 1984; Label: EMI; Formats: Cassette, LP, CD, Digital	—	4	—	—	—	—	—	CAPIF: Platinum; AMPROFON: Gold	MEX: 500,000; ARG: 75,000
Soy Como Quiero Ser (Note: The Brazilian edition includes 3 versions in portuguese.)	Released: 15 July 1987; Label: Warner Music; Formats: Cassette, LP, CD, Digital	—	—	—	—	—	—	12	AMPROFON: 5× Platinum; CAPIF: 3× Platinum; PROMUSICAE: Gold; IFPI CHI: Gold	WW: 2,000,000; MEX: 1,000,000
Busca una Mujer (Note: The Brazilian edition includes 2 versions in portuguese.)	Released: 25 November 1988; Label: Warner Music; Formats: Cassette, LP, CD, Digital	21	7	—	85	—	—	4	AMPROFON: 10× Gold; CAPIF: 4× Platinum; PROMUSICAE: Platinum; IFPI CHI: Gold	WW: 3,000,000; MEX: 1,400,000; CHI: 120,000; US: 85,000
20 Años	Released: 18 May 1990; Label: Warner Music; Formats: Cassette, LP, CD, Cassette, Digital	—	8	—	92	—	46	2	AMPROFON: 2× Platinum+5× Gold; CAPIF: 5× Platinum; PROMUSICAE: 3× Platinum	WW: 2,000,000; MEX: 1,000,000; US: 200,000; CHI: 117,000
Romance	Released: 19 November 1991; Label: Warner Music; Formats: CD, LP, Cassette, Digital	—	1	5	7	—	3	1	AMPROFON: 8× Platinum; CAPIF: Diamond; RIAA: Platinum; PROMUSICAE: 2× Platinum; IFPI CHI: Diamond	WW: 8,000,000; MEX: 3,000,000; ARG: 1,354,795; CHI: 500,000
Aries	Released: 22 June 1993; Label: Warner Music; Formats: CD, LP, Cassette, Digital	—	2	1	91	182	2	1	AMPROFON: 4× Platinum; CAPIF: Diamond; PROMUSICAE: Platinum	WW: 3,000,000; MEX: 1,000,000; ARG: 693,162; CHI: 200,000
Segundo Romance	Released: 30 August 1994; Label: Warner Music; Formats: CD, Cassette, LP, Digital	—	1	1	33	29	1	1	CAPIF:Diamond; PROMUSICAE: 2× Platinum; RIAA: Platinum; IFPI CHI: Diamond	WW: 4,500,000; MEX: 2,000,000; ARG: 813,082; US: 603,000; CHI: 325,000
Nada Es Igual...	Released: 20 August 1996; Label: Warner Music; Formats: CD, Cassette, Digital	—	1	—	2	43	1	1	CAPIF: 7× Platinum; PROMUSICAE: 2× Platinum; RIAA: Gold; IFPI CHI: 5× Platinum	WW: 3,000,000; MEX: 600,000; ARG: 500,000; CHI: 150,000
Romances	Released: 12 August 1997; Label: Warner Music; Formats: CD, DVD-Audio, LP, Cassette, Digital	—	1	—	1	14	1	1	AMPROFON: 4× Platinum+2× Gold; CAPIF: Diamond; PROMUSICAE: 9× Platinum; RIAA: Platinum; IFPI CHI: 8× Platinum	WW: 4,500,000; MEX: 1,675,000; SPA: 1,000,000; ARG: 781,000; US: 687,000; CHI: 433,000
Amarte Es un Placer	Released: 13 September 1999; Label: Warner Music; Formats: CD, Cassette, Digital	—	6	—	1	36	1	1	AMPROFON: 5× Platinum; CAPIF: 5× Platinum; PROMUSICAE: 7× Platinum; RIAA: Gold; IFPI CHI: 4× Platinum	WW: 3,500,000; MEX: 800,000; SPA: 650,000; ARG: 281,000; CHI: 100,000
Mis Romances	Released: 13 November 2001; Label: Warner Music; Formats: CD, Cassette, Digital	—	1	—	2	115	2	1	AMPROFON: 4× Platinum; CAPIF: 4× Platinum; PROMUSICAE: 3× Platinum; RIAA: 4× Platinum (Latin); IFPI CHI: Gold	WW: 2,500,000; MEX: 700,000; SPA: 400,000
33	Released: 30 September 2003; Label: Warner Music; Formats: CD, Digital	—	1	—	1	43	1	1	AMPROFON: 5× Platinum; CAPIF: 2× Platinum; PROMUSICAE: 2× Platinum; RIAA: 2× Platinum (Latin); IFPI CHI: 2× Platinum	WW: 2,000,000; SPA: 200,000; CHI: 50,000
México en la Piel	Released: 9 November 2004; Label: Warner Music; Formats: CD, LP, Digital	1	1	—	1	37	1	—	AMPROFON:Diamond+3×Platinum; CAPIF: 2× Platinum; PROMUSICAE: Platinum; RIAA: 4× Platinum (Latin); IFPI CHI: Platinum	WW: 2,000,000; MEX: 800,000; US: 310,000
Navidades (Note: Released in Brazil as Feliz Natal.)	Released: 14 November 2006; Label: Warner Music; Formats: CD, Digital	1	2	—	4	51	1	1	AMPROFON: Diamond; RIAA: 2× Platinum (Latin); PROMUSICAE: Gold; CAPIF: Platinum; IFPI CHI: Gold	WW: 1,100,000; MEX: 700,000; US: 145,000
Cómplices	Released: 2 May 2008; Label: Warner Music; Formats: CD, Digital	1	1	1	1	10	1	1	AMPROFON: Diamond; CAPIF: 3× Platinum; PROMUSICAE: Platinum; RIAA: Platinum (Latin); IFPI CHI: 2× Platinum	WW: 1,200,000; MEX: 400,000; ARG: 120,000; US: 72,000; SPA: 65,000; CHI: 25,000
Luis Miguel	Released: 14 September 2010; Label: Warner Music; Formats: CD, Digital	1	1	—	1	45	1	1	AMPROFON: 4× Platinum; CAPIF: Platinum; IFPI CHI: Gold	MEX: 400,000
¡México Por Siempre!	Released: 24 November 2017; Label: Warner Music; Formats: CD, Digital	1	2	—	6	184	2	—	AMPROFON: 3× Platinum; RIAA: Gold (Latin)	
"—" denotes a recording that did not chart or was not released in that territory.

== Reissues ==
List of reissues, with selected chart positions
Title	Album details	Peak chart positions
Title	Album details	ARG
México en la Piel: Edicion Diamante	Released: 6 September 2005; Label: Warner Music; Format: CD	—
Cómplices: Edición Especial	Released: 28 April 2009; Label: Warner Music; Format: CD	—
Luis Miguel: Edicion de Lujo	Released: 18 January 2011; Label: Warner Music; Format: CD	14
Romance: Edición 20 Aniversario	Released: 28 February 2012; Label: Warner Music; Format: LP, CD & 45"	—
"—" denotes a recording that did not chart or was not released in that territory.

== Live albums ==
List of live albums, with selected chart positions, certifications and sales figures
Title	Album details	Peak chart positions							Certifications	Sales
Title	Album details	MEX	ARG	CHI	SPA	US	US Latin	US Latin Pop	Certifications	Sales
El Concierto	Released: 17 October 1995; Label: Warner Music; Formats: CD, LP, Cassette, Digital	—	1	1	17	45	2	2	AMPROFON: 2× Platinum; CAPIF: 4× Platinum; PROMUSICAE: Gold; RIAA: Gold; IFPI CHI: Diamond	WW: 2,000,000; MEX: 500,000; CHI: 250,000
Vivo	Released: 3 October 2000; Label: Warner Music; Formats: CD, Cassette, Digital	13	1	—	2	93	2	2	AMPROFON: 3× Platinum+Gold; CAPIF: 2× Platinum; PROMUSICAE: 3× Platinum; RIAA: 2× Platinum (Latin); IFPI CHI: Platinum	WW: 2,000,000
"—" denotes a recording that did not chart or was not released in that territory.

== Soundtrack albums ==
List of soundtrack albums, with selected chart positions, certifications and sales figures
Title	Album details	Peak chart positions		Certifications	Sales
Title	Album details	MEX	ARG	Certifications	Sales
Ya Nunca Más	Released: 1984; Label: EMI Music; Formats: LP, Cassette, Digital	—	—	AMPROFON: Gold	
Fiebre de amor	Released: 1985; Label: EMI Music; Formats: LP, Cassette, CD, Digital	—	4		MEX: 400,000
"—" denotes a recording that did not chart or was not released in that territory.

== Compilation albums ==
List of compilation albums, with selected chart positions, certifications and sales figures
Title	Album details	Peak chart positions							Certifications	Sales
Title	Album details	MEX	ARG	CHI	SPA	US	US Latin	US Latin Pop	Certifications	Sales
Canta En Italiano	Released: 1985; Label: EMI Music; Formats: LP, Cassette, CD	—	—	—	—	—	—	—		
14 Grandes Éxitos	Released: 1986; Label: EMI Music; Formats: LP, CD, Cassette	—	—	—	—	—	—	—		
Decídete / Directo al Corazón	Released: 1989; Label: EMI Music; Formats: LP, Cassette, CD	—	—	—	—	—	—	—		
Para Ti	Released: 1989; Label: EMI Music; Formats: LP, CD	—	—	—	—	—	—	—		
El Idolo De Mexico	Released: 1992; Label: EMI Music; Formats: CD	—	—	—	—	—	—	—		
Collezione Privata	Released: February 9, 1993; Label: EMI Music; Formats: CD, LP	—	—	—	—	—	—	—		
Los Idolos De Mexico	Released: February 23, 1993; Label: EMI Music; Formats: CD	—	—	—	—	—	—	—		
Sentimental (Note: 18 track compilation from his pop albums, released in Asia only. The Southeast Asia version includes one bonus track ("La Incondicional").)	Released: 1994; Label: Warner Music; Formats: CD	—	—	—	—	—	—	—		
Romantico Desde Siempre	Released: November 29, 1994; Label: EMI Music; Formats: CD	—	—	—	—	—	26	11		
Lo Mejor de los Mejores, Vol. 1	Released: 1994; Label: EMI Music; Formats: CD	—	—	—	—	—	—	—		
Romantico Desde Siempre, Vol. 2	Released: 1997; Label: EMI Music; Formats: CD	—	—	—	—	—	—	—		
Leyend	Released: 1998; Label: EMI Music; Formats: CD	—	—	—	—	—	—	—		
21 Black Jack	Released: 2000; Label: EMI Music; Formats: CD	—	—	—	—	—	—	—		
Antología	Released: 2002; Label: EMI Music; Formats: CD	—	—	—	—	—	—	—		
Solo lo Mejor: 20 Exitos	Released: January 29, 2002; Label: EMI Music; Formats: CD	—	—	—	—	—	—	—		
Amándote a la Italiana	Released: April 9, 2002; Label: EMI Music; Formats: CD	—	—	—	—	—	—	—		
Latin Classics	Released: October 1, 2002; Label: EMI Music; Formats: CD	—	—	—	—	—	—	—		
Mis Boleros Favoritos	Released: 8 October 2002; Label: Warner Music; Formats: CD	—	7	—	1	125	3	3	PROMUSICAE: 2× Platinum; RIAA: 2× Platinum (Latin); CAPIF: Platinum	WW: 1,000,000
Serie de Oro: Grandes Exitos	Released: March 4, 2003; Label: EMI Music; Formats: CD	—	—	—	—	—	—	—		
30 Exitos Insuperables	Released: May 6, 2003; Label: EMI Music; Formats: CD	—	—	—	—	—	—	—		
Sus Primeros Exitos	Released: April 27, 2004; Label: EMI Music; Formats: CD	—	—	—	—	—	—	—		
Desde un Principio: Directo Al Corazón	Released: April 5, 2005; Label: EMI Music; Formats: CD	—	—	—	—	—	—	—		
Grandes Éxitos	Released: 22 November 2005; Label: Warner Music; Formats: CD	1	1	—	5	—	8	6	AMPROFON: 4× Platinum; CAPIF: Platinum; PROMUSICAE: Platinum; RIAA: 2× Platinum (Latin)	WW: 600,000; MEX: 395,000
Perfil	Released: 2005; Label: Som Livre; Formats: CD	—	—	—	—	—	—	—		
Serie Verde	Released: September 25, 2007; Label: EMI Music; Formats: CD	—	—	—	—	—	—	—		
Lo Mejor de Los Mejores, Vol. 2	Released: January 1, 2008; Label: EMI Music; Formats: CD	—	—	—	—	—	—	—		
Celebridades	Released: March 11, 2008; Label: EMI Music; Formats: CD	—	—	—	—	—	—	—		
Collector's Edition	Released: March 18, 2008; Label: Madacy Latino; Formats: CD	—	—	—	—	—	—	—		
40 Éxitos	Released: 2008; Label: EMI Music; Formats: CD	—	—	—	—	—	—	—		
La Miel de Mis Primeros Éxitos	Released: September 4, 2010; Label: EMI Music; Formats: Digital	—	—	—	—	—	—	—		
"—" denotes a recording that did not chart or was not released in that territory.

== Remix albums ==
List of remix albums, with selected chart positions and certifications
Title	Album details	Peak chart positions						Certifications
Title	Album details	MEX	ARG	SPA	US	US Latin	US Latin Pop	Certifications
No Culpes a La Noche	Released: 22 September 2009; Label: Warner Music; Formats: CD	3	—	11	180	4	2	AMPROFON: Platinum+Gold; CAPIF: Gold
"—" denotes a recording that did not chart or was not released in that territory.

== Extended plays ==
List of extended plays, with selected chart positions and certifications
Title	Album details	Peak chart positions						Certifications
Title	Album details	MEX	ARG	SPA	US	US Latin	US Latin Pop	Certifications
Ritmo Disco	Released: 1984; Label: EMI Music; Formats: LP	—	—	—	—	—	—	
América & En Vivo	Released: 25 September 1992; Label: Warner Music; Formats: CD, LP, Cassette	—	—	—	—	30	12	CAPIF: Platinum
Canciones de Amor	Released: 2007; Label: Warner Music; Formats: Digital	—	—	—	—	—	—	
"—" denotes a recording that did not chart or was not released in that territory.

== Box sets ==
List of box sets, with selected chart positions and certifications
Title	Album details	Peak chart positions						Certifications
Title	Album details	MEX	ARG	SPA	US	US Latin	US Latin Pop	Certifications
Romance (Doble Disco) (Note: Includes 2 CD's: Romance and Segundo Romance)	Released: 1994; Label: Warner Music; Formats: CD	—	—	7	—	—	—	PROMUSICAE: 2× Platinum
Pop Box Set (Note: Includes 4 CD's: Busca Una Mujer, 20 Años, Aries and Nada Es Igual)	Released: 1997; Label: Warner Music; Formats: CD	—	—	—	—	—	—	
Todos Los Romances	Released: 11 August 1998; Label: Warner Music; Formats: CD, Cassette	—	—	4	—	12	6	CAPIF: Gold; PROMUSICAE: 2× Platinum
Cómplices: Edición Especial Navidad (Note: Includes 2 CD's: Navidades and Cómplices)	Released: 2 December 2008; Label: Warner Music; Formats: CD	—	—	—	—	—	—	
The Complete EMI Collection	Released: 2008; Label: EMI Music; Formats: CD	—	—	—	—	—	—	
"—" denotes a recording that did not chart or was not released in that territory.

== See also ==
- Lists of fastest-selling albums
- List of best-selling Latin albums
- List of best-selling Latin albums in the United States
- List of best-selling albums in Argentina
- List of best-selling albums in Brazil
- List of best-selling albums in Chile
- List of best-selling albums in Mexico
- List of best-selling albums in Spain
- List of best-selling Latin music artists
- Luis Miguel singles discography
