= Éxitos y Recuerdos =

Éxitos y Recuredos (English: Hits and Memories) is a compilation album series that was first released in 1995 under the title Exitos del Recuerdo which spotlighted Selena. In 1996, the series changed the name to Exitos y Recuerdos spotlighting other artists of different Mexican music genres, mostly of Tejano music singers. The album was produced by EMI-Capitol Special Markets in the United States whereas Madacy Entertainment was produced in Canada.

== Éxitos del Recuerdo ==
- Éxitos del Recuerdo, compilation album by Álvaro Torres (1995)
- Éxitos del Recuerdo, compilation album by Daniela Romo (1995)
- Éxitos del Recuerdo, compilation album by Dyango (1995)
- Éxitos del Recuerdo, compilation album by Ednita Nazario (1995)
- Éxitos del Recuerdo, compilation album by Mijares (1995)
- Éxitos del Recuerdo, compilation album by Selena (1995)
- Éxitos del Recuerdo de la Radio, compilation album by various of artists (2003)
- Éxitos y Recuerdos, compilation album by Freddy Fender (2006)
- Éxitos y Recuerdos, compilation album by José Feliciano (1997)
- Éxitos y Recuerdos, compilation album by Selena (1996, 1997, 2006)
- Éxitos y Recuerdos, compilation album by Yuri (1996)
- Pandora: Éxitos y Recuerdos, compilation album by Pandora (1997)

== Éxitos & Recuerdos ==
- Éxitos & Recuerdos, compilation album by Los Ángeles Negros (1996)
- Éxitos & Recuerdos, compilation album by Daniela Romo (1996)
- Éxitos & Recuerdos, compilation album by Eddie Santiago (1996)
- Éxitos & Recuerdos, compilation album by Mazz (1996, 1997)
- Éxitos & Recuerdos, compilation album by Mijares (1996)
- Éxitos & Recuerdos, compilation album by Myriam Hernández (1996)
- Éxitos & Recuerdos, compilation album by Paloma San Basilio (1996)

== See also ==
- Fotos y Recuerdos
