= Bad Girls (Mónica Naranjo album) =

Studio album by Mónica Naranjo
- Released: January 1, 2002
- Genres: Latin pop; dance; house
- Labels: Epic; Sony
- Producers: Gregg Alexander; Louis Biancaniello; Rich E. Blaze; Giulia Fasolino; Alfredo Golino; Khris Kellow; Paul Meehan; Gary Miller; Brian Rawling; Cristóbal Sansano; Graham Stack; Diane Warren; Sam Watters; Bruno Zuchetti

Mónica Naranjo chronology
| Grandes Éxitos (2002) | Bad Girls (2002) | Colección Privada (2005) |

Singles from Bad Girls
- 1. "I Ain't Gonna Cry" Released: 2002

Bad Girls is the third studio album and first English-language album by Spanish singer Mónica Naranjo. It was recorded in 2001 as the English counterpart to Chicas Malas. Following the commercial success of her first three albums, Chicas Malas underperformed in Spain and Mexico, leading Sony Music to lose interest in fully supporting the international release of Bad Girls.

The project was conceived after Minage, an album that marked a stylistic departure from Naranjo’s earlier pop-oriented work. She agreed to record an English-language album on the condition that a Spanish version would also be produced. Although she had planned to take a hiatus after nearly ten consecutive years of work, she accepted the project primarily out of professional commitment. The album had an estimated production cost of approximately €500,000 and was recorded in multiple countries.

According to Naranjo, Bad Girls was recorded under significant pressure from Sony Music, with limited creative control. She later stated that she disagreed with most of the songs, had little involvement in the lyrics, and that her artistic proposals were frequently rejected for being “not commercial enough”. The album was recorded in a short time frame and overseen by Sony executive Tommy Mottola.

During the recording period, Naranjo’s brother became seriously ill and later died, an event that deeply affected her experience with the project. During promotion, she shaved her head, a gesture widely interpreted as an act of rebellion against the record label. The personal circumstances surrounding the album, combined with its commercial context, contributed to her long-standing rejection of the project. After its release, she distanced herself from pop and disco music, ended her contract with Sony Music, and entered a hiatus that lasted until 2008.

Sony Music attempted limited releases of Bad Girls in Spain, Mexico, and selected European countries, mainly through promotional copies, radio airplay, and online distribution. Four singles were released from the album. Bad Girls sold approximately 100,000 copies worldwide, while the single “I Ain’t Gonna Cry” achieved notable success in Spain.

The album is widely regarded as a turning point in Mónica Naranjo’s career, marking the end of her early pop image and the beginning of a more experimental artistic phase.

== Promotion ==
During the Chicas Malas / Bad Girls era, Mónica Naranjo undertook an extensive promotional campaign between 2001 and 2004, marked by numerous television appearances, interviews, live performances, promotional events, and a significant number of cancellations. The era officially began on 26 October 2001 with the radio premiere of the lead single “Chicas Malas”, followed by the album’s release on 12 November 2001. In the weeks that followed, Naranjo appeared on numerous Spanish television programs, participated in award ceremonies, held press conferences, and carried out several record-signing events, while also recording the music video for “Chicas Malas” and promoting additional tracks from the album.

Throughout late 2001 and early 2002, promotional activities intensified with further television appearances, radio interviews, remix releases, and live performances. During this period, the singles “No Voy a Llorar” and “Sacrificio” were promoted, although some planned releases and appearances were later cancelled. In February 2002, Chicas Malas was released in Mexico, followed by an extensive promotional tour that included television programs, radio interviews, press conferences, record signings, and live performances. However, between March and April 2002, a large portion of the scheduled promotional agenda was cancelled, resulting in a noticeable slowdown of the campaign.

Later in 2002, attention gradually shifted toward the English-language project Bad Girls. Although several singles and releases were announced, including “I Ain’t Gonna Cry”, many of these plans were ultimately cancelled before their official release dates. Despite this, Naranjo performed English-language material at selected events and continued to appear sporadically on television.

In 2003 and 2004, limited promotional activities resumed. The music video for “I Ain’t Gonna Cry” premiered through Sony Music’s website, and promotional copies of Bad Girls were distributed. The single was released commercially in Greece, followed by additional televised performances and special appearances. The music video for “I Don’t Wanna Take This” premiered on her official website in July 2003, and further performances took place at various events throughout the year. The album Bad Girls was eventually released in Greece in September 2003 and in Turkey in October 2003, concluding with isolated public appearances later that year and radio promotion in early 2004.

== Track listing ==
Bad Girls — Standard Edition
| No. | Title | Writer(s) | Spanish version | Length |
|---|---|---|---|---|
| 1. | "I Ain't Gonna Cry (Steelworks Mix Radio Edit)" | Mónica Naranjo, John Reid, Cliff Masterson | | 3:59 |
| 2. | "Ain't Better Like This" (Edit version) | Gregg Alexander | | 3:52 |
| 3. | "I Don't Wanna Take This" | Naranjo, Giulia Fasolino, Bruno Zucchetti, Anna Gotti | "No Puedo Seguir" | 4:28 |
| 4. | "What About Love" | Louis Biancaniello, Sam Watters | "Sacrificio" | 4:20 |
| 5. | "Bad Girls" | Naranjo, Fasolino, Zuchetti, Gotti | "Chicas Malas" | 3:55 |
| 6. | "If You Leave Me Now (Rawling Mix)" | Naranjo, Reid, Graham Stack | | 3:25 |
| 7. | "I Live For You" | Chris Eaton, Chris Rodriguez | "Yo Vivo en Ti" | 4:22 |
| 8. | "Love Found Me" | Diane Warren | "No Cambies Nunca" | 4:40 |
| 9. | "Enamorada (Sub-Urban Mix)" | Richard Darbyshire, Matteo Saggese, Frank Musker, Walter Turbitt | | 4:16 |
| 10. | "I'll Never Run" | Naranjo, Fasolino, Zuchetti | "Libérame" | 4:58 |
| 11. | "Hot Line" | Naranjo, Reid | "Hot Line" | 4:45 |
| 12. | "I Ain't Gonna Cry" | Naranjo, Masterson, Reid | "No Voy a Llorar" | 4:24 |
| 13. | "Bad Girls (Ny Remix)" | Naranjo, Fasolino, Zuchetti, Gotti | | 3:47 |

Bad Girls — Bonus CD (Remixes and Special DJ Session)
| No. | Title | Writer(s) | Length |
|---|---|---|---|
| 14. | "What About Love (Corky Mix)" | Biancaniello, Watters | 3:26 |
| 15. | "If You Leave Me Now (Tombah Energy Single Mix)" | Naranjo, Reid, Stack | 3:42 |
| 16. | "Enamorada (Gypsy English Version Remix)" | Darbyshire, Saggese, Musker, Turbitt | 4:11 |
| 17. | "Ain't It Better Like This (Rapino Carrera Club Mix)" | Alexander | 4:51 |
| 18. | "Chicas Malas (Ferrero/Del Moral Single Remix)" | Naranjo, Fasolino, Zuchetti, Gotti | 4:10 |
| 19. | "I Ain't Gonna Cry (LA Fabrique du Son Weekend Edit Remix Edit)" | Naranjo, Reid, Masterson | 4:30 |
| 20. | "I Don't Wanna Take This (Ferrero & Del Moral English Batucada Remix)" | Naranjo, Fasolino, Zuchetti, Gotti | 4:20 |
| 21. | "Weekend Dj Session by Ferrero/Del Moral & Mónica Naranjo" | Naranjo, Alexander, Fasolino, Zuchetti, Gotti, Reid, Masterson | 34:15 |

== Personnel ==
Credits adapted from AllMusic.

- Tracie Ackerman – Background vocals
- Gregg Alexander – Producer, Vocal Programming
- Robert Band – Assistant, Assistant Engineer
- Luis Barbería – Background vocals
- Gary Barlow – Musician, Programming
- Manny Benito – Adaptation
- Louis Biancaniello – Composer, Engineer, Keyboards, Mixing, Producer, Programming
- Marc Blanes – Digital Editing, Engineer
- Rich E. Blaze – Producer, Programming
- Jamie Bridges – Assistant
- Dario Caglioni – Digital Editing, Engineer
- Natalia Calderón – Background vocals
- Cesare Chiodo – Bass
- Ben Coombs – Assistant Engineer
- Ian Cooper – Mastering
- Emanuela Cortese – Background vocals
- Sheilah Cuffy – Background vocals
- Stefano de Maco – Background vocals
- Fausto Demetrio – Assistant Engineer
- Giulia Fasolino – Producer, Background vocals
- Gina Foster – Background vocals
- Maurizio Frabrizio – Classical guitar, Orchestra Director
- Steven Garcia – Assistant Engineer
- Alfredo Golino – Drums, Producer
- Juan Gonzalez – Digital Editing, Engineer
- Ramon Gonzalez – Congas
- Mary Griffin – Background vocals
- Isobel Griffiths – Orchestra Contractor
- Khris Kellow – Producer, Programming
- Eliot Kennedy – Musician, Programming
- Tim Lever – Musician
- Wally Lopez – Remixing
- James Loughrey – Engineer, Mixing
- Mario Lucy – Engineer, Mixing
- Roberto Maccagno – Digital Editing, Engineer
- Manuel Machado – Trumpet, Vocals (Background)
- Avril Mackintosh – Digital Editing, Engineer, Vocal Engineer
- David Massey – A&R
- Paul Meehan – Producer
- Segundo Mijares – Saxophone
- Gary Miller – Guitar, Keyboards, Mixing, Producer, Programming, Remixing
- Jordi Mora – Assistant Engineer
- Pablo del Moral – Remixing
- Mónica Naranjo – Director, Primary Artist, Vocals (Background)
- Ali Olmo – Background vocals
- Mike Percy – Musician
- Brian Rawling – Producer
- John Reid – Background vocals
- Chris Rodriguez – Spanish Guitar
- Annie Roseberry – A&R
- Cristóbal Sansano – Director, Executive Producer
- Graham Stack – Producer
- Joan Trayter – Mixing
- Diane Warren – Executive Producer
- Sam Watters – Engineer, Mixing, Producer, Background vocals
- Tim Woodcock – Musician, Programming
- Gavyn Wright – Orchestra Leader
- Bruno Zuchetti – Arranger, Keyboards, Producer, Programming

== Release history ==
| Country / Platform | Date | Format | Label |
|---|---|---|---|
| Worldwide | 1 January 2002 | Digital release | Sony Music |
| Worldwide | 1 August 2002 | Digital release | Sony Music |
| Worldwide | 11 November 2002 | CD | Sony Music |
| Worldwide | 10 February 2003 | CD | Sony Music |
| Worldwide | 24 February 2003 | Digital release | Sony Music |
| Worldwide | 9 May 2006 | Digital release | Sony Music |
| Worldwide | 23 May 2006 | CD | Sony Music |
| Worldwide | 22 October 2006 | CD | Sony Music |
| Worldwide | 2 October 2019 | CD | Sony Music |
| Worldwide | 17 January 2020 | Digital release | Sony Music |
