= Tarántula =

Studio album by Mónica Naranjo
- Released: 22 April 2008
- Recorded: 2004–2008
- Genres: Electro-Rock; Gothic Rock; Classical Music
- Length: 53:22
- Labels: Ariola; BMG
- Producer: Cristóbal Sansano

Mónica Naranjo chronology
Colección Privada (2005)	Tarántula (2008)	La Más Perfecta Colección (2011)

Singles from Tarántula
- 1. "Europa" Released: 18 March 2008; 2. "Amor y Lujo" Released: 23 June 2008

Tarantula is the sixth studio-album by Spanish popstar Mónica Naranjo. It was released on 22 April 2008 in Spain after the release of the lead single "Europa", which reached number 1 on the Spanish Singles Chart for 6 consecutive weeks.

This album was Naranjo's first album in seven years, other than a greatest hits collection from her eleven years in the music industry, that her label, Sony-BMG, released in 2005.

It is also her only album with Ariola and its parent company, BMG, as Sony would later acquire all their labels, leading to the end of their merger and the relaunch of BMG in October 2008.

The album was produced by Union of Knives' Chris Gordon and Dave McClean, and it was recorded between London, Glasgow, New York City and Barcelona, between 2005 until 2008.

The album was released two days later in Latin America. The album was released in the United States on 24 November 2008.

== History ==
Tarantula is the product of 5 years of hard work. Mónica says the title of the album is because the body of work was born out of the poison she felt for the recording industry, and that the album is a logical follow up to her 1999 album Minage (given that her record company after Minage wanted albums more along the lines of previous work Palabra De Mujer and pressured her to come up with 2001's very commercially oriented Chicas Malas). Tarantula has a similar lyrical complexity to Minage but goes further in experimenting with sounds of electronica, heavy guitar riffs, and the use of classical accents throughout the album as well as new vocal experiments (colours/tones of voice as Mónica called it once in reality show Operación Triunfo) and the use of foreign languages in certain songs. Mónica said Tarantula is based on freedom of expression, being able to portray what she sees every day in life. Naranjo said that Carlos López, Sony BMG president in Spain, was convinced by the album as soon as hearing the first single "Europa". Mónica revealed in an interview that he said to her "if everything in this álbum is as awesome as this, I have no need to hear it all'. He listened to the whole body of work only a few weeks prior to its release, and Naranjo reported that he was fascinated with the outcome of the album. Mónica said that after years of silence she is tired of being afraid, and that she is very greateful to López for being the only person who has truly helped her in the industry. Mónica affirms that her next album may very well take a decade to complete if need be. She does not believe in rushing records just to sell them as her integrity as an artist is much more important to her; she stated that albums should be carefully crafted and that they should be given love and time to know what the direction of the album should be. Mónica feels that the 5 years invested were extremely worth the time and that she is truly satisfied with the fine work that Tarantula has become. She admits to being very aware that the album has a dark tone, but also a magical touch at the same time that captures you by transcending you on a journey to another world. In this album reality was said to be a key ingredient and not just empty words often used like "I love you, I love you." 40 Songs were composed and recorded for Tarantula, 11 making the final cut. Once the songs were finished they were tied together with interludes, helping the listener be captured seamlessly in Tarantula's world, without a second of silence. Monica states that the album cover has the same intent as the album. She said "it's as if you enter a circus tent and you find a woman that you don't know whether she's half human or half animal."

== Editions ==
The album has been released in Spain in two formats: the first one is a limited Digipack special edition of 40,000 copies and the second format is the normal edition.

== Track listing ==
#	Title	Songwriters & samples	Producer(s)	Length
1	"Europa"	Mónica Naranjo, J.M. Navarro, Cristóbal Sansano, I. Torrent, J. Garrido	Cristóbal Sansano	7:11
2	"Todo Mentira"	Mónica Naranjo, J.M. Navarro, Chris Gordon, Cristóbal Sansano, I. Torrent	Cristóbal Sansano	3:47
3	"Usted"	Mónica Naranjo, J.M. Navarro, Cristóbal Sansano, I. Torrent, J. Garrido	Cristóbal Sansano	3:45
4	"Para Siempre"	Mónica Naranjo, J.M. Navarro, Cristóbal Sansano, I. Torrent, J. Garrido	Cristóbal Sansano	5:12
5	"Amor y Lujo"	Mónica Naranjo, J.M. Navarro, Cristóbal Sansano, I. Torrent, J. Garrido	Cristóbal Sansano	4:06
6	"Idilio"	Mónica Naranjo, J.M. Navarro, Cristóbal Sansano, I. Torrent, J. Garrido	Cristóbal Sansano	4:24
7	"Diles Que No"	Mónica Naranjo, J.M. Navarro, Cristóbal Sansano, I. Torrent, J. Garrido	Cristóbal Sansano	3:46
8	"Kambalaya"	Mónica Naranjo, J.M. Navarro, Cristóbal Sansano, I. Torrent, J. Garrido	Cristóbal Sansano	5:11
9	"Eva"	Mónica Naranjo, J.M. Navarro, Cristóbal Sansano, I. Torrent, J. Garrido	Cristóbal Sansano	4:30
10	"Amor y Posesión"	Mónica Naranjo, J.M. Navarro, Cristóbal Sansano, I. Torrent, J. Garrido	Cristóbal Sansano	4:02
11	"Revolución"	Manny Benito, I. Torrent, J. Garrido	Cristóbal Sansano	4:06
#	Bonus track	Edition	Producer(s)	Length
12	"El Descanso"	Digipack Limited Edition	Cristóbal Sansano	3:16
13	"Kambalaya [Remix Edit]"	iTunes Edition	Cristóbal Sansano	3:16

== Release history ==
Country	Date
Spain	22 April 2008
Brazil	25 April 2008
Chile	25 April 2008
Argentina	13 May 2008
Mexico	13 May 2008
United States	24 November 2008

== Charts and certifications ==
The album reached the Spanish top on 21 April 2008, with sales of 40,000 copies, being certified that same week as Gold. On 14 July 2008, Tarántula was certified Platinum in Spain.

Chart (2008)	Peak position
Mexican Albums (Top 100 Mexico)	30
Spanish Albums (Promusicae)	1
