= Chicas Malas =

Studio album by Mónica Naranjo
- Released: 26 October 2001
- Genres: Latin pop; dance; house; techno; disco
- Length: 48:13
- Labels: Epic; Sony
- Producers: Mónica Naranjo; Diane Warren; Paul Meehan; Louis Biancaniello; Kris Kello; Sam Watters; Cristóbal Sansano; Gregg Alexander

Mónica Naranjo chronology
Minage (2000)	Chicas Malas (2001)	Grandes Éxitos (2002)

Singles from Chicas Malas
- 1. "Chicas Malas" Released: 2001; 2. "Sacrificio" Released: 2002; 3. "No Voy a Llorar" Released: 2002; 4. "Ain't Better Like This" Released: 2002

Chicas Malas is the fourth studio album by Spanish singer Mónica Naranjo, released on October 26, 2001 by Epic Records, serving as a follow-up to her hugely-successful third studio album Minage. Unlike her previous releases, which achieved significant commercial success in Spain and Mexico, Chicas Malas underperformed commercially despite extensive promotion, resulting in disappointment for both Naranjo and her record label.

Musically, the album continued the pop and dance-oriented style associated with Naranjo’s earlier work. However, its reception was affected by its position in her discography, as it followed the more experimental and personal Minage, which had altered public and critical expectations regarding her artistic direction. During the recording process, Naranjo experienced a profound personal loss with the serious illness and subsequent death of her brother, an event that reportedly impacted her emotional connection to the project.

Sony Music promoted Chicas Malas primarily in Spain and Mexico and explored limited distribution in other markets, including Greece, France, Portugal, Germany, and Romania, mainly through promotional singles and radio airplay. Despite these efforts, the album did not receive a full international release and garnered mixed responses from critics and audiences.

The album achieved notable success in Spain, debuting at number four, and selling approximately 100,000 copies in its first week, eventually being certified Platinum; while all of its four singles ("Chicas Malas", "Sacrificio", "No Voy a Llorar" and "Ain't It Better Like This") reached the top-ten in Spain. Although its modest commercial performance, Chicas Malas includes several tracks noted for showcasing Naranjo’s vocal range and the early signs of her evolving artistic approach, and is retrospectively regarded as a transitional release, signaling the conclusion of her early pop-focused period and foreshadowing the more experimental direction of her later work.

== Track listing ==
No.	Title	Writer(s)	English version	Length
1.	"Chicas Malas"	Mónica Naranjo, Giulia Fasolino, Bruno Zucchetti, Anna Gotti	"Bad Girls"	3:54
2.	"No Voy a Llorar"	Naranjo, John Reid, Cliff Masterson	"I Ain't Gonna Cry"	4:01
3.	"De Qué Me Sirve Ya"	Naranjo, Cristóbal Sansano, Maria Eugenia Salaverri	"Let The Love Begin"	4:40
4.	"No Puedo Seguir"	Naranjo, Fasolino, Zuchetti, Gotti	"I Don't Wanna Take This"	4:28
5.	"Yo Vivo en Ti"	Chris Eaton, Chris Rodriguez	"I Live For You"	4:21
6.	"Libérame"	Naranjo, Fasolino, Zuchetti, Salaverri	"I'll Never Run"	4:57
7.	"Hot Line"	Naranjo, Reid, Sansano	"Hot Line"	4:45
8.	"Lágrimas de Escarcha"	Naranjo, Fasolino, Zuchetti, Salaverri	"If You Say You Love Me"	4:12
9.	"Sacrificio"	Louis Biancaniello, Sam Watters	"What About Love"	4:21
10.	"No Cambies Nunca"	Diane Warren	"Love Found Me"	4:41
11.	"Ain't It Better Like This"	Gregg Alexander		3:53

== Credits and personnel ==
Credits adapted from AllMusic.

- Mónica Naranjo – Coros, Digital Producer, Realization
- Chris Rodriguez – Spanish Guitar
- Gina Foster – Coros
- Diane Warren – Executive Producer
- Juan Gonzalez – Engineer
- Paul Meehan – Assistant Producer
- Gary Barlow – Programming, Instrumentation
- Silvio Pozzoli – Coros
- Manuel Machado – Coros, Trumpet
- Ian Cooper – Mastering
- James Loughrey – Engineer
- Mario Lucy – Engineer, Mastering
- Tracie Ackerman – Coros
- Carlos Martin – Graphic Design, Artwork Direction
- David Frazer – Mixing
- Juanjo Manez – Estilista
- Louis Biancaniello – Programming, Producer, Engineer, Keyboards, Mixing
- Tom Bender – Assistant Engineer
- David Massey – Artwork Direction
- Dennis Rivadeneira – Assistant Engineer
- Kris Kello – Programming, Producer
- Sam Watters – Producer, Coros, Engineer, Mixing
- Jamie Bridges – Assistant
- Fausto Demetrio – Assistant Engineer
- Annie Roseberry – Artwork Direction
- Ramon Gonzalez – Congas
- Cristóbal Sansano – Digital Producer, Executive Producer, Mixing
- Ben Coombs – Assistant Engineer
- Bruno Zuchetti – Programming, Keyboards, Mixing, arranger
- Eliot Kennedy – Programming, Instrumentation
- Maurizio Tonelli – Engineer
- Manny Benito – Adaptation
- Emanuela Cortese – Coros
- Cesare Chiodo – Bajo
- Stefano de Maco – Coros
- Sheilah Cuffy – Coros
- Giulia Fasolino – Coros, Realization, arranger
- Jaume DeLaiguana – Photography
- Alfredo Golino – Bateria, Realization, arranger
- Dario Caglioni – Digital Editing, engineer
- Gregg Alexander – Producer, Vocal Producer
- Segundo Mijares – Saxophone
- Ali Olmo – Coros
- Tim Woodcock – Programming, Instrumentation
- Aurora Beltran – Adaptation
- Maurizio Fabrizio – Guitar, Orchestra Director

== Charts ==
=== Weekly charts ===
2001 weekly chart performance for Chicas Malas
Chart (2001)	Peak position
Spanish Albums (Promusicae)	4

2021 weekly chart performance for Chicas Malas
Chart (2021)	Peak position
Spanish Albums (Promusicae)	10

== Certifications ==
Region	Certification	Certified units/sales
Spain (Promusicae)	Platinum	100,000^{^}
^{^} Shipments figures based on certification alone.

== Release history ==
Country	Date	Format	Label
Mexico	26 October 2001	CD / Digital download	Sony
United States	12 November 2001	CD / Digital download	Sony
Worldwide	26 February 2002	CD / Digital download	Sony
Worldwide	27 October 2006	CD / Digital download	Sony
Worldwide	28 February 2007	CD / Digital download	Sony
Worldwide	15 February 2015	CD / Digital download	Sony
Worldwide	20 February 2015	CD / Digital download	Sony
Worldwide	11 December 2015	CD / Digital download	Sony
Worldwide	26 October 2001	Música MP3	Sony
Worldwide	28 March 2019	Disco de vinilo	Sony
Worldwide	21 April 2021	Disco de vinilo	Sony
Worldwide	21 May 2021	Disco de vinilo, Edición coleccionista	Sony
