= Minage =

Studio album by Mónica Naranjo
- Released: 4 July 2000
- Recorded: 1999
- Genres: Latin pop; soft rock
- Length: 59:16
- Labels: Epic; Sony
- Producers: Phil Manzanera; Mónica Naranjo; Massimiliano Pani; Brian Rawling; Graham Stack; Cristóbal Sansano

Mónica Naranjo chronology
Palabra de Mujer (1997)	Minage (2000)	Chicas Malas (2001)

Singles from Minage
- 1. "Sobreviviré" Released: 13 March 2000; 2. "If You Leave Me Now" Released: 26 June 2000; 3. "Enamorada" Released: 27 November 2000

Professional ratings
Review scores
Source	Rating
AllMusic	3/5 stars

Minage is a tribute album by Spanish singer Mónica Naranjo, released in 2000 by Epic Records. It was produced by Cristóbal Sansano, a longtime collaborator of Naranjo. Recording took place between 1999 and 2000 in studios across Spain and Italy. The project was conceived as a personal and artistic tribute to Naranjo’s favorite singer, the Italian icon Mina, and consists entirely of Spanish-language covers of Mina’s songs.

The album was created following a serious airplane accident that forced Naranjo to take a break from her career and delayed the release of a more commercial follow-up album, which the label had envisioned as a sequel to Palabra de Mujer. At the time, Naranjo was widely regarded as one of the most prominent and influential female pop artists in Spain, often compared to Madonna in terms of her vocal power, public image, and impact on the Spanish music scene.

Minage experienced several delays prior to its release. The album was initially scheduled for release in September 1999 and was later postponed to the Christmas season of that year. These delays were largely due to a shift in the project’s original concept, which was first conceived as a pop-oriented studio album and was subsequently reworked into a covers album, resulting in changes to its musical direction and production timeline.

The release of Minage involved an open conflict with Sony Music, as the label preferred a commercial continuation of her previous multi-million-selling albums. Naranjo insisted on releasing the tribute album, taking a significant risk to avoid being typecast and to follow her own artistic vision. To partially satisfy the label, she rescued two songs from earlier commercial sessions to add pop elements and attempt to convince the company to release the album. In addition, she adopted a new image, changing her iconic multicolored hair to black, reflecting the darker and more mature themes of the project.

Minage received critical acclaim for its ambition, conceptual coherence, and the reinterpretation of Mina’s repertoire. Musically, the album marked a departure from Naranjo’s previous electronic and dance-pop style, embracing symphonic pop and melodic Italian influences, with complex arrangements and powerful vocal performances that emphasized her range and emotional intensity.

The album was promoted in Italy, Mina’s home country, but failed to achieve commercial success there. It also failed in Mexico, where media attention focused on Naranjo’s provocative outfits, strong vocal style, and outspoken support for the LGBT community, sparking controversy and polarizing audiences. She never fully recovered from the backlash in Mexico.

Minage sold nearly half a million copies in Spain and other Spanish-speaking countries, 100,000 of them coming from the orders. The hit single Sobreviviré established Naranjo as an LGBT icon in Spain, remains her greatest hit, and gained renewed popularity during the pandemic. The album is now considered one of Naranjo’s most personal and important works and has achieved the status of a cult album, highlighting her resilience, her desire not to be typecast, and her commitment to her artistry despite personal, professional, and social challenges. Five of the songs were released as singles.

== Track listing ==
No.	Title	Writer(s)	Original version	Length
1.	"Ahora, Ahora"	G.P. Felisatti & C. Malgioglio	"Ancora, ancora, ancora"	4:36
2.	"Sobreviviré"	E. Riccardi & L. Albertelli	"Fiume azzurro"	4:57
3.	"Perra Enamorada"	Mogol & Battisti	"Io e te da soli"	5:00
4.	"Enamorada" (Spanglish Version)	R. Darbyshire, M Saggese, W. Turbitt & F. Musker		4:21
5.	"Qué Imposible"	C. Malgioglio & A. Anelli	"L'importante è finire"	4:04
6.	"Amando Locamente"	P. Casella, L. Cantini & L. Lopez	"Ancora dolcemente"	4:34
7.	"If You Leave Me Now"	Mónica Naranjo, Graham Stack, John Reid & Cristóbal Sansano		3:34
8.	"Inmensidad"	Mogol, Capone & Detto	"L'immensità"	2:59
9.	"Abismo"	F. Leali & Mamared	"L'ultima volta"	5:35
10.	"Él Se Encuentra Entre Tú y Yo" (featuring Mina)	Mónica Naranjo, F. Berlincioni, M. Culotta & Cristóbal Sansano		4:43
11.	"Siempre Fuiste Mío"	Dario Baldan Bembo, Mina Anna Mazzini, Cristóbal Sansano & Paolo Limiti	"Eccomi"	4:15
12.	"Mi Vida Por un Hombre"	Mogol & Battisti	"Io vivrò senza te"	6:31
13.	"Sobreviviré" (The Groove Brothers Club Mix - Brian Rawling Remix)	E. Riccardi & L. Albertelli		4:05

Special edition bonus tracks
No.	Title	Writer(s)	Length
14.	"Seguiré sin ti" (If You Leave Me Now - Spanish Version)	Mónica Naranjo, Graham Stack, John Reid & Cristóbal Sansano	3:34
15.	"Enamorada" (Spanish Version)	R. Darbyshire, M Saggese, W. Turbitt & F. Musker	4:21
Total length:			67:23

== Charts ==
=== Weekly charts ===
Initial weekly chart performance for Minage
Chart (2000)	Peak position
European Albums (Music & Media)	47
Spanish Albums (PROMUSICAE)	1

2020 weekly chart performance for Minage
Chart (2020)	Peak position
Spanish Albums (Promusicae)	22

Weekly chart performance for Puro Minage
Chart (2021)	Peak position
Spanish Albums (Promusicae)	24

=== Year-end charts ===
Year-end chart performance for Minage
Chart (2000)	Position
Spanish Albums (PROMUSICAE)	22

== Certifications and sales ==
Certifications for Minage
Region	Certification	Certified units/sales
Mexico (AMPROFON)	Gold	75,000^{^}
Spain (Promusicae)	3× Platinum	300,000^{^}
Summaries
Worldwide	—	1,000,000
^{^} Shipments figures based on certification alone.

Country / Platform	Date	Format	Label
Worldwide	16 March 2000	Audio-CD	
Worldwide	20 March 2000	Audio-CD	
Worldwide	26 April 2000	Audio-CD	
Worldwide	23 May 2000	Audio-CD, Import	
Worldwide	20 June 2000	Audio-CD	
Worldwide	4 July 2000	CD de audio	
Worldwide	20 July 2000	Audio-CD, Importación	
Worldwide	7 May 2001	Audio-CD, Import	
Worldwide	25 June 2009	CD	
Worldwide	1 January 2013	Audio CD, Double CD, Compilation	
Worldwide	4 March 2017	Vinyl	
Worldwide	11 May 2018	Disco de vinilo, Edición limitada	
Worldwide	24 May 2019	Vinyl	
Worldwide	14 February 2020	Vinyl	
Worldwide	4 December 2020	Audio CD, Cofre, Digital	
Worldwide	21 May 2021	CD de audio, Grabación original remasterizada	
