= Mónica Naranjo (album) =

Studio album by Mónica Naranjo
- Released: June 14, 1994
- Recorded: 1993
- Genres: Latin Pop; Dance; Disco
- Length: 44:20
- Labels: Epic; Sony
- Producers: Cristóbal Sansano, Monica Naranjo

Mónica Naranjo chronology
Mónica Naranjo (1994)	Palabra de Mujer (1997)

Singles from Mónica Naranjo
- 1. "Sola"; 2. "Solo se vive una vez" 3. "El amor coloca" 4. "Fuego de Pasión"; 5. "Óyeme"; 6. "Dame Tu Calor"; 7. "Supernatural"; 8. "Llorando bajo la lluvia"

Mónica Naranjo is the self-titled debut album by Spanish singer-songwriter Mónica Naranjo. Co-written with Cristóbal Sansano, who she would later marry and then divorce, it's a combination of soft rock ballads and flamenco-disco numbers, and includes the hit Mexican singles, "Sóla", "Sólo Se Vive Una Vez", "El Amor Coloca", "Óyeme". The album sold 1 million copies in Mexico, having almost no sales in Spain.

== Track listing ==
No.	Title	Lyrics	Music	Length
1.	"El Amor Coloca"	José Manuel Navarro	Cristóbal Sansano	4:01
2.	"Sola"	Cristóbal Sansano	Mónica Naranjo; Cristóbal Sansano	4:08
3.	"Óyeme!"	Cristóbal Sansano	Cristóbal Sansano	4:58
4.	"Supernatural"	Mónica Naranjo; José Manuel Navarro	Cristóbal Sansano	3:58
5.	"Dame Tu Calor"	Mónica Naranjo	Cristóbal Sansano	4:50
6.	"Fuego de Pasión"	Mónica Naranjo	Stock; Aitken; Waterman	3:49
7.	"Llorando Bajo la Lluvia"	Cheni Navarro	Cheni Navarro	3:46
8.	"Sólo Se Vive Una Vez"	José Manuel Navarro	Mónica Naranjo; Cristóbal Sansano	4:11
9.	"Hoy la Luna Sale Para Mí"	Cheni Navarro	Cristóbal Sansano	3:11
10.	"Amor es Sólo Amar"	Cristóbal Sansano	Mónica Naranjo; Cristóbal Sansano	7:07

Mexican Edition Bonus Track
No.	Title	Lyrics	Music	Length
11.	"Megamix" (Sola, El Amor Coloca, Sólo Se Vive Una Vez)	Cristóbal Sansano, José Manuel Navarro	Mónica Naranjo; Cristóbal Sansano	7:14

== Sales and certifications ==
Region	Certification	Certified units/sales
Mexico (AMPROFON)	Diamond	1,000,000
Spain	—	1,500
United States (RIAA)	Platinum (Latin)	100,000^{^}
Summaries
Worldwide	—	1,500,000
^{^} Shipments figures based on certification alone.
