= Palabra de Mujer (album) =

Palabra de mujer

Studio album by Mónica Naranjo
- Released: 27 May 1997
- Recorded: 1996–97
- Genres: Latin pop; dance; techno; house
- Length: 45:28
- Labels: Epic; Sony
- Producers: Cristóbal Sansano; Mónica Naranjo

Mónica Naranjo chronology
Mónica Naranjo (1994)	Palabra de mujer (1997)	Minage (2000)

Singles from Palabra de Mujer
- 1. "Entender al Amor"; 2. "Desátame"; 3. "Empiezo a Recordarte"; 4. "Pantera en Libertad"; 5. "Amáme o Déjame"; 6. "Las Campanas del Amor"; 7. "Tú y Yo Volvemos al Amor"; 8. "Rezando en Soledad"

Palabra de mujer is the second studio album by Spanish singer-songwriter Mónica Naranjo. It was released on May 27, 1997, by Epic and Sony Music. It was certified Platinum in the Latin field by the RIAA for shipments of 100,000 copies and 10× Platinum (1,000,000 copies shipped) in her native Spain. It's her best selling album with over 2 million copies sold.

== Track listing ==
No.	Title	Lyrics	Music	Length
1.	"Desátame"	José M. Navarro	Mónica Naranjo, Cristóbal Sansano	4:49
2.	"Empiezo a recordarte"	Mónica Naranjo, Cristóbal Sansano	Mónica Naranjo	4:10
3.	"Yo vengo y tú te vas"	Mónica Naranjo, Cristóbal Sansano	Cristóbal Sansano	4:11
4.	"Entender el amor"	José M. Navarro	Mónica Naranjo, Cristóbal Sansano	5:26
5.	"Ámame o déjame"	Mónica Naranjo, Cristóbal Sansano	Cristóbal Sansano	4:59
6.	"Pantera en libertad"	José M. Navarro	Mónica Naranjo, Cristóbal Sansano	4:43
7.	"Rezando en soledad"	José M. Navarro	Mónica Naranjo, Cristóbal Sansano	4:51
8.	"Las campanas del amor"	José M. Navarro	Mónica Naranjo, Cristóbal Sansano	4:08
9.	"Miedo"	Mónica Naranjo, Cristóbal Sansano	Mónica Naranjo, Cristóbal Sansano	3:40
10.	"Tú y Yo Volvemos al Amor"	Mónica Naranjo, Cristóbal Sansano	Cristóbal Sansano	4:32

== Sales and certifications ==
Region	Certification	Certified units/sales
Mexico (AMPROFON)	Gold	700,000
Spain (Promusicae)	10× Platinum	1,300,000
United States (RIAA)	Platinum (Latin)	100,000^{^}
Summaries
Worldwide	—	2,000,000
^{^} Shipments figures based on certification alone.

== See also ==
- List of best-selling albums in Spain
- List of best-selling Latin albums
